= United States House Agriculture Subcommittee on Commodity Markets, Digital Assets, and Rural Development =

Subcommittee of the House Agriculture Committee

Subcommittee of Committee on Agriculture
- Active United States House of Representatives; 119th Congress

Leadership
- Chair: Dusty Johnson (R)
- Ranking Member: Donald G. Davis (D)

Structure
- Seats: 23 (22 currently filled) 12/12 10/11
- Political parties: Majority (12): Republican (12); Minority (10): Democratic (10)

Meeting place
- 1301, Longworth House Office Building; Washington, D.C. 20515

Phone number
- (202)-225-2171

The United States House Subcommittee on Commodity Markets, Digital Assets, and Rural Development is a subcommittee within the House Agriculture Committee. It was previously known as the subcommittee on Commodity Exchanges, Energy, and Credit, but lost jurisdiction over agricultural credit at the 118th Congress.

It is currently chaired by Republican Dusty Johnson of South Dakota. Its Ranking Member is Democrat Don Davis of North Carolina.

== Jurisdiction ==
Policies, statutes, and markets relating to commodity exchanges; rural development; energy; rural electrification; and related oversight of such issues.

== History ==
The subcommittee was formerly known as the Subcommittee on Conservation, Credit, Rural Development and Research prior to the 110th Congress when rural development issues and several other of its responsibilities, such as farm security and family farming matters, plant pests and pesticides, and biotechnology were transferred to other subcommittees. Energy was also added to the subcommittee's title to reflect the committee's continued oversight over the federal Rural Electrification program and the increases development and use of biofuels in the United States.

At the start of the 112th Congress, the subcommittee gained jurisdiction over forestry issues from the Department Operations, Oversight, Nutrition and Forestry and was renamed Subcommittee on Conservation, Energy, and Forestry.

At the start of the 114th Congress, the subcommittee was again renamed and its jurisdictional purview changed.

== Members, 119th Congress ==
Majority	Minority
Dusty Johnson, South Dakota, Chair; John Rose, Tennessee, Vice Chair; Frank Lucas, Oklahoma; Austin Scott, Georgia; David Rouzer, North Carolina; Tracey Mann, Kansas; Kat Cammack, Florida; Brad Finstad, Minnesota; Zach Nunn, Iowa; Rob Bresnahan, Pennsylvania; Mark Messmer, Indiana; Dave Taylor, Ohio	Don Davis, North Carolina, Ranking Member; Eugene Vindman, Virginia, Vice Ranking Member; David Scott, Georgia (until April 22, 2026); Nikki Budzinski, Illinois; Jonathan Jackson, Illinois; Shri Thanedar, Michigan; Adam Gray, California; Kristen McDonald Rivet, Michigan; Shomari Figures, Alabama; John Mannion, New York; April McClain Delaney, Maryland
Ex officio
Glenn Thompson, Pennsylvania	Angie Craig, Minnesota

== Historical membership rosters ==
=== 118th Congress ===
Majority	Minority
Dusty Johnson, South Dakota, Chair; Frank Lucas, Oklahoma; Austin Scott, Georgia; David Rouzer, North Carolina; Don Bacon, Nebraska; Tracey Mann, Kansas; John Rose, Tennessee; Marc Molinaro, New York; Nick Langworthy, New York; Zach Nunn, Iowa; Lori Chavez-DeRemer, Oregon; Max Miller, Ohio	Yadira Caraveo, Colorado, Ranking Member; Don Davis, North Carolina; Jim Costa, California; Andrea Salinas, Oregon; Marie Gluesenkamp Perez, Washington; Nikki Budzinski, Illinois; Greg Casar, Texas; Jonathan Jackson, Illinois; Angie Craig, Minnesota; Jasmine Crockett, Texas
Ex officio
Glenn Thompson, Pennsylvania	David Scott, Georgia

=== 117th Congress ===
Majority	Minority
Antonio Delgado, New York, Chair; Sean Patrick Maloney, New York; Stacey Plaskett, U.S. Virgin Islands; Ro Khanna, California; Cindy Axne, Iowa; Bobby Rush, Illinois; Angie Craig, Minnesota; Ann McLane Kuster, New Hampshire; Cheri Bustos, Illinois	Michelle Fischbach, Minnesota, Ranking Member; Austin Scott, Georgia; Doug LaMalfa, California; Rodney Davis, Illinois; Chris Jacobs, New York; Troy Balderson, Ohio; Michael Cloud, Texas; Randy Feenstra, Iowa; Kat Cammack, Florida
Ex officio
David Scott, Georgia	Glenn Thompson, Pennsylvania

=== 116th Congress ===
Majority	Minority
David Scott, Georgia, Chair; Filemon Vela Jr., Texas; Stacey Plaskett, U.S. Virgin Islands; Abigail Spanberger, Virginia; Antonio Delgado, New York; Angie Craig, Minnesota; Sean Patrick Maloney, New York; Ann Kirkpatrick, Arizona; Cindy Axne, Iowa	Austin Scott, Georgia, Ranking Member; Rick Crawford, Arkansas; Mike Bost, Illinois; David Rouzer, North Carolina; Roger Marshall, Kansas; Neal Dunn, Florida; Dusty Johnson, South Dakota; Jim Baird, Indiana
Ex officio
Collin Peterson, Minnesota	Mike Conaway, Texas

=== 115th Congress ===
Majority	Minority
Austin Scott, Georgia, Chairman; Bob Goodlatte, Virginia; Mike Rogers, Alabama; Doug LaMalfa, California; Rodney Davis, Illinois; James Comer, Kentucky; Roger Marshall, Kansas; John Faso, New York	David Scott, Georgia, Ranking Member; Sean Patrick Maloney, New York; Ann McLane Kuster, New Hampshire; Stacey Plaskett, U.S. Virgin Islands; Tom O'Halleran, Arizona; Darren Soto, Florida
Ex officio
Mike Conaway, Texas	Collin Peterson, Minnesota
