= United States House Agriculture Subcommittee on Livestock, Dairy, and Poultry =

Subcommittee of Committee on Agriculture
- Active United States House of Representatives; 119th Congress

Leadership
- Chair: Tracey Mann (R)
- Ranking Member: Jim Costa (D)

Structure
- Seats: 19 (19 currently filled) 14/14 5/5
- Political parties: Majority (14): Republican (14); Minority (5): Democratic (5)

Meeting place
- 1301, Longworth House Office Building; Washington, D.C. 20515

Phone number
- (202)-225-2171

The House Subcommittee on Livestock, Dairy, and Poultry is a subcommittee within the House Agriculture Committee.

The subcommittee was previously known as the Subcommittee on Livestock and Horticulture, but its duties were split at the start of the 110th Congress when the United States House Agriculture Subcommittee on Horticulture and Organic Agriculture was established. Between then and the 118th Congress it had jurisdiction over foreign agriculture and trade and was known as the Subcommittee on Livestock and Foreign Agriculture accordingly.

The Chair of the subcommittee is Republican Tracey Mann of Kansas. Its Ranking Member is Democrat Jim Costa of California.

== Jurisdiction ==
Policies, statutes, and markets relating to all livestock, poultry, dairy, and seafood, including all products thereof; the inspection, marketing, and promotion of such commodities and products; aquaculture; animal welfare; grazing; and related oversight of such issues.

== Members, 119th Congress ==
Majority	Minority
Tracey Mann, Kansas, Chair; Derrick Van Orden, Wisconsin, Vice Chair; Scott DesJarlais, Tennessee; Trent Kelly, Mississippi; Don Bacon, Nebraska; Jim Baird, Indiana; Randy Feenstra, Iowa; Mary Miller, Illinois; Barry Moore, Alabama; Brad Finstad, Minnesota; Ronny Jackson, Texas; Tony Wied, Wisconsin; Mark Messmer, Indiana; Mark Harris, North Carolina	Jim Costa, California, Ranking Member; Adam Gray, California, Vice Ranking Member; Jahana Hayes, Connecticut; Don Davis, North Carolina; Josh Riley, New York
Ex officio
Glenn Thompson, Pennsylvania	Angie Craig, Minnesota

== Historical membership rosters ==
=== 118th Congress ===
Majority	Minority
Tracey Mann, Kansas, Chair; Scott DesJarlais, Tennessee; Trent Kelly, Mississippi; Don Bacon, Nebraska; Jim Baird, Indiana; Randy Feenstra, Iowa; Barry Moore, Alabama; Ronny Jackson, Texas; Marc Molinaro, New York; Mark Alford, Missouri; Derrick Van Orden, Wisconsin	Jim Costa, California, Ranking Member; Abigail Spanberger, Virginia; Jahana Hayes, Connecticut; Yadira Caraveo, Colorado; Jill Tokuda, Hawaii; Gabe Vasquez, New Mexico; Chellie Pingree, Maine; Darren Soto, Florida
Ex officio
Glenn Thompson, Pennsylvania	David Scott, Georgia

=== 117th Congress ===
Majority	Minority
Jim Costa, California, Chair; Abigail Spanberger, Virginia; Jahana Hayes, Connecticut; Lou Correa, California; Josh Harder, California; Ro Khanna, California; Cindy Axne, Iowa; Bobby Rush, Illinois; Stacey Plaskett, U.S. Virgin Islands; Angie Craig, Minnesota; Sanford Bishop, Georgia	Dusty Johnson, South Dakota, Ranking Member; Scott DesJarlais, Tennessee; Vicky Hartzler, Missouri; David Rouzer, North Carolina; Trent Kelly, Mississippi; Don Bacon, Nebraska; Jim Baird, Indiana; Jim Hagedorn, Minnesota; Tracey Mann, Kansas; Randy Feenstra, Iowa; Barry Moore, Alabama
Ex officio
David Scott, Georgia	Glenn Thompson, Pennsylvania

=== 116th Congress ===
Majority	Minority
Jim Costa, California, Chair; Anthony Brindisi, New York; Jahana Hayes, Connecticut; TJ Cox, California; Angie Craig, Minnesota; Josh Harder, California; Filemon Vela Jr., Texas; Stacey Plaskett, U.S. Virgin Islands; Salud Carbajal, California; Cheri Bustos, Illinois; Jimmy Panetta, California	David Rouzer, North Carolina, Ranking Member; Glenn Thompson, Pennsylvania; Scott DesJarlais, Tennessee; Vicky Hartzler, Missouri; Trent Kelly, Mississippi; James Comer, Kentucky; Roger Marshall, Kansas; Don Bacon, Nebraska; Jim Hagedorn, Minnesota
Ex officio
Collin Peterson, Minnesota	Mike Conaway, Texas

=== 115th Congress ===
Majority	Minority
David Rouzer, North Carolina, Chairman; Bob Goodlatte, Virginia; Steve King, Iowa; Scott DesJarlais, Tennessee; Vicky Hartzler, Missouri; Ted Yoho, Florida; Trent Kelly, Mississippi; Roger Marshall, Kansas	Jim Costa, California, Ranking Member; Filemon Vela Jr., Texas; Cheri Bustos, Illinois; Stacey Plaskett, U.S. Virgin Islands; Dwight Evans, Pennsylvania
Ex officio
Mike Conaway, Texas	Collin Peterson, Minnesota
