= DIGNIDAD Act =

American immigration bill

DIGNIDAD (Dignity) Act of 2025
- Long title: "Dignity for Immigrants while Guarding our Nation to Ignite and Deliver the American Dream Act of 2025" or as the "DIGNIDAD" (Dignity) Act of 2025
- Nicknames: Dignity Act, American Prosperity and Competitiveness Act, Dream Act, Legal Workforce Act
- Announced in: the 119th United States Congress
- Number of co-sponsors: 40

Legislative history
- Introduced in the House of Representatives as H.R. 4393 by Maria Elvira Salazar (R–FL) on July 7, 2025; Committee consideration by House Judiciary, Homeland Security, Ways and Means, Transportation and Infrastructure, Education and the Workforce, Oversight and Government Reform, and Armed Services

The "Dignity for Immigrants while Guarding our Nation to Ignite and Deliver the American Dream Act", informally known as the DIGNIDAD ACT or the Dignity Act, is a bill introduced in the United States House of Representatives during the 118th and 119th Congresses. The bill aims to reform the immigration system of the United States.

Originally introduced on 23 May 2023, as House Resolution No. 3599 by Republican Congresswoman María Elvira Salazar, the legislation was reintroduced in 2025, as H.R. 4393 in the 119th Congress. The legislation is structured into several divisions, each targeting a specific pillar of the immigration system.

== History ==
The Act originates from Salazar's "Dignity Plan" announced by Salazar in March 2021, which proposed changes to the immigration system. After consultation with business leaders and agricultural farm owners, the first version of the Act was introduced in early 2022, followed by the more comprehensive H.R. 3599 in May 2023.

Following the conclusion of the 118th Congress without a floor vote, the bill was reintroduced in July 2025 as H.R. 4393. The 2025 version features several strategic modifications designed to appeal to a Republican-led House, most notably the elimination of the "Redemption Program" which offered a direct path to citizenship and its replacement with "Dignity Status", a renewable non-immigrant legal standing, conceptually similar to a legal permanent residency status (Green Card). The reintroduction was led by Representatives Salazar and Veronica Escobar. On 13 August 2026, Salazar presented a copy of the bill to Pope Leo XIV in Rome.

== Fiscal impact ==
Economic analysis from the Bipartisan Policy Center suggests that the DIGNIDAD Act would have a positive impact on the American economy. The reduction of the Green Card backlog alone is projected to increase the U.S. GDP by $3.9 trillion over 10 years. Salazar has stated that the Act would reduce the national debt by $50 billion.

== Congressional support ==
=== Congressional cosponsors ===
The Act was introduced by Representative Maria Elvira Salazar (R-FL). As of April 2026, the bill has 40 cosponsors with a split of 20 Republicans and 20 Democrats.

Republican Party

- Don Bacon (NE-02)
- Jim Baird (IN-04)
- Mario Díaz-Balart (FL-26)
- Monica De La Cruz (TX-15)
- Neal Dunn (FL-02)
- Gabe Evans (CO-08)
- Brian Fitzpatrick (PA-01)
- Mike Kelly (PA-16)
- Jennifer Kiggans (VA-02)
- Young Kim (CA-40)
- Nick LaLota (NY-01)
- Mike Lawler (NY-17)
- James Moylan (GU)
- Dan Newhouse (WA-04)
- Zach Nunn (IA-03)
- Maria Elvira Salazar (FL-27) (Sponsor)
- Lloyd Smucker (PA-11)
- Marlin Stutzman (IN-03)
- David Valadao (CA-22)
- Kimberlyn King-Hinds (Mariana Islands)

Democratic Party

- Yassamin Ansari (AZ-03)
- Jake Auchincloss (MA-04)
- Nikki Budzinski (IL-13)
- Salud Carbajal (CA-24)
- Jim Costa (CA-21)
- Henry Cuellar (TX-28)
- Veronica Escobar (TX-16)
- Adriano Espaillat (NY-13)
- Laura Gillen (NY-04)
- Adam Gray (CA-13)
- Chrissy Houlahan (PA-06)
- Susie Lee (NV-03)
- Mike Levin (CA-49)
- Betty McCollum (MN-04)
- Pat Ryan (NY-18)
- Hillary Scholten (MI-03)
- Thomas Suozzi (NY-03)
- Emilia Sykes (OH-13)
- Dina Titus (NV-01)
- Lori Trahan (MA-03)

=== Organizations ===
The legislation is supported by a coalition of organizations representing largely business and religious interests.

==== Business and trade groups ====
- American Bakers Association
- Associated General Contractors of America
- National Association of Home Builders
- National Retail Federation
- United States Chamber of Commerce
- United States Hispanic Business Council
- Greater Houston Partnership
- Texas Business Leadership Council

==== Religious organizations ====
- National Association of Evangelicals
- World Relief
- Anti-Defamation League
- Asian American Christian Collaborative
- Council for Christian Colleges & Universities
- National Hispanic Christian Leadership Conference

==== Advocacy and policy institutes ====
- American Business Immigration Council (ABIC)
- Americans for Prosperity
- Center for American Progress
- FWD.us
- National Immigration Forum
- Niskanen Center
- Third Way
- The LIBRE Initiative
- Presidents' Alliance on Higher Education and Immigration
