= United States House Agriculture Subcommittee on Forestry and Horticulture =

Subcommittee of Committee on Agriculture
- Active United States House of Representatives; 119th Congress

Leadership
- Chair: Dan Newhouse (R)
- Ranking Member: Andrea Salinas (D)

Structure
- Seats: 13 (13 currently filled) 7/7 6/6
- Political parties: Majority (7): Republican (7); Minority (6): Democratic (6)

Meeting place
- 1301, Longworth House Office Building; Washington, D.C. 20515

Phone number
- (202)-225-2171

The U.S. House Agriculture Subcommittee on Forestry and Horticulture is a subcommittee within the House Agriculture Committee. From 2015 to 2023, it had jurisdiction over resource conservation and was known as the Subcommittee on Conservation and Forestry. From 2023-2025 it was simply the Subcommittee on Forestry.

It was chaired by Republican Doug LaMalfa of California. Its Ranking Member was Democrat Andrea Salinas of Oregon.

== Jurisdiction ==
Policies and statutes relating to forestry and all forests under the jurisdiction of the Committee on Agriculture; regulatory issues impacting national forests; and related oversight of such issues. Policies and statutes and markets relating to horticulture, including fruits, vegetables, nuts, and ornamentals; bees; and organic agriculture; policies and statutes relating to marketing and promotion orders.

== Members, 119th Congress ==
| Majority | Minority |
|---|---|
| Doug LaMalfa, California, Chair; Barry Moore, Alabama, Vice Chair; David Rouzer, North Carolina; Trent Kelly, Mississippi; Jim Baird, Indiana; Dan Newhouse, Washington; Tony Wied, Wisconsin | Andrea Salinas, Oregon, Ranking Member; Josh Riley, New York, Vice Ranking Member; Jim Costa, California; Gabe Vasquez, New Mexico; Adam Gray, California |
Ex officio
| Glenn Thompson, Pennsylvania | Angie Craig, Minnesota |

== Historical membership rosters ==
=== 118th Congress ===
| Majority | Minority |
|---|---|
| Doug LaMalfa, California, Chair; John Duarte, California; Barry Moore, Alabama; Lori Chavez-DeRemer, Oregon | Andrea Salinas, Oregon, Ranking Member; Marie Gluesenkamp Perez, Washington; Gabe Vasquez, New Mexico; Chellie Pingree, Maine |
Ex officio
| Glenn Thompson, Pennsylvania | David Scott, Georgia |

=== 117th Congress ===
| Majority | Minority |
|---|---|
| Abigail Spanberger, Virginia, Chair; Filemon Vela Jr., Texas; Chellie Pingree, Maine; Ann McLane Kuster, New Hampshire; Tom O'Halleran, Arizona; Jimmy Panetta, California; Lou Correa, California; Kim Schrier, Washington | Doug LaMalfa, California, Ranking Member; Scott DesJarlais, Tennessee; Rick Allen, Georgia; Trent Kelly, Mississippi; Dusty Johnson, South Dakota; Mary Miller, Illinois; Barry Moore, Alabama |
Ex officio
| David Scott, Georgia | Glenn Thompson, Pennsylvania |

=== 116th Congress ===
| Majority | Minority |
|---|---|
| Abigail Spanberger, Virginia, Chair; Marcia Fudge, Ohio; Tom O'Halleran, Arizona; Chellie Pingree, Maine; Cindy Axne, Iowa | Doug LaMalfa, California, Ranking Member; Rick Allen, Georgia; Ralph Abraham, Louisiana; Trent Kelly, Mississippi |
Ex officio
| Collin Peterson, Minnesota | Mike Conaway, Texas |

=== 115th Congress ===
| Majority | Minority |
|---|---|
| Frank Lucas, Oklahoma, Chairman; Glenn Thompson, Pennsylvania; Jeff Denham, California; Doug LaMalfa, California; Rick Allen, Georgia; Mike Bost, Illinois; Ralph Abraham, Louisiana; Trent Kelly, Mississippi | Marcia Fudge, Ohio, Ranking Member; Tim Walz, Minnesota; Ann McLane Kuster, New Hampshire; Rick Nolan, Minnesota; Tom O'Halleran, Arizona; Filemon Vela Jr., Texas |
Ex officio
| Mike Conaway, Texas | Collin Peterson, Minnesota |
