= United States House Agriculture Subcommittee on General Farm Commodities, Risk Management, and Credit =

Subcommittee of the House Agriculture Committee

Subcommittee of Committee on Agriculture
- Active United States House of Representatives; 119th Congress

Leadership
- Chair: Austin Scott (R)
- Ranking Member: Sharice Davids (D)

Structure
- Seats: 21 (20 currently filled) 14/14 6/7
- Political parties: Majority (14): Republican (14); Minority (6): Democratic (6)

Meeting place
- 1301, Longworth House Office Building; Washington, D.C. 20515

Phone number
- (202)-225-2171

The House Subcommittee on General Farm Commodities, Risk Management, and Credit is a subcommittee within the House Agriculture Committee.

It is currently chaired by Republican Austin Scott of Georgia. Its Ranking Member is Democrat Sharice Davids of Kansas.

== Jurisdiction ==
Policies, statutes, and markets relating to commodities including barley, cotton, cottonseed, corn, grain sorghum, honey, mohair, oats, other oilseeds, peanuts, pulse crops, rice, soybeans, sugar, wheat, and wool; the Commodity Credit Corporation; risk management policies and statutes, including Federal Crop Insurance; producer data and privacy issues; agricultural credit; and related oversight of such issues.

Specialty crops, such as peanuts, sugar, and tobacco, which were previously handled by the Subcommittee on Specialty Crops, Rural Development and Foreign Agriculture were added to the subcommittee's jurisdiction during the 112th Congress.

== Members, 119th Congress ==
Majority	Minority
Austin Scott, Georgia, Chair; David Rouzer, North Carolina, Vice Chair; Rick Crawford, Arkansas; Doug LaMalfa, California; Mike Bost, Illinois; Dusty Johnson, South Dakota; Mary Miller, Illinois; Barry Moore, Alabama; Brad Finstad, Minnesota; John Rose, Tennessee; Monica De La Cruz, Texas; Zach Nunn, Iowa; Mark Harris, North Carolina	Sharice Davids, Kansas, Ranking Member; Nikki Budzinski, Illinois, Vice Ranking Member; David Scott, Georgia (until April 22, 2026); Shontel Brown, Ohio; Don Davis, North Carolina; Eric Sorensen, Illinois; Kristen McDonald Rivet, Michigan
Ex officio
Glenn Thompson, Pennsylvania	Angie Craig, Minnesota

== Historical membership rosters ==
=== 118th Congress ===
Majority	Minority
Austin Scott, Georgia, Chair; Rick Crawford, Arkansas; Doug LaMalfa, California; David Rouzer, North Carolina; Dusty Johnson, South Dakota; Mary Miller, Illinois; Barry Moore, Alabama; Brad Finstad, Minnesota; John Rose, Tennessee; Ronny Jackson, Texas; Monica De La Cruz, Texas; John Duarte, California; Zach Nunn, Iowa; Mark Alford, Missouri	Shontel Brown, Ohio, Ranking Member; Sharice Davids, Kansas; Don Davis, North Carolina; Eric Sorensen, Illinois; Angie Craig, Minnesota; Jasmine Crockett, Texas; Nikki Budzinski, Illinois; Alma Adams, North Carolina; Salud Carbajal, California
Ex officio
Glenn Thompson, Pennsylvania	David Scott, Georgia

=== 117th Congress ===
Majority	Minority
Cheri Bustos, Illinois, Chair; Angie Craig, Minnesota; Filemon Vela Jr., Texas; Salud Carbajal, California; Tom O'Halleran, Arizona; Al Lawson, Florida; Sanford Bishop, Georgia	Austin Scott, Georgia, Ranking Member; Rick Crawford, Arkansas; David Rouzer, North Carolina; Tracey Mann, Kansas; Mary Miller, Illinois
Ex officio
David Scott, Georgia	Glenn Thompson, Pennsylvania

=== 116th Congress ===
Majority	Minority
Filemon Vela Jr., Texas, Chair; Angie Craig, Minnesota; David Scott, Georgia; Al Lawson, Florida; Salud Carbajal, California	Glenn Thompson, Pennsylvania, Ranking Member; Austin Scott, Georgia; Rick Crawford, Arkansas; Rick Allen, Georgia; Ralph Abraham, Louisiana
Ex officio
Collin Peterson, Minnesota	Mike Conaway, Texas

=== 115th Congress ===
Majority	Minority
Rick Crawford, Arkansas, Chairman; Frank Lucas, Oklahoma; Mike Rogers, Alabama; Bob Gibbs, Ohio; Austin Scott, Georgia; Scott Desjarlais, Tennessee; Mike Bost, Illinois; Ralpha Abraham, Louisiana; Don Bacon, Nebraska; Neal Dunn, Florida; Jodey Arrington, Texas	Rick Nolan, Minnesota, Ranking Member; Tim Walz, Minnesota; Cheri Bustos, Illinois; Lisa Blunt Rochester, Delaware; David Scott, Georgia; Sean Patrick Maloney, New York; Stacey Plaskett, U.S. Virgin Islands; Al Lawson, Florida; Tom O'Halleran, Arizona
Ex officio
Mike Conaway, Texas	Collin Peterson, Minnesota
