= United States House Agriculture Subcommittee on Nutrition and Foreign Agriculture =

Subcommittee of the House Agriculture Committee

Subcommittee of Committee on Agriculture
- Active United States House of Representatives; 119th Congress

Leadership
- Chair: Brad Finstad (R)
- Ranking Member: Jahana Hayes (D)

Structure
- Seats: 19 (19 currently filled) 11/11 8/8
- Political parties: Majority (11): Republican (11); Minority (8): Democratic (8)

Meeting place
- 1301, Longworth House Office Building; Washington, D.C. 20515

Phone number
- (202)-225-2171

The House Subcommittee on Nutrition and Foreign Agriculture is a subcommittee within the House Agriculture Committee. Previously known as the Subcommittee on Nutrition, its duties were greatly expanded in the 118th Congress to cover foreign agriculture, international trade, horticulture and plant-based agriculture.

It is currently chaired by Republican Brad Finstad of Minnesota. Its Ranking Member is Democrat Jahana Hayes of Connecticut.

== Jurisdiction ==
Policies and statutes relating to nutrition, including the Supplemental Nutrition Assistance Program and domestic commodity distribution and consumer initiative; policies and statutes related to foreign agricultural assistance and trade promotion; and related oversight of such issues.

== Members, 119th Congress ==
| Majority | Minority |
|---|---|
| Brad Finstad, Minnesota, Chair; Monica De La Cruz, Texas, Vice Chair; Frank Lucas, Oklahoma; Austin Scott, Georgia; Scott DesJarlais, Tennessee; Jim Baird, Indiana; Tracey Mann, Kansas; Mary Miller, Illinois; Derrick Van Orden, Wisconsin; Tony Wied, Wisconsin; Mark Harris, North Carolina | Jahana Hayes, Connecticut, Ranking Member; Shomari Figures, Alabama, Vice Ranking Member; Jim McGovern, Massachusetts; Alma Adams, North Carolina; Shontel Brown, Ohio; Andrea Salinas, Oregon; Jill Tokuda, Hawaii; Jonathan Jackson, Illinois |
Ex officio
| Glenn Thompson, Pennsylvania | Angie Craig, Minnesota |

== Historical membership rosters ==
=== 118th Congress ===
| Majority | Minority |
|---|---|
| Brad Finstad, Minnesota, Chair; Austin Scott, Georgia; Tracey Mann, Kansas; Scott DesJarlais, Tennessee; Jim Baird, Indiana; John Rose, Tennessee; Marc Molinaro, New York; Monica De La Cruz, Texas; Nick Langworthy, New York; Derrick Van Orden, Wisconsin; Max Miller, Ohio | Jahana Hayes, Connecticut, Ranking Member; Jim McGovern, Massachusetts; Alma Adams, North Carolina; Jill Tokuda, Hawaii; Jasmine Crockett, Texas; Jonathan Jackson, Illinois; Greg Casar, Texas; Shontel Brown, Ohio; Andrea Salinas, Oregon; Yadira Caraveo, Colorado |
Ex officio
| Glenn Thompson, Pennsylvania | David Scott, Georgia |

=== 117th Congress ===
| Majority | Minority |
|---|---|
| Jahana Hayes, Connecticut, Chair; Jim McGovern, Massachusetts; Alma Adams, North Carolina; Bobby Rush, Illinois; Gregorio Sablan, Northern Mariana Islands; Salud Carbajal, California; Al Lawson, Florida; Ann McLane Kuster, New Hampshire; Jimmy Panetta, California; Sean Patrick Maloney, New York | Don Bacon, Nebraska, Ranking Member; Rick Crawford, Arkansas; Scott DesJarlais, Tennessee; Vicky Hartzler, Missouri; Jim Baird, Indiana; Chris Jacobs, New York; Michael Cloud, Texas; Kat Cammack, Florida |
Ex officio
| David Scott, Georgia | Glenn Thompson, Pennsylvania |

=== 116th Congress ===
| Majority | Minority |
|---|---|
| Marcia Fudge, Ohio, Chair; Jim McGovern, Massachusetts; Alma Adams, North Carolina; Jahana Hayes, Connecticut; Kim Schrier, Washington; Al Lawson, Florida; Jimmy Panetta, California | Dusty Johnson, South Dakota, Ranking Member; Scott Desjarlais, Tennessee; Rodney Davis, Illinois; Ted Yoho, Florida; Don Bacon, Nebraska; Jim Hagedorn, Minnesota |
Ex officio
| Collin Peterson, Minnesota | Mike Conaway, Texas |

=== 115th Congress ===
| Majority | Minority |
|---|---|
| Glenn Thompson, Pennsylvania, Chairman; Steve King, Iowa; Rick Crawford, Arkansas; Scott Desjarlais, Tennessee; Vicky Hartzler, Missouri; Rodney Davis, Illinois; Ted Yoho, Florida; David Rouzer, North Carolina; James Comer, Kentucky; Roger Marshall, Kansas; John Faso, New York; Jodey Arrington, Texas | Jim McGovern, Massachusetts, Ranking Member; Alma Adams, North Carolina; Dwight Evans, Pennsylvania; Marcia Fudge, Ohio; Michelle Lujan Grisham, New Mexico; Al Lawson, Florida; Jimmy Panetta, California; Darren Soto, Florida; Sean Patrick Maloney, New York |
Ex officio
| Mike Conaway, Texas | Collin Peterson, Minnesota |
