= Nancy Michael =

American politician

Member of the Indiana House of Representatives from the 44th district
- In office January 2009 – November 2010
- Preceded by: Amos Thomas
- Succeeded by: Jim Baird

Personal details
- Born: Northern Putnam County, Indiana, U.S.
- Party: Democratic
- Spouse: Steve
- Education: Indiana University

Nancy A. Michael is a former Democratic member of the Indiana House of Representatives, representing the 44th District from 2009 to 2010. She was formerly the Mayor of Greencastle, serving for 12 years from January 1996 through December 2007.
