= Beau Baird =

American politician from Indiana

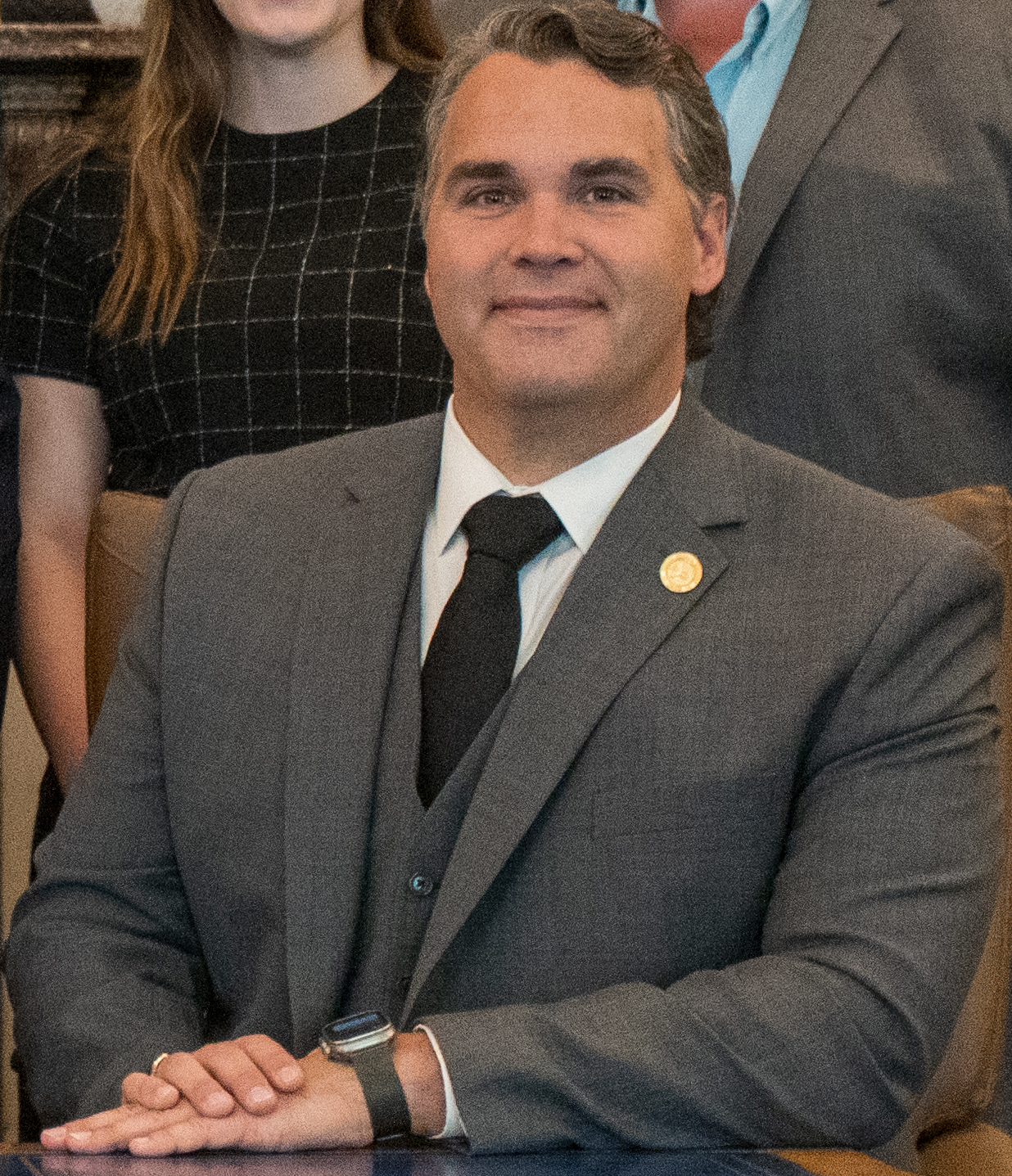
- Baird in 2023

Member of the Indiana House of Representatives from the 44th district
- Incumbent
- Assumed office November 7, 2018
- Preceded by: Jim Baird

Personal details
- Born: Jason Beau Baird; May 22, 1981 (age 45)
- Party: Republican
- Relatives: Jim Baird (father)
- Education: Purdue University (BS, MBA); Harvard University (MLA)

Jason Beau Baird (born May 22, 1981) is an American businessman and politician from the state of Indiana. He serves in the Indiana House of Representatives.

== Career ==
Baird has a Bachelor of Science in financial planning from Purdue University and a Master of Liberal Arts from Harvard University’s Harvard Extension School. Since May 2004, Baird has served as Chief Financial Officer of Indiana Home Care Plus.

A member of the Republican Party, he has served as Chair of the Putnam County Republican Party since March 2017, replacing Jerry Ensor.

On November 6, 2018, Baird was elected to the Indiana House of Representatives, succeeding his father, Jim Baird, who was elected to Congress.
