= United States House Committee on Agriculture =

Standing committee of the United States House of Representatives

House Agriculture Committee
Standing committee
- Active United States House of Representatives; 119th Congress

History
- Formed: May 3, 1820

Leadership
- Chair: Glenn Thompson (R); Since January 3, 2023
- Ranking Member: Angie Craig (D); Since January 3, 2025

Structure
- Seats: 54 (53 currently filled) 29/29 24/25
- Political parties: Majority (29): Republican (29); Minority (24): Democratic (24)

Jurisdiction
- Oversight authority: Department of Agriculture
- Senate counterpart: Senate Agriculture Committee

Subcommittees
- Nutrition and Foreign Agriculture; Conservation, Research, and Biotechnology; Forestry and Horticulture; General Farm Commodities, Risk Management, and Credit; Commodity Markets, Digital Assets, and Rural Development; Livestock, Dairy, and Poultry

Meeting place
- 1301, Longworth House Office Building; Washington, D.C. 20515
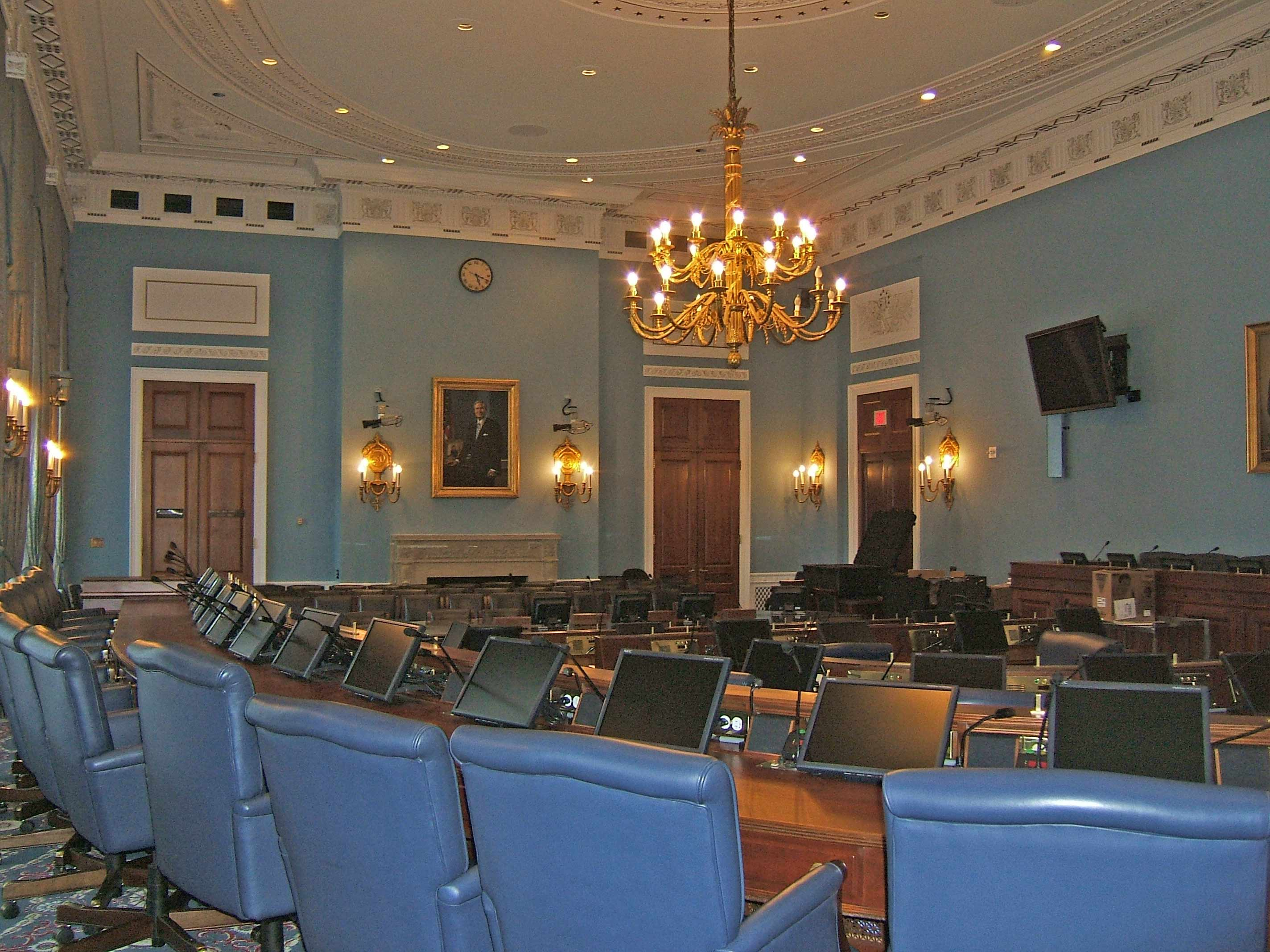

Website
- agriculture.house.gov (Republican) democrats-agriculture.house.gov (Democratic)

Phone number
- (202)-225-2171

The United States House of Representatives Committee on Agriculture, or Agriculture Committee is a standing committee of the United States House of Representatives. The House Committee on Agriculture has general jurisdiction over federal agriculture policy and oversight of some federal agencies, and it can recommend funding appropriations for various governmental agencies, programs, and activities, as defined by House rules.

== History of the committee ==
The Agriculture Committee was created on May 3, 1820, after Lewis Williams of North Carolina sponsored a resolution to create the committee and give agricultural issues equal weight with commercial and manufacturing interests. The committee originally consisted of seven members, from the states of Maryland, New Hampshire, New York, Pennsylvania, South Carolina, Vermont, and Virginia. Thomas Forrest of Pennsylvania was the first chair. The Agriculture Committee remained a seven-member body until 1835, when two more members were added. It was not until 1871 that the next two members were added. Since then it has gradually grown to its current size of 46 members.

The U.S. Senate counterpart to the House Agriculture Committee, the U.S. Senate Committee on Agriculture, Nutrition and Forestry, was created on December 9, 1825.

== Role of the committee ==
The Agriculture Committee is not generally considered to be a particularly powerful one. However, it is an important committee to be on for Representatives from many rural areas where agriculture is the main industry. The committee has jurisdiction over agriculture, forestry, nutrition, water conservation, and other agriculture-related fields.

=== Jurisdiction ===
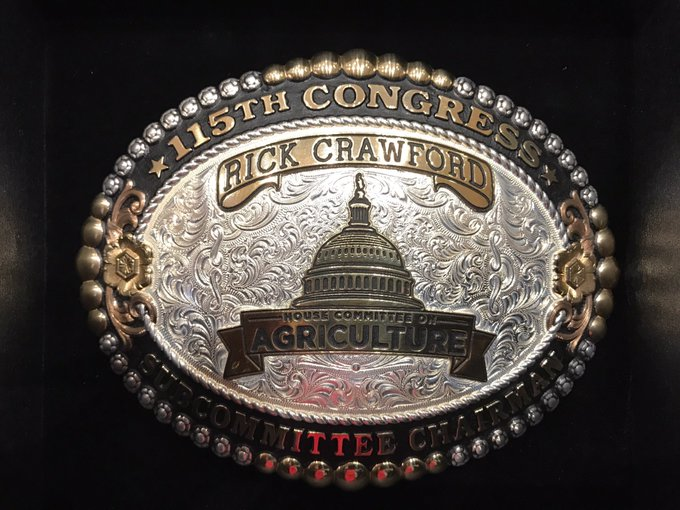
Members of the 115th Congress House Committee on Agriculture received belt buckles for their service.

As prescribed by House Rules, the Committee on Agriculture's jurisdiction includes the following:

- Adulteration of seeds, insect pests, and protection of birds and animals in forest reserves
- Agriculture generally
- Agricultural and industrial chemistry
- Agricultural colleges and experiment stations
- Agricultural economics and research
- Agricultural education extension services
- Agricultural production, marketing and stabilization of prices of agricultural products, and commodities (excluding foreign distribution)
- Animal industry and diseases of animals
- Commodity exchanges
- Crop insurance and soil conservation
- Dairy industry
- Entomology and plant quarantine
- Extension of farm credit and farm security
- Inspection of livestock, poultry, meat products, and seafood and seafood products
- Forestry in general and forest reserves other than those created from the public domain
- Human nutrition and home economics
- Plant industry, soils, and agricultural engineering
- Rural electrification
- Rural developments
- Water conservation related to activities of the Department of Agriculture

== Members, 119th Congress ==
Majority	Minority
Glenn Thompson, Pennsylvania, Chair; Frank Lucas, Oklahoma; Austin Scott, Georgia, Vice Chair; Rick Crawford, Arkansas; Scott DesJarlais, Tennessee; Doug LaMalfa, California (until January 6, 2026); David Rouzer, North Carolina; Trent Kelly, Mississippi; Don Bacon, Nebraska; Mike Bost, Illinois; Dusty Johnson, South Dakota; Jim Baird, Indiana; Tracey Mann, Kansas; Randy Feenstra, Iowa; Mary Miller, Illinois; Barry Moore, Alabama; Kat Cammack, Florida; Brad Finstad, Minnesota; John Rose, Tennessee; Ronny Jackson, Texas; Monica De La Cruz, Texas; Zach Nunn, Iowa; Derrick Van Orden, Wisconsin; Dan Newhouse, Washington; Tony Wied, Wisconsin; Rob Bresnahan, Pennsylvania; Mark Messmer, Indiana; Mark Harris, North Carolina; David Taylor, Ohio; David Valadao, California (from March 25, 2026)	Angie Craig, Minnesota, Ranking Member; David Scott, Georgia (until April 22, 2026); Jim Costa, California; Jim McGovern, Massachusetts; Alma Adams, North Carolina; Jahana Hayes, Connecticut; Shontel Brown, Ohio, Vice Ranking Member; Sharice Davids, Kansas; Andrea Salinas, Oregon; Don Davis, North Carolina; Jill Tokuda, Hawaii; Nikki Budzinski, Illinois; Eric Sorensen, Illinois; Gabe Vasquez, New Mexico; Jonathan Jackson, Illinois; Shri Thanedar, Michigan; Adam Gray, California; Kristen McDonald Rivet, Michigan; Shomari Figures, Alabama; Eugene Vindman, Virginia; Josh Riley, New York; John Mannion, New York; April McClain Delaney, Maryland; Chellie Pingree, Maine (from February 25, 2025); Salud Carbajal, California (from February 25, 2025)

Resolutions electing members: H.Res. 13 (Chair), H.Res. 14 (Ranking Member), H.Res. 42 (R), H.Res. 44 (D), H.Res. 162 (D), H.Res. 1135 (Valadao)

== Subcommittees ==
Subcommittee	Chair	Ranking member
General Farm Commodities, Risk Management, and Credit	Austin Scott (R-GA)	Sharice Davids (D-KS)
Forestry and Horticulture	Doug LaMalfa (R-CA)	Andrea Salinas (D-OR)
Conservation, Research, and Biotechnology	Frank Lucas (R-OK)	Jill Tokuda (D-HI)
Nutrition and Foreign Agriculture	Brad Finstad (R-MN)	Jahana Hayes (D-CT)
Livestock, Dairy, and Poultry	Tracey Mann (R-KS)	Jim Costa (D-CA)
Commodity Markets, Digital Assets, and Rural Development	Dusty Johnson (R-SD)	Don Davis (D-NC)

== Historical membership rosters ==
=== 115th Congress ===
Majority	Minority
Mike Conaway, Texas, Chair; Bob Goodlatte, Virginia; Frank Lucas, Oklahoma; Steve King, Iowa; Mike Rogers, Alabama; Glenn Thompson, Pennsylvania, Vice Chair; Bob Gibbs, Ohio; Austin Scott, Georgia; Rick Crawford, Arkansas; Scott DesJarlais, Tennessee; Vicky Hartzler, Missouri; Jeff Denham, California; Doug LaMalfa, California; Rodney Davis, Illinois; Ted Yoho, Florida; Rick Allen, Georgia; Mike Bost, Illinois; David Rouzer, North Carolina; Ralph Lee Abraham, Louisiana; Trent Kelly, Mississippi; James Comer, Kentucky; Roger Marshall, Kansas; Don Bacon, Nebraska; John Faso, New York; Neal Dunn, Florida; Jodey Arrington, Texas	Collin Peterson, Minnesota, Ranking Member; David Scott, Georgia; Jim Costa, California; Tim Walz, Minnesota; Marcia Fudge, Ohio; Jim McGovern, Massachusetts; Filemon Vela Jr., Texas, Vice Ranking Member; Michelle Lujan Grisham, New Mexico; Ann Kuster, New Hampshire; Rick Nolan, Minnesota; Cheri Bustos, Illinois; Sean Patrick Maloney, New York; Stacey Plaskett, U.S. Virgin Islands; Alma Adams, North Carolina; Dwight Evans, Pennsylvania; Al Lawson, Florida; Tom O'Halleran, Arizona; Jimmy Panetta, California; Darren Soto, Florida; Lisa Blunt Rochester, Delaware

=== 116th Congress ===
Majority	Minority
Collin Peterson, Minnesota, Chair; David Scott, Georgia; Jim Costa, California; Marcia Fudge, Ohio; Jim McGovern, Massachusetts; Filemon Vela Jr., Texas; Stacey Plaskett, U.S. Virgin Islands; Alma Adams, North Carolina, Vice Chair; Abigail Spanberger, Virginia; Jahana Hayes, Connecticut; Antonio Delgado, New York; TJ Cox, California; Angie Craig, Minnesota; Anthony Brindisi, New York; Josh Harder, California; Kim Schrier, Washington; Chellie Pingree, Maine; Cheri Bustos, Illinois; Sean Patrick Maloney, New York; Salud Carbajal, California; Al Lawson, Florida; Tom O'Halleran, Arizona; Jimmy Panetta, California; Ann Kirkpatrick, Arizona; Cindy Axne, Iowa; Xochitl Torres Small, New Mexico (since February 27, 2020)	Mike Conaway, Texas, Ranking Member; Glenn Thompson, Pennsylvania; Austin Scott, Georgia; Rick Crawford, Arkansas; Scott DesJarlais, Tennessee; Vicky Hartzler, Missouri; Doug LaMalfa, California; Rodney Davis, Illinois; Ted Yoho, Florida; Rick Allen, Georgia; Mike Bost, Illinois; David Rouzer, North Carolina; Ralph Abraham, Louisiana; Trent Kelly, Mississippi; James Comer, Kentucky; Roger Marshall, Kansas; Don Bacon, Nebraska; Neal Dunn, Florida; Dusty Johnson, South Dakota; Jim Baird, Indiana; Jim Hagedorn, Minnesota; Chris Jacobs, New York (since July 21, 2020); Troy Balderson, Ohio (since July 30, 2020)

Subcommittees

Subcommittee	Chair	Ranking Member
Commodity Exchanges, Energy, and Credit	David Scott (D-GA)	Austin Scott (R-GA)
Conservation and Forestry	Abigail Spanberger (D-VA)	Doug LaMalfa (R-CA)
Nutrition, Oversight, and Department Operations	Marcia Fudge (D-OH)	Dusty Johnson (R-SD)
General Farm Commodities and Risk Management	Filemon Vela Jr. (D-TX)	Glenn Thompson (R-PA)
Biotechnology, Horticulture, and Research	Stacey Plaskett (D-VI)	Neal Dunn (R-FL)
Livestock and Foreign Agriculture	Jim Costa (D-CA)	David Rouzer (R-NC)

=== 117th Congress ===
Majority	Minority
David Scott, Georgia, Chair; Jim Costa, California; Jim McGovern, Massachusetts; Filemon Vela Jr., Texas (until March 31, 2022); Alma Adams, North Carolina, Vice Chair; Abigail Spanberger, Virginia; Jahana Hayes, Connecticut; Antonio Delgado, New York (until May 25, 2022); Shontel Brown, Ohio (since November 4, 2021); Bobby Rush, Illinois; Chellie Pingree, Maine; Gregorio Sablan, Northern Mariana Islands (Note: Del. Sablan was an independent who caucused with the Democratic majority.); Ann McLane Kuster, New Hampshire; Cheri Bustos, Illinois; Sean Patrick Maloney, New York; Stacey Plaskett, U.S. Virgin Islands; Tom O'Halleran, Arizona; Salud Carbajal, California; Ro Khanna, California; Al Lawson, Florida; Lou Correa, California; Angie Craig, Minnesota; Josh Harder, California; Cindy Axne, Iowa; Kim Schrier, Washington; Jimmy Panetta, California; Ann Kirkpatrick, Arizona (until November 29, 2021); Sanford Bishop, Georgia; Marcy Kaptur, Ohio (since May 10, 2022); Sharice Davids, Kansas (since June 14, 2022)	Glenn Thompson, Pennsylvania, Ranking Member; Austin Scott, Georgia; Rick Crawford, Arkansas; Scott DesJarlais, Tennessee; Vicky Hartzler, Missouri; Doug LaMalfa, California; Rodney Davis, Illinois; Rick W. Allen, Georgia; David Rouzer, North Carolina; Trent Kelly, Mississippi; Don Bacon, Nebraska; Dusty Johnson, South Dakota; Jim Baird, Indiana; Jim Hagedorn, Minnesota (until February 17, 2022); Chris Jacobs, New York; Troy Balderson, Ohio; Michael Cloud, Texas; Tracey Mann, Kansas; Randy Feenstra, Iowa; Mary Miller, Illinois; Barry Moore, Alabama; Kat Cammack, Florida; Michelle Fischbach, Minnesota; Julia Letlow, Louisiana (until May 2022); Mayra Flores, Texas (since June 22, 2022); Brad Finstad, Minnesota (since September 13, 2022)

Resolutions electing members: H.Res. 9 (Chair), H.Res. 10 (Ranking Member), H.Res. 62 (D), H.Res. 63 (R), H.Res. 92 (D), H.Res. 154 (D), H.Res. 244 (D), H.Res. 311 (R), H.Res. 825 (D), H.Res. 1173 (D), H.Res. 1197 (R), H.Res. 1340 (R)

Subcommittees

Subcommittee	Chair	Ranking Member
Biotechnology, Horticulture, and Research	Stacey Plaskett (D-VI)	Jim Baird (R-IN)
Commodity Exchanges, Energy, and Credit	Antonio Delgado (D-NY)	Michelle Fischbach (R-MN)
Conservation and Forestry	Abigail Spanberger (D-VA)	Doug LaMalfa (R-CA)
General Farm Commodities and Risk Management	Cheri Bustos (D-IL)	Austin Scott (R-GA)
Livestock and Foreign Agriculture	Jim Costa (D-CA)	Dusty Johnson (R-SD)
Nutrition, Oversight, and Department Operations	Jahana Hayes (D-CT)	Don Bacon (R-NE)

=== 118th Congress ===
Majority	Minority
Glenn Thompson, Pennsylvania, Chair; Frank Lucas, Oklahoma; Austin Scott, Georgia; Rick Crawford, Arkansas; Scott DesJarlais, Tennessee; Doug LaMalfa, California; David Rouzer, North Carolina; Trent Kelly, Mississippi; Don Bacon, Nebraska; Mike Bost, Illinois; Dusty Johnson, South Dakota; Jim Baird, Indiana; Tracey Mann, Kansas; Randy Feenstra, Iowa; Mary Miller, Illinois; Barry Moore, Alabama; Kat Cammack, Florida; Brad Finstad, Minnesota; John Rose, Tennessee; Ronny Jackson, Texas; Marc Molinaro, New York; Monica De La Cruz, Texas; Nick Langworthy, New York; John Duarte, California; Zach Nunn, Iowa; Mark Alford, Missouri; Derrick Van Orden, Wisconsin; Lori Chavez-DeRemer, Oregon; Max Miller, Ohio	David Scott, Georgia, Ranking Member; Jim Costa, California; Jim McGovern, Massachusetts; Alma Adams, North Carolina; Abigail Spanberger, Virginia; Jahana Hayes, Connecticut; Shontel Brown, Ohio; Stacey Plaskett, Virgin Islands (until February 28, 2023); Sharice Davids, Kansas; Elissa Slotkin, Michigan; Yadira Caraveo, Colorado; Andrea Salinas, Oregon; Marie Gluesenkamp Perez, Washington; Don Davis, North Carolina; Jill Tokuda, Hawaii; Nikki Budzinski, Illinois; Eric Sorensen, Illinois; Gabe Vasquez, New Mexico; Jasmine Crockett, Texas; Jonathan Jackson, Illinois; Greg Casar, Texas; Chellie Pingree, Maine; Salud Carbajal, California; Angie Craig, Minnesota; Darren Soto, Florida; Sanford Bishop, Georgia (from March 8, 2023)

Resolutions electing members: H.Res. 14 (Chair), H.Res. 15 (Ranking Member), H.Res. 79 (D), H.Res. 80 (R), H.Res. 164 (D), H.Res. 179 (R), H.Res. 205 (D)

Subcommittees

Subcommittee	Chair	Ranking Member
Commodity Markets, Digital Assets, and Rural Development	Dusty Johnson (R-SD)	Yadira Caraveo (D-CO)
Conservation, Research and Biotechnology	Jim Baird (R-IN)	Abigail Spanberger (D-VA)
Forestry	Doug LaMalfa (R-CA)	Andrea Salinas (D-OR)
General Farm Commodities, Risk Management, and Credit	Austin Scott (R-GA)	Shontel Brown (D-OH)
Livestock, Dairy and Poultry	Tracey Mann (R-KS)	Jim Costa (D-CA)
Nutrition, Foreign Agriculture and Horticulture	Brad Finstad (R-MN)	Jahana Hayes (D-CT)

== Leadership ==
Chairs
Name	Party	State	Start	End
Thomas Forrest	Federalist	Pennsylvania	1820	1821
Josiah Butler	Democratic-Republican	New Hampshire	1821	1823
Stephen Van Rensselaer	National Republican	New York	1823	1829
Ambrose Spencer	National Republican	New York	1829	1831
Erastus Root	Democratic	New York	1831	1833
Abraham Bockee	Democratic	New York	1833	1837
Edmund Deberry	Whig	North Carolina	1837	1845
Joseph Anderson	Democratic	New York	1845	1847
Hugh White	Whig	New York	1847	1849
Nathaniel Littlefield	Democratic	Maine	1849	1851
John Floyd	Democratic	New York	1851	1853
John Dawson	Democratic	Pennsylvania	1853	1855
David Holloway	Opposition	Indiana	1855	1857
William Whiteley	Democratic	Delaware	1857	1859
Martin Butterfield	Republican	New York	1859	1861
Owen Lovejoy	Republican	Illinois	1861	1863
Brutus Clay	Union Democratic	Kentucky	1863	1865
John Bidwell	Republican	California	1865	1867
Rowland Trowbridge	Republican	Michigan	1867	1869
John Wilson	Republican	Ohio	1869	1873
Charles Hays	Republican	Alabama	1873	1875
John Caldwell	Democratic	Alabama	1875	1877
Augustus Cutler	Democratic	New Jersey	1877	1879
James Covert	Democratic	New York	1879	1881
Edward Valentine	Republican	Nebraska	1881	1883
William Hatch	Democratic	Missouri	1883	1889
Edward Funston	Republican	Kansas	1889	1891
William Hatch	Democratic	Missouri	1891	1895
James Wadsworth	Republican	New York	1895	1907
Charles Scott	Republican	Kansas	1907	1911
John Lamb	Democratic	Virginia	1911	1913
Asbury Lever	Democratic	South Carolina	1913	1919
Gilbert Haugen	Republican	Iowa	1919	1931
Marvin Jones	Democratic	Texas	1931	1941
Hampton Fulmer	Democratic	South Carolina	1941	1945
John Flannagan	Democratic	Virginia	1945	1947
Clifford Hope	Republican	Kansas	1947	1949
Harold Cooley	Democratic	North Carolina	1949	1953
Clifford Hope	Republican	Kansas	1953	1955
Harold Cooley	Democratic	North Carolina	1955	1967
William Poage	Democratic	Texas	1967	1975
Thomas Foley	Democratic	Washington	1975	1981
Kika de la Garza	Democratic	Texas	1981	1995
Pat Roberts	Republican	Kansas	1995	1997
Robert Smith	Republican	Oregon	1997	1999
Larry Combest	Republican	Texas	1999	2003
Bob Goodlatte	Republican	Virginia	2003	2007
Collin Peterson	Democratic	Minnesota	2007	2011
Frank Lucas	Republican	Oklahoma	2011	2015
Mike Conaway	Republican	Texas	2015	2019
Collin Peterson	Democratic	Minnesota	2019	2021
David Scott	Democratic	Georgia	2021	2023
Glenn Thompson	Republican	Pennsylvania	2023	present

Ranking members
Name	Party	State	Start	End
John Flannagan	Democratic	Virginia	1947	1949
Clifford Hope	Republican	Kansas	1949	1953
Harold Cooley	Democratic	North Carolina	1953	1955
Clifford Hope	Republican	Kansas	1955	1957
August Andresen	Republican	Minnesota	1957	1958
William Hill	Republican	Colorado	1958	1959
Charles Hoeven	Republican	Iowa	1959	1965
Paul Dague	Republican	Pennsylvania	1965	1966
Page Belcher	Republican	Oklahoma	1967	1973
Charles Teague	Republican	California	1973	1974
William Wampler	Republican	Virginia	1974	1983
Ed Madigan	Republican	Illinois	1983	1991
Tom Coleman	Republican	Missouri	1991	1993
Pat Roberts	Republican	Kansas	1993	1995
Kika de la Garza	Democratic	Texas	1995	1997
Charlie Stenholm	Democratic	Texas	1997	2005
Collin Peterson	Democratic	Minnesota	2005	2007
Bob Goodlatte	Republican	Virginia	2007	2009
Frank Lucas	Republican	Oklahoma	2009	2011
Collin Peterson	Democratic	Minnesota	2011	2019
Mike Conaway	Republican	Texas	2019	2021
Glenn Thompson	Republican	Pennsylvania	2021	2023
David Scott	Democratic	Georgia	2023	2025
Angie Craig	Democratic	Minnesota	2025	present

== See also ==
- List of United States House of Representatives committees
- United States House Appropriations Subcommittee on Agriculture, Rural Development, Food and Drug Administration, and Related Agencies
