= Monica De La Cruz =

American politician (born 1974)

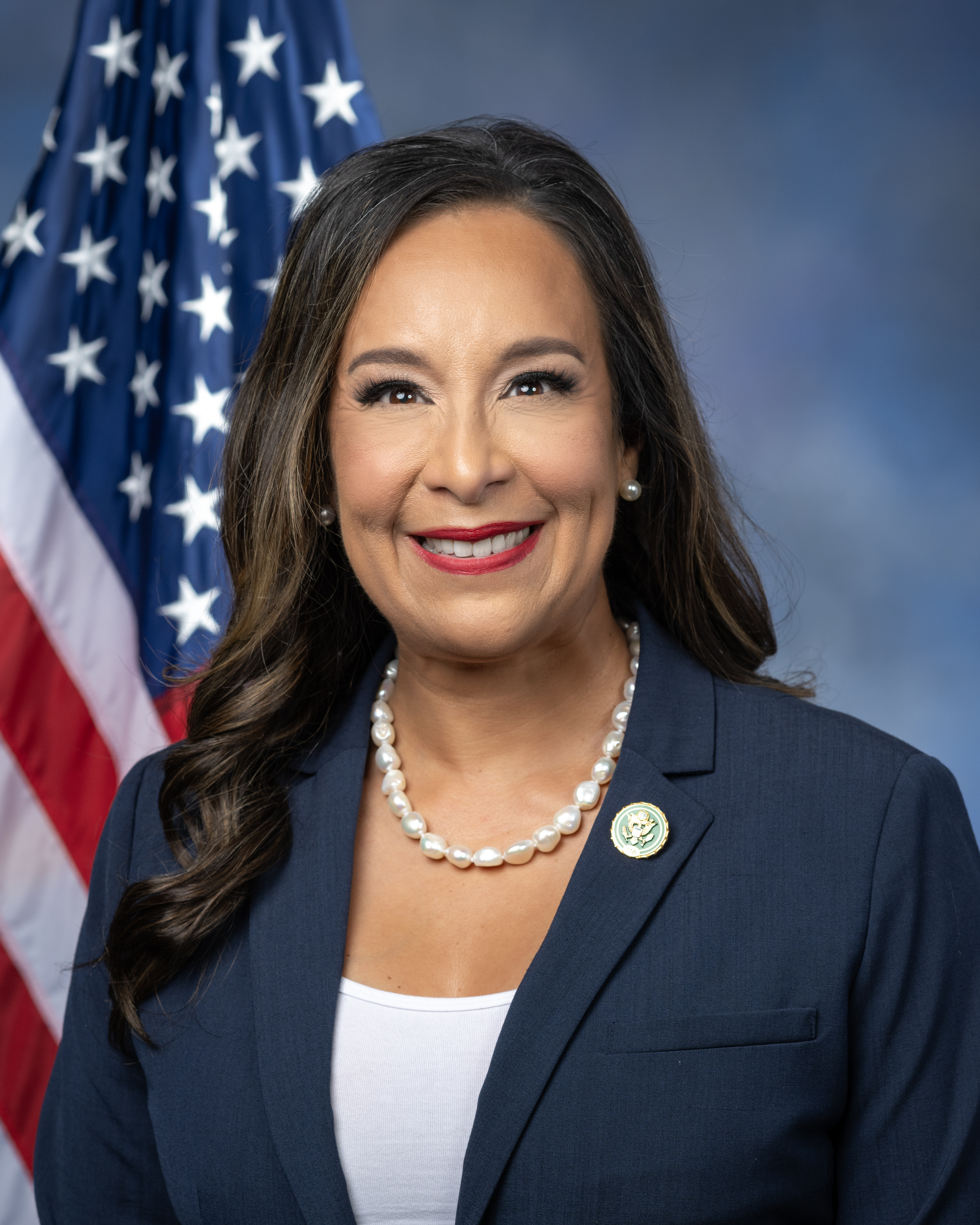
- Official portrait, 2023

Member of the U.S. House of Representatives from Texas's 15th district
- Incumbent
- Assumed office January 3, 2023
- Preceded by: Vicente Gonzalez (redistricted)
- Succeeded by: Bobby Pulido (elect)

Personal details
- Born: November 11, 1974 (age 52) Brownsville, Texas, U.S.
- Party: Republican
- Spouse: Michael Uribe (divorced) Johnny Hernández (m. 2015; div. 2021)
- Children: 2
- Education: University of Texas, San Antonio (BBA)
- Website: House website Campaign website

Monica De La Cruz (born November 11, 1974) is an American politician and insurance agent serving as the U.S. representative for Texas's 15th congressional district since 2023. She is a member of the Republican Party.

De La Cruz was first elected to Congress in 2022, having previously run in 2020. She was re-elected in 2024 and lost to Democrat Bobby Pulido by a wide margin in 2026.

== Early life and career ==
De La Cruz graduated from James Pace Early College High School in Brownsville, Texas, and the University of Texas at San Antonio, studying marketing. She later attended the National Autonomous University of Mexico in Mexico City, studying Spanish. She interned for Turner Entertainment before working for Cartoon Network Latin America. Before being elected to the U.S. Congress, she was an insurance agent and business owner.

== U.S. House of Representatives ==
=== Elections ===
==== 2020 ====
In 2020, De La Cruz ran in Texas's 15th congressional district, and lost to incumbent Democrat Vicente Gonzalez by almost three percentage points.

==== 2022 ====
Endorsed by Donald Trump and House Minority Leader Kevin McCarthy, De La Cruz ran again in the 15th district in 2022, while Gonzalez was redistricted to Texas's 34th congressional district. De La Cruz defeated Democratic nominee Michelle Vallejo in the general election, earning 80,869 votes to Vallejo's 67,913. When she took office in 2023, she became only the eighth person to represent this district since its creation in 1903, and the first Republican. Within a few months, she was the second Republican elected from a Río Grande Valley county in over a century; the first, Mayra Flores, was elected to a partial term in a neighboring district in 2022. De La Cruz is the first Republican elected to a full term after it was redrawn.

==== 2024 ====
De La Cruz ran for re-election in 2024 and faced Michelle Vallejo in the general election. De La Cruz was re-elected by 14 points.

=== Tenure ===
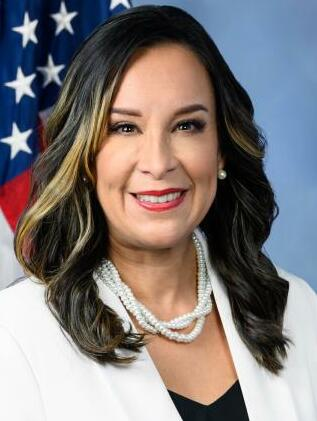
De La Cruz during the 118th Congress

In July 2023, De La Cruz voted for a House resolution expressing support for Israel (H.Con.Res.57), saying: "The State of Israel is a strong American ally and a friend to South Texas. Contrary to the anti-semetic hatred spewed by some in Congress, Israel is not a racist state." She later voted to provide Israel with support following the 2023 Hamas attack on Israel.

In March 2024, De La Cruz delivered the Republican response to President Joe Biden's 2024 State of the Union Address in Spanish.

In June 2024, Politico reported that De La Cruz had earmarked $2.4 million in taxpayer funds to Angels of Love Advocacy Project, an organization founded by Della Fay Pérez. The two were set to appear at a press conference together in late May until Pérez was arrested days prior for allegedly stealing $500,000 from Ponzi scheme victims.

Politico noted that De La Cruz had shifted her rhetoric on immigration amid the second Trump administration's aggressive deportation campaign. She ran for the 2024 election on a policy of mass deportations. By early 2026, she said she wanted deportations to focus on the "worst of the worst" and that new visa categories should be created for undocumented immigrants so that they could work in agriculture and construction.

In June 2026, De La Cruz assisted in getting a nun from Nigeria, Leticia "Letty" Ugboaja, released from ICE custody after she was arrested while walking along a road to attend mass in McAllen, Texas.

=== Committee assignments ===
For the 119th Congress:

- Committee on Agriculture
  - Subcommittee on General Farm Commodities, Risk Management, and Credit
  - Subcommittee on Nutrition and Foreign Agriculture (Vice Chair)
- Committee on Financial Services
  - Subcommittee on Financial Institutions
  - Subcommittee on Housing and Insurance (Vice Chairwoman)

=== Caucus memberships ===
- Republican Main Street Partnership
- Congressional Western Caucus

== Personal life ==
De La Cruz is an Episcopalian.

She has been married twice and has two children. During her 2021 divorce from her second husband, Hernández, he alleged in court filings that she was physically and verbally abusive to his daughter; she denied the allegations.

Her brother, Carlos, is running for the redrawn Texas's 35th congressional district in 2026.

== See also ==
- List of Hispanic and Latino Americans in the United States Congress

U.S. House of Representatives
Preceded by Vicente Gonzalez	Member of the U.S. House of Representatives from Texas's 15th congressional district 2023–present	Incumbent
Preceded by Kat Cammack	Chair of the Congressional Women's Caucus; 2025–present	Incumbent
U.S. order of precedence (ceremonial)
Preceded by Don Davis	United States representatives by seniority 303rd	Succeeded by Chris Deluzio
