= United States House Agriculture Subcommittee on Conservation, Research, and Biotechnology =

Subcommittee of the House Agriculture Committee

Subcommittee of Committee on Agriculture
- Active United States House of Representatives; 119th Congress

Leadership
- Chair: Frank Lucas (R)
- Ranking Member: Jill N. Tokuda (D)

Structure
- Seats: 19 (19 currently filled) 10/10 9/9
- Political parties: Majority (10): Republican (10); Minority (9): Democratic (9)

Meeting place
- 1301, Longworth House Office Building; Washington, D.C. 20515

Phone number
- (202)-225-2171

The House Subcommittee on Conservation, Research, and Biotechnology is a subcommittee within the House Agriculture Committee. It was first created during the 110th Congress as the Subcommittee on Horticulture and Organic Agriculture, though horticulture is no longer under its jurisdiction.

It is currently chaired by Republican Jim Baird of Indiana. Its Ranking Member is Democrat Jill Tokuda of Hawaii.

== Jurisdiction ==
Policies and statutes related to resource conservation; pest and disease management, including pesticides; bioterrorism; adulteration and quarantine matters; research, education, and extension; biotechnology; and related oversight of such issues.

== Members, 119th Congress ==
Majority	Minority
Frank Lucas, Oklahoma, Chair; Jim Baird, Indiana, Vice Chair; Don Bacon, Nebraska; Randy Feenstra, Iowa; Mary Miller, Illinois; John Rose, Tennessee; Ronny Jackson, Texas; Dan Newhouse, Washington; Rob Bresnahan, Pennsylvania; Mark Messmer, Indiana	Jill Tokuda, Hawaii, Ranking Member; Gabe Vasquez, New Mexico, Vice Ranking Member; Alma Adams, North Carolina; Sharice Davids, Kansas; Nikki Budzinski, Illinois; Eric Sorensen, Illinois; Eugene Vindman, Virginia; John Mannion, New York; April McClain Delaney, Maryland
Ex officio
Glenn Thompson, Pennsylvania	Angie Craig, Minnesota

== Historical membership rosters ==
=== 115th Congress ===
Majority	Minority
Rodney Davis, Illinois, Chairman; Bob Gibbs, Ohio; Jeff Denham, California; Ted Yoho, Florida; David Rouzer, North Carolina; Don Bacon, Nebraska; Neal Dunn, Florida; Jodey Arrington, Texas	Michelle Lujan Grisham, New Mexico, Ranking Member; Al Lawson, Florida; Jimmy Panetta, California; Jim Costa, California; Jim McGovern, Massachusetts; Lisa Blunt Rochester, Delaware
Ex officio
Mike Conaway, Texas	Collin Peterson, Minnesota

=== 116th Congress ===
Majority	Minority
Stacey Plaskett, U.S. Virgin Islands, Chair; Antonio Delgado, New York; TJ Cox, California; Josh Harder, California; Anthony Brindisi, New York; Kim Schrier, Washington; Chellie Pingree, Maine; Salud Carbajal, California; Jimmy Panetta, California; Sean Patrick Maloney, New York; Al Lawson, Florida	Neal Dunn, Florida, Ranking Member; Glenn Thompson, Pennsylvania; Vicky Hartzler, Missouri; Doug LaMalfa, California; Rodney Davis, Illinois; Ted Yoho, Florida; Mike Bost, Illinois; James Comer, Kentucky; Jim Baird, Indiana
Ex officio
Collin Peterson, Minnesota	Mike Conaway, Texas

=== 117th Congress ===
Majority	Minority
Stacey Plaskett, U.S. Virgin Islands, Chair; Antonio Delgado, New York; Kim Schrier, Washington; Jimmy Panetta, California; Chellie Pingree, Maine; Sean Patrick Maloney, New York; Salud Carbajal, California; Al Lawson, Florida; Josh Harder, California; Lou Correa, California; Ann Kirkpatrick, Arizona	Jim Baird, Indiana, Ranking Member; Austin Scott, Georgia; Rick Crawford, Arkansas; Neal Dunn, Florida; Rodney Davis, Illinois; Don Bacon, Nebraska; Jim Hagedorn, Minnesota (until February 17, 2022); Chris Jacobs, New York; Troy Balderson, Ohio; Michelle Fischbach, Minnesota
Ex officio
David Scott, Georgia	Glenn Thompson, Pennsylvania

=== 118th Congress ===
Majority	Minority
Jim Baird, Indiana, Chair; Frank Lucas, Oklahoma; Mary Miller, Illinois; Kat Cammack, Florida; Brad Finstad, Minnesota; John Duarte, California; Mark Alford, Missouri	Abigail Spanberger, Virginia, Ranking Member; Sharice Davids, Kansas; Elissa Slotkin, Michigan; Nikki Budzinski, Illinois; Eric Sorensen, Illinois; Jill Tokuda, Hawaii; Gabe Vasquez, New Mexico
Ex officio
Glenn Thompson, Pennsylvania	David Scott, Georgia
