= Congressional Western Caucus =

Caucus of the U.S. House of Representatives

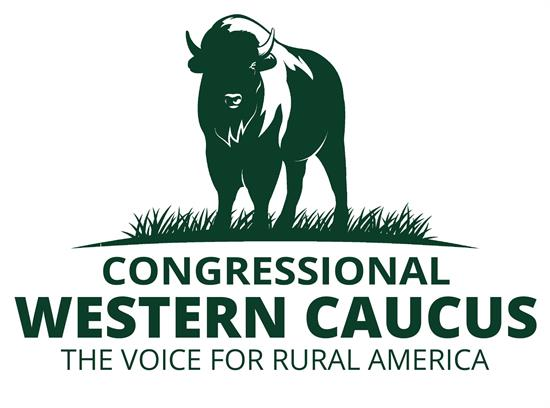
- Chair: Celeste Maloy (UT-02)
- Founded: 1993; 33 years ago
- Headquarters: Cannon House Office Building
- Seats in the House Republican Conference: 86 / 219
- Seats in the House: 86 / 435

Website
- Western Caucus

The Congressional Western Caucus is a caucus within the United States House of Representatives currently composed of 86 members. Although it has historically been bipartisan, it is composed almost entirely of Republicans. It was founded by then-representatives James V. Hansen (R-Utah), Bob Stump (R-Arizona), Joe Skeen (R-New Mexico) and Barbara Vucanovich (R-Nevada) in 1993 during the 103rd United States Congress. Despite its name, the Congressional Western Caucus has members from outside the Western United States, including as far east as New York City.

== Members ==
Members serve in the 119th United States Congress. Members who will not serve in the House of Representatives as of the 120th United States Congress are marked as Outgoing. Last updated: November 18, 2026

Alabama

- Barry Moore (R‑AL‑2) - Outgoing (Elected to the Senate)
- Gary Palmer (R‑AL‑6)

Alaska

- Nick Begich (R‑AK‑AL) (executive vice chair)

American Samoa

- Amata Coleman Radewagen (R‑AS‑AL) (vice chair)

Arizona

- Eli Crane (R‑AZ‑2)
- Andy Biggs (R‑AZ‑5) - Outgoing (Ran unsuccessfully for governor)
- Juan Ciscomani (R‑AZ‑6) - Outgoing (Defeated)
- Paul Gosar (R‑AZ‑9)

Arkansas

- Rick Crawford (R‑AR‑1)
- Bruce Westerman (R‑AR‑4)(vice chair)

California

- James Gallagher(R‑CA‑1) - Outgoing (Defeated)
- Kevin Kiley (I‑CA‑3) - Outgoing (Defeated)
- Tom McClintock (R‑CA‑5)
- Vince Fong (R‑CA‑20)
- David Valadao (R‑CA‑22) - Outgoing (Defeated)
- Jay Obernolte (R‑CA‑23) (vice chair)
- Ken Calvert (R‑CA‑41)
- Darrell Issa (R‑CA‑48)

Colorado

- Jeff Hurd (R‑CO‑3) (vice chair)
- Lauren Boebert (R‑CO‑4) - Outgoing (Defeated)
- Jeff Crank (R‑CO‑5) - Outgoing (Defeated)

Florida

- Greg Steube (R‑FL‑17)

Georgia

- Buddy Carter (R‑GA‑1) - Outgoing (Ran unsuccessfully for Senate)
- Austin Scott (R‑GA‑8)

Idaho

- Russ Fulcher (R‑ID‑1)
- Mike Simpson (R‑ID‑2)

Illinois

- Mike Bost (R‑IL‑12)

Indiana

- Jim Baird (R‑IN‑4)
- Mark Messmer (R‑IN‑8)
- Erin Houchin (R‑IN‑9)

Kansas

- Ron Estes (R‑KS‑4)

Kentucky

- James Comer (R‑KY‑1)

Louisiana

- Steve Scalise (R‑LA‑1)
- Clay Higgins (R‑LA‑3)
- Mike Johnson (R‑LA‑4)

Michigan

- Tim Walberg (R‑MI‑5)

Minnesota

- Brad Finstad (R‑MN‑1) - Outgoing (Defeated)
- Tom Emmer (R‑MN‑6)
- Michelle Fischbach (R‑MN‑7) (vice chair)
- Pete Stauber (R‑MN‑8) (vice chair)

Missouri

- Bob Onder (R‑MO‑3)
- Mark Alford (R‑MO‑4)
- Jason Smith (R‑MO‑8)

Montana

- Ryan Zinke (R‑MT‑1) (vice chair) - Outgoing (Ran for reelection, then withdrew)
- Troy Downing (R‑MT‑2)

Nebraska

- Mike Flood (R‑NE‑1)
- Adrian Smith (R‑NE‑3) (vice chair)

Nevada

- Mark Amodei (R‑NV‑2) (vice chair) - Outgoing (Retired)

New York

- Nicole Malliotakis (R‑NY‑11)

North Carolina

- Greg Murphy (R‑NC‑3) - Outgoing (Defeated)
- David Rouzer (R‑NC‑7)
- Tim Moore (R‑NC‑14) - Outgoing (Defeated)

North Dakota

- Julie Fedorchak (R‑ND‑AL)

Ohio

- Max Miller (R‑OH‑7) - Outgoing (Defeated)
- David Joyce (R‑OH‑14)
- Troy Balderson (R‑OH‑12)

Oklahoma

- Kevin Hern (R‑OK‑1) - Outgoing (Elected to the Senate)
- Frank Lucas (R‑OK‑3)

Oregon

- Cliff Bentz (R‑OR‑2) (vice chair)

Pennsylvania

- Glenn Thompson (R‑PA‑15)

South Carolina

- Russell Fry (R‑SC‑7)

South Dakota

- Dusty Johnson (R‑SD‑AL) - Outgoing (Ran unsuccessfully for governor)

Tennessee

- Chuck Fleischmann (R‑TN‑3)

Texas

- Dan Crenshaw (R‑TX‑2) - Outgoing (Lost renomination)
- Pat Fallon (R‑TX‑4)
- Jake Ellzey (R‑TX‑6)
- August Pfluger (R‑TX‑11)
- Monica De La Cruz (R‑TX‑15) - Outgoing (Defeated)
- Jodey Arrington (R‑TX‑19) - Outgoing (Retired)
- Beth Van Duyne (R‑TX‑24)
- John Carter (R‑TX‑31)
- Brian Babin (R‑TX‑36)

Utah

- Blake Moore (R‑UT‑1)
- Celeste Maloy (R‑UT‑2) (chair)
- Mike Kennedy (R‑UT‑3)
- Burgess Owens (R‑UT‑4) - Outgoing (Ran for reelection, then withdrew)

Virginia

- Rob Wittman (R‑VA‑1) - Outgoing (Defeated)
- Ben Cline (R‑VA‑6)
- Morgan Griffith (R‑VA‑9)

Washington

- Dan Newhouse (R‑WA‑4) (vice chair) - Outgoing (Retired)

West Virginia

- Carol Miller (R‑WV‑1)

Wisconsin

- Scott Fitzgerald (R‑WI‑5)
- Glenn Grothman (R‑WI‑6)
- Tom Tiffany (R‑WI‑7) - Outgoing (Ran unsuccessfully for governor)
- Tony Wied (R‑WI‑8)

Wyoming

- Harriet Hageman (R‑WY‑AL) (vice chair) - Outgoing (Elected to the Senate)
