= Jim Baird (politician) =

American politician (born 1945)

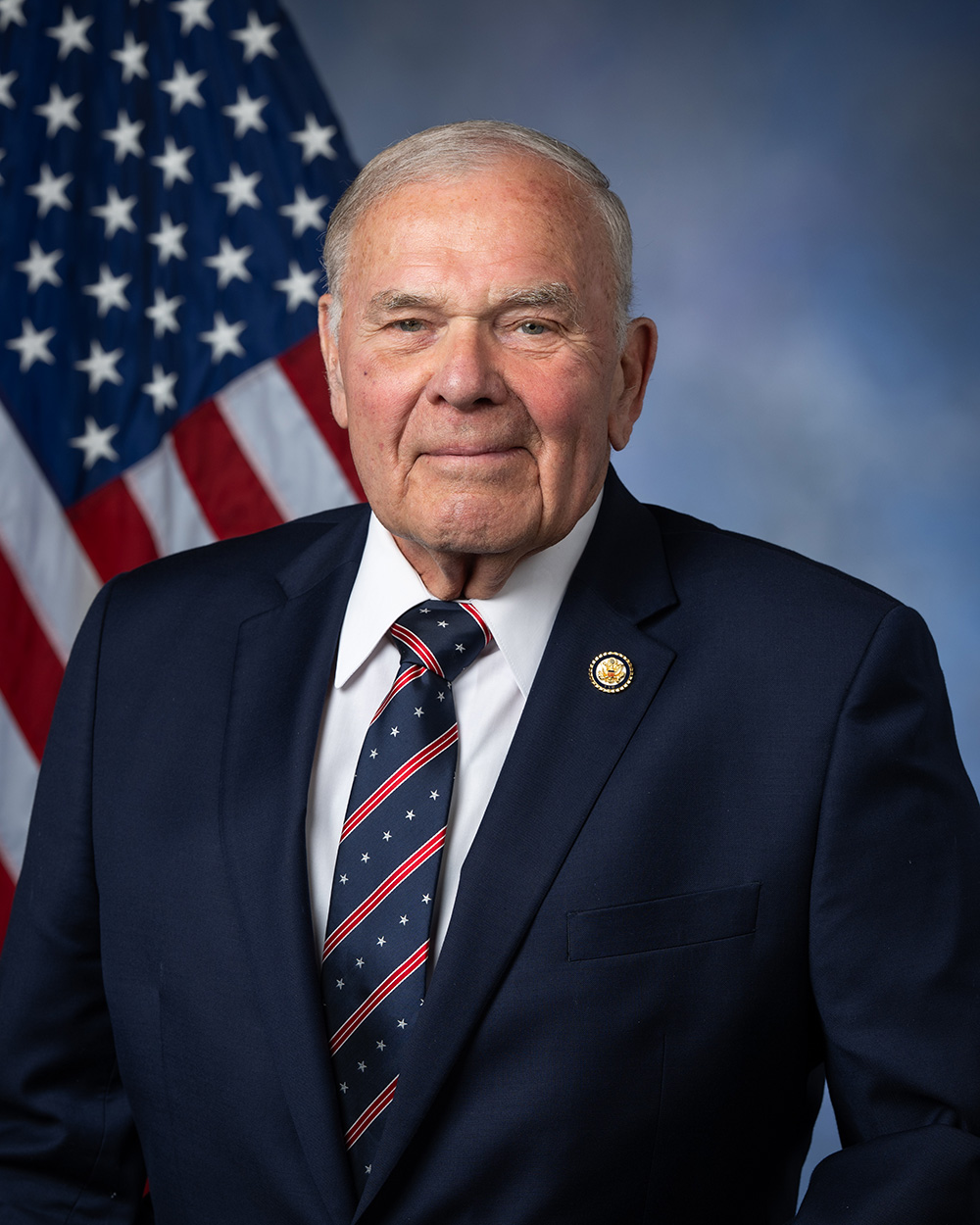
- Official portrait, 2026

Member of the U.S. House of Representatives from Indiana's 4th district
- Incumbent
- Assumed office January 3, 2019
- Preceded by: Todd Rokita

Member of the Indiana House of Representatives from the 44th district
- In office November 16, 2010 – November 20, 2018
- Preceded by: Nancy Michael
- Succeeded by: Beau Baird

Personal details
- Born: James Richard Baird; June 4, 1945 (age 81) Fountain County, Indiana, U.S.
- Party: Republican
- Spouse: Danise Baird (m. 1967; died 2026)
- Children: 3, including Beau
- Education: Purdue University (BS, MS); University of Kentucky (PhD)
- Website: House website

Military service
- Branch/service: United States Army
- Years of service: 1969–1972
- Rank: Second Lieutenant
- Unit: 523rd Transportation Company
- Battles/wars: Vietnam War (WIA)
- Awards: Bronze Star Medal; Purple Heart

Academic background
- Thesis: Effects of Lactose, Dried Whey, Enzyme Supplementation and Presoaking of the Diet on Early-Weaned Pig Performance and Nutrient Utilization (1983)

James Richard Baird (born June 4, 1945) is an American businessman and politician serving as the U.S. representative for Indiana's 4th congressional district since 2019. A Republican, he previously served as a member of the Indiana House of Representatives from 2010 to 2018 and as a Putnam County commissioner from 2006 to 2010.

Baird was first elected to Congress in 2018.

== Early life and education ==
Baird was born in 1945 to William (1916–1989) and Martha Ewbank Baird (1924–1998). William was born in Scotland. Baird graduated from Turkey Run High School in 1963, participating in 4-H and Future Farmers of America. He obtained a Bachelor of Science in animal science from Purdue University in 1967 and a Master's of Science in animal science from Purdue in 1969. After the Vietnam War, Baird earned a PhD in animal science monogastric nutrition from the University of Kentucky in 1975.

== Military service ==
Baird served in the ROTC at Purdue University from 1963 to 1965. He attended the Officer Candidate School Class 2–70 at Fort Benning and Jungle Warfare School in Panama from 1969 to 1970 and was commissioned in the Infantry. The United States Army was sending infantry divisions home when Second Lieutenant Baird arrived in Vietnam in 1970. Because of the excess of Infantry officers, he was assigned to the 523rd Transportation Company (Light Truck) at Cha Rang Valley.

The truck companies of the 8th Transportation Group delivered cargo along the most heavily ambushed road in Vietnam, QL19, through the Central Highlands in the northern II Corps Tactical Zone. The 523rd had five 5-ton gun trucks at the time. The Group Commander selected the 523rd as one of the two light truck companies to be deployed north to I Corps Tactical Zone for the upcoming Laotian Incursion, Operation Lam Son 719, in February through April 1971. The 523rd was attached to the 39th Transportation Battalion and stationed at the abandoned Marine Corps base Camp Vandergrift. During the two-and-a-half-month incursion into Laos, the North Vietnamese Army tried to close down the supply route with 23 convoy ambushes. Baird fought in two of the operation's deadliest ambushes and lost his left arm during the convoy ambush on March 12, 1971. He earned a Bronze Star and two Purple Hearts. In 2012, the 523rd Transportation Company was inducted into the Transportation Corps Hall of Fame for its heroism during Operation Lam Son 719.

Baird was fondly nicknamed "pig farmer" by fellow infantrymen because of his passion for breeding pigs.

=== Badges, medals, and ribbons ===
- Combat Infantry Badge
- Bronze Star with valor "V" device
- Purple Heart with Oak Leaf Cluster
- Vietnam Service Medal
- Army Commendation Medal with valor "V" device
- National Defense Service Medal
- Meritorious Unit Commendation
- Vietnam Campaign Medal with 60 Device
- Vietnam Cross of Gallantry with Palm for valorous combat achievement
- Vietnam Civil Actions Medal
- Expert Rifleman
- Jungle Expert Badge

== Career ==
From 1974 to 1983, Baird served as a Purdue University extension agent for Putnam County. Baird is the owner of Baird Family Farms, Triple Tree Enterprises, Inc. (a gas station operator in Crawfordsville), and Indiana Home Care Plus of Greencastle, a home health agency. He previously worked as an animal nutritionist at Landmark Cooperative, a feed manufacturer, and as director of sales and nutrition at Agmax.

Baird ran for Putnam County commissioner in 2006 and defeated the incumbent, Dennis O'Hair, in the primary. He represented Marion Township, Greencastle Township, Madison Township, and Clinton Township. He served as commissioner for the second district until his election to the State House in 2010. He was succeeded by Nancy Fogle. The American Conservative Union gave him a lifetime legislative evaluation of 82% in 2017.

== Indiana House of Representatives ==
Baird represented House District 44, including Putnam County and portions of Clay, Morgan, Owen, and Parke counties, from 2010 until 2018. He served as a member of the Ways and Means Committee—chairing the Health and Medicaid Subcommittee—the Agriculture and Rural Development Committee, Veteran Affairs and Public Safety, the Environmental Affairs Committee, and the Statutory Committee on Ethics.

== U.S. House of Representatives ==
=== Elections ===
==== 2018 ====
Baird ran for Indiana's 4th congressional district in 2018. The seat was vacated by Todd Rokita in his unsuccessful run for U.S. Senate. Baird won the May 8 Republican primary and the November 6 general election.

==== 2020 ====
Baird was reelected in 2020 with 66.6% of the vote.

==== 2022 ====
Baird was reelected in 2022 with 68.2% of the vote.

==== 2024 ====
Baird was reelected in 2024 with 64.8% of the vote.

=== Tenure ===
Baird was the second-oldest member of the 116th Congress freshman class, after Democrat and former Secretary of Health and Human Services Donna Shalala, who was born in 1941.

Baird is one of three deployed Vietnam War veterans currently serving in the House, the others being Jack Bergman and Mike Thompson.

Baird voted to provide Israel with support following 2023 Hamas attack on Israel.

Baird was ranked the Republican Member of Congress with highest turnover of 2023—second most over all in the House—per LegiStorm's Worst Bosses Index, at three times the House average.

In 2021, Baird was one of 30 Republicans who voted for the Farm Workforce Modernization Act, which would grant legal status to certain illegal immigrants working in agriculture and establish a pathway to permanent residency contingent on continued farm work.

In 2026, Baird was a cosponsor of the DIGNIDAD Act, which proposes a pathway to legal status for up to 12 million illegal immigrants, paired with stricter border enforcement and mandatory work and restitution requirements.

=== Committee assignments ===
For the 118th Congress:

- Committee on Agriculture
  - Subcommittee on Conservation, Research, and Biotechnology (Chair)
  - Subcommittee on Livestock, Dairy, and Poultry
  - Subcommittee on Nutrition, Foreign Agriculture, and Horticulture
- Committee on Foreign Affairs
  - Subcommittee on Africa
  - Subcommittee on the Middle East, North Africa and Central Asia
- Committee on Science, Space, and Technology
  - Subcommittee on Energy
  - Subcommittee on Research and Technology

=== Caucus memberships ===
- Aerospace Caucus
- Agriculture Research Caucus, co-chair
- Biofuels Caucus
- Border Security Caucus
- Congressional Western Caucus
- Conservative Climate Caucus
- Election Integrity Caucus
- For Country Caucus
- Future Farmers of America Caucus
- Main Street Caucus
- Recreational Vehicle Caucus
- Republican Study Committee
- Research & Development Caucus, co-chair
- Rural Broadband Caucus
- Wine Caucus

== Electoral history ==
Republican primary results, 2018
Party	Candidate	Votes	%
Republican	Jim Baird	29,316	36.6
Republican	Steve Braun	23,594	29.4
Republican	Diego Morales	11,994	15.0
Republican	Jared Thomas	8,453	10.5
Republican	Kevin Grant	3,667	4.6
Republican	James Nease	2,096	2.6
Republican	Tim Radice	1,022	1.3
Total votes		80,142	100.0

Indiana's 4th congressional district, 2018
Party	Candidate	Votes	%
Republican	Jim Baird	156,539	64.1
Democratic	Tobi Beck	87,824	35.9
Total votes		244,363	100.0
Republican hold			

Indiana's 4th congressional district, 2020
Party	Candidate	Votes	%
Republican	Jim Baird	225,531	66.6
Democratic	Joe Mackey	112,984	33.4
Total votes		338,515	100.0
Republican hold			

Indiana's 4th congressional district, 2022
Party	Candidate	Votes	%
Republican	Jim Baird	134,442	68.2
Democratic	Roger Day	62,668	31.8
Total votes		197,110	100.0
Republican hold			

Indiana's 4th congressional district, 2024
Party	Candidate	Votes	%
Republican	Jim Baird (incumbent)	209,794	64.8
Democratic	Derrick Holder	100,091	30.9
Libertarian	Ashley Groff	13,710	4.2
Total votes		323,595	100.0

== Personal life ==
Baird was married to Danise (née Swain), born August 7, 1948, a registered nurse who graduated from Purdue University, in 1966. Baird has three children: daughter Vanessa Lee Norsworthy (born 1968) and sons Stacey Gilbert (born 1972) and Jason Beau (born 1981). Jason Beau was elected chair of the Putnam County, Indiana, Republican Party in March 2017 and ran to replace his father in the Indiana House of Representatives. He won the election on November 6, 2018.

Baird resides outside of Greencastle, Indiana, in Clinton Township. Baird has attended Gobin United Methodist Church in Greencastle since 1975.

=== 2026 vehicle crash ===
On January 5, 2026, Baird and his wife, Danise, were injured in a car accident involving four other vehicles while traveling from Indiana to Washington, D.C. Danise was driving. Both were hospitalized. Their son Beau said they were "safe, stable, and in good spirits". Despite initial descriptions of the event by Beau as a "hit-and-run" accident, investigators found there to be no intentional wrongdoing. Investigators did find the driver of another vehicle at fault, citing an unsafe lane change. Danise later died of complications from the car accident on March 1, 2026.

U.S. House of Representatives
Preceded by Todd Rokita	Member of the U.S. House of Representatives from Indiana's 4th congressional district 2019–present	Incumbent
U.S. order of precedence (ceremonial)
Preceded by Tom Suozzi	United States representatives by seniority 189th	Succeeded by Tim Burchett
