= Don Bacon =

American politician (born 1963)

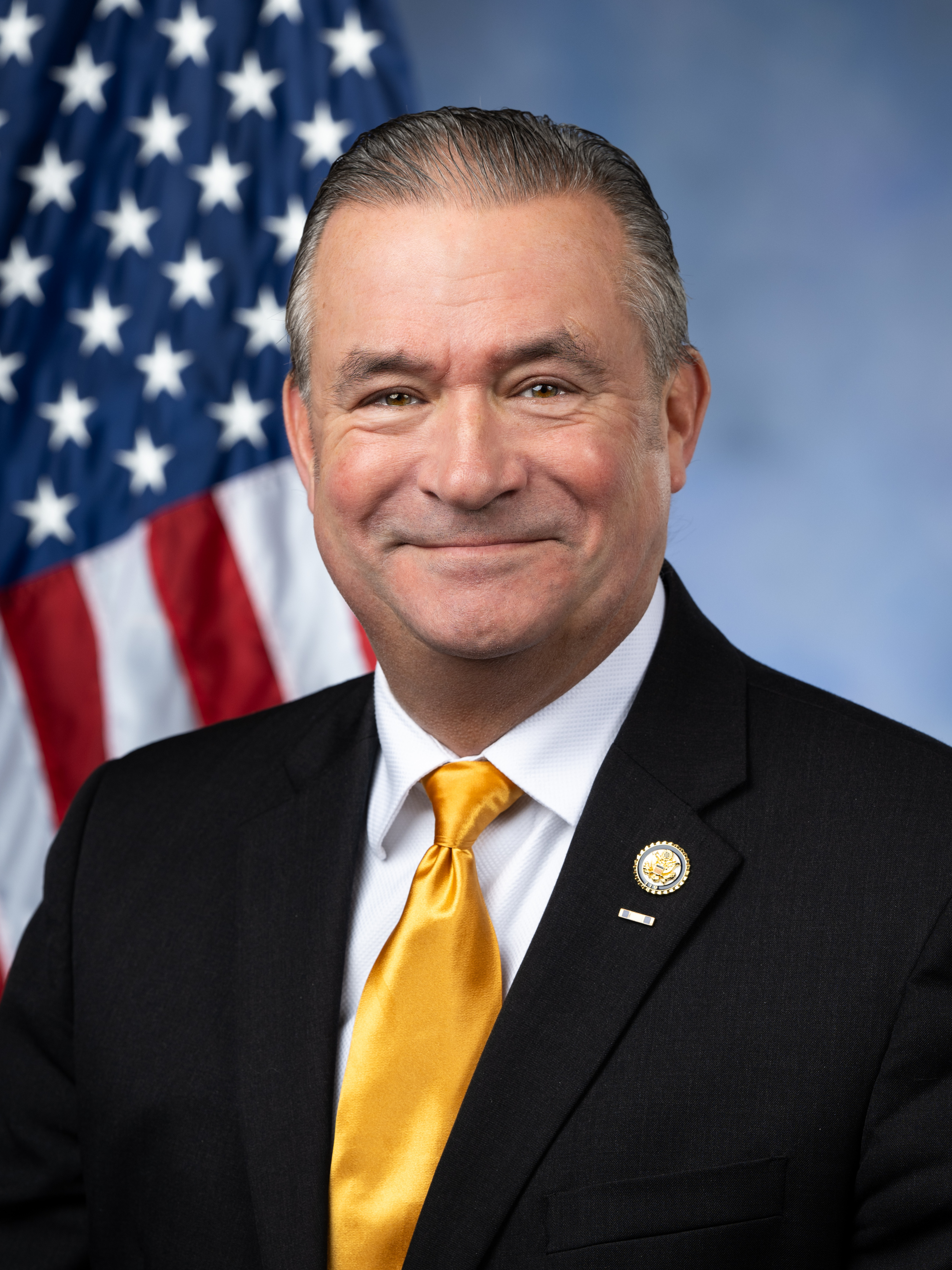
- Official portrait, 2025

Member of the U.S. House of Representatives from Nebraska's 2nd district
- Incumbent
- Assumed office January 3, 2017
- Preceded by: Brad Ashford

Personal details
- Born: Donald John Bacon; August 16, 1963 (age 63) Chicago Heights, Illinois, U.S.
- Party: Republican
- Spouse: Angie Hardison (m. 1984)
- Children: 4
- Education: Northern Illinois University (BA); University of Phoenix (MBA); National War College (MA)
- Website: House website Campaign website
- Nickname: "Bits"

Military service
- Allegiance: United States
- Branch/service: United States Air Force
- Years of service: 1985–2014
- Rank: Brigadier General
- Commands: 41st Electronic Combat Squadron; 435th Air Base Wing; 55th Wing
- Battles/wars: Global war on terrorism; Iraq War; War in Afghanistan
- Bacon's voice Bacon recognizing Judi gaiashkibos, a Ponca Tribe of Nebraska descendant, as part of Native American Heritage Month; Recorded September 27, 2018

Donald John Bacon (born August 16, 1963) is an American politician and retired military officer who has served as the U.S. representative for Nebraska's 2nd congressional district since 2017. During his 29 years in the United States Air Force, he commanded wings at Ramstein Air Base, Germany, and Offutt Air Force Base south of Omaha, Nebraska, before retiring as a brigadier general in 2014. A member of the Republican Party, his district includes all of Omaha and the areas surrounding the Offutt base.

Bacon is often considered a centrist or moderate Republican. He is a member of the bipartisan Problem Solvers Caucus and represents a district carried by Democratic presidential candidates in 2020 and 2024. He is a vocal critic of Donald Trump, who has derided him as a "rebel", and has repeatedly sparred with members of the House Freedom Caucus. Bacon self-identifies as a Reagan Republican.

While in Congress, Bacon was an original sponsor of the Naming Commission, the Emmett Till Antilynching Act, and voted for the Respect for Marriage Act. He was one of 37 Republicans who rejected attempts to overturn the 2020 election, and one of 35 who supported the committee to investigate the January 6th attack. As an active voice on foreign policy, Bacon is one of a slate of U.S. representatives sanctioned by the Russian government and was the first member of Congress to be hacked by the Chinese government.

After Trump's efforts to pass his "Big Beautiful Bill", Bacon announced he would not be seeking re-election in 2026, citing a desire to spend more time with his grandchildren. He ultimately voted for the legislation.

== Early life, education, and military career ==
Donald John Bacon was born in Chicago Heights, Illinois, on August 16, 1963, the son of Donald and Joan Bacon of Bourbonnais. He grew up on a family farm in Momence, Illinois, and graduated from Grace Baptist Academy in Kankakee in 1980.

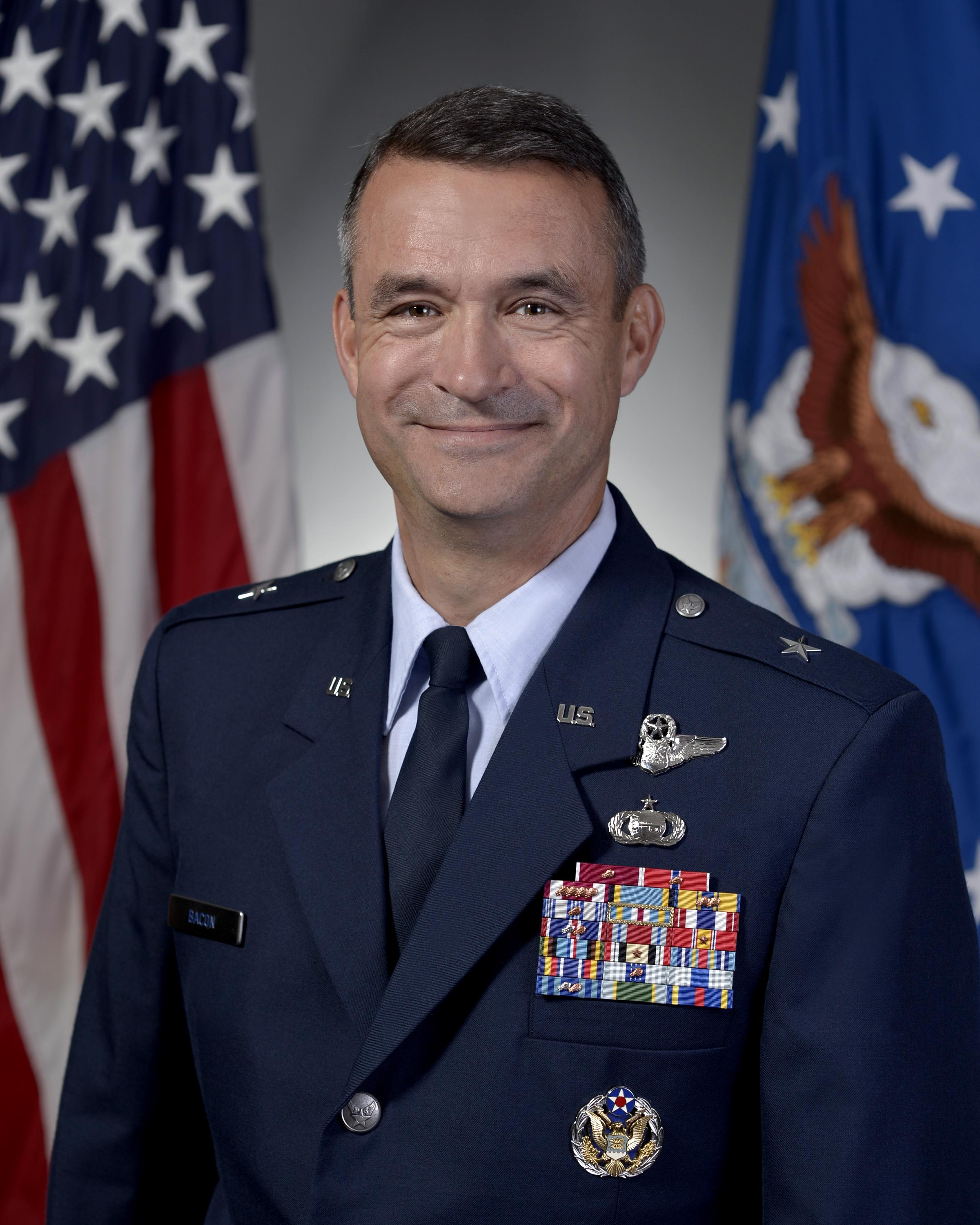
Brigadier General Don Bacon in 2013

Bacon attended Northern Illinois University and interned in Representative Ed Madigan's Washington, D.C., office during his senior year in 1984. He entered the Air Force in 1985, commissioning through the Air Force Officer Training School at Lackland AFB, Texas. In his military career he specialized in electronic warfare, intelligence, reconnaissance and public affairs, and also qualified as a master navigator. He served as a wing commander at Ramstein Air Base in Germany and at Offutt Air Force Base in Nebraska, as a group commander and squadron commander at Davis–Monthan Air Force Base in Arizona and an expeditionary squadron commander in Iraq. Bacon has earned master's degrees from the National War College and the University of Phoenix. At the Pentagon, he served as a public affairs aide for General David Petraeus, before his final assignment as the Air Force's director of ISR strategy, plans, doctrine and force development from July 2012.

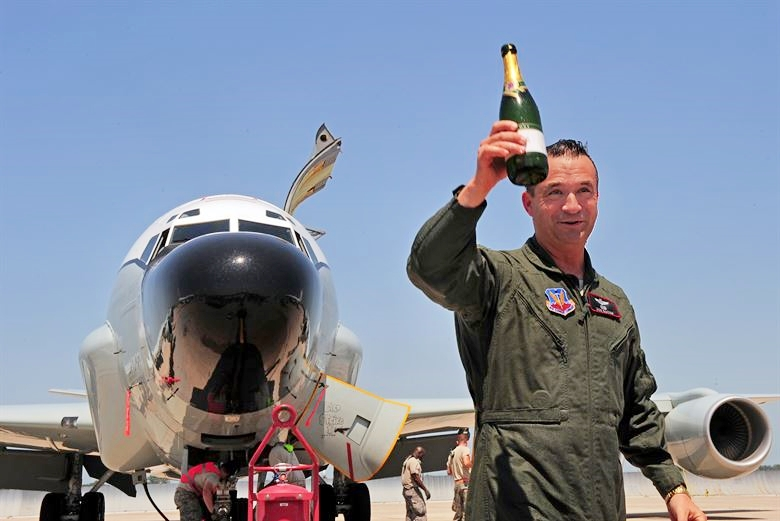
Brigadier General Donald Bacon, 55th Wing Commander, salutes the men and women attending his final flight at Offutt Air Force Base, Nebraska.

In 2014, Bacon retired from the U.S. Air Force. During his 29 years in the Air Force, he was awarded the Air Force Distinguished Service Medal, two Legion of Merits and two Bronze Star Medals; he was selected as Europe's top Air Force wing commander in 2009. He served as an aide to U.S. representative Jeff Fortenberry and assistant professor at Bellevue University before running for office.

== Political career ==
=== Elections ===
==== 2016 ====
In the 2016 elections, Bacon won the Republican primary for the U.S. House of Representatives in Nebraska's 2nd congressional district, a primarily urban and suburban district in metro Omaha, covering parts of Douglas and Sarpy counties.

The general election race was considered a tossup, with Democratic incumbent Brad Ashford seen as having a slight edge. After a 2005 videotape showing Donald Trump making lewd remarks to Billy Bush surfaced in October 2016, Bacon said that Trump could not win the presidency and should withdraw from the race in favor of "a strong conservative candidate, like Mike Pence." But Bacon did not say that he would not vote for Donald Trump, since he did not "believe Hillary is the right person. I'm in a quandary."

Bacon narrowly defeated Ashford in the general election on November 8, 2016, with 48.9% of the vote to Ashford's 47.7%. He was the only Republican to defeat an incumbent Democrat in the 2016 House elections.

==== 2018 ====
Bacon was reelected in 2018, narrowly defeating progressive Democrat Kara Eastman with 51.0% of the vote to her 49.0%.

==== 2020 ====
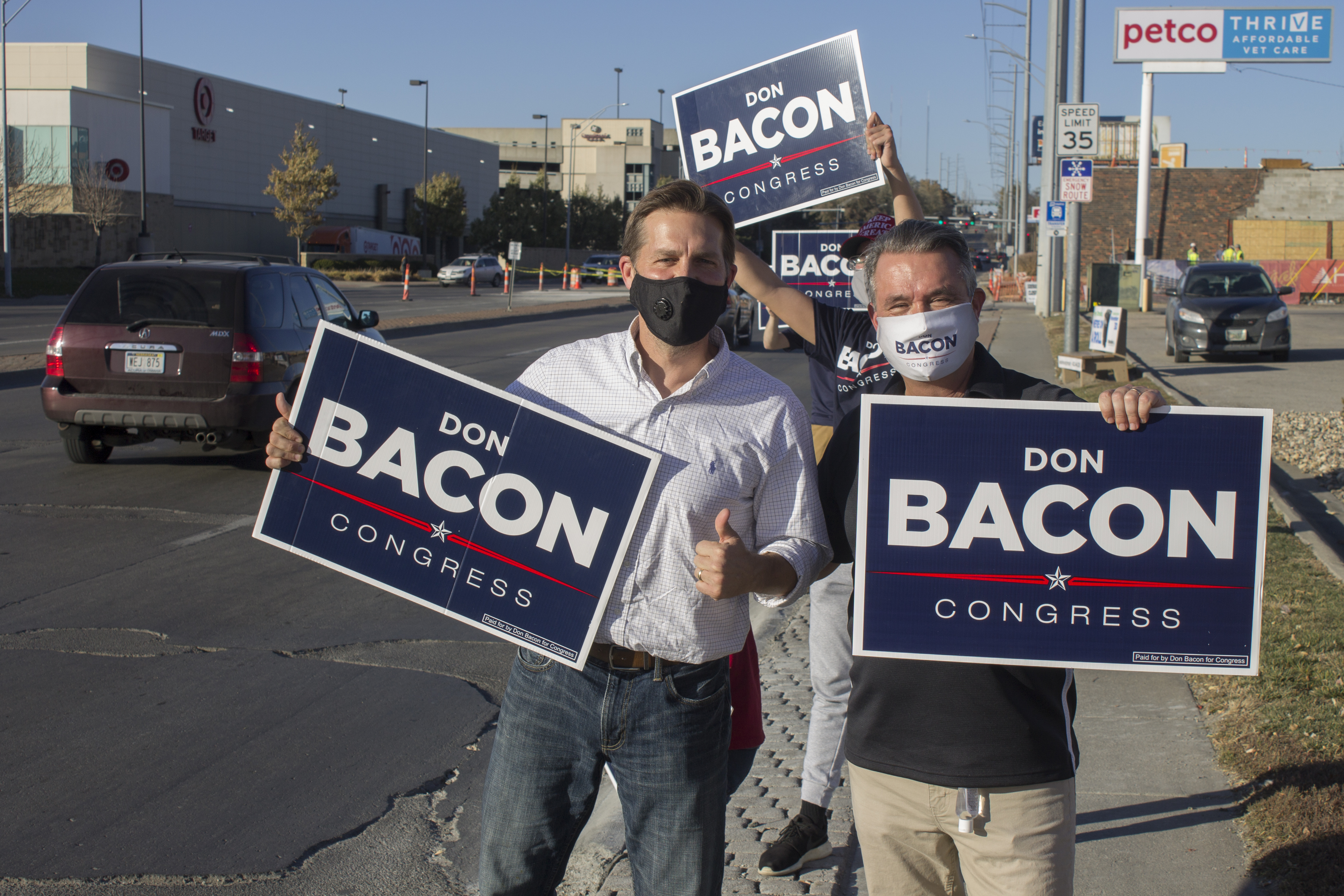
Bacon (right) campaigning with then-Senator Ben Sasse on Election Day 2020

Bacon and Eastman faced off again in the 2020 general election. Bacon was reelected by a larger margin than in 2018, winning 51.0% of the vote to Eastman's 46.2%, even as Democratic presidential nominee Joe Biden won the district by 6.5 points. He was endorsed by his predecessor, Democrat Brad Ashford, whom he defeated in 2016.

==== 2022 ====
Bacon sought re-election in 2022. He won the Republican primary 77.14%–22.86% against challenger Steve Kuehl, and went on to defeat Democratic candidate and state Senator Tony Vargas in the general election by 51.3% to 48.7%.

==== 2024 ====
Bacon sought re-election in 2024. He was challenged by conservative populist Dan Frei for the Republican nomination, who was backed by the Nebraska Republican Party. Bacon won the primary 61.96%–38.04%.

In the general election, Bacon faced Democrat Tony Vargas in a rematch of 2022 by 50.93% to 49.07% as the district also supported Kamala Harris for President.

=== Tenure ===
Bacon was sworn in to the 115th Congress in January 2017. During Donald Trump's first term as president, Bacon voted in line with Trump's position 89.4% of the time.

Bacon was reelected in 2018, 2020, 2022, and 2024. During the first year of Joe Biden's presidency, Bacon voted in line with Biden's position 29.5% of the time.

Following the 2022 midterm elections and announcements by Freedom Caucus members that they would oppose or demand concessions of presumptive House speaker Kevin McCarthy, Bacon announced he was willing to work with Democrats to elect a moderate Republican.

In August 2023, the FBI revealed that Bacon was the first US lawmaker to be targeted in a cyberespionage intrusion by Chinese government hackers. When asked about the intrusion, which Bacon said largely compromised campaign and personal email data, a spokesperson for the Chinese Embassy in Washington, D.C. called the incident a "smear" and part of a "groundless narrative." The embassy denial included a complaint that the U.S. government had undercut China's sovereignty with recent arms sales to Taiwan, an effort which Bacon had vocally supported. A spokeswoman for Bacon's office said it was likely a reason for the attack.

Following failed House votes on bills to avoid a government shutdown beginning on October 1, 2023, Bacon said of Republicans in the Freedom Caucus who sought major concessions or pushed for a shutdown "some of these folks would vote against the Bible because there's not enough Jesus in it."

Bacon voted against the October 2023 removal of Kevin McCarthy as Speaker of the House, calling it a vote "for chaos", and "a good day for Russia and China". He supported Steve Scalise in his initial bid for the October 2023 House Speaker election, but voted against the subsequent unsuccessful bid by Freedom Caucus founder Jim Jordan, Trump's preferred candidate. Following the first round of voting on Jordan's nomination, Bacon revealed that his wife and staff were being harassed and threatened by phone and in public to push him to support Jordan, saying "there's been a bullying campaign...they're being told on certain cable channels that the world's falling apart...and they feel like approved to cross these boundaries and to be wrong." He ultimately supported Mike Johnson's successful bid for the role.

In the 117th United States Congress, Bacon was ranked the most effective Republican lawmaker (and fourth most effective as a whole) by the Center for Effective Lawmaking.

==== 119th Congress ====
Bacon was seated in the 119th United States Congress in January 2025, just before the start of the second Trump administration.

Since Trump's return to office, Bacon has been one of the most vocal Republican critics of the administration's aggressive moves to reshape the U.S. government and America's role in the world. He has consistently rebuked Trump's handling of the War in Ukraine, saying, "he's been very weak... he's been a bit of an appeaser to Russia." He criticized cuts made by DOGE, such as the elimination of AmeriCorps, as "haphazardly eliminating every program a software engineer fails to appreciate." He pushed back against efforts to cut Medicaid, telling the White House that he would not accept more than $500 billion in cuts. Bacon joined a coalition that avoided a government shutdown by passing a continuing resolution, angering Trump allies that preferred to force budget cuts through a shutdown. Bacon called for the firing of Secretary of Defense Pete Hegseth, whom he called "an amateur", following reports of Hegseth's repeated unauthorized use of Signal to discuss military plans. He later criticized Trump's decision to fire National Security Advisor Mike Waltz and Timothy D. Haugh, director of the National Security Agency and U.S. Cyber Command, after Trump fired them and others on the advice of conspiracy theorist Laura Loomer. Following President Trump's Liberation Day tariffs package which implemented severe import duties against nearly every country in the world, Bacon introduced a bill to curtail presidential tariff powers and warned of a recession. Trump responded that he would veto the bill. Bacon was the lone Republican "nay" vote on the bill to codify President Trump's executive order renaming the Gulf of Mexico in U.S. federal documents to the "Gulf of America."

=== Committee assignments ===
For the 119th Congress:

- Committee on Agriculture
  - Subcommittee on Conservation, Research, and Biotechnology
  - Subcommittee on Livestock, Dairy, and Poultry
- Committee on Armed Services
  - Subcommittee on Cyber, Information Technologies, and Innovation (Chairman)
  - Subcommittee on Strategic Forces

=== Caucus memberships ===
- Autism Caucus
- Baltic Caucus, co-chair
- Caucus on Hellenic Issues
- Caucus on U.S.-Turkey Relations
- Congressional Taiwan Caucus
- Civility and Respect Caucus
- Climate Solutions Caucus
- Law Enforcement Caucus
- Motorcycle Caucus
- Congressional Coalition on Adoption
- Problem Solvers Caucus
- Republican Study Committee
- Soccer Caucus, co-chair
- Rare Disease Caucus
- Uzbekistan Caucus
- Western Caucus
- Congressional Caucus on Foster Youth (co-chair)
- Congressional FFA Caucus
- National Service Congressional Caucus

== Political positions ==
Bacon has been frequently described as a moderate centrist within the Republican Party. Bacon was ranked 8th in bipartisanship among members of the House in the year 2023 by the Lugar Center.

=== Foreign policy ===
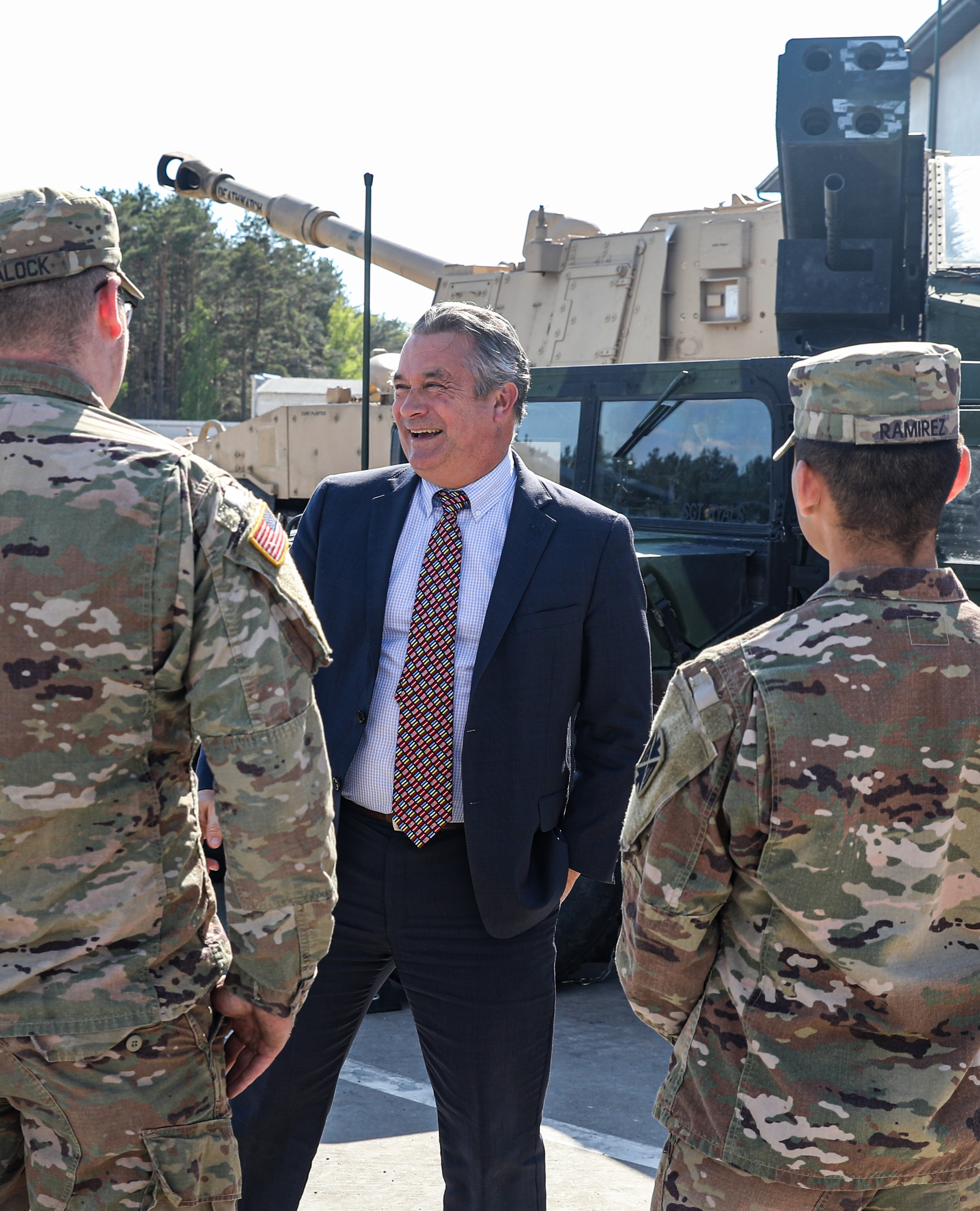
Bacon at NATO facilities in Ādaži, Latvia with U.S. Army M109 howitzer and AN/TWQ-1 Avenger artillery crews

Bacon has been a member of the Armed Services Committee since taking office in 2017. He is known to be hawkish in his foreign policy.

Bacon supported airstrikes in Syria in retaliation for the Assad government's use of chemical weapons. In 2019, Bacon voted for a resolution opposing Trump's move to withdraw U.S. support for the Kurds in Syria, which exposed Kurdish militias to attacks from Turkey.

At a Brookings Institution event in October 2017, Bacon stressed the importance of military readiness and called for U.S. Air Force crews to increase flight hours to enhance readiness. He also said the "gravest threat" to military readiness was the "partisan divide" in government, which had prevented necessary increases in spending.

Bacon supports a stronger U.S. presence in the Balkans to counter Russia, which he has called a key adversary of the United States. He has expressed alarm regarding Russia's activity in Ukraine and the Balkans, as well as Russian interference in the 2016 United States elections and attempted Russian interference in other nations' elections.

In November 2017, Bacon told an electronic warfare (EW) conference that the U.S. military needed "to elevate the electromagnetic spectrum to an official domain of warfare—alongside land, sea, air, space, and cyberspace–and appoint general officers as EW advocates in all four services and to the joint staff." He said the U.S. should re-intensify its EW capabilities, which he said had atrophied after the collapse of the Soviet Union.

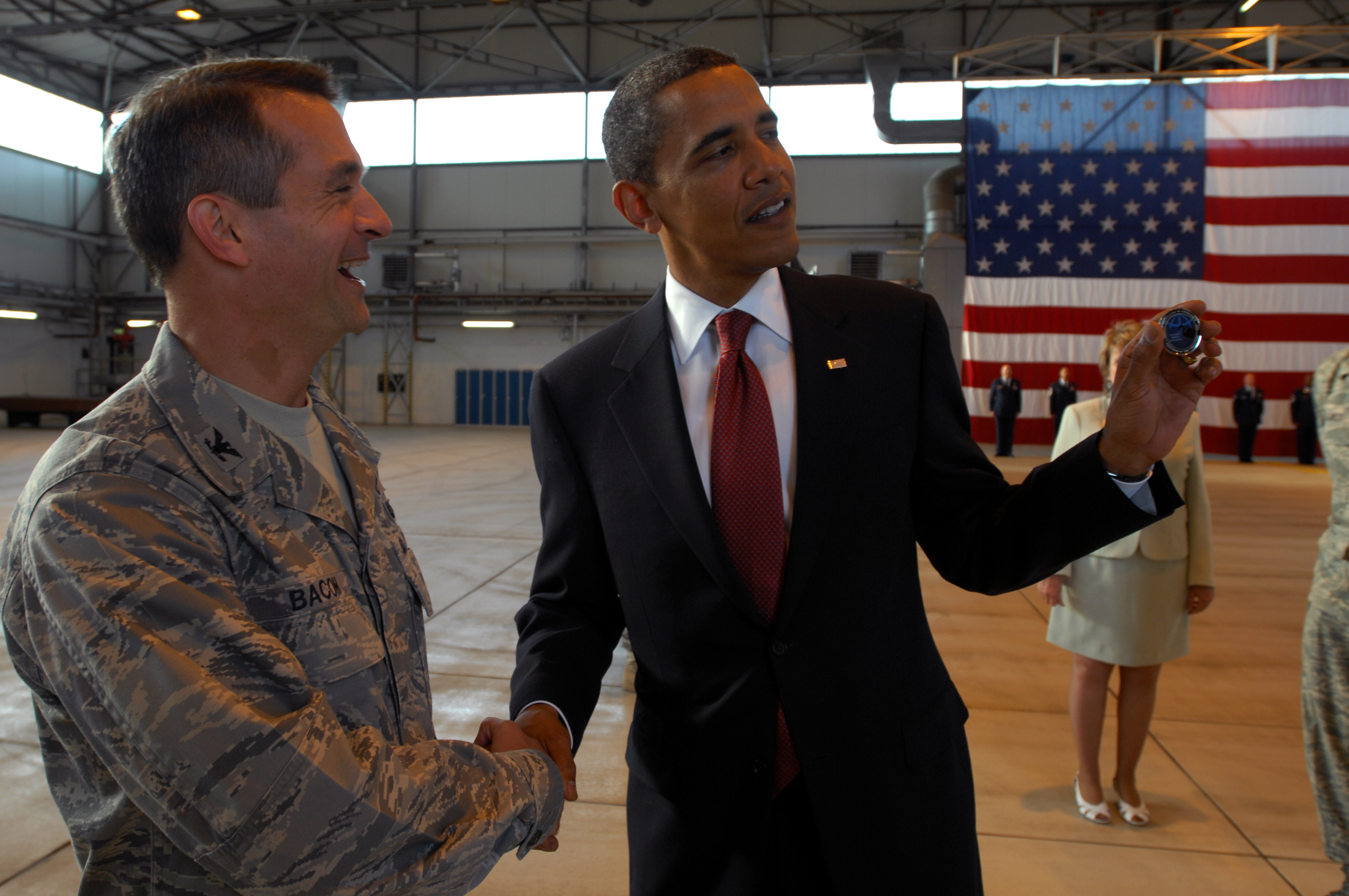
Bacon with President Barack Obama in 2009

Bacon is a consistent supporter of Taiwan. In 2019, he spent time with Representative Salud Carbajal and former speaker Paul Ryan in Taiwan to commemorate the 40th anniversary of the Taiwan Relations Act and open a new de facto Embassy. Bacon said, "we owe it to be clear that Taiwan is a success story and we have to support their democracy." At the outset of Russia's invasion of Ukraine, Bacon said:

"Today starts a new and dark chapter in national security that is Hobbesian in nature where bullies will dominate weaker countries. Where might makes right, and dictators prey on their neighbors unless free nations band together and deter this threat.…We have entered a new cold war"

In April 2022, the Russian Federation sanctioned and banned Bacon in retaliation for U.S. participation in sanctions against pro-war members of the Russian Duma.

In February 2023, Bacon signed a letter advocating for President Joe Biden to give F-16 fighter jets to Ukraine.

Following the highly contentious White House meeting between President Trump and Volodymyr Zelenskyy in February 2025, Bacon described the summit as "a bad day for America's foreign policy." In an interview with CNN, he described Trump's stance on Russia as "too conciliatory" and amounting to "walking away" from America's legacy as the leader of the free world. Bacon contrasted his foreign policy worldview with that of the Trump administration, saying:

"I'm not interested in a foreign policy that is totally built on realism, or transactionalism, where it's just, 'What do we have in it for us?' I believe in having a foreign policy where it's a mix of realism, protecting our country, and idealism."

On 60 Minutes, Bacon described Trump's approach as "appeasement", expressing concern that the post-Cold War order of unipolar U.S. hegemony "is going to collapse."

In March 2025, Bacon said the Trump administration needed "more discipline" after advisor Elon Musk called Senator Mark Kelly a "traitor" for visiting Ukraine and instructed Polish Foreign Minister Radoslaw Sikorski to "be quiet, small man." Bacon told CNN: "It's not appropriate. It's not right."

Following Chinese cyber espionage against U.S. critical telecommunications infrastructure and Treasury Department networks by groups like Salt Typhoon, Bacon told Politico his message to China was: "We're gonna be in your networks, causing mischief, and two could play this game"..."We're going back in [their networks]. Speak softly, but carry a big ass stick and let China know that, 'Hey, you're not gonna get by with just doing the shit you're doing".

After Trump said in October 2026 that Ukraine needed a new president,, Bacon replied to one X user who supported Zelenskyy's removal by saying that Vladimir Putin "needs to be hung" [sic].

=== Agriculture ===
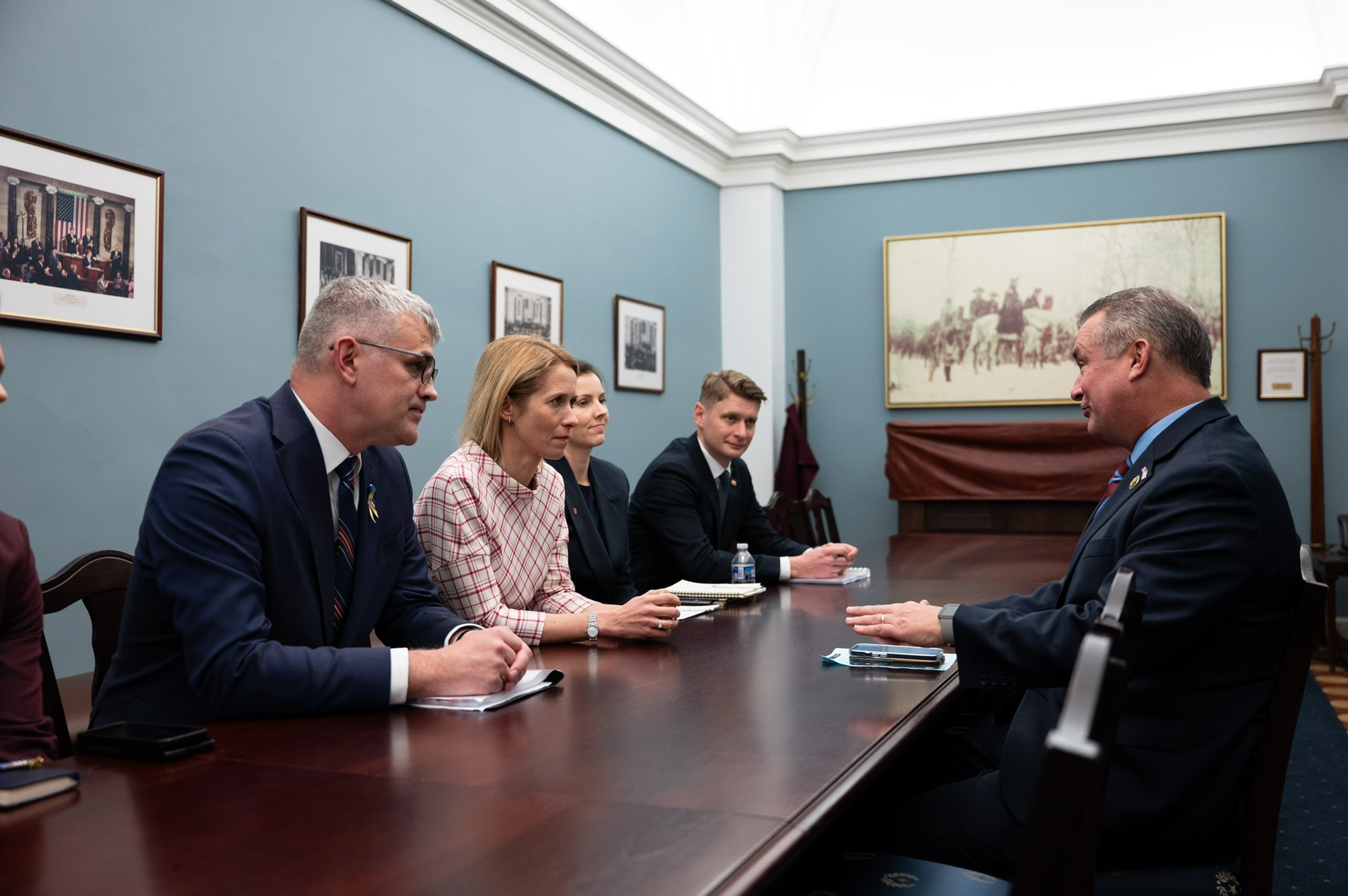
Bacon meeting Kaja Kallas in November 2023

Bacon has been a member of the House Agriculture Committee since 2017. In 2019, he urged the United States Army Corps of Engineers to streamline its response to the 2019 Midwestern U.S. floods and pushed to fund levies to shore up flooded farmland and Offutt Air Force Base.

=== Abortion ===
Bacon opposes abortion. In 2017, he voted for legislation to ban abortion after 20 weeks of pregnancy and to repeal a rule requiring state and local governments to distribute federal funds to Federally Qualified Health Centers even if they perform abortions, a measure aimed at defunding Planned Parenthood. Bacon said he supported redirecting funds to community health care centers that do not provide abortion services.

In 2024, Bacon said he supported a federal ban on abortion after 15 weeks with exceptions for the life of the mother. Bacon opposed the 2024 Nebraska Right to Abortion Initiative that would have amended the state's constitution to establish a right to abortion until fetal viability but supported the opposing ballot measure (Protect Women and Children) which would criminalize most abortions after the first trimester and may allow lawmakers to restrict or ban abortion in the future.

=== Antisemitism ===
In the 119th Congress, Bacon became co-chair of the new House Anti-Semitism Task Force. He called the Trump administration appointment of Kingsley Wilson as deputy spokesperson for the Department of Defense "unacceptable" after her use of social media to espouse antisemitic, white nationalist, and neo-Nazi rhetoric and conspiracies about the lynching of Leo Frank came to light.

=== Civil rights ===
In 2019, Bacon and Representative Seth Moulton introduced the Justice for Victims of Lynching Act of 2019. The bill specified lynching as a unique deprivation of civil rights, and would for the first time make it a federal crime. The bill's language was incorporated into the 2020 Emmett Till Antilynching Act, which passed the House but was blocked by Rand Paul in the Senate. A later version became law in 2022.

Bacon expressed support for "most of" the George Floyd Justice in Policing Act of 2020. He supported mandatory wearing of body cameras by police officers while on duty and a national registry for police misconduct, but opposed ending qualified immunity provisions for officers. He also criticized provisions ending the Department of Defense 1033 program, which allows the transfer of surplus military equipment to law enforcement agencies, saying, "if our police are encountering a serious threat, I don't want an equal fight for them." He ultimately voted against the legislation in a mostly party-line vote.

==== The Naming Commission ====
After the murder of George Floyd, Bacon and Anthony Brown introduced legislation to rename Department of Defense assets that valorized Southern confederate leaders or values. Alongside companion legislation introduced in the Senate by Elizabeth Warren, the bill resulted in the creation of the Naming Commission through incorporation into the omnibus National Defense Authorization Act. When asked about the bill, President Trump insisted that he would "not even consider" the proposal, to which Bacon replied in The New York Times, "you're wrong—you need to change... we're not the party of Jim Crow." Trump vetoed the NDAA for reasons he said included funding for the commission, after which Congress delivered the only veto override of his presidency.

=== Drug policy ===
In 2018, Bacon said that he opposed marijuana legalization as a personal matter, but that he supported decriminalization at the federal level and believed that states should be permitted to make the decision. Bacon supported the 2018 Farm Bill, which legalized industrial hemp production. Bacon voted against the 2022 MORE Act, which would have removed cannabis from Schedule I of the Controlled Substances Act.

=== Economic issues ===
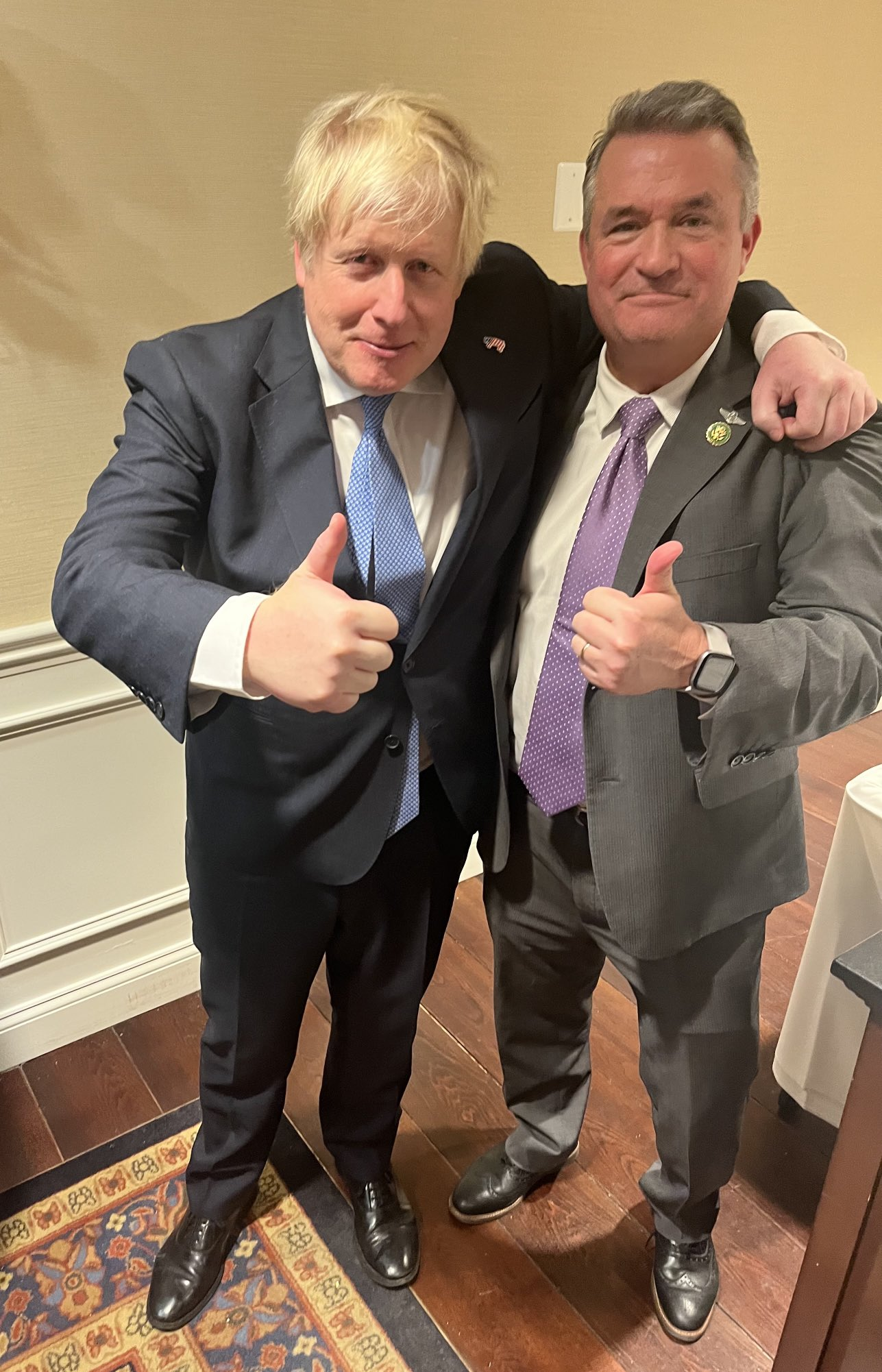
Bacon with former UK Prime Minister Boris Johnson in 2023

In 2017, Bacon voted for the Tax Cuts and Jobs Act of 2017. Bacon has expressed support for raising the full retirement age for eligibility for Social Security for Americans now under age 40.

=== Environment ===
Bacon has said, "I don't think we know for certain how much of climate change is being caused by normal cyclical changes in weather vs. human causes. I support legislation that allows for continued incremental improvement in our environment but oppose extreme measures that create significant economic and job disruption."

=== Gun policy ===
In 2018, Bacon said he would support a ban on bump stocks. In 2021, he introduced legislation to enhance penalties for engaging in illicit straw purchases of firearms.

=== Health care ===
Bacon favors repealing the Affordable Care Act (ACA), commonly known as Obamacare, and opposes proposals for Medicare for All or single-payer healthcare. In May 2017, he voted for the American Health Care Act of 2017, Republican health-care legislation that would have repealed large portions of the ACA.

=== Immigration ===
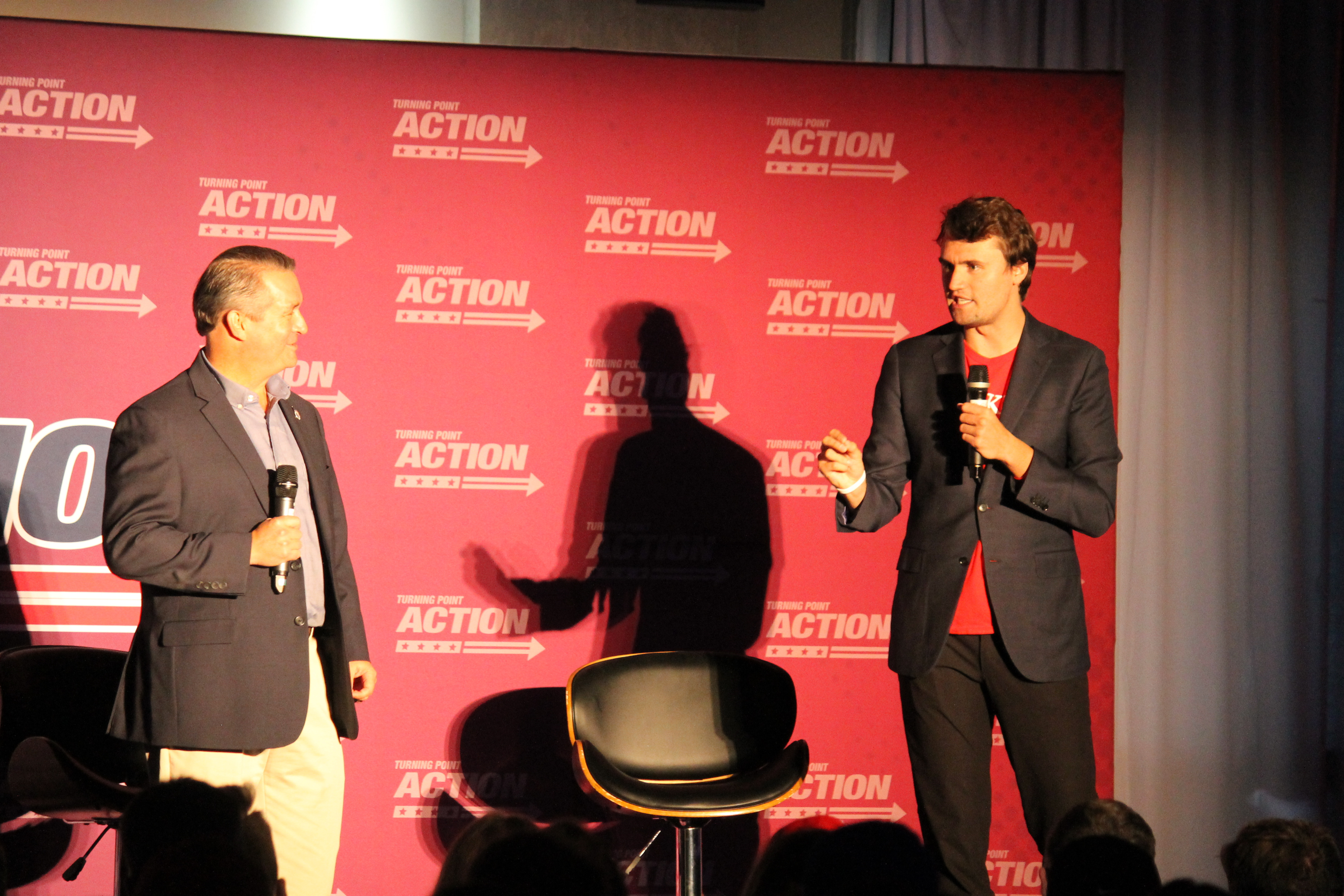
Bacon campaigns with Charlie Kirk at a pro-Trump event in Omaha in 2020.

In August 2017, Bacon and five of his House colleagues urged Trump to preserve the Deferred Action for Childhood Arrivals program for undocumented youth brought to the United States as children (also known as "Dreamers"), "until we can pass a permanent legislative solution." In 2019, he voted for legislation to create a pathway to citizenship for undocumented youth.

Bacon has expressed support for construction of the U.S.-Mexico border wall supported by Trump. Bacon voted against legislation to end the December 2018–January 2019 government shutdown by appropriating funds without money for a border wall. He said that Trump's attempt to circumvent Congress by declaring a national emergency to redirect money from military construction to building a border wall was not "the right way to go" because it infringed on congressional powers, but voted against a House resolution to overturn the emergency declaration and against overriding Trump's veto of legislation that would have overturned the declaration.

In 2017, Bacon reintroduced the Kerrie Orozco Act, which would "allow the spouses of first responders, killed in the line of duty, access to a quicker process of becoming an American citizen."

In 2025, Bacon cosponsored the American Families United Act.

In 2026, Bacon cosponsored the DIGNIDAD Act, which proposes a pathway to legal status for up to 12 million illegal immigrants, paired with stricter border enforcement and mandatory work and restitution requirements.

In April 2026, Bacon was one of six Republicans who joined all Democrats in voting to grant Temporary Protected Status to approximately 350,000 Haitian immigrants, despite efforts by Donald Trump to terminate the program.

=== Impeachment ===
In 2019, the House voted on two articles of impeachment against Donald Trump. Bacon voted against both articles.

In 2021, the House voted on one article of impeachment against Trump for incitement of insurrection after the January 6 attack on the U.S. Capitol. Bacon voted against the article.

In 2023, Bacon voted for the impeachment inquiry into Joe Biden, but said he was skeptical of the efforts to impeach, stating that he thinks Biden did engage in corruption, but that impeachments are bad for the nation and generally hurt the election successes of the party bringing the proceedings.

=== Infrastructure ===
Bacon initially said he would support President Biden's Infrastructure Investment and Jobs Act, and criticized Republicans for opposing it, but during negotiations he said he could not commit to voting for the bill. Ultimately, Bacon was one of 13 House Republicans to break with their party and vote with a majority of Democrats in favor of the legislation.

=== Israel ===
Bacon supports an "ironclad partnership" with Israel and endorsed the recognition of Jerusalem as the capital of Israel. Bacon voted to provide Israel with support following the 2023 Hamas attack on Israel.

=== 2020 and 2024 presidential elections ===
In a December 2020 Washington Post survey of the 249 Republican members of Congress, Bacon was one of 37 who acknowledged Joe Biden as the legitimate President-elect.

Bacon did not join congressional Republicans who sided with the Trump campaign's attempts to overturn the 2020 United States presidential election. He voted to certify both Arizona's and Pennsylvania's votes in the 2021 United States Electoral College vote count.

On May 19, 2021, Bacon was one of 35 Republicans who joined Democrats in voting to approve legislation to establish the January 6 commission meant to investigate the January 6 United States Capitol attack. Before the vote, he was one of only a few Republican lawmakers who openly expressed their support for the commission.

On September 13, 2024, Bacon and Representative Josh Gottheimer released a bipartisan letter spearheaded by centrist House representatives in which they pledged to respect the results of the 2024 presidential election. Five other Republicans signed the letter alongside Bacon.

On September 18, 2024, the entire Nebraska delegation, including Bacon, signed a letter to Governor Pillen supporting changing Nebraska's presidential election system to a winner-takes-all method, effectively eliminating the allocation of electoral votes by congressional district.

== Electoral history ==
	Republican candidate			Democratic candidate			Other candidate			
Year	Candidate	Votes		Candidate	Votes		Candidate	Party	Votes	
2016	Don Bacon	141,066	48.9%	Brad Ashford (Incumbent)	137,602	47.7%	Steven Laird	Libertarian	9,640	3.4%
2018	Don Bacon (Incumbent)	126,715	51.0%	Kara Eastman	121,770	49.0%				
2020	Don Bacon (Incumbent)	171,071	50.8%	Kara Eastman	155,706	46.2%	Tyler Schaeffer	Libertarian	10,185	3.0%
2022	Don Bacon (Incumbent)	112,663	51.3%	Tony Vargas	106,807	48.7%				
2024	Don Bacon (Incumbent)	160,198	50.9%	Tony Vargas	154,369	49.1%				

== Personal life ==
Bacon and his wife Angie (née Hardison) have four children and eight grandchildren. They live in Papillion, Nebraska. Bacon is a Protestant.

When Bacon chose not to run for re-election in 2026, one of the reasons he gave was so he could spend more time with his grandchildren.

== Awards and decorations ==
=== Military ===
Bacon's military awards and decorations include:

Badge	Master Navigator Badge		
Badge	Senior Intelligence Badge		
1st row	Legion of Merit with oak leaf cluster		Bronze Star with oak leaf cluster
2nd row	Meritorious Service Medal with four oak leaf clusters	Aerial Achievement Medal	Air Force Commendation Medal with two oak leaf clusters
3rd row	Air Force Achievement Medal with oak leaf cluster	Joint Meritorious Unit Citation	Meritorious Unit Award
4th row	Air Force Outstanding Unit Award	Combat Readiness Medal	National Defense Service Medal
5th row	Armed Forces Expeditionary Medal	Iraq Campaign Medal	Global War on Terrorism Expeditionary Medal
6th row	Global War on Terrorism Service Medal	Air Force Overseas Ribbon - Short Tour	Air Force Overseas Ribbon - Long Tour
7th row	Air Force Longevity Service Award	Small Arms Expert Marksmanship Ribbon	Air Force Training Ribbon

=== Foreign awards ===
- Estonia
  - Order of the Cross of Terra Mariana (2024) – the highest award given to foreigners by the government of Estonia.
- Lithuania
  - Order for Merits to Lithuania (2024) – Given by Lithuanian president Gitanas Nausėda.
- Ukraine
  - Honorary Diploma of the Verkhovna Rada of Ukraine (2024) – Awarded by Ukrainian Parliament; presented by Ruslan Stefanchuk, Chairman of the Verkhovna Rada.

U.S. House of Representatives
Preceded by Brad Ashford	Member of the U.S. House of Representatives from Nebraska's 2nd congressional district 2017–present	Incumbent
Party political offices
Preceded by Rodney Davis	Chair of the Republican Main Street Caucus; 2021–2023; Served alongside: Mike Bost, Pete Stauber	Succeeded by Dusty Johnson
U.S. order of precedence (ceremonial)
Preceded by Jodey Arrington	United States representatives by seniority 156th	Succeeded by Nanette Barragán
