= List of United States House of Representatives committees =

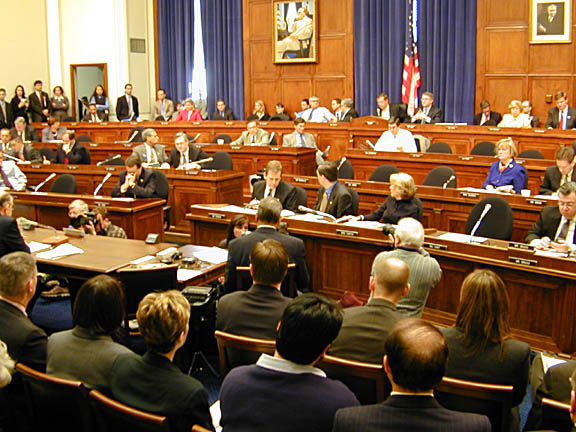
Members of the Committee on Financial Services sit in the tiers of raised chairs (R), while those testifying and audience members sit below (L).

There are two main types of congressional committees in the United States House of Representatives, standing committees and select committees. Committee chairs are selected by whichever party is in the majority, and the minority party selects ranking members to lead them. The committees and party conferences may have rules determining term limits for leadership and membership, though waivers can be issued. While the Democrats and Republicans differ on the exact processes by which committee leadership and assignments are chosen, most standing committees are selected by the respective party steering committees and ratified by the party conferences. The Ethics, House Administration, Rules and all select committees are chosen by the party leaders (Speaker in the majority and Minority Leader in the minority). Most committees are additionally subdivided into subcommittees, each with its own leadership selected according to the full committee's rules. The only standing committee with no subcommittees is the Budget Committee.

The modern House committees were brought into existence through the Legislative Reorganization Act of 1946. This bill reduced the number of House committees, as well as restructured the committees' jurisdictions.

== Standing committees ==
Committee	Chair	Ranking Member	Refs
Subcommittee	Chair	Ranking Member	Refs
Agriculture	Glenn Thompson (R-PA)	Angie Craig (D-MN)	
Commodity Markets, Digital Assets and Rural Development	Dusty Johnson (R-SD)	Don Davis (D-NC)	
Conservation, Research and Biotechnology	Frank Lucas (R-OK)	Jill Tokuda (D-HI)	
Forestry and Horticulture	Dan Newhouse (R-WA)	Andrea Salinas (D-OR)	
General Farm Commodities, Risk Management and Credit	Austin Scott (R-GA)	Sharice Davids (D-KS)	
Livestock, Dairy and Poultry	Tracey Mann (R-KS)	Jim Costa (D-CA)	
Nutrition and Foreign Agriculture	Brad Finstad (R-MN)	Jahana Hayes (D-CT)	
Appropriations	Tom Cole (R-OK)	Rosa DeLauro (D-CT)	
Agriculture, Rural Development, Food and Drug Administration and Related Agencies	Andy Harris (R-MD)	Sanford Bishop (D-GA)	
Commerce, Justice, Science and Related Agencies	Hal Rogers (R-KY)	Grace Meng (D-NY)	
Defense	Ken Calvert (R-CA)	Betty McCollum (D-MN)	
Energy and Water Development and Related Agencies	Chuck Fleischmann (R-TN)	Marcy Kaptur (D-OH)	
Financial Services and General Government	Dave Joyce (R-OH)	Steny Hoyer (D-MD)	
Homeland Security	Mark Amodei (R-NV)	Henry Cuellar (D-TX)	
Interior, Environment and Related Agencies	Mike Simpson (R-ID)	Chellie Pingree (D-ME)	
Labor, Health and Human Services, Education and Related Agencies	Robert Aderholt (R-AL)	Rosa DeLauro (D-CT)	
Legislative Branch	David Valadao (R-CA)	Adriano Espaillat (D-NY)	
Military Construction, Veterans Affairs and Related Agencies	John Carter (R-TX)	Debbie Wasserman Schultz (D-FL)	
National Security, Department of State and Related Programs	Mario Díaz-Balart (R-FL)	Lois Frankel (D-FL)	
Transportation, Housing and Urban Development and Related Agencies	Steve Womack (R-AR)	Jim Clyburn (D-SC)	
Armed Services	Mike Rogers (R-AL)	Adam Smith (D-WA)	
Cyber, Information Technologies and Innovation	Don Bacon (R-NE)	Ro Khanna (D-CA)	
Intelligence and Special Operations	Ronny Jackson (R-TX)	Jason Crow (D-CO)	
Military Personnel	Pat Fallon (R-TX)	Chrissy Houlahan (D-PA)	
Readiness	Jack Bergman (R-MI)	John Garamendi (D-CA)	
Seapower and Projection Forces	Trent Kelly (R-MS)	Joe Courtney (D-CT)	
Strategic Forces	Scott DesJarlais (R-TN)	Seth Moulton (D-MA)	
Tactical Air and Land Forces	Rob Wittman (R-VA)	Donald Norcross (D-NJ)	
Budget	Jodey Arrington (R-TX)	Brendan Boyle (D-PA)	
Education and Workforce	Tim Walberg (R-MI)	Bobby Scott (D-VA)	
Early Childhood, Elementary and Secondary Education	Kevin Kiley (I-CA)	Suzanne Bonamici (D-OR)	
Health, Employment, Labor and Pensions	Rick Allen (R-GA)	Mark DeSaulnier (D-CA)	
Higher Education and Workforce Development	Burgess Owens (R-UT)	Alma Adams (D-NC)	
Workforce Protections	Ryan Mackenzie (R-PA)	Ilhan Omar (D-MN)	
Energy and Commerce	Brett Guthrie (R-KY)	Frank Pallone (D-NJ)	
Commerce, Manufacturing and Trade	Gus Bilirakis (R-FL)	Jan Schakowsky (D-IL)	
Communications and Technology	Rich Hudson (R-NC)	Doris Matsui (D-CA)	
Energy	Bob Latta (R-OH)	Kathy Castor (D-FL)	
Environment	Gary Palmer (R-AL)	Paul Tonko (D-NY)	
Health	Morgan Griffith (R-VA)	Diana DeGette (D-CO)	
Oversight and Investigations	John Joyce (R-PA)	Yvette Clarke (D-NY)	
Ethics	Michael Guest (R-MS)	Mark DeSaulnier (D-CA)	
Campaign Activity (Working Group)	Nathaniel Moran (R-TX)	Sylvia Garcia (D-TX)	
Cuellar Investigation	Ben Cline (R-VA)	Glenn Ivey (D-MD)	
Mills Investigation	Andrew Garbarino (R-NY)	Suhas Subramanyam (D-VA)	
Financial Services	French Hill (R-AR)	Maxine Waters (D-CA)	
Capital Markets	Ann Wagner (R-MO)	Brad Sherman (D-CA)	
Digital Assets, Financial Technology and Artificial Intelligence	Bryan Steil (R-WI)	Steve Lynch (D-MA)	
Financial Institutions	Andy Barr (R-KY)	Bill Foster (D-IL)	
Housing and Insurance	Mike Flood (R-NE)	Emanuel Cleaver (D-MO)	
Monetary Policy, Treasury Market Resilience and Economic Prosperity (Task Force)	Frank Lucas (R-OK)	Juan Vargas (D-CA)	
National Security, Illicit Finance and International Financial Institutions	Warren Davidson (R-OH)	Joyce Beatty (D-OH)	
Oversight and Investigations	Dan Meuser (R-PA)	Al Green (D-TX)	
Foreign Affairs	Brian Mast (R-FL)	Gregory Meeks (D-NY)	
Africa	Chris Smith (R-NJ)	Sara Jacobs (D-CA)	
East Asia and the Pacific	Young Kim (R-CA)	Ami Bera (D-CA)	
Europe	Keith Self (R-TX)	Bill Keating (D-MA)	
Middle East and North Africa	Mike Lawler (R-NY)	Jared Moskowitz (D-FL)	
Oversight and Intelligence	Cory Mills (R-FL)	Jonathan Jackson (D-IL)	
South and Central Asia	Bill Huizenga (R-MI)	Sydney Kamlager-Dove (D-CA)	
Western Hemisphere	María Elvira Salazar (R-FL)	Joaquin Castro (D-TX)	
Homeland Security	Andrew Garbarino (R-NY)	Bennie Thompson (D-MS)	
Border Security and Enforcement	Michael Guest (R-MS)	Lou Correa (D-CA)	
Counterterrorism and Intelligence	August Pfluger (R-TX)	Seth Magaziner (D-RI)	
Cybersecurity and Infrastructure Protection	Andy Ogles (R-TN)	Delia Ramirez (D-IL)	
Emergency Management and Technology	Dale Strong (R-AL)	Tim Kennedy (D-NY)	
Enhancing Security for Special Events in the United States (Task Force)	Mike McCaul (R-TX)	Nellie Pou (D-NJ)	
Oversight, Investigations and Accountability	Josh Brecheen (R-OK)	Shri Thanedar (D-MI)	
Transportation and Maritime Security	Carlos Giménez (R-FL)	LaMonica McIver (D-NJ)	
House Administration	Bryan Steil (R-WI)	Joe Morelle (D-NY)	
Communications Standards Commission (Franking Commission)	Mike Carey (R-OH)	Joe Morelle (D-NY)	
Elections	Laurel Lee (R-FL)	Terri Sewell (D-AL)	
Modernization and Innovation	Stephanie Bice (R-OK)	Norma Torres (D-CA)	
Judiciary	Jim Jordan (R-OH)	Jamie Raskin (D-MD)	
Administrative State, Regulatory Reform and Antitrust	Scott Fitzgerald (R-WI)	Jerry Nadler (D-NY)	
Constitution and Limited Government	Chip Roy (R-TX)	Mary Gay Scanlon (D-PA)	
Courts, Intellectual Property, Artificial Intelligence and the Internet	Darrell Issa (R-CA)	Hank Johnson (D-GA)	
Crime and Federal Government Surveillance	Andy Biggs (R-AZ)	Lucy McBath (D-GA)	
Immigration Integrity, Security and Enforcement	Tom McClintock (R-CA)	Pramila Jayapal (D-WA)	
Investigate the Remaining Questions Surrounding January 6, 2021 (Select)	Barry Loudermilk (R-GA)	Vacant	
Oversight	Jeff Van Drew (R-NJ)	Jasmine Crockett (D-TX)	
Natural Resources	Bruce Westerman (R-AR)	Jared Huffman (D-CA)	
Energy and Mineral Resources	Pete Stauber (R-MN)	Yassamin Ansari (D-AZ)	
Federal Lands	Tom Tiffany (R-WI)	Joe Neguse (D-CO)	
Indian and Insular Affairs	Jeff Hurd (R-CO)	Teresa Leger Fernández (D-NM)	
Oversight and Investigations	Paul Gosar (R-AZ)	Maxine Dexter (D-OR)	
Water, Wildlife and Fisheries	Harriet Hageman (R-WY)	Val Hoyle (D-OR)	
Oversight and Government Reform	James Comer (R-KY)	Robert Garcia (D-CA)	
Cybersecurity, Information Technology and Government Innovation	Nancy Mace (R-SC)	Shontel Brown (D-OH)	
Declassification of Federal Secrets (Task Force)	Anna Paulina Luna (R-FL)	Jasmine Crockett (D-TX)	
Defending Constitutional Rights and Exposing Institutional Abuses (Task Force)	Brandon Gill (R-TX)	Lateefah Simon (D-CA)	
Delivering on Government Efficiency	Tim Burchett (R-TN)	Melanie Stansbury (D-NM)	
Economic Growth, Energy Policy and Regulatory Affairs	Eric Burlison (R-MO)	Maxwell Frost (D-FL)	
Federal Law Enforcement	Clay Higgins (R-LA)	Summer Lee (D-PA)	
Government Operations	Pete Sessions (R-TX)	Kweisi Mfume (D-MD)	
Health Care and Financial Services	Glenn Grothman (R-WI)	Raja Krishnamoorthi (D-IL)	
Military and Foreign Affairs	William Timmons (R-SC)	Suhas Subramanyam (D-VA)	
Rules	Virginia Foxx (R-NC)	Jim McGovern (D-MA)	
Legislative and Budget Process	Nick Langworthy (R-NY)	Teresa Leger Fernández (D-NM)	
Rules and Organization of the House	Michelle Fischbach (R-MN)	Mary Gay Scanlon (D-PA)	
Science, Space and Technology	Brian Babin (R-TX)	Zoe Lofgren (D-CA)	
Energy	Randy Weber (R-TX)	Deborah Ross (D-NC)	
Environment	Scott Franklin (R-FL)	Gabe Amo (D-RI)	
Investigations and Oversight	Rich McCormick (R-GA)	Emilia Sykes (D-OH)	
Research and Technology	Jay Obernolte (R-CA)	Haley Stevens (D-MI)	
Space and Aeronautics	Mike Haridopolos (R-FL)	Valerie Foushee (D-NC)	
Small Business	Roger Williams (R-TX)	Nydia Velázquez (D-NY)	
Contracting and Infrastructure	Nick LaLota (R-NY)	Gil Cisneros (D-CA)	
Economic Growth, Tax and Capital Access	Beth Van Duyne (R-TX)	LaMonica McIver (D-NJ)	
Innovation, Entrepreneurship and Workforce Development	Brian Jack (R-GA)	Hillary Scholten (D-MI)	
Oversight, Investigations and Regulations	Mark Alford (R-MO)	Derek Tran (D-CA)	
Rural Development, Energy and Supply Chains	Jake Ellzey (R-TX)	Kelly Morrison (D-MN)	
Transportation and Infrastructure	Sam Graves (R-MO)	Rick Larsen (D-WA)	
Aviation	Troy Nehls (R-TX)	Steve Cohen (D-TN)	
Coast Guard and Maritime Transportation	Mike Ezell (R-MS)	Salud Carbajal (D-CA)	
Economic Development, Public Buildings and Emergency Management	Scott Perry (R-PA)	Greg Stanton (D-AZ)	
Highways and Transit	David Rouzer (R-NC)	Eleanor Holmes Norton (D-DC)	
Railroads, Pipelines and Hazardous Materials	Daniel Webster (R-FL)	Dina Titus (D-NV)	
Water Resources and Environment	Mike Collins (R-GA)	Frederica Wilson (D-FL)	
Veterans' Affairs	Mike Bost (R-IL)	Mark Takano (D-CA)	
Disability Assistance and Memorial Affairs	Morgan Luttrell (R-TX)	Morgan McGarvey (D-KY)	
Economic Opportunity	Derrick Van Orden (R-WI)	Chris Pappas (D-NH)	
Health	Mariannette Miller-Meeks (R-IA)	Julia Brownley (D-CA)	
Oversight and Investigations	Jen Kiggans (R-VA)	Delia Ramirez (D-IL)	
Technology Modernization	Tom Barrett (R-MI)	Nikki Budzinski (D-IL)	
Ways and Means	Jason Smith (R-MO)	Richard Neal (D-MA)	
Health	Vern Buchanan (R-FL)	Lloyd Doggett (D-TX)	
Oversight	David Schweikert (R-AZ)	Terri Sewell (D-AL)	
Social Security	Ron Estes (R-KS)	John Larson (D-CT)	
Tax	Mike Kelly (R-PA)	Mike Thompson (D-CA)	
Trade	Adrian Smith (R-NE)	Linda Sánchez (D-CA)	
Work and Welfare	Darin LaHood (R-IL)	Danny Davis (D-IL)	

== Non-standing committees ==
Committee	Chair	Ranking Member	Refs
Subcommittee	Chair	Ranking Member	Refs
Democracy Partnership (Commission)	Vern Buchanan (R-FL)	Dina Titus (D-NV)	
Intelligence (Permanent Select)	Rick Crawford (R-AR)	Jim Himes (D-CT)	
Cartel (Task Force)	Dan Crenshaw (R-TX)	Jason Crow (D-CO)	
Central Intelligence Agency	Brian Fitzpatrick (R-PA)	Jimmy Gomez (D-CA)	
Defense Intelligence and Overhead Architecture	Dan Crenshaw (R-TX)	Mike Quigley (D-IL)	
National Intelligence Enterprise	Austin Scott (R-GA)	André Carson (D-IN)	
National Security Agency and Cyber	Darin LaHood (R-IL)	Josh Gottheimer (D-NJ)	
Open-Source Intelligence	Ann Wagner (R-MO)	Chrissy Houlahan (D-PA)	
Oversight and Investigations	Ronny Jackson (R-TX)	Joaquin Castro (D-TX)	
Strategic Competition between the United States and the Chinese Communist Party (Select)	John Moolenaar (R-MI)	Ro Khanna (D-CA)	
Tom Lantos Human Rights Commission	Chris Smith (R-NJ)	Jim McGovern (D-MA)	

== Party leadership ==
Each party determines their committees leads, who serve as chair in the majority and ranking member in the minority. The table below lists the tenure of when each member was selected for their current term as committee lead. The Republican party rules stipulate that their leads of standing committees may serve no more than three congressional terms (two years each) as chair or ranking member unless the full party conference grants them a waiver to do so. The current majority party is listed first for each committee.

Committee	Party Lead	State	Start	Party
Agriculture	Glenn Thompson	PA	January 3, 2021	Republican
Agriculture	Angie Craig	MN	January 3, 2025	Democratic
Appropriations	Tom Cole	OK	April 10, 2024	Republican
Appropriations	Rosa DeLauro	CT	January 3, 2021	Democratic
Armed Services	Mike Rogers	AL	January 3, 2021	Republican
Armed Services	Adam Smith	WA	January 3, 2011	Democratic
Democracy Partnership (Commission)	Vern Buchanan	FL	January 3, 2019	Republican
Democracy Partnership (Commission)	Dina Titus	NV	January 3, 2023	Democratic
Budget	Jodey Arrington	TX	January 3, 2023	Republican
Budget	Brendan Boyle	PA	January 3, 2023	Democratic
Education and Workforce	Tim Walberg	MI	January 3, 2025	Republican
Education and Workforce	Bobby Scott	VA	January 3, 2015	Democratic
Energy and Commerce	Brett Guthrie	KY	January 3, 2025	Republican
Energy and Commerce	Frank Pallone	NJ	January 3, 2015	Democratic
Ethics	Michael Guest	MS	August 19, 2022	Republican
Ethics	Mark DeSaulnier	CA	January 3, 2025	Democratic
Financial Services	French Hill	AR	January 3, 2025	Republican
Financial Services	Maxine Waters	CA	January 3, 2013	Democratic
Foreign Affairs	Brian Mast	FL	January 3, 2025	Republican
Foreign Affairs	Gregory Meeks	NY	January 3, 2021	Democratic
Homeland Security	Andrew Garbarino	NY	July 22, 2025	Republican
Homeland Security	Bennie Thompson	MS	January 3, 2005	Democratic
House Administration	Bryan Steil	WI	January 3, 2023	Republican
House Administration	Joe Morelle	NY	January 3, 2023	Democratic
Human Rights (Lantos Commission)	Chris Smith	NJ	January 3, 2019	Republican
Human Rights (Lantos Commission)	Jim McGovern	MA	February 11, 2008	Democratic
Intelligence (Permanent Select)	Rick Crawford	AR	January 3, 2025	Republican
Intelligence (Permanent Select)	Jim Himes	CT	January 3, 2023	Democratic
Judiciary	Jim Jordan	OH	March 12, 2020	Republican
Judiciary	Jamie Raskin	MD	January 3, 2025	Democratic
Natural Resources	Bruce Westerman	AR	January 3, 2021	Republican
Natural Resources	Jared Huffman	CA	January 3, 2025	Democratic
Oversight and Accountability	James Comer	KY	June 29, 2020	Republican
Oversight and Accountability	Robert Garcia	CA	June 24, 2025	Democratic
Rules	Virginia Foxx	NC	January 3, 2025	Republican
Rules	Jim McGovern	MA	March 16, 2018	Democratic
Science, Space and Technology	Brian Babin	TX	January 3, 2025	Republican
Science, Space and Technology	Zoe Lofgren	CA	January 3, 2023	Democratic
Small Business	Roger Williams	TX	January 3, 2023	Republican
Small Business	Nydia Velázquez	NY	February 28, 1998	Democratic
Strategic Competition between the United States and the Chinese Communist Party (Select)	John Moolenaar	MI	April 24, 2024	Republican
Strategic Competition between the United States and the Chinese Communist Party (Select)	Ro Khanna	CA	January 5, 2026	Democratic
Transportation and Infrastructure	Sam Graves	MO	January 3, 2019	Republican
Transportation and Infrastructure	Rick Larsen	WA	January 3, 2023	Democratic
Veterans' Affairs	Mike Bost	IL	January 3, 2021	Republican
Veterans' Affairs	Mark Takano	CA	January 3, 2019	Democratic
Ways and Means	Jason Smith	MO	January 3, 2023	Republican
Ways and Means	Richard Neal	MA	January 3, 2017	Democratic

== See also ==
- List of United States Senate committees
- List of United States congressional joint committees
- List of defunct United States congressional committees
