= United States House Armed Services Subcommittee on Readiness =

Subcommittee of Committee on Armed Services
- Active United States House of Representatives; 119th Congress

Leadership
- Chair: Jack Bergman (R)
- Ranking Member: John Garamendi (D)

Structure
- Seats: 19 (19 currently filled) 10/10 9/9
- Political parties: Majority (10): Republican (10); Minority (9): Democratic (9)

Meeting place
- 2216, Rayburn House Office Building; Washington, D.C. 20515

Phone number
- (202)-225-4151

The House Armed Services Subcommittee on Readiness is a subcommittee of the House Armed Services Committee in the United States House of Representatives.

The Chair of the subcommittee is Jack Bergman of Michigan and its Ranking Member is Democrat John Garamendi of California.

== Jurisdiction ==
The Readiness Subcommittee exercises oversight and legislative jurisdiction over:

1. Military readiness
2. Training
3. Logistics and maintenance issues and programs
4. Military construction
5. Military installations
6. Family housing issues
7. Base Realignment and Closure

== Members, 119th Congress ==
Majority	Minority
Jack Bergman, Michigan, Chair; Joe Wilson, South Carolina; Austin Scott, Georgia; Carlos Giménez, Florida; James Moylan, Guam; Cory Mills, Florida; Clay Higgins, Louisiana; Pat Harrigan, North Carolina; Mark Messmer, Indiana; Derek Schmidt, Kansas	John Garamendi, California; Marilyn Strickland, Washington; Gabe Vasquez, New Mexico; Chris Deluzio, Pennsylvania; Jill Tokuda, Hawaii; Don Davis, North Carolina; Eric Sorensen, Illinois; Sarah Elfreth, Maryland; Derek Tran, California
Ex officio
Mike Rogers, Alabama	Adam Smith, Washington

== Historical membership rosters ==
=== 118th Congress ===
Majority	Minority
Mike Waltz, Florida, Chair; Joe Wilson, South Carolina; Austin Scott, Georgia; Mike Johnson, Louisiana (until October 25, 2023); Brad Finstad, Minnesota; Carlos A. Giménez, Florida; James Moylan, Guam; Jennifer Kiggans, Virginia; Dale Strong, Alabama	John Garamendi, California, Ranking Member; Jason Crow, Colorado; Marilyn Strickland, Washington; Veronica Escobar, Texas; Mikie Sherrill, New Jersey; Jill Tokuda, Hawaii; Gabe Vasquez, New Mexico; Don Davis, North Carolina
Ex officio
Mike Rogers, Alabama	Adam Smith, Washington

=== 115th Congress ===
Majority	Minority
Joe Wilson, South Carolina, Chairman; Rob Bishop, Utah; Austin Scott, Georgia; Steve Russell, Oklahoma; Mike Rogers, Alabama; Vicky Hartzler, Missouri; Elise Stefanik, New York; Martha McSally, Arizona; Scott DesJarlais, Tennessee; Trent Kelly, Mississippi; Mike Galagher, Wisconsin	Madeleine Bordallo, Guam, Ranking Member; Joe Courtney, Connecticut; Tulsi Gabbard, Hawaii; Carol Shea-Porter, New Hampshire; Salud Carbajal, California; Stephanie Murphy, Florida; Ro Khanna, California
Ex officio
Mac Thornberry, Texas	Adam Smith, Washington

=== 116th Congress ===
Majority	Minority
John Garamendi, California, Chair; Tulsi Gabbard, Hawaii; Andy Kim, New Jersey; Kendra Horn, Oklahoma; Chrissy Houlahan, Pennsylvania; Jason Crow, Colorado; Xochitl Torres Small, New Mexico; Elissa Slotkin, Michigan; Veronica Escobar, Texas; Deb Haaland, New Mexico	Doug Lamborn, Colorado, Ranking Member; Austin Scott, Georgia; Joe Wilson, South Carolina; Rob Bishop, Utah; Mike Rogers, Alabama; Mo Brooks, Alabama; Elise Stefanik, New York; Jack Bergman, Michigan
Ex officio
Adam Smith, Washington	Mac Thornberry, Texas

=== 117th Congress ===
Majority	Minority
John Garamendi, California, Chair; Elissa Slotkin, Michigan, Vice Chair; Joe Courtney, Connecticut; Jackie Speier, California; Jason Crow, Colorado; Jared Golden, Maine; Elaine Luria, Virginia; Kai Kahele, Hawaii; Marilyn Strickland, Washington	Doug Lamborn, Colorado, Ranking Member; Joe Wilson, South Carolina; Austin Scott, Georgia; Jack Bergman, Michigan; Mike Johnson, Louisiana; Mark E. Green, Tennessee; Lisa McClain, Michigan; Blake Moore, Utah
Ex officio
Adam Smith, Washington	Mike Rogers, Alabama

== See also ==
- United States Senate Armed Services Subcommittee on Readiness and Management Support
