= Subcommittee on Oversight and Investigations =

Subcommittee on Oversight and Investigations may refer to many of several United States Congressional subcommittees:

- United States House Armed Services Subcommittee on Oversight and Investigations
- United States House Energy Subcommittee on Oversight and Investigations
- United States House Financial Services Subcommittee on Oversight and Investigations
- United States House Foreign Affairs Subcommittee on Oversight and Investigations
- United States House Homeland Security Subcommittee on Management, Investigations, and Oversight
- United States House Intelligence Subcommittee on Oversight and Investigations
- United States House Science Subcommittee on Investigations and Oversight
- United States House Small Business Subcommittee on Investigations and Oversight
- United States House Veterans' Affairs Subcommittee on Oversight and Investigations

== See also ==
- United States House Committee on Oversight and Government Reform
- United States Senate Homeland Security Subcommittee on Financial and Contracting Oversight
