= United States House Intelligence Subcommittee on Defense Intelligence and Overhead Architecture =

Permanent select subcommittee of Permanent Select Committee on Intelligence
- Active United States House of Representatives; 119th Congress

Leadership
- Chair: Dan Crenshaw (R)
- Ranking Member: Mike Quigley (D)

Structure
- Seats: 10 (10 currently filled) 6/6 4/4
- Political parties: Majority (6): Republican (6); Minority (4): Democratic (4)

Meeting place
- HVC304, The Capitol; Washington, D.C. 20515

Phone number
- (202)-225-4121

The House Intelligence Subcommittee on Defense Intelligence and Overhead Architecture is one of the four subcommittees within the Permanent Select Committee on Intelligence. During the 117th Congress, it was known as the Subcommittee on Department of Defense Intelligence and Warfighter Support.

== Members, 118th Congress ==
Majority	Minority
Trent Kelly, Mississippi, Chair; Brad Wenstrup, Ohio; Chris Stewart, Utah; Rick Crawford, Arkansas; Brian Fitzpatrick, Pennsylvania; Mike Garcia, California	Chrissy Houlahan, Pennsylvania, Ranking Member; Jason Crow, Colorado; Stacey Plaskett, Virgin Islands; Abigail Spanberger, Virginia
Ex officio
Mike Turner, Ohio	Jim Himes, Connecticut

== Members, 117th Congress ==
Majority	Minority
Peter Welch, Vermont, Chair; Jim Himes, Connecticut; Jackie Speier, California; Mike Quigley, Illinois; Sean Patrick Maloney, New York; Jason Crow, Colorado	Brad Wenstrup, Ohio, Ranking Member; Rick Crawford, Arkansas; Markwayne Mullin, Oklahoma; Trent Kelly, Mississippi; Brian Fitzpatrick, Pennsylvania
Ex officio
Adam Schiff, California	Mike Turner, Ohio
