= United States House Permanent Select Committee on Intelligence =

Congressional committee

House Intelligence Committee
Permanent select committee
- Active United States House of Representatives; 119th Congress

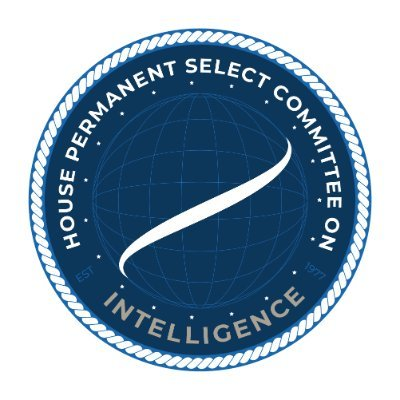
- Seal of the House Permanent Select Committee on Intelligence

History
- Formed: July 14, 1977
- Formerly known as: Select Committee on Intelligence

Leadership
- Chair: Rick Crawford (R); Since January 16, 2025
- Ranking Member: Jim Himes (D); Since February 1, 2023

Structure
- Seats: 27 (27 currently filled) 15/15 12/12
- Political parties: Majority (15): Republican (15); Minority (12): Democratic (12)

Jurisdiction
- Purpose: to "oversee and make continuing studies of the intelligence activities and programs of the United States Government"
- Oversight authority: United States Intelligence Community
- Senate counterpart: United States Senate Select Committee on Intelligence

Subcommittees
- Central Intelligence Agency; National Security Agency and Cyber; Defense Intelligence and Overhead Architecture; National Intelligence Enterprise; Oversight and Investigations; Open Source Intelligence

Meeting place
- HVC304, The Capitol; Washington, D.C. 20515

Website
- intelligence.house.gov (Republican) democrats-intelligence.house.gov (Democratic)

Phone number
- (202)-225-4121

The United States House Permanent Select Committee on Intelligence (HPSCI), also known as the House Intelligence Committee, is a committee of the United States House of Representatives, currently chaired by Rick Crawford (R-AR-01). It is the primary committee in the House charged with the oversight of the United States Intelligence Community, though it does share some jurisdiction with other House committees, including the Armed Services Committee for some matters dealing with the Department of Defense and the various branches of the U.S. military.

The committee was preceded by the Select Committee on Intelligence between 1975 and 1977. House Resolution 658 established the permanent select committee, giving it status equal to a standing committee, on July 14, 1977.

== Jurisdiction ==
The committee oversees all or part of the following executive branch departments and agencies:

- Office of the Director of National Intelligence
- Central Intelligence Agency
- Defense Intelligence Agency
- Department of Defense
- Department of Energy
- Department of Homeland Security
- Department of Justice
- Department of State
- Department of Treasury
- Drug Enforcement Administration
- Federal Bureau of Investigation
- National Geospatial-Intelligence Agency
- National Reconnaissance Office
- National Security Agency
- Office of Naval Intelligence
- Sixteenth Air Force
- Space Delta 7
- Army Intelligence and Security Command
- Coast Guard Intelligence
- Marine Corps Intelligence Activity

== History ==
Prior to establishing the permanent select committee in 1977, the House of Representatives established the "Select Committee on Intelligence", commonly referred to as the "Pike Committee", so named after its last chairman, Otis G. Pike of New York. The select committee had originally been established in February 1975 under the chairmanship of Congressman Lucien Nedzi of Michigan. Following Nedzi's resignation in June, the committee was reconstituted with Pike as chair, in July 1975, with its mandate expiring January 31, 1976. Under Pike's chairmanship, the committee investigated illegal activities by the Central Intelligence Agency (CIA) and the Federal Bureau of Investigation (FBI).

The final report of the Pike Committee was never officially published due to Congressional opposition. However, unauthorized versions of the draft final report were leaked to the press. CBS News reporter Daniel Schorr was called to testify before Congress, but refused to divulge his source. Major portions of the report were published by The Village Voice, and a full copy of the draft was published in England.

During the 1980s the HPSCI worked to acquire access to covert action notifications of the CIA, as well as to strengthen the role of the committee in intelligence agency funding. Under the Reagan administration, the HPSCI and United States Senate Select Committee on Intelligence (SSCI) worked with Director of Central Intelligence William J. Casey on what was known as the "Casey Accords". The accords required that covert action findings were to be accompanied by "scope papers" that included a risk/gain assessment of each such activity. However, the deal was not acceptable to the HPSCI, and after the Iran–Contra affair, more pressure was placed on strengthening the oversight of committees.

=== Russian interference investigation, 2017 ===
In 2017, the committee was tasked along with the SSCI to evaluate the degree of Russian interference in the 2016 US elections. The committee was also investigating allegations of wiretapping of Donald Trump, as well as ties between Russian officials and members of Trump's presidential campaign. The committee came under intense scrutiny in 2017 and 2018 due to allegations of partisanship and leaks of classified information by members and their staff. In March 2018, the investigation into Russian interference in the 2016 elections was abruptly ended by the committee's Republican members despite the assertion by Democratic members that the investigation was incomplete and had failed to gather pertinent information. Notably, House Intelligence Republicans released a draft of their investigatory report which contradicted some findings of the U.S. Intelligence Community and was written without the input of House Democrats. In March 2018, after further disagreements, Republican committee member Tom Rooney claimed that the committee had "lost all credibility" and had become "a political forum for people to leak information to drive the day's news."

=== Investigation of Trump's finances and Russian ties, 2019 ===
With the change of party leadership in the House in the 116th United States Congress, the committee launched a probe of Trump's finances and Russian ties in February 2019. In June 2019, in the course of hearings on the national security implications of climate change, the White House blocked the submission of a statement by the State Department's Bureau of Intelligence and Research Office of the Geographer and Global Issues, and the analyst who wrote the statement, Rod Schoonover, resigned.

=== Chinese hacking of staff emails, 2025 ===
In December 2025, intrusions were detected in staff email systems and later attributed to Salt Typhoon.

== Members, 119th Congress ==
Majority	Minority
Rick Crawford, Arkansas, Chair; Elise Stefanik, New York; Trent Kelly, Mississippi, Vice Chair; Darin LaHood, Illinois; Brian Fitzpatrick, Pennsylvania; Austin Scott, Georgia; French Hill, Arkansas; Dan Crenshaw, Texas; Ronny Jackson, Texas; Scott Perry, Pennsylvania; Ann Wagner, Missouri; Ben Cline, Virginia; Greg Steube, Florida; Claudia Tenney, New York; Pat Fallon, Texas	Jim Himes, Connecticut, Ranking Member; Andre Carson, Indiana; Joaquin Castro, Texas; Raja Krishnamoorthi, Illinois; Jason Crow, Colorado; Ami Bera, California; Stacey Plaskett, U.S. Virgin Islands; Josh Gottheimer, New Jersey; Jimmy Gomez, California; Chrissy Houlahan, Pennsylvania; Mike Quigley, Illinois; Steve Cohen, Tennessee
Ex officio
Mike Johnson, Louisiana	Hakeem Jeffries, New York

== Subcommittees ==
118th Subcommittee	Chair	Ranking Member
Central Intelligence Agency Subcommittee	Rick Crawford (R-AR)	André Carson (D-IN)
National Intelligence Enterprise Subcommittee	Brian Fitzpatrick (R-PA)	Stacey Plaskett (D-VI)
Defense Intelligence and Overhead Architecture Subcommittee	Trent Kelly (R-MS)	Chrissy Houlahan (D-PA)
National Security Agency and Cyber Subcommittee	Darin LaHood (R-IL)	Josh Gottheimer (D-NJ)
Oversight and Investigations Subcommittee	Brad Wenstrup (R-OH)	Jimmy Gomez (D-CA)

== Historical membership rosters ==
=== 118th Congress ===
Majority	Minority
Mike Turner, Ohio, Chair; Brad Wenstrup, Ohio; Rick Crawford, Arkansas; Elise Stefanik, New York; Trent Kelly, Mississippi; Darin LaHood, Illinois; Brian Fitzpatrick, Pennsylvania; Austin Scott, Georgia; French Hill, Arkansas; Dan Crenshaw, Texas; Mike Waltz, Florida; Mike Garcia, California; Scott Perry, Pennsylvania; Ronny Jackson, Texas	Jim Himes, Connecticut, Ranking Member; Andre Carson, Indiana; Joaquin Castro, Texas; Raja Krishnamoorthi, Illinois; Jason Crow, Colorado; Ami Bera, California; Stacey Plaskett, U.S. Virgin Islands; Josh Gottheimer, New Jersey; Jimmy Gomez, California; Chrissy Houlahan, Pennsylvania; Abigail Spanberger, Virginia
Ex officio
Mike Johnson, Louisiana	Hakeem Jeffries, New York

Subcommittees

118th Subcommittee	Chair	Ranking Member
Central Intelligence Agency Subcommittee	Rick Crawford (R-AR)	André Carson (D-IN)
National Intelligence Enterprise Subcommittee	Brian Fitzpatrick (R-PA)	Stacey Plaskett (D-VI)
Defense Intelligence and Overhead Architecture Subcommittee	Trent Kelly (R-MS)	Chrissy Houlahan (D-PA)
National Security Agency and Cyber Subcommittee	Darin LaHood (R-IL)	Josh Gottheimer (D-NJ)
Oversight and Investigations Subcommittee	Brad Wenstrup (R-OH)	Jimmy Gomez (D-CA)

=== 117th Congress ===
Majority	Minority
Adam Schiff, California, Chair; Jim Himes, Connecticut; André Carson, Indiana; Jackie Speier, California; Mike Quigley, Illinois; Eric Swalwell, California; Joaquin Castro, Texas; Peter Welch, Vermont; Sean Patrick Maloney, New York; Val Demings, Florida; Raja Krishnamoorthi, Illinois; Jim Cooper, Tennessee; Jason Crow, Colorado	Mike Turner, Ohio, ranking member; Brad Wenstrup, Ohio; Chris Stewart, Utah; Rick Crawford, Arkansas; Elise Stefanik, New York; Markwayne Mullin, Oklahoma; Trent Kelly, Mississippi; Darin LaHood, Illinois; Brian Fitzpatrick, Pennsylvania; Mike Gallagher, Wisconsin
Ex officio
Nancy Pelosi, California	Kevin McCarthy, California

Subcommittees

117th Subcommittee	Chair	Ranking Member
Strategic Technologies and Advanced Research (STAR) Subcommittee	Jim Himes (D-CT)	Chris Stewart (R-UT)
Counterterrorism, Counterintelligence, and Counterproliferation (C3) Subcommittee	André Carson (D-IN)	Rick Crawford (R-AR)
Intelligence Modernization and Readiness (INMAR) Subcommittee	Eric Swalwell (D-CA)	Markwayne Mullin (R-OK)
Defense Intelligence and Warfighter Support (DIWS) Subcommittee	Peter Welch (D-VT)	Brad Wenstrup (R-OH)

== Chairs ==
=== Select Committee chairs ===
Name	Party	State	Start	End
Lucien Nedzi	Democratic	Michigan	1975	
Otis Pike	Democratic	New York	1975	1976

=== Permanent Select Committee chairs ===
Name	Party	State	Start	End
Edward Boland	Democratic	Massachusetts	1977	1985
Lee Hamilton	Democratic	Indiana	1985	1987
Louis Stokes	Democratic	Ohio	1987	1989
Anthony Beilenson	Democratic	California	1989	1991
Dave McCurdy	Democratic	Oklahoma	1991	1993
Dan Glickman	Democratic	Kansas	1993	1995
Larry Combest	Republican	Texas	1995	1997
Porter Goss	Republican	Florida	1997	2004
Pete Hoekstra	Republican	Michigan	2004	2007
Silvestre Reyes	Democratic	Texas	2007	2011
Mike Rogers	Republican	Michigan	2011	2015
Devin Nunes	Republican	California	2015	2019
Adam Schiff	Democratic	California	2019	2023
Mike Turner	Republican	Ohio	2023	2025
Rick Crawford	Republican	Arkansas	2025	present

== Ranking members ==
Name	Party	State	Start	End
Robert McClory	Republican	Illinois	1975	1976
Bob Wilson	Republican	California	1977	1979
Kenneth Robinson	Republican	Virginia	1979	1985
Bob Stump	Republican	Arizona	1985	1989
Henry Hyde	Republican	Illinois	1989	1991
Bud Shuster	Republican	Pennsylvania	1991	1993
Larry Combest	Republican	Texas	1993	1995
Norm Dicks	Democratic	Washington	1995	1999
Nancy Pelosi	Democratic	California	1999	2003
Jane Harman	Democratic	California	2003	2007
Pete Hoekstra	Republican	Michigan	2007	2011
Dutch Ruppersberger	Democratic	Maryland	2011	2015
Adam Schiff	Democratic	California	2015	2019
Devin Nunes	Republican	California	2019	2022
Mike Turner	Republican	Ohio	2022	2023
Jim Himes	Democratic	Connecticut	2023	present

== See also ==
- COINTELPRO
- Church Committee
- Family Jewels
- List of United States House of Representatives committees
- Timeline of investigations into Trump and Russia (2019)
- United States President's Commission on CIA Activities within the United States
- United States Senate Select Committee on Intelligence
