= November 2025 United States military video controversy =

Video on refusing illegal orders

In November 2025, six Democratic members of the United States Congress—Mark Kelly, Elissa Slotkin, Jason Crow, Chrissy Houlahan, Chris Deluzio and Maggie Goodlander—appeared in a video in which they told military service members that they "can refuse illegal orders".

The second Trump administration subsequently attempted to indict the six and Secretary of Defense Pete Hegseth attempted to retaliate against Kelly.

== Video ==
the video

In the video, they said:

We want to speak directly to members of the military and the intelligence community who take risks each day to keep Americans safe. We know you are under enormous stress and pressure right now. Americans trust their military, but that trust is at risk. This administration is pitting our uniform military and intelligence community professionals against American citizens like us. You all swore an oath to protect and defend this Constitution. And right now, the threats to our Constitution aren't just coming from abroad, but from right here at home. Our laws are clear. You can refuse illegal orders. (...) You must refuse illegal orders. No one has to carry out orders that violate the law or our constitution. We know this is hard and that it's a difficult time to be a public servant. But whether you're serving in the CIA, the Army, our Navy, the Air Force, your vigilance is critical. And know that we have your back because now more than ever, the American people need you. We need you to stand up for our laws, our Constitution, and who we are as Americans. (...) Don't give up the ship.

== Reactions ==
Avatar of Donald J. Trump

Donald J. Trump
(@realDonaldTrump)
tweeted:

English:

SEDITIOUS BEHAVIOR, punishable by DEATH!

November 20, 2025

White House Press Secretary Karoline Leavitt on November 20, 2025

President Donald Trump called those in the video traitors who should be charged with sedition punishable by death, and shared a social media post calling for them to be hanged.

David D. Cole compared Trump's actions to the Espionage Act.

Haley Fuller wrote on Military.com that the video was "misguided" because "the messaging was vague", it did not identify "any specific order they believed might be unlawful, nor did they offer examples illustrating what troops should or should not obey" and that without "concrete examples, legal context or acknowledgment of process (...) the video oversimplifies a complex legal area that service members navigate at real personal risk."

== Aftermath ==
On November 24, Pete Hegseth referred the video for a review of "potentially unlawful conduct by Captain Mark E. Kelly". In December 2025, the Pentagon told multiple media outlets that its "preliminary review" was being escalated "to an official Command Investigation". In January 2026, Hegseth tweeted that the administration "has initiated retirement grade determination proceedings" and "also issued a formal Letter of Censure, which outlines the totality of Captain (for now) Kelly’s reckless misconduct" in "a necessary process step".

In November 2025, the six lawmakers who appeared in the video said the Federal Bureau of Investigation was investigating them. In February 2026, the administration reportedly failed to convince a single juror to indict them.

=== Kelly v. Hegseth ===
Kelly v. Hegseth
- Court: United States District Court for the District of Columbia
- Full case name: Mark Kelly, Arizona Senator v. Pete Hegseth, as Secretary of Defense, US Department of Defense, John Phelan, as Secretary of the Navy, US Department of the Navy
- Started: January 12, 2026
- Docket nos.: 1:26-cv-00081

Court membership
- Judge sitting: Richard J. Leon

Keywords
- First Amendment; Speech or Debate Clause; Separation of powers under the United States Constitution; due process; 10 U.S.C. § 1370; Administrative Procedure Act

In January 2026, Kelly sued Hegseth and the Pentagon. In February 2026, Judge Richard J. Leon granted a preliminary injunction against Hegseth, writing "Defendants have trampled on Senator Kelly's First Amendment freedoms and threatened the constitutional liberties of millions of military retirees".

== See also ==
- Conscientous objector
- Superior orders
- Targeting of political opponents and civil society under the second Trump administration
- United States war crimes
- Domestic policy of the second Trump administration § Military
