= Dan Crenshaw =

American politician (born 1984)

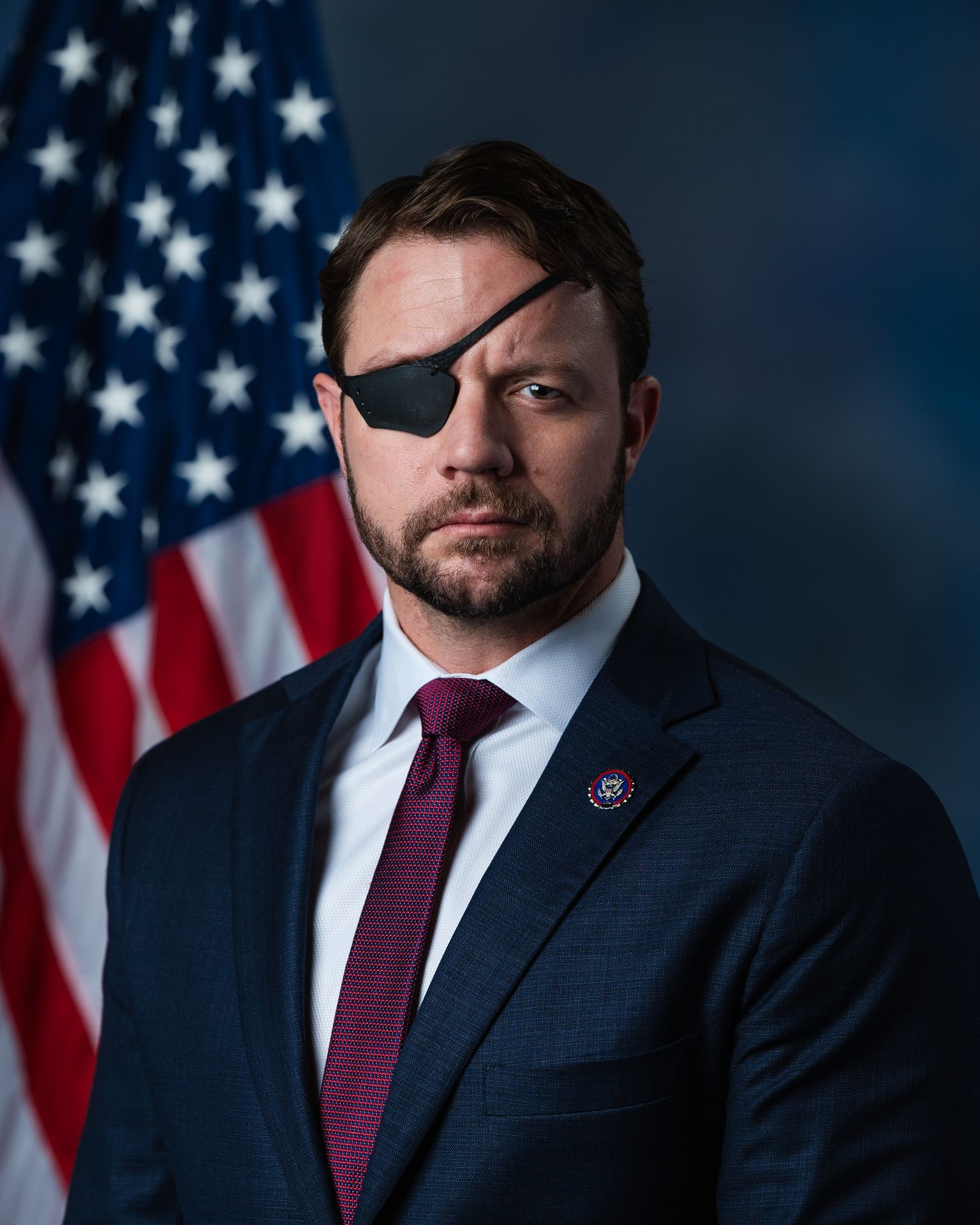
- Official portrait, 2024

Member of the U.S. House of Representatives from Texas's 2nd district
- Incumbent
- Assumed office January 3, 2019
- Preceded by: Ted Poe

Personal details
- Born: Daniel Reed Crenshaw; March 14, 1984 (age 42) Aberdeen, Scotland
- Party: Republican
- Spouse: Tara Blake (m. 2013)
- Children: 1
- Education: Tufts University (BA); Harvard University (MPA)
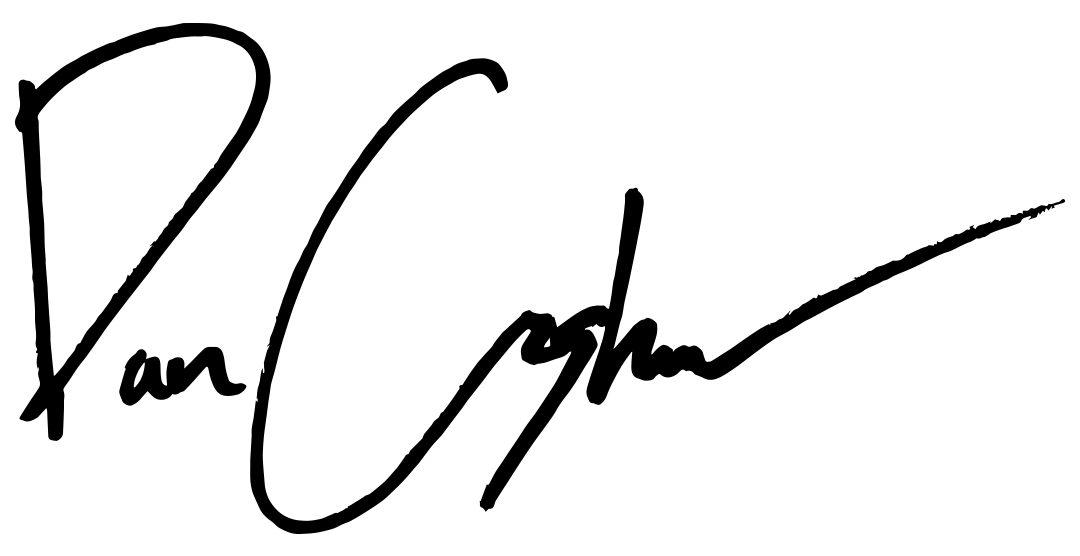
- Signature
- Website: House website Campaign website

Military service
- Branch/service: United States Navy
- Years of service: 2006–2016
- Rank: Lieutenant commander
- Unit: United States Navy SEALs; SEAL Team 3
- Battles/wars: Iraq War; War in Afghanistan (WIA)
- Awards: Purple Heart; Bronze Star Medal (2); Navy and Marine Corps Commendation Medal with valor
- Crenshaw's voice Crenshaw on uprisings in Cuba. Recorded July 20, 2021

Daniel Reed Crenshaw (born March 14, 1984) is an American politician and former United States Navy SEAL officer serving as the U.S. representative for Texas's 2nd congressional district since 2019. He is a member of the Republican Party.

Crenshaw was a commissioned officer in the U.S. Navy, and served on SEAL Team 3 in the War in Afghanistan, reaching the rank of lieutenant commander. He was wounded in action during his third deployment, losing his right eye to an improvised explosive device. He was later a legislative assistant to Representative Pete Sessions.

Crenshaw was first elected to Congress in 2018. In 2026, he lost renomination in the Republican primary to state representative Steve Toth.

== Early life and education ==
Daniel Reed Crenshaw was born to American parents in Aberdeen, Scotland, on March 14, 1984. He grew up in Katy, Texas. His mother Susan died of cancer when he was ten years old. His father, Jim Crenshaw, is a petroleum engineer who worked abroad, and Crenshaw spent time growing up in Ecuador and Colombia, developing proficiency in Spanish. In 2002, he graduated from Colegio Nueva Granada in Bogotá, Colombia.

After high school, Crenshaw returned to the United States and attended Tufts University, graduating in 2006 with a Bachelor of Arts in international relations and a minor in physics. After a decade of military service, he studied public administration at Harvard University's John F. Kennedy School of Government, receiving a Master of Public Administration in 2017. He worked as a military legislative assistant for U.S. representative Pete Sessions.

== Military service ==
While at Tufts, Crenshaw joined the Naval Reserve Officers Training Corps and received an officer's commission in the U.S. Navy after graduation. He received orders to Basic Underwater Demolition/SEAL training (BUD/S) at Naval Amphibious Base Coronado. After six months of training, Crenshaw graduated with BUD/S class 264. He completed SEAL qualification training in June 2008 and received the 1130 designator as a Naval Special Warfare Officer, entitled to wear the Special Warfare Insignia. Crenshaw served for ten years and five tours of duty, reaching the rank of lieutenant commander. His first deployment was to Fallujah, Iraq, where he joined SEAL Team Three. He was based out of Naval Amphibious Base Coronado in Coronado, California.

Crenshaw lost his right eye in 2012 during his third deployment when he was hit by an IED explosion in Afghanistan's Helmand Province. The blast destroyed his eye, and he required surgery to save the vision in his left eye. He remained in the Navy for four years after the injury, and served his fourth and fifth tours of duty in Bahrain and South Korea.

As a Navy SEAL, Crenshaw was awarded two Bronze Star Medals, one with "V" device, the Purple Heart, and the Navy and Marine Corps Commendation Medal with valor. He medically retired from military service in 2016 with the rank of lieutenant commander.

== U.S. House of Representatives ==
=== Elections ===
==== 2018 ====
In 2018, Crenshaw ran for the United States House of Representatives in Texas's 2nd congressional district, which includes northern and western Houston, including Kingwood, Humble, Atascocita, Spring, and the Rice University area, to succeed the retiring Ted Poe. He announced his candidacy in November 2017. Crenshaw credited national security analyst John Noonan for encouraging him to run for Congress. In a February 2018 interview, he said that border security and immigration reform would be two of his campaign issues.

Crenshaw and Kevin Roberts advanced from the nine-candidate first round of the Republican primary election to face each other in a runoff election; Crenshaw received 155 votes more than Kathaleen Wall, a candidate backed by Senator Ted Cruz and Governor Greg Abbott. The lead-up to the runoff election was contentious. A super PAC funded by Roberts' brother-in-law, Mark Lanier, focused on Crenshaw's 2015 criticisms of then-presidential candidate Donald Trump, despite Roberts having also been critical of Trump in the past. The ads also compared Crenshaw's policy proposals to those of President Barack Obama and Senator Bernie Sanders. Gaining the endorsement of Senator Tom Cotton, Crenshaw received national attention, appearing in print and television, including on Laura Ingraham's show on Fox Business.

Crenshaw won the runoff to advance to the November general election. On November 6, he defeated Democratic nominee Todd Litton, 52.8% to 45.6%. After the election, Crenshaw called for the depoliticization of comedy and sports and expressed a desire that political rhetoric be toned down.

On the November 3 episode of Saturday Night Live, comedian Pete Davidson joked about the appearances of multiple candidates in the 2018 midterm elections and described Crenshaw as looking like a "hit man in a porno movie" while adding that he lost his eye in "war or whatever". The joke received widespread criticism and on the following episode, Davidson and Crenshaw appeared on air together. Davidson offered an apology, which Crenshaw accepted. Crenshaw also used the segment to advocate for veterans' issues. Crenshaw and others have speculated that the joke may have helped him win, as well as aided later fundraising. Two years later, Davidson rescinded his apology, saying he had been "forced to apologize", adding that "I didn't think I did anything wrong." In response, Crenshaw called it "a little sad" that Davidson "can't stop thinking" about him.

==== 2020 ====
Crenshaw was reelected in 2020, defeating Democratic nominee Sima Ladjevardian from Houston, Texas with 55.6% of the vote to Ladjevardian's 42.8%. During the campaign, he spent over $11 million through October 16, 2020, making it one of the most expensive Congressional races in the country.

==== 2022 ====
Crenshaw was reelected in 2022, defeating Democratic nominee Robin Fulford by a nearly two-to-one margin.

==== 2024 ====
Crenshaw was reelected in 2024, defeating Democratic nominee Peter Filler by 66% to 34%.

==== 2026 ====
Crenshaw, the only House Republican from Texas seeking re-election without a Trump endorsement, lost the Republican primary to Steve Toth, who campaigned to his right. Even though Crenshaw raised $1.3 million more than his opponent, Crenshaw lost to Toth in a redrawn district where newly added territory in Montgomery County brought in more of Toth’s supporters, according to reports.

=== Tenure ===
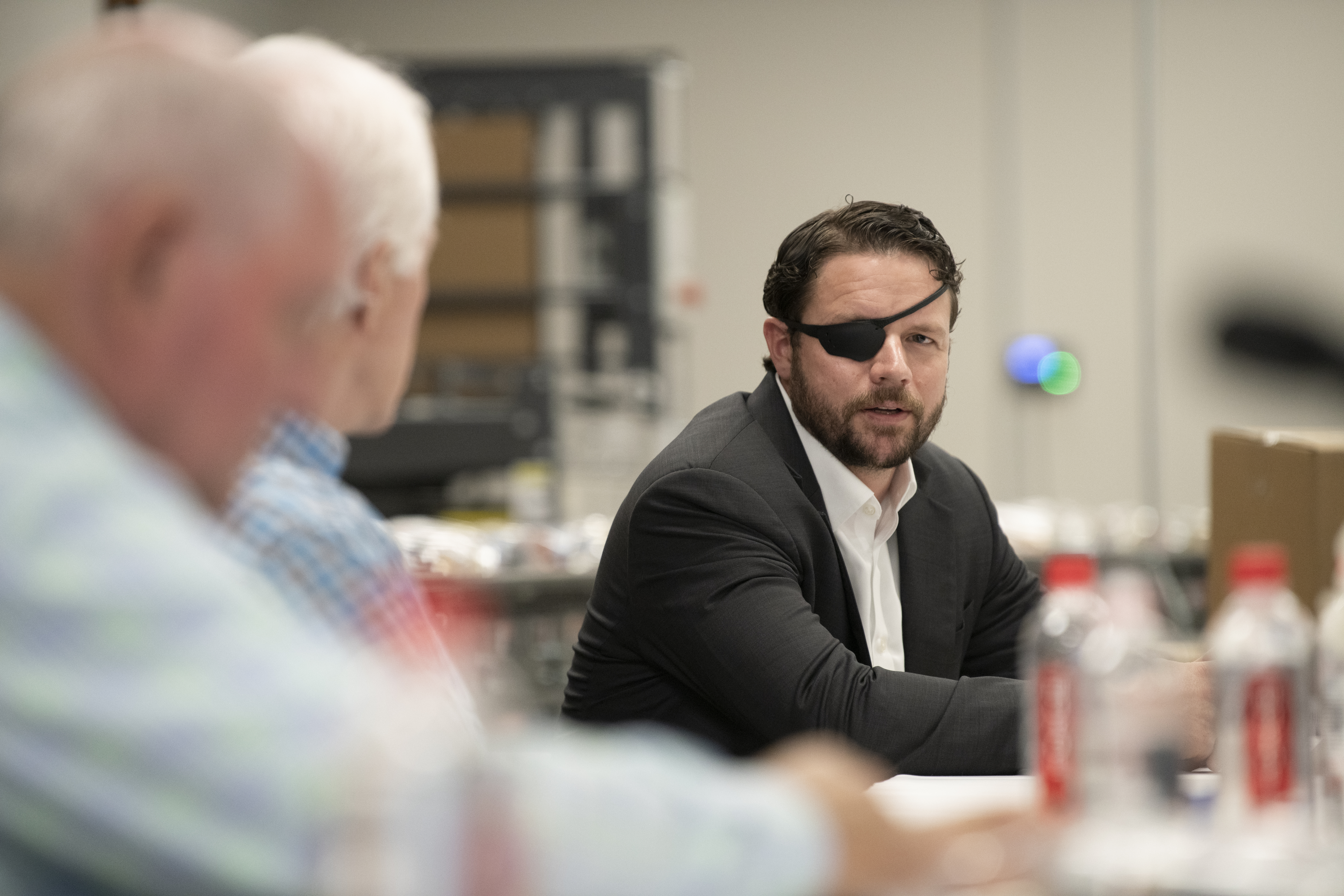
Crenshaw meeting with Sonny Perdue and John Cornyn in 2020

Crenshaw spoke at the 2020 Republican National Convention on August 26, 2020.

The Inspector General of the Department of Veterans Affairs implicated Crenshaw and V.A. Secretary Robert Wilkie in a 2020 report as having engaged in a campaign of disparagement toward a female veteran who reported sexual assault to the Navy. Crenshaw said, "The Democrats created this narrative".

In March 2021, The Daily Beast reported that Crenshaw had violated the Stop Trading on Congressional Knowledge (STOCK) Act of 2012, a federal transparency and conflict-of-interest law, by failing to properly disclose stock trades that he made in March 2020.

Crenshaw is publicly critical of the Freedom Caucus, whom he regards as divisive "performance artists" for constantly attacking moderate Republicans.

In February 2025, a hot mic captured Crenshaw stating that he wanted to "fucking kill" conservative commentator Tucker Carlson. Carlson and Crenshaw have previously feuded; Carlson has dubbed Crenshaw "Eyepatch McCain" and one of the "dumbest" Republicans, while Crenshaw has called Carlson a "cowardly, know-nothing elitist". Crenshaw's comment sparked backlash from other conservatives, including Rep. Marjorie Taylor Greene and Elon Musk. Carlson responded "Why don't you come sit for an interview and we'll see how you do? I'll send you my address."

On February 24, 2026, Crenshaw voted against the ROTOR Act, which sought to require the installation of "specific location transmission technology" in all aircraft and repeal "certain military exemptions from the technology requirements". The bill was introduced by Texas senator Ted Cruz in response to the January 29, 2025, crash over the Potomac River near Ronald Reagan Washington National Airport.

=== Committee assignments ===
For the 119th Congress:

- Committee on Energy and Commerce
  - Subcommittee on Environment (Vice Chair)
  - Subcommittee on Health
  - Subcommittee on Oversight and Investigations
- Permanent Select Committee on Intelligence
  - Subcommittee on Central Intelligence Agency
  - Subcommittee on Defense Intelligence and Overhead Architecture (Chairman)

=== Caucus membership ===
- Republican Study Committee
- Congressional Western Caucus

== Political positions ==
=== Abortion ===
Crenshaw opposes abortion. In 2019, he received a 0% rating from NARAL Pro-Choice America and a 100% rating from the National Right to Life Committee. He has said that "life starts at conception", that he believes Roe v. Wade was a "bad precedent to set", and that abortion rights "should be decided by the states". When the Supreme Court decision Dobbs v. Jackson Women's Health Organization overturned Roe, Crenshaw released the statement: "Historic. The issue goes back to the states, back to the people."

=== Gun rights ===
Crenshaw opposes gun control measures. In response to the shootings in Dayton and El Paso, after an initial comment to possibly explore red flag laws as a possible solution to gun violence, Crenshaw argued that such laws should be discussed at state level rather than nationally, saying, "What you're essentially trying to do with a red flag law is enforce the law before the law has been broken, and that's a really difficult thing to do" and "if there's such a threat that they're threatening somebody with a weapon already, then they've already broken the law, so why do you need this other law?" after the 2022 Robb Elementary School shooting. In January 2025 Crenshaw introduced the "Preventing Unjust Red Flag Laws Act," which stops federal money being given to states which have red flag laws. This bill is presently with the House Judiciary Committee. Crenshaw has also said that raising the legal age to purchase a firearm to 21 is ineffective but supports expanding background checks to include juvenile criminal history.

In 2020 and 2022, Crenshaw received an "A+" rating and endorsement from the NRA Political Victory Fund.

=== COVID-19 pandemic ===
During the COVID-19 pandemic, Crenshaw said that Democrats and the media were exaggerating the threat. He was a high-profile defender of Trump's response to the pandemic. He did not wear face masks consistently in settings advised by health experts and mandated by Governor Greg Abbott.

Crenshaw argued that FDA regulations impeded the development of COVID-19 tests.

=== Healthcare ===
Crenshaw favors repealing the Affordable Care Act (Obamacare), describing it as an "unmitigated disaster". During his 2018 campaign, he advocated allowing Medicare to negotiate drug prices, becoming one of a handful of Republicans to endorse what was primarily a progressive idea. By 2019, however, Crenshaw had retreated from this position.

On May 24, 2019, Crenshaw co-sponsored a bill to extend time limits for claims under the September 11th Victim Compensation Fund Act.

Crenshaw has introduced legislation to fund research into the use of psychedelic therapy as a treatment option for military members suffering from PTSD and traumatic brain injuries.

The Crenshaw Amendment was a legislative provision introduced by Republican Rep. Dan Crenshaw of Texas which took the same approach as the Hyde Amendment, but with gender transition procedures. Dubbed "the new Hyde Amendment" by Crenshaw, it would have prohibited the use of Federal funds in Medicaid, the Children's Health Insurance Program (CHIP) and the Affordable Care Act from paying "for specified gender transition procedures" for both children and adults alike. The provision would have defined these procedures to mean "those that are intended to change the body of an individual to no longer correspond to the individual's biological sex (male or female), including specified surgeries, implants, and medications (e.g., hormones)," and exclude "procedures that are provided to an individual under the age of 18 with the consent of a parent or legal guardian and that are intended to (1) rectify early puberty, genetic disorders, or chromosomal abnormalities; (2) reverse prior gender transition procedures; or (3) prevent imminent death or impairment of a major bodily function." This legislation was included in the One Big Beautiful Bill Act as passed by the House of Representatives on May 22, 2025. On June 26, 2025, the Senate Parliamentarian ruled that the amendment violated the Byrd Rule, meaning that it would need to get 60 votes in the Senate in order to remain in the bill. Instead of bringing it up for a vote, Senate Republicans chose to remove the Crenshaw Amendment from the final bill entirely, shortly before voting to pass the final bill. If it had passed, the amendment would have taken effect in 2027. In the aftermath of the One Big Beautiful Bill Act, the Trump Administration took administrative action to prevent Medicaid from paying "for specified sex trait modification" for children in Medicaid starting in 2026.

=== Donald Trump ===
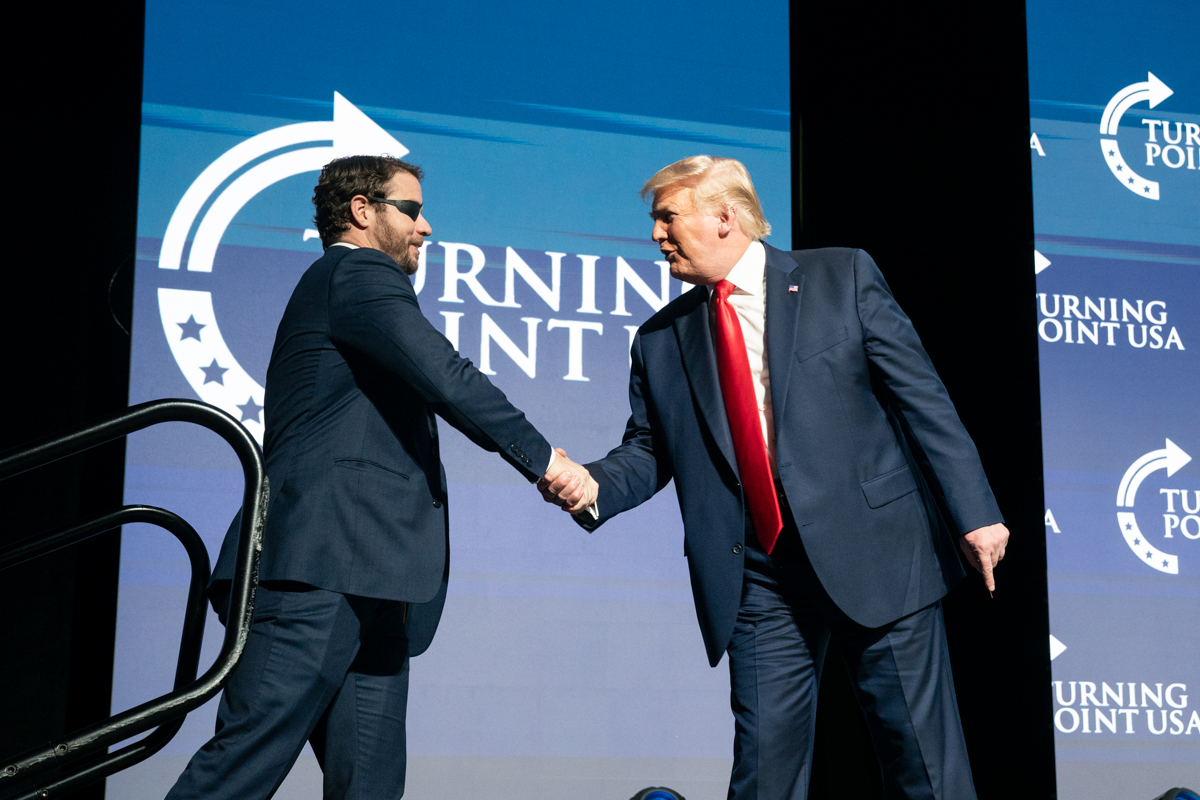
Crenshaw with President Donald Trump in December 2019

According to Politico, Crenshaw "voted with Donald Trump most of the time but isn't a loyalist. He's a stalwart conservative willing to criticize other conservatives."

Although Crenshaw had criticized some of Trump's statements in a 2015 Facebook post, he became a "staunch defender" of Trump after the 2016 election. He voted against both articles of impeachment the House of Representatives brought against Trump in 2019.

In 2020, Crenshaw defended the Trump administration's response to the COVID-19 pandemic. In a video Trump retweeted, Crenshaw rebutted criticisms that the Trump administration had been slow in responding to the virus.

Crenshaw spoke at the 2020 Republican National Convention, calling the United States "a country of heroes." He was one of few convention speakers not to mention Trump.

Crenshaw criticized the 2021 U.S. Capitol attack perpetrated by Trump supporters, and said that Trump should have ordered the rioters to stop. During the siege, he urged the protesters to "Stop this bullshit right now" on Twitter. Crenshaw condemned the rioting and some of his fellow congressional Representatives for "saying constantly this is our time to fight." While not naming any politicians, Crenshaw stated they were "lying to millions" and scattered when there was an actual threat to the Capitol. He deemed efforts to fight the Electoral College vote certification unconstitutional, and voted against the objections to the electoral vote in both Arizona and Pennsylvania, but defended Senators Ted Cruz and Josh Hawley against allegations that they stoked the riot. Crenshaw voted against the Trump impeachment on January 13, 2021. In a statement, Crenshaw said that while Trump's words had encouraged "unconstitutional theories that risk the stability of our nation", he had voted against the second impeachment because he felt Democrats had "rushed" the process and that impeaching a president who only had seven days left in office would serve little purpose and inflame further tensions.

After Liz Cheney was censured for voting to impeach Trump, Crenshaw asserted in an interview that the Republican Party needed "to move on" from claims the 2020 election was stolen, but also accused the media of continuing to weaponize the issue, arguing both were ignoring larger issues such as the economy, the COVID pandemic and illegal immigration. He also said, "I do not think Trump is the devil, and I won't say that; I don't think he's Jesus either." Crenshaw also supported Representative Adam Kinzinger, who sat on the January 6 select committee and is publicly critical of Trump, and criticized far-right members of the Freedom Caucus as "performance artists" and "grifters".

In 2022, on his podcast Hold These Truths, Crenshaw criticized Republicans who contested the results of the 2020 presidential election, saying of their efforts, "It was always a lie. The whole thing was always a lie. And it was a lie meant to rile people up".

=== Election reform ===
In 2019, Crenshaw voiced opposition to the For the People Act of 2019, saying it would "limit free speech drastically". He also said the bill would use taxpayer money to "legalize" the kind of electoral fraud that he alleges occurred on the Republican side in the 2018 election for North Carolina's District 9. PolitiFact rated Crenshaw's assertion about the North Carolina race "false", adding, "nothing in the bill that expands who can collect absentee ballots, allows people to fill out ballots for others, or loosens witnessing procedures for absentee ballots", as happened in that election. Crenshaw argued that the bill did not include a federal ban on ballot harvesting, and supported the American Civil Liberties Union's opposition to it over new campaign contribution revisions.

=== Environment ===
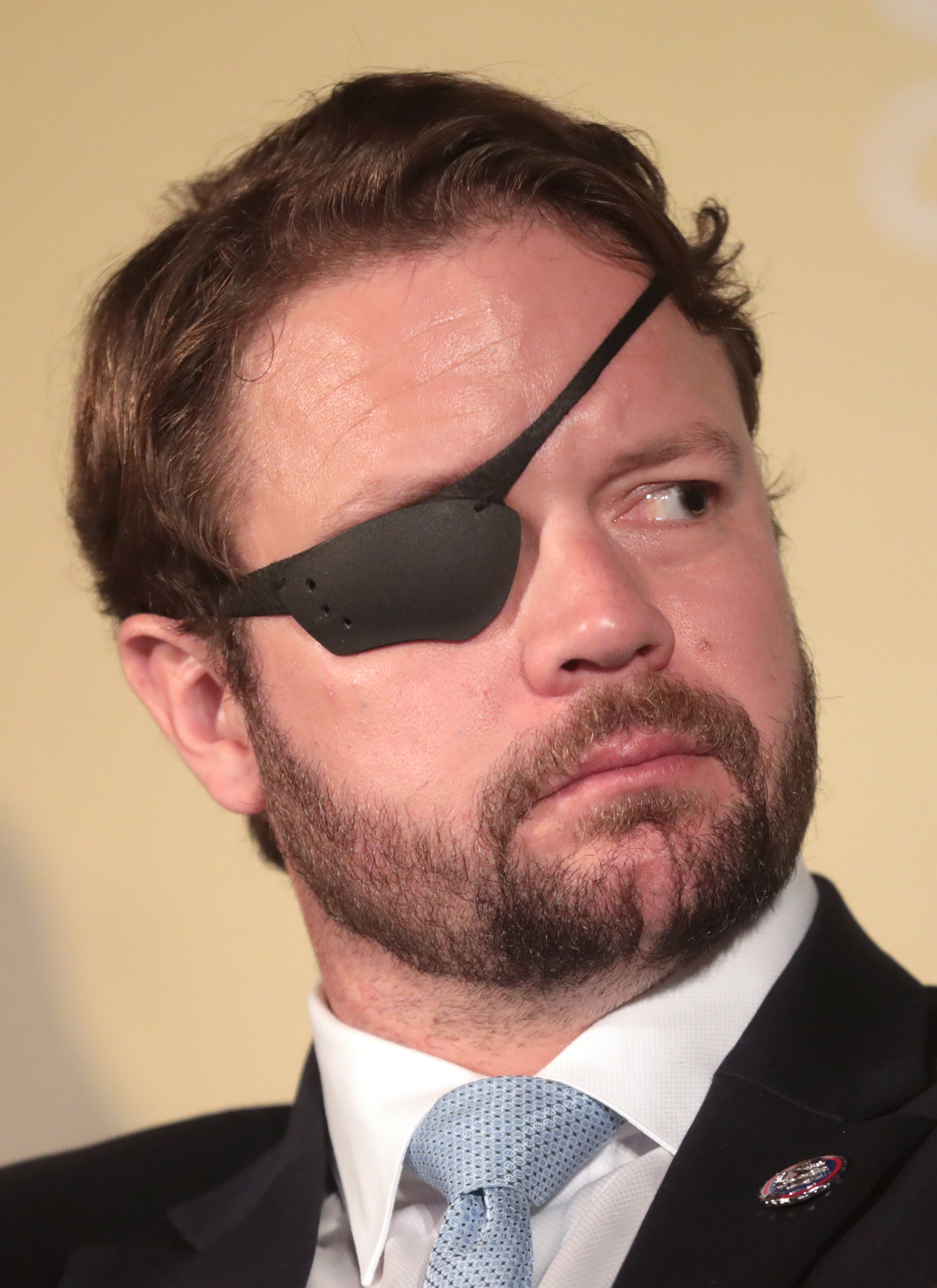
Crenshaw speaking at an environmental event in June 2022

During Crenshaw's 2018 campaign, his website made brief mention of global warming, applauding Trump for withdrawing from the Paris Climate Accords. Crenshaw called the agreement "costly and meaningless", virtue signaling, and bad policy. He also said, "We must use our money to develop better infrastructure." In 2018, Crenshaw called for a debate on the causes of climate change, adding, "We can't start off the conversation saying the climate is settled. The right way to have this conversation is to actually listen to what the science says on both sides."

In 2019, Crenshaw said, "climate change is occurring and that man-made emissions play a part in that. What isn't clear is how our actions will serve to reverse that warming trend, and what the cost-benefit outcome would be. Regardless, we should continue pursuing new green energy solutions that lessen our impact on the environment and create cleaner air and water." In 2020, he criticized solar and wind energy as "silly solutions" that "don't work," and instead advocated expanding nuclear energy and carbon capture technology.

During the 2021 Texas power crisis, Crenshaw argued that the Green New Deal would lead to similar crises.

=== Immigration ===
In 2016, Crenshaw harshly criticized then-candidate Trump's "insane rhetoric" toward Muslims and "hateful" speech. During Crenshaw's 2018 campaign, he defended Trump's proposal to build a border wall on the Mexico–United States border. In a May 2019 appearance on The View, he claimed that 80%–90% of asylum seeker requests "don't have a valid asylum claim"; news outlet PolitiFact called the claim "false", writing that although only 20% to 30% of asylum claims are granted, "experts said there are many reasons why cases might be closed or requests might be denied, regardless of the merits of a claim." In 2021, Crenshaw accused the Biden administration of provoking a crisis on the southern border by having a moratorium on deportations and reversing Trump's policies on asylum and illegal immigration. He has also argued that Mexican drug cartels have fueled illegal immigration by taking advantage of the U.S. asylum process to smuggle people into the country.

Crenshaw supports enforcing physical barriers and implementing technology at the southern border to prevent illegal immigration. He has also expressed a belief that people who try to enter the U.S. illegally "aren't bad people" but "they are breaking the law, and they're contributing to an unsustainable system" and are "cutting in front of the line of all the legal immigrants."

Crenshaw voted for the Further Consolidated Appropriations Act of 2020, which authorizes DHS to nearly double the available H-2B visas for the remainder of FY 2020. He also voted for the Consolidated Appropriations Act (H.R. 1158), which effectively prohibits ICE from cooperating with Health and Human Services to detain or remove illegal alien sponsors of unaccompanied alien children (UACs).

=== Social issues ===
Despite having previously expressing support for the legalization of same-sex marriage, Crenshaw voted against the Respect for Marriage Act, even after amendments allowing religious exemptions. Calling same-sex marriage a "tough issue", Crenshaw believes that government should not be involved in regulating marriage. In 2015, he took issue with people trying to suggest Christianity is as shocking and as violent as Islam, saying, "the worst thing modern Christianity stands for is anti-homosexual marriage, which is a far cry from sex slaves, sharia law and beheadings."

In the case of a 7-year-old transgender child who was the subject of a custody battle between a supportive mother and an unsupportive father, Crenshaw opined in favor of the father. The child, who had identified as a girl from the age of 3 years old, was seeking a gender transition. Following a judge's decision to grant custody to the mother, Crenshaw called the outcome "heart-breaking" and added, "[a] 7-year-old can't possibly make this decision or understand it. Parents should know better. I hope this father receives the public support he needs."

Crenshaw opposes federal funding to "subsidize college in general", but supports it in cases of vocational training. He opposes cancel culture, and athletes kneeling during the national anthem. He called Senator Tammy Duckworth unpatriotic for wanting a discussion on which statues to remove, including those of George Washington.

=== Foreign policy ===
Crenshaw supports cooperation with and support for Israel. During some of his public appearances, he has been targeted by anti-semitic white nationalists, known as Groypers, for his pro-Israel views. He voted to provide Israel with support following the 2023 Hamas attack on Israel. Crenshaw has received $233,000 from AIPAC as of 2025.

In 2019, Crenshaw co-sponsored a resolution opposing Trump's decision to withdraw U.S. troops from Syria, saying that it would embolden the Turkish military's assault on the Kurdish forces. He supported Trump's decision to kill Iranian major general Qasem Soleimani.

In April 2020, Crenshaw and Senator Tom Cotton introduced a bill that would allow civil suits against foreign states in incidents related to injury or death. The legislation came in response to the COVID-19 pandemic and calls for the Chinese government to be held accountable for "allow[ing] this virus to spread".

In 2022, Crenshaw voiced support for a $40 billion aid package to Ukraine. Fox News political commentator Tucker Carlson criticized him for this, calling Crenshaw "Eyepatch McCain"—a remark that itself drew much criticism.

== Electoral history ==
=== 2018 ===
Republican primary results, 2018
Party	Candidate	Votes	%
Republican	Kevin Roberts	15,273	33.0
Republican	Dan Crenshaw	12,679	27.4
Republican	Kathaleen Wall	12,524	27.1
Republican	Rick Walker	3,320	7.2
Republican	Johnny Havens	936	2.0
Republican	Justin Lurie	425	0.9
Republican	Jon Spiers	418	0.9
Republican	David Balat	348	0.8
Republican	Malcolm Whittaker	322	0.7
Total votes		46,245	100.0

Republican primary runoff results, 2018
Party	Candidate	Votes	%
Republican	Dan Crenshaw	20,322	69.8
Republican	Kevin Roberts	8,760	30.2
Total votes		29,082	100.0

Texas's 2nd congressional district, 2018
Party	Candidate	Votes	%
Republican	Dan Crenshaw	139,188	52.8
Democratic	Todd Litton	119,992	45.6
Libertarian	Patrick Gunnels	2,373	0.9
Independent	Scott Cubbler	1,839	0.7
Total votes		263,392	100.0
Republican hold			

=== 2020 ===
Republican primary results, 2020
Party	Candidate	Votes	%
Republican	Dan Crenshaw (incumbent)	48,693	100.0
Total votes		48,693	100.0

Texas's 2nd congressional district, 2020
Party	Candidate	Votes	%
Republican	Dan Crenshaw (incumbent)	192,828	55.6
Democratic	Sima Ladjevardian	148,374	42.8
Libertarian	Elliott Robert Scheirman	5,524	1.6
Total votes		346,726	100.0
Republican hold			

=== 2022 ===
Republican primary results
Party	Candidate	Votes	%
Republican	Dan Crenshaw (incumbent)	45,863	74.5
Republican	Jameson Ellis	10,195	16.6
Republican	Martin Etwop	2,785	4.5
Republican	Milam Langella	2,741	4.5
Total votes		61,584	100.0

Texas's 2nd congressional district, 2022
Party	Candidate	Votes	%
Republican	Dan Crenshaw (incumbent)	151,369	65.9
Democratic	Robin Fulford	78,216	34.0
Total votes		229,585	100.0
Republican hold			

=== 2024 ===
Republican primary results
Party	Candidate	Votes	%
Republican	Dan Crenshaw (incumbent)	40,379	59.50
Republican	Jameson Ellis	27,482	40.50
Total votes		67,861	100.0

Texas's 2nd congressional district, 2024
Party	Candidate	Votes	%
Republican	Dan Crenshaw (incumbent)	214,631	65.66
Democratic	Peter Filler	112,252	34.34
Total votes		326,883	100.0
Republican hold			

=== 2026 ===
Republican primary results
Party	Candidate	Votes	%
Republican	Steve Toth	36,830	55.79
Republican	Dan Crenshaw (incumbent)	26,859	40.69
Republican	Martin Etwop	1,216	1.84
Republican	Nicholas Lee Plumb	1,106	1.68
Total votes		66,011	100.0

== Personal life ==
Crenshaw married Tara Blake in 2013. He is a Methodist and hosts Hold These Truths, a podcast he launched in February 2020. They have one daughter, Susan Crenshaw, born on September 12, 2023, named after his late mother.

In April 2021, Crenshaw suffered a detached retina in his functional left eye, undergoing emergency surgery. As he recovered, he expected to be virtually blind for about a month. He said, "I don't have a 'good eye,' but half a good eye."

== Recognition ==
In 2020, Fortune magazine included Crenshaw in its 40 Under 40 in the "Government and Politics" category, writing that he "wears his service to his country on his face."

== Works ==
- Dan Crenshaw (2020). Fortitude: American Resilience in the Era of Outrage. New York: Twelve. ISBN 978-1-5387-3330-1. The National Republican Congressional Committee purchased nearly $400,000 worth of copies of the book.

U.S. House of Representatives
Preceded by Ted Poe	Member of the U.S. House of Representatives from Texas's 2nd congressional district 2019–present	Incumbent
U.S. order of precedence (ceremonial)
Preceded by Angie Craig	United States representatives by seniority 194th	Succeeded by Jason Crow
