= Trent Kelly =

American politician (born 1966)

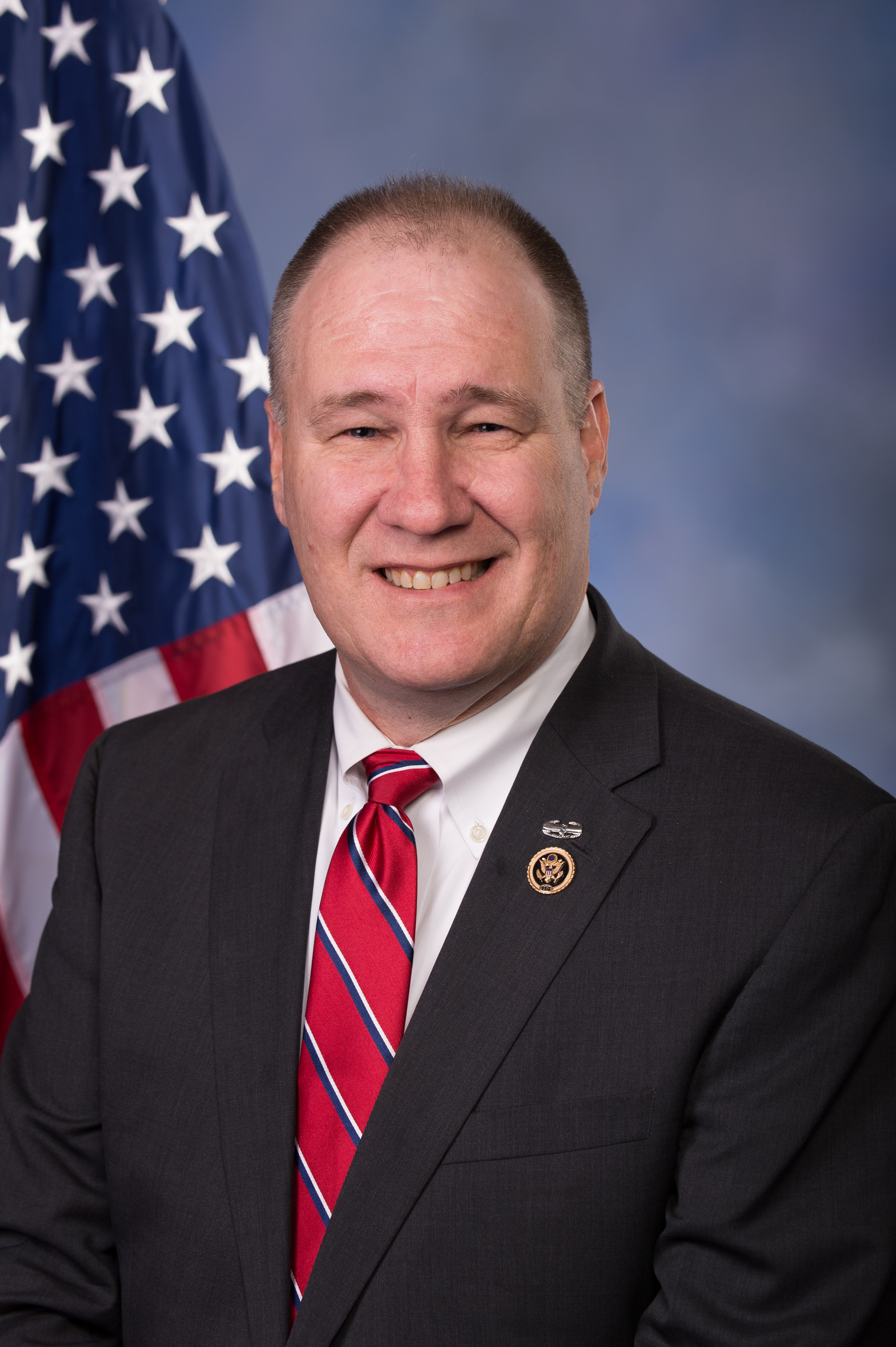
- Official portrait, 2017

Member of the U.S. House of Representatives from Mississippi's 1st district
- Incumbent
- Assumed office June 2, 2015 (Note: Kelly's official service begins on the date of the special election, while he was not sworn in until June 9, 2015.)
- Preceded by: Alan Nunnelee

District Attorney of Mississippi's 1st Judicial District
- In office January 1, 2012 – June 2, 2015
- Preceded by: John Young
- Succeeded by: John Weddle

Personal details
- Born: John Trent Kelly; March 1, 1966 (age 60) Union, Mississippi, U.S.
- Party: Republican
- Spouse: Sheila Kelly
- Children: 3
- Education: East Central Community College (AA); University of Mississippi (BA, JD); United States Army War College (MS)
- Website: House website Campaign website

Military service
- Branch: United States Army
- Years of service: 1985–2025
- Rank: Major General
- Unit: Army National Guard; Mississippi National Guard
- Wars: Gulf War; Iraq War
- Awards: Legion of Merit; Bronze Star Medal (2); Combat Action Badge
- Kelly's voice Kelly supporting the National Guard. Recorded May 12, 2022

John Trent Kelly (born March 1, 1966) is an American lawyer, politician, and retired major general from the Mississippi National Guard serving as the U.S. representative for Mississippi's 1st congressional district since 2015. A member of the Republican Party, he previously served as the district attorney of Mississippi's 1st Judicial District from 2012 to 2015.

== Early life and career ==
John Trent Kelly was born on March 1, 1966, in Union, Mississippi, to John and Barbara Kelly. He is a resident of Saltillo, Mississippi, where he served as the district attorney of Mississippi's 1st Circuit Judicial District, which includes Lee, Pontotoc, Alcorn, Monroe, Itawamba, Prentiss, and Tishomingo Counties.

Kelly graduated from Union High School in 1984 and joined the Mississippi Army National Guard in 1985. He earned an associate's degree from East Central Community College in Decatur before graduating from the University of Mississippi with a bachelor's degree. Kelly is a member of Phi Kappa Tau fraternity.

Kelly graduated from University of Mississippi School of Law and received a master's degree in Strategic Studies from the United States Army War College in 2010.

After law school, Kelly worked in private practice until 1999, when he became a city prosecutor in Tupelo. He was elected district attorney in 2011, defeating a nine-term Democratic incumbent.

== Military service ==
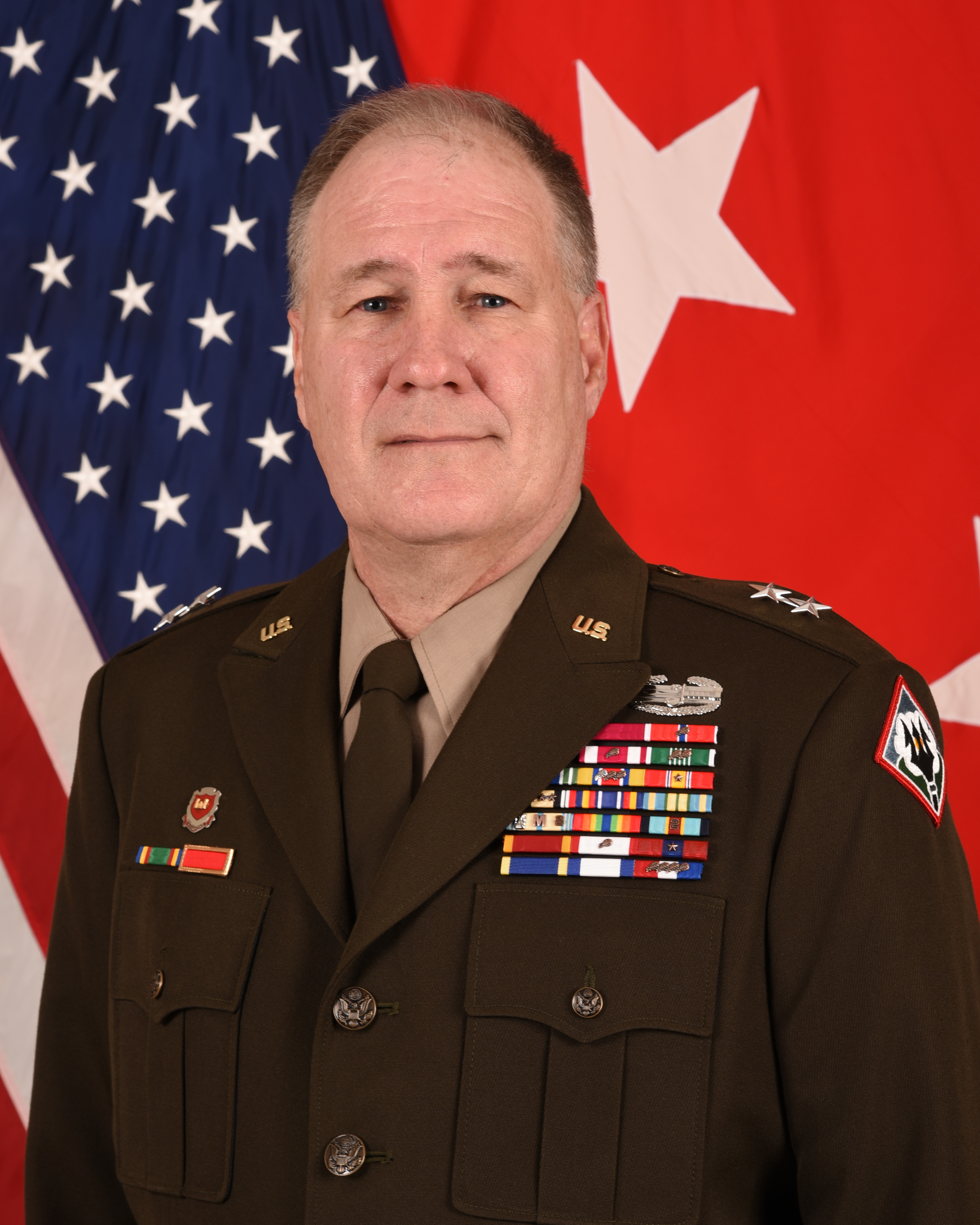
Major General Trent Kelly is the assistant adjutant general – Army, for the Mississippi National Guard.

In 1990, Kelly mobilized for Operation Desert Storm as a second lieutenant engineer officer. In 2005, Kelly deployed as a major during the Iraq War with the 155th Brigade as the Operations Officer of the 150th Engineer Battalion. From 2009 to 2010, he deployed as a lieutenant colonel to Iraq as the Battalion Commander of Task Force Knight of the 155th Brigade Combat Team and commanded over 670 troops from Mississippi, Ohio, and Kentucky. Kelly has received the Soldier's medal, two Bronze Star medals, the Combat Action Badge, the Bronze, Silver, and Gold de Fleury medals, and numerous other federal and state awards for his service. From October 2014 to November 2016, he served as the brigade commander for the 168th Engineer Brigade, leading 1,400 soldiers from the 223rd Engineer Battalion, the 890th Engineer Battalion, and multiple Engineer Specialty Companies from Mississippi. Kelly was promoted to brigadier general in January 2018 and to major general in November 2020. His capstone assignment was as assistant adjutant general - Army, for the Mississippi National Guard; he retired from the Guard in April 2025.

== U.S. House of Representatives ==
=== Elections ===
Mississippi's 1st congressional district: Results 2015–2024
Year	Republican	Votes	Pct	Democratic	Votes	Pct	Third party	Party	Votes	Pct	Third party	Party	Votes	Pct
2015 (special)	Trent Kelly	69,516	70.0%	Walter Zinn	29,831	30.0%								
2016	Trent Kelly	206,455	68.7%	Jacob Owens	83,947	27.9%	Chase Wilson	Libertarian	6,181	2.1%	Cathy Toole	Reform	3,840	1.3%
2018	Trent Kelly	158,245	66.9%	Randy Wadkins	76,601	32.4%	Tracella L.O. Hil	Reform	1,675	0.7%				
2020	Trent Kelly	228,787	68.7%	Antonia Eliason	104,008	31.3%								
2022	Trent Kelly	122,151	73.0%	Dianne Black	45,238	27.0%								
2024	Trent Kelly	223,589	69.8%	Dianne Black	96,697	30.2%								

==== 2015 special election ====
After the death of Republican Congressman Alan Nunnelee in 2015, Kelly entered the race to succeed him. Nunnelee's widow, Tori Nunnelee, contributed to Kelly's campaign.

In the first round, Kelly finished second in a 13-candidate field, behind Democrat Walter Zinn. As no candidate received a majority of votes, Kelly and Zinn advanced to a runoff on June 2. Several of the other candidates in the race endorsed Kelly after they were eliminated.

In the heavily Republican district, Kelly took 70% of the vote to Zinn's 30%.

==== 2016 election ====
Kelly won the Republican primary in March 2016, defeating Paul Clever of Olive Branch both districtwide and in DeSoto County. Kelly had 18,152 votes in DeSoto County, or 80%, to Clever's 4,497 (20%).

Kelly then won reelection with 67.57% of the vote to Democratic nominee Jacob Owens's 27.97%, followed by Libertarian Chase Wilson's 2.92% and Reform Party candidate Cathy L. Toole's 1.45%.

=== Tenure ===
Kelly was sworn in by House Speaker John Boehner on June 9, 2015. In his first term, he served on the House Committee on Agriculture and the House Committee on Small Business.

Kelly serves on the House Armed Services Committee, the House Permanent Select Committee on Intelligence, and the House Agriculture Committee. He has previously served on the House Committee on Small Business and the House Committee on the Budget.

In December 2020, Kelly was one of 126 Republican members of the House of Representatives to sign an amicus brief in support of Texas v. Pennsylvania, a lawsuit filed at the United States Supreme Court contesting the results of the 2020 presidential election, in which Joe Biden defeated incumbent Donald Trump. The Supreme Court declined to hear the case on the basis that Texas lacked standing under Article III of the Constitution to challenge the results of an election held by another state.

In 2024, Kelly voted against the $60 billion military aid package for Ukraine; The Washington Post reported that some of the funding would have supported defense jobs in his constituency.

==== 2017 congressional baseball shooting ====
On June 14, 2017, in Alexandria, Virginia, Republican member of Congress and House Majority Whip Steve Scalise of Louisiana was shot while practicing for the annual Congressional Baseball Game for Charity, scheduled for the following day. Also shot were David Bailey and Crystal Griner, a Capitol Police officer assigned to protect Scalise; Zack Barth, a congressional aide; and Matt Mika, a Tyson Foods lobbyist.

A ten-minute shootout ensued between the shooter—James Hodgkinson of Belleville, Illinois, a left-wing activist—and officers from the Capitol and Alexandria Police. Media reports state Hodgkinson began firing from the fence adjacent to the third base dugout. At the time of the shooting, Kelly was playing third base and roughly ten yards from Hodgkinson. As Hodgkinson opened fire, Kelly is reported to be the first person to be shot at and the first to alert the rest of the team there was an active shooter by yelling "shooter, active shooter" as he evacuated himself from the field. Officers shot Hodgkinson, who died from his wounds later that day at George Washington University Hospital. Scalise and Mika were taken to nearby hospitals, where they underwent surgery. Scalise is the first sitting member of Congress to have been shot since Representative Gabby Giffords was shot in 2011.

=== Committee assignments ===
For the 119th Congress:

- Committee on Agriculture
  - Subcommittee on Forestry and Horticulture
  - Subcommittee on Livestock, Dairy, and Poultry
- Committee on Armed Services
  - Subcommittee on Intelligence and Special Operations
  - Subcommittee on Seapower and Projection Forces (Chairman)
- Permanent Select Committee on Intelligence
  - Subcommittee on Central Intelligence Agency
  - Subcommittee on National Security Agency and Cyber

=== Caucus memberships ===
- National Guard and Reserve Components (co-chair)
- Steel Caucus
- Iraq Caucus (co-chair)
- Caucus on Uzbekistan (co-chair)
- Fertilizer Caucus
- Rural Broadband Caucus
- Crop Insurance Caucus
- Working Forests Caucus
- Rwanda Caucus
- Uzbekistan Caucus

== Honours ==
- Order of Friendship (29 August 2019, Uzbekistan)

U.S. House of Representatives
Preceded by Alan Nunnelee	Member of the U.S. House of Representatives from Mississippi's 1st congressional district 2015–present	Incumbent
U.S. order of precedence (ceremonial)
Preceded by Bruce Westerman	United States representatives by seniority 148th	Succeeded by Darin LaHood
