= Chrissy Houlahan =

American politician (born 1967)

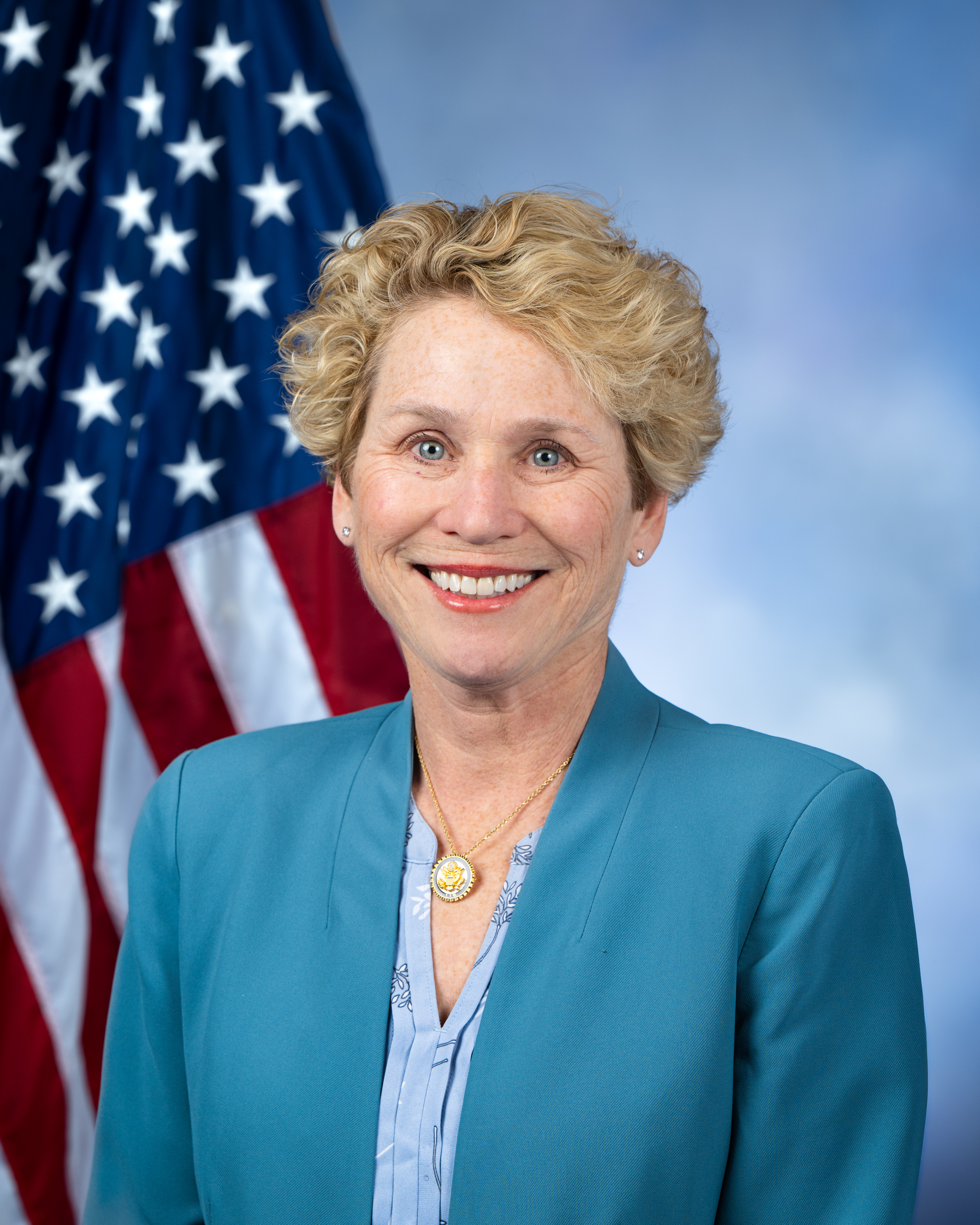
- Official portrait, 2025

Member of the U.S. House of Representatives from Pennsylvania's 6th district
- Incumbent
- Assumed office January 3, 2019
- Preceded by: Ryan Costello

Personal details
- Born: Christina Marie Jampoler; June 5, 1967 (age 59) Naval Air Station Patuxent River, Maryland, U.S.
- Party: Democratic
- Spouse: Bart Houlahan (m. 1991)
- Children: 2
- Education: Stanford University (BS); Massachusetts Institute of Technology (MS)
- Website: House website Campaign website

Military service
- Branch: United States Air Force
- Service years: 1989–1991 (active); 1991–2004 (reserve)
- Rank: Captain
- Unit: Air Force Reserve
- Houlahan's voice Houlahan on the establishment of the Servicewomen and Women Veterans Congressional Caucus. Recorded May 15, 2019

Christina Marie Houlahan (/ˈhuːləhæn/ HOO-lə-hann; née Jampoler; born June 5, 1967) is an American politician, engineer, and former United States Air Force officer. A member of the Democratic Party, she has served as the U.S. representative from Pennsylvania's 6th congressional district since 2019. The district includes almost all of Chester County, a suburban county west of Philadelphia, as well as the southern portion of Berks County including the city of Reading. She was first elected in 2018, defeating Republican Greg McCauley in the midterms.

== Early life and education ==
Houlahan spent her childhood on various U.S. naval bases across the country, including on Oahu. Her father, Andrew C. A. Jampoler, a naval aviator, was born in Lviv, Ukraine, in 1942, to a Jewish family; he and his mother, who also survived the Holocaust, emigrated to the United States when he was four years old. He became a historian and author.

Houlahan, citing her idols as Indiana Jones and Sally Ride, earned her bachelor's degree in engineering from Stanford University in 1989, on an AFROTC scholarship. She then earned a master's degree in Technology and Policy from the Massachusetts Institute of Technology in 1994.

== Earlier career ==
=== Military service ===
After graduation from Stanford University, Houlahan spent three years on United States Air Force active duty at Hanscom Air Force Base in Bedford, Massachusetts. There, she served as a project manager working on air and space defense technologies. She left active duty in 1991 for the Air Force Reserve, separating from the service in 2004 as a captain.

=== Private sector ===
After leaving active duty, Houlahan went to work for the start-up sportswear company AND1 as chief operating officer. As part of the employee benefits program the company offered 40 paid hours of community service at a location of the employee's choosing. Houlahan dedicated her hours to working with girls and women in science, technology, engineering, and math (STEM). Houlahan became chief operating officer of B-Lab, a non-profit start-up, when AND1 was sold.

=== Education career ===
Citing a need to experience the problems in the U.S. educational system first-hand, Houlahan entered a learning program at University of Pennsylvania where she re-took courses in the hard sciences. She enrolled in the Teach for America program and began working as an 11th-grade science teacher at Simon Gratz High School in Philadelphia. She withdrew from the Teach for America program after one year and joined Springboard Collaborative, a Philadelphia-based nonprofit focusing on early childhood literacy in underserved populations nationwide. Houlahan served as both president and CFO/COO of Springboard Collaborative before leaving to focus on her political campaign.

== U.S. House of Representatives ==
=== Elections ===
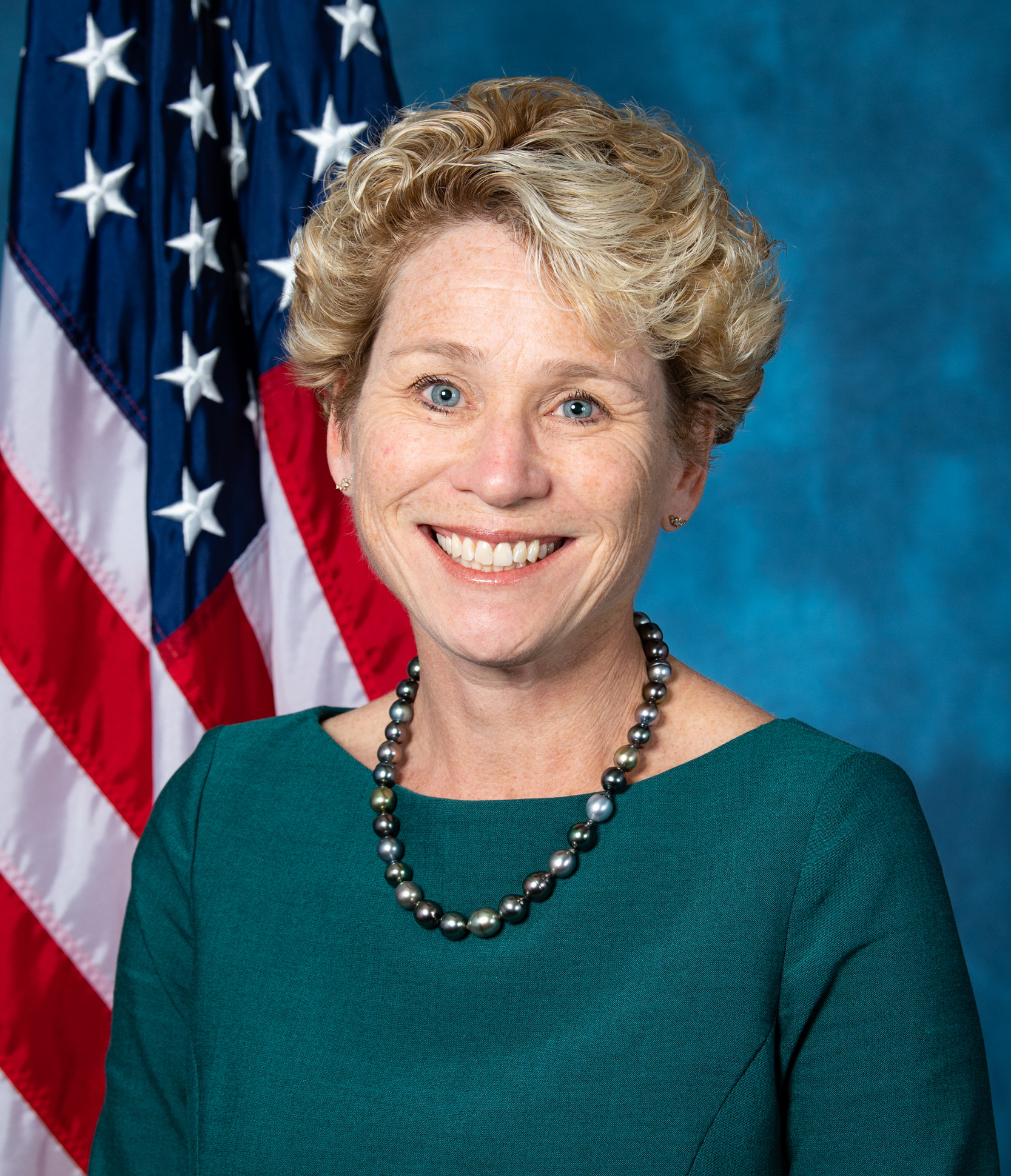
Houlahan during the 116th United States Congress (2018)

==== 2018 ====
Houlahan has said that one of the experiences that motivated her to run for Congress was her organization of a bus trip to the Women's March in Washington, D.C., on January 21, 2017. When asked why she chose to begin her political career by running for Congress and not a lower office, she said, "I don't have time for that. The stakes are too high, and I think I'm qualified."

Houlahan expected to face two-term Republican incumbent Ryan Costello. However, Costello pulled out of the race after the Supreme Court of Pennsylvania threw out Pennsylvania's congressional map as an unconstitutional partisan Republican gerrymander. While Costello was the only incumbent to retain his previous district number, it was made significantly more compact and turned from a Republican-leaning swing district into a strongly Democratic district. It lost its heavily Republican western portion around Lebanon, which had only been connected to the rest of the district by way of a tendril through Berks County. Instead, it now took in almost all of Chester County (except for a sliver around Birmingham Township that was drawn into the neighboring 5th district), along with the heavily Democratic southern portion of Berks County, including Reading.

Houlahan took the Democratic nomination unopposed and faced first-time candidate Greg McCauley in the general election. On November 6, 2018, Houlahan easily defeated McCauley, garnering 58.8% of the vote over McCauley's 41.1%. Houlahan was one of seven Pennsylvania women running for the U.S. House of Representatives in 2018, and one of four Democratic women to win, along with Mary Gay Scanlon, Madeleine Dean and Susan Wild. She joined two other female military veterans in the House freshman class, former naval officers Elaine Luria and Mikie Sherrill.

Upon taking office in January 2019, Houlahan became the first Democrat to represent a Chester County-based district since before the Civil War (1857). The county had historically favored Republicans but became increasingly Democratic in the years preceding Houlahan's election.

Houlahan ran on a platform that included healthcare, job creation, and campaign finance reform. Other campaign issues she identified included education, family issues, and veteran's issues. Houlahan raised nearly $5 million during her 2018 campaign. She was also endorsed by many organizations, including Emily's List, Human Rights Campaign, Giffords Law Center to Prevent Gun Violence, Project 100, Vote Vets, the Service Employees International Union-PA (SEIU PA) and several other unions.

==== 2020 ====
Houlahan ran for re-election in 2020 against Republican John Emmons. She was reelected with over 56% of the vote.

==== 2022 ====
Houlahan had publicly expressed interest in a 2022 campaign for the United States Senate, but on June 8, she announced she would run for reelection to the House. After an uncontested primary, she ran against Republican Guy Ciarrocchi in the general election, winning reelection with over 58% of the vote.

==== 2024 ====
Houlahan ran unopposed in the 2024 Democratic primary and won reelection against Republican Neil Young Jr. with 56% of the vote.

=== Tenure ===
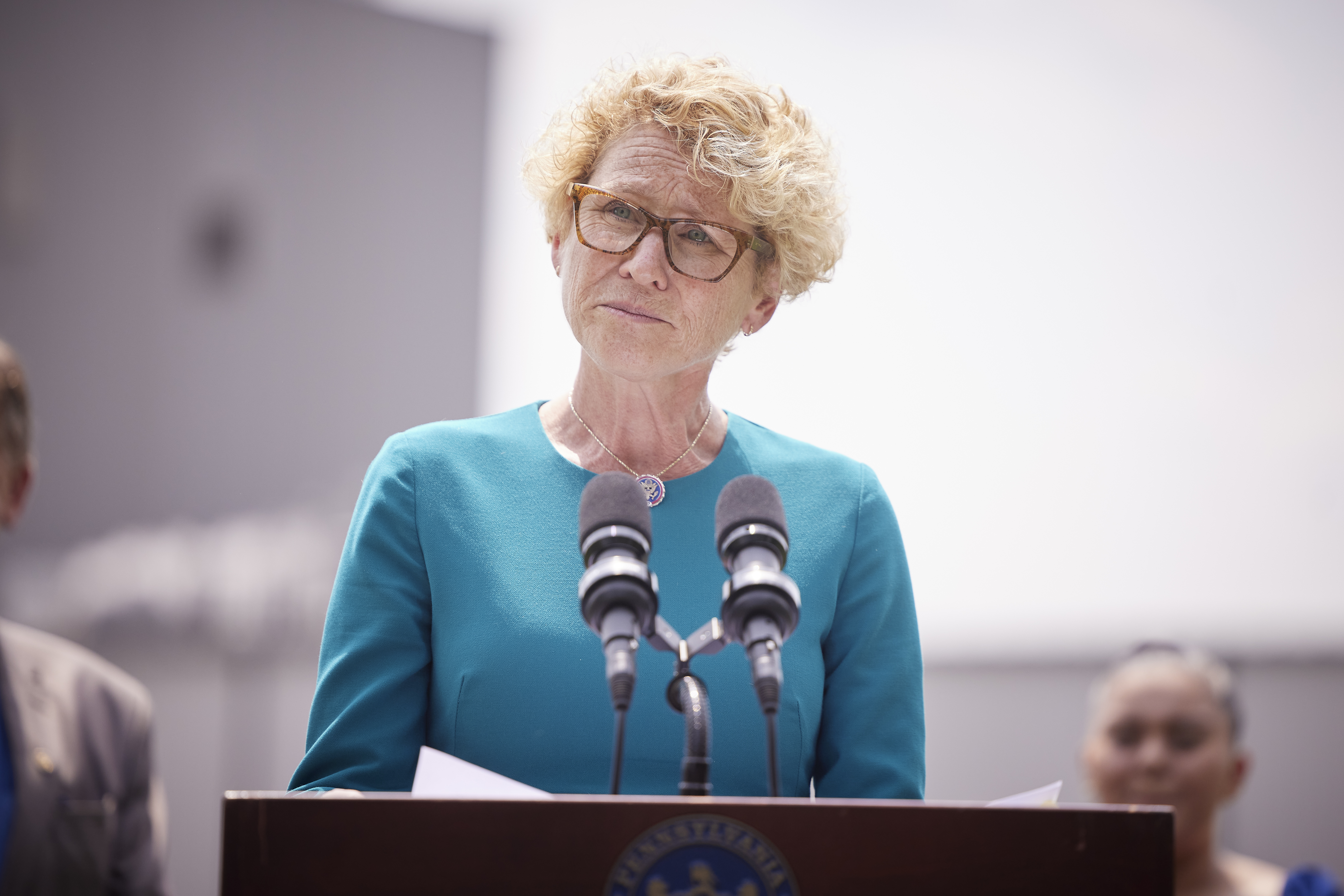
Houlahan in 2022

On July 29, 2024, Houlahan was announced as one of six Democratic members of a bipartisan task force investigating the attempted assassination of Donald Trump.

On March 6, 2025, Houlahan was one of ten Democrats in Congress who joined all of their Republican colleagues in voting to censure Democratic congressman Al Green for interrupting President Donald Trump's State of the Union Address.

In November 2025, Houlahan was one of six Democratic lawmakers to be part of a video telling servicemembers they can refuse illegal orders. In response the following day, President Trump posted on social media calling those in the video, including Houlahan, traitors who should be charged with sedition punishable by death, and shared a social media post calling for them to be hanged.

=== Political positions ===
==== Foreign policy ====
In January 2019, she said she opposed withdrawing US troops from Syria.

During the Russo-Ukrainian War, Houlahan signed a letter advocating for President Biden to give F-16 fighter jets to Ukraine.

During the Gaza war, Houlahan signed a letter expressing concern over Israeli Prime Minister Benjamin Netanyahu's conduct of the war and the humanitarian crisis in Gaza. It called for President Biden to further pressure the Israeli government to adjust their strategy regarding the war.

In September 2025, Houlahan visited China as part of a bipartisan delegation, where he met Premier Li Qiang, Foreign Minister Wang Yi, Defense Minister Dong Jun and other high-ranking Chinese officials.

==== Healthcare ====
Houlahan supports the government negotiating drug prices with pharmaceutical companies and a public option, but opposes a single payer healthcare system.

==== LGBT rights ====
She supports same-sex marriage, the Equality Act. In 2019, she opposed President Trump's memorandum banning transgender individuals from the military.

==== Market regulations ====
In 2022, Houlahan was one of 16 Democrats to vote against the Merger Filing Fee Modernization Act of 2022, an antitrust package that would crack down on corporations for anti-competitive behavior.

==== National security ====
Houlahan believes that critical and emerging technology leadership is a core component of U.S. national security, citing biotechnology as a priority for research and development. She has also focused on shoring up critical materials and resources, like transformers, and believes that American small businesses focused on critical and emerging technologies should have streamlined access to federal programs.

=== Caucus memberships ===
- Black Maternal Health Caucus
- Climate Solutions Caucus
- Servicewomen and Female Veterans Caucus (Co-Chair)
- Women in STEM Caucus
- For Country Caucus
- New Democrat Coalition
- Honor and Civility Caucus
- Congressional National Service Caucus
- Veterans' Education Caucus
- Congressional LGBTQ+ Equality Caucus
- Sustainable Energy & Environment Coalition
- Problem Solvers Caucus

=== Committee assignments ===
==== 117th Congress ====
- Committee on Armed Services
  - Subcommittee on Intelligence, Emerging Threats and Capabilities
  - United States House Armed Services Subcommittee on Readiness
- Committee on Foreign Affairs
  - Subcommittee on Africa, Global Health, Global Human Rights and International Organizations
  - Subcommittee on Asia, the Pacific and Nonproliferation
- Committee on Small Business

==== 118th Congress ====
- Committee on Armed Services
  - Subcommittee on Military Personnel
  - Subcommittee on Strategic Forces
- Permanent Select Committee on Intelligence
  - Defense Intelligence and Overhead Architecture – Ranking member

== Electoral history ==
Pennsylvania's 6th congressional district, 2018
Party	Candidate	Votes	%
Democratic	Chrissy Houlahan	177,704	58.9
Republican	Greg McCauley	124,124	41.1
Total votes		301,828	100.0
Democratic gain from Republican			

Pennsylvania's 6th congressional district, 2020
Party	Candidate	Votes	%
Democratic	Chrissy Houlahan (incumbent)	226,440	56.05
Republican	John Emmons	177,526	43.95
Total votes		403,966	100.0
Democratic hold			

Pennsylvania's 6th congressional district, 2022
Party	Candidate	Votes	%
Democratic	Chrissy Houlahan (incumbent)	190,386	58.3
Republican	Guy Ciarrocchi	136,097	41.7
Total votes		326,483	100.0
Democratic hold			

Pennsylvania's 6th congressional district, 2024
Party	Candidate	Votes	%
Democratic	Chrissy Houlahan (incumbent)	235,625	56.2
Republican	Neil Young Jr.	183,638	43.8
Total votes		419,263	100.0
Democratic hold			

== Personal life ==
Houlahan lives in Devon, Pennsylvania, with her husband Bart, whom she met at Stanford and married in 1991. The couple has two adult daughters.

== See also ==
- Women in the United States House of Representatives

U.S. House of Representatives
Preceded by Ryan Costello	Member of the U.S. House of Representatives from Pennsylvania's 6th congressional district 2019–present	Incumbent
U.S. order of precedence (ceremonial)
Preceded by Jahana Hayes	United States representatives by seniority 208th	Succeeded by Dusty Johnson
