= United States House Armed Services Subcommittee on Intelligence and Special Operations =

Subcommittee of the U.S. House Armed Services Committee

Subcommittee of Committee on Armed Services
- Active United States House of Representatives; 119th Congress

Leadership
- Chair: Ronny Jackson (R)
- Ranking Member: Jason Crow (D)

Structure
- Seats: 16 (16 currently filled) 9/9 7/7
- Political parties: Majority (9): Republican (9); Minority (7): Democratic (7)

Meeting place
- 2216, Rayburn House Office Building; Washington, D.C. 20515

Phone number
- (202)-225-4151

The Subcommittee on Intelligence and Special Operations is a subcommittee of the House Armed Services Committee in the U.S. House of Representatives. During the 112th Congress, it was known as the Subcommittee on Emerging Threats and Capabilities, and before that as the Subcommittee on Terrorism, Unconventional Threats and Capabilities. From the 113th–116th Congresses it was named the Subcommittee on Intelligence, Emerging Threats and Capabilities

The chair of the subcommittee is Republican Ronny Jackson of Texas, and the Ranking Member is Democrat Jason Crow of Colorado.

== Jurisdiction ==
According to the Subcommittee's website, it has jurisdiction over the following areas:

- Department of Defense policy and programs and accounts related to:
  - military intelligence,
  - national intelligence,
  - countering weapons of mass destruction,
  - counter-proliferation,
  - counter-terrorism,
  - other sensitive military operations,
  - special operations forces,
  - information operations policy and military information support operations, and
  - security cooperation.

== Members, 119th Congress ==
| Majority | Minority |
|---|---|
| Ronny Jackson, Texas, Chair; Austin Scott, Georgia; Trent Kelly, Mississippi; Nancy Mace, South Carolina; Morgan Luttrell, Texas; Cory Mills, Florida; Derrick Van Orden, Wisconsin; Pat Harrigan, North Carolina; Abraham Hamadeh, Arizona | Jason Crow, Colorado, Ranking Member; Bill Keating, Massachusetts; Jared Golden, Maine; Sara Jacobs, California; Pat Ryan, New York; Gil Cisneros, California; Derek Tran, California |
Ex officio
| Mike Rogers, Alabama | Adam Smith, Washington |

== Historical membership rosters ==
=== 118th Congress ===
| Majority | Minority |
|---|---|
| Jack Bergman, Michigan, Chair; Austin Scott, Georgia; Elise Stefanik, New York; Trent Kelly, Mississippi; Ronny Jackson, Texas; Nancy Mace, South Carolina; Morgan Luttrell, Texas; Cory Mills, Florida | Ruben Gallego, Arizona, Ranking Member; Bill Keating, Massachusetts; Jason Crow, Colorado; Elissa Slotkin, Michigan; Sara Jacobs, California; Jeff Jackson, North Carolina; Jimmy Panetta, California |
Ex officio
| Mike Rogers, Alabama | Adam Smith, Washington |

=== 115th Congress ===
| Majority | Minority |
|---|---|
| Elise Stefanik, New York, Chairwoman; Bill Shuster, Pennsylvania; Brad Wenstrup, Ohio; Ralph Abraham, Louisiana; Liz Cheney, Wyoming; Joe Wilson, South Carolina; Frank LoBiondo, New Jersey; Trent Franks, Arizona, until 2018; Debbie Lesko, Arizona, from 2018; Doug Lamborn, Colorado; Austin Scott, Georgia | James Langevin, Rhode Island, Ranking Member; Rick Larsen, Washington; Jim Cooper, Tennessee; Jackie Speier, California; Mark Veasey, Texas; Tulsi Gabbard, Hawaii; Beto O'Rourke, Texas; Stephanie Murphy, Florida |
Ex officio
| Mac Thornberry, Texas | Adam Smith, Washington |

=== 116th Congress ===
| Majority | Minority |
|---|---|
| James Langevin, Rhode Island, Chair; Rick Larsen, Washington; Jim Cooper, Tennessee; Tulsi Gabbard, Hawaii; Anthony Brown, Maryland; Ro Khanna, California; Bill Keating, Massachusetts; Andy Kim, New Jersey; Chrissy Houlahan, Pennsylvania; Jason Crow, Colorado; Elissa Slotkin, Michigan; Lori Trahan, Massachusetts | Elise Stefanik, New York, Ranking Member; Sam Graves, Missouri; Ralph Abraham, Louisiana; Mike Conaway, Texas; Austin Scott, Georgia; Scott DesJarlais, Tennessee; Mike Gallagher, Wisconsin; Mike Waltz, Florida; Don Bacon, Nebraska; Jim Banks, Indiana |
Ex officio
| Adam Smith, Washington | Mac Thornberry, Texas |

=== 117th Congress ===
| Majority | Minority |
|---|---|
| Ruben Gallego, Arizona, Chair; Stephanie Murphy, Florida, Vice Chair; Rick Larsen, Washington; Jim Cooper, Tennessee; Bill Keating, Massachusetts; Filemon Vela, Texas; Mikie Sherrill, New Jersey; Jimmy Panetta, California; Sylvia Garcia, Texas | Trent Kelly, Mississippi, Ranking Member; Austin Scott, Georgia; Sam Graves, Missouri; Don Bacon, Nebraska; Liz Cheney, Wyoming; Mike Waltz, Florida; Scott Franklin, Florida |
Ex officio
| Adam Smith, Washington | Mike Rogers, Alabama |

== See also ==
- United States Senate Armed Services Subcommittee on Emerging Threats and Capabilities
