= United States House Intelligence Subcommittee on National Intelligence Enterprise =

United States House Intelligence subcommittee

Permanent select subcommittee of Permanent Select Committee on Intelligence
- Active United States House of Representatives; 119th Congress

Leadership
- Chair: Austin Scott (R)
- Ranking Member: Raja Krishnamoorthi (D)

Structure
- Seats: 10 (10 currently filled) 6/6 4/4
- Political parties: Majority (6): Republican (6); Minority (4): Democratic (4)

Meeting place
- HVC304, The Capitol; Washington, D.C. 20515

Phone number
- (202)-225-4121

The House Intelligence Subcommittee on Counterterrorism, Counterintelligence and Counterproliferation is one of the four subcommittees within the Permanent Select Committee on Intelligence through the 117th United States Congress. It is sometimes referred to as the "C3" subcommittee as a nickname.

Prior to the 116th Congress, it was known as the Subcommittee on Emerging Threats.

== Members, 117th Congress ==
Majority	Minority
André Carson, Indiana, Chair; Jackie Speier, California; Mike Quigley, Illinois; Joaquin Castro, Texas; Peter Welch, Vermont; Sean Patrick Maloney, New York	Rick Crawford, Arkansas, Ranking Member; Brad Wenstrup, Ohio; Chris Stewart, Utah; TBD
Ex officio
Adam Schiff, California	Devin Nunes, California
