= United States House Intelligence Subcommittee on National Security Agency and Cyber =

Permanent select subcommittee of Permanent Select Committee on Intelligence
- Active United States House of Representatives; 119th Congress

Leadership
- Chair: Darin LaHood (R)
- Ranking Member: Josh Gottheimer (D)

Structure
- Seats: 10 (10 currently filled) 6/6 4/4
- Political parties: Majority (6): Republican (6); Minority (4): Democratic (4)

Meeting place
- HVC304, The Capitol; Washington, D.C. 20515

Phone number
- (202)-225-4121

The House Intelligence Subcommittee on Strategic Technologies and Advanced Research is one of the four subcommittees within the Permanent Select Committee on Intelligence. It is sometimes referred to by its nickname, the "STAR" subcommittee.

Prior to the 116th Congress, it was known as the Subcommittee on the NSA and Cybersecurity.

== Members, 117th Congress ==
Majority	Minority
Jim Himes, Connecticut, Chair; Andre Carson, Indiana; Mike Quigley, Illinois; Eric Swalwell, California; Andre Carson, Indiana; Raja Krishnamoorthi, Illinois; TBD	TBD
Ex officio
Adam Schiff, California	Devin Nunes, California
