= Jason Crow =

American lawyer and politician (born 1979)

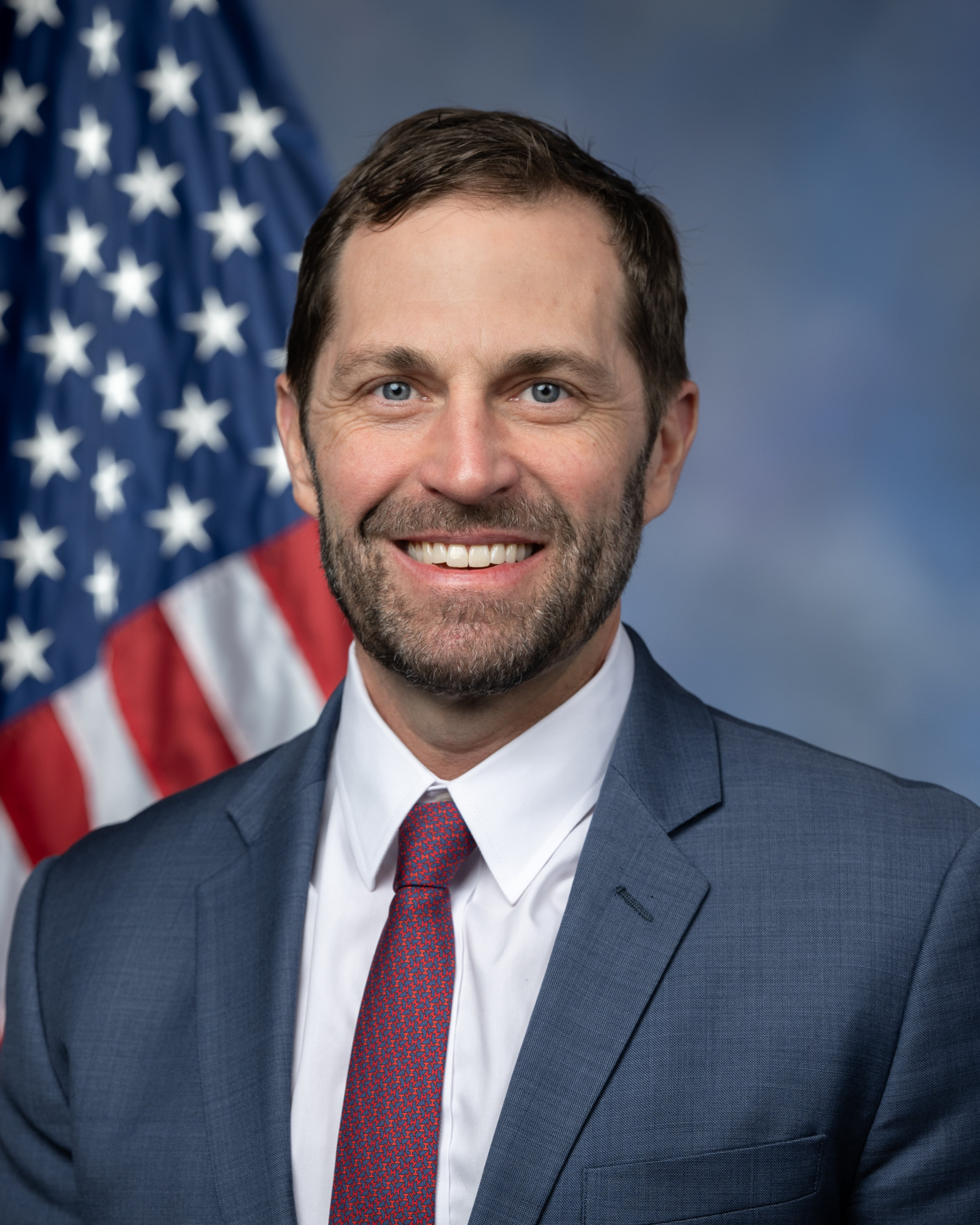
- Official portrait, 2025

Member of the U.S. House of Representatives from Colorado's 6th district
- Incumbent
- Assumed office January 3, 2019
- Preceded by: Mike Coffman

Personal details
- Born: March 15, 1979 (age 47) Madison, Wisconsin, U.S.
- Party: Democratic
- Spouse: Deserai Anderson (m. 2005; div. 2023)
- Children: 2
- Education: University of Wisconsin, Madison (BA); University of Denver (JD)
- Website: House website Campaign website

Military service
- Branch/service: United States Army
- Years of service: 2002–2006
- Rank: Captain
- Unit: 82nd Airborne Division; 75th Ranger Regiment
- Battles/wars: Iraq War; War in Afghanistan
- Awards: Bronze Star Medal
- Crow's voice Crow on Afghan refugees. Recorded July 22, 2021

Jason Crow (born March 15, 1979) is an American politician, lawyer, and former U.S. Army officer serving since 2019 as the United States representative for Colorado's 6th congressional district. Crow is the first member of the Democratic Party to represent the district, which includes Aurora, Littleton, Centennial, and other portions of the inner eastern and southern Denver metro area.

== Early life and career ==
Crow was born in Madison, Wisconsin, in 1979. He earned a Bachelor of Arts degree from the University of Wisconsin–Madison in 2002, and a Juris Doctor from the University of Denver Sturm College of Law in 2009.

Crow is a former Army Ranger. He completed three tours of duty in Iraq and Afghanistan as part of the 82nd Airborne Division and 75th Ranger Regiment. In 2003, he led an 82nd Airborne platoon into combat during the Battle of Samawah. He was awarded the Bronze Star Medal for his service in Iraq. From 2009 to 2014, Crow served on the Colorado Board of Veterans Affairs. After his military service, he became a partner at the law firm Holland and Hart. In 2015, he received the University of Denver's Ammi Hyde Award for Recent Graduate Achievement.

== U.S. House of Representatives ==
=== Elections ===
==== 2018 ====
On April 17, 2017, Crow announced his intention to run against four-term Republican incumbent Mike Coffman to represent Colorado's 6th congressional district in the United States House of Representatives.

In the Democratic primary, Crow defeated businessman Levi Tillemann with 68% of the vote. He defeated Coffman in the November 6 general election with 54% of the vote, winning two of the district's three counties. He is the first Democrat to represent the district since its creation in 1983.

==== 2020 ====
Crow ran for election to a second term, and faced no opposition in the Democratic primary. He defeated Steve House, former chairman of the Colorado Republican Party, in the November 3 general election by over 17% of the vote, winning all three counties.

==== 2022 ====
Crow defeated moderate Republican Steve Monahan to win his third term, with 61% of the vote. A redistricting change gave Crow a significant advantage over Monahan, drawing in more urban areas that made the district more Democratic than its predecessor. It now took in most of the more built-up areas in Arapahoe and Adams counties, including all of Aurora and Littleton, as well as a sliver of Denver itself.

=== Tenure ===
Crow has been the primary sponsor of 10 bills, most relating to military or foreign affairs. For 2022, GovTrack ranked him as the "15th most politically right" Democrat in the House of Representatives, putting him at the 93rd percentile.

During the January 6 United States Capitol attack, Crow was one of a group of representatives who were trapped in the Capitol after the rest of the House had been evacuated. He described going "back into ... combat mode" during the attack, preparing to defend himself and the other representatives. Crow held distressed Representative Susan Wild's hand, as captured in a photo that went viral.

Crow was an impeachment manager for President Donald Trump's first impeachment trial.

On July 29, 2024, Crow was announced as one of six Democratic members of a bipartisan task force investigating the attempted assassination of Donald Trump.

In May 2025, a pro-Palestinian protest was held in Denver against Crow for repeatedly accepting campaign donations from executives of Palantir Technologies, which provides intelligence and surveillance services to the Israel Defense Forces (IDF) in the Gaza war.

In November 2025, Crow was one of six people, all Democratic lawmakers, to be part of a video telling servicemembers they can refuse illegal orders. In response later that month, President Trump posted on social media calling those in the video, including Crow, traitors who should be charged with sedition punishable by death, and shared a social media post calling for them to be hanged.

Crow had stopped accepting Palantir donations around May of 2025 following criticisms of ICE surveillance contracts being made by the company. And after an inquiry from The Colorado Sun in February of 2026, Crow and fellow Democratic Senator of Colorado, John Hickenlooper, pledged to donate Palantir-linked donations in an attempt to redirect said donations to immigrants rights groups in Colorado.

=== Committee assignments ===
For the 118th Congress:

- Committee on Foreign Affairs
  - Subcommittee on Oversight and Accountability (Ranking Member)
- Permanent Select Committee on Intelligence
  - Subcommittee on Central Intelligence Agency
  - Subcommittee on Department of Defense Intelligence and Overhead Architecture

For the 119th Congress:

- Committee on Armed Services
  - Subcommittee on Cyber, Information Technologies, and Innovation
  - Subcommittee on Intelligence and Special Operations (Ranking Member)
- Permanent Select Committee on Intelligence
  - Subcommittee on Central Intelligence Agency
  - Subcommittee on Open-Source Intelligence

=== Caucus memberships ===
- Black Maternal Health Caucus
- Congressional Equality Caucus
- New Democrat Coalition
- Congressional Ukraine Caucus
- For Country Caucus
- Rare Disease Caucus

== Political positions ==
Crow voted with President Joe Biden's stated position 100% of the time in the 117th Congress, according to a FiveThirtyEight analysis.

=== Abortion ===
Crow supports abortion rights.

=== Foreign policy ===
During the Russo-Ukrainian War, Crow signed a letter advocating for President Biden to give F-16 fighter jets to Ukraine.

Crow voted in favor of a House resolution to show solidarity with Israel following the 2023 Hamas attack on Israel. In 2026, he voted for an amendment by Thomas Massie to a State Department appropriations bill to eliminate all regularly appropriated US aid to Israel.

=== Gun control ===
Crow voiced support for gun control reform while campaigning for the House of Representatives. On February 28, 2019, he voted for the Bipartisan Background Checks Act (H.R.8) after cosponsoring the bill. H.R.8, if passed, would have required unlicensed gun sellers to conduct background checks on gun buyers. Crow was also a cosponsor of the Assault Weapon Ban Act (H.R.1296), which would have limited access to guns that are considered assault weapons.

=== Impeachment ===
On September 23, 2019, Crow was one of seven freshman lawmakers with national security backgrounds who co-wrote an opinion essay in The Washington Post voicing their support for an impeachment inquiry against Donald Trump. In interviews, Crow said it was important that "the inquiry stay focused and proceed efficiently". On January 15, 2020, he was selected as one of seven impeachment managers who presented the impeachment case against Trump during Trump's first impeachment trial before the United States Senate.

=== LGBT rights ===
Crow supports same-sex marriage and the expansion of LGBT non-discrimination laws. He supported President Barack Obama's repeal of Don't ask, don't tell at the 2012 Democratic National Convention. He opposed President Trump's transgender military ban, cosponsoring an amendment to the 2020 National Defense Authorization Act to overturn the ban. In 2021, he supported the Equality Act.

=== Special interests ===
Crow refused corporate PAC money during his campaign. He is a sponsor of the For the People Act of 2019, which would end gerrymandering and create automatic voter registration. The bill would also prevent members of Congress from serving on corporate boards. It also seeks to eliminate dark money contributions.

In June 2020, Jason Crow responded to Trump's threat to deploy the military against protesters by calling it "a threat to use the military against the people" and "an unacceptable action", emphasizing the need to uphold democratic values.

== Electoral history ==
Democratic primary results, Colorado 2018
Party	Candidate	Votes	%
Democratic	Jason Crow	49,851	65.93%
Democratic	Levi Tillemann	25,757	34.07%
Total votes		75,608	100%

Colorado's 6th congressional district results, 2018
Party	Candidate	Votes	%
Democratic	Jason Crow	187,639	54.10%
Republican	Mike Coffman (incumbent)	148,685	42.87%
Libertarian	Kat Martin	5,886	1.70%
Independent	Dan Chapin	4,607	1.33%
Write-in		5	<0.01%
Total votes		346,822	100%
Democratic gain from Republican			

Colorado's 6th congressional district results, 2020
Party	Candidate	Votes	%
Democratic	Jason Crow (incumbent)	250,314	57.09%
Republican	Steve House	175,192	40.00%
Libertarian	Norm Olsen	9,083	2.07%
Unity	Jaimie Kulikowski	3,884	0.89%
Total votes		438,473	100%
Democratic hold			

Colorado's 6th congressional district results, 2022
Party	Candidate	Votes	%
Democratic	Jason Crow (incumbent)	170,140	60.60%
Republican	Steve Monahan	105,084	37.43%
Libertarian	Eric Mulder	5,531	1.97%
Total votes		280,755	100%
Democratic hold			

Colorado's 6th congressional district results, 2024
Party	Candidate	Votes	%
Democratic	Jason Crow (incumbent)	202,686	58.97%
Republican	John Fabbricatore	132,174	38.45%
Libertarian	John Kittleson	4,832	1.41%
Approval Voting	Travis Nicks	4,004	1.16%
Write-in		25	0.01%
Total votes		343,721	100%
Democratic hold			

== Personal life ==
Crow and his former wife, Deserai (née Anderson), have two children, one of whom is named Josephine, the other of whom is named Ralph.

== See also ==
- Bibliography of Colorado
- Geography of Colorado
- History of Colorado
- Index of Colorado-related articles
- List of Colorado-related lists
- Outline of Colorado

U.S. House of Representatives
Preceded by Mike Coffman	Member of the U.S. House of Representatives from Colorado's 6th congressional district 2019–present	Incumbent
New office	Ranking Member of the House Trump Assassination Attempt Task Force; 2024–2025	Position abolished
U.S. order of precedence (ceremonial)
Preceded by Dan Crenshaw	United States representatives by seniority 195th	Succeeded by Sharice Davids
