= United States House Intelligence Subcommittee on Central Intelligence Agency =

Permanent select subcommittee of Permanent Select Committee on Intelligence
- Active United States House of Representatives; 119th Congress

Leadership
- Chair: Brian Fitzpatrick (R)
- Ranking Member: Jimmy Gomez (D)

Structure
- Seats: 10 (10 currently filled) 6/6 4/4
- Political parties: Majority (6): Republican (6); Minority (4): Democratic (4)

Meeting place
- HVC304, The Capitol; Washington, D.C. 20515

Phone number
- (202)-225-4121

The House Intelligence Subcommittee on the Central Intelligence Agency is one of five subcommittees within the Permanent Select Committee on Intelligence.

In the 116th and 117th Congresses, it was known as the Subcommittee on Intelligence Modernization and Readiness.

== Members, 118th Congress ==
Minority	Majority
Rick Crawford, Arkansas, Chair; Elise Stefanik, New York; Mike Gallagher, Wisconsin; Austin Scott, Georgia; Dan Crenshaw, Texas; Mike Waltz, Florida	André Carson, Indiana, Ranking Member; Joaquin Castro, Texas; Raja Krishnamoorthi, Illinois; Jason Crow, Colorado
Ex officio
Mike Turner, California	Jim Himes, Connecticut
