= Vindman =

Vindman is a surname. Notable people with the surname include:

- Alex Vindman (born 1975), Ukrainian-born American retired U.S. Army lieutenant colonel; brother of Eugene
- Eugene Vindman (born 1975), Ukrainian-born American politician and retired U.S. Army colonel; brother of Alex
