= United States House Armed Services Subcommittee on Military Personnel =

United States Congress subcommittee

Subcommittee of Committee on Armed Services
- Active United States House of Representatives; 119th Congress

Leadership
- Chair: Pat Fallon (R)
- Ranking Member: Chrissy Houlahan (D)

Structure
- Seats: 14 (14 currently filled) 8/8 6/6
- Political parties: Majority (8): Republican (8); Minority (6): Democratic (6)

Meeting place
- 2216, Rayburn House Office Building; Washington, D.C. 20515

Phone number
- (202)-225-4151

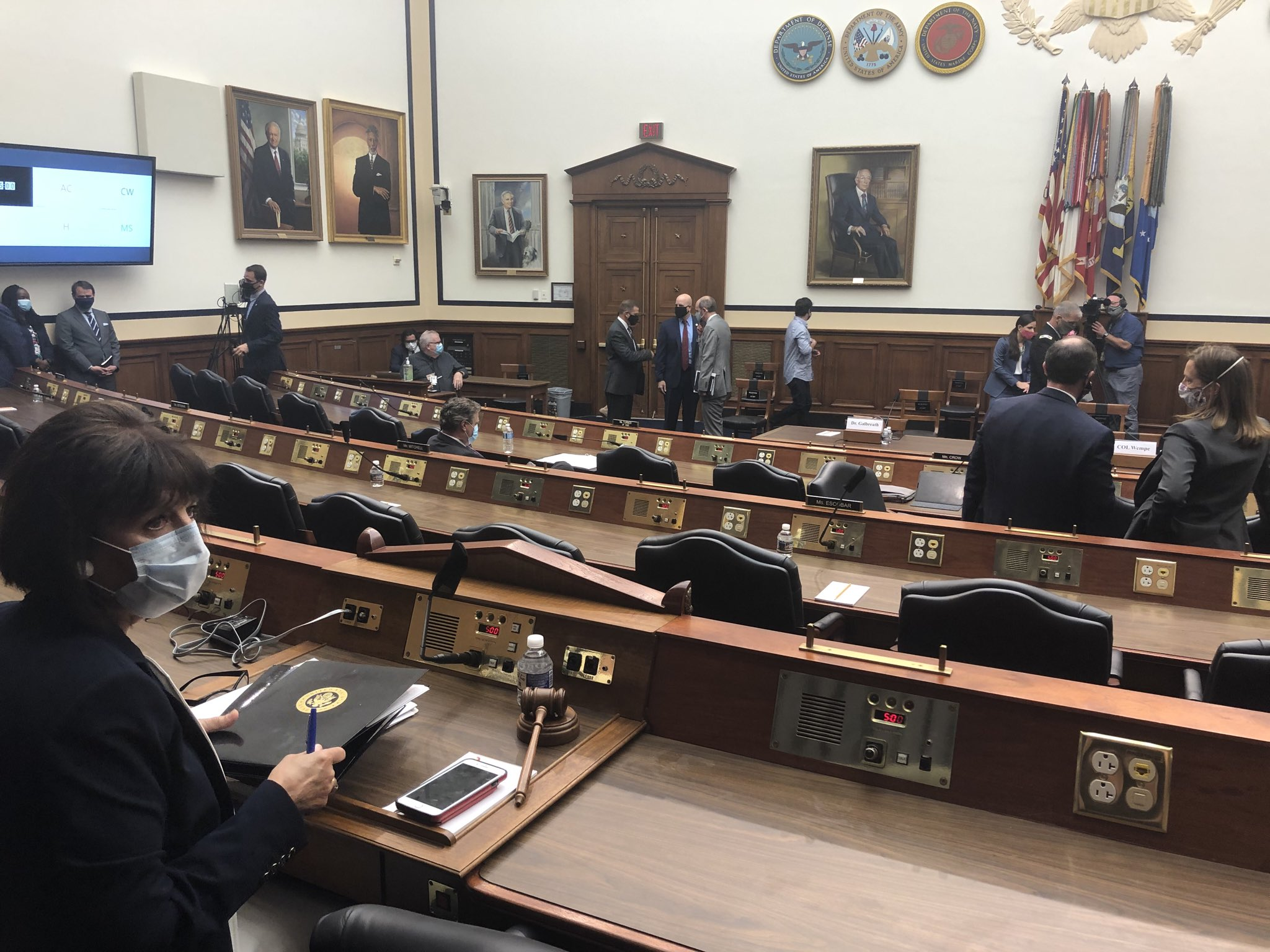
Subcommittee meeting, as chaired by Jackie Speier, in 2020.

House Armed Services Subcommittee on Military Personnel is a subcommittee of the House Armed Services Committee in the United States House of Representatives.

It is currently Chaired by Republican Pat Fallon of Texas and its Ranking Member is Democrat Chrissy Houlahan of Pennsylvania.

== Jurisdiction ==
The Military Personnel Subcommittee exercises oversight and legislative jurisdiction over:

1. Military personnel policy
2. Reserve component integration and employment issues
3. Military health care
4. Military education
5. POW/MIA issues
6. Morale, Welfare and Recreation issues and programs

== Members, 119th Congress ==
Majority	Minority
Pat Fallon, Texas, Chair; Elise Stefanik, New York; Nancy Mace, South Carolina; Jen Kiggans, Virginia; Cory Mills, Florida; Pat Harrigan, North Carolina; Derek Schmidt, Kansas; Jeff Crank, Colorado	Chrissy Houlahan, Pennsylvania, Ranking Member; Sara Jacobs, California; Marilyn Strickland, Washington; Jill Tokuda, Hawaii; Gil Cisneros, California; Maggie Goodlander, New Hampshire
Ex officio
Mike Rogers, Alabama	Adam Smith, Washington

== Historical membership rosters ==
=== 118th Congress ===
Majority	Minority
Jim Banks, Indiana, Chair; Elise Stefanik, New York; Matt Gaetz, Florida; Jack Bergman, Michigan; Mike Waltz, Florida; Brad Finstad, Minnesota; James Moylan, Guam; Mark Alford, Missouri; Cory Mills, Florida	Andy Kim, New Jersey, Ranking Member; Chrissy Houlahan, Pennsylvania; Veronica Escobar, Texas; Sara Jacobs, California; Marilyn Strickland, Washington; Jill Tokuda, Hawaii; Don Davis, North Carolina; Terri Sewell, Alabama; Steven Horsford, Nevada
Ex officio
Mike Rogers, Alabama	Adam Smith, Washington

=== 115th Congress ===
Majority	Minority
Mike Coffman, Colorado, Chairman; Walter B. Jones, North Carolina; Brad Wenstrup, Ohio; Steve Russell, Oklahoma; Don Bacon, Nebraska; Martha McSally, Arizona; Ralph Abraham, Louisiana; Trent Kelly, Mississippi	Jackie Speier, California, Ranking Member; Bob Brady, Pennsylvania; Niki Tsongas, Massachusetts; Ruben Gallego, Arizona; Carol Shea-Porter, New Hampshire
Ex officio
Mac Thornberry, Texas	Adam Smith, Washington

=== 116th Congress ===
Majority	Minority
Jackie Speier, California, Chair; Susan Davis, California; Ruben Gallego, Arizona; Gil Cisneros, California; Veronica Escobar, Texas; Deb Haaland, New Mexico; Lori Trahan, Massachusetts; Elaine Luria, Virginia	Trent Kelly, Mississippi, Ranking Member; Ralph Abraham, Louisiana; Liz Cheney, Wyoming; Paul Mitchell, Michigan; Jack Bergman, Michigan; Matt Gaetz, Florida
Ex officio
Adam Smith, Washington	Mac Thornberry, Texas

=== 117th Congress ===
Majority	Minority
Jackie Speier, California, Chair; Andy Kim, New Jersey; Chrissy Houlahan, Pennsylvania; Veronica Escobar, Texas, Vice Chair; Sara Jacobs, California; Marilyn Strickland, Washington; Marc Veasey, Texas	Jim Banks, Indiana, Ranking Member; Stephanie Bice, Oklahoma; Lisa McClain, Michigan; Ronny Jackson, Texas; Jerry Carl, Alabama; Pat Fallon, Texas
Ex officio
Adam Smith, Washington	Mike Rogers, Alabama

== See also ==
- U.S. Senate Armed Services Subcommittee on Personnel
