= United States House Armed Services Subcommittee on Tactical Air and Land Forces =

Committee of the House of Representatives

Subcommittee of Committee on Armed Services
- Active United States House of Representatives; 119th Congress

Leadership
- Chair: Rob Wittman (R)
- Ranking Member: Donald Norcross (D)

Structure
- Seats: 18 (18 currently filled) 10/10 8/8
- Political parties: Majority (10): Republican (10); Minority (8): Democratic (8)

Meeting place
- 2216, Rayburn House Office Building; Washington, D.C. 20515

Phone number
- (202)-225-4151

House Armed Services Subcommittee on Tactical Air and Land Forces is a subcommittee of the House Armed Services Committee in the United States House of Representatives.

The chair of the subcommittee is Republican Rob Wittman of Virginia and its Ranking Member is Democrat Donald Norcross of New Jersey.

== Jurisdiction ==
The Air and Land Forces Subcommittee exercises oversight and legislative jurisdiction over:

1. United States Army
2. United States Air Force
3. deep strike bombers
4. Army and Air National Guard
5. Army and Air Force Reserve
6. ammunition programs.

Does not include strategic missiles, special operations and information technology programs.

== Members, 119th Congress ==
Majority	Minority
Rob Wittman, Virginia, Chair; Mike Turner, Ohio; Sam Graves, Missouri; Carlos A. Giménez, Florida; Brad Finstad, Minnesota; Rich McCormick, Georgia; Lance Gooden, Texas; John McGuire, Virginia; Derek Schmidt, Kansas; Abraham Hamadeh, Arizona	Donald Norcross, New Jersey, Ranking Member; Joe Courtney, Connecticut; Salud Carbajal, California; Mikie Sherrill, New Jersey; Don Davis, North Carolina; Eric Sorensen, Illinois; Maggie Goodlander, New Hampshire; Wesley Bell, Missouri
Ex officio
Mike Rogers, Alabama	Adam Smith, Washington

== Historical membership rosters ==
=== 118th Congress ===
Majority	Minority
Rob Wittman, Virginia, Chair; Mike Turner, Ohio; Doug Lamborn, Colorado; Sam Graves, Missouri; Don Bacon, Nebraska; Lisa McClain, Michigan; Pat Fallon, Texas; Carlos Gimenez, Florida; Nick LaLota, New York; Rich McCormick, Georgia	Donald Norcross, New Jersey, Ranking Member; Joe Courtney, Connecticut; Ruben Gallego, Arizona; Salud Carbajal, California; Mikie Sherrill, New Jersey; Pat Ryan, New York; Jeff Jackson, North Carolina; Steven Horsford, Nevada
Ex officio
Mike Rogers, Alabama	Adam Smith, Washington

=== 115th Congress ===
Majority	Minority
Mike Turner, Ohio, Chairman; Frank LoBiondo, New Jersey; Paul Cook, California; Sam Graves, Missouri; Martha McSally, Arizona; Steve Knight, California; Trent Kelly, Mississippi; Matt Gaetz, Florida; Don Bacon, Nebraska; Jim Banks, Indiana; Walter B. Jones, North Carolina; Rob Bishop, Utah; Rob Wittman, Virginia; Mo Brooks, Alabama	Niki Tsongas, Massachusetts, Ranking Member; James Langevin, Rhode Island; Marc Veasey, Texas; Ruben Gallego, Arizona; Salud Carbajal, California; Tom O'Halleran, Arizona
Ex officio
Mac Thornberry, Texas	Adam Smith, Washington

=== 116th Congress ===
Majority	Minority
Donald Norcross, New Jersey, Chair; James Langevin, Rhode Island; Joe Courtney, Connecticut; Ruben Gallego, Arizona; Salud Carbajal, California; Anthony Brown, Maryland; Filemon Vela Jr., Texas; Xochitl Torres Small, New Mexico; Mikie Sherrill, New Jersey; Katie Hill, California; Jared Golden, Maine	Vicky Hartzler, Missouri, Ranking Member; Paul Cook, California; Matt Gaetz, Florida; Don Bacon, Nebraska; Jim Banks, Indiana; Paul Mitchell, Michigan; Mike Turner, Ohio; Doug Lamborn, Colorado; Rob Wittman, Virginia
Ex officio
Adam Smith, Washington	Mac Thornberry, Texas

=== 117th Congress ===
Majority	Minority
Donald Norcross, New Jersey, Chair; Ruben Gallego, Arizona; Salud Carbajal, California; Anthony Brown, Maryland; Mikie Sherrill, New Jersey, Vice Chair; Kai Kahele, Hawaii; Marc Veasey, Texas; Stephanie Murphy, Florida	Vicky Hartzler, Missouri, Ranking Member; Mike Turner, Ohio; Rob Wittman, Virginia; Scott DesJarlais, Tennessee; Matt Gaetz, Florida; Don Bacon, Nebraska; Mark E. Green, Tennessee; Ronny Jackson, Texas
Ex officio
Adam Smith, Washington	Mike Rogers, Alabama

== See also ==
- U.S. Senate Armed Services Subcommittee on Airland
