= Jeff Crank =

American politician (born 1967)

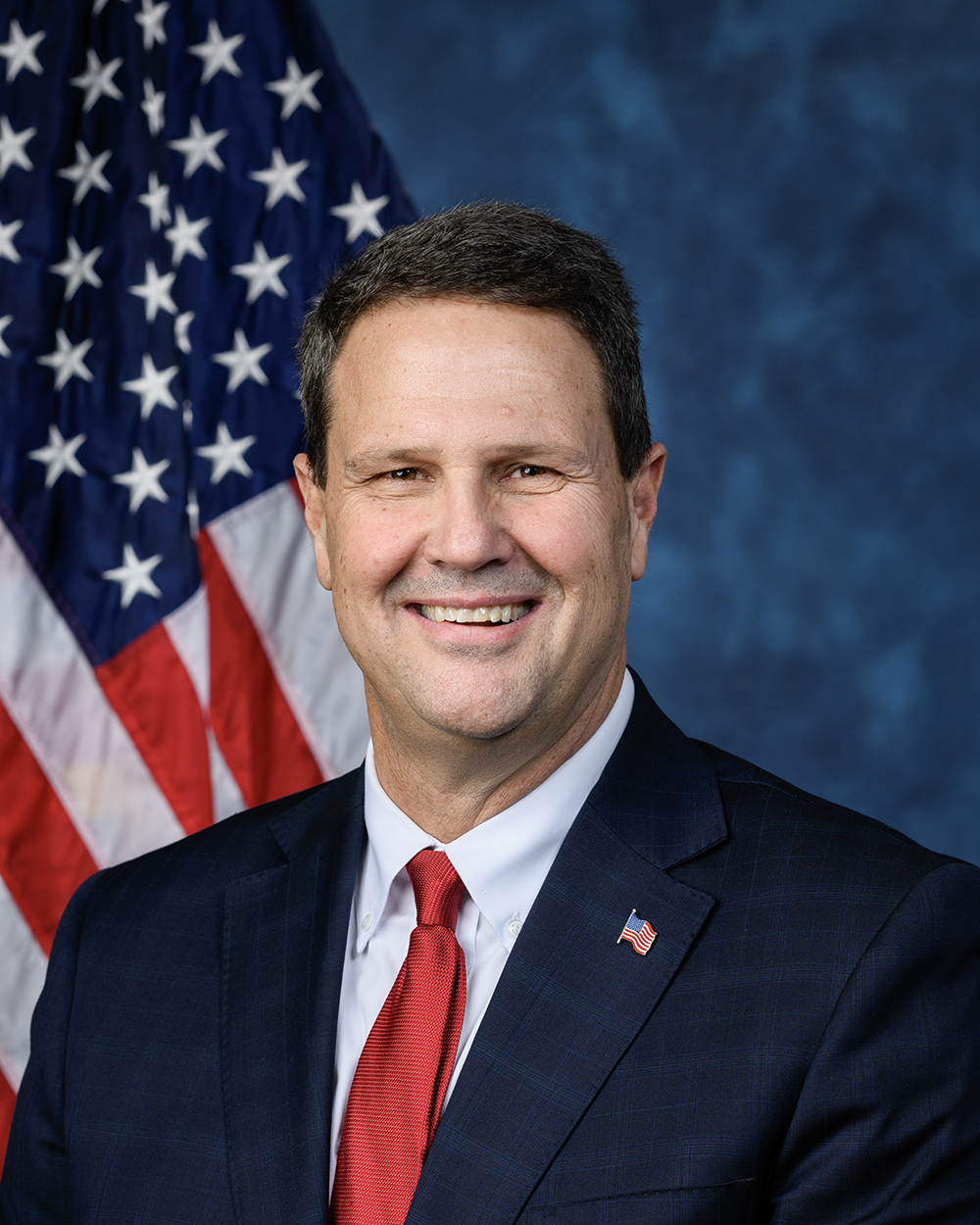
- Official portrait, 2024

Member of the U.S. House of Representatives from Colorado's 5th district
- Incumbent
- Assumed office January 3, 2025
- Preceded by: Doug Lamborn

Personal details
- Born: Jeffrey George Crank; January 28, 1967 (age 59) Pueblo, Colorado, U.S.
- Party: Republican
- Spouse: Lisa Brown
- Children: 2
- Education: Colorado State University (BA)
- Website: House website Campaign website

Jeffrey George Crank (born January 28, 1967) is an American politician and radio show host who has served as the U.S. representative for Colorado's 5th congressional district since 2025.

== Early life, education, and career ==
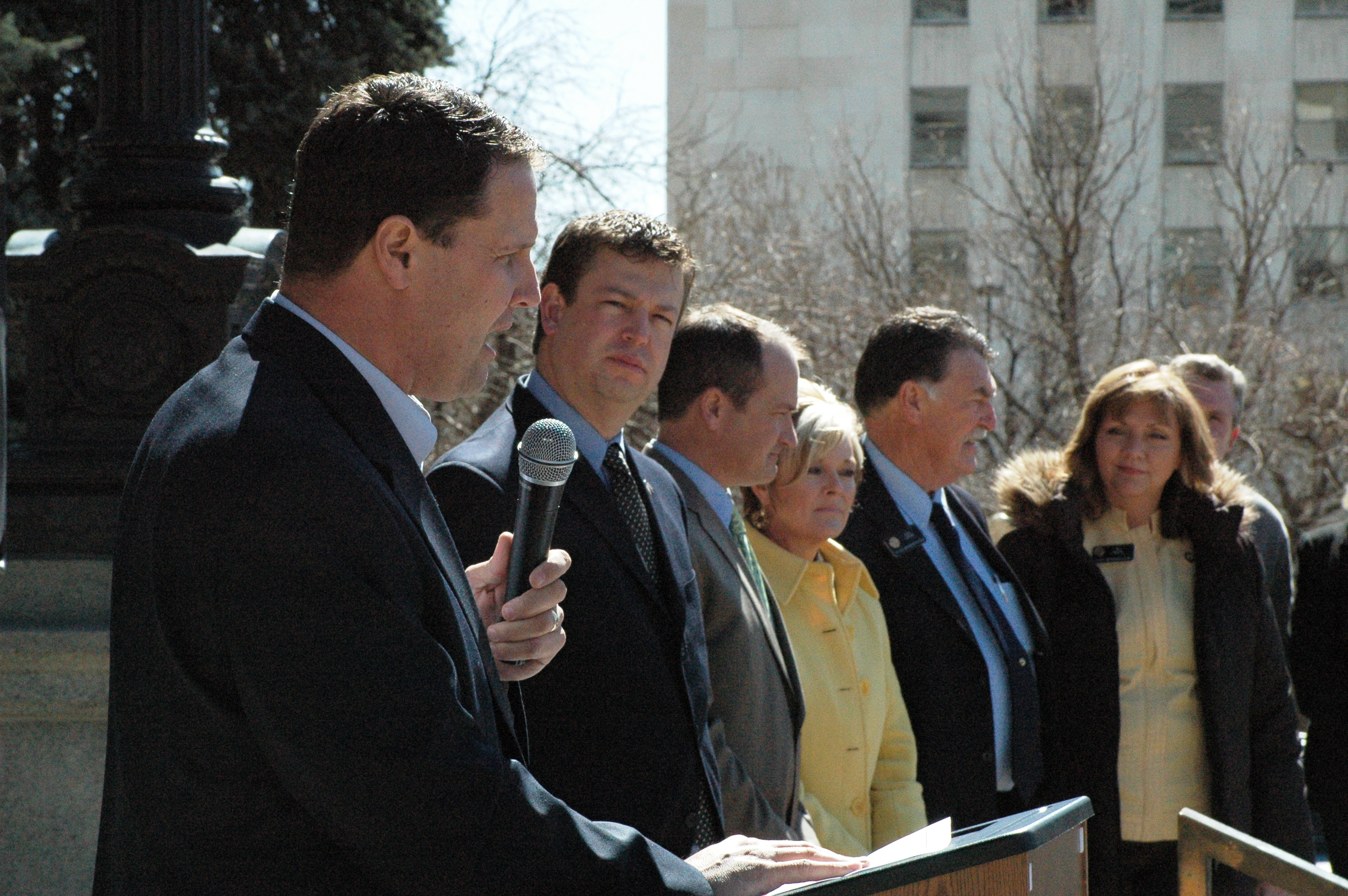
Crank speaks at an anti-tax rally outside the Colorado Senate in 2011.

Crank was born in Pueblo, Colorado, in 1967 and earned a Bachelor of Arts in political science from Colorado State University. He hosted a talk radio show on KVOR-AM. From 1991 to 1998, he worked as a congressional staffer for Representative Joel Hefley, being a legislative assistant until being promoted as administrative director in April 1995. After working for Hefley, he became vice president of the Colorado Springs Chamber of Commerce in May 1998 and was later promoted to senior vice president in October 2001. He left the Greater Colorado Springs Chamber of Commerce in February 2006.

Crank was elected as chairman of the 5th Congressional District Republican Central Committee in 2001 and 2003. In 2003, he was appointed to the Colorado Emergency Planning Commission by Governor of Colorado Bill Owens for a two-year term and also served on the El Paso County Citizens Corps Council in 2004. He was the El Paso county co-chair for President George W. Bush's re-election campaign in 2004. Crank was later elected in 2004 to serve on the Colorado State Republican Central Committee as a bonus member.

Crank served as the Colorado state director for Americans for Prosperity from May 2009 to August 2013. He resigned from the position to form a political consulting company, Aegis Strategic.

== U.S. House of Representatives ==
=== Elections ===
==== 2006 ====
Crank ran for US Representative in 2006 to replace retiring incumbent Representative Joel Hefley. He narrowly lost the Republican primary to state Senator Doug Lamborn.

==== 2008 ====
Crank again ran for the U.S. House in 2008, however he was defeated in the primary by the incumbent Doug Lamborn.

==== 2024 ====
On January 9, 2024, Crank announced that he was again running for United States House of Representatives Colorado 5th Congressional District in the 2024 elections, replacing retiring U.S. Representative Doug Lamborn. He won that election in November, becoming the member-elect.

==== 2026 ====
Jessica Killin defeated Crank in the November 2026 general election.

=== Tenure ===
In January 2026, Crank voted against extending the Affordable Care Act enhanced tax credits.

=== Committee assignments ===
- Committee on Armed Services
  - Subcommittee on Cyber, Information Technologies, and Innovation
  - Subcommittee on Military Personnel
  - Subcommittee on Strategic Forces
- Committee on Natural Resources
  - Subcommittee on Energy and Mineral Resources
  - Subcommittee on Water, Wildlife and Fisheries

=== Caucus membership ===
- Congressional Western Caucus

== Personal life ==
Crank lives in Colorado Springs, Colorado, with his wife Lisa and their two children.

== Elections ==
2006 Republican Primary Congressional Election
Party	Candidate	Votes	%
Republican	Doug Lamborn	15,126	26.97
Republican	Jeff Crank	14,234	25.38
Republican	Bentley Rayburn	9,735	17.36
Republican	Lionel Rivera	7,213	12.86
Republican	John Wesley Anderson	6,474	11.54
Republican	Duncan Bremer	3,310	5.90

2008 Republican Primary Congressional Election
Party	Candidate	Votes	%
Republican	Doug Lamborn	24,995	44%
Republican	Jeff Crank	16,794	30%
Republican	Bentley Rayburn	14,986	26%

2024 Republican Primary Congressional Election
Party	Candidate	Votes	%
Republican	Jeff Crank	56,585	65%
Republican	Dave Williams	30,257	35%

2024 General Congressional Election
Party	Candidate	Votes	%
Republican	Jeff Crank	134,970	54.8%
Democratic	River Gassen	102,937	41.8%
Libertarian	Michael Vance	3,253	1.3%
Independent Politician	Joseph O. Gaye	2,175	0.9%
American Constitution	Christopher Mitchell	2,132	0.9%
Forward	Christopher Sweat	846	0.3%
Independent Politician	Marcus Murphy (Write-In)	0	0%

U.S. House of Representatives
Preceded by Doug Lamborn	Member of the U.S. House of Representatives from Colorado's 5th congressional district 2025–present	Incumbent
U.S. order of precedence (ceremonial)
Preceded by Herb Conaway	United States representatives by seniority 373rd	Succeeded by Maxine Dexter
