= United States House Armed Services Subcommittee on Cyber, Information Technologies, and Innovation =

Subcommittee of Committee on Armed Services
- Active United States House of Representatives; 119th Congress

Leadership
- Chair: Don Bacon (R)
- Ranking Member: Ro Khanna (D)

Structure
- Seats: 19 (19 currently filled) 10/10 9/9
- Political parties: Majority (10): Republican (10); Minority (9): Democratic (9)

Meeting place
- 2216, Rayburn House Office Building; Washington, D.C. 20515

Phone number
- (202)-225-4151

House Armed Services Subcommittee on Cyber, Innovative Technologies and Information Systems is a subcommittee of the House Armed Services Committee in the United States House of Representatives. It was created for the 117th United States Congress.

The Chair of the subcommittee is Republican Don Bacon of Nebraska, and the Ranking Member is Democrat Ro Khanna of California.

== Jurisdiction ==
According to the Subcommittee's website, it has jurisdiction over the following areas:

- Department of Defense policy related to the acquisition of:
  - computer software,
  - the electromagnetic spectrum, and
  - electromagnetic warfare;
- Department of Defense policy and programs and accounts related to:
  - artificial intelligence,
  - cyber security,
  - cyber operations,
  - cyber forces,
  - information technology, and
  - science and technology (including defense-wide programs and accounts related to research, development, testing, and evaluation, except for those defense-wide programs and accounts related to research, development, testing, and evaluation of missile defense systems).

== Members, 119th Congress ==
Majority	Minority
Don Bacon, Nebraska, Chair; Elise Stefanik, New York; Pat Fallon, Texas; Brad Finstad, Minnesota; Morgan Luttrell, Texas; Jen Kiggans, Virginia; Rich McCormick, Georgia; Lance Gooden, Texas; John McGuire, Virginia; Jeff Crank, Colorado	Ro Khanna, California, Ranking Member; Seth Moulton, Massachusetts; Bill Keating, Massachusetts; Chrissy Houlahan, Pennsylvania; Jason Crow, Colorado; Mikie Sherrill, New Jersey; Pat Ryan, New York; George Whitesides, California; Eugene Vindman, Virginia
Ex officio
Mike Rogers, Alabama	Adam Smith, Washington

== Historical membership rosters ==
=== 118th Congress ===
Majority	Minority
Don Bacon, Nebraska, Chair; Matt Gaetz, Florida; Lisa McClain, Michigan; Pat Fallon, Texas; Dale Strong, Alabama; Morgan Luttrell, Texas; Jen Kiggans, Virginia; Nick LaLota, New York; Rich McCormick, Georgia	Ro Khanna, California, Ranking Member; Seth Moulton, Massachusetts; Bill Keating, Massachusetts; Andy Kim, New Jersey; Elissa Slotkin, Michigan; Jared Golden, Maine; Pat Ryan, New York; Chris Deluzio, Pennsylvania
Ex officio
Mike Rogers, Alabama	Adam Smith, Washington
