= United States House Committee on Armed Services =

Standing committee of the U.S. House of Representatives

House Armed Services Committee
Standing committee
- Active United States House of Representatives; 119th Congress

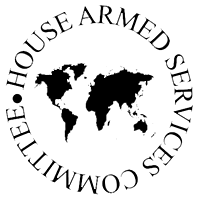
- Committee logo

History
- Formed: August 2, 1946
- Preceded: Committee on Military Affairs, Committee on Naval Affairs
- Formerly known as: Committee on National Security

Leadership
- Chair: Mike D. Rogers (R); Since January 3, 2023
- Ranking Member: Adam Smith (D); Since January 3, 2023

Structure
- Seats: 57 (57 currently filled) 30/30 27/27
- Political parties: Majority (30): Republican (30); Minority (27): Democratic (27)

Jurisdiction
- Policy areas: Defense policy, military operations
- Oversight authority: Department of Defense, Armed Forces, Department of Energy (partly)
- Senate counterpart: Senate Armed Services Committee

Subcommittees
- Military Personnel; Readiness; Tactical Air and Land Forces; Intelligence and Special Operations; Seapower and Projection Forces; Strategic Forces; Cyber, Information Technologies, and Innovation

Meeting place
- 2216, Rayburn House Office Building; Washington, D.C. 20515

Website
- armedservices.house.gov (Republican) democrats-armedservices.house.gov (Democratic)

Phone number
- (202)-225-4151

The United States House Committee on Armed Services, commonly known as the House Armed Services Committee or HASC, is a standing committee of the United States House of Representatives. It is responsible for funding and oversight of the Department of Defense (DoD) and the United States Armed Forces, as well as substantial portions of the Department of Energy. Its regular legislative product is the National Defense Authorization Act, which has been passed by Congress and signed into law each year since 1962.

== Jurisdiction ==
The Armed Services Committee has jurisdiction over defense policy generally, ongoing military operations, the organization and reform of the Department of Defense and Department of Energy, counter-drug programs, acquisition and industrial base policy, technology transfer and export controls, joint interoperability, the Cooperative Threat Reduction program, Department of Energy nonproliferation programs, and detainee affairs and policy.

== History ==
The Armed Services Committee was created by the Legislative Reorganization Act of 1946, which consolidated the functions of two predecessor committees: the Committee on Military Affairs and the Committee on Naval Affairs, which were established as standing committees in 1822. Another predecessor, the Committee on the Militia, was created in 1835 and existed until 1911 when it was abolished and its jurisdiction transferred to the Committee on Military Affairs. When Republicans took control of the House of Representatives in 1994, the committee was renamed the Committee on National Security. It was later renamed the Committee on Armed Services.

== Members, 119th Congress ==
Majority	Minority
Mike Rogers, Alabama, Chair; Joe Wilson, South Carolina; Mike Turner, Ohio; Rob Wittman, Virginia, Vice Chair; Austin Scott, Georgia; Sam Graves, Missouri; Elise Stefanik, New York; Scott DesJarlais, Tennessee; Trent Kelly, Mississippi; Don Bacon, Nebraska; Jack Bergman, Michigan; Lisa McClain, Michigan; Ronny Jackson, Texas; Pat Fallon, Texas; Carlos A. Giménez, Florida; Nancy Mace, South Carolina; Brad Finstad, Minnesota; Morgan Luttrell, Texas; Jen Kiggans, Virginia; James Moylan, Guam; Cory Mills, Florida; Rich McCormick, Georgia; Lance Gooden, Texas; Clay Higgins, Louisiana; Derrick Van Orden, Wisconsin; John McGuire, Virginia; Pat Harrigan, North Carolina; Mark Messmer, Indiana; Derek Schmidt, Kansas; Jeff Crank, Colorado; Abraham Hamadeh, Arizona	Adam Smith, Washington, Ranking Member; Joe Courtney, Connecticut; John Garamendi, California; Donald Norcross, New Jersey; Seth Moulton, Massachusetts; Salud Carbajal, California; Ro Khanna, California; Bill Keating, Massachusetts; Chrissy Houlahan, Pennsylvania; Jason Crow, Colorado; Mikie Sherrill, New Jersey (until November 20, 2025); Jared Golden, Maine; Sara Jacobs, California; Marilyn Strickland, Washington; Pat Ryan, New York; Gabe Vasquez, New Mexico; Chris Deluzio, Pennsylvania; Jill Tokuda, Hawaii; Don Davis, North Carolina, Vice Ranking Member; Gil Cisneros, California; Eric Sorensen, Illinois; Maggie Goodlander, New Hampshire; Sarah Elfreth, Maryland; George T. Whitesides, California; Derek Tran, California; Eugene Vindman, Virginia; Wesley Bell, Missouri; Herb Conaway, New Jersey (from November 18, 2025)

Resolutions electing members: H.Res. 13 (Chair), H.Res. 14 (Ranking Member), H.Res. 31 (R), H.Res. 40 (D), H.Res. 887 (Conaway)

== Subcommittees ==
Subcommittee	Chair	Ranking Member
Cyber, Information Technologies, and Innovation	Don Bacon (R-NE)	Ro Khanna (D-CA)
Intelligence and Special Operations	Ronny Jackson (R-TX)	Jason Crow (D-CO)
Military Personnel	Pat Fallon (R-TX)	Chrissy Houlahan (D-PA)
Readiness	Jack Bergman (R-MI)	John Garamendi (D-CA)
Seapower and Projection Forces	Trent Kelly (R-MS)	Joe Courtney (D-CT)
Strategic Forces	Scott DesJarlais (R-TN)	Seth Moulton (D-MA)
Tactical Air and Land Forces	Rob Wittman (R-VA)	Donald Norcross (D-NJ)

== Historical membership rosters ==
=== 114th Congress ===
Majority	Minority
Mac Thornberry, Texas, Chair; Walter B. Jones, North Carolina; Randy Forbes, Virginia; Jeff Miller, Florida; Joe Wilson, South Carolina; Frank LoBiondo, New Jersey; Rob Bishop, Utah; Mike Turner, Ohio; John Kline, Minnesota; Mike Rogers, Alabama; Trent Franks, Arizona; Bill Shuster, Pennsylvania; Mike Conaway, Texas; Doug Lamborn, Colorado; Rob Wittman, Virginia; Duncan D. Hunter, California; John Fleming, Louisiana; Mike Coffman, Colorado; Chris Gibson, New York; Vicky Hartzler, Missouri; Joe Heck, Nevada; Austin Scott, Georgia; Steven Palazzo, Mississippi; Mo Brooks, Alabama; Rich Nugent, Florida; Paul Cook, California; Jim Bridenstine, Oklahoma; Brad Wenstrup, Ohio; Jackie Walorski, Indiana; Bradley Byrne, Alabama; Sam Graves, Missouri; Ryan Zinke, Montana; Elise Stefanik, New York; Martha McSally, Arizona; Steve Knight, California; Tom MacArthur, New Jersey	Adam Smith, Washington, Ranking Member; Loretta Sanchez, California; Bob Brady, Pennsylvania; Susan Davis, California; James Langevin, Rhode Island; Rick Larsen, Washington; Jim Cooper, Tennessee; Madeleine Bordallo, Guam; Joe Courtney, Connecticut; Niki Tsongas, Massachusetts; John Garamendi, California; Hank Johnson, Georgia; Jackie Speier, California; Joaquin Castro, Texas; Tammy Duckworth, Illinois; Scott Peters, California; Marc Veasey, Texas; Tulsi Gabbard, Hawaii; Tim Walz, Minnesota; Beto O'Rourke, Texas; Donald Norcross, New Jersey; Mark Takai, Hawaii; Gwen Graham, Florida; Ruben Gallego, Arizona; Brad Ashford, Nebraska; Seth Moulton, Massachusetts; Pete Aguilar, California

=== 115th Congress ===
Majority	Minority
Mac Thornberry, Texas, Chair; Walter B. Jones Jr., North Carolina; Joe Wilson, South Carolina; Frank LoBiondo, New Jersey; Rob Bishop, Utah; Mike Turner, Ohio; Mike Rogers, Alabama; Bill Shuster, Pennsylvania; Mike Conaway, Texas; Doug Lamborn, Colorado; Rob Wittman, Virginia; Duncan D. Hunter, California; Mike Coffman, Colorado; Vicky Hartzler, Missouri; Austin Scott, Georgia; Mo Brooks, Alabama; Paul Cook, California; Bradley Byrne, Alabama; Sam Graves, Missouri; Elise Stefanik, New York; Martha McSally, Arizona; Steve Knight, California; Steve Russell, Oklahoma; Scott DesJarlais, Tennessee; Ralph Abraham, Louisiana; Trent Kelly, Mississippi; Mike Gallagher, Wisconsin; Matt Gaetz, Florida; Don Bacon, Nebraska; Jim Banks, Indiana; Liz Cheney, Wyoming; Jody Hice, Georgia; Paul Mitchell, Michigan; Vacancy	Adam Smith, Washington, Ranking Member; Bob Brady, Pennsylvania; Susan A. Davis, California; James R. Langevin, Rhode Island; Rick Larsen, Washington; Jim Cooper, Tennessee; Madeleine Bordallo, Guam; Joe Courtney, Connecticut; Niki Tsongas, Massachusetts; John Garamendi, California; Jackie Speier, California; Marc Veasey, Texas; Tulsi Gabbard, Hawaii; Beto O'Rourke, Texas, Vice Ranking Member; Donald Norcross, New Jersey; Ruben Gallego, Arizona; Seth Moulton, Massachusetts; Colleen Hanabusa, Hawaii; Carol Shea-Porter, New Hampshire; Jacky Rosen, Nevada; Donald McEachin, Virginia; Salud Carbajal, California; Anthony Brown, Maryland; Stephanie Murphy, Florida; Ro Khanna, California; Tom O'Halleran, Arizona; Tom Suozzi, New York; Jimmy Panetta, California

=== 116th Congress ===
Majority	Minority
Adam Smith, Washington, Chair; Susan Davis, California; Jim Langevin, Rhode Island; Rick Larsen, Washington; Jim Cooper, Tennessee; Joe Courtney, Connecticut; John Garamendi, California; Jackie Speier, California; Tulsi Gabbard, Hawaii; Donald Norcross, New Jersey; Ruben Gallego, Arizona; Seth Moulton, Massachusetts; Salud Carbajal, California; Anthony Brown, Maryland, Vice Chair; Ro Khanna, California; Bill Keating, Massachusetts; Filemon Vela Jr., Texas; Andy Kim, New Jersey; Kendra Horn, Oklahoma; Gil Cisneros, California; Chrissy Houlahan, Pennsylvania; Jason Crow, Colorado; Xochitl Torres Small, New Mexico; Elissa Slotkin, Michigan; Mikie Sherrill, New Jersey; Veronica Escobar, Texas; Deb Haaland, New Mexico; Jared Golden, Maine; Lori Trahan, Massachusetts; Elaine Luria, Virginia; Anthony Brindisi, New York (since November 19, 2019)	Mac Thornberry, Texas, Ranking Member; Joe Wilson, South Carolina; Rob Bishop, Utah; Mike Turner, Ohio; Mike Rogers, Alabama; Michael Conaway, Texas; Doug Lamborn, Colorado; Rob Wittman, Virginia; Vicky Hartzler, Missouri; Austin Scott, Georgia; Mo Brooks, Alabama; Paul Cook, California; Bradley Byrne, Alabama; Sam Graves, Missouri; Elise Stefanik, New York; Scott DesJarlais, Tennessee; Ralph Abraham, Louisiana; Trent Kelly, Mississippi; Mike Gallagher, Wisconsin; Matt Gaetz, Florida; Don Bacon, Nebraska; Jim Banks, Indiana; Liz Cheney, Wyoming; Paul Mitchell, Michigan; Jack Bergman, Michigan; Mike Waltz, Florida

Resolutions electing members: H.Res. 24 (Chair), H.Res. 25 (Ranking Member), H.Res. 42 (D), H.Res. 68 (R), H.Res. 712 (D)

=== 117th Congress ===
Majority	Minority
Adam Smith, Washington, Chair; James Langevin, Rhode Island; Rick Larsen, Washington; Jim Cooper, Tennessee; Joe Courtney, Connecticut; John Garamendi, California; Jackie Speier, California; Donald Norcross, New Jersey; Ruben Gallego, Arizona; Seth Moulton, Massachusetts; Salud Carbajal, California; Anthony Brown, Maryland; Ro Khanna, California; Bill Keating, Massachusetts; Filemon Vela Jr., Texas (retired from Congress April 1, 2022); Andy Kim, New Jersey; Chrissy Houlahan, Pennsylvania; Jason Crow, Colorado; Elissa Slotkin, Michigan; Mikie Sherrill, New Jersey; Veronica Escobar, Texas; Jared Golden, Maine; Elaine Luria, Virginia, Vice Chair; Joseph Morelle, New York; Sara Jacobs, California; Kai Kahele, Hawaii; Marilyn Strickland, Washington; Pat Ryan, New York (since September 14, 2022); Marc Veasey, Texas; Jimmy Panetta, California; Stephanie Murphy, Florida; Steven Horsford, Nevada (since May 12, 2021); Sylvia Garcia, Texas (since May 11, 2022)	Mike Rogers, Alabama, Ranking Member; Joe Wilson, South Carolina; Mike Turner, Ohio; Doug Lamborn, Colorado; Rob Wittman, Virginia, Vice Ranking Member; Vicky Hartzler, Missouri; Austin Scott, Georgia; Mo Brooks, Alabama; Sam Graves, Missouri; Elise Stefanik, New York; Scott DesJarlais, Tennessee; Trent Kelly, Mississippi; Mike Gallagher, Wisconsin; Matt Gaetz, Florida; Don Bacon, Nebraska; Jim Banks, Indiana; Liz Cheney, Wyoming; Jack Bergman, Michigan; Mike Waltz, Florida; Mike Johnson, Louisiana; Mark Green, Tennessee; Stephanie Bice, Oklahoma; Scott Franklin, Florida; Lisa McClain, Michigan; Ronny Jackson, Texas; Jerry Carl, Alabama; Blake Moore, Utah; Pat Fallon, Texas

Resolutions electing members: H.Res. 9 (Chair), H.Res. 10 (Ranking Member), H.Res. 62 (D), H.Res. 63 (R), H.Res. 384 (D), H.Res. 1347 (D)

Subcommittees

Subcommittee	Chair	Ranking Member
Cyber, Innovative Technologies and Information Systems	James Langevin (D-RI)	Elise Stefanik (R-NY)
Intelligence and Special Operations	Ruben Gallego (D-AZ)	Trent Kelly (R-MS)
Military Personnel	Jackie Speier (D-CA)	Jim Banks (R-IN)
Readiness	John Garamendi (D-CA)	Mike Waltz (R-FL)
Seapower and Projection Forces	Joe Courtney (D-CT)	Rob Wittman (R-VA)
Strategic Forces	Jim Cooper (D-TN)	Doug Lamborn (R-CO)
Tactical Air and Land Forces	Donald Norcross (D-NJ)	Vicky Hartzler (R-MO)

=== 118th Congress ===
Majority	Minority
Mike Rogers, Alabama, Chair; Joe Wilson, South Carolina; Mike Turner, Ohio; Doug Lamborn, Colorado; Rob Wittman, Virginia, Vice Chair; Austin Scott, Georgia; Sam Graves, Missouri; Elise Stefanik, New York; Scott DesJarlais, Tennessee; Trent Kelly, Mississippi; Matt Gaetz, Florida; Don Bacon, Nebraska; Jim Banks, Indiana; Jack Bergman, Michigan; Mike Waltz, Florida; Mike Johnson, Louisiana (until October 25, 2023); Lisa McClain, Michigan; Ronny Jackson, Texas; Pat Fallon, Texas; Carlos A. Giménez, Florida; Nancy Mace, South Carolina; Brad Finstad, Minnesota; Dale Strong, Alabama; Morgan Luttrell, Texas; Jen Kiggans, Virginia; Nick LaLota, New York; James Moylan, Guam; Mark Alford, Missouri; Cory Mills, Florida; Rich McCormick, Georgia; Lance Gooden, Texas (from December 6, 2023)	Adam Smith, Washington, Ranking Member; Joe Courtney, Connecticut; John Garamendi, California; Donald Norcross, New Jersey; Ruben Gallego, Arizona; Seth Moulton, Massachusetts; Salud Carbajal, California; Ro Khanna, California; Bill Keating, Massachusetts; Andy Kim, New Jersey; Chrissy Houlahan, Pennsylvania; Jason Crow, Colorado (until February 27, 2023); Elissa Slotkin, Michigan; Mikie Sherrill, New Jersey; Veronica Escobar, Texas; Jared Golden, Maine; Sara Jacobs, California; Marilyn Strickland, Washington; Pat Ryan, New York; Jeff Jackson, North Carolina; Gabe Vasquez, New Mexico; Chris Deluzio, Pennsylvania; Jill Tokuda, Hawaii; Don Davis, North Carolina; Jennifer McClellan, Virginia (from March 8, 2023); Terri Sewell, Alabama; Steven Horsford, Nevada; Jimmy Panetta, California; Marc Veasey, Texas

Resolutions electing members: H.Res. 14 (Chair), H.Res. 15 (Ranking Member), H.Res. 79 (D), H.Res. 80 (R), H.Res. 164 (D), H.Res. 205 (D), H.Res. 913 (R)

Subcommittees

Subcommittee	Chair	Ranking Member
Cyber, Innovative Technologies and Information Systems	Don Bacon (R-NE)	Ro Khanna (D-CA)
Intelligence and Special Operations	Jack Bergman (R-MI)	Ruben Gallego (D-AZ)
Military Personnel	Jim Banks (R-IN)	Andy Kim (D-NJ)
Readiness	Mike Waltz (R-FL)	John Garamendi (D-CA)
Seapower and Projection Forces	Trent Kelly (R-MS)	Joe Courtney (D-CT)
Strategic Forces	Doug Lamborn (R-CO)	Seth Moulton (D-MA)
Tactical Air and Land Forces	Rob Wittman (R-VA)	Donald Norcross (D-NJ)

== Leadership since 1947 ==
Chairs
Name	Party	State	Start	End
Walter Andrews	Republican	New York	1947	1949
Carl Vinson	Democratic	Georgia	1949	1953
Dewey Short	Republican	Missouri	1953	1955
Carl Vinson	Democratic	Georgia	1955	1965
Mendel Rivers	Democratic	South Carolina	1965	1970
Philip Philbin	Democratic	Massachusetts	1970	1971
Edward Hébert	Democratic	Louisiana	1971	1975
Melvin Price	Democratic	Illinois	1975	1985
Les Aspin	Democratic	Wisconsin	1985	1993
Ron Dellums	Democratic	California	1993	1995
Floyd Spence	Republican	South Carolina	1995	2001
Bob Stump	Republican	Arizona	2001	2003
Duncan Hunter	Republican	California	2003	2007
Ike Skelton	Democratic	Missouri	2007	2011
Buck McKeon	Republican	California	2011	2015
Mac Thornberry	Republican	Texas	2015	2019
Adam Smith	Democratic	Washington	2019	2023
Mike Rogers	Republican	Alabama	2023	present

Ranking members
Name	Party	State	Start	End
Carl Vinson	Democratic	Georgia	1947	1949
Dewey Short	Republican	Missouri	1949	1953
Carl Vinson	Democratic	Georgia	1953	1955
Dewey Short	Republican	Missouri	1955	1957
Leslie Arends	Republican	Illinois	1957	1965
William Bates	Republican	Massachusetts	1965	1969
Leslie Arends	Republican	Illinois	1969	1973
William Bray	Republican	Indiana	1973	1975
Bob Wilson	Republican	California	1975	1981
William Dickinson	Republican	Alabama	1981	1993
Floyd Spence	Republican	South Carolina	1993	1995
Ron Dellums	Democratic	California	1995	1998
Ike Skelton	Democratic	Missouri	1998	2007
Duncan Hunter	Republican	California	2007	2009
John McHugh	Republican	New York	2009	
Buck McKeon	Republican	California	2009	2011
Adam Smith	Democratic	Washington	2011	2019
Mac Thornberry	Republican	Texas	2019	2021
Mike Rogers	Republican	Alabama	2021	2023
Adam Smith	Democratic	Washington	2023	present
