= Doug Lamborn =

American politician (born 1954)

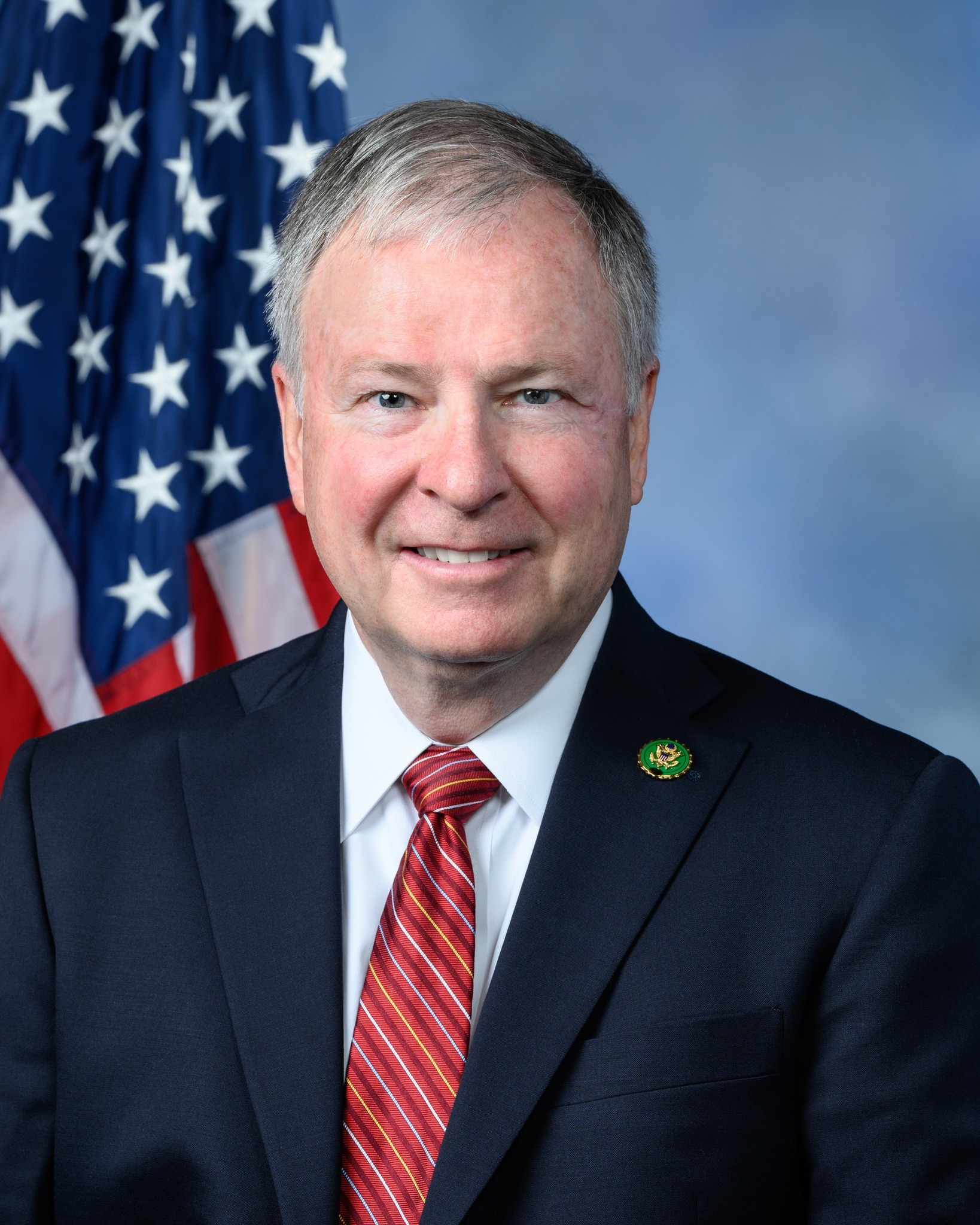
- Official portrait, 2023

Member of the U.S. House of Representatives from Colorado's 5th district
- In office January 3, 2007 – January 3, 2025
- Preceded by: Joel Hefley
- Succeeded by: Jeff Crank

Member of the Colorado Senate from the 9th district
- In office January 6, 1999 – January 3, 2007
- Preceded by: Charles Duke
- Succeeded by: David Schultheis

Member of the Colorado House of Representatives from the 20th district
- In office January 9, 1995 – January 6, 1999
- Preceded by: Charles Duke
- Succeeded by: Lynn Hefley

Personal details
- Born: Douglas Lawrence Lamborn; May 24, 1954 (age 72) Leavenworth, Kansas, U.S.
- Party: Republican
- Spouse: Jeanie Lamborn (m. 1977)
- Children: 5
- Education: University of Kansas (BS, JD)
- Website: House website
- Lamborn's voice Lamborn opens a hearing on the FY2024 nuclear forces budget request Recorded March 28, 2023

Douglas Lawrence Lamborn (born May 24, 1954) is an American attorney and politician who served as the U.S. representative for Colorado's 5th congressional district from 2007 to 2025. He is a member of the Republican Party. His district was based in Colorado Springs.

On January 5, 2024, Lamborn announced he would not seek reelection in 2024.

== Early life and career ==
Born in Leavenworth, Kansas, Lamborn attended Lansing High School, in Lansing, Kansas. After graduation, he earned a Bachelor of Science in journalism from the University of Kansas in 1978 and a Juris Doctor from the University of Kansas School of Law in 1985. He moved to Colorado Springs and became a private attorney focusing on business and real estate law.

== Colorado Legislature ==
=== Elections ===
In 1994, Lamborn was elected to the Colorado House of Representatives. In 1998, he was elected to the Colorado State Senate.

He was elected Republican House Whip in 1997. He was elected Senate President Pro-tem in 1999. Lamborn served in the Colorado Senate until winning a seat in the United States Congress.

=== Tenure ===
While in the State Senate, Lamborn sponsored the largest tax cut in Colorado history, and was named the highest-ranking tax cutter in the Senate five times by a conservative activist group called the Colorado Union of Taxpayers.

=== Committee assignments ===
Lamborn was the ranking Republican on the Colorado State Military and Veterans Affairs, and Appropriations committees.

== U.S. House of Representatives ==
=== Elections ===
==== 2006 ====
On February 16, 2006, Joel Hefley announced he would retire after 10 terms in Congress.

In the Republican primary to succeed him, Hefley backed his longtime aide, former Administrative Director Jeff Crank. In the August 8 election, Lamborn narrowly defeated Crank and four other candidates to win the nomination in a contentious race. He ran on conservative positions: opposing gun control, abortion except when the mother's life is threatened, federal funding of embryonic stem cell research, denying public benefits to illegal immigrants, and new eminent domain rulings.

Lamborn defeated Lieutenant Colonel Jay Fawcett, the Democratic nominee, on November 7.

==== 2008 ====
Jeff Crank and Major General Bentley Rayburn both challenged Lamborn in the 2008 Republican primary. Both had lost to Lamborn in the 2006 primary. Lamborn won the primary election on August 12 with 45% of the 56,171 votes cast to Crank's 29% and Rayburn's 26%.

Lamborn defeated Democratic nominee Lieutenant Colonel Hal Bidlack in the general election.

==== 2010 ====
Lamborn was challenged by Democratic nominee Lieutenant Colonel Kevin Bradley. He won reelection.

==== 2012 ====
Lamborn was challenged in the Republican primary by businessman Robert Blaha. Lamborn won 62–38 percent. He had the support of Phyllis Schlafly's Eagle Forum political action committee.

==== 2014 ====
Lamborn was challenged by Democratic nominee Major General Irv Halter. He won with 59.8% of the vote.

==== 2018 ====
In January 2018, Lamborn announced he would run for reelection in the 2018 elections. After a Colorado High Court ruling initially disqualified him from appearing on the June primary ballot due to questions of signatures and residency, he was reinstated on the ballot when a federal judge ruled in his favor, citing his First Amendment claim. He faced and defeated three challengers in the Republican primary. He won the general election.

==== 2020 ====
On January 9, Lamborn declared his candidacy for an eighth House term. He qualified for the primary ballot in March with over 2,000 valid signatures and won the June 30 primary unopposed. In the November general election, Lamborn defeated Democratic nominee Jillian Freeland.

=== Tenure ===
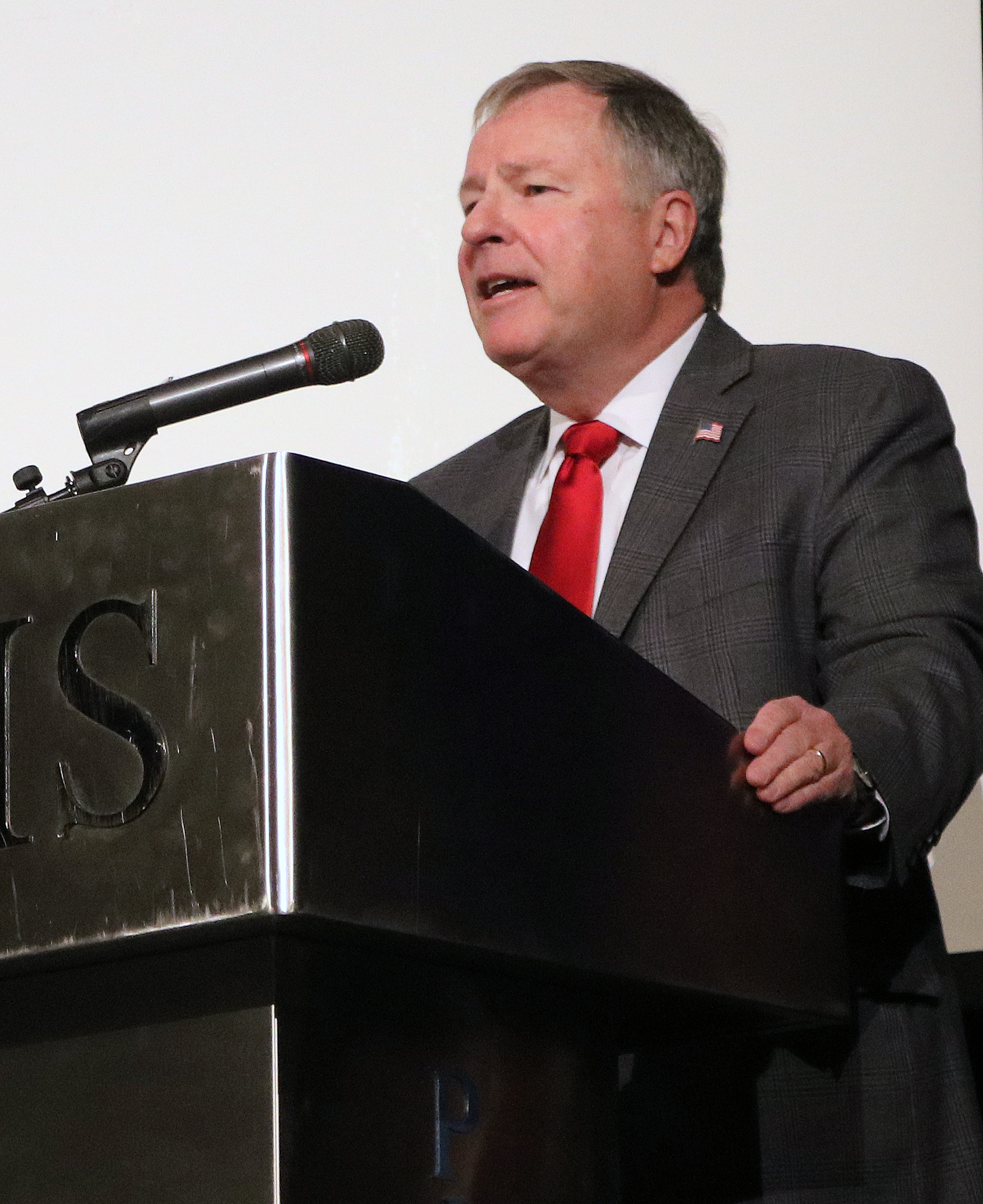
Lamborn in 2019

An office of the Immigration and Customs Enforcement agency was established in Colorado Springs in Lamborn's district in 2009 and increased immigration enforcement agents in the area from two to ten. "The immediate need is to address those that have committed a crime and make sure they're sent out of the country", Lamborn said. This would not place in jeopardy employers who hire illegal immigrants in the first place or who pay these workers without any withholding tax or below the minimum wage.

There has also been a Brigade Combat Team in his district since 2007. The Brigade Combat Team consisting of almost 5,000 soldiers, their families, support personnel as well as increased military construction.

Congressional Quarterly said that through the first August recess, Lamborn had voted by strict party lines the most of any House member and more than any other Republican.

He led an effort among conservative Republicans to force the Occupational Safety and Health Administration (OSHA) to discard proposed regulations that would have affected accessibility to small arms ammunition, which were opposed by Second Amendment groups.

In 2010, the National Journal named Lamborn the most conservative member of the House of Representatives.

Lamborn was one of the House Republicans leading the effort against public funding for the Corporation for Public Broadcasting and NPR (National Public Radio). "I have been seeking to push Big Bird out of the nest for over a year, based on the simple fact that we can no longer afford to spend taxpayer dollars on nonessential government programs. It's time for Big Bird to earn his wings and learn to fly on his own."

On August 24, 2007, Jonathan Bartha, who works for Focus on the Family (headquartered in Colorado Springs), and his wife Anna wrote a letter to the editor in a community newspaper expressing concerns about Lamborn's opposition to more restrictions on dogfighting. They were also concerned he had taken several campaign contributions from the gaming industry. A few days later, Lamborn allegedly left two voicemails threatening "consequences" if they didn't renounce their "blatantly false" letter. He also said that he would be "forced to take other steps" if the matter wasn't resolved "on a Scriptural level." The Barthas were shocked by the messages, and Anna Bartha called Lamborn's behavior "not anything we would ever anticipate an elected official would pursue."

As a freshman representative, Lamborn introduced legislation directing the Secretary of Veterans Affairs to establish a national cemetery for veterans in the Pikes Peak region of Colorado. On September 20, 2017, the Veterans Administration awarded a $31.8 million contract to G&C Fab-Con, LLC, to begin construction on the Pikes Peak National Cemetery in Colorado Springs.

Lamborn is a signer of Americans for Tax Reform's Taxpayer Protection Pledge.

In 2008 Lamborn signed a pledge sponsored by Americans for Prosperity promising to vote against any global warming legislation that would raise taxes.

Lamborn voted in favor of the Tax Cuts and Jobs Act of 2017. He said the bill would benefit craft beer breweries, many of which are in Colorado. Lamborn claimed the bill simplified the tax code such that people would be filing taxes by "sending a postcard". The tax filing process remained the same.

On July 29, 2011, Lamborn appeared on a Denver radio program to discuss the debt crisis and the failure of Democrats and Republicans to reach a compromise on the problem. He said, "Now, I don't even want to have to be associated with President Obama. It's like touching a tar baby and you get it, you're stuck, and you're a part of the problem now and you can't get away." The term tar baby is sometimes considered a racial slur used for African Americans. Former Colorado House Speaker Terrance Carroll, an African-American, replied, "Looking beyond the fact that Congressman Lamborn's entire comment is nonsensical, his use of the term 'tar baby' is unfortunate because [of] the historical connotation of that term when used in conjunction with African Americans."

On August 1, 2011, Lamborn apologized for his use of the slur. "When I said 'tar baby', I was talking economic quagmire that our country is finding ourselves in because of poor economic policy from the White House. I could have used a better term."

On January 23, 2012, Lamborn announced he would not attend Obama's State of the Union address. According to his spokeswoman Catherine Mortenson, "Congressman Lamborn is doing this to send a clear message that he does not support the policies of Barack Obama, that they have hurt our country", and believed Obama was "in full campaign mode and will use the address as an opportunity to bash his political opponents."

On April 11, 2013, Lamborn read out in an open session broadcast on C-SPAN an unclassified section from a classified report on North Korean nuclear capabilities. The chairman of the Joint Chiefs refused to confirm the classified report. The Pentagon later confirmed that the Defense Intelligence Agency had marked that sentence as unclassified mistakenly.

Lamborn is one of the 80 members of the House who signed a letter to the Speaker urging the threat of a government shutdown to defund Obamacare. This group was named the "Suicide Caucus". He voted against the measure that finally ended the shutdown on October 16, 2013.

On September 13, 2014, during a question and answer session, Lamborn made controversial remarks about Obama's foreign policy. He said, "A lot of us are talking to the generals behind the scenes, saying, 'Hey, if you disagree with the policy that the White House has given you, let's have a resignation. You know, let's have a public resignation, and state your protest, and go out in a blaze of glory!'"

Lamborn supported President Donald Trump's 2017 executive order to impose a temporary ban on entry to the U.S. to citizens of seven Muslim-majority countries. He said, "By taking steps to temporarily stop refugee admittance from nations that are hotbeds of terrorist activity, the President is taking prudent action to ensure that his national security and law enforcement teams have the strategies and systems in place that they will need to protect and defend America."

Lamborn was among GOP members of the House who did not support Speaker Paul Ryan's March 2017 effort to repeal and replace the Affordable Care Act. Seeking a more thorough repeal of the healthcare law, Lamborn said, "Right now Obamacare stays in place. That's bad for the American people and it doesn't leave Republicans an immediate opportunity to carry out their pledge to repeal and replace Obamacare. We need to regroup and very soon find a way to do that." Town hall meetings in April 2017 underscored the tension of Lamborn's relationship with the initial policies of the Trump Administration and voters in Lamborn's district.

Lamborn was one of only two members of the Colorado delegation to vote to reject Pennsylvania's Electoral College votes in the 2020 presidential election, even after the violent takeover of Congress by Trump supporters. On January 6, 2021, he voted against certifying the 2021 United States Electoral College vote count, citing unproven voter fraud claims.

In December 2022, Business Insider reported that Lamborn had violated the Stop Trading on Congressional Knowledge (STOCK) Act of 2012, a federal transparency and conflict-of-interest law, by failing to properly disclose trades of stock in NetApp by him and his wife worth between $68,000 and $120,000.

=== Legislation ===
Lamborn supported Senate bill 2195, which would allow the President of the United States to deny visas to any ambassador to the United Nations who has been found to have been engaged in espionage or terrorist activity against the United States or its allies and may pose a threat to U.S. national security interests.

The bill was written in response to Iran's choice of Hamid Aboutalebi as its ambassador. Aboutalebi was controversial due to his involvement in the Iran hostage crisis, in which of a number of American diplomats from the U.S. embassy in Tehran were held captive in 1979. Lamborn called Iran's selection of Aboutalebi "unconscionable and unacceptable". He argued that this legislation was needed to give the president the "authority he needs to deny this individual a visa."

=== Committee assignments ===
For the 118th Congress:

- Committee on Armed Services
  - Subcommittee on Strategic Forces (Chair)
  - Subcommittee on Tactical Air and Land Forces
- Committee on Natural Resources
  - Subcommittee on Energy and Mineral Resources
  - Subcommittee on Federal Lands

=== Caucus memberships ===
- Missile Defense Caucus (co-chair)
- Directed Energy Caucus (co-chair)
- Israel Allies Caucus (co-chair)
- Congressional Constitution Caucus
- House Sovereignty Caucus (co-founder)
- United States Congressional International Conservation Caucus
- Republican Israel Caucus (co-chair)
- Tea Party Caucus
- Congressional Small Brewers Caucus
- United Kingdom Caucus
- Congressional Cement Caucus
- House Baltic Caucus
- Congressional Ukraine Caucus
- Congressional Western Caucus
- U.S.-Japan Caucus
- Friends of Wales Caucus
- Republican Study Committee
- Congressional Taiwan Caucus

== Political positions ==
=== Economy ===
Lamborn does not support increasing minimum wage and believes that at least 500,000 Americans will lose their jobs as a result of wage increases. He supports social security reform.

=== Education ===
Lamborn does not support Common Core State Standards. He has described Common Core as "deeply flawed" and claimed that it "lowers educational standards," and removes parental influence over children's educations.

=== Texas v. Pennsylvania ===
In December 2020, Lamborn was one of 126 Republican members of the House of Representatives to sign an amicus brief in support of Texas v. Pennsylvania, a lawsuit filed at the United States Supreme Court contesting the results of the 2020 presidential election, in which Joe Biden defeated incumbent Donald Trump. The Supreme Court declined to hear the case on the basis that Texas lacked standing under Article III of the Constitution to challenge the results of an election held by another state.

=== Environment ===
Lamborn believes federal fees that impact the energy industry regarding climate change should not exist.

=== Gun policy ===
Lamborn does not support any new restrictions on gun sales.

=== Healthcare ===
Lamborn has called the Affordable Care Act (Obamacare) a "disaster." He supports the repeal, replacement and defunding of the program. He wants it to be replaced with unspecified "conservative, free-market solutions."

He supports the reform of Medicare and says that it is a "wasteful entitlement."

=== Social issues ===
Lamborn is anti-abortion, "does not support amnesty of any kind", and supports further efforts to secure the border. In 2015 in response to Christmas controversies, he introduced Resolution 564, receiving 35 cosponsors, to assert Christmas in public.

Lamborn opposes the legalization of marijuana.

Lamborn opposes same-sex marriage and condemned the Supreme Court decision Obergefell v. Hodges, which held that same-sex marriage bans violate the constitution.

== COVID-19 lawsuit ==
A former aide in May 2021 filed a federal lawsuit under the Congressional Accountability Act of 1995 accusing Lamborn of recklessly exposing staffers to the novel coronavirus and firing the aide when he raised objections. The lawsuit also alleges Lamborn allowed his son to live in the Capitol basement while he was relocating to Washington for work, and that Lamborn often called the pandemic a "hoax", lied to a Capitol physician, asked aides to run family errands, including loading furniture to be moved to their vacation home, and had aides help his son complete applications for federal jobs. The suit alleges that staffers were instructed not to tell anyone, including their families, roommates, and friends, that they had been in close contact with several office staffers who had tested positive for COVID-19 infection. Lamborn's office issued a statement denying the allegations.

== Electoral history ==
=== 2006 ===
==== Republican primary ====
Colorado's 5th congressional district Republican primary, 2006
Party	Candidate	Votes	%
Republican	Doug Lamborn	15,126	26.97
Republican	Jeff Crank	14,234	25.38
Republican	Bentley Rayburn	9,735	17.36
Republican	Lionel Rivera	7,213	12.86
Republican	John Wesley Anderson	6,474	11.54
Republican	Duncan Bremer	3,310	5.90

==== General ====
United States House of Representatives elections, 2006
Party	Candidate	Votes	%
Republican	Doug Lamborn	123,264	59.62
Democratic	Jay Fawcett	83,431	40.35
Republican	Richard D. Hand (write-in)	41	0.02
Democratic	Brian X. Scott (write-in)	12	0.01
Republican	Gregory S. Hollister (write-in)	8	0.00
Total votes		206,756	100
Republican hold			

=== 2008 ===
==== Republican primary ====
Colorado's 5th congressional district Republican primary, 2008
Party	Candidate	Votes	%
Republican	Doug Lamborn (incumbent)	24,995	44.02
Republican	Jeff Crank	16,794	29.58
Republican	Bentley Rayburn	14,986	26.40
Total votes		56,775	100

==== General ====
United States House of Representatives elections, 2008
Party	Candidate	Votes	%
Republican	Doug Lamborn (incumbent)	183,179	60.03
Democratic	Hal Bidlack	113,027	37.04
Constitution	Brian X. Scott	8,894	2.91
No party	Richard D. Hand (write-in)	45	0.03
Total votes		305,142	100
Republican hold			

=== 2010 ===
==== Republican primary ====
Colorado's 5th congressional district Republican primary, 2010
Party	Candidate	Votes	%
Republican	Doug Lamborn (incumbent)	60,906	100
Total votes		60,906	100

==== General ====
United States House of Representatives elections, 2010
Party	Candidate	Votes	%
Republican	Doug Lamborn (incumbent)	152,829	65.75
Democratic	Kevin Bradley	68,039	29.27
Constitution	Brian X. Scott	5,886	2.53
Libertarian	Jerrell Klaver	5,680	2.44
Total votes		232,434	100
Republican hold			

=== 2012 ===
==== Republican primary ====
Colorado's 5th congressional district Republican primary, 2012
Party	Candidate	Votes	%
Republican	Doug Lamborn (incumbent)	43,929	61.72
Republican	Robert Blaha	27,245	38.28
Total votes		71,174	100

==== General ====
United States House of Representatives elections, 2012
Party	Candidate	Votes	%
Republican	Doug Lamborn (incumbent)	199,639	64.98
Independent	Dave Anderson	53,318	17.35
Libertarian	Jim Pirtle	22,778	7.41
Green	Misha Luzov	18,284	5.95
Constitution	Kenneth R. Harvell	13,312	4.33
Republican	George Allen Cantrell (write-in)	6	0.00
Total votes		307,231	100
Republican hold			

=== 2014 ===
==== Republican primary ====
Colorado's 5th congressional district Republican primary, 2014
Party	Candidate	Votes	%
Republican	Doug Lamborn (incumbent)	38,741	52.56
Republican	Bentley Rayburn	34,967	47.44
Total votes		73,708	100

==== General ====
United States House of Representatives elections, 2014
Party	Candidate	Votes	%
Republican	Doug Lamborn (incumbent)	157,182	59.78
Democratic	Irv Halter	105,673	40.20
Total votes		262,855	100
Republican hold			

=== 2016 ===
==== Republican primary ====
Colorado's 5th congressional district Republican primary, 2016
Party	Candidate	Votes	%
Republican	Doug Lamborn (Incumbent)	51,018	68.03
Republican	Calandra Vargas	23,968	31.96
Total votes		74,986	100

==== General ====
United States House of Representatives elections, 2016
Party	Candidate	Votes	%
Republican	Doug Lamborn (Incumbent)	225,445	62.28
Democratic	Misty Plowright	111,676	30.85
Libertarian	Mike McRedmond	24,872	6.87
Total votes		361,993	100
Republican hold			

=== 2018 ===
==== Republican primary ====
Colorado's 5th congressional district Republican primary, 2018
Party	Candidate	Votes	%
Republican	Doug Lamborn (Incumbent)	54,974	52.15
Republican	Darryl Glenn	21,479	20.38
Republican	Owen Hill	19,141	18.16
Republican	Bill Rhea	6,167	5.85
Republican	Tyler Stevens	3,643	3.46
Total votes		105,404	100

==== General ====
United States House of Representatives elections, 2018
Party	Candidate	Votes	%
Republican	Doug Lamborn (Incumbent)	184,002	57.02
Democratic	Stephany Rose Spaulding	126,848	39.31
Libertarian	Douglas Randall	11,795	3.65
Write-in		71	0.02
Total votes		322,716	100
Republican hold			

=== 2020 ===
==== Republican primary ====
Colorado's 5th congressional district Republican primary, 2020
Party	Candidate	Votes	%
Republican	Doug Lamborn (incumbent)	104,302	100
Total votes		104,302	100

=== General ===
United States House of Representatives elections, 2020
Party	Candidate	Votes	%
Republican	Doug Lamborn (Incumbent)	249,013	57.59
Democratic	Jillian Freeland	161,600	37.37
Libertarian	Ed Duffett	14,777	3.42
Independent	Marcus Allen Murphy	3,708	0.86
Unity	Rebecca Keltie	3,309	0.77
Total votes		432,407	100
Republican hold			

=== 2022 ===
==== Republican primary ====
Colorado's 5th congressional district Republican primary, 2022
Party	Candidate	Votes	%
Republican	Doug Lamborn (incumbent)	46,178	47.32
Republican	Dave Williams	32,669	33.47
Republican	Rebecca Keltie	12,631	12.94
Republican	Andrew Heaton	6,121	6.27
Total votes		97,599	100

=== General ===
United States House of Representatives elections, 2022
Party	Candidate	Votes	%
Republican	Doug Lamborn (incumbent)	155,528	55.95
Democratic	David Torres	111,978	40.29
Libertarian	Brian Flanagan	7,079	2.55
American Constitution	Christopher Mitchell	3,370	1.21
Independent	Matthew Feigenbaum	9	0.00
Total votes		277,964	100
Republican hold			

U.S. House of Representatives
Preceded by Joel Hefley	Member of the U.S. House of Representatives from Colorado's 5th congressional district 2007–2025	Succeeded by Jeff Crank
U.S. order of precedence (ceremonial)
Preceded by Les AuCoin as Former US Representative	Order of precedence of the United States as Former US Representative	Succeeded by Earl Pomeroy as Former US Representative
