= United States House Armed Services Subcommittee on Seapower and Projection Forces =

Subcommittee of the US House of Representatives

Subcommittee of Committee on Armed Services
- Active United States House of Representatives; 119th Congress

Leadership
- Chair: Trent Kelly (R)
- Ranking Member: Joe Courtney (D)

Structure
- Seats: 18 (18 currently filled) 10/10 8/8
- Political parties: Majority (10): Republican (10); Minority (8): Democratic (8)

Meeting place
- 2216, Rayburn House Office Building; Washington, D.C. 20515

Phone number
- (202)-225-4151

House Armed Services Subcommittee on Seapower and Projection Forces is a subcommittee of the House Armed Services Committee in the United States House of Representatives.

The subcommittee's chair is Republican Trent Kelly of Mississippi and ranking member is Democrat Joe Courtney of Connecticut.

== Jurisdiction ==
The Seapower and Projection Forces Subcommittee exercises oversight and legislative jurisdiction over the United States Navy, United States Marine Corps, Navy Reserve equipment, and maritime programs.

The subcommittee does not have jurisdiction over strategic weapons (weapons of mass destruction), space or NASA, special operations, and information technology programs.

== Members, 119th Congress ==
| Majority | Minority |
|---|---|
| Trent Kelly, Mississippi, Chair; Rob Wittman, Virginia; Scott DesJarlais, Tennessee; Jack Bergman, Michigan; Ronny Jackson, Texas; Nancy Mace, South Carolina; Jen Kiggans, Virginia; James Moylan, Guam; Lance Gooden, Texas; Clay Higgins, Louisiana | Joe Courtney, Connecticut, Ranking Member; Donald Norcross, New Jersey; Ro Khanna, California; Jared Golden, Maine; Chris Deluzio, Pennsylvania; Sarah Elfreth, Maryland; George T. Whitesides, California; Eugene Vindman, Virginia |
Ex officio
| Mike Rogers, Alabama | Adam Smith, Washington |

== Historical membership rosters ==
=== 118th Congress ===
| Majority | Minority |
|---|---|
| Trent Kelly, Mississippi, Chair; Rob Wittman, Virginia; Scott DesJarlais, Tennessee; Mike Gallagher, Wisconsin; Jack Bergman, Michigan; Mike Johnson, Louisiana; Ronny Jackson, Texas; Nancy Mace, South Carolina; Jen Kiggans, Virginia; Mark Alford, Missouri | Joe Courtney, Connecticut, Ranking Member; John Garamendi, California; Donald Norcross, New Jersey; Jared Golden, Maine; Sara Jacobs, California; Chris Deluzio, Pennsylvania; Jimmy Panetta, California |
Ex officio
| Mike Rogers, Alabama | Adam Smith, Washington |

=== 115th Congress ===
| Majority | Minority |
|---|---|
| Rob Wittman, Virginia, Chairman; Mike Conaway, Texas; Vicky Hartzler, Missouri; Bradley Byrne, Alabama; Scott DesJarlais, Tennessee; Mike Gallagher, Wisconsin; Duncan D. Hunter, California; Paul Cook, California; Steve Knight, California; Ralph Abraham, Louisiana; Paul Mitchell, Michigan | Joe Courtney, Connecticut, Ranking Member; Susan A. Davis, California; James Langevin, Rhode Island; Madeleine Bordallo, Guam; John Garamendi, California; Donald Norcross, New Jersey; Seth Moulton, Massachusetts; Colleen Hanabusa, Hawaii; Donald McEachin, Virginia |
Ex officio
| Mac Thornberry, Texas | Adam Smith, Washington |

=== 116th Congress ===
| Majority | Minority |
|---|---|
| Joe Courtney, Connecticut, Chair; James Langevin, Rhode Island; Jim Cooper, Tennessee; Donald Norcross, New Jersey; Seth Moulton, Massachusetts; Filemon Vela Jr., Texas; Gil Cisneros, California; Mikie Sherrill, New Jersey; Katie Hill, California; Jared Golden, Maine; Elaine Luria, Virginia, Vice Chair | Rob Wittman, Virginia, Ranking Member; Mike Conaway, Texas; Mike Gallagher, Wisconsin; Jack Bergman, Michigan; Mike Waltz, Florida; Vicky Hartzler, Missouri; Paul Cook, California; Bradley Byrne, Alabama; Trent Kelly, Mississippi |
Ex officio
| Adam Smith, Washington | Mac Thornberry, Texas |

=== 117th Congress ===
| Majority | Minority |
|---|---|
| Joe Courtney, Connecticut, Chair; James Langevin, Rhode Island; Jim Cooper, Tennessee; Donald Norcross, New Jersey; Anthony Brown, Maryland; Filemon Vela Jr., Texas; Jared Golden, Maine, Vice Chair; Elaine Luria, Virginia; Sara Jacobs, California; Sylvia Garcia, Texas | Rob Wittman, Virginia, Ranking Member; Vicky Hartzler, Missouri; Sam Graves, Missouri; Trent Kelly, Mississippi; Mike Gallagher, Wisconsin; Jim Banks, Indiana; Jack Bergman, Michigan; Jerry Carl, Alabama |
Ex officio
| Adam Smith, Washington | Mike Rogers, Alabama |

== See also ==
- United States Senate Armed Services Subcommittee on SeaPower
