= United States House Armed Services Subcommittee on Strategic Forces =

US government committee

Subcommittee of Committee on Armed Services
- Active United States House of Representatives; 119th Congress

Leadership
- Chair: Scott DesJarlais (R)
- Ranking Member: Seth Moulton (D)

Structure
- Seats: 16 (16 currently filled) 9/9 7/7
- Political parties: Majority (9): Republican (9); Minority (7): Democratic (7)

Meeting place
- 2216, Rayburn House Office Building; Washington, D.C. 20515

Phone number
- (202)-225-4151

The House Armed Services Subcommittee on Strategic Forces is a subcommittee of the House Armed Services Committee in the United States House of Representatives.

The Chair of the subcommittee is Republican Scott DesJarlais of Tennessee and the Ranking Member is Democrat Seth Moulton of Massachusetts.

== Jurisdiction ==
The Strategic Forces Subcommittee exercises oversight and legislative jurisdiction over:

1. Strategic Forces (except deep strike systems)
2. space programs
3. ballistic missile defense
4. Department of Energy national security programs (except non-proliferation programs)

== Members, 119th Congress ==
| Majority | Minority |
|---|---|
| Scott DesJarlais, Tennessee, Chair; Joe Wilson, South Carolina; Mike Turner, Ohio; Don Bacon, Nebraska; Derrick Van Orden, Wisconsin; Mark Messmer, Indiana; Jeff Crank, Colorado; Abraham Hamadeh, Arizona | Seth Moulton, Massachusetts, Ranking Member; John Garamendi, California; Salud Carbajal, California; Gabe Vasquez, New Mexico; George T. Whitesides, California; Wesley Bell, Missouri |
Ex officio
| Mike Rogers, Alabama | Adam Smith, Washington |

== Historical membership rosters ==
=== 118th Congress ===
| Majority | Minority |
|---|---|
| Doug Lamborn, Colorado, Chair; Mike Turner, Ohio; Joe Wilson, South Carolina; Elise Stefanik, New York; Scott DesJarlais, Tennessee; Mike Waltz, Florida; Don Bacon, Nebraska; Jim Banks, Indiana; Dale Strong, Alabama | Seth Moulton, Massachusetts, Ranking Member; John Garamendi, California; Salud Carbajal, California; Ro Khanna, California; Donald Norcross, New Jersey; Chrissy Houlahan, Pennsylvania; Gabe Vasquez, New Mexico |
Ex officio
| Mike Rogers, Alabama | Adam Smith, Washington |

=== 115th Congress ===
| Majority | Minority |
|---|---|
| Mike Rogers, Alabama, Chairman; Trent Franks, Arizona; Doug Lamborn, Colorado; Duncan D. Hunter, California; Mo Brooks, Alabama; Mike Turner, Ohio; Mike Coffman, Colorado; Bradley Byrne, Alabama; Sam Graves, Missouri; Paul Mitchell, Michigan | Jim Cooper, Tennessee, Ranking Member; Susan Davis, California; Rick Larsen, Washington; John Garamendi, California; Beto O'Rourke, Texas; Donald Norcross, New Jersey; Ro Khanna, California; Colleen Hanabusa, Hawaii |
Ex officio
| Mac Thornberry, Texas | Adam Smith, Washington |

=== 116th Congress ===
| Majority | Minority |
|---|---|
| Jim Cooper, Tennessee, Chair; Susan Davis, California; Rick Larsen, Washington; John Garamendi, California; Jackie Speier, California; Seth Moulton, Massachusetts; Salud Carbajal, California; Ro Khanna, California; Bill Keating, Massachusetts; Kendra Horn, Oklahoma | Mike Turner, Ohio, Ranking Member; Joe Wilson, South Carolina; Rob Bishop, Utah; Mike Rogers, Alabama; Mo Brooks, Alabama; Bradley Byrne, Alabama; Scott DesJarlais, Tennessee; Liz Cheney, Wyoming |
Ex officio
| Adam Smith, Washington | Mac Thornberry, Texas |

=== 117th Congress ===
| Majority | Minority |
|---|---|
| Jim Cooper, Tennessee, Chair; James Langevin, Rhode Island; John Garamendi, California; Seth Moulton, Massachusetts; Salud Carbajal, California, 'Vice Chair; Ro Khanna, California; Joseph Morelle, New York; Jimmy Panetta, California | Mike Turner, Ohio, Ranking Member; Joe Wilson, South Carolina; Doug Lamborn, Colorado; Mo Brooks, Alabama; Elise Stefanik, New York; Scott DesJarlais, Tennessee; Liz Cheney, Wyoming; Mike Waltz, Florida |
Ex officio
| Adam Smith, Washington | Mike Rogers, Alabama |

== See also ==
- United States Senate Armed Services Subcommittee on Strategic Forces
