= Eugene Vindman =

American military officer and politician (born 1975)

- Євген Віндман
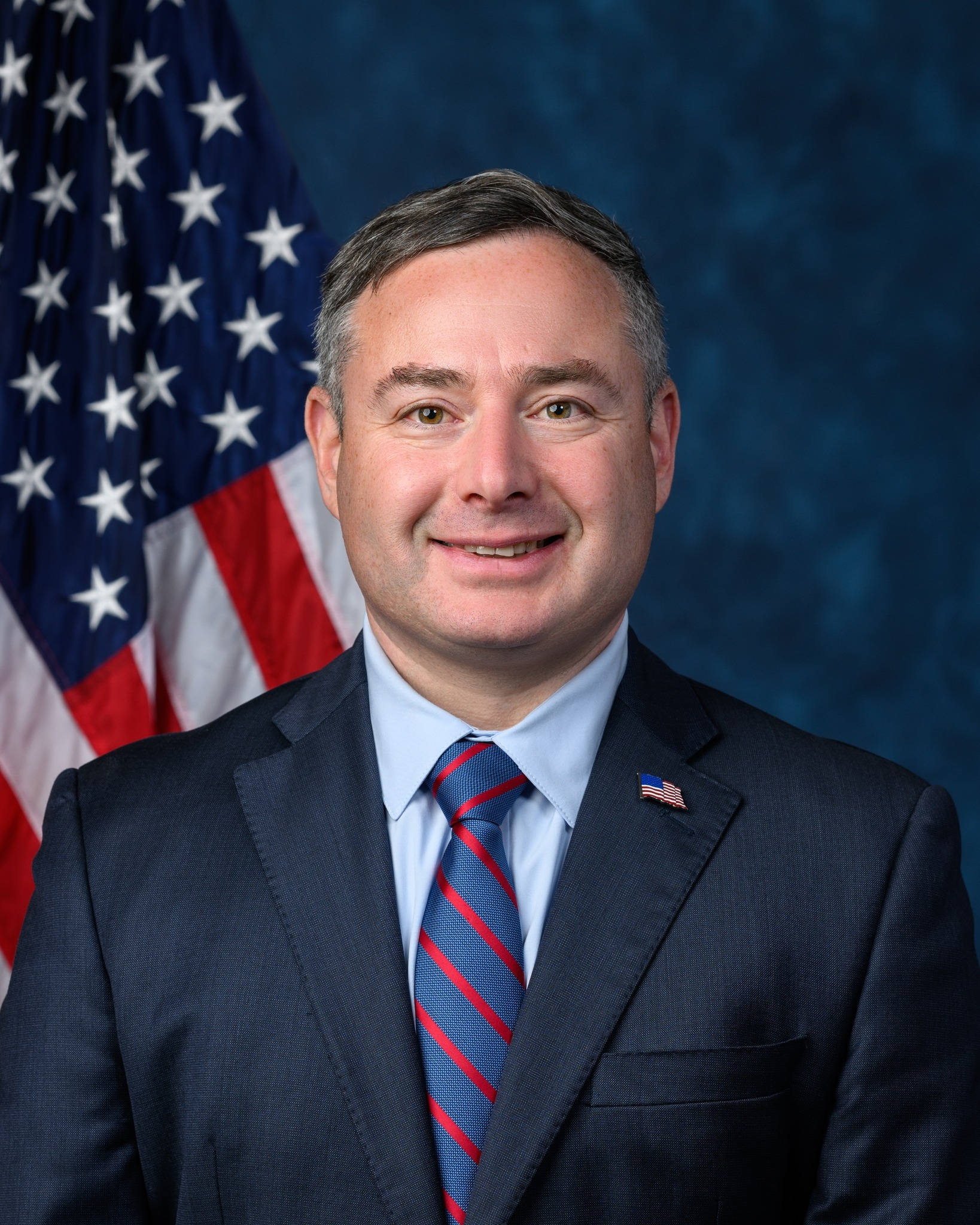
- Official portrait, 2024

Member of the U.S. House of Representatives from Virginia's 7th district
- Incumbent
- Assumed office January 3, 2025
- Preceded by: Abigail Spanberger

Personal details
- Born: Yevgeny Semyonovich Vindman; June 6, 1975 (age 51) Kyiv, Ukrainian SSR, Soviet Union
- Party: Democratic
- Spouse: Cindy Groff
- Children: 2
- Relatives: Alex Vindman (brother)
- Education: Binghamton University (BA); Central Michigan University (MS); University of Georgia (JD); Judge Advocate General’s Legal Center and School (LLM)
- Website: House website Campaign website

Military service
- Allegiance: United States
- Branch/service: United States Army
- Years of service: 1998–2022
- Rank: Lieutenant Colonel
- Unit: Judge Advocate General's Corps
- Battles/wars: Iraq War
- Awards: Defense Superior Service Medal; Legion of Merit; Meritorious Service Medal (6); Joint Service Commendation Medal; Army Commendation Medal (3); Army Achievement Medal (3)

Eugene Semyon Vindman (born Yevgeny Semyonovich Vindman; (Note: Ukrainian: Євген Семенович Віндман, romanized: Yevhen Semenovych Vindman) June 6, 1975) is an American politician, lawyer, and retired U.S. Army officer serving as the U.S. representative for Virginia's 7th congressional district since 2025. A member of the Democratic Party, he was a deputy legal advisor for the United States National Security Council (NSC) until he was reassigned on February 7, 2020.

Vindman came to national attention in October 2019 when his twin brother, Lieutenant Colonel Alexander Vindman, testified before the United States Congress regarding the Trump–Ukraine scandal. Because of his position on the NSC, Eugene had received Alexander's report of President Donald Trump's telephone call to Ukraine, which he later reported to senior White House lawyers. Alexander Vindman's testimony provided evidence that resulted in a charge of abuse of power in the first impeachment of Donald Trump.

In 2024, Vindman won the Democratic nomination for Virginia's 7th congressional district in the 2024 election. He defeated Republican Derrick Anderson in the general election, and assumed office on January 3, 2025.

== Early life and education ==
Yevgeny Semyonovich Vindman and his identical twin brother Alexander were born on June 6, 1975, to a Jewish family in the Ukrainian Soviet Socialist Republic, Soviet Union. After the death of their mother, the three-year-old twins and their older brother Leonid were brought by their father, Semyon (Simon) to New York in December 1979. Their father worked as a furniture mover when he arrived and taught himself English. The family lived in the Brighton Beach neighborhood of Brooklyn. Vindman appears briefly with his maternal grandmother in the 1985 Ken Burns documentary The Statue of Liberty.

In 1997, Vindman graduated from the State University of New York at Binghamton in Binghamton, New York, with a bachelor of arts degree in history. He later received a master of science degree in general administration from Central Michigan University, a juris doctor from the University of Georgia School of Law, and a master of laws from the Judge Advocate General's Legal Center and School.

== Military career ==
Vindman was commissioned as an officer in the United States Army after receiving his bachelor degree. He served for 25 years as a paratrooper, infantryman, and a Judge Advocate General's Corps attorney, and was deployed to Iraq.

Vindman retired from the Army in 2022. He retired at the rank of lieutenant colonel because he did not serve the full time required to retire as a colonel. Vindman's campaign literature has referred to him as a "Retired U.S. Colonel" or "Army Colonel Retired". After Vindman was questioned about the discrepancy, his campaign began to refer to him as a "former colonel". His military decorations include the Defense Superior Service Medal; the Legion of Merit; six Meritorious Service Medals; a Joint Service Commendation Medal; three Army Commendation Medals; and three Army Achievement Medals.

== National Security Council ==
During the Trump administration in 2018, Vindman was assigned as a deputy legal adviser to the National Security Council (NSC), where he was the senior ethics official. He was involved in reporting President Trump's attempt to coerce Ukraine into investigating former Vice President Biden and he faced retaliation by that Trump administration for his actions.

=== Trump telephone call to Zelenskyy ===
In the line of his duties on July 25, 2019, Alexander Vindman listened to a telephone call between Trump and Ukrainian President Volodymyr Zelenskyy and was concerned by the contents, saying that he "did not think it was proper to demand that a foreign government investigate a U.S. citizen", and "was worried about the implications for the U.S. Government's support of Ukraine". Alexander believed that the call would "undermine U.S. national security". Alexander immediately reported the call to Eugene Vindman, the lead ethics attorney and a deputy legal advisor, who recognized the serious legal ramification of the call, including violations of law, as well as the legal and political jeopardy Trump faced. Eugene Vindman advised that they both further report the call through channels to the lead counsel of the NSC, John Eisenberg.

Vindman had two more conversations with Eisenberg about the July 25, 2019, telephone call. The first follow-up conversation occurred on August 1, 2019. Vindman sought to clarify with Eisenberg their role and obligations as attorneys, and whether as attorneys they were duty-bound to represent the Office of the President of the United States or, the individual serving as President. Vindman had a second conversation with Eisenberg on August 5, 2019, when he conveyed his concern that Trump's request that Zelenskyy investigate Trump's political rival may have violated the Federal Bribery Statute, the Foreign Corrupt Practices Act, and federal election laws. Once knowledge of the call became public, both brothers received threats and denunciation and they reached out to the Army regarding the safety of their families.

=== Trump's first impeachment ===
Eugene helped his brother throughout President Trump's first impeachment, which went from December 18, 2019, to February 5, 2020, including by drafting the portion of the opening statement where Alexander Vindman assured their father that he had made the right decision in emigrating from the Soviet Union to the United States. Alexander stated, "In Russia, my act of ... offering public testimony involving the President would surely cost me my life. I am grateful for my father's brave act of hope 40 years ago and for the privilege of being an American citizen and public servant, where I can live free of fear for mine [sic] and my family's safety. Dad, my sitting here today, in the U.S. Capitol talking to our elected officials is proof that you made the right decision forty years ago to leave the Soviet Union and come here to United States of America in search of a better life for our family. Do not worry, I will be fine for telling the truth."

=== Trump alleged retaliation against Vindman ===
On February 10, 2020, then-Senate Minority Leader Chuck Schumer (D-NY) sent a letter in an apparent response to the firing of the two brothers that requested federal Inspectors General to investigate possible retaliation against "anyone who has made, or in the future makes, protected disclosures of presidential misconduct". On February 13, Trump's former chief of staff, retired Marine General John Kelly, defended Vindman's actions and testimony. "He did exactly what we teach them to do from cradle to grave. He went and told his boss what he just heard", Kelly said.

During a panel discussion in February 2020, at the Atlantic Council, Trump's National Security Advisor, Robert C. O'Brien said it was his decision to remove both Vindman brothers from the NSC staff and denied that the move was ordered by Trump in retaliation for Vindman's testimony. O'Brien also disputed that the removal from the NSC staff was a "firing", since both brothers remained active-duty Army officers. O'Brien said that their transfer was part of a larger NSA staff reduction. His remarks contradicted Trump, however, who tweeted that he had ousted Vindman for insubordination and for doing "a lot of bad things".

Vindman held the rank of colonel on active duty, but retired as a lieutenant colonel because he had not served the minimum requirement of three years service in grade in order to retain the rank in retirement. In 2022, his supporters called on President Joe Biden to allow Yevgeny to retire as a colonel. Vindman commented that retiring at the rank of colonel would not affect his retirement compensation and would be merely “honorific”. The Army declined to submit to Biden a request to adjust Vindman's retirement status, telling the media that time-in-grade waivers were extremely rare, with "only three such waivers for Army officers since 1997". Vindman's attorney, Mark Zaid, who is a founder of the nonprofit Whistleblower Aid that offers legal services to others such as Yevgeny, emphasized that the White House's failure to address the request about Vindman's retirement status might deter officials from speaking out about potential government wrongdoing in the future.

== Post-military career ==
Since 2022, Vindman has held the position of Director of Military Analysis and Prosecution Support for the Atrocity Crimes Advisory (ACA) group. The ACA was formed by the European Union, the United States, and the United Kingdom as an operational hub coordinating assistance to the Office of the Prosecutor General of Ukraine. This collaboration aims to investigate and prosecute those responsible for war crimes committed on Ukrainian soil.

In March 2023, Eugene Vindman, together with his twin brother Alexander Vindman, initiated the Trident Support project. Its primary goal is to set up a weapon maintenance and training facility within Ukraine. Within Trident Support, the Vindman brothers aim to enlist 100–200 adept Western contractors to collaborate with Ukrainian forces close to the front lines, offering training on mending battle-affected equipment provided by Western countries.

== U.S. House of Representatives ==
=== Election ===
==== 2024 ====
In November 2023, Vindman announced that he would run for the United States House of Representatives in Virginia's 7th District, where incumbent Democrat Abigail Spanberger was not seeking reelection. Vindman received endorsements from Adam Schiff, former Under Secretary of the Army Patrick Murphy, and the editorial board of The Washington Post.

Despite being a newcomer to politics, Vindman was able to fundraise based on his national profile and quickly became a frontrunner in the Democratic primary. He raised $5 million and had $876,000 on hand as of May 29, 2024, in addition to a combined $1.3 million in independent expenditures from cryptocurrency advocacy group Protect Progress PAC and VoteVets. In contrast, Vindman's national profile and disconnect from local politics was being criticized regularly by local Democratic activists and elected officials. In April 2024, Vindman also was criticized on social media after he was photographed alongside supporters in a now-deleted post to Twitter holding a flag used during Virginia's Confederate period.

On June 18, 2024, Vindman won the Democratic primary. On November 5, 2024, Vindman won the general election, defeating Republican Derrick Anderson.

==== 2026 ====
Vindman ran for re-election in 2026. He had no Democratic primary opponent. On November 3, 2026, Vindman won a second term in Virginia's 7th Congressional District, defeating Republican Doug Ollivant.

=== Tenure ===
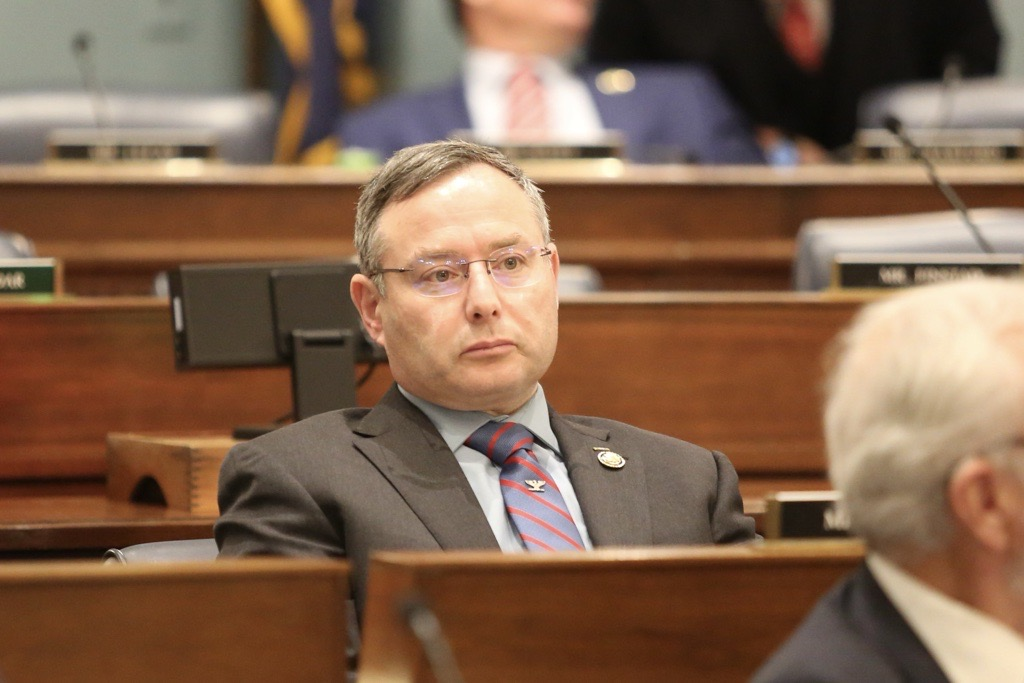
Vindman at a meeting of the United States House Committee on Agriculture

Vindman was named as a member of the United States House Committee on Agriculture and the United States Armed Services Committee for the 119th United States Congress.

Vindman expressed strong opposition to U.S. actions in the 2026 Iran war, arguing the war has "no legal justification under domestic and international law". On March 5, 2026, Vindman voted in favor of H.Con.Res. 38, the War Powers Resolution aimed at reasserting congressional authority over U.S. involvement in the war.

Vindman was one of eight Democrats to join Republicans in passing the Stopping Indoctrination and Protecting Kids Act, which mandated that transgender youth be outed to their parents by school professionals, and which would prohibit schools from teaching any concept related to transgender topics.

=== Committee assignments ===
- Committee on Agriculture
  - Subcommittee on Conservation, Research, and Biotechnology
  - Subcommittee on Commodity Markets, Digital Assets, and Rural Development (Vice Ranking Member)
- Committee on Armed Services
  - Subcommittee on Cyber, Information Technologies, and Innovation
  - Subcommittee on Seapower and Projection Forces

=== Caucus memberships ===
- Congressional Equality Caucus
- Labor Caucus
- New Democrat Coalition
- Democratic Veterans Caucus
- Bipartisan Rural Health Caucus
- Congressional Ukraine Caucus
- Federal Workforce Caucus
- Future Forum
- Congressional Lowering Utility Bills Caucus

== Personal life ==
Vindman is married to Cindy Vindman (née Groff). They have two children.

== Electoral history ==
=== 2024 ===
Democratic primary results
Party	Candidate	Votes	%
Democratic	Eugene Vindman	17,263	49.3
Democratic	Elizabeth Guzmán	5,283	15.1
Democratic	Briana Sewell	4,706	13.4
Democratic	Andrea Bailey	4,381	12.5
Democratic	Margaret Franklin	2,034	5.8
Democratic	Carl Bedell	738	2.1
Democratic	Clifford Heinzer	621	1.8
Total votes		35,026	100.0

2024 Virginia's 7th congressional district election
Party	Candidate	Votes	%
Democratic	Eugene Vindman	203,336	51.2
Republican	Derrick Anderson	192,847	48.5
Write-in		1,116	0.3
Total votes		397,299	100.0
Democratic hold			

== See also ==
- List of Jewish members of the United States Congress

== Notes ==
U.S. House of Representatives
Preceded by Abigail Spanberger	Member of the U.S. House of Representatives from Virginia's 7th congressional district 2025–present	Incumbent
U.S. order of precedence (ceremonial)
Preceded by Derek Tran	United States representatives by seniority 421st	Succeeded by George T. Whitesides
