= Alex Vindman =

American Army officer (born 1975)

- Олександр Віндман
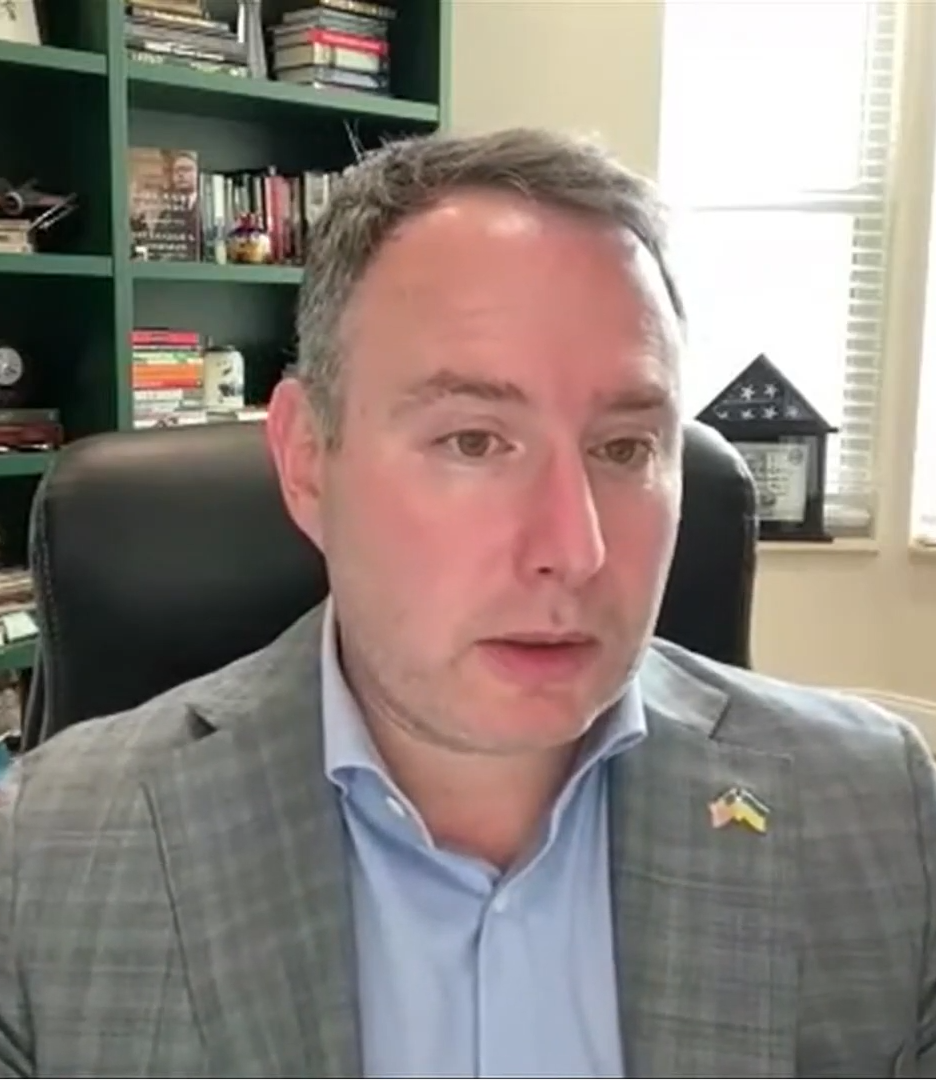
- Vindman in 2024

Personal details
- Born: Aleksandr Semyonovich Vindman; June 6, 1975 (age 51) Kyiv, Ukrainian SSR, Soviet Union (now Ukraine)
- Party: Democratic
- Spouse: Rachel Vindman
- Children: 1
- Relatives: Eugene Vindman (brother)
- Education: Binghamton University (BA); Harvard University (MA); Johns Hopkins University (MAIA, DIA)

Military service
- Branch/service: United States Army
- Years of service: 1999–2020
- Rank: Lieutenant Colonel
- Battles/wars: Iraq War
- Awards: Legion of Merit (2); Purple Heart; Defense Meritorious Service Medal (2); Army Commendation Medal (4); Army Achievement Medal (2); Army Valorous Unit Award; Joint Meritorious Unit Award; Navy Unit Commendation; Republic of Korea Presidential Unit Citation

Alexander Semyon Vindman (born Aleksandr Semyonovich Vindman, (Note: Russian: Александр Семёнович Виндман; Ukrainian: Олександр Семенович Віндман, romanized: Oleksandr Semenovych Vindman) June 6, 1975) is a retired United States Army lieutenant colonel who served as the Director of European Affairs for the National Security Council (NSC) until 2020. He came to national attention in 2019 as a witness in Congress's impeachment inquiry into Donald Trump during the Trump–Ukraine scandal. In his testimony, he described concerns he had previously reported regarding a call between President Donald Trump and Ukrainian President Volodymyr Zelenskyy that contributed to the abuse of power charge in the first impeachment of Trump.

Vindman was commissioned in 1999 as an infantry officer in the Army. He served in the Iraq War, where he was wounded by an improvised explosive device in 2004 and received the Purple Heart. He later became a foreign area officer specializing in Eurasia and was appointed Director of European Affairs at the NSC in 2018. He retired from the Army in 2020 after 21 years of service following delays to his promotion to colonel and actions taken by the Trump administration in response to his testimony before Congress.

In 2022, Vindman filed an unsuccessful lawsuit against several Trump allies alleging retaliation for his congressional testimony. In 2026, he unsuccessfully sought the Democratic nomination for Florida's United States Senate special election; the primary nomination went to Angie Nixon in what has been characterized as a major upset.

== Early life and education ==
Alexander Semyon Vindman was born on June 6, 1975, in the Ukrainian Soviet Socialist Republic, Soviet Union, to a Jewish family. He has a twin brother Yevgeny (Eugene). After the death of their mother from cancer, their father Semyon (Simon) immigrated to the United States with them and their older brother Leonid in December 1979. The family settled in the Brighton Beach neighborhood of Brooklyn, where the Vindman brothers were raised. Many Russian immigrants settled there in the late 20th century. He graduated from Franklin Delano Roosevelt High School in 1993.

In 1998, Vindman graduated from the State University of New York at Binghamton with a Bachelor of Arts degree in history. Influenced by his older brother Leonid, who had participated in the Reserve Officers' Training Corps (ROTC), Vindman completed the program at Cornell University while studying at Binghamton. He was commissioned as a second lieutenant in the Army's Infantry Branch in January 1999.

Vindman later received a Master of Arts degree from Harvard University in Russian, Eastern European, and Central Asian studies. He earned a Master of International Affairs in 2021 and a Doctor of International Affairs in 2022 from the School of Advanced International Studies at Johns Hopkins University. He speaks Ukrainian and Russian.

== Military career ==
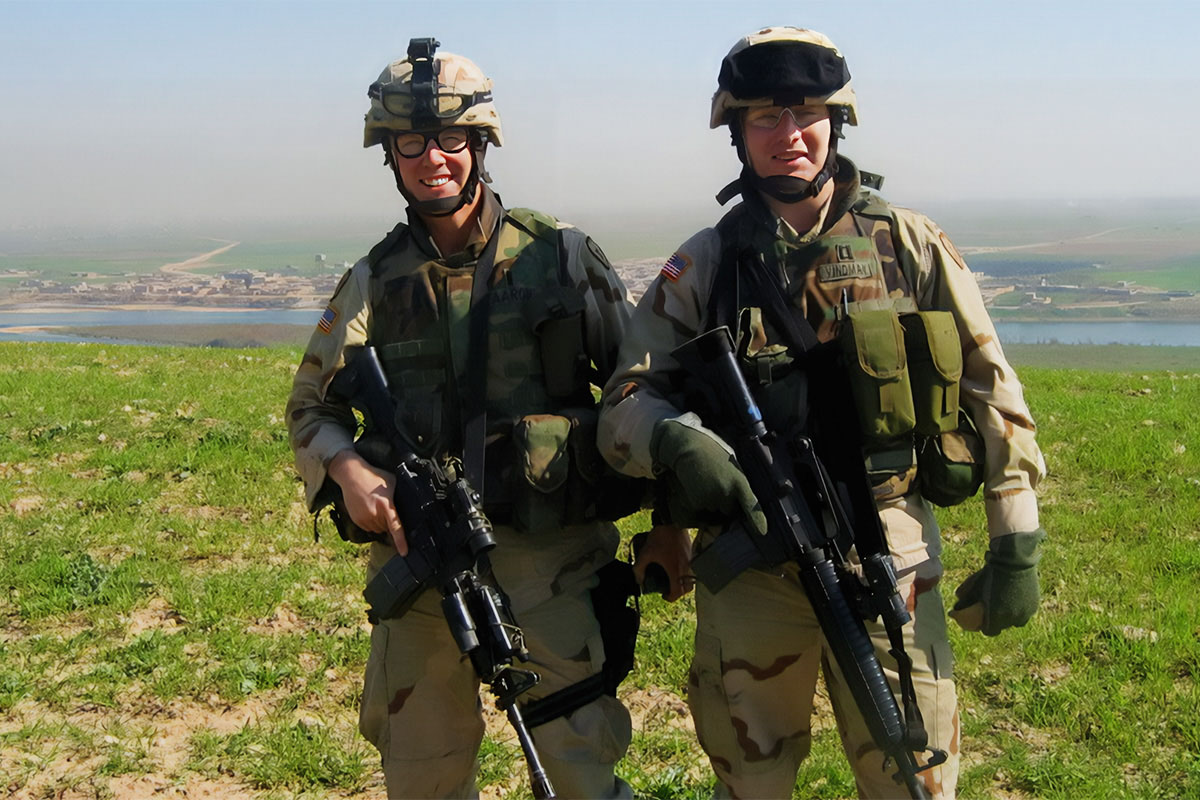
Vindman and a friend on patrol in Mosul during the Iraq War, 2005

After being commissioned into the Army, Vindman completed the Infantry Officer Basic Course (IOBC) at Fort Benning, Georgia, in 1999. The next year he was sent to South Korea, where he served with the 1st Battalion, 506th Infantry Regiment near the Korean Demilitarized Zone and led an anti-armor platoon. Following his tour in South Korea, he completed Ranger School and was assigned to Fort Lewis, Washington, where he served on the brigade staff as a training officer.

Vindman later deployed to Iraq as a battalion assistant operations officer with 1st Battalion, 5th Infantry Regiment from September 2004 to September 2005 during the Iraq War. In October 2004, he was leading a reconnaissance patrol near Fallujah, when he was wounded by a roadside bomb. He received a Purple Heart and continued his deployment. Following his deployment, he served in Germany, where he commanded Apache Troop, 1st Squadron, 2nd Cavalry Regiment. He was promoted to the rank of major in 2008.

In 2008, Vindman entered the Army's Foreign Area Officer program and specialized in Eurasian affairs. After completing language and regional studies, he served as a foreign area officer at the U.S. Embassy in Kyiv, Ukraine, and later served as an assistant army attaché at the U.S. Embassy in Moscow, Russia. Returning to Washington, D.C. he was then appointed a politico-military affairs officer focused on Russia for the Chairman of the Joint Chiefs of Staff and promoted to lieutenant colonel. Vindman served on the Joint Staff at the Pentagon from September 2015 to July 2018.

During his Army career, Vindman earned the Ranger Tab, Combat Infantryman Badge, Expert Infantryman Badge, and Parachutist Badge. He also received four Army Commendation Medals, two Defense Meritorious Service Medals, and two Legion of Merit awards.

== National Security Council ==
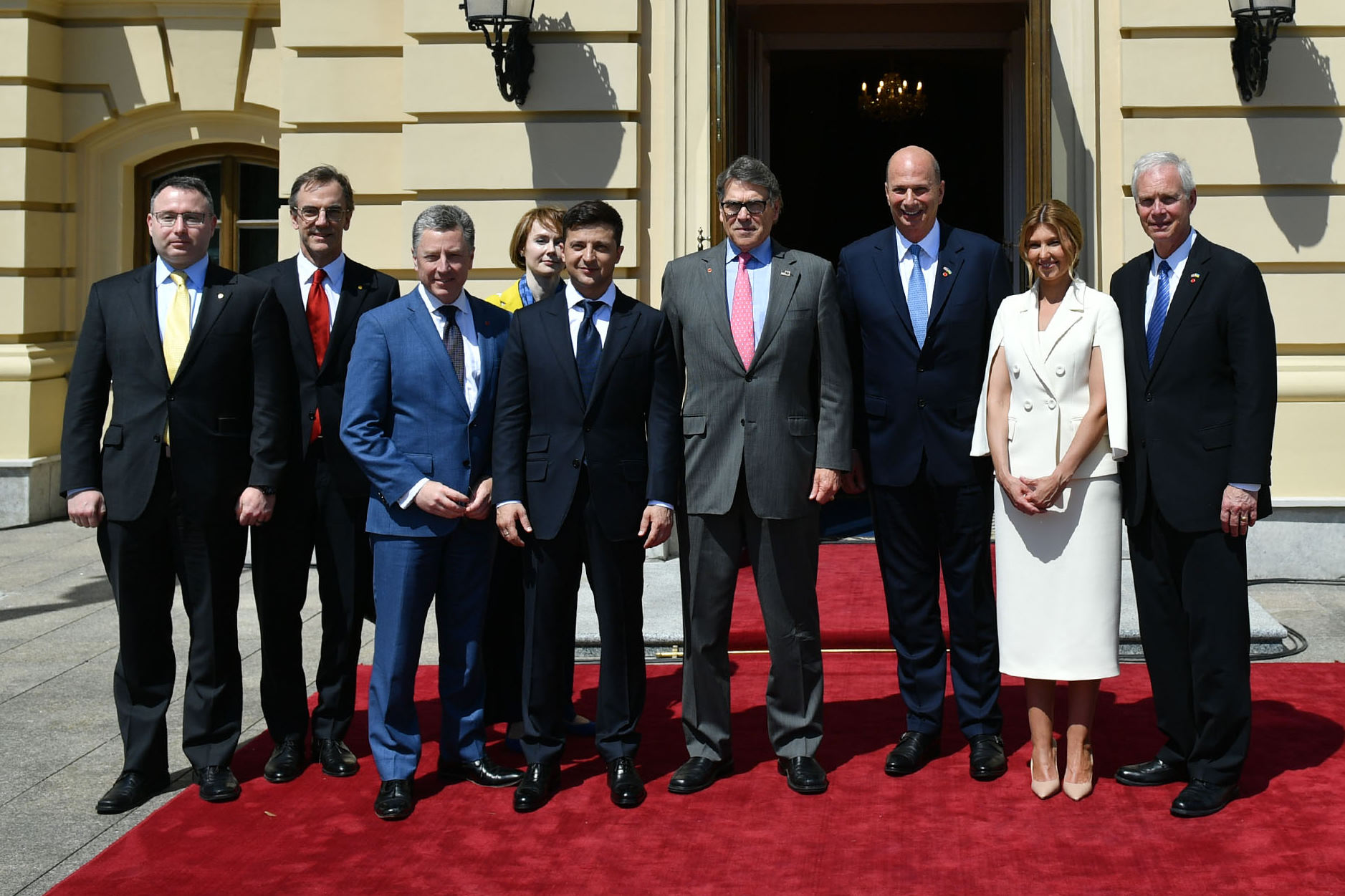
Vindman (far left) with the Presidential delegation at the 2019 inauguration of Ukrainian president Volodymyr Zelenskyy

In July 2018, Vindman accepted an appointment with the National Security Council. In his role on the NSC, Vindman became part of the U.S. delegation at the inauguration of Ukraine's newly elected president, Volodymyr Zelenskyy. The five-member delegation, led by Rick Perry, United States Secretary of Energy, also included Kurt Volker, then U.S. Special Representative for Ukraine Negotiations; Gordon Sondland, United States Ambassador to the European Union, and Joseph Pennington, then acting chargé d'affaires.

Vindman was subpoenaed to testify before Congressional investigators on October 29, 2019, as part of the U.S. House of Representatives' impeachment inquiry against Donald Trump. He was the first White House official to testify who was on a July 25, 2019, telephone call between President Trump and Ukrainian President Volodymyr Zelenskyy, in which Trump asked Zelenskyy to investigate former Vice President Joe Biden's son Hunter Biden, while his father was campaigning for president. Vindman's testimony corroborated previous testimony from Fiona Hill, his former supervisor, and William B. Taylor Jr., acting Ambassador to Ukraine.

Vindman's opening statement before Congress on October 28, 2019

On October 28, 2019, Vindman's opening statement to the House Intelligence Committee, House Foreign Affairs Committee, and House Oversight Committee was released, ahead of his testimony on the following day. Vindman testified that: "In Spring of 2019, I became aware of outside influencers promoting a false and alternative narrative of Ukraine inconsistent with the consensus views of the interagency", which was "harmful to U.S. national security" and also "undermined U.S. Government efforts to expand cooperation with Ukraine". He also stated regarding U.S.–Ukraine relations: "Our partnership is rooted in the idea that free citizens should be able to exercise their democratic rights, choose their own destiny, and live in peace," and that "it has been a great honor to serve the American people and a privilege to work in the White House and on the National Security Council".

Vindman said that he was concerned by two events, both of which he objected to with senior officials in real time, and which he reported to the National Security Council's lead attorney. The first event occurred at a July 10 meeting between Ukraine's then Secretary of National Security and Defense Council Oleksandr Danylyuk, and then US National Security Advisor John Bolton, at which Ambassadors Volker and Sondland, and Energy Secretary Rick Perry were in attendance, and at which Sondland asked Ukraine to launch investigations into the Bidens in order to get a meeting with President Trump. Vindman states that Bolton cut the meeting short, and that both Vindman and Hill told Ambassador Sondland that his comments were inappropriate and reported their concerns to the lead counsel of the NSC.

The second event was during a July 25 telephone call between Presidents Trump and Zelenskyy. Vindman states, "I was concerned by the call. I did not think it was proper to demand that a foreign government investigate a U.S. citizen, and I was worried about the implications for the U.S. Government's support of Ukraine. I realized that if Ukraine pursued an investigation into the Bidens and Burisma, it would likely be interpreted as a partisan play which would undoubtedly result in Ukraine losing the bipartisan support it has thus far maintained. This would all undermine U.S. national security." Vindman also stated that he reported his concern to the NSC's lead counsel, John Eisenberg.

External videos
- Testimony of Vindman and Jennifer Williams to the House Intelligence Committee, November 19, 2019, C-SPAN

Vindman later testified in person before the U.S. House of Representatives on November 19, 2019. In his testimony, Vindman stated that in the course of his official duties and standard NSC coordination obligations, he provided a summary of the call via classified means to two core members of his policy committee, one of whom was an intelligence official, concluding that the President's "demand" for an investigation was "improper". Because of his testimony, Vindman was denounced by Trump and repeatedly attacked by Republican lawmakers and television commentators. As a result, he reached out to the Army regarding his and his family's safety.

In his opening statement, Vindman assured his father that he had made the right decision in emigrating from the Soviet Union to the United States. Vindman said, "In Russia, my act of... offering public testimony involving the President would surely cost me my life. I am grateful for my father's brave act of hope 40 years ago and for the privilege of being an American citizen and public servant, where I can live free of fear for mine [sic] and my family's safety. Dad, my sitting here today, in the U.S. Capitol talking to our elected officials is proof that you made the right decision forty years ago to leave the Soviet Union and come here to United States of America in search of a better life for our family. Do not worry, I will be fine for telling the truth."

On February 7, 2020, Vindman told NSC colleagues he expected to leave the White House's National Security Council to return to the Department of Defense months ahead of his scheduled return to the Army in the summer of 2020. Trump earlier had implied he might remove Vindman from his post. According to his attorney, later that day Vindman was fired and escorted out of the White House. At the same time, his twin brother, Lieutenant Colonel Yevgeny Vindman, also was escorted off the White House grounds. Both had been slated for reassignment within the Army. Subsequent news reports indicated that Vindman had been chosen to attend the in-residence course at the United States Army War College during its 2020–2021 session and for promotion to Colonel.

On February 10, 2020, Senate Minority Leader Chuck Schumer (D-NY) sent a letter in an apparent response to the removal of the two brothers that requested federal Inspectors General investigate possible retaliation against "anyone who has made, or in the future makes, protected disclosures of presidential misconduct". On February 13, Trump's former chief of staff, retired Marine General John Kelly, defended Vindman's actions and testimony. "He did exactly what we teach them to do from cradle to grave. He went and told his boss what he just heard", Kelly said.

During a panel discussion held on February 11, 2020, at the Atlantic Council, the president's National Security Advisor, Robert C. O'Brien said that it was his decision to transfer both Vindman brothers back to the Army for re-assignment and he denied that the move was ordered by Trump in retaliation for Vindman's testimony. "I can absolutely tell you that they were not retaliated against", O'Brien told the panel. O'Brien also disputed the move as being characterized as "fired" since both brothers remained on active duty. O'Brien said that their transfer was part of a larger NSA staff reduction. He was contradicted by Trump, who tweeted that he had ousted Vindman for insubordination and for doing "a lot of bad things".

On July 2, 2020, Senator Tammy Duckworth announced that she intended to block Senate confirmation of more than one thousand military promotions unless defense secretary Mark Esper provided written confirmation that the Trump administration would not continue to block Vindman's promotion to colonel. Less than a week later, in order to avoid a mandatory three-year additional duty service obligation (ADSO), with the continued delay in promotion of hundreds of his peers, along with the knowledge that the White House Chief of Staff Mark Meadows had compelled a highly irregular Army investigation into Vindman and berated the Secretaries of the Defense and the Army for considering his promotion, Vindman announced through his attorney that he would be retiring from the U.S. military. His attorney, David Pressman said that "a campaign of bullying, intimidation, and retaliation" by the Trump administration was the reason for his client's retirement.

== Post-military career ==
=== Academic and policy work ===
In 2020, Vindman was appointed as the first Pritzker Military Fellow of the Pritzker Military Foundation. For two years, this fellowship supported Vindman's research, writing, and public discourse on subjects including national security, defense, civil-military relations, and public service. In 2021, Vindman served as a Visiting Fellow at the University of Pennsylvania’s foreign policy center, Perry World House. Starting in 2023, Vindman took on roles as a Hauser Leader and Senior Fellow at the Harvard Kennedy School Center for Public Leadership.

In November 2020, Vindman joined the staff of the national security blog Lawfare as the Pritzker Military Fellow of the Pritzker Military Foundation. In 2021, he assumed the position of an executive board member of the Renew Democracy Initiative. After January 2022, Vindman served as a senior advisor for VoteVets and began directing the Vet Voice Foundation’s national security and defense think tank, the Institute for Informed American Leadership (IIAL). He also remained a senior fellow at the SAIS Foreign Policy Institute. He was a senior fellow at the Kettering Foundation, an American non-partisan research foundation from 2024-2025.

=== Memoir and lawsuit ===
In 2021, Vindman published a memoir entitled Here, Right Matters which reached No. 2 on the New York Times Best Seller list. In it he talks about his role as a primary witness in Donald Trump’s first impeachment trial. He said speaking out about the July 25 call between Trump and Volodymyr Zelenskyy was not merely a decision, but a duty rooted in his citizenship and service in the armed forces.

In February 2022, Vindman filed a lawsuit alleging that the defendants disseminated false allegations about him, including claims that he was a spy for Ukraine, leaked classified data to damage his reputation, falsely charged him with perjury, and orchestrated the dismissal of him and his twin brother Eugene from their positions at the White House. The defendants in the lawsuit were Donald Trump Jr., Rudy Giuliani, former White House deputy chief of staff Dan Scavino, and former White House deputy communications director Julia Hahn. On November 8, 2022, the lawsuit was dismissed by Federal Judge James E. Boasberg, who noted that "political hackery alone" isn't a violation of the law.

=== Ukraine support ===
After Russia's full-scale invasion on February 24, 2022, Vindman expressed support for effectively countering Russian malignant influence and Russia's military aggression by fully supporting Ukraine. He conducted lectures on the Russo-Ukrainian War at the Harvard Ukrainian Research Institute in Cambridge, Massachusetts, the Ford School at the University of Michigan in Ann Arbor, and the University of Alberta in Edmonton.

In 2022, with Daniel Lubetzky, Alexander Vindman became the co-chair of the Global Democracy Ambassador Scholarship, which helps Ukrainian students who pursue their undergraduate degrees in the United States and abroad. The objective of the scholarship is helping Ukrainians continue their studies and educate their global peers on the fragility and importance of democracy. The program granted $1 million to support an initial group of Ukrainian scholars.

In March 2023, the Vindman brothers launched Trident Support, a project with the primary objective to establish a weapon maintenance and training facility in Ukraine. Through Trident Support, the Vindman brothers hope to recruit 100–200 skilled Western contractors to work alongside Ukrainian troops near the front lines in providing training on how to repair battle-damaged equipment donated by Western nations. The project's goal is to improve Ukraine’s defense capacity and accelerate the repair of military equipment so the equipment no longer has to be taken from Ukraine to Poland or other NATO countries for major repairs.

== 2026 U.S. Senate campaign ==
On January 27, 2026, Vindman announced his candidacy for the U.S. Senate seat being contested in Florida's 2026 special election to complete the term of Marco Rubio, who resigned from the seat in January 2025 to become the U. S. Secretary of State. Vindman sought the Democratic nomination in the race, and was endorsed by the Miami Herald. Although he vastly outspent his Democratic primary opponent Angie Nixon she won in a major upset.

== Personal life ==
Vindman is married to Rachel Vindman, née Cartmill. They have a daughter and live in Broward County, Florida.

His identical twin brother, Yevgeny "Eugene" Vindman, is a member of Congress and retired Army lieutenant colonel. Their older brother, Leonid Vindman, also served in the Army.

Vindman appeared briefly with his twin brother and maternal grandmother in Ken Burns's 1985 documentary The Statue of Liberty. He also appeared in the HBO series Curb Your Enthusiasm, including the 2021 episode, "The Mormon Advantage" and the 2024 series finale, "No Lessons Learned".

== Military awards ==
At his retirement, Vindman received two Legions of Merit. Vindman's additional awards and decorations include the Purple Heart; Defense Meritorious Service Medal with bronze oak leaf cluster (2nd award); Meritorious Service Medal; Army Commendation Medal with three oak leaf clusters (4th award); Army Achievement Medal with two oak leaf clusters (3rd award); National Defense Service Medal; Global War on Terrorism Expeditionary Medal; Global War on Terrorism Service Medal; Korea Defense Service Medal; Army Service Ribbon; Overseas Service Ribbon (4th award); Valorous Unit Award; Joint Meritorious Unit Award; Navy Unit Commendation; National Intelligence Meritorious Unit Citation; and Republic of Korea Presidential Unit Citation. He is a recipient of the Combat Infantryman Badge; Expert Infantryman Badge; Ranger Tab; Basic Parachutist Badge; the Presidential Service Badge; and Joint Chiefs of Staff Identification Badge.

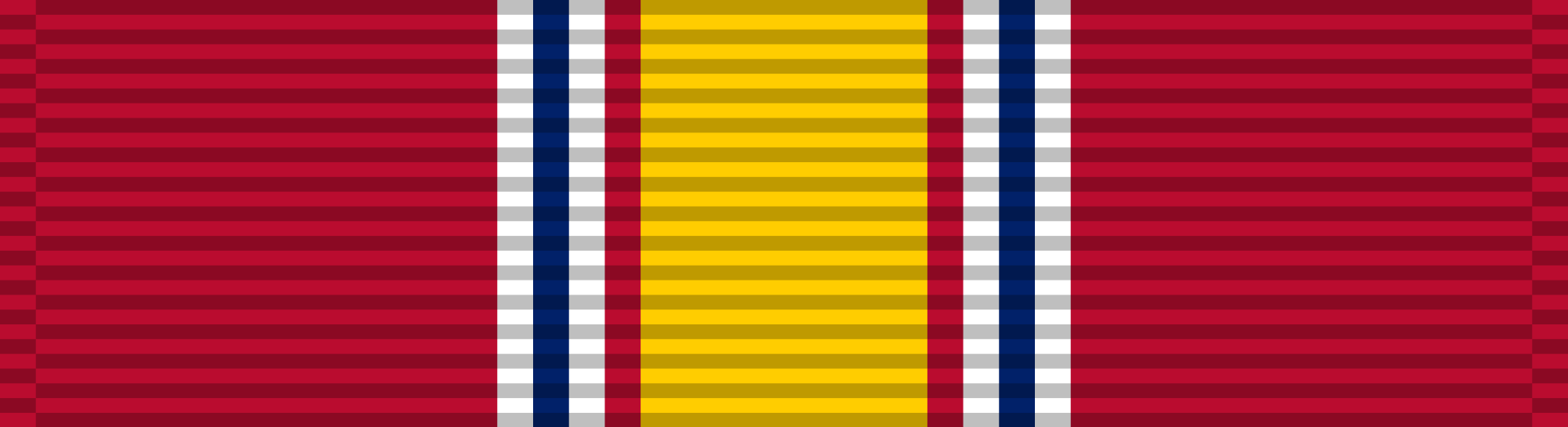

== Filmography ==
=== Television ===
Year	Title	Role	Notes
2021, 2024	Curb Your Enthusiasm	Himself	Episodes: "The Mormon Advantage", "No Lessons Learned"

== Works ==
- Vindman, Alexander S. (August 3, 2021). Here, Right Matters: An American Story. Harper. ISBN 978-0063079427. OCLC 1261635035.
- Vindman, Alexander (February 25, 2025). The Folly of Realism: How the West Deceived Itself About Russia and Betrayed Ukraine. New York: PublicAffairs. ISBN 9781541705043. OCLC 1482617958.

== See also ==
- First impeachment inquiry against Donald Trump
