= Paul Mitchell (politician) =

American politician (1956–2021)

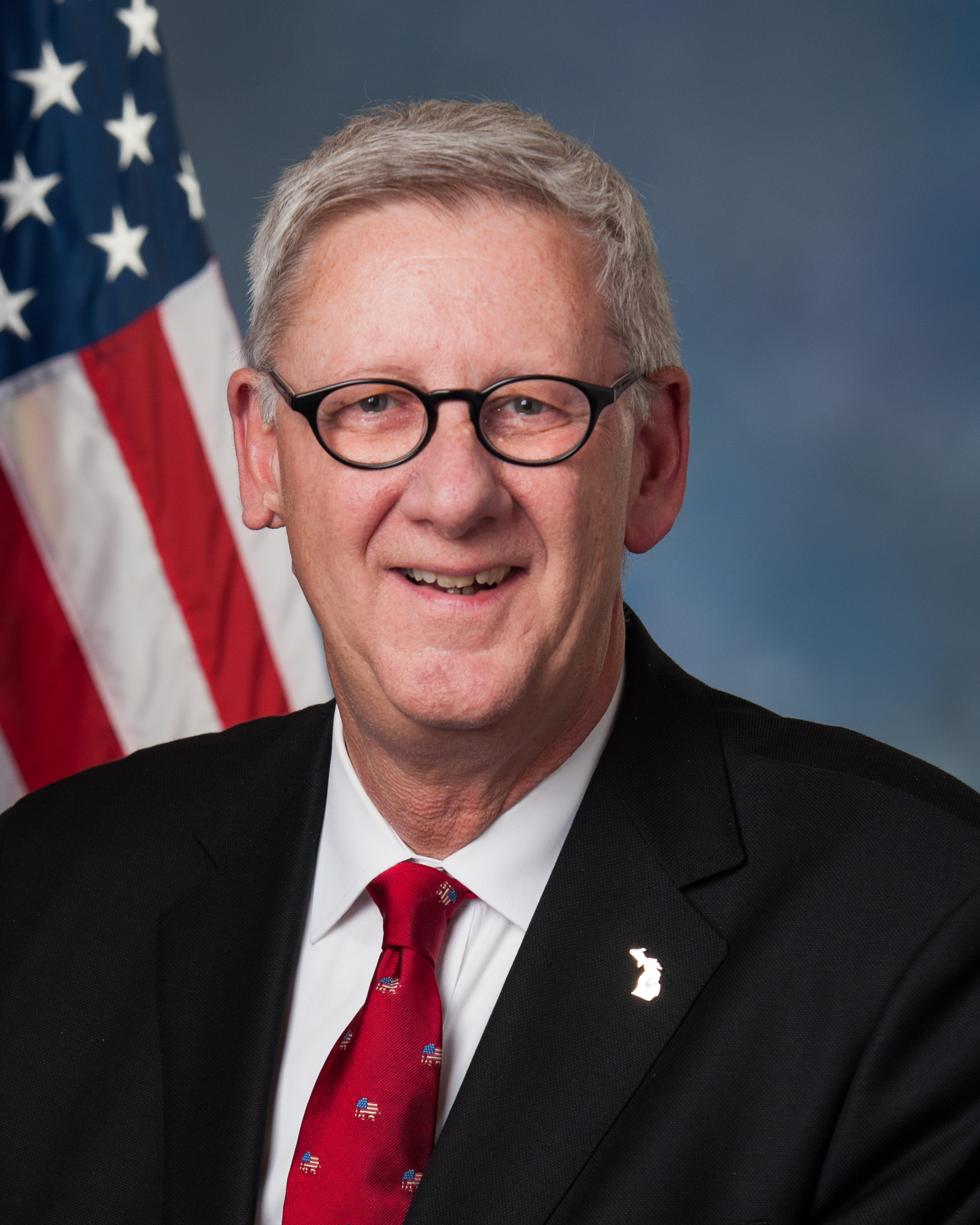

Member of the U.S. House of Representatives from Michigan's 10th district
- In office January 3, 2017 – January 3, 2021
- Preceded by: Candice Miller
- Succeeded by: Lisa McClain

Personal details
- Born: November 14, 1956 Boston, Massachusetts, U.S.
- Died: August 15, 2021 (aged 64)
- Party: Republican (until 2020); Independent (2020–2021)
- Spouse: Sherry Mitchell (m. 2008)
- Children: 6
- Education: Michigan State University (BA)

Paul Mitchell III (November 14, 1956 – August 15, 2021) was an American businessman and politician who served as the U.S. representative for Michigan's 10th congressional district from 2017 to 2021. A member of the Republican Party for most of his Congressional tenure, he left the party in December 2020, three weeks prior to his departure from Congress, and became an independent. In July 2019, Mitchell announced that he would not run for re-election in 2020 to spend more time with his family.

== Early life, family and education ==
Mitchell was born in Boston, Massachusetts. The oldest of six children, he was raised in Waterford Township, Michigan.

Mitchell graduated from Michigan State University with a bachelor's degree in 1978.

== Career before politics ==
Paul Mitchell previously owned and operated Ross Medical Education Center. He ran for the 32nd district seat in the Michigan State Senate in 2013 to succeed Roger Kahn, but withdrew from the race. He became the chairman of the Faith and Freedom Coalition of Michigan, a conservative nonprofit foundation. Mitchell led a campaign opposed to Proposal 1, a ballot proposition proposing a tax plan for roads, on the May 2015 ballot.

== U.S. House of Representatives ==
Mitchell ran for the United States House of Representatives in Michigan's 4th congressional district in 2014, losing the Republican Party primary election to John Moolenaar. He moved to Michigan's 10th congressional district in 2015 to run for the House of Representatives in that district, following Candice Miller's decision not to run for reelection. He won the primary, defeating Phil Pavlov and Alan Sanborn. Mitchell won the general election, defeating Frank Accavitti.

Mitchell assumed office on January 3, 2017. He was a member of the Republican Study Committee. He voted in favor of the unsuccessful American Health Care Act of 2017, which would have repealed the Affordable Care Act and replaced it with another program.

In July 2019, Mitchell announced he would not seek a third term in Congress, citing the "rhetoric and vitriol" of the federal government, a desire to spend more time with his family, and health issues.

Shortly after a post on Twitter was sent by President Donald Trump on July 14, telling four female, minority, first-term congressional representatives to "go back" to their countries of origin, Mitchell called a fellow House GOP leader and asked him to persuade Trump to cease his rhetoric. Mitchell said, "It's the wrong thing for a leader to say", and he told the leader, "It's politically damaging to the party, to the country." A few days later, while Mitchell waited to go on to a prime-time television network appearance, he saw a clip of Trump rally attendees chanting, "send her back," aimed at one of the congresswomen, Ilhan Omar. Mitchell asked an aide, "How do I even respond to this on TV?" For Mitchell, the final straw was the refusal of Trump staffers to listen. Mitchell begged Vice President Mike Pence and the Vice President's Chief of Staff Marc Short to arrange a one-on-one conversation between Mitchell and Trump to address his misgivings.

On November 29, 2020, Mitchell tweeted a response to a tweet by Trump claiming rigged elections: "Oh my God. . @realDonaldTrump Please for the sake of our Nation please drop these arguments without evidence or factual basis. #stopthestupid". The hashtag is a reference to "stop the steal", a slogan used by Trump supporters who claimed that the election had been stolen from Trump.

On December 14, 2020, during an interview with CNN's Jake Tapper, Mitchell announced he would no longer continue as a member of the Republican Party and would serve out the rest of his term in Congress as an independent.

=== Committee assignments ===
- Committee on Armed Services
  - Subcommittee on Seapower and Projection Forces
  - Subcommittee on Strategic Forces
- Committee on Oversight and Government Reform
  - Subcommittee on Health Care, Benefits and Administrative Rules
  - Subcommittee on Information Technology
- Committee on Transportation and Infrastructure
  - Subcommittee on Aviation (Vice Chair)
  - Subcommittee on Highways and Transit
  - Subcommittee on Railroads, Pipelines, and Hazardous Materials

== Personal life and death ==
Mitchell moved to Saginaw County, Michigan, when he married his wife, Sherry Mitchell, in 2008. A longtime resident of Thomas Township, near Saginaw, he purchased a home in Dryden Township to run for the 10th district seat in Congress.

In June 2021, Mitchell announced he had been diagnosed with stage 4 renal cancer and underwent surgery to remove a mass and blood clot near his heart. He died on August 15, 2021, aged 64.

== Electoral history ==
2014 Michigan's 4th congressional district Republican primary
Party	Candidate	Votes	%
Republican	John Moolenaar	34,399	52.4
Republican	Paul Mitchell	23,844	36.3
Republican	Peter Konetchy	7,408	11.3
Majority		10,555	16.1

2016 Michigan's 10th congressional district Republican primary
Party	Candidate	Votes	%
Republican	Paul Mitchell	30,114	38.0
Republican	Phillip Pavlov	22,018	27.8
Republican	Alan Sanborn	12,640	15.9
Republican	Tony Forlini	7,888	9.9
Republican	David VanAssche	6,690	8.4
Majority		8,096	10.2

2016 Michigan's 10th congressional district election
Party	Candidate	Votes	%	±%
Republican	Paul Mitchell	215,132	63.1	−5.6
Democratic	Frank Accavitti Jr.	110,112	32.3	+2.9
Libertarian	Lisa Lane Gioia	10,612	3.1	+3.1
Green	Benjamin Nofs	5,127	1.5	−0.5
Majority		105,120	30.8	−8.5
Turnout		340,983		+49.1
Republican hold				

2018 Michigan's 10th congressional district election
Party	Candidate	Votes	%	±%
Republican	Paul Mitchell (incumbent)	182,808	60.3	−2.8
Democratic	Kimberly Bizon	106,061	35.0	+2.7
Independent	Jeremy Peruski	11,344	3.7	+3.7
Green	Harley Mikkelson	2,851	0.9	−0.6
Majority		76,747	25.3	−5.5
Turnout		303,064		−11.1
Republican hold				

== See also ==
- List of United States representatives who switched parties

U.S. House of Representatives
Preceded by Candice Miller	Member of the U.S. House of Representatives from Michigan's 10th congressional district 2017–2021	Succeeded by Lisa McClain
