= United States House Oversight Subcommittee on Health Care and Financial Services =

Subcommittee of Committee on Oversight and Government Reform
- Active United States House of Representatives; 119th Congress

Leadership
- Chair: Glenn Grothman (R)
- Ranking Member: Raja Krishnamoorthi (D)

Structure
- Seats: 10 (10 currently filled) 6/6 4/4
- Political parties: Majority (6): Republican (6); Minority (4): Democratic (4)

Meeting place
- 2157, Rayburn House Office Building; Washington, D.C. 20515

Phone number
- (202)-225-5074

The Subcommittee on Health Care and Financial Services is a subcommittee of the United States House Committee on Oversight and Accountability. It was revived for the 118th Congress by chairman James Comer after Republicans regained control of the House of Representatives.

== Jurisdiction ==
Until the 115th Congress, the subcommittee was known as the Subcommittee on Health Care, Benefits and Administrative Rules. Its jurisdiction included the Census Bureau, the National Archives and Records Administration, health care, and the District of Columbia. It was previously known as the Subcommittee on Information Policy, Census, and National Archives. During the 112th Congress, the Oversight and Government Reform Committee went through a reorganization under chairman Darrell Issa. As a result, jurisdiction over several matters were shifted between various subcommittees. For example, Information Policy, which as formally under the jurisdiction of the subcommittee, was transferred a new Subcommittee on Technology, Information Policy, Intergovernmental Relations and Procurement Reform. Jurisdiction over matters involving the District of Columbia were transferred to the subcommittee from the former United States House Oversight Subcommittee on Federal Workforce, Post Office, and the District of Columbia.

== Members, 119th Congress ==
| Majority | Minority |
|---|---|
| Glenn Grothman, Wisconsin, Chair; Paul Gosar, Arizona; Pete Sessions, Texas; Anna Paulina Luna, Florida; John McGuire, Virginia; Brandon Gill, Texas | Raja Krishnamoorthi, Illinois, Ranking Member; Emily Randall, Washington; Wesley Bell, Missouri; Lateefah Simon, California |
Ex officio
| James Comer, Kentucky | Gerry Connolly, Virginia (until April 28, 2025); Stephen Lynch, Massachusetts (April 28–June 24, 2025); Robert Garcia, California (from June 24, 2025) |

== Historical membership rosters ==
=== 115th Congress ===
| Majority | Minority |
|---|---|
| Lisa McClain, Michigan, Chair; Mark Walker, North Carolina; Darrell Issa, California; Mark Sanford, South Carolina; Scott DesJarlais, Tennessee; Mark Meadows, North Carolina; Glenn Grothman, Wisconsin; Paul Mitchell, Michigan | Raja Krishnamoorthi, Illinois, Ranking Member; Jim Cooper, Tennessee; Eleanor Holmes Norton, District of Columbia; Robin Kelly, Illinois; Bonnie Watson Coleman, New Jersey; Stacey Plaskett, U.S. Virgin Islands |
Ex officio
| Trey Gowdy, South Carolina | Elijah Cummings, Maryland |
