= United States House Oversight Subcommittee on Cybersecurity, Information Technology, and Government Innovation =

Subcommittee of Committee on Oversight and Government Reform
- Active United States House of Representatives; 119th Congress

Leadership
- Chair: Nancy Mace (R)
- Ranking Member: Shontel Brown (D)

Structure
- Seats: 10 (10 currently filled) 6/6 4/4
- Political parties: Majority (6): Republican (6); Minority (4): Democratic (4)

Meeting place
- 2157, Rayburn House Office Building; Washington, D.C. 20515

Phone number
- (202)-225-5074

The Subcommittee on Cybersecurity, Information Technology and Government Innovation is a subcommittee within the U.S. House Oversight Committee. Previously known as the Subcommittee on Information Technology, its chair is Republican Nancy Mace.

== Jurisdiction ==
The subcommittee has oversight jurisdiction over the federal information technology (IT), data standards and quality, cybersecurity, IT infrastructure and acquisition, emerging technologies, privacy, cloud computing, data centers and intellectual property.

The subcommittee was merged with the Subcommittee on Government Operations in the 116th Congress. The merger was undone in the 118th Congress.

== Members, 119th Congress ==
Majority	Minority
Nancy Mace, South Carolina, Chair; Anna Paulina Luna, Florida; Eric Burlison, Missouri; Eli Crane, Arizona; John McGuire, Virginia; Rich McCormick, Georgia	Shontel Brown, Ohio, Ranking Member; Ro Khanna, California; Suhas Subramanyam, Virginia; Yassamin Ansari, Arizona
Ex officio
James Comer, Kentucky	Gerry Connolly, Virginia (until April 28, 2025); Stephen Lynch, Massachusetts (April 28–June 24, 2025); Robert Garcia, California (from June 24, 2025)

== Historical membership rosters ==
=== 118th Congress ===
Majority	Minority
Nancy Mace, South Carolina, Chair; William Timmons, South Carolina; Tim Burchett, Tennessee; Marjorie Taylor Greene, Georgia; Anna Paulina Luna, Florida; Chuck Edwards, North Carolina; Nick Langworthy, New York; Eric Burlison, Missouri	Gerry Connolly, Virginia, Ranking Member; Ro Khanna, California; Kweisi Mfume, Maryland; Jimmy Gomez, California; Jared Moskowitz, Florida
