= Katie Hill =

American politician (born 1987)

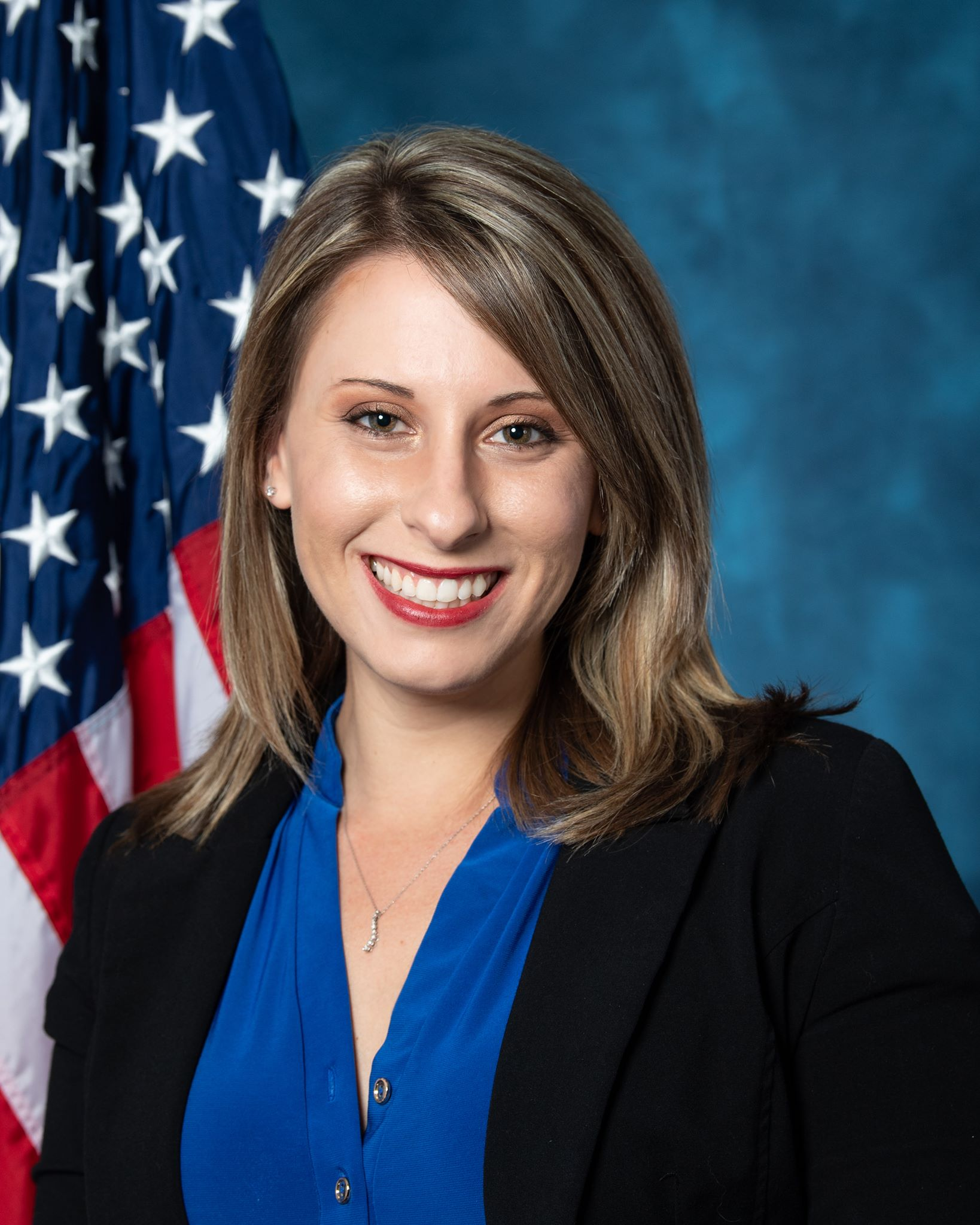
- Official portrait, 2019

Member of the U.S. House of Representatives from California's 25th district
- In office January 3, 2019 – November 3, 2019
- Preceded by: Steve Knight
- Succeeded by: Mike Garcia

Personal details
- Born: Katherine Lauren Hill; August 25, 1987 (age 39) Abilene, Texas, U.S.
- Party: Democratic
- Spouse(s): Kenny Heslep (m. 2010; div. 2019) Alex Thomas (m. 2024)
- Children: 1
- Education: College of the Canyons; California State University, Northridge (BA, MPA)
- Hill's voice Hill on Apollo 11's 50th anniversary. Recorded July 17, 2019

Katherine Lauren Hill (born August 25, 1987) is an American former politician and social services administrator from Agua Dulce, California. A member of the Democratic Party, she served as the U.S. representative for California's 25th congressional district from January to November 2019. Hill is the former executive director of People Assisting the Homeless (PATH), a statewide non-profit organization working to end homelessness throughout California. She won her seat by defeating incumbent Republican Steve Knight in the 2018 midterm elections.

On October 18, 2019, political blog RedState published a report on an alleged affair between Hill and her legislative director, which they both denied. Five days later on October 23, Hill admitted an inappropriate relationship with a campaign staffer before she became a member of Congress. On October 27, she announced her resignation from Congress. Nude photos of Hill were published by the Daily Mail, a British tabloid. Hill blamed the release of the photos on her ex-husband, called them an invasion of privacy and vowed to advocate for victims of revenge porn. She left office on November 3, 2019.

In June 2021, Hill was ordered to pay US$220,000 to the Daily Mail and other media, to reimburse the legal fees these companies spent defending themselves.

As of 2026, Hill was the CEO of Union Station Homeless Services.

== Early life and education ==
Hill was born in Abilene, Texas, and grew up in the Saugus section of Santa Clarita, California. Her mother, Rachel (née Campbell), was a registered nurse, and her father, Michael Hill, was a police lieutenant.

Hill attended public schools in the Santa Clarita Valley and graduated from Saugus High School in 2004. At California State University, Northridge, she earned a bachelor's degree in English and a Master of Public Administration.

== Earlier career ==
Hill began her career as a policy advocate at People Assisting the Homeless (PATH), a nonprofit organization developing affordable and supportive services for the homeless in California. Later, as the executive director of PATH, she raised the organization from a local force in Los Angeles County to one of the largest nonprofit providers of homes for the homeless in California. Hill helped pass a ballot initiative, Measure H, in the spring of 2017 to help alleviate homelessness by providing $1.2 billion in funds for homeless services in Los Angeles County. Hill and her husband also raised goats in Agua Dulce, California.

== U.S. House of Representatives ==
=== Elections ===
==== 2018 ====
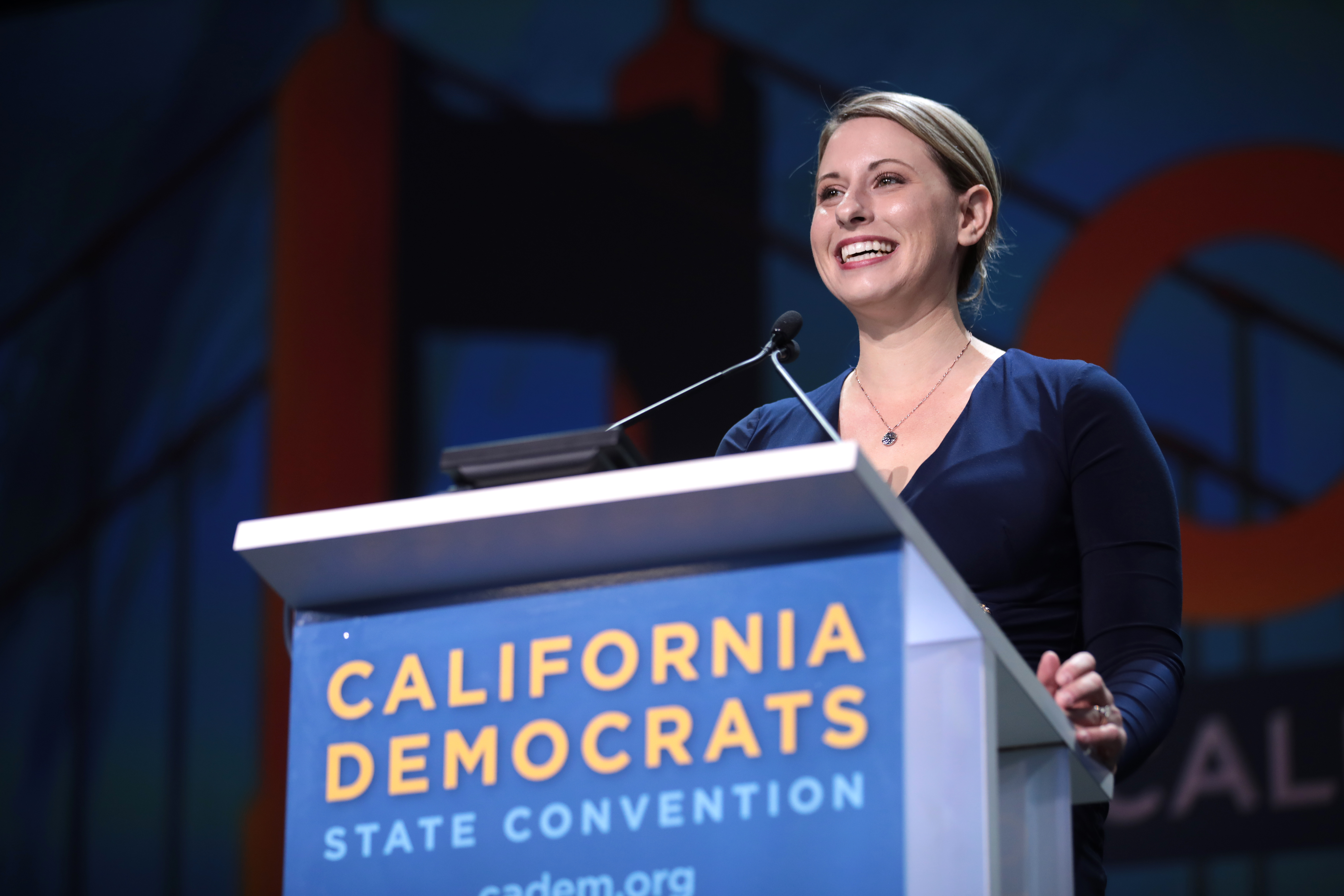
Hill speaking at the California Democratic Party State Convention (2019)

On March 8, 2017, Hill announced her candidacy for the U.S. House of Representatives for California's 25th congressional district, her home district, challenging incumbent Steve Knight, a Republican who had held the office since 2014. Knight won re-election in 2016.

In 2018, Hill came in second place in the primary election for California's 25th Congressional District, allowing her to advance to the November 6, 2018 general election, where she again faced Knight. In the general election, she defeated Knight by a 54% vs. 46% tally.

She was the subject of a documentary-style series of episodes that aired on the HBO show Vice News Tonight. The series documented the Hill campaign as the "most millennial campaign ever" for Congress. Vice News Tonight reportedly planned on doing a follow-up episode regarding Hill's advancement to the general election.

In the weeks leading up to the midterm election, Hill was endorsed by former President Barack Obama, who also attended a campaign event in Southern California leading up to the election.

=== Political positions ===
Hill stated during her race for office that her top issues were addressing healthcare, rebuilding the middle class with policies that address income inequality and affordable housing, and getting big money out of politics. She also stated her support for Medicare for All.

Hill reportedly ran a grassroots campaign that did not accept money from corporate political action committees. In the first quarter of 2018, she raised over $400,000, bringing her total to $1,092,025 raised, with more than 9,800 individual contributions and more than 5,100 individual donors.

Hill has supported comprehensive immigration reform, while working towards greater funding and security along the southern border to counter primarily illegal drug trafficking and other various crimes. She has also supported some form of physical barrier along certain areas of the southern border.

According to an October 2018 article in Rolling Stone, Hill is an unabashed gun owner:

"We have the highest number of law enforcement officials of any district in my county. And we have the second-highest number of veterans of any district in the country. On top of that, a quarter of our district is rural. So people do own guns. That's how my husband and I both grew up. Forty percent of our district owns a gun or lives in a household with a gun."

=== Tenure ===
Before the start of the 116th Congress, Hill and Colorado freshman U.S. Representative Joe Neguse were chosen as the freshman class representatives for the Democratic Caucus.

==== Committee assignments ====
- Committee on Armed Services
  - Subcommittee on Seapower and Projection Forces
  - Subcommittee on Tactical Air and Land Forces
- Committee on Oversight and Reform (Vice chair)
  - Subcommittee on Economic and Consumer Policy
  - United States House Oversight Subcommittee on Environment
- Committee on Science, Space, and Technology
  - Subcommittee on Space and Aeronautics

==== Caucus memberships ====
- Congressional LGBT Equality Caucus (co-chair)
- Congressional Progressive Caucus
- New Democrat Coalition

=== Accusations of improper relationships ===
Hill's final speech on her decision to resign (October 31, 2019)

On October 18, 2019, political blog RedState published allegations that Hill was involved in an extramarital affair with her young male staffer, which he denied. Hill also denied the allegations, saying that her estranged husband, whom she described as abusive, was doing everything he could to humiliate her, and that her political opponents were exploiting a private matter for political gain. Her husband denied the allegations of abuse, claiming that his computer was hacked. Hill reached out to the Speaker of the House of Representatives Nancy Pelosi to deny the allegations.

On October 23, 2019, Hill sent an email to constituents in which she admitted to an inappropriate relationship with a campaign staffer before becoming a member of Congress. The relationship was with a 22-year-old female subordinate. RedState also published nude photos of Hill as part of the story; the RedState author had a history of working for Republican campaigns, including Hill's opponent. Writing in The Atlantic, Quinta Jurecic wrote "this is the first instance of which I am aware when a politically aligned publication has published an explicit photo of an opposition politician for apparent political gain." Hill said that the U.S. Capitol Police opened an investigation into who might have leaked the photos.

==== Investigation ====
The House Ethics Committee announced on October 23, 2019, that it would conduct an investigation into the allegation that Hill had had an affair with her staffer, which would be in violation of House ethics reforms implemented in 2018 in response to the #MeToo movement. Hill promised to cooperate with the congressional ethics investigation regarding allegations of wrongdoing as a member of Congress.

==== Resignation ====
On October 27, 2019, Hill announced via Twitter that she would resign from Congress: "This is the hardest thing I have ever had to do, but I believe it is the best thing for my constituents and our country." Speaker of the House Nancy Pelosi said Hill made "some errors in judgment that made her continued service as a Member untenable". Hill vowed to combat revenge porn after photos of her were leaked.

In her last speech before Congress on October 31, 2019, Hill said there was a "double standard" and "misogynistic culture" that resulted in her decision to step down from her position:

"I'm leaving, but we have men who have been credibly accused of intentional acts of sexual violence and remain in boardrooms, on the Supreme Court, in this very body, and worst of all, in the Oval Office...As my final act I voted to move forward with the impeachment of Donald Trump on behalf of the women of the United States of America."

== Later work ==
On December 7, 2019, Hill wrote an op-ed in The New York Times in which she describes the events that led to her decision to resign, and mentions that she was suicidal during that time period.

In the special election held in the spring of 2020, Hill endorsed state Assemblywoman Christy Smith, who ultimately lost the election in an upset. Hill, whose PAC, HER Time, contributed $200,000, said that Smith had been considered "the mom of Democratic politics" in the district for years, and that "there's no one else that I could even think of that I would want to run for this." Some Democrats regretted Hill's involvement in the campaign.

Hill released a memoir titled She Will Rise: Becoming a Warrior for True Equality in August 2020. Hill noted that, after her resignation, Monica Lewinsky reached out and offered to talk about some of the similarities and differences in their respective experiences being the victim of public shaming.

In December 2020, Hill filed a lawsuit against her ex-husband, the Daily Mail, and RedState over "nonconsensual porn". On April 7, 2021, a judge ruled in favor of the Daily Mail, finding that the photos are protected as "a matter of public issue or public interest" under the First Amendment to the United States Constitution. Hill's attorneys said they planned to appeal the decision. The judge also ordered Hill to pay roughly $220,000 in fees to the Daily Mail. In July 2022, Hill declared bankruptcy, which would allow her to avoid paying the defendants' attorney fees.

On April 5, 2021, Hill called for Matt Gaetz to resign in an opinion piece for Vanity Fair, after it was reported that Gaetz had allegedly shown pictures of naked women he claimed to have slept with, including to colleagues on the House floor. Gaetz had supported Hill after the leak of her photos, and Hill called him an "unlikely friend" during their time in Congress.

Hill's HER Time PAC was active during the 2022 midterms, but not during the 2024 elections.

The Washington Post published an op-ed by Hill in September 2023. In it, Hill discusses the apparent rise in individuals creating intimate content of themselves, as well as the lack of accountability of bad actors using this content as political leverage against the creators. She cites her own incident in Congress as an example.

In November 2024, Hill was appointed by County Supervisor Hilda Solis to the Los Angeles Homeless Services Authority. In December 2024, Hill became the CEO of Union Station Homeless Services. "Hill said she will recuse herself from decisions involving Union Station funding..." to avoid a conflict of interest.

== Electoral history ==
California's 25th congressional district election, 2018
Primary election
Party	Candidate	Votes	%
Republican	Steve Knight (incumbent)	61,411	51.8
Democratic	Katie Hill	24,507	20.7
Democratic	Bryan Caforio	21,821	18.4
Democratic	Jess Phoenix	7,549	6.4
Democratic	Mary Pallant	3,157	2.7
Total votes		118,445	100.0
General election
Democratic	Katie Hill	133,209	54.4
Republican	Steve Knight (incumbent)	111,813	45.6
Total votes		245,022	100.0
Democratic gain from Republican			

== Personal life ==
Hill came out as bisexual after high school. She was California's first openly bisexual person to be elected to Congress.

Hill had a tattoo of an Iron Cross on her lower groin, which she got after a sexual assault as a teenager. She had the tattoo covered over after photos were published in 2019. Hill is an advocate for victims of child sexual abuse, having herself been abused at age 8, age 15, and twice at age 16. She discussed having suicidal ideation as a result, which she shared in the aftermath of her resignation from Congress.

In July 2010, Hill married Kenny Heslep, whom she began dating just after high school. They resided in Agua Dulce, California, on their farm, where they fostered rescue animals. Heslep filed for divorce in 2019, and the divorce was settled in October 2020. In December 2020, a judge awarded Hill a restraining order against her ex-husband.

Hill also rented an apartment in Washington, D.C., with freshman representative Lauren Underwood.

On January 19, 2020, her half-brother, Daniel Bennett, died of a drug overdose at the age of 20.

Hill's memoir, She Will Rise: Becoming a Warrior in the Battle for True Equality, in which she shares her experiences from her time in politics, was published in 2020.

== See also ==
- List of federal political sex scandals in the United States
- List of LGBT members of the United States Congress
- Women in the United States House of Representatives

U.S. House of Representatives
Preceded by Steve Knight	Member of the U.S. House of Representatives from California's 25th congressional district 2019	Succeeded by Mike Garcia
U.S. order of precedence (ceremonial)
Preceded by Erica Lee Carter as Former U.S. Representative	Order of precedence of the United States as Former U.S. Representative	Succeeded by Connie Conway as Former U.S. Representative
