= United States House Oversight Subcommittee on Civil Rights and Civil Liberties =

The Subcommittee on Civil Rights and Civil Liberties was a subcommittee within the United States House Committee on Oversight and Government Reform. It was dissolved for the 118th Congress after Republicans took control of the House of Representatives and James Comer became the full committee chairman.

== Jurisdiction ==
The subcommittee had oversight jurisdiction over: issues related to civil rights, civil liberties and the equal protection of laws, including voting rights, freedom of religion, speech, press, and assembly; equal employment; nondisclosure agreements; and criminal justice reform policies; and legislative and oversight jurisdiction over the Census Bureau and the Census.

== Members, 117th Congress ==
Majority	Minority
Jamie Raskin, Maryland, Chair; Alexandria Ocasio-Cortez, New York, Vice Chair; Kweisi Mfume, Maryland; Debbie Wasserman Schultz, Florida; Robin Kelly, Illinois; Ayanna Pressley, Massachusetts; Eleanor Holmes Norton, District of Columbia; Rashida Tlaib, Michigan; Danny K. Davis, Illinois	Pete Sessions, Texas, Ranking Member; Jim Jordan, Ohio; Andy Biggs, Arizona; Nancy Mace, South Carolina; Scott Franklin, Florida; Byron Donalds, Florida
Ex officio
Carolyn Maloney, New York	James Comer, Kentucky

== Historical subcommittee rosters ==
=== 116th Congress ===
Majority	Minority
Jamie Raskin, Maryland, Chair; Lacy Clay, Missouri; Debbie Wasserman Schultz, Florida; Robin Kelly, Illinois; Jimmy Gomez, California; Alexandria Ocasio-Cortez, New York; Ayanna Pressley, Massachusetts; Eleanor Holmes Norton, District of Columbia; Debra Haaland, New Mexico (since November 20, 2019)	Chip Roy, Texas, Ranking Member; Thomas Massie, Kentucky; Jody Hice, Georgia; Michael Cloud, Texas; Carol Miller, West Virginia; Fred Keller, Pennsylvania (since March 30, 2020)
Ex officio
Carolyn Maloney, New York	Jim Jordan, Ohio
