= United States House Oversight Subcommittee on Delivering on Government Efficiency =

Subcommittee of Committee on Oversight and Government Reform
- Active United States House of Representatives; 119th Congress

Leadership
- Chair: Tim Burchett (R)
- Ranking Member: Melanie Stansbury (D)

Structure
- Seats: 18 (18 currently filled) 10/10 8/8
- Political parties: Majority (10): Republican (10); Minority (8): Democratic (8)

Meeting place
- 2157, Rayburn House Office Building; Washington, D.C. 20515

Phone number
- (202)-225-5074

The Subcommittee on Delivering on Government Efficiency is a subcommittee of the United States House Committee on Oversight and Government Reform. It was established for the 119th United States Congress. The name is meant to invoke connection with the Department of Government Efficiency, a temporary organization headed by Elon Musk.

== Jurisdiction ==
The subcommittee has oversight jurisdiction over the federal civil service, including compensation, classification, and benefits; federal property disposal; government reorganizations and operations, including transparency, performance, grants management, and accounting measures generally.

== Members, 119th Congress ==
| Majority | Minority |
|---|---|
| Tim Burchett, Tennessee, Chair; Michael Cloud, Texas; Pat Fallon, Texas; William Timmons, South Carolina; Tim Burchett, Tennessee; Eric Burlison, Missouri; Brian Jack, Georgia; Brandon Gill, Texas | Melanie Stansbury, New Mexico, Ranking Member; Eleanor Holmes Norton, District of Columbia; Stephen Lynch, Massachusetts; Robert Garcia, California; Greg Casar, Texas; Jasmine Crockett, Texas |
Ex officio
| James Comer, Kentucky | Gerry Connolly, Virginia (until April 28, 2025); Stephen Lynch, Massachusetts (April 28–June 24, 2025) |
