= United States House Oversight Subcommittee on Federal Law Enforcement =

Subcommittee of Committee on Oversight and Government Reform
- Active United States House of Representatives; 119th Congress

Leadership
- Chair: Clay Higgins (R)
- Ranking Member: Greg Casar (D)

Structure
- Seats: 12 (12 currently filled) 7/7 5/5
- Political parties: Majority (7): Republican (7); Minority (5): Democratic (5)

Meeting place
- 2157, Rayburn House Office Building; Washington, D.C. 20515

Phone number
- (202)-225-5074

The Subcommittee on Federal Law Enforcement is a subcommittee of the United States House Committee on Oversight and Government Reform. It was established for the 119th United States Congress.

== Jurisdiction ==
[The Subcommittee] shall have oversight jurisdiction over homeland security, and criminal justice, and federal law and regulatory enforcement, and the U.S. borders and immigration (shared with the Subcommittee on Military and Foreign Affairs).

== Members, 119th Congress ==
Majority	Minority
Clay Higgins, Louisiana, Chair; Paul Gosar, Arizona; Andy Biggs, Arizona; Nancy Mace, South Carolina; Scott Perry, Pennsylvania; Lauren Boebert, Colorado; Brian Jack, Georgia	Summer Lee, Pennsylvania, Ranking Member; Wesley Bell, Missouri; Lateefah Simon, California
Ex officio
James Comer, Kentucky	Gerry Connolly, Virginia (until April 28, 2025); Stephen Lynch, Massachusetts (April 28–June 24, 2025); Robert Garcia, California (from June 24, 2025)
