= United States House Oversight Subcommittee on Environment =

The Subcommittee on Environment was a subcommittee within the U.S. House of Representatives Oversight and Accountability Committee. It was dissolved for the 118th Congress after Republicans took control of the House of Representatives and James Comer became the full committee chairman.

== Jurisdiction ==
The Subcommittee had oversight jurisdiction over: global climate change; environmental protection, public lands, endangered species, air and water quality; oceans; public health; conservation; international agreements; energy policy, research and development; and oversight and legislative jurisdiction over regulatory affairs and federal paperwork reduction.

== Members, 117th Congress ==
Majority	Minority
Ro Khanna, California, Chair; Jim Cooper, Tennessee; Alexandria Ocasio-Cortez, New York; Rashida Tlaib, Michigan, Vice Chair; Jimmy Gomez, California; Raja Krishnamoorthi, Illinois; Cori Bush, Missouri	Ralph Norman, South Carolina, Ranking Member; Paul Gosar, Arizona; Bob Gibbs, Ohio; Pat Fallon, Texas; Yvette Herrell, New Mexico
Ex officio
Carolyn Maloney, New York	James Comer, Kentucky

== Historical membership rosters ==
=== 115th Congress ===
Majority	Minority
Blake Farenthold, Texas, Chairman (until April 6, 2018); Greg Gianforte, Montana, Chairman (since April 6, 2018); Paul Gosar, Arizona; Dennis A. Ross, Florida; Gary Palmer, Alabama; James Comer, Kentucky; Michael Cloud, Texas (since April 6, 2018)	Stacey Plaskett, U.S. Virgin Islands, Ranking Member; Jamie Raskin, Maryland; Jimmy Gomez, California (since July 11, 2017)
Ex officio
Trey Gowdy, South Carolina	Elijah Cummings, Maryland

=== 116th Congress ===
Majority	Minority
Harley Rouda, California, Chair; Katie Hill, California (until October 27, 2019); Rashida Tlaib, Michigan; Raja Krishnamoorthi, Illinois; Jimmy Gomez, California; Jackie Speier, California; Alexandria Ocasio-Cortez, New York	James Comer, Kentucky, Ranking Member; Paul Gosar, Arizona; Bob Gibbs, Ohio; Clay Higgins, Louisiana; Kelly Armstrong, North Dakota
Ex officio
Elijah Cummings, Maryland (until October 17, 2019); Carolyn Maloney, New York (since October 17, 2019)	Jim Jordan, Ohio
