= Lateefah Simon =

American politician (born 1977)

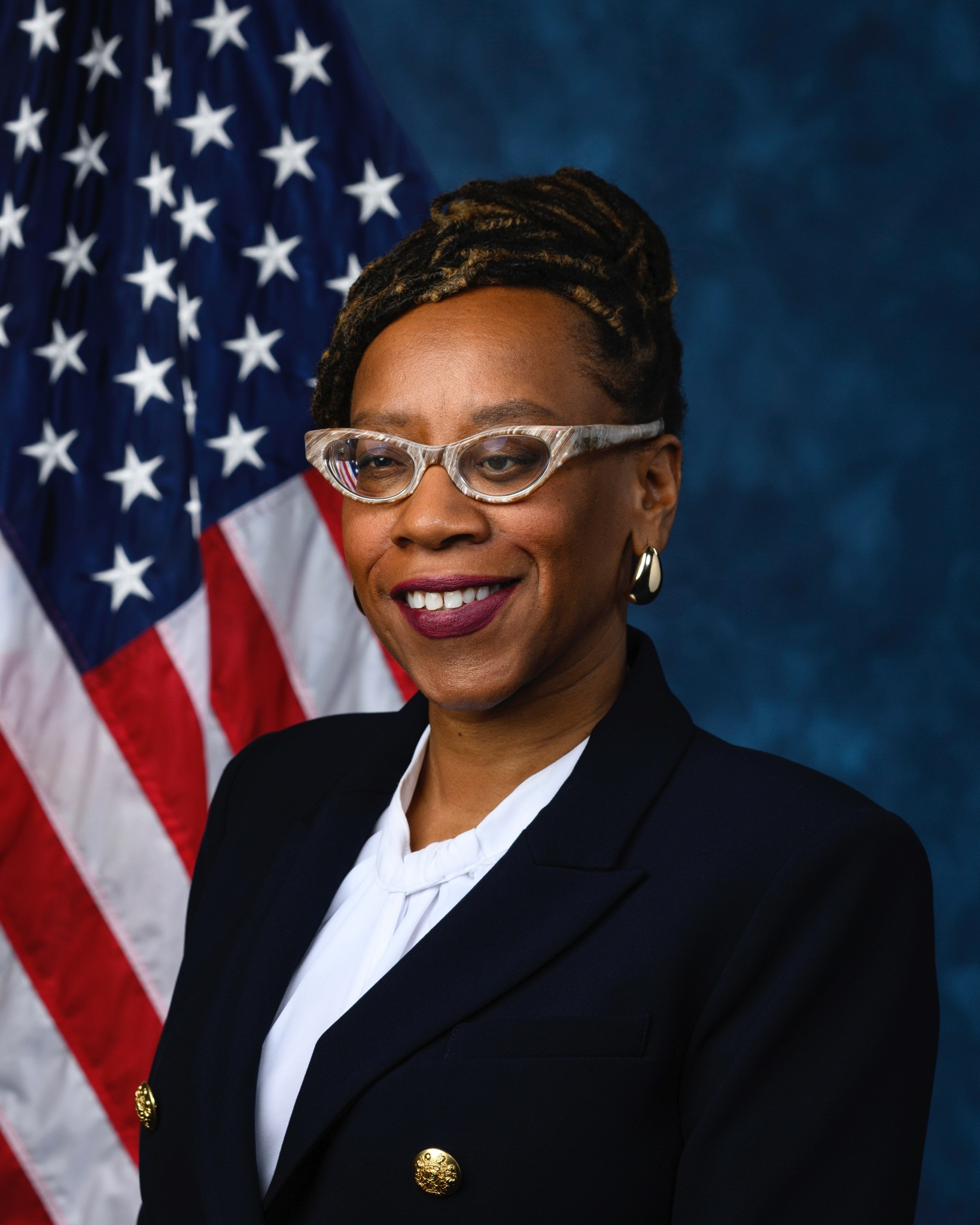
- Official portrait, 2025

Member of the U.S. House of Representatives from California's 12th district
- Incumbent
- Assumed office January 3, 2025
- Preceded by: Barbara Lee

Personal details
- Born: Lateefah Aaliyah Simon; January 29, 1977 (age 49) San Francisco, California, U.S.
- Party: Democratic
- Other political affiliations: Working Families
- Spouse: Kevin Weston (m. 2012; died 2014)
- Children: 2
- Education: Mills College (BA); University of San Francisco (MPA)
- Website: House website Campaign website

Lateefah Aaliyah Simon (born January 29, 1977) is an American politician who is the U.S. representative for California's 12th congressional district since January 2025. A member of the Democratic Party, she is the first member of Congress known to be born legally blind in both eyes, and the first Muslim member from California and outside of the Midwestern United States.

She served on the Bay Area Rapid Transit board of directors and on the board of trustees of the California State University system. She served as a trustee of the San Francisco Foundation and president of MeadowFund, a community investment fund created by Patricia Quillin, the wife of Netflix co-founder Reed Hastings, and was president of Akonadi Foundation, an organization focused on racial justice in Oakland, California. In 2003, she became the youngest woman to receive a MacArthur Fellowship for her leadership of the Center for Young Women's Development (now the Young Women's Freedom Center) in San Francisco at the age of 26.

== Early life and education ==
Simon was born and raised in the Western Addition neighborhood of San Francisco. She attended Washington High School, where she joined the debate team. Beginning at age 15, she did outreach work for the Young Women's Freedom Center.

Simon earned a Bachelor of Arts in public policy at Mills College, a Master of Public Administration from the University of San Francisco, and was a 2014 Social Entrepreneurs-in-Residence Fellow at Stanford University.

== Political career ==
During the tenure of Kamala Harris as San Francisco District Attorney, Simon led the creation of the city's Back on Track program for young adults charged with low-level felony drug sales. Simon also previously worked as the executive director of the Lawyers' Committee for Civil Rights of the San Francisco Bay Area.

In 2016, Simon was appointed to the California State University (CSU) Board of Trustees by Governor Jerry Brown.

Simon was elected to represent the seventh district on the Bay Area Rapid Transit District (BART) board of directors in 2016. Her motivations for running included her reliance on BART, as someone who is legally blind and unable to drive. In 2020, she was elected president of the board of directors.

In 2022, BART officials announced that Simon had been removed from the board after it was determined that her residence lay outside District 7, making her ineligible to represent the district. Simon stated that she had moved due to threats against her family stemming from her advocacy on police reform, and that she had been assured by BART staff prior to moving that the new residence was within district boundaries. She described the outcome as "deeply disappointing."

Later that month, BART reversed its decision and reinstated Simon to the board.

== Elections ==
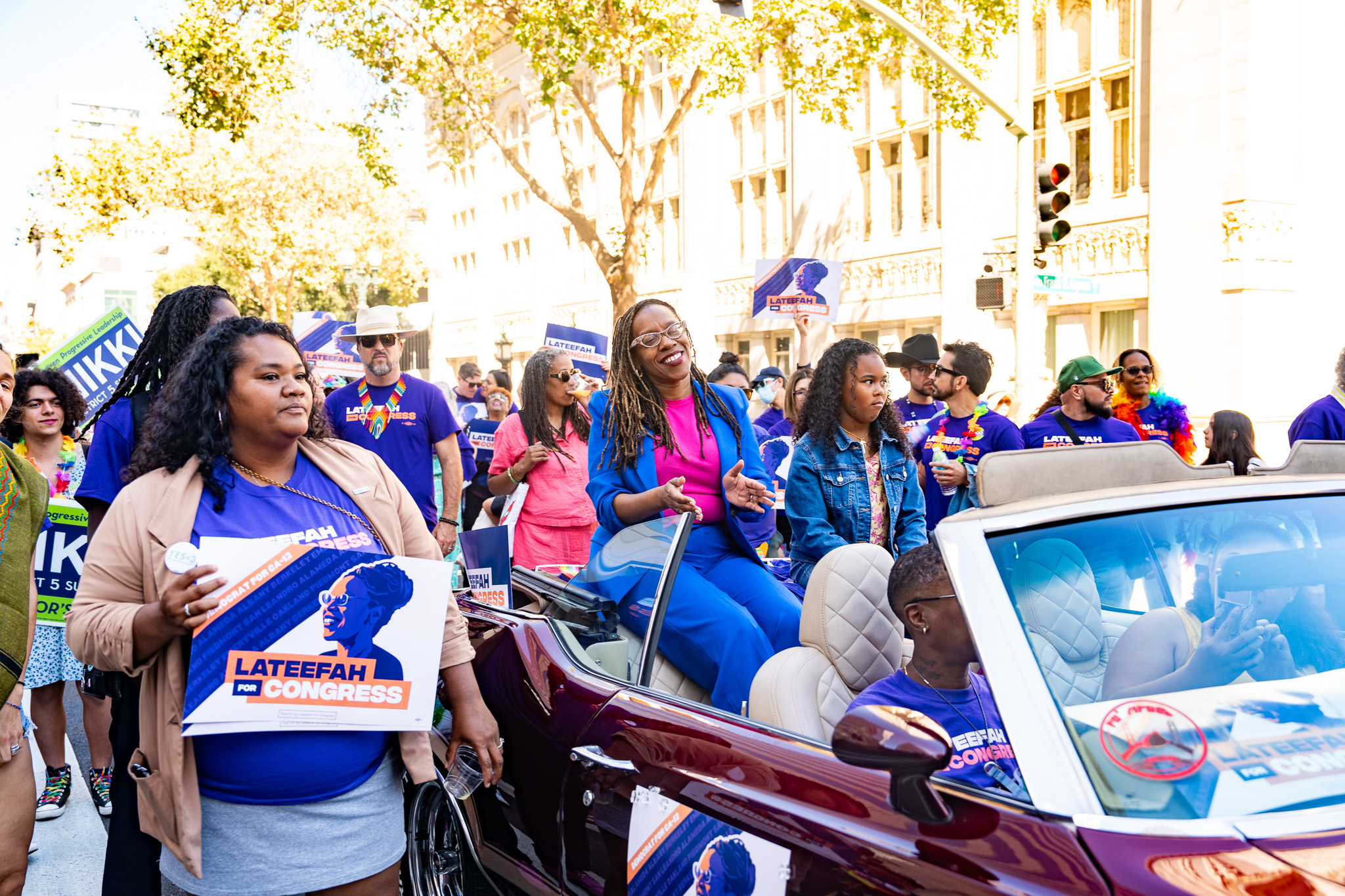
Lateefah Simon at the Oakland Pride Parade during her campaign for Congress

=== U.S. House of Representatives ===
==== 2024 election ====
In February 2023, Simon announced that she was running for California's 12th congressional district in the 2024 election. The previous representative for the district, Barbara Lee, did not seek re-election to the seat and instead ran as a candidate in the 2024 United States Senate election in California. On November 2, 2023, California Governor Gavin Newsom endorsed Simon's candidacy. Simon defeated CSU East Bay professor Jennifer Tran, a fellow Democrat, in the November general election.

==== Tenure ====
When Simon took office in January 2025, she was appointed deputy whip for policy, a role the San Francisco Chronicle described as unusually senior for a member of the House in their first term. Athough she is associated with the progressive wing of the Democratic Party, Simon stated that she would work across ideological lines when doing so could advance legislation. In February 2025, the House passed Simon's first bill, the bipartisan "Assisting Small Businesses Not Fraudsters Act", which was introduced together with Republican representative Roger Williams. The legislation would prohibit people convicted of defrauding the Small Business Administration from subsequently receiving assistance from the agency. In January 2026, while serving on the House Oversight Committee, Simon joined Republicans and eight other Democrats in recommending that former president Bill Clinton be held in contempt of Congress for declining to comply with a subpoena concerning the committee's investigation of Jeffrey Epstein. Simon said that her vote reflected the principle that no person was above the law and the requests of survivors for accountability. She opposed a separate contempt recommendation against Hillary Clinton, which she characterized as politically motivated.

==== Committee assignments ====
For the 119th Congress:

- Committee on Oversight and Government Reform
  - Subcommittee on Health Care and Financial Services
  - Subcommittee on Federal Law Enforcement
- Committee on Small Business
  - Subcommittee on Innovation, Entrepreneurship, and Workforce Development
  - Subcommittee on Oversight, Investigations, and Regulations

==== Caucus memberships ====
- Congressional Asian Pacific American Caucus
- Congressional Black Caucus
- Congressional Progressive Caucus (Vice Chair)
- Congressional Equality Caucus (Vice Chair)

== Political positions ==
Simon has positioned herself within the progressive wing of the Democratic Party, supporting policies modeled on European social democracies.

=== Economic policy ===
She has advocated in 2025 for a federal jobs guarantee, a national minimum wage of at least $15 per hour, universal health care, expanded union protections, and strengthened safety-net programs such as Medicaid and food assistance. In 2026, she co-introduced the "Living Wage for All Act'", which would gradually raise the federal minimum wage to $25 per hour and eliminate sub-minimum wages for tipped workers, younger workers and workers with disabilities.

She has opposed budgetary cuts to education, health care and social services while criticizing defense appropriations, pledging to vote against legislation that funds warfare. She has framed tariff policy as a form of “economic sabotage” that burdens households while failing to address structural inequalities.

In Congress, Simon has been critical of U.S. military intervention and funding of foreign conflicts. She has called for reductions in defense spending and a reorientation of federal resources toward domestic welfare, health care, and education.

=== Environment ===
Simon has opposed the proposed coal export terminal in West Oakland, saying the project would harm a community already affected by industrial pollution. In the following month, she joined other members of California's congressional delegation in asking the Government Accountability Office to investigate the administration's use of emergency national-defense powers and federal funds to support the terminal and other commercial coal infrastructure.

=== Housing and public transportation ===
In 2026, Simon and Representative Sara Jacobs introduced the "Connecting Communities Through Transit Planning Act". This bill aims to make a federal program permanent and expand support for housing near current and future public transit corridors.

Simon also introduced the "RIDER Safety Act". This legislation would allow federal transit grants to pay for transit-support specialists trained in crisis intervention, de-escalation, and customer assistance.

=== Foreign policy ===
==== Military intervention ====
Following the June 2025 U.S. strikes on Iranian nuclear facilities, Simon criticized President Donald Trump for ordering military action without congressional authorization. She described the strikes as "lawless, dangerous, and immoral" and argued that unilateral presidential military action endangered American troops and civilians.

==== Israel–Palestine ====
Simon has been outspoken in her criticism of Israeli military operations in Gaza and U.S. financial and military support for them. She described Israeli actions against Palestinians seeking humanitarian aid as "devastating, deplorable, and unacceptable," and stated that the United States has been complicit in civilian deaths. She has characterized the situation in Gaza as a humanitarian crisis marked by famine and civilian suffering, urging an end to U.S.-backed violence and restrictions on aid delivery.

=== LGBTQ rights ===
Simon is a straight ally to the LGBTQ community, and serves as vice chair of the Congressional Equality Caucus. She has worked with Democratic colleagues to defeat anti-trans legislation. She co-sponsored a resolution for a "Rise Up for LGBTQI+ Youth in Schools Initiative" with representative Mark Takano and senator Brian Schatz. In May 2025, she co-signed a letter urging health and human services secretary Robert F. Kennedy Jr. to preserve LGBTQ-specific services for youth calling the 988 Suicide and Crisis Lifeline.

== Personal life ==
Simon is the mother of two children. Simon's husband, Kevin Weston, was a journalist and activist who died from leukemia in 2014. She is Muslim and legally blind. Simon was inducted as an honorary member of Zeta Phi Beta during the organization's International Grand Boule in Nashville, Tennessee on July 11, 2026.

== Awards ==
- 2003 MacArthur Fellows Program
- 2007 Jefferson Award

== Electoral history ==
Electoral history of Lateefah Simon
Year	Office		Party	Primary			General			Result	Swing	Ref.
Year	Office		Party	Total	%	P.	Total	%	P.	Result	Swing	Ref.
2016	BART	7th	Nonpartisan				9,429	48.56	1st	Won	N/A	
2024	U.S. House	12th	Democratic	86,031	55.85	1st	185,176	65.43	1st	Won	Hold	
2026	U.S. House	12th	Democratic	153,190	84.24	1st	TBD					
Source: Secretary of State of California | Statewide Election Results

U.S. House of Representatives
Preceded by Barbara Lee	Member of the U.S. House of Representatives from California's 12th congressional district 2025–present	Incumbent
U.S. order of precedence (ceremonial)
Preceded by Jefferson Shreve	United States representatives by seniority 417th	Succeeded by Suhas Subramanyam
