= United States House Appropriations Select Intelligence Oversight Panel =

The United States House Appropriations Select Intelligence Oversight Panel was a select subcommittee of the House Committee on Appropriations. Established on January 9, 2007 pursuant to H.Res. 35, as part of efforts to implement the recommendations of the 9/11 Commission, it was eliminated in the rules adopted by the 112th Congress.

== History ==
The 9/11 Commission in the 9/11 Commission Report recommended a reorganization of the U.S. intelligence community, including its budget and appropriations, which are Classified information. Currently, the House Committee on Appropriations and its Defense Appropriations Subcommittee have jurisdiction over intelligence funding, and the House Permanent Select Committee on Intelligence has jurisdiction over authorization of that funding. The 9/11 Commission urged the creation of smaller committees responsible for both authorization and appropriation of intelligence funding, thereby limiting the number of lawmakers involved in the process and improving oversight. So far, the House Appropriations Committee has been reluctant to give up its long-standing prerogatives related to the appropriations process to separate committee. The Defense Subcommittee already has jurisdiction over military intelligence spending, and is reluctant to give up jurisdiction over the entire intelligence budget.

This is further complicated by the classified nature of intelligence funding. Currently, appropriations are authorized through a classified appendix or annex to the annual defense appropriations bill and the specific numbers are not released. The 9/11 Commission urged the public release of the overall funding amounts, while keeping specific agency funding secret. The current administration opposes the release of this information, citing concerns that the release of such information, even on a broad basis, could benefit America’s enemies. However, specific funding for military intelligence budget is already public released, so the commission saw no reason to continue keeping the remainder of the intelligence budget secret. Also, many in Congress are concerns that creating a stand-alone committee responsible for the appropriations while keeping them classified would further complicate the open, public operations of Congress.

== Jurisdiction ==
As a compromise, the House developed the select panel as a “hybrid” committee made up of Appropriations committee and intelligence committee members. H.Res. 35 stipulated that the 13-member panel shall include 10 House Appropriations Committee members, including the Chairmen and Ranking Members of the full committee and the Defense Appropriations Subcommittee. Three members are to come from the Permanent Select Committee on Intelligence. Intelligence committee members who serve on the panel are not members of the full appropriations committee, but are considered as such purposes of the select panel’s activities. The Speaker of the House makes all appointments to the select panel and selects its Chairman and Ranking Member.

The select panel has the same powers as any other Congressional committee or subcommittee of the House. It is able to conduct hearings, receive testimony, or any other duties normally conducted by a committee, except it lacks the ability to issue subpoenas or otherwise require the attendance and testimony of witnesses. Its primary purpose will be to review and study budget requests for intelligence activities, and make recommendations to the committee on appropriations and its subcommittees as appropriate. It will also prepare a report for the Defense Subcommittee containing recommendations on funding, which the Defense Subcommittee would use in developing the classified portion of the Defense appropriations bill.

== Past members, 111th Congress ==
Majority	Minority
Rush Holt, Chairman, New Jersey*; Dave Obey, Wisconsin; Norm Dicks, Washington; Silvestre Reyes, Texas*; Nita Lowey, New York; Adam Schiff, California; Steve Israel, New York; Debbie Wasserman Schultz, Florida	Ken Calvert, Ranking Member, California; Jerry Lewis, California; Bill Young, Florida; Pete Hoekstra, Michigan*; Rodney Frelinghuysen, New Jersey

*Denotes members of the select panel appointed from the House Intelligence Committee. These members are not members of the full House Appropriations Committee

== Intelligence Appropriations in the Senate ==
The U.S. Senate has no comparable subcommittee or panel on intelligence appropriations. S.Res. 445 of the 108th Congress called for the creation of a “Senate Appropriations Subcommittee on Intelligence,” but those efforts stalled citing many of the same concerns over competing jurisdictions between the Senate Select Committee on Intelligence and the Senate Appropriations Committee, and the classified nature of the intelligence budget. The Senate is currently considering S. 372, the Fiscal Year 2007 Intelligence Authorization Act, which would permit the public release of overall budget amounts for the intelligence funding, but is silent on the creation of a stand-alone intelligence appropriations subcommittee.
