= Brandon Gill =

American politician (born 1994)

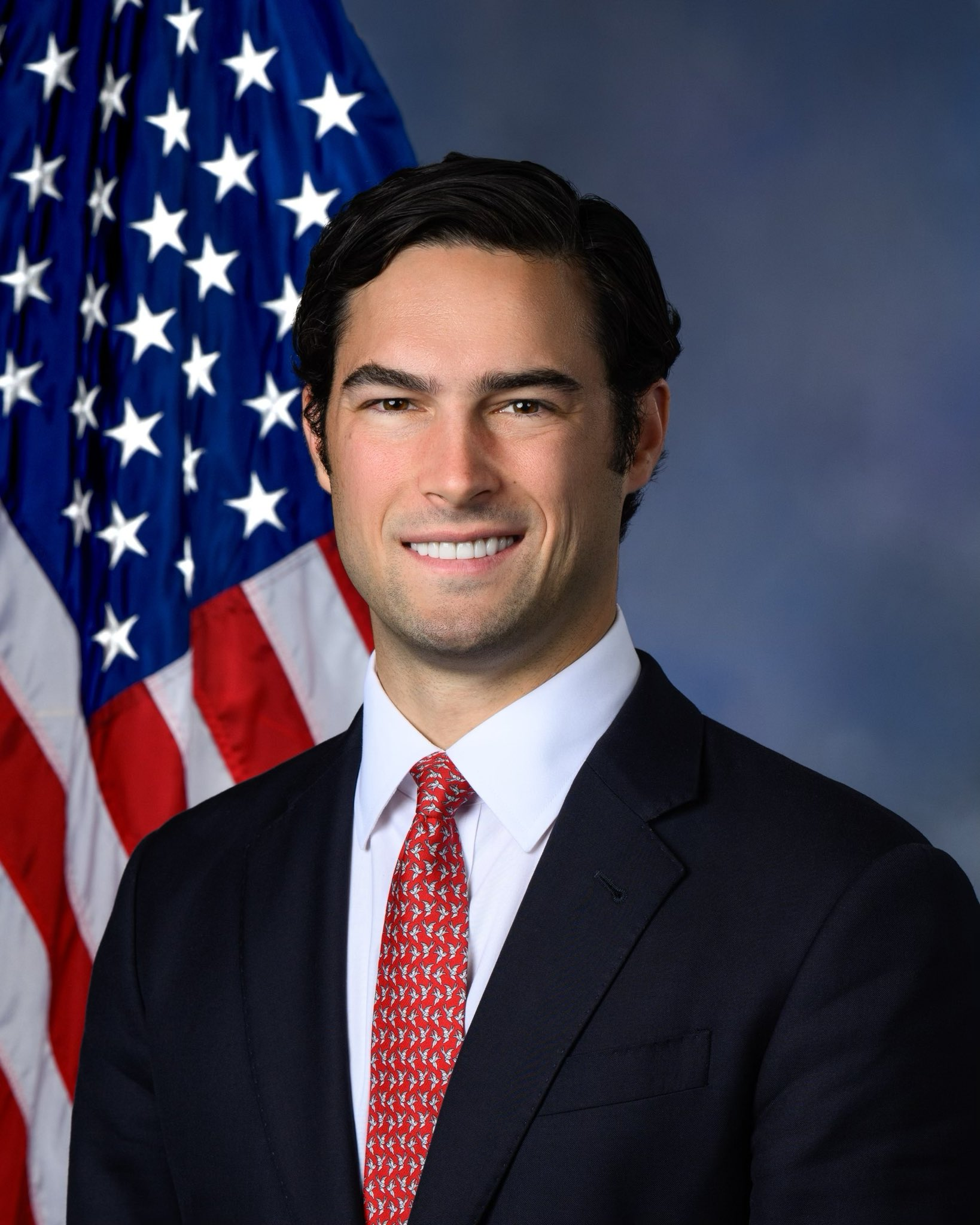
- Official portrait, 2024

Member of the U.S. House of Representatives from Texas's 26th district
- Incumbent
- Assumed office January 3, 2025
- Preceded by: Michael C. Burgess

Personal details
- Born: Brandon Gene Gill; February 26, 1994 (age 32) Clovis, New Mexico, U.S.
- Party: Republican
- Spouse: Danielle D'Souza (m. 2017)
- Children: 2
- Relatives: Dinesh D'Souza (father-in-law)
- Education: Dartmouth College (BA)
- Website: House website Campaign website
- Gill's voice Gill on Temporary Protected Status for Haitian immigrants Recorded April 16, 2026

Brandon Gene Gill (born February 26, 1994) is an American politician, media proprietor, and former investment banker serving as the U.S. representative for Texas's 26th congressional district since 2025. A member of the Republican Party, he is the youngest Republican member of Congress. His district is anchored in Denton County, a suburban county north of Dallas and Fort Worth.

Born in New Mexico and raised on a ranch in Texas, Gill graduated from Dartmouth College with a bachelor's degree in history and economics. After a brief career as an investment banker, Gill founded the online newspaper D.C. Enquirer in 2022. He worked as publisher and editor-in-chief of the paper until moving back to Texas to run for the U.S. House of Representatives.

Gill supports mass deportations and has described "fortifying the border" as his main policy objective. He has made a series of remarks critical of Islam that have been described by some as Islamophobic, including calling for Muslim immigration to be heavily restricted or prohibited.

== Early life and education ==
Gill was born on February 26, 1994, in Clovis, New Mexico, on a United States Air Force base where his father was stationed. Gill grew up in Eula, Texas. After high school, he attended Dartmouth College, where he headed the conservative student newspaper The Dartmouth Review. He graduated in 2016 with a Bachelor of Arts, cum laude, in history and economics.

== Career ==
After graduating, Gill worked in New York City as an investment banker at Nomura Securities.

Gill founded the online newspaper D.C. Enquirer in 2022, saying that he was "going to bat for President Trump in the public square." He marketed his father-in-law Dinesh D'Souza's 2022 film 2000 Mules, a political film that claimed that the 2020 United States presidential election was stolen.

== U.S. House of Representatives ==
=== Elections ===
==== 2024 U.S. House election ====
Gill announced he would seek the Republican nomination in Texas's 26th congressional district, seeking to succeed retiring incumbent Michael Burgess. Gill had moved to the district from New York City a year prior to Burgess announcing his retirement. Gill said that he would step back from his role as an editor for the D.C. Enquirer to run for office. He was endorsed by President Donald Trump and Senator Ted Cruz of Texas. Gill won the primary with over 50% of the vote (without needing a runoff despite having ten opponents), before winning the general election. Gill said that he hoped to join the House Freedom Caucus if elected into office. Gill defeated Democratic nominee Ernest Lineberger III and Libertarian candidate Phil Gray in the general election with over 60% of the vote.

=== Tenure ===
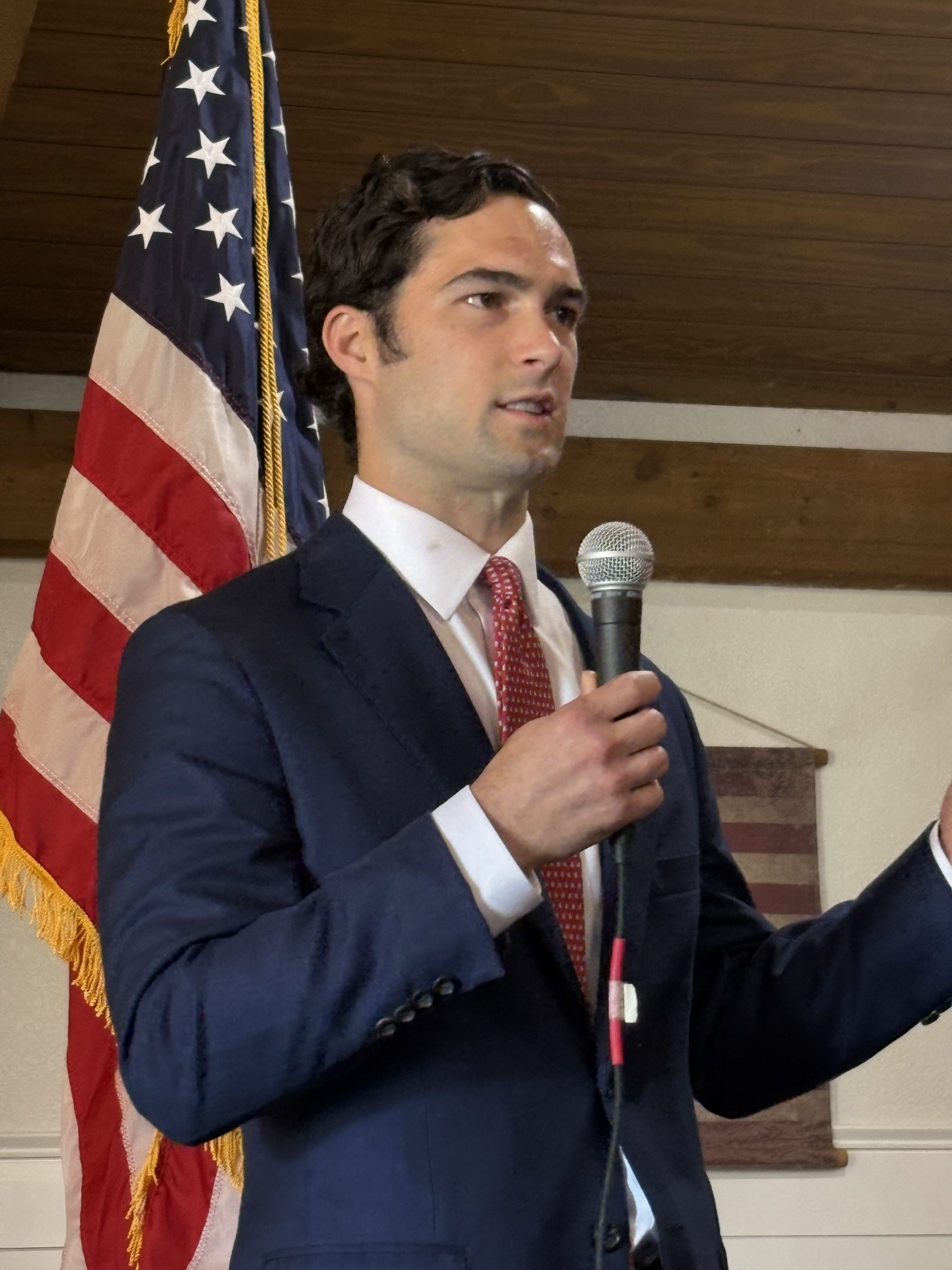
Gill at a town hall meeting in Wise County, Texas, in July 2025

Rep. Gill was sworn in to the 119th United States Congress on January 3, 2025. Gill is the youngest sitting House Republican. He is a member of the new House Department of Government Efficiency Committee.

Gill's first bill, the REMAIN in Mexico Act (H.R.273), would codify the Migrant Protection Protocols from Trump's first term, requiring asylum seekers entering from Mexico to wait there during immigration proceedings.

In March 2025, Gill submitted a bill to put Trump's face on the $100 note once his second term ends. In September 2025, Gill's DC Juvenile Sentencing Reform Act passed the House 225–203, lowering the age for trying certain juvenile offenders as adults in the District of Columbia. That same month, Gill introduced articles of impeachment against U.S. District Judge James E. Boasberg for blocking the Trump administration's use of the Alien Enemies Act to deport Venezuelan nationals; Chief Justice John Roberts issued a statement the same day calling impeachment "not an appropriate response to disagreement concerning a judicial decision." In November 2025, Gill filed a second impeachment resolution against Boasberg, alleging abuse of power for authorizing subpoenas of Republican senators' phone records during the Arctic Frost investigation.

=== Committee assignments ===
- Committee on the Judiciary
  - Subcommittee on the Constitution and Limited Government
  - Subcommittee on Immigration Integrity, Security, and Enforcement
  - Subcommittee on Oversight
- Committee on Oversight and Government Reform
  - Subcommittee on Government Operations
  - Subcommittee on Health Care and Financial Services
  - Subcommittee on Delivering on Government Efficiency

=== Caucus memberships ===
- Freedom Caucus

== Political positions ==
Gill stated that "fortifying the border" would be his principal policy objective. He supports mass deportations. Gill circulated a petition calling for the deportation of Somali-born Minnesota congresswoman Ilhan Omar after Omar gave an interview, advising undocumented people to "refrain from disclosing information" when being questioned by Immigration and Customs Enforcement. He has also described "remigration" policies as "desperately needed".

At an event hosted by the New York Young Republican Club, Gill praised Daniel Penny, who was acquitted of manslaughter for the killing of Jordan Neely. Gill said, "I think we need a lot more Daniel Pennys in this country, because we have far too many Jordan Neelys." According to MSNBC's Jared Holt, Gill celebrated Penny's acquittal on X by posting "It's still not illegal to be white."

Gill supports President Trump's proposal to redevelop the Gaza Strip, stating "President Trump is bringing peace to the Middle East, just as he promised. PROMISES KEPT."

=== Islam ===
Gill is an outspoken critic of Islam; some of his remarks have been characterized as Islamophobic. The Washington Post reported that Gill made comments "similar" to those by Rep. Randy Fine and Sen. Tommy Tuberville that the paper characterized as "blatant Islamophobia". In June 2025, Gill commented on a video of New York City mayoral candidate Zohran Mamdani eating with his hands, "Civilized people in America don't eat like this. If you refuse to adopt Western customs, go back to the Third World." Gill later criticized Mamdani for releasing a campaign video in Arabic, writing "Just a couple decades after 9/11, the leading candidate for NYC mayor is campaigning in Arabic. The humiliation is the point." In October 2025, Gill responded to journalist Mehdi Hasan on X, stating that Muslims were moving to the U.S. "en masse" to "fundamentally transform the landscape of American public life," and telling Hasan, "If you want to live in a Muslim country, go back to the UK." In a Newsmax interview, Gill said that "Islam is a political ideology that is incompatible with the United States. It's incompatible with our constitutional system and with Western civilization more broadly." Gill called for the restriction of Muslim immigration to the United States. In February 2026, Gill wrote on social media "How many Americans have to get 'Allahu Akbar'ed before we realize Islam is a problem?" Gill has claimed that Islam was incompatible with the United States in his newsletter, writing "How many times do we have to hear 'Allahu Akbar' in America before we recognize Islam is a problem?" Gill claimed that his constituents were "desperately concerned about the Islamization of the Dallas area." Gill said that "When you hear about constituents talking about going to their local malls and you look around and it feels like you're in Pakistan, not Dallas, Texas, that's a problem." In March 2026, Gill called for a total ban on Muslim immigration to the United States, writing "No more Muslims immigrating to America."

Gill is a member of the Sharia Free America Caucus. At a press conference hosted by the Caucus, Gill said “Islam is largely alien to American history, it certainly didn’t come to the United States on the Mayflower.”

== Electoral history ==
=== 2024 ===
Republican primary results
Party	Candidate	Votes	%
Republican	Brandon Gill	49,876	58.4
Republican	Scott Armey	12,400	14.5
Republican	John Huffman	8,559	10.0
Republican	Luisa del Rosal	3,949	4.6
Republican	Doug Robison	2,999	3.5
Republican	Mark Rutledge	2,130	2.5
Republican	Joel Krause	1,959	2.3
Republican	Neena Biswas	1,665	1.9
Republican	Burt Thakur	975	1.1
Republican	Vlad de Franceschi	572	0.7
Republican	Jason Kergosien	366	0.4
Total votes		85,450	100.0

Texas's 26th congressional district
Party	Candidate	Votes	%
Republican	Brandon Gill	241,096	62.1
Democratic	Ernest Lineberger	138,558	35.7
Libertarian	Phil Gray	8,773	2.3
Total votes		388,427	100

== Personal life ==
Gill married Danielle D'Souza, the daughter of conservative political commentator Dinesh D'Souza, in 2017. They have two children and live in Flower Mound, Texas.

U.S. House of Representatives
Preceded by Michael C. Burgess	Member of the U.S. House of Representatives from Texas's 26th congressional district 2025–present	Incumbent
U.S. order of precedence (ceremonial)
Preceded by Laura Friedman	United States representatives by seniority 381st	Succeeded by Laura Gillen
