= United States House Oversight Subcommittee on Transportation and Public Assets =

The Subcommittee on Transportation and Public Assets was a subcommittee within the United States House Committee on Oversight and Government Reform. It was disbanded in 2017 at the end of the 114th United States Congress.

== Members, 114th Congress ==
Majority	Minority
John Mica, Florida, Chairman; Mike Turner, Ohio; Jimmy Duncan, Tennessee; Justin Amash, Michigan; Thomas Massie, Kentucky; Glenn Grothman, Wisconsin	Tammy Duckworth, Illinois, Ranking Member; Bonnie Watson Coleman, New Jersey; Mark DeSaulnier, California; Brendan Boyle, Pennsylvania
Ex officio
Jason Chaffetz, Utah	Elijah Cummings, Maryland

== Recent Activity ==
March 2009

The Subcommittee held its first hearing of the 111th Congress on March 25, 2009, entitled "Restoring the Financial Stability of the U.S. Postal Service: What Needs to be Done?" and Business Meeting on H.R. 626, the "Federal Employees Paid Parental Leave Act of 2009."

The Subcommittee's first activities during this Congress resulted in 28 print media clips and a feature on the 7:00 p.m. broadcast on CNN.

Chairman Stephen Lynch announced the departure of the federal workforce Staff Director, Tania A. Shand. Shand left the Subcommittee for a politically appointed position at the United States Office of Personnel Management.

On March 3, 2009, Representative Lynch introduced H.RES. 1263, "to amend title 5, United States Code, to provide for the automatic enrollment of new participants in the Thrift Savings Plan, and to clarify the method for computing certain annuities based on part-time service; to allow certain employees of the District of Columbia to have certain periods of service credited for purposes relating to retirement eligibility; and for other purposes."

On March 24, 2009, Lynch introduced H.RES.1686, "to provide for the protection and integrity of the United States mail."

== Short Subcommittee History ==
The Chairman of the Subcommittee during the 110th Congress was Representative Danny K. Davis (D-IL) with the support of Ranking Member Representative Kenny Marchant (R-TX).

Under the Chairmanship of Representative Davis and staff leadership of Tania Shand, Staff Director; Lori Hayman, Counsel; William Miles, Professional Staff and Marcus A. Williams, Clerk/Press Secretary, the Subcommittee has held 37 hearings and 15 Business Meeting during the 110th Congress.

In his August 2008 District Newsletter, Rep. Davis highlighted some of the most noteworthy accomplishments of the Subcommittee for the 110th Congress, which included, H.R. 5863, "Government Accountability Office Act of 2008," H.R. 4106, "Telework Improvements Act," H.R. 3774, "Senior Executive Service Diversity Assurance Act," and H.R. 5781, "The Federal Employees Paid Parental Leave Act of 2008."
