= United States House Oversight Subcommittee on Government Operations =

Subcommittee within the United States House Committee

Subcommittee of Committee on Oversight and Government Reform
- Active United States House of Representatives; 119th Congress

Leadership
- Chair: Pete Sessions (R)
- Ranking Member: Kweisi Mfume (D)

Structure
- Seats: 10 (10 currently filled) 6/6 4/4
- Political parties: Majority (6): Republican (6); Minority (4): Democratic (4)

Meeting place
- 2157, Rayburn House Office Building; Washington, D.C. 20515

Phone number
- (202)-225-5074

The Subcommittee on Government Operations is a subcommittee within the United States House Committee on Oversight and Government Reform. Until the 119th Congress, the subcommittee was named the Subcommittee on Government Operations and the Federal Workforce.

== Jurisdiction ==
The subcommittee has jurisdiction over the following areas:

- The federal civil service, including compensation, classification, and benefits
- Federal property disposal
- Public information and records, including the Freedom of Information Act, the National Archives and Records Administration, and the Presidential Records Act
- Government reorganizations and operations, including transparency, performance, grants management, and accounting measures generally
- The relationship between the federal government to the states and municipalities, including unfunded mandates

== Members, 119th Congress ==
Majority	Minority
Pete Sessions, Texas, Chair; Virginia Foxx, North Carolina; Gary Palmer, Alabama; Tim Burchett, Tennessee; Brian Jack, Georgia; Brandon Gill, Texas	Kweisi Mfume, Maryland, Ranking Member; Eleanor Holmes Norton, District of Columbia; Maxwell Frost, Florida; Emily Randall, Washington
Ex officio
James Comer, Kentucky	Stephen Lynch, Massachusetts (April 28 – June 24, 2025); Robert Garcia, California (from June 24, 2025)

== Historical subcommittee rosters ==
=== 115th Congress ===
Majority	Minority
Mark Meadows, North Carolina, Chairman; Jody Hice, Georgia; Jim Jordan, Ohio; Mark Sanford, South Carolina; Thomas Massie, Kentucky; Ron DeSantis, Florida; Dennis A. Ross, Florida; Rod Blum, Iowa	Gerry Connolly, Virginia, Ranking Member; Carolyn Maloney, New York; Eleanor Holmes Norton, District of Columbia; Lacy Clay, Missouri; Brenda Lawrence, Michigan; Bonnie Watson Coleman, New Jersey
Ex officio
Trey Gowdy, South Carolina	Elijah Cummings, Maryland

=== 116th Congress ===
Majority	Minority
Gerry Connolly, Virginia, Chair; Eleanor Holmes Norton, District of Columbia; John Sarbanes, Maryland; Jackie Speier, California; Brenda Lawrence, Michigan; Stacey Plaskett, U.S. Virgin Islands; Ro Khanna, California; Stephen Lynch, Massachusetts; Jamie Raskin, Maryland	Jody Hice, Georgia, Ranking Member (since March 30, 2020); Thomas Massie, Kentucky; Glenn Grothman, Wisconsin; James Comer, Kentucky; Ralph Norman, South Carolina; Greg Steube, Florida
Ex officio
Carolyn Maloney, New York	Jim Jordan, Ohio

=== 117th Congress ===
Majority	Minority
Gerry Connolly, Virginia, Chair; Eleanor Holmes Norton, District of Columbia; Danny K. Davis, Illinois; John Sarbanes, Maryland; Brenda Lawrence, Michigan; Stephen Lynch, Massachusetts; Jamie Raskin, Maryland; Ro Khanna, California; Katie Porter, California, Vice Chair	Jody Hice, Georgia, Ranking Member; Fred Keller, Pennsylvania; Andrew Clyde, Georgia; Andy Biggs, Arizona; Nancy Mace, South Carolina; Jake LaTurner, Kansas; Yvette Herrell, New Mexico
Ex officio
Carolyn Maloney, New York	James Comer, Kentucky

=== 118th Congress ===
Majority	Minority
Pete Sessions, Texas, Chair; Gary Palmer, Alabama; Clay Higgins, Louisiana; Andy Biggs, Arizona; Byron Donalds, Florida; William Timmons, South Carolina; Tim Burchett, Tennessee; Marjorie Taylor Greene, Georgia; Lauren Boebert, Colorado; Russell Fry, South Carolina; Eric Burlison, Missouri	Kweisi Mfume, Maryland, Ranking Member; Eleanor Holmes Norton, District of Columbia; Maxwell Frost, Florida; Greg Casar, Texas; Gerry Connolly, Virginia; Melanie Stansbury, New Mexico; Robert Garcia, California; Summer Lee, Pennsylvania; Jasmine Crockett, Texas; Rashida Tlaib, Michigan
Ex officio
James Comer, Kentucky	Jamie Raskin, Maryland
