= Eric Burlison =

American politician (born 1976)

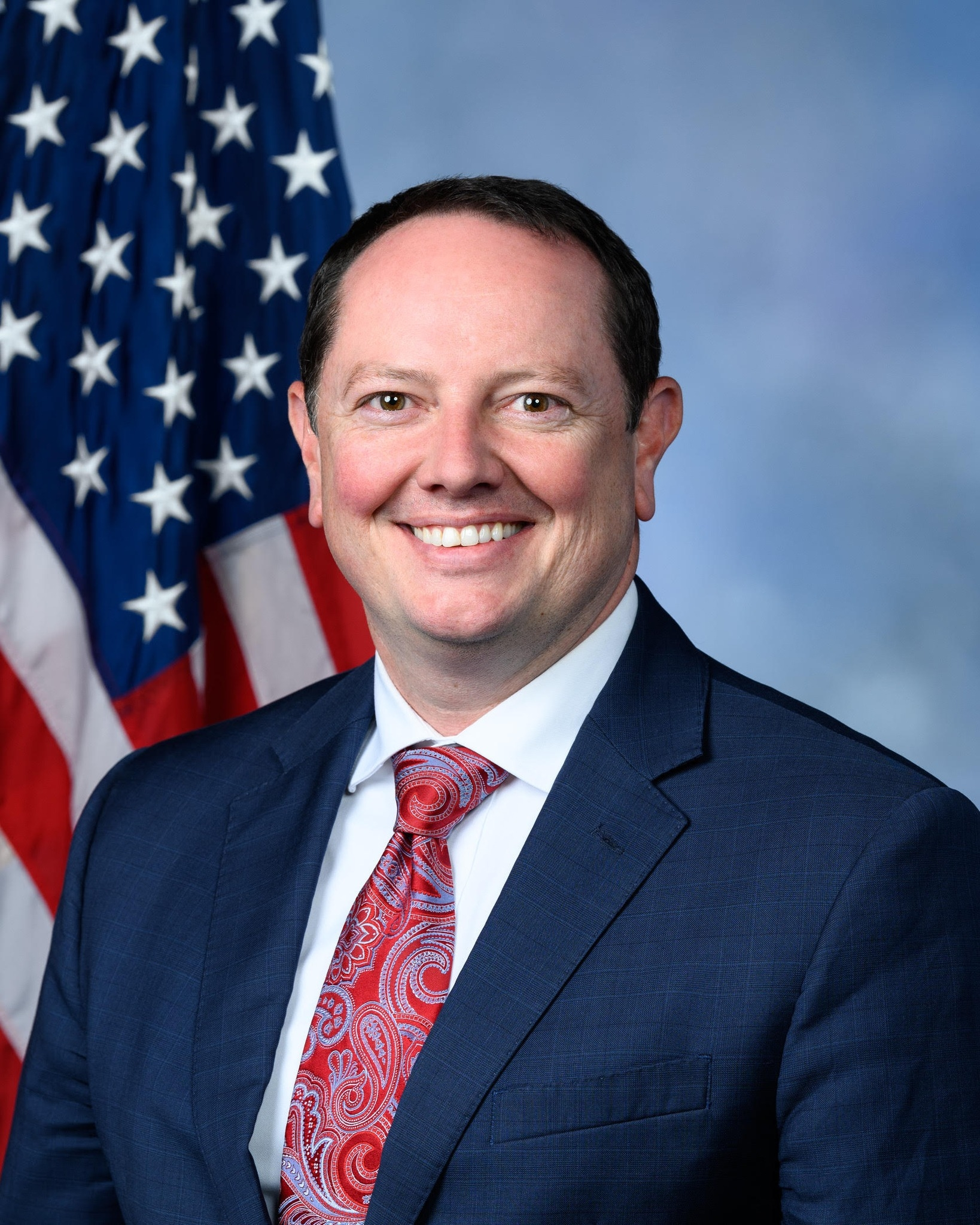
- Official portrait, c. 2023

Member of the U.S. House of Representatives from Missouri's 7th district
- Incumbent
- Assumed office January 3, 2023
- Preceded by: Billy Long

Member of the Missouri Senate from the 20th district
- In office January 9, 2019 – January 3, 2023
- Preceded by: Jay Wasson
- Succeeded by: Curtis Trent

Member of the Missouri House of Representatives from the 30th district
- In office January 5, 2009 – January 4, 2017
- Preceded by: B. J. Marsh
- Succeeded by: Kevin Austin

Personal details
- Born: Eric Wayne Burlison; October 2, 1976 (age 49) Springfield, Missouri, U.S.
- Party: Republican
- Spouse: Angie Burlison
- Children: 2
- Education: Missouri State University (BA, MBA)
- Website: House website Campaign website

Eric Wayne Burlison (born October 2, 1976) is an American politician serving as the U.S. representative from Missouri's 7th congressional district since 2023. He previously served as the representative for District 133 (Greene County) in the Missouri House of Representatives. A Republican, Burlison was elected to the Missouri House in 2008 and left office at the end of 2016. In 2018, he was elected to the Missouri Senate, representing District 20. He was reelected for a second term in the U.S House of Representatives in 2024.

Burlison is a member of the new House Department of Government Efficiency Committee. He is a strong supporter of Donald Trump, having endorsed his 2024 campaign.

== Early life and education ==
A 1995 graduate of Parkview High School in Springfield, Missouri, Burlison received a Bachelor of Arts degree in philosophy in 2000 and a Master of Business Administration in 2002 from Southwest Missouri State University.

== Early career ==
Burlison was employed at CoxHealth as a software engineer before being promoted to business analyst. He worked for Cerner through his election to the U.S. House.

Burlison is a member of the Freedom of Road Riders, Missouri Right to Life, National Rifle Association of America, and the Missouri Chamber of Commerce.

== Missouri House of Representatives ==
Burlison served in the Missouri House from 2009 to 2016. During that time, he chaired the House Committee on Professional Registration and Licensing and was vice chair of the House Special Committee on Health Insurance.

In 2011, Burlison sponsored a bill that made Missouri join the Health Care Compact. The compact became law in Missouri and seven other states.

In 2014, Burlison passed a bill to provide children with dyslexia better access to educational services. The legislation added dyslexia to a state grant program to help the families of children with disabilities pay for special education programs.

In 2016, Burlison sponsored and passed a bill to eliminate conceal and carry requirements for firearms in Missouri.

== Missouri Senate ==
In 2018, Burlison was elected to the Missouri Senate, representing the 20th District, which comprises Christian County and part of Greene County. Burlison's committee assignments included:

- Commerce, Consumer Protection, Energy and the Environment
- General Laws
- Insurance and Banking
- Professional Registration (vice chair)
- Small Business and Industry (chair)
- Joint Committee on Government Accountability
- Cyber Crime Investigation Fund Panel
- Missouri Consolidated Health Care Plan Board of Trustees
- State Records Commission

In 2022, Burlison proposed a bill to bypass a trial by jury for those who believe their use of deadly force is in self-defense. The bill received bipartisan opposition, including testimonies from law enforcement agencies and a prosecutor who described it as the “Make Murder Legal Act.”

== U.S. House of Representatives ==
=== Elections ===
==== 2022 ====
In 2022, Burlison defeated Democratic nominee Kristen Radaker-Sheafer in the race for Missouri's 7th congressional district with 70.9% of the vote to Radaker-Shefer's 26.9%. His term of office in the 118th U.S. Congress began on January 3, 2023.

=== Tenure ===
In a speech on the House floor at the start of his term, Burlison criticized DirecTV for removing Newsmax TV from its listings, despite Newsmax being caught spreading misinformation about alleged election rigging and widespread voter fraud in the 2020 election, stories consistently proven false. Newsmax later retracted and apologized for spreading this misinformation. Burlison invoked the Holocaust while condemning DirecTV's actions, alluding to, and misquoting, the poem "First they came ..." by Martin Niemoller and suggesting that cable companies were censoring conservatives.

Burlison has said that constituent town halls are "where only political nutjobs show up."

==== Abortion ====
In January 2025, Burlison introduced a bill recognizing personhood as beginning at conception.

==== Epstein files ====
Burlison has commented on the investigation of the Jeffrey Epstein client list, saying that Americans are "sick and tired" of secrets and deserve to know the truth. Burlison has not committed to signing a discharge petition or congressional measure to release the files.

==== Fiscal Responsibility Act of 2023 ====
Burlison was among the 71 Republicans who voted against final passage of the Fiscal Responsibility Act of 2023 in the House.

==== Foreign policy ====
===== Russia =====
On March 19, 2024, Burlison voted NAY to House Resolution 149 Condemning the illegal abduction and forcible transfer of children from Ukraine to the Russian Federation. He was one of nine Republicans to do so.

===== Syria =====
In 2023, Burlison was among 47 Republicans to vote in favor of H.Con.Res. 21, which directed President Joe Biden to remove U.S. troops from Syria within 180 days.

===== Israel =====
Burlison voted to provide Israel with support following 2023 Hamas attack on Israel.

==== Medicaid ====
Burlison supports cuts and adding work requirements to Medicaid.

==== Take It Down Act ====
Burlison was one of only two representatives (along with Thomas Massie) who voted against the Take It Down Act, which criminalises the publication of non-consensual intimate images and adds protections for victims of deepfake pornography and revenge porn. Burlison has not elaborated on his opposition to the bill.

==== UAPs ====
In 2024, Burlison petitioned House leadership to create a committee to study UAPs. Instead, a task force within the United States House Committee on Oversight and Government Reform — with no subpoena power — was created to investigate UAPs, among other topics; as of 2025, Burlison serves on the body. He has stated that he believes purported UAPs are either angels or manmade objects, and in 2025 introduced UAP-disclosure legislation.

In July 2025, Burlison traveled to Mexico to examine the Nazca mummies, a popular hoax alleged to be the corpses of three-fingered space aliens.

During a September 2025 hearing on UAPs, Burlison presented a 2024 video recorded by the U.S. armed forces that, according to ABC News, showed a "U.S. military Hellfire missile bouncing off a bright, shiny object that was being tracked off the coast of Yemen". In an initial assessment published the next day, Avi Loeb concluded the object was most likely a Samad drone, probably launched by Ansar Allah, a conclusion also reached by The War Zone. Later analysis, according to Interesting Engineering, "determined the object was likely a weather balloon and that the apparent velocity was an optical illusion caused by parallax".

=== Caucus memberships ===
- Congressional Motorcycle Caucus
- Freedom Caucus

=== Committee assignments ===
For the 118th Congress

- Committee on Education and the Workforce
  - Subcommittee on Health, Employment, Labor, and Pensions
  - Subcommittee on Workforce Protections
- Committee on Oversight and Accountability
  - Subcommittee on Cybersecurity, Information Technology, and Government Innovation
  - Subcommittee on Government Operations and the Federal Workforce
- Committee on Transportation and Infrastructure

For the 119th Congress:

- Committee on Oversight and Government Reform
  - Subcommittee on Economic Growth, Energy Policy, and Regulatory Affairs (chairman)
  - Subcommittee on Delivering on Government Efficiency (DOGE)
  - Task Force on the Declassification of Federal Secrets
- Committee on Transportation and Infrastructure
  - Subcommittee on Highways and Transit
  - Subcommittee on Railroads, Pipelines, and Hazardous Materials
  - Subcommittee on Water Resources and Environment

== Personal life ==
Burlison lives outside of Springfield with his wife Angie and two daughters. He attends Destiny Church in Republic, Missouri, and is active in supporting campus ministries such as The Potter's House and Campus Crusade for Christ. Burlison is involved with Big Brothers Big Sisters of the Ozarks and was named the Big Brother of the Year in 2005. He serves on the board of D.R.E.A.M and the Harmony House for battered and abused women.

Burlison is Protestant.

== Electoral history ==
=== State representative ===
2008 Election for Missouri’s 136th District House of Representatives
Party	Candidate	Votes	%	±%
Republican	Eric Burlison	11,060	57.9	
Democratic	Nick Beatty	8,047	42.1	

2010 Election for Missouri’s 136th District House of Representatives
Party	Candidate	Votes	%	±%
Republican	Eric Burlison	8,381	71.3	+13.4
Democratic	Devon Cheek	3,372	28.7	−13.4

2012 Election for Missouri’s 133rd District House of Representatives
Party	Candidate	Votes	%	±%
Republican	Eric Burlison	11,878	70.5	−0.8
Democratic	Nicholas Ivan Ladendorf	4,972	29.5	+0.8

2014 Election for Missouri's 133rd District House of Representatives
Party	Candidate	Votes	%	±%
Republican	Eric Burlison	7,047	100.00%	+29.5

=== State Senate ===
2018 Election for Missouri's 20th District Senate
Party	Candidate	Votes	%	±%
Republican	Eric Burlison	62,209	73.9%	−26.1
Democratic	Jim Bellido	22,004	26.1%	+26.1

=== U.S House of Representatives ===
2022 Election for Missouri's 7th congressional district
Party	Candidate	Votes	%	±%
Republican	Eric Burlison	178,592	70.9%	2.9%
Democratic	Kristen Radaker-Sheafer	67,485	26.8%	0.75%
Libertarian	Kevin A. Craig	5,869	2.3%	−45.2%

2024 Election for Missouri's 7th congressional district
Party	Candidate	Votes	%
Republican	Eric Burlison (incumbent)	263,231	71.5
Democratic	Missi Hesketh	96,655	26.3
Libertarian	Kevin Craig	7,982	2.2
Total votes		367,868	100.0
Republican hold			

U.S. House of Representatives
Preceded by Billy Long	Member of the U.S. House of Representatives from Missouri's 7th congressional district 2023–present	Incumbent
U.S. order of precedence (ceremonial)
Preceded by Nikki Budzinski	United States representatives by seniority 296th	Succeeded by Greg Casar
