= United States House Oversight Subcommittee on Economic Growth, Energy Policy, and Regulatory Affairs =

Subcommittee within the US House Committee

Subcommittee of Committee on Oversight and Government Reform
- Active United States House of Representatives; 119th Congress

Leadership
- Chair: Eric Burlison (R)
- Ranking Member: Maxwell Frost (D)

Structure
- Seats: 10 (10 currently filled) 6/6 4/4
- Political parties: Majority (6): Republican (6); Minority (4): Democratic (4)

Meeting place
- 2157, Rayburn House Office Building; Washington, D.C. 20515

Phone number
- (202)-225-5074

The Subcommittee on Economic Growth, Energy Policy and Regulatory Affairs is a subcommittee within the United States House Committee on Oversight and Government Reform. It was previously known as the Subcommittee on Economic and Consumer Policy.

== Jurisdiction ==
[The subcommittee] shall have oversight jurisdiction over: income inequality and policies that affect the growth and prosperity of the middle class, including education, housing, labor, trade, small business, agriculture; securities regulation; consumer protection; private sector information technology security, policy, and management; intellectual property; telecommunications; and federal acquisition policy unrelated to national security and information technology

== Members, 119th Congress ==
Majority	Minority
Eric Burlison, Missouri, Chair; Gary Palmer, Alabama; Clay Higgins, Louisiana; Byron Donalds, Florida; Scott Perry, Pennsylvania; Lauren Boebert, Colorado	Maxwell Frost, Florida, Ranking Member; Yassamin Ansari, Arizona; Ro Khanna, California; Dave Min, California
Ex officio
James Comer, Kentucky	Gerry Connolly, Virginia (until April 28, 2025); Stephen Lynch, Massachusetts (April 28–June 24, 2025); Robert Garcia, California (from June 24, 2025)

== Historical subcommittee rosters ==
=== 116th Congress ===
Majority	Minority
Raja Krishnamoorthi, Illinois, Chair; Mark DeSaulnier, California; Katie Porter, California since November 3rd, 2019; Ro Khanna, California; Ayanna Pressley, Massachusetts; Rashida Tlaib, Michigan; Gerry Connolly, Virginia	Michael Cloud, Texas, Ranking Member; Glenn Grothman, Wisconsin; James Comer, Kentucky; Chip Roy, Texas; Carol Miller, West Virginia
Ex officio
Carolyn Maloney, New York	Jim Jordan, Ohio

=== 117th Congress ===
Majority	Minority
Raja Krishnamoorthi, Illinois, Chair; Katie Porter, California; Cori Bush, Missouri; Jackie Speier, California; Hank Johnson, Georgia; Mark DeSaulnier, California; Ayanna Pressley, Massachusetts	Michael Cloud, Texas, Ranking Member; Fred Keller, Pennsylvania; Scott Franklin, Florida; Andrew Clyde, Georgia; Byron Donalds, Florida
Ex officio
Carolyn Maloney, New York	James Comer, Kentucky

=== 118th Congress ===
Majority	Minority
Pat Fallon, Texas, Chair; Byron Donalds, Florida; Scott Perry, Pennsylvania; Lisa McClain, Michigan; Lauren Boebert, Colorado; Russell Fry, South Carolina; Anna Paulina Luna, Florida; Nick Langworthy, New York; Michael Waltz, Florida	Cori Bush, Missouri, Ranking Member; Shontel Brown, Ohio; Melanie Stansbury, New Mexico; Eleanor Holmes Norton, District of Columbia; Raja Krishnamoorthi, Illinois; Ro Khanna, California
Ex officio
James Comer, Kentucky	Jamie Raskin, Maryland
