= United States House Committee on Oversight and Government Reform =

Standing committee of the United States House of Representatives

House Oversight Committee
Standing committee
- Active United States House of Representatives; 119th Congress

History
- Formed: 1927

Leadership
- Chair: James Comer (R); Since January 10, 2023
- Ranking Member: Robert Garcia (D); Since June 24, 2025

Structure
- Seats: 47 (47 currently filled) 26/26 21/21
- Political parties: Majority (26): Republican (26); Minority (21): Democratic (21)

Subcommittees
- Economic Growth, Energy Policy, and Regulatory Affairs; Military and Foreign Affairs; Cybersecurity, Information Technology, and Government Innovation; Delivering on Government Efficiency; Government Operations; Health Care and Financial Services; Federal Law Enforcement

Meeting place
- 2157, Rayburn House Office Building; Washington, D.C. 20515

Website
- oversight.house.gov (Republican) democrats-oversight.house.gov (Democratic)

Phone number
- (202)-225-5074

Rules
- House Rule X; Committee Rules (118th Congress)

The Committee on Oversight and Government Reform is the main investigative committee of the United States House of Representatives. The committee's broad jurisdiction and legislative authority make it one of the most influential and powerful panels in the House. Its chair is one of only three in the House with the authority to issue subpoenas without a committee vote or consultation with the ranking member. However, in recent history, it has become practice to refrain from unilateral subpoenas.

For the 119th Congress, James Comer was reelected to serve as chair. Jamie Raskin sought, and won, the top position on the House Judiciary Committee. Representative Gerry Connolly, who previously served as the Chair of the Oversight's Subcommittee on Government Operations during the 116th and 117th Congresses, and Alexandria Ocasio-Cortez sought the Ranking Member position. The House Democratic Steering and Policy Committee voted 34 to 27 to appoint Connolly, with the full caucus vote being 131–84. On April 28, 2025, Gerry Connolly announced that he would not seek re-election at the end of his term and that he was stepping back from his Ranking Member position. Stephen Lynch was named Acting Ranking Member pending Connolly's formal resignation from the role and the selection of a successor by the House Democratic Caucus. Connolly died on May 21, 2025.

== History ==
The panel now known as the Committee on Oversight and Government Reform was originally the Committee on Expenditures in the Executive Departments, created in 1927 to consolidate 11 separate Committees on Expenditures that had previously overseen the spending of various departments of the federal government.

The Committee on Expenditures became the Committee on Government Operations in 1952. The new name was intended to reflect the committee's broad mission: to oversee "the operations of Government activities at all levels with a view to determining their economy and efficiency".

After Republicans gained control of the House in the 1994 elections, the committee was reorganized to include seven subcommittees instead of 14. This reorganization consolidated the jurisdiction previously covered by three full committees and resulted in a 50 percent cut in staff. In 2007, a reorganization under a new Democratic majority combined the duties of the seven subcommittees into five.

In the 106th Congress, the panel was renamed the Committee on Government Reform. While retaining the agenda of the former Committee on Government Operations, the new committee also took on the responsibilities of the former House Committee on the Post Office and Civil Service and the committee on the District of Columbia. On January 4, 2007, the 110th Congress renamed it the Committee on Oversight and Government Reform. The name was changed again by the 116th Congress to the Committee on Oversight and Reform. For the 118th Congress, Republicans changed the name to Committee on Oversight and Accountability. The 119th Congress changed the name back to Committee on Oversight and Government Reform when Republicans won a Government trifecta during the 2024 United States elections. Since 2007, it has simply been called the "Oversight Committee" for short.

=== Subpoena usage ===
In 1997, the Republican majority on the committee changed its rules to allow the chair, Dan Burton (R-Indiana), to issue subpoenas without the consent of the committee's ranking Democrat. From 1997 to 2002, Burton used this authority to issue 1,052 unilateral subpoenas, many of them related to alleged misconduct by President Bill Clinton, at a cost of more than $35 million.

By contrast, from 2003 to 2005, under Tom Davis (R-Virginia) as chair, the committee issued only three subpoenas to the Bush administration.

After Republicans retook the House in the 2010 elections, the new chair, Darrell Issa (R-California), escalated the use of subpoenas again, issuing more than 100 in four years during the Obama administration. That was more than the combined total issued by the previous three chairs—Davis, Henry Waxman (D-California), and Edolphus Towns (D-New York)—from 2003 to 2010.

In July 2025 James Comer subpoenaed convicted pedophile Ghislaine Maxwell to testify before the committee, ultimately prompting her transfer to the federal penitentiary with the least security in the US after her interview with Deputy Attorney-General Todd Blanche. It was remarked by Lawrence O'Donnell in August 2025 that among former justice department leaders on Comer's list, Alexander Acosta's name was absent.

== Prominent hearings and investigations ==
Between 2000 and 2006, many major events and scandals in the Bush administration generated few or no subpoenas from the Republican-led committee. These events included the September 11 attacks; the leaking of classified information identifying Central Intelligence Agency agent Valerie Plame; CIA-backed abuses at Abu Ghraib prison; the Bush administration claim that Iraq possessed weapons of mass destruction; illegal campaign contributions by lobbyists, including Jack Abramoff; deaths and damage due to the Federal Emergency Management Agency's weak response to Hurricane Katrina; and Philip Cooney's suppression of data demonstrating the existence of global warming. After the release of the Downing Street memo, which contained incriminating information on the buildup to the Iraq War, Democrats in the minority were refused a hearing chamber and were forced to meet in the basement of the United States Capitol.

However, under Davis as chair from 2003 to 2007, the committee launched two controversial investigations. One of those investigations—triggered by the publication of Jose Canseco's memoir, Juiced—concerned the use of anabolic steroids by Major League Baseball players.

An inquiry was also made into the case of Terry Schiavo. In that investigation, which concerned the removal of a feeding tube from a woman in a persistent vegetative state, the committee issued a subpoena requiring Schiavo to "appear" so that members could "examine nutrition and hydration which incapacitated patients receive as part of their care". The objective of this, beyond providing information to committee members, was to delay the pending withdrawal of life support from Schiavo, whose wishes were in dispute, while Congress considered legislation specifically targeted at her case. Members of the Democratic minority opposed the action. Davis said it was "a legitimate legislative inquiry".

The committee also investigated World Wrestling Entertainment's wellness and drug policies, amid speculation about a possible link between steroid use and the death of WWE performer Chris Benoit.

On July 8, 2009, committee Republicans released an investigative staff report discussing the 2008 financial crisis. The report alleged that the government had caused the collapse by meddling in the United States' housing and lending market in the name of "affordable housing".

In February 2012, the committee held a hearing on the Patient Protection and Affordable Care Act's mandate that would "require all employers to cover birth control free of cost to women". Specifically, Republicans on the committee alleged that the Department of Health and Human Services's rules governing exemptions for religious institutions violated the Free Exercise Clause of the Constitution. The chair, Darrell Issa, said the hearing was "meant to be more broadly about religious freedom and not specifically about the contraception mandate in the Health Reform law".

After Aaron Swartz committed suicide on January 11, 2013, the committee investigated the Justice Department's actions in prosecuting Swartz on hacking charges. On January 28, Issa and ranking member Elijah Cummings published a letter to Attorney General Eric Holder, questioning whether prosecutors had intentionally added felony counts to increase the amount of prison time Swartz faced.

On July 10, 2019, a hearing was held by the United States House Oversight Subcommittee on Civil Rights and Civil Liberties entitled "Kids in Cages: Inhumane Treatment at the Border" on the "inhumane treatment of children and families" inside child detention centers on the southern US border. Jamie Raskin (D-MD) chaired the session which included testimony from Yazmin Juarez, the mother of Mariee who died at the age of nineteen months while detained in a United States Immigration and Customs Enforcement (ICE) center in Dilley, Texas. In his opening statement Raskin said that "hundreds of thousands of people" have responded to the "harsh policies" by deciding to "migrate now before things get even worse".

On December 2, 2024, the United States House of Representatives Oversight and Accountability Committee's COVID-19 panel issued its final report ahead of a hearing that week, which, among other things, argues for the highly controversial COVID-19 lab leak theory, or lab leak hypothesis; the idea that SARS-CoV-2, the virus that caused the COVID-19 pandemic, came from a laboratory. The report is also critical of mask mandates and lockdowns.

== Jurisdiction ==
According to House rules, the committee has jurisdiction over the following areas:

1. Federal civil service, including intergovernmental personnel; and the status of officers and employees of the United States, including their compensation, classification, and retirement.
2. Municipal affairs of the District of Columbia in general (other than appropriations).
3. Federal paperwork reduction.
4. Government management and accounting measures generally.
5. Holidays and celebrations.
6. Overall economy, efficiency, and management of government operations and activities, including Federal procurement.
7. National archives.
8. Population and demography generally, including the Census.
9. Postal service generally, including transportation of the mails.
10. Public information and records.
11. Relationship of the Federal Government to the States and municipalities generally.
12. Reorganizations in the executive branch of the Government.

== Members, 119th Congress ==
Majority	Minority
James Comer, Kentucky, Chair; Jim Jordan, Ohio; Mike Turner, Ohio; Paul Gosar, Arizona; Virginia Foxx, North Carolina; Glenn Grothman, Wisconsin; Michael Cloud, Texas; Gary Palmer, Alabama; Clay Higgins, Louisiana; Pete Sessions, Texas; Andy Biggs, Arizona; Nancy Mace, South Carolina; Pat Fallon, Texas; Byron Donalds, Florida; Scott Perry, Pennsylvania; William Timmons, South Carolina; Tim Burchett, Tennessee; Marjorie Taylor Greene, Georgia (until January 5, 2026); Lauren Boebert, Colorado; Anna Paulina Luna, Florida; Nick Langworthy, New York; Eric Burlison, Missouri; Eli Crane, Arizona; Brian Jack, Georgia; John McGuire, Virginia; Brandon Gill, Texas; Rich McCormick, Georgia (from March 25, 2026)	Robert Garcia, California (Ranking Member from June 24, 2025); Gerry Connolly, Virginia, Ranking Member (until May 21, 2025); Eleanor Holmes Norton, District of Columbia; Stephen Lynch, Massachusetts (Acting Ranking Member, April 28–June 24, 2025); Raja Krishnamoorthi, Illinois; Ro Khanna, California; Kweisi Mfume, Maryland; Shontel Brown, Ohio; Melanie Stansbury, New Mexico; Maxwell Frost, Florida; Summer Lee, Pennsylvania; Greg Casar, Texas; Jasmine Crockett, Texas, Vice Ranking Member; Emily Randall, Washington; Suhas Subramanyam, Virginia; Yassamin Ansari, Arizona; Wesley Bell, Missouri; Lateefah Simon, California; Dave Min, California; James Walkinshaw, Virginia (from September 16, 2025); Christian Menefee, Texas (from June 9, 2026); Ayanna Pressley, Massachusetts; Rashida Tlaib, Michigan

Resolutions electing members: H.Res. 13 (chair), H.Res. 14 (Ranking Member), H.Res. 31 (R), H.Res. 40 (D), H.Res. 55 (D), H.Res. 538 (Ranking Garcia), H.Res. 721 (Walkinshaw), H.Res. 1135 (McCormick), H.Res. 1352 (Menefee)

== Subcommittees ==
Subcommittee	Chair	Ranking Member
Cyber Security, Information Technology and Government Innovation	Nancy Mace (R-SC)	Shontel Brown (D-OH)
Economic Growth, Energy Policy and Regulatory Affairs	Eric Burlison (R-MO)	Maxwell Frost (D-FL)
Government Operations	Pete Sessions (R-TX)	Kweisi Mfume (D-MD)
Health Care and Financial Services	Glenn Grothman (R-WI)	Raja Krishnamoorthi (D-IL)
Military and Foreign Affairs	William Timmons (R-SC)	Suhas Subramanyam (D-VA)
Federal Law Enforcement	Clay Higgins (R-LA)	Summer Lee (D-PA)
Delivering on Government Efficiency	Tim Burchett (R-TN)	Melanie Stansbury (D-NM)

=== Panels and task forces ===
Pursuant to committee rule 14, the committee chair is authorized to appoint panels or task forces to carry out the duties and functions of the committee.

Panel or task force	Chair	Ranking Member
Task Force on the Declassification of Federal Secrets	Anna Paulina Luna (R-FL)	Jasmine Crockett (D-TX)
Task Force on Defending Constitutional Rights and Exposing Institutional Abuses	Brandon Gill (R-TX)	

== Former subcommittees ==
- Select Subcommittee on the Coronavirus Pandemic (117th–118th Congress)
  - Dissolved by James Comer at the end of the 118th Congress
- Subcommittee on Civil Rights and Civil Liberties (116th–117th Congress)
  - Dissolved by James Comer during the 118th Congress
- Subcommittee on Environment (115th Congress–117th Congress)
  - Dissolved by James Comer during the 118th Congress
- Subcommittee on Intergovernmental Affairs (115th Congress)
  - Dissolved by Elijah Cummings during the 116th Congress
- Subcommittee on Transportation and Public Assets (111th Congress–113th Congress)
  - Dissolved the end of the 114th United States Congress.

== Leadership ==
Chairs
Name	Party	State	Start	End
William Williamson	Republican	South Dakota	1927	1931
John Cochran	Democratic	Missouri	1931	1940
James O'Leary	Democratic	New York	1940	1944
Carter Manasco	Democratic	Alabama	1944	1947
Clare Hoffman	Republican	Michigan	1947	1949
William Dawson	Democratic	Illinois	1949	1953
Clare Hoffman	Republican	Michigan	1953	1955
William Dawson	Democratic	Illinois	1955	1970
Chester Holifield	Democratic	California	1970	1974
Jack Brooks	Democratic	Texas	1975	1989
John Conyers	Democratic	Michigan	1989	1995
William Clinger	Republican	Pennsylvania	1995	1997
Dan Burton	Republican	Indiana	1997	2003
Tom Davis	Republican	Virginia	2003	2007
Henry Waxman	Democratic	California	2007	2009
Ed Towns	Democratic	New York	2009	2011
Darrell Issa	Republican	California	2011	2015
Jason Chaffetz	Republican	Utah	2015	2017
Trey Gowdy	Republican	South Carolina	2017	2019
Elijah Cummings	Democratic	Maryland	2019	
Carolyn Maloney	Democratic	New York	2019	2023
Jim Comer	Republican	Kentucky	2023	present

Ranking members
Name	Party	State	Start	End
Carter Manasco	Democratic	Alabama	1947	1949
Clare Hoffman	Republican	Michigan	1949	1953
William Dawson	Democratic	Illinois	1953	1955
Clare Hoffman	Republican	Michigan	1955	1963
Walter Riehlman	Republican	New York	1963	1965
Clarence Brown	Republican	Ohio	1965	1967
Florence Dwyer	Republican	New Jersey	1967	1973
Frank Horton	Republican	New York	1973	1993
William Clinger	Republican	Pennsylvania	1993	1995
Cardiss Collins	Democratic	Illinois	1995	1997
Henry Waxman	Democratic	California	1997	2007
Tom Davis	Republican	Virginia	2007	2008
Darrell Issa	Republican	California	2009	2011
Elijah Cummings	Democratic	Maryland	2011	2019
Jim Jordan	Republican	Ohio	2019	2020
Mark Meadows	Republican	North Carolina	2020	
Jim Jordan	Republican	Ohio	2020	
Jim Comer	Republican	Kentucky	2020	2023
Jamie Raskin	Democratic	Maryland	2023	2025
Gerry Connolly	Democratic	Virginia	2025	
Stephen Lynch; Acting	Democratic	Massachusetts	2025	
Robert Garcia	Democratic	California	2025	present

== Historical membership rosters ==
=== 118th Congress ===
Majority	Minority
James Comer, Kentucky, Chair; Jim Jordan, Ohio; Mike Turner, Ohio; Paul Gosar, Arizona; Virginia Foxx, North Carolina; Glenn Grothman, Wisconsin; Michael Cloud, Texas (from December 6, 2023); Gary Palmer, Alabama; Clay Higgins, Louisiana; Pete Sessions, Texas; Andy Biggs, Arizona; Nancy Mace, South Carolina; Jake LaTurner, Kansas; Pat Fallon, Texas; Byron Donalds, Florida; Kelly Armstrong, North Dakota; Scott Perry, Pennsylvania; William Timmons, South Carolina; Tim Burchett, Tennessee; Marjorie Taylor Greene, Georgia; Lisa McClain, Michigan; Lauren Boebert, Colorado; Russell Fry, South Carolina; Anna Paulina Luna, Florida; Chuck Edwards, North Carolina (until December 6, 2023); Nick Langworthy, New York; Eric Burlison, Missouri; Mike Waltz, Florida (from December 6, 2023)	Jamie Raskin, Maryland, Ranking Member; Eleanor Holmes Norton, District of Columbia; Stephen Lynch, Massachusetts; Gerry Connolly, Virginia; Raja Krishnamoorthi, Illinois; Ro Khanna, California; Kweisi Mfume, Maryland; Alexandria Ocasio-Cortez, New York, Vice Ranking Member; Katie Porter, California; Cori Bush, Missouri; Jimmy Gomez, California; Shontel Brown, Ohio; Melanie Stansbury, New Mexico; Robert Garcia, California; Maxwell Frost, Florida; Becca Balint, Vermont (until June 22, 2023); Summer Lee, Pennsylvania; Greg Casar, Texas; Jasmine Crockett, Texas; Dan Goldman, New York; Jared Moskowitz, Florida; Rashida Tlaib, Michigan (from September 20, 2023); Ayanna Pressley, Massachusetts (from February 29, 2024)

Resolutions electing members: H.Res. 14 (chair), H.Res. 15 (Ranking Member), H.Res. 70 (R), H.Res. 71 (D), H.Res. 704 (D), H.Res. 913 (R), H.Res. 1034 (D)

Subcommittees

Subcommittee	Chair	Ranking Member
Cyber Security, Information Technology and Government Innovation	Nancy Mace (R-SC)	Gerry Connolly (D-VA)
Economic Growth, Energy Policy and Regulatory Affairs	Pat Fallon (R-TX)	Cori Bush (D-MO)
Government Operations and the Federal Workforce	Pete Sessions (R-TX)	Kweisi Mfume (D-MD)
Health Care and Financial Services	Lisa McClain (R-MI)	Katie Porter (D-CA)
National Security, the Border, and Foreign Affairs	Glenn Grothman (R-WI)	Robert Garcia (D-CA)
Coronavirus Pandemic (Select)	Brad Wenstrup (R-OH)	Raul Ruiz (D-CA)

=== 117th Congress ===
Majority	Minority
Carolyn Maloney, New York, Chair; Eleanor Holmes Norton, District of Columbia; Stephen Lynch, Massachusetts; Jim Cooper, Tennessee; Gerry Connolly, Virginia; Raja Krishnamoorthi, Illinois; Jamie Raskin, Maryland; Ro Khanna, California; Kweisi Mfume, Maryland; Alexandria Ocasio-Cortez, New York; Rashida Tlaib, Michigan; Katie Porter, California; Cori Bush, Missouri; Danny Davis, Illinois; Debbie Wasserman Schultz, Florida; Peter Welch, Vermont; Hank Johnson, Georgia; John Sarbanes, Maryland; Jackie Speier, California; Robin Kelly, Illinois; Brenda Lawrence, Michigan; Mark DeSaulnier, California; Jimmy Gomez, California, Vice Chair; Ayanna Pressley, Massachusetts; Shontel Brown, Ohio (from December 1, 2021)	James Comer, Kentucky, Ranking Member; Jim Jordan, Ohio; Paul Gosar, Arizona (until November 12, 2021); Virginia Foxx, North Carolina; Jody Hice, Georgia; Glenn Grothman, Wisconsin; Michael Cloud, Texas; Bob Gibbs, Ohio; Clay Higgins, Louisiana; Ralph Norman, South Carolina; Pete Sessions, Texas; Fred Keller, Pennsylvania; Andy Biggs, Arizona; Andrew Clyde, Georgia; Nancy Mace, South Carolina; Scott Franklin, Florida; Jake LaTurner, Kansas; Pat Fallon, Texas; Yvette Herrell, New Mexico; Byron Donalds, Florida; Mike Flood, Nebraska (from July 13, 2022)

Sources: H.Res.9 (chair), H.Res.10 (Ranking Member) H.Res.62 (D), H.Res.63 (R), H.Res.789 (Removing Paul Gosar), H.Res.825 (D - Shontel Brown), H.Res.1225 (R - Mike Flood)

=== 116th Congress ===
Majority	Minority
Elijah Cummings, Maryland, Chair; Carolyn Maloney, New York; Eleanor Holmes Norton, District of Columbia; Lacy Clay, Missouri; Stephen Lynch, Massachusetts; Jim Cooper, Tennessee; Gerry Connolly, Virginia; Raja Krishnamoorthi, Illinois; Jamie Raskin, Maryland; Harley Rouda, California; Katie Hill, California, Vice Chair; Debbie Wasserman Schultz, Florida; John Sarbanes, Maryland; Peter Welch, Vermont; Jackie Speier, California; Robin Kelly, Illinois; Mark DeSaulnier, California; Brenda Lawrence, Michigan; Stacey Plaskett, U.S. Virgin Islands; Ro Khanna, California; Jimmy Gomez, California; Alexandria Ocasio-Cortez, New York; Ayanna Pressley, Massachusetts; Rashida Tlaib, Michigan	Jim Jordan, Ohio, Ranking Member; Justin Amash, Michigan; Paul Gosar, Arizona; Virginia Foxx, North Carolina; Thomas Massie, Kentucky; Mark Meadows, North Carolina; Jody Hice, Georgia; Glenn Grothman, Wisconsin; James Comer, Kentucky; Michael Cloud, Texas; Bob Gibbs, Ohio; Clay Higgins, Louisiana; Ralph Norman, South Carolina; Chip Roy, Texas; Carol Miller, West Virginia; Mark Green, Tennessee; Kelly Armstrong, North Dakota; Greg Steube, Florida

Sources: H.Res. 24 (chair), H.Res. 25 (Ranking Member), H.Res. 67 (D), H.Res. 68 (R)

==== Membership changes ====
The Oversight and Government Reform Committee underwent numerous membership changes over the course of the 116th United States Congress.

- July 10, 2019: Fred Keller (R-PA) added to committee roster. H.Res. 481
- October 17, 2019: Elijah Cummings (D-MD) died. Carolyn Maloney (D-NY) became acting chair.
- November 3, 2019: Vice Chair Katie Hill (D-CA) resigned.
- November 20, 2019: Carolyn Maloney elected permanent chair. H.Res. 725
- December 19, 2019: Katie Porter (D-CA) and Deb Haaland (D-NM) added to committee roster. H.Res. 773
- February 27, 2020: Ro Khanna (D-CA) added to committee roster, ranking after Harley Rouda. H.Res. 870
- March 21, 2020: Ranking Member Jim Jordan (R-OH) stepped down to assume the Ranking Membership of the Judiciary Committee; Mark Meadows (R-NC) assumes Ranking Membership.
- March 30, 2020: Mark Meadows (R-NC) resigned to become White House Chief of Staff. Jim Jordan resumes Ranking Membership temporarily.
- May 8, 2020: Kweisi Mfume (D-MD) added to committee roster, ranking after Harley Rouda. H.Res. 954
- June 29, 2020: James Comer (R-KY) elected permanent Ranking Member.
- July 1, 2020: Gary Palmer (R-AL) added to committee roster, ranking after Michael Cloud. H.Res. 1037

Subcommittees

Subcommittee	Chair	Ranking Member
Civil Rights and Civil Liberties	Jamie Raskin (D-MD)	Chip Roy (R-TX)
Economic and Consumer Policy	Raja Krishnamoorthi (D-IL)	Michael Cloud (R-TX)
Environment	Harley Rouda (D-CA)	James Comer (R-KY)
Government Operations	Gerry Connolly (D-VA)	Mark Meadows (R-NC)
National Security	Stephen Lynch (D-MA)	Jody Hice (R-GA)
Coronavirus Crisis (Select)	Jim Clyburn (D-SC)	Steve Scalise (R-LA)

=== 115th Congress ===
Majority	Minority
Trey Gowdy, South Carolina, Chair; Jimmy Duncan, Tennessee; Darrell Issa, California; Jim Jordan, Ohio; Mark Sanford, South Carolina; Justin Amash, Michigan; Paul Gosar, Arizona; Scott DesJarlais, Tennessee; Michael Cloud, Texas; Virginia Foxx, North Carolina; Thomas Massie, Kentucky; Mark Meadows, North Carolina; Dennis A. Ross, Florida; Mark Walker, North Carolina; Rod Blum, Iowa; Jody Hice, Georgia; Steve Russell, Oklahoma; Glenn Grothman, Wisconsin; Will Hurd, Texas; Gary Palmer, Alabama; James Comer, Kentucky; Paul Mitchell, Michigan; Greg Gianforte, Montana	Elijah Cummings, Maryland, Ranking Member; Carolyn Maloney, New York; Eleanor Holmes Norton, District of Columbia; Lacy Clay, Missouri; Stephen Lynch, Massachusetts; Jim Cooper, Tennessee; Gerry Connolly, Virginia, Vice Ranking Member; Robin Kelly, Illinois; Brenda Lawrence, Michigan; Ted Lieu, California; Bonnie Watson Coleman, New Jersey; Stacey Plaskett, U.S. Virgin Islands; Brendan Boyle, Pennsylvania; Val Demings, Florida; Raja Krishnamoorthi, Illinois; Jamie Raskin, Maryland; Jimmy Gomez, California; Peter Welch, Vermont; Matt Cartwright, Pennsylvania; Mark DeSaulnier, California; John Sarbanes, Maryland

Sources: H.Res. 6 (chair), H.Res. 7 (Ranking Member), H.Res. 45 (D) H.Res. 51 (R), H.Res. 52, H.Res. 95 and H.Res. 127 (D)

== See also ==
- List of United States House of Representatives committees
