= Stacey Plaskett =

Governor-elect of the US Virgin Islands (born 1966)

Governor-elect of the United States Virgin Islands
- Assuming office January 4, 2027
- Lieutenant: Milton Potter (elect)
- Succeeding: Albert Bryan Jr.

Delegate to the U.S. House of Representatives from the U.S. Virgin Islands' at-large district
- Incumbent
- Assumed office January 3, 2015
- Preceded by: Donna Christensen

Personal details
- Born: Stacey Elizabeth Plaskett; May 13, 1966 (age 60) New York City, New York, U.S.
- Party: Democratic (2008–present)
- Other political affiliations: Republican (before 2008)
- Spouse: Jonathan Buckney-Small
- Children: 5
- Education: Georgetown University (BS); American University (JD)
- Website: House website Campaign website
- Plaskett's voice Plaskett on Virgin Island History Month. Recorded March 16, 2022

Stacey Elizabeth Plaskett (/ˈplæskɪt/ PLASS-kit; born May 13, 1966) is an American politician and attorney who is the governor-elect of the United States Virgin Islands. She has served since 2015 as the delegate to the United States House of Representatives from the United States Virgin Islands' at-large congressional district. Plaskett has practiced law in New York City, Washington, D.C., and the U.S. Virgin Islands.

Before 2008, Plaskett was a member of the Republican Party, and was appointed by President George W. Bush to serve in the Civil Division of the United States Department of Justice. She switched to the Democratic Party in late 2008 because she believed it was a better place to have new ideas heard. She served as a House manager (prosecutor) during the second impeachment trial of Donald Trump, the first non-voting House member to do so.

In April 2026, Plaskett announced her candidacy for governor of the United States Virgin Islands in the 2026 gubernatorial election. She is the second woman and third delegate to Congress in history to become the Democratic nominee. She is the first woman to be elected governor of the United States Virgin Islands, and the first black woman elected governor of a U.S. territory and of a U.S. jurisdiction.

== Early life and education ==
Plaskett was born on May 13, 1966, in Brooklyn, New York, and grew up in the Bushwick housing projects. Her parents are both from Saint Croix, U.S. Virgin Islands. Her father was a New York City Police Department officer and her mother a clerk in the court system. Her family regularly traveled to St. Croix during her childhood, so she became familiar with island traditions and culture.

Her parents' home in New York was often home for students and other recent migrants moving to the mainland from the U.S. Virgin Islands. She attended Brooklyn Friends School (a Quaker school) and Grace Lutheran Elementary. She was recruited by A Better Chance, Inc., a nonprofit organization recruiting minority students to selective secondary schools. She was a boarding student at Choate Rosemary Hall, where she was a varsity athlete and served as class president for several years.

Plaskett spent a term abroad in France during her enrollment at Choate. She has said that Choate awakened her commitment to public service and a deep sense of responsibility to others through the biblical verse "to whom much is given; much is required". She was one of few black students while she attended the school. In 1988, she graduated with a degree in history and diplomacy from the Edmund A. Walsh School of Foreign Service at Georgetown University.

Plaskett ran for student government at Georgetown under a progressive student ticket and was very active in the Anti-Apartheid Movement. As a student she spoke on behalf of universities in the DC area at the General Assembly of the United Nations. She received her J.D. degree from the American University Washington College of Law in 1994. She attended law school at night while working full-time during the day with the lobbying arm of the American Medical Association and then with the law firm Jones Day. In law school she studied constitutional law under her future colleague, Representative Jamie Raskin.

== Career ==
After graduating from law school, Plaskett accepted a position as an assistant district attorney in the Bronx, New York, under Robert T. Johnson. She prosecuted several hundred cases, including in the Narcotics Bureau. She then worked as a consultant and legal counsel focused on internal corporate investigations and strategy for the Mitchell Madison Group. She moved to Washington, D.C., and worked as counsel on the Republican-led U.S. House of Representatives Committee on Standards of Official Conduct, now known as the House Committee on Ethics or the Ethics Committee. She left the Committee when she was asked by mentor and fellow trustee at Choate, Robert McCallum, to work at the United States Department of Justice as a political appointee of then-President George W. Bush.

Plaskett accepted the offer and served as counsel for the assistant attorney general for the DOJ Civil Division, and also as acting deputy assistant attorney general for the Torts Branch in the Civil Division. She then joined the staff of Deputy Attorney General Larry Thompson, primarily working on the Justice Honors program and an initiative to increase the number of minority and women attorneys at the Justice Department. While in the Justice Civil Division, she also worked on the Terrorism Litigation Task Force, the September 11th Victim Compensation Fund and United States v. Philip Morris, the case against several major tobacco companies for violations of the Racketeer Influenced and Corrupt Organizations Act (RICO) by engaging in a conspiracy to deceive the public about the health effects of smoking.

After Thompson resigned, Plaskett joined the staff of his successor, James Comey. She later left government service to become a deputy general counsel at UnitedHealth Group. There, she worked in the Americhoice division, handling legal work related to Medicaid and Medicare programs. She then moved to the U.S. Virgin Islands, where she worked in private practice and from 2007 to 2014 served as general counsel for the Virgin Islands Economic Development Authority, charged with the economic development of the U.S. territory.

Plaskett switched from the Republican Party to the Democratic Party in late 2008. She was initiated into the St. Croix Alumnae Chapter of Delta Sigma Theta sorority in 2019.

During a 2023 MSNBC interview, Plaskett said that Donald Trump "needs to be shot" before correcting herself and saying that he needed to be stopped. This resulted in several conservative commentators calling for her resignation.

In January 2025, Plaskett protested the non-voting rights in Congress for the five delegates and one resident commissioner (Puerto Rico) for the U.S. Virgin Islands, American Samoa, the District of Columbia, Guam, the Northern Mariana Islands, and Puerto Rico, and denounced U.S. colonialism in these territories.

== U.S. House of Representatives ==
=== Elections ===
==== 2012 ====
In 2012, Plaskett challenged nine-term delegate Donna Christian-Christensen in the Democratic Party primary. Plaskett was unsuccessful, receiving 42.49% of the vote to Christian-Christensen's 57.48%.

==== 2014 ====
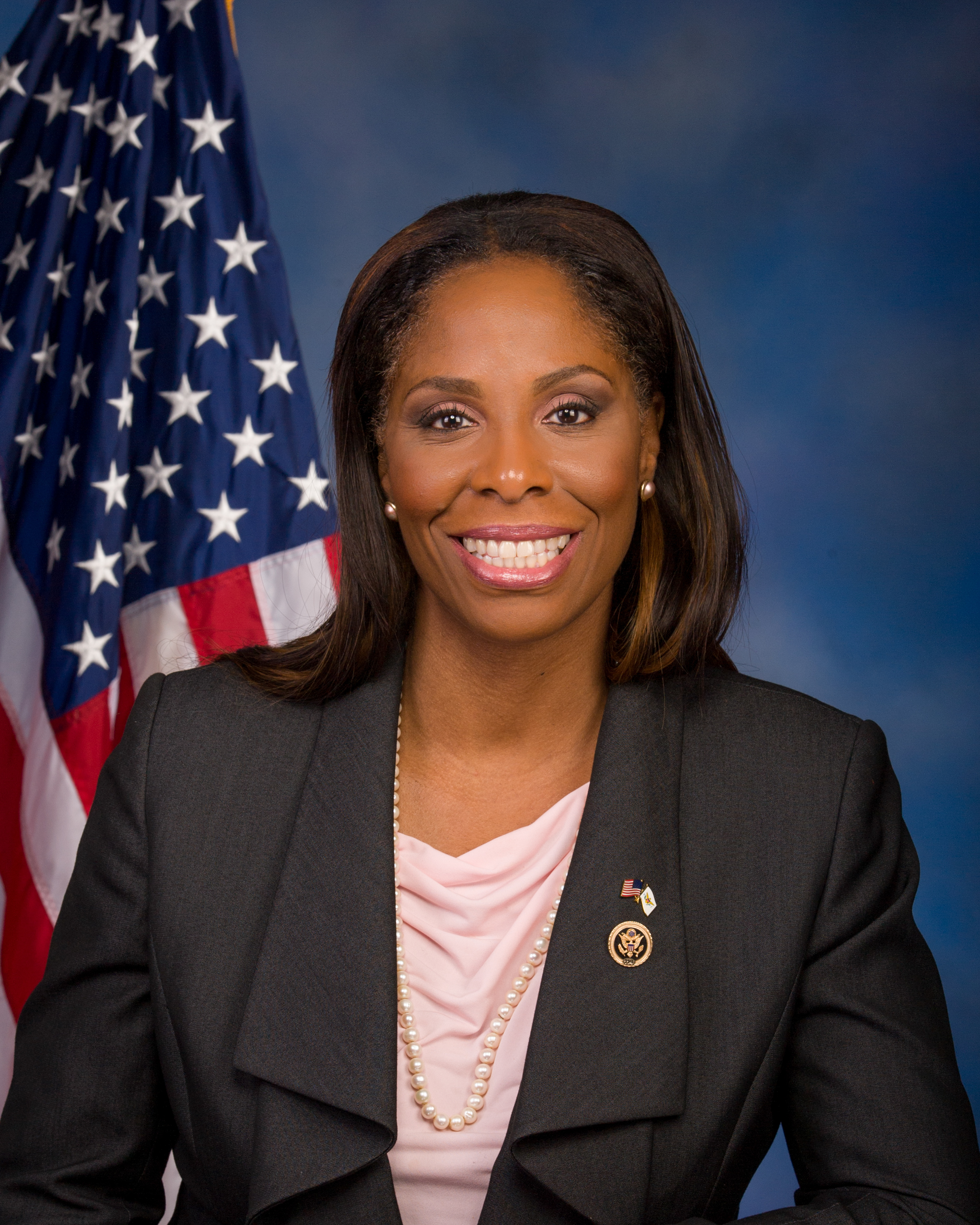
Plaskett in 2015

In 2014, Plaskett ran for the office again, after formally declaring her candidacy in November 2013. In the Democratic primary held on August 2, she faced Shawn-Micheal Malone, a Virgin Islands Senator, and Senate President, and Emmett Hansen, a former Virgin Islands Senator and former chair of the Democratic Party of the Virgin Islands. She received 50.4% of the vote to Malone's 41.61% and Hansen's 7.92%. She defeated Republican nominee Vince Danet in the general election held on November 4 with over 90% of the vote.

==== 2016 ====
Plaskett was challenged in the Democratic primary by former Virgin Islands Senator Ronald Russell. She defeated Russell with 85.48% of the vote to his 14.04%. In the general election, she faced Republican Gordon Ackley, an Air Force veteran and business owner, who ran as a write-in candidate. She won in a landslide, garnering almost 98% of the vote.

==== 2018 ====
Plaskett won reelection unopposed in both the Democratic primary and the general election.

==== 2020 ====
Plaskett won reelection, defeating independent candidate Shekema George with 88.09% of the vote.

=== Impeachment manager ===
On January 12, 2021, Plaskett was named a House impeachment manager for the second impeachment trial of Donald Trump in response to the storming of the United States Capitol on January 6, 2021. During the trial on February 10, 2021, she was introduced by lead impeachment manager Jamie Raskin of Maryland, her former constitutional law professor, who said she was "an 'A' student then and she is an 'A+' student now".

=== Weaponization Subcommittee ===
On February 2, 2023, Plaskett was appointed by Minority Leader Hakeem Jeffries as the Ranking Member of the United States House Judiciary Select Subcommittee on the Weaponization of the Federal Government. Plaskett has criticized multiple decisions made by the Republican majority, saying in her opening statement of the select subcommittee's first hearing, "I'm deeply concerned about the use of the select subcommittee as a place to settle scores, showcase conspiracy theories and advance an extreme agenda that risks undermining Americans' faith in our democracy."

On March 2, 2023, Plaskett and Judiciary Committee Ranking Member Jerrold Nadler released a staff report titled GOP Witnesses: What Their Disclosures Indicate About The State Of The Republican Investigations, in which they criticized three alleged whistleblowers (George Hill, Garret O'Boyle, and Stephen Friend) who had transcribed interviews with the Select Subcommittee. The report claims that the three are the only ones who have been transcribed out of "dozens and dozens of whistleblowers" who have had discussions with House Judiciary Republicans. In the report, Subcommittee Democrats doubt the three whistleblowers' credibility, saying they are heavily MAGA-biased and had no evidence of actual FBI misconduct.

=== Committee assignments ===
118th Congress–present

- Permanent Select Committee on Intelligence
  - Subcommittee on National Intelligence Enterprise (Ranking Member)
  - Subcommittee on Defense Intelligence and Overhead Architecture

117th Congress–present

- Committee on the Budget (117th Congress, 119th-present)
- Committee on Ways and Means
  - Subcommittee on Oversight
  - Subcommittee on Select Revenue Measures

Past memberships

- Committee on Agriculture (114th Congress–February 28, 2023, 118th Congress)
  - Subcommittee on Nutrition
  - Subcommittee on Biotechnology, Horticulture and Research (Chair, 117th Congress)
  - Subcommittee on Livestock and Foreign Agriculture
  - Subcommittee on Commodity Exchanges, Energy and Credit
- Committee on Oversight and Government Reform (114th–116th Congresses)
  - Subcommittee on Government Operations
  - Subcommittee on Interior
- Judiciary Select Subcommittee on the Weaponization of the Federal Government (Ranking Member, 118th Congress)

=== Caucus memberships ===
- New Democrat Coalition (Leadership Member)
- Congressional Black Caucus
- Climate Solutions Caucus
- Congressional Blockchain Caucus
- Congressional Caucus on Turkey and Turkish Americans
- United States–China Working Group

== Controversies ==
=== Connection to Jeffrey Epstein ===
In 2018, Plaskett received $30,000 in campaign contributions from Jeffrey Epstein, who was at the time her constituent and a known sex offender. Plaskett was criticized in 2019 after Epstein was arrested on July 6 for sex-trafficking crimes, and on July 9 she "reversed course" from her previous decision to keep the money. She became the first politician to announce she would give away Epstein's political donations, saying the funds would benefit The Women's Coalition and The Family Resource Center.

In 2023, six Epstein accusers sued Plaskett and other U.S. Virgin Islands officials, alleging that they helped and benefited from Epstein's sex-trafficking enterprise in the U.S. territory. Their claims were voluntarily dismissed with prejudice.

==== Texting with Epstein during Congressional hearing ====
In November 2025, newly released documents showed that during Michael Cohen's February 2019 testimony to the House Oversight Committee, Plaskett received and responded to text messages from Epstein before, during, and after her questions. Epstein directed her to question Cohen about Trump's executive assistant, Rhona Graff, and messaged her "Good work" after her questioning concluded. Plaskett responded that Epstein's ownership of Little Saint James made him a constituent of the U.S. Virgin Islands. A vote to censure her over these texts failed, largely along party lines.

== Personal life ==
Plaskett is married to Jonathan Buckney Small, a community activist and former professional tennis player. She has five children, four of them with Andre Duffy, her previous husband. She has served on numerous nonprofit boards focused primarily on education, culture, and community development. Plaskett is Lutheran.

== See also ==
- List of African-American statewide elected officials
- List of African-American United States representatives
- List of female governors in the United States
- Women in the United States House of Representatives
- Timeline of African-American firsts

U.S. House of Representatives
Preceded by Donna Christian-Christensen	Delegate to the U.S. House of Representatives from the Virgin Islands' at-large congressional district 2015–present	Incumbent
Party political offices
Preceded by Albert Bryan Jr.	Democratic nominee for Governor of the United States Virgin Islands; 2026	Most recent
Political offices
Preceded by Albert Bryan Jr.	Governor of the United States Virgin Islands; Taking office 2027	Elect
U.S. order of precedence (ceremonial)
Preceded by Eleanor Holmes Norton	United States delegates by seniority 2nd	Succeeded by Amata Coleman Radewagen
