= United States congressional subcommittee =

Subdivision of a United States congressional committee

A congressional subcommittee in the United States Congress is a subdivision of a United States congressional committee that considers specified matters and reports back to the full committee.

Subcommittees are formed by most committees to share specific tasks within the jurisdiction of the full committee. Subcommittees are responsible to, and work within the guidelines established by, their parent committees. In particular, standing committees usually create subcommittees with legislative jurisdiction to consider and report bills. They may assign their subcommittees such specific tasks as the initial consideration of measures and oversight of laws and programs in the subcommittees' areas. Service on subcommittees enables members to develop expertise in specialized fields. Subcommittees diffuse the legislative process. For the most part, they are independent, autonomous units with written jurisdictions, and, pursuant to longstanding practice, most bills are referred by a full committee to them.

General requirements for establishing subcommittees are established in House or Senate rules, but specifics with respect to subcommittee assignments and their jurisdiction are left up to the parent committees. Committees have wide latitude to increase or decrease the number of subcommittees from one congress to the next, including renaming or reassigning jurisdiction among previous subcommittees. Some committees, like the House and Senate Appropriations Committees, often retain a predictable subcommittee structure from year to year, due to the set duties of each subcommittee in drafting annual spending bills. However, even these committees are not immune to organizational changes. New subcommittees on Homeland Security were created in 2003 to handle funding for the Department of Homeland Security, and underwent a joint reorganization during the 110th Congress to better coordinate annual appropriations between the House and Senate.

The respective party conferences in both the House and Senate also provide their own rules, traditions, and precedents with respect to the subcommittee assignments, chairmanship of subcommittees, and even the number of subcommittees members can serve on.

== House subcommittees ==
House Rule XI states: the "Rules of the House are the rules of its committees and subcommittees so far as applicable...." According to clause 1(a)(2) of the same rule, "each subcommittee of a committee is a part of that committee, and is subject to the authority and direction of that committee and to its rules, so far as applicable."

Subcommittee sizes and party ratios are determined by the full committee, usually in concert with the party leadership. Although negotiations are often held with the minority, these prerogatives remain with the majority. Generally, subcommittee ratios reflect the same ratio as that of a full committee, which in turn reflects the ratio of majority to minority members in the full House. Discussions on subcommittee sizes and ratios traditionally begin soon after the November election, and often are completed by the convening of the early organization meetings, usually held in November or December. Final decisions are made after committee assignments are ratified on the House floor. Seat changes within a Congress can necessitate adjusting subcommittee sizes and ratios.

House Rule X, which provides for the creation of standing committees, limits committees to five subcommittees each, though committees that also have an oversight subcommittee are permitted six subcommittees. Several committees are allowed to exceed this limit, due to the detailed nature of their jurisdiction. The Armed Services and Foreign Affairs and Oversight and Government Reform committees each have seven subcommittees, the Transportation and Infrastructure Committee is allowed six subcommittees, without also requiring an oversight subcommittee, and the Appropriations Committee has twelve subcommittees plus a select oversight panel on intelligence. House rules also prohibit any full committee from establishing subunits that last longer than six months. If they do, then the new subunit counts against the subcommittee limit.

Subcommittee jurisdictions are not enumerated in the House rules, and are determined by each committee. Several committees establish specific subcommittee jurisdictions in committee rules. Pursuant to the jurisdiction of the full committee, most legislation is referred by the committee to a subcommittee prior to consideration by the full committee. However, some committees retain specific legislation at the full-committee level. For example, the Ways and Means Committee keeps legislation amending the income tax sections of the Internal Revenue Code at full committee, and the Natural Resources Committee retains matters relating to Native Americans for the full committee.

House Rules further require that every full committee with more than 20 members must establish a subcommittee on oversight, though this requirement does not limit the ability of the full committee or its other subcommittees to exercise oversight over programs and agencies under their jurisdiction.

=== Service on subcommittees ===
House rules are silent on how members are assigned to subcommittees, as this practice is traditionally governed by party rules and practices.

House Rule X generally restricts members of Congress to service on no more than two standing committees and no more than four subcommittees within each of those committees, with some exceptions. For example, the chairman and ranking member of the full committee are allowed to serve ex officio on their subcommittees without that service being subject to the limitation. Also, service on any temporary investigative subcommittees established by the Committee on Standards of Official Conduct does not count. Finally, representatives can request waivers from their respective party caucus or conference to serve on additional committees or subcommittees

=== House Democratic Caucus ===
Democratic Caucus Rule 26, which addresses subcommittees "when the Democratic party is the majority," states that no subcommittee can be more than 60% of the size of a full committee. It further states that the resident commissioner and delegates should not be counted in determining subcommittee (or committee) size.

House Democrats allow each committee member to bid, in order of seniority, for available subcommittee leadership slots. For all committees, except Appropriations, this is done by full-committee seniority; for Appropriations, it is done by subcommittee seniority. Caucus rules generally limit Members to chair only one full committee or one subcommittee with legislative jurisdiction. Subcommittee leaders selected for the Appropriations Committee, Energy and Commerce Committee, and Ways and Means Committee require Democratic Steering and Policy Committee approval.

=== House Republican Conference ===
Republican Conference rules are silent on subcommittee size and ratio issues. Each committee chair determines and provides to other Republican members of the committee the method for selecting subcommittee chairs. However, a majority of the Republican Members of the full committee can disapprove the selection procedure. Republican Conference rules changes for the 108th Congress required subcommittee chairs of the Appropriations Committee to receive full conference approval. Under House rules, subcommittee chairs are limited to six years of service. Republicans also limit members to a single committee or subcommittee chairmanship; the chairmanships of the Standards of Official Conduct Committee and the House Administration Committee are exempt, thereby allowing a Member to chair either of these panels and an additional panel. Finally, Republican Conference rules prohibit a full-committee chair from leading a subcommittee of the committee they head. Republicans generally leave assignment decisions to the committee leader to determine, although most employ a bidding approach that allows members to select subcommittee slots. Chairmen are limited to six years as the ranking member on a committee, with time spent as chairman and as ranking minority member counting towards the limit. Since the rule has come into force in 1995, waivers have been granted, though very rarely.

== Senate subcommittees ==
Given the smaller size of the senate, there are fewer members competing for committee and subcommittee assignments. The Standing Rules of the Senate do not establish any limits on the number of subcommittees a standing or select committee may establish, and gives more latitude to the committees in determining their subcommittee organization and membership. The Senate prohibits committees from creating any subunit other than a subcommittee, unless authorized by specific resolution approved by the full Senate.

=== Service on subcommittees ===
Senate rules do place some limits on subcommittees. The Senate classifies its committees into three categories, known as A, B, or C committees. Senate Rule 25 restricts all senators to service on no more than three committees, two A committees and one B or C Committee. Party rules further restrict assignments to no more than one among the so-called Super A Committees of Appropriations, Armed Services, Finance, and Foreign Relations.

Senators are limited to service on no more than three subcommittees on each of the A Committees they serve on, and no more than two subcommittees from B or C Committees. The chairman and ranking member of full committees are permitted to serve ex officio on any of their committee's subcommittees.

Senators are further restricted by Rule 25 to chair no more than one subcommittee on each of the full committees they are a member of. There are additional restrictions for a chairman of an A Committee. The chairmen is limited to chair only one subcommittee on each A Committee they serve on. This restriction even extends to committees they don't chair.

Chairmen of Class B or C committees are prohibited from serving as chair of any subcommittee of any committee they chair, and are similarly restricted to serving as chair of only one Class A subcommittee.

=== Senate Democratic Caucus ===
Senate Democratic Caucus rules are not publicly available, so it is hard to determine how those rules apply to subcommittee assignments. However, unlike their Republican counterparts, Democratic chairmen and ranking members are not limited to six-year terms nor are chairmen of full committees prohibited from serving as chairmen of their own committee's subcommittees.

=== Senate Republican Conference ===
Republican Conference rules place additional restrictions on senators, including term limits of 6 years as a committee chairman plus 6 years as ranking member.

- A chair/ranking member of an A committee may not serve as chair/ranking member of any subcommittees. Appropriations subcommittee chairmanships are exempt.
- A chair/ranking member of a non-A committee, excluding Ethics, may not serve as chair/ranking member of more than one subcommittee. Appropriations subcommittee chairmanships are not exempt.
- The chair/vice chair of the Ethics Committee may serve on no more than two standing subcommittees.
- A Senator may not serve as chair/ranking member of more than two subcommittees.
- A Senator shall not serve more than 6 years as chair of any standing committee, effective January 1997, plus 6 years as ranking member of a committee. Once a Senator served 6 years chairing a committee, the term would be over. However, if a Senator served 6 years as a ranking minority member, the Senator could serve as chair if the party controls the chamber.

== See also ==
- List of United States House of Representatives committees, for a complete list of current House committees and subcommittees
- List of United States Senate committees, for a complete list of current Senate committees and subcommittees
- List of United States congressional joint committees, for a complete list of current Joint committees and subcommittees
- List of defunct United States congressional committees, for an incomplete list of defunct committees and subcommittees
