= Committee on Small Business =

Committee on Small Business or Small Business Committee can refer to:

- United States House Committee on Small Business
  - United States House Small Business Subcommittee on Health and Technology
  - United States House Small Business Subcommittee on Agriculture, Energy and Trade
  - United States House Small Business Subcommittee on Contracting and Workforce
  - United States House Small Business Subcommittee on Investigations, Oversight and Regulations
  - United States House Small Business Subcommittee on Economic Growth, Tax and Capital Access
- United States Senate Committee on Small Business and Entrepreneurship
