= Melissa Bean =

American politician (born 1962)

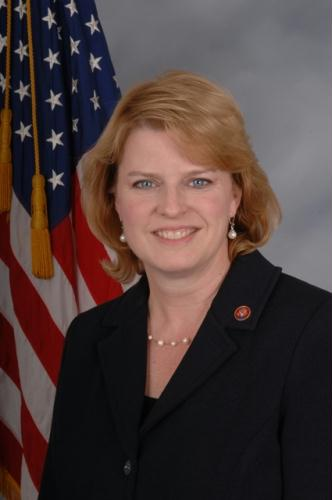

Member-elect of the U.S. House of Representatives from Illinois's 8th district
- Assuming office January 3, 2027
- Succeeding: Raja Krishnamoorthi
- In office January 3, 2005 – January 3, 2011
- Preceded by: Phil Crane
- Succeeded by: Joe Walsh

Personal details
- Born: Melissa Luburich; January 22, 1962 (age 64) Chicago, Illinois, U.S.
- Party: Democratic
- Spouse: Alan Bean (m. 1985)
- Children: 2
- Education: Oakton College (attended); Roosevelt University (BA)
- Website: Campaign website

Melissa Luburich Bean (née Luburich; born January 22, 1962) is an American politician who served as the U.S. representative for Illinois's 8th congressional district from 2005 to 2011. A member of the Democratic Party, Bean is set to return to her old seat after winning the 2026 U.S. House election.

== Early life and education ==
Bean grew up in a Serbian-American family in the Chicago suburbs, where her adopted father was a machine belt factory owner. She attended Maine East High School before graduating from Oakton Community College with an associate degree in 1982 and from Roosevelt University in 2000 with a bachelor's degree.

== Early career ==
Prior to her election to congress, Bean was president of a home-based business, Sales Resources Inc.

=== 2002 U.S. House campaign ===
In 2002, Bean was defeated by 73-year-old 8th district Republican incumbent Phil Crane, who had held the seat for 33 years. However, Bean managed 43 percent of the vote, surprising observers from both parties, given that the national party offered almost no financial support to her campaign.

=== 2004 U.S. House campaign ===
Bean rematched against Crane in 2004. This time, Bean raised almost as much money as Crane, mainly from small donors. In contrast, Crane received most of his donations from political action committees. Despite Republican efforts to help Crane, Bean defeated him with 52 percent of the vote, a margin of roughly four percentage points. George W. Bush carried the district in the concurrently-held presidential election by 12 points. When Bean took office on January 3, 2005, she became the first Democrat to represent the district since it was formed in 1935.

== U.S. House of Representatives ==
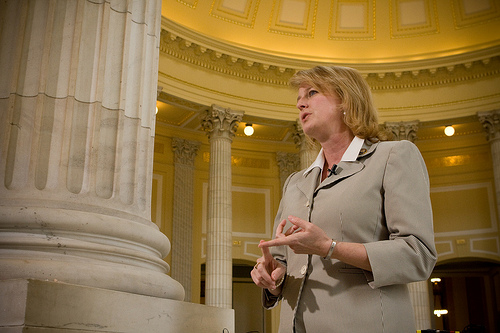
Bean speaking in the Capitol, 2010.

Bean was a member of the moderate Blue Dog Coalition and the pro-business New Democrat Coalition. She served on the Small Business and Financial Services committees after being granted a waiver by Democratic leadership.

=== Committee assignments ===
- Committee on Financial Services
  - Subcommittee on Capital Markets, Insurance and Government Sponsored Enterprises
  - Subcommittee on Financial Institutions and Consumer Credit
- Committee on Small Business
  - Subcommittee on Finance and Tax
  - Subcommittee on Contracting and Technology
  - Subcommittee on Regulations, Healthcare and Trade

=== 2010 defeat ===
Bean was challenged by Republican nominee Joe Walsh and Green Party nominee Bill Scheurer, an anti-Iraq war candidate. Although Bean was heavily favored, she lost to Walsh by 291 votes. Bean was endorsed by the Chicago Tribune, the Chicago Sun-Times, The Daily Herald, and the Lake County News-Sun.

== Post-congressional career ==
In 2011, Bean became President and CEO of the Executives Club of Chicago. After serving as chair of Midwest operations for JPMorgan Chase, she became CEO of Mesirow Wealth Advisors, part of Mesirow Financial, in 2019.

=== 2026 U.S. House campaign ===
In September 2025, Bean announced her intention to run for her old congressional seat after a 15-year absence. The incumbent, five-term fellow Democrat Raja Krishnamoorthi, was running for the U.S. Senate. She was subsequently endorsed by Leading the Future super PAC backed by Andreessen Horowitz and OpenAI. On March 17, 2026, Bean won the Democratic nomination after defeating candidates such as Junaid Ahmed- who was endorsed by prominent progressive lawmakers such as Rep. Alexandria Ocasio-Cortez (D-N.Y.) and Sens. Bernie Sanders (I-Vt.) and Elizabeth Warren (D-Mass.)- and Dan Tully.

== Political positions ==
=== Tax cuts and finance ===
In her first year in Congress in 2005, Bean was one of nine House Democrats to vote with Republicans to extend tax cuts on capital gains and dividends, a vote which House Democratic Leader Nancy Pelosi called "immoral". She also departed from the Democrats in 2006 to vote to extend about $70 billion in the Bush tax cuts (she was one of just 15 Democrats to back the legislation). She also voted to repeal the estate tax and voted in favor of a presidential line-item veto — votes that earned her the moniker "Tax Hero" from the anti-tax group Citizens Against Government Waste. Bean voted for the American Recovery and Reinvestment Act of 2009.

=== Free trade ===
Bean was one of only 15 Democrats to vote in favor of the Central American Free Trade Agreement (CAFTA), a vote which lost her the endorsement of the AFL-CIO and other unions who viewed her vote as a betrayal, but gained her the support of — and awards from — the United States Chamber of Commerce. She co-sponsored the 2009 Employee Free Choice Act, though it did not become law.

=== Environment ===
Bean supported the House Democratic cap-and-trade bill in 2009, which would have capped carbon emissions from major U.S. sources and provided economic incentives for industries that reduce their emissions.

=== Iraq war ===
Bean supported the Iraq war, but opposed President George W. Bush's troop "surge" in 2006.

=== Healthcare ===
Bean supports abortion rights and voted in support of the Affordable Care Act. Bean was one of four Democrats to vote against the James Zadroga 9/11 Health and Compensation Act of 2010, joining 155 of 159 Republicans in defeating the bill.

== Electoral history ==
Illinois's 8th congressional district: Results 2002–2008
Year	Democratic	Votes	Pct	Republican	Votes	Pct	3rd Party	Party	Votes	Pct	
2002	Melissa L. Bean	70,626	43%	Philip M. Crane	95,275	57%					*
2004	Melissa L. Bean	139,792	52%	Philip M. Crane	130,601	48%					
2006	Melissa L. Bean	93,355	51%	David McSweeney	80,720	44%	Bill Scheurer	Moderate	8,502	5%	*
2008	Melissa L. Bean	146,563	60%	Steve Greenberg	97,931	40%					
2010	Melissa L. Bean	97,824	48.3%	Joe Walsh	98,115	48.5%	Bill Scheurer	Green	6,494	3.2%	
*Write-in and minor candidate notes: In 2002, Chuck Kelecic received 25 votes. In 2006, minor candidates received 817 votes.

== Personal life ==
Bean lives in unincorporated Palatine Township with her husband and two girls. Their residence was in the 8th District when they moved there, but became part of the 10th District because of redistricting. Bean is Serbian Orthodox.

== See also ==
- Women in the United States House of Representatives

U.S. House of Representatives
Preceded by Phil Crane	Member of the U.S. House of Representatives from Illinois's 8th congressional district 2005–2011	Succeeded by Joe Walsh
Preceded by Raja Krishnamoorthi	Member of the U.S. House of Representatives from Illinois's 8th congressional district Taking office 2027	Elect
U.S. order of precedence (ceremonial)
Preceded by Rahm Emanuel as Former U.S. Representative	Order of precedence of the United States as Former U.S. Representative	Succeeded by Aaron Schock as Former U.S. Representative
