= United States House Small Business Subcommittee on Economic Growth, Tax, and Capital Access =

Subcommittee of Committee on Small Business
- Active United States House of Representatives; 119th Congress

Leadership
- Chair: Beth Van Duyne (R)
- Ranking Member: LaMonica McIver (D)

Structure
- Seats: 10 (8 currently filled) 4/5 4/5
- Political parties: Majority (4): Republican (4); Minority (4): Democratic (4)

Meeting place
- 2361, Rayburn House Office Building; Washington, D.C. 20515

Phone number
- (202)-225-5821

The House Small Business Subcommittee on Economic Growth, Tax and Capital Access is one of five subcommittees of the House Small Business Committee and is responsible for evaluating the operation of financial markets in the United States as well as their ability to provide small businesses with the capital they need. The subcommittee also reviews federal programs, but especially those that are being overseen by the Small Business Administration which is aimed at helping assist entrepreneurs in obtaining needed business capital. Since the tax policy also plays an integral role in access to capital, the committee also examines the impact of federal tax policies on small businesses.

== Jurisdiction ==
From the subcommittee website:

This Subcommittee will evaluate the operation of the financial markets in the United States and their ability to provide needed capital to small businesses. In addition, the Subcommittee will review federal programs, especially those overseen by the SBA, aimed at assisting entrepreneurs in obtaining needed capital. Since the tax policy plays an integral role in access to capital, this Subcommittee also will examine the impact of federal tax policies on small businesses.

== Members, 119th Congress ==
Majority	Minority
Beth Van Duyne, Texas, Chair; Dan Meuser, Pennsylvania; Nick LaLota, New York; Rob Bresnahan, Pennsylvania; Kimberlyn King-Hinds, Northern Mariana Islands	LaMonica McIver, New Jersey, Ranking Member; Morgan McGarvey, Kentucky; George Latimer, New York; Herb Conaway, New Jersey; Maggie Goodlander, New Hampshire
Ex officio
Roger Williams, Texas	Nydia Velázquez, New York

== Historical membership rosters ==
=== 115th Congress ===
Majority	Minority
Dave Brat, Virginia, Chairman; Steve Knight, California; Trent Kelly, Mississippi; Jenniffer Gonzalez, Puerto Rico; Brian Fitzpatrick, Pennsylvania	Dwight Evans, Pennsylvania, Ranking Member; Judy Chu, California; Stephanie Murphy, Florida; Yvette Clarke, New York

=== 116th Congress ===
Majority	Minority
Andy Kim, New Jersey, Chair; Sharice Davids, Kansas; Brad Schneider, Illinois; Adriano Espaillat, New York; Antonio Delgado, New York; Jason Crow, Colorado	Kevin Hern, Oklahoma, Ranking Member; Ross Spano, Florida; Amata Coleman Radewagen, American Samoa; Pete Stauber, Minnesota

=== 117th Congress ===
Majority	Minority
Sharice Davids, Kansas, Chair; Marie Newman, Illinois; Judy Chu, California; Dwight Evans, Pennsylvania; Andy Kim, New Jersey; Carolyn Bourdeaux, Georgia	Dan Meuser, Pennsylvania, Ranking Member; Andrew Garbarino, New York; Young Kim, California; Beth Van Duyne, Texas; Byron Donalds, Florida
Ex officio
Nydia Velázquez, New York	Blaine Luetkemeyer, Missouri

=== 118th Congress ===
Majority	Minority
Dan Meuser, Pennsylvania, Chair; Blaine Luetkemeyer, Missouri; Beth Van Duyne, Texas; Mark Alford, Missouri; Nick LaLota, New York	Greg Landsman, Ohio, Ranking Member; Dean Phillips, Minnesota; Judy Chu, California; Sharice Davids, Kansas; Jared Golden, Maine
Ex officio
Roger Williams, Texas	Nydia Velázquez, New York
