= Nick LaLota =

American politician and businessman (born 1978)

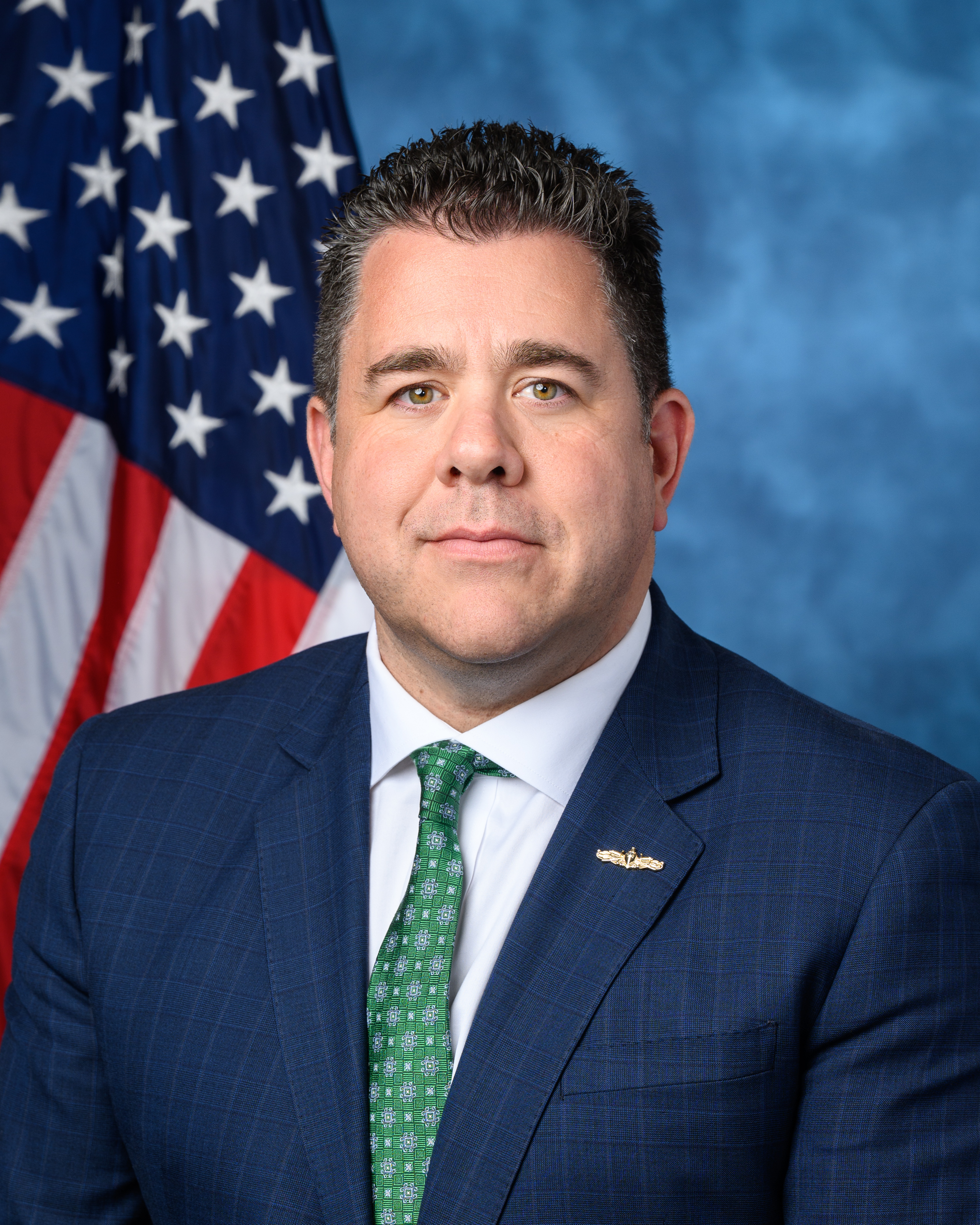
- Official portrait, 2022

Member of the U.S. House of Representatives from New York's 1st district
- Incumbent
- Assumed office January 3, 2023
- Preceded by: Lee Zeldin

Personal details
- Born: Nicholas Joseph LaLota; June 23, 1978 (age 48) Bay Shore, New York, U.S.
- Party: Republican
- Spouse: Kaylie
- Children: 3
- Education: United States Naval Academy (BS); Hofstra University (MBA, JD)
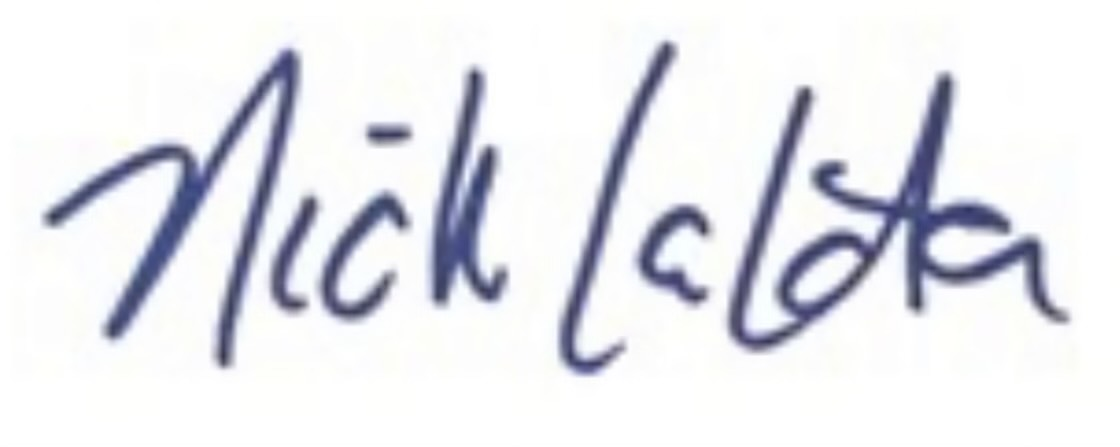
- Signature
- Website: House website Campaign website

Military service
- Allegiance: United States
- Branch/service: United States Navy
- Years of service: 2000–2007
- Rank: Lieutenant
- Unit: Surface Warfare Officer

Nicholas Joseph LaLota (/ləˈloʊtə/ lə-LOH-tə; born June 23, 1978) is an American politician and veteran serving since 2023 as the U.S. representative for New York's 1st congressional district. He is a member of the Republican Party.

LaLota was first elected to Congress in 2022. He is a member of the moderate Republican Governance Group.

== Early life and career ==
LaLota was born on June 23, 1978, and is from Bay Shore, New York. He graduated from St. Anthony's High School and, in 2000, from the United States Naval Academy. He served in the U.S. Navy for eight years, serving three overseas deployments. He earned a Master of Business Administration and a Juris Doctor from Hofstra University. LaLota served as chief of staff to Suffolk County presiding officer Kevin McCaffrey. He also served on the Suffolk Board of Elections as well as a trustee for the village of Amityville, New York.

== U.S. House of Representatives ==
=== Elections ===
==== 2022 ====
LaLota ran for the United States House of Representatives in the first congressional district of New York to succeed Lee Zeldin, who ran for governor of New York. He won the general election on November 8 by defeating the Democratic nominee Bridget Fleming.

On December 27, 2022, LaLota became one of the first Republicans to call for a full House Ethics Committee investigation into the false claims made by his fellow Long Island Republican, representative-elect George Santos. "New Yorkers deserve the truth and House Republicans deserve an opportunity to govern without this distraction", LaLota said. On March 7, 2024, during President Joe Biden's State of the Union address, Santos posted on social media that he planned to run against LaLota in the 2024 Republican primary.

==== 2024 ====
LaLota sought reelection in 2024. He defeated Democratic nominee John Avlon.

=== Tenure ===
LaLota was sworn in on January 7, 2023. During his tenure he has been described as a moderate Republican.

In 2023, LaLota was one of 18 Republicans who voted against Jim Jordan's nomination for Speaker of the House all three times.

In September 2024, LaLota was one of six Republicans to sign a bipartisan letter spearheaded by centrist House Representatives in which they pledged to respect the results of the 2024 presidential election.

=== Political positions ===
==== Immigration ====
In 2026, LaLota was a cosponsor of the DIGNIDAD Act, which proposes a pathway to legal status for up to 12 million illegal immigrants, paired with stricter border enforcement and mandatory work and restitution requirements.

==== LGBT rights ====
In 2026, LaLota publicly expressed opposition to banning same-sex marriage, repeal the Respect for Marriage Act, or otherwise undermine the Obergefell v. Hodges Supreme Court ruling, saying, "If government is going to be in the marriage business, it cannot discriminate based upon any of the protected classes, including sexual orientation."

==== Surveillance ====
In January 2026, LaLota was one of 57 Republicans who voted against blocking funding for federally driven “kill switch” vehicle technology, allowing regulators to move forward with systems that could monitor drivers and intervene in vehicle operation.

=== Committee assignments ===
For the 119th Congress:

- Committee on Appropriations
  - Subcommittee on Financial Services and General Government (Vice Chair)
  - Subcommittee on Legislative Branch
  - Subcommittee on Military Construction, Veterans Affairs, and Related Agencies
- Committee on Small Business
  - Subcommittee on Contracting and Infrastructure (Chairman)
  - Subcommittee on Economic Growth, Tax, and Capital Access

=== Caucus memberships ===
- Climate Solutions Caucus
- Republican Main Street Partnership
- Republican Governance Group
- Problem Solvers Caucus
- SALT Caucus
- For Country Caucus
- Long Island Sound Caucus (co-chair)
- Shellfish Caucus

== Personal life ==
LaLota married his high school sweetheart, Kaylie, who is a physical education teacher at Northport High School. They have three daughters. LaLota resides in Amityville, New York.

LaLota is Catholic.

== Electoral history ==
=== 2026 ===
2026 United States House of Representatives election in New York, District 1
Party	Candidate	Votes	%
Republican	Nick LaLota		
Conservative	Nick LaLota		
Total	Nick LaLota (incumbent)	152,546	51.09%
Democratic	Christopher Gallant	145,869	48.85%
Write-in		170	.06%
Total votes			
Republican hold			

=== 2024 ===
2024 United States House of Representatives election in New York, District 1
Party	Candidate	Votes	%
Republican	Nick LaLota	200,802	49.0
Conservative	Nick LaLota	25,483	6.2
Total	Nick LaLota (incumbent)	226,285	55.2
Democratic	John P. Avlon	181,647	44.3
Common Sense Suffolk	John P. Avlon	1,893	0.5
Total	John P. Avlon	183,540	44.8
Write-in		275	0.1
Total votes		410,100	100.0
Republican hold			

=== 2022 ===
2022 United States House of Representatives Republican primary in New York, District 1
Party	Candidate	Votes	%
Republican	Nick LaLota	12,015	47.3
Republican	Michelle Bond	7,015	27.6
Republican	Anthony M. Figliola	6,391	25.1
Total votes		25,421	100.0

2022 United States House of Representatives election in New York, District 1
Party	Candidate	Votes	%
Republican	Nick LaLota	154,046	48.3
Conservative	Nick LaLota	22,994	7.2
Total	Nick LaLota	177,040	55.5
Democratic	Bridget Fleming	135,170	42.4
Working Families	Bridget Fleming	6,737	2.1
Total	Bridget Fleming	141,907	44.5
Write-in		48	0.0
Total votes		318,995	100.0
Republican hold			

U.S. House of Representatives
Preceded by Lee Zeldin	Member of the U.S. House of Representatives from New York's 1st congressional district 2023–present	Incumbent
U.S. order of precedence (ceremonial)
Preceded by Kevin Kiley	United States representatives by seniority 324th	Succeeded by Greg Landsman
