= United States House Small Business Subcommittee on Oversight, Investigations, and Regulations =

Subcommittee of Committee on Small Business
- Active United States House of Representatives; 119th Congress

Leadership
- Chair: Mark Alford (R)
- Ranking Member: Derek Tran (D)

Structure
- Seats: 11 (10 currently filled) 5/6 5/5
- Political parties: Majority (5): Republican (5); Minority (5): Democratic (5)

Meeting place
- 2361, Rayburn House Office Building; Washington, D.C. 20515

Phone number
- (202)-225-5821

The House Small Business Subcommittee on Investigations, Oversight and Regulations is one of five subcommittees of the House Small Business Committee. The subcommittee was formed for the 107th Congress, when the Subcommittee on Government Programs and Oversight and the Subcommittee on Regulatory Reform and Paperwork Reduction were merged to create the Subcommittee on Regulatory Reform and Oversight. The first chair of that subcommittee was Mike Pence. During the 110th and 111th Congresses, it was renamed the Subcommittee on Investigations and Oversight. Since the 113th Congress, it has been called the Subcommittee on Investigations, Oversight, and Regulations.

== Jurisdiction ==
From the subcommittee website:

This Subcommittee will review the regulatory burdens imposed on small businesses by federal agencies and how those burdens may be alleviated. This Subcommittee will also probe the efficient operation of government programs that affect small businesses, including the SBA, and develop proposals to make them operate in a more efficient manner.

== Members, 119th Congress ==
Majority	Minority
Mark Alford, Missouri, Chair; Beth Van Duyne, Texas; Brad Finstad, Minnesota; Troy Downing, Montana	Derek Tran, California, Ranking Member; Gil Cisneros, California; LaMonica McIver, New Jersey; Lateefah Simon, California; Maggie Goodlander, New Hampshire
Ex officio
Roger Williams, Texas	Nydia Velázquez, New York

== Historical membership rosters ==
=== 118th Congress ===
Majority	Minority
Beth Van Duyne, Texas, Chair; Mark Alford, Missouri; Eli Crane, Arizona; Aaron Bean, Florida; Wesley Hunt, Texas	Kweisi Mfume, Maryland, Ranking Member; Marie Gluesenkamp Perez, Washington; Jared Golden, Maine
Ex officio
Roger Williams, Texas	Nydia Velázquez, New York

=== 117th Congress ===
Majority	Minority
Dean Phillips, Minnesota, Chair; Angie Craig, Minnesota; Kweisi Mfume, Maryland; Judy Chu, California; Dwight Evans, Pennsylvania; Sharice Davids, Kansas	Beth Van Duyne, Texas, Ranking Member; Jim Hagedorn, Minnesota; Dan Meuser, Pennsylvania; Byron Donalds, Florida; Scott L. Fitzgerald, Wisconsin
Ex officio
Nydia Velázquez, New York	Blaine Luetkemeyer, Missouri

=== 116th Congress ===
Majority	Minority
Judy Chu, California, Chair; Dwight Evans, Pennsylvania; Angie Craig, Minnesota	Ross Spano, Florida, Ranking Member; Tim Burchett, Tennessee

=== 115th Congress ===
Majority	Minority
Trent Kelly, Mississippi, Chairman; Rod Blum, Iowa; Don Bacon, Nebraska; Roger Marshall, Kansas; Ron Estes, Kansas	Alma Adams, North Carolina, Ranking Member

=== 114th Congress ===
Majority	Minority
Cresent Hardy, Nevada, Chairman	Yvette Clarke, North York, Ranking Member

=== 113th Congress ===
Majority	Minority
David Schweikert, Arizona, Chairman	Yvette Clarke, New York, Ranking Member

=== 112th Congress ===
Majority	Minority
Sam Graves, Missouri, Chairman	Jason Altmire, Pennsylvania, Ranking Member

=== 111th Congress ===
Majority	Minority
Jason Altmire, Pennsylvania, Chairman	Mary Fallin, Oklahoma, Ranking Member

=== 110th Congress ===
Majority	Minority
Jason Altmire, Pennsylvania, Chairman	Mary Fallin, Texas, Ranking Member

=== 109th Congress ===
Majority	Minority
Todd Akin, Missouri, Chairman	Madeleine Bordallo, Guam, Ranking Member

=== 108th Congress ===
Majority	Minority
Mike Pence, Indiana, Chairman	Bill Pascrell, Pennsylvania, Ranking Member

=== 107th Congress ===
Majority	Minority
Mike Pence, Indiana, Chairman	Bill Pascrell, Pennsylvania, Ranking Member
