= Rob Bresnahan =

American politician (born 1990)

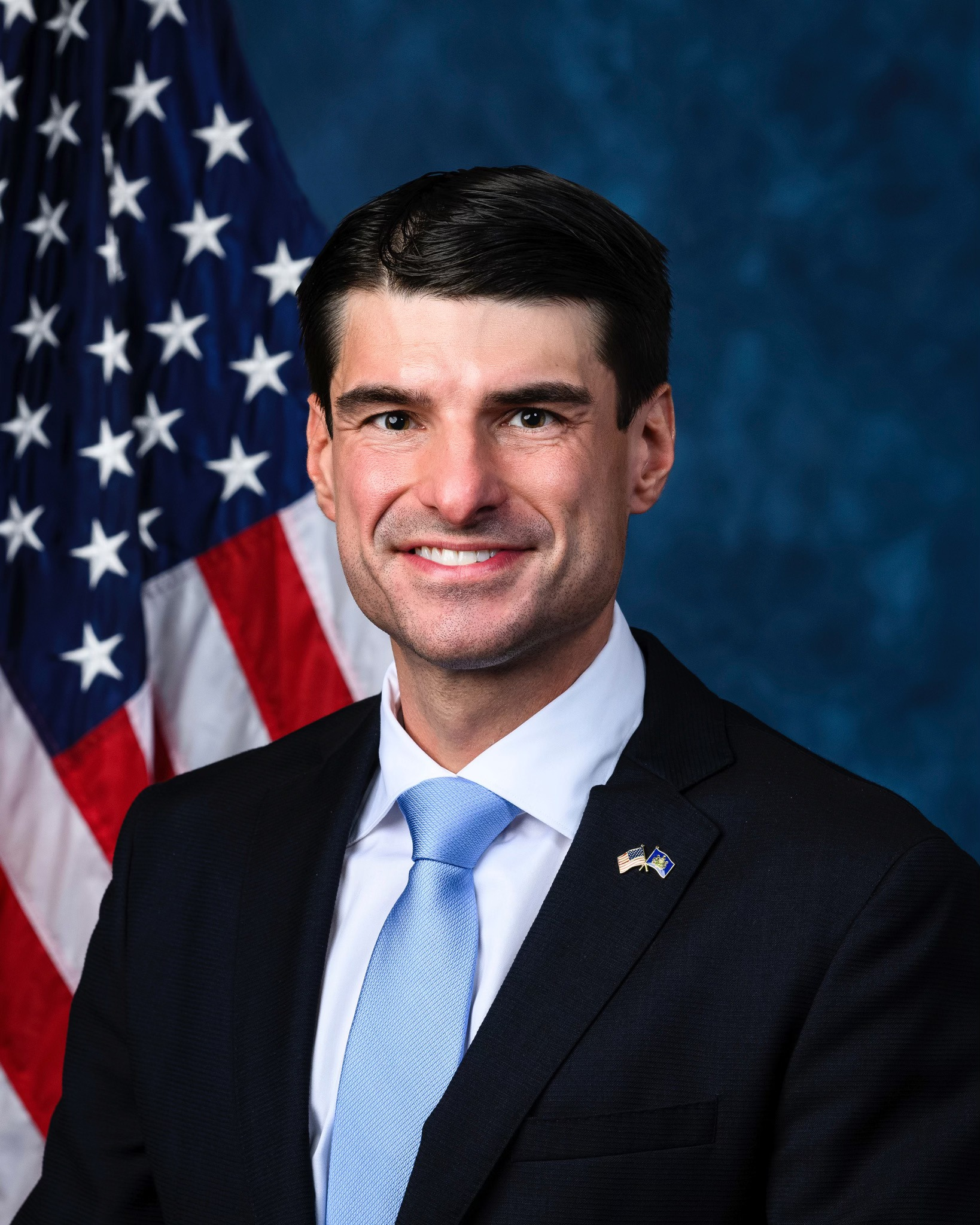
- Official portrait, 2025

Member of the U.S. House of Representatives from Pennsylvania's 8th district
- Incumbent
- Assumed office January 3, 2025
- Preceded by: Matt Cartwright

Personal details
- Born: Robert Paul Bresnahan Jr. April 22, 1990 (age 36) Kingston, Pennsylvania, U.S.
- Party: Republican
- Spouse: Chelsea Strub (m. 2025)
- Education: University of Scranton (BA)
- Website: House website Campaign website

Robert Paul Bresnahan Jr. (/ˈbrɛznəhæn/ BREZ-nə-han; born April 22, 1990) is an American politician and businessman serving as the United States representative for Pennsylvania's 8th congressional district since 2025. He is a member of the Republican Party.

He defeated incumbent Matt Cartwright in the 2024 election. He took office on January 3, 2025. He ran for re-election, losing to Democrat Paige Cognetti in the 2026 election.

== Early life and education ==
Bresnahan was born on April 22, 1990, in Kingston, Pennsylvania. He grew up in Wyoming, Pennsylvania. Bresnahan graduated from Wyoming Seminary in 2008. Bresnahan later studied business at the University of Scranton and was on the golf team. He graduated from the university in 2012.

== Early career ==
At the age of 19, Bresnahan became the chief financial officer of his grandfather's highway electrical business, Kuharchik Construction in Exeter, Pennsylvania. After graduating from the University of Scranton, Bresnahan took over as CEO in 2013.

In 2023, Bresnahan partnered Kuharchik Construction with Midwestern Electric near Chicago, Illinois.

Bresnahan is the owner of RPB Ventures, a real estate development company. The bulk of Bresnahan's real estate projects are on and around Main Street in Pittston, Pennsylvania.

Bresnahan has served on a number of voluntary boards in Northeastern Pennsylvania including as interim president of the SPCA of Luzerne County board of directors, past president of Wyoming Rotary Club, and treasurer of the TecBRIDGE board and Automated Vehicle Coalition.

He also served on the boards for Junior Achievement of NEPA, Big Brothers Big Sisters of NEPA, Luzerne County Industrial Development Authority, National Electrical Contractors Association and IBEW 163.

Currently, Bresnahan serves on the boards of the SPCA of Luzerne County, Forty Fort Cemetery Association, and Catholic Youth Center.

== United States Representative ==
=== Elections ===
In October 2023, Bresnahan filed to run for the Republican nomination for Pennsylvania's 8th congressional district. The district includes Lackawanna County, Wayne County, and Pike County along with the majority of Luzerne County and Monroe County in Northeastern Pennsylvania. In the November 2024 general election, Bresnahan defeated incumbent Democrat Matt Cartwright 51% to 49%.

Bresnahan ran for re-election in 2026. He was defeated by Paige Cognetti, the Mayor of Scranton, in the November 2026 general election 54% to 46%.

=== Tenure ===
In May 2025, Bresnahan voted for the One Big Beautiful Bill Act.

In September 2025, Bresnahan co-sponsored a bill to raise the federal minimum wage based on regional cost of living.

In June 2026, Bresnahan voted against the war powers resolution to end the Iran war.

=== Committee assignments ===
For the 119th Congress:

- Committee on Agriculture
  - Subcommittee on Conservation, Research, and Biotechnology
  - Subcommittee on Commodity Markets, Digital Assets, and Rural Development
- Committee on Transportation and Infrastructure
  - Subcommittee on Aviation
  - Subcommittee on Economic Development, Public Buildings and Emergency Management
  - Subcommittee on Highways and Transit (Vice Chair)
- Committee on Small Business
  - Subcommittee on Economic Growth, Tax, and Capital Access
  - Subcommittee on Innovation, Entrepreneurship, and Workforce Development

=== Caucus memberships ===
Bresnahan's caucus memberships include:

- Main Street Caucus
- Problem Solvers
- Republican Governance Group
- Congressional Bipartisan Opportunity Youth Caucus, co-chair
- Modern Ag Caucus, vice chair of nutrition

== Personal life ==
Bresnahan married Chelsea Strub, a former news anchor and reporter at WNEP-TV, on August 16, 2025.

Bresnahan's net worth is estimated at $48 million. In April 2025, The New York Times reported that Bresnahan, who had campaigned on prohibiting stock trading by members of Congress, reported 264 stock trades, purchasing up to $1.7 million in stock since taking office in January 2025. Some of the trades involved industries overseen by a committee on which he served, and dozens of his trades were made during the 2025 stock market crash, which followed the Trump administration issuing the Liberation Day tariffs.

By August 2025, Bresnahan had engaged in 626 stock trades worth $7.24 million. The number of trades made Bresnahan the second-most active stock trader in the 119th Congress. Bresnahan said he planned to establish a blind trust in May 2025, but that the House Ethics Committee's rules made the process difficult. Bresnahan says that he does not personally trade stock, and instead his financial advisors do the trades.

In November 2025, NBC News reported that Bresnahan sold $130,000 worth of stock in Centene, Elevance Health, UnitedHealth and CVS Health on May 15. These trades happened a week before he voted for the One Big Beautiful Bill Act, which included large cuts in Medicaid funding. The four companies manage about half of all Medicaid accounts. Just prior to selling the Medicaid-related stocks, he introduced legislation to ban congressional stock trading and said he was moving his holdings into a blind trust. By 2026, records showed he had stopped trading stocks.

== Electoral history ==
Pennsylvania's 8th congressional district 2024 Republican primary results
Party	Candidate	Votes	%
Republican	Rob Bresnahan	42,365	100.0
Total votes		42,365	100.0

2024 Pennsylvania's 8th congressional district
Party	Candidate	Votes	%
Republican	Rob Bresnahan	195,663	50.8
Democratic	Matt Cartwright (incumbent)	189,411	49.2
Total votes		385,074	100.0
Republican gain from Democratic			

Pennsylvania's 8th congressional district 2026 Republican primary results
Party	Candidate	Votes	%
Republican	Rob Bresnahan (incumbent)	38,075	100.0
Total votes		38,075	100.0

2026 Pennsylvania's 8th congressional district election
Party	Candidate	Votes	%	±%
Democratic	Paige Cognetti	154,052	54.5	+5.3
Republican	Rob Bresnahan (incumbent)	128,737	45.5	−5.3
Total votes		282,732	100.0	
Democratic gain from Republican				

U.S. House of Representatives
Preceded by Matt Cartwright	Member of the U.S. House of Representatives from Pennsylvania's 8th congressional district 2025–present	Incumbent
U.S. order of precedence (ceremonial)
Preceded by Sheri Biggs	United States representatives by seniority 370th	Succeeded by Janelle Bynum
