= United States House Transportation Subcommittee on Highways and Transit =

Subcommittee of Committee on Transportation and Infrastructure
- Active United States House of Representatives; 119th Congress

Leadership
- Chair: David Rouzer (R)
- Ranking Member: Eleanor Holmes Norton (D)

Structure
- Seats: 53 (50 currently filled) 25/28 25/25
- Political parties: Majority (25): Republican (25); Minority (25): Democratic (25)

Meeting place
- 2165, Rayburn House Office Building; Washington, D.C. 20515

Phone number
- (202)-225-9446

The House Transportation Subcommittee on Highways and Transit is a subcommittee within the House Transportation and Infrastructure Committee.

== Jurisdiction ==
The subcommittee oversees highway, transit, and highway safety programs in the United States, and policies governing how highway and transit projects are planned, approved, and constructed. Agencies within its jurisdiction are the Federal Highway Administration, the Federal Transit Administration, and the Federal Motor Carrier Safety Administration. It also oversees portions of the Clean Air Act related to vehicle fuel economy, including Corporate Average Fuel Economy standards set by the National Highway Traffic Safety Administration.

== Members, 119th Congress ==
Majority	Minority
David Rouzer, North Carolina, Chair; Rick Crawford, Arkansas; Daniel Webster, Florida; Thomas Massie, Kentucky; Mike Bost, Illinois; Doug LaMalfa, California; Bruce Westerman, Arkansas; Pete Stauber, Minnesota; Tim Burchett, Tennessee; Dusty Johnson, South Dakota; Jeff Van Drew, New Jersey; Troy Nehls, Texas; Burgess Owens, Utah; Eric Burlison, Missouri; Mike Collins, Georgia; Kevin Kiley, California (until March 18, 2026); Vince Fong, California; Tony Wied, Wisconsin; Tom Barrett, Michigan; Rob Bresnahan, Pennsylvania, Vice Chair; Jeff Hurd, Colorado; Jefferson Shreve, Indiana; Addison McDowell, North Carolina; David Taylor, Ohio; Brad Knott, North Carolina; Kimberlyn King-Hinds, Northern Mariana Islands; Mike Kennedy, Utah	Eleanor Holmes Norton, District of Columbia, Ranking Member; John Garamendi, California; Hank Johnson, Georgia; Jared Huffman, California; Julia Brownley, California; Mark DeSaulnier, California; Chuy García, Illinois; Chris Pappas, New Hampshire; Marilyn Strickland, Washington; Pat Ryan, New York; Val Hoyle, Oregon; Emilia Sykes, Ohio; Jerry Nadler, New York; Nellie Pou, New Jersey; Kristen McDonald Rivet, Michigan; Laura Friedman, California; Laura Gillen, New York; Shomari Figures, Alabama, Vice Ranking Member; Steve Cohen, Tennessee; Dina Titus, Nevada; Salud Carbajal, California; Greg Stanton, Arizona; Sharice Davids, Kansas; Seth Moulton, Massachusetts; Robert Garcia, California
Ex officio
Sam Graves, Missouri	Rick Larsen, Washington

== Historical membership rosters ==
=== 115th Congress ===
Majority	Minority
Sam Graves, Missouri Chairman; Don Young, Alaska; Jimmy Duncan, Tennessee; Frank LoBiondo, New Jersey; Duncan D. Hunter, California; Rick Crawford, Arkansas; Lou Barletta, Pennsylvania; Blake Farenthold, Texas; Bob Gibbs, Ohio; Jeff Denham, California; Thomas Massie, Kentucky; Mark Meadows, North Carolina; Scott Perry, Pennsylvania; Rodney L. Davis, Illinois; Rob Woodall, Georgia; John Katko, New York; Brian Babin, Texas; Garret Graves, Louisiana; Barbara Comstock, Virginia; David Rouzer, North Carolina; Mike Bost, Illinois; Doug LaMalfa, California; Bruce Westerman, Arkansas; Lloyd Smucker, Pennsylvania, Vice Chair; Paul Mitchell, Michigan; John Faso, New York; Drew Ferguson, Georgia	Eleanor Holmes Norton, District of Columbia, Ranking Member; Jerrold Nadler, New York; Steve Cohen, Tennessee; Albio Sires, New Jersey; Rick Nolan, Minnesota; Dina Titus, Nevada; Sean Patrick Maloney, New York; Elizabeth Esty, Connecticut; Jared Huffman, California; Julia Brownley, California; Alan Lowenthal, California; Brenda Lawrence, Michigan; Mark DeSaulnier, California; Eddie Bernice Johnson, Texas; Mike Capuano, Massachusetts; Grace Napolitano, California; Dan Lipinski, Illinois; Hank Johnson, Georgia; Lois Frankel, Florida; Cheri Bustos, Illinois; Frederica Wilson, Florida
Ex officio
Bill Shuster, Pennsylvania	Peter DeFazio, Oregon

=== 116th Congress ===
Majority	Minority
Eleanor Holmes Norton, District of Columbia, Chair; Eddie Bernice Johnson, Texas; Steve Cohen, Tennessee; John Garamendi, California; Hank Johnson, Georgia; Jared Huffman, California; Julia Brownley, California; Frederica Wilson, Florida; Alan Lowenthal, California; Mark DeSaulnier, California; Salud Carbajal, California; Anthony Brown, Maryland; Adriano Espaillat, New York; Tom Malinowski, New Jersey; Greg Stanton, Arizona; Colin Allred, Texas; Sharice Davids, Kansas; Abby Finkenauer, Iowa; Jesús "Chuy" García, Illinois; Antonio Delgado, New York; Chris Pappas, New Hampshire; Angie Craig, Minnesota; Harley Rouda, California; Grace Napolitano, California; Albio Sires, New Jersey; Sean Patrick Maloney, New York; Donald Payne Jr., New Jersey; Dan Lipinski, Illinois; Dina Titus, Nevada; Stacey Plaskett, U.S. Virgin Islands	Rodney Davis, Illinois, Ranking Member; Don Young, Alaska; Rick Crawford, Arkansas; Bob Gibbs, Ohio; Daniel Webster, Florida; Thomas Massie, Kentucky; Mark Meadows, North Carolina; Rob Woodall, Georgia; John Katko, New York; Brian Babin, Texas; David Rouzer, North Carolina; Mike Bost, Illinois; Doug LaMalfa, California; Bruce Westerman, Arkansas; Lloyd Smucker, Pennsylvania; Paul Mitchell, Michigan; Mike Gallagher, Wisconsin; Gary Palmer, Alabama; Brian Fitzpatrick, Pennsylvania; Troy Balderson, Ohio; Ross Spano, Florida; Pete Stauber, Minnesota; Carol Miller, West Virginia; Greg Pence, Indiana
Ex officio
Peter DeFazio, Oregon	Sam Graves, Missouri

=== 117th Congress ===
Majority	Minority
Eleanor Holmes Norton, District of Columbia, Chair; Eddie Bernice Johnson, Texas; Albio Sires, New Jersey; John Garamendi, California; Hank Johnson, Georgia; Sean Patrick Maloney, New York; Julia Brownley, California; Frederica Wilson, Florida; Alan Lowenthal, California; Mark DeSaulnier, California; Stephen Lynch, Massachusetts; Anthony Brown, Maryland; Greg Stanton, Arizona, Vice Chair; Colin Allred, Texas; Jesús "Chuy" García, Illinois; Antonio Delgado, New York; Chris Pappas, New Hampshire; Conor Lamb, Pennsylvania; Jake Auchincloss, Massachusetts; Carolyn Bourdeaux, Georgia; Marilyn Strickland, Washington; Grace Napolitano, California; Jared Huffman, California; Salud Carbajal, California; Sharice Davids, Kansas; Seth Moulton, Massachusetts; Kai Kahele, Hawaii; Nikema Williams, Georgia; Marie Newman, Illinois; Steve Cohen, Tennessee	Rodney Davis, Illinois, Ranking Member; Don Young, Alaska (until March 18, 2022); Rick Crawford, Arkansas; Bob Gibbs, Ohio; Thomas Massie, Kentucky; Scott Perry, Pennsylvania; John Katko, New York; Brian Babin, Texas; David Rouzer, North Carolina; Mike Bost, Illinois; Doug LaMalfa, California; Bruce Westerman, Arkansas; Mike Gallagher, Wisconsin; Brian Fitzpatrick, Pennsylvania; Jenniffer González, Puerto Rico; Troy Balderson, Ohio; Pete Stauber, Minnesota; Tim Burchett, Tennessee; Dusty Johnson, South Dakota; Michael Guest, Mississippi; Troy Nehls, Texas; Nancy Mace, South Carolina; Nicole Malliotakis, New York; Beth Van Duyne, Texas; Carlos A. Giménez, Florida; Michelle Steel, California
Ex officio
Peter DeFazio, Oregon	Sam Graves, Missouri

=== 118th Congress ===
Majority	Minority
Rick Crawford, Arkansas, Chair; Daniel Webster, Florida; Thomas Massie, Kentucky; Mike Bost, Illinois; Doug LaMalfa, California; Pete Stauber, Minnesota; Tim Burchett, Tennessee; Dusty Johnson, South Dakota; Jeff Van Drew, New Jersey; Troy Nehls, Texas; Tracey Mann, Kansas; Burgess Owens, Utah; Rudy Yakym, Indiana; Lori Chavez-DeRemer, Oregon; Eric Burlison, Missouri; Derrick Van Orden, Wisconsin; Brandon Williams, New York; Marc Molinaro, New York; Mike Collins, Georgia; John Duarte, California, Vice Chair; Aaron Bean, Florida; Celeste Maloy, Utah (from December 6, 2023)	Eleanor Holmes Norton, District of Columbia, Ranking Member; Jared Huffman, California; Chris Pappas, New Hampshire; Marilyn Strickland, Washington; Pat Ryan, New York; Rob Menendez, New Jersey; Val Hoyle, Oregon; Valerie Foushee, North Carolina; Grace Napolitano, California; Steve Cohen, Tennessee; Hank Johnson, Georgia; Julia Brownley, California; Greg Stanton, Arizona; Colin Allred, Texas; Chuy García, Illinois; Seth Moulton, Massachusetts; Emilia Sykes, Ohio; John Garamendi, California; Dina Titus, Nevada; Salud Carbajal, California; Jake Auchincloss, Massachusetts; Mark DeSaulnier, California
Ex officio
Sam Graves, Missouri	Rick Larsen, Washington
