= Abby Finkenauer =

American politician (born 1988)

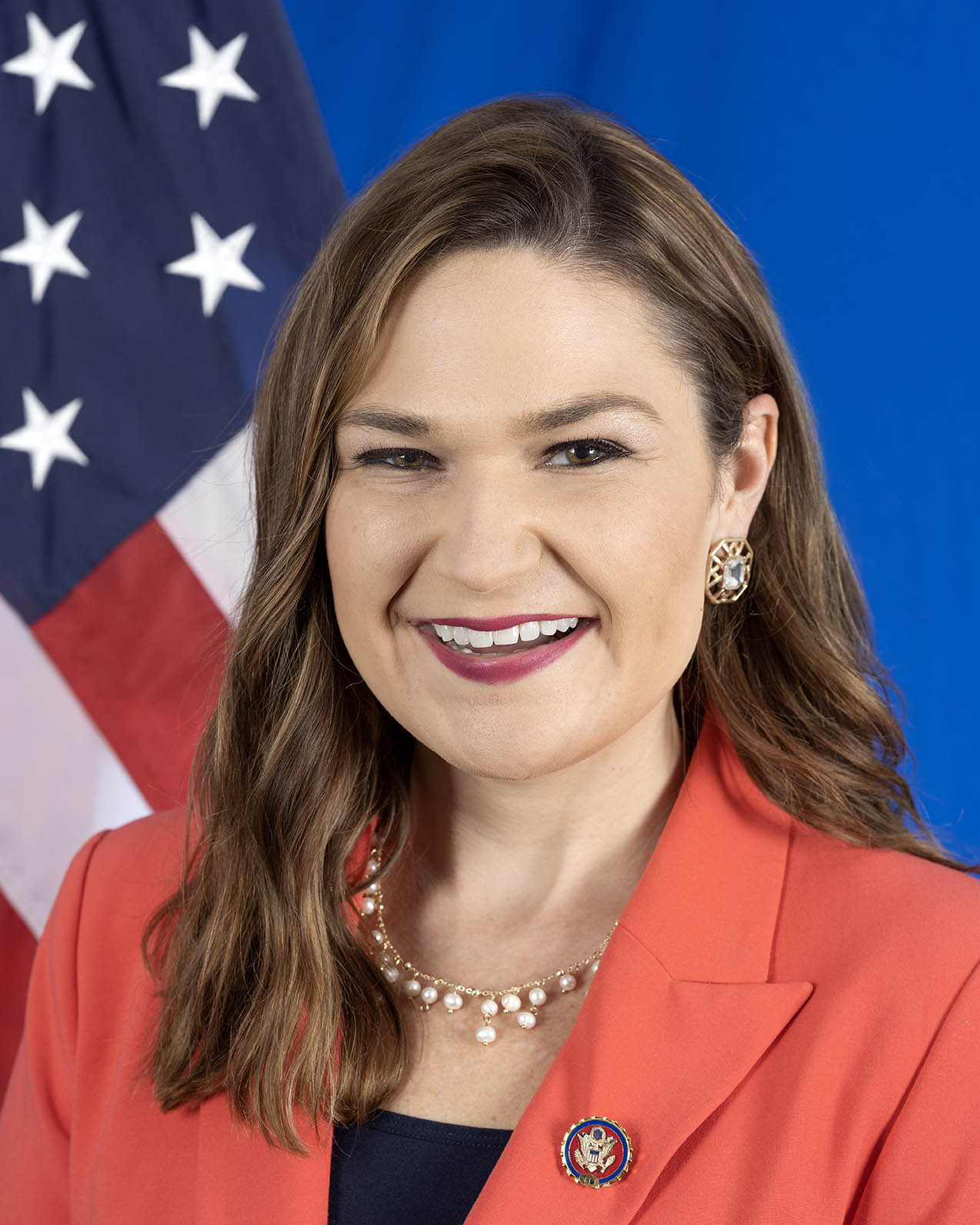
- Official portrait, 2023

United States Special Envoy for Global Youth Issues
- In office December 1, 2022 – January 20, 2025
- President: Joe Biden
- Preceded by: Andy Rabens
- Succeeded by: Position abolished

Member of the U.S. House of Representatives from Iowa's 1st district
- In office January 3, 2019 – January 3, 2021
- Preceded by: Rod Blum
- Succeeded by: Ashley Hinson

Member of the Iowa House of Representatives from the 99th district
- In office January 12, 2015 – January 3, 2019
- Preceded by: Pat Murphy
- Succeeded by: Lindsay James

Personal details
- Born: Abby Lea Finkenauer; December 27, 1988 (age 37) Dubuque, Iowa, U.S.
- Party: Democratic
- Spouse: Daniel Wasta (m. 2020)
- Education: Drake University (BA)

Abby Lea Finkenauer (born December 27, 1988) is an American politician who served as the United States Special Envoy for Global Youth Issues within the U.S. Department of State from 2022 to 2025. Finkenauer previously served as the U.S. representative from Iowa's 1st congressional district from 2019 to 2021. She is a member of the Democratic Party.

Before being elected to Congress, Finkenauer served in the Iowa House of Representatives for the 99th district from 2015 to 2019. On November 6, 2018, Finkenauer and fellow Democrat Cindy Axne became the first women from Iowa elected to the U.S. House of Representatives. Finkenauer also became the second-youngest woman to ever be elected to the U.S. House. She lost reelection in 2020 and lost a primary election for the United States Senate in 2022.

== Early life and education ==
Finkenauer was born in Dubuque, Iowa, and grew up in nearby Sherrill, Iowa.

She graduated from Hempstead High School in Dubuque. In 2011, Finkenauer graduated from Drake University in Des Moines, Iowa, with a bachelor's degree in public relations.

== Career ==
In 2006, Finkenauer was a page for U.S. Representative Jim Nussle, a Republican who represented Northeast Iowa in Congress. The following year, after Nussle ran unsuccessfully for Governor of Iowa, Finkenauer was a page for Patrick Murphy, the Democratic Speaker of the Iowa State House of Representatives.

In 2007, Finkenauer was the Iowa volunteer coordinator for the Joe Biden presidential campaign. She was later legislative aide for Democratic state Representative Todd Taylor and communications specialist for the Community Foundation of Greater Dubuque.

=== Iowa House of Representatives ===
Finkenauer ran for Murphy's old seat in 2014 and won. In the Democratic primary, Finkenauer defeated defense attorney Steve Drahozal, receiving 57.8% of the vote. In the general election, she faced lawyer Daniel Dlouhy and defeated him, receiving 60.8% of the vote. She was 25 when first elected to the Iowa House of Representatives.

She was unopposed for reelection in 2016.

== U.S. House of Representatives ==
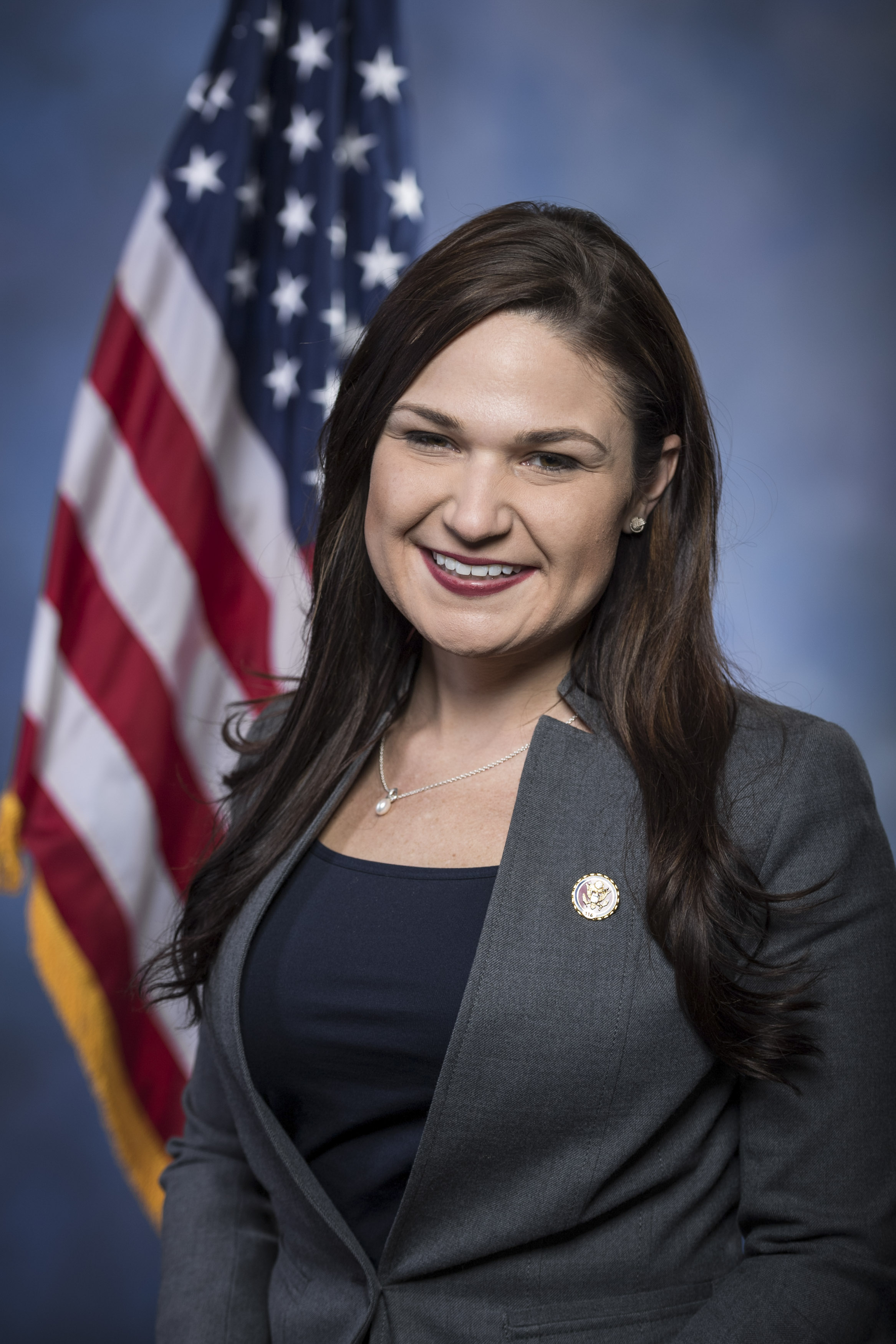
Finkenauer official 2019 Congressional Portrait

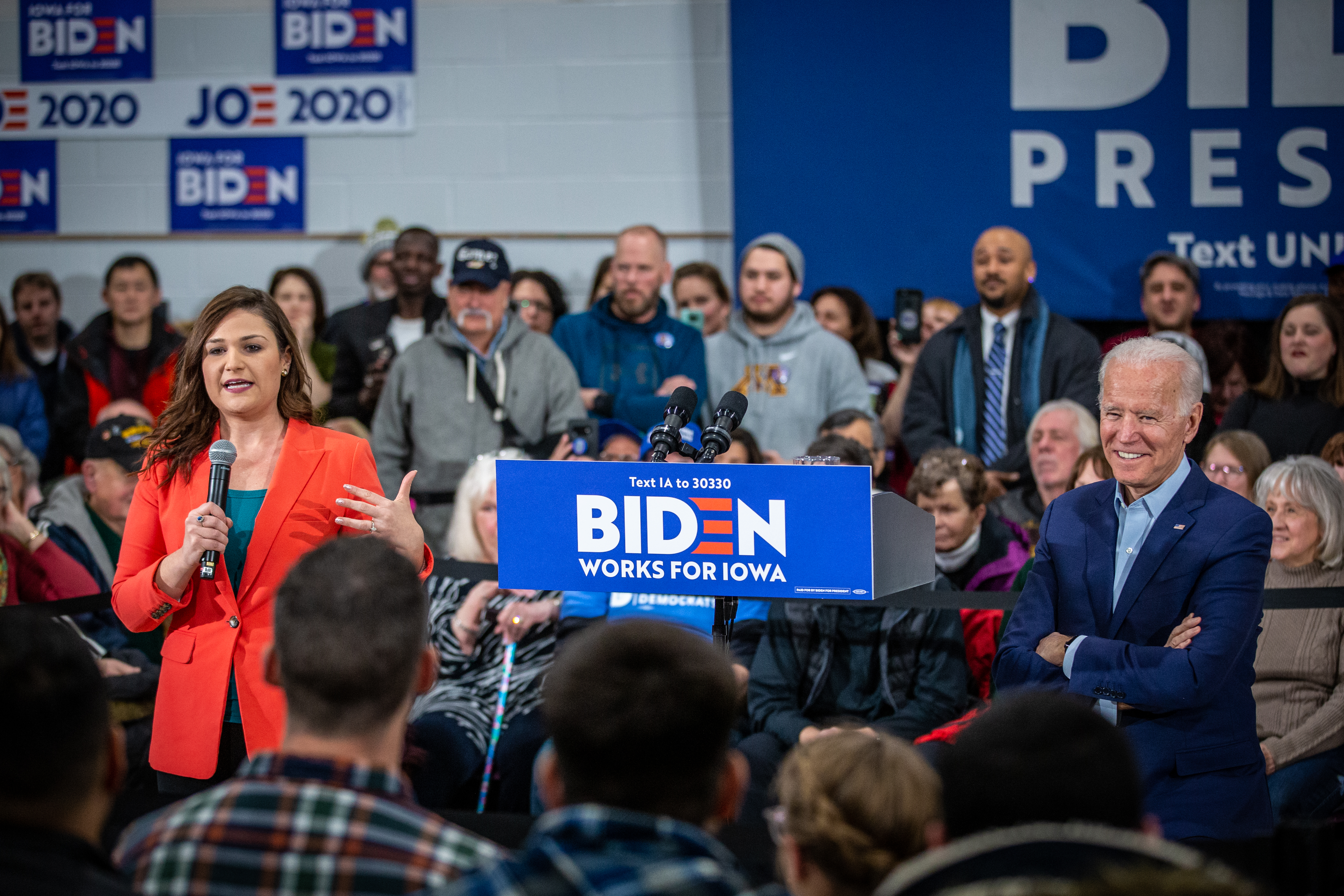
Finkenauer and Joe Biden hold an event with voters in the gymnasium at McKinley Elementary School in Des Moines, January 2020

=== Elections ===
==== 2018 ====
In May 2017, Finkenauer announced her candidacy for Iowa's 1st congressional district, which was held by Republican and Dubuque resident Rod Blum. Blum had unexpectedly defeated her former boss, Murphy, in 2014.

On June 5, 2018, she won the Democratic primary, defeating former congressional staffer Thomas Heckroth, engineer Courtney Rowe and retired military officer George Ramsey. She received 66.9% of the vote.

As of September 2018, her race was classified as Lean Democratic or Tilt Democratic by 3 major rating firms. On October 1, 2018, former President Barack Obama endorsed Finkenauer. She defeated Blum by 16,900 votes.

==== 2020 ====
In 2020, Finkenauer ran again without any Democratic primary opposition. She was defeated in the general election by Republican state Representative Ashley Hinson, by 10,741 votes.

=== Tenure ===
Finkenauer and Cindy Axne, elected in 2018 to represent Iowa's 3rd congressional district, became the first women to represent Iowa in the U.S. House. She is the second youngest woman ever elected to the House, being about ten months older than fellow 2018 freshman Alexandria Ocasio-Cortez; Finkenauer turned 30 a week before being sworn in on January 3, 2019. Finkenauer also served in House Leadership as an assistant whip during the 116th United States Congress.

=== Committee assignments ===
- Committee on Small Business
  - Subcommittee on Innovation and Workforce Development
  - Subcommittee on Rural Development, Agriculture, Trade, and Entrepreneurship (Chair)
- Committee on Transportation and Infrastructure
  - Subcommittee on Highways and Transit (Vice Chair)
  - Subcommittee on Water Resources and Environment

=== Caucus memberships ===
- Congressional Caucus for Women's Issues
- Future Forum Caucus (Vice Chair)
- Congressional Endometriosis Caucus (Co-Chair)

== Post-congressional career ==
=== 2022 U.S. Senate campaign ===
On July 22, 2021, Finkenauer announced her candidacy in the Democratic primary for the 2022 U.S. Senate election in Iowa, for the seat held by Chuck Grassley. On April 11, 2022, a judge ruled that she was ineligible for the Democratic primary because her nominating petitions did not have enough verified signatures. Finkenauer said she would appeal the ruling, and four days later on April 15, the Iowa Supreme Court unanimously reversed the decision and allowed Finkenauer to appear on the primary ballot.

Michael Franken, a retired vice admiral in the United States Navy, defeated Finkenauer in the primary election. The Des Moines Register called Franken's victory an upset, as Finkenauer had been the perceived front-runner.

=== Biden administration ===
On November 21, 2022, Finkenauer was appointed the United States Special Envoy for Global Youth Issues. She took office on December 1, 2022, and has completed numerous international visits on behalf of the United States, including to Australia, New Zealand, Qatar, and Thailand. She participated in the Young Southeast Asian Leaders Initiative in Bali from May 1 to 5, 2023.

== Electoral history ==
=== 2014 ===
Iowa House of Representatives 99th district election, 2014
| Party | Candidate | Votes | % |
|---|---|---|---|
| Democratic | Abby Finkenauer | 7,072 | 60.6% |
| Republican | Daniel Dlouhy | 4,567 | 39.2% |
| Nonpartisan | Write-ins | 23 | 0.2% |
| Total votes | | 11,662 | 100% |
| Democratic hold | | | |

=== 2018 ===
Democratic primary election of Iowa's 1st congressional district, 2018
| Party | Candidate | Votes | % |
|---|---|---|---|
| Democratic | Abby Finkenauer | 29,525 | 66.90% |
| Democratic | Thomas Heckroth | 8,467 | 19.18% |
| Democratic | Courtney Rowe | 3,320 | 7.52% |
| Democratic | George Ramsey | 2,786 | 6.31% |
| Democratic | Write-ins | 36 | 0.08% |
| Total votes | | 44,134 | 100% |

U.S. House election, 2018: Iowa District 1
| Party | Candidate | Votes | % | ±% |
|---|---|---|---|---|
| Democratic | Abby Finkenauer | 169,496 | 50.9 | +4.8 |
| Republican | Rod Blum (incumbent) | 153,077 | 45.6 | −7.7 |
| Libertarian | Troy Hageman | 10,239 | 3.1 | +3.1 |
| Write-ins | | 171 | 0.05 | −0.15 |
| Majority | | 16,419 | 5.3 | |
| Turnout | | 332,983 | 100 | |
| Democratic gain from Republican | | Swing | +12.5 | |

=== 2020 ===
Democratic primary election of Iowa's 1st congressional district, 2020
| Party | Candidate | Votes | % |
|---|---|---|---|
| Democratic | Abby Finkenauer (incumbent) | 72,474 | 99.3% |
| Nonpartisan | Write-ins | 482 | 0.7% |
| Total votes | | 72,956 | 100% |

2020 Election for U.S. Representative of Iowa's 1st Congressional District
| Party | Candidate | Votes | % |
|---|---|---|---|
| Republican | Ashley Hinson | 212,088 | 51.2 |
| Democratic | Abby Finkenauer (incumbent) | 201,347 | 48.7 |
| Republican gain from Democratic | | Swing | 7.6 |

== Personal life ==
Finkenauer married Daniel Wasta, the Iowa Political Director for the Elizabeth Warren 2020 presidential campaign, on August 8, 2020.

Finkenauer has discussed her experiences with endometriosis and worked to pass an amendment that doubled federal research funding focused on endometriosis. She founded the Congressional Endometriosis Caucus.

Finkenauer is Roman Catholic.

== See also ==
- Women in the United States House of Representatives

U.S. House of Representatives
| Preceded by Rod Blum | Member of the U.S. House of Representatives from Iowa's 1st congressional district 2019–2021 | Succeeded by Ashley Hinson |
Diplomatic posts
| Preceded by Andy Rabens | United States Special Envoy for Global Youth Issues; 2022–2025 | Vacant |
U.S. order of precedence (ceremonial)
| Preceded by Pete Gallego as Former U.S. Representative | Order of precedence of the United States as Former U.S. Representative | Succeeded by Harold V. Froehlich as Former U.S. Representative |
