= Carolyn Bourdeaux =

American politician & educator (born 1970)

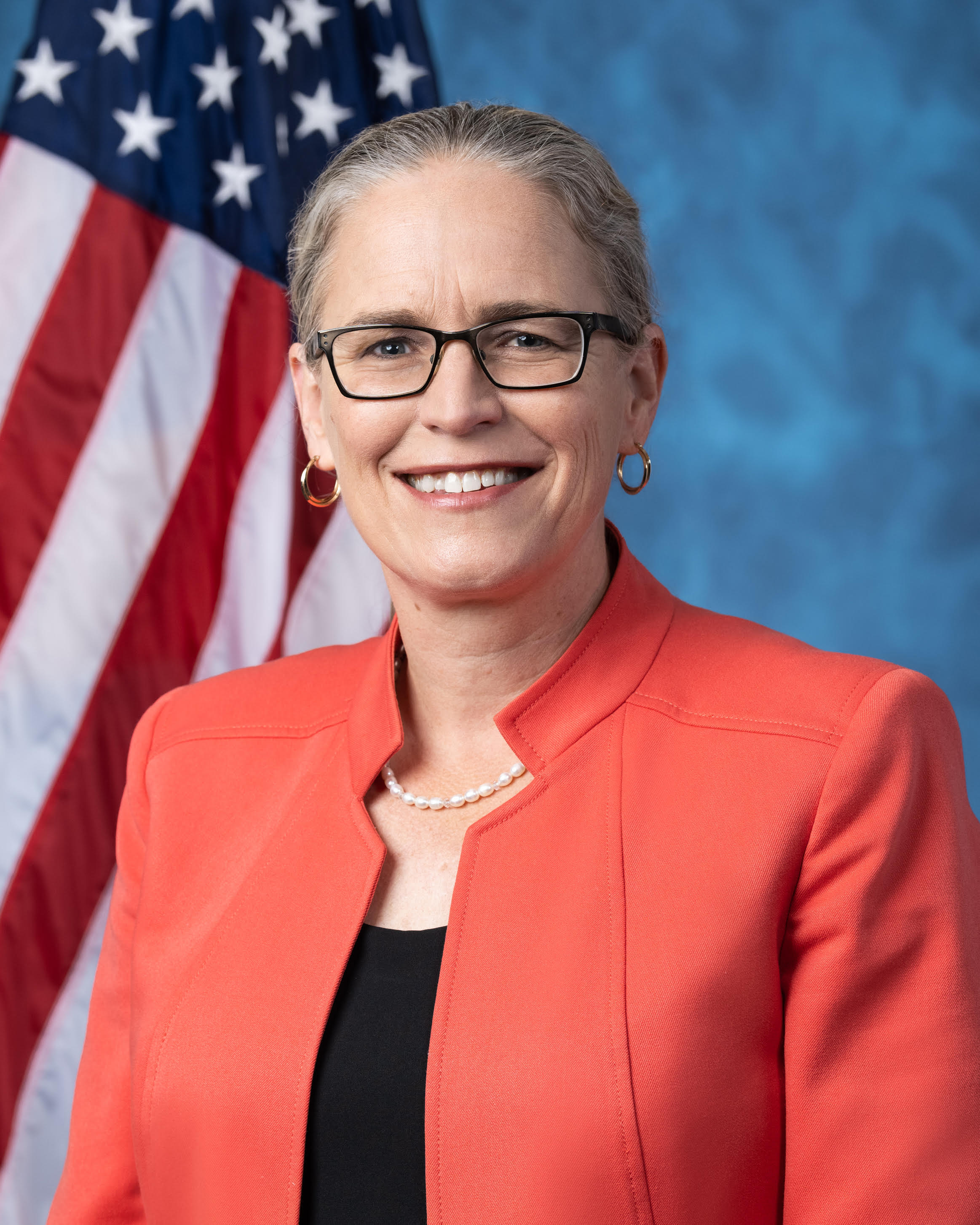
- Official portrait, 2021

Member of the U.S. House of Representatives from Georgia's 7th district
- In office January 3, 2021 – January 3, 2023
- Preceded by: Rob Woodall
- Succeeded by: Lucy McBath (redistricted)

Personal details
- Born: June 3, 1970 (age 56) Roanoke, Virginia, U.S.
- Party: Democratic
- Spouse: Jeffrey Skodnick
- Children: 1
- Education: Yale University (BA); University of Southern California (MPA); Syracuse University (DPA)

Carolyn Jordan Bourdeaux (born June 3, 1970) is an American politician and educator who served as the U.S. representative from Georgia's 7th congressional district from 2021 to 2023. A member of the Democratic Party, she was a professor at the Andrew Young School of Public Policy at Georgia State University from 2003 to 2021 and Director of the Georgia State Senate Budget and Evaluation Office from 2007 to 2010.

In 2018, Bourdeaux ran for Georgia's 7th congressional district, coming within 433 votes of defeating the incumbent Republican, Rob Woodall, in the closest congressional race in that cycle. On February 7, 2019, Woodall announced he would retire at the end of his current term. That same day, Bourdeaux announced her intention to once again seek the seat. She won the 2020 election, defeating Republican Rich McCormick.

On May 24, 2022, Bordeaux lost a redistricting race to fellow incumbent Lucy McBath in Georgia's 7th congressional district. In March 2025, the fiscally conservative nonpartisan advocacy group Concord Coalition announced Bordeaux as its new executive director.

== Early life and education ==
Bourdeaux is from Roanoke, Virginia and is the daughter of Robert "Bob" Montgomery Bourdeaux IV and Jerry Jordan (née Ellis) Bourdeaux. In Roanoke, she attended Northside High School. Bourdeaux graduated from Yale University with a bachelor's degree in history and economics. She earned a Master of Public Administration from the University of Southern California and a Doctor of Public Administration from the Maxwell School of Citizenship and Public Affairs at Syracuse University in 2003.

== Early career ==
Bourdeaux worked as a political aide to Ron Wyden for four years, when he served in the United States House of Representatives and then in the United States Senate. In 2003, she became an assistant professor at Georgia State University. From 2007 to 2010, she served as director of Georgia's Senate Budget and Evaluation Office. After her time there, she returned to the Andrew Young School and founded the Center for State and Local Finance.

In 2021, Bourdeaux was selected to become a fellow of the National Academy of Public Administration.

== U.S. House of Representatives ==
=== Elections ===
==== 2018 ====
In 2018, Bourdeaux ran for the United States House of Representatives in Georgia's 7th congressional district. The district was based in Gwinnett County, a suburban county northeast of Atlanta. She faced a six-way primary for the Democratic nomination. She came in first place in the May primary and earned a spot in the July 24 runoff. She won the runoff and the Democratic nomination. She faced Republican Rob Woodall in the November 6 general election. Bourdeaux was endorsed by Barack Obama.

The race was considered a sleeper, but it received more attention later in the campaign as Bourdeaux continued to outraise Woodall and as Democrats picked up momentum nationwide. In the third quarter of 2018, Bourdeaux outraised Woodall by a margin of more than 3-1, raising over $1 million. On election night, the race was too close to call. Just a few hours after it was filed on November 15, U.S. District Judge Leigh Martin May denied an emergency motion to force Gwinnett County to count previously rejected absentee ballots in the race. On November 21, after a recount, Bourdeaux conceded.

==== 2020 ====
Bourdeaux sheltering in her congressional office during the January 6 United States Capitol attack.

On February 7, 2019, Bourdeaux announced that she would run for the same seat in 2020. She was endorsed by a number of Georgia politicians, including Congressman John Lewis. In the first week of her campaign, she announced raising over $100,000. In the first quarter of 2019, she outraised all other congressional challengers in the country, with a total of over $350,000, but she still attracted challenges from local activists and community leaders in the Democratic primary. Bourdeaux won the primary, narrowly avoiding a runoff with 52.7% of the vote.

Woodall did not seek reelection in 2020. Bourdeaux narrowly defeated Republican physician Rich McCormick in the general election. Aside from Deborah Ross and Kathy Manning in North Carolina, who won seats that were redrawn to become safely Democratic, Bourdeaux was the only Democratic House candidate in 2020 to flip a seat previously held by a Republican.

==== 2022 ====
The Republican-controlled Georgia General Assembly significantly redrew the districts in the Atlanta suburbs after the 2020 Census. Bourdeaux's district was pushed to the west, losing its share of Forsyth County while picking up parts of Fulton County that had previously been in the neighboring 6th district, represented by Lucy McBath. At the same time, the 6th absorbed a large swath of Republican-leaning exurban territory previously in the 9th district.

Believing that the new map made her district impossible to hold, McBath challenged Bourdeaux in the Democratic primary for the redrawn 7th district and won by a landslide.

=== Tenure ===
Bourdeaux was sworn in on January 3, 2021. She is the first Democrat to represent this district since its creation in 1993 as the 4th district; it became the 11th in 1997 and has been the 7th since 2003. John Linder held the seat from its creation until handing it to Woodall, his former chief of staff, in 2011. Bourdeaux is the only Democrat since 1994 to win as much as 40% of the vote in the district. She is also the first white Democrat to represent a district based in the Atlanta suburbs since Buddy Darden left office in 1995.

On August 12, 2021, Bourdeaux and eight other House Democrats signed a letter to Speaker Nancy Pelosi saying, "We will not consider voting for a budget resolution until the bipartisan Infrastructure Investment and Jobs Act passes the House and is signed into law." She said her support for the Democrats' $3.5 trillion budget resolution would be withheld if the timeline did not change for passage of the budget. Bourdeaux ultimately voted for the $3.5 trillion budget.

As of August 2021, Bourdeaux had voted in line with President Joe Biden's stated position 100% of the time.

=== Committee assignments ===
- Committee on Small Business
  - Subcommittee on Economic Growth, Tax and Capital Access
- Committee on Transportation and Infrastructure
  - Subcommittee on Highways and Transit
  - Subcommittee on Water Resources and Environment

=== Caucus memberships ===
- Blue Dog Coalition
- New Democrat Coalition
- Problem Solvers Caucus (former member)

== Personal life ==
Bourdeaux is married to Jeffrey Skodnik, a sales manager at LexisNexis. They live in Suwanee, Georgia, and have a son. Her sister Margaret Bourdeaux is a researcher at Harvard University and is married to astronomer David Charbonneau.

== See also ==
- Women in the United States House of Representatives

U.S. House of Representatives
Preceded by Rob Woodall	Member of the U.S. House of Representatives from Georgia's 7th congressional district 2021–2023	Succeeded by Lucy McBath
U.S. order of precedence (ceremonial)
Preceded by Karen Handel as Former U.S. Representative	Order of precedence of the United States as Former U.S. Representative	Succeeded by Frank Kratovil as Former U.S. Representative
