= Mark Alford =

American politician (born 1963)

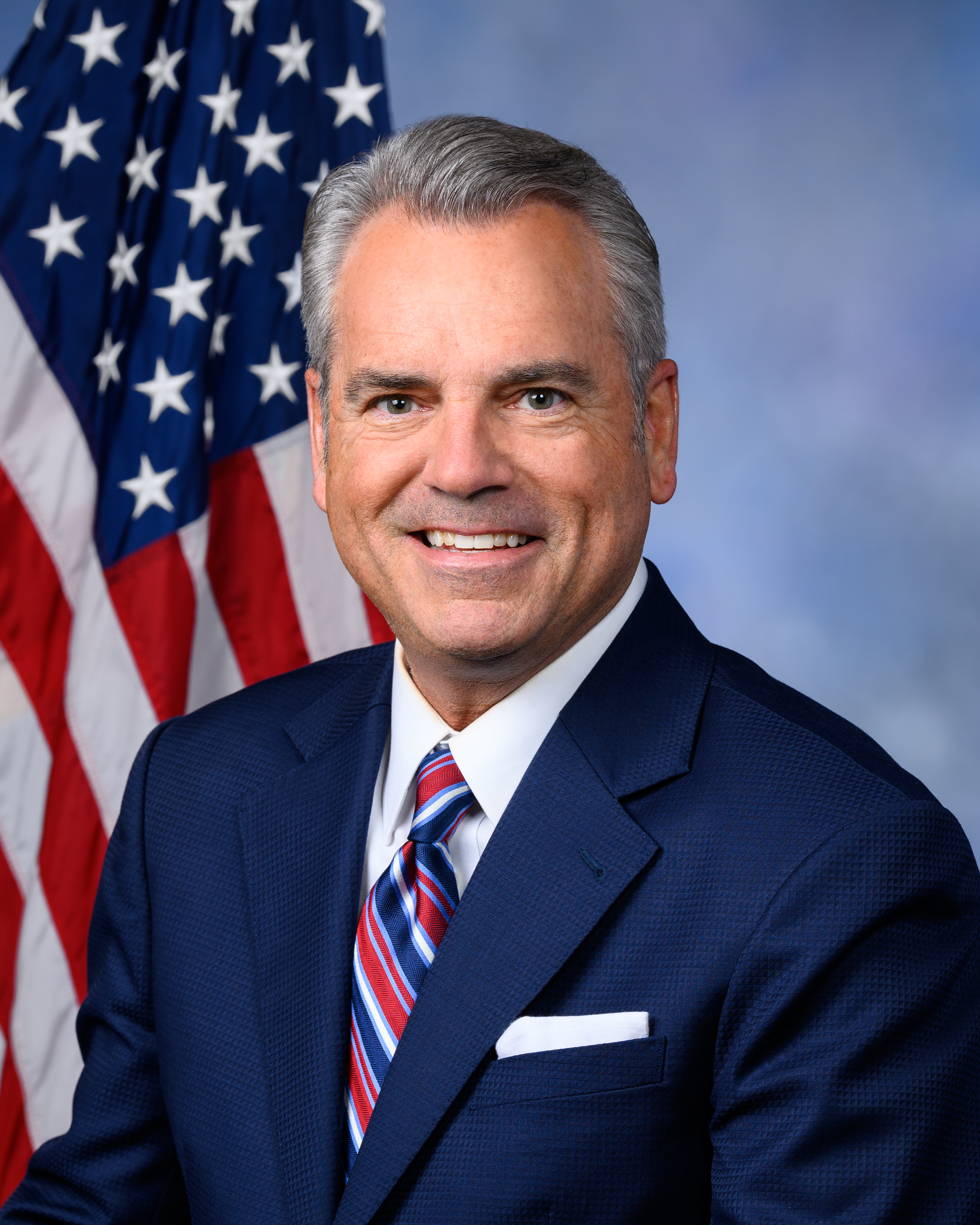
- Official portrait, 2022

Secretary-elect of the House Republican Conference
- Assuming office January 3, 2027
- Leader: Jim Jordan (elect)
- Succeeding: Erin Houchin

Member of the U.S. House of Representatives from Missouri's 4th district
- Incumbent
- Assumed office January 3, 2023
- Preceded by: Vicky Hartzler

Personal details
- Born: Mark Allen Alford Sr. October 4, 1963 (age 63) Baytown, Texas, U.S.
- Party: Republican
- Spouse: Leslie Adkins (m. 1989)
- Children: 3
- Education: Lee College (attended); Texas State University (attended); University of Texas, Austin (attended)
- Website: House website Campaign website

Mark Allen Alford Sr. (born October 4, 1963) is an American politician and former television news anchor serving as the U.S. representative for Missouri's 4th congressional district since 2023. He is a member of the Republican Party.

== Early life and career ==
Alford was born in Baytown, Texas. He attended Sterling High School and studied government at the University of Texas at Austin, but left college without graduating.

Alford worked for KPRC-TV in Houston as a reporter and weekend anchor for News 2 Houston from 1995 and 1998. Before that, he was anchor for KDFW-TV in Dallas and a reporter with WPTV-TV in West Palm Beach; KWTX-TV in Waco; and KXAN-TV in Austin. In 1998, he went to WDAF-TV in Kansas City as an anchor for Fox 4 News and stayed there for 23 years. He announced his resignation on October 8, 2021.

== U.S. House of Representatives ==
=== Elections ===
On October 27, 2021, Alford announced his candidacy for the United States House of Representatives in Missouri's 4th congressional district as a Republican in the 2022 elections. He won the Republican nomination in the August 2 primary election and won the November 8 general election.

=== Tenure ===
Alford was among the 71 Republicans who voted against final passage of the Fiscal Responsibility Act of 2023 in the House.

He voted to provide Israel with support following the 2023 Hamas-led attack on Israel.

Alford supported the 2025 United States federal mass layoffs, telling fired federal employees at an event in Belton, Missouri that "God has a plan and purpose for your life."

Alford supported proposed tariffs on Canadian trade, arguing that he and American consumers are willing to accept higher costs to "get America right again."

Alford opposed the discharge petition for the Epstein files, however said he would approve the measure if it advances to a vote.

In February 2026, Alford called for a formal investigation into Bad Bunny for his Super Bowl halftime performance.

=== Committee assignments ===
For the 119th Congress:

- Committee on Appropriations
  - Subcommittee on Commerce, Justice, Science, and Related Agencies
  - Subcommittee on Financial Services and General Government
  - Subcommittee on Military Construction, Veterans Affairs, and Related Agencies (Vice Chair)
  - Subcommittee on National Security, Department of State, and Related Programs
- Committee on Small Business
  - Subcommittee on Oversight, Investigations, and Regulations (Chairman)

=== Caucus memberships ===
- Congressional Western Caucus
- BIOTech Caucus

== Personal life ==
Alford and his wife, Leslie, have three children, Mark Allen Alford Jr., Alexandria Naomi Francis, and Spencer "Jasper" Adkins Alford. They live in Lake Winnebago, a suburb of Kansas City. Alford is a member of Evangel Church, an Assemblies of God megachurch in Kansas City.

U.S. House of Representatives
Preceded by Vicky Hartzler	Member of the U.S. House of Representatives from Missouri's 4th congressional district 2023–present	Incumbent
U.S. order of precedence (ceremonial)
Preceded by Cleo Fields	United States representatives by seniority 291st	Succeeded by Becca Balint
