= Rod Blum =

American politician (born 1955)

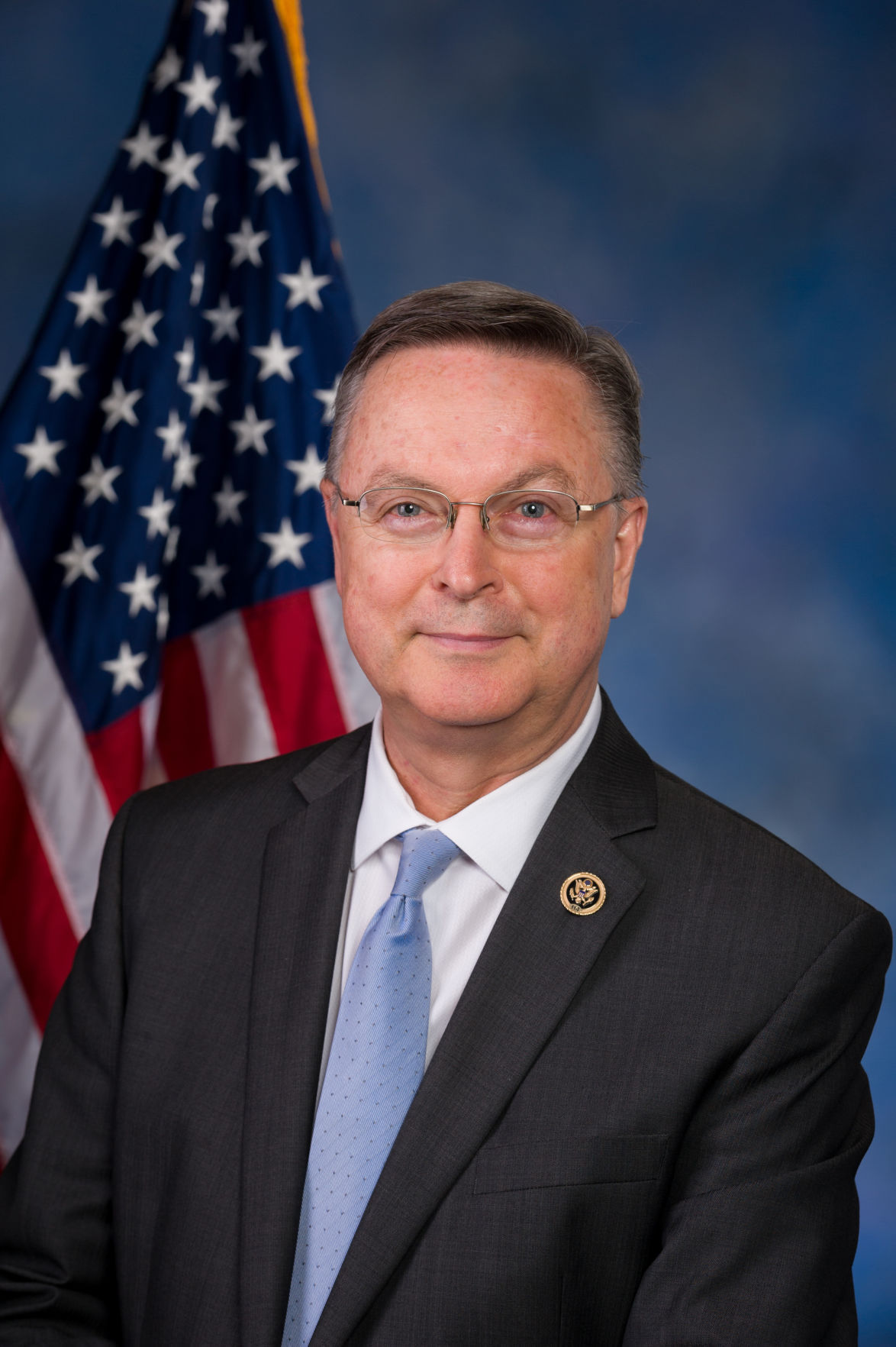
- Official portrait, 2015

Member of the U.S. House of Representatives from Iowa's 1st district
- In office January 3, 2015 – January 3, 2019
- Preceded by: Bruce Braley
- Succeeded by: Abby Finkenauer

Personal details
- Born: Rodney Leland Blum; April 26, 1955 (age 71) Dubuque, Iowa, U.S.
- Party: Republican
- Spouse: Karen Blum
- Children: 5
- Education: Loras College (BA); University of Dubuque (MBA)

Rodney Leland Blum (/ˈblʌm/; born April 26, 1955) is an American businessman and politician who served as the U.S. representative for Iowa's 1st congressional district from 2015 to 2019.

A member of the Republican Party, Blum has described himself as a member of the Tea Party movement. He was first elected in 2014, succeeding Bruce Braley, who ran unsuccessfully for the Senate that same year. He then won a second term in 2016. In 2018, he lost reelection to Democrat Abby Finkenauer.

Blum briefly ran in the 2026 election for Iowa's 2nd congressional district, but ultimately withdrew from the race.

== Career ==
Blum attended Loras College, where he earned a degree in finance, and the University of Dubuque, where he earned a master's degree in business administration.

Blum is the former CEO of Eagle Point Software (1990–2000). He has owned Digital Canal, a software company, since 2000. Blum served as Chair of the Dubuque County Republican Party from 1995 to 1997.

== U.S. House of Representatives ==
=== Elections ===
==== 2014 ====
After winning the Republican primary in June 2014, Blum defeated Democratic state representative Pat Murphy with 51% of the vote in the November 4, 2014, general election. This was considered a surprise Republican victory, as the seat had a D+5 Cook PVI Score. Blum succeeded Democrat Bruce Braley, who vacated his U.S. House seat to run unsuccessfully for the U.S. Senate.

==== 2016 ====
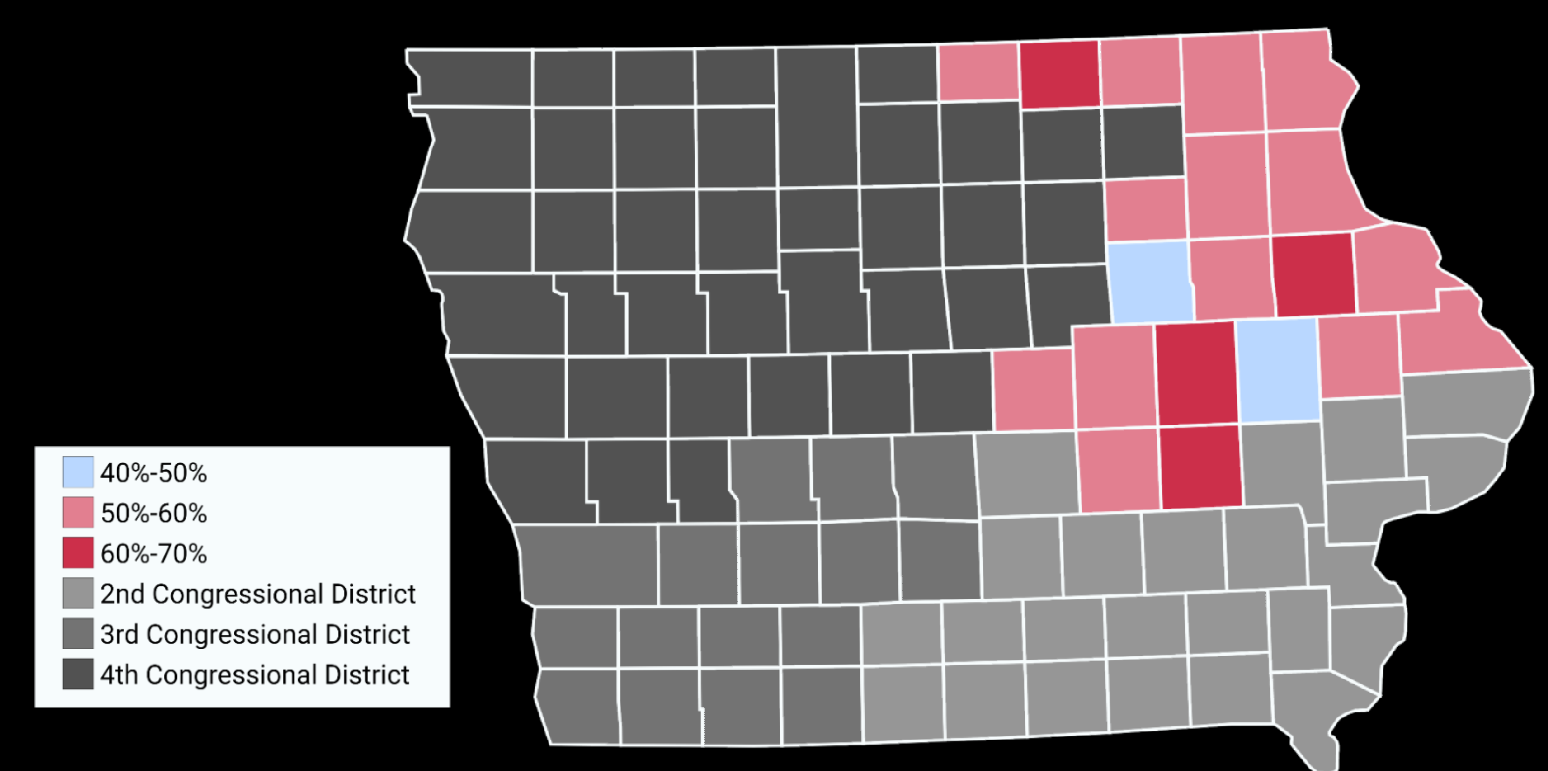
Map showing the results of the 2016 election in Iowa's First congressional district by county

Blum ran for reelection in 2016. He was unopposed in the Republican primary. He faced Democrat Monica Vernon in the general election. Blum defeated Vernon with 54% of the vote.

==== 2018 ====
Blum was defeated in 2018 by state representative Abby Finkenauer by 16,900 votes.

==== 2026 ====
Blum briefly ran in the 2026 election for Iowa's 2nd congressional district, but ultimately withdrew from the race.

=== Committee assignments ===
- Committee on Small Business
  - Subcommittee on Agriculture, Energy and Trade (chair)
- Committee on Oversight and Government Reform
  - Subcommittee on Information Technology

=== Caucus memberships ===
- Congressional Slovak Caucus
- Congressional Term Limits Caucus
- Freedom Caucus
- Republican Study Committee

== Political positions ==
Blum describes himself as a "Tea Party Republican," and has said that "the Tea Party is what the Republican Party should have always been."

As of October 2017, Blum had voted with the Republican Party in 90% of votes in the 115th United States Congress and voted in line with President Trump's position in 94% of the votes.

=== Environment ===
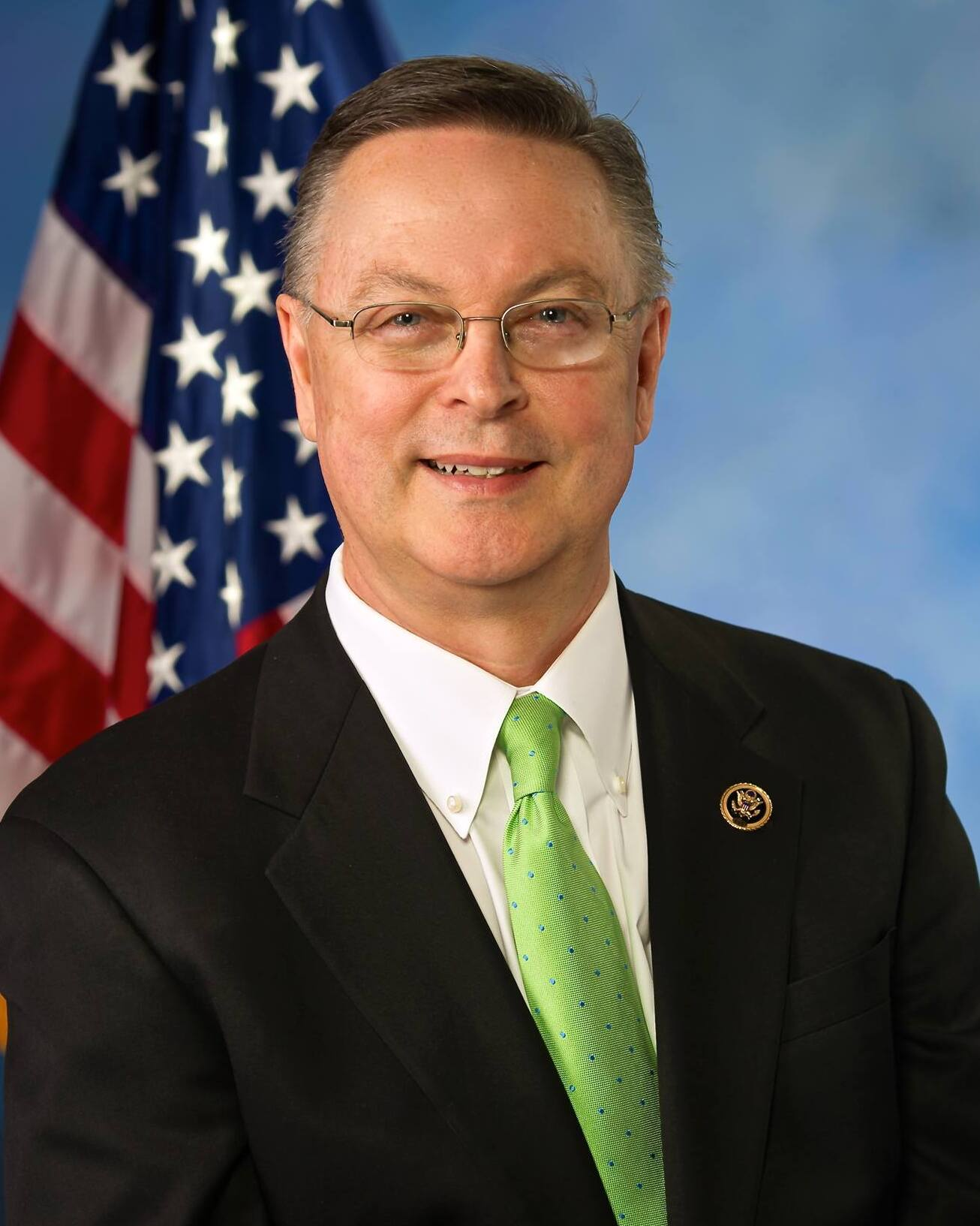
Rod Blum during the 114th Congress

Blum has described himself as "skeptical" of the scientific consensus that human activities are a primary contributor to climate change. He claimed that the scientific community used to support the conjecture of global cooling and that "most scientists' paychecks come from the federal government, and so right away that makes me a bit skeptical." Blum opposes federal regulation of greenhouse gas emissions.

As of February 2017, he had a 3% score with the League of Conservation Voters.

=== Health care ===
Blum favored "fully repealing" the Patient Protection and Affordable Care Act (Obamacare). In 2017, Blum did not support the initial version of the American Health Care Act of 2017, the Republican Party's bill to repeal and replace Obamacare, saying that it "doesn't do enough to lower premiums for hardworking Americans".

On May 4, 2017, Blum voted to repeal the Patient Protection and Affordable Care Act and pass the revised version of the American Health Care Act. Blum said that the bill had been improved to his liking. He described the bill as "Trumpcare" but also as "Obamacare 2.0" because "We've probably changed 10, 20 percent of the bill is all." Blum said that "AHCA will stabilize the market, lower premiums for Iowans, increase choices, reduce taxes, and protect people who have pre-existing conditions."

Asked why he voted for the legislation before the impact of the bill had been assessed by the nonpartisan Congressional Budget Office, Blum stated that there was an urgent need for a fix to Obamacare.

During his town halls in May 2017, Blum falsely claimed that if the current version of AHCA became law that coverage would not change for those on Medicaid. He also told his constituents, "If you're getting your insurance through the group health care marketplace — your employer — nothing changes." This was found to be partly false when fact checked by National Public Radio, as whether someone's insurance would change under the GOP bill depends on whether an employer is based in and purchases its insurance in a state that gets a waiver. Blum also said that AHCA would take care of the same people as the ACA; the Telegraph Herald wrote that under the AHCA, "Insurers still would be prohibited from setting premiums based on health status and denying coverage to someone with a pre-existing condition. However, those who do not maintain continuous coverage could be charged higher premiums for a pre-existing condition" and that states that seek waivers from the federal government would be allowed to charge older individuals up to five times as much as young people and to exempt insurers from a list of essential health benefits mandated by the ACA.

In May 2017, Blum walked out of a local television interview after being asked why his staff was pre-screening constituents who planned to attend his town hall meetings.

=== Economic issues and tax reform ===
Blum favored "a constitutional amendment to balance the budget and limit spending."

In 2015, Blum voted against legislation that would have averted a government shutdown. Discussing the government shutdown, Blum said, "I think the Founding Fathers are smiling right now for the first time in a long time".

In March 2016, in light of a $2 billion redevelopment of D.C.'s Southwest waterfront, Blum said that Washington D.C. "needs a recession."

Blum opposed a mandatory increase in the federal minimum wage.

Blum supported tax reform and voted in favor of the Tax Cuts and Jobs Act of 2017. After the vote passed, Blum tweeted that "families...will see their take home pay increase."

=== Government structure ===
Blum cast his first vote in Congress against John Boehner's speakership, saying, "I was elected by Iowans to stand up to the status quo in Washington, D.C., and I refuse to turn my back on them with my first vote... With congressional approval ratings at historic lows, it's time for our elected officials to listen to the people and rethink business as usual so we can move our country forward together."

According to USA Today, Blum has "made it his central focus to change the way Congress treats itself by supporting efforts to strip away the trappings of elective office." Blum and Democrat Beto O'Rourke started the Congressional Term Limits Caucus. He co-sponsored legislation to end lawmakers' access to first class travel and luxury car leases, he supports ending the congressional pension system, and he has introduced a bill to institute a lifetime ban on lawmakers ever becoming lobbyists.

In 2015, Blum returned $102,000 of his unspent 2015 office budget to the United States Treasury to help pay down the national debt. He did not confirm whether he planned to donate half of his congressional salary to charity, which he had pledged to do on his campaign website. Blum said: "I'm not saying I didn't. I very well may have. But it's not something I'm going to comment on."

Blum supported a constitutional amendment to enforce term limits for congressmen. When asked how many terms he was going to seek in an April 2015 interview, Blum responded, "I'm not going to term limit myself. I definitely believe in term limits, but I don't believe in unilaterally disarming...Do I see myself being in the House of Representatives 10 years from now? No, I don't."

=== Immigration ===
Blum supported President Donald Trump's first 2017 executive order. The order temporarily curtailed immigration from Iraq, Syria, Iran, Libya, Somalia, Sudan, and Yemen until better screening methods are devised. Blum stated that "...The bottom line is they can't properly vet people coming from war-torn areas like Syria and Iraq. If we can't vet people properly, then we shouldn't be allowing them into our country. I'm supportive of that."

=== Abortion ===
Blum opposed abortion. He had voted to defund Planned Parenthood. He supported creating a select committee to investigate Planned Parenthood for allegedly selling fetal tissue.

=== LGBT issues ===
Blum believes that same-sex marriage should be determined by states. In 2016, he voted against an amendment aimed at upholding an executive order barring discrimination against LGBT employees by federal contractors.

=== President Donald Trump ===
In February 2017, he voted against a resolution that would have directed the U.S. House to request ten years of Trump's tax returns, which would then have been reviewed by the House Ways and Means Committee in a closed session.

Blum supported Trump's May 10, 2017, firing of FBI Director James Comey, saying "it's probably time for Comey to go." The FBI was at the time conducting a criminal probe into possible ties between Trump associates and Russia.

=== Trade ===
In June 2018, amid a brewing trade war between the United States and China, Blum urged the Trump administration "to avoid a trade war". In July 2018, Blum thanked Trump for "having political courage to renegotiate these trade deals."

== Personal life ==
Blum was born and raised in Dubuque, the son of Celeste M. (Van Der Meulen) and Wallace Lee Blum, a World War II veteran. He resides in Dubuque with his wife, Karen, and their five children. Blum was involved as a creditor to the parents of NHL player Jack Johnson, who was bankrupted by the high rates of the loans his parents took out in his name. Blum is an Episcopalian.

=== Ethics inquiry ===
In February 2018, the Associated Press reported that Blum had "violated House ethics rules by failing to disclose his role in a company that he formed." Blum was listed as a director of internet marketing company Tin Moon Corp. when it was incorporated in May 2016. Tin Moon's address is listed in the same Dubuque office as a construction software company Blum owns, Digital Canal, and Blum's chief of staff was featured in online testimonials for Tin Moon. Blum said he made an oversight in failing to disclose his ties to the company on his personal financial disclosure, and that the company was "basically worth less than $1,000 and not doing business in 2016." In March 2018, Tin Moon removed Blum from its website.

In July 2018, the Office of Congressional Ethics referred an ethics investigation case into Blum to the House Ethics Committee. The House Ethics Committee announced that it would release its findings prior to December 17, 2018. Blum described the inquiry into him as a "crusade of personal destruction" waged by the "radical left".

=== Electoral history ===
Iowa's 1st congressional district election (2018)
Party	Candidate	Votes	%
Democratic	Abby Finkenauer	170,342	51.0%
Republican	Rod Blum (incumbent)	153,442	45.9%
Libertarian	Troy Hageman	10,228	3.1%
Total votes		332,516	100.00%
Democratic gain from Republican			

Iowa's 1st congressional district election (2016)
Party	Candidate	Votes	%
Republican	Rod Blum (incumbent)	206,903	54%
Democratic	Monica Vernon	177,403	46%
(Write-ins)	Others	671	0.2%
Total votes		384,977	100.00%

Iowa's 1st congressional district election (2014)
Party	Candidate	Votes	%
Republican	Rod Blum	145,383	51%
Democratic	Pat Murphy	138,335	49%
(Write-ins)	Others	348	0.12%
Total votes		284,066	100.00%
Republican gain from Democratic			

U.S. House of Representatives
Preceded by Bruce Braley	Member of the U.S. House of Representatives from Iowa's 1st congressional district 2015–2019	Succeeded by Abby Finkenauer
U.S. order of precedence (ceremonial)
Preceded by Mike Blouin as Former U.S. Representative	Order of precedence of the United States as Former U.S. Representative	Succeeded by David Young as Former U.S. Representative
