= United States House Small Business Subcommittee on Contracting and Infrastructure =

One of five subcommittees of House Small Business Committee

Subcommittee of Committee on Small Business
- Active United States House of Representatives; 119th Congress

Leadership
- Chair: Tony Wied (R)
- Ranking Member: Gil Cisneros (D)

Structure
- Seats: 11 (11 currently filled) 6/6 5/5
- Political parties: Majority (6): Republican (6); Minority (5): Democratic (5)

Meeting place
- 2361, Rayburn House Office Building; Washington, D.C. 20515

Phone number
- (202)-225-5821

The House Small Business Subcommittee on Contracting and Infrastructure is one of five subcommittees of the House Small Business Committee.

== Jurisdiction ==
From the subcommittee website:

This Subcommittee will assess the federal procurement system, including those programs designed specifically to enhance participation by small businesses in providing goods and services to the federal government. The Subcommittee will review the broad scope of opportunities available to small businesses for rebuilding and modernizing the nations’ infrastructure.

== Members, 119th Congress ==
Majority	Minority
Nick LaLota, New York, Chair; Dan Meuser, Pennsylvania; Brian Jack, Georgia; Kimberlyn King-Hinds, Northern Mariana Islands	Gil Cisneros, California, Ranking Member; Hillary Scholten, Michigan; Kelly Morrison, Minnesota; George Latimer, New York; Derek Tran, California
Ex officio
Roger Williams, Texas	Nydia Velázquez, New York

== Historical membership rosters ==
=== 115th Congress ===
Majority	Minority
Steve Knight, California, Chairman; James Comer, Kentucky; Steve King, Iowa; Ron Estes, Kansas	Stephanie Murphy, Florida, Ranking Member; Yvette Clarke, New York; Dwight Evans, Pennsylvania; Al Lawson, Florida

=== 116th Congress ===
Majority	Minority
Jared Golden, Maine, Chair; Marc Veasey, Texas; Judy Chu, California	Pete Stauber, Minnesota, Ranking Member; Jim Hagedorn, Minnesota; Troy Balderson, Ohio

=== 117th Congress ===
Majority	Minority
Kweisi Mfume, Maryland, Chair; Jared Golden, Maine; Andy Kim, New Jersey; Marie Newman, Illinois	Maria Elvira Salazar, Florida, Ranking Member; Jim Hagedorn, Minnesota; Pete Stauber, Minnesota; Dan Meuser, Pennsylvania; Scott L. Fitzgerald, Wisconsin
Ex officio
Nydia Velázquez, New York	Blaine Luetkemeyer, Missouri

=== 118th Congress ===
Majority	Minority
Nick LaLota, New York, Chair; María Elvira Salazar, Florida; Jake Ellzey, Texas; Marc Molinaro, New York; Aaron Bean, Florida; Celeste Maloy, Utah (from December 7, 2023)	Hillary Scholten, Michigan, Ranking Member; Kweisi Mfume, Maryland; Morgan McGarvey, Kentucky; Judy Chu, California; Shri Thanedar, Michigan
Ex officio
Roger Williams, Texas	Nydia Velázquez, New York
