= United States House Small Business Subcommittee on Innovation, Entrepreneurship, and Workforce Development =

Subcommittee of Committee on Small Business
- Active United States House of Representatives; 119th Congress

Leadership
- Chair: Brian Jack (R)
- Ranking Member: Hillary Scholten (D)

Structure
- Seats: 11 (11 currently filled) 6/6 5/5
- Political parties: Majority (6): Republican (6); Minority (5): Democratic (5)

Meeting place
- 2361, Rayburn House Office Building; Washington, D.C. 20515

Phone number
- (202)-225-5821

The House Small Business Subcommittee on Innovation, Entrepreneurship, and Workforce Development is one of five subcommittees of the United States House Committee on Small Business. It was previously known as the Subcommittee on Health and Technology.

== Jurisdiction ==
From the subcommittee website:

This Subcommittee will evaluate the operation of the financial markets in the United States and their ability to provide needed capital to small businesses. In addition, the Subcommittee will review federal programs, especially those overseen by the SBA, aimed at assisting entrepreneurs in obtaining needed capital. Since the tax policy plays an integral role in access to capital, this Subcommittee also will examine the impact of federal tax policies on small businesses.

== Members, 119th Congress ==
Majority	Minority
Brian Jack, Georgia, Chair; Tony Wied, Wisconsin; Rob Bresnahan, Pennsylvania; Troy Downing, Montana; Derek Schmidt, Kansas	Hillary Scholten, Michigan, Ranking Member; Lateefah Simon, California; Johnny Olszewski, Maryland; Morgan McGarvey, Kentucky; LaMonica McIver, New Jersey
Ex officio
Roger Williams, Texas	Nydia Velázquez, New York

== Historical membership rosters ==
=== 115th Congress ===
Majority	Minority
Amata Coleman Radewagen, American Samoa, Chairwoman; Blaine Luetkemeyer, Missouri; Dave Brat, Virginia; Jenniffer Gonzalez, Puerto Rico; Brian Fitzpatrick, Pennsylvania; Roger Marshall, Kansas	Al Lawson, Florida, Ranking Member; Adriano Espaillat, New York

=== 116th Congress ===
Majority	Minority
Jason Crow, Colorado, Chair; Marc Veasey, Texas; Chrissy Houlahan, Pennsylvania; Abby Finkenauer, Iowa; Andy Kim, New Jersey; Sharice Davids, Kansas	Troy Balderson, Ohio, Ranking Member; Tim Burchett, Tennessee; Kevin Hern, Oklahoma; John Joyce, Pennsylvania

=== 117th Congress ===
Majority	Minority
Jason Crow, Colorado, Chair; Carolyn Bourdeaux, Georgia; Chrissy Houlahan, Pennsylvania; Sharice Davids, Kansas; Dean Phillips, Minnesota; Marie Newman, Illinois	Young Kim, California, Ranking Member; Roger Williams, Texas; Andrew Garbarino, New York; Maria Elvira Salazar, Florida
Ex officio
Nydia Velázquez, New York	Blaine Luetkemeyer, Missouri

=== 118th Congress ===
Majority	Minority
Marc Molinaro, New York, Chair; Tracey Mann, Kansas; María Elvira Salazar, Florida; Jake Ellzey, Texas; Eli Crane, Arizona	Morgan McGarvey, Kentucky, Ranking Member; Shri Thanedar, Michigan; Chris Pappas, New Hampshire; Dean Phillips, Minnesota; Judy Chu, California
Ex officio
Roger Williams, Texas	Nydia Velázquez, New York
