= Marie Newman =

American politician (born 1964)

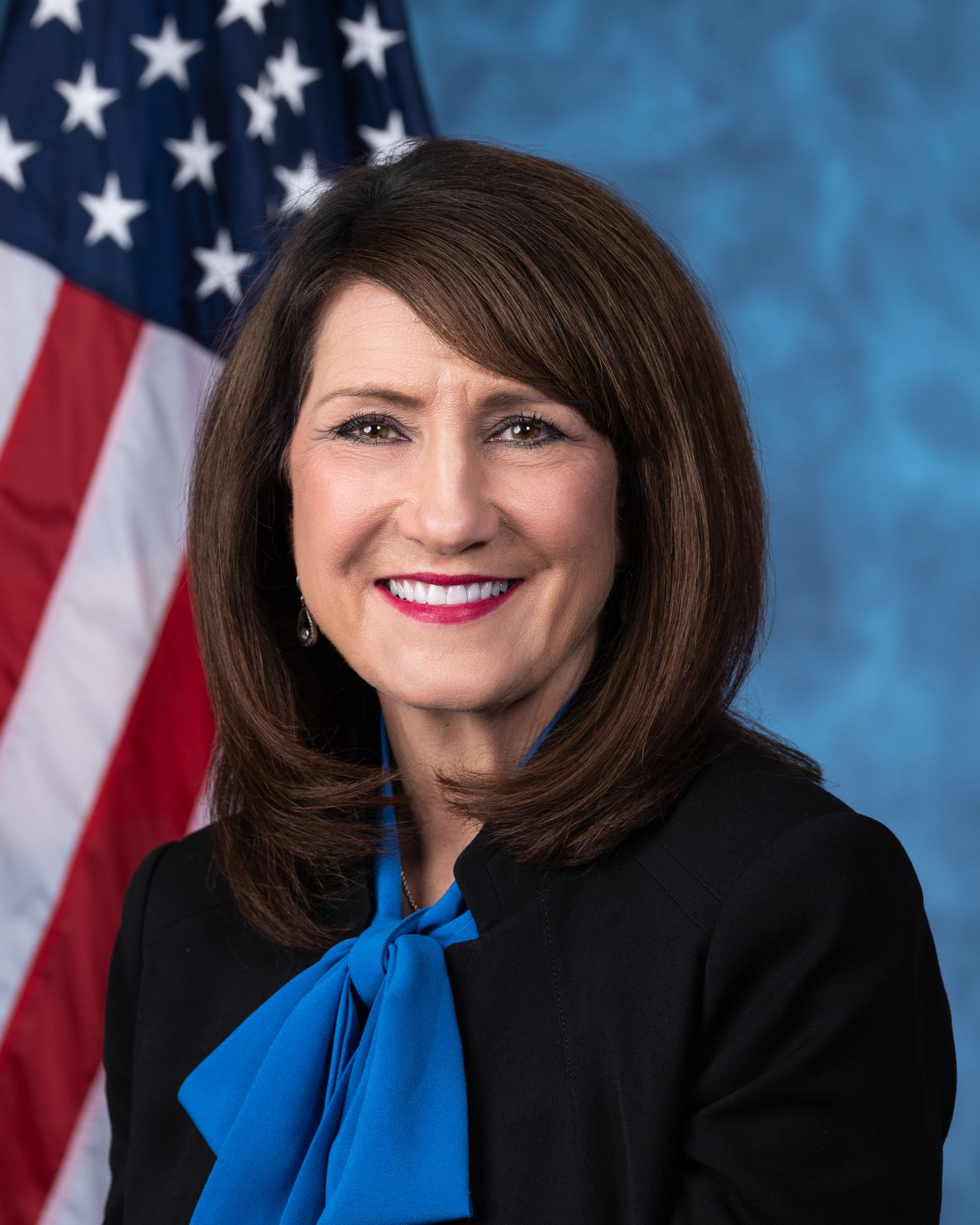
- Official portrait, 2020

Member of the U.S. House of Representatives from Illinois's 3rd district
- In office January 3, 2021 – January 3, 2023
- Preceded by: Dan Lipinski
- Succeeded by: Delia Ramirez (redistricted)

Personal details
- Born: Marie Klassen; April 13, 1964 (age 62) Evergreen Park, Illinois, U.S.
- Party: Democratic
- Spouse: Jim Newman (m. 1996)
- Children: 2
- Education: Marquette University; University of Wisconsin, Madison (BA)
- Newman's voice Newman on Transgender Day of Remembrance and honors those killed. Recorded November 17, 2021

Marie Newman (née Klassen; born April 13, 1964) is an American politician and marketing consultant who served as the U.S. representative from Illinois's 3rd congressional district from 2021 to 2023. The district encompassed parts of southwestern Chicago as well as many of its nearby suburbs, such as Oak Lawn, Western Springs, and Lockport. Newman was elected to the United States House of Representatives as the Democratic nominee, after defeating incumbent Dan Lipinski in the 2020 primary election.

Due to redistricting as a result of the 2020 United States Census, Newman faced a choice in 2022 between running in the heavily Hispanic 4th district into which her home had been drawn or against Sean Casten in a district with the majority of her former area. Newman opted to run against Casten in the Democratic primary, but she was defeated.

In April 2023, Newman was appointed chief executive officer of Little City Foundation, a social-services organization serving people with intellectual and developmental disabilities.

== Early life and career ==
Newman was born Marie Klassen in Evergreen Park, Illinois, (Note: Sometimes described as a native of Beverly, her family lived in the Beverly neighborhood of Chicago, not Beverly township in central Illinois.) on April 13, 1964, at the Little Company of Mary Hospital. She attended Carl Sandburg High School in Orland Park. After attending Marquette University for a year and a half, she transferred to the University of Wisconsin–Madison, where she graduated with a bachelor's degree.

Newman worked for multiple firms as an agency executive. She began her own consulting firm in 2005. She also established her own nonprofit to combat bullying after one of her children was bullied. Governor Pat Quinn appointed her to a regional anti-bullying task force and Sears Holdings Corporation asked her to establish a national anti-bullying coalition of 70 nonprofit organizations.

Newman co-wrote the book When Your Child is Being Bullied, a guide for parents. Her practical advice includes making detailed notes of what the child says at home, before bringing a complaint to school officials, because children may be apt to hide their problem when in the school setting.

Newman has worked on several Democratic campaigns for public office. Between 2015 and 2017 she lobbied for gun control measures such as background checks.

== Career after U.S. House of Representatives ==
In April 2023, Newman was appointed chief executive officer of Little City Foundation, a social services organization serving people with intellectual and developmental disabilities. Little City serves over 900 people through its residential facilities, day programs, and at-home assistance in northern Illinois. Newman had a personal connection to Little City, having volunteered when she was young. Two of her cousins received Little City services.

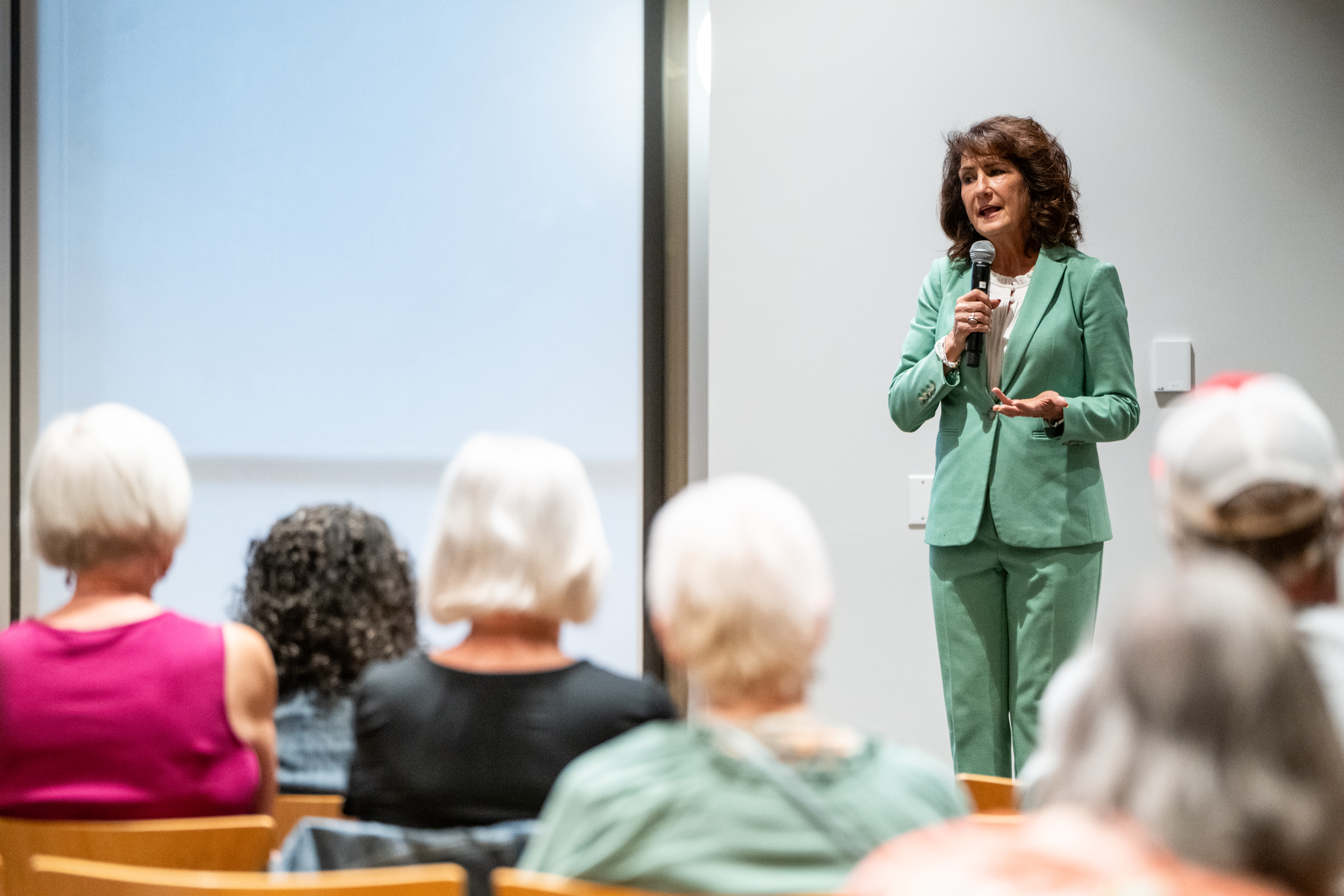
Newman speaks at an author conversation at the Oak Park Public Library in 2025.

Newman's book, A Life Made From Scratch: Lessons from a Controversial Congresswoman, Mompreneur, and Unstoppable Political Activist documenting her time running and joining Congress, was published by Koehler Books in 2025.

== U.S. House of Representatives ==
=== Elections ===
==== 2018 ====
Newman supported Bernie Sanders in the 2016 Democratic presidential primary in Illinois and Hillary Clinton in the November general election. The day after Clinton lost, she applied to the Illinois Women's Institute for Leadership. By January 1, 2017, Newman had closed her business to turn her attention to politics full-time.

On April 10, 2017, Newman declared her candidacy for Illinois's 3rd congressional district, challenging Democratic incumbent Dan Lipinski, a member of the Blue Dog Coalition, who had held the seat since 2005, succeeding his father, who held it for 22 years. (Note: The district was numbered as the 5th from 1983 to 1993.) Newman ran to Lipinski's left, and was endorsed by the Human Rights Campaign, the Progressive Change Campaign Committee, Planned Parenthood, EMILY's List, the SEIU state council, National Nurses United, the Illinois Federation of Teachers, the Feminist Majority Foundation, NARAL Pro-Choice America, Democracy for America, MoveOn, and Our Revolution, and several Democratic members of Congress, including Senator Kirsten Gillibrand of New York and Representatives Luis Gutiérrez and Jan Schakowsky, both Illinois Democrats. Lipinski defeated Newman with 51.2% of the vote to her 48.8%.

==== 2020 ====
Newman ran against Lipinski again in the 2020 Democratic primary. She received endorsements from Representative Alexandria Ocasio-Cortez and presidential candidates Senators Elizabeth Warren, Bernie Sanders, Cory Booker, and Kirsten Gillibrand, as well as Chicago Mayor Lori Lightfoot. The race had special significance for progressive women's groups after other candidates they supported lost primary races earlier in March in Texas and the principal women candidates for the Democratic presidential nomination had ended their campaigns.

On March 17, 2020, Newman narrowly defeated Lipinski in the Democratic primary with 47.26% of the vote to his 44.72%. Her victory ended the Lipinski family's 38-year hold on the district. Bill Lipinski won the seat in 1982, when it was numbered as the 5th district (it has been the 3rd since 1993), and was succeeded by his son Dan in 2005.

On November 3, Newman won the general election, defeating Republican Will County Supervisor Mike Fricilone. With 88% of the vote counted, she led by about 30,000 votes, and had received about 55% of the vote.

==== 2022 ====
In October 2021, Democrats in the Illinois legislature passed a new congressional map that radically changed Newman's district. The map placed Newman's home into a district with Representative Jesús "Chuy" García, who represents a majority-Hispanic district. Newman announced that she would run in the redrawn 6th District, which overlaps her original district. She thus challenged incumbent Representative Sean Casten in the 2022 Democratic primary. In the redrawn 6th district, 41% of voters are from Newman's former district and 23% are from Casten's former district, according to calculations by Daily Kos. On June 28, 2022, Newman lost the primary to Casten.

=== Tenure ===
In January 2021, Newman voted to impeach President Donald Trump.

In November 2021, Newman voted for the Build Back Better Act, which passed the House of Representatives.

==== House Ethics Committee review ====
In 2021, the House Ethics Committee launched a review after she was accused of having signed a contract promising Iymen Chehade a job in her Congressional office in exchange for Chehade's not entering the 2020 primary opposite to Newman. Other documents alleged to be included in the review also stipulated that Newman adopt several policy positions with respect to the Israeli-Palestinian conflict. In her contract with Chehade, Newman also allegedly agreed to adopt specific stances with respect to BDS-related legislation and aid to Israel, and to refuse to work with a number of pro-Israel organizations, such as the Jewish National Fund.

The contract to employ Chehade in Newman's Congressional staff was revealed when Chehade sued Newman after she assumed office in January, 2021. Newman had not given Chehade a job; Chehade claimed that he had decided not to run for the Congressional seat pursuant to her promise to hire him. House of Representatives General Counsel Douglas Letter wrote that Newman's contract, written as a private citizen, was not enforceable when she was in public office. In a motion to dismiss, Newman's counsel acknowledged that the contract was in violation of House and federal rules. The case was settled without publicly revealing the terms.

On October 15, 2021, the Office of Congressional Ethics (OCE) voted unanimously that there was reason to believe that Newman's agreement with Chehade constituted a de facto bribe and to refer the matter to the House Ethics Committee. Newman's representatives responded that Newman "cooperate[d] completely with the review" but that the OCE had "prejudged the matter from the beginning", also making it clear this was "political theatre". The House Ethics Committee chose not to impanel an investigative subcommittee, and the matter was closed in 2022 after Newman lost the primary election.

A separate complaint was filed with the Federal Election Commission, when FEC campaign finance filings showed that Newman's campaign organization started employing Chehade while he was a witness in the Congressional ethics probe. These payments started soon after Chehade's breach-of-contract suit was settled during 2021. The complaint, by Foundation for Accountability and Civic Trust (FACT) and Citizens for Responsibility and Ethics in Washington (CREW), alleged that the campaign's continued payments to Chehade while he was a witness in the Congressional investigation interfered with that investigation. The Federal Election Commission, after a full investigation, dismissed the complaint in July 2023, finding no wrongdoing.

=== Committee assignments ===
- Committee on Transportation and Infrastructure
  - Subcommittee on Highways and Transit
  - Subcommittee on Railroads, Pipelines, and Hazardous Materials
- Committee on Small Business
  - Subcommittee on Contracting and Workforce
  - Subcommittee on Innovation, Entrepreneurship, and Workforce Development

=== Caucus memberships ===
- Congressional Progressive Caucus
- House Pro-Choice Caucus

== Political positions ==
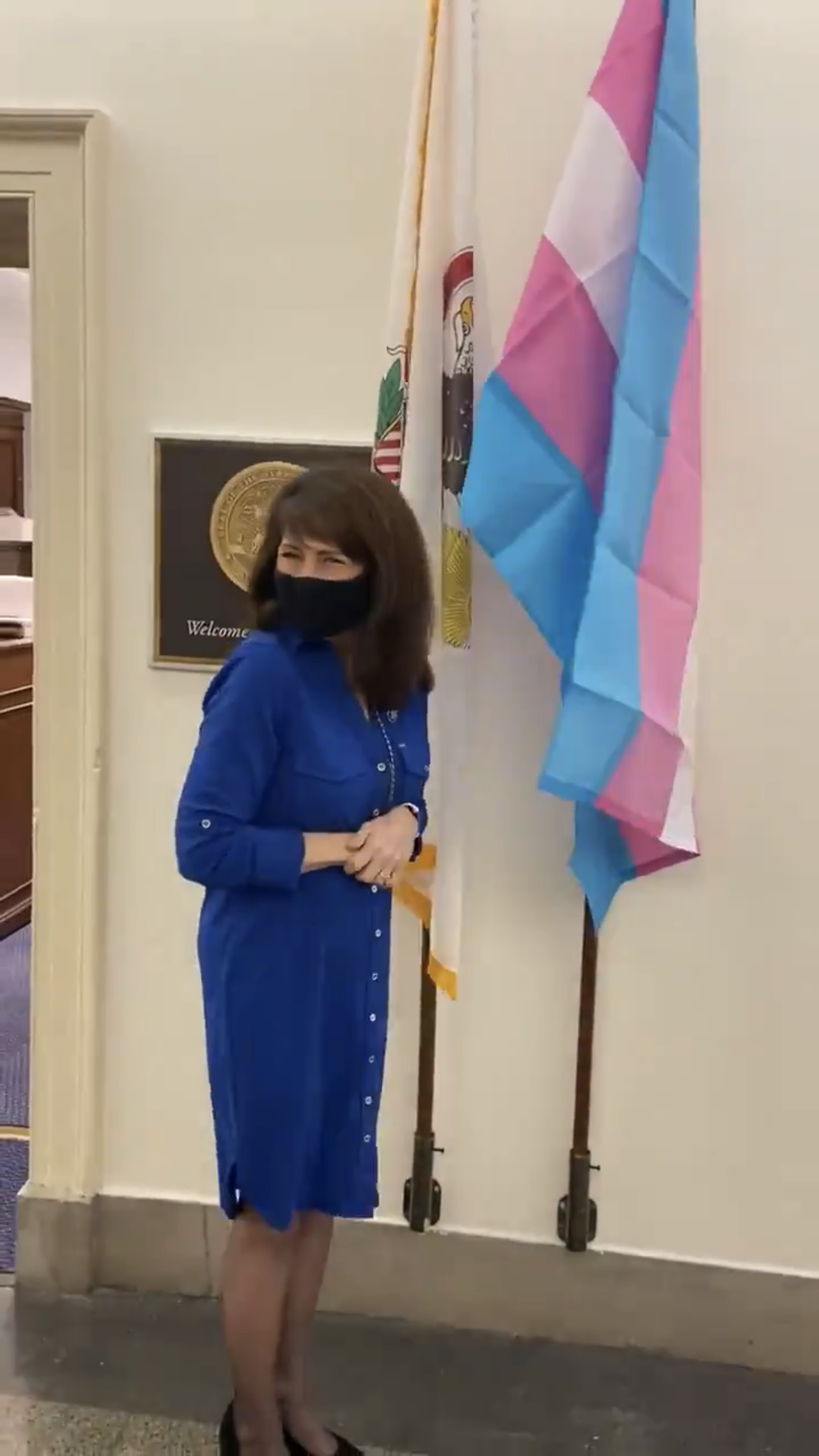
Newman hanging a Trans flag across from Marjorie Taylor Greene's office

Newman represented what has long been the most conservative district of the eight that divide Chicago. Described as "ancestrally Democratic, culturally conservative, multiethnic and viscerally patriotic", the 3rd is the only Chicago-based district with a Cook Partisan Voting Index lower than D+15. Newman identifies as a progressive Democrat. She supports abortion rights, gun control, a $15 minimum wage, and a Green New Deal. Her campaigns were supported by Justice Democrats, an organization that funds progressive candidates, in both 2018 and 2020. The Sunrise Movement supported her campaign in 2020.

=== LGBTQ+ rights ===
Newman also supports the Equality Act, saying, "Without the Equality Act, this nation will never live up to its principles of freedom and equality." She says that she entered politics to make the world a better place for her transgender daughter. After Republican freshman Marjorie Taylor Greene attacked the bill as "disgusting, immoral, and evil" on the House floor, Newman hung a Transgender Pride flag outside her Washington office, which is directly across from Greene's.

=== Israel ===
In September 2021, Newman was one of eight Democrats to vote against the funding of the Iron Dome in Israel.

== Electoral history ==
=== 2018 ===
Illinois 3rd congressional district Democratic primary, 2018
Party	Candidate	Votes	%
Democratic	Dan Lipinski (incumbent)	48,675	51.13
Democratic	Marie Newman	46,530	48.87
Total votes		95,205	100.0

=== 2020 ===
Illinois 3rd Congressional District Democratic primary, 2020
Party	Candidate	Votes	%
Democratic	Marie Newman	52,384	47.26
Democratic	Dan Lipinski (incumbent)	49,568	44.72
Democratic	Rush Darwish	6,351	5.73
Democratic	Charles Hughes	2,549	2.30
Total votes		110,852	100.0

Illinois's 3rd congressional district, 2020
Party	Candidate	Votes	%
Democratic	Marie Newman	172,997	56.4
Republican	Mike Fricilone	133,851	43.6
Total votes		306,848	100.0

=== 2022 ===
Illinois 6th Congressional District Democratic primary, 2022
Party	Candidate	Votes	%
Democratic	Sean Casten	44,414	67.8
Democratic	Marie Newman	19,031	29.1
Democratic	Charles Hughes	2,018	3.1
Total votes		65,463	100.0

== Personal life ==
Newman lives in La Grange, west of Chicago, with her husband, Jim. They married in 1996 and have two children.

Newman's daughter is transgender, and Newman has spoken about how the lack of support for transgender people influenced her to run for office.

== Books ==
- Newman, Marie (2025). A Life Made From Scratch: Lessons from a Controversial Congresswoman, Mompreneur, and Unstoppable Political Activist. Koehler Books. ISBN 979-8888246580. OCLC 1494980551.
- DiMarco, J. E.; Newman, M. K. (2011). When Your Child Is Being Bullied: Real Solutions for Parents, Educators & Other Professionals. ViviSphere. ISBN 978-1587761812. OCLC 793090279.

== See also ==
- Women in the United States House of Representatives

== Notes ==
U.S. House of Representatives
Preceded by Dan Lipinski	Member of the U.S. House of Representatives from Illinois's 3rd congressional district 2021–2023	Succeeded by Delia Ramirez
U.S. order of precedence (ceremonial)
Preceded by William Enyart as Former U.S. Representative	Order of precedence of the United States as Former U.S. Representative	Succeeded by Bobby Bright as Former U.S. Representative
