= United States House Small Business Subcommittee on Rural Development, Energy, and Supply Chains =

Subcommittee of Committee on Small Business
- Active United States House of Representatives; 119th Congress

Leadership
- Chair: Jake Ellzey (R)
- Ranking Member: Kelly Morrison (D)

Structure
- Seats: 11 (10 currently filled) 6/6 4/5
- Political parties: Majority (6): Republican (6); Minority (4): Democratic (4)

Meeting place
- 2361, Rayburn House Office Building; Washington, D.C. 20515

Phone number
- (202)-225-5821

The Subcommittee on Rural Development, Energy, and Supply Chains is one of five subcommittees of the House Small Business Committee. It has previously been known as Subcommittee on Rural Development, Agriculture, Trade and Entrepreneurship and Subcommittee on Agriculture, Energy and Trade, and the Subcommittee on Underserved, Agricultural, and Rural Business Development.

== Jurisdiction ==
From the Subcommittee website:

This Subcommittee will address issues to enhance rural economic and business growth, increase America’s energy independence, and ensure America’s small businesses can compete effectively in a global marketplace. This Subcommittee will review supply chain disruptions impacts on small businesses and the importance of having products made in America.

== Members, 119th Congress ==
Majority	Minority
Jake Ellzey, Texas, Chair; Pete Stauber, Minnesota; Brad Finstad, Minnesota; Tony Wied, Wisconsin; Derek Schmidt, Kansas	Kelly Morrison, Minnesota, Ranking Member; Johnny Olszewski, Maryland; Maggie Goodlander, New Hampshire; Hillary Scholten, Michigan
Ex officio
Roger Williams, Texas	Nydia Velázquez, New York

== Historical membership rosters ==
=== 115th Congress ===
Majority	Minority
Rod Blum, Iowa, Chairman; Steve King, Iowa; Blaine Luetkemeyer, Missouri; Amata Coleman Radewagen, American Samoa; James Comer, Kentucky; Don Bacon, Nebraska	Brad Schneider, Illinois, Ranking Member; Al Lawson, Florida

=== 116th Congress ===
Majority	Minority
Abby Finkenauer, Iowa, Chair; Jared Golden, Maine; Jason Crow, Colorado; Vacancy; Vacancy; Vacancy	John Joyce, Pennsylvania, Ranking Member; Amata Coleman Radewagen, American Samoa; Trent Kelly, Mississippi; Jim Hagedorn, Minnesota; Dan Bishop, North Carolina

=== 117th Congress ===
Majority	Minority
Jared Golden, Maine, Chair; Antonio Delgado, New York; Jason Crow, Colorado	Jim Hagedorn, Minnesota, Ranking Member; Pete Stauber, Minnesota; Roger Williams, Texas; Maria Elvira Salazar, Florida
Ex officio
Nydia Velázquez, New York	Blaine Luetkemeyer, Missouri

=== 118th Congress ===
Majority	Minority
Wesley Hunt, Texas, Chair; Blaine Luetkemeyer, Missouri; Pete Stauber, Minnesota; Dan Meuser, Pennsylvania; Tracey Mann, Kansas	Marie Gluesenkamp Perez, Washington, Ranking Member; Jared Golden, Maine; Hillary Scholten, Michigan; Greg Landsman, Ohio
Ex officio
Roger Williams, Texas	Nydia Velázquez, New York
