= United States House Committee on Small Business =

Standing committee of the United States House of Representatives

House Small Business Committee
Standing committee
- Active United States House of Representatives; 119th Congress

History
- Formed: December 4, 1941

Leadership
- Chair: Roger Williams (R); Since January 3, 2023
- Ranking Member: Nydia M. Velázquez (D); Since January 3, 2023

Structure
- Seats: 27 (26 currently filled) 14/15 12/12
- Political parties: Majority (14): Republican (14); Minority (12): Democratic (12)

Jurisdiction
- Oversight authority: Small Business Administration
- Senate counterpart: Senate Small Business Committee

Subcommittees
- Rural Development, Energy, and Supply Chains; Innovation, Entrepreneurship, and Workforce Development; Contracting and Infrastructure; Oversight, Investigations, and Regulations; Economic Growth, Tax, and Capital Access

Meeting place
- 2361, Rayburn House Office Building; Washington, D.C. 20515

Website
- smallbusiness.house.gov (Republican) democrats-smallbusiness.house.gov (Democratic)

Phone number
- (202)-225-5821

The United States House Committee on Small Business is a standing committee of the United States House of Representatives. It was established in 1941 as the House Select Committee on Small Business.

== History ==
On December 4, 1941, the U. S. House of Representatives created the first House Select Committee on Small Business in response to a growing number of small business activists and organizations advocating for more protections and better government policies for America's small businesses. While it had no legislative authority, the select committee became popular with House members and was reauthorized every following Congress until January 5, 1975, when it was made a permanent standing committee. House members then granted the new standing committee with certain areas of legislative jurisdiction and oversight functions, increasing its scope and influence.

Specifically, the House Small Business Committee is charged with assessing and investigating the problems of small businesses and examining the impact of general business practices and trends on small businesses. The committee has oversight and legislative authority over the Small Business Administration (SBA) and its programs, as well as provides assistance to and protection of small businesses, including financial aid and the participation of small business enterprises in federal procurement and government contracts.

== Jurisdiction ==
The Small Business Committee has oversight and legislative jurisdiction over the Small Business Administration and its programs, as well as provides assistance to and protection of small business, including financial aid and the participation of small business enterprises in federal procurement and government contracts. The committee also oversees matters related to the Regulatory Flexibility Act and the Paperwork Reduction Act. The jurisdiction extends to other programs and initiatives addressing small business outside of the confines of these two specific acts.

== Members, 119th Congress ==
Majority	Minority
Roger Williams, Texas, Chair; Pete Stauber, Minnesota; Dan Meuser, Pennsylvania; Beth Van Duyne, Texas; Jake Ellzey, Texas; Mark Alford, Missouri; Nick LaLota, New York; Brad Finstad, Minnesota; Tony Wied, Wisconsin; Rob Bresnahan, Pennsylvania; Brian Jack, Georgia; Troy Downing, Montana; Kimberlyn King-Hinds, Northern Mariana Islands; Derek Schmidt, Kansas; Jimmy Patronis, Florida (from April 8, 2025); Clay Fuller, Georgia (from April 15, 2026)	Nydia Velázquez, New York, Ranking Member; Morgan McGarvey, Kentucky, Vice Ranking Member; Hillary Scholten, Michigan; LaMonica McIver, New Jersey; Gil Cisneros, California; Kelly Morrison, Minnesota; George Latimer, New York; Derek Tran, California; Lateefah Simon, California; Johnny Olszewski, Maryland; Herb Conaway, New Jersey; Maggie Goodlander, New Hampshire; Analilia Mejia, New Jersey (from June 9, 2026)

Resolutions electing members: H.Res. 13 (Chair), H.Res. 14 (Ranking Member), H.Res. 38 (R), H.Res. 40 (D), H.Res. 300 (Patronis), H.Res. 1176 (Fuller), H.Res. 1352 (Mejia)

== Subcommittees ==
Subcommittee	Chair	Ranking Member
Contracting and Infrastructure	Nick LaLota (R-NY)	Gil Cisneros (D-CA)
Economic Growth, Tax, and Capital Access	Beth Van Duyne (R-TX)	LaMonica McIver (D-NJ)
Innovation, Entrepreneurship, and Workforce Development	Brian Jack (R-GA)	Hillary Scholten (D-MI)
Oversight, Investigations, and Regulations	Mark Alford (R-MO)	Derek Tran (D-CA)
Rural Development, Energy and Supply Chains	Jake Ellzey (R-TX)	Kelly Morrison (D-MN)

== Leadership ==
Former chairs are listed below.

Chairs
Name	Party	State	Start	End
Wright Patman	Democratic	Texas	1941	1947
Walter Ploeser	Republican	Missouri	1947	1949
Wright Patman	Democratic	Texas	1949	1953
William Hill	Republican	Colorado	1953	1955
Wright Patman	Democratic	Texas	1955	1963
Joe Evins	Democratic	Tennessee	1963	1976
Tom Steed	Democratic	Oklahoma	1976	1977
Neal Smith	Democratic	Iowa	1977	1981
Parren Mitchell	Democratic	Maryland	1981	1987
John LaFalce	Democratic	New York	1987	1995
Jan Meyers	Republican	Kansas	1995	1997
Jim Talent	Republican	Missouri	1997	2001
Don Manzullo	Republican	Illinois	2001	2007
Nydia Velázquez	Democratic	New York	2007	2011
Sam Graves	Republican	Missouri	2011	2015
Steve Chabot	Republican	Ohio	2015	2019
Nydia Velázquez	Democratic	New York	2019	2023
Roger Williams	Republican	Texas	2023	present

Ranking members
Name	Party	State	Start	End
Charles Halleck	Republican	Indiana	1941	1945
Leonard Hall	Republican	New York	1945	1947
Wright Patman	Democratic	Texas	1947	1949
Charles Halleck	Republican	Indiana	1949	1953
Wright Patman	Democratic	Texas	1953	1955
William Hill	Republican	Indiana	1955	1959
William McCulloch	Republican	Ohio	1959	1965
Arch Moore	Republican	West Virginia	1965	1969
Silvio Conte	Republican	Massachusetts	1969	1979
Joseph McDade	Republican	Pennsylvania	1979	1991
Andy Ireland	Republican	Florida	1991	1993
Jan Meyers	Republican	Kansas	1993	1995
John LaFalce	Democratic	New York	1995	1998
Nydia Velázquez	Democratic	New York	1998	2007
Steve Chabot	Republican	Ohio	2007	2009
Sam Graves	Republican	Ohio	2009	2011
Nydia Velázquez	Democratic	New York	2011	2019
Steve Chabot	Republican	Ohio	2019	2021
Blaine Luetkemeyer	Republican	Missouri	2021	2023
Nydia Velázquez	Democratic	New York	2023	present

== Historical membership rosters ==
=== 118th Congress ===
Majority	Minority
Roger Williams, Texas, Chair; Blaine Luetkemeyer, Missouri; Pete Stauber, Minnesota; Dan Meuser, Pennsylvania; Beth Van Duyne, Texas; María Elvira Salazar, Florida; Tracey Mann, Kansas; Jake Ellzey, Texas; Marc Molinaro, New York; Mark Alford, Missouri; Eli Crane, Arizona; Aaron Bean, Florida; Wesley Hunt, Texas; Nick LaLota, New York; Celeste Maloy, Utah (from December 6, 2023)	Nydia Velázquez, New York, Ranking Member; Jared Golden, Maine; Kweisi Mfume, Maryland; Dean Phillips, Minnesota; Greg Landsman, Ohio; Marie Gluesenkamp Perez, Washington; Shri Thanedar, Michigan; Morgan McGarvey, Kentucky; Hillary Scholten, Michigan; Judy Chu, California; Sharice Davids, Kansas; Chris Pappas, New Hampshire

Resolutions electing members: H.Res. 14 (Chair), H.Res. 15 (Ranking Member), H.Res. 80 (R), H.Res. 87 (D), H.Res. 913 (R)

Subcommittees

Subcommittee	Chair	Ranking Member
Contracting and Infrastructure	Nick LaLota (R-NY)	Hillary Scholten (D-MI)
Economic Growth, Tax and Capital Access	Dan Meuser (R-PA)	Greg Landsman (D-OH)
Innovation, Entrepreneurship, and Workforce Development	Marc Molinaro (R-NY)	Morgan McGarvey (D-KY)
Oversight, Investigations and Regulations	Beth Van Duyne (R-TX)	Kweisi Mfume (D-MD)
Rural Development, Energy and Supply Chains	Wesley Hunt (R-TX)	Marie Gluesenkamp Perez (D-WA)

=== 117th Congress ===
Majority	Minority
Nydia Velázquez, New York, Chair; Jared Golden, Maine; Jason Crow, Colorado; Sharice Davids, Kansas; Kweisi Mfume, Maryland, Vice Chair; Dean Phillips, Minnesota; Marie Newman, Illinois; Carolyn Bourdeaux, Georgia; Troy Carter, Louisiana (since May 12, 2021); Judy Chu, California; Dwight Evans, Pennsylvania; Antonio Delgado, New York (until May 25, 2022); Chrissy Houlahan, Pennsylvania; Andy Kim, New Jersey; Angie Craig, Minnesota; Scott Peters, California (since June 14, 2022)	Blaine Luetkemeyer, Missouri, Ranking Member; Jim Hagedorn, Minnesota (until February 17, 2022); Pete Stauber, Minnesota; Roger Williams, Texas, Vice Ranking Member; Dan Meuser, Pennsylvania; Claudia Tenney, New York; Andrew Garbarino, New York; Young Kim, California; Beth Van Duyne, Texas; Byron Donalds, Florida; María Elvira Salazar, Florida; Scott L. Fitzgerald, Wisconsin; Mike Flood, Nebraska (since July 13, 2022)

Resolutions electing members: H.Res. 9 (Chair), H.Res. 10 (Ranking Member), H.Res. 62 (D), H.Res. 63 (R), H.Res. 146 (R), H.Res. 384 (D), H.Res. 1173 (D), H.Res. 1225 (R)

Subcommittees

Subcommittee	Chair	Ranking Member
Contracting and Infrastructure	Kweisi Mfume (D-MD)	Maria Elvira Salazar (R-FL)
Economic Growth, Tax and Capital Access	Sharice Davids (D-KS)	Dan Meuser (R-PA)
Innovation, Entrepreneurship, and Workforce Development	Jason Crow (D-CO)	Young Kim (R-CA)
Oversight, Investigations and Regulations	Dean Phillips (D-MN)	Beth Van Duyne (R-TX)
Rural Development, Agriculture, Trade and Entrepreneurship	Jared Golden (D-ME)	Jim Hagedorn (R-MN)

=== 116th Congress ===
Majority	Minority
Nydia Velázquez, New York, Chair; Abby Finkenauer, Iowa; Jared Golden, Maine; Andy Kim, New Jersey; Jason Crow, Colorado; Sharice Davids, Kansas; Kweisi Mfume, Maryland (since May 7, 2020); Judy Chu, California; Marc Veasey, Texas; Dwight Evans, Pennsylvania, Vice Chair; Brad Schneider, Illinois; Adriano Espaillat, New York; Antonio Delgado, New York; Chrissy Houlahan, Pennsylvania; Angie Craig, Minnesota	Steve Chabot, Ohio, Ranking Member; Amata Coleman Radewagen, American Samoa, Vice Ranking Member; Trent Kelly, Mississippi; Troy Balderson, Ohio; Kevin Hern, Oklahoma; Jim Hagedorn, Minnesota; Pete Stauber, Minnesota; Tim Burchett, Tennessee; Ross Spano, Florida; John Joyce, Pennsylvania; Dan Bishop, North Carolina (since September 26, 2019)

Sources: H.Res. 24 (Chair), H.Res. 25 (Ranking Member), H.Res. 73 (D), H.Res. 74 (R), H.Res. 148 (D), H.Res. 596 (R), H.Res. 954 (D)

Subcommittees

Subcommittee	Chair	Ranking Member
Rural Development, Agriculture, Trade, and Entrepreneurship	Abby Finkenauer (D-IA)	John Joyce (R-PA)
Economic Growth, Tax and Capital Access	Andy Kim (D-NJ)	Kevin Hern (R-OK)
Contracting and Infrastructure	Jared Golden (D-ME)	Pete Stauber (R-MN)
Innovation and Workforce Development	Jason Crow (D-CO)	Troy Balderson (R-OH)
Investigations, Oversight and Regulations	Judy Chu (D-CA)	Ross Spano (R-FL)

=== 115th Congress ===
Majority	Minority
Steven Chabot, Ohio, Chair; Steve King, Iowa; Blaine Luetkemeyer, Missouri, Vice Chair; Dave Brat, Virginia; Amata Coleman Radewagen, American Samoa; Steve Knight, California; Trent Kelly, Mississippi; Rod Blum, Iowa; James Comer, Kentucky; Jenniffer González, Puerto Rico; Don Bacon, Nebraska; Brian Fitzpatrick, Pennsylvania; Roger Marshall, Kansas; Ron Estes, Kansas; Ralph Norman, South Carolina; John Curtis, Utah	Nydia Velázquez, New York, Ranking Member; Dwight Evans, Pennsylvania; Stephanie Murphy, Florida; Al Lawson, Florida; Yvette Clarke, New York; Judy Chu, California; Alma Adams, North Carolina, Vice Ranking Member; Adriano Espaillat, New York; Brad Schneider, Illinois

Sources: H.Res. 6 (Chair), H.Res. 7 (Ranking Member), H.Res. 45 (D), H.Res. 51 (R), H.Res. 52, H.Res. 59, H.Res. 95, H.Res. 127 (D)

== See also ==
- U.S. Senate Committee on Small Business and Entrepreneurship
- List of United States House of Representatives committees
