= 2026 Georgia's 13th congressional district special election =

- July 28, 2026 (first round); August 25, 2026 (runoff)

Georgia's 13th congressional district
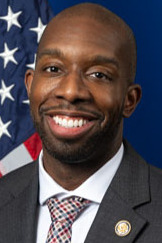

Candidate	Everton Blair	Marcye Scott	Caesar Gonzales
Party	Democratic	Democratic	Republican
First round	7,680; 37.4%	9,441; 46.1%	1,778; 8.7%
Runoff	9,895; 53.9%	8,447; 46.1%	Eliminated
- Blair: 50–60% 70–80% Scott: 50–60% 60–70%
U.S. Representative before election
David Scott
Democratic
Elected U.S. Representative
Everton Blair
Democratic

The 2026 Georgia's 13th congressional district special election was held on July 28, 2026, to elect the U.S. representative for Georgia's 13th congressional district. The special election was triggered following the death of incumbent Democratic representative David Scott on April 22, 2026. As no candidate received a majority of the vote, a runoff was held on August 25 between Democrats Marcye Scott and Everton Blair.

== Background ==
Incumbent representative David Scott died on April 22, 2026, at 80 years old. First elected in 2002, Scott had served 12 terms, and was running for a 13th at the time of his death. Governor Brian Kemp was responsible for calling a special election within 10 days of the vacancy to take place no less than 30 days after the special election is called. Per Georgia state law, all candidates will run on one ballot, with a runoff election scheduled for the top-two candidates if none receive over 50% of the vote. On May 1, Kemp scheduled the election for July 28, 2026. As no candidate got a majority, the runoff election was held August 25, 2026.

== Candidates ==
=== Democratic Party ===
==== Advanced to runoff ====
- Everton Blair, former chair of the Gwinnett County Board of Education, candidate for superintendent of schools in 2022, and candidate in the regular May primary election
- Marcye Scott, computer consultant and daughter of former representative David Scott

==== Eliminated in first round ====
- Carlos Moore, suspended attorney and former municipal judge of Grenada and Clarksdale, Mississippi

==== Disqualified ====
- Tony Brown, military officer

==== Declined ====
- Jasmine Clark, state representative from the 108th district (2019–present) and the nominee in the November general election
- Emanuel Jones, state senator from the 10th district (2005–present) and candidate in the regular May primary election

=== Republican Party ===
==== Eliminated in first round ====
- Caesar Gonzales, aerospace engineer
- Fayth Park, small business owner

== Special election ==
=== Endorsements ===
Marcye Scott (D)

Executive branch officials

- Andrew Young, former ambassador to the United Nations (1977–1979)

U.S. representatives

- Nikema Williams, GA-05 (2021–present)
Everton Blair (D)

U.S. representatives

- Lucy McBath, GA-06 (2019–present)

Statewide officials

- Deval Patrick, former governor of Massachusetts (2007–2015)

State legislators

- Nina Turner, former Ohio's SD-25 (2008–2014)

Organizations

- Track AIPAC

=== First round ===
==== Results ====
2026 Georgia's 13th congressional district special election results
Party	Candidate	Votes	%
Democratic	Marcye Scott	9,441	46.0
Democratic	Everton Blair	7,680	37.4
Republican	Caesar Gonzales	1,778	8.7
Republican	Fayth Park	972	4.7
Democratic	Carlos Moore	639	3.1
Total votes		20,510	100.0

=== Runoff ===
==== Fundraising ====
Campaign finance reports as of August 5, 2026
Candidate	Raised	Spent	Cash on hand
Marcye Scott (D)	$49,539	$47,964	$1,575
Everton Blair (D)	$874,826	$854,016	$20,810
Source: Federal Election Commission

==== Results ====
2026 Georgia's 13th congressional district special election runoff results
Party	Candidate	Votes	%
Democratic	Everton Blair	9,895	53.9
Democratic	Marcye Scott	8,447	46.1
Total votes		18,342	100.0
Democratic hold			

==== By county ====
County	Everton Blair Democratic		Marcye Scott Democratic		Margin		Total votes cast
County	#	%	#	%	#	%	Total votes cast
Clayton (part)	1,132	38.01%	1,846	61.99%	-714	-24.02%	2,978
DeKalb (part)	226	36.28%	397	63.72%	-171	-27.44%	623
Gwinnett (part)	5,709	70.04%	2,442	29.96%	3,267	40.08%	8,151
Henry (part)	984	37.01%	1,675	62.99%	-691	-25.98%	2,659
Newton (part)	590	44.06%	749	55.94%	-159	-11.88%	1,339
Rockdale	1,254	48.38%	1,338	51.62%	-84	-3.24%	2,592
Totals	9,895	53.95%	8,447	46.05%	1,448	7.90%	18,342

== See also ==
- 2026 United States House of Representatives elections
- List of special elections to the United States House of Representatives
- List of United States representatives from Georgia
- 119th United States Congress
