= Congressional Equality Caucus =

Caucus in the U.S. Congress promoting LGBTQ rights

- Chair: Mark Takano
- Founders: Tammy Baldwin; Barney Frank
- Founded: June 4, 2008
- Ideology: LGBTQ rights
- Seats in the House: 192 / 435
- Seats in the House Democratic Caucus: 192 / 214
- Seats in the House Republican Caucus: 0 / 219
- Seats in the United States Senate: 0 / 100

Website
- equality.house.gov

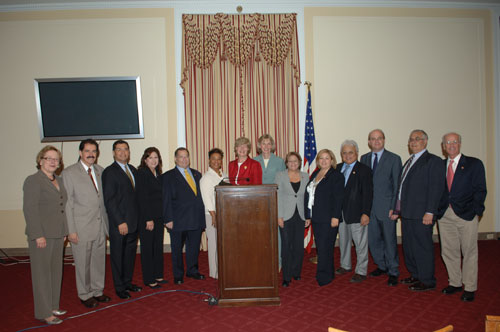
Congressional Equality Caucus Members at the Kick-off Press Conference from left to right: Niki Tsongas (D–MA), José E. Serrano (D–NY), Xavier Becerra (D–CA), Hilda Solis (D–CA), Jerry Nadler (D–NY), Barbara Lee (D–CA), Tammy Baldwin (D–WI), Lois Capps (D–CA), Ileana Ros-Lehtinen (R–FL), Linda Sánchez (D–CA), Mike Honda (D–CA), Jim McGovern (D–MA), Barney Frank (D–MA), Chris Shays (R–CT)

The Congressional Equality Caucus, formerly the Congressional LGBTQ+ Caucus, is a caucus in the US Congress focused on advancing LGBTQ rights in the United States. It was formed by openly gay representatives Tammy Baldwin and Barney Frank on June 4, 2008. The caucus is chaired by the most senior openly LGBTQ member of Congress and is co-chaired by the other openly-LGBTQ members of the House of Representatives; during the 119th Congress, the caucus is chaired by Representative Mark Takano and is co-chaired by representatives Becca Balint, Angie Craig, Sharice Davids, Robert Garcia, Julie Johnson, Sarah McBride, Chris Pappas, Mark Pocan, Ritchie Torres, Emily Randall, and Eric Sorensen (the other sitting LGBT members of the House).

At the beginning of the 119th Congress, the Congressional Equality Caucus is the largest caucus in the United States House of Representatives with 191 members, the most the caucus has ever started a Congress with. In the 118th Congress, the Equality Caucus had a peak membership of 195.

Members of the Equality Caucus have passed several notable pieces of legislation to expand or codify LGBTQ rights into federal law, including the Respect for Marriage Act (which was signed into law by President Biden in 2022) and the Equality Act (which passed the U.S. House in the 116th and 117th Congresses, but was never voted on in the Senate).

== Mission ==
The mission of the caucus is to work for LGBTQI+ rights, the repeal of laws discriminatory against LGBTQI+ persons, the elimination of hate-motivated violence, and improved health and well-being for all persons, regardless of sexual orientation, gender identity, or gender expression. The caucus serves as a resource for members of Congress, their staffs, and the public on LGBTQI+ issues. Unlike the Congressional Black Caucus, famous for admitting only Black members, the Equality Caucus admits any member of Congress who is willing to advance LGBTQI+ rights, regardless of their sexual identity or orientation. Historically, the caucus is co-chaired by every openly-LGBTQI+ member of Congress.

=== Equality PAC ===
In February 2016, caucus leadership formed the Equality PAC to support candidates running for federal office who are LGBTQI+ or seek to advance LGBTQI+ rights. On March 14, 2016, the board of the Equality PAC voted to endorse Hillary Clinton in the 2016 presidential election.

=== Equality Caucus Institute ===
In June 2024, members of the caucus established the Equality Caucus Institute, a 501(c)(3) organization committed to both issues research (through its Center for Federal Policy & Research) as well as training of interns on LGBTQ rights advocacy in both Congress and in other 501(c)(3) organizations (through its Leadership Academy). Mark Takano serves as an inaugural board member.

=== Task forces ===
During the 114th United States Congress, the caucus formed the Transgender Equality Task Force (TETF) and the LGBTQ+ Aging Issues Task Force (now LGBTQI+ Aging Issues Task Force).

In the 119th Congress, the TETF is co-chaired by Pramila Jayapal and Sara Jacobs and is committed to pushing for legislative and administrative action to ensure that transgender people are treated equally and with dignity and respect.

The LGBTQI+ Aging Issues Task Force is chaired by Suzanne Bonamici in the 119th Congress and works to push for legislative and administrative action to protect the dignity and security of elderly LGBTQI+ people.

The International LGBTQI+ Rights Task Force was established in the 119th Congress to "serve as a central organizing point in Congress for advancing the human rights of LGBTQI+ around the world, including by responding to efforts to criminalize LGBTQI+ identities" and is co-chaired by Robert Garcia, Julie Johnson, and Sarah McBride.

== Membership ==
Congressional Equality Caucus in the 118th United States Congress Democratic members (195) Democratic non-members (17)

The below table summarizes the number of caucus members by party over a number of legislative sessions; the drop in membership numbers in the 114th Congress was predominantly due to this being the first year that caucus members were charged fees for their membership ($400 per member, $2,100 per vice chair, $7,500 per co-chair):

Congress	Democratic	Republican	Total
111th	90	1	91
112th	101	3	104
113th	112	2	114
114th	55	0	55
115th	113	2	115
116th	164	1	165
117th	175	0	175
118th	195	0	195
119th	191	0	191

=== Chairs ===
The CEC has every openly-LGBTQI+ member as co-chairs. It was initially founded in 2008 under Tammy Baldwin and Barney Frank, who both departed the House in 2013. Jared Polis was then the most senior LGBT member, and his office served as host for its website and congressional staff support alongside lead sponsorship of its marquee bill (the Employment Non-Discrimination Act) until his departure from the House in 2019. These duties were taken up by David Cicilline, the lead sponsor of the Equality Act. In 2021, Cicilline was being described as the lead chair among the co-chairs through the end of the 117th Congress in January 2021. Mark Pocan was then formally named as chair for the 118th Congress, stating the caucus had moved to a rotating system where the most senior co-chair would formally become the lead chair for a congressional term. Mark Takano, who now leads the Equality Act in the U.S. House, was then named as chair for the 119th Congress.

Start	End	Chair(s)	District
June 4, 2008	January 3, 2013	Tammy Baldwin	WI‑2
June 4, 2008	January 3, 2013	Barney Frank	MA‑4
January 3, 2013	January 3, 2019	Jared Polis	CO‑2
January 3, 2019	January 3, 2023	Dave Cicilline	RI‑1
January 3, 2023	January 3, 2025	Mark Pocan	WI‑2
January 3, 2025	present	Mark Takano	CA‑39

== 119th Congress ==
=== Chair ===
- Mark Takano (D‑CA‑39)

=== Co-chairs ===
- Becca Balint (D‑VT‑AL)
- Angie Craig (D‑MN‑2)
- Sharice Davids (D‑KS‑3)
- Robert Garcia (D‑CA‑42)
- Julie Johnson (D‑TX‑32)
- Sarah McBride (D‑DE‑AL)
- Chris Pappas (D‑NH‑1)
- Mark Pocan (D‑WI‑2)
- Emily Randall (D‑WA‑6)
- Eric Sorensen (D‑IL‑17)
- Ritchie Torres (D‑NY‑15)

=== Vice chairs ===
- Suzanne Bonamici (D‑OR‑1)
- Judy Chu (D‑CA‑28)
- Maxine Dexter (D‑OR‑3)
- Lloyd Doggett (D‑TX‑37
- Lizzie Fletcher (D‑TX‑7)
- Sara Jacobs (D‑CA‑51)
- Pramila Jayapal (D‑WA‑7)
- Raja Krishnamoorthi (D‑IL‑8)
- Ted Lieu (D‑CA‑36)
- Scott Peters (D‑CA‑50)
- Chellie Pingree (D‑ME‑1)
- Mike Quigley (D‑IL‑5)
- Jamie Raskin (D‑MD‑8)
- Andrea Salinas (D‑OR‑6)
- Linda Sánchez (D‑CA‑38)
- Mary Gay Scanlon (D‑PA‑5)
- Debbie Wasserman Schultz (D‑FL‑25)
- Lateefah Simon (D‑CA‑12)
- Darren Soto (D‑FL‑9)
- Maxine Waters (D‑CA‑43)

=== Members ===
- Alma Adams (D‑NC‑12)
- Pete Aguilar (D‑CA‑33)
- Gabe Amo (D‑RI‑1)
- Yassamin Ansari (D‑AZ‑3)
- Jake Auchincloss (D‑MA‑4)
- Nanette Barragán (D‑CA‑44)
- Joyce Beatty (D‑OH‑3)
- Wesley Bell (D‑MO‑1)
- Ami Bera (D‑CA‑6)
- Don Beyer (D‑VA‑8)
- Brendan Boyle (D‑PA‑2)
- Shontel Brown (D‑OH‑11)
- Julia Brownley (D‑CA‑26)
- Nikki Budzinski (D‑IL‑13)
- Salud Carbajal (D‑CA‑24)
- André Carson (D‑IN‑7)
- Troy Carter (D‑LA‑2)
- Greg Casar (D‑TX‑35)
- Ed Case (D‑HI‑1)
- Sean Casten (D‑IL‑6)
- Kathy Castor (D‑FL‑13)
- Joaquin Castro (D‑TX‑20)
- Gil Cisneros (D‑CA‑31)
- Yvette Clarke (D‑NY‑11)
- Emanuel Cleaver (D‑MO‑5)
- Steve Cohen (D‑TN‑9)
- Lou Correa (D‑CA‑46)
- Jim Costa (D‑CA‑21)
- Joe Courtney (D‑CT‑2)
- Jasmine Crockett (D‑TX‑30)
- Jason Crow (D‑CO‑6)
- Danny K. Davis (D‑IL‑7)
- Madeleine Dean (D‑PA‑4)
- Diana DeGette (D‑CO‑1)
- Rosa DeLauro (D‑CT‑3)
- Suzan DelBene (D‑WA‑1)
- Chris Deluzio (D‑PA‑17)
- Mark DeSaulnier (D‑CA‑10)
- Debbie Dingell (D‑MI‑6)
- Sarah Elfreth (D‑MD‑3)
- Veronica Escobar (D‑TX‑16)
- Adriano Espaillat (D‑NY‑13)
- Dwight Evans (D‑PA‑3)
- Bill Foster (D‑IL‑11)
- Valerie Foushee (D‑NC‑4)
- Lois Frankel (D‑FL‑22)
- Laura Friedman (D‑CA‑30)
- Maxwell Frost (D‑FL‑10)
- John Garamendi (D‑CA‑8)
- Chuy García (D‑IL‑4)
- Sylvia Garcia (D‑TX‑29)
- Marie Gluesenkamp Perez (D‑WA‑3)
- Laura Gillen (D‑NY‑4)
- Jared Golden (D‑ME‑2)
- Dan Goldman (D‑NY‑10)
- Jimmy Gomez (D‑CA‑34)
- Josh Gottheimer (D‑NJ‑5)
- Al Green (D‑TX‑9)
- Adelita Grijalva (D‑AZ‑7)
- Jahana Hayes (D‑CT‑5)
- Pablo José Hernández (D–NY)
- Jim Himes (D‑CT‑4)
- Steven Horsford (D‑NV‑4)
- Chrissy Houlahan (D‑PA‑6)
- Val Hoyle (D‑OR‑4)
- Jared Huffman (D‑CA‑2)
- Glenn Ivey (D‑MD‑4)
- Hank Johnson (D‑GA‑4)
- Sydney Kamlager-Dove (D‑CA‑37)
- Bill Keating (D‑MA‑9)
- Robin Kelly (D‑IL‑2)
- Tim Kennedy (D‑NY‑26)
- Ro Khanna (D‑CA‑17)
- Greg Landsman (D‑OH‑1)
- Rick Larsen (D‑WA‑2)
- John B. Larson (D‑CT‑1)
- George Latimer (D‑NY‑16)
- Summer Lee (D‑PA‑12)
- Susie Lee (D‑NV‑3)
- Teresa Leger Fernandez (D‑NM‑3)
- Mike Levin (D‑CA‑49)
- Sam Liccardo (D‑CA‑16)
- Zoe Lofgren (D‑CA‑18)
- Stephen Lynch (D‑MA‑8)
- Seth Magaziner (D‑RI‑2)
- John Mannion (D‑NY‑22)
- Doris Matsui (D‑CA‑7)
- Lucy McBath (D‑GA‑6)
- April McClain Delaney (D‑MD‑6)
- Jennifer McClellan (D‑VA‑4)
- Kristen McDonald Rivet (D‑MI‑8)
- Morgan McGarvey (D‑KY‑3)
- LaMonica McIver (D‑NJ‑10)
- Gregory Meeks (D‑NY‑5)
- Rob Menendez (D‑NJ‑8)
- Grace Meng (D‑NY‑6)
- Kweisi Mfume (D‑MD‑7)
- Dave Min (D‑CA‑47)
- Gwen Moore (D‑WI‑4)
- Joseph Morelle (D‑NY‑25)
- Kelly Morrison (D‑MN‑3)
- Jared Moskowitz (D‑FL‑23)
- Seth Moulton (D‑MA‑6)
- Frank J. Mrvan (D‑IN‑1)
- Kevin Mullin (D‑CA‑15)
- Jerry Nadler (D‑NY‑12)
- Joe Neguse (D‑CO‑2)
- Donald Norcross (D‑NJ‑1)
- Eleanor Holmes Norton (D‑DC‑AL)
- Alexandria Ocasio-Cortez (D‑NY‑14)
- Johnny Olszewski Jr. (D‑MD‑2)
- Ilhan Omar (D‑MN‑5)
- Frank Pallone (D‑NJ‑6)
- Jimmy Panetta (D‑CA‑19)
- Nancy Pelosi (D‑CA‑11)
- Brittany Pettersen (D‑CO‑7)
- Nellie Pou (D‑NJ‑9)
- Ayanna Pressley (D‑MA‑7)
- Delia Ramirez (D‑IL‑3)
- Josh Riley (D‑NY‑19)
- Luz Rivas (D‑CA‑29)
- Deborah Ross (D‑NC‑2)
- Raul Ruiz (D‑CA‑25)
- Pat Ryan (D‑NY‑18)
- Jan Schakowsky (D‑IL‑9)
- Brad Schneider (D‑IL‑10)
- Hillary Scholten (D‑MI‑3)
- Kim Schrier (D‑WA‑8)
- Bobby Scott (D‑VA‑3)
- David Scott (D‑GA‑13)
- Terri Sewell (D‑AL‑7)
- Brad Sherman (D‑CA‑32)
- Adam Smith (D‑WA‑9)
- Melanie Stansbury (D‑NM‑1)
- Greg Stanton (D‑AZ‑4)
- Haley Stevens (D‑MI‑11)
- Marilyn Strickland (D‑WA‑10)
- Suhas Subramanyam (D‑VA‑10)
- Emilia Sykes (D‑OH‑13)
- Shri Thanedar (D‑MI‑13)
- Bennie Thompson (D‑MS‑2)
- Dina Titus (D‑NV‑1)
- Rashida Tlaib (D‑MI‑12)
- Jill Tokuda (D‑HI‑2)
- Paul Tonko (D‑NY‑20)
- Norma Torres (D‑CA‑35)
- Lori Trahan (D‑MA‑3)
- Derek Tran (D‑CA‑45)
- Lauren Underwood (D‑IL‑14)
- Juan Vargas (D‑CA‑52)
- Gabe Vasquez (D‑NM‑2)
- Marc Veasey (D‑TX‑33)
- Nydia Velázquez (D‑NY‑7)
- Eugene Vindman (D‑VA‑7)
- James Walkinshaw (D‑VA‑11)
- Bonnie Watson Coleman (D‑NJ‑12)
- George Whitesides (D‑CA‑27)
- Nikema Williams (D‑GA‑5)
- Frederica Wilson (D‑FL‑24)

== Former co-chairs ==
- Tammy Baldwin (D–WI; elected to Senate in 2012)
- David Cicilline (D–RI; retired in 2023)
- Barney Frank (D–MA; retired in 2013)
- Mondaire Jones (D–NY; lost renomination in 2022 due to redistricting)
- Sean Patrick Maloney (D–NY; lost re-election in 2022)
- Jared Polis (D–CO; elected to become Governor of Colorado in 2018)
- Kyrsten Sinema (D–AZ; elected to Senate in 2018)
- Katie Hill (D–CA; resigned in 2019)

== Former members ==
- Neil Abercrombie (D–HI; ran for governor of Hawaii in 2010)
- Rob Andrews (D–NJ; resigned in 2014)
- Gary Ackerman (D–NY; retired in 2013)
- Karen Bass (D–CA; elected mayor of Los Angeles in 2022)
- Xavier Becerra (D–CA; resigned to become attorney general of California in 2017)
- Shelley Berkley (D–NV; ran for Senate in 2012)
- Howard Berman (D–CA; defeated in 2012)
- Tim Bishop (D–NY; retired in 2015)
- Earl Blumenauer (D–OR; left caucus in 2023)
- Lisa Blunt Rochester (D–DE; elected to Senate in 2024)
- Jamaal Bowman (D–NY; lost renomination in 2024)
- Bob Brady (D–PA)
- Bruce Braley (D–IA; unsuccessfully ran for Senate in 2014)
- Anthony Brindisi (D–NY; defeated in 2021 after contested election)
- Anthony Brown (D–MD; elected attorney general of Maryland in 2022)
- Cori Bush (D–MO; lost renomination in 2024)
- Cheri Bustos (D–IL; retired in 2022)
- Yadira Caraveo (D–CO; defeated in 2024)
- Tony Cárdenas (D–CA; retired in 2024)
- Matt Cartwright (D–PA; defeated in 2024)
- Lois Capps (D–CA; retired in 2017)
- Michael Capuano (D–MA)
- Gil Cisneros (D–CA; defeated in 2020)
- Katherine Clark (D–MA; left caucus when elected Minority Whip)
- Hansen Clarke (D–MI; defeated in 2012)
- Gerry Connolly (D–VA; died in 2025)
- John Conyers (D–MI)
- TJ Cox (D–CA; defeated in 2020)
- Charlie Crist (D–FL; ran for governor of Florida in 2022)
- Joe Cunningham (D–SC; defeated in 2020)
- Carlos Curbelo (R–FL; defeated in 2018)
- Susan Davis (D–CA; retired in 2021)
- Peter DeFazio (D–OR)
- Bill Delahunt (D–MA; retired in 2011)
- John Delaney (D–MD)
- Rosa DeLauro (D–CT)
- Antonio Delgado (D–NY, resigned to become lieutenant governor of New York in 2022)
- Val Demings (D–FL; retired in 2022)
- Ted Deutch (D–FL, resigned in 2022 to head the American Jewish Committee)
- Mike Doyle (D–PA)
- Keith Ellison (D–MN)
- Eliot Engel (D–NY; lost renomination in 2020)
- Elizabeth Esty (D–CT)
- Chaka Fattah (D–PA)
- Bob Filner (D–CA; elected mayor of San Diego in 2012)
- Abby Finkenauer (D–IA; defeated in 2020)
- Marcia L. Fudge (D–OH)
- Chuy García (D–IL)
- Tulsi Gabbard (D–HI; ran for the Democratic presidential nominee in 2020; did not run for reelection)
- Ruben Gallego (D–AZ; elected to Senate in 2024)
- Gabby Giffords (D–AZ; resigned in 2012)
- Charlie Gonzalez (D–TX; retired in 2013)
- Luis Gutierrez (D–IL)
- Deb Haaland (D–NM; resigned to become United States Secretary of the Interior in 2021)
- Josh Harder (D-CA; left caucus in 2023)
- Kai Kahele (D–HI; ran for governor of Hawaii in 2022)
- Janice Hahn (D–CA; elected to Los Angeles County Board of Supervisors in 2016)
- Colleen Hanabusa (D–HI; ran for governor of Hawaii in 2018)
- Richard L. Hanna (R–NY; retired in 2017)
- Phil Hare (D–IL; defeated in 2010)
- Jane Harman (D–CA; resigned in 2011)
- Alcee Hastings (D–FL; died in 2021)
- Nan Hayworth (R–NY; defeated in 2012)
- Denny Heck (D–WA; elected lieutenant governor of Washington in 2020)
- Martin Heinrich (D–NM; elected to Senate in 2012)
- Maurice Hinchey (D–NY; retired in 2013)
- Mazie Hirono (D–HI; elected to Senate in 2012)
- Eleanor Holmes Norton (D–District of Columbia)
- Rush Holt Jr. (D–NJ; retired in 2015)
- Steve Israel (D–NY; retired in 2017)
- Jeff Jackson (D–NC; elected attorney general of North Carolina in 2024)
- Sheila Jackson Lee (D–TX)
- Hakeem Jeffries (D–NY; left caucus when elected Minority Leader)
- Eddie Bernice Johnson (D–TX; retired in 2022)
- Joe Kennedy III (D–MA; ran for Democratic nominee for U.S. Senate in 2020)
- Patrick J. Kennedy (D–RI; retired in 2011)
- Ruben Kihuen (D–NV)
- Dan Kildee (D–MI; retired in 2024)
- Mary Jo Kilroy (D–OH; defeated in 2010)
- Andy Kim (D–NJ; elected to Senate in 2024)
- Dennis Kucinich (D–OH; defeated in 2012)
- Conor Lamb (D–PA; ran for Democratic nomination for U.S. Senate of Pennsylvania in 2022)
- James Langevin (D–RI)
- Barbara Lee (D–CA; ran for Senate in 2024)
- Andy Levin (D–MI; lost nomination in 2022)
- Sander Levin (D–MI)
- John Lewis (D–GA)
- Dave Loebsack (D–IA; retired in 2021)
- Alan Lowenthal (D–CA; retired in 2022)
- Nita Lowey (D–NY; retired in 2021)
- Elaine Luria (D-VA; lost reelection in 2022)
- Michelle Lujan Grisham (D–NM; elected governor of New Mexico in 2018)
- Stephen Lynch (D–MA)
- Dan Maffei (D–NY; defeated in 2014)
- Tom Malinowski (D-NJ; lost reelection in 2022)
- Carolyn Maloney (D–NY; lost renomination in 2022)
- Ben McAdams (D–UT; defeated in 2020)
- Carolyn McCarthy (D–NY)
- Betty McCollum (D–MN)
- Jim McDermott (D–WA; retired in 2017)
- Jim McGovern (D–MA)
- Don McEachin (D-VA; died in 2022)
- Michael McMahon (D–NY; defeated in 2010)
- Jerry McNerney (D–CA)
- Michael R. McNulty (D–NY; retired in 2008)
- George Miller (D–CA; retired in 2015)
- Jim Moran (D–VA; retired in 2015)
- Debbie Mucarsel-Powell (D–FL; defeated in 2020)
- Chris Murphy (D–CT; elected to Senate in 2012)
- Patrick Murphy (D–PA; defeated in 2010)
- Patrick Murphy (D–FL; ran for Senate in 2016)
- Stephanie Murphy (D–FL; retired in 2022)
- Grace Napolitano (D–CA)
- Marie Newman (D–IL; lost renomination in 2022)
- Beto O'Rourke (D–TX; ran for Senate in 2018)
- Bill Pascrell (D–NJ; died in 2024)
- Ed Perlmutter (D–CO; retired in 2022)
- Gary Peters (D–MI; elected to Senate in 2014)
- Katie Porter (D–CA; ran for Senate in 2024)
- Kathleen Rice (D–NY; retired)
- Laura Richardson (D–CA; defeated in 2012)
- Ileana Ros-Lehtinen (R–FL; retired in 2019)
- Max Rose (D–NY; defeated in 2020)
- Steven Rothman (D–NJ; defeated in 2012)
- Harley Rouda (D–CA; defeated in 2020)
- Gregorio Sablan (D–NMI)
- Loretta Sanchez (D–CA)
- John Sarbanes (D–MD)
- Adam Schiff (D–CA; elected to Senate in 2024)
- Kurt Schrader (D–OR)
- Allyson Schwartz (D–PA; ran for governor of Pennsylvania in 2014)
- José E. Serrano (D–NY; retired in 2021)
- Joe Sestak (D–PA; ran for Senate in 2010)
- Donna Shalala (D–FL; defeated in 2020)
- Chris Shays (R–CT; defeated in 2008)
- Carol Shea-Porter (D–NH)
- Elissa Slotkin (D–MI; elected to Senate in 2024)
- Hilda Solis (D–CA; resigned to become United States Secretary of Labor in 2009)
- Pete Stark (D–CA; defeated in 2012)
- Betty Sutton (D–OH; defeated in 2012)
- Xochitl Torres Small (D–NM; defeated in 2020)
- Edolphus Towns (D–NY; retired in 2013)
- Jeff Van Drew (R–NJ; left caucus in 2020, rejoined in 2021, and left again in 2022)
- Chris Van Hollen (D–MD; elected to Senate in 2016)
- Tim Walz (D–MN; elected to become governor of Minnesota in 2018)
- Peter Welch (D-VT; elected to Senate in 2022)
- Robert Wexler (D–FL; resigned to become president of the Center for Middle East Peace and Economic Cooperation in 2010)
- Jennifer Wexton (D–VA; retired in 2024)
- Lynn Woolsey (D–CA; retired in 2013)
- David Wu (D–OR; resigned in 2011)
- Raúl Grijalva (D–AZ; died in 2025)

== See also ==
- Congressional caucus
- Caucuses of the United States Congress
- List of LGBT members of the United States Congress
- California Legislative LGBT Caucus
- Pennsylvania LGBT Equality Caucus
- New York City Council LGBT Caucus
