= List of LGBTQ members of the United States Congress =

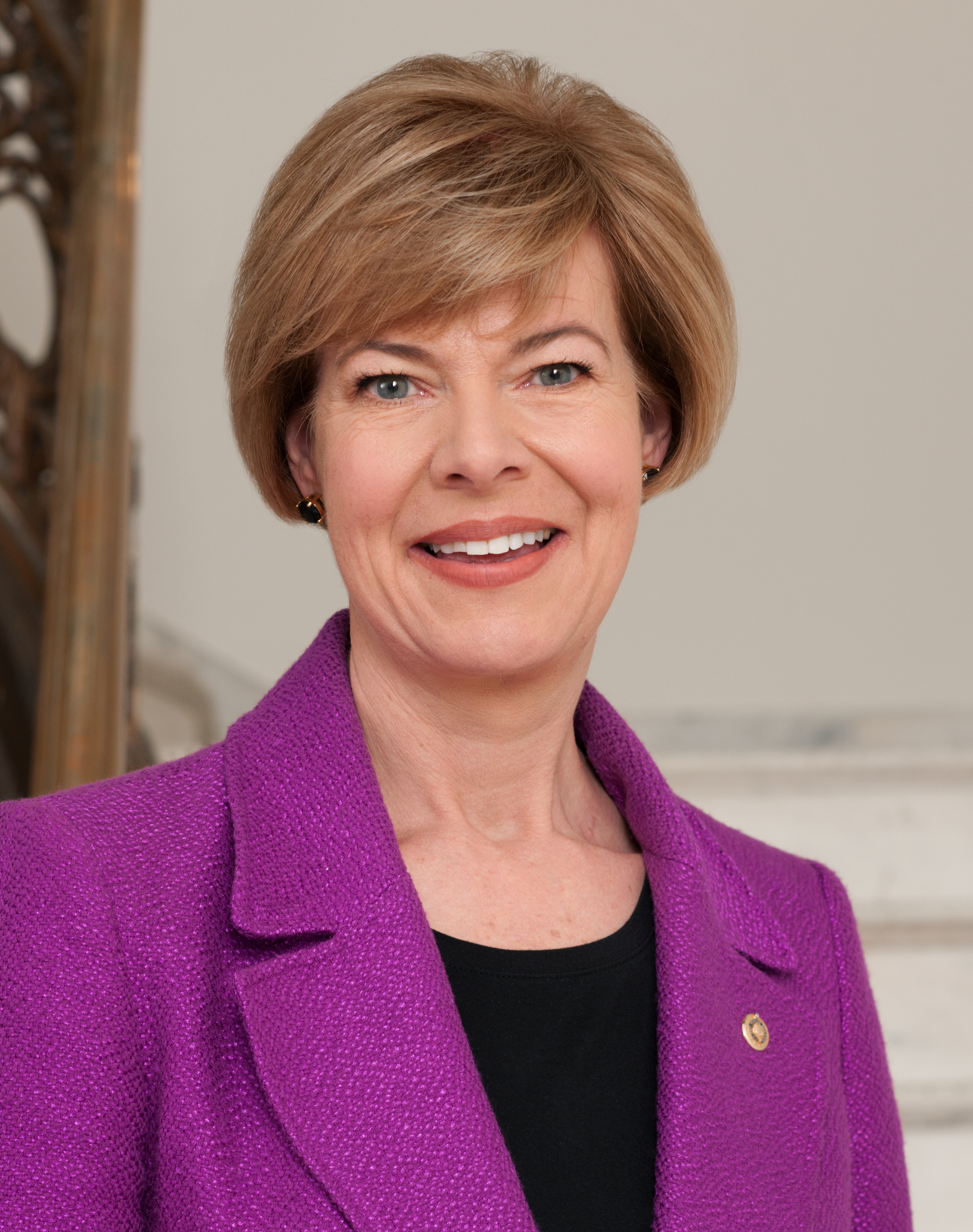
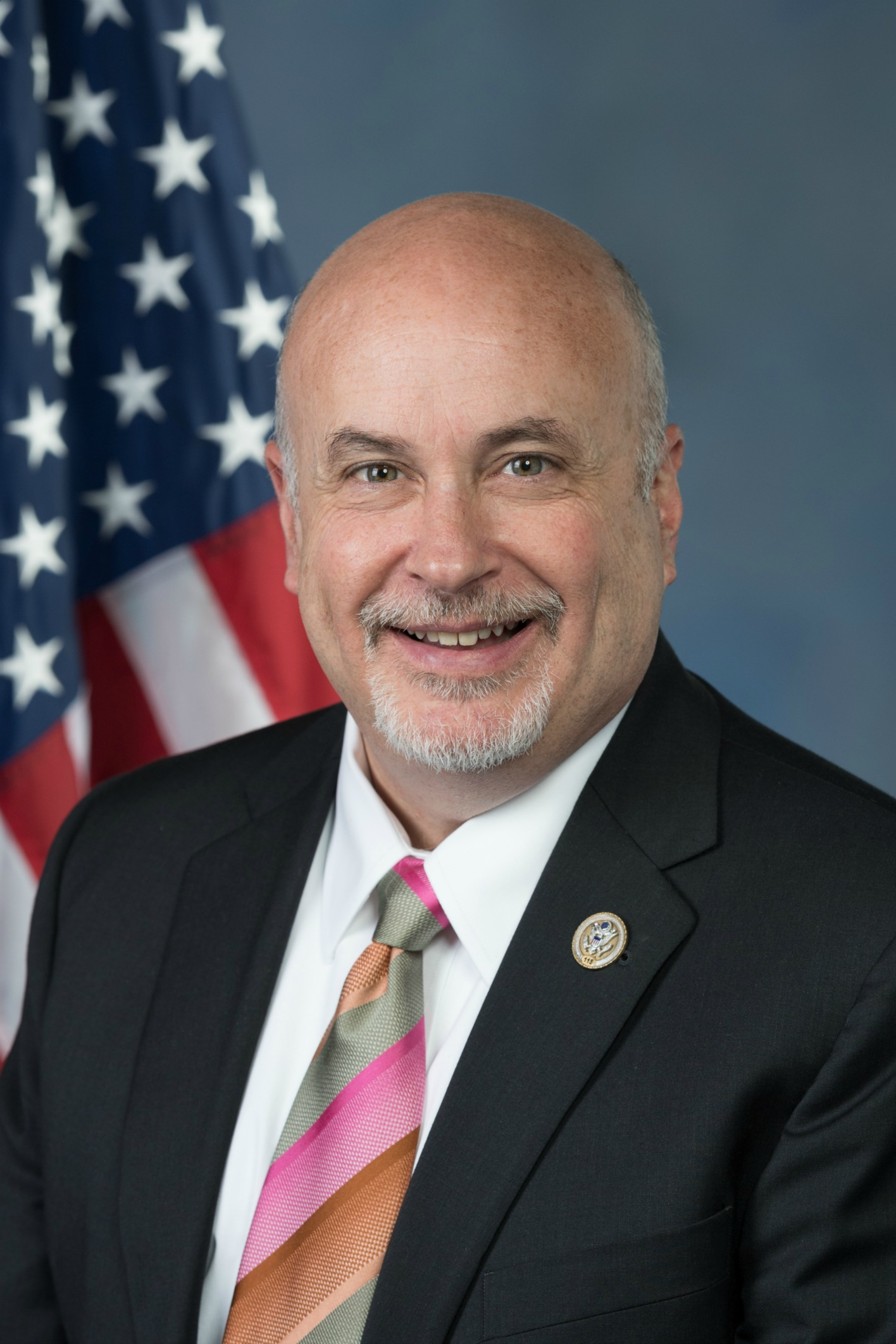
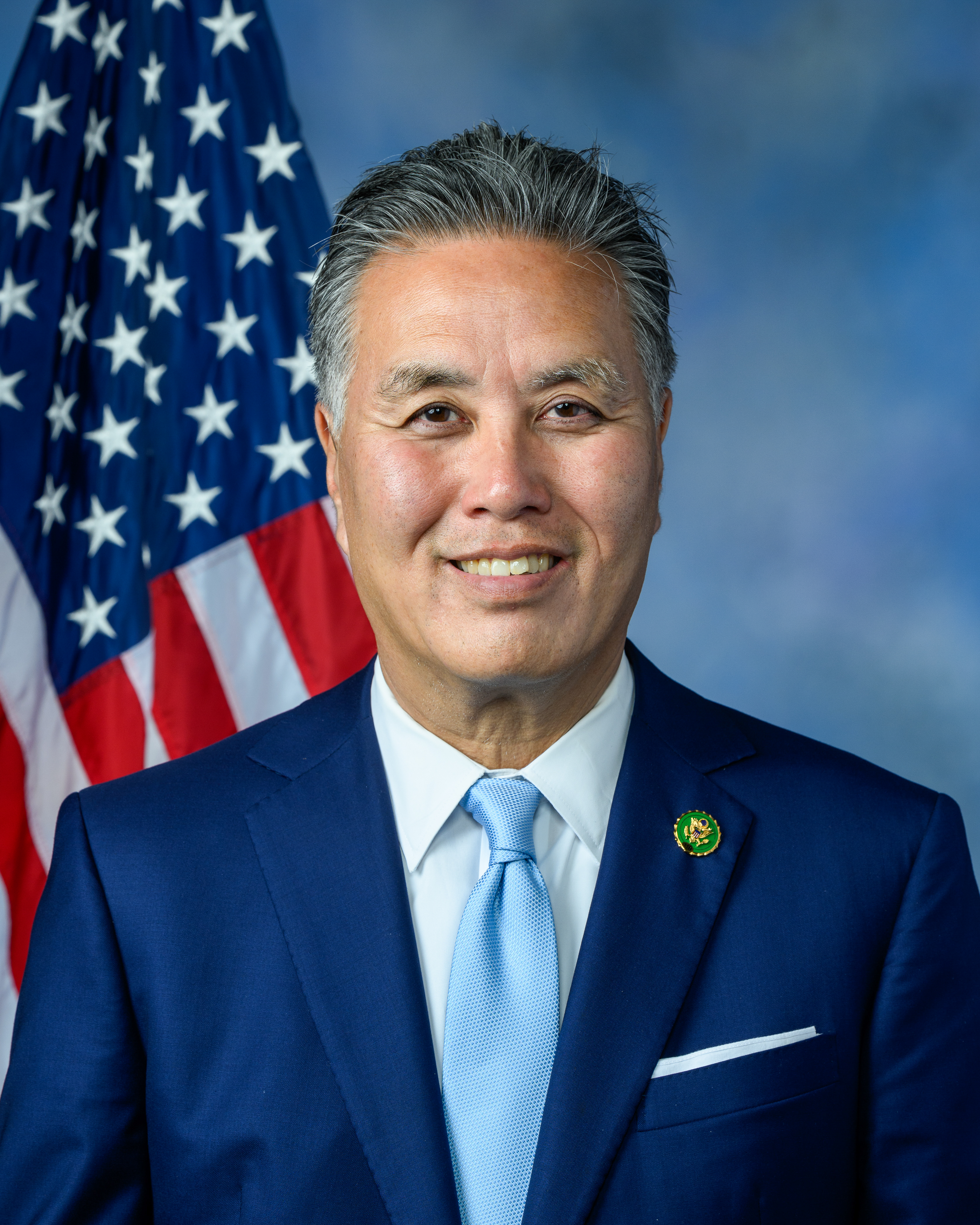
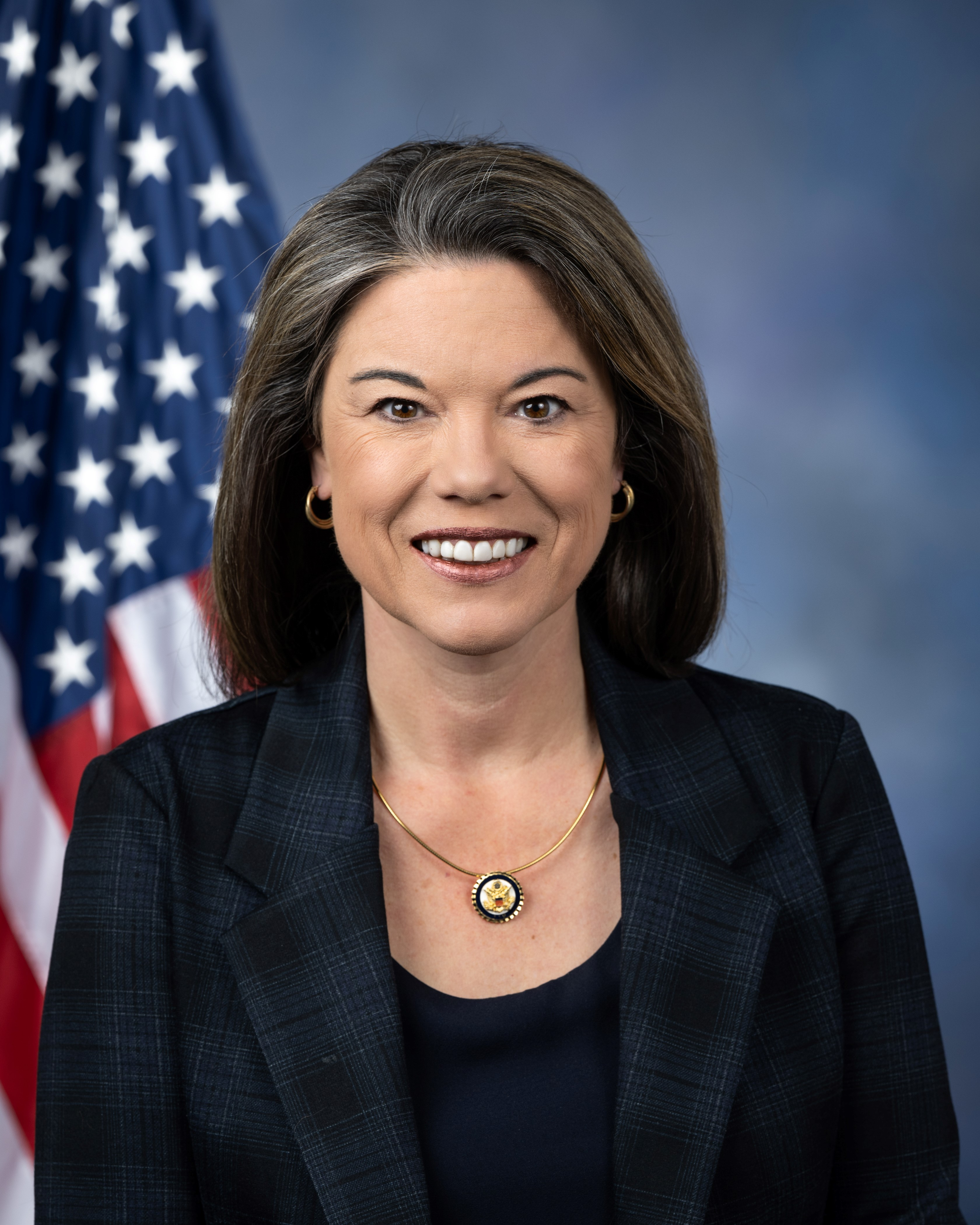
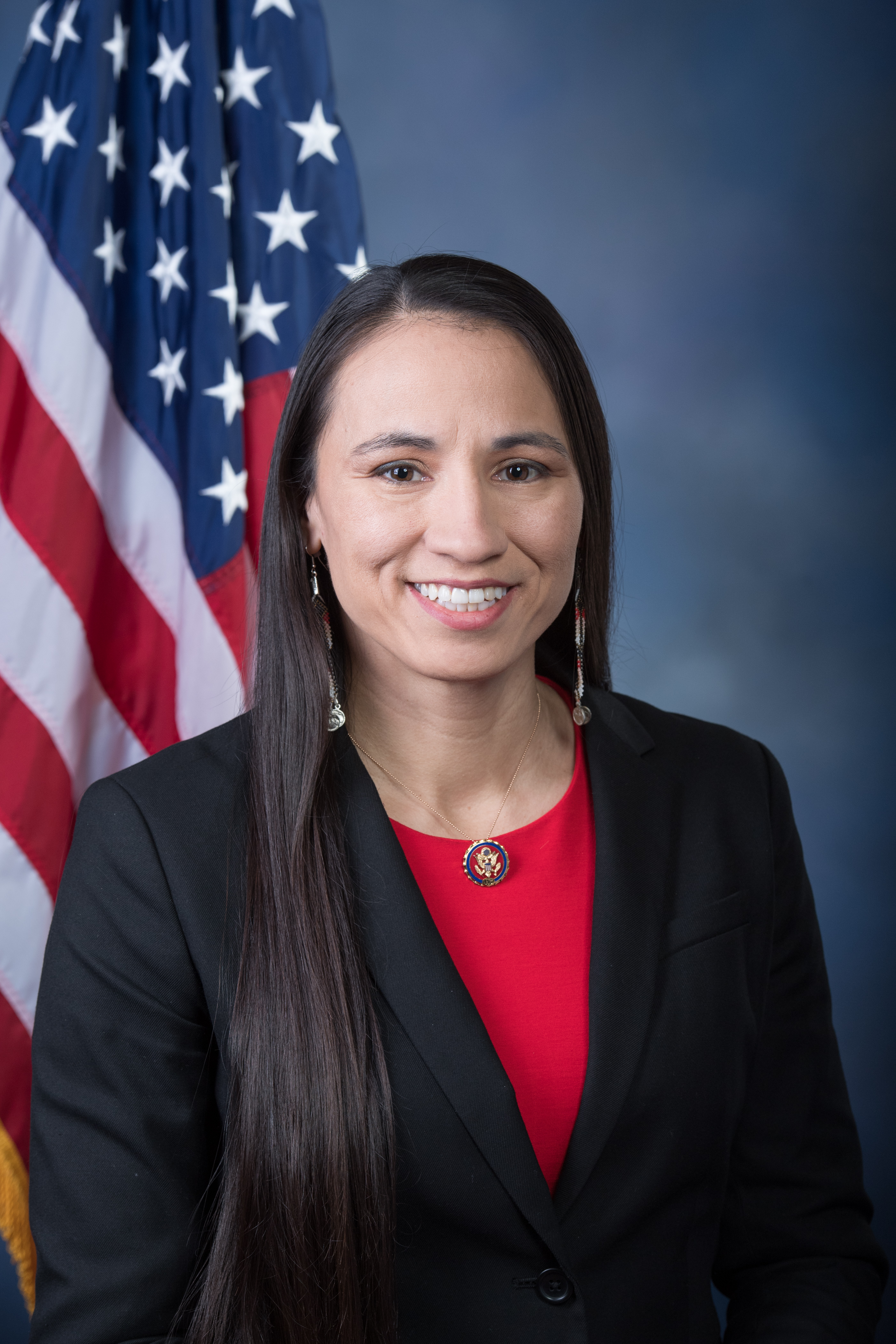
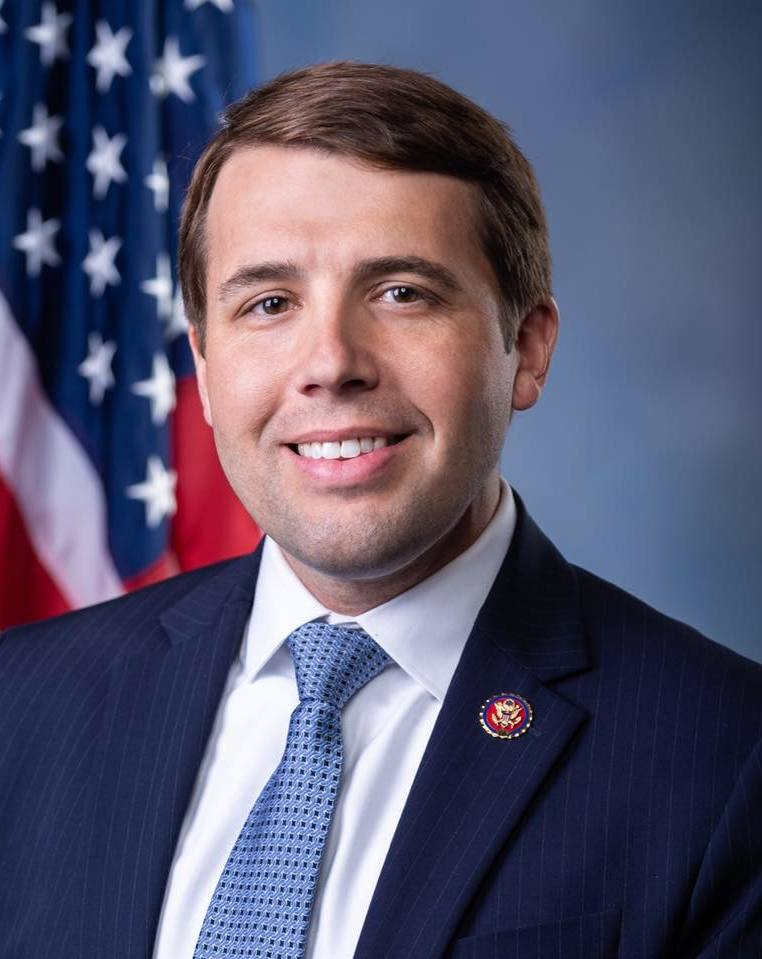
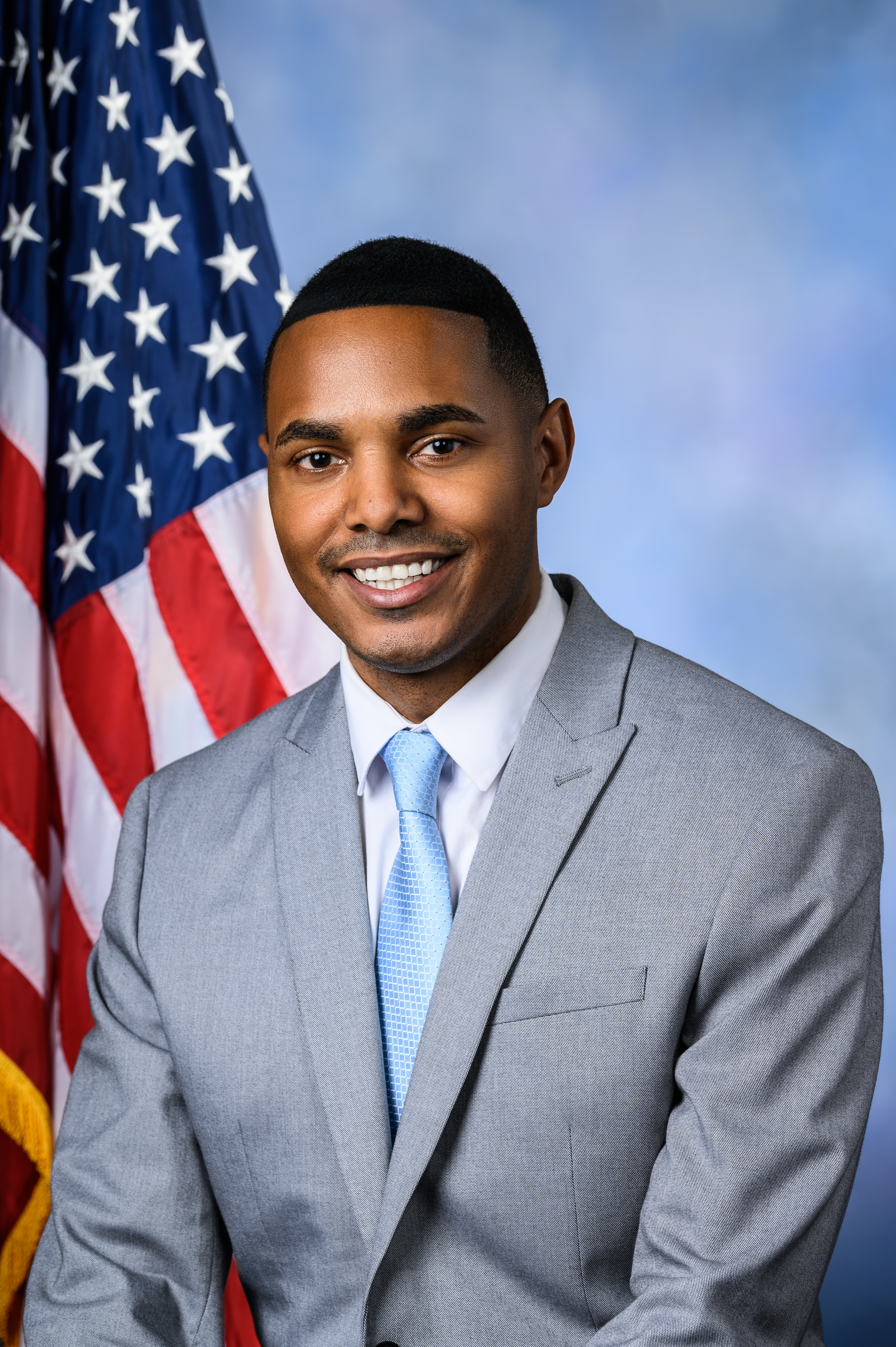
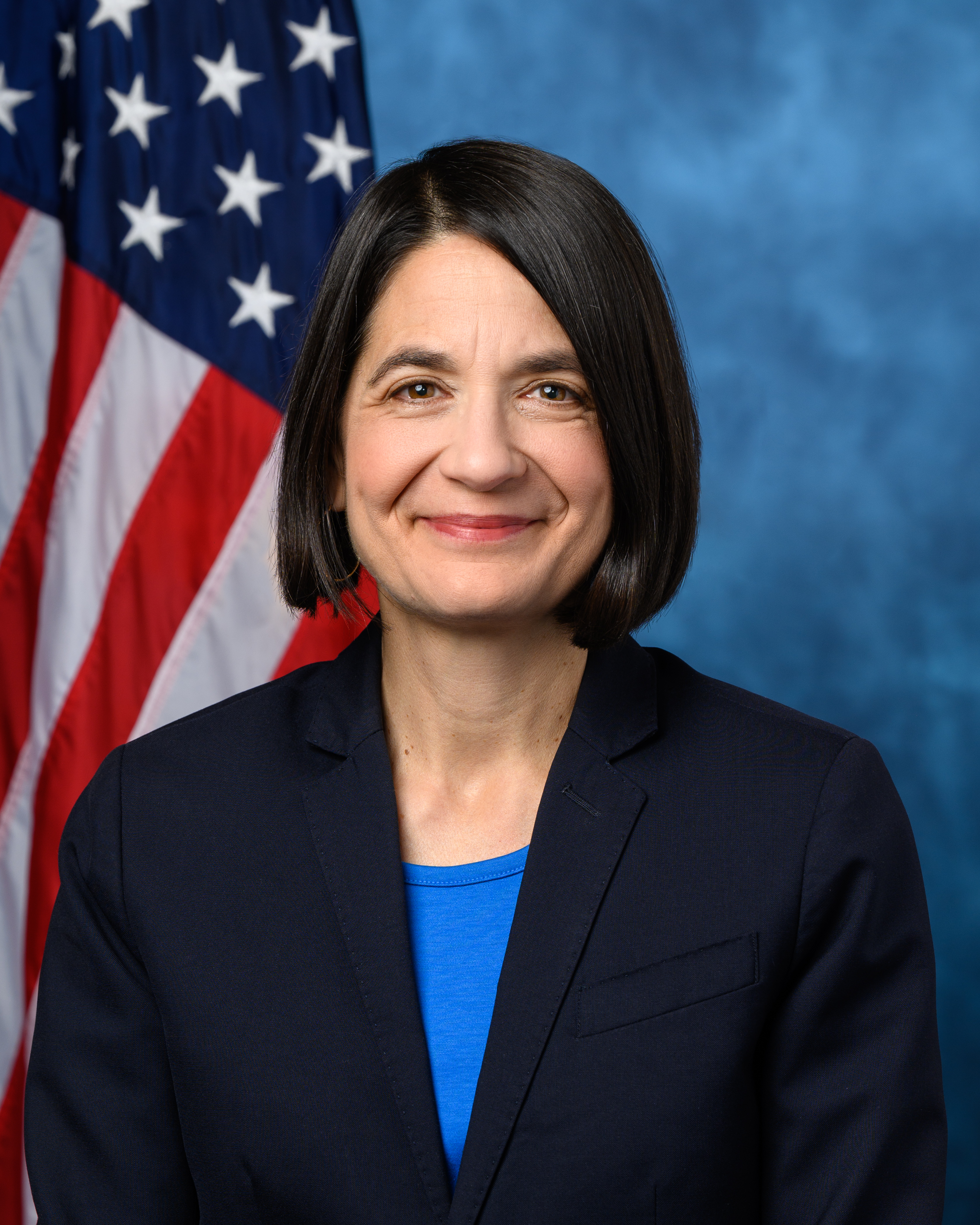
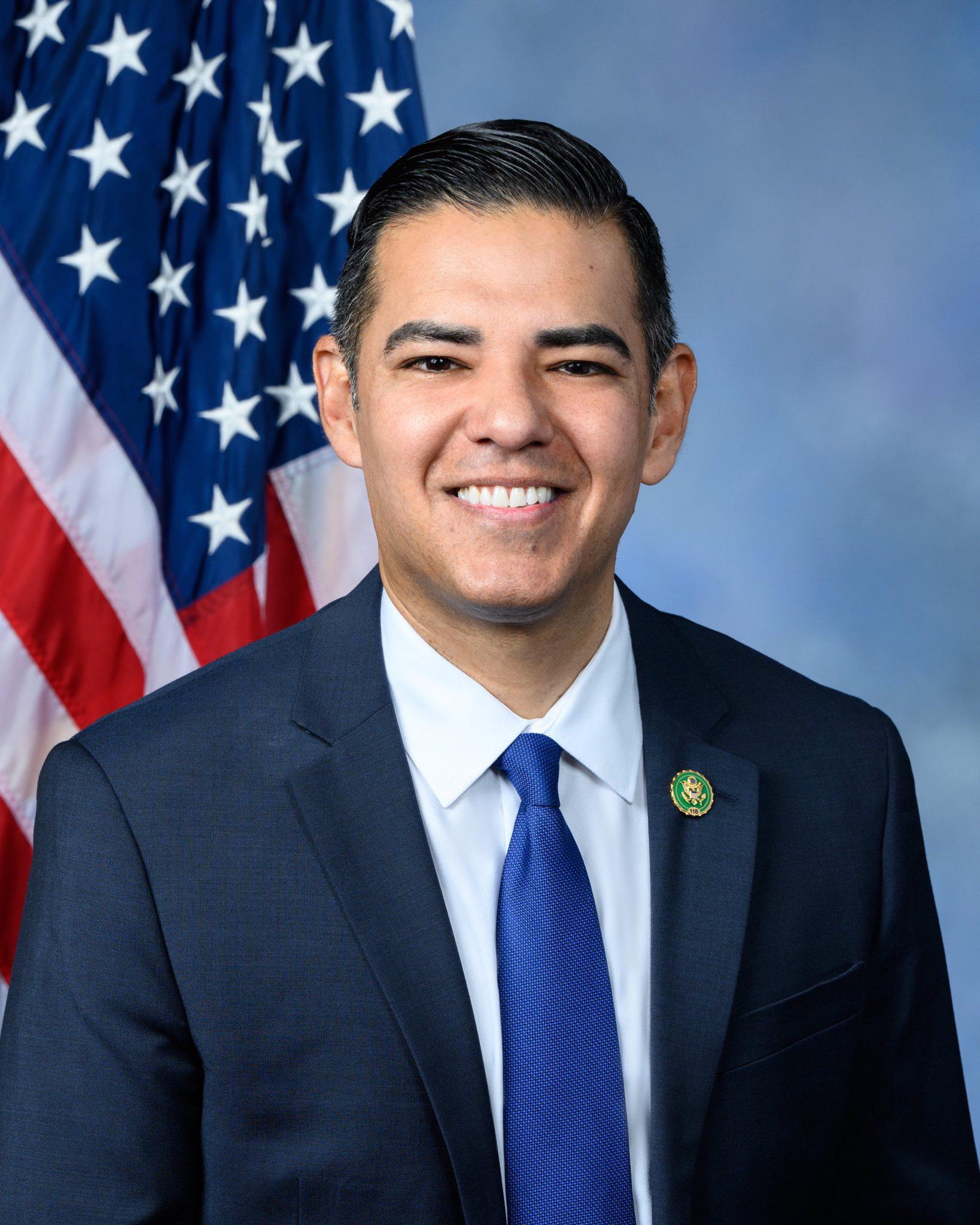
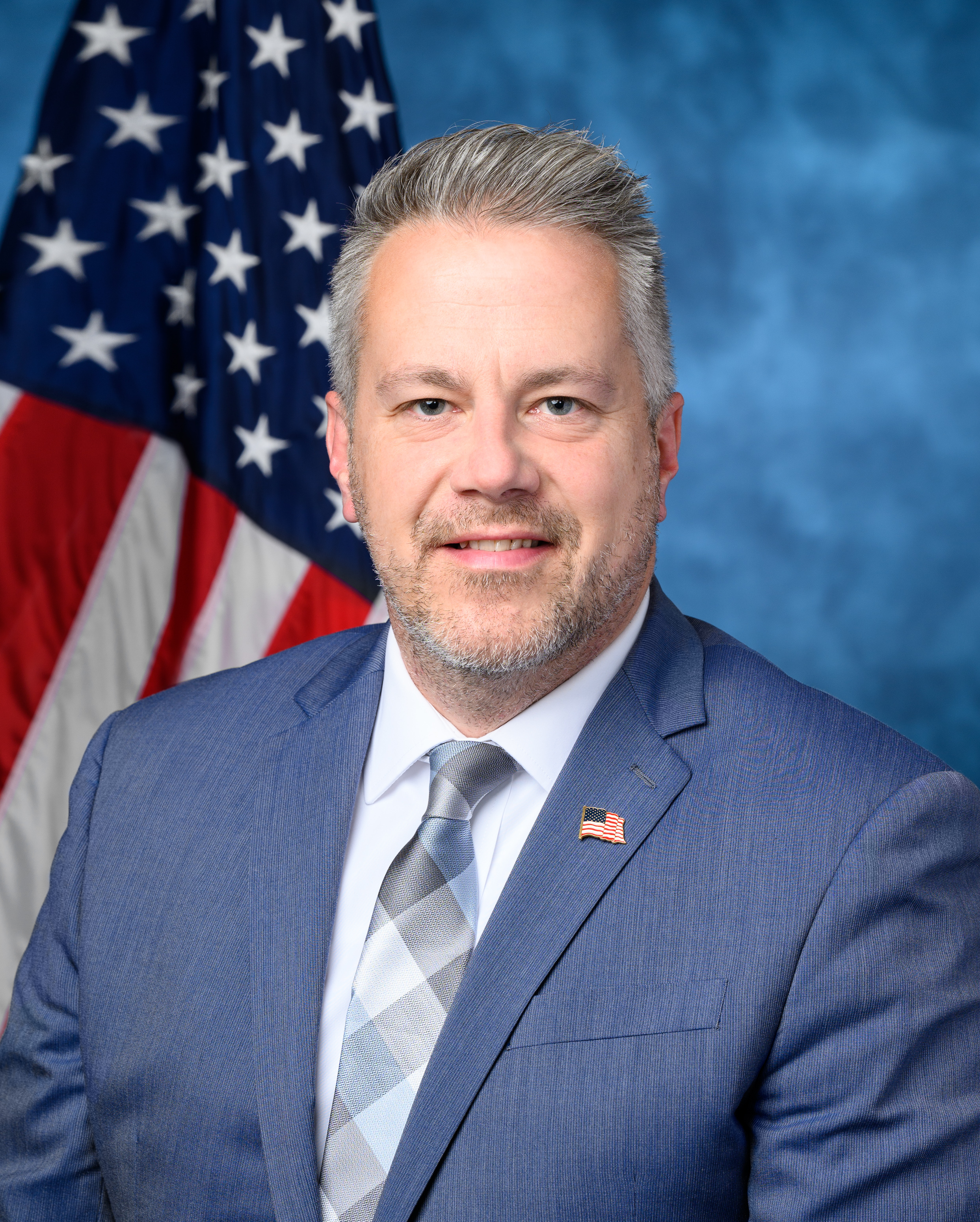
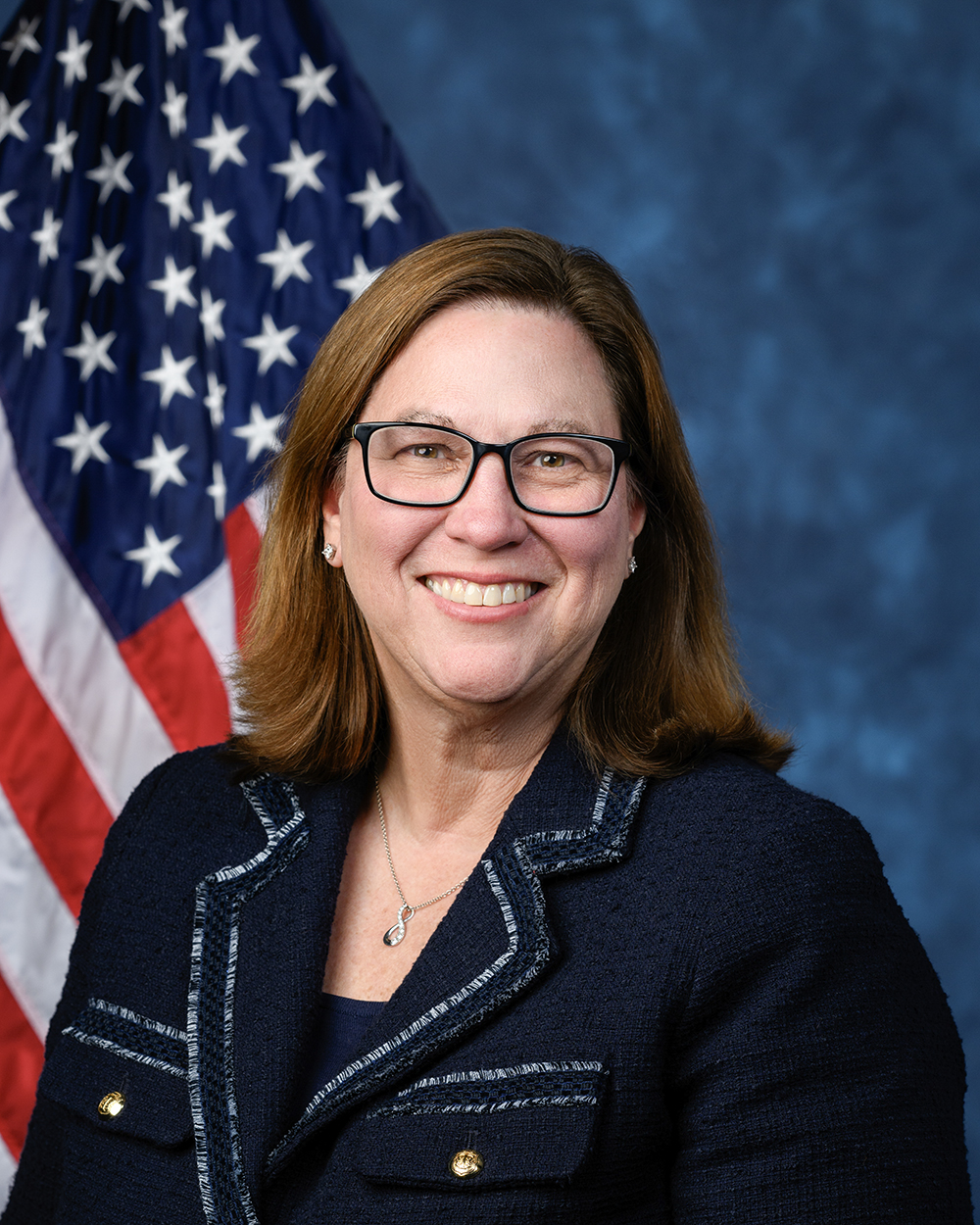
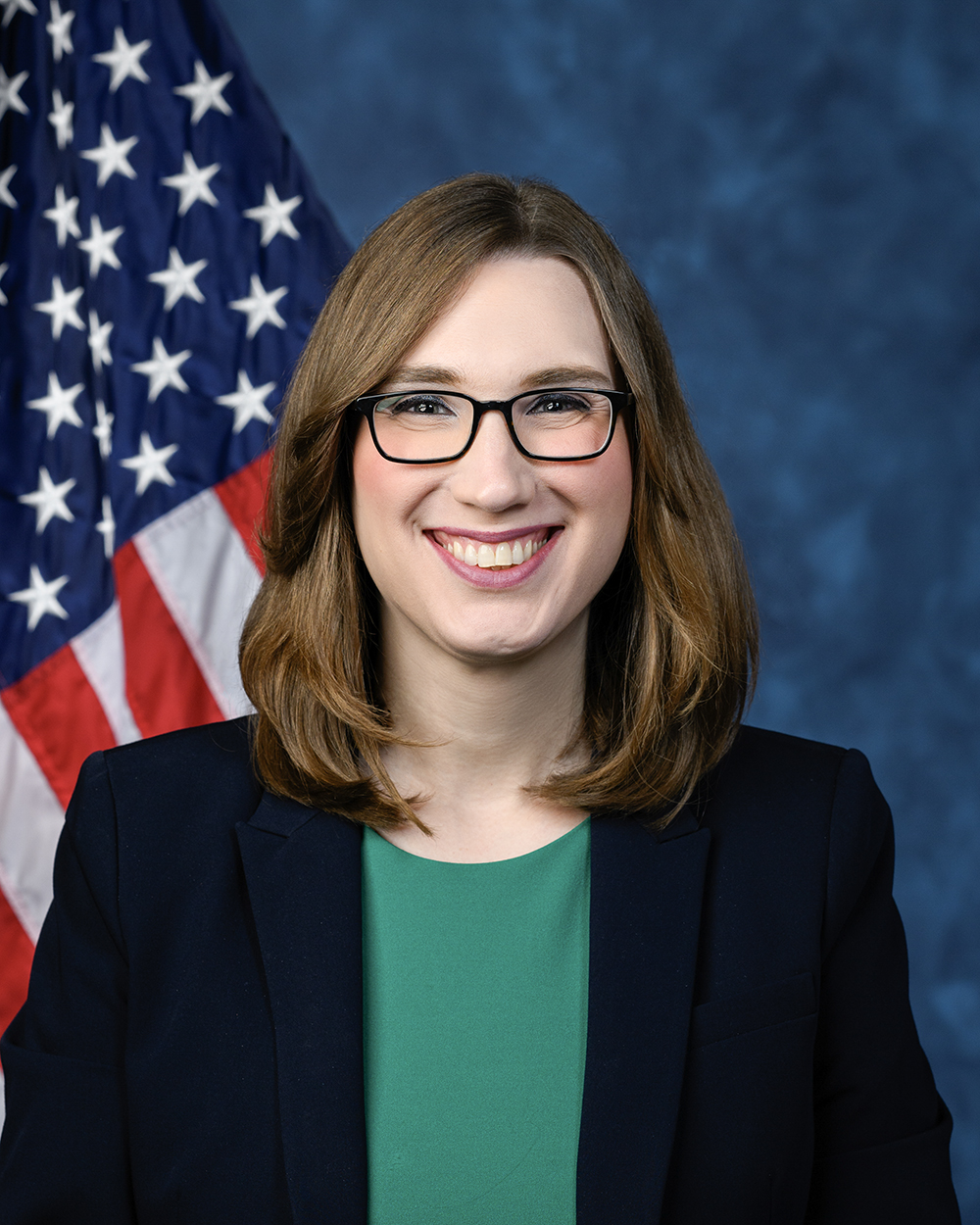
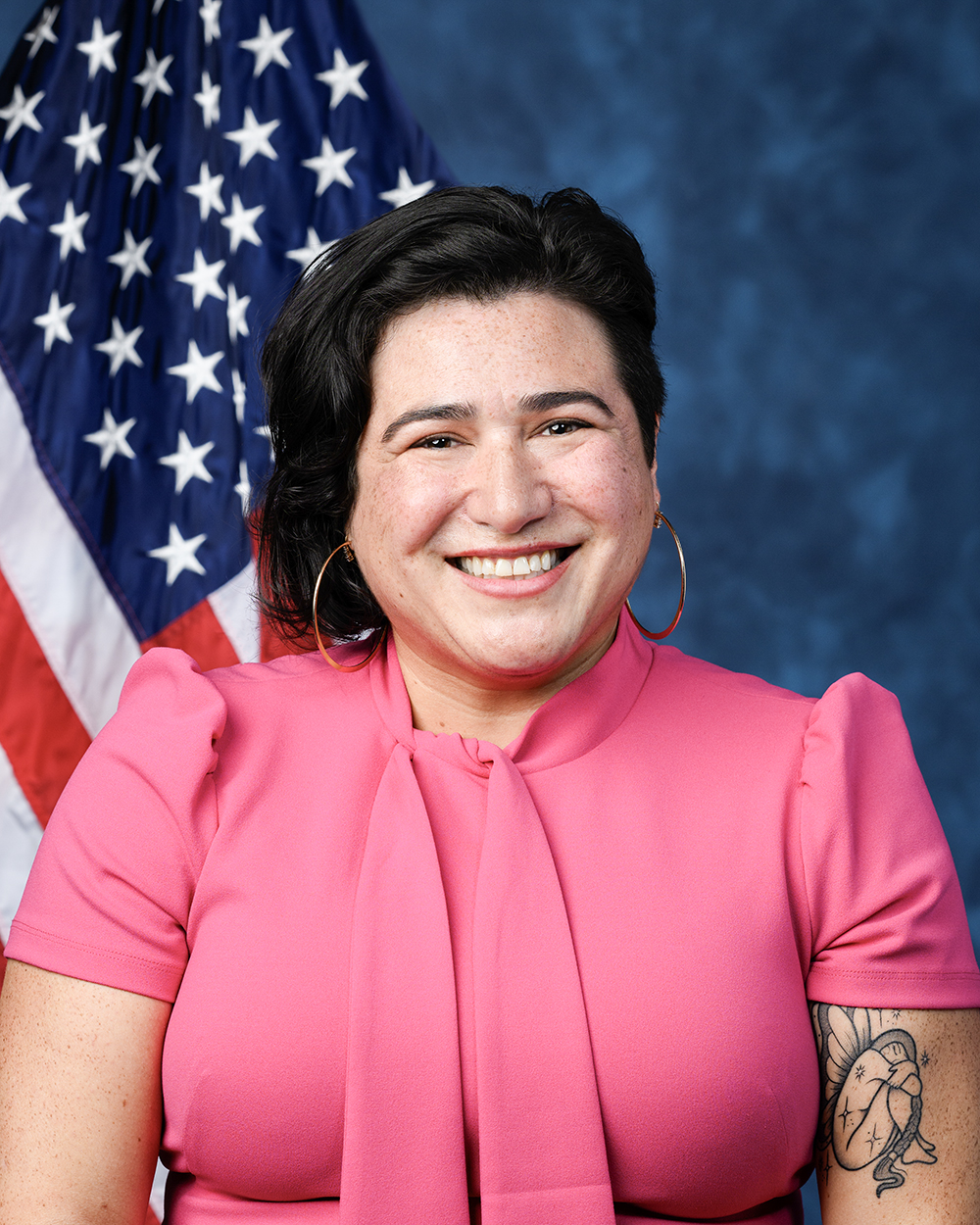
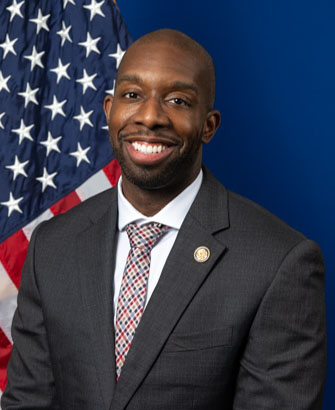
One incumbent senator and 13 representatives are LGBT: Senator Tammy Baldwin, Mark Pocan, Mark Takano, Angie Craig, Sharice Davids, Chris Pappas, Ritchie Torres, Becca Balint, Robert Garcia, Eric Sorensen, Julie Johnson, Sarah McBride, Emily Randall, and Everton Blair

As of September 2026, 38 members of the LGBTQ community are known to have held office in the United States Congress. In the House, 34 LGBTQ people held office; in the Senate, 4 held office. Two people, Tammy Baldwin and Kyrsten Sinema, served in the House and were later elected into the Senate. The earliest known LGBTQ senator is Harris Wofford, who began his term in 1991; Wofford announced his plans to marry a man over 20 years after serving in the Senate. In 2024, Sarah McBride was elected as the nation's first openly transgender member of Congress.

There are 14 openly LGBTQ members of the current (119th) Congress, all of whom are Democrats. One is a senator and the rest are House representatives. This is the record highest number of LGBTQ congresspeople openly serving at the same time in U.S. history.

== Senate ==
† Came out after serving Incumbent (currently serving)

Name	Party	State	Term			Notes
Name	Party	State	Start	End	Duration	Notes
Harris Wofford†	Democratic	Pennsylvania	May 8, 1991	Jan 3, 1995	3 years, 240 days	Announced his marriage to a man in 2016.
Tammy Baldwin	Democratic	Wisconsin	Jan 3, 2013	Incumbent	13 years, 315 days	As an openly lesbian woman, Baldwin is the first openly LGBTQ senator.
Kyrsten Sinema	Democratic (2019–2022)	Arizona	Jan 3, 2019	Jan 3, 2025	6 years, 0 days	Sinema was the first openly bisexual senator.
Kyrsten Sinema	Independent (2022–2025)	Arizona	Jan 3, 2019	Jan 3, 2025	6 years, 0 days	Sinema was the first openly bisexual senator.
Laphonza Butler	Democratic	California	Oct 3, 2023	Dec 8, 2024	1 year, 66 days	Butler is openly lesbian and was the first openly LGBTQ African-American senator.

=== Senator-elect ===
Name	Party	State	Term			Notes
Name	Party	State	Start	End	Duration	Notes
Chris Pappas	Democratic	New Hampshire	Jan 3, 2027	Elect	−50 days	First openly gay man elected to the U.S. Senate.

== House of Representatives ==
† Came out after serving ‡ Posthumously identified as LGBTQ Incumbent (currently serving)

Name	Party	State	Term			Notes
Name	Party	State	Start	End	Duration	Notes
Stewart McKinney‡	Republican	Connecticut	Jan 3, 1971	May 7, 1987	16 years, 124 days	After dying in office of AIDS-related illness, McKinney was outed as bisexual in his obituary.
Barbara Jordan‡	Democratic	Texas	Jan 3, 1973	Jan 3, 1979	6 years, 0 days	Jordan's domestic partnership with Nancy Earl was revealed in her obituary in 1996, making her the first LGBTQ woman in Congress (per the U.S. National Archives).
Gerry Studds	Democratic	Massachusetts	Jan 3, 1973	Jan 3, 1997	24 years, 0 days	Studds came out as gay as a result of his implication in the 1983 congressional page sex scandal. He became the first openly LGBTQ person to win election to Congress with his reelection in 1984.
Robert Bauman	Republican	Maryland	Aug 21, 1973	Jan 3, 1981	7 years, 135 days	Bauman was outed as gay in October 1980 while in office, making him the first openly LGBTQ member of Congress.
Pete Kostmayer†	Democratic	Pennsylvania	Jan 3, 1977	Jan 3, 1981	14 years, 0 days	Announced in 2025 his 2021 marriage to a man.
Pete Kostmayer†	Democratic	Pennsylvania	Jan 3, 1983	Jan 3, 1993	14 years, 0 days	Announced in 2025 his 2021 marriage to a man.
Jon Hinson	Republican	Mississippi	Jan 3, 1979	Apr 13, 1981	2 years, 100 days	Hinson was outed as gay after being arrested on a charge of oral sodomy on February 4, 1981.
Barney Frank	Democratic	Massachusetts	Jan 3, 1981	Jan 3, 2013	32 years, 0 days	Frank came out as gay in 1987 and in 2012 became the first member of Congress in a same-sex marriage.
Steve Gunderson	Republican	Wisconsin	Jan 3, 1981	Jan 3, 1997	16 years, 0 days	Gunderson was outed as gay on the floor of the House in 1994, Gunderson was the first openly gay Republican to be reelected after being outed.
Jim Kolbe	Republican	Arizona	Jan 3, 1985	Jan 3, 2007	22 years, 0 days	Kolbe came out as gay while in office after voting for the Defense of Marriage Act in 1996. He was the first openly gay person to address the Republican National Convention.
Michael Huffington†	Republican	California	Jan 3, 1993	Jan 3, 1995	2 years, 0 days	Huffington came out as bisexual in 1998
Mark Foley†	Republican	Florida	Jan 3, 1995	Sep 29, 2006	11 years, 269 days	Foley came out as gay after being implicated in a 2006 congressional page scandal.
Tammy Baldwin	Democratic	Wisconsin	Jan 3, 1999	Jan 3, 2013	14 years, 0 days	Baldwin is openly lesbian, and was the first openly LGBTQ non-incumbent elected to Congress.
Mike Michaud	Democratic	Maine	Jan 3, 2003	Jan 3, 2015	12 years, 0 days	Michaud came out as gay in 2013.
Jared Polis	Democratic	Colorado	Jan 3, 2009	Jan 3, 2019	10 years, 0 days	In 2011, Polis became the first same-sex parent in Congress.
Aaron Schock†	Republican	Illinois	Jan 3, 2009	Mar 31, 2015	6 years, 87 days	Schock came out as gay in 2020.
David Cicilline	Democratic	Rhode Island	Jan 3, 2011	May 31, 2023	12 years, 148 days	Cicilline is openly gay.
Sean Patrick Maloney	Democratic	New York	Jan 3, 2013	Jan 3, 2023	10 years, 0 days	Maloney is openly gay. In 2014, he married his longtime partner.
Mark Pocan	Democratic	Wisconsin	Jan 3, 2013	Incumbent	13 years, 315 days	Pocan is openly gay and the first LGBTQ member of Congress to replace another LGBTQ member of Congress (Tammy Baldwin) and the first non-incumbent in a same-sex marriage elected to Congress.
Kyrsten Sinema	Democratic	Arizona	Jan 3, 2013	Jan 3, 2019	6 years, 0 days	Sinema was the first openly bisexual member of Congress.
Mark Takano	Democratic	California	Jan 3, 2013	Incumbent	13 years, 315 days	Takano is openly gay and the first openly LGBTQ person of color (specifically Asian American) elected to Congress.
Angie Craig	Democratic	Minnesota	Jan 3, 2019	Jan 3, 2027	7 years, 315 days	Craig is openly lesbian and the first non-incumbent LGBTQ parent elected to Congress.
Sharice Davids	Democratic	Kansas	Jan 3, 2019	Incumbent	7 years, 315 days	Davids is openly lesbian and the first openly LGBTQ woman of color (Native American) elected to Congress.
Katie Hill	Democratic	California	Jan 3, 2019	Nov 1, 2019	302 days	Hill is openly bisexual.
Chris Pappas	Democratic	New Hampshire	Jan 3, 2019	Jan 3, 2027	7 years, 315 days	Pappas is openly gay.
Mondaire Jones	Democratic	New York	Jan 3, 2021	Jan 3, 2023	2 years, 0 days	Along with Ritchie Torres, Jones was the first openly gay African American elected to Congress.
Ritchie Torres	Democratic	New York	Jan 3, 2021	Incumbent	5 years, 315 days	Along with Mondaire Jones, Torres was the first openly gay African American elected to Congress, and the first openly gay Hispanic member of Congress.
Becca Balint	Democratic	Vermont	Jan 3, 2023	Incumbent	3 years, 315 days	Balint is openly lesbian.
Robert Garcia	Democratic	California	Jan 3, 2023	Incumbent	3 years, 315 days	Garcia is openly gay.
George Santos	Republican	New York	Jan 3, 2023	Dec 1, 2023	332 days	Santos is openly gay and the first openly LGBTQ non-incumbent Republican elected to Congress. (Note: Incidentally, this also marked the first election in which both major party candidates (Santos and Democrat Rob Zimmerman) were openly LGBTQ.)
Eric Sorensen	Democratic	Illinois	Jan 3, 2023	Incumbent	3 years, 315 days	Sorensen is openly gay.
Julie Johnson	Democratic	Texas	Jan 3, 2025	Incumbent	1 year, 315 days	Johnson is openly lesbian and the first openly LGBTQ individual to represent a southern state in Congress.
Sarah McBride	Democratic	Delaware	Jan 3, 2025	Incumbent	1 year, 315 days	McBride is the first openly transgender individual elected to Congress.
Emily Randall	Democratic	Washington	Jan 3, 2025	Incumbent	1 year, 315 days	Randall is the first openly LGBTQ Hispanic woman elected to Congress.
Everton Blair	Democratic	Georgia	Sep 1, 2026	Jan 3, 2027	74 days	Blair is openly gay.

=== Representatives-elect ===
Name	Party	State	Term			Notes
Name	Party	State	Start	End	Duration	Notes
Victoria Broderick	Democratic	Tennessee	Jan 3, 2027	Elect	−50 days	Openly queer.
Cait Conley	Democratic	New York	Jan 3, 2027	Elect	−50 days	Openly lesbian.
J. D. Ford	Democratic	Indiana	Jan 3, 2027	Elect	−50 days	Openly gay.
JoAnna Mendoza	Democratic	Arizona	Jan 3, 2027	Elect	−50 days	Openly bisexual.
Jeremy Moss	Democratic	Michigan	Jan 3, 2027	Elect	−50 days	Openly gay.
Marni von Wilpert	Democratic	California	Jan 3, 2027	Elect	−50 days	Openly bisexual.
Scott Wiener	Democratic	California	Jan 3, 2027	Elect	−50 days	Openly gay.

=== Delegates ===
==== Delegates-elect ====
Name	Party	State	Term			Notes
Name	Party	State	Start	End	Duration	Notes
Janelle Sarauw	Democratic	U.S. Virgin Islands	Jan 3, 2027	Elect	−50 days	Openly lesbian.

=== Shadow representatives ===
Name	Party	Jurisdiction	Term			Notes
Name	Party	Jurisdiction	Start	End	Duration	Notes
Sabrina Sojourner	Democratic	District of Columbia	Jan 3, 1997	Jan 3, 1999	2 years, 0 days	Sojourner came out as lesbian in 1976.

== Histograph of openly-serving LGBTQ members of Congress ==
Starting	House		Senate		Total	Event
Starting	Number	Graph	Number	Graph	Total	Event
March 4, 1789	0		0		0	United States Congress established
October 3, 1980	1		0		1	▲ Robert Bauman outed
January 3, 1981	0		0		0	▼ Robert Bauman lost reelection
February 4, 1981	1		0		1	▲ Jon Hinson outed
April 13, 1981	0		0		0	▼ Jon Hinson resigned
July 14, 1983	1		0		1	▲ Gerry Studds comes out
May 29, 1987	2		0		2	▲ Barney Frank comes out
March 24, 1994	3		0		3	▲ Steve Gunderson outed
August 1, 1996	4		0		4	▲ Jim Kolbe comes out
January 3, 1997	2		0		2	▼ Gerry Studds and Steve Gunderson retired
January 3, 1999	3		0		3	▲ Tammy Baldwin elected to the House
January 3, 2007	2		0		2	▼ Jim Kolbe retired
January 3, 2009	3		0		3	▲ Jared Polis elected
January 3, 2011	4		0		4	▲ David Cicilline elected
January 3, 2013	6		1		7	▲ Tammy Baldwin retired from the House, elected to the Senate; Sean Patrick Maloney, Mark Pocan, Kyrsten Sinema, and Mark Takano elected; Barney Frank retired
November 4, 2013	7		1		8	▲ Mike Michaud comes out
January 3, 2015	6		1		7	▼ Mike Michaud retired
January 3, 2019	8		2		10	▲ Kyrsten Sinema retired from the House, elected to the Senate; Angie Craig, Sharice Davids, Katie Hill, and Chris Pappas elected; Jared Polis retired
November 1, 2019	7		2		9	▼ Katie Hill resigned
January 3, 2021	9		2		11	▲ Mondaire Jones and Ritchie Torres elected
December 9, 2022	9		2		11	Kyrsten Sinema registered as an independent
January 3, 2023	11		2		13	▲ Becca Balint, Robert Garcia, George Santos, and Eric Sorensen elected; Mondaire Jones lost renomination; Sean Patrick Maloney lost reelection
June 1, 2023	10		2		12	▼ David Cicilline resigned
October 4, 2023	10		3		13	▲ Laphonza Butler appointed
December 1, 2023	9		3		12	▼ George Santos expelled
December 8, 2024	9		2		11	▼ Laphonza Butler resigned
January 3, 2025	12		1		13	▲ Julie Johnson, Sarah McBride, and Emily Randall elected; Kyrsten Sinema retired
September 1, 2026	13		1		14	▲ Everton Blair elected

Democratic Party
Republican Party
Independent

== See also ==
- Congressional Equality Caucus
- List of LGBTQ politicians in the United States
- List of first openly LGBTQ politicians in the United States
- List of transgender public officeholders in the United States
