= Eric Sorensen (politician) =

American politician (born 1976)

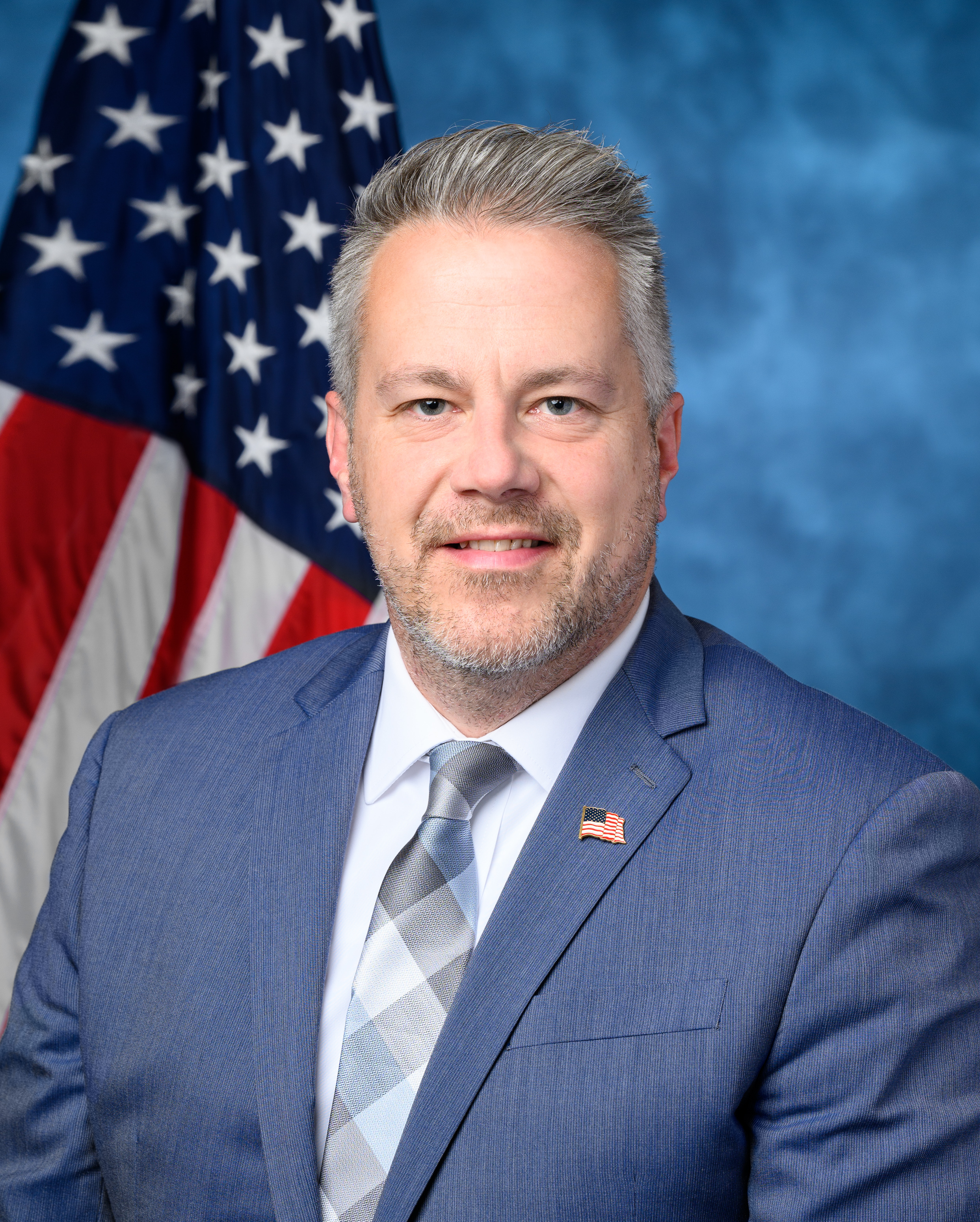
- Official portrait, 2022

Member of the U.S. House of Representatives from Illinois's 17th district
- Incumbent
- Assumed office January 3, 2023
- Preceded by: Cheri Bustos

Personal details
- Born: March 18, 1976 (age 50) Rockford, Illinois, U.S.
- Party: Democratic
- Education: Northern Illinois University (BS)
- Website: House website Campaign website

Eric Sorensen (/ˈsɔːrənsən/ SOR-ən-sən; born March 18, 1976) is an American politician and meteorologist serving as the U.S. representative for Illinois's 17th congressional district since 2023. His district covers a large swath of western and central Illinois, centered around Moline, Rock Island, and the Illinois side of the Quad Cities. It also includes parts of Peoria and Rockford. A member of the Democratic Party, Sorensen is the first openly gay member of Congress from Illinois.

Before entering politics, Sorensen worked for more than two decades as a television meteorologist in Texas and Illinois, including at WREX in Rockford and WQAD in Moline, and he is the only meteorologist serving in Congress. He is won a third term in 2026.

== Early life and career ==
Sorensen was born in Rockford, Illinois. He graduated from Boylan Catholic High School and then studied communications and meteorology at Northern Illinois University.

Sorensen began his career as a meteorologist at KTRE, the ABC affiliate in Lufkin, Texas, from 1999 to 2000 before moving to Tyler, Texas, where he was the morning meteorologist for East Texas News Daybreak, which aired on both KLTV and KTRE-TV. He worked as chief meteorologist for WREX, Rockford's NBC affiliate, from 2003 to 2014, before becoming the senior meteorologist for WQAD, the ABC affiliate of Moline, Illinois. Sorensen became a fellow of the Society for Environmental Journalists in 2018.

Sorensen retired from television in 2021. Afterwards, he took a job in communications for UnityPoint Health before announcing his run for Congress.

== U.S. House of Representatives ==
=== Elections ===
==== 2022 ====
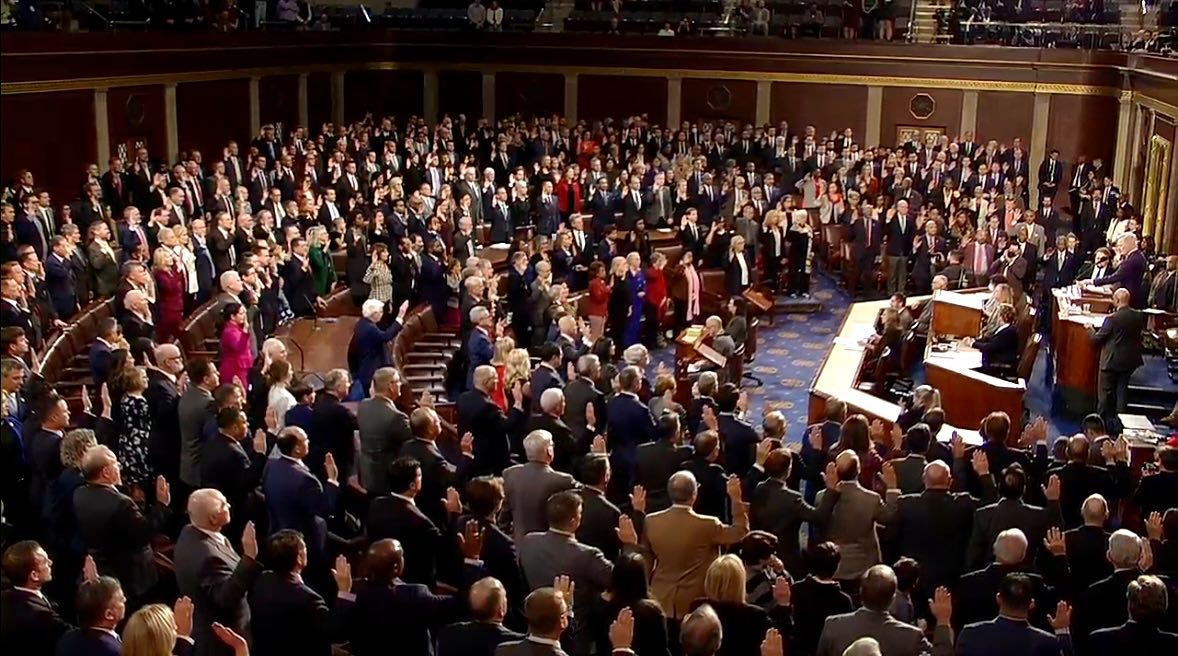
Sorensen being sworn in with the 118th Congress, 2023

With Cheri Bustos not seeking re-election, Sorensen declared his candidacy for the United States House of Representatives for Illinois's 17th congressional district in the 2022 elections on November 10, 2021, as a member of the Democratic Party. He defeated Esther Joy King, the Republican nominee, in the November 8, 2022, general election. Upon taking office in January 2023, Sorensen became only the second Democrat since 1927 to represent a significant portion of Peoria, and the second since the 1850s to represent a significant portion of Rockford.

==== 2024 ====
In the 2024 election, Sorensen defeated Republican nominee Joseph McGraw with 54.4% of the vote.

=== Tenure ===
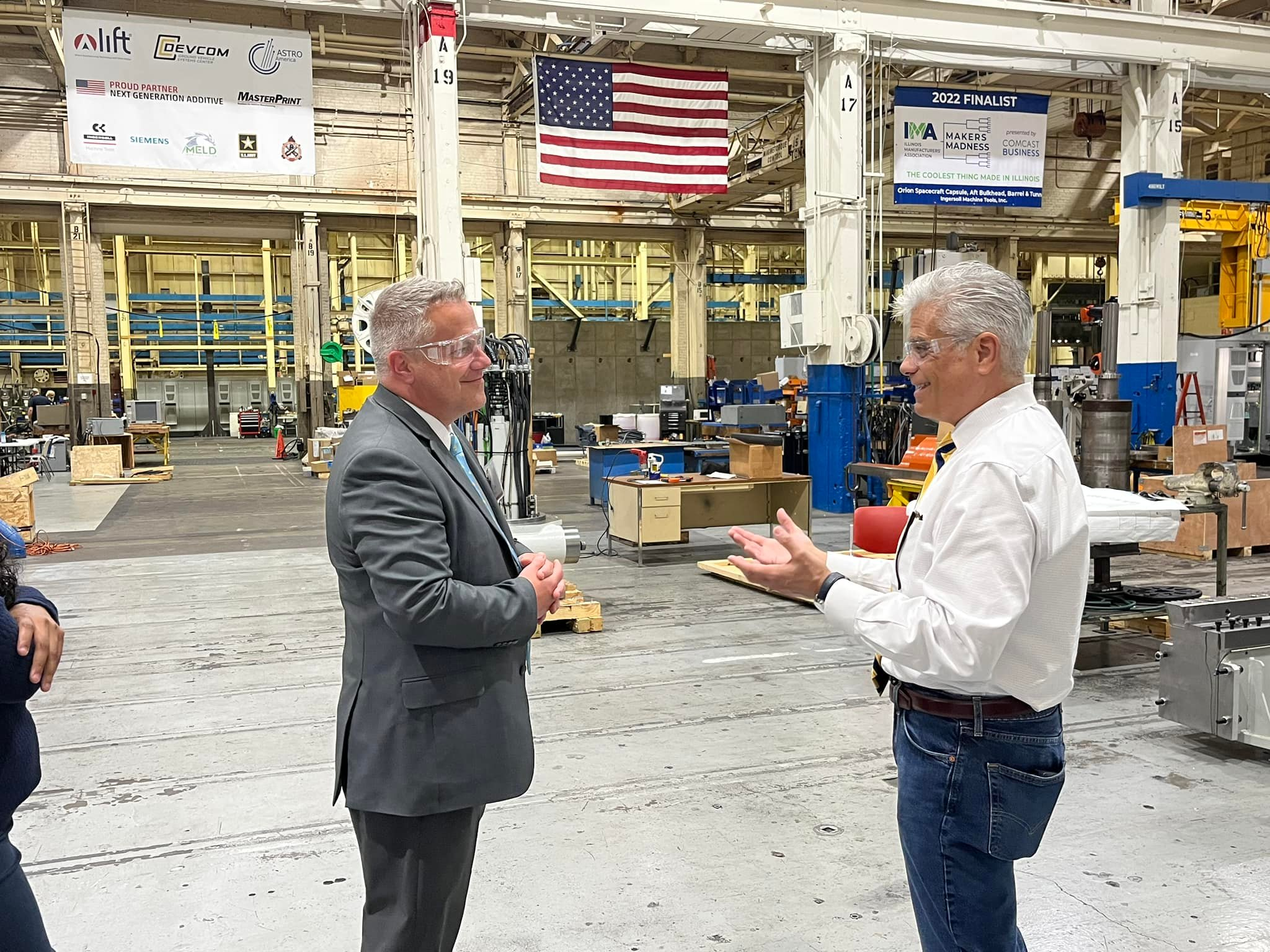
Sorensen visits Ingersoll Machine Tools in Rockford to show support for manufacturing in his district, 2023

Sorensen was sworn into office on January 7, 2023, as the U.S. representative for Illinois’s 17th congressional district. During the 118th Congress, he was appointed to the Agriculture and Science, Space, and Technology committees. In May of his first year, Sorensen introduced the Stop Games Act, legislation aimed at lowering drug costs by allowing the FDA to reject fake citizen petitions used by pharmaceutical companies to delay approval of generic drugs. In July, he secured the inclusion of $4.6 million for six Central Illinois infrastructure projects, ranging from flood mitigation to housing and water system upgrades, in two appropriations bills. In October, he co-introduced the bipartisan Upper Mississippi River Levee Safety Act to give local levee districts more flexibility in managing flood protections along the Mississippi River.

In March 2024, Sorensen secured $123 million for western Illinois infrastructure projects, including water main repairs, road improvements, and river navigation upgrades. In April, he co-introduced the bipartisan ONSHORE Act to help communities attract manufacturing investment by establishing a federal grant program to prepare undeveloped sites for strategically important industries. In 2025, Sorensen was one of 46 House Democrats who joined all Republicans to vote for the Laken Riley Act.

At an April 2026 Armed Services Committee hearing, Sorensen questioned Defense Secretary Pete Hegseth about plans to cut 150 civilian jobs at the Rock Island Arsenal, which he said amounted to 58% of the Joint Munitions Command positions there. He also asked about the department's termination of most of its union contracts. In June 2026, Sorensen voted for a war powers resolution directing an end to U.S. military involvement in the war with Iran, citing fuel costs for his constituents and farmers. He supported the 21st Century ROAD to Housing Act.

In July 2026, Sorensen and Representative Mike Flood of Nebraska launched the bipartisan Weather Enterprise Caucus to inform members about weather forecasting and research. The only meteorologist in Congress, Sorensen has introduced bills to restore National Weather Service staffing and to create an independent board to investigate major weather disasters.

=== Committee assignments ===
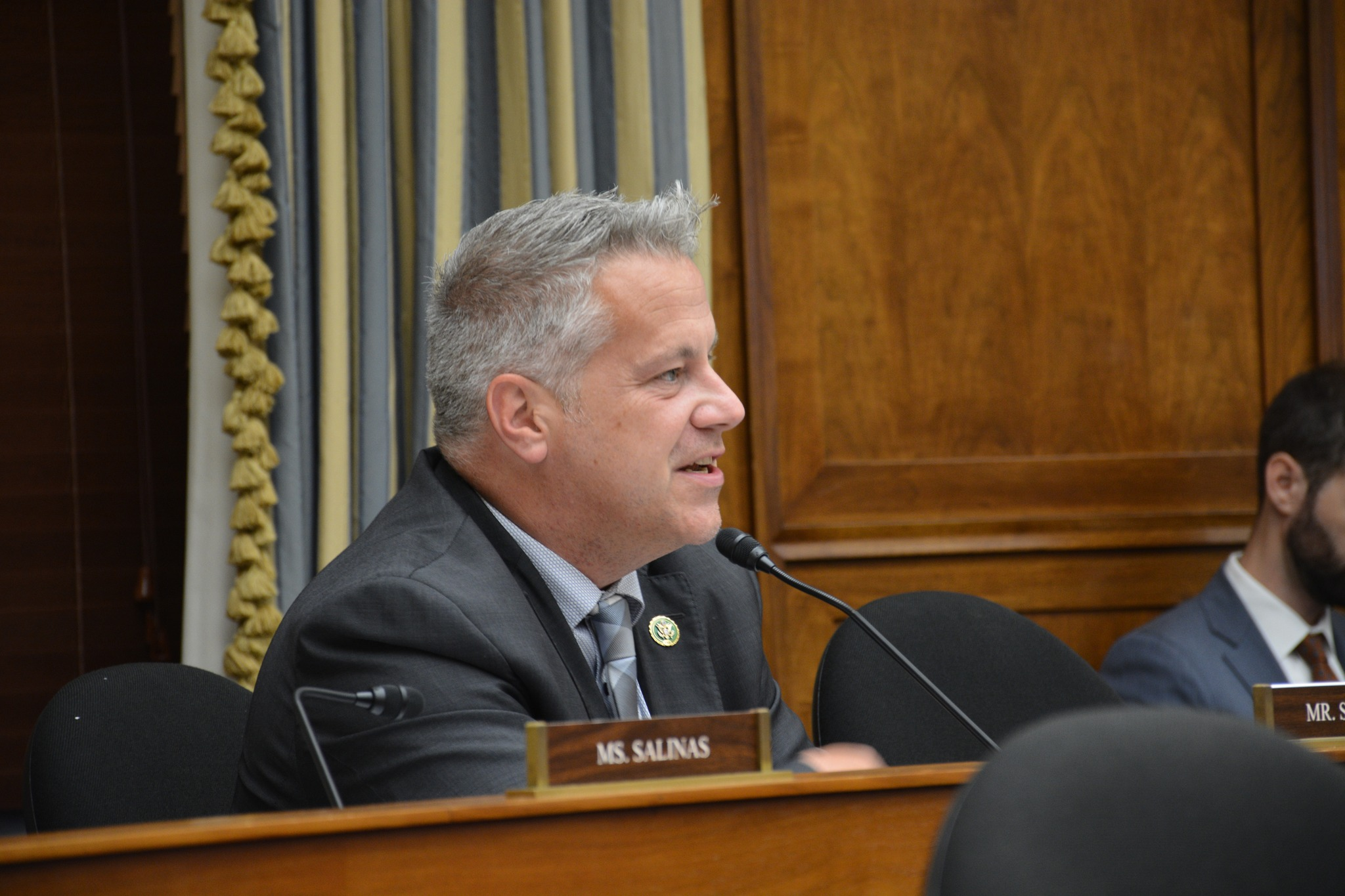
Sorensen on the Science, Space, & Technology Committee, 2023

Sorensen's committee assignments for the 119th Congress include:

- Committee on Agriculture
  - Subcommittee on Conservation, Research, and Biotechnology
  - Subcommittee on General Farm Commodities, Risk Management, and Credit
- Committee on Armed Services
  - Subcommittee on Readiness
  - Subcommittee on Tactical Air and Land Forces

=== Caucus memberships ===
Sorensen's caucus memberships include:

- Congressional Equality Caucus (co-chair)
- New Democrat Coalition
- Labor Caucus
- Future Forum
- Heartland Caucus

== Personal life ==
Sorensen is the first openly gay person to be elected to Congress from Illinois. He lives with his partner in Moline.

== Electoral history ==
=== 2022 ===
Illinois 17th Congressional District Democratic Primary, 2022
Party	Candidate	Votes	%
Democratic	Eric Sorensen	14,702	37.7
Democratic	Litesa Wallace	9,103	23.3
Democratic	Jonathan Logemann	5,628	14.4
Democratic	Angie Normoyle	4,818	12.4
Democratic	Marsha Williams	2,701	6.9
Democratic	Jacqueline McGowan	2,040	5.2
Write-in		14	0.0
Total votes		39,006	100.0

Illinois 17th Congressional District General Election, 2022
Party	Candidate	Votes	%
Democratic	Eric Sorensen	121,186	52.0
Republican	Esther Joy King	111,931	48.0
Write-in		6	0.0
Total votes		233,123	100.0

=== 2024 ===
Illinois 17th Congressional District General Election, 2024
Party	Candidate	Votes	%
Democratic	Eric Sorensen (incumbent)	170,261	54.4
Republican	Joe McGraw	142,567	45.6
Total votes		312,828	100.0

== See also ==
- List of LGBTQ members of the United States Congress

U.S. House of Representatives
Preceded by Cheri Bustos	Member of the U.S. House of Representatives from Illinois's 17th congressional district 2023–present	Incumbent
U.S. order of precedence (ceremonial)
Preceded by Keith Self	United States representatives by seniority 348th	Succeeded by Dale Strong
