= Everton Blair =

American politician (born 1992)

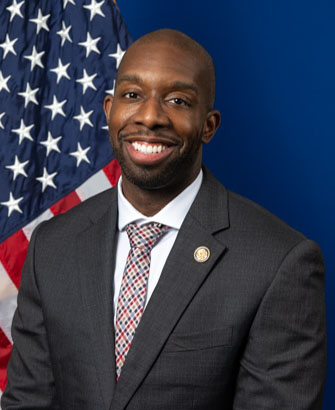
- Official portrait, 2026

Member of the U.S. House of Representatives from Georgia's 13th district
- Incumbent
- Assumed office September 1, 2026
- Preceded by: David Scott

Personal details
- Born: April 23, 1992 (age 34) Gwinnett County, Georgia, U.S.
- Party: Democratic
- Education: Harvard University (BA, EdD); Stanford University (MA)
- Website: House website Campaign website

Everton Blair Jr. (born April 23, 1992) is an American politician and educator serving as the U.S. representative for Georgia's 13th congressional district since September 2026. A member of the Democratic Party, he won a special election to fill the unexpired term of the late David Scott. Blair is the first openly LGBT African American elected to represent a Southern state in Congress.

Blair previously served as a member and chair of the Gwinnett County School Board. He ran in the regularly-scheduled primary election for a full term in May 2026, placing third with 11.6% of the vote.

== Early life and education ==
Blair was born in Gwinnett County, Georgia in 1992 to computer scientist Everton Blair Sr. originally of Kingston, Jamaica, and British born Jamaican-American Emory University medical student Fiona Anderson, who became a pediatrician. The family moved from DeKalb County to Gwinnett in 1996 and Blair graduated from Shiloh High School in 2009.

He then graduated from Harvard College with a bachelor's degree in applied mathematics and from Stanford University with a master's degree in policy, organizations and leadership. He returned to the Harvard Graduate School of Education as a Presidential Public Service Fellow in 2023 and earned a Doctor of Educational Leadership.

== Career ==
Following graduation from Stanford, Blair participated in the White House Initiative on Educational Excellence for African Americans fellowship in the Obama administration then took a job at Los Angeles-based superintendent-training program Broad Academy. He taught in Atlanta for two years through Teach for America.

In 2018, Blair was elected to the District 4 seat of the Gwinnett County School Board, defeating longtime Republican incumbent Chuck Studebaker and becoming the first person of color on the board. He filed to run for the Georgia State Superintendent of Schools in 2022, but ultimately withdrew due to personal reasons in March 2022 before the primary election. His term on the Gwinnett County school board ended in January 2023.

=== 2026 U.S. House campaigns ===
Blair with his family while being sworn in by U.S. House Speaker Mike Johnson, September 2026.

In April 2025, Blair announced his candidacy for the United States House of Representatives election in Georgia's 13th congressional district in 2026, challenging incumbent Democrat David Scott, who was seeking a 13th term. Scott had been in poor health, and Blair was one of a number of candidates to challenge him in the Democratic primary. Scott died on April 22, 2026, though his name remained on the Democratic primary ballot. Blair subsequently announced his candidacy for the special election to fill the remainder of Scott's term to the 119th Congress, to be held after the regular Democratic primary for the 120th Congress.

On June 23, 2026, Blair was defeated in the regular Democratic primary, finishing third behind Heavenly Kimes and eventual winner, state Representative Jasmine Clark, with 11.6% of the vote. Despite his defeat in the regular election primary, Blair continued his campaign for the special election.

In the special election, Blair's main opponent was Marcye Scott, David Scott's daughter and a fellow Democrat. Clark was not a candidate in the special election. Scott and Blair advanced to a runoff after no candidate received 50% of the vote in the first round, held on July 28. Scott received 46.0% of the vote to Blair's 37.4%. In the runoff, held on August 25, Blair defeated Scott 53.9% to 46.1%, securing a seat in Congress for the remainder of David Scott's term. Blair's victory made him the first openly LGBTQ person elected to Congress from Georgia, and the first openly gay black person elected to Congress from any Southern state.

=== Committee assignments ===
- Committee on Financial Services

== Personal life ==
Blair came out as gay on National Coming Out Day in October 2019.

== Electoral history ==
2026 Georgia's 13th Democratic primary results
Party	Candidate	Votes	%
Democratic	Jasmine Clark	61,504	56.1
Democratic	Heavenly Kimes	23,537	21.5
Democratic	Everton Blair	12,733	11.6
Democratic	Emanuel Jones	8,204	7.5
Democratic	Joe Lester	2,046	1.9
Democratic	Jeff Fauntleroy	1,557	1.4
Total votes		109,581	100.0

Georgia's 13th congressional district special election, July-August 2026
Primary election
Party	Candidate	Votes	%
Democratic	Marcye Scott	9,441	46.0
Democratic	Everton Blair	7,680	37.4
Republican	Caesar Gonzales	1,778	8.7
Republican	Fayth Park	972	4.7
Democratic	Carlos Moore	639	3.1
Total votes		20,510	100.0
Runoff election
Democratic	Everton Blair	9,891	53.9
Democratic	Marcye Scott	8,443	46.1
Total votes		18,334	100.0
Democratic hold			

== See also ==
- Kwanza Hall – U.S. Representative from Georgia who was elected in a similar situation
- List of African-American United States representatives
- List of LGBTQ members of the United States Congress

U.S. House of Representatives
Preceded by David Scott	Member of the U.S. House of Representatives from Georgia's 13th congressional district 2026–present	Incumbent
U.S. order of precedence (ceremonial)
Preceded by James Gallagher	United States representatives by seniority 432nd	Succeeded by Aisha Wahab
