= Georgia's 13th congressional district =

U.S. House district for Georgia

- Interactive map of district boundaries since January 3, 2025
- Representative: Everton Blair; D–Lilburn
- Distribution: 93.83% urban; 6.17% rural
- Population (2025): 814,041
- Median household income: $83,591
- Ethnicity: 49.6% Black; 24.6% White; 14.5% Hispanic; 6.9% Asian; 3.5% Two or more races; 0.9% other
- Cook PVI: D+21

Georgia's 13th congressional district is a congressional district in the U.S. state of Georgia. The district is currently represented by Democrat Everton Blair following the death of Democrat David Scott in April 2026. The district's boundaries were last redrawn following the 2010 census, which granted Georgia an additional congressional seat. The first election using the new/current district boundaries (listed below) were the 2012 congressional elections.

== Counties and communities ==
For the 119th and successive Congresses (based on the districts drawn following a 2023 court order), the district contains all or portions of the following counties and communities.

Clayton County (4)

Bonanza, Irondale, Jonesboro, Lovejoy

DeKalb County (0)

District includes no incorporated or census-designated communities

Gwinnett County (6)

Grayson, Lawrenceville (part; also 9th), Lilburn, Loganville (part; also 10th; shared with Walton County), Mountain Park, Snellville

Henry County (1)

Stockbridge (part; also 10th)

Newton County (3)

Covington (part; also 10th), Oxford (part; also 10th), Porterdale

Rockdale County (3)

All three communities

== Recent election results from statewide races ==
Year	Office	Results
2008	President	Obama 56% - 43%
2012	President	Obama 60% - 40%
2016	President	Clinton 63% - 34%
2016	Senate	Barksdale 59% - 37%
2018	Governor	Abrams 69% - 30%
2018	Lt. Governor	Riggs Amico 68% - 32%
2018	Attorney General	Bailey 69% - 31%
2020	President	Biden 70% - 29%
2021	Senate (Reg.)	Ossoff 72% - 28%
2021	Senate (Spec.)	Warnock 73% - 27%
2022	Senate	Warnock 75% - 25%
2022	Governor	Abrams 70% - 30%
2022	Lt. Governor	Bailey 70% - 28%
2022	Secretary of State	Nguyen 67% - 30%
2022	Attorney General	Jordan 70% - 29%
2024	President	Harris 71% - 28%

== List of members representing the district ==
Member (Residence)	Party	Years	Cong ress	Electoral history	District location
District created January 3, 2003
David Scott (Atlanta)	Democratic	January 3, 2003 – April 22, 2026	108th 109th 110th 111th 112th 113th 114th 115th 116th 117th 118th 119th	Elected in 2002. Re-elected in 2004. Re-elected in 2006. Re-elected in 2008. Re-elected in 2010. Re-elected in 2012. Re-elected in 2014. Re-elected in 2016. Re-elected in 2018. Re-elected in 2020. Re-elected in 2022. Re-elected in 2024. Died.	2003–2005 Parts of Butts, Clayton, DeKalb, Fulton, Gwinnett, Henry, Newton, Rockdale, and Walton
David Scott (Atlanta)	Democratic	January 3, 2003 – April 22, 2026	108th 109th 110th 111th 112th 113th 114th 115th 116th 117th 118th 119th	Elected in 2002. Re-elected in 2004. Re-elected in 2006. Re-elected in 2008. Re-elected in 2010. Re-elected in 2012. Re-elected in 2014. Re-elected in 2016. Re-elected in 2018. Re-elected in 2020. Re-elected in 2022. Re-elected in 2024. Died.	2005–2013 Parts of Clayton, Cobb, DeKalb, Douglas, Fayette, Fulton, and Henry
David Scott (Atlanta)	Democratic	January 3, 2003 – April 22, 2026	108th 109th 110th 111th 112th 113th 114th 115th 116th 117th 118th 119th	Elected in 2002. Re-elected in 2004. Re-elected in 2006. Re-elected in 2008. Re-elected in 2010. Re-elected in 2012. Re-elected in 2014. Re-elected in 2016. Re-elected in 2018. Re-elected in 2020. Re-elected in 2022. Re-elected in 2024. Died.	2013–2023 Douglas; parts of Clayton, Cobb, Fayette, Fulton, and Henry
David Scott (Atlanta)	Democratic	January 3, 2003 – April 22, 2026	108th 109th 110th 111th 112th 113th 114th 115th 116th 117th 118th 119th	Elected in 2002. Re-elected in 2004. Re-elected in 2006. Re-elected in 2008. Re-elected in 2010. Re-elected in 2012. Re-elected in 2014. Re-elected in 2016. Re-elected in 2018. Re-elected in 2020. Re-elected in 2022. Re-elected in 2024. Died.	2023–2025 Parts of Clayton, Cobb, Douglas, Fayette, Fulton, and Henry
David Scott (Atlanta)	Democratic	January 3, 2003 – April 22, 2026	108th 109th 110th 111th 112th 113th 114th 115th 116th 117th 118th 119th	Elected in 2002. Re-elected in 2004. Re-elected in 2006. Re-elected in 2008. Re-elected in 2010. Re-elected in 2012. Re-elected in 2014. Re-elected in 2016. Re-elected in 2018. Re-elected in 2020. Re-elected in 2022. Re-elected in 2024. Died.	2025–present Rockdale; parts of Clayton, DeKalb, Gwinnett, Henry, and Newton
Vacant		April 22, 2026 – September 1, 2026	119th		2025–present Rockdale; parts of Clayton, DeKalb, Gwinnett, Henry, and Newton
Everton Blair (Lilburn)	Democratic	September 1, 2026 – present	119th	Elected to finish Scott's term. Lost nomination to the next term.	2025–present Rockdale; parts of Clayton, DeKalb, Gwinnett, Henry, and Newton
Jasmine Clark (Tucker)	Democratic	Assuming office on January 3, 2027		Elected in 2026.	2025–present Rockdale; parts of Clayton, DeKalb, Gwinnett, Henry, and Newton

== Election results ==
=== 2002 ===
Georgia's 13th congressional district election (2002)
Party	Candidate	Votes	%
Democratic	David Scott	70,011	59.63
Republican	Clay Cox	47,405	40.37
Total votes		117,416	100.00
Democratic win (new seat)			

=== 2004 ===
Georgia's 13th congressional district election (2004)
Party	Candidate	Votes	%
Democratic	David Scott (Incumbent)	170,657	100.00
Total votes		170,657	100.00
Democratic hold			

=== 2006 ===
Georgia's 13th congressional district election (2006)
Party	Candidate	Votes	%
Democratic	David Scott (Incumbent)	103,019	69.24
Republican	Deborah Honeycutt	45,770	30.76
Total votes		148,789	100.00
Democratic hold			

=== 2008 ===
Georgia's 13th congressional district election (2008)
Party	Candidate	Votes	%
Democratic	David Scott (Incumbent)	205,914	69.05
Republican	Deborah Honeycutt	92,309	30.95
Total votes		298,223	100.00
Democratic hold			

=== 2010 ===
Georgia's 13th congressional district election (2010)
Party	Candidate	Votes	%
Democratic	David Scott (Incumbent)	140,294	69.43
Republican	Mike Crane	61,771	30.57
Total votes		202,065	100.00
Democratic hold			

=== 2012 ===
Georgia's 13th congressional district election (2012)
Party	Candidate	Votes	%
Democratic	David Scott (Incumbent)	201,988	71.74
Republican	S. Malik	79,550	28.26
Total votes		281,538	100.00
Democratic hold			

=== 2014 ===
Georgia's 13th congressional district, 2014
Party	Candidate	Votes	%
Democratic	David Scott (incumbent)	159,445	100.0
Total votes		159,445	100.0
Democratic hold			

=== 2016 ===
Georgia's 13th congressional district, 2016
Party	Candidate	Votes	%
Democratic	David Scott (incumbent)	252,833	100.0
Total votes		252,833	100.0
Democratic hold			

=== 2018 ===
Georgia's 13th congressional district, 2018
Party	Candidate	Votes	%
Democratic	David Scott (incumbent)	223,157	76.2
Republican	David Callahan	69,760	23.8
Total votes		292,917	100.0
Democratic hold			

=== 2020 ===
Georgia's 13th congressional district, 2020
Party	Candidate	Votes	%
Democratic	David Scott (incumbent)	279,045	77.4
Republican	Becky E. Hites	81,476	22.6
Total votes		360,521	100.0
Democratic hold			

=== 2022 ===
Georgia's 13th congressional district, 2022
Party	Candidate	Votes	%
Democratic	David Scott (incumbent)	216,388	81.7
Republican	Caesar Gonzales	48,228	18.2
Total votes		264,616	100.0
Democratic hold			

=== 2024 ===
Georgia's 13th congressional district, 2024
Party	Candidate	Votes	%
Democratic	David Scott (incumbent)	256,902	71.83
Republican	Jonathan Chavez	100,730	28.17
Total votes		357,632	100.0
Democratic hold			

=== July-August 2026 (special) ===
Georgia's 13th congressional district special election, July-August 2026
Primary election
Party	Candidate	Votes	%
Democratic	Marcye Scott	9,441	46.0
Democratic	Everton Blair	7,680	37.4
Republican	Caesar Gonzales	1,778	8.7
Republican	Fayth Park	972	4.7
Democratic	Carlos Moore	639	3.1
Total votes		20,510	100.0
Runoff election
Democratic	Everton Blair	9,891	53.9
Democratic	Marcye Scott	8,443	46.1
Total votes		18,334	100.0
Democratic hold			
