= 2022 Georgia State Superintendent of Schools election =

- November 8, 2022
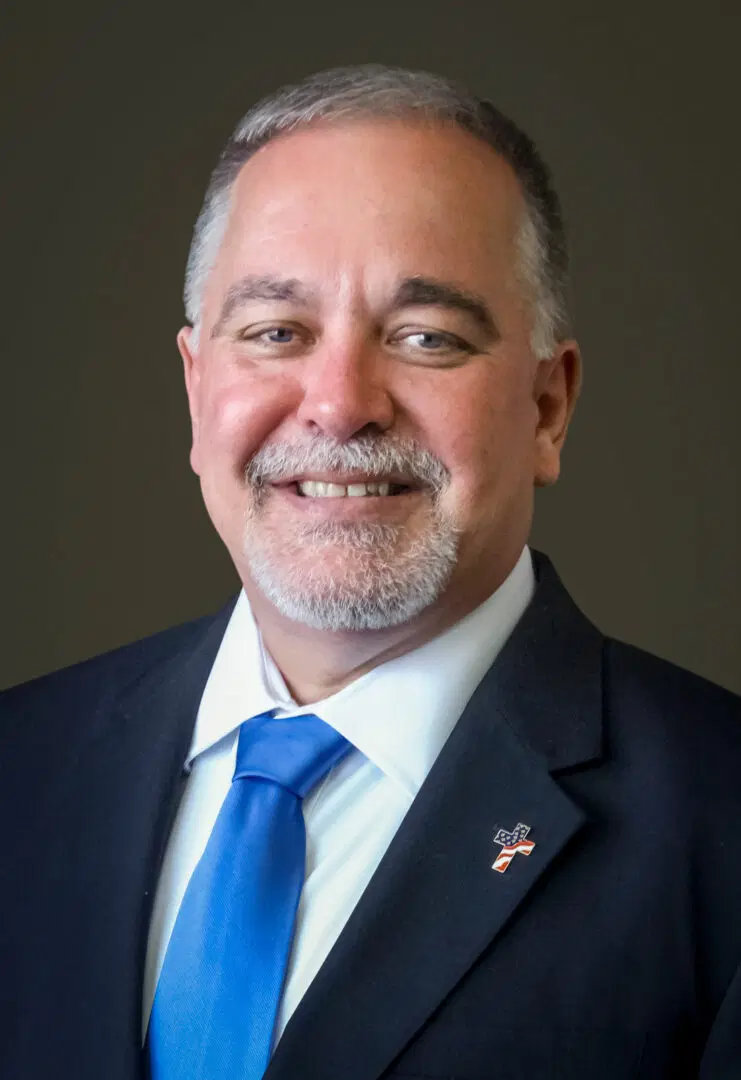

Candidate	Richard Woods	Alisha Thomas Searcy
Party	Republican	Democratic
Popular vote	2,115,728	1,788,671
Percentage	54.19%	45.81%
- Woods: 50–60% 60–70% 70–80% 80–90% >90% Thomas Searcy: 50–60% 60–70% 70–80% 80–90% >90%
State Superintendent before election
Richard Woods
Republican
Elected State Superintendent
Richard Woods
Republican

The 2022 Georgia State Superintendent of Schools election was held on November 8, 2022, to elect the Georgia State Superintendent of Schools, concurrently with elections to the United States Senate, U.S. House of Representatives, governor, and other state and local elections. Primary elections were held on May 24, 2022. A debate was held on October 17, 2022.

Incumbent Republican superintendent Richard Woods ran for re-election to a third term in office, defeating former Republican superintendent John Barge in a rematch of the 2018 Republican primary for the same office. Critical race theory, the COVID-19 response, school choice and transgender students were key issues throughout the campaign. Searcy criticized the Georgia Democratic Party and aligned organizations, including Stacey Abrams, for allegedly ostracizing her due to her stances on charter schools.

Woods defeated Searcy in the general election, slightly expanding on his 2018 margin of victory.

== Republican primary ==
=== Candidates ===
==== Nominee ====
- Richard Woods, incumbent State Superintendent of Schools (2015-present)

==== Eliminated in primary ====
- John Barge, former State Superintendent of Schools (2011-2015) and candidate for Georgia's 14th congressional district in 2020

=== Results ===
Republican primary results
Party	Candidate	Votes	%
Republican	Richard Woods (incumbent)	802,260	72.61%
Republican	John Barge	302,681	27.39%
Total votes		1,104,941	100.00%

== Democratic primary ==
=== Candidates ===
==== Nominee ====
- Alisha Thomas Searcy, state representative from the 39th district (2003-2015), former Atlanta school superintendent, and candidate for state superintendent in 2014

==== Eliminated in primary ====
- Currey Hitchens, attorney and former teacher
- Jaha Howard, Cobb County school board member
- James Morrow, teacher

==== Withdrew before primary ====
- Everton Blair, chairman of the Gwinnett County school board

=== Endorsements ===
Alisha Thomas Searcy

Individuals

- Timothy McDonald, preacher and former president of the Concerned Black Clergy of Atlanta
Everton Blair (withdrawn)

U.S. representatives

- Lucy McBath, U.S. representative for Georgia's 6th congressional district (2019-present)

=== Results ===
Democratic primary results
Party	Candidate	Votes	%
Democratic	Alisha Thomas Searcy	382,792	56.98%
Democratic	Jaha Howard	100,675	14.99%
Democratic	James Morrow	97,821	14.56%
Democratic	Currey Hitchens	90,514	13.47%
Total votes		671,802	100.00%

== General election ==
=== Post-primary endorsements ===
Richard Woods (R)

Labor unions

- Georgia Association of Educators
Alisha Thomas Searcy (D)

State representatives

- Stacey Abrams, minority leader of the Georgia House of Representatives (2011-2017), former state representative (2007-2017), founder of Fair Fight Action, and nominee for governor in 2018 and 2022

Organizations

- Georgia Equality

=== Debate ===
2022 Georgia State School Superintendent debate
No.	Date	Host	Moderator	Link	Republican	Democratic
Key: P Participant A Absent N Not invited I Invited W Withdrawn						
Key: P Participant A Absent N Not invited I Invited W Withdrawn					Richard Woods	Alisha Thomas Searcy
1	October 17, 2022	Atlanta Press Club	Jeff Hullinger	YouTube	P	P

=== Results ===
2022 Georgia State Superintendent of Schools election
Party	Candidate	Votes	%
Republican	Richard Woods (incumbent)	2,115,728	54.19%
Democratic	Alisha Thomas Searcy	1,788,671	45.81%
Total votes		3,904,399	100.00%
Republican hold			

Counties that flipped from Democratic to Republican

- Clay (largest city: Fort Gaines)
- Jefferson (largest city: Louisville)
- Terrell (largest city: Dawson)
- Warren (largest city: Warrenton)
