= David Scott (Georgia politician) =

American politician and businessman (1945–2026)

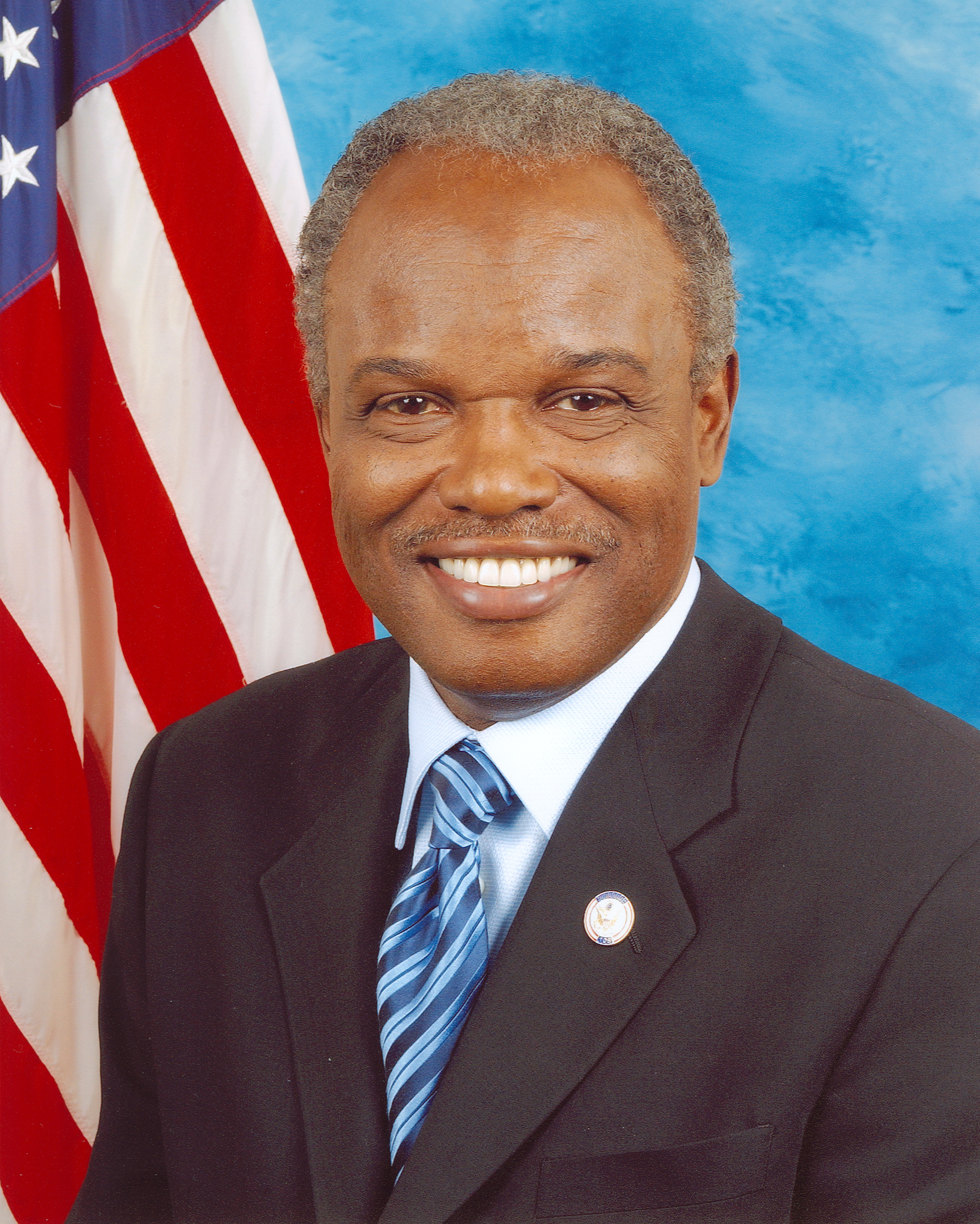
- Official portrait, 2007

Ranking Member of the House Agriculture Committee
- In office January 3, 2023 – January 3, 2025
- Preceded by: Glenn Thompson
- Succeeded by: Angie Craig

Chair of the House Agriculture Committee
- In office January 3, 2021 – January 3, 2023
- Preceded by: Collin Peterson
- Succeeded by: Glenn Thompson

Member of the U.S. House of Representatives from Georgia's 13th district
- In office January 3, 2003 – April 22, 2026
- Preceded by: Constituency established
- Succeeded by: Everton Blair

Member of the Georgia State Senate from the 36th district
- In office January 10, 1983 – January 3, 2003
- Preceded by: Jack Stephens
- Succeeded by: Sam Zamarripa

Member of the Georgia House of Representatives from the 37th district
- In office January 13, 1975 – January 10, 1983
- Preceded by: Bill Stephens
- Succeeded by: Georganna Sinkfield

Personal details
- Born: David Albert Scott; June 27, 1945 Aynor, South Carolina, U.S.
- Died: April 22, 2026 (aged 80) Washington, D.C., U.S.
- Party: Democratic
- Spouse: Alfredia Aaron (m. 1969)
- Children: 2
- Relatives: Hank Aaron (brother-in-law); Kimani Vidal (grandson)
- Education: Florida A&M University (BA); University of Pennsylvania (MBA)
- Scott's voice Scott supporting his bill, the 2013 NARAB Reform Act. Recorded September 10, 2013

David Albert Scott (June 27, 1945 – April 22, 2026) was an American politician and businessman who served as the U.S. representative for Georgia's 13th congressional district from 2003 until his death in 2026. Scott's district included all of Rockdale County, as well as portions of Clayton, DeKalb, Gwinnett, Henry, and Newton counties. Before his election to Congress in 2002, Scott served as a Democratic member of both chambers of the Georgia Legislature and operated a small business. From 2023 to 2025, he was the ranking member of the House Agriculture Committee.

== Early life and education ==
Scott was born in Aynor, South Carolina, on June 27, 1945, but was raised initially by maternal grandparents in South Carolina and later by his paternal grandparents in Scranton, Pennsylvania before reuniting with his parents in Scarsdale, New York at age 11. His family relocated to Daytona Beach, Florida when he was 13 and attended Campbell High School. He received a bachelor's degree from Florida A&M University and a Master of Business Administration from the Wharton School of the University of Pennsylvania. Scott was a member of Alpha Phi Alpha fraternity.

== Early career ==
In 1978, Scott founded Dayn-Mark Advertising (from the names of his two daughters, Dayna and Marcie), which places billboards and other forms of advertising in the Atlanta area. Scott's wife, Alfredia, now heads the business. In May 2007, it was reported that the business owed more than $150,000 in back taxes and penalties. Scott's campaigns paid the company more than $500,000 from 2002 to 2010, including expenses for office rent, printing, T-shirts, and other services. He also paid his wife, two daughters, and son-in-law tens of thousands of dollars for campaign work such as fund raising and canvassing.

Scott served in the Georgia House of Representatives from 1975 to 1983 and in the Georgia State Senate from 1983 to 2003.

== U.S. House of Representatives ==
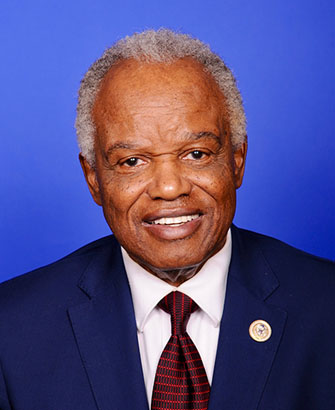
Scott during the 116th United States Congress

When Georgia picked up an additional district (GA-13) as a result of the 2000 census, Scott entered a five-way Democratic primary in 2002 for the seat, winning with 53.8% of the vote. He then defeated Republican Clay Cox in the general election with 59% of the vote. He never faced another contest that close, and was subsequently re-elected eleven times. running unopposed in 2004, 2014, and 2016.

In 2007, the political watchdog group Citizens for Responsibility and Ethics in Washington named Scott one of the 25 most corrupt members of Congress.

During his first two terms, Scott represented a district that twisted and wound its way through parts of nine counties and was barely contiguous in some areas. In a mid-decade redistricting held after the 2004 elections, the district was redrawn to be somewhat more compact, with its population centered in Clayton, Douglas, and Fulton Counties. Redistricting after the 2010 census gave the district all of Douglas County and pushed it further into Clayton.

On March 2, 2026, Scott qualified for the 2026 election.

=== Committee assignments ===
For the 119th Congress:

- Committee on Agriculture
  - Subcommittee on Commodity Markets, Digital Assets, and Rural Development
  - Subcommittee on General Farm Commodities, Risk Management, and Credit
- Committee on Financial Services
  - Subcommittee on Capital Markets
  - Subcommittee on Financial Institutions

=== Caucus memberships ===
- Black Maternal Health Caucus
- Blue Dog Coalition (left in 2023)
- Congressional Equality Caucus
- New Democrat Coalition
- Congressional Black Caucus
- U.S.-Japan Caucus
- Congressional Coalition on Adoption
- Rare Disease Caucus
- Congressional Caucus on Turkey and Turkish Americans
- Congressional Taiwan Caucus

== Political positions ==
Scott was ranked as the 18th-most bipartisan member of the U.S. House of Representatives during the 114th Congress (and the second most bipartisan member of the U.S. House of Representatives from Georgia) in the Bipartisan Index created by the Lugar Center and the McCourt School of Public Policy, which ranks members of the United States Congress by their degree of bipartisanship by measuring how often each member's bills attract co-sponsors from the opposite party and each member co-sponsors bills by members of the opposite party.

=== Affordable Care Act ===
Scott voted for the Affordable Care Act (Obamacare). On August 6, 2009, he was confronted by a constituent who was also a local doctor. The doctor, who later appeared in subsequent debates with his opposition candidate, asked Scott why he was going to vote for a health care plan similar to the plan implemented in Massachusetts and whether he supported a government-provided health care insurance option. Scott questioned whether the doctor was a resident of his district, although the local TV station WXIA-TV confirmed that the doctor did live and work in the district. Scott also said the doctor had not called Scott's office to set up a meeting about health care; this was not verified.

=== Fiscal policy ===
Although Scott voted against the first version of the 2008 bailout, he backed the final version "after being assured the legislation would aid homeowners facing foreclosures. Scott crafted an added provision dedicating $14 billion to aid those homeowners."

=== Same-sex marriage ===
Scott supported two failed pieces of legislation in 2004 and 2006 that aimed to establish a constitutional amendment banning same-sex marriage. However, in May 2013 thinkprogress.org reported receiving an email from a spokesman of Scott saying, "Congressman Scott fully supports marriage equality." The Human Rights Campaign's profile of Scott also contains this sentence as his statement under "position on marriage equality".

=== Iran deal ===
Scott opposed the nuclear deal with Iran, saying, "It's a good deal for Iran, for Russia, China and probably Hezbollah, but is it not, definitely not a good deal for Israel or for the United States or our allies – especially Jordan and Saudi Arabia".

=== Yemeni civil war ===
Scott was one of only five House Democrats who voted to allow the U.S. to continue selling arms to Saudi Arabia and to support the Saudi-led intervention in Yemen. His vote came just one day after the Senate, on December 13, 2018, invoked the War Powers Resolution for the first time since its enactment in 1973 to assert congressional authority and move to end U.S. military involvement.

== Personal life ==
Scott married Alfredia Aaron, the sister of Baseball Hall of Fame member Hank Aaron, in 1969. The marriage produced two daughters, Dayna and Marcye. Scott's grandson is Los Angeles Chargers running back Kimani Vidal.

He allegedly received death threats over his support of the Affordable Care Act – a swastika was found spray-painted on a sign outside his district office.

=== Decline in health and death ===
Politico reported in 2022 that Scott's speech was increasingly halting, he had trouble at times focusing on a topic, and seemed to be forgetting prior conversations. As of 2024, Scott often read from a script and had trouble carrying out conversations about food and agricultural policy that he oversaw, causing alarm among his Democratic colleagues in Congress. One lawmaker remarked "I haven't met a member [of Congress] who isn't concerned" with Scott's ability to carry out his duties as then-Ranking Member of the House Agriculture Committee. Party leadership subsequently removed Scott from that position.

Scott shouts at a photographer taking his photo as he arrives at the Capitol in a wheelchair

In late 2024, Scott shouted at a Politico reporter who photographed him arriving at the Capitol in a wheelchair.

Scott faced criticism from fellow Democrats due to his age; he would have been 81 years old at the beginning of the next Congress, as well as the result of an open records request filed by Jasmine Clark (who will win Scott's district in 2026 United States House of Representatives election) for his voting record that revealed he had not cast a single vote in the last six election cycles, including the 2024 United States presidential election. Scott died at his home in Washington, D.C. on April 22, 2026, at the age of 80, one day after he cast his final vote in the House.

Several major political figures and elected officials paid tributes to Scott following his death. Democratic House minority leader Hakeem Jeffries remarked "David Scott was a trailblazer who served a district that he represented admirably, rose up from humble beginnings to become the first African American ever to chair the House [Agriculture] Committee." Atlanta mayor Andre Dickens said Scott was "one of Georgia’s longest-serving voices in Washington D.C. and a tireless advocate for the people he served."

However, Scott was also criticized after his death for not retiring earlier. As Jim Newell wrote in Slate, "We don’t want to be uncharitable toward the recently deceased, and we should note that he logged decades of impressive years before succumbing to decline. But there's no other explanation for how he served the past few years essentially incapacitated—and now leaves Democrats down another vote in the House—beyond selfishness."

== See also ==
- List of African-American United States representatives
- List of members of the United States Congress who died in office (2000–present)

U.S. House of Representatives
New constituency	Member of the U.S. House of Representatives from Georgia's 13th congressional district 2003–2026	Succeeded by Everton Blair
Preceded by Collin Peterson	Chair of the House Agriculture Committee; 2021–2023	Succeeded by Glenn Thompson
Preceded by Glenn Thompson	Ranking Member of the House Agriculture Committee; 2023–2025	Succeeded by Angie Craig
