= Jasmine Clark =

American scientist and politician (born 1982)

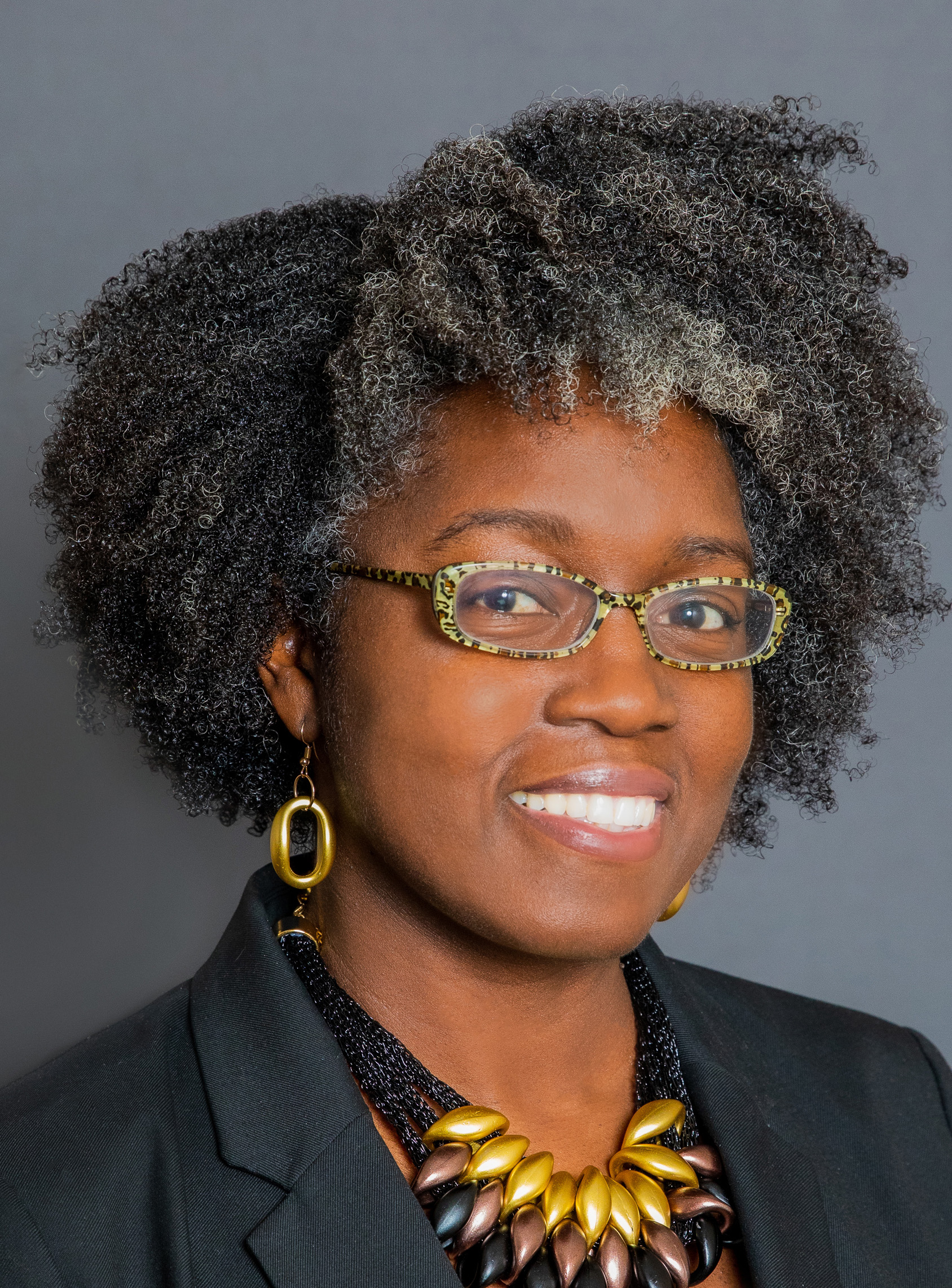
- Official portrait, 2019

Member-elect of the U.S. House of Representatives from Georgia's 13th district
- Assuming office January 3, 2027
- Succeeding: Everton Blair

Member of the Georgia House of Representatives from the 108th district
- Incumbent
- Assumed office January 14, 2019
- Preceded by: Clay Cox

Personal details
- Born: December 26, 1982 (age 43) Atlanta, Georgia, U.S.
- Party: Democratic
- Education: University of Tennessee (BS); Emory University (MS, PhD)

Jasmine Michelle Clark (born December 26, 1982) is an American politician and scientist. She is a member of the Georgia House of Representatives from the 108th district, serving since January 14, 2019. A member of the Democratic Party, she was elected as the representative for Georgia's 13th congressional district in the 2026 election.

== Early life ==
Clark was born on December 26, 1982, in Atlanta, Georgia. She received a Bachelor of Science degree at the University of Tennessee and a Doctor of Philosophy in microbiology and molecular genetics from Emory University.

== Scientific career ==
Clark is an assistant clinical professor at the Nell Hodgson Woodruff School of Nursing at Emory University. As part of her science communication, she organized the 2019 March for Science in Atlanta, Georgia.

In May 2020, Clark received media attention after accusing public health officials in Georgia of "malfeasance" in how they reported COVID-19 statistics from the state. The office of Brian Kemp, the governor of Georgia, denied that there was any attempt to deceive the public.

== Political career ==
=== Georgia House of Representatives ===
Clark was elected as state representative for Georgia House of Representatives District 108 in 2018.

=== U.S. congressional campaign ===
In June 2025, Clark announced her candidacy for Congress, vying to unseat Democratic representative David Scott of Georgia's 13th congressional district. In November 2025, an open records request filed by Clark revealed Scott had not voted in the past six straight elections. Clark ran in the primary for the 13th district in 2026 following Scott's death in April, and won the Democratic nomination for the seat that May. She was elected to the district in the November 2026 general election with around 79% of the vote.

== Political positions ==
Clark supports Medicare for All. She is a supporter of abortion rights.

U.S. House of Representatives
Preceded by Everton Blair	Member of the U.S. House of Representatives from Georgia's 13th congressional district Taking office 2027	Elect
