= 2024 United States House of Representatives election ratings =

The 2024 United States House of Representatives elections were held on November 5, 2024, to elect representatives from all 435 congressional districts across each of the 50 U.S. states. The six non-voting delegates from the District of Columbia and the inhabited U.S. territories will also be elected. Numerous federal, state, and local elections, including the 2024 U.S. Senate elections and 2024 presidential election, were also held on this date.

== Election ratings ==
=== Latest published ratings for competitive seats ===
Several sites and individuals publish ratings of competitive seats. The 93 seats listed below are considered competitive (not "safe" or "solid") by at least one of the rating groups. Of the remaining 342 seats, 167 are considered "safe" Democratic, and 175 "safe" Republican. These ratings are based upon factors such as the strength of the incumbent (if the incumbent is running for re-election), the strength of the candidates, and the partisan history of the district (the Cook Partisan Voting Index (CPVI) is one example of this metric). Each rating describes the likelihood of a given outcome in the election.

In total there are 435 seats in the House of Representatives, 218 are needed for a majority, while 290 seats are needed for a two-thirds supermajority (if all members are sitting and voting).

Graphical summary of national polls

Most election ratings use:

- Tossup: no advantage
- Tilt (sometimes used): very slight advantage
- Lean: significant, but not overwhelming advantage
- Likely: strong, but not certain advantage
- Safe or Solid: outcome is nearly certain

The following are the latest published ratings for competitive seats.

District	CPVI	Incumbent	Last result	Cook Nov. 1, 2024	IE Oct. 31, 2024	Sabato Nov. 4, 2024	ED Nov. 4, 2024	DDHQ Oct. 28, 2024	RCP Oct. 26, 2024	538 (Note: Category ranges: Tossup: <60% both candidates; Lean: ≥60%; Likely: ≥75%; Solid: ≥95%) Nov. 5, 2024	Fox Oct. 29, 2024	ST Oct. 26, 2024	Result
Alabama 2	D+4	New seat	–	Likely D (flip)	Likely D (flip)	Likely D (flip)	Safe D (flip)	Lean D (flip)	Likely D (flip)	Likely D (flip)	Likely D (flip)	Likely D (flip)	Figures (flip)
Alaska at-large	R+8	Mary Peltola	55.0% D	Tossup	Tilt R (flip)	Lean R (flip)	Lean R (flip)	Tossup	Tossup	Lean R (flip)	Lean D	Tossup	Begich (flip)
Arizona 1	R+2	David Schweikert	50.4% R	Tossup	Tilt R	Lean R	Lean D (flip)	Lean R	Tossup	Lean R	Tossup	Tossup	Schweikert
Arizona 2	R+6	Eli Crane	53.8% R	Likely R	Likely R	Likely R	Likely R	Safe R	Solid R	Likely R	Likely R	Lean R	Crane
Arizona 4	D+2	Greg Stanton	56.1% D	Solid D	Solid D	Safe D	Safe D	Likely D	Solid D	Solid D	Solid D	Likely D	Stanton
Arizona 6	R+3	Juan Ciscomani	50.7% R	Tossup	Tossup	Lean R	Lean R	Likely R	Tossup	Lean R	Tossup	Lean R	Ciscomani
California 3	R+4	Kevin Kiley	53.6% R	Likely R	Likely R	Likely R	Likely R	Likely R	Likely R	Likely R	Likely R	Likely R	Kiley
California 9	D+5	Josh Harder	54.8% D	Likely D	Likely D	Likely D	Lean D	Likely D	Solid D	Likely D	Likely D	Safe D	Harder
California 13	D+4	John Duarte	50.2% R	Tossup	Tilt D (flip)	Lean D (flip)	Lean D (flip)	Tossup	Tossup	Likely D (flip)	Lean D (flip)	Lean D (flip)	Gray (flip)
California 21	D+9	Jim Costa	54.2% D	Solid D	Solid D	Safe D	Likely D	Safe D	Solid D	Solid D	Solid D	Safe D	Costa
California 22	D+5	David Valadao	51.5% R	Tossup	Tossup	Lean R	Lean R	Tossup	Lean R	Tossup	Tossup	Tossup	Valadao
California 27	D+4	Mike Garcia	53.2% R	Tossup	Tossup	Lean D (flip)	Lean R	Tossup	Tossup	Lean D (flip)	Lean D (flip)	Lean D (flip)	Whitesides (flip)
California 40	R+2	Young Kim	56.8% R	Likely R	Likely R	Likely R	Lean R	Likely R	Lean R	Likely R	Likely R	Likely R	Kim
California 41	R+3	Ken Calvert	52.3% R	Tossup	Tilt R	Lean R	Lean R	Tossup	Tossup	Lean R	Tossup	Tossup	Calvert
California 45	D+2	Michelle Steel	52.4% R	Tossup	Tossup	Lean R	Lean R	Tossup	Tossup	Tossup	Tossup	Tossup	Tran (flip)
California 47	D+3	Katie Porter (retiring)	51.7% D	Lean D	Tossup	Lean D	Lean R (flip)	Tossup	Tossup	Likely D	Lean D	Lean D	Min
California 49	D+3	Mike Levin	52.6% D	Lean D	Lean D	Likely D	Lean D	Likely D	Likely D	Likely D	Likely D	Likely D	Levin
Colorado 3	R+7	Open seat (Note: Incumbent Republican Lauren Boebert is running in Colorado's 4th congressional district.)	50.1% R	Lean R	Lean R	Likely R	Lean R	Likely R	Lean R	Likely R	Lean R	Lean R	Hurd
Colorado 5	R+9	Doug Lamborn (retiring)	56.0% R	Solid R	Solid R	Safe R	Safe R	Safe R	Lean R	Solid R	Solid R	Safe R	Crank
Colorado 8	EVEN	Yadira Caraveo	48.4% D	Tossup	Tossup	Lean D	Lean D	Lean D	Tossup	Lean D	Tossup	Tossup	Evans (flip)
Connecticut 5	D+3	Jahana Hayes	50.5% D	Lean D	Lean D	Lean D	Likely D	Likely D	Tossup	Likely D	Lean D	Lean D	Hayes
Florida 4	R+6	Aaron Bean	60.5% R	Solid R	Solid R	Safe R	Safe R	Safe R	Solid R	Solid R	Solid R	Likely R	Bean
Florida 9	D+8	Darren Soto	53.6% D	Likely D	Solid D	Safe D	Safe D	Likely D	Lean D	Solid D	Likely D	Safe D	Soto
Florida 13	R+6	Anna Paulina Luna	53.1% R	Likely R	Likely R	Likely R	Lean R	Likely R	Solid R	Likely R	Likely R	Tossup	Luna
Florida 15	R+4	Laurel Lee	58.5% R	Solid R	Solid R	Safe R	Safe R	Safe R	Solid R	Solid R	Solid R	Likely R	Lee
Florida 23	D+5	Jared Moskowitz	51.6% D	Solid D	Solid D	Safe D	Safe D	Safe D	Lean D	Solid D	Solid D	Safe D	Moskowitz
Florida 27	EVEN	María Elvira Salazar	57.3% R	Likely R	Likely R	Likely R	Safe R	Safe R	Likely R	Likely R	Likely R	Likely R	Salazar
Florida 28	R+2	Carlos A. Giménez	63.7% R	Solid R	Solid R	Safe R	Safe R	Likely R	Solid R	Solid R	Solid R	Likely R	Gimenez
Georgia 2	D+3	Sanford Bishop	55.0% D	Solid D	Solid D	Safe D	Safe D	Likely D	Likely D	Solid D	Solid D	Likely D	Bishop
Illinois 17	D+2	Eric Sorensen	51.9% D	Likely D	Likely D	Likely D	Likely D	Likely D	Solid D	Likely D	Likely D	Likely D	Sorensen
Indiana 1	D+3	Frank J. Mrvan	52.8% D	Likely D	Likely D	Lean D	Likely D	Likely D	Tossup	Likely D	Likely D	Likely D	Mrvan
Iowa 1	R+3	Mariannette Miller-Meeks	53.4% R	Tossup	Tilt D (flip)	Lean D (flip)	Lean R	Likely R	Tossup	Tossup	Tossup	Lean R	Miller-Meeks
Iowa 2	R+4	Ashley Hinson	54.1% R	Solid R	Solid R	Safe R	Likely R	Safe R	Lean R	Solid R	Solid R	Likely R	Hinson
Iowa 3	R+3	Zach Nunn	50.2% R	Tossup	Tilt R	Lean R	Lean D (flip)	Tossup	Lean R	Lean R	Lean R	Tossup	Nunn
Kansas 3	R+1	Sharice Davids	54.9% D	Likely D	Solid D	Likely D	Safe D	Likely D	Likely D	Likely D	Likely D	Likely D	Davids
Louisiana 6	D+8	Garret Graves (retiring)	80.4% R	Solid D (flip)	Likely D (flip)	Safe D (flip)	Safe D (flip)	Safe D (flip)	Likely D (flip)	Solid D (flip)	Solid D (flip)	Safe D (flip)	Fields (flip)
Maine 2	R+6	Jared Golden	53.1% D	Tossup	Tossup	Lean D	Lean D	Tossup	Tossup	Lean D	Tossup	Lean D	Golden
Maryland 6	D+2	David Trone (retiring)	54.7% D	Lean D	Lean D	Lean D	Safe D	Likely D	Lean D	Likely D	Likely D	Lean D	McClain-Delaney
Michigan 3	D+1	Hillary Scholten	54.9% D	Likely D	Likely D	Likely D	Safe D	Lean D	Tossup	Likely D	Likely D	Likely D	Scholten
Michigan 4	R+5	Bill Huizenga	54.4% R	Solid R	Solid R	Safe R	Safe R	Likely R	Solid R	Solid R	Solid R	Safe R	Huizenga
Michigan 7	R+2	Elissa Slotkin (retiring)	51.7% D	Lean R (flip)	Tilt R (flip)	Lean R (flip)	Lean R (flip)	Tossup	Tossup	Lean R (flip)	Tossup	Lean R (flip)	Barrett (flip)
Michigan 8	R+1	Dan Kildee (retiring)	53.1% D	Tossup	Tilt D	Lean D	Lean D	Tossup	Tossup	Lean D	Tossup	Lean D	McDonald Rivet
Michigan 10	R+3	John James	48.8% R	Lean R	Lean R	Lean R	Lean R	Tossup	Tossup	Lean R	Lean R	Lean R	James
Minnesota 2	D+1	Angie Craig	50.9% D	Likely D	Likely D	Likely D	Likely D	Likely D	Tossup	Likely D	Lean D	Likely D	Craig
Missouri 2	R+7	Ann Wagner	54.9% R	Solid R	Solid R	Safe R	Likely R	Safe R	Likely R	Solid R	Solid R	Safe R	Wagner
Montana 1	R+6	Ryan Zinke	49.6% R	Lean R	Lean R	Lean R	Lean R	Likely R	Likely R	Likely R	Lean R	Lean R	Zinke
Nebraska 2	EVEN	Don Bacon	51.3% R	Lean D (flip)	Tilt D (flip)	Lean D (flip)	Lean D (flip)	Tossup	Tossup	Lean D (flip)	Tossup	Lean D (flip)	Bacon
Nevada 1	D+3	Dina Titus	51.6% D	Likely D	Solid D	Likely D	Likely D	Likely D	Tossup	Solid D	Likely D	Likely D	Titus
Nevada 3	D+1	Susie Lee	52.0% D	Lean D	Likely D	Likely D	Likely D	Likely D	Tossup	Likely D	Likely D	Likely D	Lee
Nevada 4	D+3	Steven Horsford	52.4% D	Likely D	Solid D	Likely D	Likely D	Likely D	Tossup	Likely D	Likely D	Likely D	Horsford
New Hampshire 1	EVEN	Chris Pappas	54.0% D	Likely D	Likely D	Likely D	Likely D	Likely D	Tossup	Likely D	Likely D	Likely D	Pappas
New Hampshire 2	D+2	Annie Kuster (retiring)	55.8% D	Solid D	Solid D	Likely D	Likely D	Likely D	Lean D	Solid D	Likely D	Likely D	Goodlander
New Jersey 2	R+5	Jeff Van Drew	58.9% R	Solid R	Solid R	Safe R	Safe R	Likely R	Solid R	Solid R	Solid R	Safe R	Van Drew
New Jersey 3	D+5	Andy Kim (retiring)	55.5% D	Solid D	Solid D	Safe D	Safe D	Likely D	Likely D	Solid D	Solid D	Safe D	Conaway
New Jersey 5	D+4	Josh Gottheimer	54.7% D	Solid D	Solid D	Safe D	Safe D	Safe D	Likely D	Solid D	Solid D	Safe D	Gottheimer
New Jersey 7	R+1	Thomas Kean Jr.	51.3% R	Lean R	Tilt R	Lean R	Lean R	Lean R	Tossup	Lean R	Lean R	Lean R	Kean Jr.
New Mexico 2	D+1	Gabe Vasquez	50.3% D	Tossup	Lean D	Lean D	Lean D	Likely D	Tossup	Likely D	Tossup	Lean D	Vasquez
New York 1	R+4 (Note: A new congressional map was enacted in February 2024, after the most recent publication of the Cook PVI.)	Nick LaLota	55.5% R	Likely R	Likely R	Lean R	Likely R	Likely R	Lean R	Likely R	Likely R	Lean R	LaLota
New York 2	R+4	Andrew Garbarino	60.7% R	Solid R	Solid R	Safe R	Safe R	Likely R	Solid R	Solid R	Solid R	Safe R	Garbarino
New York 3	D+3	Tom Suozzi	53.9% D	Likely D	Solid D	Likely D	Likely D	Likely D	Likely D	Solid D	Likely D	Safe D	Suozzi
New York 4	D+5	Anthony D'Esposito	51.8% R	Lean D (flip)	Tilt D (flip)	Lean D (flip)	Lean D (flip)	Tossup	Tossup	Likely D (flip)	Likely D (flip)	Tossup	Gillen (flip)
New York 17	D+3	Mike Lawler	50.3% R	Lean R	Tilt R	Lean R	Lean R	Tossup	Tossup	Lean R	Lean R	Lean R	Lawler
New York 18	D+2	Pat Ryan	50.6% D	Lean D	Likely D	Likely D	Likely D	Likely D	Likely D	Likely D	Lean D	Likely D	Ryan
New York 19	R+1	Marc Molinaro	50.8% R	Tossup	Tilt D (flip)	Lean D (flip)	Lean D (flip)	Tossup	Tossup	Tossup	Tossup	Lean D (flip)	Riley (flip)
New York 22	D+3	Brandon Williams	50.5% R	Lean D (flip)	Lean D (flip)	Lean D (flip)	Lean D (flip)	Tossup	Tossup	Likely D (flip)	Lean D (flip)	Lean D (flip)	Mannion (flip)
North Carolina 1	R+1	Don Davis	52.4% D	Tossup	Tilt D	Lean D	Lean D	Lean D	Tossup	Likely D	Tossup	Lean D	Davis
North Carolina 6	R+11	New seat	–	Solid R (flip)	Likely R (flip)	Safe R (flip)	Safe R (flip)	Safe R (flip)	Solid R (flip)	Solid R (flip)	Solid R (flip)	Safe R (flip)	McDowell (flip)
North Carolina 13	R+11	Wiley Nickel (retiring)	51.6% D	Solid R (flip)	Likely R (flip)	Safe R (flip)	Safe R (flip)	Safe R (flip)	Solid R (flip)	Solid R (flip)	Likely R (flip)	Safe R (flip)	Knott (flip)
North Carolina 14	R+11	Jeff Jackson (retiring)	57.7% D	Solid R (flip)	Likely R (flip)	Safe R (flip)	Safe R (flip)	Safe R (flip)	Solid R (flip)	Solid R (flip)	Likely R (flip)	Safe R (flip)	Moore (flip)
Ohio 1	D+2	Greg Landsman	52.8% D	Likely D	Solid D	Likely D	Likely D	Likely D	Likely D	Likely D	Likely D	Likely D	Landsman
Ohio 9	R+3	Marcy Kaptur	56.6% D	Lean D	Tilt D	Lean D	Lean D	Lean D	Solid D	Likely D	Tossup	Lean D	Kaptur
Ohio 13	R+1	Emilia Sykes	52.7% D	Lean D	Tilt D	Lean D	Lean D	Likely D	Tossup	Likely D	Tossup	Lean D	Sykes
Oregon 4	D+4	Val Hoyle	50.5% D	Likely D	Likely D	Likely D	Likely D	Likely D	Likely D	Likely D	Likely D	Likely D	Hoyle
Oregon 5	D+2	Lori Chavez-DeRemer	50.9% R	Tossup	Tilt D (flip)	Lean D (flip)	Lean D (flip)	Tossup	Tossup	Lean D (flip)	Tossup	Tossup	Bynum (flip)
Oregon 6	D+4	Andrea Salinas	50.0% D	Likely D	Solid D	Likely D	Likely D	Likely D	Solid D	Likely D	Likely D	Likely D	Salinas
Pennsylvania 1	EVEN	Brian Fitzpatrick	54.9% R	Likely R	Likely R	Likely R	Likely R	Likely R	Likely R	Likely R	Likely R	Likely R	Fitzpatrick
Pennsylvania 7	R+2	Susan Wild	51.0% D	Tossup	Tilt D	Lean D	Lean D	Likely D	Tossup	Lean D	Lean D	Lean D	Mackenzie (flip)
Pennsylvania 8	R+4	Matt Cartwright	51.2% D	Tossup	Tilt D	Lean D	Lean D	Lean D	Tossup	Lean D	Tossup	Lean D	Bresnahan (flip)
Pennsylvania 10	R+5	Scott Perry	53.8% R	Tossup	Tilt R	Lean R	Lean D (flip)	Tossup	Tossup	Likely R	Tossup	Tossup	Perry
Pennsylvania 17	EVEN	Chris Deluzio	53.4% D	Lean D	Likely D	Lean D	Likely D	Likely D	Likely D	Likely D	Lean D	Lean D	Deluzio
South Carolina 1	R+7	Nancy Mace	56.4% R	Solid R	Solid R	Safe R	Safe R	Safe R	Likely R	Solid R	Solid R	Safe R	Mace
Tennessee 5	R+9	Andy Ogles	55.8% R	Solid R	Solid R	Likely R	Likely R	Safe R	Solid R	Solid R	Solid R	Safe R	Ogles
Texas 15	R+1	Monica De La Cruz	53.3% R	Likely R	Likely R	Likely R	Likely R	Likely R	Lean R	Likely R	Likely R	Likely R	De La Cruz
Texas 28	D+3	Henry Cuellar	56.7% D	Likely D	Likely D	Lean D	Likely D	Likely D	Likely D	Likely D	Lean D	Safe D	Cuellar
Texas 34	D+9	Vicente Gonzalez	52.7% D	Lean D	Lean D	Lean D	Lean D	Likely D	Tossup	Likely D	Lean D	Likely D	Gonzalez
Virginia 1	R+6	Rob Wittman	56.7% R	Solid R	Solid R	Safe R	Safe R	Safe R	Likely R	Solid R	Solid R	Safe R	Wittman
Virginia 2	R+2	Jen Kiggans	51.6% R	Lean R	Tilt R	Lean R	Lean R	Lean R	Tossup	Lean R	Lean R	Lean R	Kiggans
Virginia 7	D+1	Abigail Spanberger (retiring)	52.2% D	Tossup	Tilt D	Lean D	Lean D	Likely D	Tossup	Likely D	Tossup	Lean D	Vindman
Virginia 10	D+6	Jennifer Wexton (retiring)	53.3% D	Solid D	Solid D	Safe D	Safe D	Safe D	Tossup	Solid D	Solid D	Safe D	Subramanyam
Washington 3	R+5	Marie Gluesenkamp Perez	50.1% D	Tossup	Tossup	Lean R (flip)	Lean D	Lean R (flip)	Tossup	Tossup	Tossup	Tossup	Glusenkamp Perez
Washington 8	D+1	Kim Schrier	53.3% D	Likely D	Safe D	Likely D	Likely D	Likely D	Lean D	Likely D	Likely D	Likely D	Schrier
Wisconsin 1	R+3	Bryan Steil	54.1% R	Likely R	Likely R	Likely R	Safe R	Likely R	Solid R	Likely R	Likely R	Likely R	Steil
Wisconsin 3	R+4	Derrick Van Orden	51.8% R	Lean R	Tilt R	Lean R	Lean R	Lean R	Tossup	Likely R	Lean R	Lean R	Van Orden
Overall				D – 205; R – 208; 22 tossups	D – 214; R – 213; 8 tossups	D – 218; R – 217; 0 tossups	D – 219; R – 216; 0 tossups	D – 207; R – 209; 19 tossups	D - 192; R - 201; 42 tossups	D - 216; R - 214; 5 tossups	D - 205; R - 208; 22 tossups	D - 214; R - 209; 12 tossups	D - 215; R - 220

=== Generic ballot polls ===
The following is a list of generic party ballot polls conducted in advance of the 2024 House of Representatives elections.

Polling aggregates
Source of poll aggregation	Date updated	Dates polled	Democratic	Republican	Others/ Undecided (Note: Calculated by taking the difference of 100% and all other parties combined.)	Lead
RealClearPolitics	October 29, 2024	September 11 – October 24, 2024	46.8%	47.6%	5.6%	R +0.8%
FiveThirtyEight	October 28, 2024	through October 8, 2024	46.4%	45.7%	7.9%	D +0.7%
Decision Desk HQ	October 29, 2024	through October 8, 2024	46.3%	46.4%	7.3%	R +0.1%
Average			46.5%	46.6%	6.9%	R +0.1%

== Party listings ==
The two parties' campaign committees (the National Republican Congressional Committee and Democratic Congressional Campaign Committee) published their own lists of targeted seats.

=== Republican-held seats ===
On April 3, 2023, the Democratic Congressional Campaign Committee released their target seat list which included Republican-held seats and open seats.

1. Arizona 1: David Schweikert
2. Arizona 6: Juan Ciscomani
3. California 3: Kevin Kiley
4. California 13: John Duarte
5. California 22: David Valadao
6. California 27: Mike Garcia
7. California 40: Young Kim
8. California 41: Ken Calvert
9. California 45: Michelle Steel
10. Colorado 3: Open Seat
11. Florida 13: Anna Paulina Luna
12. Florida 27: Maria Elvira Salazar
13. Iowa 1: Mariannette Miller-Meeks
14. Iowa 3: Zach Nunn
15. Montana 1: Ryan Zinke
16. Michigan 10: John James
17. Nebraska 2: Don Bacon
18. New Jersey 7: Thomas Kean Jr.
19. New York 1: Nick LaLota
20. New York 4: Anthony D'Esposito
21. New York 17: Mike Lawler
22. New York 19: Marc Molinaro
23. New York 22: Brandon Williams
24. Oregon 5: Lori Chavez-DeRemer
25. Pennsylvania 1: Brian Fitzpatrick
26. Pennsylvania 10: Scott Perry
27. Texas 15: Monica De La Cruz
28. Virginia 2: Jen Kiggans
29. Wisconsin 1: Bryan Steil
30. Wisconsin 3: Derrick Van Orden

=== Democratic-held seats ===
On March 13, 2023, the National Republican Congressional Committee released their target seat list which included Democratic-held seats and open seats. The Democratic Congressional Campaign Committee also released its frontline members, which are bolded below, and the ones not bolded are seats targeted by the Republican committee but not in the Democratic committee frontline program:

1. **Alaska At-Large: Mary Peltola**
2. California 9: Josh Harder
3. California 47: Open Seat
4. **California 49: Mike Levin**
5. **Colorado 8: Yadira Caraveo**
6. **Connecticut 5: Jahana Hayes**
7. Florida 9: Darren Soto
8. **Illinois 17: Eric Sorensen**
9. **Indiana 1: Frank Mrvan**
10. **Kansas 3: Sharice Davids**
11. **Maine 2: Jared Golden**
12. **Michigan 3: Hillary Scholten**
13. Michigan 7: Open Seat
14. Michigan 8: Open Seat
15. **Minnesota 2: Angie Craig**
16. **North Carolina 1: Don Davis**
17. North Carolina 13: Open Seat
18. North Carolina 14: Open Seat
19. **New Hampshire 1: Chris Pappas**
20. **New Mexico 2**: **Gabe Vasquez**
21. **Nevada 1: Dina Titus**
22. **Nevada 3: Susie Lee**
23. **Nevada 4: Steven Horsford**
24. **Ohio 1: Greg Landsman**
25. **Ohio 9: Marcy Kaptur**
26. Ohio 13: **Emilia Sykes**
27. Oregon 4: Val Hoyle
28. Oregon 6: **Andrea Salinas**
29. **Pennsylvania 7: Susan Wild**
30. **Pennsylvania 8: Matt Cartwright**
31. **Pennsylvania 17: Chris Deluzio**
32. Rhode Island 2: Seth Magaziner
33. **Texas 34: Vicente Gonzalez**
34. Virginia 7: Open Seat
35. **Washington 3: Marie Gluesenkamp Perez**
36. **Washington 8: Kim Schrier**
