= Josh Riley =

American lawyer and politician (born 1981)

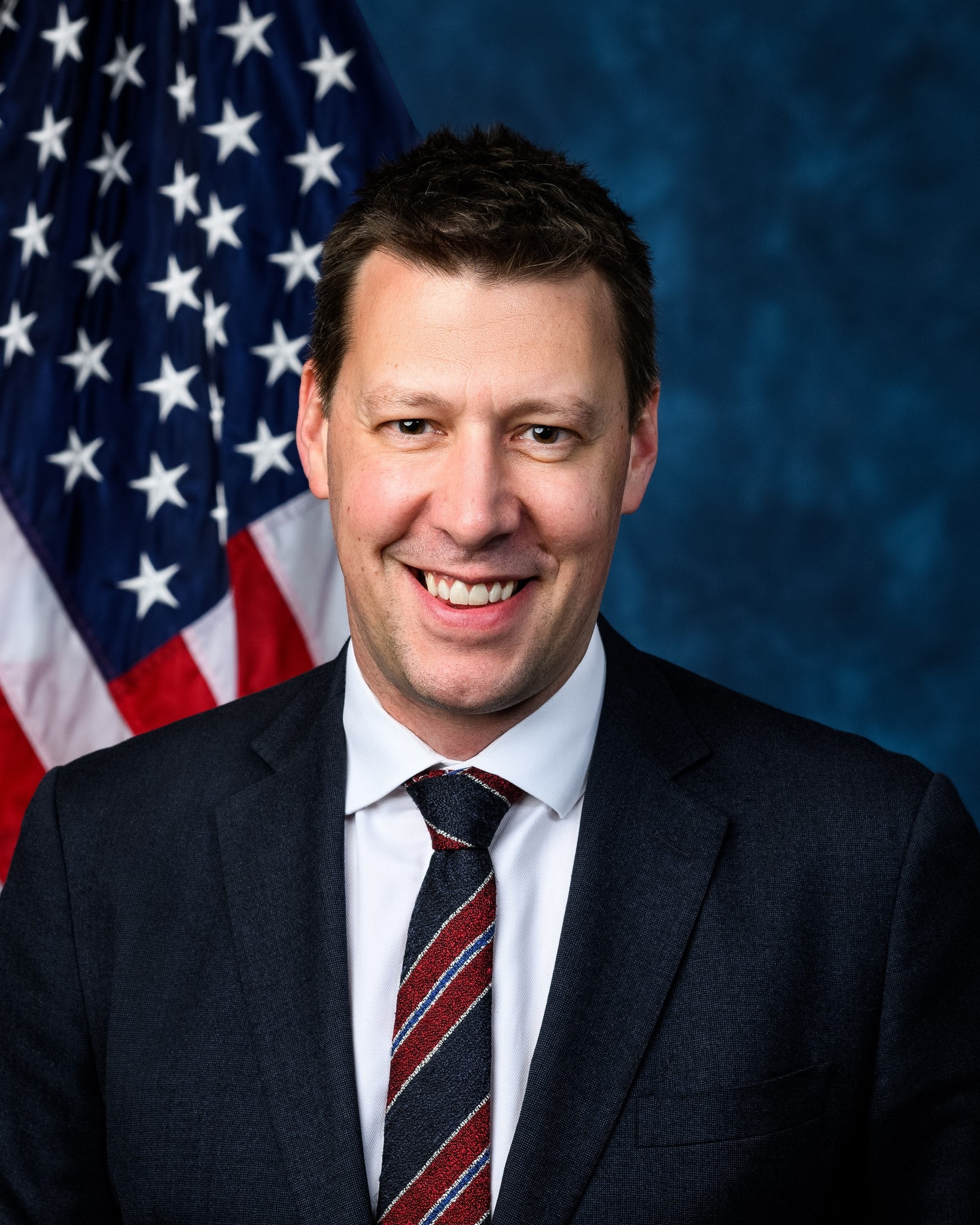
- Official portrait, 2025

Member of the U.S. House of Representatives from New York's 19th district
- Incumbent
- Assumed office January 3, 2025
- Preceded by: Marc Molinaro

Personal details
- Born: Joshua Paul Riley; January 21, 1981 (age 45) Endicott, New York, U.S.
- Party: Democratic
- Spouse: Monica Kohli (m. 2016)
- Children: 2
- Education: College of William and Mary (BS); Harvard University (JD)
- Website: House website Campaign website

Joshua Paul Riley (born January 21, 1981) is an American politician and lawyer who has served as the U.S. representative for New York's 19th congressional district since 2025. A member of the Democratic Party, he previously worked as a policy analyst at the U.S. Department of Labor and as counsel on the U.S. Senate Judiciary Committee. His district covers the southeastern part of Upstate New York, which includes rural areas and the cities of Ithaca and Binghamton.

== Early life and education ==
Joshua Paul Riley was born on January 21, 1981, in Endicott, New York, to Paul and Barbara Riley. He graduated from Union-Endicott High School in 1999 and earned a bachelor's degree in government and economics from the College of William & Mary in 2003.

During college, Riley worked as an aide to U.S. Representative Maurice Hinchey, whom he credited with inspiring his interest in public service. After graduating, he worked as a policy analyst at the United States Department of Labor, focusing on unemployment and trade adjustment programs.

In 2004, Riley enrolled at Harvard Law School, where he worked as a Heyman Fellow on the U.S. Senate Committee on Health, Education, Labor and Pensions. He also volunteered for a legal aid clinic to assist victims of Hurricane Katrina in New Orleans. He graduated with a Juris Doctor in 2007 and was presented the Dean's Award for Community Leadership from then-Dean of Harvard Law School and current U.S. Supreme Court Justice Elena Kagan.

== Legal career ==
After law school, Riley worked as an associate in the law firm of Boies Schiller Flexner for two years. He then clerked for Judge Kim McLane Wardlaw of the United States Court of Appeals for the Ninth Circuit in California. From 2011 to 2014, he served as general counsel to Senator Al Franken on the U.S. Senate Judiciary Committee. Riley later returned to Boies Schiller Flexner, where he became a partner and remained until 2021. He then worked as a partner at Jenner & Block.

== U.S. House of Representatives ==
=== Elections ===
==== 2022 ====
New York's 19th U.S. House district between 2023 and 2025

In November 2021, Riley declared his candidacy for Congress in New York's 22nd congressional district, challenging incumbent Republican U.S. Representative Claudia Tenney. Due to redistricting, redrawing of the map by a court-appointed special master, and U.S. Representative Antonio Delgado resigning to become the Lieutenant Governor of New York, Riley ended up running in the new 19th congressional district.

The old 19th district was represented by Pat Ryan, a Democrat, who won the August special election to succeed Delgado but ran in the new New York's 18th congressional district in the November general election due to redistricting. The 18th district became vacant when incumbent U.S. Representative Sean Patrick Maloney decided to run in the neighboring 17th congressional district after redistricting, which forced out U.S. Representative Mondaire Jones, the incumbent of the 17th district.

Riley defeated Dutchess County businesswoman Jamie Cheney in the Democratic primary and faced Republican nominee and Dutchess County executive Marc Molinaro in the general election. Molinaro lost the August special election to Pat Ryan for the old 19th district, but was on the ballot again in November for the new 19th district. Molinaro defeated Riley in the general election.

==== 2024 ====
In November 2024, Riley was the Democratic nominee in a rematch against incumbent Republican Representative Marc Molinaro for New York's 19th congressional district. He won with 51.1% of the vote to Molinaro’s 48.8%, and contributed to a broader Democratic win in New York state, where the party flipped three House seats.

==== 2026 ====
Incumbent Democrat Representative Joshua Riley was reelected for New York's 19th Congressional District seat on November 4, 2026, defeating Republican state Senator Peter Oberacker.

=== Tenure ===
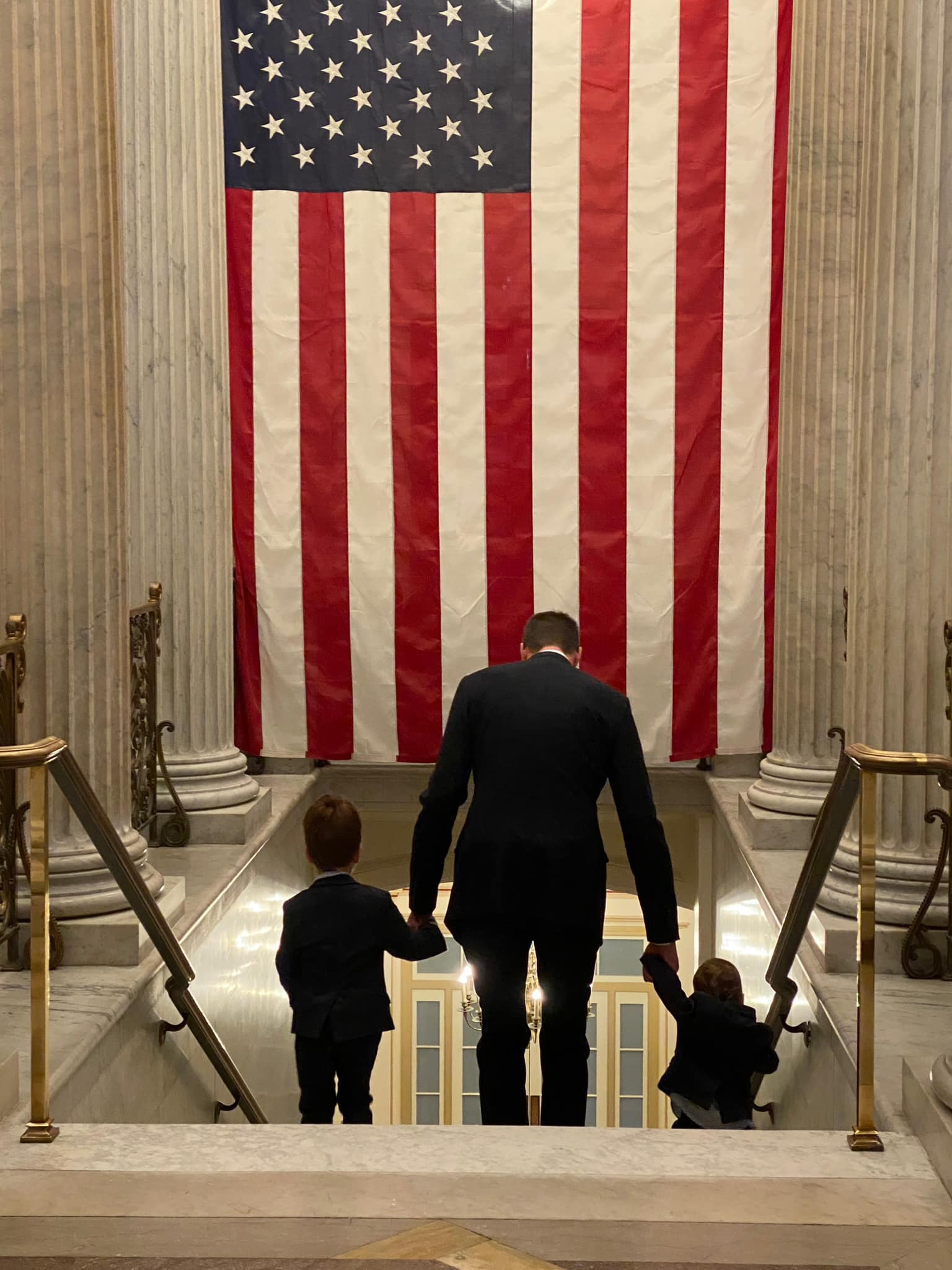
Riley on the day of his swearing into the 119th Congress, 2025

Riley was sworn into office on January 3, 2025, and was assigned to the House Committees on Agriculture and on Science, Space, and Technology. The following month, he introduced his first bill – a bipartisan measure to update the Department of Energy’s Weatherization Assistance Program by raising funding caps and broadening eligibility for low-income households.

As one of his first votes, Riley joined 44 other Democratic and 198 Republican representatives to pass the Illegitimate Court Counteraction Act. The act would impose sanctions on International Criminal Court (ICC) officials who attempt to investigate, arrest, detain, or prosecute any protected person of the U.S. or its allies, in response to the ICC issuing warrants for Israeli officials.

Amid an ongoing avian flu outbreak in New York state, Riley introduced bipartisan legislation to expand financial aid to all poultry producers within affected control zones, with the aim to support family farms, contain the virus, and lower grocery costs for consumers. He subsequently sponsored the Lowering Egg Prices Act, a bipartisan bill to ease federal refrigeration regulations that do not distinguish between fresh and pasteurized eggs, which Riley says contributes to the annual waste of 400 million otherwise usable eggs.

In December 2025, Riley voted against a bill to reopen the federal government. After the federal government was reopened, primarily with Republican votes, after a 43-day shutdown, Riley expressed support for the inclusion of provisions that included $2.6 million in projects in his district.

=== Committee assignments ===
For the 119th Congress:

- Committee on Agriculture
  - Subcommittee on Forestry and Horticulture (Vice Ranking Member)
  - Subcommittee on Livestock, Dairy, and Poultry
- Committee on Science, Space, and Technology
  - Subcommittee on Energy

=== Caucus memberships ===
Riley's caucus memberships include:

- Congressional Equality Caucus
- New Democrat Coalition
- Future Forum
- Labor Caucus
- Sustainable Energy and Environment Coalition

== Personal life ==
Riley lives in Ithaca, New York, with his wife, Monica Kohli, a strategy consultant. They married in Washington, D.C., in 2016 and have two sons.

== Electoral history ==
US House election, 2022: New York District 19
Primary election
Party	Candidate	Votes	%
Democratic	Josh Riley	31,193	62.61%
Democratic	Jamie Cheney	18,625	37.39%
Total votes		49,818	100%
General election
Republican	Marc Molinaro	129,960	45.18%
Conservative	Marc Molinaro	16,044	5.58%
Total	Marc Molinaro	146,004	50.76%
Democratic	Josh Riley	124,396	43.25%
Working Families	Josh Riley	17,113	5.95%
Total	Josh Riley	141,509	49.20%
Write-in		105	0.04%
Total votes		287,618	100%
Republican gain from Democratic			

US House election, 2024: New York District 19
Party	Candidate	Votes	%
Democratic	Josh Riley	170,049	45.06%
Working Families	Josh Riley	22,598	5.99%
Total	Josh Riley	192,647	51.05%
Republican	Marc Molinaro	164,001	43.46%
Conservative	Marc Molinaro	20,289	5.38%
Total	Marc Molinaro (incumbent)	184,290	48.84%
Write-in		406	0.11%
Total votes		377,343	100%
Democratic gain from Republican			

U.S. House of Representatives
Preceded by Marc Molinaro	Member of the U.S. House of Representatives from New York's 19th congressional district 2025–present	Incumbent
U.S. order of precedence (ceremonial)
Preceded by Emily Randall	United States representatives by seniority 413th	Succeeded by Luz Rivas
