= Labor Caucus =

Labor Caucus may refer to:

- Australian Labor Party Caucus
- Labor Caucus (United States)
