= Future Forum =

Congressional caucus in the United States Congress

- Founded: 2015
- Ideology: Millennial and Generation Z issues
- Seats in the House Democratic Caucus: 51 / 214
- Seats in the United States Congress: 51 / 535

Website
- futureforumcaucus-allred.house.gov

Future Forum is a generational caucus of Millennial and Gen Z members of Congress serving in the U.S. House of Representatives. The organization was founded in April 2015 by Representative Eric Swalwell. The caucus consists of 51 Members of Congress who represent congressional districts across the country. Future Forum's co-chairs are Representatives Brittany Pettersen of Colorado, Morgan McGarvey of Kentucky, and Gabe Amo of Rhode Island.

== Mission ==
The mission of the caucus is to address issues important to millennial and Generation Z Americans, such as college affordability, entrepreneurship, job opportunities, and climate change. Future Forum's work is guided by three core principles: Bridging the divide between young Americans and their government, engaging with and empowering young voters, and inspiring the next generation of leaders in public service. Since its inception, Future Forum members have traveled to more than 50 cities to meet with young Americans where they live, work and go to school—at universities and community colleges, business incubators, job training centers, cafes, and breweries.

=== Future Forum Youth Congress ===
Every year, Future Forum holds their Inaugural Future Forum Youth Congress led by Chairman Darren Soto (FL-09) and Executive Director. The Youth Congress gives participants a chance to spend two days with fellow young Americans exploring the inner workings of Congress.

Participants are each assigned a committee appointment and two bills, based on areas of interest indicated by youth representatives. Committees include Judiciary, Education and Labor, and Energy and Commerce. To mirror the Congressional experience, bills are preassigned and considered priorities to young citizens. To gain experience in the debate process, students are asked to provide testimony in a legislative hearing - one in favor of an assigned bill and one in opposition to an assigned bill. Participants get the chance to provide remarks and are responsible for votes during the committee hearing.

=== Task forces ===
As of the 117th Congress, the Future Forum Caucus has the Economy Task Force, the Climate Change Task Force, the Health Care Reform Task Force, the Education Task Force, the Social Justice Task Force, and the Immigration Task Force. The Economy Task Force is co-chaired by Colin Allred and Haley Stevens to push for legislation involving new technologies and innovations. The Climate Change Task Force is chaired by Nanette Diaz Barragán and Mike Levin to research impacts of climate change and how it impacts future generations. The Health Care Reform Committee is co-chaired by Lauren Underwood and Chris Pappas to advocate for legislation addressing the impacts of health care on millennials and Generation Z. The Education Task Force is co-chaired by Sara Jacobs and Jimmy Gomez to ensure proper funding and supplies for public schools in the United States. The Social Justice Task Force is co-chaired by Sharice Davids and Joe Neguse to push for legislation and solutions that addresses the socioeconomic issues important to millennials and Generation Z. The Immigration Task Force co-chaired by Ruben Gallego and Grace Meng promote solutions on issues facing the United States immigration system.

== Leadership ==
- 119th Congress (2025–2027)
  - Gabe Amo (D‑RI‑1), Co-chair
  - Morgan McGarvey (D‑KY‑3), Co-chair
  - Brittany Pettersen (D‑CO‑7), Co-chair
  - Janelle Bynum (D‑OR‑5), New member co-chair
- 118th Congress (2023–2025)
  - Colin Allred (D‑TX‑32), Co-chair
  - Brittany Pettersen (D‑CO‑7), Co-chair
  - Darren Soto, (D‑FL‑10), Co-chair
  - Haley Stevens (D‑MI‑11), Co-chair
- 117th Congress (2021–2023)
  - Darren Soto, (D‑FL‑10), Chair
  - Colin Allred (D‑TX‑32), Vice-chair
  - Haley Stevens (D‑MI‑11), Vice-chair
  - Sara Jacobs (D‑CA‑53), Vice-chair
  - Stephanie Murphy, (D‑FL‑7), Chair Emeritus
- 116th Congress (2019–2021)
  - Stephanie Murphy, (D‑FL‑7), Chair
  - Abby Finkenauer (D‑IA‑1), Vice-chair
  - Jimmy Gomez (D‑CA‑34), Vice-chair
  - Antonio Delgado (D‑NY‑19), Vice-chair
  - Eric Swalwell (D‑CA‑15), Chairman Emeritus
- 115th Congress (2017–2019)
  - Eric Swalwell (D‑CA‑15), Chair
  - Ruben Gallego (D‑AZ‑7), Communications Vice-chair
  - Seth Moulton (D‑MA‑6), Policy Vice-chair
  - Stephanie Murphy (D‑FL‑7), New Member Vice-chair

== Current membership ==
Future Forum in the 118th United States Congress

As of the 119th Congress, the Future Forum Caucus has 51 members. All current members caucus with the Democratic Party. The members are listed by last name:

- Pete Aguilar (D‑CA‑33)
- Gabe Amo (D‑RI‑1)
- Jake Auchincloss (D‑MA‑4)
- Nanette Barragan (D‑CA‑44)
- Brendan Boyle (D‑PA‑2)
- Nikki Budzinski (D‑IL‑13)
- Janelle Bynum (D‑OR‑5)
- Joaquin Castro (D‑TX‑20)
- Jasmine Crockett (D‑TX‑30)
- Chris Deluzio (D‑PA‑17)
- Sarah Elfreth (D‑MD‑3)
- Shomari Figures (D‑AL‑2)
- Lizzie Fletcher (D‑TX‑7)
- Maxwell Frost (D‑FL‑10)
- Dan Goldman (D‑NY‑10)
- Jimmy Gomez (D‑CA‑34)
- Maggie Goodlander (D‑NH‑2)
- Josh Gottheimer (D‑NJ‑5)
- Adam Gray (D‑CA‑13)
- Sara Jacobs (D‑CA‑51)
- Tim Kennedy (D‑NY‑26)
- Greg Landsman (D‑OH‑1)
- Mike Levin (D‑CA‑49)
- Seth Magaziner (D‑RI‑2)
- Sarah McBride (D‑DE‑AL)
- Morgan McGarvey (D‑KY‑3)
- LaMonica McIver (D‑NJ‑10)
- Rob Menendez (D‑NJ‑8)
- Grace Meng (D‑NY‑6)
- Dave Min (D‑CA‑47)
- Jared Moskowitz (D‑FL‑23)
- Joe Neguse (D‑CO‑2)
- Johnny Olszewski (D‑MD‑2)
- Chris Pappas (D‑NH‑1)
- Brittany Pettersen (D‑CO‑7)
- Emily Randall (D‑WA‑6)
- Josh Riley (D‑NY‑19)
- Pat Ryan (D‑NY‑18)
- Hillary Scholten (D‑MI‑3)
- Eric Sorensen (D‑IL‑17)
- Darren Soto (D‑FL‑9)
- Suhas Subramanyam (D‑VA‑12)
- Emilia Sykes (D‑OH‑13)
- Jill Tokuda (D‑HI‑2)
- Ritchie Torres (D‑NY‑15)
- Derek Tran (D‑CA‑45)
- Lauren Underwood (D‑IL‑14)
- Gabe Vasquez (D‑NM‑2)
- Eugene Vindman (D‑VA‑7)
- George T. Whitesides (D‑CA‑27)
- Nikema Williams (D‑GA‑5)

=== Former members ===
- Colin Allred (D‑TX‑32)
- Jamaal Bowman (D‑NY‑16)
- Anthony Brindisi (D‑NY‑22)
- Yadira Caraveo (D‑CO‑8)
- Angie Craig (D‑MN‑2)
- Jason Crow (D‑CO‑6)
- Joe Cunningham (D‑SC‑1)
- Sharice Davids (D‑KS‑3)
- Antonio Delgado (D‑NY‑19)
- Tulsi Gabbard (D‑HI‑2)
- Ruben Gallego (D‑AZ‑3)
- Josh Harder (D‑CA‑9)
- Kendra Horn (D‑OK‑5)
- Steven Horsford (D‑NV‑4)
- Jeff Jackson (D‑NC‑14)
- Hakeem Jeffries (D‑NY‑8)
- Joseph Kennedy III (D‑MA‑4)
- Derek Kilmer (D‑WA‑6)
- Andy Kim (D‑NJ‑3)
- Raja Krishnamoorthi (D‑IL‑8)
- Ben Ray Lujan (D‑NM‑3)
- Ben McAdams (D‑UT‑4)
- Jennifer McClellan (D‑VA‑4)
- Seth Moulton (D‑MA‑6)
- Debbie Mucarsel-Powell (D‑FL‑26)
- Stephanie Murphy (D‑FL‑7)
- Wiley Nickel (D‑NC‑13)
- Ilhan Omar (D‑MN‑5)
- Katie Porter (D‑CA‑47)
- Delia Ramirez (D‑FL‑26)
- Max Rose (D‑NY‑11)
- Raul Ruiz (D‑CA‑25)
- Michael San Nicolas (D‑GU‑AL)
- Mikie Sherrill (D‑NJ‑11)
- Elissa Slotkin (D‑MI‑7)
- Abigail Spanberger (D‑VA‑7)
- Eric Swalwell (D‑CA‑14)
- Greg Stanton (D‑AZ‑4)
- Haley Stevens (D‑MI‑11)
- Xochitl Torres Small (D‑NM‑2)
- Lori Trahan (D‑MA‑3)
- Marc Veasey (D‑TX‑33)
