= Labor Caucus (United States) =

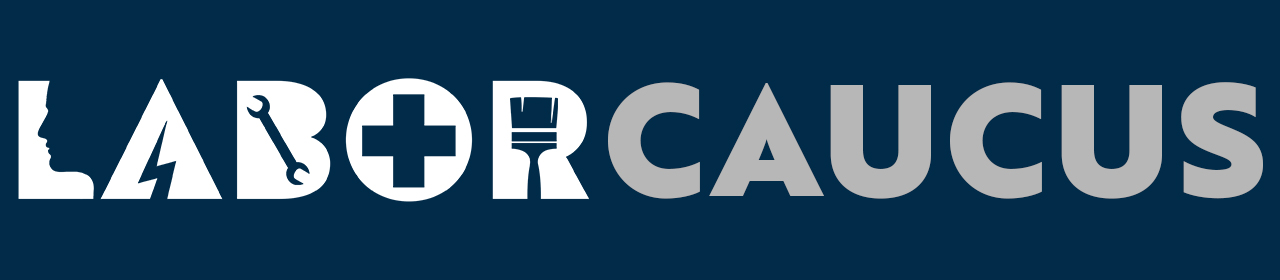
- Co-Chairs: Mark Pocan (WI); Donald Norcross (NJ); Steven Horsford (NV); Debbie Dingell (MI)
- Founded: November 11, 2020; 5 years ago
- Ideology: Laborism
- National affiliation: Democratic Party
- Colors: Blue
- Seats in the House: 127 / 435
- Of the Democratic Party Seats: 127 / 214

Website
- laborcaucus.house.gov//

The Labor Caucus of the United States House of Representatives was founded in November 2020 with the aim of expanding labor union power in the United States. The caucus supports measures such as the Protecting the Right to Organize Act that would expand union participation and make forming unions easier.

== Membership ==
=== 119th Congress ===
Congressional Labor Caucus in the 119th United States Congress

Arizona

- Yassamin Ansari (AZ 3)

California

- John Garamendi (CA 8) - Vice-Chair
- Mark DeSaulnier (CA 10)
- Lateefah Simon (CA 12)
- Eric Swalwell (CA 14)
- Kevin Mullin (CA 15)
- Ro Khanna (CA 17)
- Jimmy Panetta (CA 19)
- Salud Carbajal (CA 24)
- Julia Brownley (CA 26)
- Judy Chu (CA 28)
- Luz Rivas (CA 29)
- Laura Friedman (CA 30)
- Gil Cisneros (CA 31)
- Brad Sherman (CA 32)
- Jimmy Gomez (CA 34)
- Ted Lieu (CA 36)
- Sydney Kamlager-Dove (CA 37)
- Linda Sanchez (CA 38)
- Mark Takano (CA 39)
- Dave Min (CA 47)
- Mike Levin (CA 49)

Colorado

- Joe Neguse (CO 2)
- Jason Crow (CO 6)
- Yadira Caraveo (CO 8)

Connecticut

- Joe Courtney (CT 2)
- Rosa DeLauro (CT 3)
- Jahana Hayes (CT 5)

Delaware

- Sarah McBride (DE At-Large)

Florida

- Darren Soto (FL 9)
- Maxwell Frost (FL 10)
- Lois Frankel (FL 22)
- Jared Moskowitz (FL 23)

Georgia

- Hank Johnson (GA 4)
- Nikema Williams (GA 5)

Hawaii

- Jill Tokuda (HI 2)

Illinois

- Johnathan Jackson (IL 1)
- Delia Ramirez (IL 3)
- Chuy García (IL 4)
- Sean Casten (IL 6)
- Raja Krishnamoorthi (IL 8)
- Jan Schakowsky (IL 9)
- Brad Schneider (IL 10)
- Nikki Budzinski (IL 13) - Vice-Chair
- Eric Sorensen (IL 17)

Indiana

- Frank J. Mrvan (IN 1)
- Andre Carson (IN 7)

Kentucky

- Morgan McGarvey (KY 3)

Louisiana

- Troy Carter (LA 2)

Maine

- Jared Golden (ME 2)

Maryland

- Johnny Olszewski (MD 2)
- Sarah Elfreth (MD 3)
- Glenn Ivey (MD 4) - Vice-Chair
- April McClain Delaney (MD 6)
- Kweisi Mfume (MD 7)
- Jamie Raskin (MD 8)

Massachusetts

- Jim McGovern (MA 2)
- Lori Trahan (MA 3)
- Seth Moulton (MA 6)
- Stephen Lynch (MA 8) - Vice-Chair

Michigan

- Hillary Scholten (MI 3)
- Debbie Dingell (MI 6) - Co-Chair
- Kristen McDonald Rivet (MI 8)
- Haley Stevens (MI 11)
- Rashida Tlaib (MI 12)
- Shri Thanedar (MI 13)

Minnesota

- Angie Craig (MN 2)
- Ilhan Omar (MN 5)

Missouri

- Wesley Bell (MO 1)

Nevada

- Dina Titus (NV 1)
- Steven Horsford (NV 4) - Co-Chair

New Jersey

- Donald Norcross (NJ 1) - Co-Chair
- Herb Conaway (NJ 3)
- Josh Gottheimer (NJ 5)
- Rob Menendez (NJ 8)
- LaMonica McIver (NJ 10)
- Bonnie Watson Coleman (NJ 12)

New Mexico

- Melanie Stansbury (NM 1)

New York

- Thomas Suozzi (NY 3)
- Laura Gillen (NY 4)
- Grace Meng (NY 6)
- Nydia Velázquez (NY 7)
- Yvette Clarke (NY 9)
- Dan Goldman (NY 10)
- Alexandria Ocasio-Cortez (NY 14)
- Ritchie Torres (NY 15)
- George Latimer (NY 16)
- Pat Ryan (NY 18)
- Josh Riley (NY 19)
- Paul Tonko (NY 20)
- John Mannion (NY 22)
- Joseph Morelle (NY 25)
- Tim Kennedy (NY 26)

North Carolina

- Don Davis (NC 1)

Ohio

- Greg Landsman (OH 1)
- Marcy Kaptur (OH 9) – Vice-chair
- Shontel M. Brown (OH 11)
- Emilia Sykes (OH 13)

Oregon

- Suzanne Bonamici (OR 1)
- Maxine Dexter (OR 3)
- Val Hoyle (OR 4) - Vice-Chair
- Janelle Bynum (OR 5)
- Andrea Salinas (OR 6)

Pennsylvania

- Brendan Boyle (PA 2)
- Dwight Evans (PA 3)
- Mary Gay Scanlon (PA 5)
- Summer Lee (PA 12)
- Chris Deluzio (PA 17) - Vice-Chair

Rhode Island

- Gabe Amo (RI 1)
- Seth Magaziner (RI 2) - Vice-Chair

Texas

- Al Green (TX 9)
- Veronica Escobar (TX 16)
- Sylvia Garcia (TX 29)
- Jasmine Crockett (TX 30)
- Julie Johnson (TX 32)
- Greg Casar (TX 35)
- Lloyd Doggett (TX 37)

Vermont

- Becca Balint (VT At-large)

Virginia

- Bobby Scott (VA 3)
- Eugene Vindman (VA 7)
- Don Beyer (VA 8)
- James Walkinshaw (VA 11)

Washington

- Emily Randall (WA 6)
- Pramila Jayapal (WA 7)
- Marilyn Strickland (WA 10)

Wisconsin

- Mark Pocan (WI 2) – Co-chair

=== Former members ===
- Ann Kirkpatrick (D–Arizona; retired 2023)
- Juan Vargas (D–California)
- Alan Lowenthal (D–California; retired 2023)
- Jared Huffman (D–California)
- Barbara Lee (D–California)
- Tony Cárdenas (D–California)
- Lucille Roybal-Allard (D–California; retired 2023)
- Ed Perlmutter (D–Colorado; retired 2023)
- John B. Larson (D–Connecticut)
- Joe Courtney (D–Connecticut)
- Jahana Hayes (D–Connecticut)
- Kathy Castor (D–Florida)
- Frederica Wilson (D–Florida)
- Cheri Bustos (D–Illinois; retired 2023)
- Marie Newman (D–California; defeated in primary in 2022)
- Jan Schakowsky (D–Illinois)
- Bill Foster (D–Illinois)
- Sharice Davids (D–Kansas)
- Chellie Pingree (D–Maine)
- Anthony Brown (D–Maryland; retired to run successfully to become attorney general of Maryland in 2022)
- Alma Adams (D–North Carolina)
- Jake Auchincloss (D–Massachusetts)
- Don Beyer (D–Virginia)
- Earl Blumenauer (D–Oregon)
- Suzanne Bonamici (D–Oregon)
- David Cicilline (D–Rhode Island; resigned in 2023 to become president and CEO of the Rhode Island Foundation)
- Katherine Clark (D–Massachusetts)
- Emanuel Cleaver (D–Missouri)
- Jim Cooper (D–Tennessee; retired in 2023)
- Madeleine Dean (D–Pennsylvania)
- Antonio Delgado (D–New York; retired to run successfully for lieutenant governor of New York in 2022)
- Mike Doyle (D–Pennsylvania; resigned in 2022)
- Adriano Espaillat (D–New York)
- Teresa Leger Fernandez (D–New Mexico)
- Mondaire Jones (D–New York; defeated in primary in 2022)
- Conor Lamb (D–Pennsylvania; retired to run unsuccessfully for US Senate in 2022)
- Brenda Lawrence (D–Michigan; retired in 2023)
- Andy Levin (D–Michigan; defeated in primary in 2022 to redistricting)
- Elaine Luria (D–Virginia; defeated in 2022)
- Tom Malinowski (D–New Jersey; defeated in 2022)
- Carolyn Maloney (D–New York; defeated in primary in 2022 to redistricting)
- Kathy Manning (D–North Carolina)
- Betty McCollum (D–Minnesota)
- Gwen Moore (D–Wisconsin)
- Frank Pallone (D–New Jersey)
- Bill Pascrell (D–New Jersey)
- Donald Payne Jr. (D–New Jersey)
- Tim Ryan (D–Ohio; retired to run unsuccessfully for US Senate in 2022)
- Mikie Sherrill (D–New Jersey; retired to run successfully to become governor of New Jersey in 2025)
- Albio Sires (D–New Jersey; retired to run successfully to become mayor of West New York in 2023)
- Adam Smith (D–Washington)
- Thomas Suozzi (D–New York; retired to run unsuccessfully for governor of New York in 2022)

== See also ==
- Congressional Progressive Caucus
- Blue Collar Caucus
