= Dan French =

American politician

Daniel J. French

Town Supervisor of Beekman, New York

Personal details
- Born: June 29, 1981 (age 45)
- Party: Democratic Party
- Other political affiliations: Working Families Party
- Education: Binghamton University, Rockefeller College of Public Affairs & Policy

Daniel J. French (born June 29, 1981) is an American politician who was the supervisor of the Town of Beekman, New York. He was the 2011 Democratic nominee for Dutchess County executive.

== Early life ==
French was born in the Bronx, his father, Jack, a union painter, and Carolyn. The family moved to the Town of Beekman when French was seven years old. A 1999 Arlington High School graduate, French played on the varsity soccer team and still plays the sport today.

After high school, French graduated from Binghamton University in 2003 with a degree in history, 11 days before the death of his father. To support his family, French moved back to Beekman and worked shifts as a substitute teacher and waiter. French ran for town council later that year, after responding to a newspaper advertisement searching for candidates. He lost by 66 votes, less than two percent of the votes cast.

== Career ==
In 2004, French won a special election to the town council at the age of 23. He was reelected in 2005, receiving the largest number of votes of any council candidate. To supplement his work as a councilman, French enrolled at the Rockefeller College of Public Affairs & Policy and earned a Master's Degree in Public Administration in 2006. Upon receiving that degree, he was appointed Deputy Commissioner of Elections in Dutchess County. Two years later, then-Governor David Paterson appointed French to the board of trustees at Dutchess Community College for a six-year term.

With the seat vacated by three-term incumbent John D. Adams, French entered the race for Beekman Town Supervisor in 2009. He defeated a fellow council member, Republican Barbara Zulauf, with 59% of the vote. As supervisor, French was credited with balancing the budget without an increase to property taxes, and returning $383,000 to the town's rainy day fund.

== 2011 County Executive campaign ==
On April 7, 2011, French announced his candidacy for Dutchess County Executive, an open seat after 20-year incumbent William Steinhaus said he would not seek reelection.

In its convention on June 6, French won the nomination of the Dutchess County Democratic Party in a unanimous endorsement. French also obtained the Working Families Party nomination, but was unsuccessful in winning that of the Independence Party. A May 20 meeting of six members of the party's interim executive committee did not grant French an authorization, thereby refusing a primary for the nomination.

On July 14, the French campaign announced that it had obtained 5,000 signatures to obtain ballot status, exceeding the legal requirement by 3,000 names. Conflict emerged when Conservative Party leaders submitted Republican opponent Marcus Molinaro's paperwork after the deadline. Expecting that the Republican elections commissioner would accept the papers, the French campaign sued to dismiss them; ultimately, however, commissioners of each party ruled the submission invalid.

Throughout August, French received a wave of over a dozen union endorsements. He especially received attention for joining members of the Communications Workers of America on the picket line during the union's strike against Verizon. He then lost the election to Molinaro and moved to Florida.
