= Marc Molinaro =

American politician (born 1975)

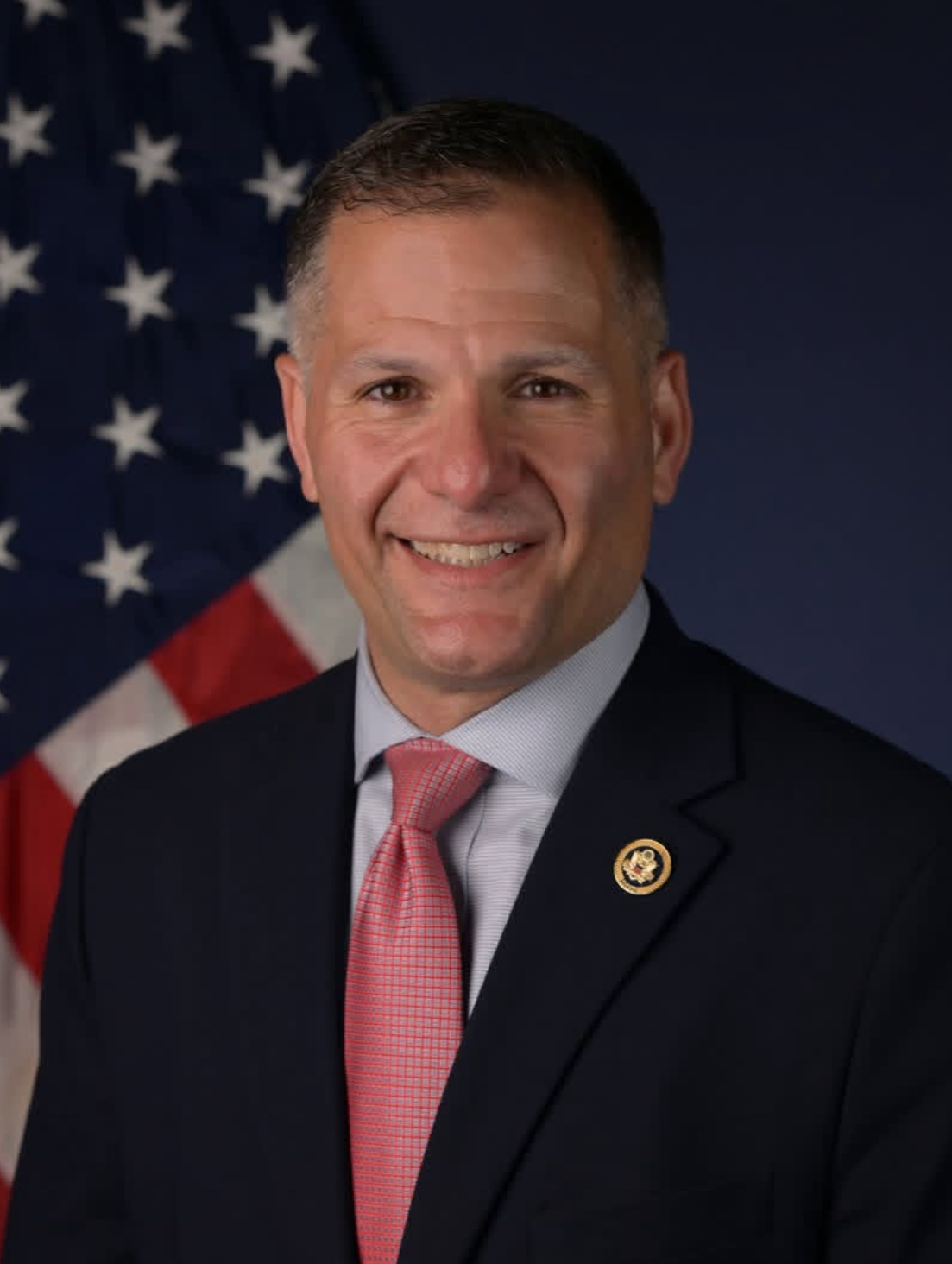
- Official portrait, 2025

Member-elect of the New York State Assembly
- Assuming office January 1, 2027
- Succeeding: Christopher Tague
- Constituency: 102nd district
- In office January 1, 2007 – December 31, 2011
- Preceded by: Patrick Manning
- Succeeded by: Didi Barrett
- Constituency: 103rd district

Administrator of the Federal Transit Administration
- In office August 4, 2025 – February 20, 2026
- President: Donald Trump
- Deputy: Tariq Bokhari
- Preceded by: Nuria I. Fernandez

Member of the U.S. House of Representatives from New York's 19th district
- In office January 3, 2023 – January 3, 2025
- Preceded by: Pat Ryan (redistricted)
- Succeeded by: Josh Riley

County Executive of Dutchess County
- In office January 1, 2012 – January 3, 2023
- Preceded by: William Steinhaus
- Succeeded by: William O'Neil

Member of the Dutchess County Legislature
- In office January 1, 2001 – December 31, 2006
- Preceded by: Frances Mark
- Succeeded by: David Seymour

Mayor of Tivoli
- In office 1995–2007
- Preceded by: Edward Neese
- Succeeded by: Thomas Cordier

Personal details
- Born: October 8, 1975 (age 51) Yonkers, New York, U.S.
- Party: Republican
- Spouse(s): Christy (divorced); Corinne Adams
- Children: 4
- Education: Dutchess Community College (AS)
- Website: House website
- Molinaro's voice Molinaro supporting increased FAA funding Recorded July 19, 2023

Marcus James Molinaro (/moʊlɪˈnɛəroʊ/ moh-lin-AIR-oh; born October 8, 1975) is an American politician from the state of New York who served in Congress and in the second presidential administration of Donald Trump.

A member of the Republican Party, Molinaro was elected to the Village of Tivoli's Board of Trustees at the age of 18. In 1995, he became the youngest mayor in the U.S. when he was elected mayor of Tivoli at age 19. He was reelected to his mayoral post five times and also served in the Dutchess County Legislature. From 2007 to 2011, he represented District 103 in the New York State Assembly. Molinaro served as county executive of Dutchess County, New York from 2012 to 2023. In 2018, he was the Republican nominee for governor of New York, losing to Democratic incumbent Andrew Cuomo.

On September 21, 2021, Molinaro announced that he would run for New York's 19th district in the United States House of Representatives in 2022. In the special election held on August 23, 2022, Molinaro lost to Democratic nominee Pat Ryan, 51.2% to 48.8%. Molinaro was the Republican nominee for the same seat in the November 2022 general election, this time defeating Democratic nominee Josh Riley under new district lines. Molinaro served in the House from 2023 to 2025 and was defeated by Riley in a rematch in 2024.

In February 2025, President Donald Trump nominated Molinaro to be the administrator of the Federal Transit Administration. In August 2025, Molinaro took office after being confirmed by the Senate in a 71–23 vote. He left office in February 2026.

== Early life ==
Marcus James Molinaro was born on October 8, 1975 in Yonkers, New York. He is the son of Anthony Molinaro and Dona Vananden. After his parents' divorce, he and his mother moved to Beacon, New York, in 1980, and to Tivoli, New York, in 1989. Molinaro's mother struggled financially, and the family received food stamps. Molinaro graduated from Dutchess Community College in 2001 with an Associate of Science degree in humanities and social sciences.

== Political career ==
Molinaro was first elected to public office in 1994, when he was elected to the Village of Tivoli's Board of Trustees at the age of 18. In 1995, he became the youngest mayor in the U.S. when he was elected mayor of Tivoli. He was reelected mayor five times, and he also served in the Dutchess County Legislature.

=== New York State Assembly ===
In 2006, Molinaro was elected to represent the 103rd District in the New York State Assembly. He served in the Assembly until 2011. In January 2011, at the recommendation of Assembly Minority Leader Brian Kolb, Governor Andrew Cuomo appointed Molinaro to serve on the Governor's Mandate Relief Redesign Team.

=== Dutchess County Executive ===
Molinaro announced his bid to succeed 20-year Dutchess County Executive William Steinhaus in May 2011. The campaign was endorsed by the county's Republican, Conservative, and Independence parties. On June 3, Beekman supervisor Dan French won the Democratic nomination. Molinaro won the November 8, 2011, election with 62% of the vote. He was sworn into office on January 1, 2012. In 2015, Molinaro was reelected, defeating Democratic nominee Diane Jablonski, 30,181 votes to 17,539. Molinaro won a third term in 2019, defeating Democratic nominee Joseph Ruggiero, 41,285 votes to 29,293.

In 2014, Molinaro was awarded the Pace University Land Use Law Center's Groundbreaker's Award. As county executive, he spearheaded a 2015 initiative called "Think Differently" for people with disabilities; he also appointed a Deputy Commissioner of Special Needs in 2016. In 2015, Molinaro was elected second vice president of the New York State Association of Counties.

Molinaro resigned his position as Dutchess County Executive effective January 3, 2023 after being elected to Congress.

=== 2018 gubernatorial election ===
In March 2018, Molinaro informed Republican leaders that he would run for governor of New York in the 2018 election. He announced his candidacy on April 2, 2018, and was endorsed by the New York Conservative Party on April 13. On May 23, the Republican Party unanimously nominated Molinaro for governor at its state convention, three days after the Reform Party endorsed Molinaro for its gubernatorial ticket. Molinaro's running mate was Julie Killian, a former Rye City councilwoman and state senate candidate. While he was described as a moderate during the campaign, Molinaro said in a March 2018 interview that he considered himself a communitarian, explaining that he believed leaders need to bring together community members of different perspectives to solve the problems they face.

Molinaro faced significant fundraising challenges during his campaign. On Election Day, Molinaro lost to incumbent Democratic governor Andrew Cuomo by a margin of 60% to 36%.

=== U.S. House of Representatives ===
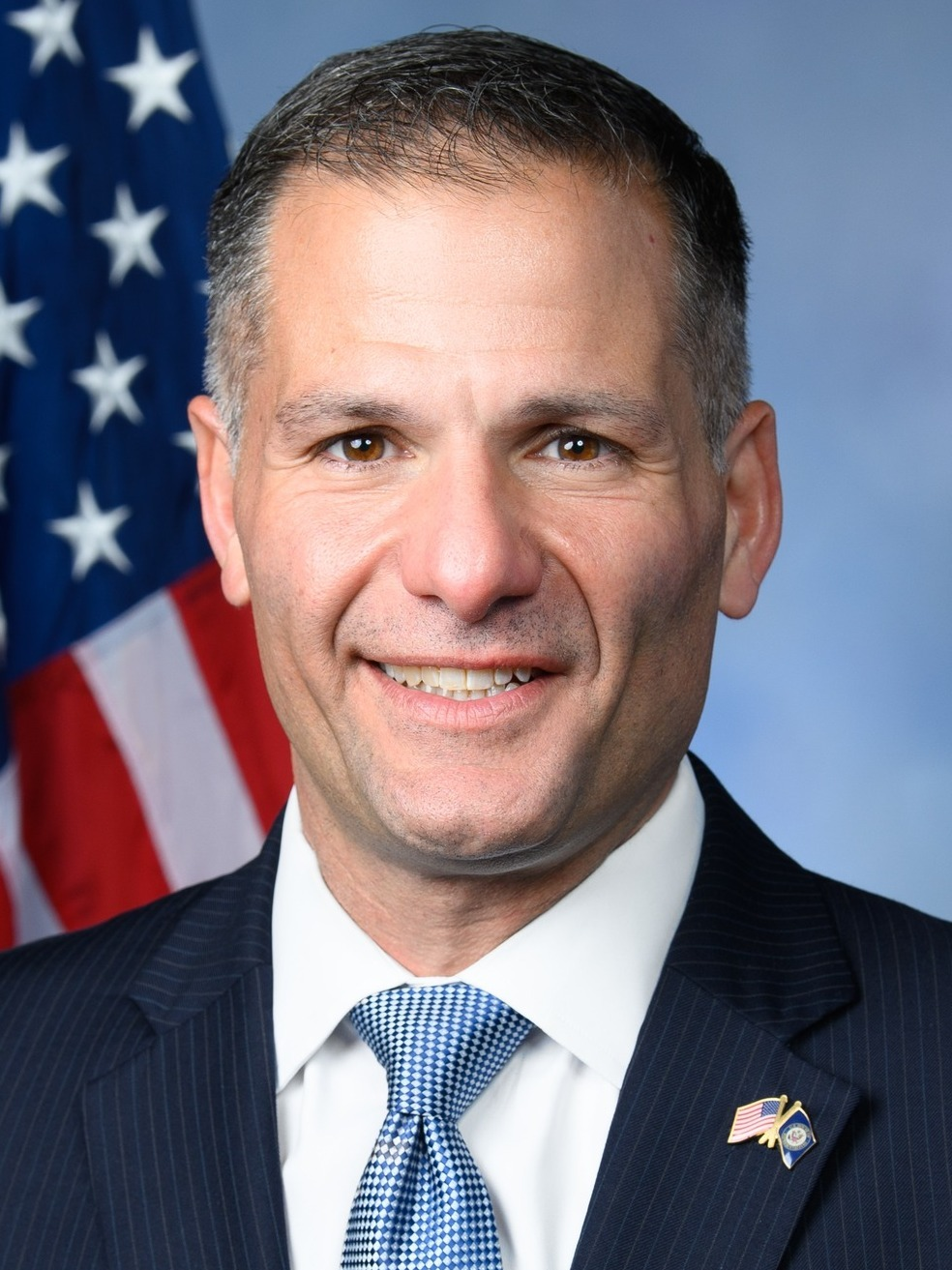
Official congressional portrait, 2022

==== Elections ====
On September 21, 2021, Molinaro announced his candidacy for Congress in New York's 19th congressional district. Ten days after this announcement, his campaign reported raising at least $350,000. A special election to fill the 19th congressional district seat was held in August 2022. The seat was left vacant following Antonio Delgado's appointment as Lieutenant Governor of New York. Molinaro lost the special election to Democrat Pat Ryan.

Molinaro was also the Republican nominee in the November 2022 general election in the 19th district. In that election, he faced Democratic nominee Josh Riley. He narrowly won the House seat with 50.8% of the vote.

Molinaro sought reelection in 2024. He faced Riley in a rematch of their 2022 race. Riley defeated Molinaro.

===== Tenure =====
Molinaro was among a group of New York congressmen calling for the ultimately successful expulsion of George Santos from Congress.

In 2024, Molinaro was rated as the second-most bipartisan member of the U.S. House during the 118th United States Congress in the Bipartisan Index created by The Lugar Center and the McCourt School of Public Policy. He sponsored several bipartisan bills to help children and adults with disabilities.

==== Caucus memberships ====
- Climate Solutions Caucus
- Republican Main Street Partnership

=== Administrator of the Federal Transit Administration ===
In February 2025, President Donald Trump nominated Molinaro to be the Administrator of the Federal Transit Administration. While awaiting U.S. Senate confirmation, Molinaro worked as a Senior Advisor at the FTA. On August 2, 2025, Molinaro was confirmed by the Senate in a 71–23 vote. He was sworn in two days later on August 4. On February 13, 2026, Molinaro announced his resignation as FTA administrator effective February 20, 2026.

=== 2026 State Assembly campaign ===
In February 2026, Molinaro announced his candidacy for New York State Assembly in District 102, defeating Democrat Janet Tweed in the November 2026 election.

== Political positions ==
Molinaro supports same-sex marriage. He said that he would have voted for the Respect for Marriage Act had he been in office during the 117th Congress.

Regarding abortion rights, Molinaro made the following remarks in 2022:

Like it or not, the United States Supreme Court has determined in the Dobbs decision that this is a states rights issue. As such, I do not believe that Congress has any role to play in a woman’s right to access. I will not vote for an abortion ban. On a personal level, I do believe, like most Americans, that very late term and partial-birth abortions, should be restricted, except of course, in the case of rape, incest, and the health of the mother.

During the 118th Congress, Molinaro voted for the Parents Bill of Rights in Education, a bill that would require public schools to disclose information including budget, curriculum, and school performance to parents.

== Personal life ==
As of 2023, Molinaro and his wife, Corinne Adams, resided in Catskill, New York. Molinaro has two children with his first wife Christy and two children with Adams. One of his children is on the autism spectrum.

Molinaro is Protestant.

== Electoral history ==
2018 New York gubernatorial election
| Party | Candidate | Votes | % | ±% |
|---|---|---|---|---|
| Democratic | Andrew Cuomo | 3,424,416 | 56.16% | +8.64% |
| Working Families | Andrew Cuomo | 114,478 | 1.88% | −1.43% |
| Independence | Andrew Cuomo | 68,713 | 1.13% | −0.91% |
| Women's Equality | Andrew Cuomo | 27,733 | 0.45% | −0.96% |
| Total | Andrew Cuomo (incumbent) | 3,635,340 | 59.62% | +5.43% |
| Republican | Marc Molinaro | 1,926,485 | 31.60% | −0.79% |
| Conservative | Marc Molinaro | 253,624 | 4.16% | −2.41% |
| Reform | Marc Molinaro | 27,493 | 0.45% | N/A |
| Total | Marc Molinaro | 2,207,602 | 36.21% | −4.10% |
| Green | Howie Hawkins | 103,946 | 1.70% | −3.14% |
| Libertarian | Larry Sharpe | 95,033 | 1.56% | +1.12% |
| SAM | Stephanie Miner | 55,441 | 0.91% | N/A |
| Total votes | | 6,097,362 | 100.0% | N/A |

2022 New York's 19th congressional district special election
| Party | Candidate | Votes | % | ±% |
|---|---|---|---|---|
| Democratic | Pat Ryan | 58,427 | 45.30% | –2.70 |
| Working Families | Pat Ryan | 7,516 | 5.83% | –0.72 |
| Total | Pat Ryan | 65,943 | 51.13% | –3.66 |
| Republican | Marc Molinaro | 52,350 | 40.58% | –2.62 |
| Conservative | Marc Molinaro | 10,602 | 8.22% | N/A |
| Total | Marc Molinaro | 62,952 | 48.80% | +5.60 |
| Write-in | | 96 | 0.07% | N/A |
| Total votes | | 128,991 | 100.00% | |
| Democratic hold | | | | |

2022 New York's 19th congressional district general election
| Party | Candidate | Votes | % |
|---|---|---|---|
| Republican | Marc Molinaro | 129,960 | 45.18% |
| Conservative | Marc Molinaro | 16,044 | 5.58% |
| Total | Marc Molinaro | 146,004 | 50.76% |
| Democratic | Josh Riley | 124,396 | 43.25% |
| Working Families | Josh Riley | 17,113 | 5.95% |
| Total | Josh Riley | 141,509 | 49.20% |
| Write-in | | 105 | 0.04% |
| Total votes | | 287,618 | 100% |

2024 New York's 19th congressional district general election
| Party | Candidate | Votes | % |
|---|---|---|---|
| Democratic | Josh Riley | 170,049 | 45.06% |
| Working Families | Josh Riley | 22,598 | 5.99% |
| Total | Josh Riley | 192,647 | 51.05% |
| Republican | Marc Molinaro | 164,001 | 43.46% |
| Conservative | Marc Molinaro | 20,289 | 5.38% |
| Total | Marc Molinaro (incumbent) | 184,290 | 48.84% |
| Write-in | | 406 | 0.11% |
| Total votes | | 377,343 | 100% |

Political offices
| Preceded by William Steinhaus | Executive of Dutchess County; 2012–2023 | Succeeded by William O'Neil |
Party political offices
| Preceded by Rob Astorino | Republican nominee for Governor of New York; 2018 | Succeeded by Lee Zeldin |
U.S. House of Representatives
| Preceded by Pat Ryan | Member of the U.S. House of Representatives from New York's 19th congressional district 2023–2025 | Succeeded by Josh Riley |
U.S. order of precedence (ceremonial)
| Preceded by Anthony D'Esposito as Former U.S. Representative | Order of precedence of the United States as Former U.S. Representative | Succeeded by Brandon Williams as Former U.S. Representative |
