= 2022 New York's 19th congressional district special election =

- August 23, 2022

New York's 19th congressional district
- Turnout: 27.16%
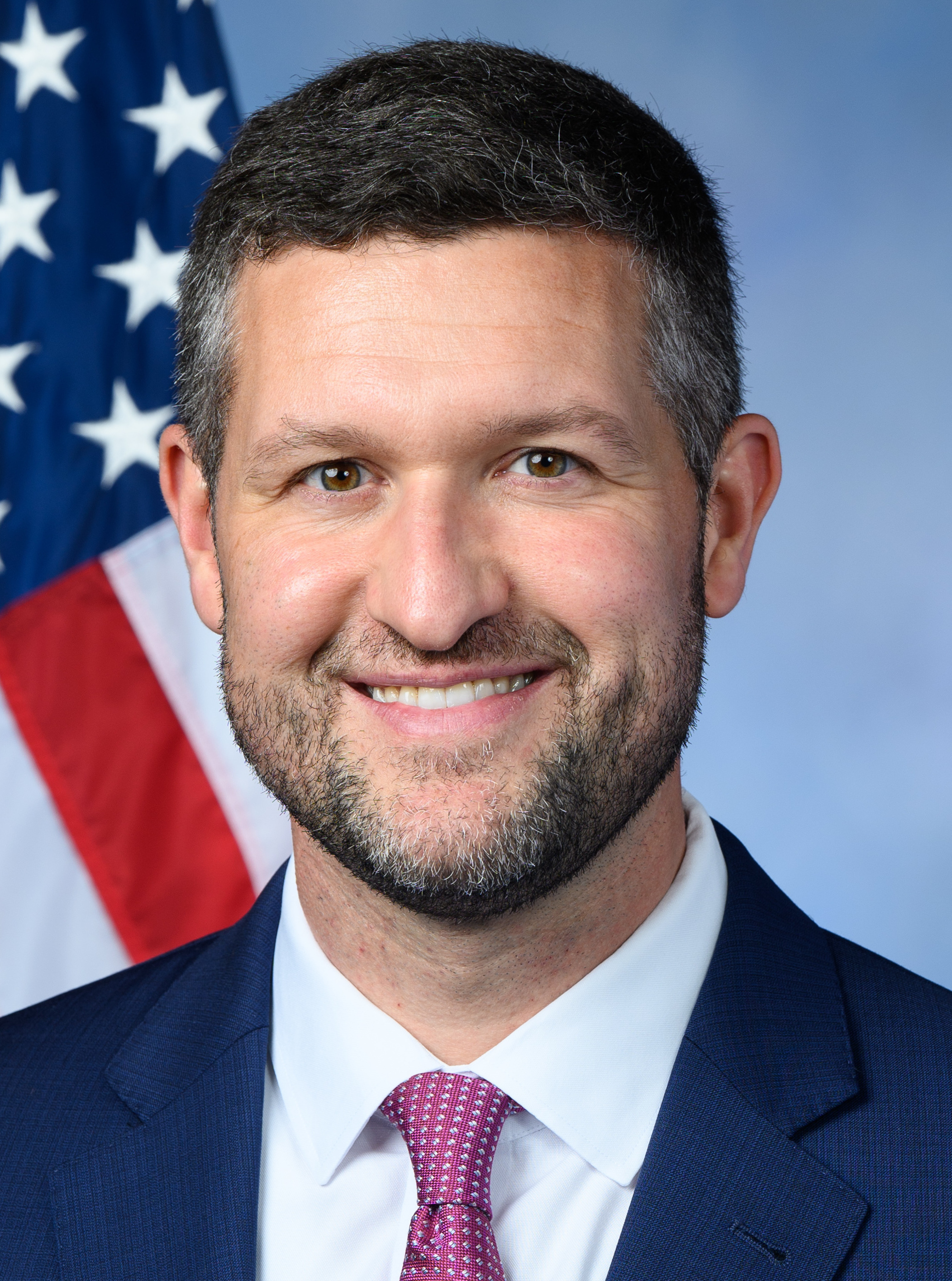

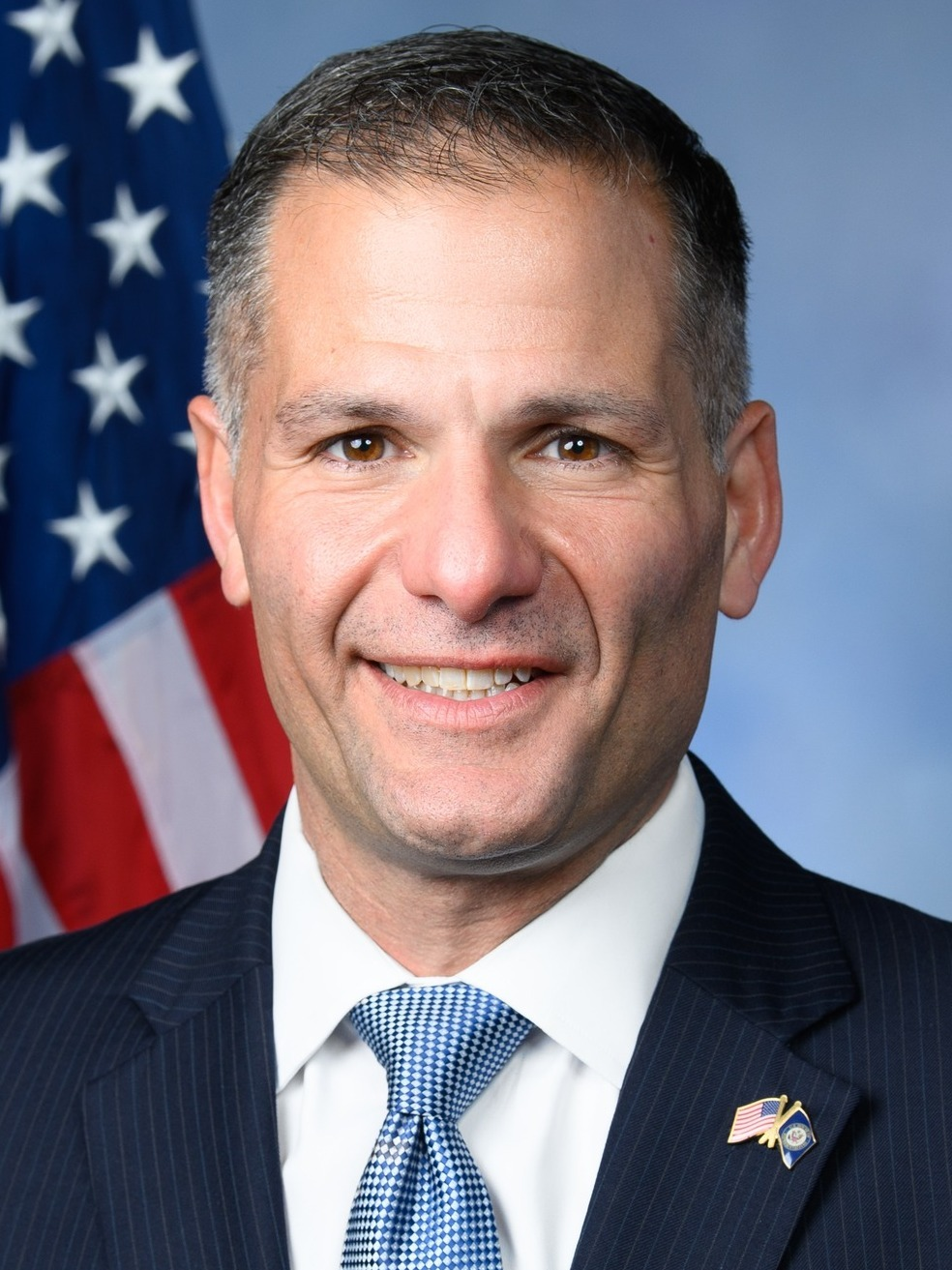
Nominee	Pat Ryan	Marc Molinaro
Party	Democratic	Republican
Alliance	Working Families	Conservative
Popular vote	66,088	63,010
Percentage	51.2%	48.8%
- Ryan: 50–60% 60–70% 70–80% 80–90% >90% Molinaro: 50–60% 60–70% 70–80% 80–90% >90% Tie: 50%
U.S. Representative before election
Antonio Delgado
Democratic
Elected U.S. Representative
Pat Ryan
Democratic

The 2022 New York's 19th congressional district special election for New York's 19th congressional district was held on August 23, 2022, to fill the vacancy created by Democratic U.S. representative Antonio Delgado who resigned to become lieutenant governor of New York. Democratic nominee Pat Ryan defeated Republican nominee Marc Molinaro in what was seen as an upset due to Molinaro's lead in polls and fundraising in the weeks leading to the election.

== Candidates ==
=== Democratic Party ===
==== Nominee ====
- Pat Ryan, Ulster County executive and candidate for this district in 2018

==== Declined ====
- Michelle Hinchey, state senator from the 46th district (endorsed Ryan)
- Zephyr Teachout, special advisor in the office of the Attorney General of New York, Fordham University law professor; candidate for governor in 2014, nominee for this district in 2016, candidate for attorney general in 2018 and 2022

=== Republican Party ===
==== Nominee ====
- Marc Molinaro, Dutchess County executive and former state assemblyman; nominee for governor in 2018

== Endorsements ==
Pat Ryan (D)

U.S. representatives

- Sean Patrick Maloney, NY-18 (2013–2023)

Statewide officials

- Antonio Delgado, lieutenant governor of New York (2022–present)
- Thomas DiNapoli, comptroller of New York (2007–present)
- Kathy Hochul, governor of New York (2021–present)

State legislators

- Michelle Hinchey, SD-46 (2021–present)

Local officials

- 8 mayors (Note: Gary Bassett, mayor of Rhinebeck; Joe DeStefano, mayor of Middletown; Torrance Harvey, mayor of Newburgh; Jeff Kaplan, mayor of Ellenville; Lee Kyriacou, mayor of Beacon; Steve Noble, mayor of Kingston; Tim Rogers, mayor of New Paltz; Karen Smythe, mayor of Red Hook)

Organizations

- VoteVets
Marc Molinaro (R)

U.S. representatives

- Elise Stefanik, NY-21 (2015–present)

Organizations

- National Federation of Independent Business
- New York Federation of College Republicans
- United States Chamber of Commerce

== General election ==
=== Predictions ===
Source	Ranking	As of
The Cook Political Report	Tossup	May 5, 2022
Inside Elections	Tossup	July 21, 2022
Sabato's Crystal Ball	Lean R (flip)	May 11, 2022

=== Polling ===
Poll source	Date(s) administered	Sample size (Note: Key: A – all adults RV – registered voters LV – likely voters V – unclear)	Margin of error	Pat Ryan (D)	Marc Molinaro (R)	Undecided
Data for Progress (D)	August 17–22, 2022	1,222 (LV)	± 3.0%	45%	53%	2%
DCCC Targeting and Analytics Department (D) (Note: This poll was conducted in-house by and for the DCCC)	August 6–8, 2022	480 (LV)	± 4.5%	43%	46%	11%
Triton Polling & Research (R) (Note: This poll was sponsored by Freedom Council USA)	July 26–28, 2022	407 (LV)	± 4.9%	40%	50%	11%
Public Policy Polling (D) (Note: This poll was sponsored by Ryan's campaign and analyzed by Global Strategy Group)	June 29–30, 2022	581 (LV)	± 4.0%	40%	43%	16%
Triton Polling & Research (R)	June 16–20, 2022	505 (LV)	± 4.4%	38%	52%	10%

Hypothetical polling

Generic Democrat vs. generic Republican

Poll source	Date(s) administered	Sample size	Margin of error	Generic Democrat	Generic Republican	Undecided
DCCC Targeting and Analytics Department (D)	August 6–8, 2022	480 (LV)	± 4.5%	44%	45%	12%

=== Fundraising ===
Campaign finance reports as of August 3, 2022
Candidate	Amount raised	Amount spent	Cash on hand
Marc Molinaro (R)	$1,593,762	$993,626	$600,136
Pat Ryan (D)	$1,582,369	$1,265,848	$316,522
Source: OpenSecrets

=== Results ===
Pat Ryan won the election with 66,088 votes or 51.2% of the vote compared to Marc Molinaro's 48.8% of the vote or 63,010 votes. This defied most polls, which had Molinaro winning by a somewhat comfortable margin as well as Sabato's Crystal Ball rating of Lean R. His victory can be attributed to his large margins in Ulster County. Ryan overperformed Joe Biden's 2020 margin in this district by about 0.8%. The result was considered an upset by some, as Molinaro had led by as much as 14 percentage points in public polling of the race, and Molinaro outspent Ryan on television advertising. Ryan's victory led some forecasters to change some of their predictions for the 2022 House election. Ultimately, the special election foreshadowed 2022 would not go on to be a red wave, as while Republicans would narrowly flip the House of Representatives, they would lose a seat in the United States Senate.

2022 New York's 19th congressional district special election
Party	Candidate	Votes	%	±%
Democratic	Pat Ryan	58,636	45.39%	–2.61
Working Families	Pat Ryan	7,452	5.77%	–0.78
Total	Pat Ryan	66,088	51.15%	–3.64
Republican	Marc Molinaro	52,514	40.65%	–2.55
Conservative	Marc Molinaro	10,496	8.12%	N/A
Total	Marc Molinaro	63,010	48.77%	+5.57
Write-in		96	0.07%	N/A
Total votes		129,194	100.00%	
Turnout		129,328	27.16%	
Registered electors		476,134		
Democratic hold				

By county

County	Pat Ryan Democratic		Marc Molinaro Republican		Write-in		Margin		Total votes	Turnout
County	#	%	#	%	#	%	#	%	Total votes	Turnout
Broome (part)	81	30.00	189	70.00	0	0.00	-108	-40.00	270	18.90
Columbia	9,026	57.35	6,704	42.60	8	0.05	2,322	14.75	15,738	32.71
Delaware	3,033	41.42	4,287	58.55	2	0.03	-1,254	-17.13	7,322	24.85
Dutchess (part)	12,257	48.44	13,030	51.49	17	0.07	-773	-3.05	25,304	31.07
Greene	3,632	39.21	5,626	60.74	4	0.04	-1,994	-21.53	9,262	28.67
Montgomery (part)	440	36.48	766	63.52	0	0.00	-326	-27.03	1,206	14.16
Otsego	4,153	48.26	4,434	51.52	19	0.22	-281	-3.27	8,606	24.23
Rensselaer (part)	3,901	45.13	4,739	54.83	3	0.04	-838	-9.70	8,643	18.51
Schoharie	1,642	34.05	3,176	65.85	5	0.10	-1,534	-31.81	4,823	24.27
Sullivan	3,881	42.72	5,196	57.19	8	0.09	-1,315	-14.47	9,085	18.84
Ulster	24,042	61.75	14,863	38.17	30	0.08	9,179	23.58	38,935	31.35
Totals	66,088	51.15	63,010	48.77	96	0.07	3,078	2.38	129,194	27.16

Counties that flipped from Democratic to Republican

- Dutchess (largest municipality: Poughkeepsie)
- Otsego (largest municipality: Oneonta)
- Rensselaer (largest municipality: Troy)
- Sullivan (largest municipality: Monticello)

== See also ==
- 2022 United States House of Representatives elections
- 2022 United States elections
- 117th United States Congress
- List of special elections to the United States House of Representatives

== Notes ==
Partisan clients
