= Pat Ryan (politician) =

American politician (born 1982)

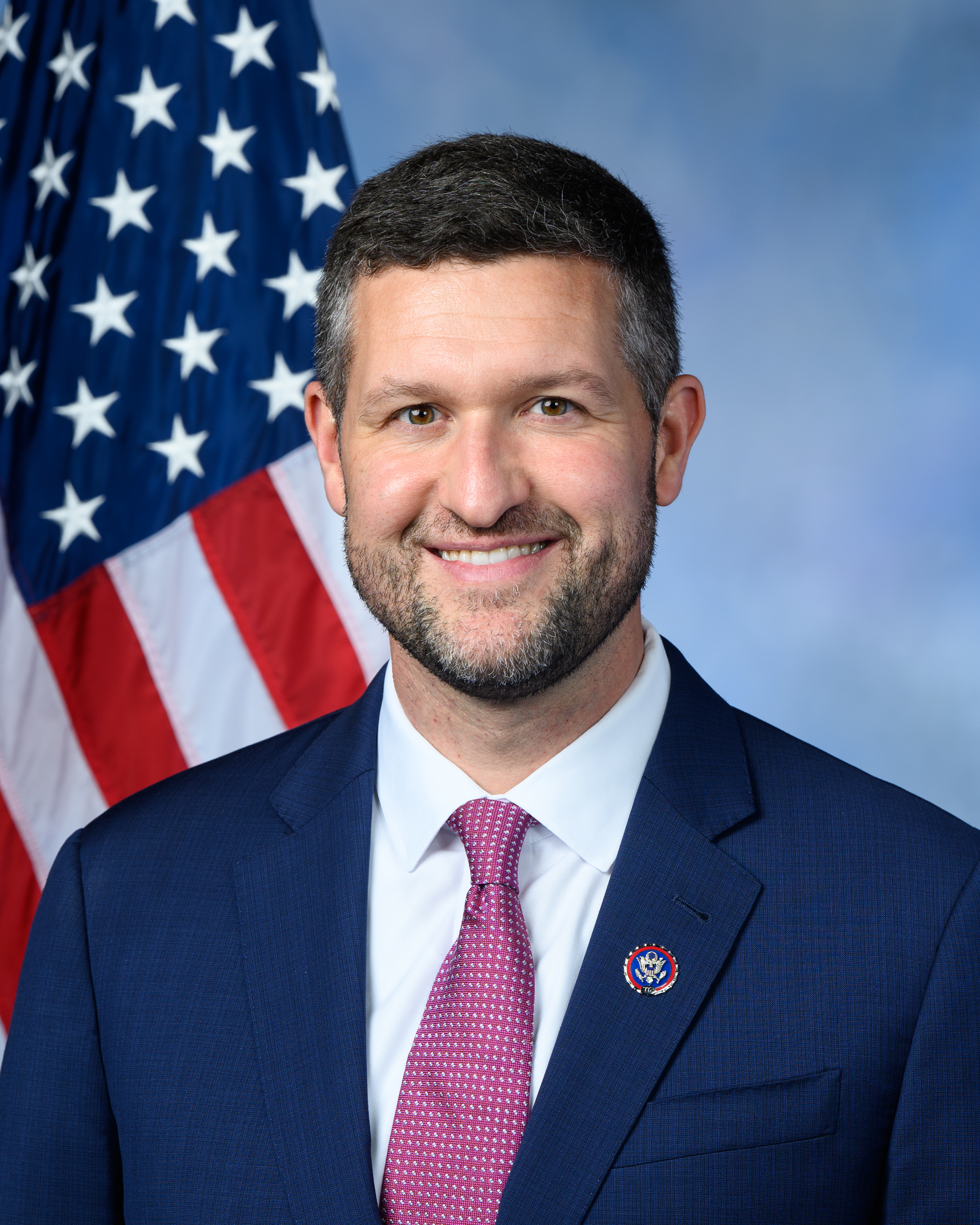
- Official portrait, 2022

Member of the U.S. House of Representatives from New York
- Incumbent
- Assumed office September 13, 2022
- Preceded by: Antonio Delgado
- Constituency: 19th district (2022–2023); 18th district (2023–present)

2nd County Executive of Ulster County
- In office June 7, 2019 – September 9, 2022
- Preceded by: Adele Reiter (acting)
- Succeeded by: Johanna Contreras (acting)

Personal details
- Born: Patrick Kevin Ryan; March 28, 1982 (age 44) Kingston, New York, U.S.
- Party: Democratic
- Spouse: Rebecca Grusky (m. 2015)
- Children: 2
- Education: United States Military Academy (BS); Georgetown University (MA)
- Website: House website Campaign website

Military service
- Branch/service: United States Army
- Years of service: 2004–2009
- Rank: Captain
- Unit: Military Intelligence Corps
- Battles/wars: Iraq War
- Awards: Bronze Star Medal (2); Army Commendation Medal; Army Achievement Medal

Patrick Kevin Ryan (born March 28, 1982) is an American businessman, politician, and former U.S. Army intelligence officer serving as the U.S. representative for New York's 18th congressional district since 2023. A member of the Democratic Party, he previously served as the representative for New York's 19th congressional district from 2022 to 2023 after being elected in a special election. Before being elected to the House, he was the county executive of Ulster County, New York.

== Early life and career ==
Ryan was born and raised in Kingston, New York. His mother was a public school teacher and his father owned a small business. He graduated from Kingston High School in 2000. He then earned a Bachelor of Science in international politics from the United States Military Academy in 2004 and a Master of Arts in security studies from Georgetown University. Two of his West Point classmates are fellow Congressmen John James and Wesley Hunt.

Ryan served in the U.S. Army as a military intelligence officer from 2004 to 2009. He completed two combat tours in Iraq, including a deployment to Mosul in 2008 during the height of the insurgency. He attained the rank of captain and was awarded two Bronze Star Medals and Army Commendation Medal.

From 2009 to 2011, he worked as the deputy director of Berico Technologies, as a subcontractor for Palantir Technologies in Afghanistan. He co-founded Praescient Analytics, a software company, in 2011. From 2015 to 2017, he was a senior vice president of Dataminr, an artificial intelligence platform. In 2018 and 2019, Ryan was a senior adviser at New Politics.

== Ulster County executive (2019–2022) ==
In February 2019, Ulster County Executive Mike Hein resigned to take a position in New York Governor Andrew Cuomo's administration. On April 30, Ryan defeated Republican nominee Jack Hayes in the special election to succeed Hein; he took office on June 7, 2019. He became the second executive of Ulster County since it adopted a county charter in 2008. In November 2019, he defeated Hayes in a rematch to win a full four-year term as county executive.

As county executive, Ryan piloted a universal basic income program, wherein 100 families in the county received $500 per month. He also enacted several environmental protections in Ulster County, committing to fully transition the operations of the county government to renewable energy by 2030 and partnering with SUNY Ulster to promote green energy jobs.

On January 14, 2020, Ryan endorsed Pete Buttigieg in the 2020 Democratic Party presidential primaries. In a statement, Ryan cited Buttigieg's military service, his "bold progressive vision," and his "moral leadership" as his reasons for support.

On September 9, 2022, Ryan stepped down as Ulster County executive. The deputy county executive, Johanna Contreras, was sworn in as acting county executive that day.

== U.S. House of Representatives (2022–present) ==
=== Elections ===
==== 2018 ====
Ryan first ran for the U.S. House of Representatives in 2018. In the Democratic primary in New York's 19th congressional district, he received 18% of the vote to Antonio Delgado's 22%. Delgado defeated incumbent Republican representative John Faso in the general election.

==== 2022 special ====
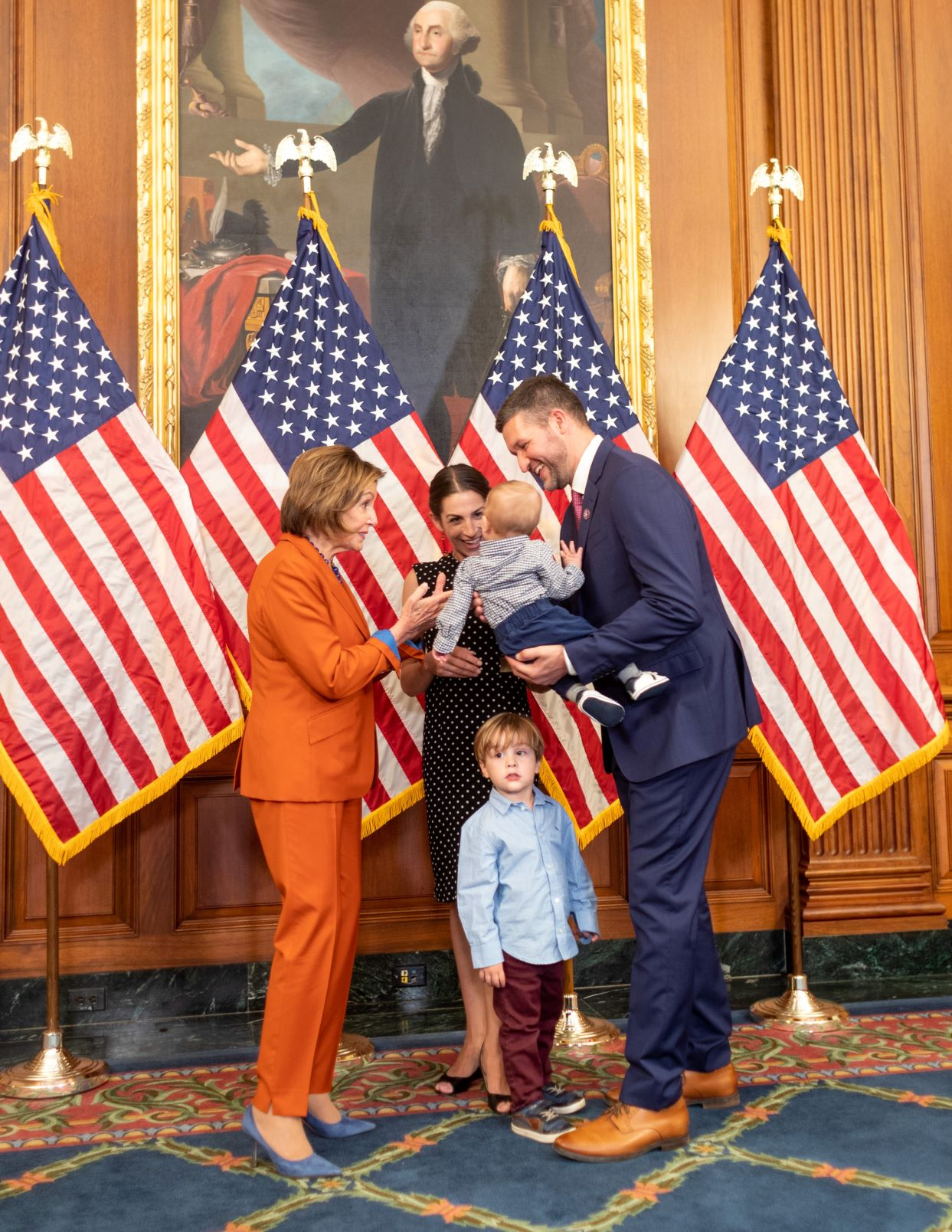
Ryan at his swearing into the 117th Congress, 2022

After Delgado resigned from Congress on May 25, 2022, to become lieutenant governor of New York, Ryan announced that he would run in the special election to succeed Delgado. Ryan was chosen as the Democratic nominee on June 9 at a meeting of Democratic county party chairs.

In the August 23 special election, Ryan faced the Republican nominee and Dutchess County Executive Marc Molinaro. Ryan narrowly defeated Molinaro by 2,858 votes, 51.1%–48.8%, which was considered an upset, having trailed Molinaro in polls leading up to the election. He outperformed Biden's 2020 margin in the district by 0.8%. In explaining his victory, political observers noted that Ryan campaigned strongly in favor of protecting abortion rights in the wake of the U.S. Supreme Court ruling in Dobbs v. Jackson Women's Health Organization, which overturned Roe v. Wade. His victory was attributed to college-educated voters', particularly women's, support for abortion rights.

Molinaro and Ryan both ran for Congress again in the general elections in November 2022 for the newly redrawn 19th and 18th districts, respectively. Each won in his respective district.

==== 2022 ====
In November 2022, Ryan contested the state's 18th district, which was changed from its previous configuration after redistricting. On the same day as his special election victory in the 19th district, Ryan won the Democratic nomination for the regular election in the 18th district. He defeated Republican nominee Colin Schmitt in the general election.

=== Tenure ===
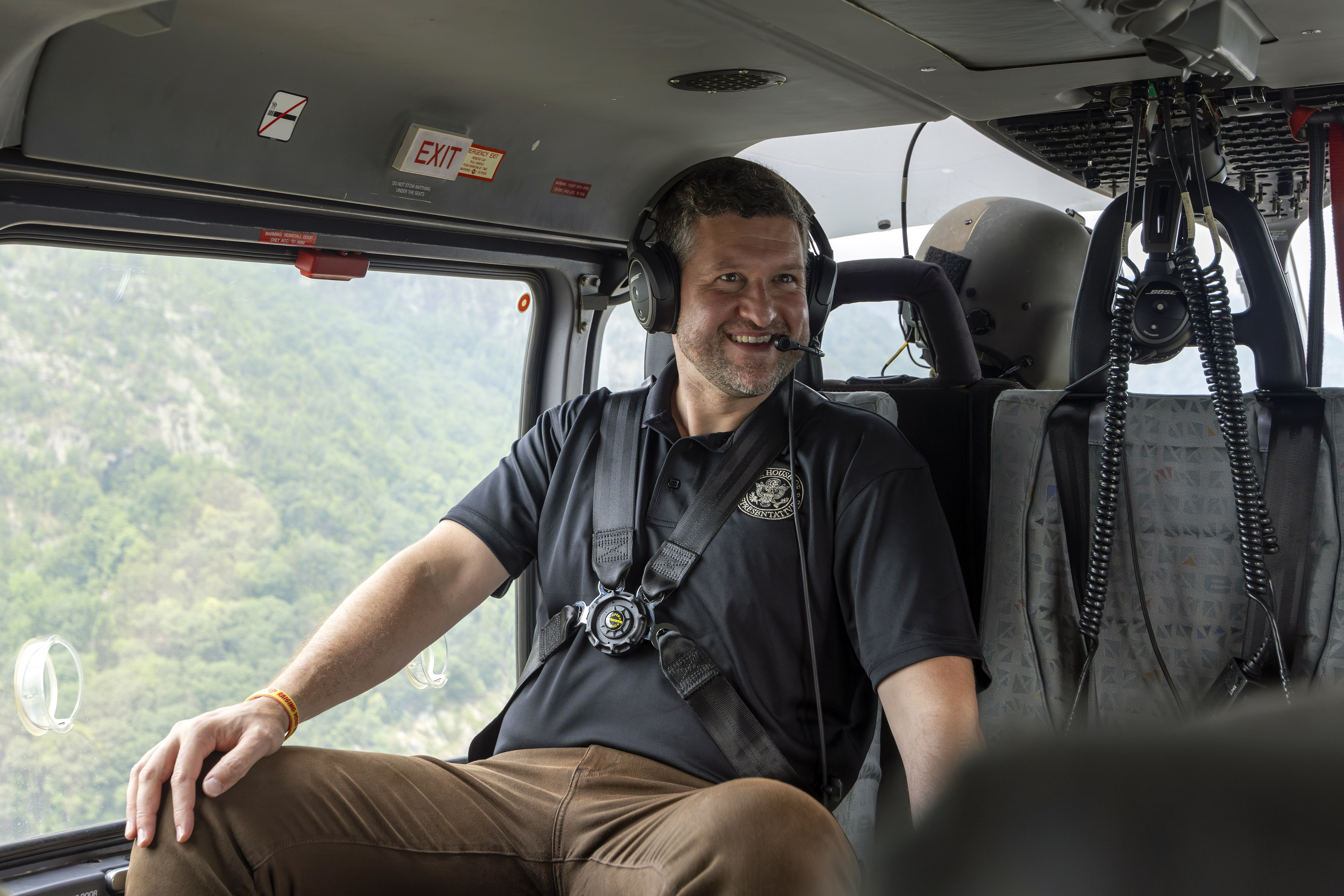
Ryan being given an aerial tour of West Point, New York, after the July 2023 Northeastern United States floods

Ryan was sworn into office on September 13, 2022, as the U.S. representative for New York’s 19th congressional district. During the 118th Congress, he was appointed to the House Committee on Armed Services. Two weeks into office, Ryan's first bill, the Expanding Home Loans for Guard and Reservists Act, passed the House with bipartisan support. The bill addressed a gap in VA loan eligibility for certain National Guard and Reserve members.

In February 2023, Ryan was among twelve Democrats to vote for a resolution to end COVID-19 national emergency. In July, following catastrophic flooding in his district in New York’s Hudson Valley, he assisted in local recovery efforts and coordinated with federal agencies to secure aid for affected communities, including West Point, which sustained severe damage.

Ryan is a staunch opponent of congestion pricing in the most congested parts of Manhattan.

On July 10, 2024, Ryan called for Joe Biden to withdraw from the 2024 United States presidential election.

On January 9, 2025, Ryan joined 44 other Democratic and 198 Republican representatives to pass the Illegitimate Court Counteraction Act. The Act, in response to the International Criminal Court (ICC) issuing warrants for Israeli officials, would impose sanctions on ICC officials who attempt to investigate, arrest, detain, or prosecute any protected person of the U.S. or its allies.

In March 2026, Ryan supported a War Powers resolution that would have required President Trump to obtain congressional approval to continue US military operations in Iran.

On July 15, 2026, Ryan supported Thomas Massie's Amendment to eliminate $3.3 billion in military aid to Israel, and announced he would return all AIPAC funds.

=== Committee assignments ===
Ryan's committee assignments for the 119th Congress include:

- Committee on Armed Services
  - Subcommittee on Cyber, Information Technologies, and Innovation
  - Subcommittee on Intelligence and Special Operations
- Committee on Transportation and Infrastructure
  - Subcommittee on Highways and Transit
  - Subcommittee on Railroads, Pipelines, and Hazardous Materials
  - Subcommittee Water Resources and Environment

=== Caucus memberships ===
Ryan's caucus memberships include:

- Congressional Equality Caucus
- New Democrat Coalition
- Defense Modernization Caucus (co-chair)
- Monopoly Busters Caucus (co-chair and co-founder)
- Gun Violence Prevention Task Force (vice chair)
- Labor Caucus
- Future Forum

== Personal life ==
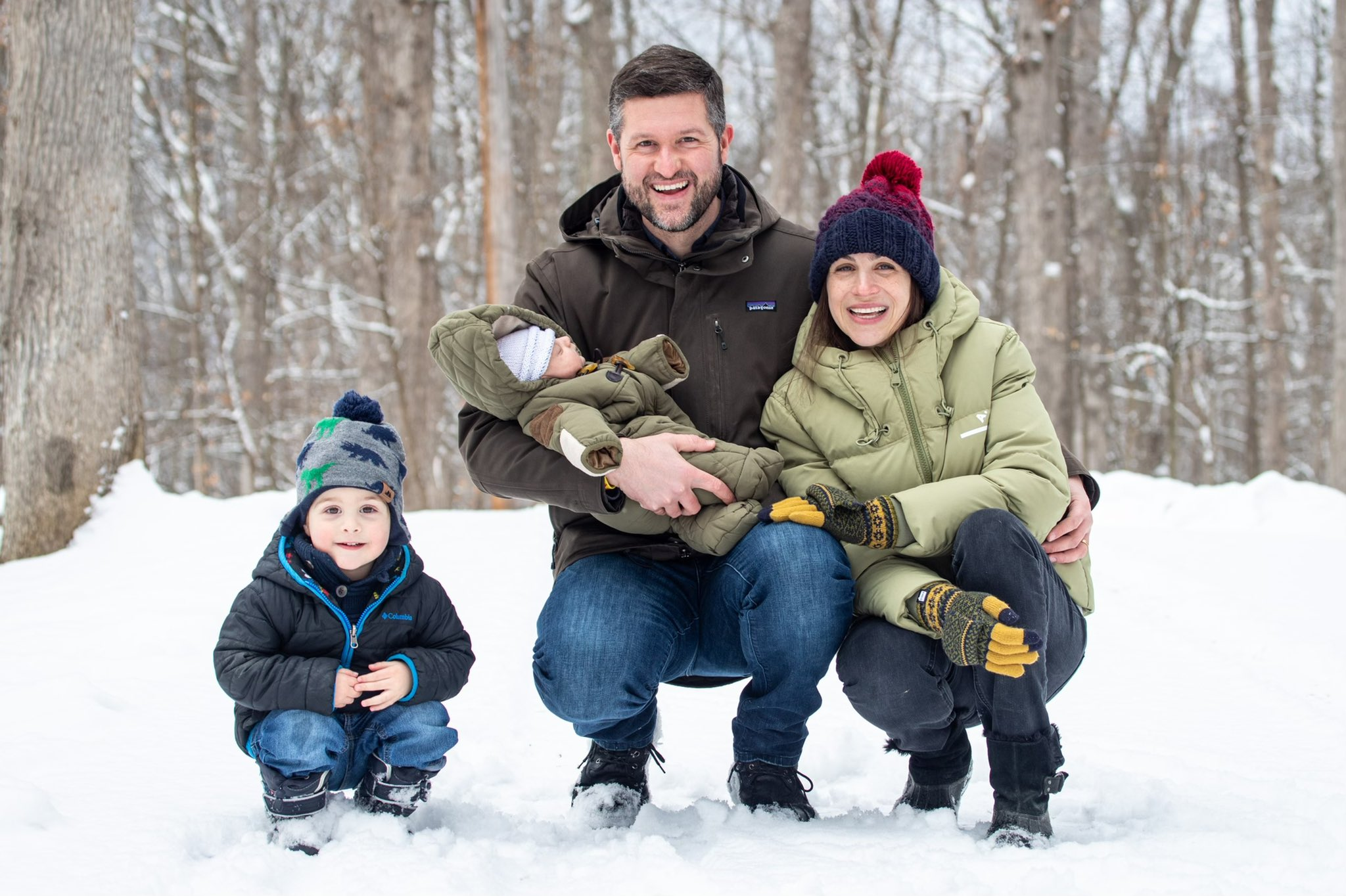
Ryan with his wife and two children

Ryan lives in Kingston with his wife, Rebecca Ryan (née Grusky). They married in 2015 and have two children. He was previously married. His grandfather served on the Kingston City Council. He is Catholic.

== Electoral history ==
New York's 19th congressional district Democratic primary, 2018
Party	Candidate	Votes	%
Democratic	Antonio Delgado	8,576	22.10%
Democratic	Pat Ryan	6,941	17.89%
Democratic	Gareth Rhodes	6,890	17.75%
Democratic	Brian Flynn	5,245	13.52%
Democratic	Jeff Beals	4,991	12.86%
Democratic	Dave Clegg	4,257	10.97%
Democratic	Erin Collier	1,908	4.92%
Total votes		38,808	100.00%

Ulster County executive special election, April 2019
Party	Candidate	Votes	%
Democratic	Pat Ryan	11,814	67.73%
Independence	Pat Ryan	1,006	5.77%
Total	Pat Ryan	12,820	73.50%
Republican	Jack Hayes	3,366	19.30%
Conservative	Jack Hayes	1,194	6.85%
Total	Jack Hayes	4,560	26.14%
Write-in		63	0.36%
Total votes		17,443	100.00%
Democratic hold			

Ulster County executive election, November 2019
Party	Candidate	Votes	%
Democratic	Pat Ryan	27,017	52.58%
Working Families	Pat Ryan	3,401	6.62%
Independence	Pat Ryan	1,960	3.81%
Total	Pat Ryan	32,378	63.01%
Republican	Jack Hayes	15,700	30.55%
Conservative	Jack Hayes	3,262	6.35%
Total	Jack Hayes	18,962	36.90%
Write-in		44	0.09%
Total votes		53,630	100.00%
Democratic hold			

2022 New York's 19th congressional district special election
Party	Candidate	Votes	%	±%
Democratic	Pat Ryan	58,636	45.39%	–2.61
Working Families	Pat Ryan	7,452	5.77%	–0.78
Total	Pat Ryan	66,088	51.15%	–3.64
Republican	Marc Molinaro	52,514	40.65%	–2.55
Conservative	Marc Molinaro	10,496	8.12%	N/A
Total	Marc Molinaro	63,010	48.77%	+5.57
Write-in		96	0.07%	N/A
Total votes		129,194	100.00%	
Turnout		129,328	27.16%	
Registered electors		476,134		
Democratic hold				

New York's 18th congressional district Democratic primary, 2022
Party	Candidate	Votes	%
Democratic	Pat Ryan	29,400	83.8%
Democratic	Aisha Mills	4,603	13.1%
Democratic	Moses Mugulusi	966	2.8%
Total votes		34,969	100%

New York's 18th congressional district, 2022
Party	Candidate	Votes	%
Democratic	Pat Ryan	123,168	46.15%
Working Families	Pat Ryan	12,077	4.52%
Total	Pat Ryan (incumbent)	135,245	50.67%
Republican	Colin Schmitt	116,972	43.83%
Conservative	Colin Schmitt	14,681	5.50%
Total	Colin Schmitt	131,653	49.33%
Total votes		266,898	100%

New York's 18th congressional district, 2024
Party	Candidate	Votes	%
Democratic	Pat Ryan	189,345	52.27%
Working Families	Pat Ryan	17,761	4.90%
Total	Pat Ryan (incumbent)	207,106	57.17%
Republican	Alison Esposito	138,409	38.21%
Conservative	Alison Esposito	16,720	4.62%
Total	Alison Esposito	155,129	42.83%
Total votes		362,235	100%

U.S. House of Representatives
Preceded by Antonio Delgado	Member of the U.S. House of Representatives from New York's 19th congressional district 2022–2023	Succeeded by Marc Molinaro
Preceded by Sean Patrick Maloney	Member of the U.S. House of Representatives from New York's 18th congressional district 2023-present	Incumbent
U.S. order of precedence (ceremonial)
Preceded by Brad Finstad	United States representatives by seniority 288th	Succeeded by Rudy Yakym
