= Antonio Delgado =

American attorney and politician (born 1977)

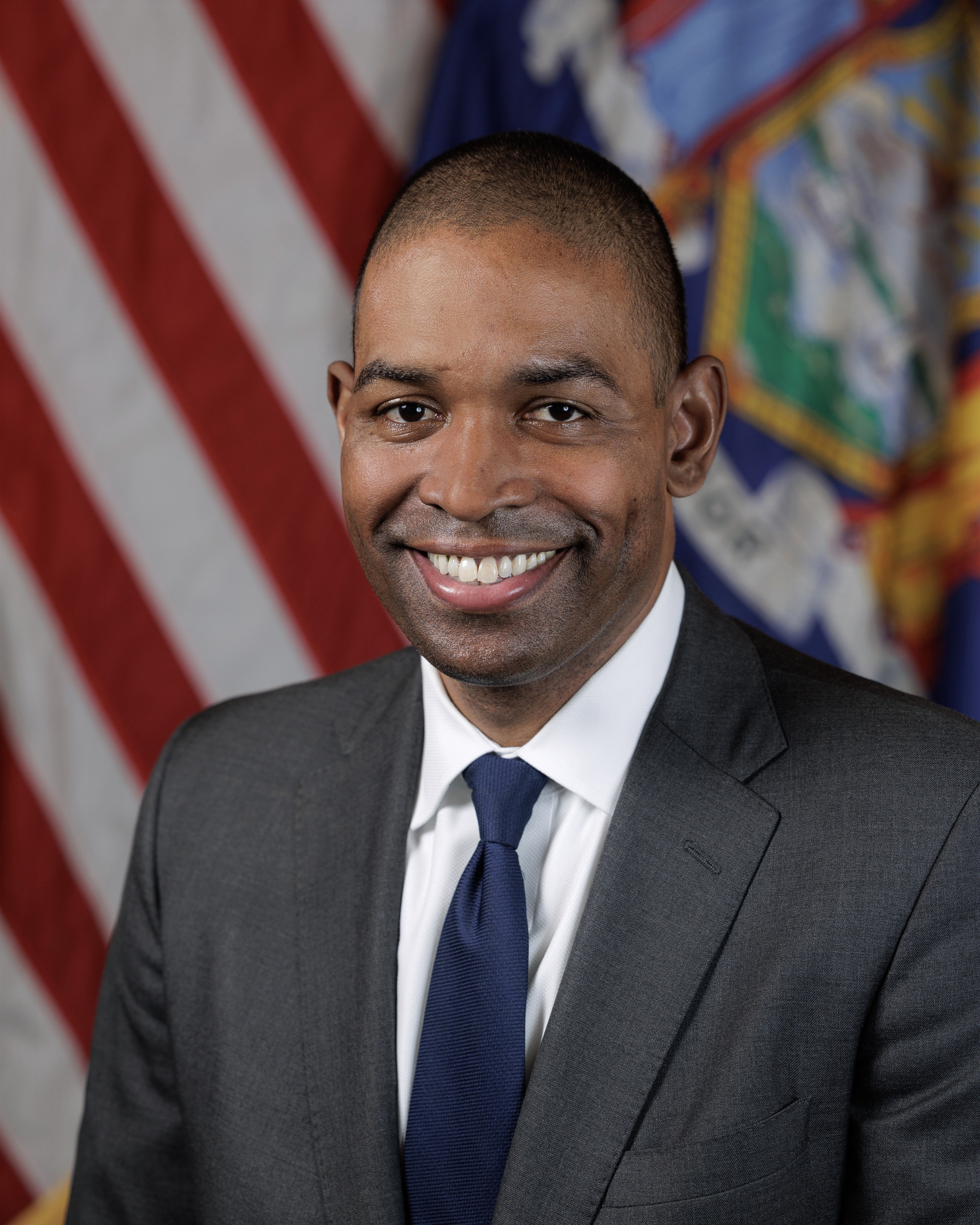
- Official portrait, 2024

Lieutenant Governor of New York
- Incumbent
- Assumed office May 25, 2022
- Governor: Kathy Hochul
- Preceded by: Andrea Stewart-Cousins (acting)

Member of the U.S. House of Representatives from New York's 19th district
- In office January 3, 2019 – May 25, 2022
- Preceded by: John Faso
- Succeeded by: Pat Ryan

Personal details
- Born: Antonio Ramon Delgado; January 28, 1977 (age 49) Schenectady, New York, U.S.
- Party: Democratic
- Spouse: Lacey Schwartz (m. 2011)
- Children: 2
- Education: Colgate University (AB); Queen's College, Oxford (MA); Harvard University (JD)
- Website: Office website

Antonio Ramon Delgado (born January 28, 1977) is an American attorney and politician serving as the lieutenant governor of New York since 2022. A member of the Democratic Party, Delgado served as the U.S. representative from New York's 19th congressional district from 2019 to 2022. He is the first African–American and the first person of Latino descent to be elected to Congress from Upstate New York as well as the first Latino to hold statewide office in New York.

On May 3, 2022, Governor Kathy Hochul announced that she had appointed Delgado to the then-vacant office of lieutenant governor of New York. On May 25, Delgado resigned from the House of Representatives and was sworn in as lieutenant governor. On November 8, he was elected to a full term as lieutenant governor. After public disagreements with Hochul, Delgado said in February 2025 that he would not seek reelection as lieutenant governor in 2026. In June 2025, he announced his candidacy for the 2026 Democratic nomination for governor of New York; he withdrew his candidacy in February 2026.

== Early life, education, and early career ==
Delgado was born on January 28, 1977, in Schenectady, New York, to Tony Delgado and Thelma P. Hill. He is African American and has Cape Verdean and Latino ancestry. Delgado has three younger brothers and grew up in Schenectady's Hamilton Hill neighborhood.

Delgado attended Notre Dame-Bishop Gibbons High School and played for the school's basketball team. In his senior year, The Daily Gazette named Delgado to its all-area second team. He then enrolled at Colgate University and played for the Colgate Raiders men's basketball team alongside future Golden State Warriors player Adonal Foyle. Delgado received a Bachelor of Arts degree from Colgate in 1999 and earned a Rhodes Scholarship to study at The Queen's College, Oxford, from which he received a Master of Arts in 2001. From 2001 to 2002, Delgado worked as the assistant director of admissions at Northfield Mount Hermon School in Massachusetts. In 2005, Delgado received his Juris Doctor from Harvard Law School.

After law school, Delgado moved to Los Angeles in 2005 and worked in the music industry. In 2007, he released a socially conscious rap album under the stage name "AD the Voice". He then worked as a litigator in the New York office of the law firm Akin Gump from 2011 to 2018.

== U.S. House of Representatives ==
=== Elections ===
==== 2018 ====
In the 2018 elections, Delgado ran for the United States House of Representatives in New York's 19th congressional district. He defeated six other candidates in the Democratic primary election and faced incumbent Republican John Faso in the November 6 general election.

During the campaign, Delgado criticized Faso for voting against the Affordable Care Act. Faso, alongside the Congressional Leadership Fund and the National Republican Congressional Committee, attacked Delgado's rap lyrics, saying they "paint an ugly and false picture of America", "denigrated our nation and the free enterprise system", and "often glorified pornography and drug use". The New York Times editorial board condemned the attacks as "race-baiting". Delgado said his lyrics were "being taken out of context in an attempt to 'otherize' him from voters" in his mostly white district.

Delgado won the general election with 132,001 votes to Faso's 124,408. He was sworn into office on January 3, 2019.

==== 2020 ====
Delgado ran for a second term in 2020. He was unopposed in the Democratic primary and defeated Republican nominee Kyle Van De Water, an attorney and former trustee of the village of Millbrook, New York, in the general election with 192,100 votes to Van De Water's 151,475.

=== Tenure ===
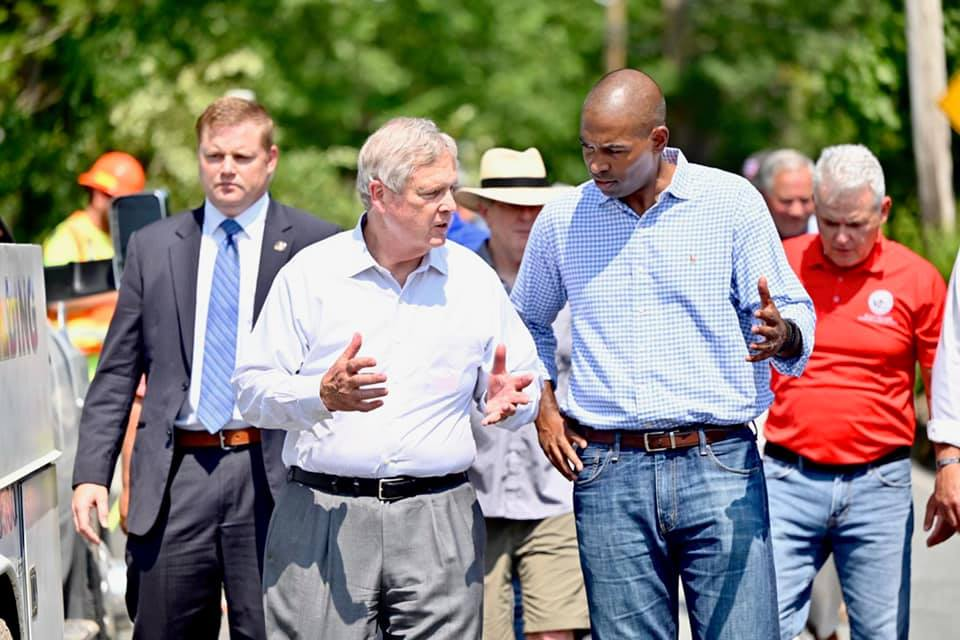
Delgado with Secretary of Agriculture Tom Vilsack in Rensselaer County after 2021 flooding

Delgado is the first person of either African–American or Latino descent to be elected to Congress from Upstate New York.

Delgado had 18 bills signed into law as a member of Congress, including the Small Business Relief Accessibility Act, the Strengthening Financial Aid for Students Act, the Improving Benefits for Underserved Veterans Act, and the Direct Support for Communities Act. He voted to impeach President Donald Trump in 2019 and again in 2021.

During the first 100 days of President Joe Biden's administration, Delgado voted in line with Biden's stated position 100% of the time.

Delgado left office in May 2022 to become lieutenant governor of New York.

=== Committee assignments ===
- Committee on Agriculture
  - Subcommittee on Biotechnology, Horticulture, and Research
  - Subcommittee on Commodity Exchanges, Energy, and Credit
- Committee on Small Business
  - Subcommittee on Economic Growth, Tax and Capital Access
- Committee on Transportation and Infrastructure
  - Subcommittee on Highways and Transit
  - Subcommittee on Water Resources and Environment

== Lieutenant Governor of New York ==
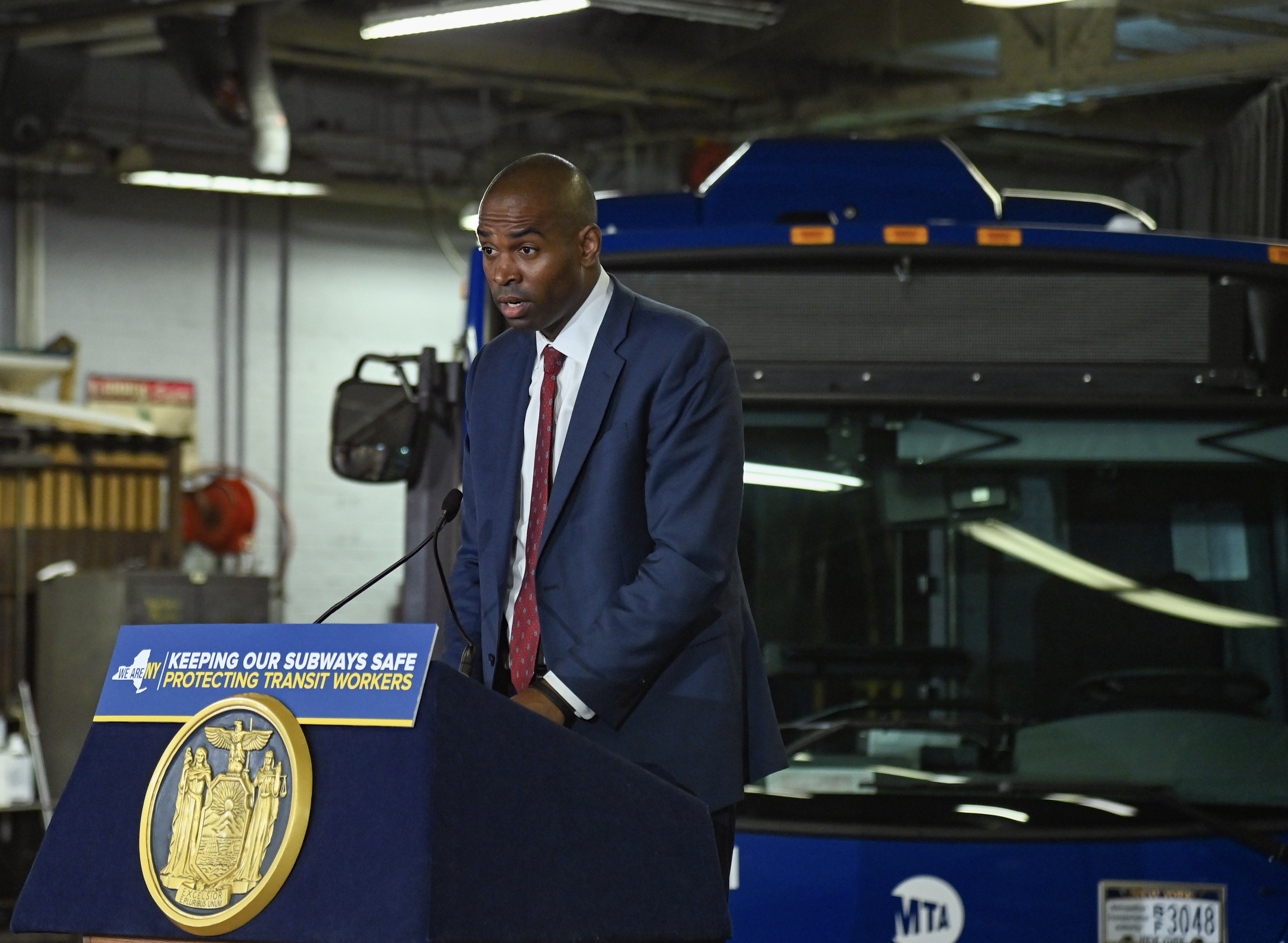
Delgado speaking at one of his first events as Lieutenant Governor of New York

On April 12, 2022, New York Lieutenant Governor Brian Benjamin resigned from office after being arrested in a corruption scandal. On May 3, 2022, New York Governor Kathy Hochul appointed Delgado lieutenant governor of New York. He was sworn in on May 25. Delgado is the first Latino to hold statewide office in New York.

Delgado won the Democratic primary election for lieutenant governor with 58% of the vote and appeared with Hochul on the general election ballot. Hochul and Delgado won the general election, defeating the Republican ticket of Lee Zeldin and Alison Esposito.

On July 2, 2024, Hochul announced that she would run for reelection in 2026 with Delgado as her running mate.

On July 10, 2024, Delgado called for President Joe Biden to withdraw from the 2024 United States presidential election. His position on this issue conflicted with Hochul's, as she continued to support Biden's candidacy.

On February 13, 2025, Delgado called for New York City Mayor Eric Adams to resign from office. Following Delgado's statement, Hochul's office said that Delgado "does not now and has not ever spoken on behalf of this administration". City & State New York reported that the "legal and leadership crisis in New York City" was "exposing the rift" between Hochul and Delgado.

On February 24, 2025, Delgado announced that he would not seek reelection as lieutenant governor in 2026 and would explore other options. Hochul's office responded that Hochul "had already begun taking steps to identify a new running mate for 2026".

In August 2025, Politico reported that Delgado had conducted little official business in his role as lieutenant governor since announcing a primary challenge to incumbent governor Kathy Hochul. Politico wrote, "Hochul has made sure Delgado has stayed far away: The governor this year reduced her hand-picked lieutenant's staff to one employee. She revoked his executive email account. And she even seized his cell phone."

== 2026 New York gubernatorial campaign ==
In June 2025, Delgado announced that he would challenge Hochul for the Democratic nomination for governor of New York in 2026. His candidacy was endorsed by Citizen Action, State Senator Jabari Brisport, and State Assembly member Emily Gallagher. On February 4, 2026, he announced nurse, union organizer, and socialist activist India Walton as his running mate. After failing to receive the endorsement of the Working Families Party or New York City Mayor Zohran Mamdani, Delgado ended his campaign on February 10.

== Electoral history ==
2018 Democratic primary results in New York's 19th congressional district
Party	Candidate	Votes	%
Democratic	Antonio Delgado	8,576	22.1
Democratic	Pat Ryan	6,941	17.9
Democratic	Gareth Rhodes	6,890	17.7
Democratic	Brian Flynn	5,245	13.5
Democratic	Jeff Beals	4,991	12.9
Democratic	David Clegg	4,257	11.0
Democratic	Erin Collier	1,908	4.9
Total votes		38,808	100.0

2018 general election results in New York's 19th congressional district
Party	Candidate	Votes	%
Democratic	Antonio Delgado	135,582	47.1
Working Families	Antonio Delgado	9,237	3.2
Women's Equality	Antonio Delgado	3,054	1.1
Total	Antonio Delgado	147,873	51.4
Republican	John Faso	112,304	39.0
Conservative	John Faso	16,906	5.9
Independence	John Faso	3,009	1.0
Reform	John Faso	654	0.2
Total	John Faso (incumbent)	132,873	46.1
Green	Steven Greenfield	4,313	1.5
Independent	Diane Neal	2,835	1.0
Total votes		287,894	100.0
Democratic gain from Republican			

2020 general election results in New York's 19th congressional district
Party	Candidate	Votes	%
Democratic	Antonio Delgado	168,281	48.0
Working Families	Antonio Delgado	22,969	6.6
SAM	Antonio Delgado	850	0.2
Total	Antonio Delgado (incumbent)	192,100	54.8
Republican	Kyle Van De Water	151,475	43.2
Libertarian	Victoria Alexander	4,224	1.2
Green	Steve Greenfield	2,799	0.8
Total votes		350,598	100.0
Democratic hold			

2022 New York gubernatorial election
Party	Candidate	Votes	%	±%
Democratic	Kathy Hochul; Antonio Delgado	2,879,092	48.77%	−7.39%
Working Families	Kathy Hochul; Antonio Delgado	261,323	4.43%	+2.55%
Total	Kathy Hochul (incumbent); Antonio Delgado (incumbent)	3,140,415	53.20%	−6.42%
Republican	Lee Zeldin; Alison Esposito	2,449,394	41.49%	+9.89%
Conservative	Lee Zeldin; Alison Esposito	313,187	5.31%	+1.15%
Total	Lee Zeldin; Alison Esposito	2,762,581	46.80%	+10.59%
Total votes		5,788,802	100.0%	
Turnout		5,902,996	47.74%	
Registered electors		12,124,242		
Democratic hold				

== Personal life ==
Delgado married Lacey Schwartz in 2011. They have twin sons and live in Rhinebeck, north of Poughkeepsie.

Delgado self-identifies as Afro-Latino. He is African American with Cape Verdean ancestry, and has also said he has Mexican, Colombian, and Venezuelan ancestry on his mother's side.

Delgado is 6 feet 4 inches (1.93 m) tall.

== See also ==
- List of African-American United States representatives
- List of Harvard University politicians
- List of Hispanic and Latino Americans in the United States Congress
- List of minority governors and lieutenant governors in the United States

U.S. House of Representatives
Preceded by John Faso	Member of the U.S. House of Representatives from New York's 19th congressional district 2019–2022	Succeeded by Pat Ryan
Political offices
Preceded by Andrea Stewart-Cousins; Acting	Lieutenant Governor of New York; 2022–present	Incumbent
Party political offices
Preceded by Kathy Hochul	Democratic nominee for Lieutenant Governor of New York; 2022	Succeeded by Adrienne Adams
U.S. order of precedence (ceremonial)
Preceded by Anthony Brindisi as Former U.S. Representative	Order of precedence of the United States as Former U.S. Representative	Succeeded by Max Rose as Former U.S. Representative
