= Angie Craig =

American politician (born 1972)

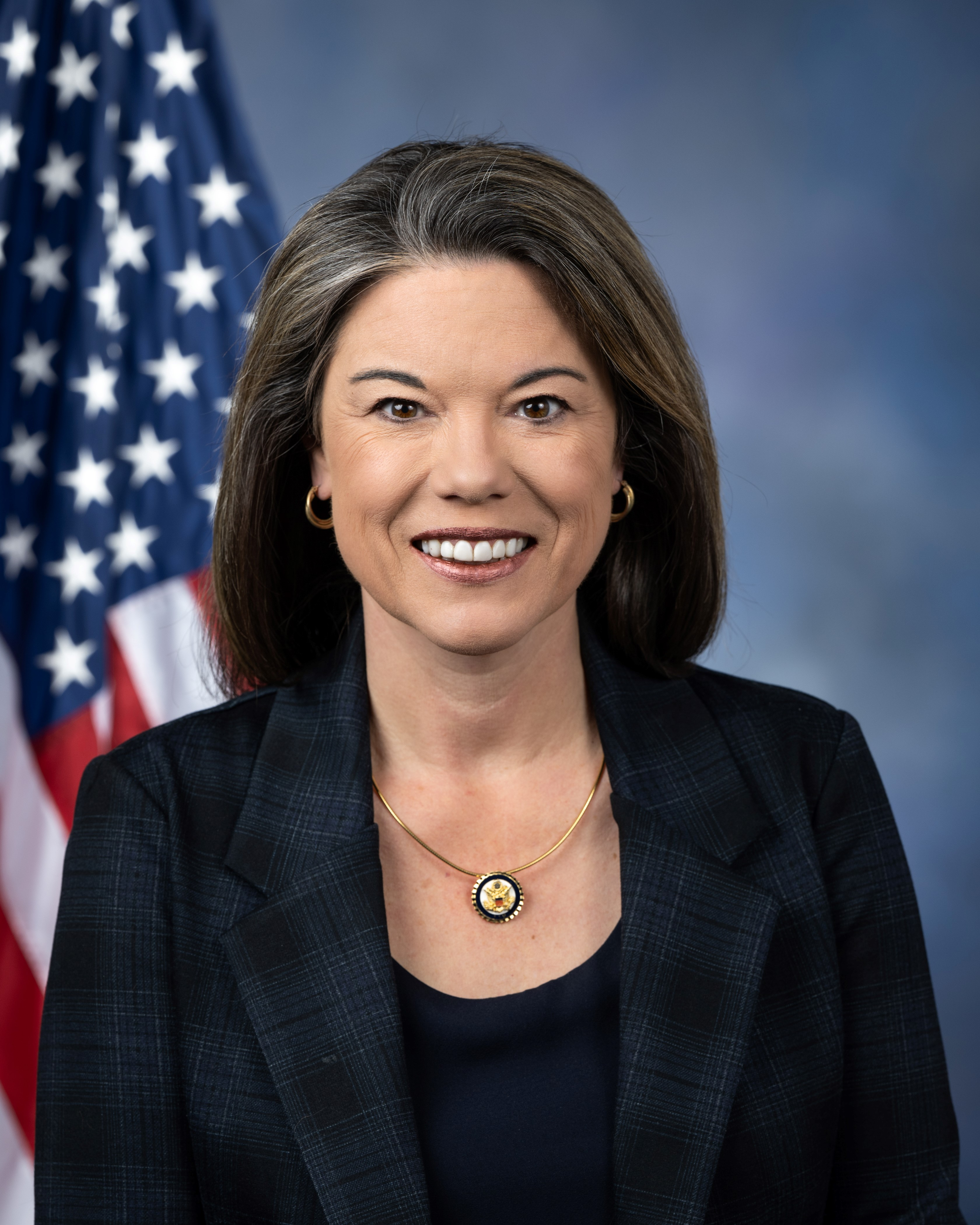
- Official portrait, 2025

Ranking Member of the House Agriculture Committee
- Incumbent
- Assumed office January 3, 2025
- Preceded by: David Scott

Member of the U.S. House of Representatives from Minnesota's 2nd district
- Incumbent
- Assumed office January 3, 2019
- Preceded by: Jason Lewis

Personal details
- Born: Angela Dawn Craig; February 14, 1972 (age 54) West Helena, Arkansas, U.S.
- Party: Democratic (DFL)
- Spouse: Cheryl Greene (m. 2008)
- Children: 4
- Education: University of Memphis (BA)
- Website: House website Campaign website
- Craig's voice Craig supporting price caps on insulin. Recorded March 31, 2022.

Angela Dawn Craig (born February 14, 1972) is an American politician, retired journalist, and former businesswoman. A member of the Democratic–Farmer–Labor Party (DFL), she has served as the U.S. representative for Minnesota's 2nd congressional district since 2019. The district includes most of the southern suburbs of the Twin Cities and outlying rural areas to the southwest.

Born and raised in Arkansas, Craig worked in journalism and corporate communications. She moved to Minnesota in 2005 for a job at St. Jude Medical. Craig first ran for Congress in 2016, narrowly losing to Jason Lewis, whom she defeated in their 2018 rematch.

Craig is the first openly LGBT+ member of Congress from Minnesota, and the first lesbian mother to serve in Congress. On April 29, 2025, she announced her candidacy for the United States Senate in the 2026 election to succeed Tina Smith. She lost the Democratic primary by approximately 20 points to Lieutenant Governor Peggy Flanagan on August 11, 2026.

== Early life and career ==
Craig was born in West Helena, Arkansas, in 1972. She graduated from Nettleton High School in Jonesboro, and earned a Bachelor of Arts in journalism from the University of Memphis.

After college, Craig interned at The Commercial Appeal, and became a full-time reporter. She lived in London from 2002 through 2005, and worked at St. Jude Medical in human resources and communications from 2005 to 2017.

== U.S. House of Representatives ==
=== Elections ===
==== 2016 ====
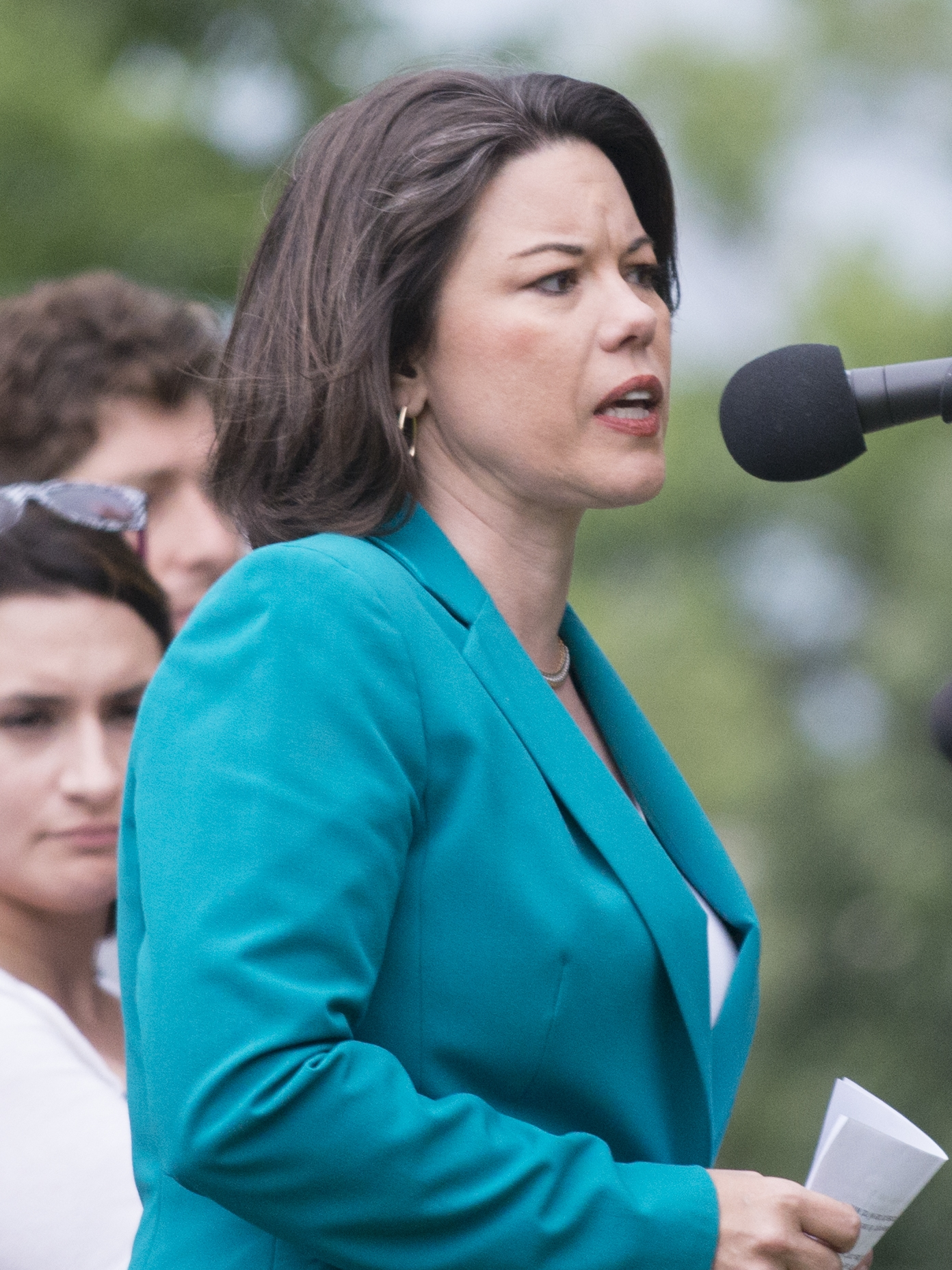
Angie Craig in 2016

In 2016, Craig ran for the United States House of Representatives in Minnesota's 2nd congressional district. She announced her candidacy before Republican incumbent John Kline announced his retirement. She faced no opposition in the Democratic primary. In the general election, she faced former conservative talk show host Jason Lewis. She lost by fewer than 7,000 votes.

==== 2018 ====
Craig sought a rematch with Lewis in 2018. As in 2016, she was unopposed in the Democratic primary. In the general election, she defeated Lewis, whose candor was felt to be his eventual undoing. Regarding slavery, for instance, he said in 2016, "If you don't want to own a slave, don't, but don't tell other people they can't."

Craig is the first openly gay mother to be elected to Congress, the first woman to be elected in Minnesota's 2nd district, and the first openly lesbian person elected to Congress from Minnesota. She received 52.6% of the vote, winning three of the six counties in the district. When she took office on January 3, 2019, she became the first DFLer to represent this district since it was reconfigured as a south suburban district in 2003.

==== 2020 ====
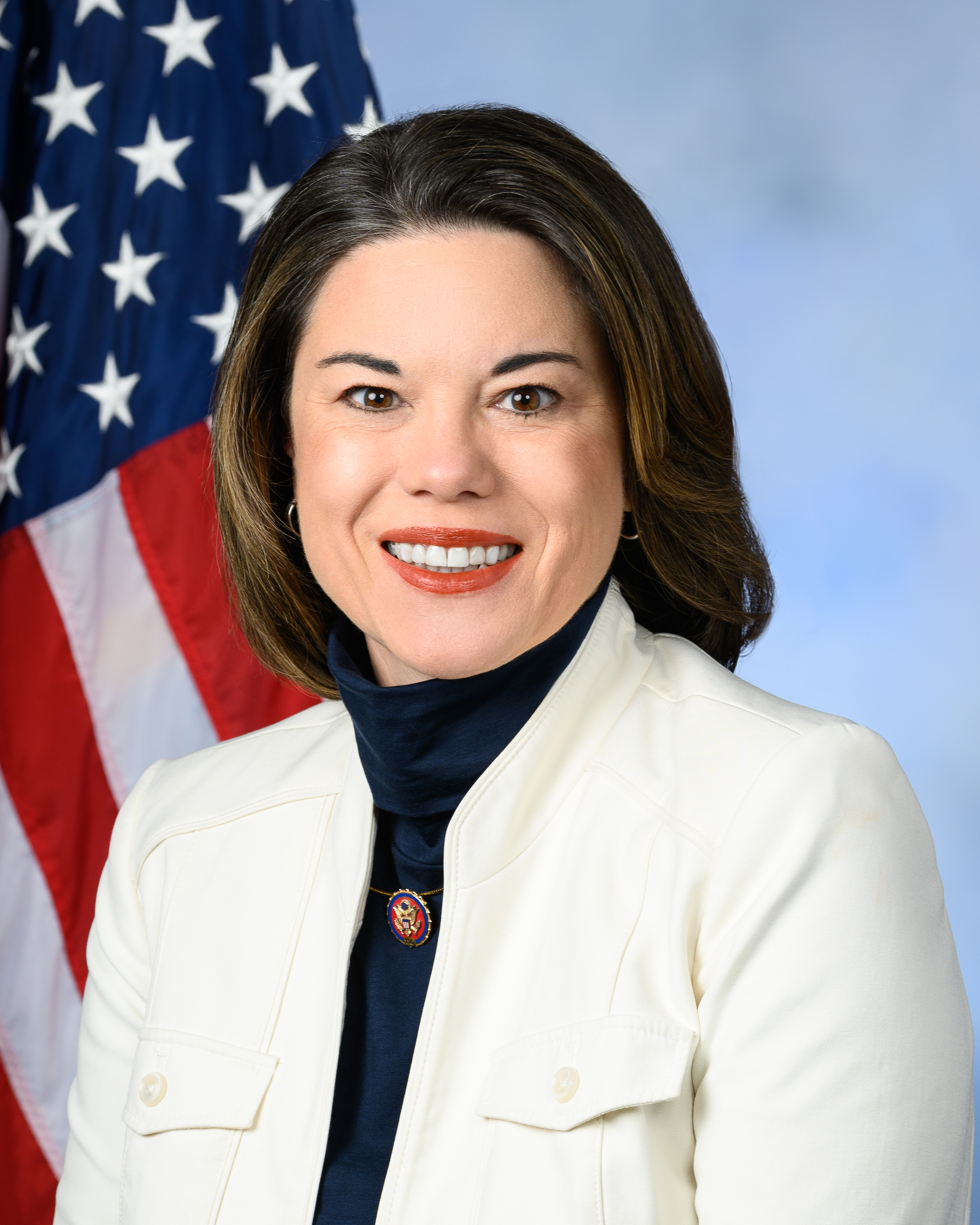
Craig in 2020

Legal Marijuana Now Party nominee Adam Weeks said that Republican operatives offered him $15,000 to run for Congress in the 2nd district in order to "pull votes away" from Craig. He said: "They want me to run as a third-party, liberal candidate, which I'm down. I can play the liberal, you know that." Leaders of prominent pro-marijuana legalization groups Minnesotans for Responsible Marijuana Regulation, Sensible Change Minnesota, and Minnesota NORML called the strategy "unconscionable".

In late September, Weeks died of a drug overdose. Minnesota law requires a special election if a major-party nominee dies within 79 days of Election Day. The law was enacted to prevent a repeat of the circumstances of the 2002 U.S. Senate election, in which incumbent Paul Wellstone died 11 days before the general election. Since the Legal Marijuana Now Party was a major party in Minnesota (because its 2018 candidate for state auditor won five percent of the vote), the 2nd District race was set to be postponed to February 9, 2021. Craig sued to keep the election on November 3, arguing that the requirement for a special election could leave the 2nd district without representation for almost a month, and also violated federal election law. Republican nominee Tyler Kistner joined the Minnesota Secretary of State as a defendant. The federal judge hearing the case ruled for Craig, noting that federal election law bars moving the date of House elections in all but a few circumstances. Kistner appealed to the Eighth Circuit Court of Appeals, which also sided with Craig. The appeals court held that the death of a candidate from a party with "modest electoral strength" could not justify postponing the election. After Kistner's appeal to the Supreme Court was rejected, the election was cleared to continue as scheduled on November 3. Craig won by a narrow margin.

==== 2022 ====
In the 2022 election, Craig defeated Republican nominee Tyler Kistner in a rematch of the 2020 election with 51% of the vote to Kistner's 46%.

==== 2024 ====
In the 2024 election, Craig defeated Republican nominee Joe Teirab with 55.5% of the vote to Teirab's 42.1%. Her performance in the district was the best showing for a DFLer since David Minge's election to his final term in 1998.

=== Tenure ===
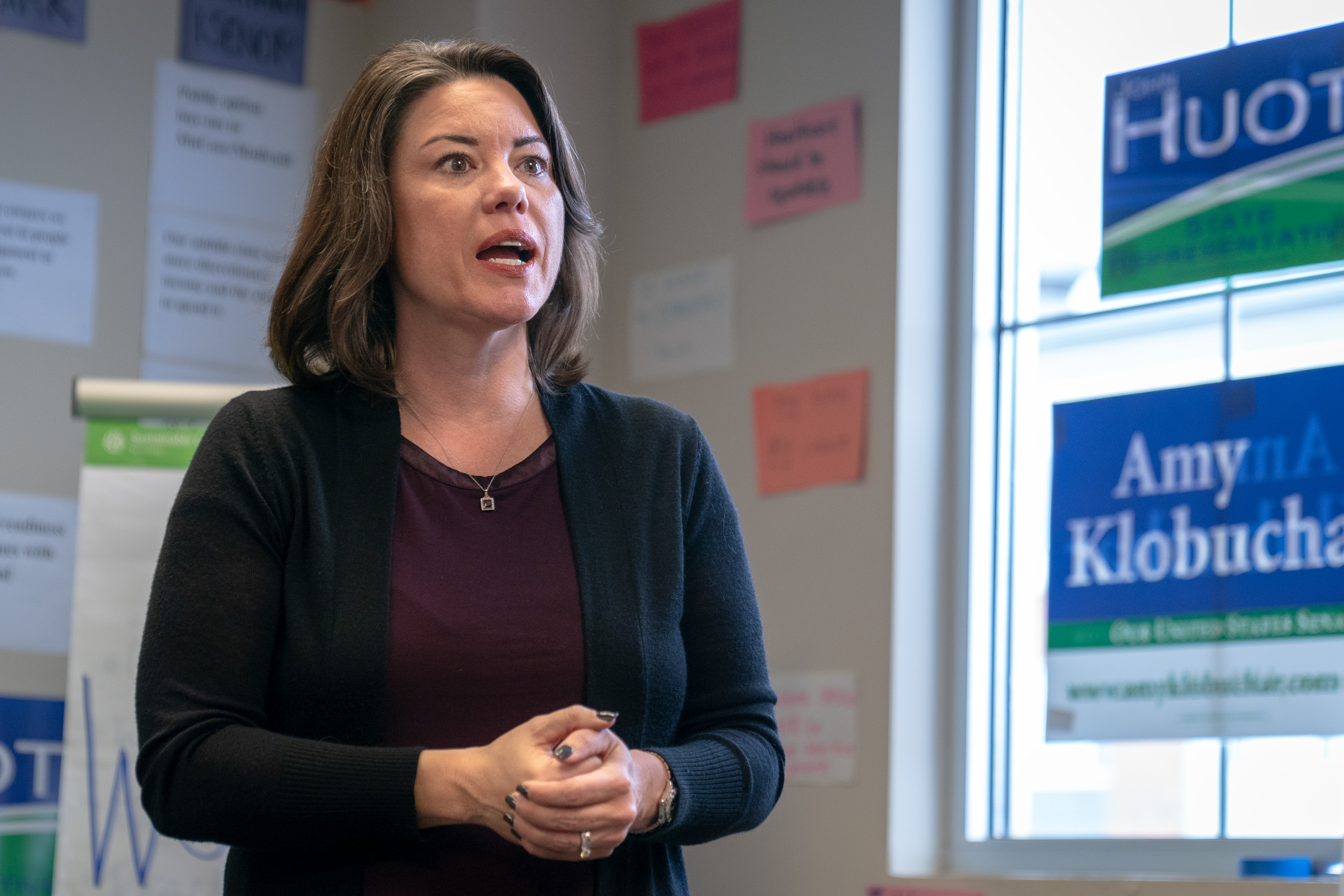
Craig at a campaign event in Apple Valley, Minnesota

According to the McCourt School of Public Policy at Georgetown University, Craig held a Bipartisan Index Score of 0.3 in the 116th United States Congress for 2019, placing her 114th out of 435 members.

On February 25, 2022, Craig introduced the Affordable Insulin Now Act, a bill intended to cap out-of-pocket insulin prices at $35 per month. The bill passed the House.

On April 27, 2023, Craig's congressional office announced that its staff would no longer be required to have bachelor's degrees.

Craig played a role in negotiations for the 2024 United States federal budget, in which the far-right Freedom Caucus has demanded deep spending cuts and refused to work with House Speaker Kevin McCarthy. In response to the intraparty dispute, on September 20, 2023, Craig introduced the MCCARTHY (My Constituents Cannot Afford Rebellious Tantrums, Handle Your Shutdown Act), which proposes that members' pay be withheld for each day that a federal government shutdown lasts.

=== Committee assignments ===
For the 119th Congress:

- Committee on Agriculture (Ranking Member) As Ranking Member of the committee, Craig is entitled to sit as an ex officio member in any subcommittee meeting, per the committee rules.

=== Caucus memberships ===
- Black Maternal Health Caucus
- Congressional LGBT Equality Caucus (co-chair)
- Congressional Motorcycle Caucus
- New Democrat Coalition
- House Pro-Choice Caucus
- Congressional Coalition on Adoption
- Problem Solvers Caucus

== 2026 U.S. Senate campaign ==
On April 29, 2025, Craig announced her candidacy for the United States Senate in the 2026 election to succeed Tina Smith.

The Democratic primary election between progressive Lieutenant Governor Peggy Flanagan and Craig, a moderate, was seen as a part of the national struggle between the Democratic Party's progressive and moderate factions after the 2024 U.S. elections, with endorsements split by ideology.

Craig reportedly had the private backing of the Democratic Senate leadership, including Chuck Schumer, Kirsten Gillibrand, and the Democratic Senatorial Campaign Committee (DSCC), but they did not endorse her.

Flanagan defeated Craig by twenty points in the August 2026 Democratic primary.

== Political positions ==
Craig has self-identified and been described as a centrist moderate Democrat. She co-chaired the centrist New Democrat Coalition.

During Donald Trump's first presidency, Craig voted in line with Trump's stated position 5.5% of the time. In the 117th Congress, she voted in line with Joe Biden's stated position 100% of the time. Craig broke more frequently with the Biden administration in 2023, voting in line with the president's positions 70.6% of the time, the fifth-lowest rate of any House member in the Democratic caucus. On July 6, 2024, Craig called for Biden not to run for reelection. She was the first battleground district member to do so.

In December 2024, Craig became the first openly LGBTQ+ person and first woman to serve as the ranking member of the House Agriculture Committee.

=== COVID-19 pandemic ===
On February 1, 2023, Craig was one of 12 Democrats to vote for a resolution to end the COVID-19 national emergency.

=== Cryptocurrency ===
The pro-crypto super PAC Fairshake spent more than $1.1 million to boost Craig's 2024 reelection campaign. It was the second-biggest spender in her district. Craig sits on the Agriculture Committee panel with jurisdiction over the Commodity Futures Trading Commission (CFTC), which plays a role in regulating cryptocurrency. She earned the rating "strongly supports crypto" from the cryptocurrency advocacy group Stand With Crypto. Craig has said digital assets will have "a major role in the next wave of technological innovation globally".

=== Israel ===
Since 2018, Craig's campaign has received over $800,000 in money linked to AIPAC, a pro-Israel lobby group. Craig voted to provide Israel with support following the 2023 October 7 attacks. In May 2024, Craig was one of the 16 Democrats who voted with Republicans to stop the Biden administration from withholding military aid to Israel. In September 2024, AIPAC bundled more than $200,000 to support her campaign and praised her "solid commitment" to the U.S.-Israel relationship. In July 2026, Craig voted against an amendment to end $3.3 billion in annual US funding for Israel for military support.

=== Immigration ===
In 2025, Craig was one of 46 House Democrats who joined Republicans to vote for the Laken Riley Act, requiring mandatory detention without bail of undocumented immigrants charged with a crime, even if they are not convicted. In 2026, she said she regretted that vote. She also voted for a June resolution, breaking with Democrats, condemning the 2025 Boulder fire attack as antisemitic, which included an expression of gratitude to ICE personnel, for defending the "homeland" and called for local and state collaboration with ICE. Craig called the latter a measure designed to divide Democrats but said she supported it due to her opposition to antisemitism.

After the killing of Renée Good by an ICE agent, Craig said she stood by her votes while also criticizing ICE's actions as going beyond the law. She also responded to criticism from her 2026 Senate Democratic primary opponent Peggy Flanagan, saying, "Peggy Flanagan is twisting this and trying to create some sort of political advantage in a Senate race in a way that is disgusting". Craig and Minnesota Representatives Kelly Morrison and Ilhan Omar requested a tour of an ICE detention facility three days after the shooting, which was denied despite their oversight authority as members of Congress. After a confrontation with Republican majority whip Tom Emmer about Good's death, Craig called for congressional Republicans to stand up to the Trump administration, calling ICE's actions "horrific overreach".

=== Other positions ===
In 2024, Craig brought the Minnesota Police and Peace Officers Association's (MPPOA) executive director as her guest to the State of the Union address, citing the 2024 Burnsville shooting that occurred in her district.

Craig initially supported a 2024 bill that would have allowed the U.S. treasury secretary to revoke the nonprofit, tax-exempt status of groups suspected of providing "material support or resources" to terrorist organizations due to provisions granting tax leeway to Americans held hostage overseas, but she later voted against the bill due to concern about potential abuse by the incoming Trump administration.

Craig has publicly criticized Elon Musk. After receiving $10,000 in contributions from SpaceX's PAC in 2024, she donated the contributions to Every Third Saturday, a veterans' organization.

== Electoral history ==
2026 United States Senate Democratic–Farmer–Labor primary results
Party	Candidate	Votes	%
Democratic (DFL)	Peggy Flanagan	411,854	59.0
Democratic (DFL)	Angie Craig	274,920	39.4
Democratic (DFL)	Kurt Michael Anderson	4,521	0.6
Democratic (DFL)	Billy Nord	2,896	0.4
Democratic (DFL)	George H. Kalberer	2,076	0.3
Democratic (DFL)	Peter John Murgic	1,661	0.2
Total votes		697,928	100.0

Minnesota's 2nd congressional district, 2024
Party	Candidate	Votes	%
Democratic (DFL)	Angie Craig (incumbent)	231,751	55.53%
Republican	Joe Teirab	175,621	42.08%
Constitutional conservative	Tom Bowman (withdrawn)	9,492	2.27%
Write-in		455	0.11%
Total votes		417,319	100.00%
Democratic (DFL) hold			

Minnesota's 2nd congressional district, 2022
Party	Candidate	Votes	%
Democratic (DFL)	Angie Craig (incumbent)	165,581	50.87%
Republican	Tyler Kistner	148,578	45.65%
Legal Marijuana Now	Paula Overby	10,730	3.30%
	Write-in	585	0.18%
Total votes		325,474	100.00%
Democratic (DFL) hold			

Minnesota's 2nd congressional district, 2020
Party	Candidate	Votes	%
Democratic (DFL)	Angie Craig (incumbent)	204,031	48.18%
Republican	Tyler Kistner	194,466	45.92%
Legal Marijuana Now	Adam Weeks	24,693	5.83%
	Write-in	270	0.06%
Total votes		423,460	100.00%
Democratic (DFL) hold			

Minnesota's 2nd congressional district, 2018
Party	Candidate	Votes	%
Democratic (DFL)	Angie Craig	177,958	52.66%
Republican	Jason Lewis (incumbent)	159,344	47.15%
	Write-in	666	0.20%
Total votes		337,968	100.00%
Democratic (DFL) gain from Republican			

Minnesota's 2nd congressional district, 2016
Party	Candidate	Votes	%
Republican	Jason Lewis	173,970	46.95%
Democratic (DFL)	Angie Craig	167,315	45.16%
Independence	Paula Overby	28,869	7.79%
	Write-in	360	0.10%
Total votes		370,514	100.00%
Republican hold			

== Personal life ==
In 1997, Craig fought for custody of her adopted son in Tennessee.

In 2020, Craig moved to Prior Lake, Minnesota, after living in Eagan, Minnesota, for nearly 10 years. She and her wife, Cheryl Greene, married in 2008, and have four sons, who were teenagers during her first run for Congress in 2016.

Craig is a Lutheran.

On February 9, 2023, Craig was physically assaulted in the elevator of her Washington, D.C. apartment building. She escaped after throwing hot coffee in the assailant's face. The man who assaulted her was sentenced to 27 months in prison.

== See also ==
- List of LGBT members of the United States Congress
- Women in the United States House of Representatives

U.S. House of Representatives
Preceded by Jason Lewis	Member of the U.S. House of Representatives from Minnesota's 2nd congressional district 2019–present	Incumbent
Preceded by David Scott	Ranking Member of the House Agriculture Committee; 2025–present	Incumbent
U.S. order of precedence (ceremonial)
Preceded by Ben Cline	United States representatives by seniority 193rd	Succeeded by Dan Crenshaw
