= Political positions of Kevin McCarthy =

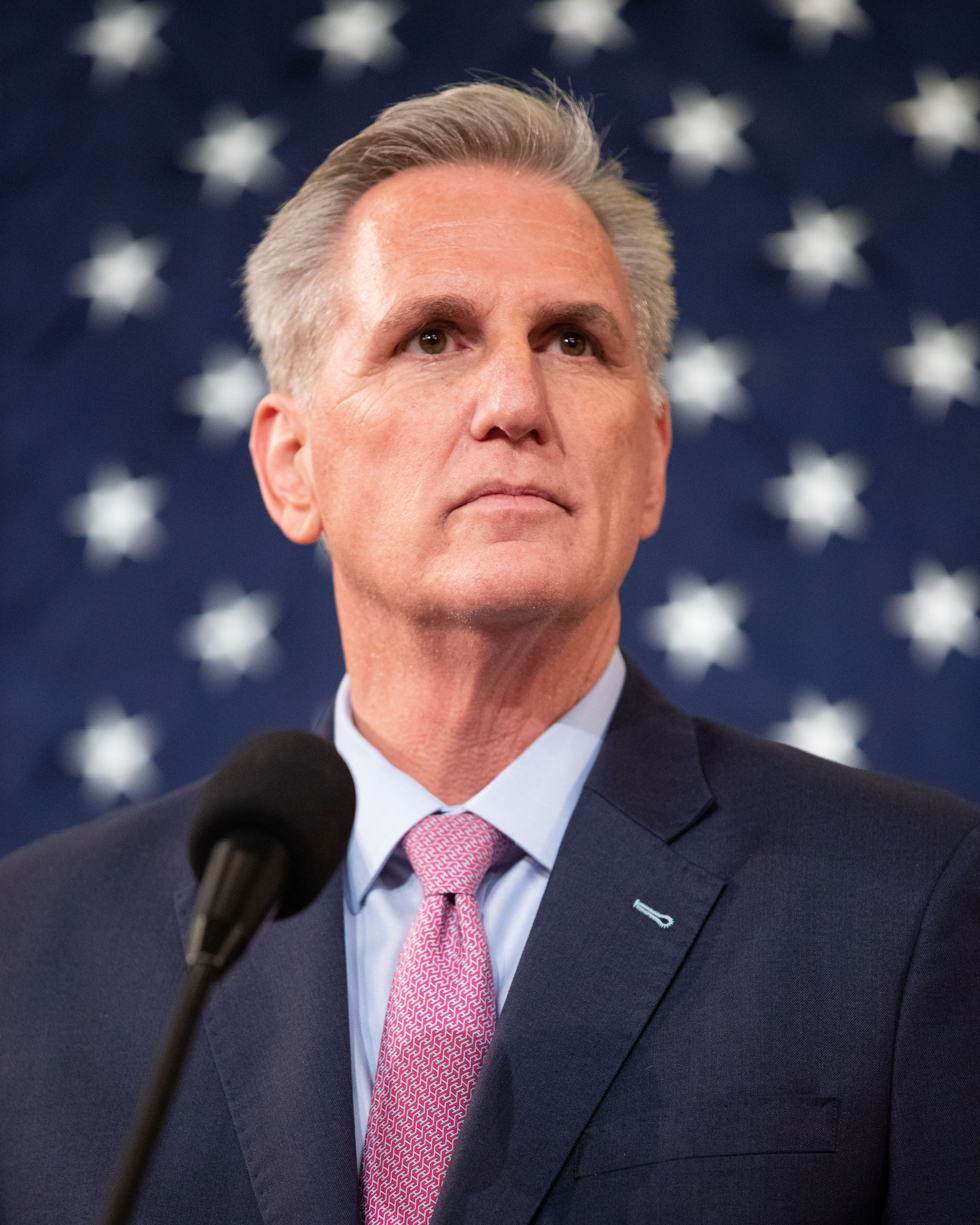
McCarthy in 2023

Kevin McCarthy is an American politician who served as the 55th speaker of the United States House of Representatives. Below is a list of his political positions.

== Political positions ==
=== Abortion ===
In 2003, while minority leader in the state assembly, McCarthy "support[ed] most abortion rights, but oppose[d] spending tax dollars on abortions". By 2015, McCarthy was, according to The Washington Post, "a staunch anti-abortion-rights advocate". McCarthy supports the Hyde Amendment (a provision, annually renewed by Congress since 1976, that bans federal funds for abortion, except to save the life of the woman, or if the pregnancy arises from incest or rape), and in 2011 co-sponsored a bill, the "No Taxpayer Funding for Abortion Act", to make the Hyde Amendment permanent. This bill was especially controversial because it provided an exemption for funding terminations of pregnancies caused by only "forcible rape", which prompted abortion-rights activists to call the bill a redefinition of rape. McCarthy opposes a California state law that requires health insurance plans "to treat abortion coverage and maternity coverage neutrally and provide both" on the grounds that the law violates the Weldon Amendment and other federal laws.

McCarthy has voted to strip about $500 million in federal funding for Planned Parenthood.

=== COVID-19 ===
On September 17, 2020, McCarthy voted against House Resolution 908 to condemn racism against Asian-Americans related to the COVID-19 pandemic. He said the resolution was "a waste of time", and "At the heart of this resolution is the absurd notion that referring to the virus as a Wuhan virus or the China virus is the same as contributing to violence against Asian Americans."

=== Donald Trump ===
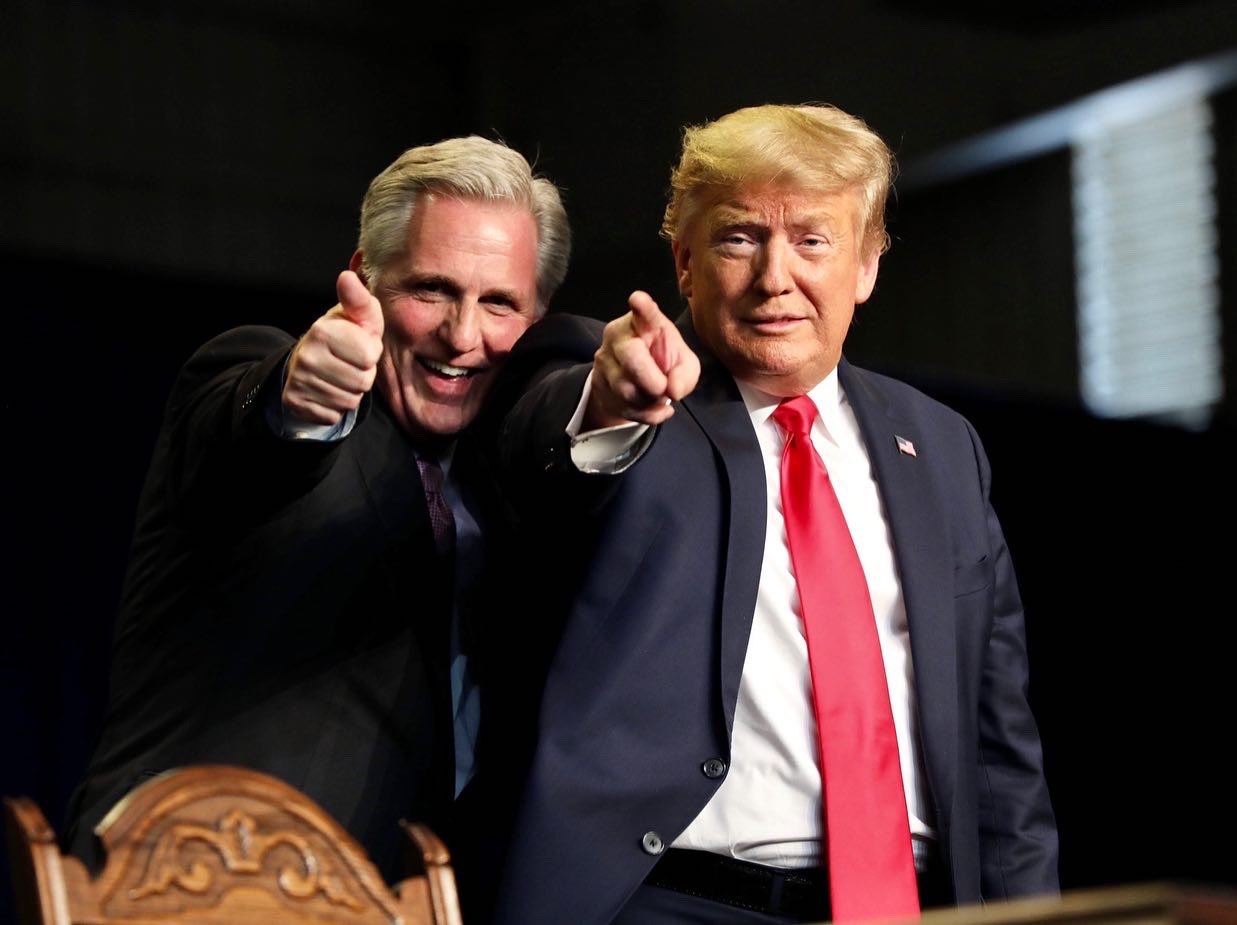
McCarthy with Donald Trump in Bakersfield, California, in 2019

McCarthy was an early supporter of Trump in the 2016 Republican presidential primaries, saying that Trump's "intensity" could help the Republicans win House seats. McCarthy also suggested in a private recording with GOP House leadership in 2016 that Putin pays Trump, which McCarthy said was a joke gone wrong.

After the 2018 midterm elections, in which Democrats won a majority in the House, McCarthy said that Democrats should not investigate Trump. He described investigations of Trump as a "small agenda" and that "America's too great of a nation to have such a small agenda." He said that Trump had already been investigated "for a long period of time". McCarthy and other House Republicans investigated Hillary Clinton for years over the 2012 Benghazi attack. In 2015, McCarthy said that the investigation, which found no evidence of wrongdoing on Clinton's part, had hurt poll numbers.

In 2019, McCarthy defended government officials spending money at resorts Trump owned. He said there was no difference between government officials spending money at hotels Trump owned and other hotels.

In October 2019, McCarthy said "there's nothing that the president did wrong" in regard to Trump requesting that Ukrainian President Volodymyr Zelenskyy investigate 2020 Democratic presidential candidate Joe Biden. McCarthy added: "The president wasn't investigating a campaign rival. The president was trying to get to the bottom, just as every American would want to know, why did we have this Russia hoax that actually started within Ukraine."

That same month, when Trump said "China should start an investigation into the Bidens", McCarthy shortly thereafter went on Fox & Friends to say, "You watch what the president said—he's not saying China should investigate."

=== Capitol riot and reaction ===
In 2021, of the attack on the United States Capitol on January 6, McCarthy said that "as a nation", "we all have some responsibility" for the event. McCarthy had been among those Republicans who in the weeks before the attack on the Capitol had spread false claims about the validity of the presidential election. On January 13, McCarthy said that Trump "bears responsibility for Wednesday's attack on Congress by mob rioters. He should have immediately denounced the mob when he saw what was unfolding." McCarthy did not vote to impeach Trump for a second time, instead calling for a censure resolution against Trump for his role in the attack. On January 21, McCarthy said he did not think that Trump "provoked" the attack. Two days later, McCarthy said that Trump "had some responsibility when it came to the response", and then stressed his original position that all Americans have "some responsibility". Republicans have criticized McCarthy for inconsistent statements about Trump after the attack. Despite the condemnation, McCarthy visited Trump at his Mar-a-Lago resort to discuss the future of the Republican Party. McCarthy released a statement that read in part, "Today, President Trump committed to helping elect Republicans in the House and Senate in 2022".

It was reported on February 12 that McCarthy called Trump asking for help during the riot. Trump refused to send the National Guard, saying, "Well, Kevin, I guess these people are more upset about the election than you are." McCarthy responded, "Who the fuck do you think you are talking to?" This was reported to CNN by multiple Republican members of Congress, including Jaime Herrera Beutler and Anthony Gonzalez.

On May 19, 2021, McCarthy and all the other Republican House leaders in the 117th Congress voted against establishing the January 6 commission. Thirty-five Republican House members and all 217 Democrats present voted to establish such a commission.

=== Environment ===
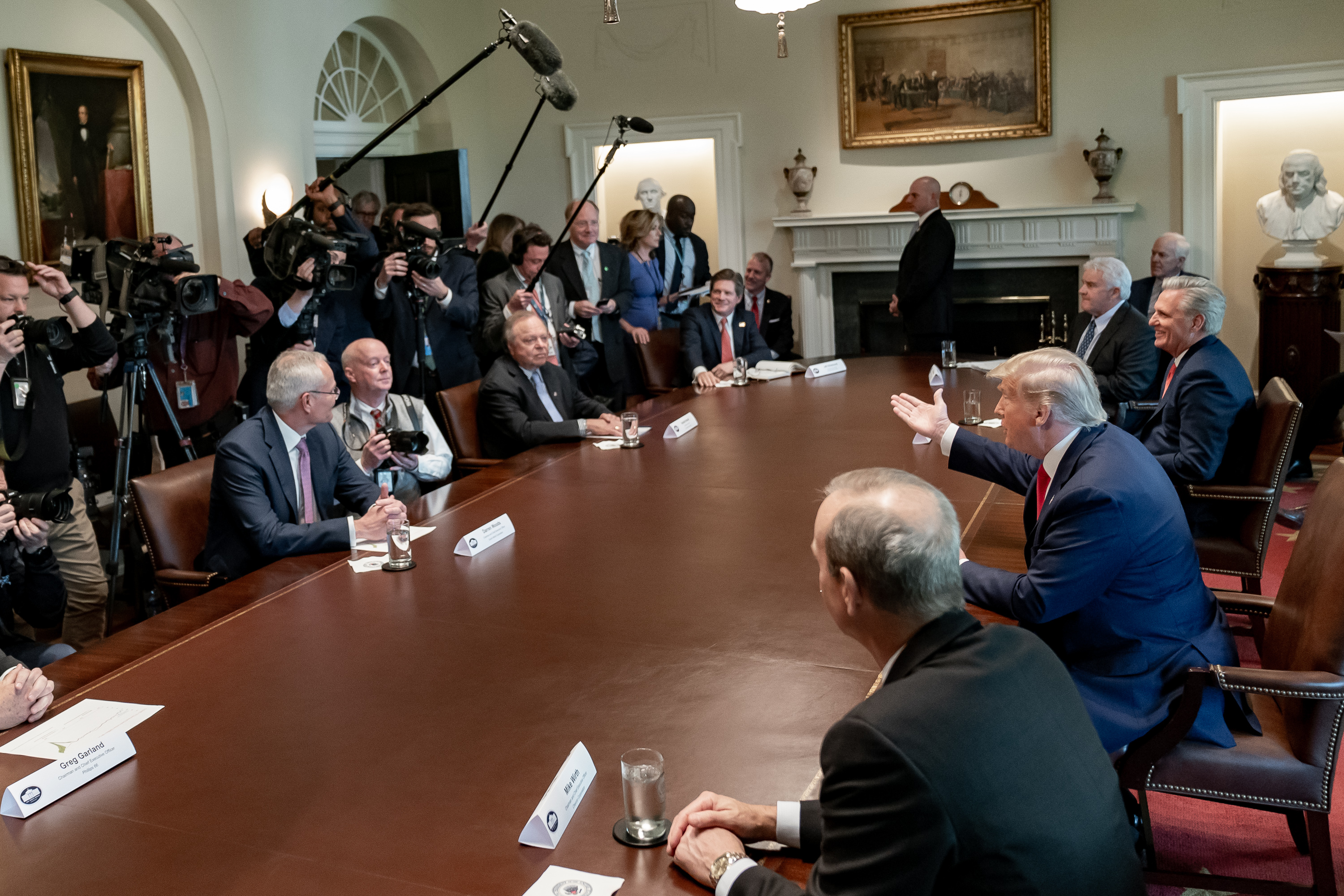
President Trump and McCarthy meeting with energy sector executives in April 2020

McCarthy has been frequently at odds with environmental groups; the League of Conservation Voters has given him a lifetime score of 4%, as of 2021. McCarthy does not accept the scientific consensus on climate change, as of 2014. He was a major opponent of President Barack Obama's Clean Power Plan to reduce emissions of greenhouse gas from coal-fired power plants. He has opposed regulations on methane leaks from fossil-fuel drilling facilities, calling them "bureaucratic and unnecessary." In 2015, McCarthy opposed the U.S.'s involvement in global efforts to combat climate change; as the 2015 United Nations Climate Change Conference began, he announced that he would oppose an international agreement on climate change. In 2017, McCarthy led House Republican efforts to use the Congressional Review Act to undo a number of environmental regulations enacted during the Obama administration. McCarthy once supported the federal wind-energy production tax credit, but opposed its extension in 2014.

In 2011, McCarthy was the primary author of the "Wilderness and Roadless Area Release Act" (H.R. 1581), legislation that would remove protected status designation from 60 million acres of public lands. Under the bill, protections for roadless and wilderness study areas would be eliminated, and vast swaths of land opened to new industrial development (such as logging, mineral extraction, and fossil fuel extraction). Conservationist groups and former Secretary of the Interior Bruce Babbitt strongly criticized the bill.

More recently, as House minority leader, McCarthy proposed several environmental bills designed to address climate change that have been called "narrow" and "modest". They include provisions to extend a tax credit for carbon capture technologies and to plant trees. Responses from Republican representatives were mixed. Conservative groups including the Club for Growth, the Competitive Enterprise Institute, and the American Energy Alliance opposed the measures, while others, such as ClearPath, supported them. McCarthy believes that younger voters are worried about climate change and cautioned that Republicans are risking their viability in elections over the long term by ignoring or denying the issue. He has said, "We've got to actually do something different than we've done to date [concerning climate change]. For a 28-year-old, the environment is the No. 1 and No. 2 issue."

=== Finance ===
In 2014, McCarthy opposed the renewal of the charter of the Export-Import Bank of the United States, as he expects the private sector to take over the role.

=== Foreign policy ===
On June 15, 2016, McCarthy told a group of Republicans, "There's two people I think Putin pays: Rohrabacher and Trump. Swear to God." Paul Ryan reminded colleagues the meeting was off the record, saying, "No leaks. This is how we know we're a real family here." When asked about the comment, McCarthy's spokesman said, "the idea that McCarthy would assert this is absurd and false." After a tape of the comment was made public in May 2017, McCarthy claimed it was "a bad attempt at a joke".

McCarthy received donations from pro-Israel groups in the 2018 United States elections. He is also Congress's top recipient of campaign contributions from Saudi lobbying firms.

In 2019, McCarthy threatened to take action against two members of Congress, Rashida Tlaib and Ilhan Omar, who had sharply criticized the Israeli government's policies in the Palestinian territories and embraced the Boycott, Divestment and Sanctions movement. He said that if Democrats "do not take action I think you'll see action from myself". As Speaker in 2023, McCarthy led the House in voting to remove Omar from her seat on the Foreign Affairs Committee, citing comments she'd made about Israel and concerns over her objectivity. He also passed a resolution condemning antisemitism.

McCarthy voiced support for Hong Kong protesters. He wrote, "the NBA seems more worried about losing business than standing up for freedom."

In January 2020, after the United States assassinated Iranian General Qasem Soleimani, McCarthy criticized Nancy Pelosi for "defending" Soleimani.

McCarthy said he supported Israel's planned annexation of the West Bank. He signed a letter addressed to Israeli Prime Minister Benjamin Netanyahu that reaffirms "the unshakeable alliance between the United States and Israel".

During Trump's presidency, McCarthy praised the administration's plans to leave Afghanistan. When the Biden administration withdrew from Afghanistan, McCarthy assailed Biden for the manner and execution of the withdrawal.

=== Health care ===
As House Majority Leader, McCarthy led efforts to repeal the Patient Protection and Affordable Care Act (ACA or Obamacare). In March 2017, the House Republican repeal legislation, the American Health Care Act, was pulled from the floor minutes before a scheduled vote. After changes made during an internal Republican debate, the bill narrowly passed the House, 217–213, in a May 2017 party-line vote. The House Republican leadership's decision to hold a vote on the legislation before receiving a budget-impact analysis from the nonpartisan Congressional Budget Office was controversial. The CBO subsequently issued a report estimating that the bill would cause 23 million Americans to lose health coverage and would reduce the deficit by $119 billion over 10 years. McCarthy and other House Republican leaders defended the legislation.

=== Immigration ===
Throughout 2018, McCarthy opposed efforts to codify the legal status of DREAMers after Trump suspended Deferred Action for Childhood Arrivals (DACA), which provided temporary stay for undocumented immigrants brought to the U.S. as minors. McCarthy opposed efforts to codify the DACA protection because he thought it would depress turnout among the Republican base in the 2018 elections. According to Politico, it was thought a DACA-type bill could have also undermined McCarthy's chances of becoming House Speaker after Paul Ryan retired from Congress, as it would have made it harder for him to attract the support of hard-line conservatives.

In July 2018, House Democrats called for a floor vote that sought to abolish U.S. Immigration and Customs Enforcement (ICE). House GOP leaders scrapped the latter and called for the House to vote on a resolution authored by McCarthy and Clay Higgins to support ICE. House Speaker Paul Ryan's spokeswoman said Democrats "will now have the chance to stand with the majority of Americans who support ICE and vote for this resolution", or otherwise follow "extreme voices on the far left calling for abolishment of an agency that protects us".

In June 2019, Alexandria Ocasio-Cortez compared the holding centers for undocumented immigrants at the Mexico–United States border to "concentration camps". McCarthy strongly criticized her words, saying they showed disrespect for Holocaust victims.

=== LGBT rights ===
McCarthy was a supporter of the Defense of Marriage Act (DOMA), which barred federal recognition of same-sex marriage and banned same-sex couples from receiving federal spousal benefits; after Obama instructed the Justice Department not to defend the law in court, McCarthy supported House Republicans' legal defense of the law. When the DOMA case reached the Supreme Court in 2013, McCarthy joined Boehner and Eric Cantor in signing a brief urging the Court to uphold the law. In 2022, he voted against the Respect for Marriage Act, which codified key elements of Obergefell v Hodges and formally repealed DOMA.

=== Cannabis ===
McCarthy has a D− rating from National Organization for the Reform of Marijuana Laws for his voting record on cannabis-related matters. He voted against allowing veterans access to medical marijuana, if legal in their state and recommended by their Veterans Health Administration doctor.

=== Other issues ===
In August 2018, McCarthy co-signed a letter spearheaded by John Garamendi, Jared Huffman and Mike Thompson calling on Trump to "send more federal aid to fight" the wildfires in California. The letter in effect requests a "major disaster declaration" across several counties affected by the fires; such a designation would "free up more federal relief" aimed at local governments and individuals affected.

McCarthy introduced the FORWARD Act in 2018, which "would provide $95 million in research funding for valley fever and other fungal diseases". The bill provides $5 million for a "blockchain pilot program", facilitating sharing data between doctors and scientists researching such diseases. It would also fund $8 million in matching grant money to be awarded every year for five years to local groups applying for research grants, as well as $10 million each year for five years to CARB-X, a U.S. Department of Health and Human Services public-private partnership.

On October 23, 2018, McCarthy tweeted that Democratic donors businessman George Soros, businessman Tom Steyer and former New York Mayor Mike Bloomberg were trying to "buy" the upcoming election. He tweeted this a day after a pipe bomb was delivered to Soros's home. Steyer said McCarthy's tweet was a "straight-up antisemitic move" because the three Democrats are Jewish. A vandal threw rocks at McCarthy's office and stole equipment from it, reportedly in reaction to McCarthy's tweet. McCarthy later deleted the tweet but refused to apologize.

In August 2019, McCarthy blamed the 2019 Dayton shooting on video games, saying, "The idea of these video games, they dehumanize individuals to have a game of shooting individuals and others".

Beginning with his time as a Dublin city councillor, Eric Swalwell was targeted by a Chinese woman believed to be a clandestine officer of China's Ministry of State Security. McCarthy called Swalwell, who served on the House Permanent Select Committee on Intelligence, a "national security threat".

=== Claims of social media censorship ===
McCarthy claims that social media platforms like Twitter actively censor conservative politicians and their supporters. He called on former Twitter CEO Jack Dorsey to testify before Congress on the matter. On August 17, 2018, McCarthy submitted a tweet to suggest that conservatives were being censored by showing a screen capture of conservative commentator Laura Ingraham's Twitter account with a sensitive content warning on one of her tweets. This warning was due to McCarthy's own Twitter default settings rather than any censorship from the platform. McCarthy also suggested that Google was biased against Republicans due to short-lived vandalism of the English Wikipedia entry on the California Republican Party being automatically indexed in Google search results.
