= Affordable Insulin Now Act =

Proposed legislation

- Long title: An Act to amend title XXVII of the Public Health Service Act, the Internal Revenue Code of 1986, and the Employee Retirement Income Security Act of 1974 to establish requirements with respect to cost-sharing for certain insulin products, and for other purposes.
- Announced in: the 117th United States Congress
- Number of co-sponsors: 28

Legislative history
- Introduced in the House of Representatives as H.R. 6833 by Angie Craig (D-MN) on February 25, 2022; Committee consideration by House Energy and Commerce; House Ways and Means; House Education and Labor; Passed the House of Representatives on March 31, 2022 (232–193)

The Affordable Insulin Now Act is a bill in the United States Congress intended to cap out-of-pocket insulin prices under private health insurance and Medicare at no more than $35 per month.

The bill was first introduced on February 25, 2022, by Representative Angie Craig (D-MN). On March 31, 2022, the bill passed the House of Representatives, 232–193.

A version of the bill contained in the Inflation Reduction Act (IRA) for private health insurance was blocked by Senate Republicans on August 8, 2022. However, the inflation reduction legislation did cap out-of-pocket insulin cost at $35 per monthly prescription for the following:

- Medicare Part D enrollees, which was legislated at effective on January 1, 2023.
- Medicare Part B enrollees, which was effective starting on July 1, 2023.
