= MCCARTHY Shutdown Act =

Pending United States legislation

- Other short titles: My Constituents Cannot Afford Rebellious Tantrums, Handle Your Shutdown Act
- Long title: A bill to reduce the annual rate of pay of Members of Congress if a Government shutdown occurs during a year, and for other purposes.
- Announced in: the 118th United States Congress

Legislative history
- Introduced in the House of Representatives by Angie Craig (D‑MN) on September 20, 2023

The MCCARTHY Shutdown Act (a backronym of My Constituents Cannot Afford Rebellious Tantrums, Handle Your Shutdown Act) is a proposed United States federal law which (if passed) would prohibit members of Congress from being paid during a government shutdown among other provisions. Introduced by Democratic representative Angie Craig from Minnesota, the bill's title refers to Republican house leader Kevin McCarthy, whose farthest-right Republicans during his tenure as Speaker of the House refused to budge on spending cuts and have advocated for compelling a government shutdown, moves which McCarthy had been unable to control during his speakership.

== Background ==
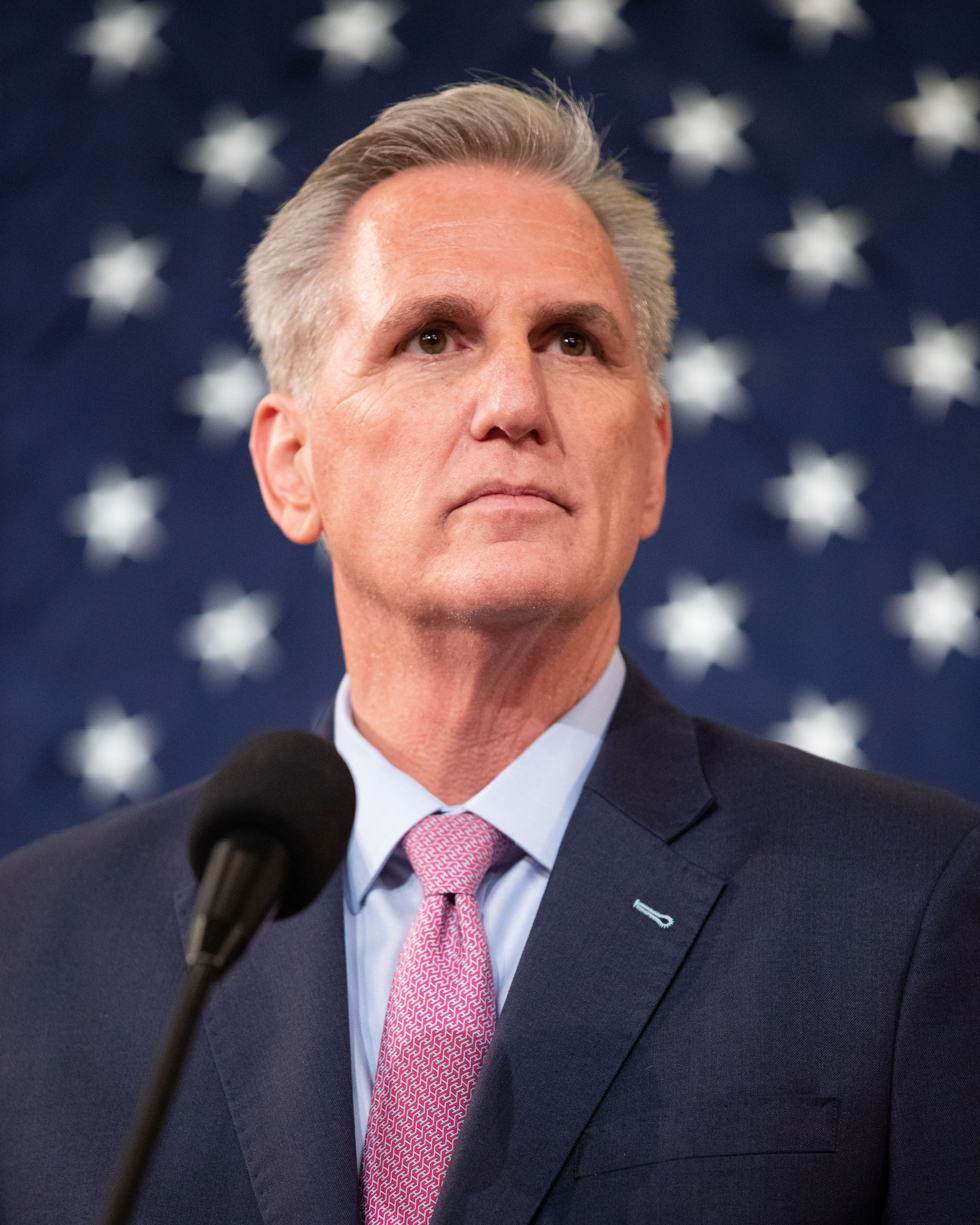
Former House Speaker Kevin McCarthy, whom the bill is named after

Representative Kevin McCarthy's speakership had been widely characterized as him being among the weakest figures to hold the office in recent history, given the very small margin that Republicans in the House of Representatives held after the 2022 midterm elections. The election for his speakership, the first time in nearly a century which a Speaker was not selected after the first round of voting, resulted in McCarthy ceding more control to the Freedom Caucus, which is the farthest-right group of lawmakers in Congress.

In rebellion to certain provisions within a new spending bill, the Fiscal Responsibility Act of 2023, members of the Freedom Caucus and political affiliates of theirs outside the House of Representatives blocked the bill from passing. Members pressured McCarthy to pull out of an agreement he made with President Joe Biden over spending and rein in spending cuts counter to the agreement he made with Biden; the Caucus' members had threatened to hold a vote which would oust McCarthy if he did not comply, which occurred in October.

Craig's legislation also reflected her belief that members of Congress should not be paid during shutdowns, as during the previous 2018-19 federal government shutdown, numerous government workers were not paid for their work that day while members of Congress continued to be paid part of their salaries. In a statement announcing the bill, Craig expressed her belief on how such pay disparities between federal workers and legislators was "ridiculous".

== Provisions ==
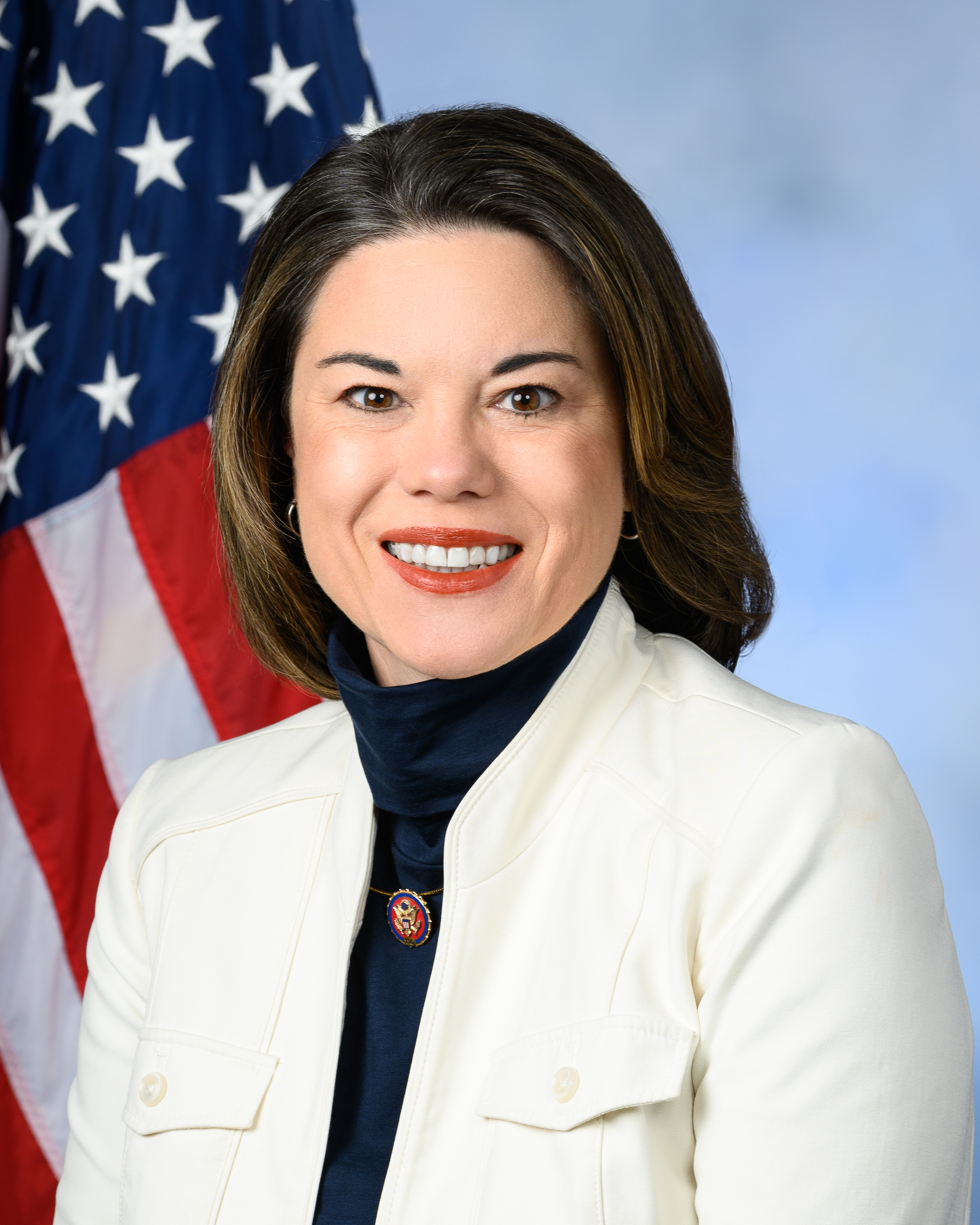
Representative Angie Craig, who introduced the bill

The legislation considers a government shutdown to be any "lapse in appropriations for any Federal agency or department as a result of a failure to enact a regular appropriations bill or continuing resolution." The bill requires that an amount equal to one day's worth of pay is withheld from Congressional salaries, for each day that a spending bill is not passed.

The bill, if passed, would first take effect after the 2024 United States elections and first be effective on the 119th United States Congress, so as to comply with the 27th Amendment to the Constitution.

== Reception ==
The legislation was widely received by American media as a taunt towards the Speaker and the general perception of him being unable to act on issues and spending, to the satisfaction of either party. The New Republic cited that the bill was unlikely to pass or even make it to a floor vote, though noted that it represented a major point of inflection as frustration continued to grow both between and within parties. The Freedom Caucus and its members have expressed their willingness to force a shutdown if there are no major government spending cuts, an idea endorsed by supporters of the Caucus such as President Donald Trump.
