= Kevin McCarthy =

American politician (born 1965)

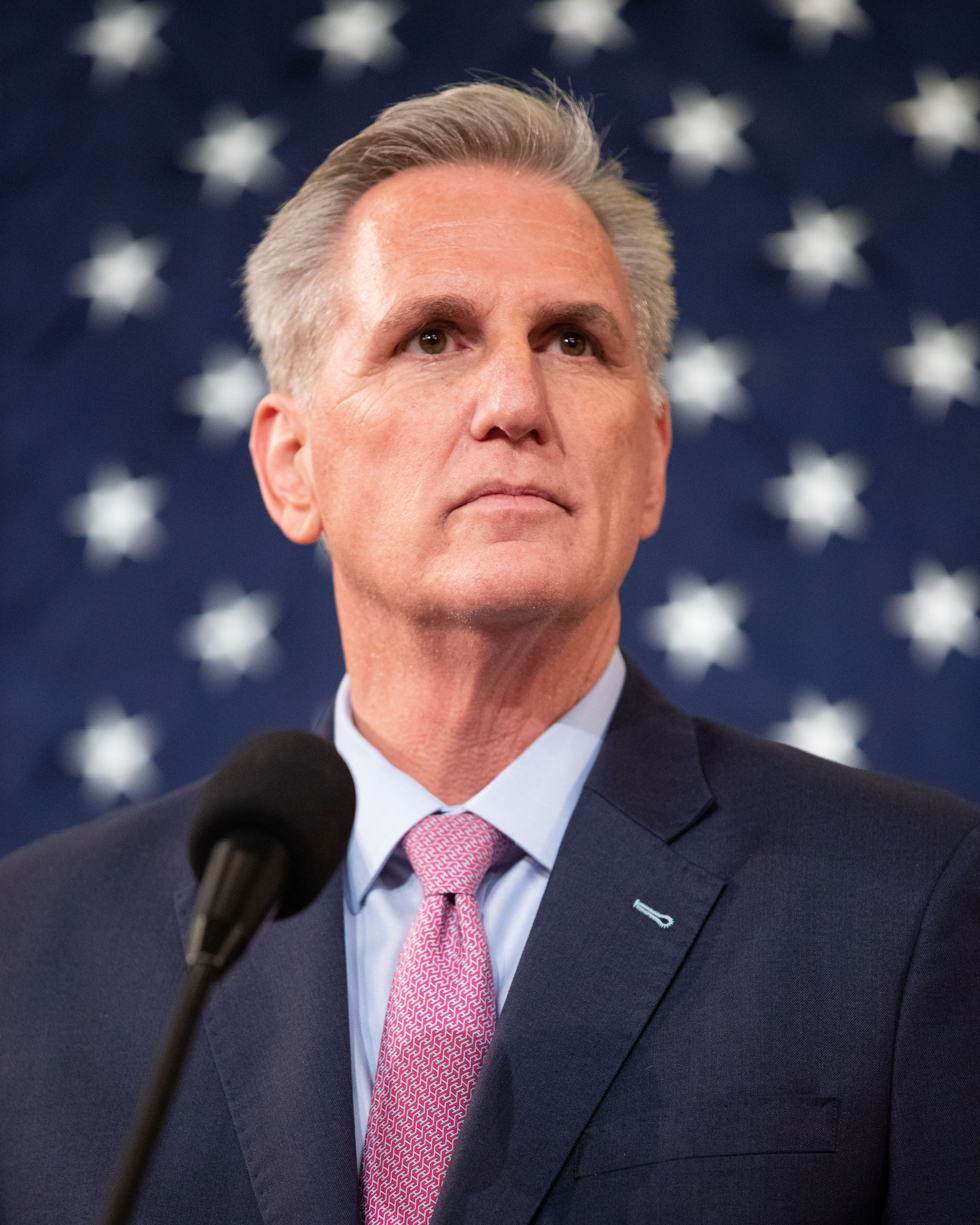
- Official portrait, 2023

55th Speaker of the United States House of Representatives
- In office January 7, 2023 – October 3, 2023
- Preceded by: Nancy Pelosi (Note: A multi-ballot election lasted for 4 days, with McCarthy assuming office on January 7. House Clerk Cheryl Johnson served as the acting presiding officer pursuant to the previous rules of the House.)
- Succeeded by: Mike Johnson (Note: Following McCarthy's removal as speaker on October 3, 2023, Patrick McHenry acted as speaker pro tempore until Johnson's election as speaker on October 25, 2023.)
House positions
House Minority Leader
In office January 3, 2019 – January 3, 2023
Whip	Steve Scalise
Preceded by	Nancy Pelosi
Succeeded by	Hakeem Jeffries
Leader of the House Republican Conference
In office January 3, 2019 – October 3, 2023
Deputy	Steve Scalise
Preceded by	Paul Ryan
Succeeded by	Mike Johnson
House Majority Leader
In office August 1, 2014 – January 3, 2019
Speaker	John Boehner; Paul Ryan
Preceded by	Eric Cantor
Succeeded by	Steny Hoyer
House Majority Whip
In office January 3, 2011 – August 1, 2014
Speaker	John Boehner
Preceded by	Jim Clyburn
Succeeded by	Steve Scalise
House Republican Chief Deputy Whip
In office January 3, 2009 – January 3, 2011
Leader	John Boehner
Preceded by	Eric Cantor
Succeeded by	Peter Roskam

Member of the U.S. House of Representatives from California
- In office January 3, 2007 – December 31, 2023
- Preceded by: Bill Thomas
- Succeeded by: Vince Fong
- Constituency: 22nd district (2007–2013); 23rd district (2013–2023); 20th district (2023)

Minority Leader of the California Assembly
- In office January 5, 2004 – April 17, 2006
- Preceded by: Dave Cox
- Succeeded by: George Plescia

Member of the California State Assembly from the 32nd district
- In office December 2, 2002 – November 30, 2006
- Preceded by: Roy Ashburn
- Succeeded by: Jean Fuller

Personal details
- Born: Kevin Owen McCarthy; January 26, 1965 (age 61) Bakersfield, California, U.S.
- Party: Republican
- Spouse: Judy Wages (m. 1992)
- Children: 2
- Education: California State University, Bakersfield (BS, MBA)
- McCarthy's voice McCarthy on the establishment of the House Committee on the CCP; Recorded January 10, 2023

Kevin Owen McCarthy (born January 26, 1965) is an American politician who served as the 55th speaker of the United States House of Representatives from January to October 2023. A member of the Republican Party, he represented California's 22nd congressional district from 2007 to 2013, followed by California's 23rd congressional district from 2013 to 2023, and finally California's 20th congressional district in 2023 before resigning from the House of Representatives the same year.

Born and raised in Bakersfield, California, McCarthy graduated from the Bakersfield campus of California State University. He served two terms as a member of the California State Assembly before being elected to the U.S. House in 2006. McCarthy served as the House Republican chief deputy whip from 2009 to 2011 and as House majority whip from 2011 to 2014. After House majority leader Eric Cantor's reelection loss in the 2014 Republican primary, McCarthy was elected majority leader under Speaker John Boehner, a position he retained during Paul Ryan's speakership. In 2019, after Ryan retired, McCarthy was elected House Minority Leader.

As Minority Leader, McCarthy supported Donald Trump's false claims of election fraud after Joe Biden won the 2020 U.S. presidential election and initially participated in efforts to overturn the results. After the U.S. Capitol was stormed during the 2021 electoral vote count, McCarthy reversed his previous comments on voter fraud in the election and blamed Trump for the riot. By 2022, he had publicly reconciled with Trump. McCarthy led the House Republicans through the 2022 elections, in which they gained a slimmer-than-expected majority.

McCarthy was the Republican nominee for speaker in January 2023 but did not win the speakership on the first attempt, securing the office only after days of successive votes on a historic 15 different ballots as well as negotiations within his own party. During his tenure as speaker, very few bills were passed into law compared to preceding modern congresses.

As speaker, McCarthy dealt with a standoff between the House Republican conference and Biden administration that led to the 2023 debt-ceiling crisis that nearly culminated in a first-ever national default. To resolve the crisis, the parties negotiated the Fiscal Responsibility Act of 2023, which passed with bipartisan support in Congress before Biden signed it into law. In September 2023, McCarthy relied on Democrats to help pass a bipartisan continuing resolution to avert a government shutdown. As a result, Republican congressman Matt Gaetz filed a motion to vacate the speakership against McCarthy.

Following a largely unprecedented House floor debate between members of the majority party, McCarthy was voted out as speaker on October 3, 2023. He was succeeded by Mike Johnson as speaker. His tenure was the third-shortest for a speaker of the House in United States history, (Note: Theodore M. Pomeroy (one day) and Michael C. Kerr (258 days) served shorter terms than McCarthy.) and he became the first speaker to ever be removed from the role during a legislative session. McCarthy resigned as a member of the House at the end of 2023.

== Early life and education ==
McCarthy's 1983 high school yearbook photo

McCarthy was born on January 26, 1965, in Bakersfield, California. He is the son of Owen McCarthy an assistant city fire chief, and Roberta Darlene (née Palladino), a homemaker. McCarthy is a fourth-generation resident of Kern County. His maternal grandfather was an Italian immigrant. McCarthy is the first Republican in his immediate family, as his parents were members of the Democratic Party. He attended Bakersfield High School, where he played on the football team, from 1979 to 1983.

In 1984, at age 19, McCarthy ran his first business selling sandwiches out of the back of his uncle's yogurt shop on Stine Road. He was able to finance this business after winning $5,000 in the California State Lottery and subsequently investing these winnings in the stock market.

McCarthy attended California State University, Bakersfield, where he obtained a Bachelor of Science in marketing in 1989 and a Master of Business Administration in 1994. During college, he worked as a seasonal firefighter for the Kern County Fire Department.

== Early political career ==
McCarthy served on the staff of Congressman Bill Thomas from 1987 to 2002. He chaired the California Young Republicans in 1995 and the Young Republican National Federation from 1999 to 2001. From the late 1990s until 2000, he was Thomas's district director. McCarthy won his first election in 2000, as a Kern Community College District trustee. However, Thomas has since criticized McCarthy in numerous interviews.

McCarthy was elected to the California State Assembly in 2002 and became the Republican floor leader in 2003. In 2006, McCarthy was first elected to the United States House of Representatives as a representative for California's 22nd district. He succeeded his former boss, Bill Thomas, who retired. The district was renumbered as the 23rd district in 2013, and again as the 20th district in 2023.

== U.S. House of Representatives ==
=== Committee assignments ===
- Committee on Financial Services
  - Subcommittee on Capital Markets, Insurance, and Government-Sponsored Enterprises
  - Subcommittee on Financial Institutions and Consumer Credit

Caucus memberships

- Congressional Western Caucus

=== Party leadership ===
- House Republican steering committee
- House Republican Chief Deputy Whip, 2009–2011
- House Majority Whip, 2011–2014
- House Majority Leader, 2014–2019
- House Minority Leader, 2019–2023
- Speaker of the House, January to October 2023

=== Early leadership posts ===
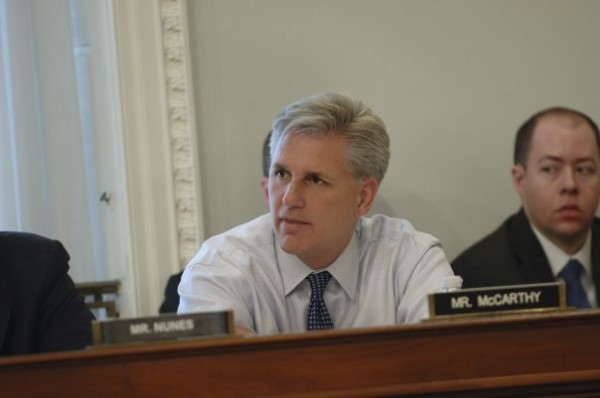
McCarthy at a 2008 oversight hearing of the House Natural Resources Subcommittee on Water and Power

As a freshman congressman, McCarthy was appointed to the Republican Steering committee. Republican leader John Boehner appointed him chair of the Republican platform committee during the committee's meetings in Minneapolis in August 2008, which produced the Republican Party Platform for 2008. He was also one of the three founding members of the GOP Young Guns Program. After the 2008 elections, he was chosen as chief deputy minority whip, the highest-ranking appointed position in the House Republican Conference. His predecessor, Eric Cantor, was named minority whip. McCarthy helped recruit candidates associated with the Tea Party movement in the 2010 U.S. House elections.

=== House majority whip ===
On November 17, 2010, the House Republican Conference selected McCarthy to be the House majority whip in the 112th Congress. In this post, he was the third-ranking House Republican, behind Speaker John Boehner and majority leader Eric Cantor.

In August 2011, McCarthy and Cantor led a group of 30 Republican members of Congress to Israel, where some members took part in a late-night swim in the Sea of Galilee, including one member—Kevin Yoder—who swam nude. When McCarthy and Cantor later found out about the swim, they were "furious" and worried about negative news coverage, and "called a members-only meeting the next morning to reprimand the group—both those who swam and those who abstained".

In 2012, McCarthy's office reported spending $99,000 on pastries, bottled water, and other food items, making him the highest-spending member of the House in this category.

=== House majority leader ===
Cantor lost the June 2014 primary for his seat in Congress and announced he would step down from House leadership at the end of July. McCarthy sought to succeed Cantor, and, after some speculation that Pete Sessions and Jeb Hensarling would challenge him, both dropped out, leaving McCarthy a clear path to become majority leader. On June 13, representative Raul Labrador announced he would also seek the leadership position. On June 19, the Republican Conference elected McCarthy majority leader.

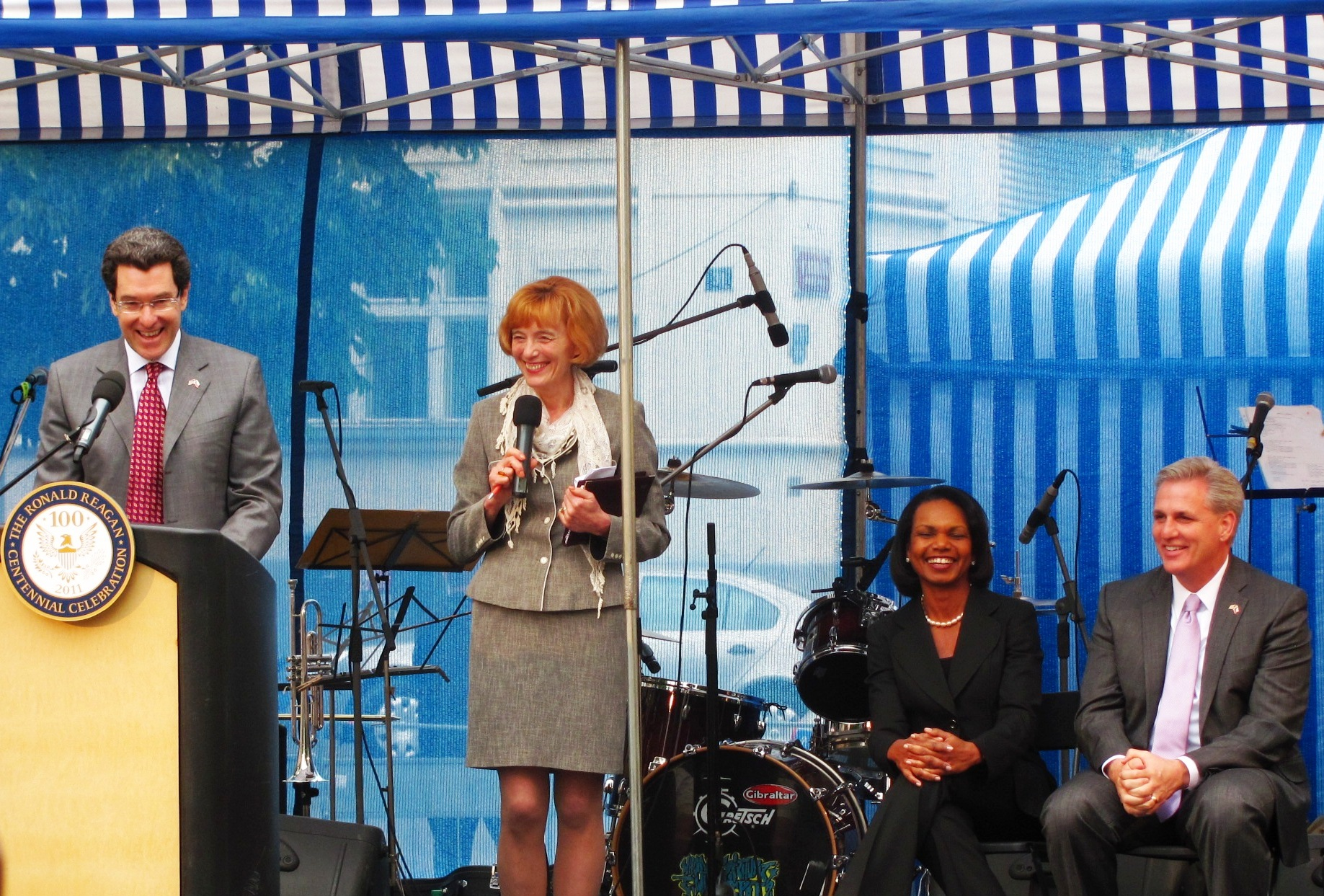
Norman L. Eisen, Condoleezza Rice and McCarthy in Prague, Czech Republic, 2011

According to the University of Minnesota's Humphrey School of Public Affairs, McCarthy is the least-tenured majority leader in the history of the House of Representatives. When he assumed the position in July 2014, he had served only seven years, six months and 29 days, the least experience of any floor leader in the House's history by more than a year.

McCarthy kept four of his predecessor's staff members on his staff when he took over as majority leader, including deputy chief of staff Neil Bradley, who now has served in that role for three majority leaders.

McCarthy has been under fire for avoiding meetings and town-hall events with constituents in his congressional district for years. His last town hall was in June 2010. He has opted for screened telephone calls since.

In December 2017, McCarthy voted for the House Republican tax legislation. After the vote, he asked his constituents to "Come February, check your check, because that will be the pay raise of the vote for Donald Trump."

An October 2018 investigation documented how William "Bill" Wages, of McCarthy's brother-in-law's company Vortex Construction, has received $7.6 million since 2000 in no-bid and other prime federal contracts as a minority business (a claim that has been disputed). The work was mostly for construction projects at the Naval Air Weapons Station China Lake in McCarthy's Bakersfield-based district, and Naval Air Station Lemoore in California's Kings County.

=== Unsuccessful 2015 candidacy for speaker of the House ===
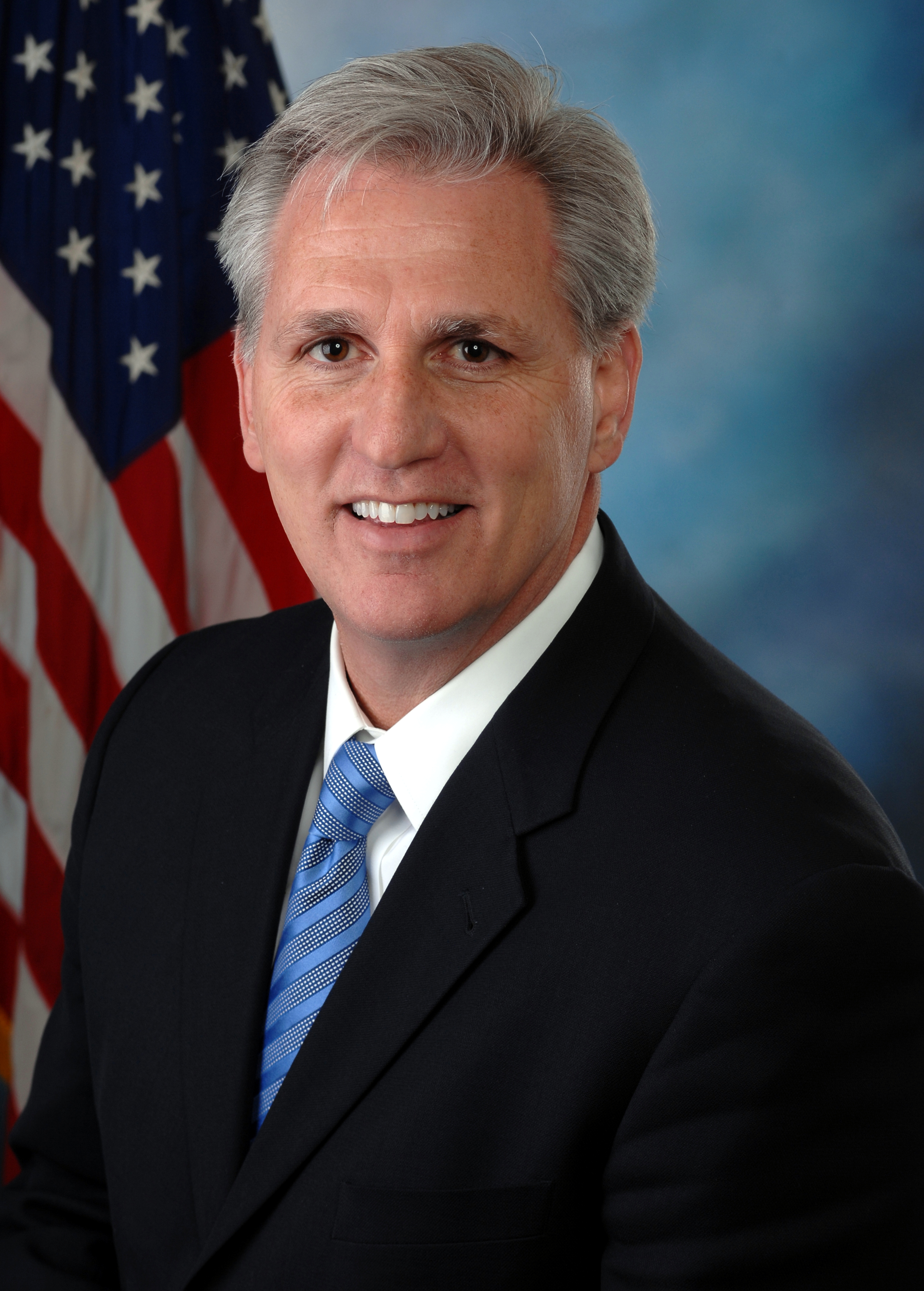
Official portrait, 2016

On September 25, 2015, John Boehner decided to resign as speaker effective October 30, 2015. Many media outlets speculated that McCarthy would likely replace him, and Boehner himself said that McCarthy "would make an excellent speaker". On September 28, McCarthy formally announced his candidacy. Having held congressional office for less than nine years, McCarthy would have been the speaker with the least time in Congress since 1891.

In a September 29, 2015, interview with Fox News's Sean Hannity, McCarthy was asked what Republicans had accomplished in Congress. He replied by talking about the House of Representatives' special panel investigation into the 2012 Benghazi attack (in which Islamic militants attacked the American diplomatic compound in Benghazi, Libya). Republicans said the purpose of the government-funded committee was purely to investigate the deaths of four Americans. But McCarthy said, "Everybody thought Hillary Clinton was unbeatable, right? But we put together a Benghazi special committee, a select committee. What are her numbers today? Her numbers are dropping. Why? Because she's untrustable. But no one would have known any of that had happened had we not fought." The comment was seen as an admission that the investigation was a partisan political undertaking rather than a substantive inquiry. Some commentators described his remark as a classic "Kinsley gaffe" (defined as when a politician accidentally tells the truth). The remark was also described as "saying the quiet part loud". Several days later, McCarthy apologized for the remarks and said the Benghazi panel was not a political initiative.

On October 8, 2015, as Republicans were preparing to vote, McCarthy unexpectedly dropped out of the race, saying that Republicans needed a fresh face who could unite the caucus and "I am not that guy." He reportedly dropped out after concluding that he did not have the 218 votes that would be required to be elected speaker. McCarthy remained majority leader. The Benghazi gaffe contributed to his decision to withdraw from the race, as McCarthy acknowledged in announcing his withdrawal. Previously, Representative Walter B. Jones Jr. had sent a letter to the Republican Conference Chairwoman Cathy McMorris Rodgers stating that any candidates for a leadership position with "misdeeds" should withdraw from the race. Jones has said that his comment did not specifically refer to McCarthy.

Paul Ryan instead won the 2015 election and became speaker from 2015 to 2019.

=== House minority leader ===
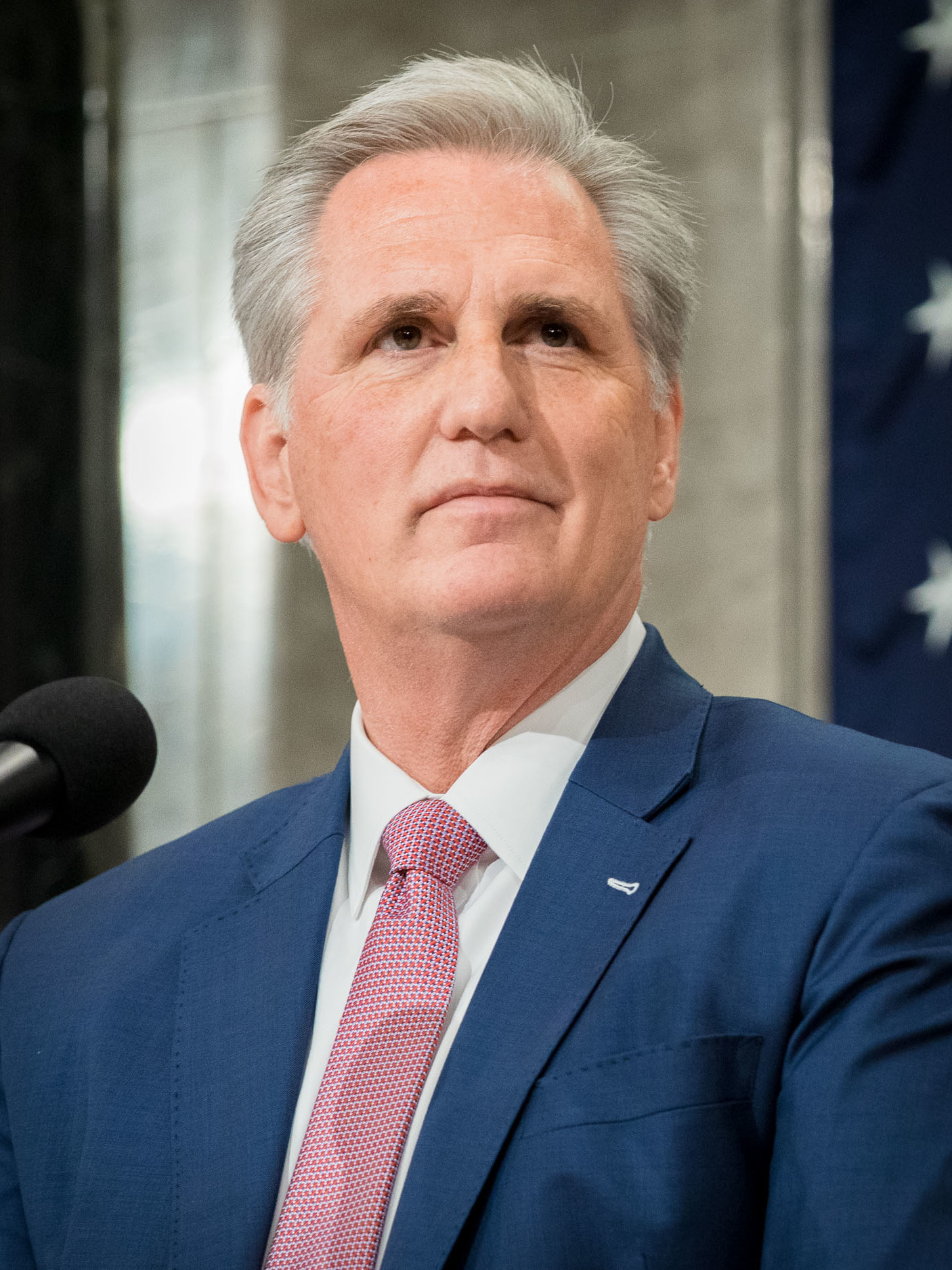
McCarthy as house minority leader, 2019

After the Republicans lost their majority in the 2018 elections, McCarthy was elected Minority Leader, fending off a challenge to his right from Jim Jordan of Ohio, 159–43. While as majority leader he had been the second-ranking House Republican behind Ryan, as minority leader he was now the leader of the House Republicans.

McCarthy had been a strong supporter of Donald Trump since 2016. As minority leader, he remained a close Trump ally, keeping the Republican caucus unified in support of Trump and against his impeachment on two articles of impeachment arising from the Trump–Ukraine scandal. McCarthy associated with key figures in Trump's effort to enlist the Ukrainian government in discrediting Joe Biden, Trump's political opponent; such figures included Lev Parnas, Rudy Giuliani, and Robert F. Hyde.

McCarthy speaks at a Trump rally

Like Trump, McCarthy supported Marjorie Taylor Greene, a Republican candidate in 2020 for a U.S. House seat from northwest Georgia; Greene's past racist, anti-Semitic comments and her promotion of QAnon (a far-right conspiracy theory) led other Republicans to distance themselves from her. McCarthy did not take steps to thwart Greene's candidacy and did not endorse her opponent in the Republican primary runoff election. After Greene was nominated, McCarthy denounced the fringe conspiracy, saying, "There is no place for QAnon in the Republican Party", and said that Greene had distanced herself from her earlier statements. In 2020, McCarthy was asked about Trump's false claims that Joe Scarborough (an MSNBC host and former Republican congressman) was linked to the death of a staff member; a few House Republicans criticized Trump for making inflammatory and false statements, but McCarthy declined to take a position. McCarthy's predecessor, Bill Thomas, for whom McCarthy served as a staffer from 1987 through 2002, excoriated McCarthy for his failure to accept the result of the 2020 presidential election and unwillingness to fully confront Trump for his role in precipitating and maintaining the January 6, 2021, attack on the Capitol.

In May 2020, during the COVID-19 pandemic, McCarthy and House Republicans filed a lawsuit to stop the House of Representatives from allowing remote proxy voting by representatives, a measure that had been introduced under Speaker Nancy Pelosi to prevent the virus's spread in the Capitol. McCarthy and the other plaintiffs claimed that a quorum of members had to be physically present in the chamber to conduct business; Pelosi defended the rule as a critical public health measure and pointed to the Constitution authorizing each chamber of Congress to establish its own procedural rules. In August 2020, a federal judge dismissed McCarthy's lawsuit against Pelosi, ruling that the House has "absolute immunity from civil suit" under the Constitution's Speech or Debate Clause.

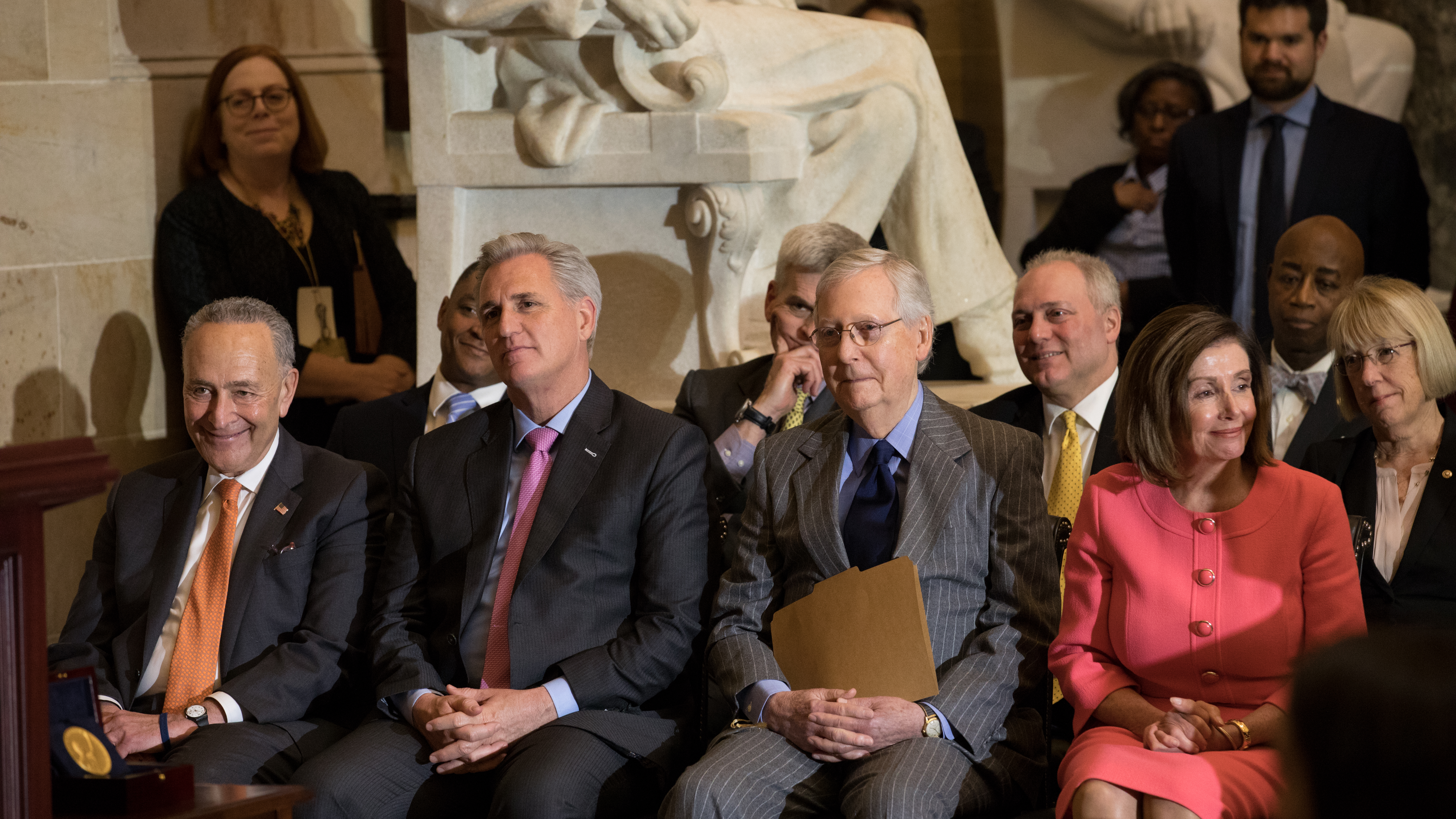
McCarthy with other congressional leaders in January 2020

In November 2020, in the aftermath of the 2020 presidential election, McCarthy insisted on Laura Ingraham's television show that "President Trump won this election"—echoing Trump's own claim—even as vote-counting was ongoing in several states and no winner had yet been declared. McCarthy insinuated that large-scale voter fraud would lead Trump to lose, saying "Everyone who is listening: Do not be quiet. Do not be silent about this. We cannot allow this to happen before our very eyes."

In December 2020, McCarthy was one of 126 Republican members of the House of Representatives to sign an amicus brief in support of Texas v. Pennsylvania, a lawsuit filed at the United States Supreme Court contesting the results of the 2020 presidential election. House Speaker Nancy Pelosi issued a statement that called signing the amicus brief an act of "election subversion". The Supreme Court declined to hear the case, on the basis that Texas lacked standing under Article III of the Constitution to challenge the results of an election held by another state. In March 2021, McCarthy denied he had supported Trump's false claims of election fraud, despite having supported Texas v. Pennsylvania.

On January 6, 2021, hours after the attack on the Capitol, McCarthy voted against certifying Biden's win in two states. Cook Political Report House editor Dave Wasserman later reported that McCarthy had told him on several occasions before this vote that he knew Biden had won. He later denied that this was a vote to overturn the election, because Biden would still have won without those two states. McCarthy finally recognized Biden as president-elect on January 8, more than two months after the election.

During a January 8 conference call with other House Republican leaders, McCarthy said that Trump's conduct during the Capitol riot was "atrocious and totally wrong" and that he was "inciting people" to attack the Capitol, and briefly inquired about invoking the 25th Amendment to remove him from office. On a January 10 conference call with Republican leaders, McCarthy said he would ask Trump to resign rather than go through a long impeachment battle, adding, "I've had it with this guy." During the same call he also expressed a wish that tech companies such as Facebook and Twitter would strip some Republican lawmakers of their social media accounts. But after weak House Republican support for Trump's second impeachment, fearing retribution from Trump and his allies, McCarthy backed off from this stance.

A week after the attack, McCarthy delivered a speech in which he held Trump partially responsible for the riots. He emphasized that Trump failed to intervene after the initial TV footage, showing the demonstration evolving into a violent assault. He later said that he did not believe Trump had provoked the mob. On January 28, McCarthy paid Trump a visit at his Mar-a-Lago residence. Officially the topic was said to be "regaining the lost votes in the midterm elections of 2022", but it was widely reported as an attempt to mend fences with Trump and lessen tensions in the Republican Party.

During the second impeachment trial of Donald Trump, Congresswoman Jaime Herrera Beutler said that Trump said to McCarthy during the ongoing attack on the Capitol by rioters: "Well, Kevin, I guess these people are more upset about the election than you are." She was not called as a witness but her statement was included in the impeachment documents.

In April 2021, before closing arguments in the Derek Chauvin trial, Maxine Waters said, "I hope we're going to get a verdict that will say guilty, guilty, guilty. And if we don't, we cannot go away" and need to get "more confrontational". After her comments, McCarthy said, "Waters is inciting violence in Minneapolis just as she has incited it in the past. If Speaker Pelosi doesn't act against this dangerous rhetoric, I will bring action this week."

Because of her stance on the Capitol riot, her vote to impeach Trump and vocal opposition to his stolen election narrative, in early 2021 pro-Trump Freedom Caucus House members attempted to remove Liz Cheney as chair of the House Republican Conference, the third-ranking position in the Republican House leadership. The initial effort failed, but growing numbers of House Republicans supported her removal; McCarthy agreed to a party vote in May, resulting in Cheney's ouster. Hours after the vote, McCarthy said, "I don't think anybody is questioning the legitimacy of the presidential election", but a CNN poll released days earlier found that 70% of Republicans believed the election was stolen. In October 2021, McCarthy pressured Republican political consultants not to work with Cheney or else lose business with other Republicans.

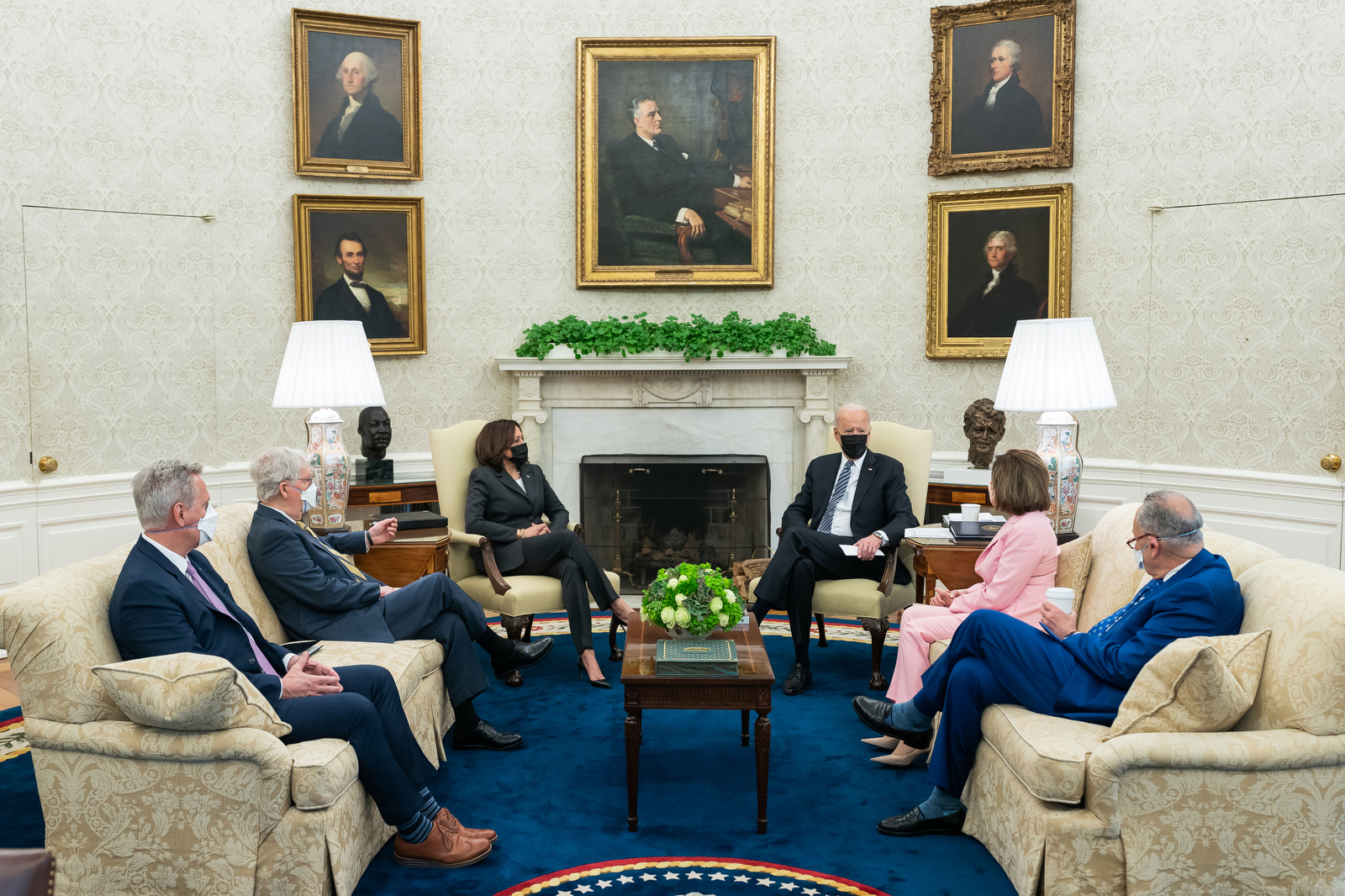
McCarthy, Mitch McConnell, Chuck Schumer, and Nancy Pelosi meet with President Joe Biden and Vice President Kamala Harris in May 2021.

On May 18, 2021, McCarthy announced that he opposed the bipartisan agreement in the House to form an independent commission to investigate the Capitol attack. McCarthy had asked Representative John Katko, a member of his whip team, to negotiate with Democrats on the caucus's behalf about the commission. McCarthy specified to Katko what he and Senate Minority Leader Mitch McConnell wanted, and got almost everything he asked for. McCarthy also said that the scope of any investigation should include other events of political violence, which was possible with the terms negotiated. McCarthy sided with other Republicans who sought to downplay the matter and move on. In June 2021, after Pelosi announced the creation of a select committee to investigate the Capitol attack that would include five Republican members, McCarthy threatened to remove Republicans from committee assignments if they participated.

In July 2021, the delta variant of the coronavirus prompted the Attending Physician of the United States Congress to reimpose a mask requirement in the House chamber. McCarthy called this "a decision conjured up by liberal government officials who want to continue to live in a perpetual pandemic state", prompting Pelosi to respond to reporters, "he's such a moron." On July 31, 2021, members of Tennessee's Republican congressional delegation gave McCarthy a large gavel with the words "Fire Pelosi" inscribed on it. McCarthy told them, "it will be hard not to hit her with it, but I will bang it down."

In August 2021, after the House Select Committee on the January 6 Attack asked telecommunications and social media companies to retain certain records, McCarthy said that if the companies "turn over private information" to the committee, they would be "in violation of federal law and subject to losing their ability to operate in the United States", and that a future Republican legislative majority would hold them "fully accountable". McCarthy did not specify which law the companies would break in this situation.

On November 18, 2021, and into the early morning of November 19, McCarthy gave a record-breaking 8.5-hour speech on the House floor using the "magic minute", forcing a delay in the final vote on the Build Back Better Act. This record was later broken by Hakeem Jeffries on July 3, 2025.

On May 12, 2022, the January 6 Committee subpoenaed McCarthy and Republican representatives Jim Jordan, Mo Brooks, Scott Perry and Andy Biggs. In December, the committee referred McCarthy, Jordan, Perry and Biggs to the House Ethics Committee for disobeying the subpoenas.

== Speaker of the House ==
=== Nomination and election ===
McCarthy delivering speech after becoming speaker

As minority leader, McCarthy led Republicans in the 2022 election cycle. Many party officials and political pundits predicted Republicans would make large gains in the House. In the elections, Republicans gained a majority, continuing the decades-long trend of the incumbent president's party losing a House majority in their midterm elections. This also marked the first time since the 115th Congress that Republicans held a majority. But Republicans did not fulfill widespread predictions of large gains, as their majority was narrow. McCarthy won an internal Republican conference vote in early November, with 188 votes to Andy Biggs's 31, but some members of the conference continued to oppose his bid for speaker.

At the start of the 118th Congress on January 3, 2023, McCarthy failed to secure a majority of votes cast on the first ballot, with all Democrats and 19 Republicans opposing him. This marked the first time since the December 1923 speaker election that the first ballot did not produce a speaker. McCarthy finally received a majority and became speaker on the 15th ballot on January 7, after making key concessions to some members of the right-wing Freedom Caucus, including a rule to allow a single House member to introduce a vote to remove the speaker, as well as granting Freedom Caucus members three seats on the influential Rules Committee. Additionally, it was the longest multi-ballot speaker election since 1859.

=== Tenure ===
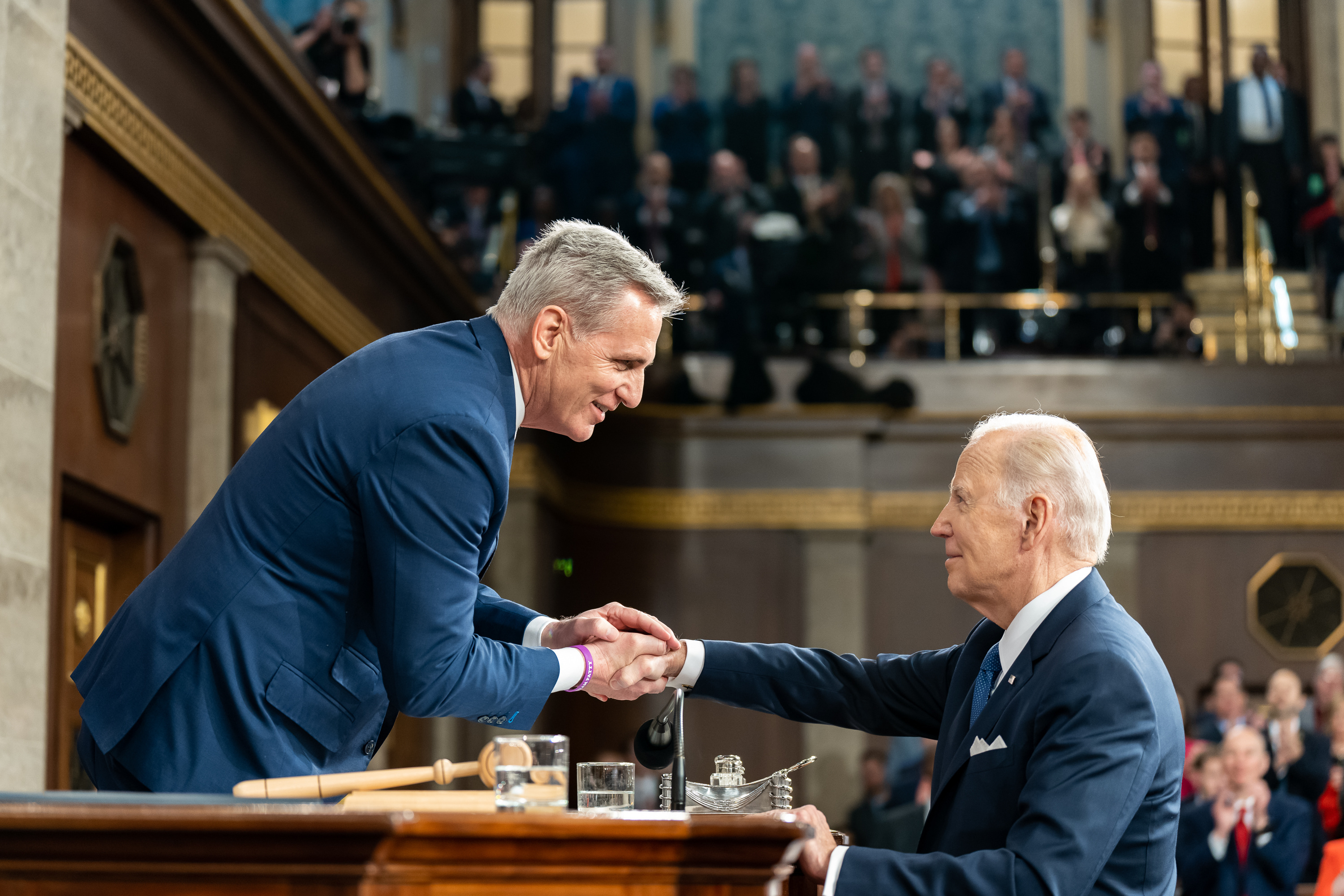
Speaker McCarthy greets U.S. President Joe Biden before the 2023 State of the Union Address.

During McCarthy's tenure as speaker, the U.S. Congress was extremely unproductive compared to preceding modern congresses. Very few bills were passed into law, for which analysts in large part faulted discord among the House's Republicans.

In February 2023, McCarthy released over 40,000 hours of security video of the January 6 Capitol attack to Fox News host Tucker Carlson, prompting criticism from colleagues such as House Minority Leader Hakeem Jeffries and Senate Majority Leader Chuck Schumer. Days later, Carlson aired several minutes of the video during his program and asserted that government investigators had exaggerated the degree of criminality during the attack. Justice Department prosecutors said that in one case Carlson's video clips were misleadingly edited to suggest that one prominent Capitol intruder had been unjustly prosecuted, omitting video of him engaged in criminal activity.

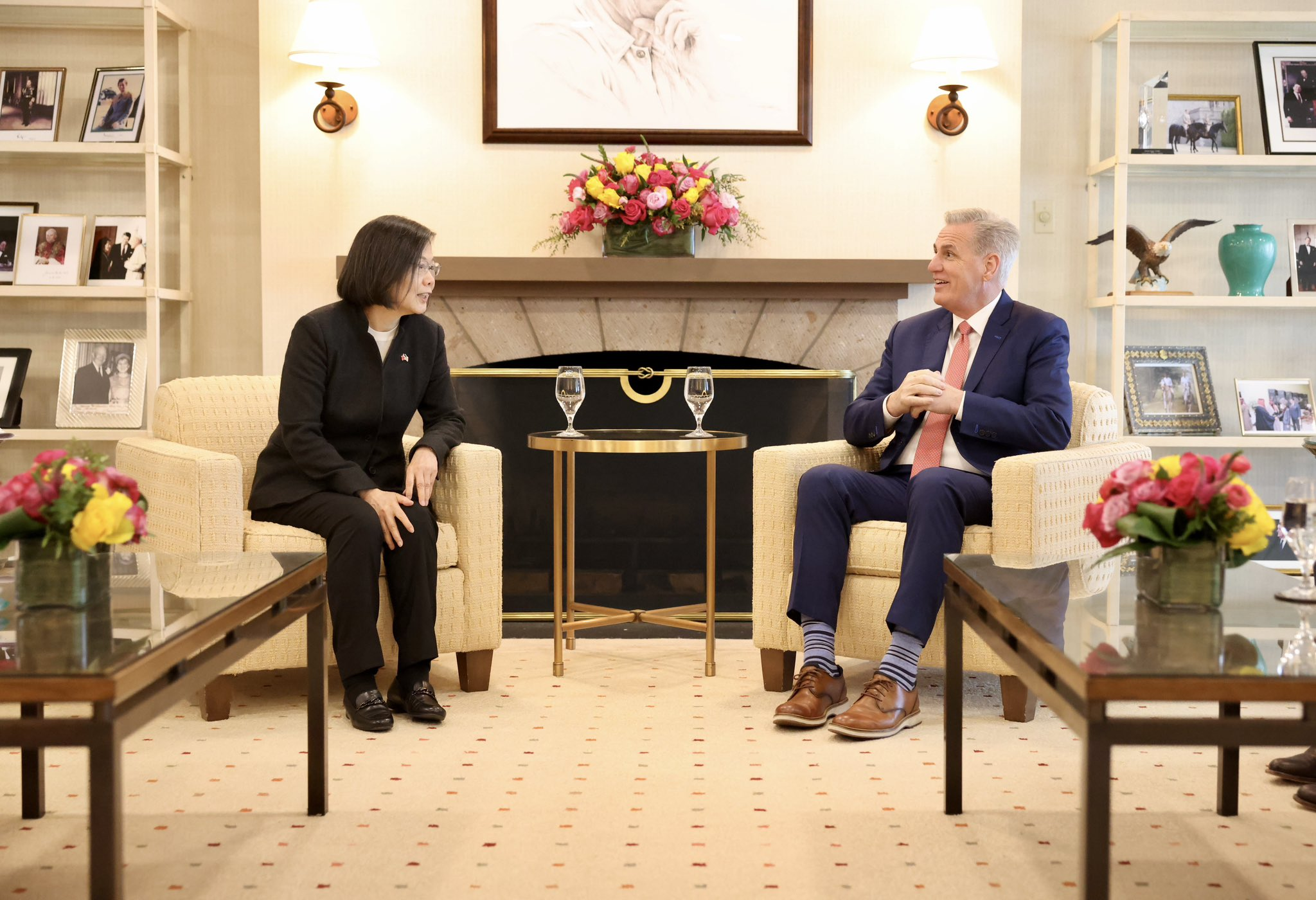
Speaker McCarthy meets with president of Taiwan Tsai Ing-wen, April 5, 2023.

In March 2023, McCarthy announced he had planned a meeting with the Taiwanese President Tsai Ing-wen, in the U.S. He initially declined an invitation from Ukrainian President Volodymyr Zelenskyy to visit Ukraine, saying he opposed giving "blank checks" to Ukraine and did not need to visit Ukraine to know whether the money was necessary. The planned meeting with Tsai was condemned by the Chinese Communist Party, which threatened to take strong action. McCarthy and Tsai met on April 5 at the Ronald Reagan Presidential Library, where he denounced China's threats. The meeting, which was described as a historic first, triggered a series of Chinese military exercises near Taiwan, which the People's Liberation Army described as three-day "combat readiness patrols", meant to warn to the Taiwanese. On April 8, approximately eight Chinese warships and 42 fighter jets were detected near Taiwan's coasts.

In April 2023, McCarthy, Senate majority leader Chuck Schumer, and Senate minority leader Mitch McConnell invited South Korean President Yoon Suk Yeol to address a joint meeting of Congress, scheduled for April 27.

In May 2023, amid a debt-ceiling crisis, McCarthy worked closely with President Biden to resolve the issue. Members of the Freedom Caucus attempted to persuade McCarthy to make more robust demands in exchange for raising the debt ceiling, but with days until a potentially disastrous default, McCarthy did not do so. He negotiated the Fiscal Responsibility Act of 2023 that was introduced by Republican representative Patrick McHenry, and it passed the House on May 31 and the Senate on June 1. Biden signed it into law on June 3, ending the crisis and preventing a default.

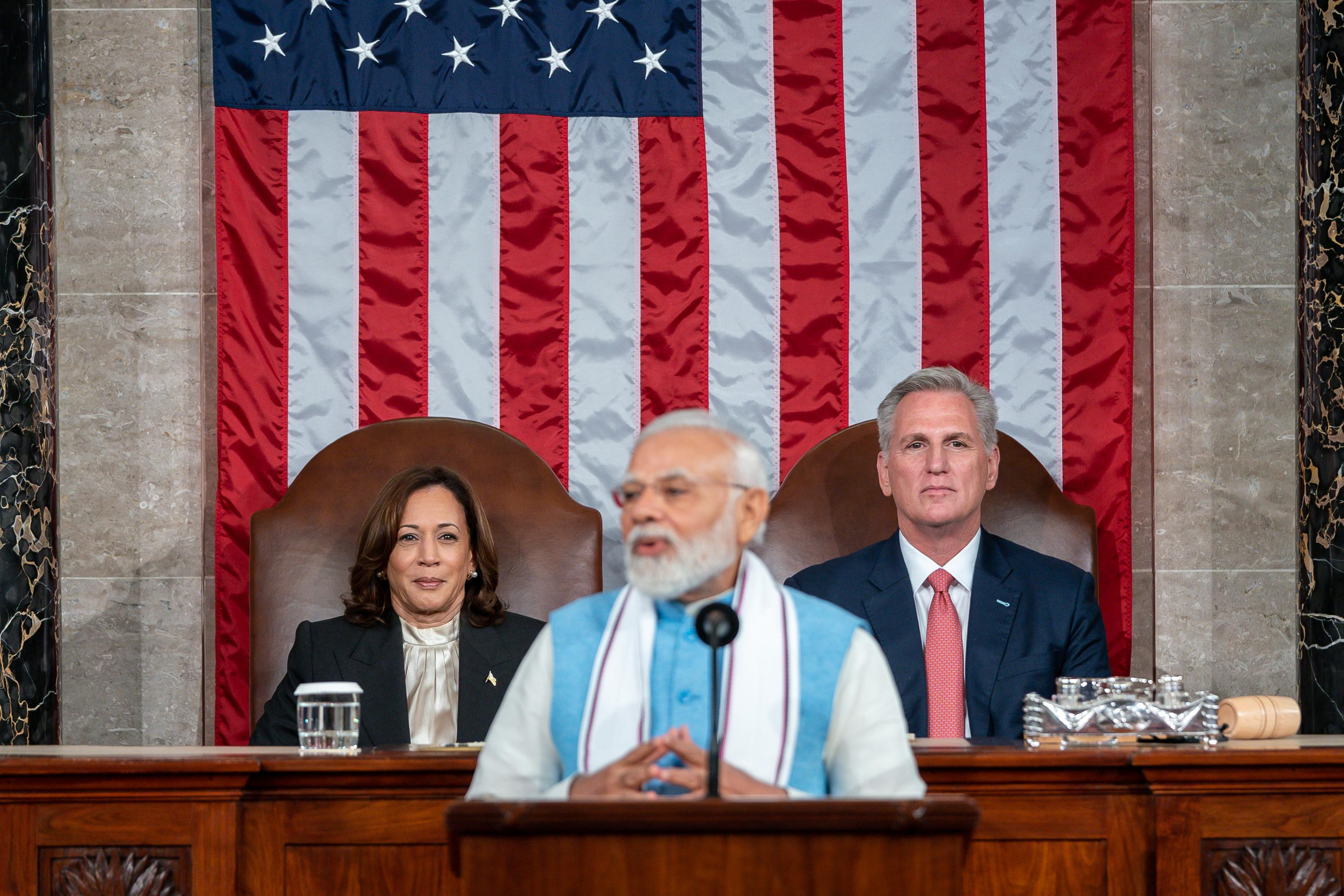
McCarthy and Vice President Kamala Harris behind Indian Prime Minister Narendra Modi as he addresses Congress, June 22, 2023

McCarthy had urged Biden to withdraw the nomination of Julie Su as United States secretary of labor, arguing her controversial record would lead to "potential disastrous ramifications at the federal level".

McCarthy has expressed support for a proposal to "expunge" both of President Trump's impeachments.

Amplifying allegations of corruption by President Joe Biden, a number of Republicans called for his impeachment. On September 1, 2023, McCarthy said that he would not initiate an impeachment inquiry without a full House vote, though it appeared he did not have sufficient Republican support to pass such a measure. On September 12, he announced that he was directing the Oversight, Judiciary, and Ways and Means committees to begin an impeachment inquiry, to be led by James Comer, chairman of the Oversight Committee. He did not say whether a full House vote might be held. McCarthy asserted that, over his objections, former Speaker Nancy Pelosi had changed the process when Democrats pursued the first impeachment of Donald Trump in 2019, so that he was following what she had done. In 2019, Democrats conducted a five-week investigation before holding a full House vote to approve an impeachment inquiry.

The impeachment allegations coincided with rising fears of a federal government shutdown, as McCarthy's concessions to Biden infuriated members of the Freedom Caucus who were calling for less spending. The Freedom Caucus's cause was echoed by various politicians outside the House, notably including Trump and Florida Governor Ron DeSantis. Amid the Republican infighting and in a push to halt legislators' pay during shutdowns, Representative Angie Craig introduced the MCCARTHY (My Constituents Cannot Afford Rebellious Tantrums, Handle Your) Shutdown Act.

=== Removal ===
McCarthy giving a press conference following his removal

On September 29, 2023, McCarthy's bill to fund the federal government, including large spending cuts and strict border policies, failed to pass the House after 21 hard-right House Republicans joined all Democrats present in voting against it, criticizing the reforms proposed as insignificant and insufficient; if no funding bill had been passed, a government shutdown would have occurred on October 1. On September 30, McCarthy introduced a temporary funding bill without the large spending cuts, but also without Ukraine funding; this bill passed the House with 209 Democrats and 126 Republicans in favor; one Democrat and 90 Republicans voted against it. The shutdown was prevented when the Senate passed the bill and President Biden signed it into law. McCarthy told the media, "Democrats tried to do everything they can not to let [the bill] pass".

After funding the government with Democratic support, McCarthy said, "If somebody wants to remove me because I want to be the adult in the room, go ahead and try". On October 3, Representative Matt Gaetz filed a motion to vacate the speakership: Gaetz criticized McCarthy for working with Democrats to pass a spending bill which did not include fiscally conservative reforms. Immediately thereafter, an attempt to remove the motion through a motion to table was filed by Representative Tom Cole, a McCarthy ally, but it was voted down by House Democrats and eleven Republicans. The vote to vacate passed with 216 in favor and 210 opposed, removing McCarthy as speaker. This was the first time in U.S. history that the House of Representatives had removed its speaker from office. Voting to remove McCarthy were all House Democrats and eight House Republicans: Gaetz, Andy Biggs, Ken Buck, Tim Burchett, Eli Crane, Bob Good, Nancy Mace, and Matt Rosendale. After the vote, McCarthy announced he would not seek the speakership again.

=== Post-speakership and resignation from Congress ===
McCarthy announcing his retirement

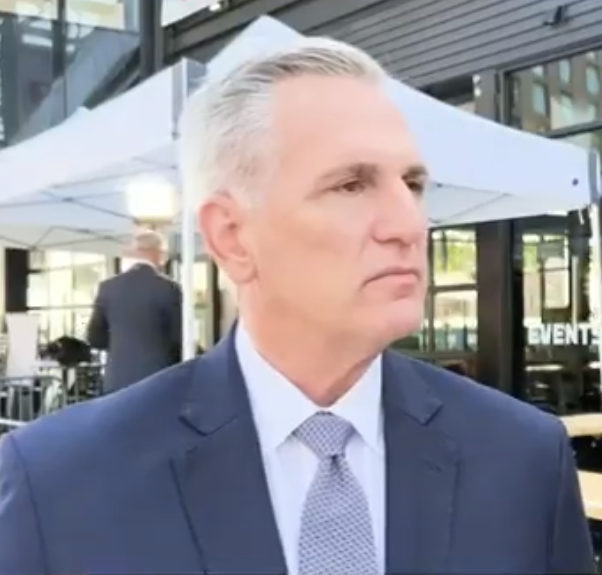
McCarthy attending the 2024 Republican National Convention

On December 6, 2023, McCarthy announced that he would resign from Congress on December 31. On December 14, McCarthy gave his farewell speech to the House; speaking to reporters, he said that leaving the House at this point in his career was "not the timing I wanted". Republican members of California's congressional delegation, in addition to Patrick McHenry and Democrat Steny Hoyer, paid tribute to McCarthy on the House floor. A few months later, when asked at a Georgetown event, McCarthy said, "I'll give you the truth why I'm not speaker. It's because one person, a member of Congress, wanted me to stop an ethics complaint because he slept with a 17-year-old ... did he do it or not? I don't know." The conversation was interpreted as questioning Gaetz's motives for kickstarting his ouster.

After his ouster, he continues to be a major fundraiser, assisting Speaker Mike Johnson with campaign finance via his SuperPAC, the Congressional Leadership Fund.

== Personal life ==
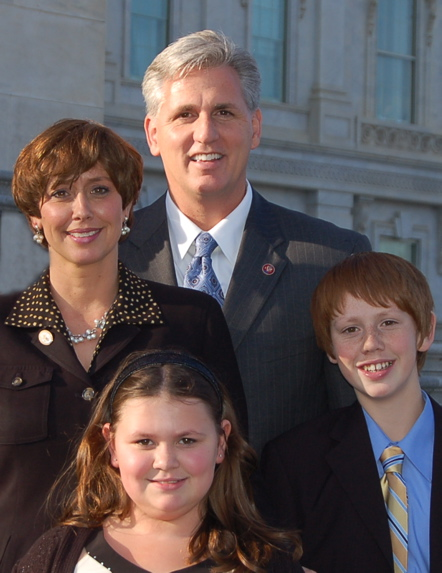
McCarthy and his wife Judy with their children during the 110th Congressional swearing-in in 2007

McCarthy and his wife, Judy, have two children. They are lifelong residents of Bakersfield.

In October 2015, McCarthy was accused of having an affair with Representative Renee Ellmers. He had unexpectedly dropped out of the race for speaker of the House shortly before the allegations surfaced. Days earlier, Representative Walter B. Jones Jr. had sent Republican Conference chair Cathy McMorris Rodgers a letter stating that any candidates for a leadership position with "misdeeds" should withdraw from the race. Both McCarthy and Ellmers denied the allegation.

== See also ==
- Political positions of Kevin McCarthy
- Electoral history of Kevin McCarthy

== Notes ==
California Assembly
Preceded by Dave Cox	Minority Leader of the California State Assembly; 2004–2006	Succeeded by George Plescia
U.S. House of Representatives
Preceded by Bill Thomas	Member of the U.S. House of Representatives from California's 22nd congressional district 2007–2013	Succeeded by Devin Nunes
Preceded by Jim Clyburn	House Majority Whip; 2011–2014	Succeeded by Steve Scalise
Preceded by Lois Capps	Member of the U.S. House of Representatives from California's 23rd congressional district 2013–2023	Succeeded by Jay Obernolte
Preceded by Eric Cantor	House Majority Leader; 2014–2019	Succeeded by Steny Hoyer
Preceded by Nancy Pelosi	House Minority Leader; 2019–2023	Succeeded by Hakeem Jeffries
Preceded by Jimmy Panetta	Member of the U.S. House of Representatives from California's 20th congressional district 2023	Succeeded by Vince Fong
Party political offices
Preceded by Eric Cantor	House Republican Chief Deputy Whip; 2009–2011	Succeeded by Peter Roskam
Preceded by Eric Cantor	House Republican Deputy Leader; 2014–2019	Succeeded by Steve Scalise
Preceded by Paul Ryan	House Republican Leader; 2019–2023	Succeeded by Mike Johnson
Political offices
Preceded by Nancy Pelosi	Speaker of the United States House of Representatives; 2023	Succeeded by Patrick McHenry as Speaker pro tempore
U.S. order of precedence (ceremonial)
Preceded by Paul Ryan as Former Speaker of the U.S. House of Representatives	Order of precedence of the United States as Former Speaker of the U.S. House of Representatives	Succeeded by Dick Gephardt as Former House Majority Leader
