= 2020 United States House of Representatives elections in Texas =

- November 3, 2020

All 36 Texas seats to the United States House of Representatives
	Majority party	Minority party
Party	Republican	Democratic
Last election	23	13
Seats won	23	13
Seat change	Steady	Steady
Popular vote	5,926,712	4,896,383
Percentage	53.43%	44.14%
Swing	▲3.03%	▼2.86%

Republican
40–50%
50–60%
60–70%
70–80%
80–90%
>90%
Democratic
40–50%
50–60%
60–70%
70–80%

The 2020 United States House of Representatives elections in Texas were held on November 3, 2020, to elect the 36 U.S. representatives from the state of Texas, one from each of the state's 36 congressional districts. The elections coincided with the 2020 U.S. presidential election, as well as other elections to the House of Representatives, elections to the U.S. Senate, and various state and local elections. Primaries were held on March 3, and run-offs were held on July 14.

During the election cycle, a number of House races were considered vulnerable by Democrats and polls. However, in the wake of the election, Republicans were able to retain control over all of those seats. Democratic-held 15th district also became unexpectedly competitive, with incumbent representative Vicente Gonzalez attaining a narrow win over the Republican challenger. Republican wins were attributed to President Donald Trump appearing on the ballot and his unexpectedly strong support from Latino voters.

== Ballot litigation ==
Some Green Party candidates were removed from the ballot due to a failure to pay filing fees. However, in September 2020, the Texas Supreme Court rejected a Republican attempt to remove 44 Libertarian Party candidates from the November 2020 general election ballot because they had failed to pay filing fees. The court ruled that the Republicans had missed the state Election Code's deadline to raise such a challenge.

== Overview ==
=== Statewide ===
Party	Candidates	Votes		Seats		
Party	Candidates	No.	%	No.	+/–	%
Republican	36	5,926,712	53.43%	23	Steady	63.9%
Democratic	36	4,896,383	44.14%	13	Steady	36.1%
Libertarian	32	222,388	2.00%	0	Steady	0.0%
Independent	7	41,253	0.37%	0	Steady	0.0%
Green	2	5,135	0.05%	0	Steady	0.0%
Write-in	2	1,453	0.01%	0	Steady	0.0%
Total	115	11,093,324	100%	36	Steady	100%

Popular vote
Republican	53.43%
Democratic	44.14%
Libertarian	2.00%
Independent	0.37%
Green	0.05%
Write-in	0.01%

House seats
Republican	63.9%
Democratic	36.1%

=== District ===
Results of the 2020 United States House of Representatives elections in Texas by district:

District	Republican		Democratic		Others		Total		Result
District	Votes	%	Votes	%	Votes	%	Votes	%	Result
District 1	219,726	72.58%	83,016	27.42%	0	0.00%	302,742	100.00%	Republican hold
District 2	192,828	55.61%	148,374	42.79%	5,524	1.59%	346,726	100.00%	Republican hold
District 3	230,512	55.07%	179,458	42.87%	8,621	2.06%	418,591	100.00%	Republican hold
District 4	253,837	75.14%	76,236	22.57%	7,640	2.26%	337,803	100.00%	Republican hold
District 5	173,836	61.99%	100,743	35.93%	5,834	2.08%	280,413	100.00%	Republican hold
District 6	179,507	52.80%	149,530	43.98%	10,955	3.22%	339,992	100.00%	Republican hold
District 7	149,054	47.45%	159,529	50.79%	5,542	1.76%	314,125	100.00%	Democratic hold
District 8	277,327	72.51%	97,409	25.47%	7,735	2.02%	382,471	100.00%	Republican hold
District 9	49,575	21.64%	172,938	75.48%	6,594	2.88%	229,107	100.00%	Democratic hold
District 10	217,216	52.48%	187,686	45.35%	8,992	2.17%	413,894	100.00%	Republican hold
District 11	232,568	79.71%	53,394	18.30%	5,811	1.99%	291,773	100.00%	Republican hold
District 12	233,853	63.72%	121,250	33.04%	11,918	3.25%	367,021	100.00%	Republican hold
District 13	217,124	79.38%	50,477	18.46%	5,907	2.16%	273,508	100.00%	Republican hold
District 14	190,541	61.64%	118,574	38.36%	0	0.00%	309,115	100.00%	Republican hold
District 15	109,017	47.62%	115,605	50.50%	4,295	1.88%	228,917	100.00%	Democratic hold
District 16	84,006	35.28%	154,108	64.72%	0	0.00%	238,114	100.00%	Democratic hold
District 17	171,390	55.85%	125,565	40.92%	9,918	3.23%	306,873	100.00%	Republican hold
District 18	58,033	23.50%	180,952	73.29%	7,910	3.20%	246,895	100.00%	Democratic hold
District 19	198,198	74.78%	60,583	22.86%	6,271	2.37%	265,052	100.00%	Republican hold
District 20	89,628	33.11%	175,078	64.67%	6,017	2.22%	270,723	100.00%	Democratic hold
District 21	235,740	51.95%	205,780	45.35%	12,230	2.70%	453,750	100.00%	Republican hold
District 22	210,259	51.53%	181,998	44.60%	15,791	3.87%	408,048	100.00%	Republican hold
District 23	149,395	50.56%	137,693	46.60%	8,369	2.83%	295,457	100.00%	Republican hold
District 24	167,910	48.81%	163,326	47.48%	12,785	3.72%	344,021	100.00%	Republican hold
District 25	220,088	55.93%	165,697	42.11%	7,738	1.97%	393,523	100.00%	Republican hold
District 26	261,963	60.61%	161,009	37.25%	9,243	2.14%	432,215	100.00%	Republican hold
District 27	172,305	63.06%	95,446	34.93%	5,482	2.01%	273,253	100.00%	Republican hold
District 28	91,925	38.98%	137,494	58.30%	6,425	2.72%	235,844	100.00%	Democratic hold
District 29	42,840	27.38%	111,305	71.13%	2,328	1.49%	156,473	100.00%	Democratic hold
District 30	48,685	18.41%	204,928	77.49%	10,851	4.10%	264,464	100.00%	Democratic hold
District 31	212,695	53.43%	176,293	44.29%	9,069	2.28%	398,057	100.00%	Republican hold
District 32	157,867	45.93%	178,542	51.95%	7,278	2.12%	343,687	100.00%	Democratic hold
District 33	39,638	25.15%	105,317	66.82%	12,651	8.03%	157,606	100.00%	Democratic hold
District 34	84,119	41.85%	111,439	55.43%	5,457	2.72%	201,027	100.00%	Democratic hold
District 35	80,795	29.95%	176,373	65.37%	12,629	4.68%	269,797	100.00%	Democratic hold
District 36	222,712	73.61%	73,148	24.18%	6,419	2.12%	302,549	100.00%	Republican hold
Total	5,926,712	53.42%	4,896,293	44.14%	270,229	2.44%	11,093,626	100.00%	

== District 1 ==
2020 Texas's 1st congressional district election
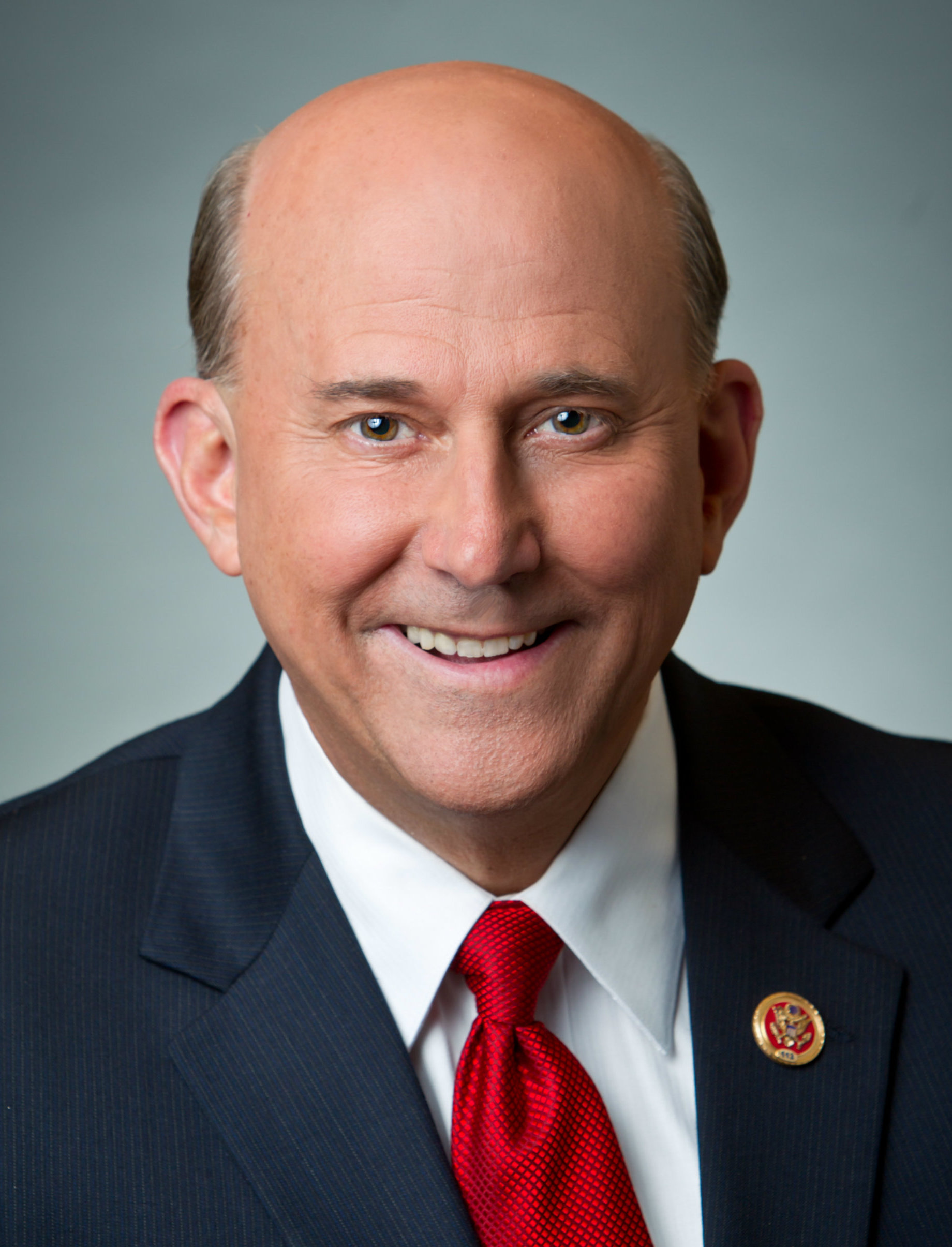

Nominee	Louie Gohmert	Hank Gilbert
Party	Republican	Democratic
Popular vote	219,726	83,016
Percentage	72.6%	27.4%
- Gohmert: 50–60% 60–70% 70–80% 80–90% >90% Gilbert: 50–60% 60–70% 70–80% 80–90% >90% Tie: 50%
U.S. Representative before election
Louie Gohmert
Republican
Elected U.S. Representative
Louie Gohmert
Republican

The 1st district encompasses Deep East Texas, taking in Tyler, Lufkin, Nacogdoches, Longview, and Marshall. The incumbent was Republican Louie Gohmert, who was re-elected with 72.3% of the vote in 2018.

=== Republican primary ===
==== Candidates ====
===== Nominee =====
- Louie Gohmert, incumbent U.S. representative

===== Eliminated in primary =====
- Johnathan Davidson, data architect

==== Primary results ====
Republican primary results
Party	Candidate	Votes	%
Republican	Louie Gohmert (incumbent)	83,887	89.7
Republican	Johnathan Davidson	9,659	10.3
Total votes		93,546	100.0

=== Democratic primary ===
==== Candidates ====
===== Nominee =====
- Hank Gilbert, rancher and businessman

==== Primary results ====
Democratic primary results
Party	Candidate	Votes	%
Democratic	Hank Gilbert	25,037	100.0
Total votes		25,037	100.0

=== Endorsements ===
Hank Gilbert (D)

Labor unions

- Texas AFL-CIO

=== General election ===
==== Predictions ====
Source	Ranking	As of
The Cook Political Report	Safe R	July 16, 2020
FiveThirtyEight	Solid R	October 13, 2020
Inside Elections	Safe R	June 2, 2020
Sabato's Crystal Ball	Safe R	July 2, 2020
Politico	Safe R	July 21, 2020
Daily Kos	Safe R	June 3, 2020
RCP	Safe R	June 9, 2020
270toWin	Safe R	June 7, 2020

==== Results ====
Texas's 1st congressional district, 2020
Party	Candidate	Votes	%
Republican	Louie Gohmert (incumbent)	219,726	72.6
Democratic	Hank Gilbert	83,016	27.4
Total votes		302,742	100.0
Republican hold			

== District 2 ==
2020 Texas's 2nd congressional district election
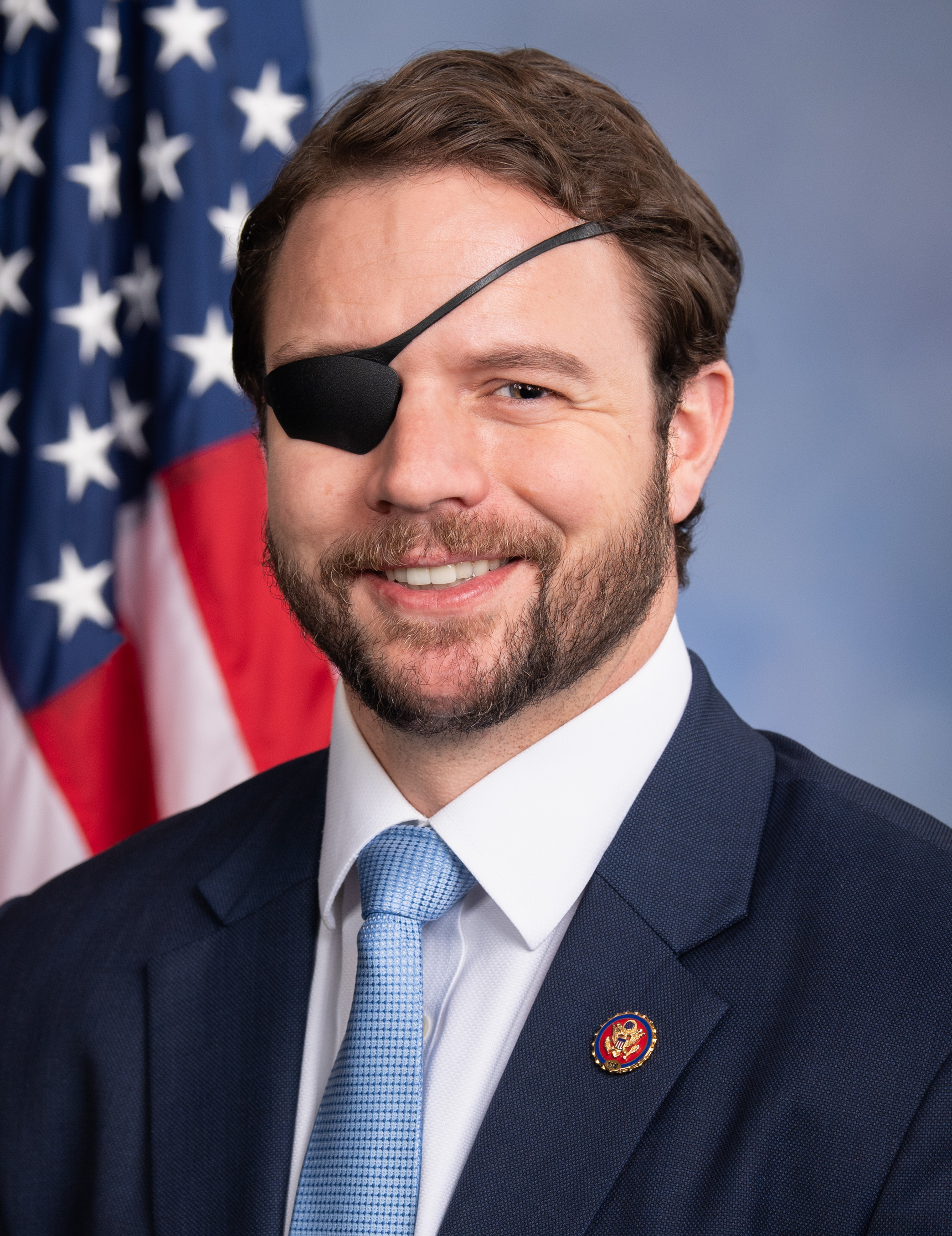

Nominee	Dan Crenshaw	Sima Ladjevardian
Party	Republican	Democratic
Popular vote	192,828	148,374
Percentage	55.6%	42.8%
- County results Crenshaw: 50–60%
U.S. Representative before election
Dan Crenshaw
Republican
Elected U.S. Representative
Dan Crenshaw
Republican

The 2nd district is based in northern and western Houston. The incumbent was Republican Dan Crenshaw, who was elected with 52.8% of the vote in 2018.

=== Republican primary ===
==== Candidates ====
===== Nominee =====
- Dan Crenshaw, incumbent U.S. representative

==== Primary results ====
Republican primary results
Party	Candidate	Votes	%
Republican	Dan Crenshaw (incumbent)	53,938	100.0
Total votes		53,938	100.0

=== Democratic primary ===
==== Candidates ====
===== Nominee =====
- Sima Ladjevardian, attorney, philanthropist, fundraiser, and advisor to Beto O'Rourke during his 2018 U.S. Senate campaign and 2020 presidential campaign

===== Withdrew before runoff =====
- Elisa Cardnell, U.S. Navy veteran and science teacher

===== Eliminated in primary =====
- Travis Olsen, former Homeland Security Department employee

==== Primary results ====
Democratic primary results
Party	Candidate	Votes	%
Democratic	Sima Ladjevardian	26,536	47.6
Democratic	Elisa Cardnell	17,279	31.0
Democratic	Travis Olsen	11,881	21.4
Total votes		55,696	100.0

==== Runoff results ====
No runoff was held after runoff-advanced candidate Elisa Cardnell suspended her campaign and supported Ladjevardian.

=== Endorsements ===
Dan Crenshaw (R)

Publications

- Houston Chronicle
Sima Ladjevardian (D)

U.S. presidents

- Barack Obama, 44th president of the United States

U.S. vice presidents

- Joe Biden, 47th vice president of the United States and 2020 Democratic nominee for president

Federal officials

- Cory Booker, U.S. senator from New Jersey (2013–present)
- Julian Castro, former Secretary of Housing and Urban Development (2014–2017)
- Veronica Escobar, U.S. representative from Texas (2019–present)
- Sylvia Garcia, U.S. representative from Texas (2019–present)
- Al Green, U.S. representative from Texas (2005–present)
- Sheila Jackson Lee, U.S. representative from Texas (1995–present)
- Beto O'Rourke, former U.S. representative from Texas (2013–2019)
- Sylvester Turner, mayor of Houston
- Elizabeth Warren, U.S. senator from Massachusetts (2013–present)

Organizations

- AFL-CIO
- EMILY's List
- End Citizens United
- Giffords
- Human Rights Campaign
- League of Conservation Voters Action Fund
- Planned Parenthood Action Fund

=== General election ===
==== Predictions ====
Source	Ranking	As of
The Cook Political Report	Likely R	October 21, 2020
FiveThirtyEight	Solid R	October 25, 2020
Inside Elections	Safe R	October 28, 2020
Sabato's Crystal Ball	Likely R	October 20, 2020
Politico	Lean R	October 11, 2020
Daily Kos	Likely R	April 29, 2020
RCP	Safe R	October 25, 2020
270toWin	Likely R	October 21, 2020

==== Results ====
Texas's 2nd congressional district, 2020
Party	Candidate	Votes	%
Republican	Dan Crenshaw (incumbent)	192,828	55.6
Democratic	Sima Ladjevardian	148,374	42.8
Libertarian	Elliott Scheirman	5,524	1.6
Total votes		346,726	100.0
Republican hold			

== District 3 ==
2020 Texas's 3rd congressional district election
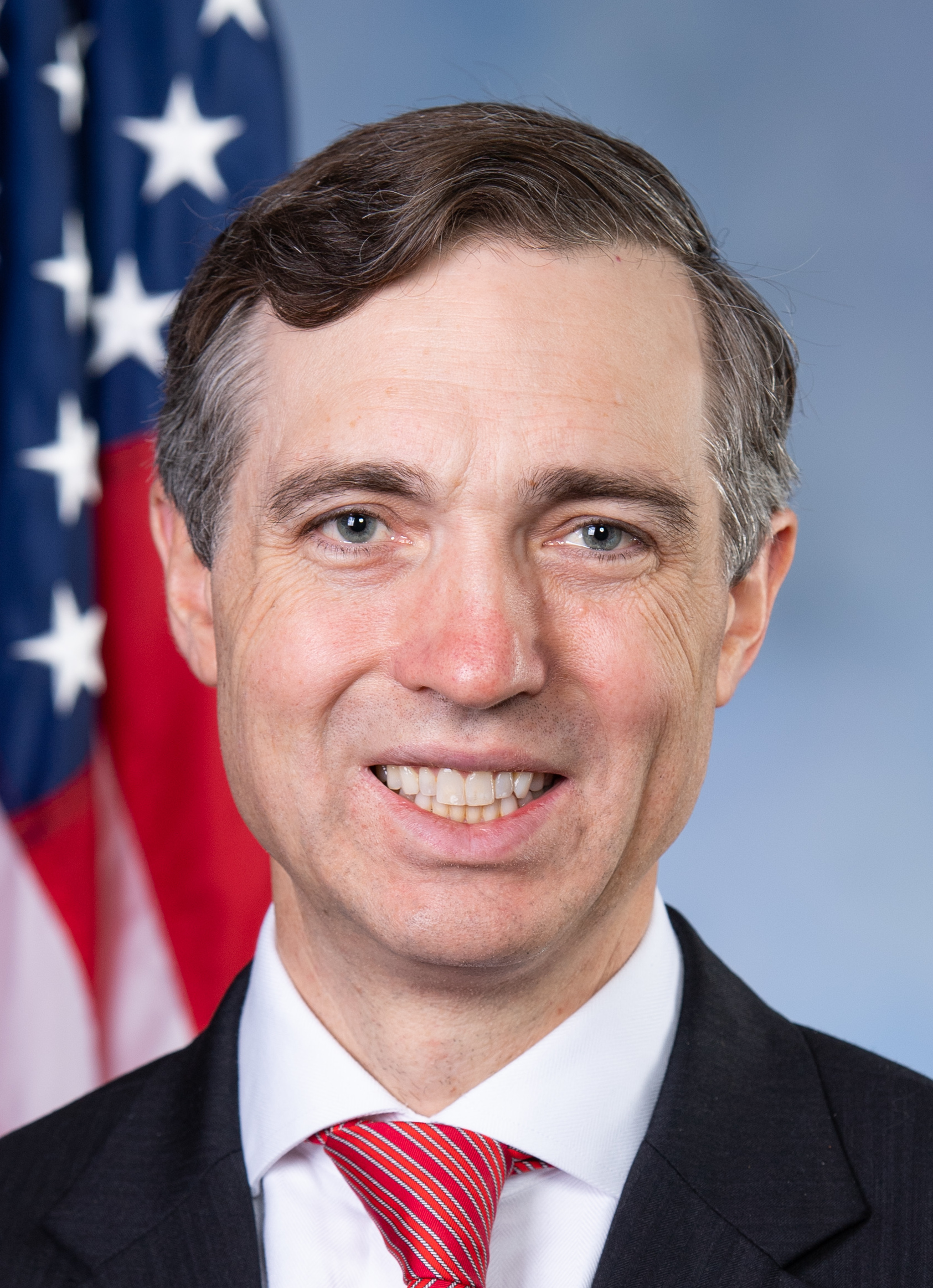

Nominee	Van Taylor	Lulu Seikaly
Party	Republican	Democratic
Popular vote	230,512	179,458
Percentage	55.1%	42.9%
- Precinct results Taylor: 40–50% 50–60% 60–70% 70–80% 80–90% Seikaly: 40–50% 50–60% 60–70% 70–80%
U.S. Representative before election
Van Taylor
Republican
Elected U.S. Representative
Van Taylor
Republican

The 3rd district is based in the suburbs north and northeast of Dallas, encompassing a large portion of Collin County including McKinney, Plano, and Frisco, as well as Collin County's share of Dallas itself. The incumbent was Republican Van Taylor, who was elected with 54.2% of the vote in 2018.

=== Republican primary ===
==== Candidates ====
===== Nominee =====
- Van Taylor, incumbent U.S. representative

==== Primary results ====
Republican primary results
Party	Candidate	Votes	%
Republican	Van Taylor (incumbent)	53,938	100.0
Total votes		53,938	100.0

=== Democratic primary ===
==== Candidates ====
===== Nominee =====
- Lulu Seikaly, attorney

===== Eliminated in runoff =====
- Sean McCaffity, trial attorney

===== Eliminated in primary =====
- Tanner Do, activist and insurance adjuster

===== Withdrawn =====
- Lorie Burch, attorney and nominee for Texas's 3rd congressional district in 2018

==== Primary results ====
Democratic primary results
Party	Candidate	Votes	%
Democratic	Lulu Seikaly	28,250	44.6
Democratic	Sean McCaffity	27,736	43.7
Democratic	Tanner Do	7,433	11.7
Total votes		63,419	100.0

==== Runoff results ====
Democratic primary runoff results
Party	Candidate	Votes	%
Democratic	Lulu Seikaly	20,617	60.7
Democratic	Sean McCaffity	13,339	39.3
Total votes		33,956	100.0

=== Libertarian primary ===
==== Nominee ====
- Christopher Claytor

=== General election ===
==== Predictions ====
Source	Ranking	As of
The Cook Political Report	Lean R	November 2, 2020
FiveThirtyEight	Likely R	November 2, 2020
Inside Elections	Lean R	November 2, 2020
Sabato's Crystal Ball	Likely R	November 2, 2020
Politico	Lean R	November 2, 2020
Daily Kos	Likely R	November 2, 2020
RCP	Safe R	November 2, 2020
270toWin	Lean R	November 2, 2020

==== Polling ====
Poll source	Date(s) administered	Sample size (Note: Key: A – all adults RV – registered voters LV – likely voters V – unclear)	Margin of error	Van Taylor (R)	Lulu Seikaly (D)	Christopher Claytor (L)	Undecided
DCCC Targeting & Analytics Department (D) (Note: Poll sponsored by the DCCC, which has endorsed Seikaly prior to the sampling period.)	October 19–22, 2020	432 (LV)	± 4.2%	42%	44%	8%	6% (Note: Includes "Refused")
Global Strategy Group (D) (Note: Poll sponsored by Lulu Seikaly's campaign and DCCC.)	September 10–15, 2020	400 (LV)	± 4.9%	44%	43%	–	–
Public Opinion Strategies (R) (Note: Poll sponsored by Van Taylor's campaign)	August 1–5, 2020	500 (LV)	± 4.9%	48%	35%	8%	9%
Global Strategy Group (D) (Note: Poll sponsored by Lulu Seikaly's campaign)	July 17–20, 2020	400 (LV)	± 4.9%	43%	37%	5%	5%

Hypothetical polling

with Generic Republican and Generic Democrat

Poll source	Date(s) administered	Sample size	Margin of error	Generic Republican	Generic Democrat
Global Strategy Group (D)	July 17–20, 2020	400 (LV)	± 4.9%	45%	42%

==== Results ====
Texas's 3rd congressional district, 2020
Party	Candidate	Votes	%
Republican	Van Taylor (incumbent)	230,512	55.1
Democratic	Lulu Seikaly	179,458	42.9
Libertarian	Christopher Claytor	8,621	2.1
Total votes		418,591	100.0
Republican hold			

== District 4 ==
2020 Texas's 4th congressional district election
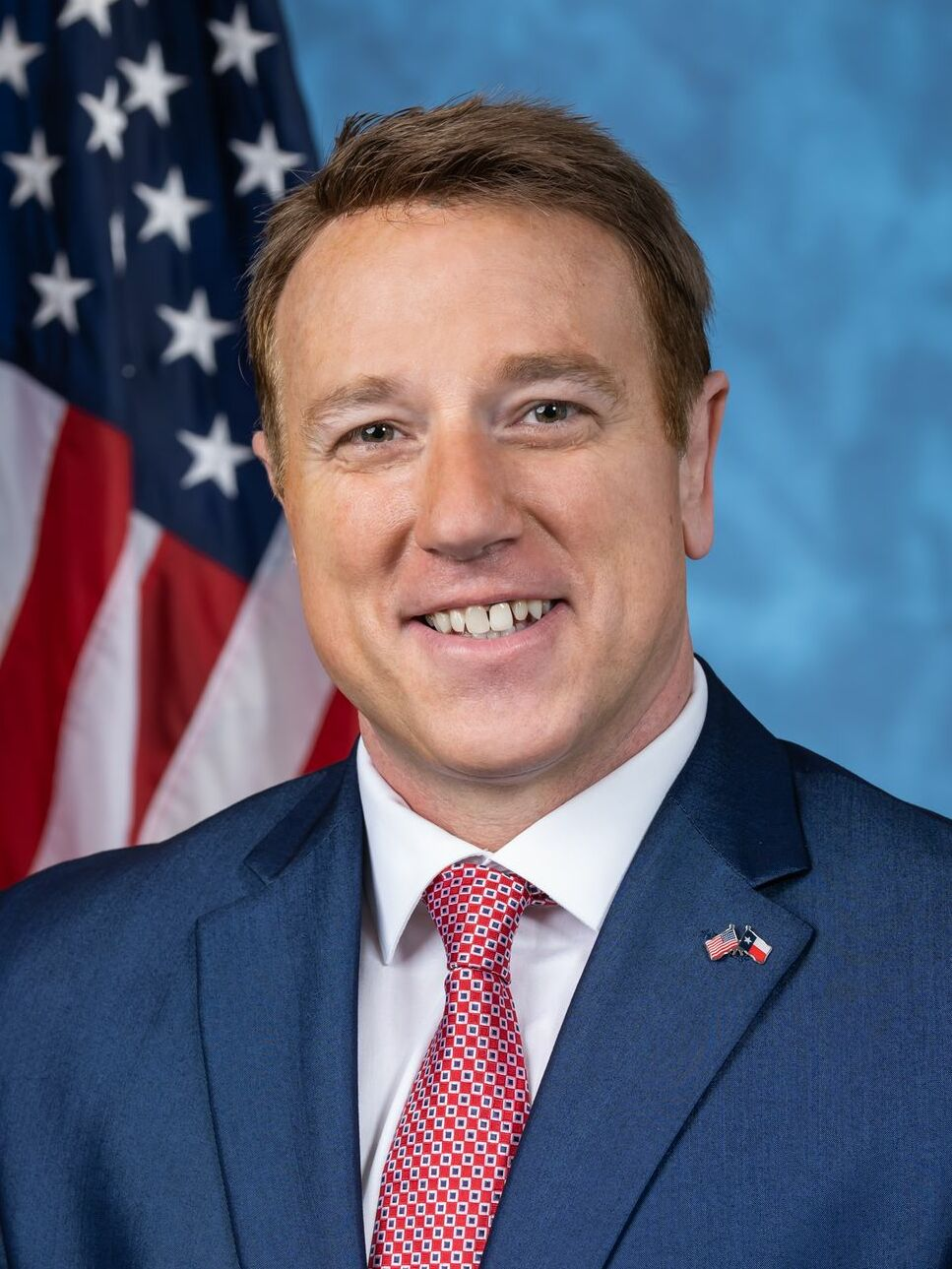

Nominee	Pat Fallon	Russell Foster
Party	Republican	Democratic
Popular vote	253,837	76,326
Percentage	75.1%	22.6%
U.S. Representative before election
John Ratcliffe
Republican
Elected U.S. Representative
Pat Fallon
Republican

The 4th district encompasses Northeastern Texas taking in counties along the Red River and spreading to the parts of the northeastern exurbs of the Dallas–Fort Worth metro area. The incumbent was Republican John Ratcliffe, who was elected with 75.7% of the vote in 2018.

President Trump nominated Ratcliffe to succeed Dan Coats as the Director of National Intelligence in February 2020. The Senate confirmed his nomination in May, and Ratcliffe resigned from the House. Republicans selected a new nominee on August 8.

=== Republican primary ===
==== Candidates ====
===== Nominee =====
- Pat Fallon, state senator for Texas District 30, from Denton County, Texas

===== Eliminated at convention =====
- Trace Johannesen, Rockwall city councilman
- Jim Pruitt, mayor of Rockwall
- Travis Ransom, mayor of Atlanta
- Jason Ross, former district chief of staff for U.S. Representative John Ratcliffe
- Robert West, farmer from Cooper, Texas

==== Withdrawn ====
- John Ratcliffe, incumbent U.S. representative

==== Primary results ====
Republican primary results
Party	Candidate	Votes	%
Republican	John Ratcliffe (incumbent)	92,373	100.0
Total votes		92,373	100.0

=== Democratic primary ===
==== Candidates ====
===== Nominee =====
- Russell Foster, IT technician

==== Primary results ====
Democratic primary results
Party	Candidate	Votes	%
Democratic	Russell Foster	24,970	100.0
Total votes		24,970	100.0

=== General election ===
==== Predictions ====
Source	Ranking	As of
The Cook Political Report	Safe R	July 2, 2020
FiveThirtyEight	Solid R	October 13, 2020
Inside Elections	Safe R	June 2, 2020
Sabato's Crystal Ball	Safe R	July 2, 2020
Politico	Safe R	April 19, 2020
Daily Kos	Safe R	June 3, 2020
RCP	Safe R	June 9, 2020
270toWin	Safe R	June 7, 2020

==== Results ====
Texas's 4th congressional district, 2020
Party	Candidate	Votes	%
Republican	Pat Fallon	253,837	75.1
Democratic	Russell Foster	76,326	22.6
Libertarian	Lou Antonelli	6,334	1.9
Independent	Tracy Jones (write-in)	1,306	0.4
Total votes		337,803	100.0
Republican hold			

== District 5 ==
2020 Texas's 5th congressional district election
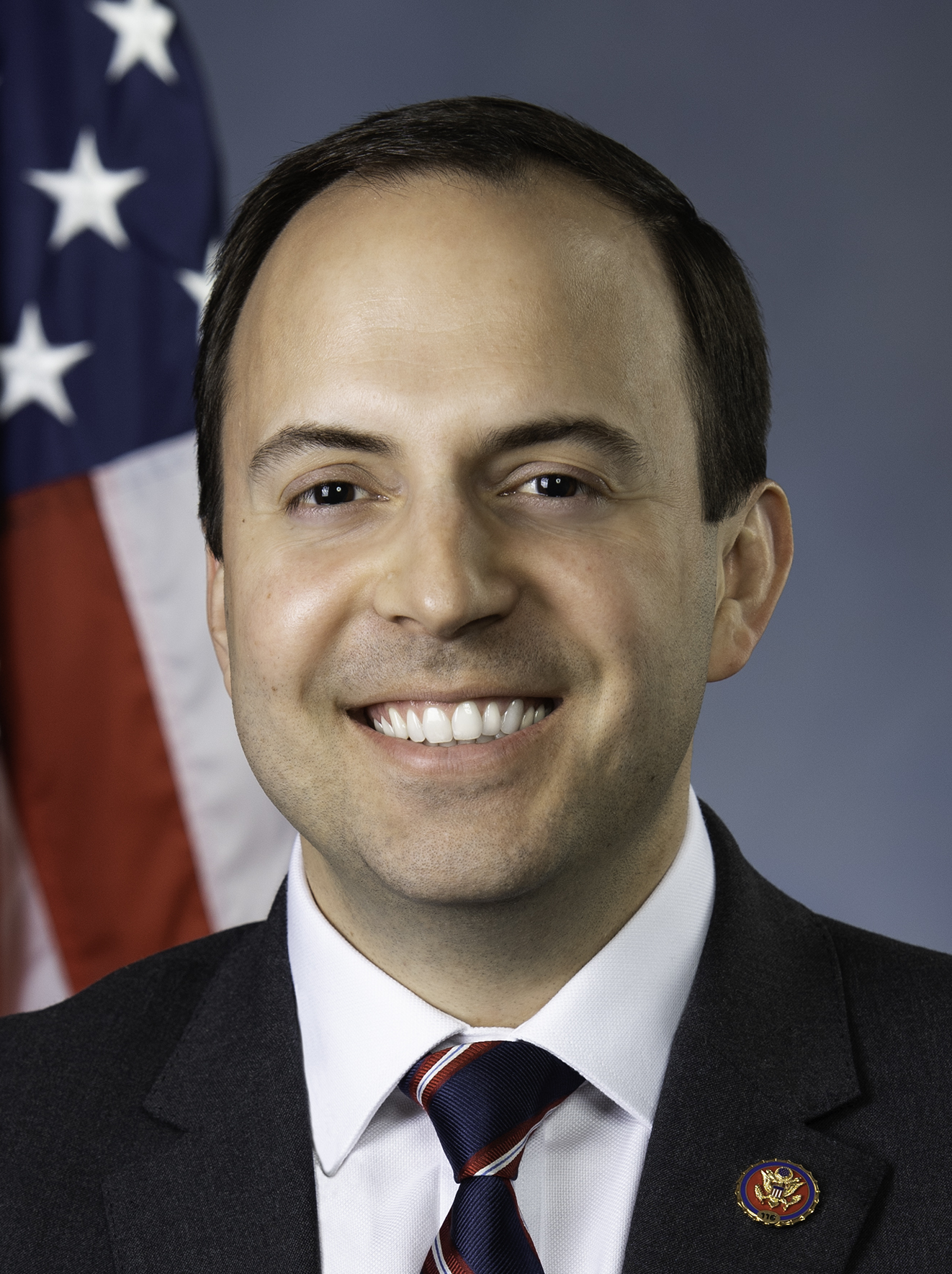

Nominee	Lance Gooden	Carolyn Salter
Party	Republican	Democratic
Popular vote	173,836	100,743
Percentage	62.0%	35.9%
- County results Gooden: 60–70% 70–80% 80–90% Salter: 50–60%
U.S. Representative before election
Lance Gooden
Republican
Elected U.S. Representative
Lance Gooden
Republican

The 5th district takes in the eastern edge of Dallas, as well as the surrounding rural areas. The incumbent was Republican Lance Gooden, who was elected with 62.3% of the vote in 2018.

=== Republican primary ===
==== Candidates ====
===== Nominee =====
- Lance Gooden, incumbent U.S. representative

===== Eliminated in primary =====
- Don Hill, U.S. Army veteran

=== Primary results ===
Republican primary results
Party	Candidate	Votes	%
Republican	Lance Gooden (incumbent)	57,253	83.4
Republican	Don Hill	11,372	16.6
Total votes		68,625	100.0

=== Democratic primary ===
==== Candidates ====
===== Nominee =====
- Carolyn Salter, former mayor of Palestine

Democratic primary results
Party	Candidate	Votes	%
Democratic	Carolyn Salter	34,641	100.0
Total votes		34,641	100.0

=== General election ===
==== Predictions ====
Source	Ranking	As of
The Cook Political Report	Safe R	July 2, 2020
FiveThirtyEight	Solid R	October 13, 2020
Inside Elections	Safe R	June 2, 2020
Sabato's Crystal Ball	Safe R	July 2, 2020
Politico	Safe R	April 19, 2020
Daily Kos	Safe R	June 3, 2020
RCP	Safe R	June 9, 2020
270toWin	Safe R	June 7, 2020

==== Results ====
Texas's 5th congressional district, 2020
Party	Candidate	Votes	%
Republican	Lance Gooden (incumbent)	173,836	62.0
Democratic	Carolyn Salter	100,743	35.9
Libertarian	Kevin Hale	5,834	2.1
Total votes		280,413	100.0
Republican hold			

== District 6 ==
2020 Texas's 6th congressional district election
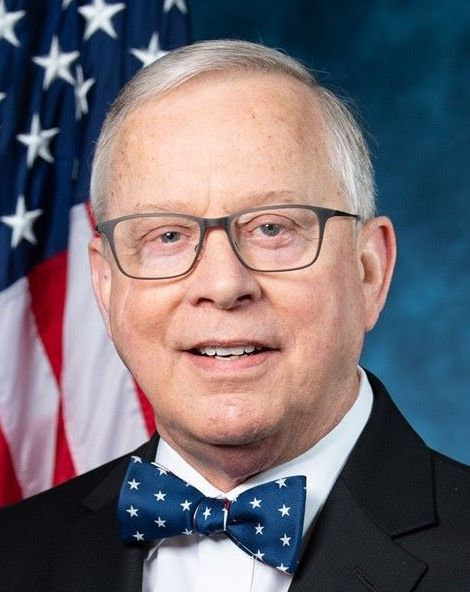

Nominee	Ron Wright	Stephen Daniel
Party	Republican	Democratic
Popular vote	179,507	149,530
Percentage	52.8%	44.0%
- County results Wright: 60–70% 70–80% Daniel: 50–60%
U.S. Representative before election
Ron Wright
Republican
Elected U.S. Representative
Ron Wright
Republican

The 6th district takes in parts of Arlington and rural areas south of Dallas including Ellis County. The incumbent was Republican Ron Wright, who was elected with 53.1% of the vote in 2018.

=== Republican primary ===
==== Candidates ====
===== Nominee =====
- Ron Wright, incumbent U.S. representative

==== Primary results ====
Republican primary results
Party	Candidate	Votes	%
Republican	Ron Wright (incumbent)	55,759	100.0
Total votes		55,759	100.0

=== Democratic primary ===
==== Candidates ====
===== Nominee =====
- Stephen Daniel, attorney

==== Endorsements ====
Stephen Daniel

State officials

- Sarah Weddington, former state representative

Local officials

- Clay Jenkins, Dallas County judge

Organizations

- League of Conservation Voters Action Fund
- Sierra Club

==== Primary results ====
Democratic primary results
Party	Candidate	Votes	%
Democratic	Stephen Daniel	47,996	100.0
Total votes		47,996	100.0

=== General election ===
==== Predictions ====
Source	Ranking	As of
The Cook Political Report	Likely R	November 2, 2020
FiveThirtyEight	Likely R	November 2, 2020
Inside Elections	Likely R	November 2, 2020
Sabato's Crystal Ball	Likely R	November 2, 2020
Politico	Lean R	November 2, 2020
Daily Kos	Likely R	November 2, 2020
RCP	Safe R	November 2, 2020
270toWin	Likely R	November 2, 2020

==== Polling ====
Poll source	Date(s) administered	Sample size	Margin of error	Ron Wright (R)	Stephen Daniel (D)	Undecided
GBAO Strategies (D) (Note: Poll sponsored by Daniel's campaign)	October 13–17, 2020	400 (LV)	± 4.9%	45%	41%	–
DCCC Targeting & Analytics (D) (Note: Poll conducted by the Democratic Congressional Campaign Committee.)	June 24–28, 2020	376 (LV)	± 4.8%	45%	41%	15%

Hypothetical polling

with Generic Republican and Generic Democrat

Poll source	Date(s) administered	Sample size	Margin of error	Generic Republican	Generic Democrat	Other
GBAO Strategies/Stephen Daniel	October 13–17, 2020	400 (LV)	± 4.9%	46%	44%	–
DCCC	June 24–28, 2020	376 (LV)	–	45%	46%	9% (Note: "Blank ballot/refused" with 9%)

==== Results ====
Texas's 6th congressional district, 2020
Party	Candidate	Votes	%
Republican	Ron Wright (incumbent)	179,507	52.8
Democratic	Stephen Daniel	149,530	44.0
Libertarian	Melanie Black	10,955	3.2
Total votes		339,992	100.0
Republican hold			

== District 7 ==
2020 Texas's 7th congressional district election
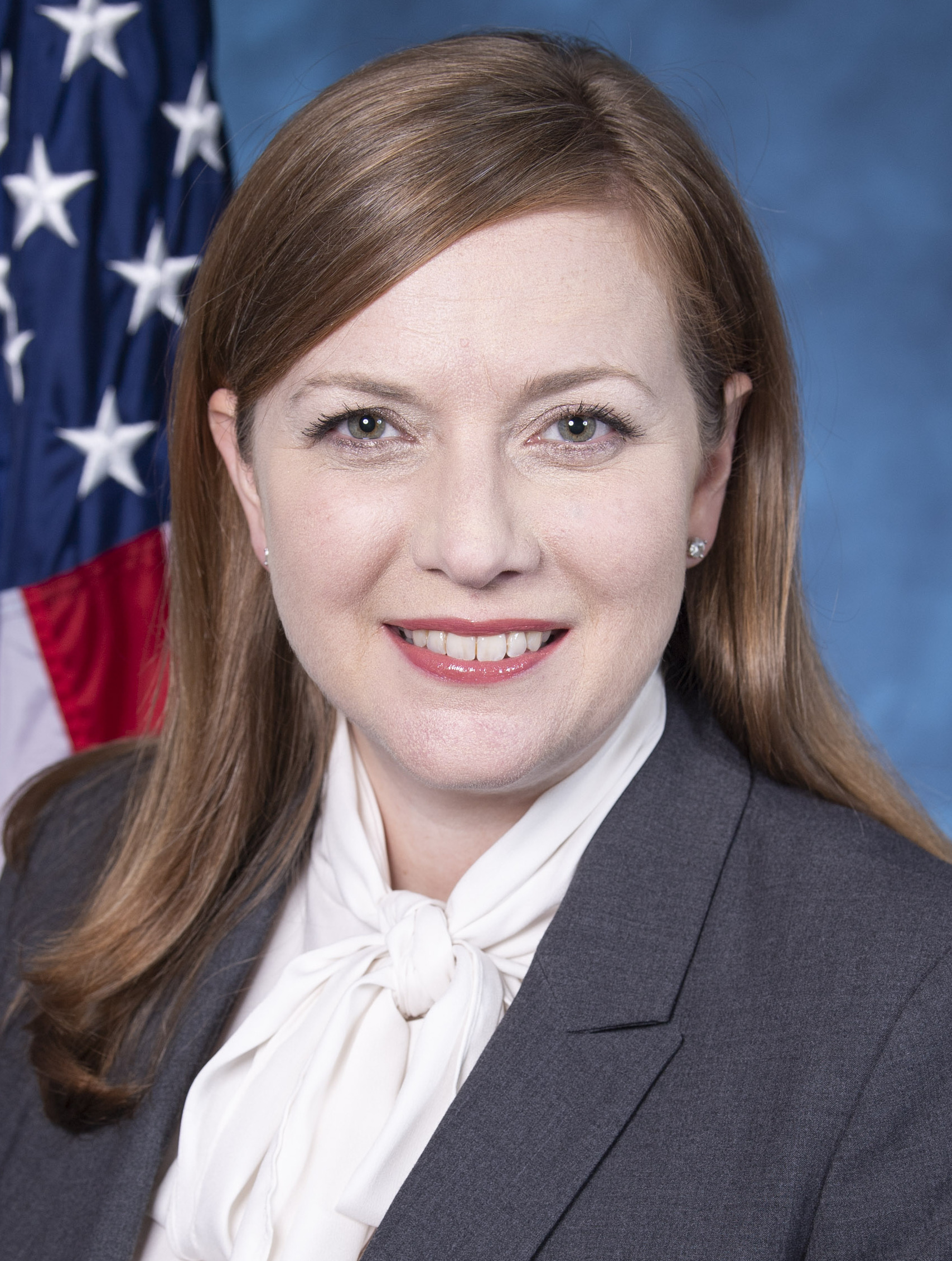

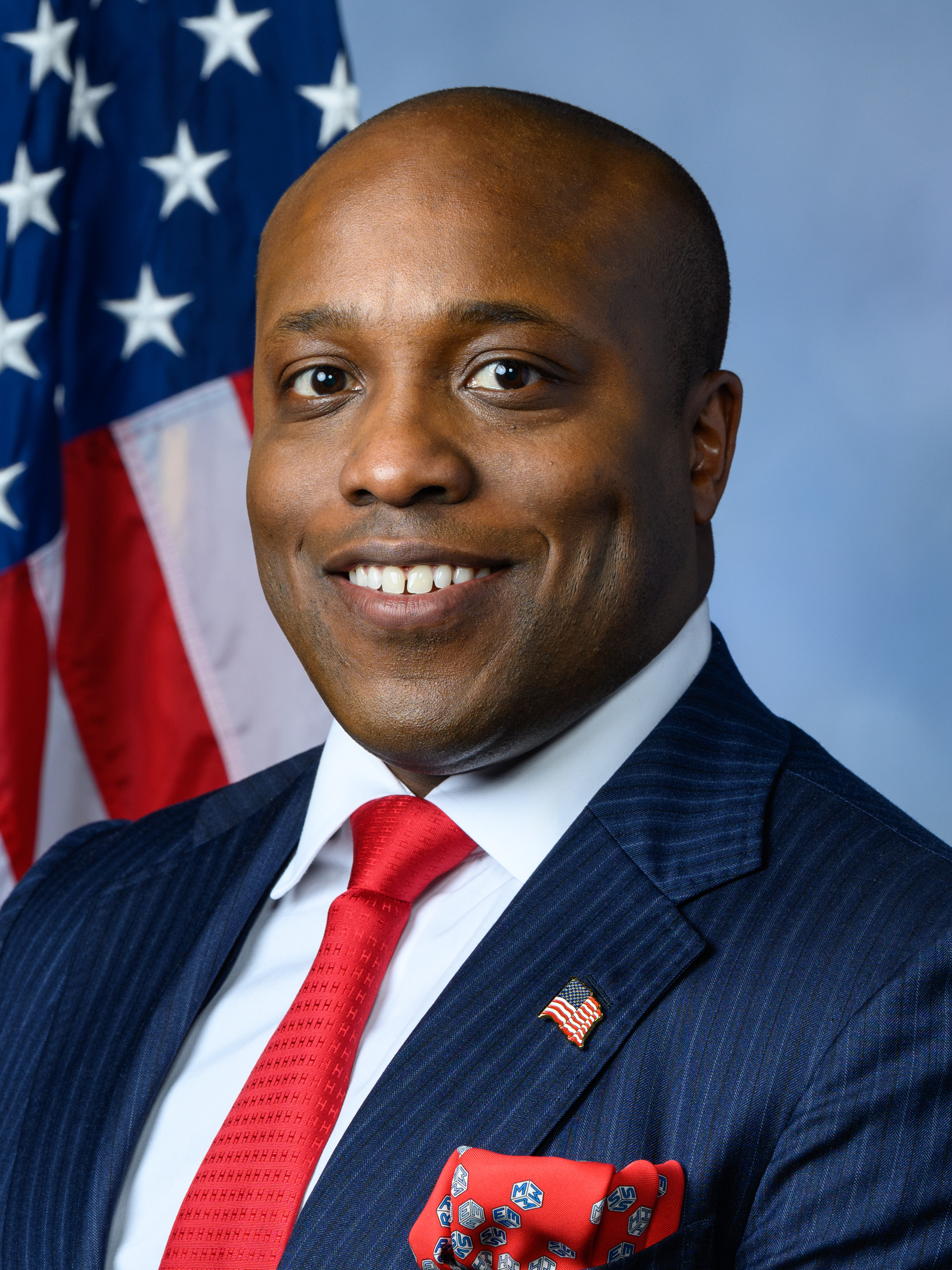
Nominee	Lizzie Fletcher	Wesley Hunt
Party	Democratic	Republican
Popular vote	159,529	149,054
Percentage	50.8%	47.4%
- County results Fletcher: 50–60%
U.S. Representative before election
Lizzie Fletcher
Democratic
Elected U.S. Representative
Lizzie Fletcher
Democratic

The 7th district covers western Houston and its suburbs. The incumbent was Democrat Lizzie Fletcher, who flipped the district and was elected with 52.5% of the vote in 2018.

=== Democratic primary ===
==== Candidates ====
===== Nominee =====
- Lizzie Fletcher, incumbent U.S. representative

==== Primary results ====
Democratic primary results
Party	Candidate	Votes	%
Democratic	Lizzie Fletcher (incumbent)	55,253	100.0
Total votes		55,253	100.0

=== Republican primary ===
==== Candidates ====
===== Nominee =====
- Wesley Hunt, U.S. Army veteran

===== Eliminated in primary =====
- Maria Espinoza, founder of the Remembrance Project
- Kyle Preston, energy consultant
- Laique Rehman, businessman
- Cindy Siegel, former mayor of Bellaire and former board member of the Harris County Metropolitan Transit Authority

===== Declined =====
- Ed Emmett, former Harris County judge

==== Primary results ====
Republican primary results
Party	Candidate	Votes	%
Republican	Wesley Hunt	28,060	61.0
Republican	Cindy Siegel	12,497	27.2
Republican	Maria Espinoza	2,716	5.9
Republican	Kyle Preston	1,363	3.0
Republican	Jim Noteware	937	2.0
Republican	Laique Rehman	424	0.9
Total votes		45,997	100.0

=== General election ===
==== Polling ====
Poll source	Date(s) administered	Sample size	Margin of error	Lizzie Pannill Fletcher (D)	Wesley Hunt (R)	Shawn Kelly (L)	Undecided
GS Strategy Group (R) (Note: Poll sponsored by Wesley Hunt's campaign.)	October 13–15, 2020	400 (LV)	± 4.9%	46%	44%	3%	7%
Remington Research Group (R)	March 4–5, 2020	1,044 (LV)	± 3%	45%	45%	–	10%
TargetPoint Consulting (R) (Note: Poll commissioned by the Congressional Leadership Fund)	August 10–11, 2019	336 (LV)	± 5.3%	43%	45%	–	–

Hypothetical polling

with Generic Opponent

Poll source	Date(s) administered	Sample size	Margin of error	Lizzie Pannill Fletcher (D)	Generic Opponent	Undecided
Remington Research Group (R)	Mar 4–5, 2020	1,044 (LV)	± 3%	42%	41% (Note: "Someone new" with 41%)	17%

==== Predictions ====
Source	Ranking	As of
The Cook Political Report	Likely D	November 2, 2020
FiveThirtyEight	Lean D	November 2, 2020
Inside Elections	Likely D	November 2, 2020
Sabato's Crystal Ball	Likely D	November 2, 2020
Politico	Lean D	November 2, 2020
Daily Kos	Likely D	November 2, 2020
RCP	Lean D	November 2, 2020
270toWin	Likely D	November 2, 2020

==== Endorsements ====
Lizzie Fletcher (D)

U.S. presidents

- Barack Obama, 44th president of the United States

Federal officials

- Amy Klobuchar, U.S. senator from Minnesota; former 2020 presidential candidate

Unions

- National Education Association
- Texas AFL-CIO

Organizations

- Black Economic Alliance
- Brady Campaign
- EMILY's List
- Everytown for Gun Safety
- Giffords
- Human Rights Campaign
- Humane Society of the United States Legislative Fund
- NARAL Pro-Choice America
- National Organization for Women
- New Democrat Coalition
- Planned Parenthood Action Fund
Wesley Hunt (R)

Federal officials

- Ted Cruz, U.S. senator from Texas; former 2016 presidential candidate

Individuals

- Michael Berry, radio host

Organizations

- Susan B. Anthony List

==== Results ====
Texas's 7th congressional district, 2020
Party	Candidate	Votes	%
Democratic	Lizzie Fletcher (incumbent)	159,529	50.8
Republican	Wesley Hunt	149,054	47.4
Libertarian	Shawn Kelly	5,542	1.8
Total votes		314,125	100.0
Democratic hold			

== District 8 ==
2020 Texas's 8th congressional district election
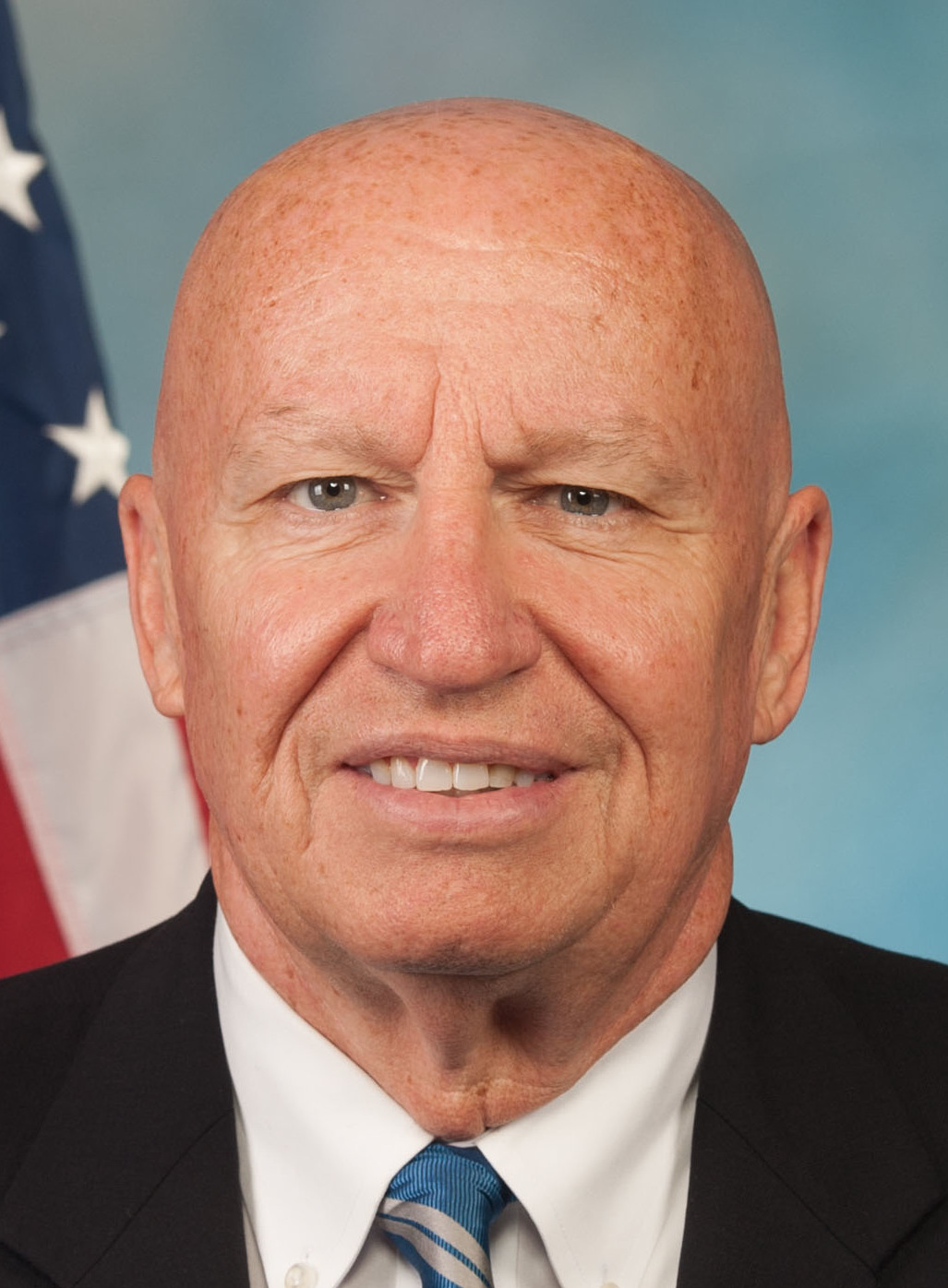

Nominee	Kevin Brady	Elizabeth Hernandez
Party	Republican	Democratic
Popular vote	277,327	97,409
Percentage	72.5%	25.5%
U.S. Representative before election
Kevin Brady
Republican
Elected U.S. Representative
Kevin Brady
Republican

The 8th district encompasses the suburbs and exurbs north of Houston, taking in Spring, The Woodlands, Conroe, and Huntsville. The incumbent was Republican Kevin Brady, who was re-elected with 73.4% of the vote in 2018.

=== Republican primary ===
==== Candidates ====
===== Nominee =====
- Kevin Brady, incumbent U.S. representative

===== Eliminated in primary =====
- Melissa Esparza-Mathis, U.S. Army veteran
- Kirk Osborn, consultant

==== Primary results ====
2020 Texas's 8th congressional district Republican primary results by county Brady: Brady—80–90%; Brady—70–80%

Republican primary results
Party	Candidate	Votes	%
Republican	Kevin Brady (incumbent)	75,044	80.7
Republican	Kirk Osborn	15,048	16.2
Republican	Melissa Esparza-Mathis	2,860	3.1
Total votes		92,952	100.0

=== Democratic primary ===
==== Candidates ====
===== Nominee =====
- Elizabeth Hernandez, accounts payable associate

===== Eliminated in primary =====
- Laura Jones, realtor

==== Primary results ====
2020 Texas's 8th congressional district Democratic primary results by county Hernandez: Hernandez—60–70%; Hernandez—50–60%; Jones: Jones—50–60%

Democratic primary results
Party	Candidate	Votes	%
Democratic	Elizabeth Hernandez	18,660	59.8
Democratic	Laura Jones	12,519	40.2
Total votes		31,179	100.0

=== General election ===
==== Predictions ====
Source	Ranking	As of
The Cook Political Report	Safe R	July 2, 2020
FiveThirtyEight	Solid R	October 13, 2020
Inside Elections	Safe R	June 2, 2020
Sabato's Crystal Ball	Safe R	July 2, 2020
Politico	Safe R	April 19, 2020
Daily Kos	Safe R	June 3, 2020
RCP	Safe R	June 9, 2020
270toWin	Safe R	June 7, 2020

==== Results ====
Texas's 8th congressional district, 2020
Party	Candidate	Votes	%
Republican	Kevin Brady (incumbent)	277,327	72.5
Democratic	Elizabeth Hernandez	97,409	25.5
Libertarian	Chris Duncan	7,735	2.0
Total votes		382,471	100.0
Republican hold			

== District 9 ==
2020 Texas's 9th congressional district election
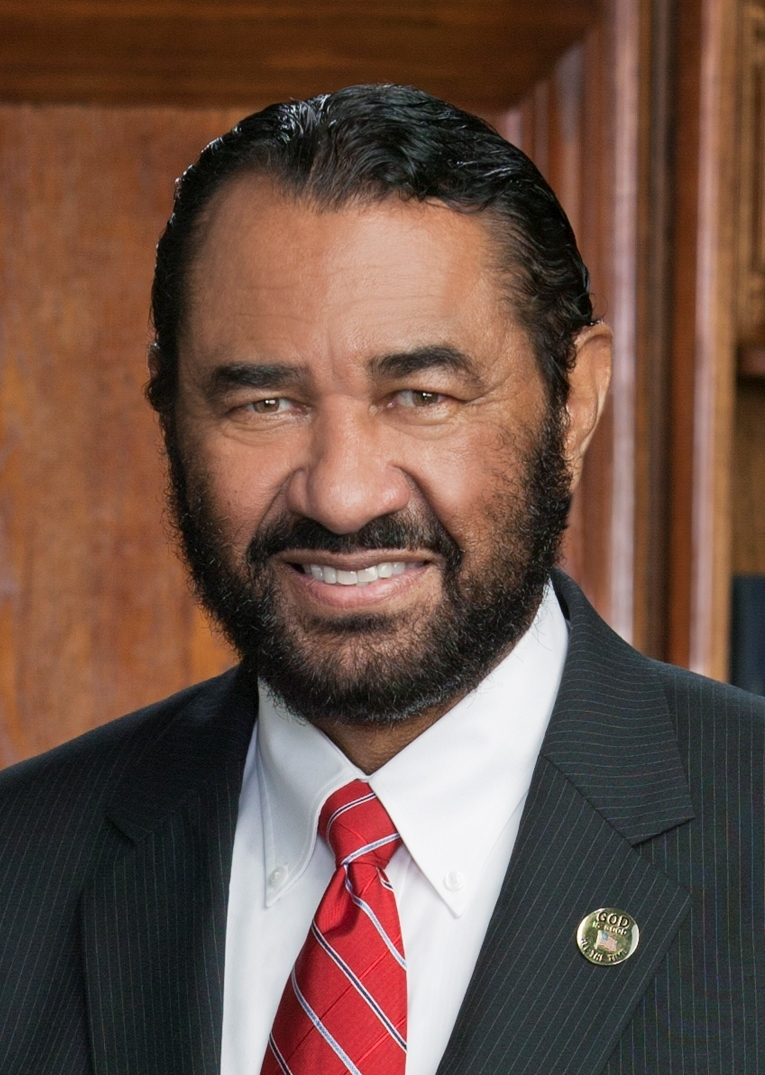

Nominee	Al Green	Johnny Teague
Party	Democratic	Republican
Popular vote	172,938	49,575
Percentage	75.5%	21.6%
U.S. Representative before election
Al Green
Democratic
Elected U.S. Representative
Al Green
Democratic

The 9th district encompasses southwestern Houston. The incumbent was Democrat Al Green, who was re-elected with 89.1% of the vote in 2018, without major-party opposition.

=== Democratic primary ===
==== Candidates ====
===== Nominee =====
- Al Green, incumbent U.S. representative

===== Eliminated in primary =====
- Melissa Wilson-Williams, real estate broker

==== Primary results ====
Democratic primary results
Party	Candidate	Votes	%
Democratic	Al Green (incumbent)	48,387	83.6
Democratic	Melissa Wilson-Williams	9,511	16.4
Total votes		57,898	100.0

=== Republican primary ===
==== Candidates ====
===== Nominee =====
- Johnny Teague, rancher

===== Eliminated in primary =====
- Julian Martinez, auto repairman
- Jon Menefee, IT consultant

==== Primary results ====
Republican primary results
Party	Candidate	Votes	%
Republican	Johnny Teague	6,149	58.7
Republican	Jon Menefee	2,519	24.0
Republican	Julian Martinez	1,809	17.3
Total votes		10,477	100.0

=== General election ===
==== Predictions ====
Source	Ranking	As of
The Cook Political Report	Safe D	July 2, 2020
FiveThirtyEight	Solid D	October 13, 2020
Inside Elections	Safe D	June 2, 2020
Sabato's Crystal Ball	Safe D	July 2, 2020
Politico	Safe D	April 19, 2020
Daily Kos	Safe D	June 3, 2020
RCP	Safe D	June 9, 2020
270toWin	Safe D	June 7, 2020

==== Results ====
Texas's 9th congressional district, 2020
Party	Candidate	Votes	%
Democratic	Al Green (incumbent)	172,938	75.5
Republican	Johnny Teague	49,575	21.6
Libertarian	Joe Sosa	6,594	2.9
Total votes		229,107	100.0
Democratic hold			

== District 10 ==
2020 Texas's 10th congressional district election
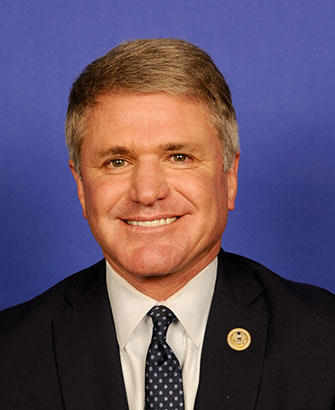

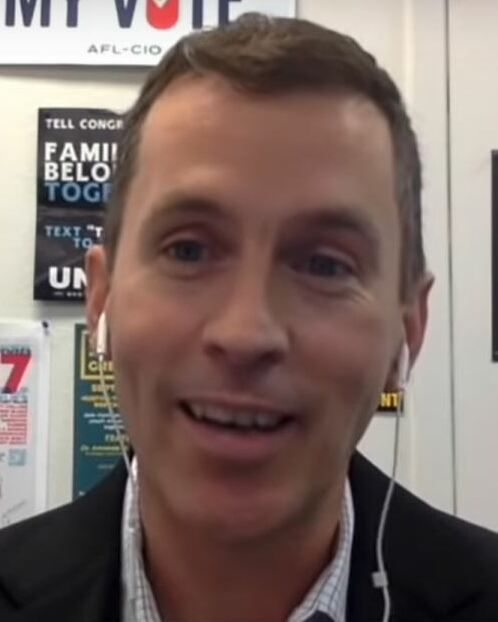
Nominee	Michael McCaul	Mike Siegel
Party	Republican	Democratic
Popular vote	217,216	187,686
Percentage	52.5%	45.3%
- County results McCaul: 50–60% 60–70% 70–80% 80–90% Siegel: 60–70%
U.S. Representative before election
Michael McCaul
Republican
Elected U.S. Representative
Michael McCaul
Republican

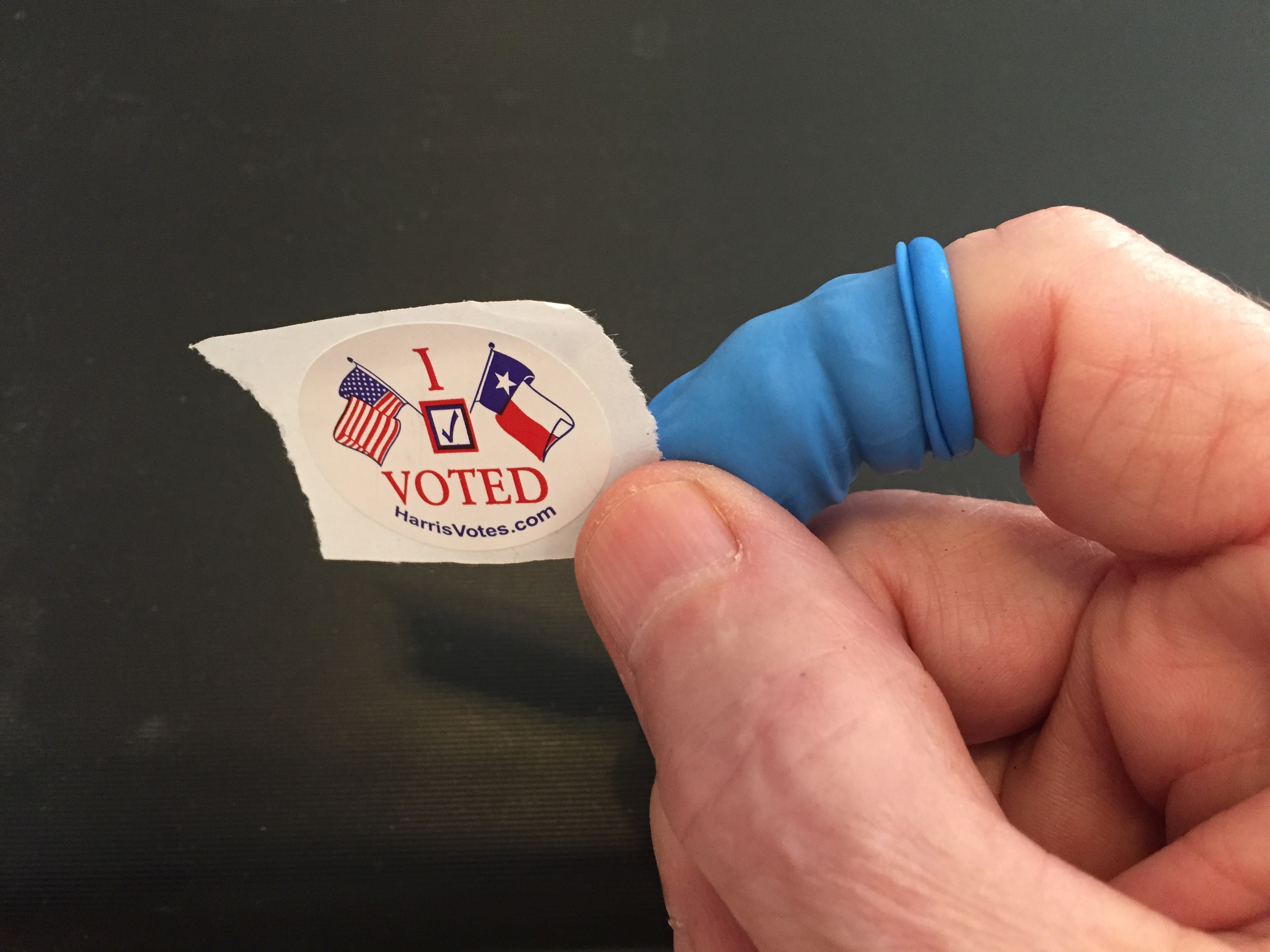
Early voter in Harris County, Texas

The 10th district stretches from northwest Harris County to northern Austin and Pflugerville. The incumbent was Republican Michael McCaul, who was re-elected in 2018 with 51.1% of the vote to Democrat Mike Siegel's 47.8%, the closest contest McCaul had faced.

=== Republican primary ===
==== Candidates ====
===== Nominee =====
- Michael McCaul, incumbent U.S. representative

==== Primary results ====
Republican primary results
Party	Candidate	Votes	%
Republican	Michael McCaul (incumbent)	60,323	100.0
Total votes		60,323	100.0

=== Democratic primary ===
==== Candidates ====
===== Nominee =====
- Mike Siegel, attorney and nominee for Texas's 10th congressional district in 2018

===== Eliminated in runoff =====
- Pritesh Gandhi, physician

===== Eliminated in primary =====
- Shannon Hutcheson, attorney

==== Endorsements ====
Mike Siegel

Federal officials

- Nick Lampson, former U.S. representative (TX-09) (1997–2005) (D-TX-22) (2007–2009)
- Ted Lieu, U.S. representative (CA-33)

State officials

- Gonzalo Barrientos, former state senator (1985–2007) and former state representative (1975–1985)
- Sheryl Cole, state representative
- Jim Hightower, former agriculture commissioner (1983–1991)
- Elliott Naishtat, former state representative (1991–2017)
- Erin Zwiener, state representative

Labor unions

- AFL-CIO
- AFSCME Local 1624
- Communications Workers of America
- International Brotherhood of Electrical Workers
- National Union of Healthcare Workers
- Texas AFL-CIO

Newspapers

- Austin Chronicle
- Daily Texan
- Houston Chronicle

Organizations

- 350 Action
- Blue America
- Brand New Congress
- Clean Water Action
- Democracy for America
- Environment America
- Our Revolution
- People for the American Way
- Progressive Democrats of America
- Sierra Club
- Stonewall Democrats of Austin
- Sunrise Movement
- Working Families Party

Individuals

- Jamaal Bowman, 2020 Democratic nominee for New York's 16th congressional district
- Justin Nelson, 2018 Democratic nominee for Texas Attorney General
- Kim Olson, 2020 Democratic candidate in TX-24 and 2018 Democratic nominee for Texas Commissioner of Agriculture
- Barbara Radnofsky, Democratic nominee in the 2006 United States Senate election in Texas
Pritesh Gandhi

Federal officials

- Kamala Harris, U.S. senator from California and 2020 Democratic presidential candidate

Newspapers

- Austin Statesman

Organizations

- 314 Action
- ASPIRE PAC
- Giffords
Shannon Hutcheson (eliminated)

Organizations

- EMILY's List
- NARAL Pro-Choice America

==== Primary results ====
Democratic primary results
Party	Candidate	Votes	%
Democratic	Mike Siegel	35,651	44.0
Democratic	Pritesh Gandhi	26,818	33.1
Democratic	Shannon Hutcheson	18,578	22.9
Total votes		81,047	100.0

==== Runoff results ====
Democratic primary runoff results
Party	Candidate	Votes	%
Democratic	Mike Siegel	26,799	54.2
Democratic	Pritesh Gandhi	22,629	45.8
Total votes		49,428	100.0

=== General election ===
==== Post-primary endorsements ====
Michael McCaul (R)

Organizations

- Campaign for Working Families
- National Right to Life Committee
- NRA Political Victory Fund
- Texas Alliance for Life

Newspapers and publications

- Austin American-Statesman
Mike Siegel (D)

U.S. senators

- Bernie Sanders, U.S. senator (I-VT)
- Elizabeth Warren, U.S. senator (D-MA)

U.S. representatives

- André Carson, U.S. representative (IN-07)
- Veronica Escobar, U.S. representative (TX-16)
- Sylvia Garcia, U.S. representative (TX-29)
- Pramila Jayapal, U.S. representative (WA-07)
- Ro Khanna, U.S. representative (CA-17)
- Alexandria Ocasio-Cortez, U.S. representative (NY-14)
- Beto O'Rourke, former U.S. representative (TX-16)

==== Polling ====
Poll source	Date(s) administered	Sample size	Margin of error	Michael McCaul (R)	Mike Siegel (D)	Roy Eriksen (L)	Undecided
GBAO Strategies (D) (Note: Poll sponsored by Siegel's campaign.)	October 8–11, 2020	400 (LV)	± 4.9%	47%	45%	–	–
GBAO Strategies (D)	September 21–24, 2020	400 (LV)	± 4.9%	45%	43%	6%	–
RMG Research	July 28 – August 3, 2020	500 (RV)	± 4.5%	46%	39%	–	15%

Hypothetical polling

with Shannon Hutcheson

Poll source	Date(s) administered	Sample size	Margin of error	Michael McCaul (R)	Shannon Hutcheson (D)	Undecided
Remington Research (R)	November 6–7, 2019	848 (LV)	± 3.4%	50%	41%	9%

with Generic Democrat and Generic Republican

Poll source	Date(s) administered	Sample size	Margin of error	Generic Republican	Generic Democrat	Undecided
Public Policy Polling (D) (Note: Poll sponsored by House Majority Forward, a non-profit arm of the Democratic-supporting House Majority PAC.)	September 19–21, 2019	523 (LV) – 656 (LV)	± 3.8% – ± 4.2%	49%	46%	–

==== Predictions ====
Source	Ranking	As of
The Cook Political Report	Tossup	November 2, 2020
FiveThirtyEight	Likely R	November 2, 2020
Inside Elections	Lean R	November 2, 2020
Sabato's Crystal Ball	Lean R	November 2, 2020
Politico	Lean R	November 2, 2020
Daily Kos	Lean R	November 2, 2020
RCP	Tossup	November 2, 2020
270toWin	Lean R	November 2, 2020

==== Results ====
Texas's 10th congressional district, 2020
Party	Candidate	Votes	%
Republican	Michael McCaul (incumbent)	217,216	52.5
Democratic	Mike Siegel	187,686	45.3
Libertarian	Roy Eriksen	8,992	2.2
Total votes		413,894	100.0
Republican hold			

== District 11 ==
2020 Texas's 11th congressional district election
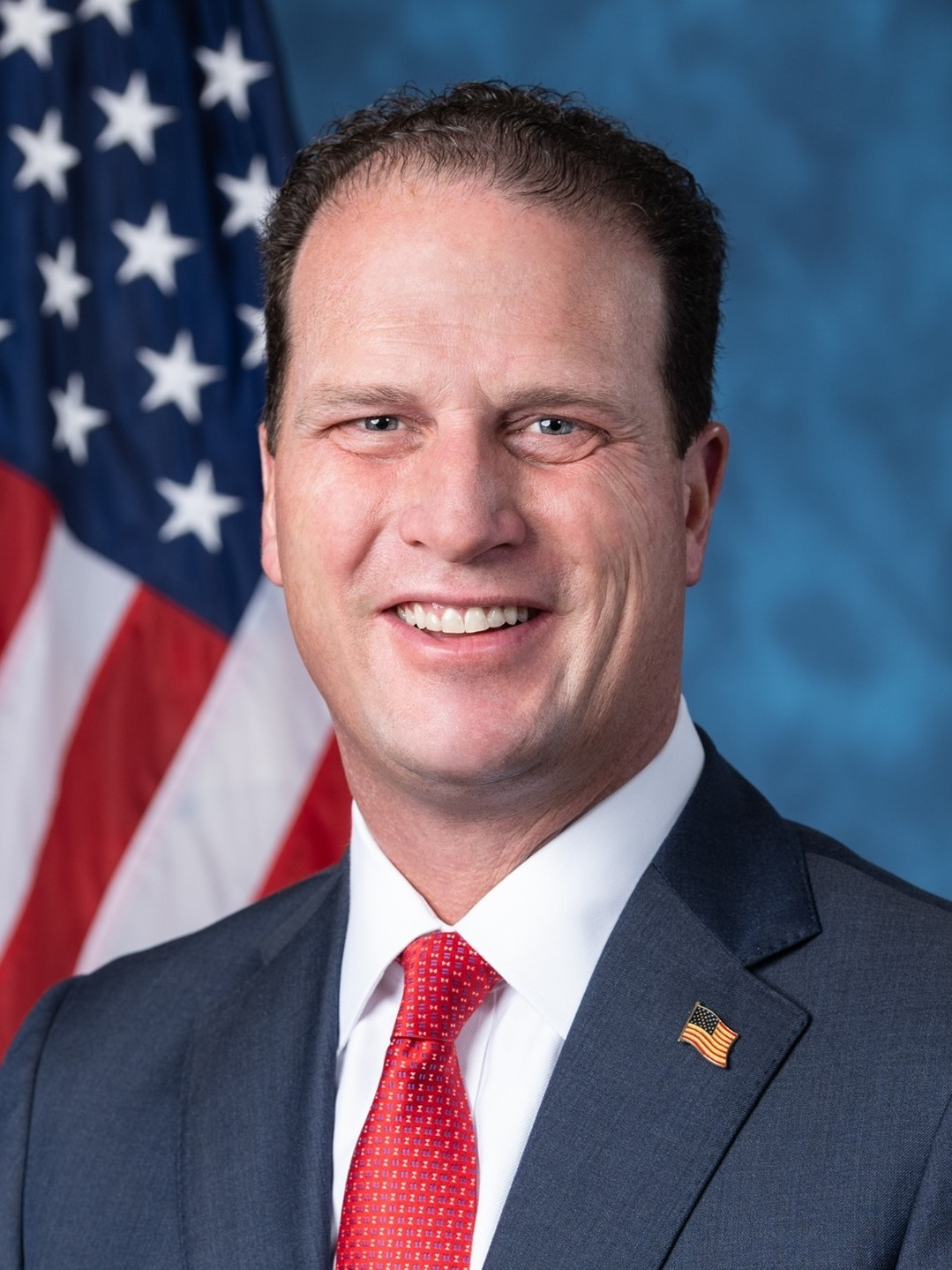

Nominee	August Pfluger	Jon Mark Hogg
Party	Republican	Democratic
Popular vote	232,568	53,394
Percentage	79.7%	18.3%
U.S. Representative before election
Mike Conaway
Republican
Elected U.S. Representative
August Pfluger
Republican

The 11th district is based in midwestern Texas, including Lamesa, Midland, Odessa, San Angelo, Granbury, and Brownwood. The incumbent was Republican Mike Conaway, who was re-elected with 80.1% of the vote in 2018, subsequently announced he would not seek re-election on July 31, 2019.

=== Republican primary ===
==== Candidates ====
===== Nominee =====
- August Pfluger, former national security advisor to President Donald Trump and U.S. Air Force veteran

===== Eliminated in primary =====
- Gene Barber, U.S. Army veteran
- Brandon Batch, businessman
- Jamie Berryhill, businessman and founder of Mission Messiah Women & Children's Program
- Cynthia J. Breyman, banker
- J.D. Faircloth, former mayor of Midland
- Casey Gray, U.S. Navy veteran
- J. Ross Lacy, Midland city councilman
- Ned Luscombe, registered nurse
- Robert Tucker, retiree
- Wesley Virdell, Air Force veteran, former trucking company owner

===== Declined =====
- Richard Barrett, physician
- Mike Conaway, incumbent U.S. representative
- Brooks Landgraf, state representative
- Mike Lang, state representative
- Jerry Morales, mayor of Midland

==== Primary results ====
Republican primary results
Party	Candidate	Votes	%
Republican	August Pfluger	56,093	52.2
Republican	Brandon Batch	16,224	15.1
Republican	Wesley W. Virdell	7,672	7.1
Republican	Jamie Berryhill	7,496	7.0
Republican	J. Ross Lacy	4,785	4.4
Republican	J.D. Faircloth	4,257	4.0
Republican	Casey Gray	4,064	3.8
Republican	Robert Tucker	3,137	2.9
Republican	Ned Luscombe	2,066	1.9
Republican	Gene Barber	1,641	1.5
Total votes		107,435	100.0

=== Democratic primary ===
==== Candidates ====
===== Nominee =====
- Jon Mark Hogg, lawyer

Democratic primary results
Party	Candidate	Votes	%
Democratic	Jon Mark Hogg	16,644	100.0
Total votes		16,644	100.0

=== Third parties ===
==== Candidates ====
===== Declared =====
- Wacey Alpha Cody (Libertarian), competitive horse rider

=== Endorsements ===
August Pfluger (R)

U.S. presidents

- Donald Trump, 45th president of the United States (2017–2021)

U.S. federal executive officials

- Donald Evans, former Secretary of Commerce (2001–2005)

U.S. senators

- Tom Cotton, U.S. senator from Arkansas (2015–present)

U.S. representatives

- Dan Crenshaw, U.S. representative from TX-02 (2019–present)

State and local officials

- Drew Darby, Texas state representative from District 72 (2007–present)
- Andrew Murr, Texas state representative from District 53 (2015–present)
- Charles Perry, Texas state senator from District 28 (2014–present)

Organizations

- Republican National Hispanic Assembly
- Texas and Southwestern Cattle Raisers Association
- Texas Farm Bureau

=== General election ===
==== Predictions ====
Source	Ranking	As of
The Cook Political Report	Safe R	July 2, 2020
FiveThirtyEight	Solid R	October 13, 2020
Inside Elections	Safe R	June 2, 2020
Sabato's Crystal Ball	Safe R	July 2, 2020
Politico	Safe R	April 19, 2020
Daily Kos	Safe R	June 3, 2020
RCP	Safe R	June 9, 2020
270toWin	Safe R	June 7, 2020

==== Results ====
Texas's 11th congressional district, 2020
Party	Candidate	Votes	%
Republican	August Pfluger	232,568	79.7
Democratic	Jon Mark Hogg	53,394	18.3
Libertarian	Wacey Alpha Cody	5,811	2.0
Total votes		291,773	100.0
Republican hold			

== District 12 ==
2020 Texas's 12th congressional district election
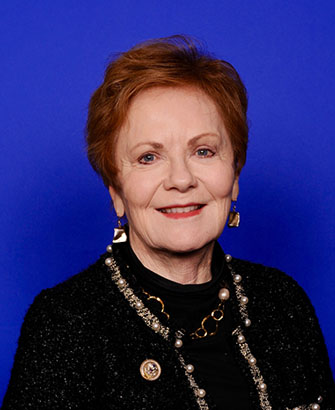

Nominee	Kay Granger	Lisa Welch
Party	Republican	Democratic
Popular vote	233,853	121,250
Percentage	63.7%	33.0%
U.S. Representative before election
Kay Granger
Republican
Elected U.S. Representative
Kay Granger
Republican

The 12th district is located in the Dallas–Fort Worth metroplex, and takes in Parker County and western Tarrant County, including parts of Fort Worth and its inner suburbs of North Richland Hills, Saginaw, and Haltom City. The incumbent was Republican Kay Granger, who was re-elected with 64.3% of the vote in 2018.

=== Republican primary ===
==== Candidates ====
===== Nominee =====
- Kay Granger, incumbent U.S. representative

===== Eliminated in primary =====
- Chris Putnam, businessman and former Colleyville city councilman

===== Endorsements =====
Chris Putnam

Organizations

- Club for Growth

===== Polling =====
Poll source	Date(s) administered	Sample size	Margin of error	Kay Granger	Chris Putnam	Undecided
Remington Research Group (R)	December 17–18, 2019	686 (LV)	± 3.7%	62%	16%	22%

==== Primary results ====
Republican primary results
Party	Candidate	Votes	%
Republican	Kay Granger (incumbent)	43,240	58.0
Republican	Chris Putnam	31,420	42.0
Total votes		74,840	100.0

=== Democratic primary ===
==== Candidates ====
===== Nominee =====
- Lisa Welch, college professor

===== Eliminated in primary =====
- Danny Anderson, aircraft assembler

==== Primary results ====
Democratic primary results
Party	Candidate	Votes	%
Democratic	Lisa Welch	36,750	81.1
Democratic	Danny Anderson	8,588	18.9
Total votes		45,338	100.0

=== Third parties ===
==== Candidates ====
===== Declared =====
- Trey Holcomb (Libertarian), conservative activist, educator and former high school football and baseball coach

=== Endorsements ===
Kay Granger (R)

U.S. presidents

- Donald Trump, president of the United States

Organizations

- Maggie's List
- Susan B. Anthony List
Lisa Welch (D)

Labor unions

- Texas AFL-CIO

=== General election ===
==== Predictions ====
Source	Ranking	As of
The Cook Political Report	Safe R	July 2, 2020
FiveThirtyEight	Solid R	October 13, 2020
Inside Elections	Safe R	June 2, 2020
Sabato's Crystal Ball	Safe R	July 2, 2020
Politico	Safe R	April 19, 2020
Daily Kos	Safe R	June 3, 2020
RCP	Safe R	June 9, 2020
270toWin	Safe R	June 7, 2020

==== Results ====
Texas's 12th congressional district, 2020
Party	Candidate	Votes	%
Republican	Kay Granger (incumbent)	233,853	63.7
Democratic	Lisa Welch	121,250	33.0
Libertarian	Trey Holcomb	11,918	3.3
Total votes		367,021	100.0
Republican hold			

== District 13 ==
2020 Texas's 13th congressional district election
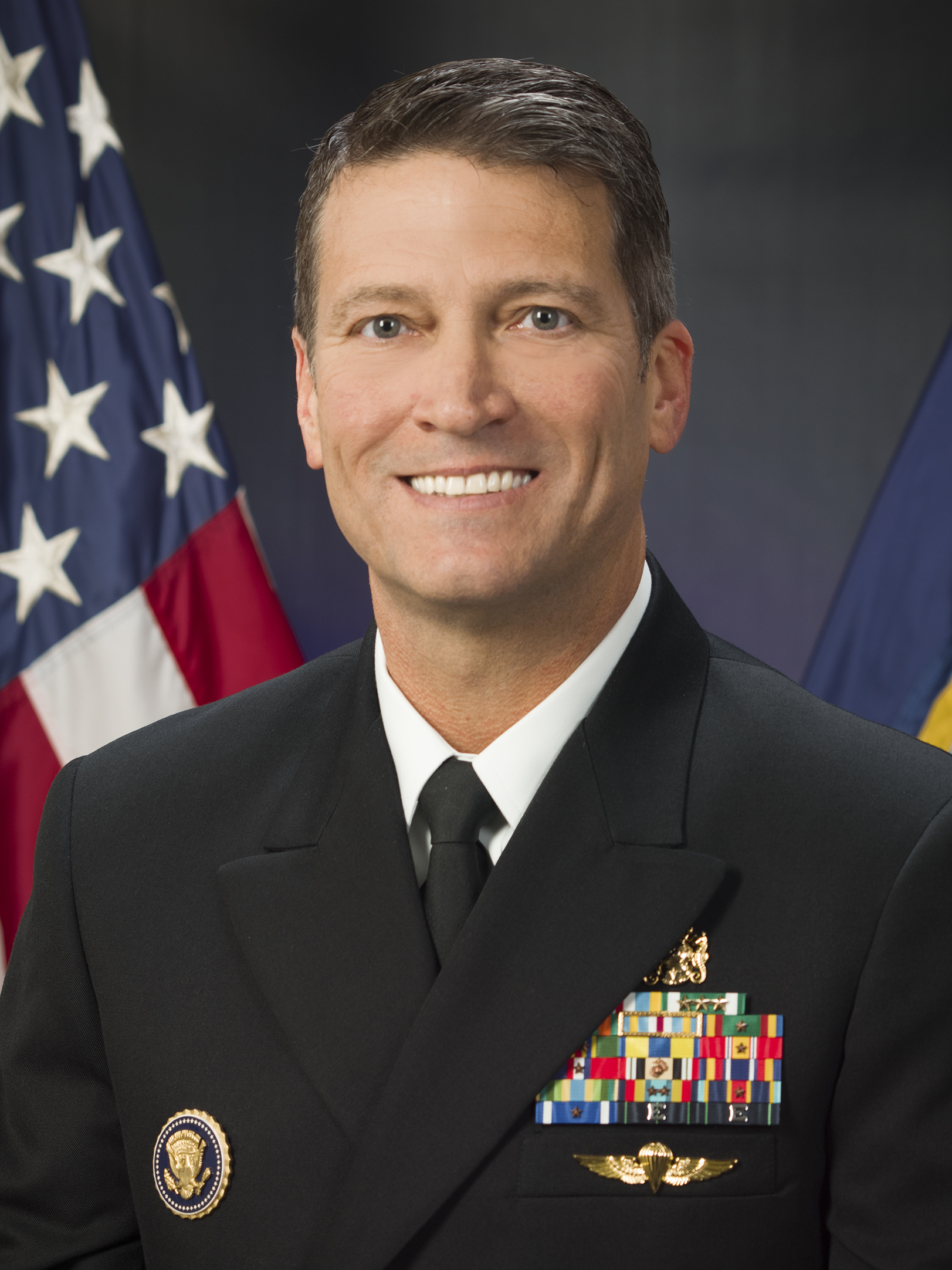

Nominee	Ronny Jackson	Gus Trujillo
Party	Republican	Democratic
Popular vote	217,124	50,477
Percentage	79.4%	18.5%
U.S. Representative before election
Mac Thornberry
Republican
Elected U.S. Representative
Ronny Jackson
Republican

The 13th district encompasses most of the Texas Panhandle, containing the cities of Amarillo, Gainesville and Wichita Falls. The incumbent was Republican Mac Thornberry, who was re-elected with 81.5% of the vote in 2018. On September 30, 2019, Thornberry announced he would not seek re-election.

=== Republican primary ===
==== Candidates ====
===== Nominee =====
- Ronny Jackson, retired Navy rear admiral, former Physician to the President, and former nominee for Secretary of Veterans Affairs

===== Eliminated in runoff =====
- Josh Winegarner, director of governmental relations for the Texas Cattle Feeders Association and former aide to U.S. Senator John Cornyn and former U.S. Senator Phil Gramm

===== Eliminated in primary =====
- Catherine "I Swear" Carr, education-counseling artist
- Jamie Culley, business consultant
- Chris Ekstrom, businessman and activist
- Jason Foglesong, Potter County Republican precinct chairman
- Lee Harvey, Wichita County commissioner
- Elaine Hays, Amarillo city councilwoman and candidate for Texas's 13th congressional district in 2014
- Richard Herman, former Potter County justice of the peace
- Diane Knowlton, attorney
- Matt McArthur, construction manager
- Mark Neese, educator
- Asusena Resendiz, former president and CEO of the Fort Worth Hispanic Chamber of Commerce
- Vance Snider II, U.S. Army veteran and railroad conductor
- Monique Worthy, activist

===== Withdrew =====
- Kevin McInturff, non-profit worker

===== Declined =====
- Pam Barlow, veterinarian and candidate for Texas's 13th congressional district in 2012 and 2014
- Jason Brinkley, Cooke County judge
- Ginger Nelson, mayor of Amarillo
- Four Price, state representative (running for re-election to Texas House)
- Trey Sralla, former Wichita Falls school board president
- Mac Thornberry, incumbent U.S. representative

==== Endorsements ====
Chris Ekstrom (eliminated)

Organizations

- Club for Growth
- Texas Right to Life PAC
Elaine Hays (eliminated)

Organizations

- Maggie's List
Ronny Jackson

Federal officials

- Don Bacon, U.S. representative (NE-02)
- Lindsey Graham, U.S. senator from South Carolina and former U.S. Representative (SC-03) (1995–2003)
- Josh Hawley, U.S. senator from Missouri
- Darrell Issa, former U.S. representative (CA-49) (2001–2019)
- Jeff Miller, former U.S. representative (FL-01) (2001–2017)
- Rick Perry, former U.S. Secretary of Energy (2017–2019); governor (2000–2015), lieutenant governor (1999–2000), and Agriculture Commissioner of Texas (1991–1999)
- Steve Stivers, U.S. representative (OH-15)
- Brad Wenstrup, U.S. representative (OH-02)

State officials

- Sid Miller, state agriculture commissioner and former state representative (2001–2013)

Organizations

- American Conservative Union
- Club for Growth (originally endorsed Chris Ekstrom)
- Eagle Forum PAC
- Gun Owners of America
- Texas Right to Life PAC (originally endorsed Chris Ekstrom)

Individuals

- Donald Trump Jr., son of Donald Trump
Josh Winegarner

Federal officials

- Mike Conaway, U.S. representative (TX-11)
- Lance Gooden, U.S. representative (TX-05)
- Phil Gramm, former U.S. senator from Texas (1985–2002)
- Kenny Marchant, U.S. representative (TX-24)
- Mac Thornberry, U.S. representative (TX-13)

State officials

- Warren Chisum, former state representative (1989–2013)
- Robert L. Duncan, former state senator (1997–2014) and state representative (1989–1993)
- Charles Perry, state senator and former state representative (2011–2014)
- Kel Seliger, state senator

Organizations

- Texas Alliance for Life

Individuals

- Tom Mechler, former Republican Party of Texas chair (2015–2017)

==== Primary results ====
2020 Texas's 13th congressional district Republican primary results by county Winegarner: Winegarner—70–80%; Winegarner—60–70%; Winegarner—50–60%; Winegarner—40–50%; Winegarner—30–40%; Winegarner—<30%; Hays: Hays—<30%; Neese: Neese—<30%; Harvey: Harvey—40–50%

Republican primary results
Party	Candidate	Votes	%
Republican	Josh Winegarner	39,130	39.0
Republican	Ronny Jackson	20,048	20.0
Republican	Chris Ekstrom	15,387	15.3
Republican	Elaine Hays	7,701	7.7
Republican	Lee Harvey	3,841	3.8
Republican	Vance Snider II	3,506	3.5
Republican	Mark Neese	2,984	3.0
Republican	Matt McArthur	1,816	1.8
Republican	Diane Knowlton	1,464	1.5
Republican	Richard Herman	915	0.9
Republican	Asusena Reséndiz	818	0.8
Republican	Jamie Culley	779	0.8
Republican	Monique Worthy	748	0.7
Republican	Catherine "I Swear" Carr	707	0.7
Republican	Jason Foglesong	579	0.6
Total votes		100,423	100.0

==== Polling ====
Poll source	Date(s) administered	Sample size	Margin of error	Ronny Jackson	Josh Winegarner	Undecided
Fabrizio, Lee & Associates (R) (Note: The Miles of Greatness Fund supports Jackson's candidacy)	June 27–28, 2020	400 (LV)	± 4.9%	46%	29%	–
WPA Intelligence (R) (Note: The Club for Growth had endorsed Ronny Jackson prior to the sampling period of this poll)	June 17–18, 2020	408 (LV)	± 4.9%	49%	41%	10%
WPA Intelligence (R)	May 11–12, 2020	– (V) (Note: Not yet released)	–	36%	47%	17%

==== Runoff results ====
Republican primary runoff results
Party	Candidate	Votes	%
Republican	Ronny Jackson	36,684	55.6
Republican	Josh Winegarner	29,327	44.4
Total votes		66,011	100.0

=== Democratic primary ===
==== Candidates ====
===== Nominee =====
- Gus Trujillo, office manager

===== Eliminated in runoff =====
- Greg Sagan, U.S. Navy veteran and nominee for Texas's 13th congressional district in 2018

===== Eliminated in primary =====
- Timothy W. Gassaway, retiree

==== Primary results ====
2020 Texas's 13th congressional district Democratic primary initial round results by county Trujillo: Trujillo—60–70%; Trujillo—50–60%; Trujillo—40–50%; Trujillo—30–40%; Tie: Trujillo/Sagan tie—30–40%; Trujillo/Sagan tie—40–50%; Trujillo/Sagan tie—50–60%; Trujillo/Gassaway tie—40–50%; Sagan: Sagan—30–40%; Sagan—40–50%; Sagan—60–70%; Gassaway: Gassaway—30–40%

Democratic primary results
Party	Candidate	Votes	%
Democratic	Gus Trujillo	6,998	42.1
Democratic	Greg Sagan	5,773	34.7
Democratic	Timothy W. Gassaway	3,854	23.2
Total votes		16,625	100.0

==== Runoff results ====
Greg Sagan withdrew from the race on March 12, 2020, but remained on the ballot in the runoff.

Democratic primary runoff results
Party	Candidate	Votes	%
Democratic	Gus Trujillo	4,988	66.4
Democratic	Greg Sagan	2,529	33.6
Total votes		7,517	100.0

=== Libertarian primary ===
==== Candidates ====
===== Declared =====
- Jack B. Westbrook, retiree and nominee for Texas's 31st state senate district in 2018

=== General election ===
==== Predictions ====
Source	Ranking	As of
The Cook Political Report	Safe R	July 2, 2020
FiveThirtyEight	Solid R	October 13, 2020
Inside Elections	Safe R	June 2, 2020
Sabato's Crystal Ball	Safe R	July 2, 2020
Politico	Safe R	April 19, 2020
Daily Kos	Safe R	June 3, 2020
RCP	Safe R	June 9, 2020
270toWin	Safe R	June 7, 2020

==== Results ====
Texas's 13th congressional district, 2020
Party	Candidate	Votes	%
Republican	Ronny Jackson	217,124	79.4
Democratic	Gus Trujillo	50,477	18.5
Libertarian	Jack B. Westbrook	5,907	2.1
Total votes		273,508	100.0
Republican hold			

== District 14 ==
2020 Texas's 14th congressional district election
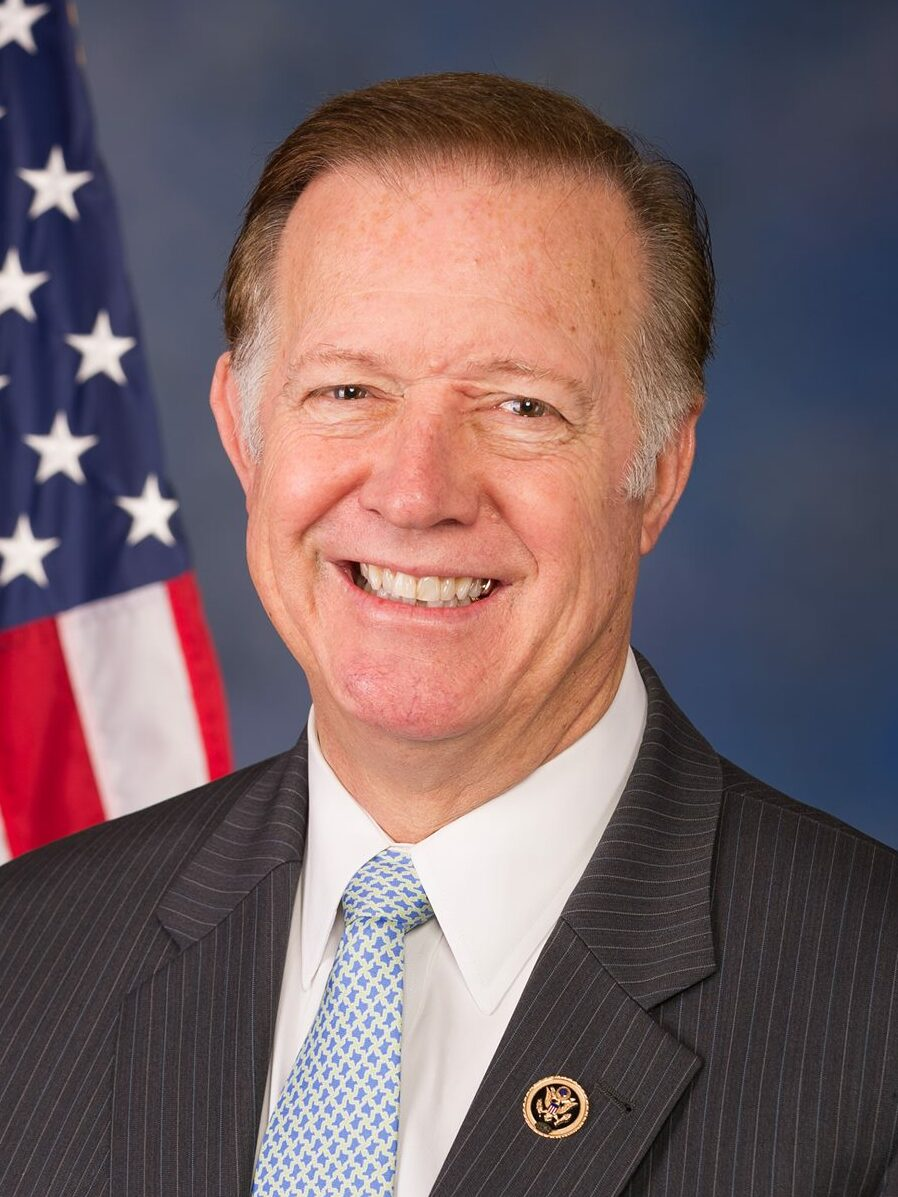

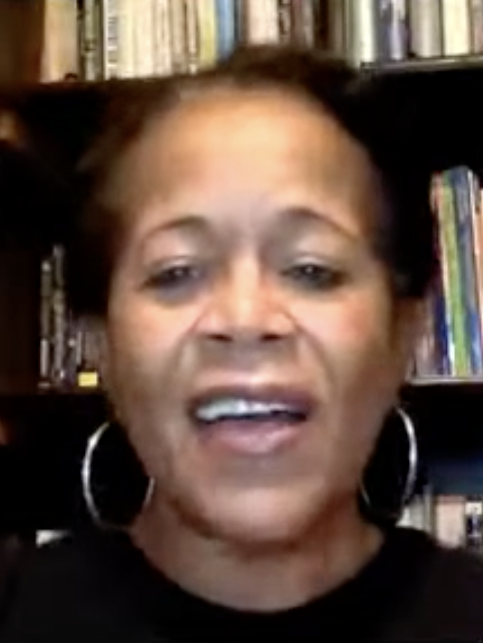
Nominee	Randy Weber	Adrienne Bell
Party	Republican	Democratic
Popular vote	190,541	118,574
Percentage	61.6%	38.4%
- County results Weber: 50–60% 60–70% 70–80%
U.S. Representative before election
Randy Weber
Republican
Elected U.S. Representative
Randy Weber
Republican

The 14th district takes in the southern and southeastern region of Greater Houston, including Galveston, Jefferson County and southern Brazoria County. The incumbent was Republican Randy Weber, who was re-elected with 59.2% of the vote in 2018.

=== Republican primary ===
==== Candidates ====
===== Nominee =====
- Randy Weber, incumbent U.S. representative

===== Eliminated in primary =====
- Joshua Foxworth, businessman

==== Primary results ====
Republican primary results
Party	Candidate	Votes	%
Republican	Randy Weber (incumbent)	51,837	85.4
Republican	Joshua Foxworth	8,856	14.6
Total votes		60,693	100.0

=== Democratic primary ===
==== Candidates ====
===== Nominee =====
- Adrienne Bell, nominee for Texas's 14th congressional district in 2018

===== Eliminated in primary =====
- Sanjanetta Barnes
- Eddie Fisher
- Robert Thomas, West Columbia city councilman
- Mikal Williams, attorney

==== Primary results ====
Democratic primary results
Party	Candidate	Votes	%
Democratic	Adrienne Bell	26,152	61.8
Democratic	Eddie Fisher	4,967	11.7
Democratic	Sanjanetta Barnes	4,482	10.6
Democratic	Mikal Williams	4,055	9.6
Democratic	Robert Thomas	2,640	6.2
Total votes		42,296	100.0

=== General election ===
==== Endorsements ====
Adrienne Bell (D)

U.S. presidents

- Barack Obama, 44th president of the United States

Organizations

- #VOTEPROCHOICE
- Brand New Congress
- Democracy for America

==== Predictions ====
Source	Ranking	As of
The Cook Political Report	Safe R	July 2, 2020
FiveThirtyEight	Solid R	October 13, 2020
Inside Elections	Safe R	June 2, 2020
Sabato's Crystal Ball	Safe R	July 2, 2020
Politico	Safe R	April 19, 2020
Daily Kos	Safe R	June 3, 2020
RCP	Safe R	June 9, 2020
270toWin	Safe R	June 7, 2020

==== Results ====
Texas's 14th congressional district, 2020
Party	Candidate	Votes	%
Republican	Randy Weber (incumbent)	190,541	61.6
Democratic	Adrienne Bell	118,574	38.4
Total votes		309,115	100.0
Republican hold			

== District 15 ==
2020 Texas's 15th congressional district election
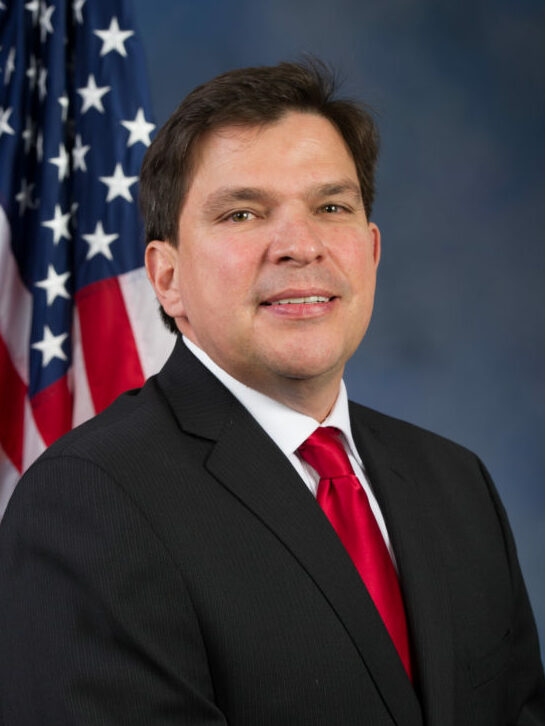

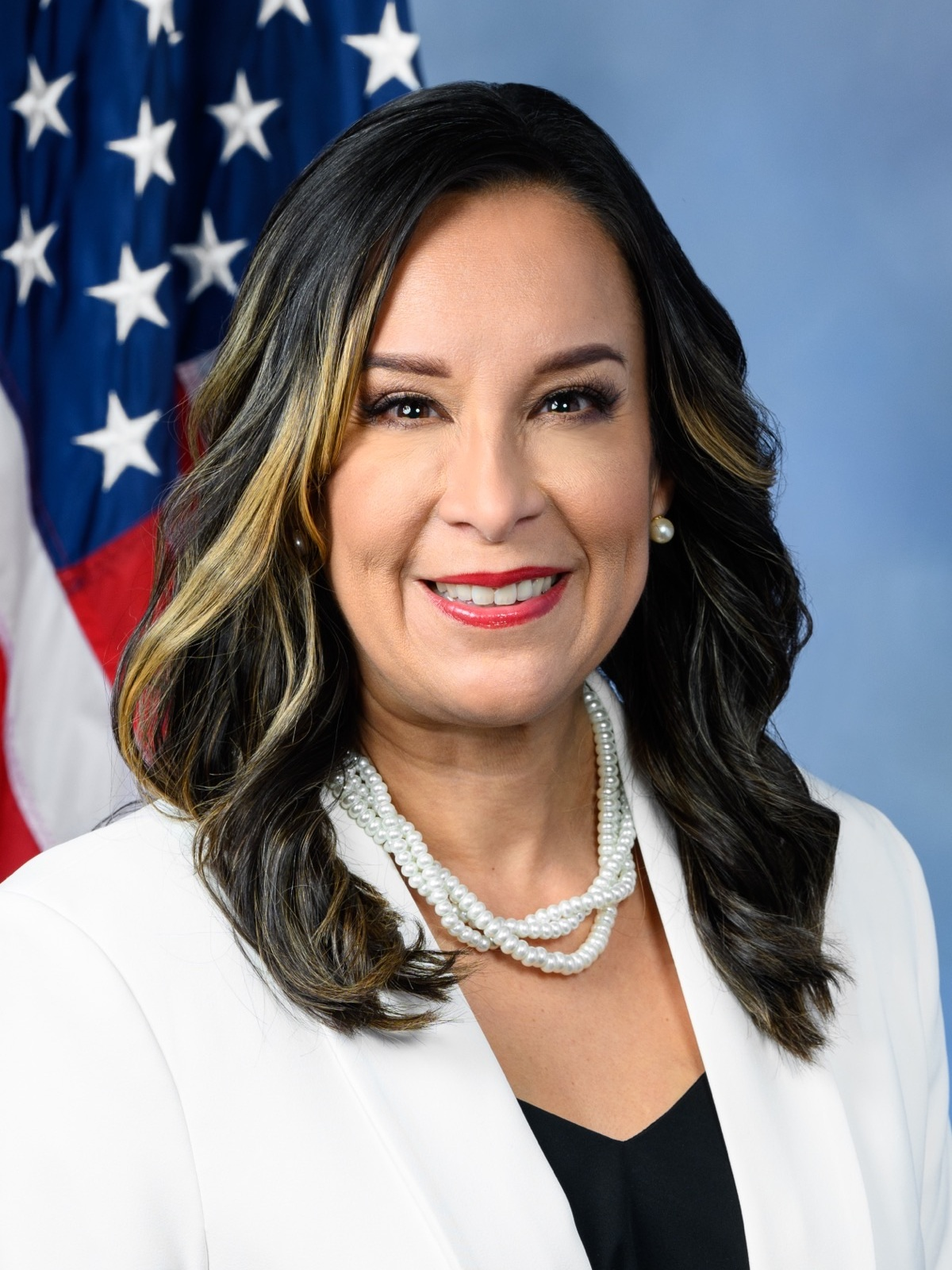
Nominee	Vicente Gonzalez	Monica De La Cruz
Party	Democratic	Republican
Popular vote	115,605	109,017
Percentage	50.5%	47.6%
- County results Gonzalez: 50–60% 60–70% 70–80% De La Cruz: 60–70% 70–80% 80–90%
U.S. Representative before election
Vicente Gonzalez
Democratic
Elected U.S. Representative
Vicente Gonzalez
Democratic

The 15th district stretches from McAllen in the Rio Grande Valley, northward into rural counties in the Greater San Antonio area. The incumbent was Democrat Vicente Gonzalez, who was re-elected with 59.7% of the vote in 2018.

=== Democratic primary ===
==== Candidates ====
===== Nominee =====
- Vicente Gonzalez, incumbent U.S. representative

==== Primary results ====
Democratic primary results
Party	Candidate	Votes	%
Democratic	Vicente Gonzalez (incumbent)	44,444	100.0
Total votes		44,444	100.0

=== Republican primary ===
==== Candidates ====
===== Nominee =====
- Monica de la Cruz-Hernandez, insurance agent

===== Eliminated in runoff =====
- Ryan Krause, candidate for Texas's 21st congressional district in 2018

===== Eliminated in primary =====
- Tim Westley, university instructor and nominee for Texas's 15th congressional district in 2016 and 2018

==== Primary results ====
Republican primary results
Party	Candidate	Votes	%
Republican	Monica De La Cruz	11,338	43.1
Republican	Ryan Krause	10,452	39.7
Republican	Tim Westley	4,539	17.2
Total votes		26,329	100.0

==== Runoff results ====
Republican primary runoff results
Party	Candidate	Votes	%
Republican	Monica De La Cruz	7,423	76.0
Republican	Ryan Krause	2,350	24.0
Total votes		9,773	100.0

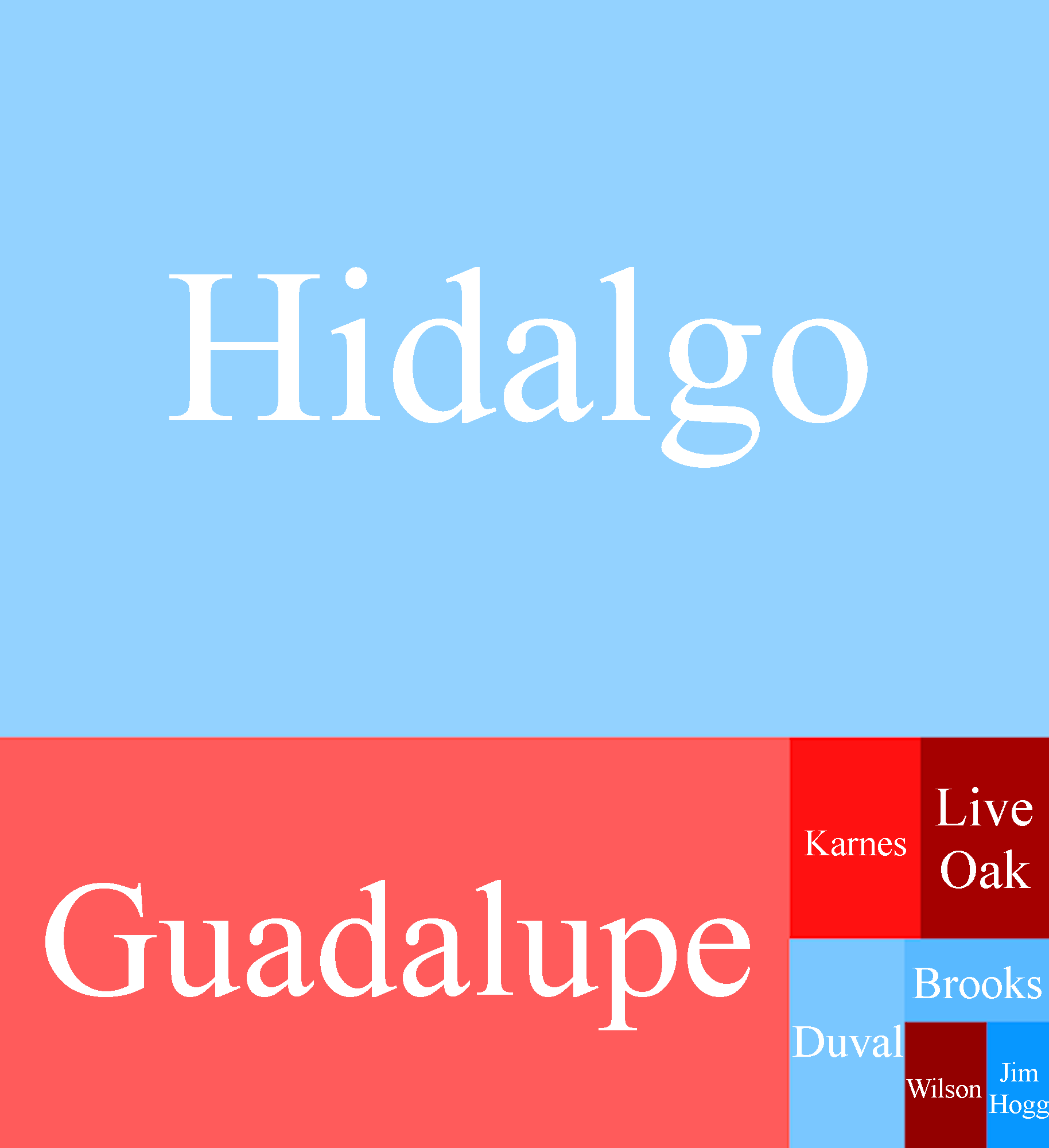
Cartogram of Texas' 15th congressional district

=== General election ===
==== Predictions ====
Source	Ranking	As of
The Cook Political Report	Safe D	July 2, 2020
FiveThirtyEight	Solid D	October 13, 2020
Inside Elections	Safe D	June 2, 2020
Sabato's Crystal Ball	Safe D	July 2, 2020
Politico	Safe D	April 19, 2020
Daily Kos	Safe D	June 3, 2020
RCP	Safe D	June 9, 2020
270toWin	Safe D	June 7, 2020

==== Results ====
Texas's 15th congressional district, 2020
Party	Candidate	Votes	%
Democratic	Vicente Gonzalez (incumbent)	115,605	50.5
Republican	Monica De La Cruz	109,017	47.6
Libertarian	Ross Lynn Leone	4,295	1.9
Total votes		228,917	100.0
Democratic hold			

== District 16 ==
2020 Texas's 16th congressional district election
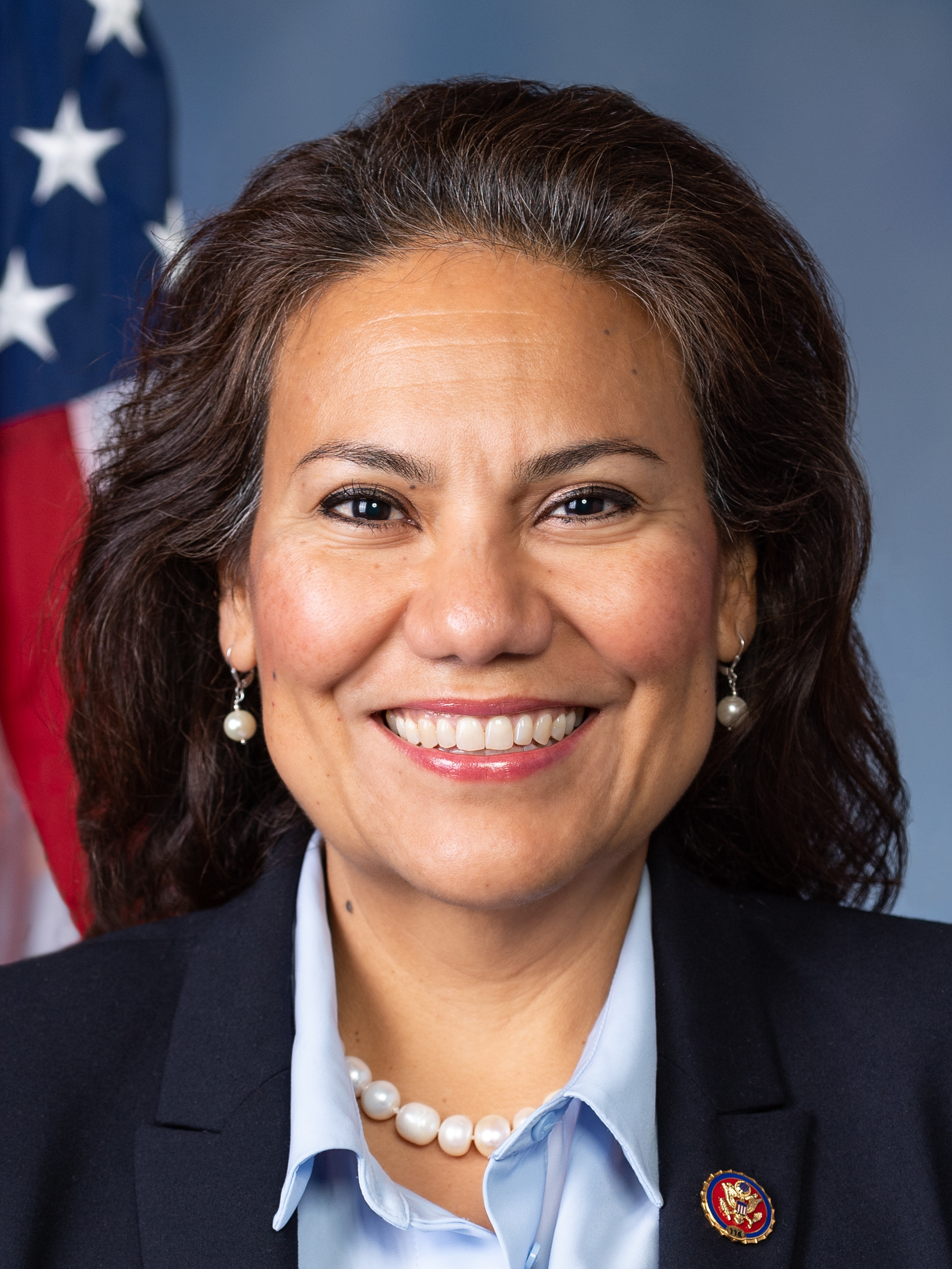

Nominee	Veronica Escobar	Irene Armendariz-Jackson
Party	Democratic	Republican
Popular vote	154,108	84,006
Percentage	64.7%	35.3%
- Escobar: 50–60% 60–70% 70–80% 80–90% >90% Armendariz-Jackson: 50–60% >90%
U.S. Representative before election
Veronica Escobar
Democratic
Elected U.S. Representative
Veronica Escobar
Democratic

The 16th district is located entirely within El Paso County, taking in El Paso, Horizon City, and Anthony. The incumbent was Democrat Veronica Escobar, who was elected with 68.5% of the vote in 2018.

=== Democratic primary ===
==== Candidates ====
===== Nominee =====
- Veronica Escobar, incumbent U.S. representative

==== Primary results ====
Democratic primary results
Party	Candidate	Votes	%
Democratic	Veronica Escobar (incumbent)	54,910	100.0
Total votes		54,910	100.0

=== Republican primary ===
==== Candidates ====
===== Nominee =====
- Irene Armendariz-Jackson, realtor

===== Eliminated in runoff =====
- Samuel Williams, U.S. Army veteran

===== Eliminated in primary =====
- Anthony Aguero, videographer
- Jaime Arriola Jr., nurse
- Patrick Cigarruista, financial advisor

==== Primary results ====
Republican primary results
Party	Candidate	Votes	%
Republican	Samuel Williams	5,097	31.3
Republican	Irene Armendariz-Jackson	4,147	25.4
Republican	Anthony Aguero	2,184	13.4
Republican	Jaime Arriola Jr.	2,115	13.0
Republican	Patrick Cigarruista	1,100	6.8
Total votes		16,305	100.0

==== Runoff results ====
Republican primary runoff results
Party	Candidate	Votes	%
Republican	Irene Armendariz-Jackson	5,170	65.4
Republican	Samuel Williams	2,731	34.6
Total votes		7,901	100.0

=== General election ===
==== Predictions ====
Source	Ranking	As of
The Cook Political Report	Safe D	July 2, 2020
FiveThirtyEight	Solid D	October 13, 2020
Inside Elections	Safe D	June 2, 2020
Sabato's Crystal Ball	Safe D	July 2, 2020
Politico	Safe D	April 19, 2020
Daily Kos	Safe D	June 3, 2020
RCP	Safe D	June 9, 2020
270toWin	Safe D	June 7, 2020

==== Results ====
Texas's 16th congressional district, 2020
Party	Candidate	Votes	%
Democratic	Veronica Escobar (incumbent)	154,108	64.7
Republican	Irene Armendariz-Jackson	84,006	35.3
Total votes		238,114	100.0
Democratic hold			

== District 17 ==
2020 Texas's 17th congressional district election
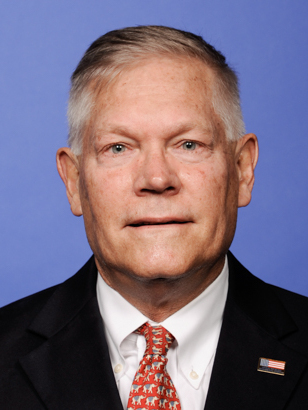

Nominee	Pete Sessions	Rick Kennedy
Party	Republican	Democratic
Popular vote	171,390	125,565
Percentage	55.9%	40.9%
- County results Sessions: 50–60% 60–70% 70–80% 80–90% Kennedy: 60–70%
U.S. Representative before election
Bill Flores
Republican
Elected U.S. Representative
Pete Sessions
Republican

The 17th district covers parts of suburban north Austin stretching to rural central Texas, including Waco and Bryan-College Station. The incumbent was Republican Bill Flores, who was re-elected with 56.8% of the vote in 2018. On September 4, 2019, Flores announced that he would not be running for re-election in order to spend more time with his family.

=== Republican primary ===
==== Candidates ====
===== Nominee =====
- Pete Sessions, former U.S. representative for Texas's 32nd congressional district (2003–2019)

===== Eliminated in runoff =====
- Renée Swann, healthcare executive

===== Eliminated in primary =====
- Ahmad Adnan, financial advisor
- Scott Bland, construction company owner
- George Hindman, rocket scientist
- Todd Kent, former assistant dean for Texas A&M University at Qatar
- Laurie Godfrey McReynolds, real estate agent
- Jeff Oppenheim, U.S. Army veteran
- Kristen Alamo Rowin, real estate agent
- David Saucedo, safety coordinator
- Trent Sutton, U.S. Marine Corps veteran
- Elianor Vessali, College Station city councilwoman

===== Declined =====
- James Edge, district director for U.S. Representative Bill Flores
- Bill Flores, incumbent U.S. representative
- Wes Lloyd, Brazos River Authority board member

==== Endorsements ====
Pete Sessions

Organizations

- NRA Political Victory Fund
Renée Swann

Federal officials

- Bill Flores, U.S. representative (TX-17)

State officials

- John N. Raney, state representative
- Charles Schwertner, state senator and former state representative (2011–2013)

Organizations

- Susan B. Anthony List

==== Primary results ====
2020 Texas's 17th congressional district Republican primary initial round results by county Sessions: Sessions—50–60%; Sessions—40–50%; Sessions—30–40%; Sessions—<30%; Swann: Swann—30–40%; Hindman: Hindman—<30%

Republican primary results
Party	Candidate	Votes	%
Republican	Pete Sessions	21,706	31.6
Republican	Renée Swann	13,072	19.0
Republican	George W. Hindman	12,405	18.1
Republican	Elianor Vessali	6,286	9.2
Republican	Scott Bland	4,947	7.2
Republican	Trent Sutton	3,662	5.3
Republican	Todd Kent	2,367	3.5
Republican	Kristen Alamo Rowin	1,183	1.7
Republican	Laurie Godfrey McReynolds	1,105	1.6
Republican	David Saucedo	975	1.4
Republican	Jeff Oppenheim	483	0.7
Republican	Ahmad Adnan	477	0.7
Total votes		68,668	100.0

==== Runoff results ====
Results by county Sessions: 50–60%; 60–70%; Swann: 50–60%; 60–70%; Tie

Republican primary runoff results
Party	Candidate	Votes	%
Republican	Pete Sessions	18,524	53.5
Republican	Renée Swann	16,096	46.5
Total votes		34,620	100.0

=== Democratic primary ===
==== Candidates ====
===== Nominee =====
- Rick Kennedy, software developer and nominee for Texas's 17th congressional district in 2018

===== Eliminated in runoff =====
- David Anthony Jaramillo, U.S. Marine Corps veteran, and recipient of the Presidential Service Badge

===== Eliminated in primary =====
- William Foster III, educator and former NASA employee

==== Primary results ====
2020 Texas's 17th congressional district Democratic primary initial round results by county Kennedy: Kennedy—60–70%; Kennedy—50–60%; Kennedy—40–50%; Foster: Foster—50–60%

Democratic primary results
Party	Candidate	Votes	%
Democratic	Rick Kennedy	22,148	47.9
Democratic	David Anthony Jaramillo	16,170	35.0
Democratic	William Foster III	7,887	17.1
Total votes		46,205	100.0

==== Runoff results ====
Democratic primary runoff results
Party	Candidate	Votes	%
Democratic	Rick Kennedy	13,496	57.3
Democratic	David Anthony Jaramillo	10,054	42.7
Total votes		23,550	100.0

=== Third parties ===
==== Candidates ====
===== Declared =====
- Ted Brown (Libertarian), small business owner and insurance claims adjuster

=== General election ===
==== Predictions ====
Source	Ranking	As of
The Cook Political Report	Safe R	October 21, 2020
FiveThirtyEight	Solid R	October 30, 2020
Inside Elections	Safe R	October 28, 2020
Sabato's Crystal Ball	Safe R	October 20, 2020
Politico	Likely R	October 11, 2020
Daily Kos	Safe R	April 29, 2020
RCP	Safe R	October 30, 2020
270toWin	Safe R	October 29, 2020

==== Polling ====
Poll source	Date(s) administered	Sample size	Margin of error	Pete Sessions (R)	Rick Kennedy (D)	Undecided
Lincoln Park Strategies (D) (Note: Poll sponsored by Kennedy's campaign)	August 22–23, 2020	1,160 (LV)	± 4.38%	45%	42%	13%

==== Results ====
Texas's 17th congressional district, 2020
Party	Candidate	Votes	%
Republican	Pete Sessions	171,390	55.9
Democratic	Rick Kennedy	125,565	40.9
Libertarian	Ted Brown	9,918	3.2
Total votes		306,873	100.0
Republican hold			

== District 18 ==
2020 Texas's 18th congressional district election
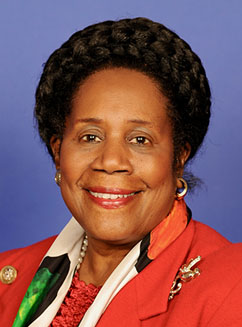

Nominee	Sheila Jackson Lee	Wendell Champion
Party	Democratic	Republican
Popular vote	180,952	58,033
Percentage	73.3%	23.5%
- County results Lee: 70–80%
U.S. Representative before election
Sheila Jackson Lee
Democratic
Elected U.S. Representative
Sheila Jackson Lee
Democratic

The 18th district is based in Downtown Houston and takes in the heavily black areas of Central Houston. The incumbent was Democrat Sheila Jackson Lee, who was re-elected with 75.3% of the vote in 2018.

=== Democratic primary ===
==== Candidates ====
===== Nominee =====
- Sheila Jackson Lee, incumbent U.S. representative

===== Eliminated in primary =====
- Michael Allen, landscape architect
- Donovan Boson, public administrator
- Marc Flores, construction manager
- Jerry Ford Sr., businessman
- Stevens Orozco, teacher

==== Primary results ====
Democratic primary results
Party	Candidate	Votes	%
Democratic	Sheila Jackson Lee (incumbent)	49,729	77.1
Democratic	Marc Flores	5,353	8.3
Democratic	Bimal Patel	2,456	3.8
Democratic	Jerry Ford Sr.	2,417	3.7
Democratic	Stevens Orozco	2,180	3.4
Democratic	Michael Allen	1,672	2.6
Democratic	Donovan Boson	709	1.1
Total votes		64,516	100.0

=== Republican primary ===
==== Candidates ====
===== Nominee =====
- Wendell Champion, attorney and U.S. Army veteran

===== Eliminated in runoff =====
- Robert Cadena, businessman

===== Eliminated in primary =====
- Nellie Heiksell, minister
- T.C. Manning, service technician
- Nathan Milliron, attorney
- Ava Reynero Pate, candidate for Texas's 18th congressional district in 2016 and 2018

==== Primary results ====
Republican primary results
Party	Candidate	Votes	%
Republican	Wendell Champion	3,428	35.1
Republican	Robert Cadena	2,005	20.5
Republican	T.C. Manning	1,823	18.7
Republican	Nathan Milliron	1,076	11.0
Republican	Ava Reynero Pate	794	8.1
Republican	Nellie Heiksell	638	6.5
Total votes		9,764	100.0

==== Runoff results ====
Republican primary runoff results
Party	Candidate	Votes	%
Republican	Wendell Champion	4,000	71.8
Republican	Robert Cadena	1,570	28.2
Total votes		5,570	100.0

=== General election ===
==== Predictions ====
Source	Ranking	As of
The Cook Political Report	Safe D	July 2, 2020
FiveThirtyEight	Solid D	October 13, 2020
Inside Elections	Safe D	June 2, 2020
Sabato's Crystal Ball	Safe D	July 2, 2020
Politico	Safe D	April 19, 2020
Daily Kos	Safe D	June 3, 2020
RCP	Safe D	June 9, 2020
270toWin	Safe D	June 7, 2020

==== Results ====
Texas's 18th congressional district, 2020
Party	Candidate	Votes	%
Democratic	Sheila Jackson Lee (incumbent)	180,952	73.3
Republican	Wendell Champion	58,033	23.5
Libertarian	Luke Spencer	4,514	1.8
Independent	Vince Duncan	3,396	1.4
Total votes		246,895	100.0
Democratic hold			

== District 19 ==
2020 Texas's 19th congressional district election
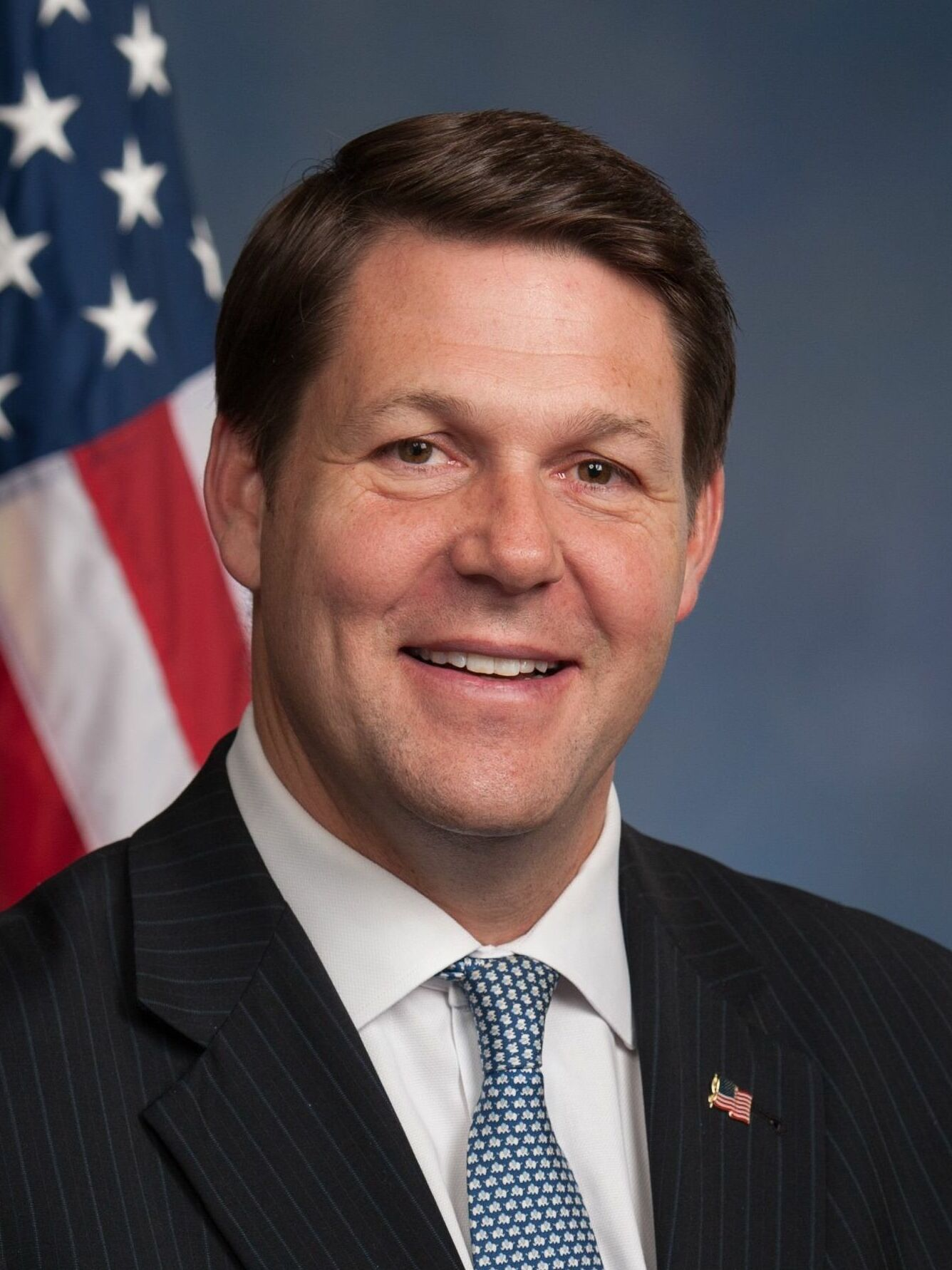

Nominee	Jodey Arrington	Tom Watson
Party	Republican	Democratic
Popular vote	198,198	60,583
Percentage	74.8%	22.9%
U.S. Representative before election
Jodey Arrington
Republican
Elected U.S. Representative
Jodey Arrington
Republican

The 19th district encompasses rural West Texas, taking in Lubbock. The incumbent was Republican Jodey Arrington, who was re-elected with 75.2% of the vote in 2018.

=== Republican primary ===
==== Candidates ====
===== Nominee =====
- Jodey Arrington, incumbent U.S. representative

===== Eliminated in primary =====
- Vance Boyd, stuntman

===== Not on ballot =====
- Kezia Tunnell

==== Primary results ====
Republican primary results
Party	Candidate	Votes	%
Republican	Jodey Arrington (incumbent)	71,234	89.4
Republican	Vance Boyd	8,410	10.6
Total votes		79,644	100.0

=== Democratic primary ===
==== Candidates ====
===== Nominee =====
- Tom Watson, attorney

==== Primary results ====
Democratic primary results
Party	Candidate	Votes	%
Democratic	Tom Watson	19,993	100.0
Total votes		19,993	100.0

=== General election ===
==== Predictions ====
Source	Ranking	As of
The Cook Political Report	Safe R	July 2, 2020
FiveThirtyEight	Solid R	October 13, 2020
Inside Elections	Safe R	June 2, 2020
Sabato's Crystal Ball	Safe R	July 2, 2020
Politico	Safe R	April 19, 2020
Daily Kos	Safe R	June 3, 2020
RCP	Safe R	June 9, 2020
270toWin	Safe R	June 7, 2020

==== Results ====
Texas's 19th congressional district, 2020
Party	Candidate	Votes	%
Republican	Jodey Arrington (incumbent)	198,198	74.8
Democratic	Tom Watson	60,583	22.9
Libertarian	Joe Burnes	6,271	2.4
Total votes		265,052	100.0
Republican hold			

== District 20 ==
2020 Texas's 20th congressional district election
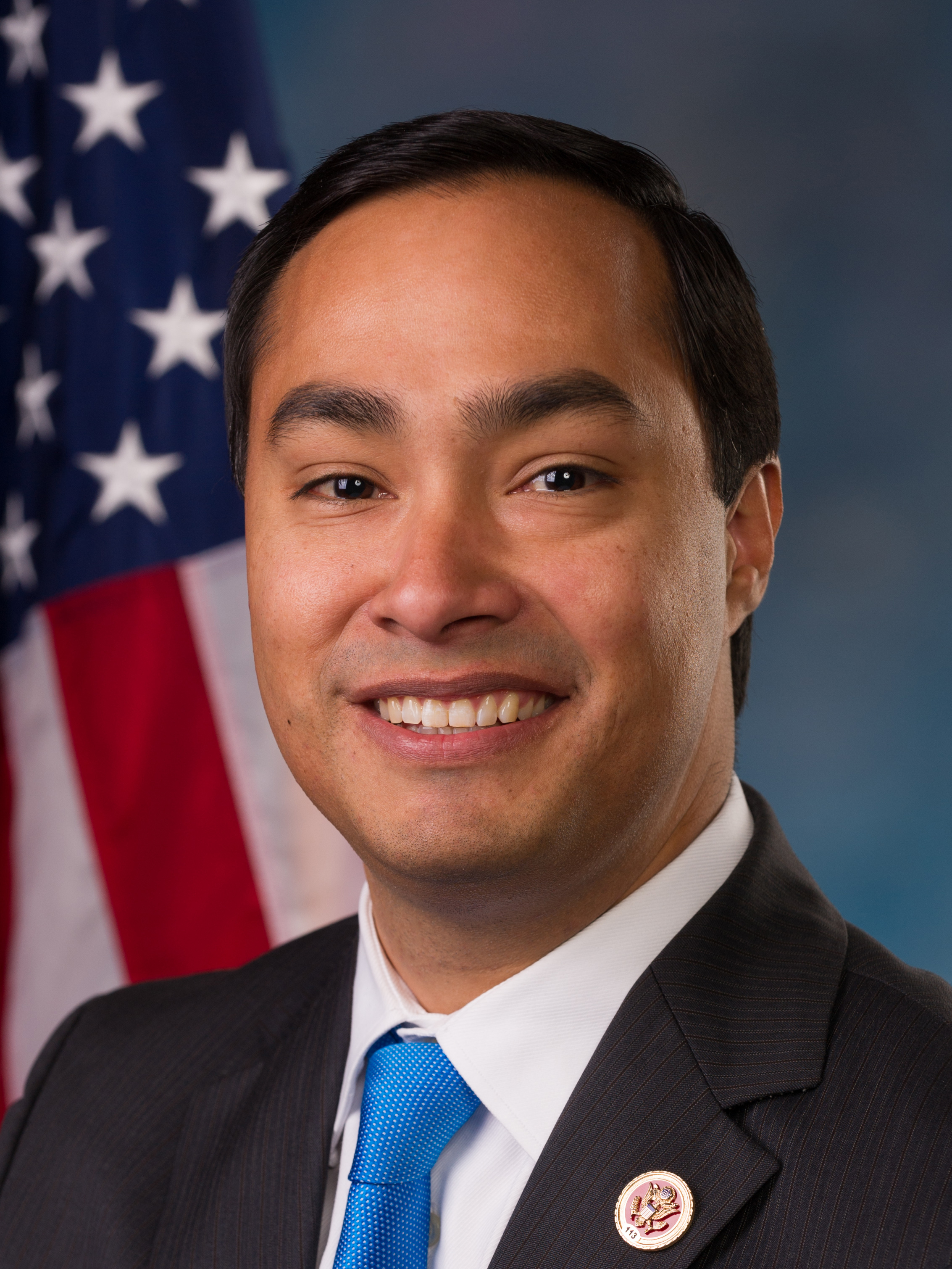

Nominee	Joaquin Castro	Mauro Garza
Party	Democratic	Republican
Popular vote	175,078	89,628
Percentage	64.7%	33.1%
- County results Castro: 60–70%
U.S. Representative before election
Joaquin Castro
Democratic
Elected U.S. Representative
Joaquin Castro
Democratic

The 20th district encompasses downtown San Antonio. The incumbent was Democrat Joaquin Castro, who was re-elected with 80.9% of the vote in 2018 without major-party opposition.

=== Democratic primary ===
==== Candidates ====
===== Nominee =====
- Joaquin Castro, incumbent U.S. representative

===== Eliminated in primary =====
- Rob Hostetler, U.S. Air Force veteran
- Justin Lecea, co-op manager

==== Primary results ====
Democratic primary results
Party	Candidate	Votes	%
Democratic	Joaquín Castro (incumbent)	61,861	92.1
Democratic	Justin Lecea	3,047	4.5
Democratic	Rob Hostetler	2,252	3.4
Total votes		67,160	100.0

=== Republican primary ===
==== Candidates ====
===== Nominee =====
- Mauro Garza, club owner and candidate for Texas's 21st congressional district in 2018

===== Eliminated in runoff =====
- Gary Allen, retired teacher

===== Eliminated in primary =====
- Dominick Dina, real estate agent
- Anita Kegley, construction business owner
- Tammy Orta, registered nurse

==== Primary results ====
Republican primary results
Party	Candidate	Votes	%
Republican	Mauro Garza	7,720	33.3
Republican	Gary Allen	6,230	26.9
Republican	Dominick Dina	5,242	22.6
Republican	Anita Kegley	2,210	9.5
Republican	Tammy Orta	1,786	7.7
Total votes		23,188	100.0

==== Runoff results ====
Republican primary runoff results
Party	Candidate	Votes	%
Republican	Mauro Garza	7,162	60.1
Republican	Gary Allen	4,762	39.9
Total votes		11,924	100.0

=== General election ===
==== Predictions ====
Source	Ranking	As of
The Cook Political Report	Safe D	July 2, 2020
FiveThirtyEight	Solid D	October 13, 2020
Inside Elections	Safe D	June 2, 2020
Sabato's Crystal Ball	Safe D	July 2, 2020
Politico	Safe D	April 19, 2020
Daily Kos	Safe D	June 3, 2020
RCP	Safe D	June 9, 2020
270toWin	Safe D	June 7, 2020

==== Results ====
Texas's 20th congressional district, 2020
Party	Candidate	Votes	%
Democratic	Joaquín Castro (incumbent)	175,078	64.7
Republican	Mauro Garza	89,628	33.1
Libertarian	Jeffrey Blunt	6,017	2.2
Total votes		270,723	100.0
Democratic hold			

== District 21 ==
2020 Texas's 21st congressional district election
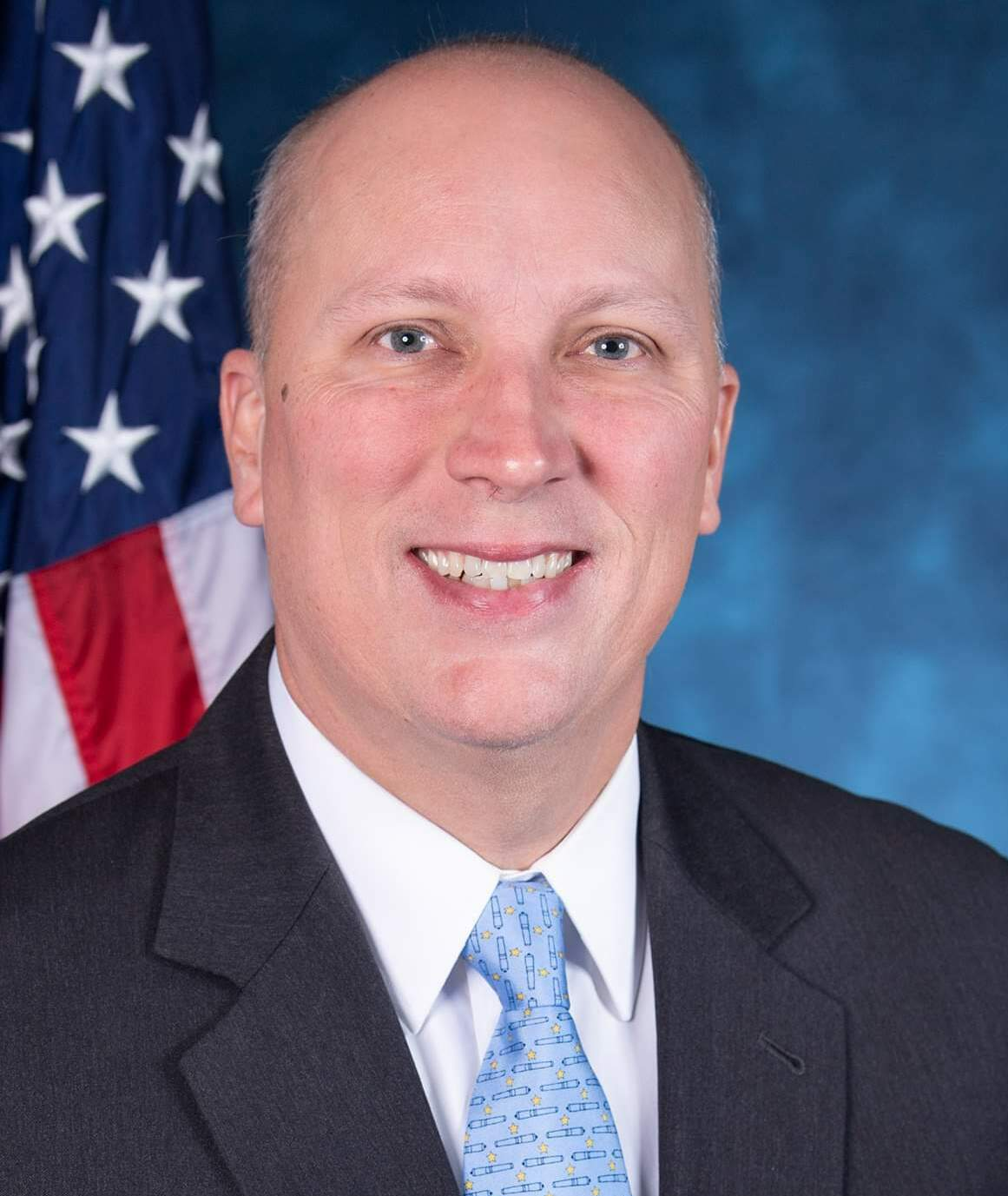

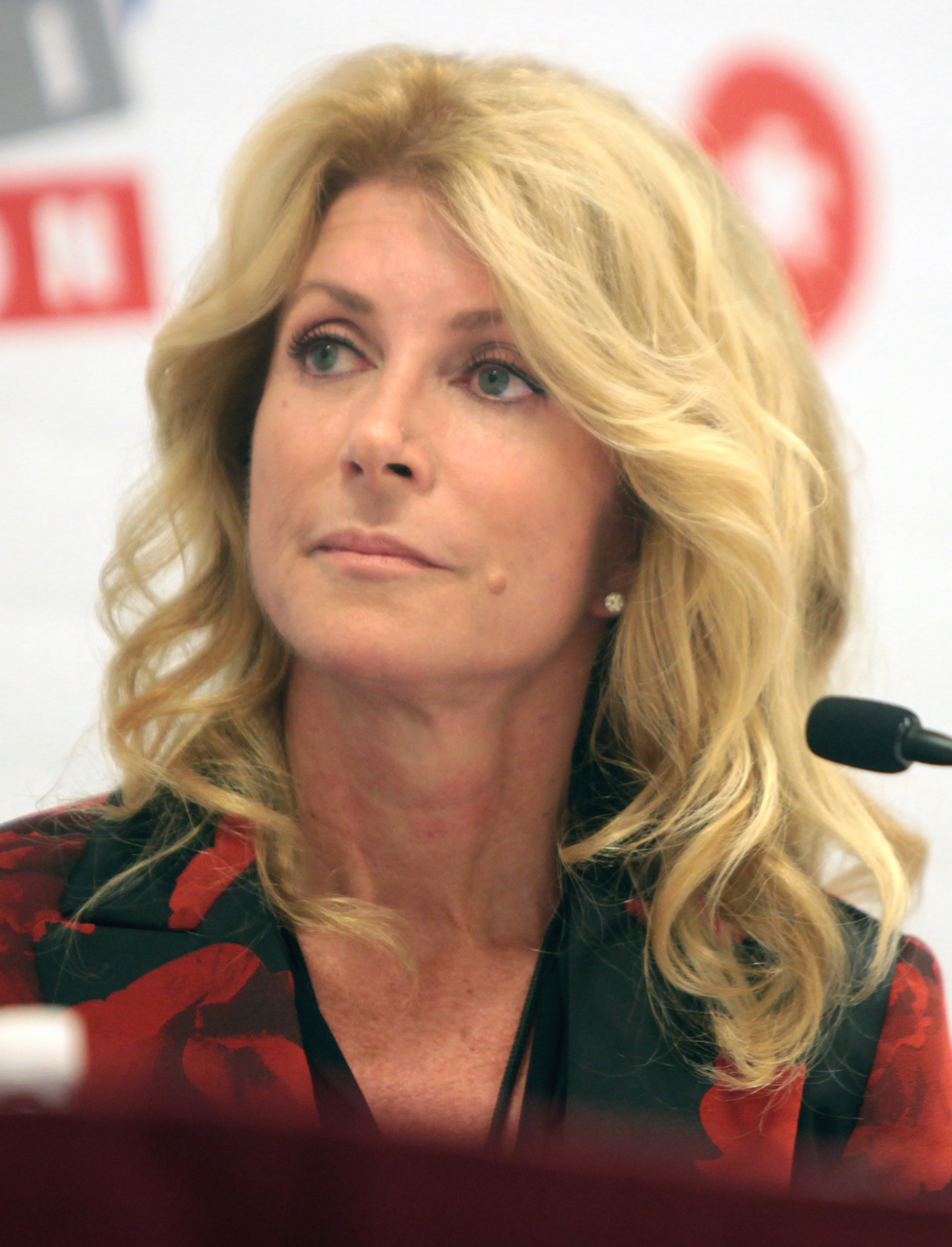
Nominee	Chip Roy	Wendy Davis
Party	Republican	Democratic
Popular vote	235,740	205,780
Percentage	52.0%	45.3%
- County results Roy: 40–50% 70–80% 80–90% Davis: 40–50% 70–80%
U.S. Representative before election
Chip Roy
Republican
Elected U.S. Representative
Chip Roy
Republican

The 21st district extends from north San Antonio to central and south Austin, taking in rural parts of the Texas Hill Country. The Democratic nominee is former Texas state senator and 2014 gubernatorial nominee, Wendy Davis. Perennial candidate Arthur DiBianca was nominated by the Libertarian party convention on March 21, 2020. The incumbent was Republican Chip Roy, who was elected with 50.2% of the vote in 2018.

=== Republican primary ===
==== Candidates ====
===== Nominee =====
- Chip Roy, incumbent U.S. representative

==== Primary results ====
Republican primary results
Party	Candidate	Votes	%
Republican	Chip Roy (incumbent)	75,389	100.0
Total votes		75,389	100.0

=== Democratic primary ===
==== Candidates ====
===== Declared =====
- Wendy Davis, former state senator and nominee for governor of Texas in 2014

===== Eliminated in runoff =====
- Jennie Lou Leeder, nominee for Texas's 11th congressional district in 2018

==== Primary results ====
Democratic primary results
Party	Candidate	Votes	%
Democratic	Wendy Davis	84,593	86.3
Democratic	Jennie Lou Leeder	13,485	13.7
Total votes		98,078	100.0

=== Endorsements ===
Wendy Davis (D)

U.S. presidents

- Barack Obama, 44th president of the United States (2009–2017)

U.S. vice presidents

- Joe Biden, 47th vice president of the United States (2009–2017) and 2020 Democratic nominee for president

U.S. senators

- Elizabeth Warren, U.S. senator from Massachusetts (2013–present), former 2020 presidential candidate

U.S. representatives

- Gabby Giffords, former U.S. representative from AZ-08 (2007–2012)

Labor unions

- International Union of Bricklayers and Allied Craftworkers
- Texas AFL-CIO
- United Steelworkers

Newspapers

- The Austin American-Statesman
- The Austin Chronicle

Organizations

- Annie's List
- Brady Campaign
- Democratic Congressional Campaign Committee
- EMILY's List
- End Citizens United
- Everytown for Gun Safety
- Human Rights Campaign
- Indivisible
- League of Conservation Voters Action Fund
- NARAL Pro-Choice America
- New Democrat Coalition
- Planned Parenthood Action Fund
- Sierra Club
- Stonewall Democrats
Chip Roy (R)

U.S. federal executive officials

- Rick Perry, former Secretary of Energy (2017–2019) and former governor of Texas (2000–2015)

U.S. senators

- Ted Cruz, U.S. senator from Texas (2013–present)
- Mike Lee, U.S. senator from Utah (2011–present)
- Rand Paul, U.S. senator from Kentucky (2011–present)

U.S. representatives

- Louie Gohmert, U.S. representative from TX-01 (2005–present)
- Lamar Smith, former U.S. representative from TX-21 (1987–2019)

Governors

- Greg Abbott, governor of Texas (2015–present)

Municipal officials

- Susan Narvaiz, former mayor of San Marcos, Texas (2004–2010), 2012 Republican candidate for U.S. Representative from TX-21

Individuals

- David Bossie, President and Chairman of Citizens United
- Steve Deace, political activist and talk show host
- Erick Erickson, political blogger and radio show host
- Daniel Horowitz, defense attorney and media personality
- Mark Levin, author and radio personality
- Jenny Beth Martin, co-founder and national coordinator of Tea Party Patriots, columnist

Labor unions

- National Border Patrol Council

Organizations

- Associated Builders and Contractors
- Club for Growth
- Empower Texans
- FreedomWorks
- Gun Owners of America
- National Federation of Independent Business
- National Right to Life Committee
- NRA Political Victory Fund
- NumbersUSA
- Safari Club International
- Senate Conservatives Fund
- Susan B. Anthony List
- Tea Party Patriots
- Texas and Southwestern Cattle Raisers Association
- Texas Farm Bureau

=== General election ===
==== Predictions ====
Source	Ranking	As of
The Cook Political Report	Tossup	November 2, 2020
FiveThirtyEight	Lean R	November 2, 2020
Inside Elections	Tossup	November 2, 2020
Sabato's Crystal Ball	Lean R	November 2, 2020
Politico	Tossup	November 2, 2020
Daily Kos	Tossup	November 2, 2020
RCP	Tossup	November 2, 2020
270toWin	Tossup	November 2, 2020

==== Polling ====
Poll source	Date(s) administered	Sample size	Margin of error	Chip Roy (R)	Wendy Davis (D)	Other	Undecided
WPA Intelligence (R) (Note: Poll sponsored by the Club for Growth, which has endorsed Roy prior to the sampling period.)	October 11–12, 2020	412 (LV)	–	47%	42%	3%	8%
Garin-Hart-Yang Research (D) (Note: Poll sponsored by Davis' campaign)	August 31 – September 4, 2020	401 (LV)	± 5%	47%	48%	–	–
ALG Research (D) (Note: Poll conducted for End Citizens United, which has endorsed Davis prior to this poll's sampling period.)	August 15–20, 2020	500 (LV)	± 4.4%	46%	46%	–	–
Garin-Hart-Yang Research (D)	July 14–17, 2020	500 (LV)	± 4.25%	46%	45%	–	–

Hypothetical polling

with Generic Democrat and Generic Republican

Poll source	Date(s) administered	Sample size	Margin of error	Generic Democrat	Generic Republican	Undecided
Public Policy Polling (D)	September 19–21, 2019	523 (LV) – 656 (LV)	± 3.8% – ± 4.2%	44%	49%	–

==== Results ====
Texas's 21st congressional district, 2020
Party	Candidate	Votes	%
Republican	Chip Roy (incumbent)	235,740	52.0
Democratic	Wendy Davis	205,780	45.3
Libertarian	Arthur DiBlanca	8,666	1.9
Green	Tom Wakely	3,564	0.8
Total votes		453,750	100.0
Republican hold			

== District 22 ==
2020 Texas's 22nd congressional district election
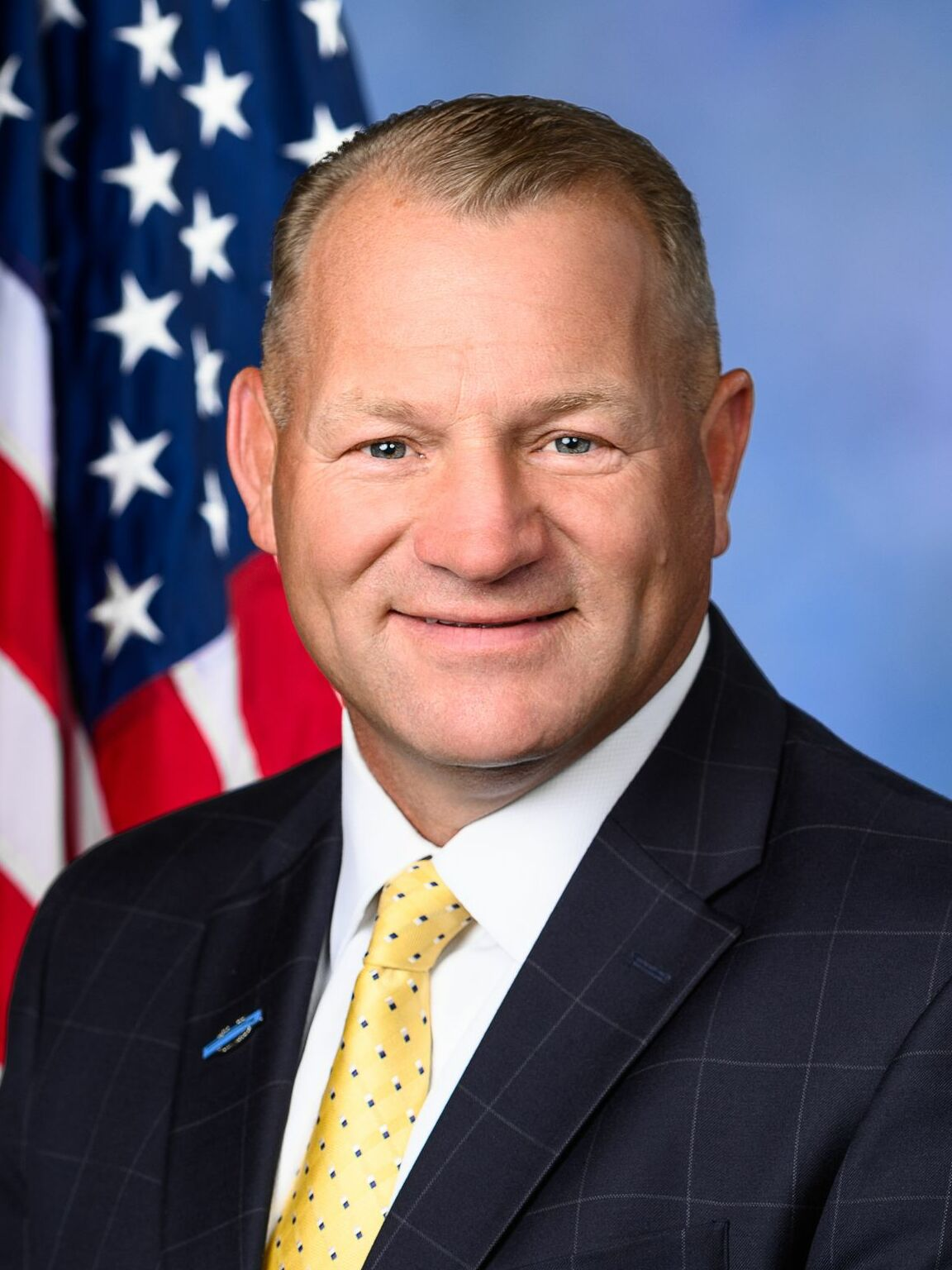

Nominee	Troy Nehls	Sri Preston Kulkarni
Party	Republican	Democratic
Popular vote	210,259	181,998
Percentage	51.5%	44.6%
- County results Nehls: 40–50% 50–60%
U.S. Representative before election
Pete Olson
Republican
Elected U.S. Representative
Troy Nehls
Republican

The 22nd district encompasses the south-central Greater Houston metropolitan area, including the southern Houston suburbs of Sugar Land, Pearland, and Webster. Incumbent Republican Pete Olson was re-elected with 51.4% of the vote in 2018, his narrowest victory ever, and announced on July 25, 2019, that he would not seek re-election.

=== Republican primary ===
==== Candidates ====
===== Nominee =====
- Troy Nehls, Fort Bend County sheriff

===== Eliminated in runoff =====
- Kathaleen Wall, GOP donor and candidate for Texas's 2nd congressional district in 2018

===== Eliminated in primary =====
- Pierce Bush, CEO of Big Brothers Big Sisters Houston affiliate, grandson of former U.S. President George H. W. Bush, and nephew of former U.S. president and former governor of Texas George W. Bush
- Jonathan Camarillo, U.S. Marine Corps veteran
- Douglas Haggard, attorney
- Aaron Hermes, professional sitar player
- Greg Hill, Brazoria County court judge and former Pearland city councilman
- Matt Hinton, finance manager
- Dan Mathews, engineer and businessman
- Diana Miller, real estate broker
- Shandon Phan, attorney
- Bangar Reddy, former president of the India Culture Center of Houston
- Joe Walz, U.S. Army veteran and businessman

===== Declined =====
- Roger Clemens, former Major League Baseball pitcher for Houston Astros
- Pete Olson, incumbent U.S. representative
- John Zerwas, state representative

===== Endorsements =====
Pierce Bush (eliminated)

Federal officials

- Pete Olson, U.S. representative (TX-22)
- Ted Poe, former U.S. representative (TX-02) (2005–2019)

State officials

- John Zerwas, former state representative (2007–2019)

Individuals

- Roger Clemens, former MLB baseball pitcher
- Jim McIngvale, businessman
- Chuck Norris, actor
Troy Nehls

Individuals

- Michael Berry, radio host

Newspapers

- Houston Chronicle

Organizations

- U.S. Chamber of Commerce
Kathaleen Wall (eliminated)

Federal officials

- Rand Paul, U.S. senator from Kentucky
- Randy Weber, U.S. representative (TX-14)

State officials

- Dwayne Bohac, state representative
- Dawn Buckingham, state senator
- Briscoe Cain, state representative
- Wayne Christian, Railroad Commission chairman
- Bob Hall, state senator
- Bryan Hughes, state senator and former state representative (2003–2017)
- Mayes Middleton, state representative
- Sid Miller, state agriculture commissioner and former state representative (2001–2013)
- Joe Nixon, former state representative (1995–2007)
- Ken Paxton, state attorney general and former state senator (2013–2015) and state representative (2003–2013)
- Matt Rinaldi, former state representative (2015–2019)
- Jonathan Stickland, state representative
- Steve Toth, state representative

Organizations

- Concerned Women for America LAC
- National Association for Gun Rights
- Susan B. Anthony List
- Texas Right to Life PAC

==== Primary results ====
Republican primary results
Party	Candidate	Votes	%
Republican	Troy Nehls	29,538	40.5
Republican	Kathaleen Wall	14,201	19.4
Republican	Pierce Bush	11,281	15.4
Republican	Greg Hill	10,315	14.1
Republican	Dan Mathews	2,165	3.0
Republican	Bangar Reddy	1,144	1.6
Republican	Joe Walz	1,039	1.4
Republican	Shandon Phan	773	1.1
Republican	Diana Miller	771	1.0
Republican	Jon Camarillo	718	1.0
Republican	Douglas Haggard	398	0.5
Republican	Howard Steele	283	0.4
Republican	Matt Hinton	274	0.4
Republican	Brandon T. Penko	96	0.1
Republican	Aaron Hermes	92	0.1
Total votes		73,133	100.0

==== Polling ====
Poll source	Date(s) administered	Sample size	Margin of error	Troy Nehls	Kathaleen Wall	Undecided
Remington Research Group (R) (Note: Poll sponsored by Troy Nehls' campaign)	March 7–8, 2020	507 (LV)	± 4.4%	61%	28%	11%

==== Runoff results ====
Republican primary runoff results
Party	Candidate	Votes	%
Republican	Troy Nehls	36,132	69.9
Republican	Kathaleen Wall	15,547	30.1
Total votes		51,679	100.0

=== Democratic primary ===
==== Candidates ====
===== Nominee =====
- Sri Preston Kulkarni, former diplomat and former Democratic nominee for Texas's 22nd congressional district in 2018

===== Eliminated in primary =====
- Chris Fernandez, retiree
- Nyanza Davis Moore, television news commentator and attorney
- Carmine Petricco III, former electrician
- Derrick Reed, Pearland city councilman

===== Endorsements =====
Sri Preston Kulkarni

Cabinet-level officials

- Julian Castro, former United States Secretary of Housing and Urban Development (2014–17), former mayor of San Antonio (2009–14), and former 2020 presidential candidate

U.S. State Department officials

- Gina Abercrombie-Winstanley, former United States Ambassador to Malta (2012–2016)
- Jeff Bleich, former United States Ambassador to Australia (2009–2013)
- Michele Thoren Bond, former Assistant Secretary of State for Consular Affairs (2014–2017) and former United States Ambassador to Lesotho (2010–2012)
- Tom Countryman, former Acting Under Secretary of State for Arms Control and International Security Affairs (2016–2017) and former Assistant Secretary of State for International Security and Nonproliferation (2011–2017)
- Caroline Kennedy, former United States Ambassador to Japan (2013–2017)
- Vinai Thummalapally, former United States Ambassador to Belize (2009–2013)
- Richard Verma, former United States Ambassador to India (2015–2017) and former Assistant Secretary of State for Legislative Affairs (2009–2011)

U.S. senators

- Amy Klobuchar, U.S. senator from Minnesota

U.S. representatives

- Joaquin Castro, U.S. representative from Texas's 20th congressional district
- Sylvia Garcia, U.S. representative from Texas's 29th congressional district
- Raja Krishnamoorthi, U.S. representative from Illinois's 8th congressional district
- Nick Lampson, former U.S. representative Texas's 22nd congressional district (2007–2009) and (TX-09) (1997–2005)
- Ted Lieu, U.S. representative from California's 33rd congressional district
- Tom Malinowski, U.S. representative from New Jersey's 7th congressional district
- Seth Moulton, U.S. representative from Massachusetts's 6th congressional district
- Lucille Roybal-Allard, U.S. representative from California's 40th congressional district

State officials

- Garnet Coleman, state representative
- Philip Cortez, state representative
- Wendy Davis, former state senator (2009–2015), former Fort Worth City Council member (1999–2008), Democratic nominee in 2014 Texas gubernatorial election, and candidate for TX-21 in 2020
- Trey Fischer, state representative
- Celia Israel, state representative

County officials

- Adrian Garcia, Harris County commissioner, former Harris County sheriff (2009–2015), and former Houston City Council member (2004–2009)

Local officials

- Annise Parker, former mayor of Houston (2010–2016), former city controller (2004–2010), and former Houston City Council member (1998–2004)
- Abdul El-Sayed, former executive director of the Detroit Health Department (2015–2017) and 2018 Michigan gubernatorial candidate

Labor unions

- Communication Workers of America
- Iron Workers Local 84
- Laborers' International Union of North America Local 350
- Texas AFL-CIO
- United Food and Commercial Workers Local 455

Newspapers

- Houston Chronicle

Organizations

- Asian American Action Fund
- Bend the Arc
- Blue Dog PAC
- Brady Campaign
- CHC Bold PAC
- End Citizens United
- Everytown for Gun Safety
- Giffords
- Hindu American Foundation
- Human Rights Campaign
- J Street
- League of Conservation Voters Action Fund
- NARAL
- New Dems Action Fund
- Planned Parenthood Action Fund
- Sierra Club

==== Primary results ====
Democratic primary results
Party	Candidate	Votes	%
Democratic	Sri Preston Kulkarni	34,664	53.1
Democratic	Derrick Reed	16,126	24.7
Democratic	Nyanza Davis Moore	9,449	14.5
Democratic	Carmine Petricco III	5,074	7.8
Total votes		65,313	100.0

=== General election ===
==== Predictions ====
Source	Ranking	As of
The Cook Political Report	Tossup	November 2, 2020
FiveThirtyEight	Lean R	November 2, 2020
Inside Elections	Tossup	November 2, 2020
Sabato's Crystal Ball	Lean R	November 2, 2020
Politico	Tossup	November 2, 2020
Daily Kos	Tossup	November 2, 2020
RCP	Tossup	November 2, 2020
270toWin	Tossup	November 2, 2020

==== Polling ====
Poll source	Date(s) administered	Sample size	Margin of error	Troy Nehls (R)	Sri Preston Kulkarni (D)	Joseph LeBlanc (L)	Other	Undecided
GBAO Strategies (D)	October 8–11, 2020	500 (LV)	± 4.4%	43%	48%	4%	–	5%
GBAO Strategies (D)	September 24–27, 2020	500 (LV)	± 4.4%	44%	47%	3%	–	–
GBAO Strategies (D)	Mid August, 2020	– (V)	–	45%	46%	3%	–	–
GBAO Strategies (D)	Early August, 2020	– (V)	–	46%	43%	6%	–	–
GBAO Strategies (D)	July 29 – August 2, 2020	400 (LV)	± 4.9%	46%	46%	–	2% (Note: "Someone else" with 2%)	6%
RMG Research	July 27 – August 2, 2020	500 (RV)	± 4.5%	39%	39%	–	–	22%
Meeting Street Insights (R)	July 19–22, 2020	400 (RV)	± 4.9%	44%	32%	5%	–	17%

Hypothetical polling

with Generic Democrat and Generic Republican

Poll source	Date(s) administered	Sample size	Margin of error	Generic Democrat	Generic Republican	Undecided
Public Policy Polling (D)	Sep 19–21, 2019	523 (LV) – 656 (LV)	± 3.8% – ± 4.2%	45%	49%	–

===== Post-primary endorsements =====
Sri Preston Kulkarni (D)

U.S. presidents

- Barack Obama, 44th president of the United States

U.S. vice presidents

- Joe Biden, 47th vice president of the United States and 2020 Democratic nominee for president
Troy Nehls (R)

U.S. presidents

- Donald Trump, 45th president of the United States

Organizations

- SEAL PAC
- Texas Alliance for Life

==== Results ====
Texas's 22nd congressional district, 2020
Party	Candidate	Votes	%
Republican	Troy Nehls	210,259	51.5
Democratic	Sri Preston Kulkarni	181,998	44.6
Libertarian	Joseph LeBlanc Jr.	15,791	3.9
Total votes		408,048	100.0
Republican hold			

== District 23 ==
2020 Texas's 23rd congressional district election
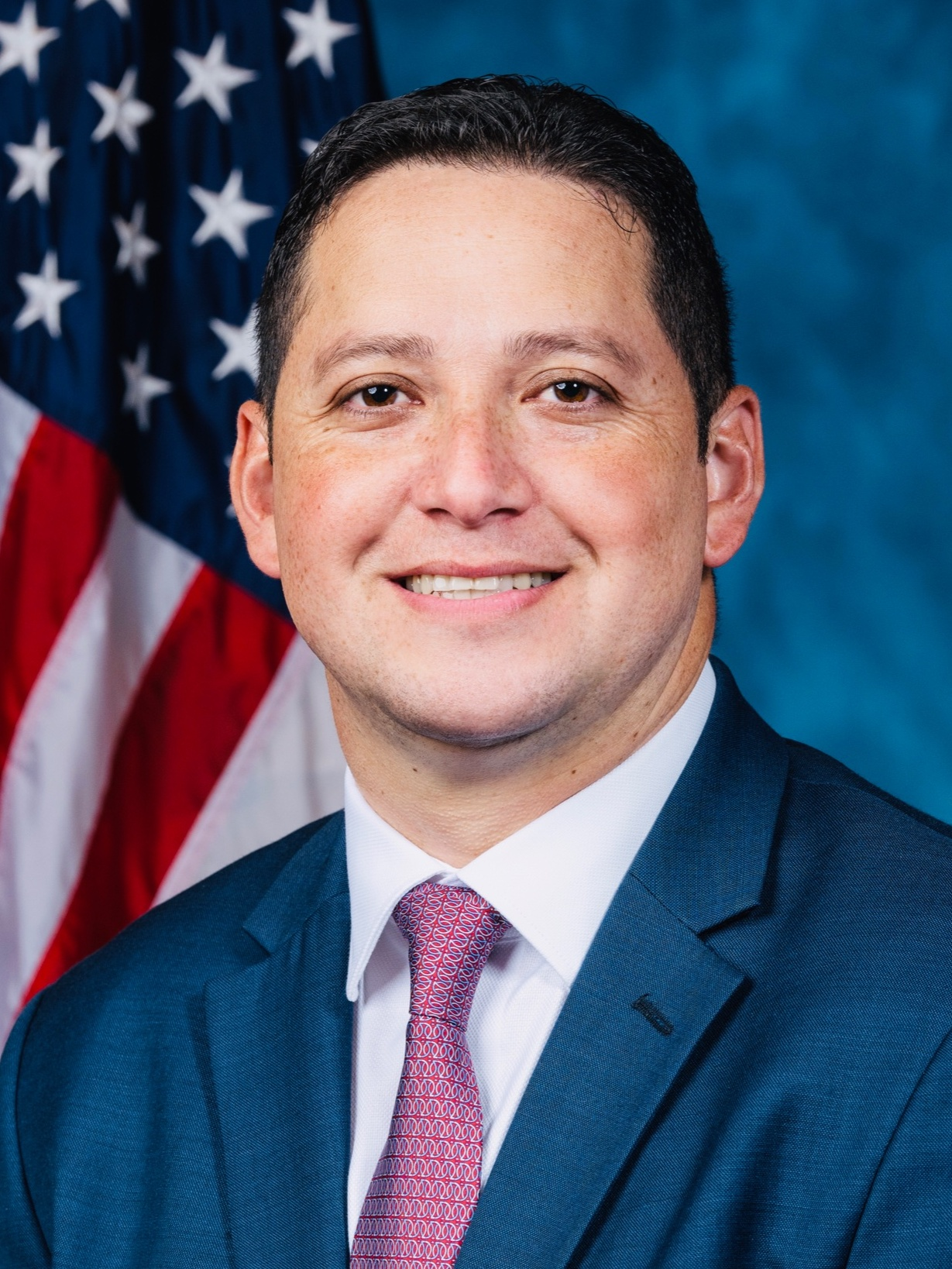

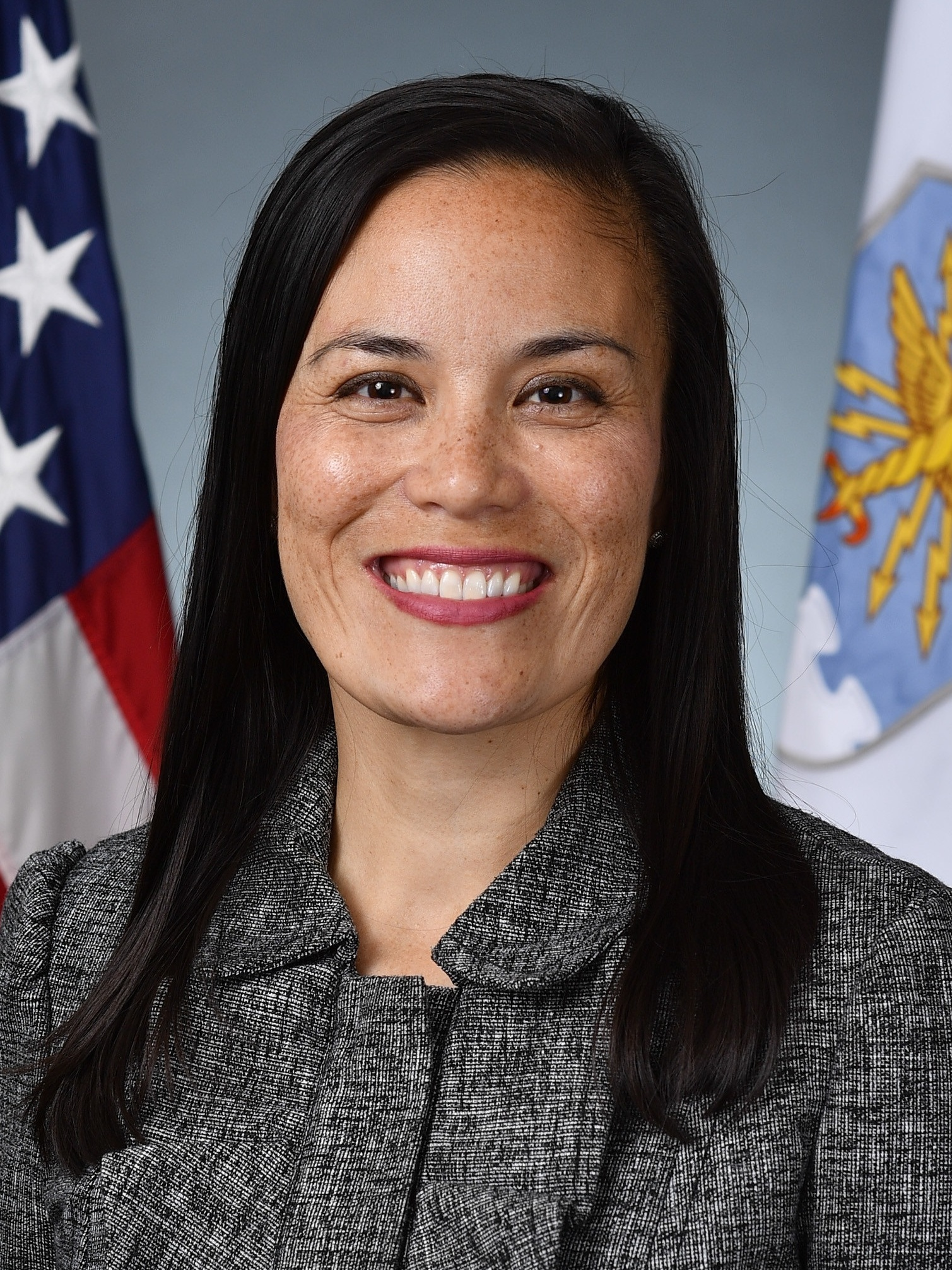
Nominee	Tony Gonzales	Gina Ortiz Jones
Party	Republican	Democratic
Popular vote	149,395	137,693
Percentage	50.6%	46.6%
- County results Gonzales: 40–50% 50–60% 60–70% 70–80% 80–90% Ortiz Jones: 40–50% 50–60% 60–70%
U.S. Representative before election
Will Hurd
Republican
Elected U.S. Representative
Tony Gonzales
Republican

The 23rd district covers southwestern Texas, including the Big Bend, the southern and western San Antonio suburbs, and the southwestern El Paso suburbs. The incumbent Republican Will Hurd, who was re-elected with 49.2% of the vote in 2018, subsequently announced he would not seek re-election on August 1, 2019.

=== Republican primary ===
==== Candidates ====
===== Nominee =====
- Tony Gonzales, U.S. Navy veteran

===== Eliminated in runoff =====
- Raul Reyes, U.S. Air Force veteran

===== Eliminated in primary =====
- Alma Arredondo-Lynch, dentist and candidate for Texas's 23rd congressional district in 2018
- Darwin Boedeker, gun show promoter
- Cecil Jones, businessman
- Jeff McFarlin, businessman
- Sharon Thomas, attorney and member of the Texas Commission on Law Enforcement
- Alia Ureste, candidate for Texas's 16th congressional district in 2018
- Ben Van Winkle, technology manager

===== Declined =====
- Pete Flores, state senator
- Will Hurd, incumbent U.S. representative
- JW Lown, former mayor of San Angelo

==== Endorsements ====
Tony Gonzales

Federal officials

- Dan Crenshaw, U.S. representative (TX-02)
- Phil Gramm, former U.S. senator from Texas (1985–2002) and U.S. representative (D-TX-06) (1979–1983) (R-TX-06) (1983–1985)
- Will Hurd, U.S. representative (R-TX-23)
- Kevin McCarthy, U.S. representative (CA-23) and House Minority Leader, former House Majority Leader (2014–2019) and House Minority Whip (2011–2014)
- Steve Scalise, U.S. representative (LA-01) and House Minority Whip, former House Majority Whip (2014–2019)
- Pete Sessions, former U.S. representative from (TX-05) (1997–2003) and (TX-32) (2003–2019)

Newspapers

- San Antonio Express-News
Raul Reyes

Federal officials

- Ted Cruz, U.S. senator from Texas

Organizations

- Gun Owners of America
- Texas Right to Life PAC
- Young Conservatives of Texas

==== Primary results ====
2020 Texas's 23rd congressional district Republican primary initial round results by county Gonzales: Gonzales—40–50%; Gonzales—30–40%; Reyes: Reyes—30–40%; Reyes—40–50%; Arredondo-Lynch: Arredondo-Lynch—<30%; Arredondo-Lynch—30–40%; Arredondo-Lynch—40–50%; McFarlin: McFarlin—<30%; Jones: Jones—<30%

Republican primary results
Party	Candidate	Votes	%
Republican	Tony Gonzales	11,522	28.1
Republican	Raul Reyes	9,555	23.3
Republican	Alma Arredondo-Lynch	5,391	13.2
Republican	Ben Van Winkle	4,427	10.8
Republican	Jeff McFarlin	4,241	10.3
Republican	Sharon Thomas	2,511	6.1
Republican	Cecil Jones	1,552	3.8
Republican	Alia Ureste	1,039	2.5
Republican	Darwin Boedeker	745	1.8
Total votes		40,983	100.0

==== Runoff results ====
Republican primary runoff results
Party	Candidate	Votes	%
Republican	Tony Gonzales	12,342	50.09
Republican	Raul Reyes	12,297	49.91
Total votes		24,639	100.0

=== Democratic primary ===
==== Candidates ====
===== Nominee =====
- Gina Ortiz Jones, U.S. Air Force veteran and nominee for Texas's 23rd congressional district in 2018

===== Eliminated in primary =====
- Rosalinda Ramos Abuabara, activist
- Jaime Escuder, attorney
- Ricardo Madrid, community health worker
- Efrain Valdez, former mayor of Del Rio and former Val Verde County judge

===== Declined =====
- Cesar Blanco, state representative

==== Endorsements ====
Gina Ortiz Jones

Federal politicians

- Gil Cisneros, U.S. representative (CA-39)
- Jason Crow, U.S. representative (CO-06)
- Katie Hill, former U.S. representative (CA-25)
- Chrissy Houlahan, U.S. representative (PA-06)
- Elaine Luria, U.S. representative (VA-02)
- Seth Moulton, U.S. representative (MA-06)
- Max Rose, U.S. representative (NY-11)
- Mikie Sherrill, U.S. representative (NJ-11)
- Elissa Slotkin, U.S. representative (MI-08)
- Abigail Spanberger, U.S. representative (VA-07)

State officials

- Diego Bernal, state representative
- Cesar Blanco, state representative
- Mary González, state representative
- Jason Kander, former secretary of state of Missouri (2013–2017) and Democratic nominee in 2016 United States Senate election in Missouri
- Ina Minjarez, state representative
- Poncho Nevárez, state representative

Local officials

- Pete Buttigieg, former mayor of South Bend, Indiana, 2020 presidential candidate

Labor unions

- AFT Texas
- CWA Local 6143
- Texas AFL-CIO

Newspapers

- San Antonio Express-News

Organizations

- CHC Bold PAC
- CPC PAC
- Democracy for America
- Democratic Congressional Campaign Committee
- EMILY's List
- End Citizens United
- Feminist Majority PAC
- Giffords PAC
- Human Rights Campaign
- J Street
- League of Conservation Voters Action Fund
- LGBTQ Victory Fund
- LPAC
- New Democrat Coalition
- People for the American Way
- Planned Parenthood Action Fund
- Stonewall Democrats of San Antonio
- VoteVets.org

==== Primary results ====
2020 Texas's 23rd congressional district Democratic primary results by county Jones: Jones—70–80%; Jones—60–70%; Jones—50–60%; Jones—40–50%

Democratic primary results
Party	Candidate	Votes	%
Democratic	Gina Ortiz Jones	41,718	66.4
Democratic	Efrain Valdez	6,964	11.1
Democratic	Rosalinda Ramos Abuabara	6,896	11.0
Democratic	Ricardo Madrid	4,518	7.2
Democratic	Jaime Escuder	2,725	4.3
Total votes		62,821	100.0

=== General election ===
==== Post-primary endorsements ====
Gina Ortiz Jones (D)

U.S. presidents

- Barack Obama, 44th president of the United States

U.S. vice presidents

- Joe Biden, 47th vice president of the United States and 2020 Democratic nominee for president

Federal politicians

- Julian Castro, former United States Secretary of Housing and Urban Development (2014–17), former mayor of San Antonio (2009–14), and former 2020 presidential candidate
- Kirsten Gillibrand, U.S. senator (D-NY)
- Elizabeth Warren, U.S. senator (D-MA)

Labor unions

- American Federation of Government Employees
- CWA District 6
- International Brotherhood of Teamsters
- United Association Local 142

Organizations

- Asian American Action Fund
- ASPIRE PAC
- Bend the Arc
- Brady Campaign
- Equality PAC
- Everytown for Gun Safety
- MoveOn
- NARAL
- Sierra Club

==== Predictions ====
Source	Ranking	As of
The Cook Political Report	Lean D (flip)	November 2, 2020
FiveThirtyEight	Lean D (flip)	November 2, 2020
Inside Elections	Tilt D (flip)	November 2, 2020
Sabato's Crystal Ball	Lean D (flip)	November 2, 2020
Politico	Lean D (flip)	November 2, 2020
Daily Kos	Lean D (flip)	November 2, 2020
RCP	Tossup	November 2, 2020
270toWin	Lean D (flip)	November 2, 2020

==== Polling ====
Poll source	Date(s) administered	Sample size	Margin of error	Tony Gonzales (R)	Gina Jones (D)	Beto Villela (L)	Undecided
Public Opinion Strategies (R) (Note: Poll conducted for the Gonzales campaign.)	October 3–5, 2020	400 (LV)	± 4.9%	41%	42%	3%	–
Public Opinion Strategies (R)	August 6–9, 2020	400 (RV)	± 4.9%	40%	41%	–	–
Remington Research Group (R)	May 19–20, 2020	669 (LV)	± 3.75%	43%	45%	–	12%

Hypothetical polling

with Generic Republican and Generic Democrat

Poll source	Date(s) administered	Sample size	Margin of error	Generic Republican	Generic Democrat	Undecided
Public Opinion Strategies (R)	August 6–9, 2020	400 (V)	± 4.9%	43%	47%	–
Public Policy Polling (D)	September 19–21, 2019	523 (LV) – 656 (LV)	± 3.8% – ± 4.2%	41%	53%	–

==== Results ====
Texas's 23rd congressional district, 2020
Party	Candidate	Votes	%
Republican	Tony Gonzales	149,395	50.6
Democratic	Gina Ortiz Jones	137,693	46.6
Libertarian	Beto Villela	8,369	2.8
Total votes		295,457	100.0
Republican hold			

== District 24 ==
2020 Texas's 24th congressional district election
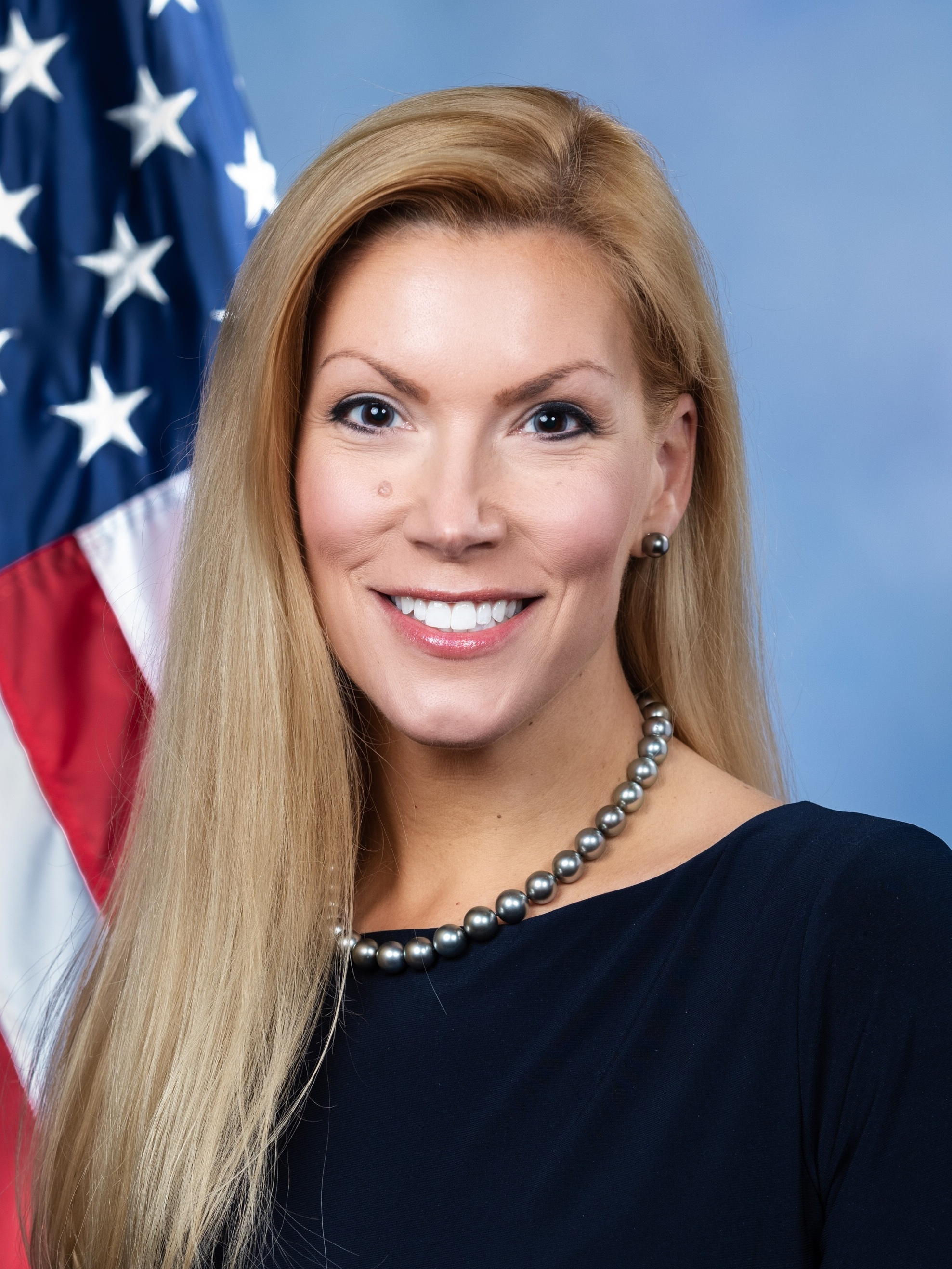

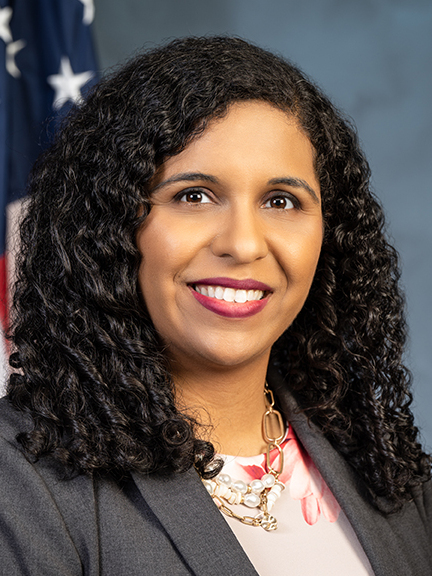
Nominee	Beth Van Duyne	Candace Valenzuela
Party	Republican	Democratic
Popular vote	167,910	163,326
Percentage	48.8%	47.5%
- County results Van Duyne: 50–60% Valenzuela: 50–60%
U.S. Representative before election
Kenny Marchant
Republican
Elected U.S. Representative
Beth Van Duyne
Republican

The 24th district encompasses the suburbs north of Fort Worth and Dallas, including Grapevine, Carrollton, parts of Irving, and northwestern Dallas. The incumbent was Republican Kenny Marchant, who was re-elected with 50.6% of the vote in 2018. Marchant announced he would not seek re-election on August 5, 2019.

In his place, Republicans nominated Beth Van Duyne, while Democrats nominated Candace Valenzuela.

=== Republican primary ===
==== Candidates ====
===== Nominee =====
- Beth Van Duyne, former U.S. Department of Housing and Urban Development official and former mayor of Irving

===== Eliminated in primary =====
- Sunny Chaparala, realtor
- David Fegan, property manager
- Jeron Liverman, realtor
- Desi Maes, U.S. Army Ranger veteran

===== Declined =====
- Konni Burton, former state senator
- Kenny Marchant, incumbent U.S. representative

==== Endorsements ====
Beth Van Duyne (R)

Executive officials

- Dan Crenshaw, congressman from Texas
- Nikki Haley, former United Nations Ambassador and former governor of South Carolina
- Kevin McCarthy, U.S. House Minority Leader from California
- Donald Trump, 45th president of the United States

Organizations

- Susan B. Anthony List

==== Primary results ====
Republican primary results
Party	Candidate	Votes	%
Republican	Beth Van Duyne	32,067	64.3
Republican	David Fegan	10,295	20.7
Republican	Desi Maes	2,867	5.7
Republican	Sunny Chaparala	2,808	5.6
Republican	Jeron Liverman	1,809	3.6
Total votes		49,846	100.0

=== Democratic primary ===
==== Candidates ====
===== Nominee =====
- Candace Valenzuela, former Carrollton-Farmers Branch school board member

===== Eliminated in runoff =====
- Kim Olson, retired Air Force Colonel, and nominee for Texas Commissioner of Agriculture in 2018

===== Eliminated in primary =====
- John Biggan, cognitive neuroscientist, teacher, and candidate for Texas's 24th congressional district in 2018
- Richard Fleming, former Carrollton-Farmers Branch school board trustee
- Jan McDowell, accountant and nominee for Texas's 24th congressional district in 2016 and 2018
- Sam Vega, art director

===== Withdrew =====
- Will Fisher, former candidate for Texas's 26th congressional district in 2018
- Crystal Fletcher, lawyer

==== Endorsements ====
Kim Olson

Federal politicians

- Gil Cisneros, U.S. representative (CA-39)
- Jason Crow, U.S. representative (CO-06)
- Chrissy Houlahan, U.S. representative (PA-06)
- Elaine Luria, U.S. representative (VA-02)
- Seth Moulton, U.S. representative (MA-06)
- Max Rose, U.S. representative (NY-11)
- Mikie Sherrill, U.S. representative (NJ-11)
- Elissa Slotkin, U.S. representative (MI-08)
- Abigail Spanberger, U.S. representative (VA-07)

Labor unions

- Texas AFL-CIO (also endorsed Candace Valenzuela)

Newspapers

- Dallas Morning News

Organizations

- Dallas Stonewall Democrats
- VoteVets
Candace Valenzuela

Federal politicians

- Veronica Escobar, U.S. representative (TX-16)
- Kamala Harris, U.S. senator (CA) and former candidate for the 2020 United States presidential election
- Elizabeth Warren, U.S. senator (MA) and former candidate for the 2020 United States presidential election

Labor unions

- Texas AFL-CIO (also endorsed Kim Olson)

Organizations

- ASPIRE PAC
- CHC Bold PAC
- CPC PAC
- EMILY's List

==== Polling ====
Poll source	Date(s) administered	Sample size	Margin of error	Crystal Fletcher	Jan McDowell	Kim Olson	Candace Valenzuela	Other
Bold PAC/The Hill (Note: Bold PAC is a campaigning arm of the Congressional Hispanic Caucus, which had endorsed Valenzuela prior to this poll's sampling period)	Released on October 28, 2019	– (V)	–	10% (Note: Standard VI response)	9%	12%	14%	–
Bold PAC/The Hill	Released on October 28, 2019	– (V)	–	– (Note: Response after pollster gives respondents Valenzuela's biography)	–	8%	29%	–

==== Primary results ====
Democratic primary results
Party	Candidate	Votes	%
Democratic	Kim Olson	24,442	41.0
Democratic	Candace Valenzuela	18,078	30.4
Democratic	Jan McDowell	5,965	10.0
Democratic	Crystal Fletcher (withdrawn)	3,386	5.7
Democratic	Richard Fleming	3,010	5.1
Democratic	Sam Vega	2,677	4.5
Democratic	John Biggan	1,996	3.4
Total votes		59,554	100.0

==== Polling ====
Poll source	Date(s) administered	Sample size	Margin of error	Kim Olson	Candace Valenzuela	Undecided
Data for Progress (D)	July 2–7, 2020	440 (LV)	± 4.7%	37%	52%	11%

==== Runoff results ====
Democratic primary runoff results
Party	Candidate	Votes	%
Democratic	Candace Valenzuela	20,003	60.4
Democratic	Kim Olson	13,131	39.6
Total votes		33,134	100.0

=== Third parties ===
==== Candidates ====
===== Declared =====
- Mark Bauer (independent), journalist
- Steve Kuzmich (independent), attorney

=== General election ===
==== Predictions ====
Source	Ranking	As of
The Cook Political Report	Lean D (flip)	November 2, 2020
FiveThirtyEight	Tossup	November 2, 2020
Inside Elections	Tilt D (flip)	November 2, 2020
Sabato's Crystal Ball	Lean D (flip)	November 2, 2020
Politico	Lean D (flip)	November 2, 2020
Daily Kos	Tossup	November 2, 2020
RCP	Tossup	November 2, 2020
270toWin	Lean D (flip)	November 2, 2020

==== Polling ====
Poll source	Date(s) administered	Sample size	Margin of error	Beth Van Duyne (R)	Candace Valenzuela (D)	Other/Undecided
Victoria Research & Consulting (D) (Note: Poll conduced for the House Majority Pac.)	July 31 – August 2, 2020	400 (LV)	± 4.9%	41%	47%	10% (Note: "Other" with 2% and Undecided with 8%)
RMG Research/Term Limits	July 27 – August 2, 2020	500 (RV)	± 4.5%	36%	36%	27%
DCCC Targeting and Analytics (D)	June 11–15, 2020	400 (LV)	± 4.4%	39%	45%	–

Hypothetical polling

with Generic Republican and Generic Democrat

Poll source	Date(s) administered	Sample size	Margin of error	Generic Republican	Generic Democrat	Other	Undecided
Victoria Research & Consulting (D)	July 31 – August 2, 2020	400 (LV)	± 4.9%	44%	46%	4% (Note: "Other/neither" with 4%)	6%
Public Policy Polling (D)	Sep 19–21, 2019	523 (LV) – 656 (LV)	± 3.8% – ± 4.2%	46%	47%	–	–

==== Post-primary endorsements ====
Candace Valenzuela (D)

Former U.S. presidents

- Barack Obama, 44th president of the United States

Former U.S. vice presidents

- Joe Biden, 47th vice president of the United States and 2020 Democratic nominee for president

Federal politicians

- Cory Booker, U.S. senator (NJ) and former candidate for the 2020 United States presidential election
- Joaquin Castro, U.S. representative (TX-20)
- Julian Castro, former United States Secretary of Housing and Urban Development (2014–17), former mayor of San Antonio (2009–14), and former 2020 United States presidential election
- Deb Haaland, U.S. representative (NM-1)
- Katie Hill, former U.S. representative (CA-25)
- Pramila Jayapal, U.S. representative (WA-07)
- Hakeem Jeffries, U.S. representative (NY-08)
- John Lewis, U.S. representative (GA-05) (deceased)
- Katie Porter, U.S. representative (CA-45)
- Ayanna Pressley, U.S. representative (MA-07)
- Marc Veasey, U.S. representative (TX-33)

State politicians

- Julie Johnson, state representative

Organizations

- CBC PAC
- End Citizens United
- Equality PAC
- Indivisible
- League of Conservation Voters Action Fund
- PODER PAC
- Sierra Club

==== Results ====
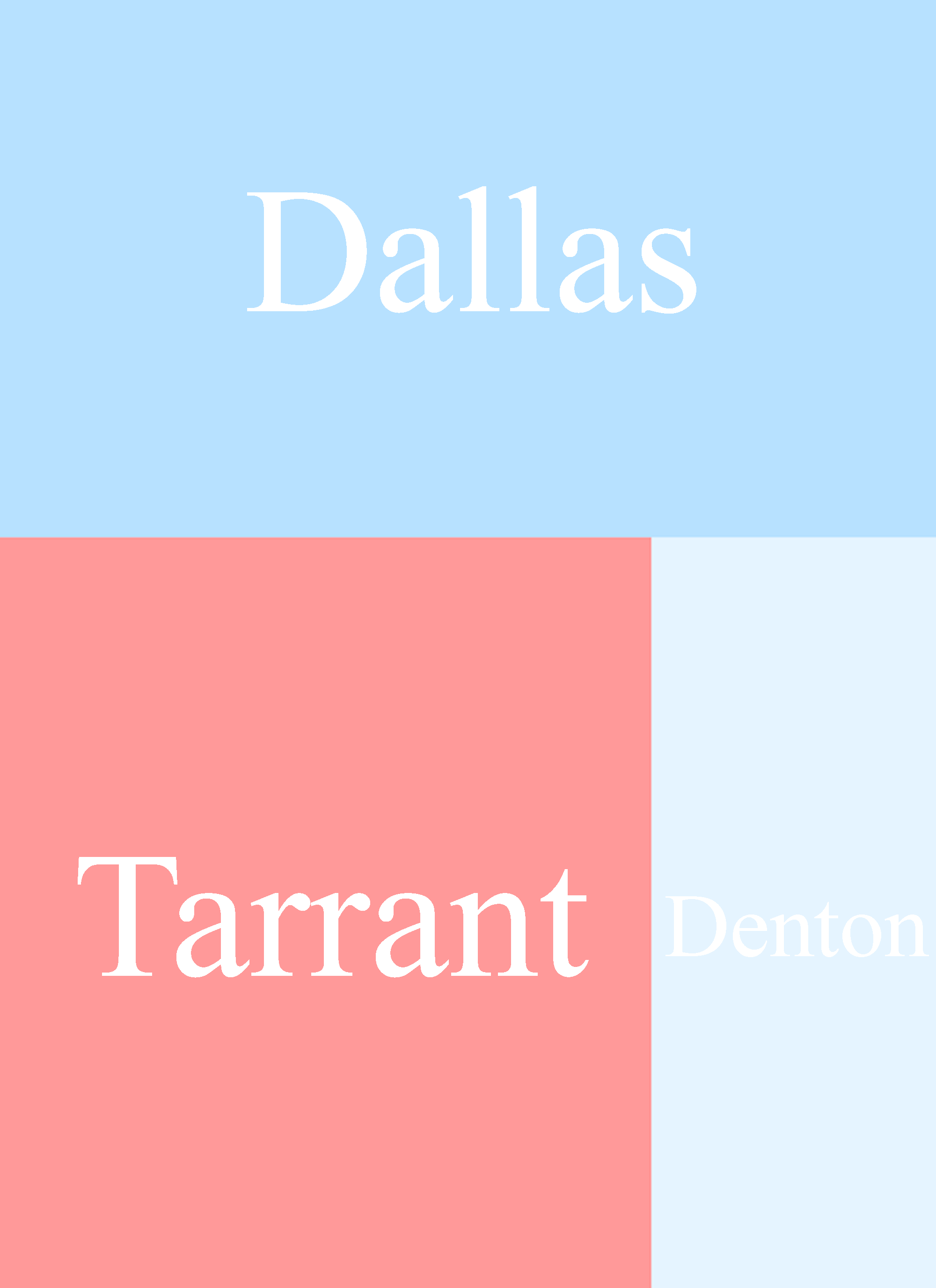
Cartogram of Texas' 24th congressional district

Texas's 24th congressional district, 2020
Party	Candidate	Votes	%
Republican	Beth Van Duyne	167,910	48.8
Democratic	Candace Valenzuela	163,326	47.5
Libertarian	Darren Hamilton	5,647	1.6
Independent	Steve Kuzmich	4,229	1.2
Independent	Mark Bauer	2,909	0.9
Total votes		344,021	100.0
Republican hold			

== District 25 ==
2020 Texas's 25th congressional district election
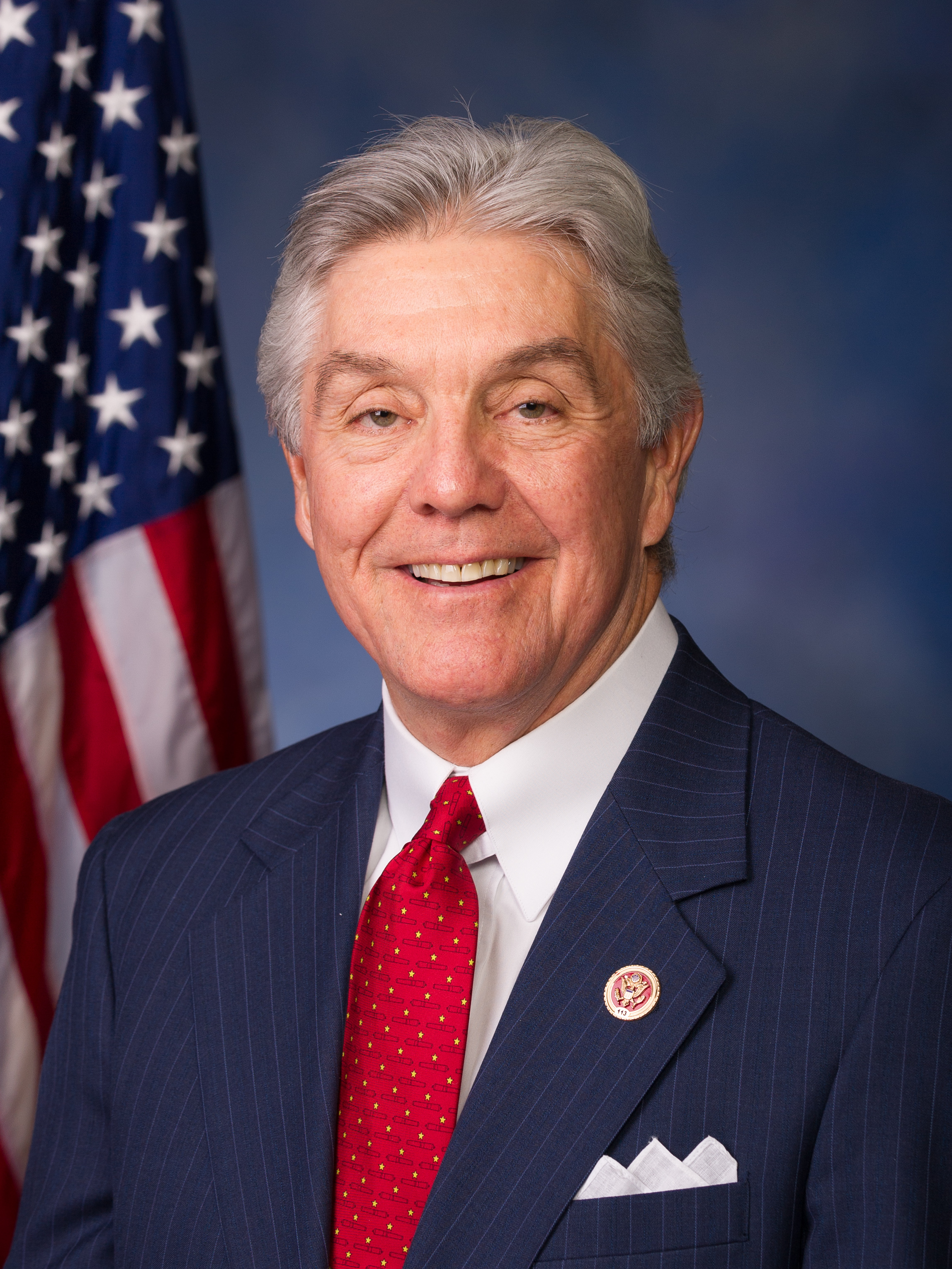

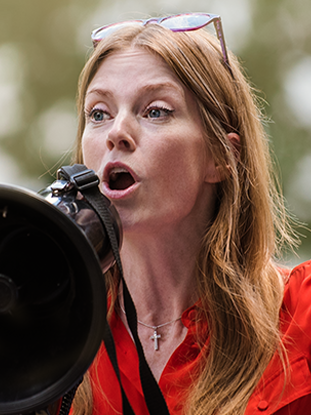
Nominee	Roger Williams	Julie Oliver
Party	Republican	Democratic
Popular vote	220,088	165,697
Percentage	55.9%	42.1%
- County results Williams: 50–60% 60–70% 70–80% 80–90% Oliver: 60–70%
U.S. Representative before election
Roger Williams
Republican
Elected U.S. Representative
Roger Williams
Republican

The 25th district runs from north Austin through rural areas of Texas Hill Country northward into southern Fort Worth suburbs. The incumbent was Republican Roger Williams, who was re-elected with 53.5% of the vote in 2018.

=== Republican primary ===
==== Candidates ====
===== Nominee =====
- Roger Williams, incumbent U.S. representative

===== Eliminated in primary =====
- Keith Neuendorff, software engineer

==== Primary results ====
Republican primary results
Party	Candidate	Votes	%
Republican	Roger Williams (incumbent)	63,146	87.6
Republican	Keith Neuendorff	8,965	12.4
Total votes		72,111	100.0

=== Democratic primary ===
==== Candidates ====
===== Nominee =====
- Julie Oliver, health care advocate, attorney, and nominee for Texas's 25th congressional district in 2018

===== Eliminated in primary =====
- Heidi Sloan, community organizer and farmer

==== Endorsements ====
Julie Oliver (D)

Federal officials

- Julian Castro, former U.S. Secretary of Housing and Urban Development in the Obama administration, mayor of San Antonio, and 2020 Democratic presidential candidate

Publications

- The Austin Chronicle
Heidi Sloan (D)

Labor unions

- AFSCME Local 1624
- Texas AFL-CIO (co-endorsement with Julie Oliver)

Organizations

- Democratic Socialists of America
- People's Policy Project

==== Primary results ====
Democratic primary results
Party	Candidate	Votes	%
Democratic	Julie Oliver	56,151	69.6
Democratic	Heidi Sloan	24,512	30.4
Total votes		80,663	100.0

=== General election ===
==== Post-election endorsements ====
Julie Oliver (D)

Executive branch officials

- Joe Biden, former vice president (2009–2017) and Democratic nominee for president in 2020

U.S. senators

- Kirsten Gillibrand, junior senator from New York and former 2020 presidential candidate
- Bernie Sanders, junior senator from Vermont and former 2020 presidential candidate
- Elizabeth Warren, senior senator from Massachusetts and former 2020 presidential candidate

U.S. representatives

- Lloyd Doggett (TX-35)
- Veronica Escobar (TX-16)
- Pramila Jayapal (WA-07)
- Ro Khanna (CA-17)
- Katie Porter (CA-45)
- Ayanna Pressley (MA-07)
- Marc Veasey (TX-33)

State officials

- Vikki Goodwin, Texas House of Representatives
- Jim Hightower, former Texas Agriculture Commissioner
- Gina Hinojosa, Texas House of Representatives
- Donna Howard, Texas House of Representatives
- Celia Israel, Texas House of Representatives

Individuals

- Stacey Abrams, former Georgia gubernatorial candidate and founder of Fair Fight
- Jamaal Bowman, 2020 Democratic nominee for New York's 16th congressional district
- Paige Ellis, Austin City Council member
- Jimmy Flanagan, Austin City Council member
- Julie Ann Hitsch, ACC Trustee
- Ora Houston, former Austin City Council member
- Nelson Linder, president of the NAACP's Austin chapter
- Laura Moser, activist and U.S. Congressional candidate
- Beto O'Rourke, former U.S. representative for Texas's 16th congressional district, nominee for the U.S. Senate in 2018 and former 2020 presidential election candidate
- Abdul El-Sayed, former Detroit Health Director and Michigan gubernatorial candidate in 2018
- Cristina Tzintzún Ramirez, U.S. Senate candidate in 2020 and labor organizer

Organizations

- Austin Environmental Democrats
- Austin Tejano Democrats
- Black Austin Democrats
- Blue America
- Capital Area Progressive Democrats
- Central Austin Democrats
- Circle C Area Democrats
- Clean Water Action
- Demand Universal Healthcare
- Democrats With Disabilities
- Emgage
- End Citizens United
- Farm and Ranch Freedom Alliance
- Indivisible
- Liberal Austin Democrats
- March For Our Lives
- Moms Demand Action
- National Women's Political Caucus
- NorthEast Travis County Democrats
- NXNW Democrats
- Our Revolution
- Planned Parenthood Action Fund
- Progress Texas
- Progressive Caucus
- Progressive Turnout Project
- Sierra Club
- Stonewall Democrats of Austin
- Sunrise Movement
- Town Hall Project
- Common Defense
- Vote Mama PAC
- West Austin Democrats
- Wimberley Indivisible
- Workers Defense Action Fund
- Working Families Party

Labor unions

- AFL-CIO Texas
- American Federation of Teachers Texas
- Tarrant County Central Labor Council

Publications

- Austin American-Statesman

==== Predictions ====
Source	Ranking	As of
The Cook Political Report	Likely R	November 2, 2020
FiveThirtyEight	Likely R	November 2, 2020
Inside Elections	Likely R	November 2, 2020
Sabato's Crystal Ball	Likely R	November 2, 2020
Politico	Lean R	November 2, 2020
Daily Kos	Likely R	November 2, 2020
RCP	Likely R	November 2, 2020
270toWin	Likely R	November 2, 2020

==== Polling ====
Poll source	Date(s) administered	Sample size	Margin of error	Roger Williams (R)	Julie Oliver (D)	Undecided
EMC Research (D) (Note: Poll conducted for Oliver's campaign.)	September 2–5, 2020	400 (LV)	± 4.9%	43%	41%	–
Remington Research Group (R) (Note: Poll sponsored by Williams' campaign)	September 1–2, 2020	810 (LV)	± 3.5%	52%	40%	8%
DCCC Targeting and Analytics (D)	July 21–22, 2020	389 (LV)	± 4.97%	45%	43%	–

==== Results ====
Texas's 25th congressional district, 2020
Party	Candidate	Votes	%
Republican	Roger Williams (incumbent)	220,088	55.9
Democratic	Julie Oliver	165,697	42.1
Libertarian	Bill Kelsey	7,738	2.0
Total votes		393,523	100.0
Republican hold			

== District 26 ==
2020 Texas's 26th congressional district election
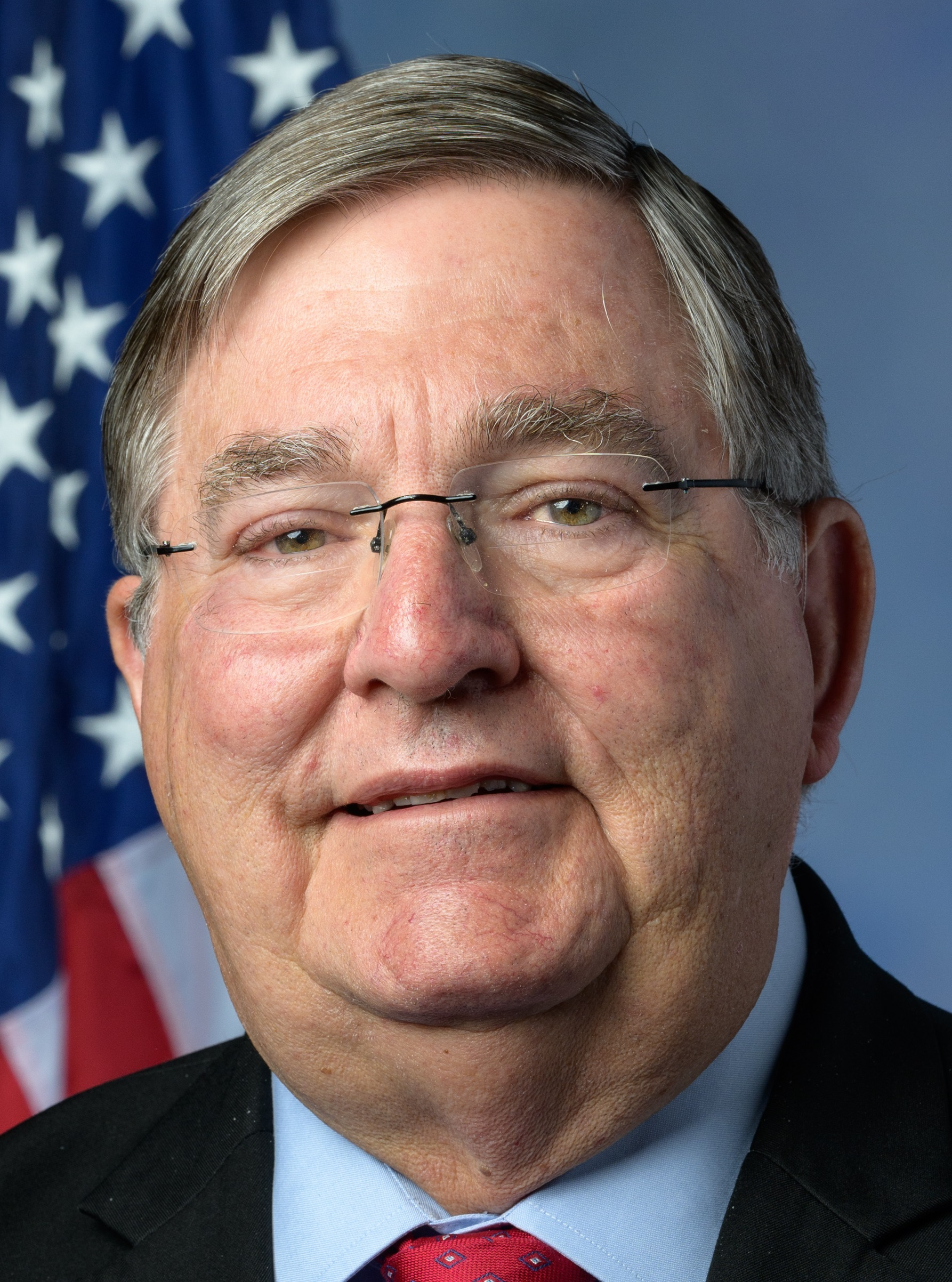

Nominee	Michael C. Burgess	Carol Iannuzzi
Party	Republican	Democratic
Popular vote	261,963	161,009
Percentage	60.6%	37.3%
U.S. Representative before election
Michael C. Burgess
Republican
Elected U.S. Representative
Michael C. Burgess
Republican

The 26th district is based in the northern portion of the Dallas–Fort Worth metroplex, centering on Denton County. The incumbent was Republican Michael C. Burgess, who was re-elected with 59.4% of the vote in 2018.

=== Republican primary ===
==== Candidates ====
===== Nominee =====
- Michael C. Burgess, incumbent U.S. representative

===== Eliminated in primary =====
- Michael Armstrong, pastor
- Jason Mrochek, U.S. Army veteran and founder of the Patriot Coalition
- Jack Wyman, former member of the Maine House of Representatives (1977-1981)

==== Primary results ====
Republican primary results
Party	Candidate	Votes	%
Republican	Michael C. Burgess (incumbent)	51,312	73.6
Republican	Jack Wyman	7,816	11.2
Republican	Michael Armstrong	5,745	8.2
Republican	Jason Mrochek	4,846	7.0
Total votes		69,719	100.0

=== Democratic primary ===
==== Candidates ====
===== Nominee =====
- Carol Iannuzzi, activist

===== Eliminated in primary =====
- Neil Durrance, former Denton city councilman and nominee for Texas's 26th congressional district in 2010
- Mat Pruneda, financial analyst, former candidate for Texas House District 64 in 2018

==== Primary results ====
Democratic primary results
Party	Candidate	Votes	%
Democratic	Carol Iannuzzi	31,019	55.3
Democratic	Mat Pruneda	15,701	28.0
Democratic	Neil Durrance	9,329	16.7
Total votes		56,049	100.0

=== General election ===
==== Predictions ====
Source	Ranking	As of
The Cook Political Report	Safe R	July 2, 2020
FiveThirtyEight	Solid R	October 13, 2020
Inside Elections	Safe R	June 2, 2020
Sabato's Crystal Ball	Safe R	July 2, 2020
Politico	Safe R	April 19, 2020
Daily Kos	Safe R	June 3, 2020
RCP	Safe R	June 9, 2020
270toWin	Safe R	June 7, 2020

==== Results ====
Texas's 26th congressional district, 2020
Party	Candidate	Votes	%
Republican	Michael C. Burgess (incumbent)	261,963	60.6
Democratic	Carol Iannuzzi	161,009	37.3
Libertarian	Mark Boler	9,243	2.1
Total votes		432,215	100.0
Republican hold			

== District 27 ==
2020 Texas's 27th congressional district election
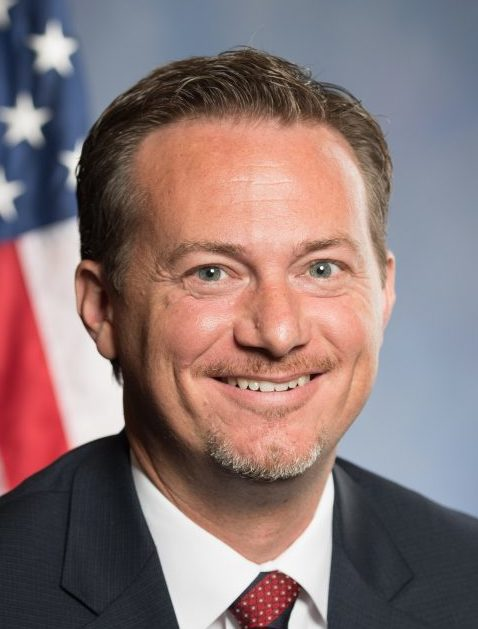

Nominee	Michael Cloud	Rick De La Fuente
Party	Republican	Democratic
Popular vote	172,305	95,446
Percentage	63.1%	34.9%
U.S. Representative before election
Michael Cloud
Republican
Elected U.S. Representative
Michael Cloud
Republican

The 27th district stretches across the Coastal Bend, from Corpus Christi up to Bay City. The incumbent was Republican Michael Cloud, who was re-elected with 60.3% of the vote in 2018.

=== Republican primary ===
==== Candidates ====
===== Nominee =====
- Michael Cloud, incumbent U.S. representative

==== Primary results ====
Republican primary results
Party	Candidate	Votes	%
Republican	Michael Cloud (incumbent)	60,945	100.0
Total votes		60,945	100.0

=== Democratic primary ===
==== Candidates ====
===== Nominee =====
- Ricardo "Rick" De La Fuente, businessman

===== Eliminated in primary =====
- Charlie Jackson, businessman

==== Primary results ====
2020 Texas's 27th congressional district Democratic primary results by county De La Fuente: De La Fuente—70–80%; De La Fuente—60–70%; De La Fuente—50–60%; Jackson: Jackson—50–60%

Democratic primary results
Party	Candidate	Votes	%
Democratic	Ricardo "Rick" De La Fuente	20,767	61.5
Democratic	Charlie Jackson	13,030	38.5
Total votes		33,797	100.0

=== Libertarian primary ===
==== Candidates ====
===== Declared =====
- Phil Gray, businessman

=== General election ===
==== Predictions ====
Source	Ranking	As of
The Cook Political Report	Safe R	July 2, 2020
FiveThirtyEight	Solid R	October 13, 2020
Inside Elections	Safe R	June 2, 2020
Sabato's Crystal Ball	Safe R	July 2, 2020
Politico	Safe R	April 19, 2020
Daily Kos	Safe R	June 3, 2020
RCP	Safe R	June 9, 2020
270toWin	Safe R	June 7, 2020

==== Results ====
Texas's 27th congressional district, 2020
Party	Candidate	Votes	%
Republican	Michael Cloud (incumbent)	172,305	63.1
Democratic	Ricardo "Rick" De La Fuente	95,466	34.9
Libertarian	Phil Gray	5,482	2.0
Total votes		273,253	100.0
Republican hold			

== District 28 ==
2020 Texas's 28th congressional district election
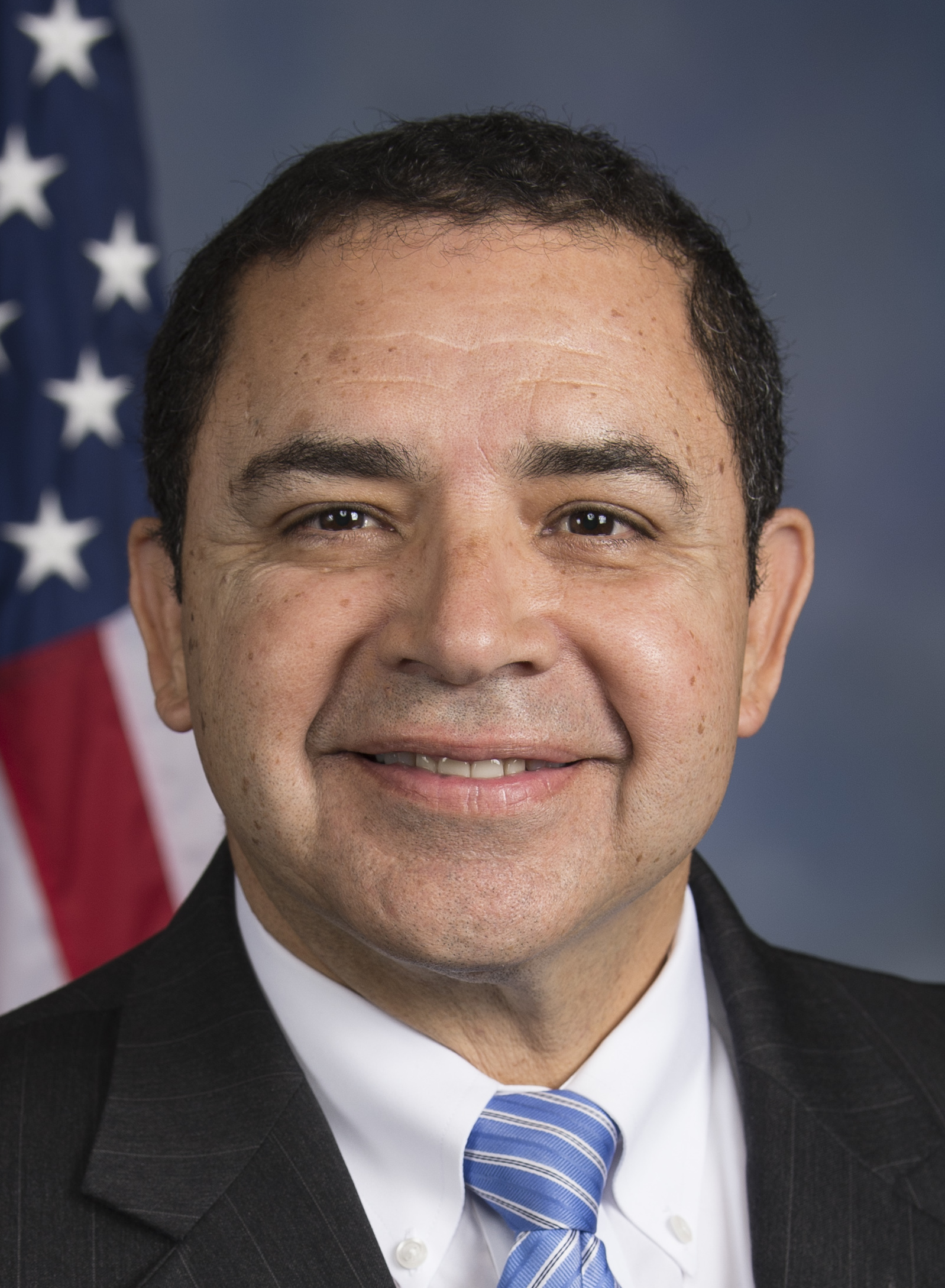

Nominee	Henry Cuellar	Sandra Whitten
Party	Democratic	Republican
Popular vote	137,494	91,925
Percentage	58.3%	39.0%
- County results Cuellar: 50–60% 60–70% 70–80% Whitten: 50–60% 60–70% 70–80%
U.S. Representative before election
Henry Cuellar
Democratic
Elected U.S. Representative
Henry Cuellar
Democratic

The 28th district is based in the Laredo area and stretches north of the Rio Grande Valley into east San Antonio. The incumbent was Democrat Henry Cuellar, who was re-elected with 84.4% of the vote in 2018 without major-party opposition.

=== Democratic primary ===
==== Candidates ====
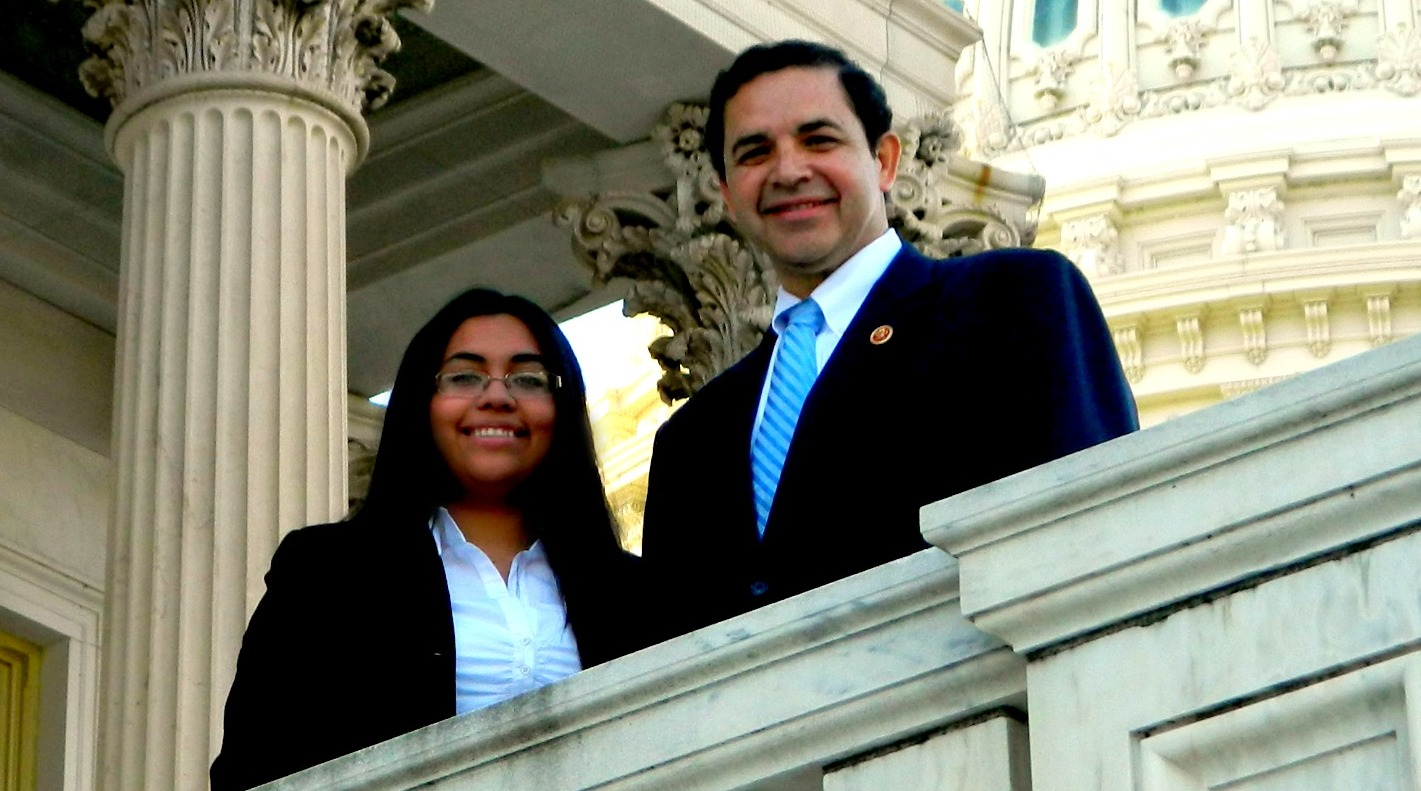
Jessica Cisneros and Henry Cuellar in 2013

===== Nominee =====
- Henry Cuellar, incumbent U.S. representative

===== Eliminated in primary =====
- Jessica Cisneros, attorney

==== Endorsements ====
Jessica Cisneros

Federal politicians

- Julián Castro, former Secretary of Housing and Urban Development (2014–2017) and former mayor of San Antonio
- Pramila Jayapal, U.S. representative
- Alexandria Ocasio-Cortez, U.S. representative
- Ayanna Pressley, U.S. representative
- Bernie Sanders, U.S. senator from Vermont
- Elizabeth Warren, U.S. senator from Massachusetts

Individuals

- Ezra Koenig, lead vocalist and guitarist for Vampire Weekend
- Tommy Vietor, co-founder and co-host of Pod Save America and Pod Save the World, and former senior Obama official

Labor unions

- Communications Workers of America District 6
- National Nurses United
- Texas AFL-CIO
- Texas American Federation of Teachers

Organizations

- 350 Action
- Daily Kos
- Democracy for America
- EMILY's List
- J Street PAC
- Justice Democrats
- League of Conservation Voters
- MoveOn.Org
- NARAL Pro-Choice America
- Planned Parenthood Action Fund
- Progressive Change Campaign Committee
- Progressive Democrats of America
- Sierra Club
- Sunrise Movement
- Texas Rising Action
- Working Families Party
Henry Cuellar

Federal politicians

- Cheri Bustos, U.S. representative and Democratic Congressional Campaign Committee Chairwoman
- Nancy Pelosi, Speaker of the United States House of Representatives

Labor unions

- Texas State Teachers Association

Organizations

- Americans for Prosperity Action
- BIPAC Action Fund
- Democratic Majority for Israel PAC
- LIBRE Initiative Action
- United States Chamber of Commerce

==== Primary results ====
Primary results by county Cuellar: 50–60%; 60–70%; 70–80%; Cisneros: 50–60%; 60–70%; Tie

Democratic primary results
Party	Candidate	Votes	%
Democratic	Henry Cuellar (incumbent)	38,834	51.8
Democratic	Jessica Cisneros	36,144	48.2
Total votes		74,978	100.0

=== Republican primary ===
==== Candidates ====
===== Nominee =====
- Sandra Whitten, Sunday school teacher

==== Primary results ====
Republican primary results
Party	Candidate	Votes	%
Republican	Sandra Whitten	20,656	100.0
Total votes		20,656	100.0

=== Third parties ===
==== Candidates ====
===== Declared =====
- Bekah Congdon, Libertarian nominee for Texas's 28th state senate district

=== General election ===
==== Predictions ====
Source	Ranking	As of
The Cook Political Report	Safe D	July 2, 2020
FiveThirtyEight	Solid D	October 13, 2020
Inside Elections	Safe D	June 2, 2020
Sabato's Crystal Ball	Safe D	July 2, 2020
Politico	Safe D	April 19, 2020
Daily Kos	Safe D	June 3, 2020
RCP	Safe D	June 9, 2020
270toWin	Safe D	June 7, 2020

==== Results ====
Texas's 28th congressional district, 2020
Party	Candidate	Votes	%
Democratic	Henry Cuellar (incumbent)	137,494	58.3
Republican	Sandra Whitten	91,925	39.0
Libertarian	Bekah Congdon	6,425	2.7
Total votes		235,844	100.0
Democratic hold			

== District 29 ==
2020 Texas's 29th congressional district election
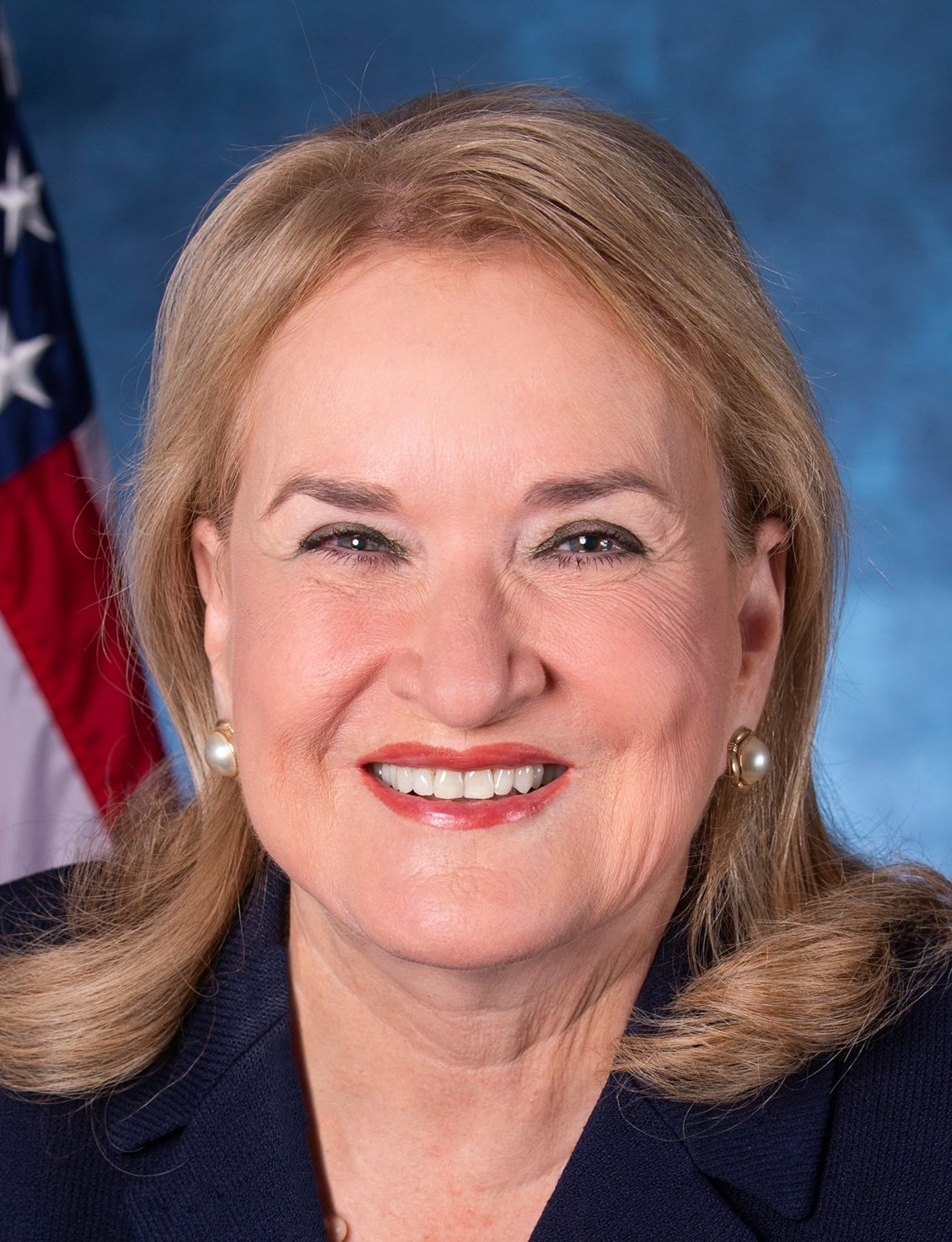

Nominee	Sylvia Garcia	Jaimy Z. Blanco
Party	Democratic	Republican
Popular vote	111,305	42,840
Percentage	71.1%	27.4%
- County results Garcia: 70–80%
U.S. Representative before election
Sylvia Garcia
Democratic
Elected U.S. Representative
Sylvia Garcia
Democratic

The 29th district encompasses parts of eastern Houston, taking in the heavily Latino areas of the city. The incumbent was Democrat Sylvia Garcia, who was elected with 75.1% of the vote in 2018.

=== Democratic primary ===
==== Candidates ====
===== Nominee =====
- Sylvia Garcia, incumbent U.S. representative

==== Primary results ====
Democratic primary results
Party	Candidate	Votes	%
Democratic	Sylvia Garcia (incumbent)	28,180	100.0
Total votes		28,180	100.0

=== Republican primary ===
==== Candidates ====
===== Nominee =====
- Jaimy Z. Blanco, real estate investor and candidate for Texas's 29th congressional district in 2018

===== Eliminated in primary =====
- Robert Schafranek, sales associate and candidate for Texas's 29th congressional district in 2016 and 2018

==== Primary results ====
Republican primary results
Party	Candidate	Votes	%
Republican	Jaimy Z. Blanco	4,336	56.9
Republican	Robert Schafranek	3,286	43.1
Total votes		7,622	100.0

=== General election ===
==== Predictions ====
Source	Ranking	As of
The Cook Political Report	Safe D	July 2, 2020
FiveThirtyEight	Solid D	October 13, 2020
Inside Elections	Safe D	June 2, 2020
Sabato's Crystal Ball	Safe D	July 2, 2020
Politico	Safe D	April 19, 2020
Daily Kos	Safe D	June 3, 2020
RCP	Safe D	June 9, 2020
270toWin	Safe D	June 7, 2020

==== Results ====
Texas's 29th congressional district, 2020
Party	Candidate	Votes	%
Democratic	Sylvia Garcia (incumbent)	111,305	71.1
Republican	Jaimy Z. Blanco	42,840	27.4
Libertarian	Phil Kurtz	2,328	1.5
Total votes		156,473	100.0
Democratic hold			

== District 30 ==
2020 Texas's 30th congressional district election
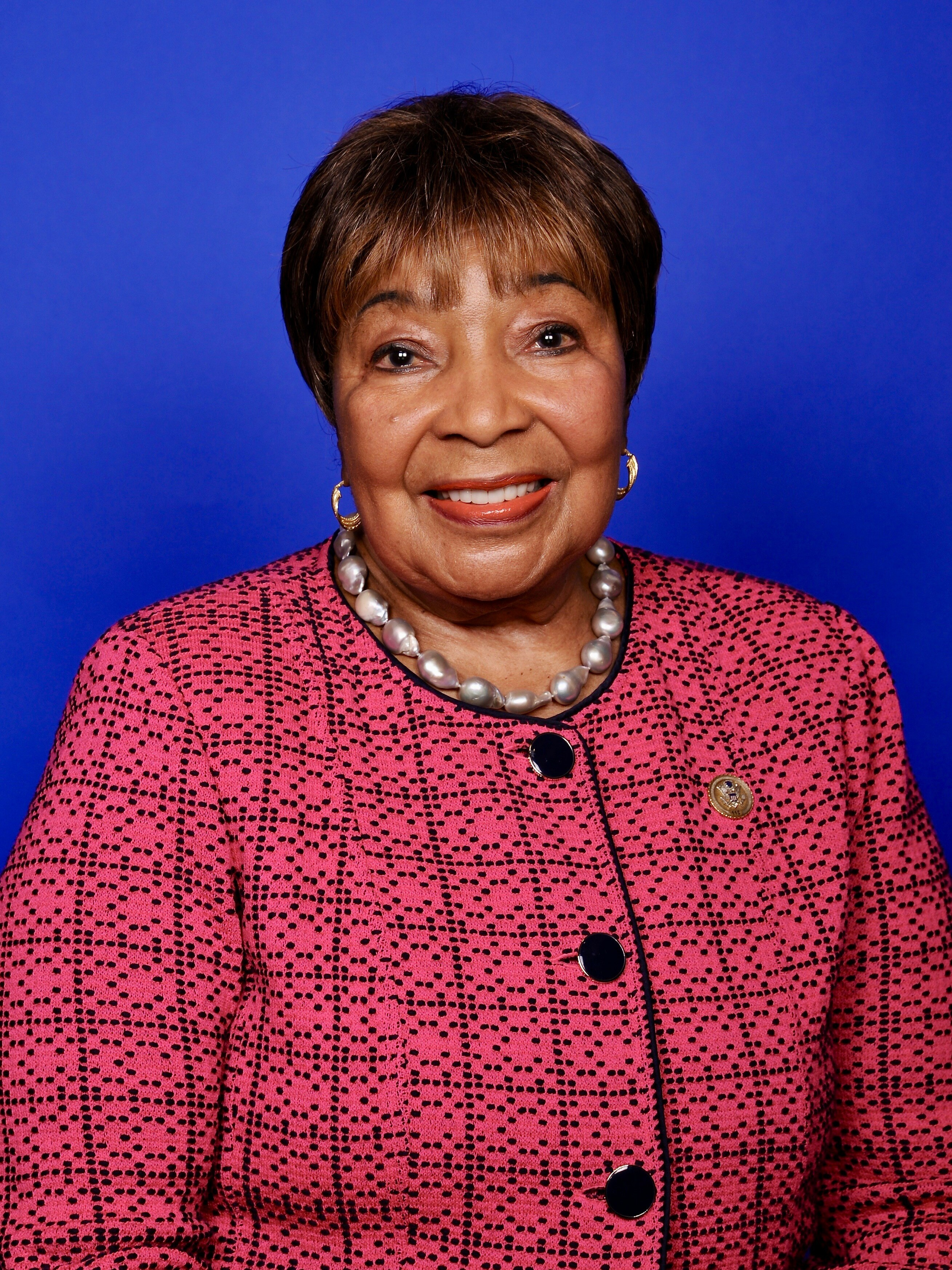

Nominee	Eddie Bernice Johnson	Tre Pennie
Party	Democratic	Republican
Popular vote	204,928	48,685
Percentage	77.5%	18.4%
- County results Johnson: 70–80%
U.S. Representative before election
Eddie Bernice Johnson
Democratic
Elected U.S. Representative
Eddie Bernice Johnson
Democratic

The 30th district encompasses Downtown Dallas as well as South Dallas. The incumbent was Democrat Eddie Bernice Johnson, who was re-elected with 91.1% of the vote in 2018 without major-party opposition.

=== Democratic primary ===
==== Candidates ====
===== Nominee =====
- Eddie Bernice Johnson, incumbent U.S. representative

===== Eliminated in primary =====
- Hasani Burton, activist
- Barbara Mallory Caraway, former state representative and perennial candidate
- Shenita Cleveland, community organizer

==== Primary results ====
Democratic primary results
Party	Candidate	Votes	%
Democratic	Eddie Bernice Johnson (incumbent)	58,804	70.6
Democratic	Shenita Cleveland	11,358	13.6
Democratic	Barbara Mallory Caraway	10,452	12.6
Democratic	Hasani Burton	2,638	3.2
Total votes		83,252	100.0

=== Republican primary ===
==== Candidates ====
===== Nominee =====
- Tre Pennie, Dallas police sergeant

==== Primary results ====
Republican primary results
Party	Candidate	Votes	%
Republican	Tre Pennie	9,928	100.0
Total votes		9,645	100.0

=== General election ===
==== Predictions ====
Source	Ranking	As of
The Cook Political Report	Safe D	July 2, 2020
FiveThirtyEight	Solid D	October 13, 2020
Inside Elections	Safe D	June 2, 2020
Sabato's Crystal Ball	Safe D	July 2, 2020
Politico	Safe D	April 19, 2020
Daily Kos	Safe D	June 3, 2020
RCP	Safe D	June 9, 2020
270toWin	Safe D	June 7, 2020

==== Results ====
Texas's 30th congressional district, 2020
Party	Candidate	Votes	%
Democratic	Eddie Bernice Johnson (incumbent)	204,928	77.5
Republican	Tre Pennie	48,685	18.4
Independent	Eric Williams	10,851	4.1
Total votes		264,464	100.0
Democratic hold			

== District 31 ==
2020 Texas's 31st congressional district election
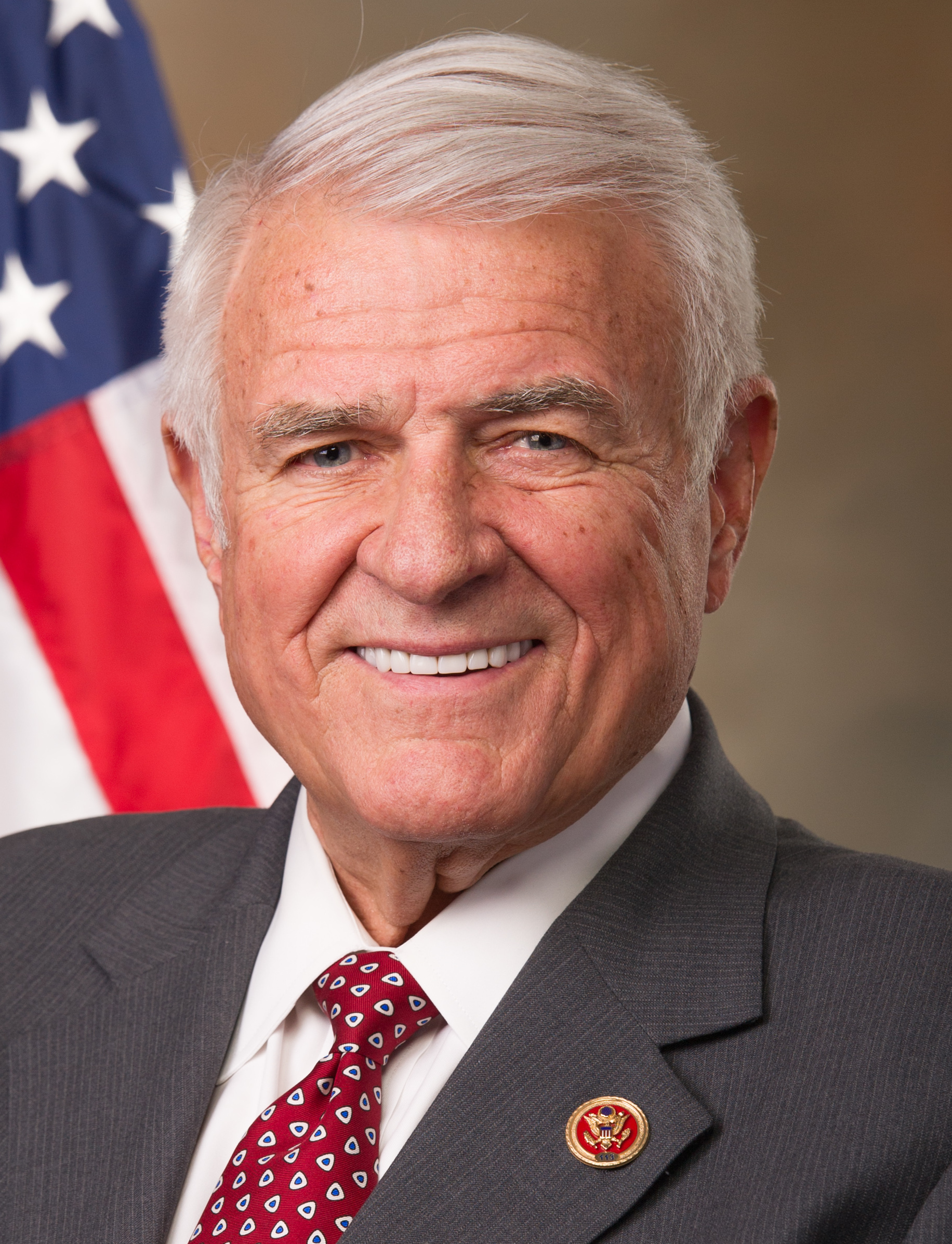

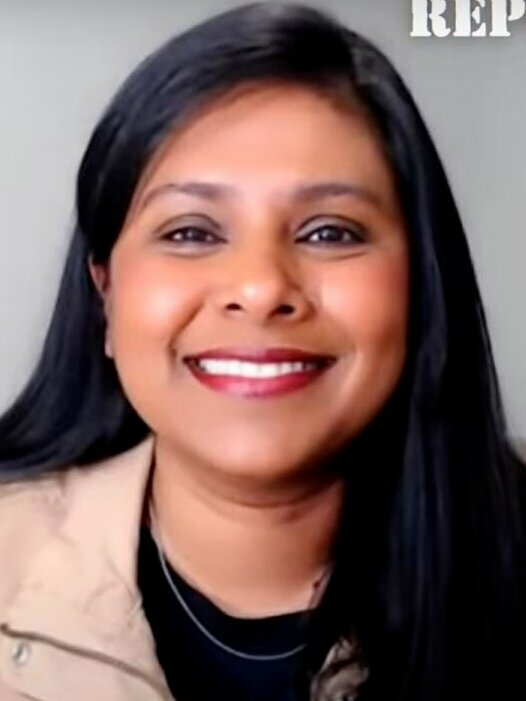
Nominee	John Carter	Donna Imam
Party	Republican	Democratic
Popular vote	212,695	176,293
Percentage	53.4%	44.3%
- County results Carter: 50–60%
U.S. Representative before election
John Carter
Republican
Elected U.S. Representative
John Carter
Republican

The 31st district encompasses northern Austin to Temple, including Williamson and Bell counties. The incumbent was Republican John Carter, who was re-elected with 50.6% of the vote in 2018.

=== Republican primary ===
==== Candidates ====
===== Nominee =====
- John Carter, incumbent U.S. representative

===== Eliminated in primary =====
- Abhiram Garapati, real estate investor
- Christopher Wall, police officer
- Mike Williams, retired firefighter

==== Primary results ====
Republican primary results
Party	Candidate	Votes	%
Republican	John Carter (incumbent)	53,070	82.3
Republican	Mike Williams	5,560	8.6
Republican	Christopher Wall	3,155	4.9
Republican	Abhiram Garapati	2,717	4.2
Total votes		64,502	100.0

=== Democratic primary ===
==== Candidates ====
===== Nominee =====
- Donna Imam, computer engineer

===== Eliminated in runoff =====
- Christine Eady Mann, family practice physician and candidate for Texas's 31st congressional district in 2018

===== Eliminated in primary =====
- Michael Edward Grimes, attorney
- Eric Hanke, singer-songwriter (endorsed Imam)
- Dan Janjigian, former Olympic bobsledder and actor (The Room) (endorsed Imam)
- Tammy Young, Round Rock city councilwoman (endorsed Imam)

===== Endorsements =====
Donna Imam

State officials

- Gonzalo Barrientos, former state senator (1985–2007) and state representative (1975–1985)
- Thresa Meza, state representative

==== Primary results ====
Democratic primary results
Party	Candidate	Votes	%
Democratic	Christine Eady Mann	24,145	34.7
Democratic	Donna Imam	21,352	30.7
Democratic	Tammy Young	9,956	14.3
Democratic	Michael Edward Grimes	7,542	10.8
Democratic	Eric Hanke	4,117	5.9
Democratic	Dan Janjigian	2,471	3.5
Total votes		69,583	100.0

==== Runoff results ====
Democratic primary runoff results
Party	Candidate	Votes	%
Democratic	Donna Imam	21,026	56.6
Democratic	Christine Eady Mann	16,109	43.4
Total votes		37,135	100.0

=== Third parties ===
==== Candidates ====
===== Declared =====
- Clark Patterson (Libertarian), photographer and videographer and candidate for Texas's 35th congressional district in 2018

===== Declined =====
- Trip Seibold (Libertarian), former software engineer (running for Texas State Board of Education district 10)

=== General election ===
==== Post-primary endorsements ====
John Carter (R)

Organizations

- National Right to Life Committee
- NRA Political Victory Fund
- Texas Alliance for Life
- United States Chamber of Commerce
Donna Imam (D)

Cabinet-level officials

- Julian Castro, former United States Secretary of Housing and Urban Development (2014–17), former mayor of San Antonio (2009–14), and former 2020 presidential candidate

Federal officials

- Lois Frankel, U.S. representative from FL-21
- Grace Meng, U.S. representative from NY-6
- Ilhan Omar, U.S. representative from MN-5
- Beto O'Rourke, former representative from TX-16 and former 2020 presidential candidate
- Bernie Sanders, Independent U.S. senator from Vermont and former 2016 and 2020 presidential candidate
- Elizabeth Warren, U.S. senator from Massachusetts and former 2020 presidential candidate

Organizations

- Asian American Action Fund
- End Citizens United

Labor unions

- AFGE
- AFSCME Local 1624
- CWA Local 6132
- IBEW
- NEA
- Texas AFL–CIO

Individuals

- Dan Janjigian, Armenian olympian and candidate in Texas' 31st Congressional district Democratic primary
- Little Joe, Tejano singer and Grammy Award winner
- Andrew Yang, 2020 presidential candidate and Ambassador for Entrepreneurship under President Obama

Newspapers and publications

- The Austin Chronicle

==== Predictions ====
Source	Ranking	As of
The Cook Political Report	Lean R	November 2, 2020
FiveThirtyEight	Likely R	November 2, 2020
Inside Elections	Safe R	November 2, 2020
Sabato's Crystal Ball	Likely R	November 2, 2020
Politico	Lean R	November 2, 2020
Daily Kos	Likely R	November 2, 2020
RCP	Likely R	November 2, 2020
270toWin	Likely R	November 2, 2020

==== Polling ====
Poll source	Date(s) administered	Sample size	Margin of error	John Carter (R)	Donna Imam (D)	Clark Patterson (L)	Jeremy Bravo (I)	Undecided
Public Policy Polling (D)	August 26–27, 2020	831 (V)	–	43%	37%	7%	3%	11%

Hypothetical polling

with Generic Democrat and Generic Republican

Poll source	Date(s) administered	Sample size	Margin of error	Generic Republican	Generic Democrat	Undecided
Public Policy Polling (D)	Sep 19–21, 2019	523 (LV) – 656 (LV)	± 3.8% – ± 4.2%	51%	44%	–

==== Results ====
Texas's 31st congressional district, 2020
Party	Candidate	Votes	%
Republican	John Carter (incumbent)	212,695	53.4
Democratic	Donna Imam	176,293	44.3
Libertarian	Clark Patterson	8,922	2.2
Independent	Johnathan Scott (write-in)	147	0.1
Total votes		398,057	100.0
Republican hold			

== District 32 ==
2020 Texas's 32nd congressional district election
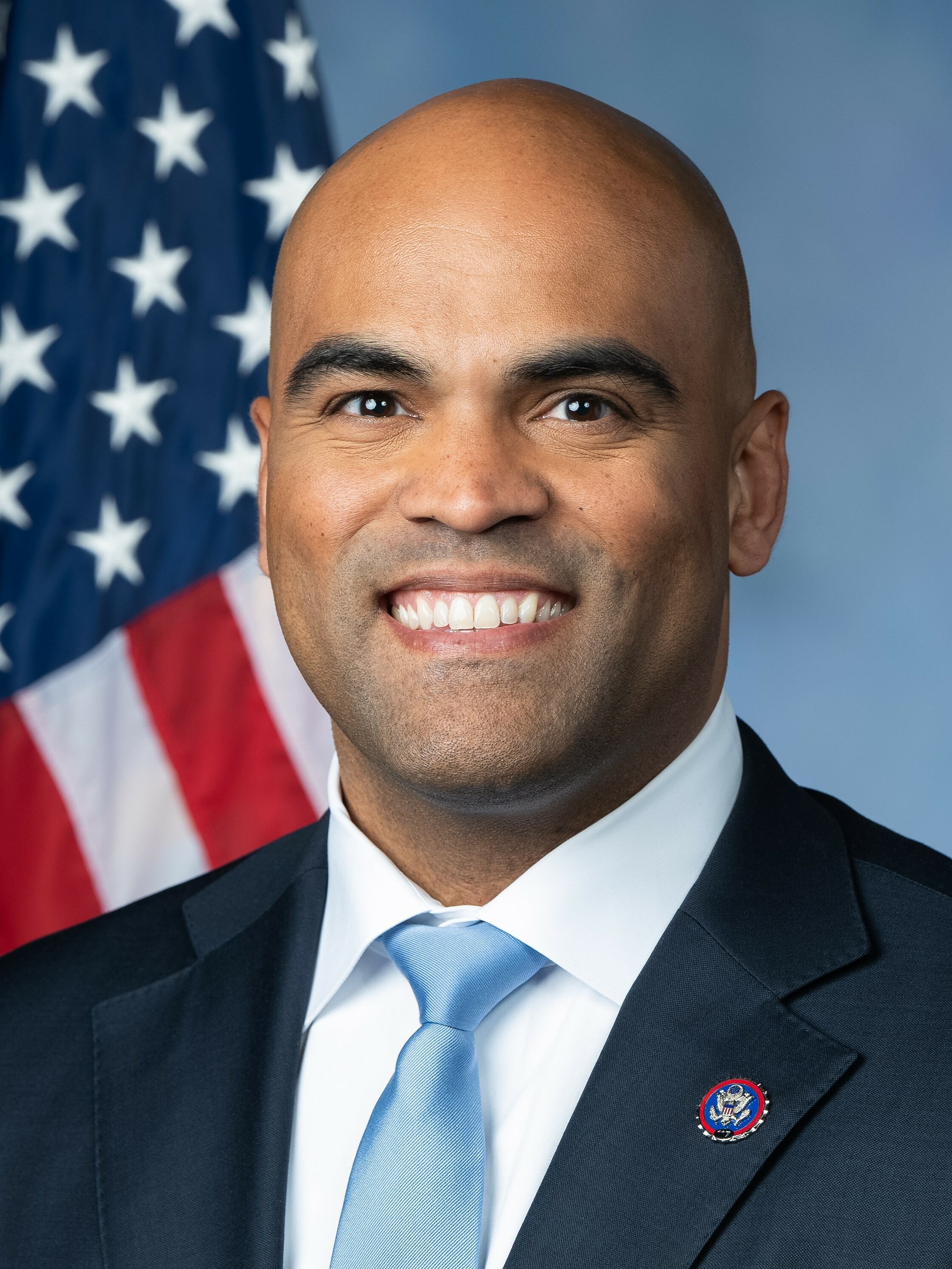

Nominee	Colin Allred	Genevieve Collins
Party	Democratic	Republican
Popular vote	178,542	157,867
Percentage	51.9%	45.9%
- County results Allred: 50–60% Collins: 50–60%
U.S. Representative before election
Colin Allred
Democratic
Elected U.S. Representative
Colin Allred
Democratic

The 32nd district covers northern and eastern Dallas and its inner northern suburbs. The incumbent was Democrat Colin Allred, who flipped the district and was elected with 52.3% of the vote in 2018.

=== Democratic primary ===
==== Candidates ====
===== Nominee =====
- Colin Allred, incumbent U.S. representative

==== Primary results ====
Democratic primary results
Party	Candidate	Votes	%
Democratic	Colin Allred (incumbent)	72,761	100.0
Total votes		72,761	100.0

=== Republican primary ===
==== Candidates ====
===== Nominee =====
- Genevieve Collins, business executive

===== Eliminated in primary =====
- Jon Hollis, film producer
- Floyd McLendon, executive aide to Texas Attorney General Ken Paxton, Legislative Fellow, and retired U.S. Navy SEAL
- Mark Sackett, structural engineer
- Jeff Tokar, technical contractor

===== Declined =====
- George Seay, businessman
- Pete Sessions, former U.S. representative for Texas's 32nd congressional district

===== Polling =====
Poll source	Date(s) administered	Sample size	Margin of error	Genevieve Collins	Floyd McLendon	Other	Undecided
0ptimus/Big Tree PAC	January 28–30, 2020	971 (LV)	± 3.3%	14% (Note: Including voters who lean towards a particular candidate)	10%	4% (Note: Tokar with 2%; Sackett and Hollis with 1%)	72%

==== Primary results ====
Republican primary results
Party	Candidate	Votes	%
Republican	Genevieve Collins	22,908	52.9
Republican	Floyd McLendon	14,699	33.9
Republican	Jon Hollis	1,945	4.5
Republican	Jeff Tokar	1,846	4.4
Republican	Mark Sackett	1,892	4.4
Total votes		43,324	100.0

=== Libertarian primary ===
==== Candidates ====
===== Declared =====
- Christy Mowrey, executive director of education

===== Eliminated at convention =====
- Ken Ashby, perennial candidate

=== Endorsements ===
Colin Allred (D)

U.S. presidents

- Barack Obama, 44th president of the United States

Organizations

- Black Economic Alliance
- Brady Campaign
- CHC BOLD PAC
- Congressional Black Caucus
- Council for a Livable World
- End Citizens United
- Everytown for Gun Safety
- Human Rights Campaign
- League of Conservation Voters Action Fund
- NARAL Pro-Choice America
- Planned Parenthood Action Fund
- Sierra Club
Genevieve Collins (R)

Organizations

- Maggie's List
- Susan B. Anthony List

=== General election ===
==== Predictions ====
Source	Ranking	As of
The Cook Political Report	Likely D	November 2, 2020
FiveThirtyEight	Likely D	November 2, 2020
Inside Elections	Safe D	November 2, 2020
Sabato's Crystal Ball	Likely D	November 2, 2020
Politico	Lean D	November 2, 2020
Daily Kos	Likely D	November 2, 2020
RCP	Lean D	November 2, 2020
270toWin	Likely D	November 2, 2020

==== Results ====
Texas's 32nd congressional district, 2020
Party	Candidate	Votes	%
Democratic	Colin Allred (incumbent)	178,542	51.9
Republican	Genevieve Collins	157,867	45.9
Libertarian	Christy Mowrey Peterson	4,946	1.4
Independent	Jason Sigmon	2,332	0.7
Total votes		343,687	100.0
Democratic hold			

== District 33 ==
2020 Texas's 33rd congressional district election
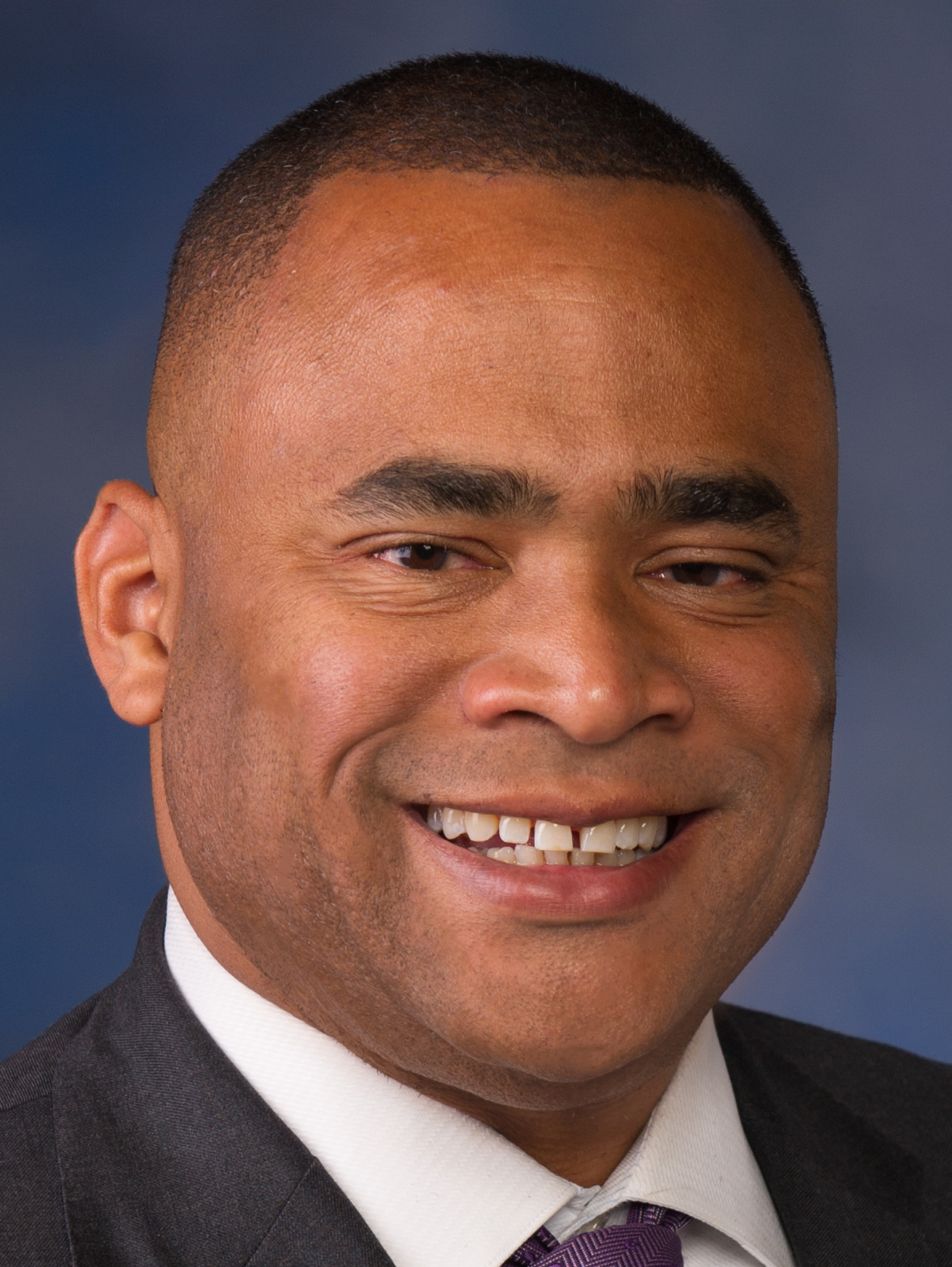

Nominee	Marc Veasey	Fabian Vasquez	Carlos Quintanilla
Party	Democratic	Republican	Independent
Popular vote	105,317	39,638	8,071
Percentage	66.8%	25.2%	5.1%
- County results Veasey: 60–70% 70–80%
U.S. Representative before election
Marc Veasey
Democratic
Elected U.S. Representative
Marc Veasey
Democratic

The 33rd district is located in the Dallas–Fort Worth metroplex, encompassing Downtown Fort Worth, western Dallas, and parts of Grand Prairie and Irving. The incumbent was Democrat Marc Veasey, who was re-elected with 76.2% of the vote in 2018.

=== Democratic primary ===
==== Candidates ====
===== Nominee =====
- Marc Veasey, incumbent U.S. representative

===== Eliminated in primary =====
- Sean Paul Segura, activist

==== Primary results ====
Democratic primary results
Party	Candidate	Votes	%
Democratic	Marc Veasey (incumbent)	23,869	63.6
Democratic	Sean Paul Segura	13,678	36.4
Total votes		37,547	100.0

=== Republican primary ===
==== Candidates ====
===== Nominee =====
- Fabian Vasquez, business manager

==== Primary results ====
Republican primary results
Party	Candidate	Votes	%
Republican	Fabian Vasquez	7,317	100.0
Total votes		7,317	100.0

=== General election ===
==== Predictions ====
Source	Ranking	As of
The Cook Political Report	Safe D	July 2, 2020
FiveThirtyEight	Solid D	October 13, 2020
Inside Elections	Safe D	June 2, 2020
Sabato's Crystal Ball	Safe D	July 2, 2020
Politico	Safe D	April 19, 2020
Daily Kos	Safe D	June 3, 2020
RCP	Safe D	June 9, 2020
270toWin	Safe D	June 7, 2020

==== Results ====
Texas's 33rd congressional district, 2020
Party	Candidate	Votes	%
Democratic	Marc Veasey (incumbent)	105,317	66.8
Republican	Fabian Vasquez	39,638	25.2
Independent	Carlos Quintanilla	8,071	5.1
Libertarian	Jason Reeves	2,586	1.6
Independent	Rene Welton	1,994	1.3
Total votes		157,606	100.0
Democratic hold			

== District 34 ==
2020 Texas's 34th congressional district election
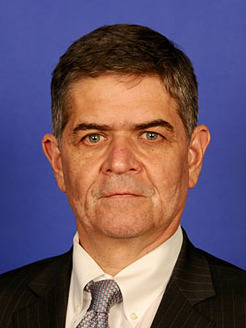

Nominee	Filemon Vela Jr.	Rey Gonzalez
Party	Democratic	Republican
Popular vote	111,439	84,119
Percentage	55.4%	41.9%
- County results Vela: 40–50% 50–60% 60–70% Gonzalez: 50–60% 60–70% 70–80% 80–90%
U.S. Representative before election
Filemon Vela Jr.
Democratic
Elected U.S. Representative
Filemon Vela Jr.
Democratic

The 34th district stretches from Brownsville in the Rio Grande Valley, northward into rural counties. The incumbent was Democrat Filemon Vela, who was elected with 60.0% of the vote in 2018.

=== Democratic primary ===
==== Candidates ====
===== Nominee =====
- Filemon Vela, incumbent U.S. representative

===== Eliminated in primary =====
- Osbert Rodriguez Haro III, health consultant
- Diego Zavala, high school teacher

==== Primary results ====
Democratic primary results
Party	Candidate	Votes	%
Democratic	Filemon Vela (incumbent)	39,484	75.1
Democratic	Diego Zavala	9,707	18.4
Democratic	Osbert Rodriguez Haro III	3,413	6.5
Total votes		52,604	100.0

=== Republican primary ===
==== Candidates ====
===== Nominee =====
- Rey Gonzalez, physician and nominee for Texas's 34th congressional district in 2016 and 2018

===== Eliminated in primary =====
- Rod Lingsch, pilot

==== Primary results ====
Republican primary results
Party	Candidate	Votes	%
Republican	Rey Gonzalez	10,665	56.3
Republican	Rod Lingsch	8,271	43.7
Total votes		18,936	100.0

=== General election ===
==== Predictions ====
Source	Ranking	As of
The Cook Political Report	Safe D	July 2, 2020
FiveThirtyEight	Solid D	October 13, 2020
Inside Elections	Safe D	June 2, 2020
Sabato's Crystal Ball	Safe D	July 2, 2020
Politico	Safe D	April 19, 2020
Daily Kos	Safe D	June 3, 2020
RCP	Safe D	June 9, 2020
270toWin	Safe D	June 7, 2020

==== Results ====
Texas's 34th congressional district, 2020
Party	Candidate	Votes	%
Democratic	Filemon Vela (incumbent)	111,439	55.4
Republican	Rey Gonzalez	84,119	41.9
Libertarian	Anthony Cristo	3,222	1.6
Independent	Chris Royal	2,235	1.1
Total votes		201,027	100.0
Democratic hold			

== District 35 ==
2020 Texas's 35th congressional district election
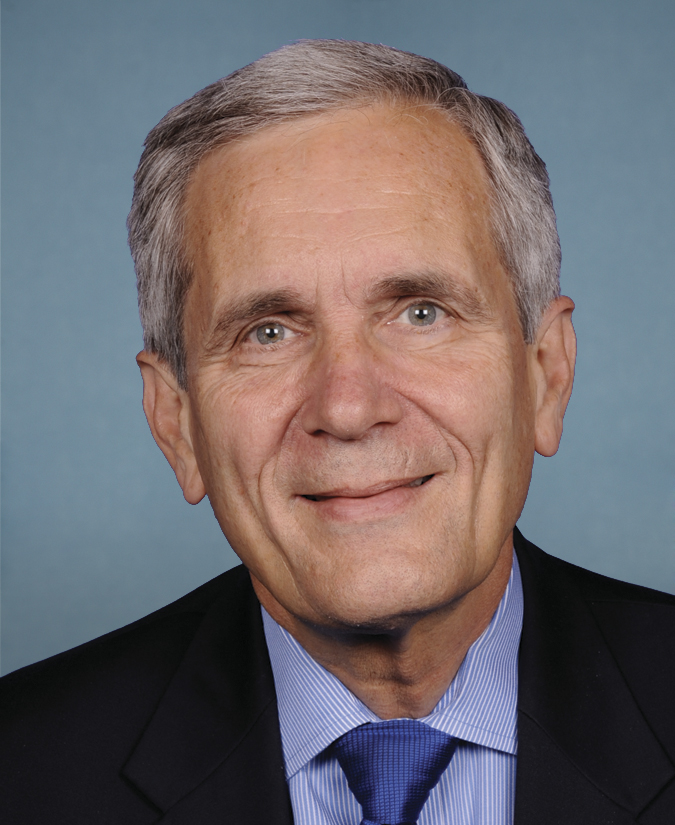

Nominee	Lloyd Doggett	Jennifer Garcia Sharon
Party	Democratic	Republican
Popular vote	176,373	80,795
Percentage	65.4%	30.0%
- County results Doggett: 50–60% 60–70% 70–80% Garcia Sharon: 50–60%
U.S. Representative before election
Lloyd Doggett
Democratic
Elected U.S. Representative
Lloyd Doggett
Democratic

The 35th district connects eastern San Antonio to southeastern Austin, through the I-35 corridor. The incumbent was Democrat Lloyd Doggett, who was re-elected with 71.3% in 2018.

=== Democratic primary ===
==== Candidates ====
===== Nominee =====
- Lloyd Doggett, incumbent U.S. representative

===== Eliminated in primary =====
- Rafael Alcoser, insurance broker

==== Primary results ====
2020 Texas's 35th congressional district Democratic primary results by county Doggett: Doggett—80–90%; Doggett—70–80%; Doggett—60–70%

Democratic primary results
Party	Candidate	Votes	%
Democratic	Lloyd Doggett (incumbent)	51,169	73.0
Democratic	Rafael Alcoser	18,922	27.0
Total votes		70,091	100.0

=== Republican primary ===
==== Candidates ====
===== Nominee =====
- Jennifer Garcia Sharon, volunteer caregiver

===== Eliminated in runoff =====
- William Hayward, ostrich farmer

===== Eliminated in primary =====
- Nick Moutos, attorney

==== Primary results ====
2020 Texas's 35th congressional district Republican primary initial round results by county Sharon: Sharon—40–50%; Sharon—30–40%; Hayward: Hayward—40–50%; Moutos: Moutos—30–40%

Republican primary results
Party	Candidate	Votes	%
Republican	Jennifer Garcia Sharon	6,751	37.1
Republican	William Hayward	6,237	34.3
Republican	Nick Moutos	5,200	28.6
Total votes		18,188	100.0

==== Runoff results ====
Republican primary runoff results
Party	Candidate	Votes	%
Republican	Jennifer Garcia Sharon	4,138	53.2
Republican	William Hayward	3,645	46.8
Total votes		7,783	100.0

=== General election ===
==== Predictions ====
Source	Ranking	As of
The Cook Political Report	Safe D	July 2, 2020
FiveThirtyEight	Solid D	October 13, 2020
Inside Elections	Safe D	June 2, 2020
Sabato's Crystal Ball	Safe D	July 2, 2020
Politico	Safe D	April 19, 2020
Daily Kos	Safe D	June 3, 2020
RCP	Safe D	June 9, 2020
270toWin	Safe D	June 7, 2020

==== Results ====
Texas's 35th congressional district, 2020
Party	Candidate	Votes	%
Democratic	Lloyd Doggett (incumbent)	176,373	65.4
Republican	Jennifer Garcia Sharon	80,795	30.0
Libertarian	Mark Loewe	7,393	2.7
Independent	Jason Mata	5,236	1.9
Total votes		269,797	100.0
Democratic hold			

== District 36 ==
2020 Texas's 36th congressional district election
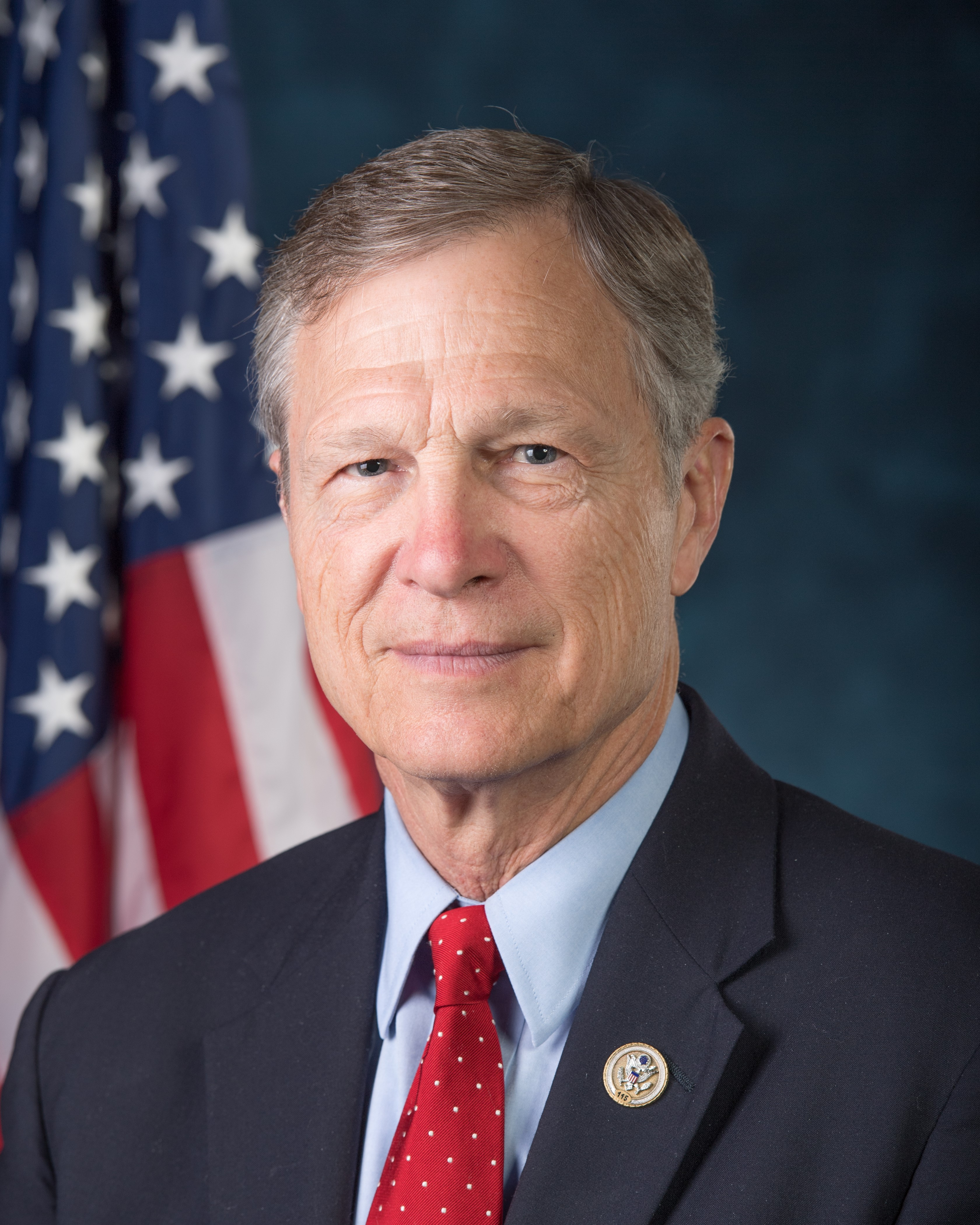

Nominee	Brian Babin	Rashad Lewis
Party	Republican	Democratic
Popular vote	222,712	73,148
Percentage	73.6%	24.3%
U.S. Representative before election
Brian Babin
Republican
Elected U.S. Representative
Brian Babin
Republican

The 36th district encompasses parts of Southeast Texas, including the Clear Lake region. The incumbent was Republican Brian Babin, who was re-elected with 72.6% of the vote in 2018.

=== Republican primary ===
==== Candidates ====
===== Nominee =====
- Brian Babin, incumbent U.S. representative

===== Eliminated in primary =====
- RJ Boatman, former chief of police and Federal Task Force director, municipal judge and business owner from Houston, TX

==== Primary results ====
Republican primary results
Party	Candidate	Votes	%
Republican	Brian Babin (incumbent)	75,277	89.6
Republican	RJ Boatman	8,774	10.4
Total votes		84,051	100.0

=== Democratic primary ===
==== Candidates ====
===== Nominee =====
- Rashad Lewis, former Jasper city councilman

==== Primary results ====
Democratic primary results
Party	Candidate	Votes	%
Democratic	Rashad Lewis	22,422	100.0
Total votes		22,422	100.0

=== General election ===
==== Predictions ====
Source	Ranking	As of
The Cook Political Report	Safe R	July 2, 2020
FiveThirtyEight	Solid R	October 13, 2020
Inside Elections	Safe R	June 2, 2020
Sabato's Crystal Ball	Safe R	July 2, 2020
Politico	Safe R	April 19, 2020
Daily Kos	Safe R	June 3, 2020
RCP	Safe R	June 9, 2020
270toWin	Safe R	June 7, 2020

==== Results ====
Texas's 36th congressional district, 2020
Party	Candidate	Votes	%
Republican	Brian Babin (incumbent)	222,712	73.6
Democratic	Rashad Lewis	73,148	24.3
Libertarian	Chad Abbey	4,848	1.6
Green	Hal Ridley Jr.	1,571	0.5
Total votes		302,549	100.0

== See also ==
- 2020 Texas elections

== Notes ==
Partisan clients
