= Kenny Marchant =

American politician (born 1951)

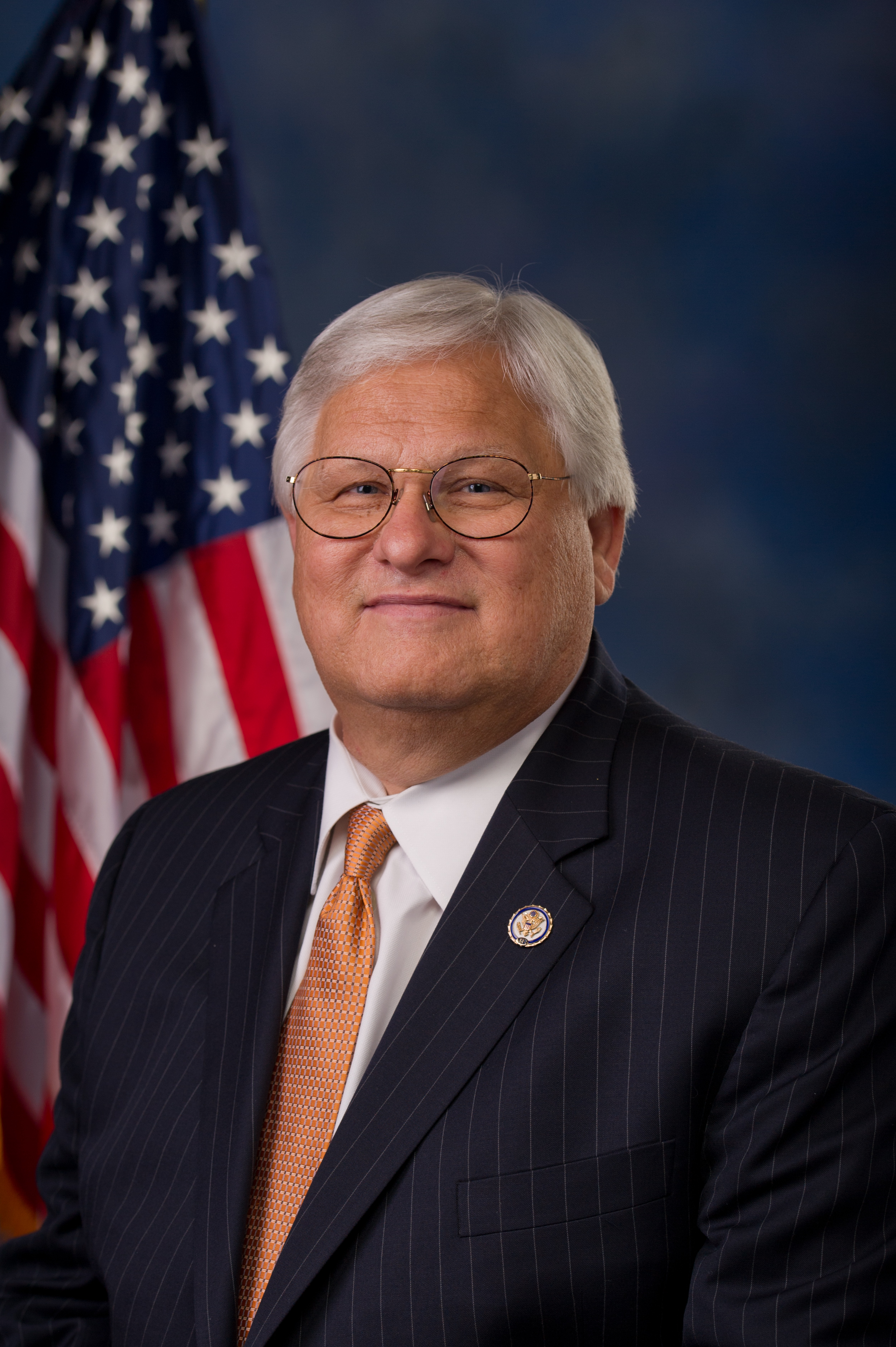
- Official portrait, 2012

Ranking Member of the House Ethics Committee
- In office January 3, 2019 – January 3, 2021
- Preceded by: Ted Deutch
- Succeeded by: Jackie Walorski

Member of the U.S. House of Representatives from Texas's 24th district
- In office January 3, 2005 – January 3, 2021
- Preceded by: Martin Frost
- Succeeded by: Beth Van Duyne

Member of the Texas House of Representatives
- In office January 13, 1987 – January 3, 2005
- Preceded by: William W. Blanton
- Succeeded by: Jim Jackson
- Constituency: 99th district (1987–2001); 115th district (2003–2005)

Personal details
- Born: Kenny Ewell Marchant; February 23, 1951 (age 75) Bonham, Texas, U.S.
- Party: Republican
- Spouse: Donna Marchant
- Children: 4
- Education: Southern Nazarene University (BA)
- Marchant's voice Marchant on the Tax Cuts and Jobs Act. Recorded December 19, 2017

Kenny Ewell Marchant (born February 23, 1951) is an American politician who served as the U.S. representative for Texas's 24th congressional district, from 2005 to 2021. A member of the Republican Party, he represented several areas around Dallas and Fort Worth.

On August 5, 2019, Marchant announced that he would not seek re-election to Congress in 2020. He was succeeded by fellow Republican Beth Van Duyne.

== Early life, education and career ==
Marchant was born in Bonham, Texas, but grew up in Carrollton, a Dallas suburb. He graduated from R.L. Turner High School in Carrollton and attended college at Southern Nazarene University (SNU) in Bethany, Oklahoma, at which he graduated with a Business Administration degree. He worked as a real estate developer and he owned a homebuilding company prior to entering politics.

Marchant served on the Carrollton City Council from 1980 to 1984, and was mayor of Carrollton from 1984 to 1986, both nonpartisan positions.

== Texas House of Representatives ==
He was a member of the Texas House of Representatives from 1987 to 2004. During three of his nine terms in the Texas House, Marchant served as chairman of the Committee on Financial Institutions. He pushed for legislation that reorganized the Texas Banking Code. In 2002, he was chosen as Chairman of the Texas House Republican Caucus. In 2004, he was named a Top Ten Legislator by Texas Monthly and Legislator of the Year by the Texas Municipal League.

== U.S. House of Representatives ==
=== Committee assignments ===
- Committee on Ways and Means
  - Subcommittee on Oversight
  - Subcommittee on Select Revenue Measures
- Committee on Ethics (Ranking Member)

Marchant was also a member of the Republican Study Committee, the Tea Party Caucus and the U.S.-Japan Caucus.

In the 110th Congress, Marchant served on the United States House Committee on Financial Services, Committee on Education and Labor, and Oversight and Government Reform Committee.

== Political positions ==
Marchant worked closely with Bush when he was governor of Texas, and bills himself as a staunch conservative. However, he has occasionally broken ranks with the GOP, as he did to increase the minimum wage. He has said that his top priority on Capitol Hill will be cutting the federal deficit with fiscal conservative policies. In 2017, he voted for the Tax Cuts and Jobs Act. Marchant expressed opposition to the proposed "Green New Deal" resolution in 2019, alleging that it would cost up to $93 trillion without having any effect on the global climate.

Marchant cosponsored legislation H.R. 1503 to amend the Federal Election Campaign Act of 1971 to require candidates for the presidency "to include with the campaign committee's statement of organization a copy of the candidate's birth certificate" plus supporting documentation. Introduced without the Republican leadership being informed, Florida Today commented that the bill "stems from fringe opponents of President Barack Obama who, during the 2008 election campaign, questioned whether Obama was born in Hawaii."

On December 18, 2019, Marchant voted against both articles of impeachment against Trump. Of the 195 Republicans who voted, all voted against both impeachment articles.

=== Texas v. Pennsylvania ===
In December 2020, Marchant was one of 126 Republican members of the House of Representatives who signed an amicus brief in support of Texas v. Pennsylvania, a lawsuit filed at the United States Supreme Court contesting the results of the 2020 presidential election, in which Joe Biden prevailed over incumbent Donald Trump. The Supreme Court declined to hear the case on the basis that Texas lacked standing under Article III of the Constitution to challenge the results of the election held by another state.

== Political campaigns ==
During the 2003 Texas redistricting, the 24th District, represented by 13-term Democrat Martin Frost, was reconfigured to be significantly more Republican. The old 24th had covered mostly Democratic areas around Dallas, Fort Worth, and Arlington. However, the reconfigured district shed its portions of Arlington and Fort Worth, replacing them with more suburban and Republican territory around Dallas. Had the district existed in 2000, George W. Bush would have won it with 68 percent of the vote.

Marchant ran for the redrawn district and was elected to Congress in 2004. He was reelected in 2006 (with 60% of the ballots cast) and 2008 (with 56% of the ballots cast). In 2014 he joined the newly founded Friends of Wales Caucus.

Marchant won his seventh term in the House in the general election held on November 8, 2016. With 154,845 votes (56.2 percent), he defeated Democrat Jan McDowell, who received 108,389 (39.3 percent). Two other candidates held the remaining 4.5 percent of the ballots cast.

Marchant narrowly won his eighth term in the House in the general election held on November 6, 2018. With 133,317 votes, 50.6%, with Democrat Jan McDowell receiving 125,231 votes, 47.5%. The margin of victory of 3.1% over his Democratic opponent was a marked reduction from the same campaign between the two in 2016, with a difference of 16.9% then. Libertarian Mike Kolls received 4,870 votes, 1.8%.

== Personal life ==
Marchant is married to Donna Marchant and has four children and seven grandchildren. They live in Coppell, a Dallas suburb. Marchant's son Matthew Marchant is a former mayor of Carrollton, Texas.

U.S. House of Representatives
Preceded by Martin Frost	Member of the U.S. House of Representatives from Texas's 24th congressional district 2005–2021	Succeeded by Beth Van Duyne
Preceded by Ted Deutch	Ranking Member of the House Ethics Committee; 2019–2021	Succeeded by Jackie Walorski
U.S. order of precedence (ceremonial)
Preceded by Mike Conaway as Former U.S. Representative	Order of precedence of the United States as Former U.S. Representative	Succeeded by Jim Nussle as Former U.S. Representative
