= Nathaniel Moran =

American politician (born 1974)

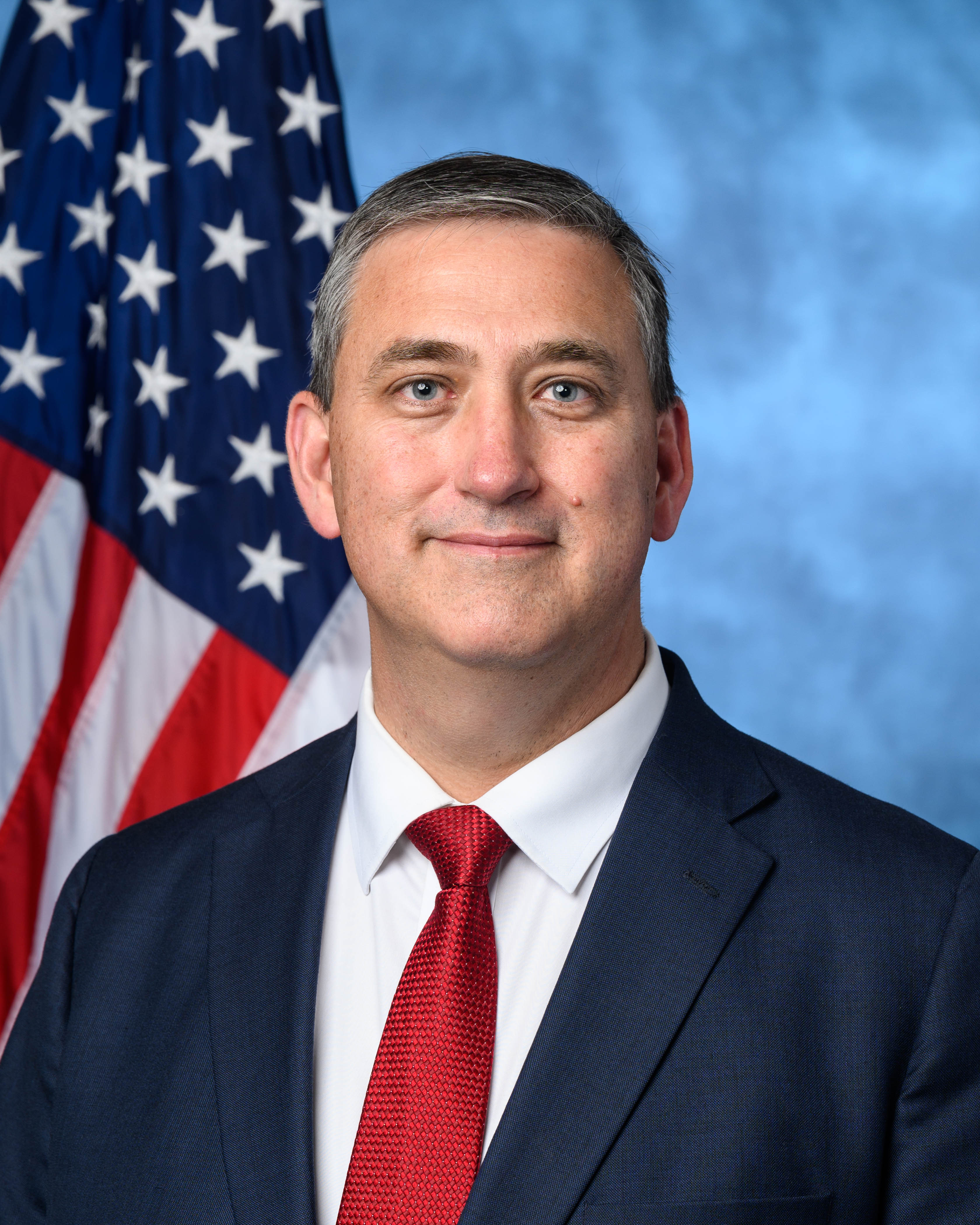
- Official portrait, 2023

Member of the U.S. House of Representatives from Texas's 1st district
- Incumbent
- Assumed office January 3, 2023
- Preceded by: Louie Gohmert

County Judge of Smith County
- In office July 22, 2016 – November 9, 2022
- Preceded by: Joel Baker
- Succeeded by: Neal Franklin

Personal details
- Born: Nathaniel Quentin Moran; September 23, 1974 (age 52) Arizona, U.S.
- Party: Republican
- Spouse: Kyna (m. 1999)
- Children: 4
- Education: United States Military Academy (attended); Texas Tech University (BA, MBA, JD)
- Website: House website Campaign website

Nathaniel Quentin Moran (born September 23, 1974) is an American politician and attorney who has served as the U.S. representative for Texas's 1st congressional district since 2023. A member of the Republican Party, he previously served as a member of the Tyler, Texas city council from the 5th district and as the county judge of Smith County, Texas.

== Early life and education ==
Nathaniel Quentin Moran was born as a twin on September 23, 1974, to Marjorie McCall and Dale E. Moran in Arizona. His parents moved to Smith County, Texas, to create a bible college. His father later served on the city council and as mayor of Whitehouse, Texas. He traveled to Russia as a part of the People to People International 1992. He graduated from Whitehouse High School in 1993.

Moran attended West Point for two years and graduated from Texas Tech University with a Bachelor of Arts degree in Russian, a Master of Business Administration, and a Juris Doctor. He worked as a teaching assistant in the Lubbock Independent School District. He married Kyna, with whom he had four children.

== Local politics ==
Moran was a member of the College Republicans, served as a precinct chair in the Republican Party, and attended county and state conventions as a delegate.

On February 17, 2005, Moran filed to run for the Tyler, Texas, city council from the 5th district. The incumbent, Ron Shaffer, was term-limited. He defeated Von Johnson after raising $2,439 and spending $3,209. He announced his reelection campaign on February 8, 2007, and faced no opposition. He served until 2009, when he resigned as his family moved to Houston for his son to attend a special school following the loss of his hearing.

Joel Baker, the Smith County Judge, was suspended in June 2016, after being indicted on three counts of violating the Texas Open Meetings Act. On July 19, the Smith County Commissioners Court voted unanimously to replace Baker with Moran, who was sworn in as the acting county judge on July 22. Baker resigned on November 4. Moran defeated Democratic nominee Michael Mast in the 2018 election. He was a member of the Smith County Election Commission. Moran resigned on November 9, 2022, after his election to Congress, and Neal Franklin was selected to replace him.

== U.S. House of Representatives ==
=== Elections ===
==== 2022 ====
Representative Louie Gohmert announced that he would run for the Republican nomination for Texas Attorney General instead of reelection in Texas's 1st congressional district. On December 2, 2021, Moran announced his campaign to succeed Gohmert. He won the Republican nomination and defeated Democratic nominee Jrmar Jefferson.

=== Tenure ===
Moran was among the 71 Republicans who voted against final passage of the Fiscal Responsibility Act of 2023 in the House.

=== Committee assignments ===
For the 119th Congress:

- Committee on Ethics
- Committee on Ways and Means
  - Subcommittee on Oversight
  - Subcommittee on Social Security
  - Subcommittee on Work and Welfare
- Select Committee on the Strategic Competition between the United States and the Chinese Communist Party

=== Caucus memberships ===
- Republican Main Street Partnership

== Electoral history ==
2005 Tyler, Texas city council 5th district election
| Party | Candidate | Votes | % |
|---|---|---|---|
| Nonpartisan | Nathaniel Moran | 309 | 75.74 |
| Nonpartisan | Von Johnson | 99 | 24.26 |
| Total votes | | 408 | 100.00 |

2022 Texas's 1st congressional district election
Primary election
| Party | Candidate | Votes | % |
|---|---|---|---|
| Republican | Nathaniel Moran | 51,312 | 63.00 |
| Republican | Joe McDaniel II | 19,708 | 24.20 |
| Republican | Aditya Atholi | 6,186 | 7.60 |
| Republican | John Porro | 4,238 | 5.20 |
| Total votes | | 81,444 | 100.00 |
General election
| Republican | Nathaniel Moran | 183,224 | 78.08 |
| Democratic | Jrmar Jefferson | 51,438 | 21.92 |
| Total votes | | 234,662 | 100.00 |

2024 Texas's 1st congressional district election
Primary election
| Party | Candidate | Votes | % |
|---|---|---|---|
| Republican | Nathaniel Moran (incumbent) | 84,442 | 100.00 |
| Total votes | | 84,442 | 100.00 |
General election
| Republican | Nathaniel Moran (incumbent) | 258,523 | 100.00 |
| Total votes | | 258,523 | 100.00 |

== Works cited ==
- "Moran, Nathaniel". Biographical Directory of the United States Congress. Archived from the original on 10 January 2023.
- Hilburn, Jacque; Maynard, Roy (8 May 2005). "Moran Wins Big - Captures Victory In Council Race; Succeeds Shaffer". The Tyler Courier-Times. pp. 1, 6. OCLC 14248248. Archived from the original on 17 November 2022 – via Newspapers.com.
- "Texas First Congressional District Election Results". The New York Times. 30 November 2022. eISSN 1553-8095. ISSN 0362-4331. Archived from the original on 21 December 2022.

U.S. House of Representatives
| Preceded by Louie Gohmert | Member of the U.S. House of Representatives from Texas's 1st congressional district 2023–present | Incumbent |
U.S. order of precedence (ceremonial)
| Preceded by Cory Mills | United States representatives by seniority 338th | Succeeded by Jared Moskowitz |
