= Texas's 24th congressional district =

U.S. House district for Texas

Coordinates: 32°55′10″N 97°00′46″W

- Interactive map of district boundaries
- Representative: Beth Van Duyne; R–Irving
- Distribution: 99.89% urban; 0.11% rural
- Population (2025): 778,676
- Median household income: $120,656
- Ethnicity: 61.6% White; 17.5% Hispanic; 8.6% Asian; 7.0% Black; 4.3% Two or more races; 1.1% other
- Cook PVI: R+7

Texas' 24th congressional district of the United States House of Representatives covers much of the suburban area in between Fort Worth and Dallas in the state of Texas and centers along the Dallas–Tarrant county line.

The district has about 529,000 potential voters (citizens, age 18+). Of these, 57% are White, 16% Latino, 14% Black, and 10% Asian. Immigrants make up 4% of the district's potential voters. Median income among households (with one or more potential voter) in the district is about $81,900, and 46% hold a bachelor's or higher degree.

It is the wealthiest congressional district in the state of Texas.

== Recent election results from statewide races ==
=== 2023–2027 boundaries ===
Year	Office	Results
2008	President	McCain 66% - 34%
2012	President	Romney 70% - 30%
2014	Senate	Cornyn 74% - 26%
2014	Governor	Abbott 69% - 31%
2016	President	Trump 59% - 35%
2018	Senate	Cruz 57% - 42%
2018	Governor	Abbott 64% - 34%
2018	Lt. Governor	Patrick 58% - 39%
2018	Attorney General	Paxton 57% - 41%
2018	Comptroller of Public Accounts	Hegar 62% - 35%
2020	President	Trump 55% - 43%
2020	Senate	Cornyn 59% - 38%
2022	Governor	Abbott 58% - 41%
2022	Lt. Governor	Patrick 55% - 42%
2022	Attorney General	Paxton 55% - 41%
2022	Comptroller of Public Accounts	Hegar 61% - 37%
2024	President	Trump 57% - 41%
2024	Senate	Cruz 54% - 43%

=== 2027–2033 boundaries ===
Year	Office	Results
2008	President	McCain 66% - 34%
2012	President	Romney 70% - 30%
2014	Senate	Cornyn 74% - 26%
2014	Governor	Abbott 69% - 31%
2016	President	Trump 59% - 35%
2018	Senate	Cruz 57% - 42%
2018	Governor	Abbott 64% - 34%
2018	Lt. Governor	Patrick 58% - 39%
2018	Attorney General	Paxton 57% - 41%
2018	Comptroller of Public Accounts	Hegar 61% - 35%
2020	President	Trump 55% - 43%
2020	Senate	Cornyn 59% - 38%
2022	Governor	Abbott 58% - 41%
2022	Lt. Governor	Patrick 55% - 42%
2022	Attorney General	Paxton 55% - 41%
2022	Comptroller of Public Accounts	Hegar 61% - 37%
2024	President	Trump 57% - 41%
2024	Senate	Cruz 55% - 43%
2026	Senate	Talarico 50–47%
2026	Governor	Abbott 52–47%

== Composition ==
For the 118th and successive Congresses (based on redistricting following the 2020 census), the district contains all or portions of the following counties and communities:

Dallas County (10)

Addison (part; also 32nd), Carrollton (part; also 26th, 32nd, and 33rd; shared with Denton County), Coppell (part; also 26th; shared with Denton County), Dallas (part; also 3rd, 4th, 5th, 6th, 30th, 32nd, and 33rd; shared with Collin, Denton, Kaufman, and Rockwall counties), Farmers Branch (part; also 32nd and 33rd), Grapevine (shared with Denton and Tarrant counties), Highland Park, Lewisville (part; also 26th; shared with Denton County), Irving (part; also 6th and 33rd), Richardson (part; also 32nd; shared with Collin County), University Park

Tarrant County (14)

Bedford, Colleyville, Euless, Flower Mound (part; also 26th; shared with Denton County), Fort Worth (part; also 12th, 25th, 26th, and 33rd; shared with Denton, Johnson, Parker, and Wise counties), Grapevine (shared with Dallas and Denton counties), Haltom City (part; also 12th), Hurst, Keller, Roanoke (part; also 26th; shared with Denton County), Southlake (part; also 26th; shared with Denton County), Trophy Club (part; also 26th; shared with Denton County), Watauga, Westlake (part; also 26th; shared with Denton County)

== List of members representing the district ==
Member	Party	Years	Cong ress	Electoral history	District location
District established January 3, 1973
Dale Milford (Grand Prairie)	Democratic	January 3, 1973 – January 3, 1979	93rd 94th 95th	Elected in 1972. Re-elected in 1974. Re-elected in 1976. Lost renomination.	1973–1975 [data missing]
Dale Milford (Grand Prairie)	Democratic	January 3, 1973 – January 3, 1979	93rd 94th 95th	Elected in 1972. Re-elected in 1974. Re-elected in 1976. Lost renomination.	1975–1983 [data missing]
Martin Frost (Arlington)	Democratic	January 3, 1979 – January 3, 2005	96th 97th 98th 99th 100th 101st 102nd 103rd 104th 105th 106th 107th 108th	Elected in 1978. Re-elected in 1980. Re-elected in 1982. Re-elected in 1984. Re-elected in 1986. Re-elected in 1988. Re-elected in 1990. Re-elected in 1992. Re-elected in 1994. Re-elected in 1996. Re-elected in 1998. Re-elected in 2000. Re-elected in 2002. Redistricted to the 32nd district and lost re-election.	1975–1983 [data missing]
Martin Frost (Arlington)	Democratic	January 3, 1979 – January 3, 2005	96th 97th 98th 99th 100th 101st 102nd 103rd 104th 105th 106th 107th 108th	Elected in 1978. Re-elected in 1980. Re-elected in 1982. Re-elected in 1984. Re-elected in 1986. Re-elected in 1988. Re-elected in 1990. Re-elected in 1992. Re-elected in 1994. Re-elected in 1996. Re-elected in 1998. Re-elected in 2000. Re-elected in 2002. Redistricted to the 32nd district and lost re-election.	1983–1985 [data missing]
Martin Frost (Arlington)	Democratic	January 3, 1979 – January 3, 2005	96th 97th 98th 99th 100th 101st 102nd 103rd 104th 105th 106th 107th 108th	Elected in 1978. Re-elected in 1980. Re-elected in 1982. Re-elected in 1984. Re-elected in 1986. Re-elected in 1988. Re-elected in 1990. Re-elected in 1992. Re-elected in 1994. Re-elected in 1996. Re-elected in 1998. Re-elected in 2000. Re-elected in 2002. Redistricted to the 32nd district and lost re-election.	1985–1993 [data missing]
Martin Frost (Arlington)	Democratic	January 3, 1979 – January 3, 2005	96th 97th 98th 99th 100th 101st 102nd 103rd 104th 105th 106th 107th 108th	Elected in 1978. Re-elected in 1980. Re-elected in 1982. Re-elected in 1984. Re-elected in 1986. Re-elected in 1988. Re-elected in 1990. Re-elected in 1992. Re-elected in 1994. Re-elected in 1996. Re-elected in 1998. Re-elected in 2000. Re-elected in 2002. Redistricted to the 32nd district and lost re-election.	1993–1997; Navarro; parts of Dallas, Ellis, and Tarrant
Martin Frost (Arlington)	Democratic	January 3, 1979 – January 3, 2005	96th 97th 98th 99th 100th 101st 102nd 103rd 104th 105th 106th 107th 108th	Elected in 1978. Re-elected in 1980. Re-elected in 1982. Re-elected in 1984. Re-elected in 1986. Re-elected in 1988. Re-elected in 1990. Re-elected in 1992. Re-elected in 1994. Re-elected in 1996. Re-elected in 1998. Re-elected in 2000. Re-elected in 2002. Redistricted to the 32nd district and lost re-election.	1997–2003; Navarro; parts of Dallas, Ellis, and Tarrant
Martin Frost (Arlington)	Democratic	January 3, 1979 – January 3, 2005	96th 97th 98th 99th 100th 101st 102nd 103rd 104th 105th 106th 107th 108th	Elected in 1978. Re-elected in 1980. Re-elected in 1982. Re-elected in 1984. Re-elected in 1986. Re-elected in 1988. Re-elected in 1990. Re-elected in 1992. Re-elected in 1994. Re-elected in 1996. Re-elected in 1998. Re-elected in 2000. Re-elected in 2002. Redistricted to the 32nd district and lost re-election.	2003–2005; Parts of Dallas and Tarrant
Kenny Marchant (Coppell)	Republican	January 3, 2005 – January 3, 2021	109th 110th 111th 112th 113th 114th 115th 116th	Elected in 2004. Re-elected in 2006. Re-elected in 2008. Re-elected in 2010. Re-elected in 2012. Re-elected in 2014. Re-elected in 2016. Re-elected in 2018. Retired.	2005–2013 Parts of Dallas, Denton, and Tarrant
Kenny Marchant (Coppell)	Republican	January 3, 2005 – January 3, 2021	109th 110th 111th 112th 113th 114th 115th 116th	Elected in 2004. Re-elected in 2006. Re-elected in 2008. Re-elected in 2010. Re-elected in 2012. Re-elected in 2014. Re-elected in 2016. Re-elected in 2018. Retired.	2013–2023 Parts of Dallas, Denton, and Tarrant
Beth Van Duyne (Irving)	Republican	January 3, 2021 – present	117th 118th 119th	Elected in 2020. Re-elected in 2022. Re-elected in 2024. Re-elected in 2026.	2013–2023 Parts of Dallas, Denton, and Tarrant
Beth Van Duyne (Irving)	Republican	January 3, 2021 – present	117th 118th 119th	Elected in 2020. Re-elected in 2022. Re-elected in 2024. Re-elected in 2026.	2023–2027 Parts of Dallas and Tarrant

== Recent election results ==
2004 • 2006 • 2008 • 2010 • 2012 • 2014 • 2016 • 2018 • 2020 • 2022 • 2024

=== 2004 ===
2004 United States House of Representatives elections in Texas: District 24
Party	Candidate	Votes	%	±%
Republican	Kenny Marchant	154,435	64.0%	+30.0
Democratic	Gary Page	82,599	34.2%	−30.5
Libertarian	James Lawrence	4,340	1.8%	+0.4
Majority		71,836		
Turnout		241,374	29.8%	
Republican gain from Democratic		Swing	+30.2	

=== 2006 ===
2006 United States House of Representatives elections in Texas: District 24
Party	Candidate	Votes	%	±%
Republican	Kenny Marchant (incumbent)	83,620	60.0%	−4.0
Democratic	Gary Page	51,833	37.0%	+2.8
Libertarian	Mark Frohman	4,211	3.0%	+1.2
Republican hold				

=== 2008 ===
2008 United States House of Representatives elections in Texas: District 24
Party	Candidate	Votes	%	±%
Republican	Kenny Marchant (incumbent)	151,740	55.91%	−4.09
Democratic	Tom Love	111,649	41.14%	+4.14
Libertarian	David A. Casey	7,969	2.93%	+0.13
Republican hold				

=== 2010 ===
2010 United States House of Representatives elections in Texas: District 24
Party	Candidate	Votes	%	±%
Republican	Kenny Marchant (incumbent)		81.6%	
Libertarian	David Sparks		18.4%	
Republican hold				

=== 2012 ===
2012 United States House of Representatives elections in Texas: District 24
Party	Candidate	Votes	%	±%
Republican	Kenny Marchant (incumbent)		61%	
Democratic	Tim Rusk		36%	
Libertarian	John Stathas		3%	
Republican hold				

=== 2014 ===
2014 United States House of Representatives elections in Texas: District 24
Party	Candidate	Votes	%	±%
Republican	Kenny Marchant (incumbent)	93,446	65.1%	
Democratic	Patrick McGehearty	46,360	32.3%	
Libertarian	Mike Kolls	3,799	2.6%	
Republican hold				

=== 2016 ===
2016 United States House of Representatives elections in Texas: District 24
Party	Candidate	Votes	%	±%
Republican	Kenny Marchant (incumbent)	154,364	56.2%	−8.9
Democratic	Jan McDowell	107,845	39.3%	+7.0
Libertarian	Mike Kolls	8,574	3.1%	+0.5
Republican hold				

=== 2018 ===
2018 United States House of Representatives elections in Texas: District 24
Party	Candidate	Votes	%	±%
Republican	Kenny Marchant (incumbent)	133,317	50.6%	−5.6
Democratic	Jan McDowell	125,231	47.5%	+8.2
Libertarian	Mike Kolls	4,870	1.8%	−1.3
Republican hold				

=== 2020 ===
2020 United States House of Representatives elections in Texas: District 24
Party	Candidate	Votes	%	±%
Republican	Beth Van Duyne	167,489	48.8%	−1.8
Democratic	Candace Valenzuela	162,846	47.5%	−
Libertarian	Darren Hamilton	5,630	1.6%	−0.2
Independent	Steve Kuzmich	4,218	1.2%	
Independent	Mark Bauer	2,903	0.8%	
Total votes		342,874	100.0%	
Republican hold				

=== 2022 ===
2022 United States House of Representatives elections in Texas: District 24
Party	Candidate	Votes	%	±%
Republican	Beth Van Duyne (incumbent)	177,947	59.7%	+10.9
Democratic	Jan McDowell	119,878	40.2%	−7.3
Total votes		297,825	100.0%	
Republican hold				

=== 2024 ===
2024 United States House of Representatives elections in Texas: District 24
Party	Candidate	Votes	%
Republican	Beth Van Duyne (incumbent)	227,108	60.30
Democratic	Sam Eppler	149,518	39.70
Total votes		376,626	100.00
Republican hold			

== See also ==
- List of United States congressional districts
