= United States House Ways and Means Subcommittee on Work and Welfare =

Subcommittee of Committee on Ways and Means
- Active United States House of Representatives; 119th Congress

Leadership
- Chair: Darin LaHood (R)
- Ranking Member: Danny K. Davis (D)

Structure
- Seats: 13 (13 currently filled) 8/8 5/5
- Political parties: Majority (8): Republican (8); Minority (5): Democratic (5)

Meeting place
- 1139, Longworth House Office Building; Washington, D.C. 20515

Phone number
- (202)-225-9263

The Subcommittee on Worker and Family Support is a subcommittee of the Committee on Ways and Means in the United States House of Representatives. From 2007 to 2011, it was known as the Subcommittee on Income Security and Family Support. Full committee chairman David Camp renamed the subcommittee in 2011, returning it to the Subcommittee on Human Resources, the name it held prior to the 110th Congress. In 2019 the subcommittee was named the Subcommittee on Worker and Family Support, before Republicans gave it its current name in 2023.

== Jurisdiction ==
From the Committee rules:

- The jurisdiction of the Subcommittee on Human Resources shall include bills and matters referred to the Committee on Ways and Means that relate to the public assistance provisions of the Social Security Act, including Temporary Assistance for Needy Families, child care, child and family services, child support, foster care, adoption, supplemental security income social services, eligibility of welfare recipients for food stamps, and low-income energy assistance. More specifically, the jurisdiction of the Subcommittee on Human Resources shall include bills and matters relating to titles I, IV, VI, X, XIV, XVI, XVII, XX and related provisions of titles VII and XI of the Social Security Act.
- The jurisdiction of the Subcommittee on Human Resources shall also include bills and matters referred to the Committee on Ways and Means that relate to the Federal-State system of unemployment compensation, and the financing thereof, including the programs for extended and emergency benefits. More specifically, the jurisdiction of the Subcommittee on Human Resources shall also include all bills and matters pertaining to the programs of unemployment compensation under titles III, IX and XII of the Social Security Act, Chapters 23 and 23A of the Internal Revenue Code, and the Federal-State Extended Unemployment Compensation Act of 1970, and provisions relating thereto.

== Members, 119th Congress ==
Majority	Minority
Darin LaHood, Illinois, Chair; Mike Carey, Ohio; Rudy Yakym, Indiana; Max Miller, Ohio; Aaron Bean, Florida; Nathaniel Moran, Texas; Beth Van Duyne, Texas; Randy Feenstra, Iowa	Danny Davis, Illinois, Ranking Member; Judy Chu, California; Gwen Moore, Wisconsin; Dwight Evans, Pennsylvania; Jimmy Gomez, California
Ex officio
Jason Smith, Missouri	Richard Neal, Massachusetts

== Historical membership rosters ==
=== 115th Congress ===
Majority	Minority
Adrian Smith, Nebraska, Chairman; Jason Smith, Missouri; Jackie Walorski, Indiana; Carlos Curbelo, Florida; Dave Reichert, Washington; Tom Reed, New York; Tom Rice, South Carolina	Danny Davis, Illinois, Ranking Member; Lloyd Doggett, Texas; Linda Sánchez, California; Terri Sewell, Alabama
Ex officio
Kevin Brady, Texas	Richard Neal, Massachusetts

=== 116th Congress ===
Majority	Minority
Danny Davis, Illinois, Chair; Judy Chu, California; Terri Sewell, Alabama; Gwen Moore, Wisconsin; Dwight Evans, Pennsylvania; Stephanie Murphy, Florida; Jimmy Gomez, California	Jackie Walorski, Indiana, Ranking Member; Brad Wenstrup, Ohio; Ron Estes, Kansas; Tom Reed, New York
Ex officio
Richard Neal, Massachusetts	Kevin Brady, Texas

=== 117th Congress ===
Majority	Minority
Danny Davis, Illinois, Chair; Judy Chu, California; Gwen Moore, Wisconsin; Dwight Evans, Pennsylvania; Stephanie Murphy, Florida; Jimmy Gomez, California; Dan Kildee, Michigan; Jimmy Panetta, California	Jackie Walorski, Indiana, Ranking Member (until August 3, 2022); Brad Wenstrup, Ohio; Lloyd Smucker, Pennsylvania; Kevin Hern, Oklahoma; Carol Miller, West Virginia
Ex officio
Richard Neal, Massachusetts	Kevin Brady, Texas

=== 118th Congress ===
Majority	Minority
Darin LaHood, Illinois, Chair; Brad Wenstrup, Ohio; Mike Carey, Ohio; Blake Moore, Utah; Michelle Steel, California; Lloyd Smucker, Pennsylvania; Adrian Smith, Nebraska; Claudia Tenney, New York	Danny Davis, Illinois; Judy Chu, California; Gwen Moore, Wisconsin; Dwight Evans, Pennsylvania; Jimmy Gomez, California (from February 6, 2024)
Ex officio
Jason Smith, Missouri	Richard Neal, Massachusetts
