= United States House Ways and Means Subcommittee on Oversight =

Subcommittee of Committee on Ways and Means
- Active United States House of Representatives; 119th Congress

Leadership
- Chair: David Schweikert (R)
- Ranking Member: Terri Sewell (D)

Structure
- Seats: 13 (13 currently filled) 8/8 5/5
- Political parties: Majority (8): Republican (8); Minority (5): Democratic (5)

Meeting place
- 1139, Longworth House Office Building; Washington, D.C. 20515

Phone number
- (202)-225-3625

The House Ways and Means Subcommittee on Oversight is one of the six subcommittees within the House Ways and Means Committee.

== Jurisdiction ==
From the House Rules:

- The jurisdiction of the Subcommittee on Oversight shall include all matters within the scope of the full Committee’s jurisdiction but shall be limited to existing law. Said oversight jurisdiction shall not be exclusive but shall be concurrent with that of the other Subcommittees. With respect to matters involving the Internal Revenue Code and other revenue issues, said concurrent jurisdiction shall be shared with the full Committee. Before undertaking any investigation or hearing, the Chairman of the Subcommittee on Oversight shall confer with the Chairman of the full Committee and the Chairman of any other Subcommittee having jurisdiction.

== Members, 119th Congress ==
Majority	Minority
David Schweikert, Arizona, Chair; Michelle Fischbach, Minnesota; Beth Van Duyne, Texas; Nicole Malliotakis, New York; Rudy Yakym, Indiana; Max Miller, Ohio; Aaron Bean, Florida; Nathaniel Moran, Texas	Terri Sewell, Alabama, Ranking Member; Judy Chu, California; Suzan DelBene, Washington; Tom Suozzi, New York; Lloyd Doggett, Texas
Ex officio
Jason Smith, Missouri	Richard Neal, Massachusetts

== Historical membership rosters ==
=== 115th Congress ===
Majority	Minority
Vern Buchanan, Florida, Chairman; Pat Meehan, Pennsylvania; Jason Smith, Missouri; David Schweikert, Arizona; Jackie Walorski, Indiana; Carlos Curbelo, Florida; George Holding, North Carolina	John Lewis, Georgia, Ranking Member; Joseph Crowley, New York; Danny K. Davis, Illinois; Earl Blumenauer, Oregon
Ex officio
Kevin Brady, Texas	Richard Neal, Massachusetts

=== 116th Congress ===
Majority	Minority
Bill Pascrell, New Jersey, Chair; Linda Sanchez, California; Judy Chu, California; Suzan DelBene, Washington; Gwen Moore, Wisconsin; Brendan Boyle, Pennsylvania; Thomas Suozzi, New York	Mike Kelly, Pennsylvania, Ranking Member; Jackie Walorski, Indiana; Darin LaHood, Illinois; Brad Wenstrup, Ohio
Ex officio
Richard Neal, Massachusetts	Kevin Brady, Texas

=== 117th Congress ===
Majority	Minority
Bill Pascrell, New Jersey, Chair; Thomas Suozzi, New York; Judy Chu, California; Brad Schneider, Illinois; Stacey Plaskett, U.S. Virgin Islands; Lloyd Doggett, Texas; Dwight Evans, Pennsylvania; Steven Horsford, Nevada	Mike Kelly, Pennsylvania, Ranking Member; Jackie Walorski, Indiana (until August 3, 2022); Brad Wenstrup, Ohio; Drew Ferguson, Georgia; Lloyd Smucker, Pennsylvania
Ex officio
Richard Neal, Massachusetts	Kevin Brady, Texas

=== 118th Congress ===
Majority	Minority
David Schweikert, Arizona, Chair; Brian Fitzpatrick, Pennsylvania; Greg Steube, Florida; Claudia Tenney, New York; Michelle Fischbach, Minnesota; Beth Van Duyne, Texas; Randy Feenstra, Iowa; Nicole Malliotakis, New York	Linda Sánchez, California, Ranking Member (from September 10, 2024); Bill Pascrell, New Jersey, Ranking Member (until August 21, 2024); Judy Chu, California; Suzan DelBene, Washington; Don Beyer, Virginia; Jimmy Gomez, California (from February 6, 2024)
Ex officio
Jason Smith, Missouri	Richard Neal, Massachusetts
