= Beth Van Duyne =

American politician (born 1970)

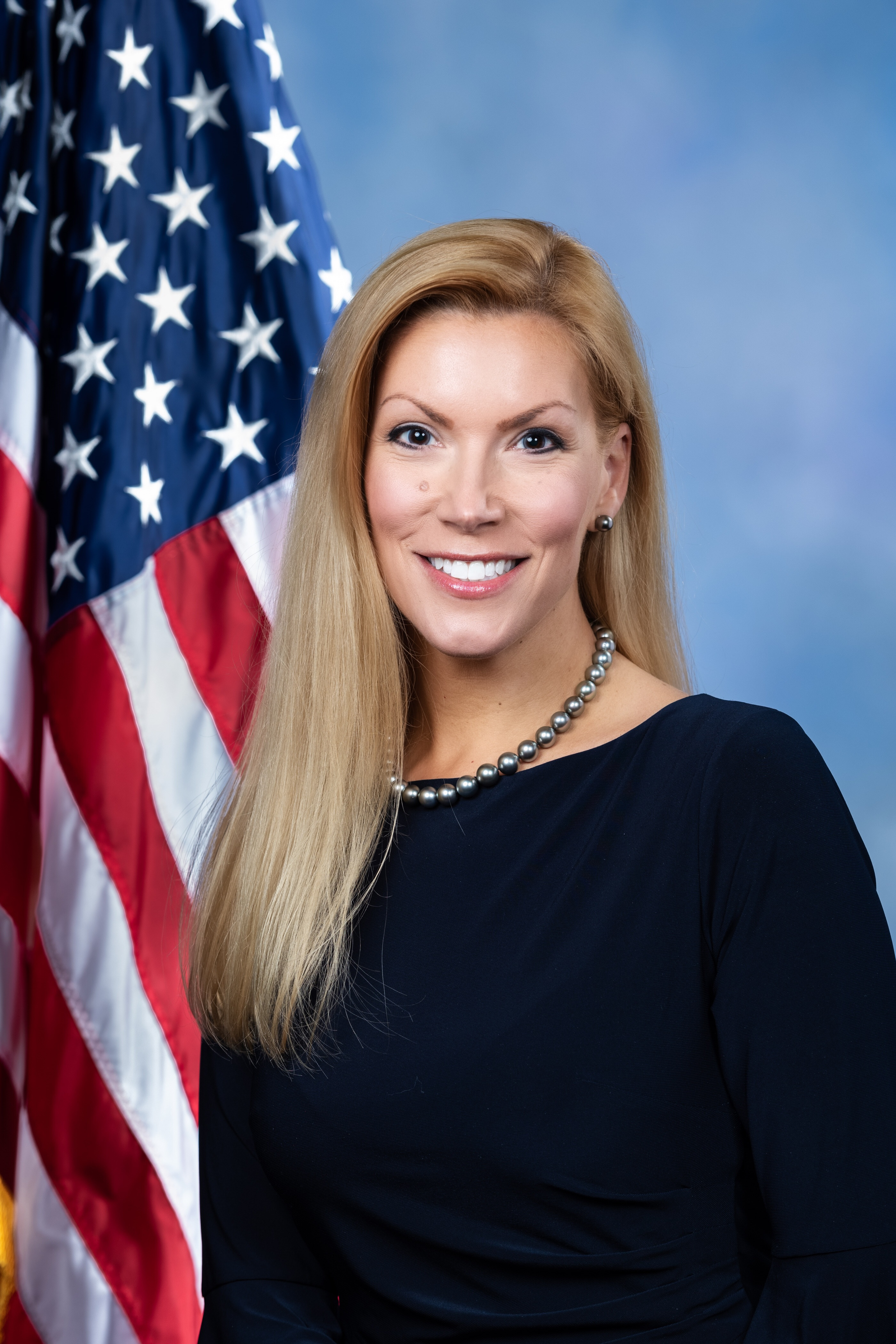
- Official portrait, 2020

Member of the U.S. House of Representatives from Texas's 24th district
- Incumbent
- Assumed office January 3, 2021
- Preceded by: Kenny Marchant

Mayor of Irving
- In office July 7, 2011 – May 16, 2017
- Preceded by: Herbert Gears
- Succeeded by: Rick Stopfer

Personal details
- Born: November 16, 1970 (age 56) Albany, New York, U.S.
- Party: Republican
- Spouse: Casey Wallach (m. 1995; div. 2012)
- Children: 2
- Education: Cornell University (BA)
- Website: House website Campaign website

Elizabeth Ann Van Duyne (/ˌvænˈdaɪn/ van-DYNE; born November 16, 1970) is an American politician serving as the U.S. representative for Texas's 24th congressional district since 2021. A member of the Republican Party, she was mayor of Irving, Texas from 2011 to 2017. She was an official in the U.S. Department of Housing and Urban Development during the first Trump administration.

== Early life and education ==
Van Duyne was born in Albany, New York, lived in Amsterdam, New York, until she was seven years old, and later lived in Cooperstown, New York. In 1986, her family moved to Irving, Texas. She graduated from Greenhill School in Addison, Texas. She also graduated from Cornell University, magna cum laude, where she earned a Bachelor of Arts in city and regional planning, government, and law.

== Career ==
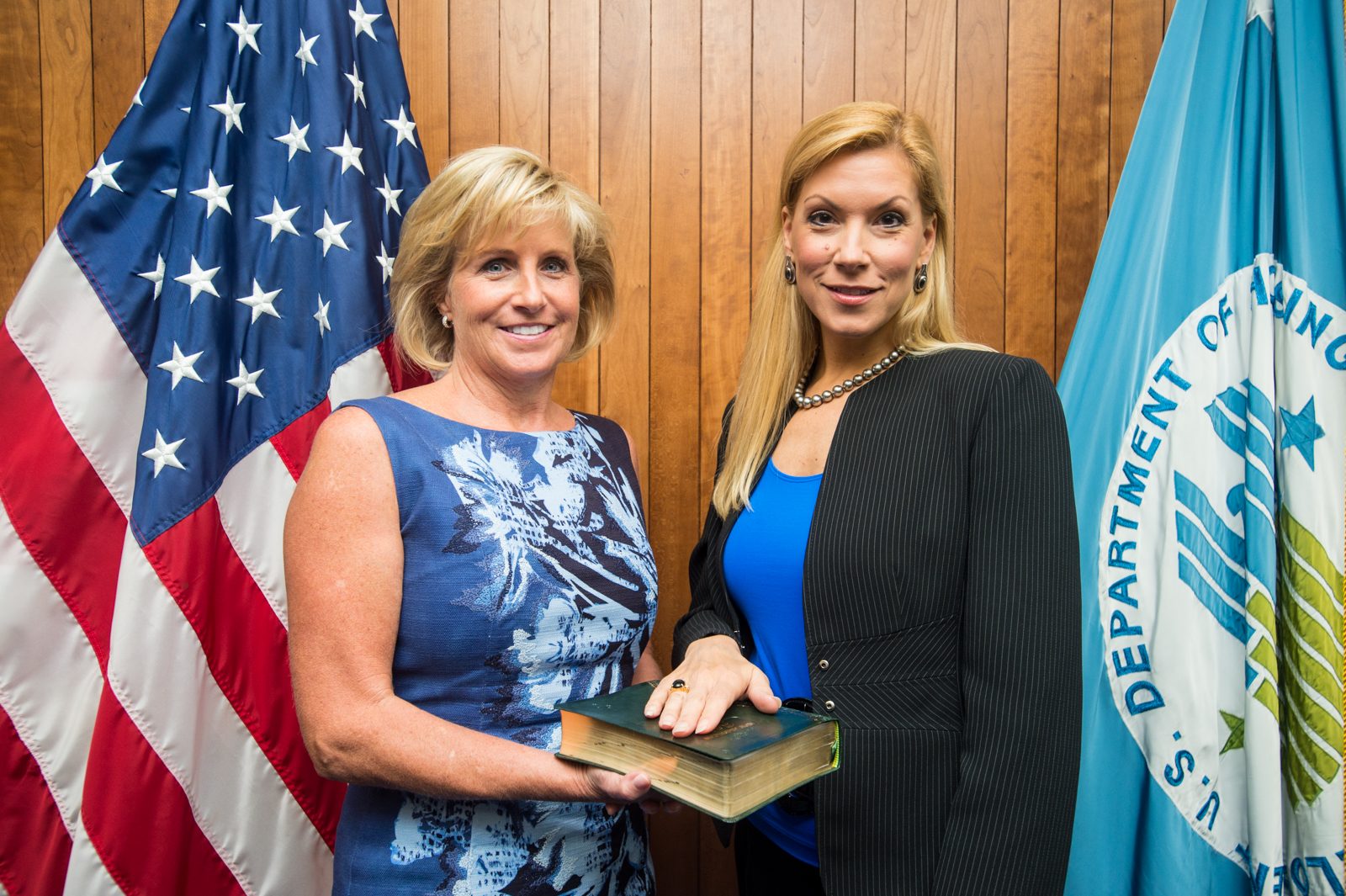
Van Duyne with Pam Patenaude in 2017

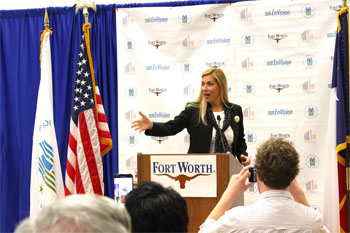
Van Duyne as HUD Southwest Regional Administrator in Fort Worth, Texas, in 2019

Van Duyne became dissatisfied with Herbert Gears, the Democratic Irving city councillor representing her, over how he handled a zoning case in her neighborhood. She ran against Gears in the 2004 election, and won. Gears was elected mayor in 2005. Van Duyne stepped down from the council in 2010, and successfully ran for mayor against Gears in the 2011 election. She defeated Gears in a rematch in 2014.

In 2015, following an article by Breitbart News that made a false allegation that a court in the Dallas–Fort Worth metroplex followed Sharia law, Van Duyne pushed for a vote on a resolution in the Irving City Council that expressed support of a bill in the Texas Legislature seeking to ban Sharia law. Also in 2015, when Ahmed Mohamed, a 14-year-old Muslim boy, was arrested for bringing a homemade clock, which teachers thought was a bomb, to school, Van Duyne defended the school's and the Irving Police Department's actions. She was named as a co-defendant in a defamation lawsuit initiated by Mohamed's father. Van Duyne was dismissed from the suit, based partially on the Texas Citizens Participation Act, a state law that "prohibits the use of lawsuits to intimidate or silence citizens and public officials from exercising their right of free speech." The entire suit was eventually dismissed by the judge, who ruled the plaintiffs had failed to prove officials discriminated against Mohamed.

In February 2017, Van Duyne announced that she would not seek a third term as mayor. In May 2017, President Donald Trump appointed Van Duyne as a regional administrator for the United States Department of Housing and Urban Development (HUD), overseeing Texas, Oklahoma, New Mexico, Louisiana, and Arkansas.

== U.S. House of Representatives ==
=== Elections ===
==== 2020 ====
After Kenny Marchant announced in August 2019 that he would not seek reelection to the United States House of Representatives, Van Duyne resigned from HUD so that she could run to succeed Marchant in representing Texas's 24th congressional district, a suburban stretch between Dallas and Fort Worth, including parts of Denton, Dallas, and Tarrant counties. She received Trump's endorsement in early 2020 and won the Republican primary on March 3, defeating four rivals with about 65% of the vote.

In the general election, Van Duyne faced the Democratic nominee, Candace Valenzuela, a former Carrollton-Farmers Branch school board member. Van Duyne opposed the Affordable Care Act, saying it "has done profound damage to the healthcare of Americans." During the campaign, Van Duyne ran advertisements in which she said she would protect laws that require preexisting conditions to be covered by insurance. Valenzuela criticized Van Duyne for not wearing a face mask or socially distancing at campaign events, in contradiction to public health guidance at the time. Van Duyne called Valenzuela a "coward" for not campaigning in person during the pandemic, and praised the Trump administration's handling of the public health crisis. On criminal justice reform, Van Duyne stated her opposition to ending cash bail. The Atlantic has described Van Duyne as "the new face of Trumpism in Texas."

On November 3, Van Duyne defeated Valenzuela, 48.8% to 47.5%, even as Democratic presidential nominee Joe Biden carried the district by 5 points. According to the Dallas Morning News, Van Duyne focused on public safety and the economy during the campaign. During the campaign, approximately $7.6 million was spent on advertisements against Van Duyne and $7.9 million on advertisements against Valenzuela.

==== 2022 ====
On November 8, Van Duyne defeated Democrat Jan McDowell, 59.75% to 40.25%. McDowell was previously the Democratic nominee for Texas's 24th congressional district in 2016 and 2018, losing both times to Kenny Marchant.

The 24th was competitive in the previous two elections, but redistricting maps released by Republicans in 2021 made the district much safer for Van Duyne. It was pushed into whiter, wealthier and traditionally Republican areas near Dallas and Fort Worth, including the Park Cities. This made the district 20 points more Republican than its predecessor, and also drew her 2020 challenger's home out of the district.

==== 2024 ====
Van Duyne ran for a third term and defeated Democrat Sam Eppler in the general election, winning 60% of the vote.

==== 2026 ====
Van Duyne ran for a fourth term and defeated Democrat Kevin Burgein in the general election, winning 53.4% of the vote.

=== Tenure ===
Van Duyne is one of 147 Republican lawmakers who voted to overturn results in the 2020 presidential election by objecting to Pennsylvania's electors on January 7, 2021.

=== Political positions ===
==== Ukraine ====
Van Duyne voted against H.R. 7691, the Additional Ukraine Supplemental Appropriations Act, 2022, which would provide $40 billion in emergency aid to the Ukrainian government.

==== 2024 Republican primary ====
Van Duyne was named as part of the 2024 Trump campaign's Texas leadership team in March.

==== Fiscal Responsibility Act of 2023 ====
Van Duyne was among the 71 Republicans who voted against final passage of the Fiscal Responsibility Act of 2023 in the House.

=== Committee assignments ===
- Committee on Ways and Means
  - Subcommittee on Trade
  - Subcommittee on Tax
  - Subcommittee on Work and Welfare
  - Subcommittee on Oversight
- Committee on Small Business
  - Subcommittee on Economic Growth, Tax and Capital Access (Chair)
  - Subcommittee on Oversight, Investigations and Regulations
- Select Committee on the Modernization of Congress

=== Caucus memberships ===
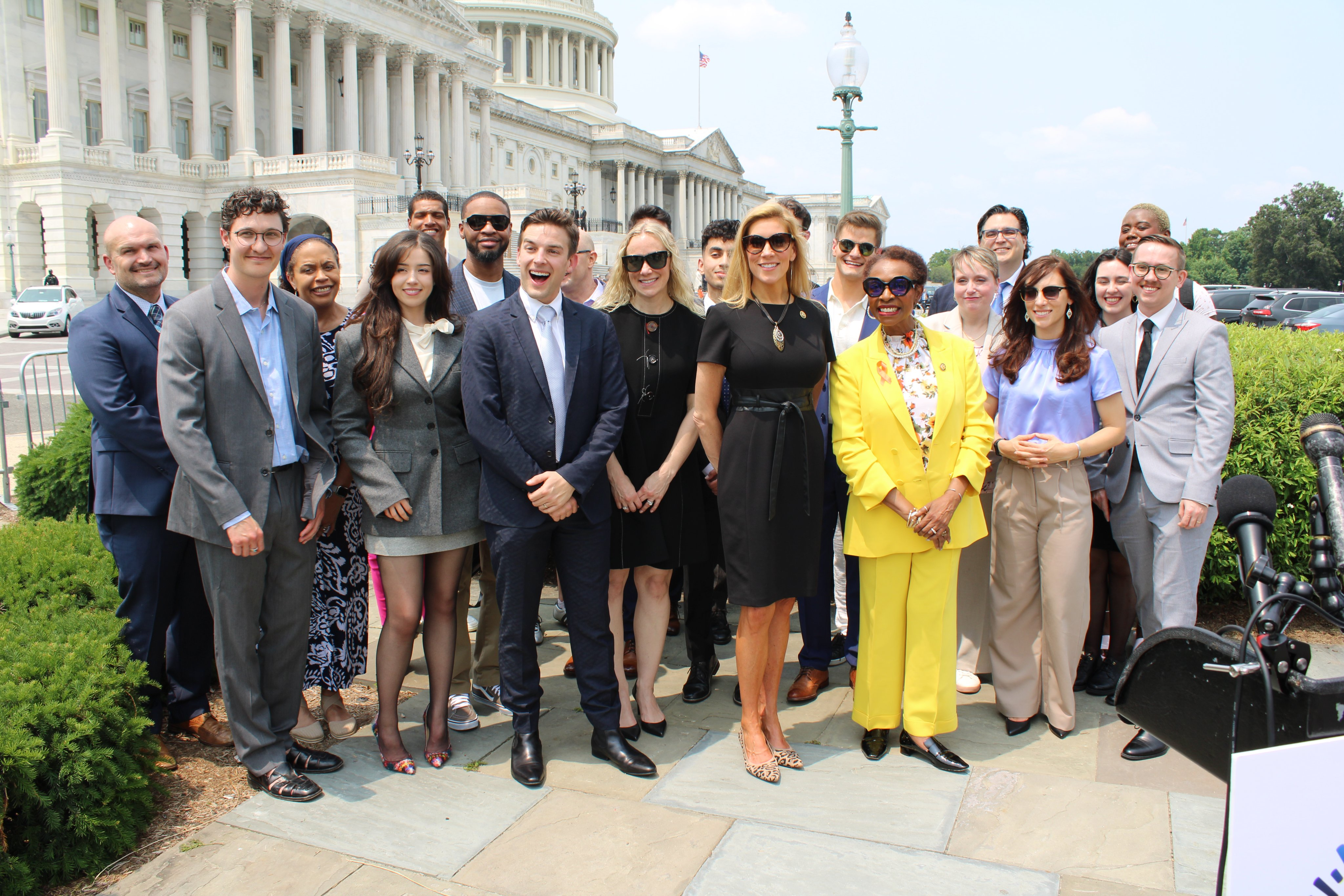
Duyne with various content creators and Representative Yvette Clarke at the launch of the Creator Economy Caucus in June 2025.

- Republican Governance Group
- Congressional Western Caucus
- Creator Economy Caucus Chair

== Personal life ==
Van Duyne met her former husband, Chris "Casey" Wallach, while they were attending Cornell University. They have two children, and divorced in 2012 after being married for 17 years. Van Duyne confirmed she was in a relationship with Georgia congressman Rich McCormick in 2024.

In February 2021, a man died by suicide using a firearm outside of Van Duyne's home in Irving. The man was identified as Richard Christian Dillard, a former communications staffer for her 2020 House campaign.

Van Duyne is an Episcopalian.

== Electoral history ==
Texas's 24th congressional district, 2020
Party	Candidate	Votes	%
Republican	Beth Van Duyne	167,374	48.8
Democratic	Candace Valenzuela	162,749	47.5
Libertarian	Darren Hamilton	5,630	1.6
Independent	Steve Kuzmich	4,218	1.2
Independent	Mark Bauer	2,903	0.8
Total votes		342,874	100.0

Texas's 24th congressional district, 2022
Party	Candidate	Votes	%
Republican	Beth Van Duyne (incumbent)	177,947	59.75
Democratic	Jan McDowell	119,878	40.25
Total votes		297,825	100.0

Texas's 24th congressional district, 2024
Party	Candidate	Votes	%
Republican	Beth Van Duyne (incumbent)	227,108	60.30
Democratic	Sam Eppler	149,518	39.70
Total votes		376,626	100.00

Texas's 24th congressional district, 2026
Party	Candidate	Votes	%
Republican	Beth Van Duyne (incumbent)	171,751	53.4
Democratic	Kevin Burge	149,697	46.6
Total votes		321,448	100.00

== See also ==
- Women in the United States House of Representatives

U.S. House of Representatives
Preceded by Kenny Marchant	Member of the U.S. House of Representatives from Texas's 24th congressional district 2021–present	Incumbent
U.S. order of precedence (ceremonial)
Preceded by Ritchie Torres	United States representatives by seniority 278th	Succeeded by Nikema Williams
