= United States House Ways and Means Subcommittee on Tax =

Subcommittee of Committee on Ways and Means
- Active United States House of Representatives; 119th Congress

Leadership
- Chair: Mike Kelly (R)
- Ranking Member: Mike Thompson (D)

Structure
- Seats: 19 (19 currently filled) 11/11 8/8
- Political parties: Majority (11): Republican (11); Minority (8): Democratic (8)

Meeting place
- 1139, Longworth House Office Building; Washington, D.C. 20515

Phone number
- (202)-225-5522

The Subcommittee on Tax is a subcommittee of the Committee on Ways and Means in the United States House of Representatives. Between 2019 and 2023 known as the Subcommittee on Select Revenue Measures, before receiving its current name after a return to Republican control.

== Members, 119th Congress ==
Majority	Minority
Mike Kelly, Pennsylvania, Chair; David Schweikert, Arizona; Jodey Arrington, Texas; Kevin Hern, Oklahoma; Ron Estes, Kansas; Lloyd Smucker, Pennsylvania; David Kustoff, Tennessee; Beth Van Duyne, Texas; Randy Feenstra, Iowa; Nicole Malliotakis, New York; Brian Fitzpatrick, Pennsylvania	Mike Thompson, California, Ranking Member; Suzan DelBene, Washington; Gwen Moore, Wisconsin; Brad Schneider, Illinois; Jimmy Gomez, California; Don Beyer, Virginia; Stacey Plaskett, U.S. Virgin Islands; Tom Suozzi, New York
Ex officio
Jason Smith, Missouri	Richard Neal, Massachusetts

== Historical membership rosters ==
=== 115th Congress ===
Majority	Minority
Peter Roskam, Illinois, Chairman; Dave Reichert, Washington; Pat Tiberi, Ohio; Tom Reed, New York; Mike Kelly, Pennsylvania; Jim Renacci, Ohio; Kristi Noem, South Dakota; George Holding, North Carolina; Kenny Marchant, Texas	Lloyd Doggett, Texas, Ranking Member; John B. Larson, Connecticut; Linda Sánchez, California; Mike Thompson, California; Suzan DelBene, Washington; Earl Blumenauer, Oregon
Ex officio
Kevin Brady, Texas	Richard Neal, Massachusetts

=== 116th Congress ===
Majority	Minority
Mike Thompson, California, Chair; Lloyd Doggett, Texas; John B. Larson, Connecticut; Linda Sánchez, California; Suzan DelBene, Washington; Gwen Moore, Wisconsin; Brendan Boyle, Pennsylvania; Don Beyer, Virginia; Thomas Suozzi, New York	Adrian Smith, Ranking Member; Tom Rice, South Carolina; David Schweikert, Arizona; Darin LaHood, Illinois; Jodey Arrington, Texas; Drew Ferguson, Georgia
Ex officio
Richard Neal, Massachusetts	Kevin Brady, Texas

=== 117th Congress ===
Majority	Minority
Mike Thompson, California, Chair; Lloyd Doggett, Texas; John B. Larson, Connecticut; Linda Sánchez, California; Suzan DelBene, Washington; Gwen Moore, Wisconsin; Brendan Boyle, Pennsylvania; Don Beyer, Virginia; Thomas Suozzi, New York; Stacey Plaskett, U.S. Virgin Islands; Terri Sewell, Alabama	Adrian Smith, Ranking Member; Tom Rice, South Carolina; David Schweikert, Arizona; Darin LaHood, Illinois; Jodey Arrington, Texas; Drew Ferguson, Georgia; Kevin Hern, Oklahoma; Ron Estes, Kansas
Ex officio
Richard Neal, Massachusetts	Kevin Brady, Texas

=== 118th Congress ===
Majority	Minority
Mike Kelly, Pennsylvania, Chair; David Schweikert, Arizona; Jodey Arrington, Texas; Drew Ferguson, Georgia; Kevin Hern, Oklahoma; Ron Estes, Kansas; Lloyd Smucker, Pennsylvania; David Kustoff, Tennessee; Beth Van Duyne, Texas; Randy Feenstra, Iowa; Nicole Malliotakis, New York	Mike Thompson, California, Ranking Member; Lloyd Doggett, Texas; John B. Larson, Connecticut; Linda Sánchez, California; Suzan DelBene, Washington; Gwen Moore, Wisconsin; Brad Schneider, Illinois; Jimmy Gomez, California (from February 6, 2024)
Ex officio
Jason Smith, Missouri	Richard Neal, Massachusetts
