= Brad Wenstrup =

American politician (born 1958)

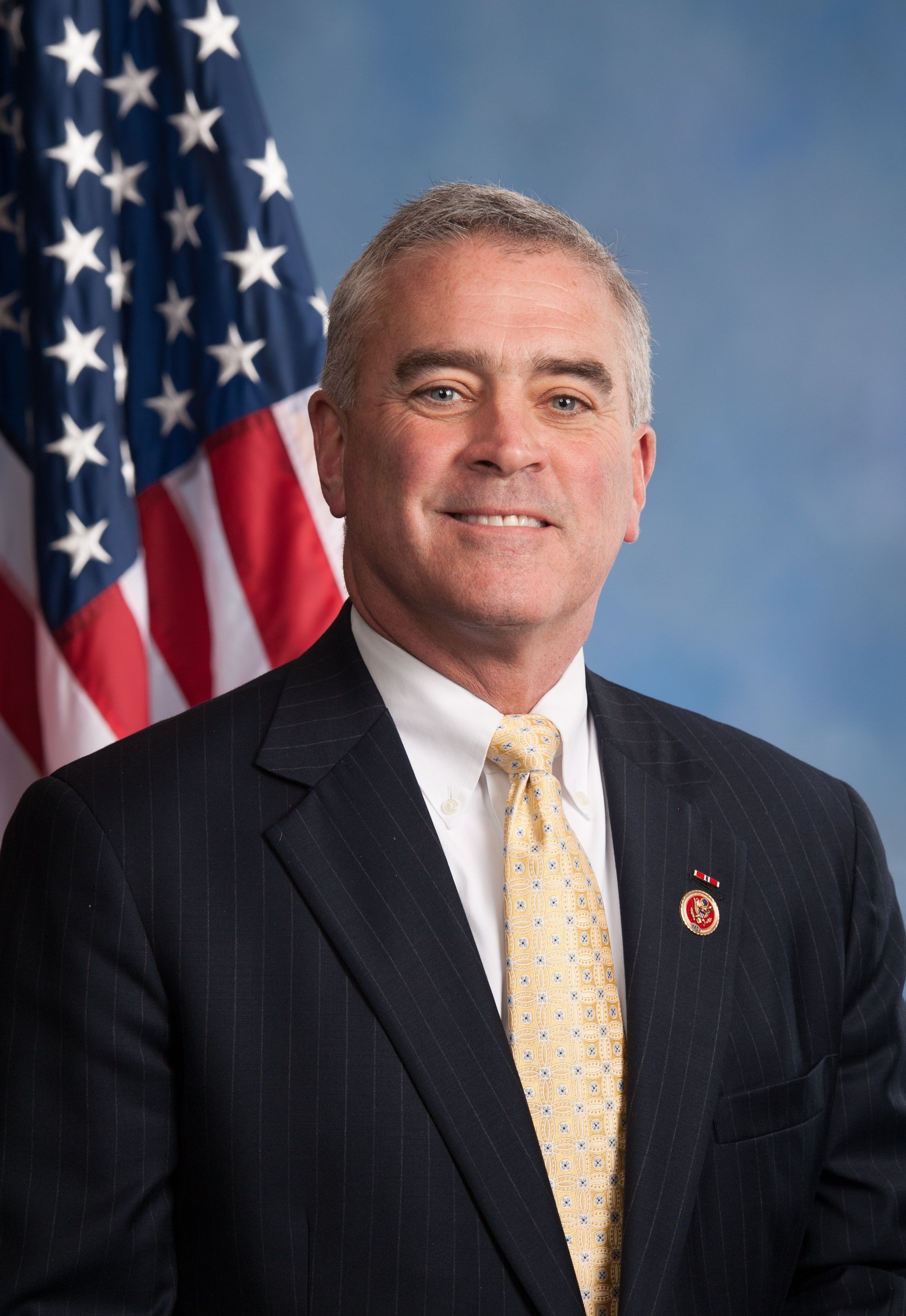
- Official portrait, 2015

Member of the U.S. House of Representatives from Ohio's 2nd district
- In office January 3, 2013 – January 3, 2025
- Preceded by: Jean Schmidt
- Succeeded by: David Taylor

Personal details
- Born: Brad Robert Wenstrup; June 17, 1958 (age 68) Cincinnati, Ohio, U.S.
- Party: Republican
- Spouse: Monica Klein (m. 2012)
- Children: 2
- Education: University of Cincinnati (BA); Rosalind Franklin University (BS, DPM)

Military service
- Branch/service: United States Army; Army Reserve
- Years of service: 1998–2022
- Rank: Colonel
- Unit: 344th Combat Support Hospital
- Battles/wars: Iraq War
- Awards: Soldier's Medal; Bronze Star
- Wenstrup's voice Wenstrup celebrating Ulysses S. Grant's 200th birthday. Recorded April 26, 2022

Brad Robert Wenstrup (born June 17, 1958) is an American politician, U.S. Army Reserve officer, and doctor of podiatric medicine, who served as the U.S. representative for Ohio's 2nd congressional district from 2013 to 2025. A Republican, he upset incumbent U.S. representative Jean Schmidt to win the 2012 Republican primary election. In November 2023, he announced he would not seek re-election in 2024.

Wenstrup is a colonel in the U.S. Army Reserve and an Iraq War veteran. After the shooting of Congressman Steve Scalise on June 14, 2017, Wenstrup attended to Scalise until he was transported to MedStar Washington Hospital Center. For his actions during the shooting, he was awarded the Soldier's Medal.

== Early life, education, and medical career ==
Wenstrup was born and raised in Cincinnati, Ohio, the son of Joan (née Carletti) and Frank John "Jack" Wenstrup. His father was of German, Irish, and English descent, and his mother was of Italian ancestry. He has a sister, Amy Castellini.

In 1976, Wenstrup graduated from St. Xavier High School in Cincinnati. In 1980, he graduated Omicron Delta Kappa and cum laude with a B.A. in psychology from the University of Cincinnati, where he was a member of the Sigma Alpha Epsilon fraternity. He then attended the Scholl College of Podiatric Medicine of Rosalind Franklin University of Medicine and Science, where he earned a B.S. in biology and a Doctor of Podiatric Medicine degree, graduating in 1985. Wenstrup practiced podiatric medicine in Cincinnati for more than 24 years before being elected to Congress.

== Military career ==
Wenstrup joined the United States Army Reserve in 1998, attaining the rank of colonel in March 2017. In 2005 and 2006, he served a tour in Iraq with the 344th Combat Support Hospital. He called his deployment "the worst thing that ever happened to me and the best thing I ever got to do." Wenstrup was awarded the Bronze Star Medal and Combat Action Badge.

During Wenstrup's tour of duty in Iraq, his sister asked what she could send him. He told her, "I wear the same clothes everyday, we're fed, and most days I'm not leaving the base. But the people here have nothing. They were under an oppressed regime and have had nothing for so long." His sister helped organize donations of toys, school supplies, and hygiene supplies donated by local companies, and Wenstrup worked with the base chaplain to distribute the donations to the locals.

== Cincinnati mayoral candidacy ==
Wenstrup ran for mayor of Cincinnati against incumbent Democrat Mark Mallory in 2009. Mallory defeated Wenstrup, 54% to 46%.

== U.S. House of Representatives ==
=== Elections ===
2012

2012 Republican primary results by county Wenstrup: 50–60%; Schmidt: 40–50%; 50–60%; 60–70%

Wenstrup ran for the U.S. House of Representatives in the newly redrawn Ohio's 2nd congressional district, held by incumbent Republican U.S. congresswoman Jean Schmidt. He was endorsed by the Anderson Tea Party and the Ohio Liberty Council, a coalition of Ohio Tea Party groups. In a surprise, he defeated Schmidt in the March Republican primary, 49% to 43%. She carried six counties (all in the district's eastern part), while Wenstrup won the two most populous counties (both in the western part): Hamilton County and Clermont County.

In the general election, Wenstrup defeated Democratic nominee William R. Smith, 59%–41%.

2014

Wenstrup was reelected, defeating Democratic nominee Marek Tyszkiewicz 66%–34%.

2016

Wenstrup was reelected to a third term, defeating Democratic candidates William Smith and Janet Everhard 65%–32.82%–2.17%.

2018

Wenstrup defeated Democratic candidate Jill Schiller, 58% to 41%, to win election to a fourth term.

2020

Wenstrup defeated Democratic candidate Jaime Castle, 61% to 39%, to win a fifth term.

=== Tenure ===
In 2013 Wenstrup's office conducted a customer service survey. According to Roll Call, very few congressional offices have conducted "genuine" surveys of constituents, instead surveying with "loaded" questions designed to achieve certain results. According to the survey, 75% of respondents were "satisfied" or "very satisfied" with their experience with Wenstrup's office.

In 2016 Wenstrup with Representative Mike Pompeo and Representative Ken Calvert led a joint task force which faulted the military intelligence of the United States Central Command in its overly positive assessment of units it was training to fight ISIL.

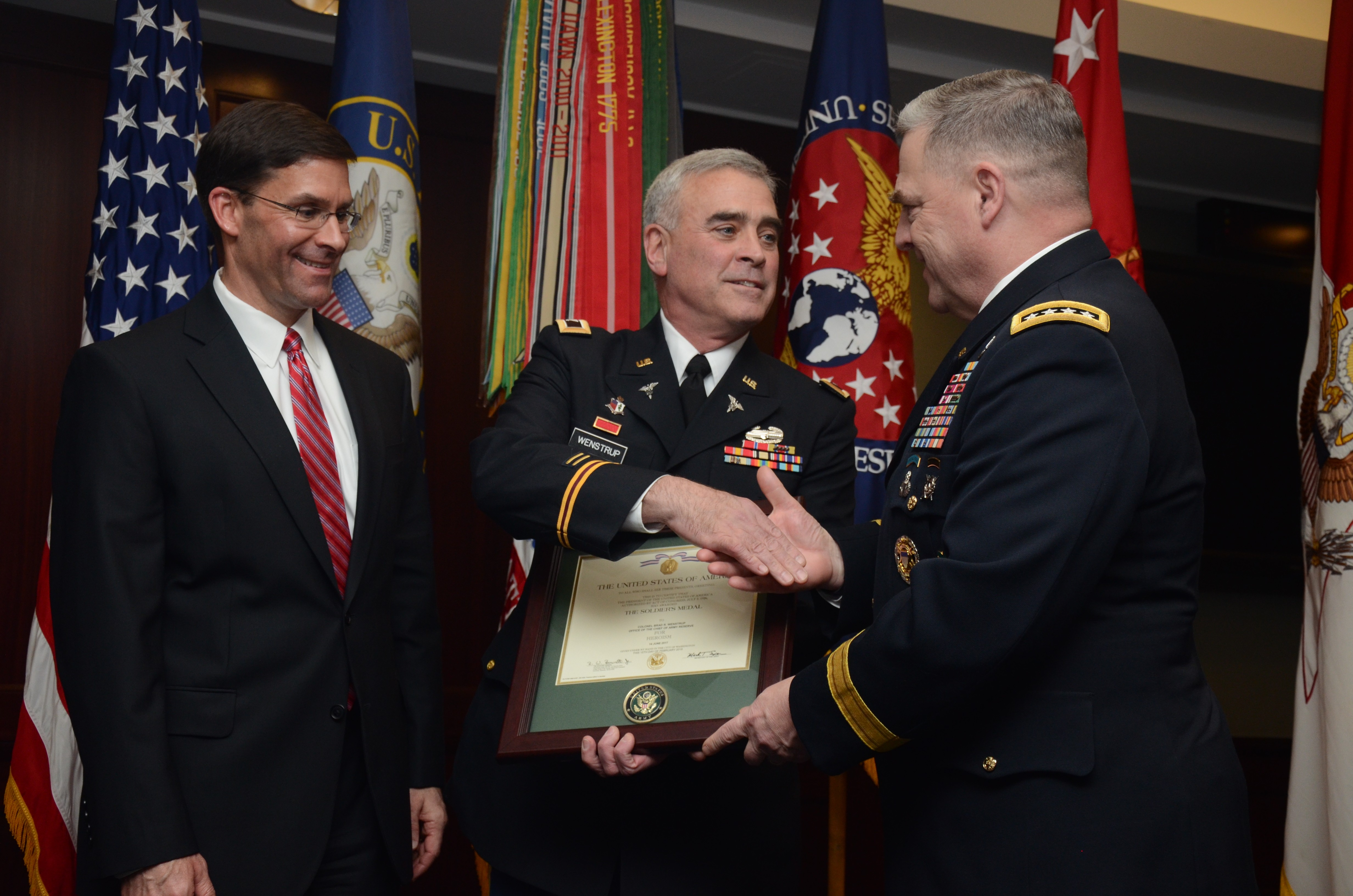
Wenstrup receiving his Soldier's Medal

Wenstrup was an original co-sponsor of H.R. 3949, the VA Prescription Data Accountability Act 2017, which became law during the 115th Congress, in 2017. The bill helps protect veterans receiving prescription medications and prevents misuse of such medications.

On November 9, 2023, Wenstrup announced he would not run for re-election in 2024.

=== Texas v. Pennsylvania ===
In December 2020, Wenstrup was one of 126 Republican members of the House of Representatives to sign an amicus brief in support of Texas v. Pennsylvania, a lawsuit filed at the United States Supreme Court contesting the results of the 2020 presidential election, in which Joe Biden defeated incumbent Donald Trump. The Supreme Court declined to hear the case on the basis that Texas lacked standing under Article III of the Constitution to challenge the results of an election held by another state.

=== Committee assignments ===
- Committee on Ways & Means
  - Subcommittee on Oversight
  - Subcommittee on Worker & Family Support
- United States House Permanent Select Committee on Intelligence
  - Subcommittee on Defense Intelligence and Warfighter Support
  - Subcommittee on Counterterrorism, Counterintelligence, and Counterproliferation
- United States House Select Subcommittee on the Coronavirus Pandemic

=== Caucus memberships ===
- Republican Study Committee
- Air Cargo Caucus
- GOP Doctors Caucus

== Post-congress ==
On February 11, 2025. Wenstrup was appointed to the President's Intelligence Advisory Board.

Wenstrup turned down a nomination to be the Commissioner of Food and Drugs in August 2026.

== Personal life ==
Wenstrup is Roman Catholic. Wenstrup is married to Monica Wenstrup (Klein), who works as a financial consultant. They have two children; they adopted a daughter in 2019.

Wenstrup's niece Anne Marie Gieske was one of the two American victims of the Seoul Halloween crowd crush.

== Electoral history ==
Ohio's 2nd congressional district (2012)
Party	Candidate	Votes	%
Republican	Brad Wenstrup	194,296	58.6
Democratic	William Smith	137,077	41.4
Total votes		331,373	100.0
Republican hold			

Ohio's 2nd congressional district (2014)
Party	Candidate	Votes	%
Republican	Brad Wenstrup (incumbent)	132,658	66.0
Democratic	Marek Tyszkiewicz	68,453	34.0
Total votes		201,111	100.0
Republican hold			

Ohio's 2nd congressional district (2016)
Party	Candidate	Votes	%
Republican	Brad Wenstrup (incumbent)	221,193	65.0
Democratic	William R. Smith	111,694	32.8
Independent	Janet Everhard (write-in)	7,392	2.2
Total votes		340,279	100.0
Republican hold			

Ohio's 2nd congressional district (2018)
Party	Candidate	Votes	%
Republican	Brad Wenstrup (incumbent)	166,714	57.6
Democratic	Jill Schiller	119,333	41.2
Green	Jim Condit Jr.	3,606	1.2
Independent	David Baker (write-in)	8	0.0
Total votes		289,661	100.0
Republican hold			

Ohio's 2nd congressional district (2020)
Party	Candidate	Votes	%
Republican	Brad Wenstrup (incumbent)	230,430	61.1
Democratic	Jaime Castle	146,781	38.9
Write-in		37	0.0
Total votes		377,248	100.0
Republican hold			

Ohio's 2nd congressional district (2022)
Party	Candidate	Votes	%
Republican	Brad Wenstrup (incumbent)	192,117	74.5
Democratic	Samantha Meadows	65,745	25.5
Total votes		257,862	100.0
Republican hold			

U.S. House of Representatives
Preceded by Jean Schmidt	Member of the U.S. House of Representatives from Ohio's 2nd congressional district 2013–2025	Succeeded by David Taylor
U.S. order of precedence (ceremonial)
Preceded by Bill Johnson as Former U.S. Representative	Order of precedence of the United States as Former U.S. Representative	Succeeded by Henson Moore as Former U.S. Representative
