= United States House Committee on Ways and Means =

Chief tax-writing committee of the House of Representatives

House Ways and Means Committee
Standing committee
- Active United States House of Representatives; 119th Congress

- Republican Majority logo (119th Congress)

History
- Formed: December 21, 1795

Leadership
- Chair: Jason T. Smith (R); Since January 10, 2023
- Ranking Member: Richard Neal (D); Since January 10, 2023

Structure
- Seats: 45 (45 currently filled) 26/26 19/19
- Political parties: Majority (26): Republican (26); Minority (19): Democratic (19)

Jurisdiction
- Senate counterpart: Senate Finance Committee

Subcommittees
- Social Security; Health; Work and Welfare; Trade; Tax; Oversight

Meeting place
- 1139, Longworth House Office Building; Washington, D.C. 20515

Website
- waysandmeans.house.gov (Republican) democrats-waysandmeans.house.gov (Democratic)

Phone number
- (202)-225-3625

The Committee on Ways and Means is the chief tax-writing committee of the United States House of Representatives. The committee has jurisdiction over all taxation, tariffs, and other revenue-raising measures, as well as a number of other programs including Social Security, unemployment benefits, Medicare, the enforcement of child support laws, Temporary Assistance for Needy Families, foster care, and adoption programs. Members of the Ways and Means Committee are not allowed to serve on any other House committee unless they are granted a waiver from their party's congressional leadership. It has long been regarded as the most prestigious committee of the House of Representatives.

The United States Constitution requires that all bills regarding taxation must originate in the U.S. House of Representatives, and House rules dictate that all bills regarding taxation must pass through Ways and Means. This system imparts upon the committee and its members a significant degree of influence over other representatives, committees, and public policy. Its Senate counterpart is the U.S. Senate Committee on Finance.

In the 119th Congress, the committee's chair is Jason Smith. Recent chairs have included Bill Thomas, Charlie Rangel, Sander Levin, Dave Camp, Paul Ryan, Kevin Brady, and Richard Neal.

== History ==
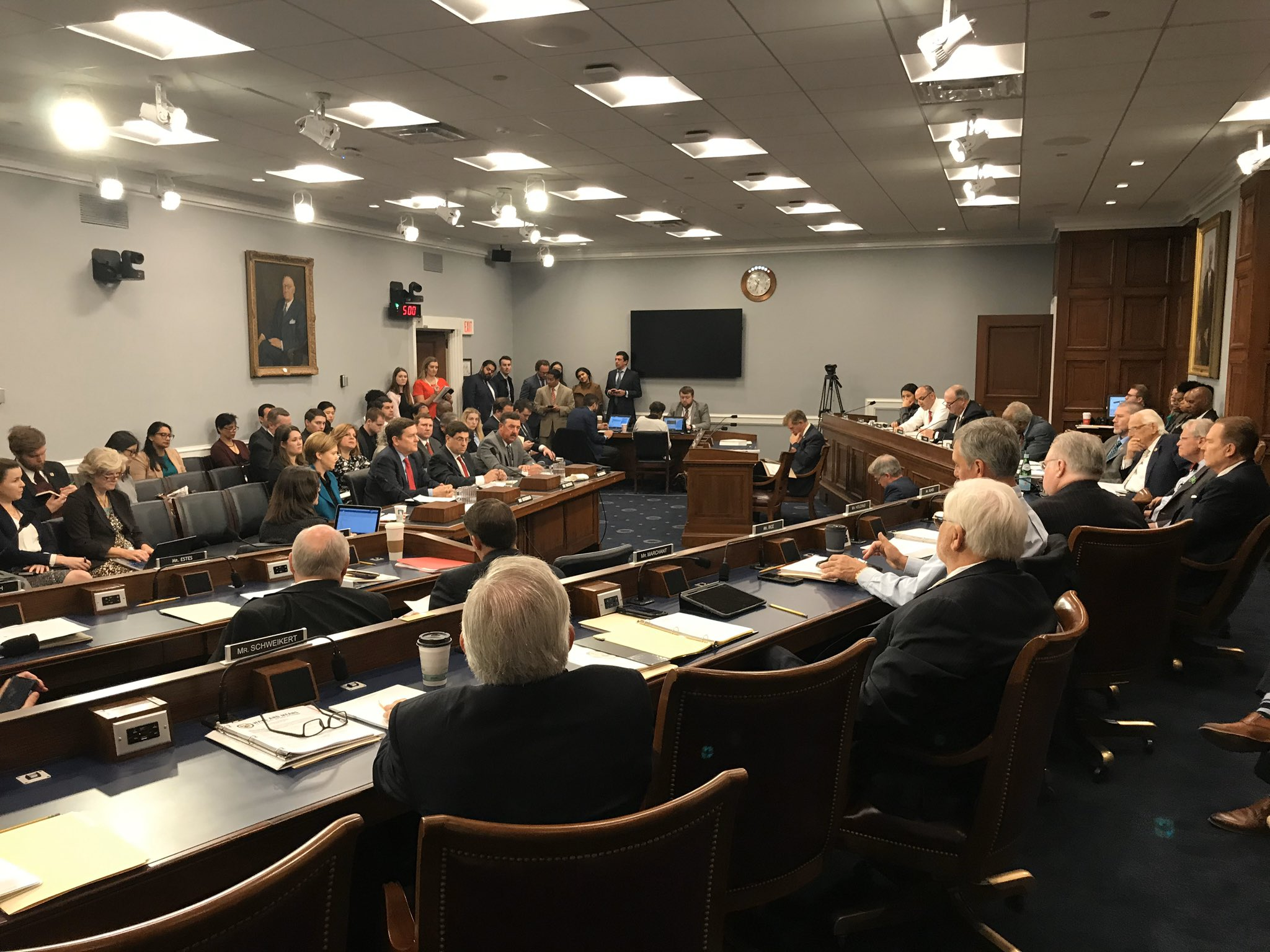
Inside a Ways and Means meeting in November 2019

The Ways and Means Committee was first established during the first Congress, in 1789. However, this initial version was disbanded after only 8 weeks; for the next several years, only ad hoc committees were formed, to write up laws on notions already debated in the whole House. It was first established as a standing committee by resolution adopted December 21, 1795, and first appeared among the list of regular standing committees on January 7, 1802. Upon its original creation, it held power over both taxes and spending, until the spending power was given to the new Appropriations Committee in 1865.

During the Civil War the key policy-maker in Congress was Thaddeus Stevens, as chair of the committee and Republican floor leader. He took charge of major legislation that funded the war effort and permanently transformed the nation's economic policies regarding tariffs, bonds, income and excise taxes, national banks, suppression of money issued by state banks, greenback currency, and western railroad land grants. Stevens was one of the major policymakers regarding Reconstruction, and obtained a House vote of impeachment against President Andrew Johnson (who was acquitted by the Senate in 1868). Hans L. Trefousse, his leading biographer, concludes that Stevens "was one of the most influential representatives ever to serve in Congress. [He dominated] the House with his wit, knowledge of parliamentary law, and sheer willpower, even though he was often unable to prevail." Historiographical views of Stevens have dramatically shifted over the years, from the early 20th-century view of Stevens and the Radical Republicans as tools of enormous business and motivated by hatred of the white South, to the perspective of the neoabolitionists of the 1950s and afterwards, who applauded their efforts to give equal rights to the freed slaves.

Four future presidents – James K. Polk, Millard Fillmore, James A. Garfield, and William McKinley – served as either committee chair or ranking member. Before the official roles of floor leader came about in the late 19th century, the chair of Ways and Means was considered the majority leader. The chair is one of very few representatives to have office space within the Capitol building itself.

== Political significance ==
Because of its wide jurisdiction, Ways and Means has always been one of the most important committees with respect to impact on policy. Although it lacks the prospects for reelection help that comes with the Appropriations Committee, it is seen as a valuable post for two reasons: given the wide array of interests that are affected by the committee, a seat makes it easy to collect campaign contributions and since its range is broad, members with a wide array of policy concerns often seek positions to be able to influence policy decisions. Some recent major issues that have gone through the Ways and Means Committee include welfare reform, a Medicare prescription drug benefit, Social Security reform, George W. Bush's tax cuts, and trade agreements including the North American Free Trade Agreement (NAFTA) and the Central America Free Trade Agreement (CAFTA).

From 1911 to 1974, the Ways and Means Committee also had the responsibility to appoint members of other committees in addition to its legislative duties. When Ways and Means chair Wilbur Mills' career ended in scandal, Congressman Phillip Burton transferred the committee's selection powers to a separate, newly created committee.

== Members, 119th Congress ==
Majority	Minority
Jason Smith, Missouri, Chair; Vern Buchanan, Florida; Adrian Smith, Nebraska; Mike Kelly, Pennsylvania; David Schweikert, Arizona; Darin LaHood, Illinois; Jodey Arrington, Texas; Ron Estes, Kansas; Lloyd Smucker, Pennsylvania; Kevin Hern, Oklahoma; Carol Miller, West Virginia; Greg Murphy, North Carolina; David Kustoff, Tennessee; Brian Fitzpatrick, Pennsylvania; Greg Steube, Florida; Claudia Tenney, New York; Michelle Fischbach, Minnesota; Blake Moore, Utah; Beth Van Duyne, Texas; Randy Feenstra, Iowa; Nicole Malliotakis, New York; Mike Carey, Ohio; Rudy Yakym, Indiana; Max Miller, Ohio; Aaron Bean, Florida; Nathaniel Moran, Texas	Richard Neal, Massachusetts, Ranking Member; Lloyd Doggett, Texas; Mike Thompson, California; John B. Larson, Connecticut; Danny Davis, Illinois; Linda Sánchez, California; Terri Sewell, Alabama; Suzan DelBene, Washington; Judy Chu, California; Gwen Moore, Wisconsin, Vice Ranking Member; Brendan Boyle, Pennsylvania; Don Beyer, Virginia; Dwight Evans, Pennsylvania; Brad Schneider, Illinois; Jimmy Panetta, California; Jimmy Gomez, California; Steven Horsford, Nevada; Stacey Plaskett, U.S. Virgin Islands; Tom Suozzi, New York

Resolutions electing members: H.Res. 13 (chair), H.Res. 14 (Ranking Member), H.Res. 21 (R), H.Res. 22 (D)

== Subcommittees ==
There are six subcommittees in the 118th Congress. In 2011, the Subcommittee on Income Security and Family Support was renamed the Subcommittee on Human Resources, returning to the name it held prior to the 110th United States Congress. In 2015, the Select Revenue Measures was renamed the Subcommittee on Tax Policy. In 2019 these two subcommittees were again renamed under Democratic control; Human Resources became Worker and Family Support and Tax Policy was renamed to Select Revenue Measures. In 2023 and under a return to Republican control, they were again renamed to Work and Welfare and Tax respectively.

Subcommittee	Chair	Ranking Member
Health	Vern Buchanan (R-FL)	Lloyd Doggett (D–TX)
Oversight	David Schweikert (R-AZ)	Terri Sewell (D-AL)
Social Security	Ron Estes (R-KS)	John B. Larson (D-CT)
Tax	Mike Kelly (R-PA)	Mike Thompson (D-CA)
Trade	Adrian Smith (R-NE)	Linda Sánchez (D-CA)
Work and Welfare	Darin LaHood (R-IL)	Danny Davis (D–IL)

== Leadership ==
Chairs
Name	Party	State	Start	End
Thomas Fitzsimons	Pro-Administration	PA	1789	1789
William Smith	Federalist	SC	1794	1797
Robert Harper	Federalist	SC	1797	1800
Roger Griswold	Federalist	CT	1800	1801
John Randolph	Democratic-Republican	VA	1801	1805
Joseph Clay	Democratic-Republican	PA	1805	1807
George Campbell	Democratic-Republican	TN	1807	1809
John Eppes	Democratic-Republican	VA	1809	1811
Ezekiel Bacon	Democratic-Republican	MA	1811	1812
Langdon Cheves	Democratic-Republican	SC	1812	1813
John Eppes	Democratic-Republican	VA	1813	1815
William Lowndes	Democratic-Republican	SC	1815	1818
Samuel Smith	Democratic-Republican	MD	1818	1822
Louis McLane	Federalist	DE	1822	1827
John Randolph	Democratic	VA	1827	1827
George McDuffie	Democratic	SC	1827	1832
Gulian Verplanck	Democratic	NY	1832	1833
James Polk	Democratic	TN	1833	1835
Churchill Cambreleng	Democratic	NY	1835	1839
John Jones	Democratic	VA	1839	1841
Millard Fillmore	Whig	NY	1841	1843
James McKay	Democratic	NC	1843	1847
Samuel Vinton	Whig	OH	1847	1849
Thomas Bayly	Democratic	VA	1849	1851
George Houston	Democratic	AL	1851	1855
Lewis Campbell	Republican	OH	1856	1857
Glancy Jones	Democratic	PA	1857	1858
John Phelps	Democratic	MO	1858	1859
John Sherman	Republican	OH	1860	1861
Thaddeus Stevens	Republican	PA	1861	1865
Justin Morrill	Republican	VT	1865	1867
Robert Schenck	Republican	OH	1867	1871
Samuel Hooper	Republican	MA	1871	1871
Henry Dawes	Republican	MA	1871	1875
William Morrison	Democratic	IL	1875	1877
Fernando Wood	Democratic	NY	1877	1881
John Tucker	Democratic	VA	1881	1881
William Kelley	Republican	PA	1881	1883
William Morrison	Democratic	IL	1883	1887
Roger Mills	Democratic	TX	1887	1889
William McKinley	Republican	OH	1889	1891
William Springer	Democratic	IL	1891	1893
William Wilson	Democratic	WV	1893	1895
Nelson Dingley	Republican	ME	1895	1899
Sereno Payne	Republican	NY	1899	1911
Oscar Underwood	Democratic	AL	1911	1915
Claude Kitchin	Democratic	NC	1915	1919
Joseph Fordney	Republican	MI	1919	1923
William Green	Republican	IA	1923	1928
Willis Hawley	Republican	OR	1928	1931
James Collier	Democratic	MS	1931	1933
Robert Doughton	Democratic	NC	1933	1947
Harold Knutson	Republican	MN	1947	1949
Robert Doughton	Democratic	NC	1949	1953
Daniel Reed	Republican	NY	1953	1955
Jere Cooper	Democratic	TN	1955	1957
Wilbur Mills	Democratic	AR	1957	1974
Al Ullman	Democratic	OR	1974	1981
Dan Rostenkowski	Democratic	IL	1981	1994
Sam Gibbons; Acting	Democratic	FL	1994	1995
Bill Archer	Republican	TX	1995	2001
Bill Thomas	Republican	CA	2001	2007
Charles Rangel	Democratic	NY	2007	2010
Pete Stark; Acting	Democratic	CA	2010	
Sander Levin	Democratic	MI	2010	2011
Dave Camp	Republican	MI	2011	2015
Paul Ryan	Republican	WI	2015	2015
Kevin Brady	Republican	TX	2015	2019
Richard Neal	Democratic	MA	2019	2023
Jason Smith	Republican	MO	2023	present

Ranking members
Name	Party	State	Start	End
George Pendleton	Democratic	OH	1863	1865
James Brooks	Democratic	NY	1866	1866
John Hogan	Democratic	MO	1866	1867
James Brooks	Democratic	NY	1867	1873
James Beck	Democratic	KY	1873	1875
James Blaine	Republican	ME	1875	1876
William Kelley	Republican	PA	1876	1879
James Garfield	Republican	OH	1879	1880
William Kelley	Republican	PA	1880	1881
Samuel Randall	Democratic	PA	1881	1883
William Kelley	Republican	PA	1883	1889
John Carlisle	Democratic	KY	1889	1890
Roger Mills	Democratic	TX	1890	1891
Thomas Reed	Republican	ME	1891	1895
Charles Crisp	Democratic	GA	1895	1896
Benton McMillin	Democratic	TN	1896	1897
Joseph Bailey	Democratic	TX	1897	1899
James Richardson	Democratic	TN	1899	1903
John Williams	Democratic	MS	1903	1907
Champ Clark	Democratic	MO	1907	1911
Sereno Payne	Republican	NY	1911	1914
Joseph Fordney	Republican	MI	1914	1919
Claude Kitchin	Democratic	NC	1919	1923
Jack Garner	Democratic	TX	1923	1931
Willis Hawley	Republican	OR	1931	1933
Allen Treadway	Republican	MA	1933	1945
Harold Knutson	Republican	MN	1945	1947
Robert Doughton	Democratic	NC	1947	1949
Daniel Reed	Republican	NY	1949	1953
Jere Cooper	Democratic	TN	1953	1955
Daniel Reed	Republican	NY	1955	1959
Richard Simpson	Republican	PA	1959	1960
Noah Mason	Republican	IL	1960	1963
John Byrnes	Republican	WI	1963	1973
Herman Schneebeli	Republican	PA	1973	1977
Barber Conable	Republican	NY	1977	1985
John Duncan	Republican	TN	1985	1988
Bill Archer	Republican	TX	1988	1995
Sam Gibbons	Democratic	FL	1995	1997
Charlie Rangel	Democratic	NY	1997	2007
Jim McCrery	Republican	LA	2007	2009
Dave Camp	Republican	MI	2009	2011
Sander Levin	Democratic	MI	2011	2017
Richard Neal	Democratic	MA	2017	2019
Kevin Brady	Republican	TX	2019	2023
Richard Neal	Democratic	MA	2023	present

== Historical membership rosters ==
Majority	Minority
Jason Smith, Missouri, Chair; Vern Buchanan, Florida, Vice Chair; Adrian Smith, Nebraska; Mike Kelly, Pennsylvania; David Schweikert, Arizona; Darin LaHood, Illinois; Brad Wenstrup, Ohio; Jodey Arrington, Texas; Drew Ferguson, Georgia; Ron Estes, Kansas; Lloyd Smucker, Pennsylvania; Kevin Hern, Oklahoma; Carol Miller, West Virginia; Greg Murphy, North Carolina; David Kustoff, Tennessee; Brian Fitzpatrick, Pennsylvania; Greg Steube, Florida; Claudia Tenney, New York; Michelle Fischbach, Minnesota; Blake Moore, Utah; Michelle Steel, California; Beth Van Duyne, Texas; Randy Feenstra, Iowa; Nicole Malliotakis, New York; Mike Carey, Ohio	Richard Neal, Massachusetts, Ranking Member; Lloyd Doggett, Texas; Mike Thompson, California; John B. Larson, Connecticut; Earl Blumenauer, Oregon; Bill Pascrell, New Jersey (until August 21, 2024); Danny Davis, Illinois; Linda Sánchez, California; Brian Higgins, New York (until February 2, 2024); Terri Sewell, Alabama; Suzan DelBene, Washington; Judy Chu, California, Vice Ranking Member; Gwen Moore, Wisconsin; Dan Kildee, Michigan; Don Beyer, Virginia; Dwight Evans, Pennsylvania; Brad Schneider, Illinois; Jimmy Panetta, California; Jimmy Gomez, California (from February 6, 2024); Steven Horsford, Nevada (from September 10, 2024)

Resolutions electing members: H.Res. 14 (chair), H.Res. 15 (Ranking Member), H.Res. 56 (R), H.Res. 57 (D), H.Res. 999 (Gomez), H.Res. 1431 (Horsford)

Subcommittees

Subcommittee	Chair	Ranking Member
Health	Vern Buchanan (R-FL)	Lloyd Doggett (D–TX)
Oversight	David Schweikert (R-AZ)	Bill Pascrell (D-NJ) (until August 21, 2024); Linda Sánchez (D-CA) (from September 10, 2024)
Social Security	Drew Ferguson (R-GA)	John B. Larson (D-CT)
Tax	Mike Kelly (R-PA)	Mike Thompson (D-CA)
Trade	Adrian Smith (R-NE)	Earl Blumenauer (D-OR)
Work and Welfare	Darin LaHood (R-IL)	Danny K. Davis (D–IL)

=== 117th Congress ===
Majority	Minority
Richard Neal, Massachusetts, Chair; Lloyd Doggett, Texas; Mike Thompson, California; John B. Larson, Connecticut; Earl Blumenauer, Oregon; Ron Kind, Wisconsin; Bill Pascrell, New Jersey; Danny Davis, Illinois; Linda Sánchez, California; Brian Higgins, New York; Terri Sewell, Alabama; Suzan DelBene, Washington, Vice Chair; Judy Chu, California; Gwen Moore, Wisconsin; Dan Kildee, Michigan; Brendan Boyle, Pennsylvania; Don Beyer, Virginia; Dwight Evans, Pennsylvania; Brad Schneider, Illinois; Tom Suozzi, New York; Jimmy Panetta, California; Stephanie Murphy, Florida; Jimmy Gomez, California; Steven Horsford, Nevada; Stacey Plaskett, U.S. Virgin Islands	Kevin Brady, Texas, Ranking Member; Devin Nunes, California (until Jan. 3, 2022); Vern Buchanan, Florida; Adrian Smith, Nebraska; Tom Reed, New York (until May 10, 2022); Mike Kelly, Pennsylvania; Jason Smith, Missouri; Tom Rice, South Carolina; David Schweikert, Arizona; Jackie Walorski, Indiana (until Aug. 3, 2022); Darin LaHood, Illinois; Brad Wenstrup, Ohio; Jodey Arrington, Texas; Drew Ferguson, Georgia; Ron Estes, Kansas; Lloyd Smucker, Pennsylvania; Kevin Hern, Oklahoma; Carol Miller, West Virginia; Greg Murphy, North Carolina (from Jan. 19, 2022); David Kustoff, Tennessee (from June 8, 2022)

Resolutions electing members: H.Res. 9 (chair), H.Res. 10 (Ranking Member), H.Res. 62 (D), H.Res. 63 (R), H.Res. 875 (R), H.Res. 1159 (R)

Subcommittees

Subcommittee	Chair	Ranking Member
Health	Lloyd Doggett (D–TX)	Vern Buchanan (R–FL)
Oversight	Bill Pascrell (D-NJ)	Tom Rice (R-SC)
Select Revenue Measures	Mike Thompson (D-CA)	Mike Kelly (R–PA)
Social Security	John B. Larson (D-CT)	Tom Reed (R-NY)
Trade	Earl Blumenauer (D-OR)	Adrian Smith (R–NE)
Worker and Family Support	Danny Davis (D–IL)	Vacant

=== 116th Congress ===
Majority	Minority
Richard Neal, Massachusetts, Chair; Lloyd Doggett, Texas; Mike Thompson, California; John B. Larson, Connecticut; Earl Blumenauer, Oregon; Ron Kind, Wisconsin; Bill Pascrell, New Jersey; Danny Davis, Illinois; Linda Sánchez, California; Brian Higgins, New York; Terri Sewell, Alabama, Vice Chair; Suzan DelBene, Washington; Judy Chu, California; Gwen Moore, Wisconsin; Dan Kildee, Michigan; Brendan Boyle, Pennsylvania; Don Beyer, Virginia; Dwight Evans, Pennsylvania; Brad Schneider, Illinois; Tom Suozzi, New York; Jimmy Panetta, California; Stephanie Murphy, Florida; Jimmy Gomez, California; Steven Horsford, Nevada; Cedric Richmond, Louisiana (since September 22, 2020)	Kevin Brady, Texas, Ranking Member; Devin Nunes, California; Vern Buchanan, Florida; Adrian Smith, Nebraska; Kenny Marchant, Texas; Tom Reed, New York; Mike Kelly, Pennsylvania; George Holding, North Carolina; Jason Smith, Missouri; Tom Rice, South Carolina; David Schweikert, Arizona; Jackie Walorski, Indiana; Darin LaHood, Illinois; Brad Wenstrup, Ohio; Jodey Arrington, Texas; Drew Ferguson, Georgia; Ron Estes, Kansas

Resolutions electing members: H.Res. 7 (chair); H.Res. 8 (Ranking Member), H.Res. 42 (D), H.Res. 68 (R)

Subcommittee

Subcommittee	Chair	Ranking Member
Health	Lloyd Doggett (D–TX)	Devin Nunes (R–CA)
Worker and Family Support	Danny Davis (D–IL)	Jackie Walorski (R–IN)
Oversight	Bill Pascrell (D-NJ)	Mike Kelly (R–PA)
Select Revenue Measures	Mike Thompson (D-CA)	Adrian Smith (R–NE)
Social Security	John B. Larson (D-CT)	Tom Reed (R-NY)
Trade	Earl Blumenauer (D-OR)	Vern Buchanan (R–FL)

=== 115th Congress ===
Majority	Minority
Kevin Brady, Texas, Chair; Sam Johnson, Texas; Devin Nunes, California; Dave Reichert, Washington; Peter Roskam, Illinois; Vern Buchanan, Florida; Adrian Smith, Nebraska; Lynn Jenkins, Kansas; Erik Paulsen, Minnesota; Kenny Marchant, Texas; Diane Black, Tennessee; Tom Reed, New York; Mike Kelly, Pennsylvania; Jim Renacci, Ohio; Kristi Noem, South Dakota; George Holding, North Carolina; Jason Smith, Missouri; Tom Rice, South Carolina; David Schweikert, Arizona; Jackie Walorski, Indiana; Carlos Curbelo, Florida; Mike Bishop, Michigan; Darin LaHood, Illinois; Brad Wenstrup, Ohio	Richard Neal, Massachusetts, Ranking Member; Sander Levin, Michigan; John Lewis, Georgia; Lloyd Doggett, Texas; Mike Thompson, California; John B. Larson, Connecticut; Earl Blumenauer, Oregon; Ron Kind, Wisconsin; Bill Pascrell, New Jersey; Joseph Crowley, New York; Danny Davis, Illinois; Linda Sánchez, California; Brian Higgins, New York, Vice Ranking Member; Terri Sewell, Alabama; Suzan DelBene, Washington; Judy Chu, California

- Resolutions electing members: H.Res. 6 (chair); H.Res. 7 (Ranking Member); H.Res. 29, H.Res. 131, (R); H.Res. 45, H.Res. 95 (D)

== See also ==
- List of United States House of Representatives committees
- Trump v. Mazars USA, LLP

== Sources ==
- H. Doc. 100–244, The Committee on Ways and Means a Bicentennial History 1789-1989
