= Suzan DelBene =

American politician (born 1962)

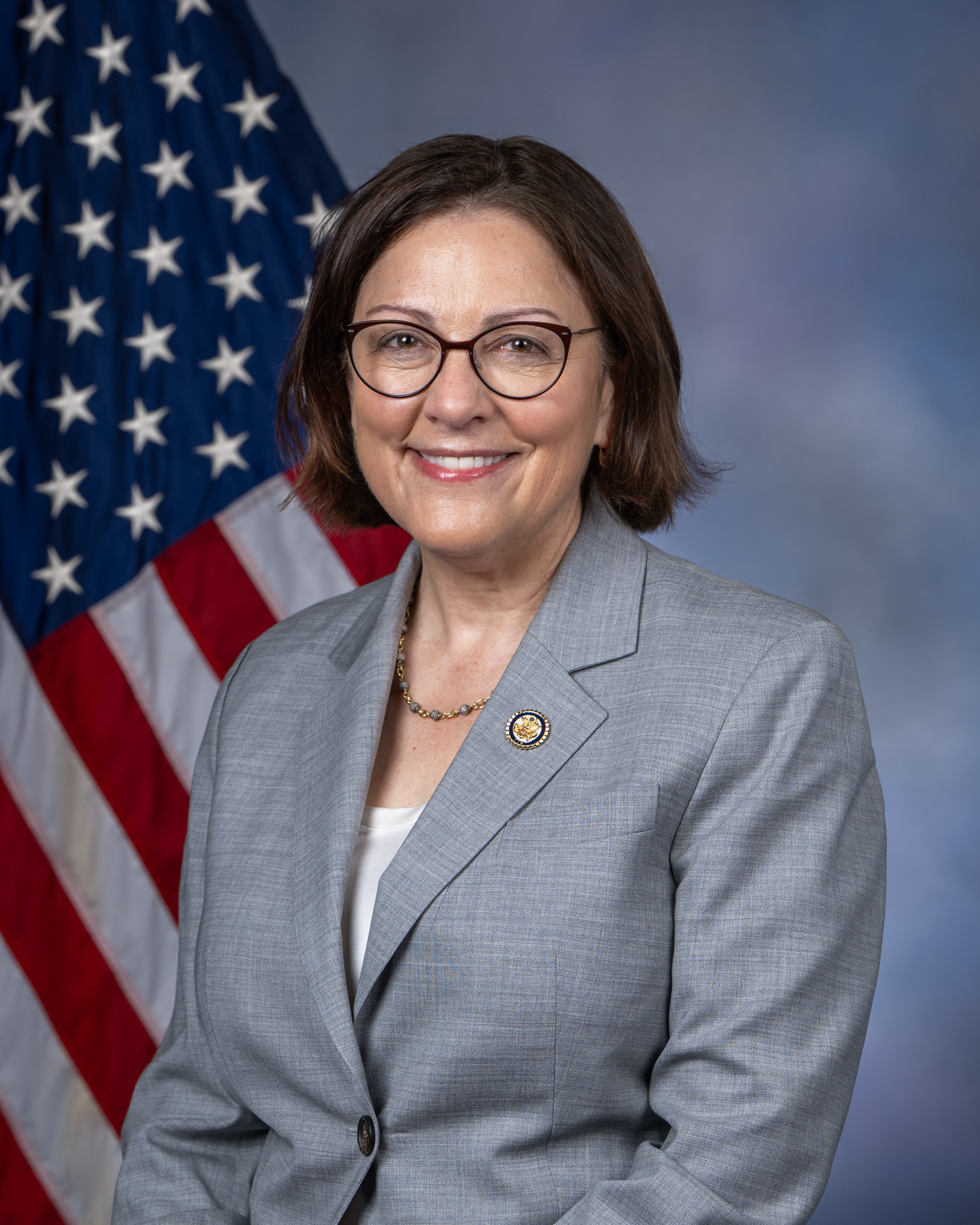
- Official portrait, 2026

Chair of the Democratic Congressional Campaign Committee
- Incumbent
- Assumed office January 3, 2023
- Leader: Hakeem Jeffries
- Preceded by: Sean Patrick Maloney

Chair of the New Democrat Coalition
- In office January 3, 2021 – January 3, 2023
- Preceded by: Derek Kilmer
- Succeeded by: Annie Kuster

Member of the U.S. House of Representatives from Washington's 1st district
- Incumbent
- Assumed office November 6, 2012 (Note: DelBene's official service begins on the date of the special election, while she was not sworn in until November 13, 2012.)
- Preceded by: Jay Inslee

Personal details
- Born: Suzan Kay Oliver; February 17, 1962 (age 64) Selma, Alabama, U.S.
- Party: Democratic
- Spouse: Kurt DelBene (m. 1997)
- Children: 2
- Education: Reed College (BS); University of Washington (MBA)
- Website: House website Campaign website
- DelBene's voice DelBene supporting the Email Privacy Act. Recorded April 27, 2016

Suzan Kay DelBene (née Oliver; /ˌdɛlˈbɛneɪ/ del-BEH-nay; born February 17, 1962) is an American politician and businesswoman who has been the United States representative for Washington's 1st congressional district since 2012.

DelBene was the 2010 Democratic nominee for U.S. representative for Washington's 8th congressional district and narrowly lost to incumbent Republican Dave Reichert. In 2012 she won the general election in Washington's redrawn 1st district against Republican John Koster, while simultaneously winning the election for the remainder of the term in the 1st district under the pre-2012 boundaries, a seat left vacant by the resignation of Jay Inslee.

DelBene is the chair of the Democratic Congressional Campaign Committee (DCCC) and is a former chair of the New Democrat Coalition.

== Early life and education ==
DelBene was born in Selma, Alabama, the fifth child of Barry and Beth Oliver. At a young age, her family moved to Newport Hills in Bellevue, Washington. Later they moved to Mercer Island. After fourth grade, her family moved around the country in search of work.

After graduating from The Choate School, a prep school in Wallingford, Connecticut, DelBene went to Reed College, where she earned a Bachelor of Science degree in biology. She then continued her education at the University of Washington, earning a Master of Business Administration degree.

== Business career ==
From 1989 to 1998 DelBene worked at Microsoft, where she was director of marketing and business development for the Interactive Media Group, marketing and sales training for Microsoft's Internet properties, and other business development and product management roles with Windows 95 and early versions of Microsoft's Internet Explorer Web browser. In 1998 she left to help found drugstore.com and serve as a vice president. In 2000, she became CEO of Nimble Technology, leading it through its acquisition by Actuate in 2003. In 2004, she returned to Microsoft as corporate vice president of the Mobile Communications Business until 2007. From 2008 to 2009, she was a management consultant and strategic advisor to Global Partnerships, a nonprofit supporting microfinance and sustainable solutions in Latin America. DelBene was named as the director for the Washington State Department of Revenue on November 30, 2010, replacing outgoing director Cindi Holmstrom.

== U.S. House of Representatives (2012-present) ==
=== Elections ===
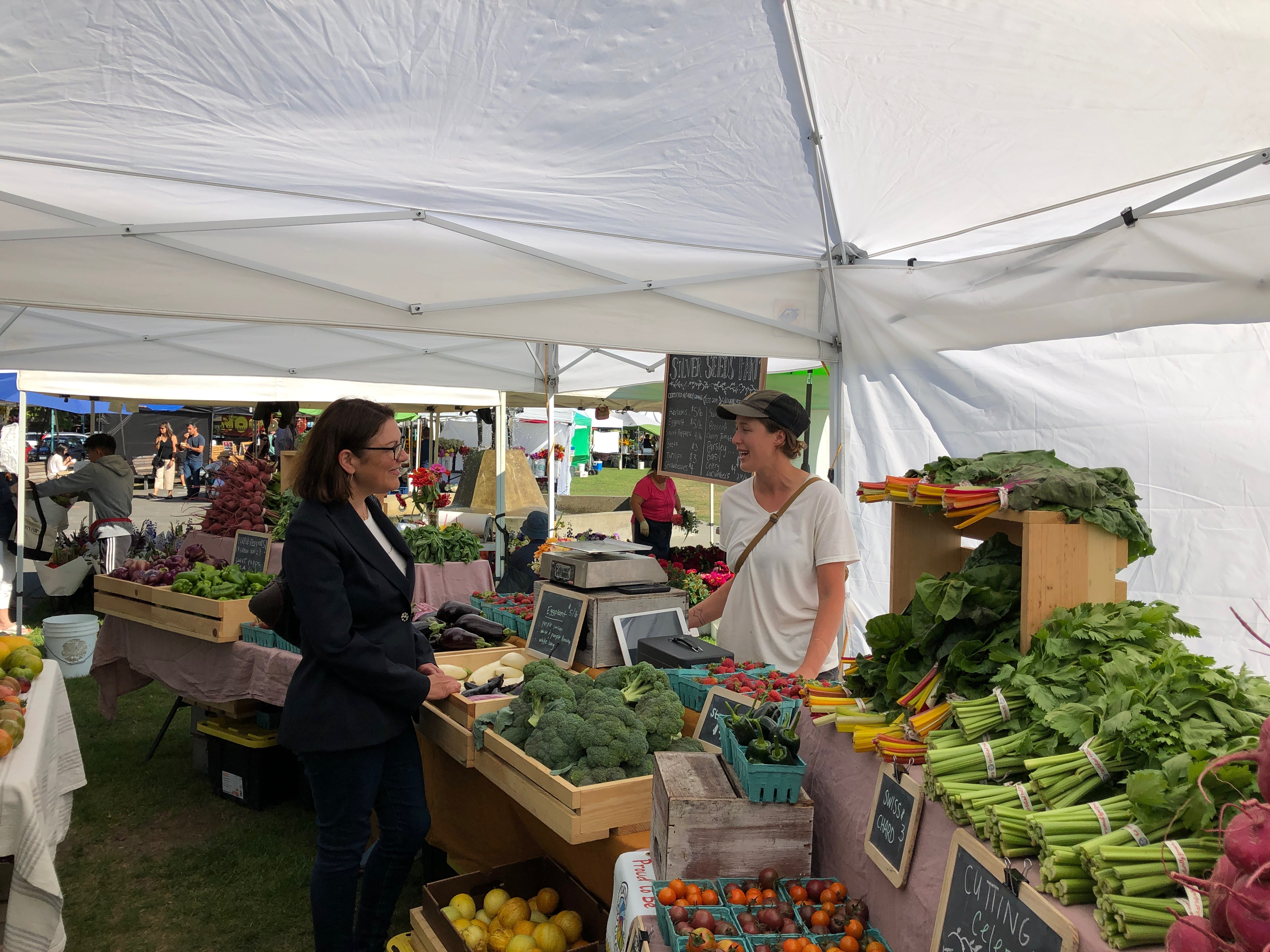
Congresswoman Suzan DelBene with a vendor at a farmer's market in Kirkland, Washington

==== 2010 ====
In 2010 DelBene ran for the U.S. House of Representatives as a Democrat against the incumbent in the 8th congressional district, Dave Reichert, a Republican. According to DelBene's campaign website, the economy was her top priority. She was endorsed by The Seattle Times and the Seattle Post-Intelligencer, as well as several Democratic politicians.

DelBene faced Reichert in the general election, after coming in 2nd in the primary voting. In Washington, the top two advance. She lost to Reichert in the general election on November 2. She was named Washington State Revenue Director by Governor Christine Gregoire on November 30.

==== 2012 ====
DelBene ran for Congress again in 2012. She won the Democratic nomination for the redrawn 1st district, previously represented by Jay Inslee, which became more competitive due to redistricting. Inslee had resigned in March to focus on his campaign for governor. DelBene ran in two elections that day against Republican John Koster—a special election for the last two months of Inslee's seventh term (held in the boundaries of the old 1st), and a regular election for a full two-year term. She defeated Koster in both, winning the special election with 60% of the vote and the regular election with 54%. Her victory margin in the regular election was wider than expected, considering that the district was about six points less Democratic than its predecessor. On November 13, she was sworn in as the district's representative for the remainder of the 112th Congress, giving her a leg up in seniority over all but a few other representatives first elected in November 2012 for the 113th Congress.

DelBene spent $2.8 million of her own money in a race in which she raised over $4 million, in a Congressional race that became the most expensive in Washington state history.

==== 2014 ====
DelBene defeated Republican nominee Pedro Celis with 55% of the vote.

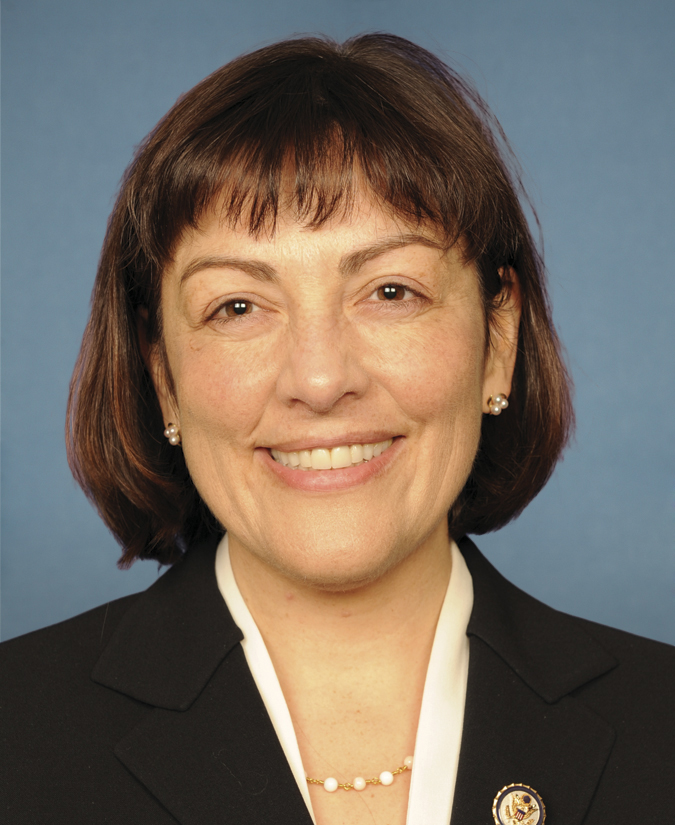
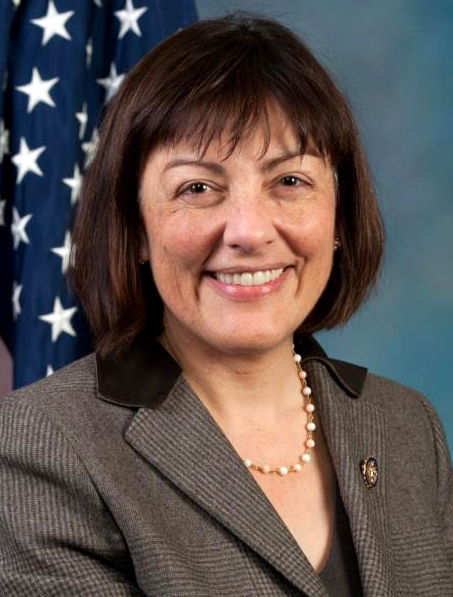
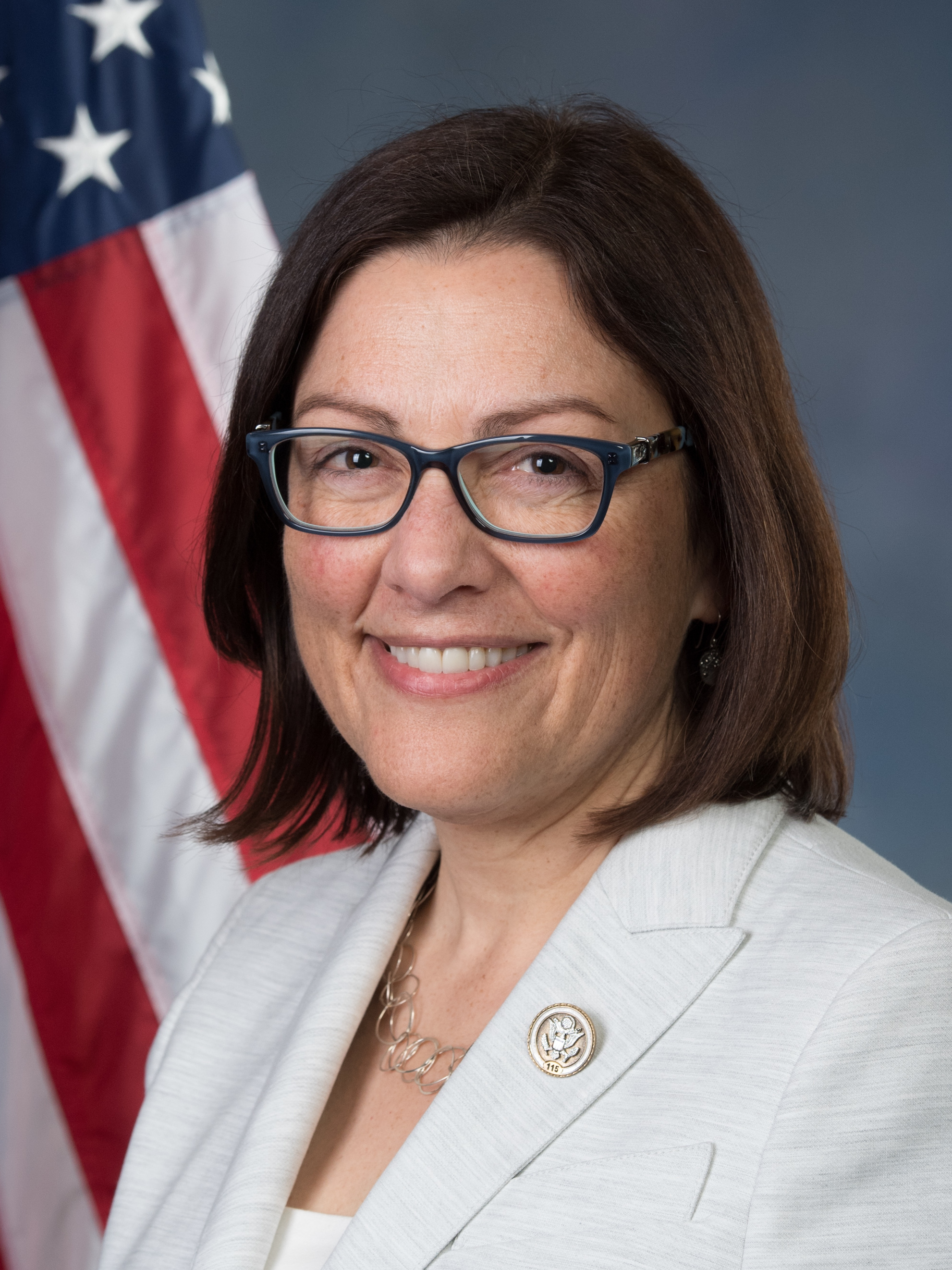
Delbene Congressional portraits

=== Committee assignments ===
For the 119th Congress:

- Committee on Ways and Means
  - Subcommittee on Oversight
  - Subcommittee on Tax
  - Subcommittee on Trade

=== Caucus memberships ===
- New Democrat Coalition
- Caucus on Virtual, Augmented and Mixed Reality Technologies (Co-Chair)
- Digital Trade Caucus (Co-Chair)
- Internet of Things (IoT) Caucus (Co-Chair)
- Congressional Kidney Caucus (Co-Chair)
- MedTech Caucus (Co-Chair)
- Congressional Caucus on Turkey and Turkish Americans
- Congressional Dairy Farmers Caucus (Co-Chair)
- Reality Caucus (Co-Chair)
- Women's High Tech Coalition (Co-Chair)
- Congressional Pro-Choice Caucus
- Congressional Arts Caucus
- Congressional Asian Pacific American Caucus
- Veterinary Medicine Caucus
- LGBTQ Equality Caucus
- Congressional Ukraine Caucus
- Diabetes Caucus
- Rare Disease Caucus
- U.S.-Japan Caucus

== Political positions ==
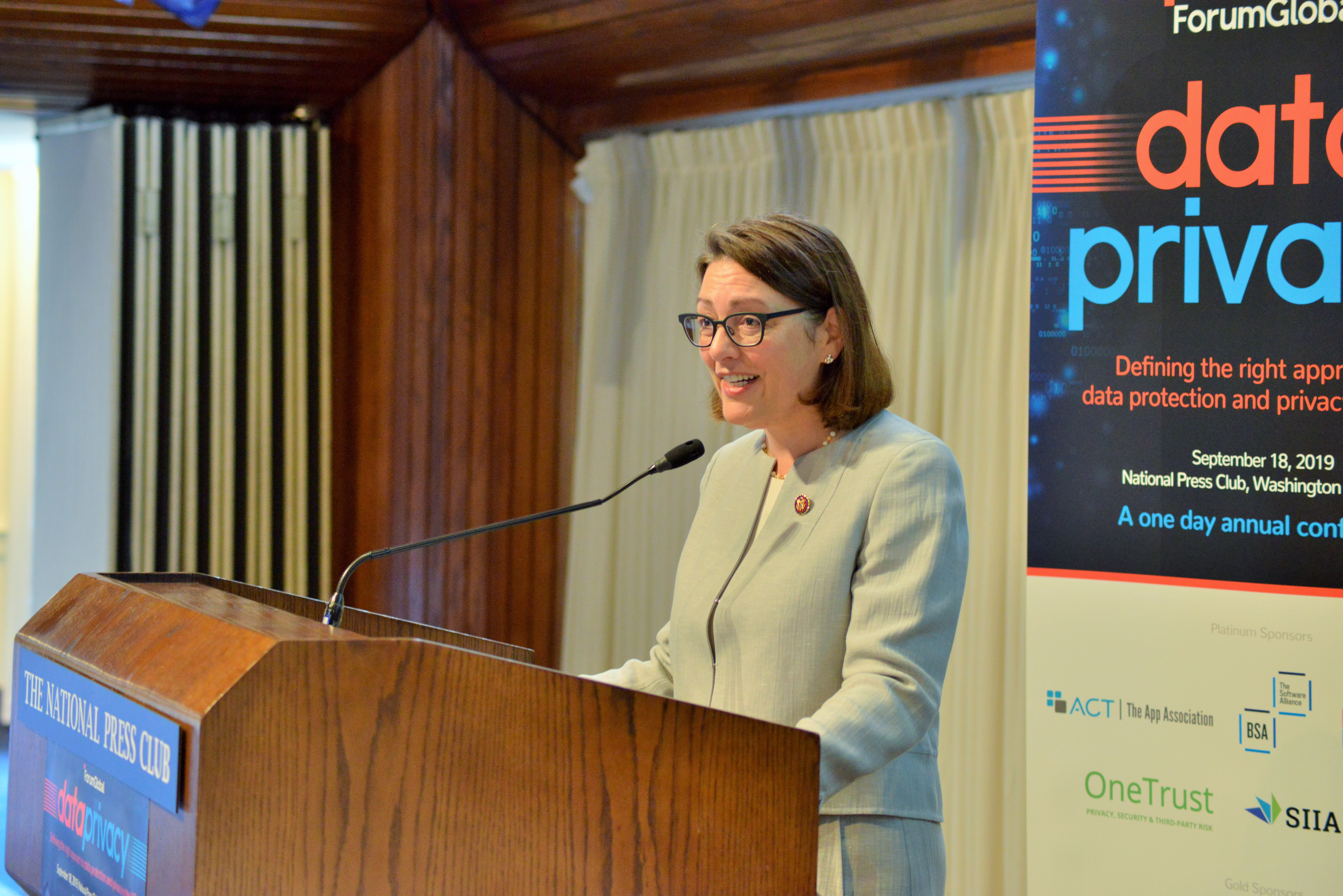
Congresswoman DelBene speaking at the 2019 Forum Global Data Privacy Conference

DelBene is one of the leaders of the Pro-Choice Caucus and supported access to reproductive health care by serving on the Select Committee to Investigate Planned Parenthood, which was established under former Speaker Paul Ryan in 2015.

DelBene voted to provide Israel with support following 2023 Hamas attack on Israel.

DelBene voted with President Joe Biden's stated position 100% of the time in the 117th Congress, according to a FiveThirtyEight analysis.

== Electoral history ==
Washington's 8th congressional district and Washington's 1st congressional district: Results 2010–2024
Year	Democratic	Votes	Pct	Republican	Votes	Pct	
2010	Suzan DelBene	148,581	48.0%	Dave Reichert (incumbent)	161,296	52.0%	
2012 (special)	Suzan DelBene	216,144	60.4%	John Koster	141,591	39.6%	
2012	Suzan DelBene	177,025	53.9%	John Koster	151,187	46.1%	
2014	Suzan DelBene	124,151	55.0%	Pedro Celis	101,428	45.0%	
2016	Suzan DelBene	193,619	55.4%	Robert J. Sutherland	155,779	44.6%	
2018	Suzan DelBene	197,209	59.3%	Jeffrey Beeler	135,534	40.7%	
2020	Suzan DelBene	249,944	58.6%	Jeffrey Beeler	176,407	41.3%	*
2022	Suzan DelBene	181,992	63.5%	Vincent Cavaleri	104,329	36.4%	*
2024	Suzan DelBene	227,213	63.0%	Jeb Brewer	132,538	36.7%	*

* Write-in and minor candidate notes: In 2020, write-ins received 511 votes. In 2022, write-ins received 363 votes. In 2024, write-ins received 907 votes.

== Personal life ==
DelBene is married to Kurt DelBene, who served as Assistant Secretary for Information and Technology and CIO at the Department of Veterans Affairs from November 2021 to January 2025. He was previously Chief Digital Officer and EVP of Corporate Strategy, Core Services Engineering and Operations at Microsoft Corporation, and led the effort to fix the Healthcare.gov website at President Barack Obama's request. The couple has two children.

DelBene is a practicing Episcopalian.

== See also ==
- Women in the United States House of Representatives

U.S. House of Representatives
Preceded by Jay Inslee	Member of the U.S. House of Representatives from Washington's 1st congressional district 2012–present	Incumbent
Party political offices
Preceded by Derek Kilmer	Chair of the New Democrat Coalition; 2021–2023	Succeeded by Annie Kuster
Preceded by Sean Patrick Maloney	Chair of the Democratic Congressional Campaign Committee; 2023–present	Incumbent
U.S. order of precedence (ceremonial)
Preceded by Suzanne Bonamici	United States representatives by seniority 95th	Succeeded by Thomas Massie
