= Mike Kelly (Pennsylvania politician) =

American politician (born 1948)

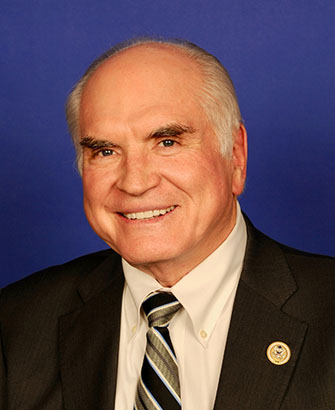
- Official portrait, 2018

Member of the U.S. House of Representatives from Pennsylvania
- Incumbent
- Assumed office January 3, 2011
- Preceded by: Kathy Dahlkemper
- Constituency: 3rd district (2011–2019); 16th district (2019–present)

Personal details
- Born: George Joseph Kelly Jr. May 10, 1948 (age 78) Pittsburgh, Pennsylvania, U.S.
- Party: Republican
- Spouse: Victoria Phillips
- Children: 4
- Education: University of Notre Dame (BA)
- Website: House website; Campaign website

George Joseph "Mike" Kelly Jr. (born May 10, 1948) is an American politician and businessman who has been a U.S. representative since 2011, currently representing Pennsylvania's 16th congressional district. The district, numbered as the 3rd district from 2011 to 2019, is based in Erie and stretches from the northwest corner of the state to the outer northern suburbs of Pittsburgh in Butler County. He is a member of the Republican Party.

On October 22, 2021, it was reported that a congressional ethics watchdog had recommended issuing a subpoena Kelly for an ethics violation after it was revealed that his wife had purchased stock in an Ohio-based steel company in April 2020 after Kelly had received confidential information about the company. In June 2022, Senator Ron Johnson accused Kelly of providing a slate of fake electors meant to overturn Pennsylvania's electoral votes in the 2020 election. Kelly's office has denied his role in this event.

== Early life and education ==
Kelly was born on May 10, 1948, in Pittsburgh, but has spent most of his life in Butler. He attended the University of Notre Dame.

== Business career ==
=== Automotive business ===
After college, Kelly worked for his father's Chevrolet/Cadillac car dealership. In 1995, he took over the business, and added Hyundai and KIA to its lineup.

In March 2019, a local TV station discovered that 17 vehicles were for sale on Kelly's Uniontown and Butler lots that were the subject of recall notices but had not been repaired. The station contacted both the businesses and Kelly's office without receiving responses. A month later, a reporter found three of those vehicles with active recalls still for sale. In November 2015, Kelly had spoken on the floor of Congress in support of a bill that would have allowed dealers to loan or rent vehicles despite National Highway Traffic Safety Administration (NHTSA) safety recall notices on them. Kelly had said, "There is not a single person in our business that would ever put one of our owners in a defective car or a car with a recall. But that could happen." The bill did not pass.

Kelly's car dealerships received Paycheck Protection Program loans of between $450,000 and $1.05 million to keep staff on the payroll during the coronavirus pandemic. The figure was later estimated to be a combined amount of $974,100. The loan program was primarily intended to protect employee pay during the COVID-19 pandemic. The loans were eventually forgiven, and Kelly was scrutinized for receiving the loan while serving as a member of Congress, though he denied any wrongdoing.

== U.S. House of Representatives ==
=== Committees and caucuses ===
Kelly has served on the U.S. House of Representatives' Ways & Means Committee since 2013. He currently chairs the Subcommittee on Tax and is a member of the Subcommittee on Health. He previously served as the top Republican on the Committee's Subcommittee on Oversight.

Kelly belongs to more than 20 caucuses in the U.S. House of Representatives. He chairs or co-chairs several prominent caucuses, including the following:

- Congressional Cancer Caucus
- Congressional Caucus on Korea
- Congressional Childhood Cancer Caucus
- Friends of Ireland Caucus
- House Automotive Caucus
- House Small Brewers Caucus
- Northern Border Security Caucus
- United States–China Working Group

=== Elections ===
==== 2010 ====
Kelly challenged incumbent Representative Kathy Dahlkemper in 2010. He won the election 55.7%–44.3%, largely by running up his margins outside of heavily Democratic Erie.

==== 2012 ====
Kelly defeated Democrat Missa Eaton 54.8%–41.0%. His district had been made slightly friendlier in redistricting. The district was pushed slightly south, absorbing some rural and Republican territory east of Pittsburgh. At the same time, eastern Erie County was drawn into the heavily Republican 5th district. The 3rd and 5th were drawn so that the boundary between the two districts was almost coextensive with the eastern boundary of the city of Erie.

==== 2014 ====
Kelly defeated Democrat Dan LaVallee of Cranberry Township 60.6%–39.4%.

==== 2016 ====
Kelly ran unopposed and received 100% of the vote.

==== 2018 ====
After the Pennsylvania Supreme Court threw out Pennsylvania's original congressional map in February 2018, Kelly's district was renumbered the 16th and made slightly more compact. It regained the eastern portion of Erie County that had been drawn into the 5th. To make up for the increase in population, its southern portion was pushed to the west, leaving Kelly's hometown of Butler just barely inside the district.

PoliticsPA wrote that the new 16th was far less safe for Kelly than the old 3rd, citing a Public Policy Polling poll showing him leading Democratic nominee Ron DiNicola 48% to 43%, below the threshold to be considered safe for a fourth term. Additionally, while Trump carried the old 3rd with 61% of the vote, he would have carried the new 16th with 58% of the vote. Nate Cohn of The New York Times suggested that Kelly would have been in more danger had the 16th absorbed more Democratic-leaning territory northwest of Pittsburgh. Ultimately, much of this territory had been drawn into the reconfigured 17th district (the former 12th district).

Kelly defeated DiNicola 51.5%–47.3%, his first close contest since his initial run for the seat.

==== 2020 ====
Kelly defeated Democrat Kristy Gnibus of Erie 59.3%–40.7%, an improvement over his performance in 2018. He received 210,088 votes to Gnibus's 143,962.

==== 2022 ====
Kelly defeated Democrat Dan Pastore of Erie 59.4%–40.6%. Kelly received 190,564 votes, while Pastore received 130,443.

==== 2024 ====
Kelly defeated Democrat Preston Nouri 63.7%–36.3%. Kelly received 256,923 votes, while Nouri received 146,709.

=== Committee assignments ===
- Committee on Ways and Means
  - Subcommittee on Tax (Chairman)
  - Subcommittee on Health

=== Caucus memberships ===
- Congressional Taiwan Caucus
- Northeast-Midwest Congressional Coalition
- Republican Study Committee

=== Tenure ===
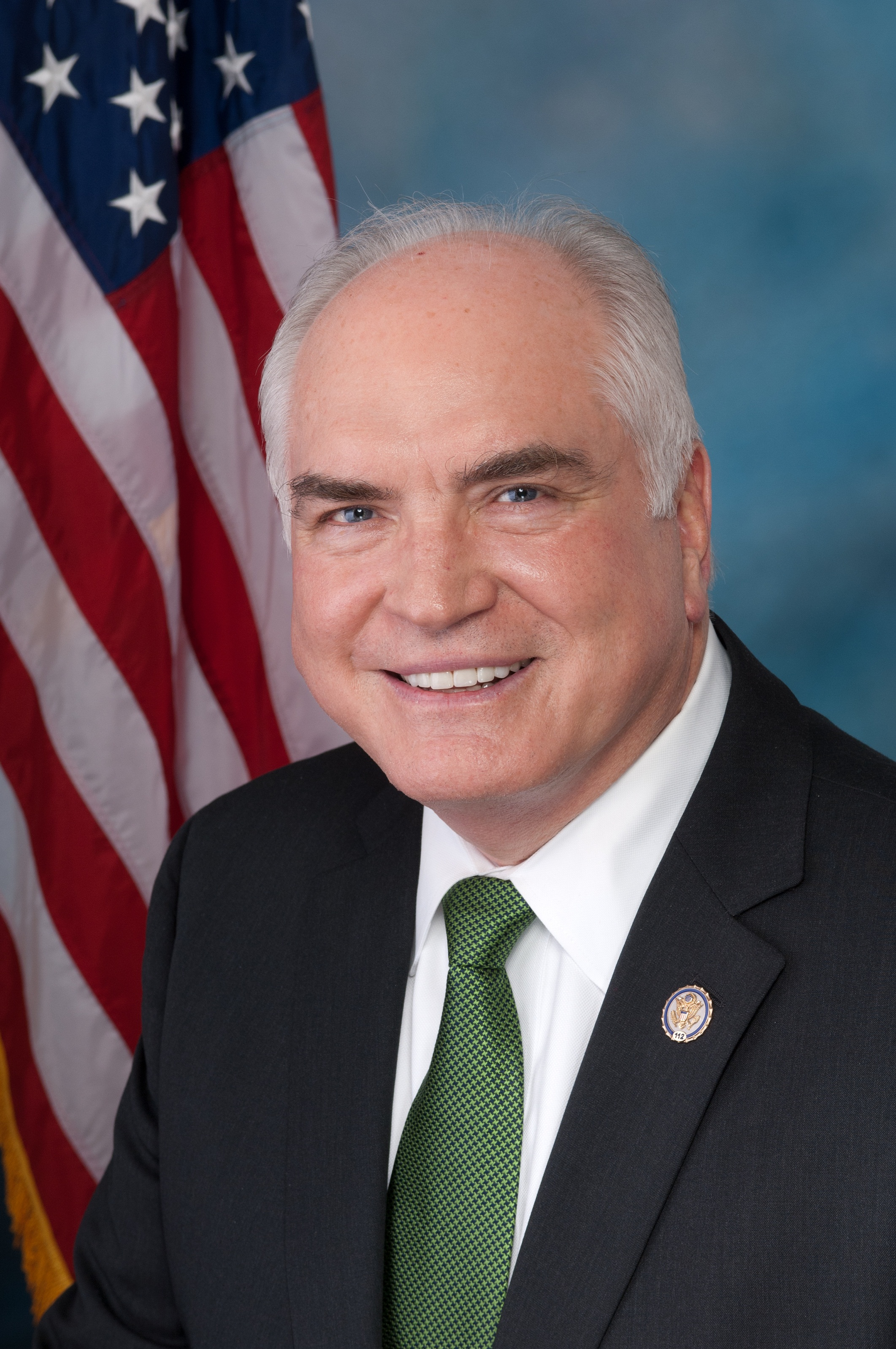
Kelly during the 112th Congress, 2011

==== Conservative Political Action Conference attendance ====
In February 2021, Kelly and a dozen other Republican House members skipped votes and enlisted others to vote for them, citing the ongoing COVID-19 pandemic. But he and the other members were actually attending the Conservative Political Action Conference, which was held at the same time as their absences. In response, the Campaign for Accountability, an ethics watchdog group, filed a complaint with the House Committee on Ethics and requested an investigation into Kelly and the other lawmakers.

==== Debt forgiveness ====
During the COVID-19 pandemic, Kelly's auto dealerships received loans from U.S. taxpayers of over $970,000 as part of the Paycheck Protection Program (PPP); the loans were later forgiven. U.S. Representative Katie Porter later introduced legislation that would require all loans under the PPP to be made public. Kelly voted against the TRUTH Act (H.R. 6782), a bill that would have required public disclosure of companies that received funds through the bailout program. As of August 2022, Kelly opposes President Joe Biden's proposal to forgive $10,000 of student debt for individuals making up to $125,000 per year. Kelly's net worth was estimated to be $12.4 million in 2018.

==== "Deep state" conspiracy theories ====
When speaking at a Mercer County Republican Party event in 2017, Kelly advanced the conspiracy theory that former president Barack Obama was running a "shadow government" to undermine President Trump. When asked about these remarks, Kelly said they were meant to be private. After the remarks made national news, Kelly's spokesperson said that Kelly did not believe that Obama "is personally operating a shadow government".

==== Donald Trump ====
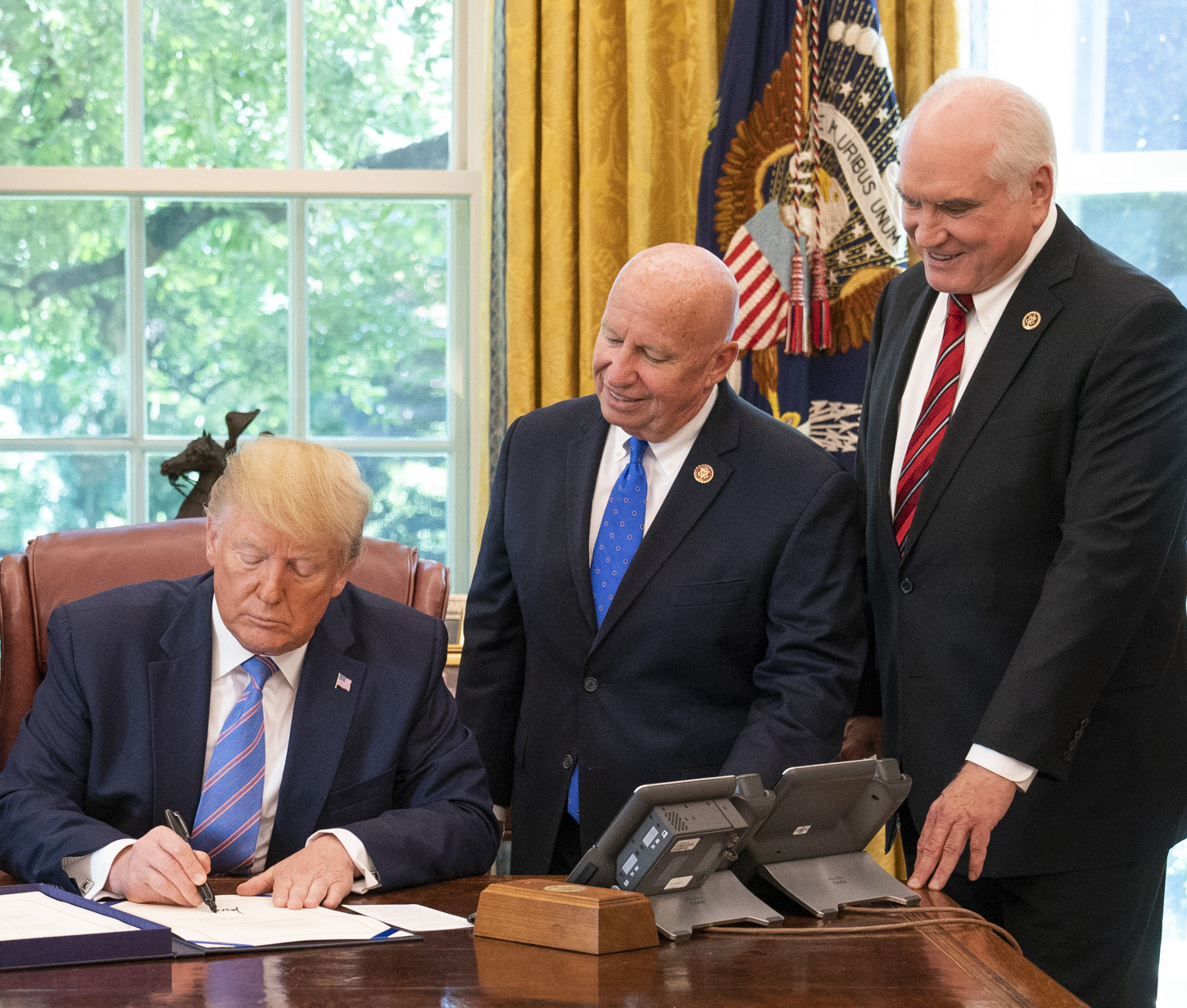
Kelly with President Trump as he signs the Taxpayer First Act into law

Kelly has argued against the release of Trump's tax returns by the House Ways and Means Committee.

In December 2019, Kelly likened Trump's first impeachment to the attack on Pearl Harbor. He said the date on which Trump was impeached is "another date that will live in infamy", referring to President Franklin Roosevelt's statement about the Pearl Harbor attack.

Amid ballot counting in the 2020 election, Kelly filed a lawsuit to stop Pennsylvania from allowing voters to "cure" (alter) their ballots. After Biden won Pennsylvania, Kelly filed a suit arguing that all mail-in ballots cast in the state (more than 2.5 million) should be discarded, which would result in flipping the state to Trump, or if that was not possible, that the electors for president should instead be chosen by the legislature. If successful, this suit would have invalidated millions of votes in the Pennsylvania election. On November 28, 2020, the Pennsylvania Supreme Court unanimously rejected Kelly's suit, additionally ruling to "dismiss with prejudice."

In December 2020, Kelly was one of 126 Republican members of the House of Representatives to sign an amicus brief in support of Texas v. Pennsylvania, a lawsuit filed at the United States Supreme Court contesting the results of the 2020 presidential election, in which Biden defeated Trump. The Supreme Court declined to hear the case on the basis that Texas lacked standing under Article III of the Constitution to challenge the results of an election held by another state.

In July 2024, following the attempted assassination of Donald Trump in Kelly's hometown, Kelly initially released a post that stated "We will not tolerate this attack from the left," The post was subsequently deleted. Kelly introduced a resolution to formally call for a bipartisan House task force to investigate the incident. Kelly was then selected to chair the task force investigating the assassination attempt.

In September 2024, a few weeks before the 2024 United States presidential election, Kelly joined other Pennsylvania Republican members of Congress in filing a lawsuit that would institute new identification checks on voting for soldiers, sailors, and other residents of the state casting overseas ballots. The lawsuit was dismissed by a federal judge who contended that the lawsuit was filed too close to Election Day and declared concerns that were merely "hypothetical."

==== Economy ====
In March 2021, all House Republicans including Kelly voted against the American Rescue Plan Act of 2021, a $1.9 trillion coronavirus relief bill.

==== Healthcare ====
On August 1, 2012, Kelly called the HHS contraceptive mandate of the Patient Protection and Affordable Care Act, requiring employer coverage of contraceptives, an attack on religious rights and said that August 1, 2012, would go down in infamy as "the day that religious freedom died".

==== Immigration ====
In 2026, Kelly cosponsored the DIGNIDAD Act, which proposes a pathway to legal status for up to 12 million illegal immigrants, paired with stricter border enforcement and mandatory work and restitution requirements.

==== October 2023 House Speaker election ====
In 2023, Kelly was one of 18 Republicans who voted against Jim Jordan's nomination for Speaker of the House all three times.

==== Surveillance ====
In January 2026, Kelly was one of 57 Republicans who voted against blocking funding for federally driven “kill switch” vehicle technology, allowing regulators to move forward with systems that could monitor drivers and intervene in vehicle operation.

==== LGBT rights ====
In 2015, Kelly cosponsored the Federal Marriage Amendment. In 2022, he voted against the Respect for Marriage Act, which enshrined same-sex marriage into federal law.

==== Financial disclosures ====
In September 2021, Business Insider reported that Kelly had violated the Stop Trading on Congressional Knowledge (STOCK) Act of 2012, a federal transparency and conflict-of-interest law, by failing to properly disclose a purchase of stock in Beauty Health Company made by his wife worth between $1,001 and $15,000.

==== Town halls ====
Kelly has not held an in-person, open-floor town hall since 2011.

== Awards and honors ==
In Kelly's time in Congress, he has independently sponsored three pieces of legislature that have become law: renaming a post office and renaming two facilities at the Department of Veterans Affairs (all located in Butler, PA).

In three consecutive Congresses, Kelly landed in the top one-third of most bipartisan members, according to The Lugar Center and Georgetown University's McCourt School of Public Policy.

From 2018 to 2020, Kelly and his staff were named finalists for the Congressional Management Foundation's Constituent Service Award.

== Personal life ==
Kelly lives in Butler, Pennsylvania with his wife Victoria. They have four children and ten grandchildren. He is the brother-in-law of retired Congressman Phil Roe of Tennessee's 1st congressional district. He is a practicing Roman Catholic.

In 2019, he said that, as a person of Irish and Anglo-Saxon descent, he considers himself a person of color—a term often used to describe people of nonwhite backgrounds.

U.S. House of Representatives
Preceded by Kathy Dahlkemper	Member of the U.S. House of Representatives from Pennsylvania's 3rd congressional district 2011–2019	Succeeded by Dwight Evans
Preceded by Lloyd Smucker	Member of the U.S. House of Representatives from Pennsylvania's 16th congressional district 2019–present	Incumbent
New office	Chair of the House Trump Assassination Attempt Task Force; 2024–2025	Position abolished
U.S. order of precedence (ceremonial)
Preceded by Bill Keating	United States representatives by seniority 86th	Succeeded by David Schweikert
