= DPHS =

DPHS, in the United States, may stand for:

- Deer Park High School (disambiguation):
  - Deer Park Junior/Senior High School, Cincinnati, Ohio
  - Deer Park High School (New York), Deer Park, New York, on Long Island
  - Deer Park High School (Texas), in the Deer Park Independent School District, Deer Park, Texas
- Dr. Phillips High School, Orlando, Florida
- Dos Pueblos High School Goleta, California
- De Pere High School, a senior high school in De Pere, Wisconsin
