= 2018 Texas elections =

- November 6, 2018

Elections were held in Texas on November 6, 2018. All of Texas's executive officers were up for election as well as a United States Senate seat, and all of Texas's 36 seats in the United States House of Representatives. The Republican and Democratic Parties nominated their candidates by primaries held on March 6, 2018. Convention parties nominated their candidates at a series of conventions. County conventions were held on March 17, 2018; district conventions were held on March 24, 2018; and a state convention was held on April 14, 2018. There is currently only one convention party in Texas, the Libertarian Party. Other parties may seek to achieve ballot access.

Turnout in the November general election reached historic levels, rivaling turnout in a presidential election. While the Republican Party won every statewide position, the margin of victory was narrower than in previous elections.

== Federal ==
=== United States Senate ===
Democratic U.S. Representative Beto O'Rourke and Libertarian candidate Neal Dikeman challenged U.S. Senator Ted Cruz for re-election. Cruz narrowly defeated O'Rourke by 2.6%.

=== United States House of Representatives ===
All of Texas's 36 seats in the United States House of Representatives were up for election in 2018. No open seats changed hands, but two Republican incumbents lost to Democrats.

== Executive ==
=== Governor ===
Incumbent governor Greg Abbott ran for a second term. He was first elected in 2014 after serving twelve years as Texas Attorney General, and he succeeded Rick Perry as governor.

Abbott won the March 20, 2018, Republican primary, while Lupe Valdez won the Democratic runoff against Andrew White, becoming the first Latina nominated by a major party for statewide office in Texas.

Libertarian Mark Tippetts also ran against Abbott. Tippetts defeated Kathie Glass, Patrick "Not Governor" Smith, and Kory Watkins at the party convention to earn his nomination.

=== Lieutenant governor ===
Incumbent Lieutenant governor Dan Patrick ran for a second term, having first been elected in 2014.

In the Republican primary, Patrick easily dispatched his primary challengers for the Republican nomination.

In the Democratic primary, Mike Collier narrowly defeated Michael Cooper for the Democratic nomination.

Patrick would go on to win a second term in the general election, but by a significantly reduced margin from his first run. His margin was likely pulled down due to the national environment favoring Democrats while President Trump was in office and a strong candidacy by Democrat Beto O'Rourke at the top of the ticket against Senator Ted Cruz.

=== Comptroller of Public Accounts ===
Incumbent Republican comptroller Glenn Hegar ran for re-election to a second term.

=== Commissioner of the General Land Office ===
2018 Texas Land Commissioner election
- November 6, 2018
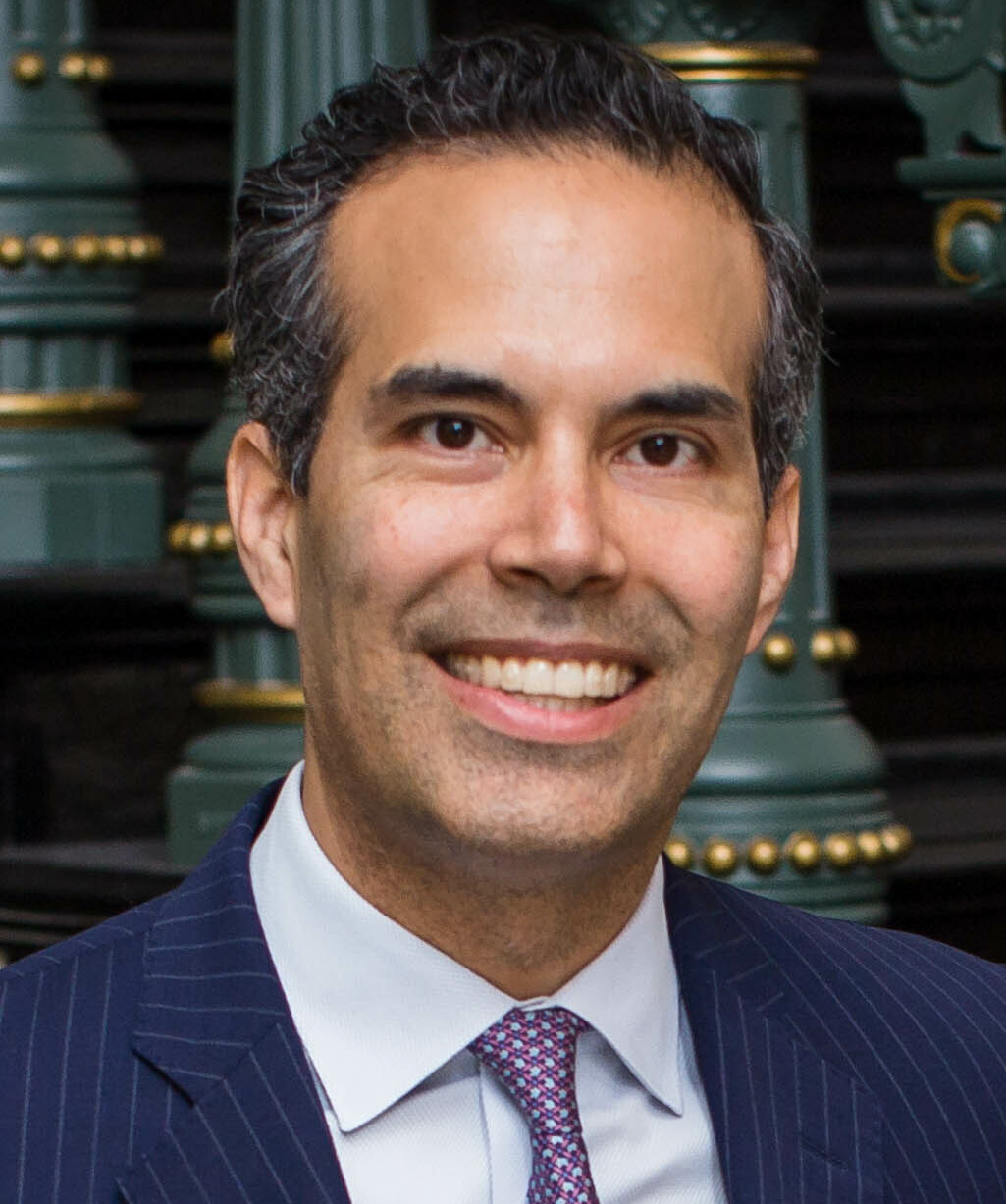

Nominee	George P. Bush	Miguel Suazo
Party	Republican	Democratic
Popular vote	4,435,202	3,567,927
Percentage	53.7%	43.2%
- County results Bush: 40–50% 50–60% 60–70% 70–80% 80–90% >90% Suazo: 40–50% 50–60% 60–70% 70–80%
Land Commissioner before election
George P. Bush
Republican
Elected Land Commissioner
George P. Bush
Republican

==== Republican primary ====
===== Candidates =====
- George P. Bush, incumbent Commissioner of the General Land Office
- Davey Edwards, professional land surveyor
- Jerry E. Patterson, former Commissioner of the General Land Office (2003–2015)
- Rick Range, retired teacher and firefighter

===== Results =====
Republican primary results
Party	Candidate	Votes	%
Republican	George P. Bush (incumbent)	856,512	58.22%
Republican	Jerry Patterson	439,602	29.67%
Republican	Davey Edwards	101,359	6.84%
Republican	Rick Range	78,124	5.27%
Total votes		1,481,597	100.0%

==== Democratic primary ====
===== Candidates =====
- Tex Morgan, software engineer, former member of VIA Metropolitan Transit board
- Miguel Suazo, energy and natural resources attorney

===== Results =====
Democratic primary results
Party	Candidate	Votes	%
Democratic	Miguel Suazo	665,344	70.15%
Democratic	Tex Morgan	283,096	29.85%
Total votes		948,440	100.0%

==== Libertarian state convention ====
===== Candidates =====
- Matt Piña

==== General election ====
===== Endorsements =====
George P. Bush

Presidents of the United States

- George H. W. Bush, 41st president of the United States
- Donald Trump, 45th president of the United States

===== Polling =====
Poll source	Date(s) administered	Sample size	Margin of error	George P. Bush (R)	Miguel Suazo (D)	Matt Pina (L)	Other	Undecided
Dixie Strategies	September 6–7, 2018	519	± 4.3%	46%	30%	3%	–	22%

===== Results =====
2018 Texas Commissioner of the General Land Office election
Party	Candidate	Votes	%	±%
Republican	George P. Bush (incumbent)	4,435,202	53.68%	−7.00%
Democratic	Miguel Suazo	3,567,927	43.19%	+7.87%
Libertarian	Matt Piña	258,482	3.13%	+0.42%
Total votes		8,261,611	100.0%	
Republican hold				

=== Commissioner of Agriculture ===
2018 Texas Agriculture Commissioner election
- November 6, 2018
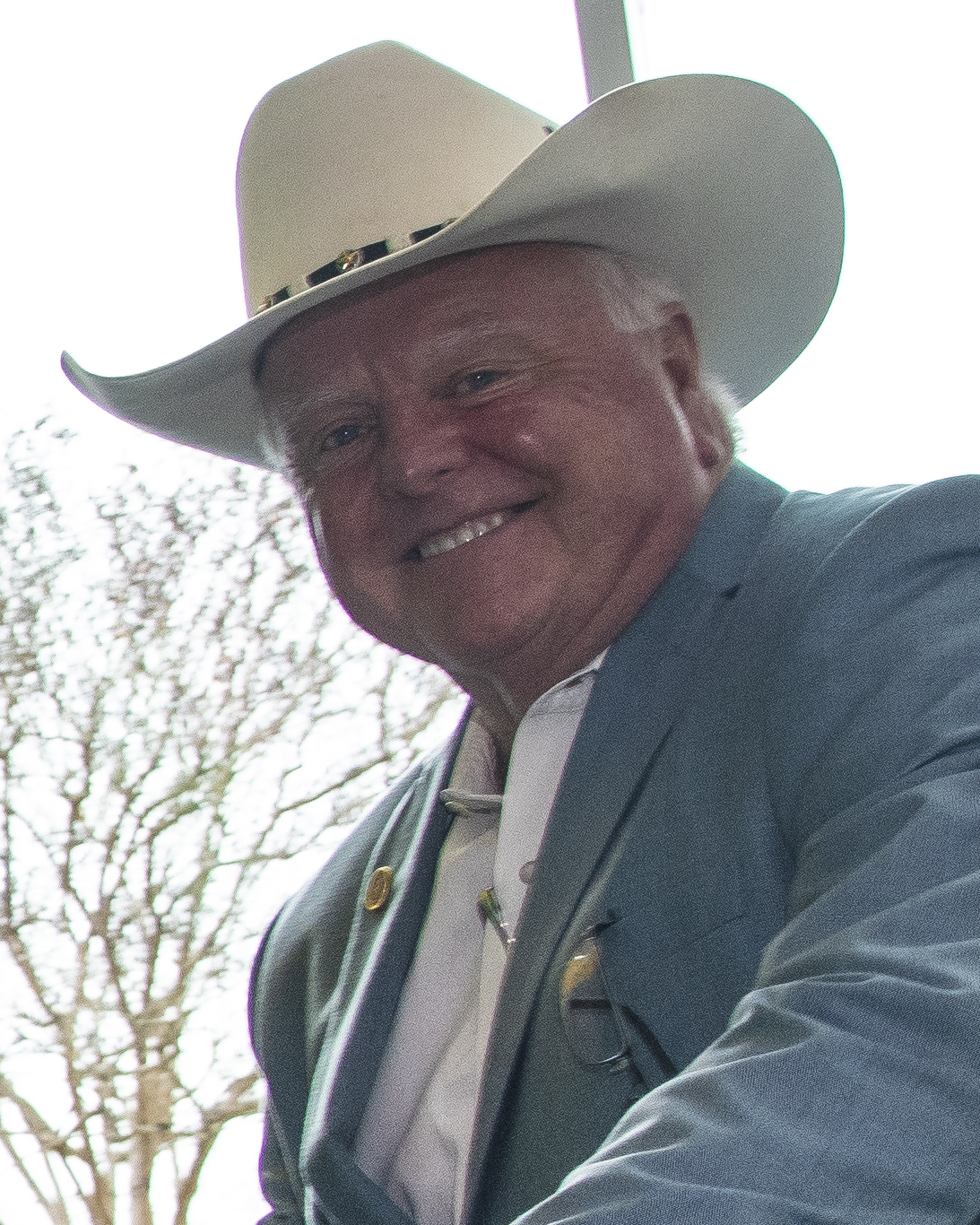

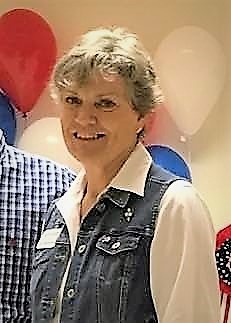
Nominee	Sid Miller	Kim Olson
Party	Republican	Democratic
Popular vote	4,221,527	3,822,137
Percentage	51.3%	46.4%
- County results Miller: 40–50% 50–60% 60–70% 70–80% 80–90% >90% Olson: 40–50% 50–60% 60–70% 70–80%
Agriculture Commissioner before election
Sid Miller
Republican
Elected Agriculture Commissioner
Sid Miller
Republican

Incumbent Republican Commissioner Sid Miller ran for re-election to a second term.

==== Republican primary ====
===== Candidates =====
- Trey Blocker, lobbyist
- Jim Hogan, Democratic nominee for Agriculture Commissioner in 2014
- Sid Miller, incumbent Commissioner of Agriculture

===== Results =====
Republican primary results
Party	Candidate	Votes	%
Republican	Sid Miller (incumbent)	755,498	55.65%
Republican	Jim Hogan	310,431	22.87%
Republican	Trey Blocker	291,583	21.48%
Total votes		1,357,512	100.0%

==== Democratic primary ====
===== Candidates =====
- Kim Olson, retired U.S. Air Force colonel, former member of the Weatherford Independent School District Board of Trustees

===== Results =====
Democratic primary results
Party	Candidate	Votes	%
Democratic	Kim Olson	883,575	100.0%
Total votes		883,575	100.0%

==== Libertarian state convention ====
===== Candidates =====
- Richard Carpenter

==== General election ====
===== Results =====
2018 Texas Commissioner of Agriculture election
Party	Candidate	Votes	%	±%
Republican	Sid Miller (incumbent)	4,221,527	51.26%	−7.34%
Democratic	Kim Olson	3,822,137	46.41%	+9.57%
Libertarian	Richard Carpenter	191,639	2.33%	−0.55%
Total votes		8,235,303	100.0%	
Republican hold				

=== Railroad Commissioner ===
2018 Texas Railroad Commissioner election
- November 6, 2018
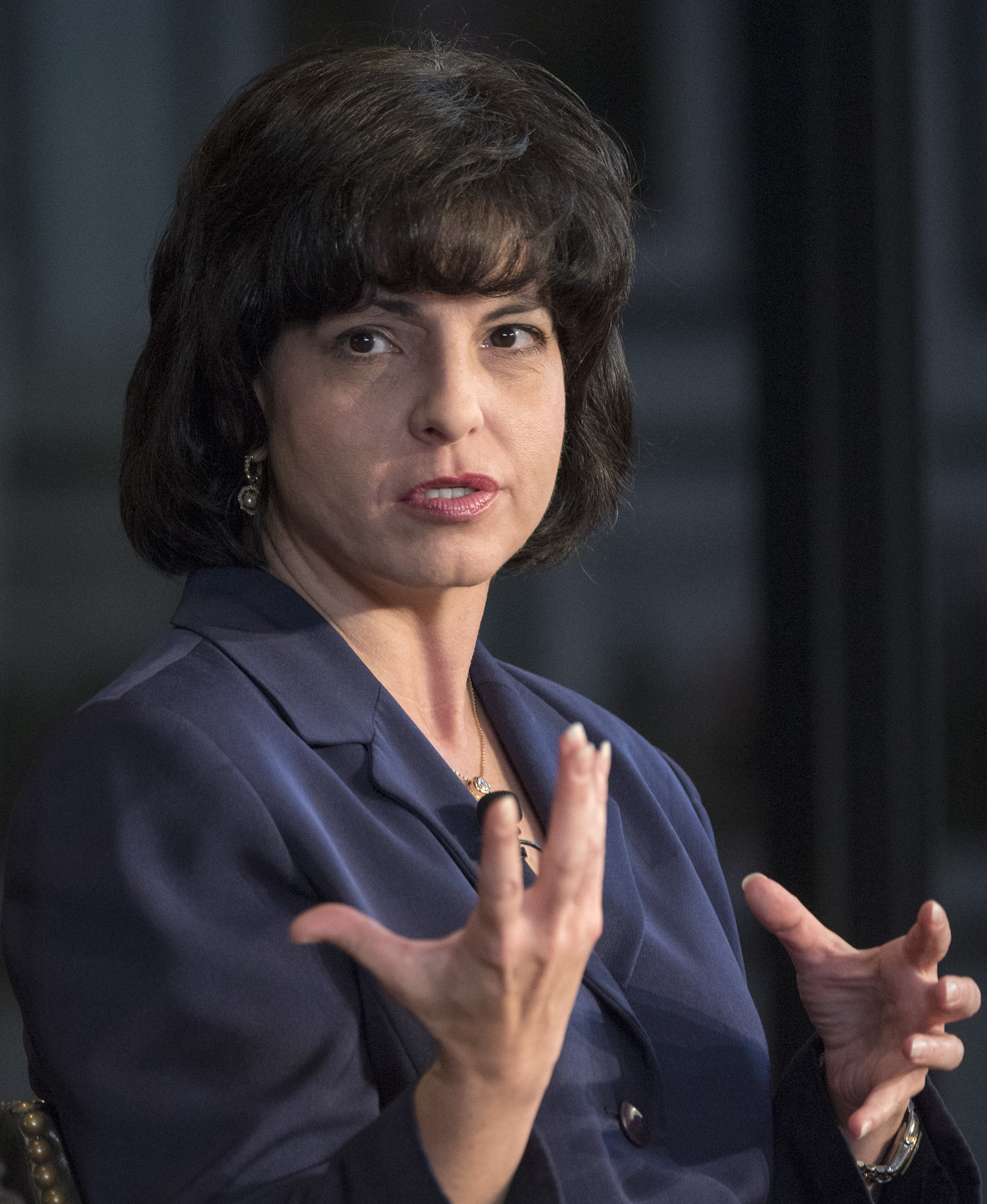

Nominee	Christi Craddick	Roman McAllen
Party	Republican	Democratic
Popular vote	4,376,729	3,612,130
Percentage	53.2%	43.9%
- County results Craddick: 40–50% 50–60% 60–70% 70–80% 80–90% >90% McAllen: 40–50% 50–60% 60–70% 70–80%
Railroad Commissioner before election
Christi Craddick
Republican
Elected Railroad Commissioner
Christi Craddick
Republican

Incumbent Republican Commissioner Christi Craddick ran for re-election to a second six-year term.

==== Republican primary ====
===== Candidates =====
- Christi Craddick, incumbent railroad commissioner
- Weston Martinez, former Texas Real Estate Commissioner

===== Results =====
Republican primary results
Party	Candidate	Votes	%
Republican	Christi Craddick (incumbent)	1,042,663	75.83%
Republican	Weston Martinez	332,374	24.17%
Total votes		1,375,007	100.0%

==== Democratic primary ====
===== Candidates =====
- Roman McAllen, historic preservation officer
- Chris Spellmon, businessman

===== Results =====
Democratic primary results
Party	Candidate	Votes	%
Democratic	Roman McAllen	539,785	58.51%
Democratic	Chris Spellmon	382,795	41.49%
Total votes		922,580	100.0%

==== Libertarian state convention ====
===== Candidates =====
- Mike Wright

==== General election ====
===== Results =====
2018 Texas Railroad Commissioner election
Party	Candidate	Votes	%	±%
Republican	Christi Craddick (incumbent)	4,376,729	53.20%	−5.14%
Democratic	Roman McAllen	3,612,130	43.91%	+7.43%
Libertarian	Mike Wright	237,984	2.89%	−0.26%
Total votes		8,226,843	100.0%	
Republican hold				

== Judicial ==
=== Supreme Court ===
==== Place 2 ====
2018 Texas Supreme Court Place 2 election
- November 6, 2018

Nominee	Jimmy Blacklock	Steven Kirkland
Party	Republican	Democratic
Popular vote	4,358,756	3,838,411
Percentage	53.2%	46.8%
- Congressional district results Blacklock: 50–60% 60–70% 70–80% 80–90% Kirkland: 50–60% 60–70% 70–80% 80–90%
Justice before election
Jimmy Blacklock
Republican
Elected Justice
Jimmy Blacklock
Republican

Incumbent Justice Jimmy Blacklock ran for a full term after being appointed by Governor Greg Abbott on January 2, 2018. Justice Blacklock filled the vacant seat left by Don Willett due to his appointment by President Donald Trump to the U.S. 5th Circuit Court of Appeals.

===== Republican primary =====
====== Candidates ======
- Jimmy Blacklock, incumbent associate justice

====== Results ======
Republican primary results
Party	Candidate	Votes	%
Republican	Jimmy Blacklock (incumbent)	1,215,844	100.0%
Total votes		1,215,844	100.0%

===== Democratic primary =====
====== Candidates ======
- Steven Kirkland, judge of the Harris County District Court (334th District)

====== Results ======
Democratic primary results
Party	Candidate	Votes	%
Democratic	Steven Kirkland	875,297	100.0%
Total votes		875,297	100.0%

===== General election =====
====== Results ======
2018 Texas Supreme Court Place 2 election
Party	Candidate	Votes	%	±%
Republican	Jimmy Blacklock (incumbent)	4,358,756	53.17%	N/A
Democratic	Steven Kirkland	3,838,411	46.83%	N/A
Total votes		8,197,167	100.0%	
Republican hold				

==== Place 4 ====
2018 Texas Supreme Court Place 4 election
- November 6, 2018

Nominee	John Devine	R.K. Sandill
Party	Republican	Democratic
Popular vote	4,399,890	3,792,144
Percentage	53.7%	46.3%
- Congressional district results Devine: 50–60% 60–70% 70–80% 80–90% Sandill: 50–60% 60–70% 70–80% 80–90%
Justice before election
John Devine
Republican
Elected Justice
John Devine
Republican

Incumbent Justice John Devine ran for re-election to a second six-year term.

===== Republican primary =====
====== Candidates ======
- John Devine, incumbent associate justice

====== Results ======
Republican primary results
Party	Candidate	Votes	%
Republican	John Devine (incumbent)	1,211,769	100.0%
Total votes		1,211,769	100.0%

===== Democratic primary =====
====== Candidates ======
- R.K. Sandill, judge of the Harris County District Court (127th District)

====== Results ======
Democratic primary results
Party	Candidate	Votes	%
Democratic	R.K. Sandill	863,593	100.0%
Total votes		863,593	100.0%

===== General election =====
====== Results ======
2018 Texas Supreme Court Place 4 election
Party	Candidate	Votes	%	±%
Republican	John Devine (incumbent)	4,399,890	53.71%	−21.35%
Democratic	R.K. Sandill	3,792,144	46.29%	N/A
Total votes		8,192,034	100.0%	
Republican hold				

==== Place 6 ====
2018 Texas Supreme Court Place 6 election
- November 6, 2018
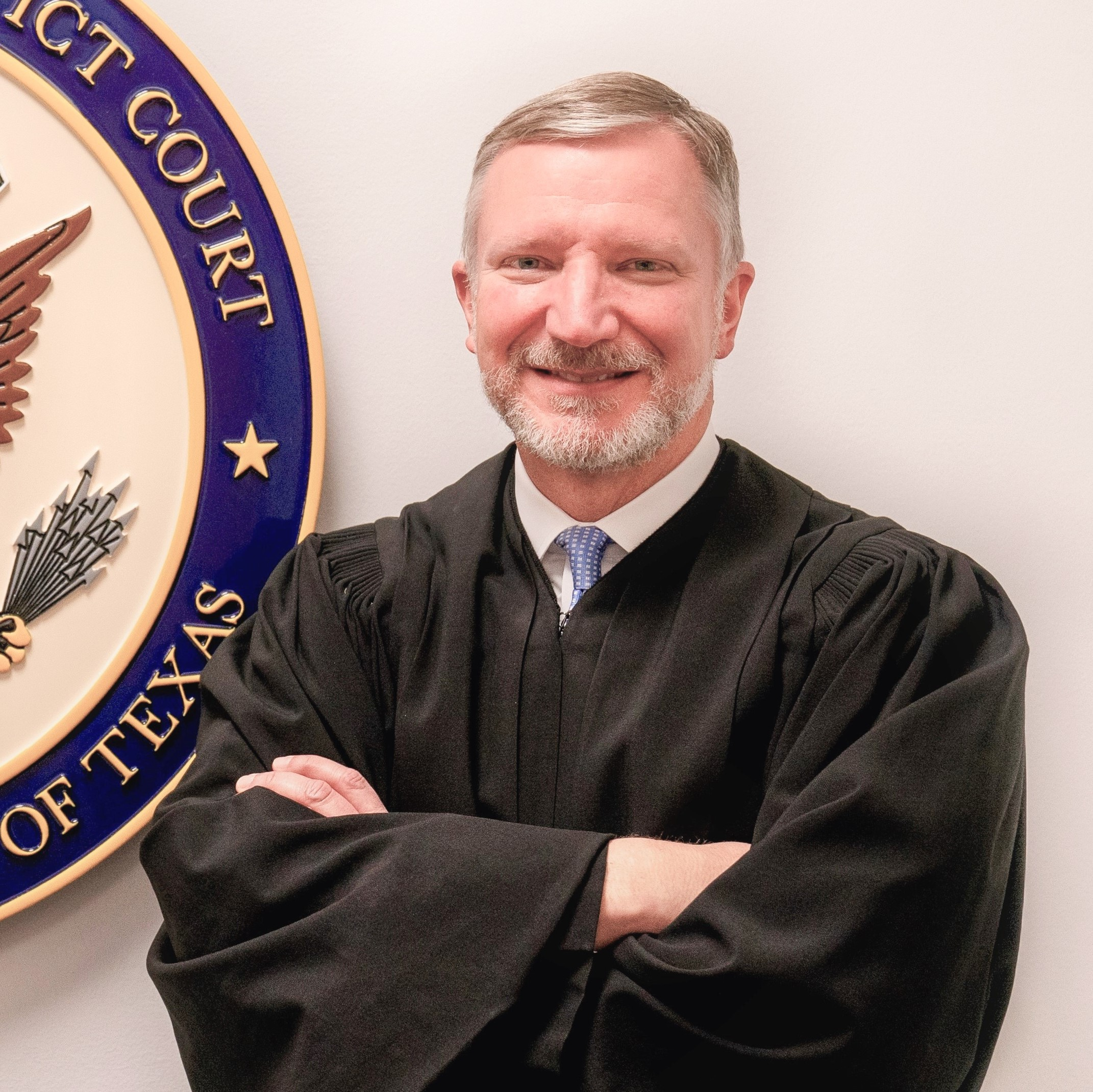

Nominee	Jeff Brown	Kathy Cheng
Party	Republican	Democratic
Popular vote	4,404,602	3,796,001
Percentage	53.7%	46.3%
- Congressional district results Brown: 50–60% 60–70% 70–80% 80–90% Cheng: 50–60% 60–70% 70–80% 80–90%
Justice before election
Jeff Brown
Republican
Elected Justice
Jeff Brown
Republican

Incumbent Justice Jeff Brown ran for a full eight-year term after being elected to finish Chief Justice Nathan Hecht's term in 2014.

===== Republican primary =====
====== Candidates ======
- Jeff Brown, incumbent associate justice

====== Results ======
Republican primary results
Party	Candidate	Votes	%
Republican	Jeff Brown (incumbent)	1,197,450	100.0%
Total votes		1,197,450	100.0%

===== Democratic primary =====
====== Candidates ======
- Kathy Cheng, business litigator

====== Results ======
Democratic primary results
Party	Candidate	Votes	%
Democratic	Kathy Cheng	874,029	100.0%
Total votes		874,029	100.0%

===== General election =====
====== Results ======
2018 Texas Supreme Court Place 6 election
Party	Candidate	Votes	%	±%
Republican	Jeff Brown (incumbent)	4,404,602	53.71%	−0.01%
Democratic	Kathy Cheng	3,796,001	46.29%	+4.38%
Total votes		8,200,603	100.0%	
Republican hold				

=== Court of Criminal Appeals ===
==== Presiding Judge ====
2018 Texas Court of Criminal Appeals Presiding Judge election
- November 6, 2018

Nominee	Sharon Keller	Maria Jackson
Party	Republican	Democratic
Popular vote	4,288,913	3,734,179
Percentage	52.2%	45.5%
Presiding Judge before election
Sharon Keller
Republican
Elected Presiding Judge
Sharon Keller
Republican

Incumbent presiding judge Sharon Keller ran for re-election to a 5th six-year term.

===== Republican primary =====
====== Candidates ======
- David Bridges, incumbent associate justice of the Fifth Court of Appeals of Texas
- Sharon Keller, incumbent presiding judge

====== Results ======
Republican primary results
Party	Candidate	Votes	%
Republican	Sharon Keller (incumbent)	674,889	52.16%
Republican	David Bridges	618,982	47.84%
Total votes		1,293,871	100.0%

===== Democratic primary =====
====== Candidates ======
- Maria T. Jackson, judge of the Harris County District Court (339th District)

====== Results ======
Democratic primary results
Party	Candidate	Votes	%
Democratic	Maria T. (Terri) Jackson	878,581	100.0%
Total votes		878,581	100.0%

===== General election =====
====== Results ======
2018 Texas Criminal Court of Appeals Presiding Judge election
Party	Candidate	Votes	%	±%
Republican	Sharon Keller (incumbent)	4,288,913	52.24%	−3.25%
Democratic	Maria T. (Terri) Jackson	3,734,179	45.48%	+4.24%
Libertarian	William Bryan Strange III	187,384	2.28%	−0.98%
Total votes		8,210,476	100.0%	
Republican hold				

==== Place 7 ====
2018 Texas Court of Criminal Appeals Place 7 election
- November 6, 2018

Nominee	Barbara Hervey	Ramona Franklin
Party	Republican	Democratic
Popular vote	4,429,113	3,750,114
Percentage	54.1%	45.9%
Judge before election
Barbara Hervey
Republican
Elected Judge
Barbara Hervey
Republican

Incumbent Judge Barbara Hervey ran for re-election to a 4th six-year term.

===== Republican primary =====
====== Candidates ======
- Barbara Parker Hervey, incumbent judge

====== Results ======
Republican primary results
Party	Candidate	Votes	%
Republican	Barbara Parker Hervey (incumbent)	1,171,978	100.0%
Total votes		1,171,978	100.0%

===== Democratic primary =====
====== Candidates ======
- Ramona Franklin, judge of the Harris County District Court (338th District)

====== Results ======
Democratic primary results
Party	Candidate	Votes	%
Democratic	Ramona Franklin	872,150	100.0%
Total votes		872,150	100.0%

===== General election =====
====== Results ======
2018 Texas Criminal Court of Appeals Place 7 election
Party	Candidate	Votes	%	±%
Republican	Barbara Parker Hervey (incumbent)	4,429,113	54.15%	−23.73%
Democratic	Ramona Franklin	3,750,114	45.85%	N/A
Total votes		8,179,227	100.0%	
Republican hold				

==== Place 8 ====
2018 Texas Court of Criminal Appeals Place 8 election
- November 6, 2018

Nominee	Michelle Slaughter	Mark Ash
Party	Republican	Libertarian
Popular vote	4,760,576	1,614,119
Percentage	74.7%	25.3%
Judge before election
Elsa Alcala
Republican
Elected Judge
Michelle Slaughter
Republican

Incumbent Judge Elsa Alcala did not seek re-election to a second term.

===== Republican primary =====
====== Candidates ======
- Jay Brandon, Bexar County assistant district attorney
- Michelle Slaughter, judge of the Galveston County District Court (405th District)
- Dib Waldrip, judge of the Comal County District Court (433rd District)

====== Results ======
Republican primary results
Party	Candidate	Votes	%
Republican	Michelle Slaughter	669,949	52.84%
Republican	Jay Brandon	389,753	30.74%
Republican	Dib Waldrip	208,179	16.42%
Total votes		1,267,881	100.0%

===== General election =====
====== Results ======
2018 Texas Criminal Court of Appeals Place 8 election
Party	Candidate	Votes	%	±%
Republican	Michelle Slaughter	4,760,576	74.68%	−3.38%
Libertarian	Mark Ash	1,614,119	25.32%	+3.38%
Total votes		6,374,695	100.0%	
Republican hold				

== State Board of Education ==
=== Member, District 2 ===
==== Republican primary ====
Republican primary results
Party	Candidate	Votes	%	±%
Republican	Charles "Tad" Hasse	31,717	67.12%	
Republican	Eric Garza	15,536	32.87%	
Total votes		47,253	100%	+47,253

==== Democratic primary ====
Democratic primary results
Party	Candidate	Votes	%	±%
Democratic	Ruben Cortez, Jr. (incumbent)	31,289	52.34%	−47.66%
Democratic	Michelle Arevalo Davila	28,487	47.65%	
Total votes		59,776	100%	+15,817

==== General election ====
General election results
Party	Candidate	Votes	%
Democratic	Ruben Cortez, Jr. (incumbent)	206,689	53.60%
Republican	Charles "Tad" Hasse	178,923	46.40%
Total votes		385,612	100%

=== Member, District 3 ===
==== Democratic primary ====
Democratic primary results
Party	Candidate	Votes	%	±%
Democratic	Marisa B. Perez-Diaz (incumbent)	60,027	75.93%	−24.07%
Democratic	Dan Arellano	19,022	24.06%	
Total votes		79,049	100%	+33,721

==== General election ====
General election results
Party	Candidate	Votes	%
Democratic	Marisa B. Perez-Diaz (incumbent)	302,242	100%
Total votes		302,242	100%

=== Member, District 4 ===
==== Democratic primary ====
Democratic primary results
Party	Candidate	Votes	%	±%
Democratic	Lawrence Allen Jr. (incumbent)	45,162	66.9%	−33.1%
Democratic	Steven A. Chambers	22,337	33.09%	
Total votes		67,499	100%	+41,084

==== General election ====
General election results
Party	Candidate	Votes	%
Democratic	Lawrence Allen Jr. (incumbent)	311,590	100%
Total votes		311,590	100%

=== Member, District 7 ===
==== Republican primary ====
Republican primary results
Party	Candidate	Votes	%	±%
Republican	Matt Robinson		100%	
Total votes			100%	

==== Democratic primary ====
Democratic primary results
Party	Candidate	Votes	%	±%
Democratic	Elizabeth Markowitz		100%	
Total votes			100%	

==== General election ====
General election results
Party	Candidate	Votes	%
Republican	Matt Robinson	369,752	59.45%
Democratic	Elizabeth Markowitz	252,158	40.55%
Total votes		621,910	100%

=== Member, District 11 ===
==== Republican primary ====
Republican primary results
Party	Candidate	Votes	%	±%
Republican	Patricia "Pat" Hardy (incumbent)	58,796	55.75%	+6.18%
Republican	Feyi Obamehinti	25,580	24.25%	
Republican	Cheryl Surber	21,073	19.98%	
Total votes		105,449	100%	+18,482

==== Democratic primary ====
Democratic primary results
Party	Candidate	Votes	%	±%
Democratic	Carla Morton	33,217	57.89%	
Democratic	Celeste Light	24,156	42.1%	
Total votes		57,373	100%	+34,520

==== General election ====
General election results
Party	Candidate	Votes	%
Republican	Patricia "Pat" Hardy (incumbent)	366,245	57.16%
Democratic	Carla Morton	259,276	40.46%
Libertarian	Aaron Gutknecht	15,241	2.38%
Total votes		640,762	100%

=== Member, District 12 ===
==== Republican primary ====
Republican primary results
Party	Candidate	Votes	%
Republican	Pam Little	82,548	100%
Total votes		82,548	100%

==== Democratic primary ====
===== First round =====
Democratic primary results
Party	Candidate	Votes	%	±%
Democratic	Suzanne Smith	35,460	48.06%	
Democratic	Laura Malone-Miller	19,426	26.33%	
Democratic	Tina Green	18,883	25.59%	
Total votes		73,769	100%	+6,404

Malone-Miller withdrew after the first round, eliminating the need for a runoff.

==== General election ====
General election results
Party	Candidate	Votes	%
Republican	Pam Little	334,584	49.43%
Democratic	Suzanne Smith	324,307	47.91%
Libertarian	Rachel Wester	18,002	2.66%
Total votes		676,893	100%

=== Member, District 13 ===
==== Republican primary ====
Republican primary results
Party	Candidate	Votes	%	±%
Republican	A. Denise Russell		100%	
Total votes			100%	

==== Democratic primary ====
Democratic primary results
Party	Candidate	Votes	%	±%
Democratic	Aicha Davis		100%	
Total votes			100%	

==== General election ====
General election results
Party	Candidate	Votes	%
Democratic	Aicha Davis	309,926	76.32%
Republican	A. Denise Russell	96,136	23.68%
Total votes		406,062	100%

== Texas Legislature ==
Every seat in the Texas House of Representatives and about half of the seats in the Texas Senate were up for election.

=== Texas Senate ===
Senate districts and results Republican hold Democratic gold Republican gain Democratic gain

=== Texas House of Representatives ===
House districts and results Republican hold Democratic hold Democratic gain
