= TREC =

TREC may refer to:

- Techniques de Randonnée Équestre de Compétition or Trec, an equestrian discipline
- Text Retrieval Conference, workshops co-sponsored by the National Institute of Standards and Technology (NIST) and the U.S. Department of Defense
- Texas Real Estate Commission, the state agency that governs real estate practices in Texas
- Trans-Mediterranean Renewable Energy Cooperation
- Toronto Renewable Energy Co-operative, creators of the WindShare wind power co-operative in Toronto, Ontario
- T-cell receptor excision circles
- Trading Right Entitlement Certificate as defined in the Demutualization Act in Bangladesh
