= Tom Butler (Texas politician) =

American politician

Member-elect of the Texas House of Representatives from the 128th district
- Assuming office January 2027
- Succeeding: Briscoe Cain

Personal details
- Party: Republican

Tom Butler is an American politician. A member of the Republican Party, he is the member-elect for the 128th district of the Texas House of Representatives.
