= Wayne Smith (Texas politician) =

American politician

Richard Wayne Smith

Member of the Texas House of Representatives from the 128th district
- In office January 14, 2003 – January 9, 2017
- Preceded by: Frederick Martin "Fred" Bosse
- Succeeded by: Briscoe Cain

Personal details
- Born: August 17, 1943 (age 83) Bell County, Texas, U.S.
- Party: Republican
- Spouse: Brenda Smith
- Children: 2
- Education: University of Texas at Arlington
- Occupation: Retired civil engineer and land surveyor

Military service
- Branch/service: United States Army
- Battles/wars: Vietnam War

Richard Wayne Smith, commonly known as Wayne Smith, (born August 17, 1943) is a former seven-term Republican member of the Texas House of Representatives for District 128. He was first elected in November 2002 and served until January 2017. On May 24, 2016, Smith was unseated by 23 votes in the Republican runoff election by Briscoe Cain, 3,050 (50.2%) to 3,027 (49.8%).

== Political life ==
=== Elections ===
In the 2016 Republican Primary, held on March 1, Smith had two challengers—Briscoe Cain and Melody McDaniel. Smith received 43.75% of the vote and Cain received 47.83%, resulting in a runoff. In the runoff election, held on May 24, Smith lost to Briscoe Cain by 23 votes − 3,050 (50.2%) to 3,027 (49.8%). Smith sought a recount. The vote count was unchanged after the recount.

=== House Committee assignments ===
In 2015, Texas Speaker of the House Joe Straus appointed Smith as chairman of the House Licensing and Administrative Procedures Committee. Smith also sat on the Culture, Recreation, and Tourism Committee. Smith was first appointed as chairman of the Licensing and Administrative Procedures Committee in 2013 by Straus. in 2011 Straus appointed Smith as chairman of the Environmental Regulations Committee. Smith was also appointed chair of the County Affairs Committee in 2007 and 2003.

=== Legislative record ===
==== 2015 ====
In 2015, Smith voted to allow felons to receive foodstamps (SNAP Benefits). He voted to make it a crime to film legislators inside the state capital without their permission. He voted to make it a crime for citizens or journalists to film legislators inside the state capital without their permission. In 2015, Smith voted against requiring conference committees to be open and transparent to constituents. Smith voted to table an amendment to Texas House Bill 32 which sought to increase the franchise tax exemptions for small businesses. Smith also voted to increase the office budget of representatives. He voted to create a clean needle exchange.

==== 2013 ====
In 2013, Smith voted for Medicaid expansion, a vote that according to Americans for Prosperity and Empower Texans, would have implemented Obamacare in Texas; the amendment however failed to pass. Smith voted against establishing term limits for certain statewide elected offices. In May 2013, when Texas Senate Bill 5 was brought up, Smith voted for the ban on abortion after twenty weeks of gestation; the measure passed the House, 96–49. He also voted for companion legislation to increase medical and licensing requirements of abortion providers. In 2011, Smith supported two other anti-abortion measures. One forbids state funding of agencies which perform abortions and the other requires that a woman undergo a sonogram before procuring an abortion.

In 2013, Smith voted against requiring legislators to disclose government contracts entered into by themselves, their family or their businesses. He voted to prohibit texting while driving. Smith supported an "equal pay for women" bill, which passed the Legislature but was vetoed by Governor Perry. Smith voted against redirecting $1.4 million toward volunteer fire departments from bingo compliance.

==== 2011 ====
In 2011, Smith supported a resolution to reduce funding for state agencies. In 2011, he voted to expand the sales tax to Internet transactions to match existing laws for brick and mortar stores; the measure passed the House 125–20. The same year, Smith opposed budget transparency by voting against requiring every expenditure to be line-itemed for each entity's appropriation. In 2011, Smith, voted against shifting funds from the Commission on the Arts to the Texas Department of Aging and Disability Services. In 2011, Smith voted against a bill to prohibit smoking in public places. Smith voted against permitting the use of corporal punishment as a method of student discipline; the bill nevertheless passed the House, 80–64. Smith voted to require colleges and universities to make student centers compatible with traditional family values. To guarantee the integrity of the election process, Smith supported picture identification of voters. The law finally took effect in October 2013 and was used widely without incident in the primaries on March 4, 2014. In 2013, Smith supported related legislation to forbid a voter from turning in multiple ballots.

In 2011, Smith voted for HB 150 which approved the redistricting of several house districts that according to policy organizations sought to punish conservative republicans who voted against Joe Straus for Speaker.

==== 2009 ====
In 2009, Smith supported a bill to allow counties to increase property taxes. In 2009, Smith supported a bill to allow cities to increase property taxes to use on energy efficient improvements and also allowed cities to place a lien on the homeowner's lot until the improvement was made. Though the bill failed to pass, Smith supported a bill that sought to base property taxes on the owner's annual income rather than on the value of the property. In 2009, Smith voted for placing non-discrimination requirements for services and employment on faith based charities receiving government support. In 2009, Smith voted to give authority to the Commissioner of the Texas Education Agency to approve content of electronic textbooks.

==== 2007 ====
In 2007, Smith voted against giving school teachers a pay increase. He voted against the funding of school choice programs. The same year Smith voted for the levying of a "granny tax" on nursing home residents. A bill which according to State Senator Jane Nelson was "a tax on the people that could least afford it." In 2007, Smith opposed English-only education, and supported HB 2814 to allow schools to teach in students in two languages rather than just English. In response to HB 2814, Rep. Debbie Riddle (R-Dist. 150) said, "we're in America where English is the native language; kids should know how to use it proficiently." In 2007, he voted to increase the number of people eligible for indigent health care even though many of the families who would now be eligible could afford their own healthcare.

==== 2005 ====
In 2005, Smith voted to raise the motor vehicle sales tax. Smith voted to authorize counties to impose a local gasoline tax.

Political offices
Texas House of Representatives
Preceded by Frederick Martin "Fred" Bosse	Texas State Representative for District 128 (Harris County) Wayne Smith; 2003–2017	Succeeded by Briscoe Cain
