= Lynchburg, Texas =

- Unincorporated community
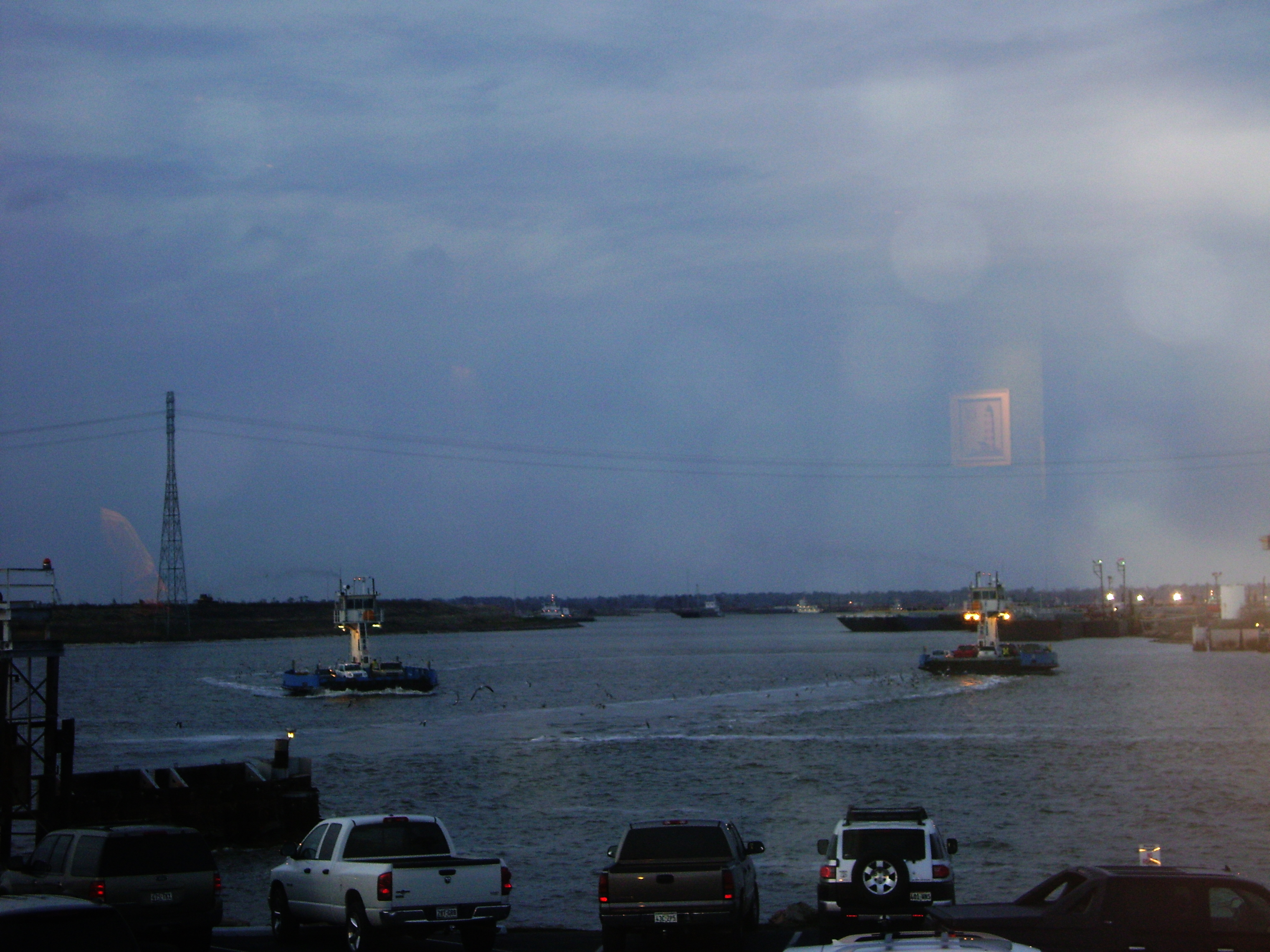
- Lynch's Ferry and Houston Ship Channel
- Nickname: Lynch's Ferry
- Location within State of Texas Lynchburg, Texas (the United States)
- Coordinates: 29.7871704°N 95.0554851°W
- Country: United States
- State: Texas
- Texas County: Harris County
- Lynchburg Town Ferry: 1822
- Elevation: 30 ft (9.1 m)
- Time zone: UTC−6 (Central (CST))
  - Summer (DST): UTC−5 (CDT)
- ZIP Code: 77520
- Area code: 713
- FIPS code: 48-48201
- GNIS feature ID: 1340754

Lynchburg (also known as Lynch's Ferry) is an unincorporated community in east central Harris County, Texas, United States.

== History ==
In 1822, Nathaniel Lynch built a ferry to cross the San Jacinto River at the confluence of Buffalo Bayou, claiming a landmark better known as Juan Seguin Historic Park. The ferry connected what would become the community of Lynchburg, on the east side of the crossing with the road to Harrisburg. At the western landing is the location of the San Jacinto Battlefield, where Texan forces under Sam Houston defeated Antonio López de Santa Anna's Mexican forces in 1836.

== Education ==
Deer Park Independent School District operates schools in the area. Zoned schools include:

- Deer Park Elementary School
- Deer Park Junior High School
- Deer Park High School
