= Briscoe Cain =

American politician

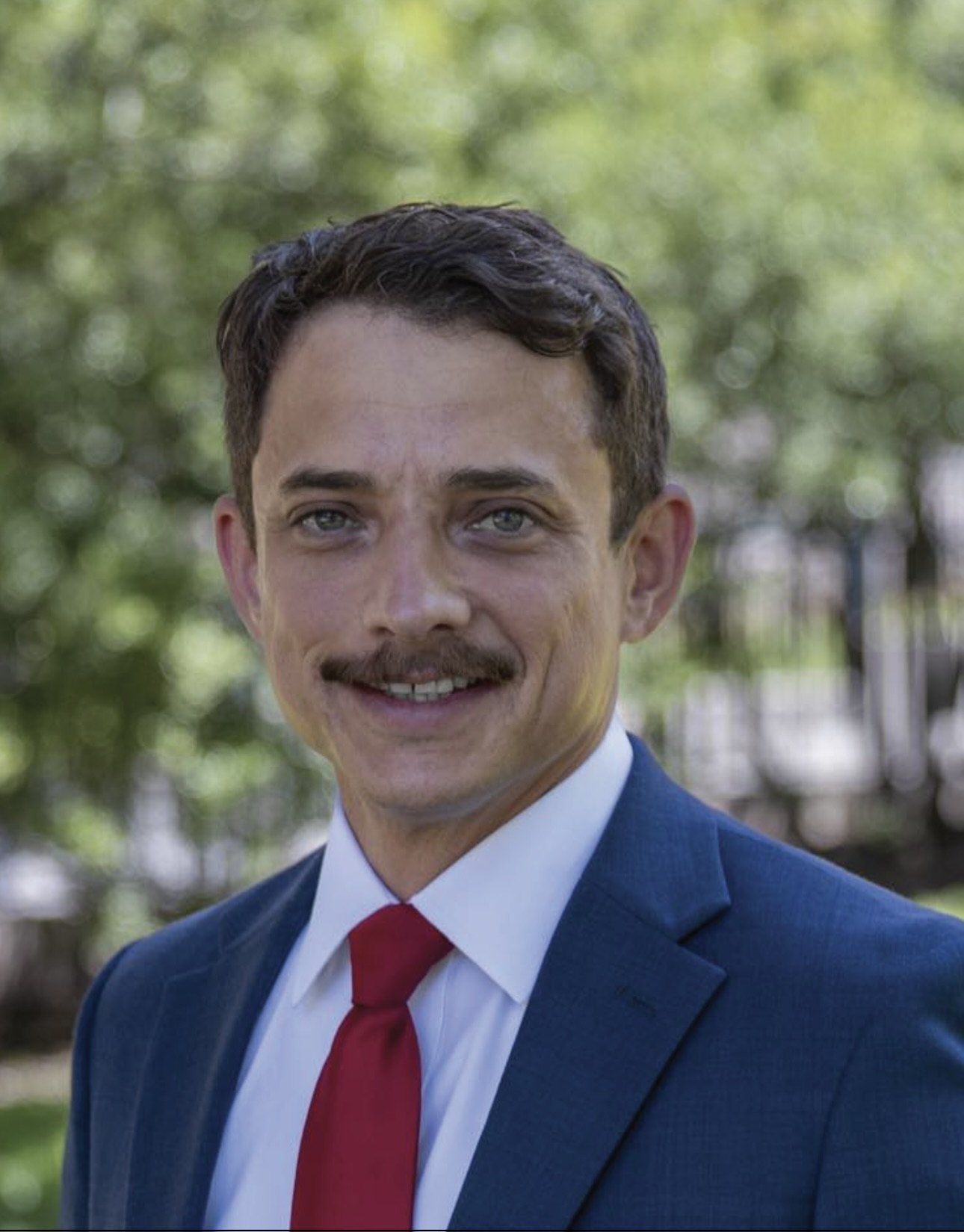
- Cain in 2025

Member of the Texas House of Representatives from the 128th district
- Incumbent
- Assumed office January 10, 2017
- Preceded by: Wayne Smith
- Succeeded by: Tom Butler (elect)

Personal details
- Born: Briscoe Rowell Cain III; December 9, 1984 (age 41) Webster, Texas, U.S.
- Party: Republican
- Children: 5
- Education: San Jacinto College (attended); University of Houston, Downtown (BA); South Texas College of Law (JD)
- Website: Campaign website

Military service
- Allegiance: Texas
- Branch/service: Texas State Guard
- Rank: Captain

Briscoe Rowell Cain III (born December 9, 1984) is an American attorney and Republican member of the Texas House of Representatives for District 128 since 2017. Cain was a candidate for Texas's 9th congressional district in the May, 2026 Republican primary runoff. He was defeated by investment banker Alex Mealer.

== Early life and education ==
Briscoe grew up in Deer Park, Texas, a suburb of Houston located in Harris County. At Deer Park High School, he was on the varsity cheerleading squad. He earned a bachelor's degree from the University of Houston-Downtown and a J.D. from South Texas College of Law.

== Political career ==
In December 2015, Cain successfully defended the religious rights of Beaumont police officers when the city banned them from having Bible study during lunch breaks. In 2016, Cain obtained via a FOIA request invoices sent by a California bioscience company to four Texas medical schools. From these invoices he claimed the Texas schools were using tax dollars to purchase aborted fetal tissue, since Planned Parenthood was known to give fetuses to the California company. In a statement, Texas Tech University Health Sciences Center El Paso said that it strictly followed federal and state guidelines. Cain is the Texas legal counsel to Operation Rescue.

Cain was elected by the Republican Party of Texas as an at-large member of the United States Electoral College in 2020. On December 14, 2020, he participated in the Texas presidential electors' meeting in Austin, Texas, casting his vote for Donald Trump for president.

=== Texas House of Representatives ===
In the 2016 Republican runoff election, Cain defeated seven-term incumbent Wayne Smith by 23 votes. In the 2016 general election, Cain defeated Libertarian candidate Ken Lowder. Cain ran unopposed in the Republican primary election held on March 6, 2018. On July 5, 2017, Terry Sain of Baytown, Texas announced that he would be running against Cain in the 2018 Republican primary. However, just before the December 11, 2017, deadline to file for a place on the primary ballot, Sain announced that he was no longer going to challenge Cain. Citing the difficulties of running a campaign as a reason he dropped out of the race, Sain told The Baytown Sun that running in the campaign "wasn't quite as easy of a road as I thought it was going to be."

In the November 6, 2018, general election Cain ran unopposed.

On November 18, 2019, Robert Hoskins of Baytown, Texas announced he would be running against Cain in the 2020 Republican primary. Hoskins, considered a moderate Republican, is a member of the Baytown City Council and a former member of the Goose Creek Consolidated Independent School District board of trustees. The race between Cain and Hoskins was considered to be one of the more high-profile primary contests during the 2020 Texas Republican primary. On March 3, 2020, Cain defeated Hoskins in the Republican primary election, when Cain received 11,752 votes (79.32 percent) to Hoskins' 3,064 votes (20.68 percent). Cain defeated Democrat Mary Williams in the 2020 general election for District 128 representative.

Cain ran unopposed in the Republican primary election held on March 1, 2022. In the November 8, 2022, general election Cain defeated Democrat Chuck Crews with 70.5 percent of the vote.

==== Voting record and interest group ratings ====
Since being elected in 2016, Cain has consistently ranked as one of the most conservative members of the Texas House.

The biennial analysis of Texas legislators' voting records by Rice University's James A. Baker III Institute for Public Policy found Cain to be the most conservative member of the Texas House for the 2017 regular session, 2017 special session, 2019 regular session, and the 2021 regular and special sessions. The same study found Cain to be the second most conservative member for the 2021 regular session, 2023 regular session, 2023 regular and special sessions, and the 2025 regular session.

Cain was named one of "The Worst Legislators of 2017" by Texas Monthly, describing him as "uninformed and ignorant" and stating "When we asked Capitol insiders for Worst list suggestions, [Briscoe Cain], almost universally, was the first one mentioned".

Cain was named Recipient of Operation Rescue's 2021 Pro-Life Person of the Year Malachi Award for his work on the Texas Heartbeat Act.

==== Committee assignments ====
- 89th Legislative Session
  - Agriculture & Livestock
  - Delivery of Government Efficiency
- 88th Legislative Session
  - Chairman, Agriculture & Livestock
  - Insurance
- 87th Legislative Session
  - Chairman, Elections
  - Business & Industry
- 86th Legislative Session
  - Chairman, Select Committee on Driver's License Issuance & Renewal
  - Elections
  - International Relations & Economic Development
  - Resolutions Calendars
- 85th Legislative Session
  - Defense & Veterans' Affairs
  - Juvenile Justice & Family Issues

=== 2026 congressional election ===
Following the mid-decade redistricting in Texas, several congressional districts safely held by Democrats became competitive. Cain announced that instead of running for reelection to the Texas House, he would run for Texas' 9th Congressional district, which includes areas to the east of Houston. The longtime Democratic incumbent, Al Green, moved to run in the 18th congressional district due to the boundary shifts. Cain faced eight opponents in the crowded Republican primary and he came in second place against Houston Metro board member Alex Mealer, winning 31.2% of the vote to Mealer's with 35.8%. Since no candidate received over 50% of the vote, Cain and Mealer advanced to a runoff election which was held on May 26, 2026. Mealer won the runoff and became the nominee.

== Political positions ==
=== Abortion ===
Cain is ardently anti-abortion and authored an early version of Texas's six-week abortion ban, also known as the Texas Heartbeat Act.

Cain has also targeted abortion funds in Texas and threatened them with criminal prosecution for their violations of Texas's pre–Roe v. Wade abortion statutes. On March 18, 2022, Cain sent cease-and-desist letters to every abortion fund in Texas, demanding that they immediately stop paying for abortions performed in Texas or face criminal prosecution. Abortion funds in Texas have refused to halt their activities in response to Cain's letter, and Cain has promised to introduce legislation that will ensure that Texas abortion funds and their donors are prosecuted for each abortion that they have assisted or paid for in the state of Texas.

=== COVID-19 pandemic ===
During the COVID-19 pandemic, Cain defied Governor Greg Abbott's closure of businesses by getting a haircut. Cain also served as an attorney for Shelley Luther, the Dallas Salon owner who was jailed for opening her hair salon in violation of an order related to the COVID-19 pandemic.

=== Immigration ===
Cain is an outspoken supporter of the enforcement of immigration laws (particularly in relation to the U.S-Mexico border). His campaign website states that he believes "that increased border security is critical for increasing job opportunities for Americans and decreasing crime and taxes on Texas families".

=== Christianity ===
Briscoe, a non-denominational Christian, cited his faith as his biggest source of inspiration in life as part of a 2017 interview with UHD News. Cain has additionally gone on record to state, "Yes I mix religion and politics." He has pledged as part of his 2020 campaign platform to protect the "guarantee of religious liberty", as well as "ensure that traditional Christian values are restored and strengthened."

=== Voting rights ===
Briscoe Cain assisted President Trump's attempts to overturn the election results of 2020 United States presidential election following his re-election loss by using baseless claims of voter fraud. In February 2021, Republican Texas House Speaker Dade Phelan appointed Cain as the chair of the Texas House Elections Committee. The following bills that Cain co-sponsored were accused by Democrats and Voting and Civil Rights groups as restricting voting access. Cain defended the proposed restrictions as necessary to maintain the "purity of the ballot box". After some business in Texas opposed the legislation, Cain proposed financial penalties to any business protesting the new proposed voter restrictions.

After the legislation had been implemented, mail-in ballots were rejected at record numbers for not filling out forms correctly as specified by the new regulations.

== Activities ==
=== Texas Southern University protest ===
On October 10, 2017, protesters at Texas Southern University (TSU) prevented Cain from speaking at a Federalist Society event on campus. Cain was invited by the president of TSU's Federalist Society student chapter to speak to students at the traditionally black university. He planned to talk about the Texas Legislature's most recent special session. During that session Cain proposed an amendment to a budget bill which would prevent the state of Texas from paying for sex reassignment surgery and hormone therapy for inmates in prison, and he voted in favor of a proposed "bathroom bill". Protesters claimed that Cain "has ties to the Alt-Right and is anti-LGBT" and drowned out Cain's attempts to speak. They were removed; as Cain began to speak again the school's president ordered the protesters be brought back in and canceled the event, saying the Federalist Society chapter was an unregistered student group and the event was "unapproved". Cain said in a statement that the talk had been scheduled for months, and that he was "brought into a room in which the administration had specifically requested the talk occur. Then Black Lives Matter came in and bullied the administration into ending the event." James Douglas, the interim dean of TSU's Thurgood Marshall School of Law, said the event had been cleared with him and that he was investigating the incident. He said, "We have a process here in the law school, and they went through our process. The speaker had a First Amendment right to be heard by the students that invited him." A student who had helped organize the protest said that "[w]ith his First Amendment right to espouse hate comes our First Amendment right" to protest. Cain, a partner at a law firm where he practices First Amendment law, said he intended to sue the school and its president for infringing upon his First Amendment rights.

=== Texas Democratic Convention prank ===
On June 22, 2018, Cain and three other men snuck into the Texas Democratic Party's state convention being held at the Fort Worth Convention Center in Fort Worth, Texas, where Cain and three other men handed out 100 yard signs which read, "This home is a gun-free safe space" to convention attendees. Eventually, convention goers recognized who Cain was, and he and the others involved were forced to leave. When asked about the stunt, Cain said he distributed the signs as "irony" and stated, "It's amazing how many people took one and thanked us. They said they would put it in front of their house. I think it's funny. Nobody should put this in front of their house."

=== Threats against Beto O'Rourke ===
In September 2019, Cain threatened former U.S. Congressman Beto O'Rourke after O'Rourke called for gun control measures during the 2020 United States presidential election as a Democratic candidate. Cain said, "My AR is ready for you Robert Francis [O'Rourke's first and middle name]." O'Rourke labeled the tweet a "death threat", and replied to Cain with a tweet reading, "Clearly, you shouldn't own an AR-15 — and neither should anyone else". Cain responded with a tweet, "You're a child Robert Francis."

Twitter gave Cain 12 hours to remove the post. After he did not, the company removed Cain's "My AR is ready for you" tweet, saying it was against the site's policy against violent threats. Cain was suspended from Twitter for 141 days.

On January 31, 2020, the day the social media company lifted its suspension of Cain's Twitter account, Cain tweeted a screenshot of the interaction between him and O'Rourke writing, "But seriously @twitter, y'all banned me for this."

== Personal life ==
Cain is married with five children, all boys and all named after Texas counties. He is a nondenominational Christian.

On April 25, 2019, during the Texas House's formal recognition of Autism Awareness Month, he stated that he has been diagnosed with Asperger syndrome, and struggles maintaining eye contact as a result.

He serves with the rank of captain in the Texas State Guard.
