= 2002 French gene therapy trials =

The 2002 French gene therapy trials were experimental gene therapy trials performed on children suffering from severe combined immunodeficiency (SCID). The trials were based in Paris and led by researchers Alain Fischer and Marina Cavazzana-Calvo. Whilst the experiment initially seemed successful, many of the children began showing symptoms of various cancer-like diseases as a result of the gene manipulation. The experiment, and others like it, were subsequently shut down.

== Trials ==
The trials took place at the Necker Hospital in Paris, France in 2002. The lead researchers were Dr. Alain Fischer and Dr. Marina Cavazzana-Calvo, who were both employed by the hospital. The researchers were investigating treatments for severe combined immune deficiency (SCID), a disease that had been linked to the X-chromosome. SCID has the effect of preventing the formation of several key immune system factors that aid in the body's ability to fight of infectious diseases. The goal of the gene therapy was to utilize and activate hematopoietic stem cells (HSCs) in the hopes of combating the progression of the immune deficiency. The methodology of the experiment involved using retroviral vectors to stimulate the HSCs, which had been implicated in potential treatment for several communicable and non-communicable diseases. SCID was rare in its prevalence and involved a complex mechanism that involved harmful lymphocytic differentiation. The test subjects for this experiment were 11 children of various ages who presented with SCID and were admitted into Necker Hospital. Initially, after the therapy was administered to the children, some showed signs of improved conditions. One child, a three-year-old, became the face of the experiment's success, as the symptoms of his once life-threatening disease began to diminish. This was a breakthrough in the application capabilities of gene therapy in treating various morbidities.

In the months following the application of the gene therapy, several of the 11 children began to show signs of new disease symptoms that were seemingly a direct result of their participation in the experimental trial. Two of the children, including the three-year-old boy, began showing signs of various cancer-like diseases. The most prevalent of these "vector-triggered" cancers seemed to present with the same symptoms of leukemia, the abnormal proliferation of leukocytes in the bone marrow and other organs. These symptoms were characterized as "leukemia-like lymphocyte proliferation" seemingly activated by the retroviral vectors used during the duration of the experiment. While the majority of the children involved in the trial did not show these symptoms, the presentation of this leukemia-like cancer in the 2 subjects was a cause for concern and reported by Dr. Fischer and Dr. Cavazzana-Calvo.

== Post-trial and legacy ==
Following the reporting of the 2 subjects with leukemia-like cancer, several steps were taken to reduce the likelihood of further unintended consequences. The experimental trial itself was immediately suspended and inquiries were made into how the cancer was activated and where responsibility for the trials would fall. Experimental trials with similar designs in neighboring European countries were allowed to continue, though they were cognizant of the negative results seen in France. In the United States, all experimental procedures that mimicked the methodology utilized in the French Trials were indefinitely suspended by the United States Food and Drug Administration (USFDA). Although the presentation of the disease was only seen in the French trials, the FDA stated that suspending the US trials was a "precautionary measure" to ensure that the results seen in France would not be replicated in the US. Beyond the US, the United Kingdom also voiced its concern for the French results and stated that similar trials in the UK would ensure safeguards against those harmful side-effects.

Although the trial caused very harmful side-effects in some of its subjects and was shut down as a result, for the most part it was successful in helping to suppress the symptoms of the immune deficiency in a majority of the children involved. The relative success of this trial lead to subsequent retroviral vector retrials, experimenting with different dose levels and precautions against the development of the cancer, within France itself. Though some more subjects showed signs of the cancer, the majority of the subjects showed improvement in their conditions stemming from the experiment. The mixed results of the French trial helped spark a worldwide debate about the efficacy of retroviral vector gene therapy, and gene therapy as a whole. More specifically, the trial led to the discussion as to whether or not the known risks of gene therapy, such as the possibility of subsequent cancer development, and the potential benefits of gene manipulation exist in a way that would justify the continued use of these trials to correct life-threatening illnesses.
