= Deer Park High School =

Deer Park High School can refer to:

- Deer Park Junior/Senior High School in Ohio
- Deer Park High School (New York), Deer Park, New York, on Long Island
- Deer Park High School (Texas)
- Deer Park High School (Washington State)
