= Kim Olson =

American military officer, non-profit executive, and politician

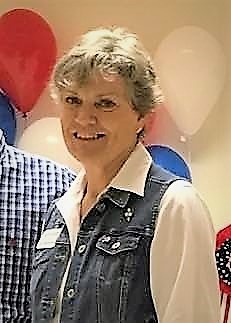
- Kim Olson at a town hall event in Nacogdoches Texas

Personal details
- Born: October 24, 1957 (age 68) Waukegan, Illinois, U.S.
- Party: Democratic
- Spouse: Kent
- Children: 2
- Education: Ohio State University (BA); Naval War College (MA); National Defense University (MA); Webster University (MBA)

Military service
- Allegiance: United States
- Branch/service: United States Air Force
- Years of service: 1979–2005
- Rank: Colonel

Kimberly D. Olson (born October 24, 1957) is an American non-profit executive, politician, and retired military officer from the state of Texas. She served in the United States Air Force for 25 years, reaching the rank of colonel. She was the Democratic Party nominee for Texas Agriculture Commissioner in the 2018 elections and a candidate in the 2020 elections seeking to represent Texas's 24th congressional district in the United States House of Representatives.

== Early life and education ==
Olson was born in Waukegan, Illinois. Her parents were teachers in the United States Department of Defense. Olson grew up on her family's farm in New Hampton, Iowa, and lived on military bases in Germany, Bermuda, and the Philippines. She graduated from Ohio State University in 1979 with a Bachelor of Arts degree in education. She also earned Master of Arts degrees in national security and strategic studies from the Naval War College and in national security strategy from the National Defense University, as well as Master of Business Administration from Webster University.

== Career ==
=== Military service ===
Olson joined the United States Air Force in 1979. She was the first woman to go through flight training at Laughlin Air Force Base and became one of the first female pilots in the Air Force. She served as a squadron commander of the 96th Air Refueling Squadron out of Fairchild Air Force Base, becoming one of only eight female squadron commanders. Olson reached the rank of colonel in 2000, and was assigned to the comptroller's office in The Pentagon in early 2003.

In 2003, General Jay Garner, the director of the Office for Reconstruction and Humanitarian Assistance, selected Olson to be his executive officer in helping to rebuild Iraq after Operation Iraqi Freedom. Three months into the role, Garner was replaced by Paul Bremer, and the Department of Defense charged Olson with providing improper assistance to a private security firm from South Africa. Though she denies the allegations, Olson accepted a non-judicial punishment rather than face a potential court martial by pleading guilty to administrative violations and accepting a written reprimand. She was allowed to retire with an honorable discharge without a reduction in rank, which she received in May 2005.

After her discharge, Olson founded Grace After Fire, a nonprofit organization that aids female military veterans when they return to civilian life. She also wrote a memoir, Iraq and Back: Inside the War to Win the Peace, which was published in 2006.

=== Politics ===
In 2007, Olson became the Director of Human Resources for the Dallas Independent School District. That year, she was elected to the school board of the Weatherford Independent School District (WISD), representing Place 3. She resigned her seat, effective September 1, 2011, because she and her husband decided to move out of Weatherford, which made her ineligible to serve on the WISD school board.

In the 2018 elections, Olson ran as a Democrat against Sid Miller for Texas Agriculture Commissioner. Miller defeated Olson in a close election. Olson ran for the United States House of Representatives in Texas's 24th congressional district in the 2020 elections. She advanced to a runoff election against Candace Valenzuela for the Democratic nomination. Olson was defeated by Valenzuela in the runoff, earning 39.6% of the vote compared to Valenzuela's 60.4%.

Following the run-off, Olson spent the rest of the election season raising money for women running for office in Texas. Through her PAC, WomenWin, Olson donated funds to dozens of women running for state house, county commissioner and judicial races.

== Personal life ==
Olson met her husband, Kent, while they both served as flight instructors for the Air Force in Arizona. They have an adult son and daughter and one grandchild, and live on a farm in Mineral Wells, Texas.

Olson is a Master Gardener. In 2014, she was inducted into the Texas Women's Hall of Fame.

== Bibliography ==
- Iraq and Back: Inside the War to Win the Peace. Naval Institute Press. 2006. p. 224. ISBN 978-1591145271.

Party political offices
Preceded by Jim Hogan	Democratic nominee for Agriculture Commissioner of Texas; 2018	Succeeded by Susan Hays
