= Severe combined immunodeficiency =

Genetic disorder leading to severe impairment of the immune system

- Other names: Swiss-type agammaglobulinemia, alymphocytosis, Glanzmann–Riniker syndrome, severe mixed immunodeficiency syndrome, thymic alymphoplasia
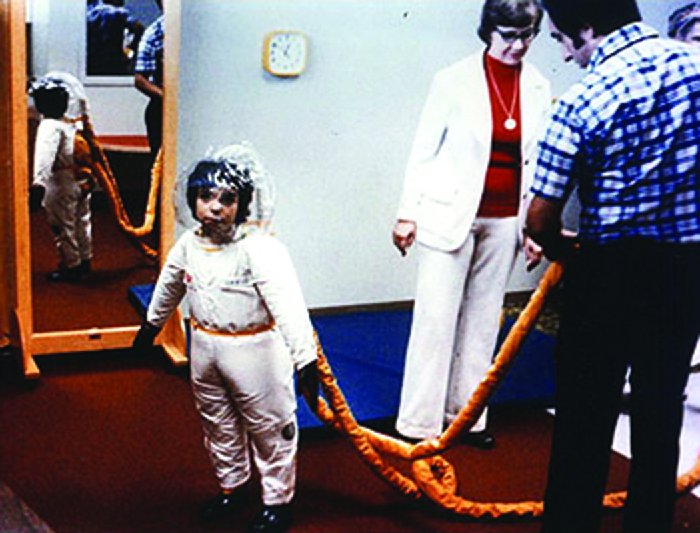
- David Vetter, a child born in 1971 with severe combined immunodeficiency (SCID).
- Specialty: Immunology
- Treatment: Bone marrow transplantation and prophylaxis against infection
- Medication: IVIG, gene therapy
- Frequency: 1 in 50,000 to 100,000 (X-linked form)

Severe combined immunodeficiencies (SCIDs) are a rare group of genetic disorders characterized by the body's inability to create functional T cells and B cells. SCIDs are the most severe form of primary immunodeficiency, making their sufferers extremely vulnerable to infection due to their highly compromised immune system. There are at least seven different known genes in which mutations lead to a form of SCID, each of which has different clinical presentations.

SCID involves defective antibody response due to either direct involvement with B lymphocytes or through improper B lymphocyte activation due to non-functional T-helper cells. Consequently, both "arms" (B cells and T cells) of the adaptive immune system are impaired due to a defect in one of several possible genes.

Some SCID sufferers, such as David Vetter, have become famous for living in a sterile environment to avoid infection, leading to the name bubble boy disease and bubble baby disease.

SCID patients are usually affected by severe bacterial, viral, or fungal infections early in life and often present with interstitial lung disease, chronic diarrhea, and failure to thrive. Ear infections, recurrent Pneumocystis jirovecii pneumonia, and profuse oral candidiasis commonly occur. These babies, if untreated, usually die within one year due to severe, recurrent infections unless they have undergone successful hematopoietic stem cell transplantation or gene therapy in clinical trials.

== Types ==
=== X-linked severe combined immunodeficiency ===
Most cases of SCID are due to mutations in the IL2RG gene encoding the common gamma chain (γ_{c}) (CD132), a protein that is shared by the receptors for interleukins IL-2, IL-4, IL-7, IL-9, IL-15 and IL-21. These interleukins and their receptors are involved in the development and differentiation of T and B cells. Because the common gamma chain is shared by many interleukin receptors, mutations that result in a non-functional common gamma chain cause widespread defects in interleukin signalling. The result is a near complete failure of the immune system to develop and function, with low or absent T cells and NK cells and non-functional B cells.
The common gamma chain is encoded by the gene IL-2 receptor gamma, or IL-2Rγ, which is located on the X-chromosome. For this reason, immunodeficiency caused by mutations in IL-2Rγ is known as X-linked severe combined immunodeficiency. The condition is inherited in an X-linked recessive pattern.

=== Adenosine deaminase deficiency ===
The second most common form of SCID after X-SCID is caused by a defective enzyme, adenosine deaminase (ADA), necessary for the breakdown of purines. Lack of ADA causes accumulation of dATP. This metabolite will inhibit the activity of ribonucleotide reductase, the enzyme that reduces ribonucleotides to generate deoxyribonucleotides. The effectiveness of the immune system depends upon lymphocyte proliferation and hence dNTP synthesis. Without functional ribonucleotide reductase, lymphocyte proliferation is inhibited and the immune system is compromised.

=== Purine nucleoside phosphorylase deficiency ===
An autosomal recessive disorder involving mutations of the purine nucleoside phosphorylase (PNP) gene. PNP is a key enzyme in the purine salvage pathway. Impairment of this enzyme causes elevated dGTP levels resulting in T-cell toxicity and deficiency.

=== Reticular dysgenesis ===
Inability of granulocyte precursors to form granules secondary to mitochondrial adenylate kinase 2 (AK2) malfunction.

=== Omenn syndrome ===
The manufacture of immunoglobulins requires recombinase enzymes derived from the recombination activating genes RAG-1 and RAG-2. These enzymes are involved in the first stage of V(D)J recombination, the process by which segments of a B cell or T cell's DNA are rearranged to create a new T cell receptor or B cell receptor (and, in the B cell's case, the template for antibodies).
Certain mutations of the RAG-1 or RAG-2 genes prevent V(D)J recombination, causing SCID.

=== Bare lymphocyte syndrome ===
In type 1, MHC class I is not expressed on the cell surface. The defect is caused by defective TAP proteins, not the MHC-I protein. In type 2, MHC class II is not expressed on the cell surface of all antigen presenting cells. Autosomal recessive. The MHC-II gene regulatory proteins are what is altered, not the MHC-II protein itself.

=== JAK3 mutation ===
Janus kinase-3 (JAK3) is an enzyme that mediates transduction downstream of the γ_{c} signal. Mutation of its gene causes SCID.

=== DCLRE1C mutation ===
DCLRE1C "Artemis" is a gene required for DNA repair and V(D)J recombination. A recessive loss-of-function mutation found in the Navajo and Apache population causes SCID and radiation intolerance.

=== PRKDC mutation ===
PRKDC or DNA-PKcs is a gene required for DNA repair and V(D)J recombination. First found in non-human animals with SCID, a human case was finally found in 2009, followed by another in 2013.

== Diagnosis ==
Early diagnosis of SCID is usually difficult due to the need for advanced screening techniques. Several symptoms may indicate a possibility of SCID in a child, such as a family history of infant death, chronic coughs, hyperinflated lungs, and persistent infections. A full blood lymphocyte count is often considered a reliable manner of diagnosing SCID, but higher lymphocyte counts in childhood may influence results. Clinical diagnosis based on genetic defects is also a possible diagnostic procedure that has been implemented in the UK.

Some SCID can be detected by sequencing fetal DNA if a known history of the disease exists. Otherwise, SCID is not diagnosed until about six months of age, usually indicated by recurrent infections. The delay in detection is because newborns carry their mothers' antibodies for the first few weeks of life and SCID babies look normal.

=== Newborn screening ===
Several countries test all newborns for SCID as a part of routine newborn screening. A measure using real-time quantitative PCR of the blood concentration of T-cell receptor excision circles (TRECs), which are reduced in SCID, is the method used to screen all U.S. newborns for SCID.

As of September 2022, the known percentage of newborns screened has increased throughout the world with 100% in the United States, 100% in Australia, 78% in Europe, 32% in Latin America, 26% in the Middle East and North Africa, 13% in Asia-Pacific, and 0% in Central America. The introduction of newborn screenings and genetic testing in many countries has allowed early detection and treatment before the development of severe infections, which progressively improved the five-year survival rate for newborns with SCID to around 90%.

== Treatment ==
The most common treatment for SCID is bone marrow transplantation, which has been very successful using either a matched related or unrelated donor, or a half-matched donor, who would be either parent. The half-matched type of transplant is called haploidentical. Haploidentical bone marrow transplants require the donor marrow to be depleted of all mature T cells to avoid the occurrence of graft-versus-host disease (GVHD). Consequently, a functional immune system takes longer to develop in a patient who receives a haploidentical bone marrow transplant compared to a patient receiving a matched transplant. The first reported case of successful transplant was a Spanish child patient who was interned in Memorial Sloan Kettering Cancer Center in 1982, in New York City. David Vetter, the original "bubble boy", had one of the first transplantations also, but eventually died because of an unscreened virus, Epstein-Barr (tests were not available at the time), in his newly transplanted bone marrow from his sister, an unmatched bone marrow donor. Today, transplants done in the first three months of life have a high success rate. Physicians have also had some success with in utero transplants done before the child is born and also by using cord blood which is rich in stem cells. In utero transplants allow for the fetus to develop a functional immune system in the sterile environment of the uterus; however complications such as GVHD would be difficult to detect or treat if they were to occur.

More recently gene therapy has been attempted as an alternative to the bone marrow transplant. Transduction of the missing gene to hematopoietic stem cells using viral vectors is being tested in ADA SCID and X-linked SCID. In 1990, four-year-old Ashanthi DeSilva became the first patient to undergo successful gene therapy. Researchers collected samples of DeSilva's blood, isolated some of her white blood cells, and used a retrovirus to insert a healthy adenosine deaminase (ADA) gene into them. These cells were then injected back into her body, and began to express a normal enzyme. This, augmented by weekly injections of ADA, corrected her deficiency. However, the concurrent treatment of ADA injections may impair the success of gene therapy, since transduced cells will have no selective advantage to proliferate if untransduced cells can survive in the presence of the injected ADA.

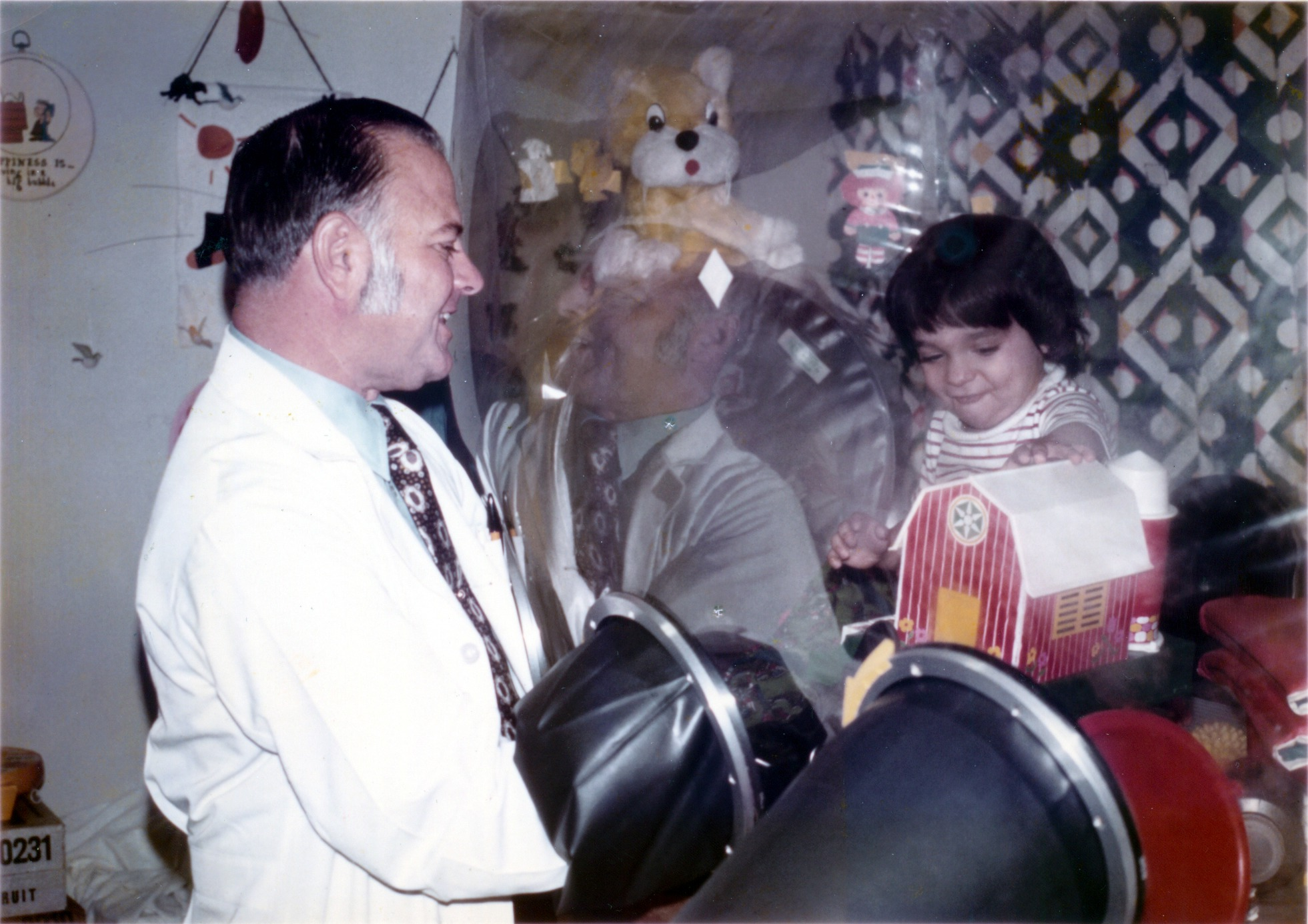
David Vetter inside his protective "bubble."

In 2000, a gene therapy "success" resulted in SCID patients with a functional immune system. These trials were stopped when it was discovered that two of ten patients in one trial had developed leukemia resulting from the insertion of the gene-carrying retrovirus near an oncogene. By 2007, four of the ten patients had developed leukemias. Work aimed at improving gene therapy is now focusing on modifying the viral vector to reduce the likelihood of oncogenesis and using zinc-finger nucleases to further target gene insertion. No leukemia cases have yet been seen in trials of ADA-SCID, which does not involve the gamma c gene that may be oncogenic when expressed by a retrovirus.

From the treatments of Ashanthi DeSilva in 1990, which is considered gene therapy's first success until 2014, around 60 patients were treated for either ADA-SCID or X-SCID using retroviruses vectors. As previously mentioned, the occurrence of leukemia cases forced researchers to make changes to improve safety. In 2019, a new method using an altered version of the HIV virus as a lentivirus vector was reported in the treatment of eight children with X-SCID, and in 2021 the same method was used in 50 children with ADA-SCID, obtaining positive results in 48 of them.

There are also some non-curative methods for treating SCID. Reverse isolation involves the use of laminar air flow and mechanical barriers to avoid physical contact with others in order to isolate the patient from any harmful pathogens present in the external environment. Another non-curative treatment for patients with ADA-SCID is enzyme replacement therapy, in which the patient is injected with polyethyleneglycol-coupled adenosine deaminase (PEG-ADA), which metabolizes the toxic substrates of the ADA enzyme and prevents their accumulation. Treatment with PEG-ADA may be used to restore T cell function in the short term, enough to clear any existing infections before proceeding with curative treatment such as a bone marrow transplant.

== Epidemiology ==
The most commonly quoted figure for the prevalence of SCID is around one in 100,000 births, although this is regarded by some to be an underestimate of the true prevalence; some estimates predict that the prevalence rate is as high as one in 50,000 live births. A figure of about one in 65,000 live births has been reported for Australia.

Due to the particular genetic nature of SCID, a higher prevalence may be found in certain regions and associated cultures where higher rates of consanguineous mating occur (i.e. mating between blood relatives). A Moroccan study reported that consanguineous parenting was observed in 75% of the families of Moroccan SCID patients.

Recent studies indicate that one in every 2,500 children in the Navajo population inherit severe combined immunodeficiency. This condition is a significant cause of illness and death among Navajo children. Ongoing research reveals a similar genetic pattern among the related Apache people.

== SCID in animals ==
SCID mice were and still are used in disease, vaccine, and transplant research, especially as animal models for testing the safety of new vaccines or therapeutic agents in people with weakened immune system. SCID mice also serve as a useful animal model in the study of the human immune system and its interactions with disease, infections, and cancer. For example, normal strains of mice can be lethally irradiated, killing all rapidly dividing cells. These mice then receive bone marrow transplantation from SCID donors, allowing engraftment of human peripheral blood mononuclear cells (PBMC) to occur. This method can be used to study whether T cell-lacking mice can perform hematopoiesis after receiving human PBMC.

A recessive gene, with clinical signs similar to the human condition, affects the Arabian horse. The condition remains a fatal disease, as the horse inevitably succumbs to an opportunistic infection within the first four to six months of life. However, carriers, who themselves are not affected by the disease, can be detected with a DNA test. Therefore, careful breeding practices can avoid the risk of an affected foal being produced.

Another animal with well-characterized SCID pathology is the dog. There are two known forms: an X-linked SCID in Basset Hounds that has similar ontology to X-SCID in humans and an autosomal recessive form seen in one line of Jack Russell Terriers that is similar to SCID in Arabian horses and mice.

== See also ==
- David Vetter
- Aisha Chaudhary
- List of cutaneous conditions
- List of radiographic findings associated with cutaneous conditions
