= Candace Valenzuela =

American politician

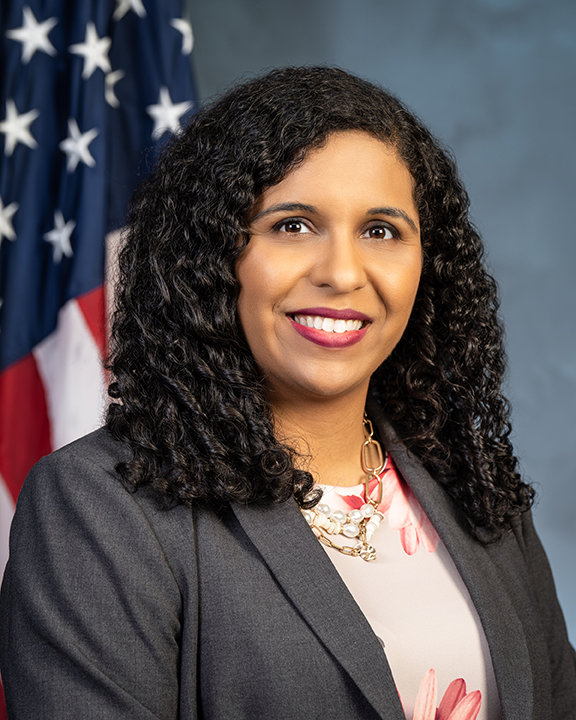

Member-elect of the Denton County Commissioners Court from Precinct 2
- Incumbent
- Assumed office TBD
- Preceded by: Devan Allen

Regional Administrator for the United States Department of Housing and Urban Development
- In office March 18, 2022 – 2025
- Preceded by: Michael Burley

Personal details
- Born: 1984 (age 41–42) El Paso, Texas, U.S.
- Party: Democratic
- Spouse: Andy
- Children: 2
- Education: Claremont McKenna College (BA)

Candace Valenzuela (born 1984) is an American politician from the state of Texas. She is a member-elect of the Denton County Commissioners Court from Precinct 2, having been elected in 2026. Valenzuela previously served as a regional administrator for the United States Department of Housing and Urban Development from 2022 to 2025 after being appointed to the role by Joe Biden and was previously the Democratic Party's nominee for Texas's 24th congressional district in 2020.

== Early life and education ==
Valenzuela was born in 1984 to a Mexican-American mother and an African-American father in El Paso, Texas. Her parents served in the United States Armed Forces. As they weren't married, her mother, Mary Valenzuela, was not allowed to include her father on the birth certificate, and she gave her daughter her surname. Candace's parents married at Fort Hood, but divorced two years later.

After her mother left the military, the family lost their home. They stayed with her grandparents, with a Mormon family, and at a homeless shelter. At times when they had no place to stay, she slept behind a convenience store.

Valenzuela earned a full scholarship to Claremont McKenna College, where she earned a Bachelor of Arts in government.

== Career ==
=== Carollton-Farmers Branch ISD school board ===
In 2017, Valenzuela was elected to the school board for Carrollton-Farmers Branch Independent School District, defeating an 18 year incumbent. She resigned in December 2019.

=== 2020 U.S. House of Representatives campaign ===
In April 2019, Valenzuela announced that she would run as a Democrat in the 2020 elections for the United States House of Representatives in Texas's 24th congressional district, held by Republican Kenny Marchant. Marchant announced he would not seek reelection in August 2019. In the primary election, Valenzuela and Kim Olson advanced to a runoff election. Valenzuela defeated Olson in the runoff, and faced Beth Van Duyne in the November general election. Van Duyne defeated Valenzuela in the general election.

=== U.S. Department of Housing and Urban Development ===
In March 2022, President Joe Biden appointed Valenzuela as the regional administrator for the United States Department of Housing and Urban Development (HUD), overseeing Texas, Oklahoma, New Mexico, Louisiana, and Arkansas; this is the same position held by Van Duyne during the Trump administration.

=== 2026 Denton County Commission campaign ===
In December 2025, Valenzuela filed to run for Precinct 2 of the Denton County Commission against incumbent Republican Kevin Falconer. She was unopposed in the Democratic primary election and defeated him in the general election.

== Personal life ==
Valenzuela and her husband, Andy, have two children. They live in Dallas, Texas.
