= Charles Holcomb =

American judge (1933–2020)

Place 8 Judge of the Texas Court of Criminal Appeals
- In office 2001–2010
- Preceded by: Steve Mansfield
- Succeeded by: Elsa Alcala

Personal details
- Born: September 8, 1933 Alto, Texas, U.S.
- Died: February 28, 2020 (aged 86) Wimberley, Texas, U.S.
- Party: Republican
- Education: Lee College Lamar University South Texas College of Law

Military service
- Branch/service: United States Air Force Reserve

Charles Ruford Holcomb (September 8, 1933 – February 28, 2020) was an American judge who served on the Texas Court of Criminal Appeals from 2001 to 2010.

== Life and career ==
Holcomb graduated from Robert E. Lee High School. He attended Lee College in Baytown and Lamar University in Beaumont, Texas, for his undergraduate education. He served in the United States Air Force Reserve from 1951 to 1953; he then graduated in 1958 from South Texas College of Law.

From 1959 to 1966, he was the city attorney, first for Deer Park and then for Orange in far southeastern Texas. In 1967, he was elected to the County Court at Law of Orange County and served until 1972. During the school term of 1970–1971, he was also adjunct professor of Government at the Lamar University extension campus in Orange.

From 1972 to 1981, he was in private practice with Cox, Holcomb & Sinclair, contemporaneously serving Cherokee County as county attorney from 1974 until 1981, when he was elected district attorney for the same county, a position he retained until 1991.

In 1992, he was elected as a Democrat for the position of Justice of the Twelfth Court of Appeals, a post he held 1998. From 1998 to 2000, he sat by assignment in trial and appellate courts as a senior judge. Judge Holcomb was elected to the Texas Court of Criminal Appeals in 2000 as a Republican. His term on the Court of Criminal Appeals began in 2001. Holcomb, then seventy-one, was required by law not to serve as an active judge after he turned seventy-five in September 2008.

He faced two challengers for re-election in the Republican primary election in 2006, Judge Robert Francis of Dallas, and then State Representative Terry Keel of Austin. Keel challenged both Holcomb and Francis for technical flaws in their applications to be on the ballot. Holcomb's candidacy was affirmed by the Texas Supreme Court and he won re-nomination and reelection. After his re-election, the Texas Constitution was amended to allow judges who turn seventy-five during their term to serve-out a four-year term, meaning Holcomb could serve four years of his six-year term. Holcomb retired from the Court of Criminal Appeals in 2010 and decided to run for the Senate election in 2012, but the nomination instead went to Ted Cruz, who won the party runoff election against David Dewhurst.

Holcomb died in Wimberley, Texas on February 28, 2020, at the age of 86.

Legal offices
Preceded by Steve Mansfield	Place 8 Judge of the Texas Court of Criminal Appeals; 2001–2010	Succeeded by Elsa Alcala
