= Michelle Slaughter =

American judge (born 1978)

Judge of the Texas Court of Criminal Appeals
- In office January 1, 2019 – December 31, 2024
- Preceded by: Elsa Alcala
- Succeeded by: Lee Finley

Personal details
- Born: 1978 (age 47–48)
- Party: Republican
- Education: University of Houston (BA, JD)

Michelle Slaughter (born 1978) is a former Judge of the Texas Court of Criminal Appeals.

== Education ==
Slaughter received her Bachelor of Arts from the University of Houston and her Juris Doctor from the University of Houston Law Center in 2004.

== Legal career ==
Upon graduating law school, she clerked with Haynes and Boone. Before taking the bench she was a managing member at Slaughter & Hammock and from 2005 to 2010 practiced at Locke Lord.

== State judicial service ==
Slaughter campaigned to be a Judge for the 405th District Court of Galveston County and took office in 2013. In 2015, she was cleared of any wrongdoing by a judicial panel after concern was raised over personal Facebook posts regarding a trial she was overseeing.

In March 2018, she won the Republican primary to be a Judge on the Texas Court of Criminal Appeals. Her opponent in the General Election was Libertarian Mark Ash. She went on to win the general election, receiving 4,760,576 votes or 74% of the vote. Her term on the Texas Criminal Court of Appeals began on January 1, 2019 and she replaced Judge Elsa Alcala.

In 2024, Slaughter was defeated in the Republican primary by attorney Lee Finley.

== Personal life ==
Slaughter is a Republican.

Judge, Court of Criminal Appeals Place 8: 2018 General Election Results
Year	Republican	Votes	Pct	Libertarian	Votes	Pct
2018	Michelle Slaughter	4,760,576	74.68%	Mark Ash	1,614,119	25.32%

Legal offices
Preceded by Elsa Alcala	Judge of the Texas Court of Criminal Appeals; 2019–2025	Succeeded by Lee Finley
