= Deer Park Independent School District =

School district in Texas, United States

Location
- Deer Park, Texas Houston; United States
- Coordinates: 29.72552°N 95.09149°W

District information
- Type: Public
- Established: 1922; 104 years ago
- Schools: 15
- NCES District ID: 4816530

Students and staff
- Students: 12,122 (2023–2024)
- Teachers: 827.40 (on an FTE basis) (2023–2024)
- Staff: 1,125.00 (on an FTE basis) (2023–2024)
- Student–teacher ratio: 14.65 (2023–2024)

Other information
- Website: www.dpisd.org

Deer Park Independent School District is a public school district in Deer Park, Texas in the Houston metropolitan area.

It includes most of Deer Park and sections of Pasadena and Houston, as well as a small piece of La Porte.

== History ==
The school district is traceable to 1922, when a single elementary facility opened on Deer Park's Center Street along Highway 225. In 1929, the small school (approximately 30 students) was greatly expanded, and additional facilities were created in neighboring areas. The district was officially formed for the school year of 1930. Today, it serves most of Deer Park, a portion of Pasadena and La Porte, and the unincorporated area of Lynchburg. Its total enrollment is approximately 12,300 students.

In 2009, the school district was rated "recognized" by the Texas Education Agency.

== List of schools ==
=== Elementary schools ===
- Deepwater Elementary, established 1954
- San Jacinto Elementary, established 1957
- W.A. Carpenter Elementary, established 1959
- Deer Park Elementary, established 1969
- Parkwood Elementary, established 1971
- J.P. Dabbs Elementary, established 1977
- Fairmont Elementary, established 1990
- Early Childhood Center

=== Junior High schools ===
- Deer Park Junior High, established 1955
- Deepwater Junior High, established 1964
- J.P. Bonnette Junior High, established 1979
- Fairmont Junior High, established 1994

=== High schools ===
- Deer Park High School – North Campus (9th grade), established 1951 as original high school, established 1974 as North Campus
- Deer Park High School – South Campus (10th–12th grades), established 1974
- Deer Park High School – Wolters Campus

=== University Interscholastic League (UIL) ===
Several of Deer Park High School's athletic and fine arts programs have placed in state competitions or won state championships.

- 1982 UIL AAAAA State Champions – One Act Play
- 2012 UIL AAAAA State Champions – Softball
- 2012 UIL AAAAA State Qualifying – One Act Play
- 2014 UIL AAAAA State Qualifying – One Act Play
- 2017 UIL AAAAA State Champions – Baseball
- 2021 UIL AAAAA State Champions – Softball
