= Texas's 128th House of Representatives district =

American legislative district

Texas's 128th State House of Representatives district
Representative
Briscoe Cain; R–Deer Park
- Demographics: 44.7% White; 12.1% Black; 39.5% Hispanic; 2.5% Asian
- Population (2020) • Voting age: 192,949; 142,045

The 128th district of the Texas House of Representatives contains parts of Harris County. The current representative is Briscoe Cain, who was first elected in 2016.
