= T-cell receptor excision circles =

T-cell receptor excision circles (TRECs) are small circles of DNA created in T-cells during their passage through the thymus as they rearrange their TCR genes. Their presence indicates maturation of T cells; TRECs are reduced in SCID (severe combined immunodeficiency disease).

Signal joint T-cell receptor excision circles (sjTRECs) might be used as a way to test the age of the individual from a blood sample. The detection of sjTRECs can be further used as a diagnostic tool to monitor the thymic output (e.g., following hematopoietic stem cell transplantation or in cases of AIDS).

== See also ==
- T cell receptor
- V(D)J recombination
