= Deer Park, Texas =

- City
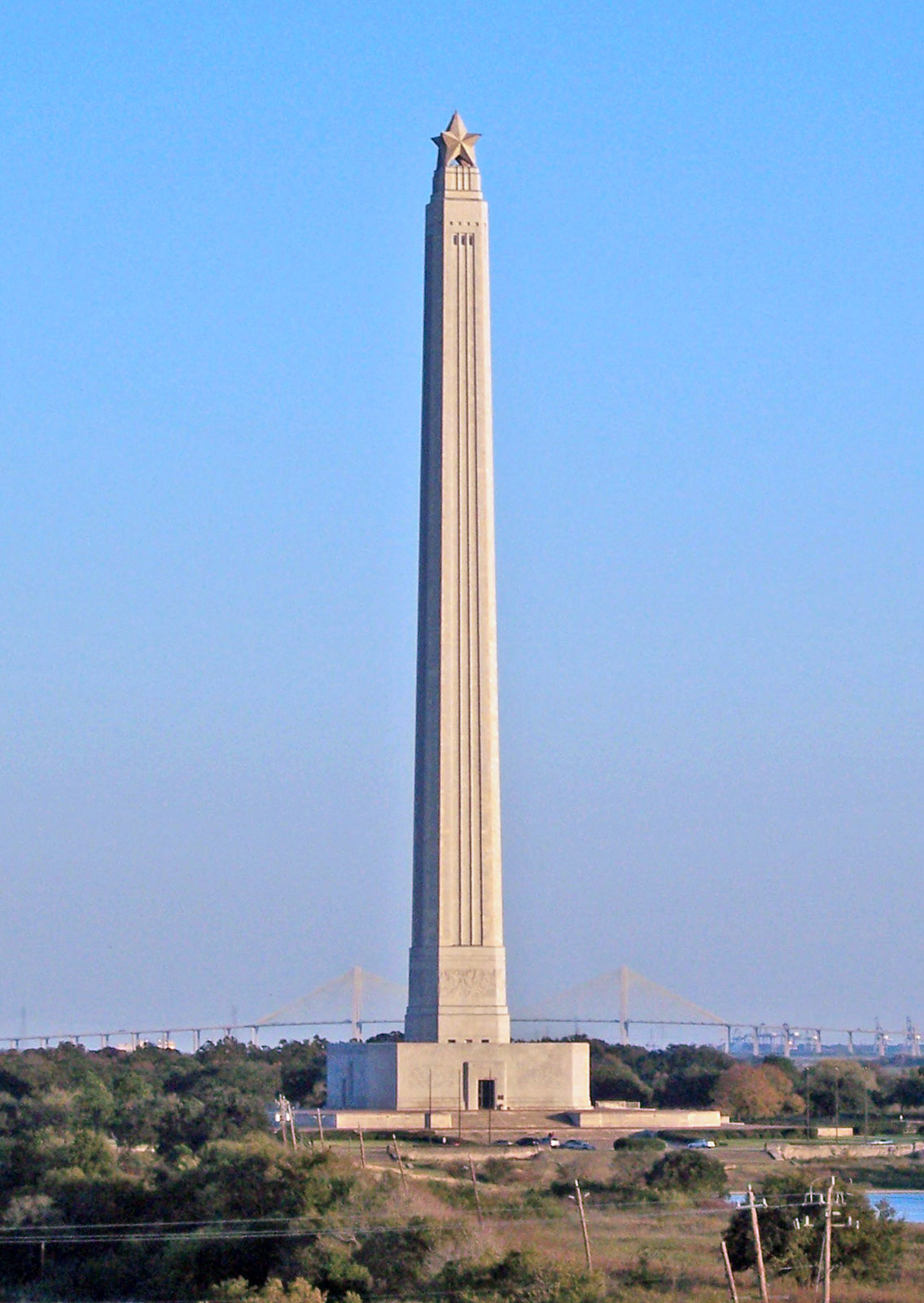
- San Jacinto Monument in 2006
- Nickname: "Birthplace of Texas"
- Location in Harris County in the state of Texas
- Coordinates: 29°41′31″N 95°07′05″W
- Country: United States
- State: Texas
- County: Harris
- Incorporated: 1948

Government
  - Type: Council-Manager
  - City Council: Mayor Jerry Mouton; Sherry Garrison; Thane Harrison; Tommy Ginn; Bill Patterson; Ron Martin; Georgette Ford
  - City Manager: James Stokes

Area
  - Total: 10.57 sq mi (27.37 km^{2})
  - Land: 10.51 sq mi (27.21 km^{2})
  - Water: 0.062 sq mi (0.16 km^{2})
- Elevation: 26 ft (7.9 m)

Population (2020)
  - Total: 34,495
  - Density: 3,186.3/sq mi (1,230.23/km^{2})
- Time zone: UTC-6 (CST)
  - Summer (DST): UTC-5 (CDT)
- ZIP code: 77536
- Area codes: 713, 281, 832, 346, 621
- FIPS code: 48-19624
- GNIS feature ID: 1334219
- Website: www.deerparktx.gov

Deer Park is a city in the U.S. state of Texas within the Houston–Pasadena–The Woodlands metropolitan area. The city is located in southeast Harris County. As of the 2020 census, Deer Park had a population of 34,495.

Deer Park is the home to several major industrial facilities, including the Shell Chemicals plant, the Pemex refinery, and the Dow Chemical plant (formerly Rohm and Haas).

== History ==
Deer Park was founded in 1892 by Simeon H. West, a farmer, retired legislator, and much-traveled adventurer from Illinois. He named the town for the large number of deer that roamed the Gulf plains. A railroad station opened later that year and a post office followed in 1893.

The subdivision was established in 1893 and was the site of a Galveston, Harrisburg and San Antonio Railway station by about 1894. A Deer Park post office was established in 1893, discontinued in 1919, and reestablished in 1930. In 1896, the community, with a population of forty, had a hotel, a general store, and three resident carpenters. By 1922, Deer Park had dwindled down to almost nothing with four houses, one little schoolhouse, and an old hotel with a few scattered shacks along the railroad right-of-way. In 1928, Shell Oil Company broke ground on a new refinery. In the 1930s, an independent school district was established. By 1940, the population had grown to 100. By 1946, however, the area began to flourish as Deer Park became the site of refineries and toluene plants for the production of TNT.

The citizens of Deer Park voted to incorporate on December 12, 1948, and a few weeks later Earl E. Dunn became the first mayor. Because of the 1948 incorporation, Houston did not incorporate Deer Park's territory into its city limits. The first city council meeting was held on February 7, 1949. The population had grown to 700 by 1948, to 5,000 by 1960 with a fire station, city hall, playground parks and an independent city water supply. A public library was begun in 1962 on Center Street. Population was 12,773 in 1970, and 28,520 in 2000. This growth has been fueled by the growth of the petrochemical industry as well as the growth of business along the Houston Ship Channel. Deer Park has a school district with 14 campuses, a city library, community theater, municipal court building, three fire stations, numerous city parks and recreational facilities, state-of-the-art water and sewer processing facilities, a post office, several hotels, 14 major industries as well as several light industrial companies. Today, Deer Park has approximately 9,000 homes and more than 30,000 residents.

Deer Park is near the site of the Battle of San Jacinto, where, on April 21, 1836, Texas won its independence from Mexico. Because the initial surrender treaty after the battle was drafted in Dr. George Moffitt Patrick's cabin, Deer Park bills itself as the "Birthplace of Texas". The original cabin was located on Buffalo Bayou where Rohm and Haas, now owned by Dow Chemical Company, established a chemical plant in Deer Park. A replica of Dr. Patrick's cabin is in front of the Theatre/Courts Building on Center Street. The Texas State Historical sign marker was relocated from the Dow Chemical parking lot to the replica log cabin home of Dr. Patrick located at the Theatre/Courts Building.

=== Shell Chemical plant explosion ===
On June 22, 1997, an ethylene explosion occurred at the nearby Shell Chemical Company plant that was heard and felt as far as 25 miles (40 km) away. While no evacuation of the city was ordered, residents living within a mile west of the plant were advised to remain inside their homes.

=== Intercontinental Terminals Company's chemical fire ===
On March 17, 2019, a chemical fire broke out at Intercontinental Terminals Company. The fire, which was caused from a pump seal failure, eventually spread to a dozen tanks. The resultant fire and smoke plume could be seen for miles and lasted for three days. The tanks involved in the fire contained chemicals including xylene, naptha, pyrolysis gasoline (Pygas), and toluene. Deer Park residents were required to shelter in place during the fire. A probe by the U.S. Chemical Safety and Hazard Investigation Board concluded that leaking chemicals had accumulated in an above-ground storage tank for about 30 minutes before they ignited. In April 2024, the state of Texas and the U.S. government reached a $6.6 million settlement with ITC; the money will be used to reimburse the state and federal government for damages caused by the blaze.

=== 2023 tornado ===
Deer Park has been known for several smaller and less destructive tornadoes in its past, but on January 24, 2023, a large EF3 tornado hit downtown Deer Park. It caused damage most notably to the local skating rink, a nursing home, an animal shelter and knocked out power to many areas, including schools in the Deer Park Independent School District. Schools were still in session at the time of the tornado, and were dismissed late, and closed the remainder of the week. 3 injuries occurred as the tornado passed. Entire neighborhoods were severely damaged as a result of the tornado. The tornado prompted the first ever tornado emergency issued by the National Weather Service in League City.

=== 2023 Shell refinery explosion ===
In May 2023, a Shell petrochemical plant in Deer Park, causing a three-day blaze that resulted in toxic contamination in the air and water. The Shell plant had a long history of chemical incidents between 2016 and 2022, including 68 emissions events that released 974,847 pounds of toxic emissions into the air. The company had eight "excessive" events at the plant during that time.

=== 2023 Emergency siren overhaul ===
Deer Park's 10 emergency warning sirens began experiencing failures over the years following a 2019 upgrade on the former siren system. In August 2023, the City of Deer Park replaced all 10 outdoor warning sirens with rotating, more efficient sirens. That also included strobe lights on each siren across the city to make fit for the hearing-impaired. 17-year-old deaf citizen William Stokes, presented the idea to the city during the replacement project. Emergency sirens are tested every Saturday at 12:00 PM.

== Geography and Climate ==
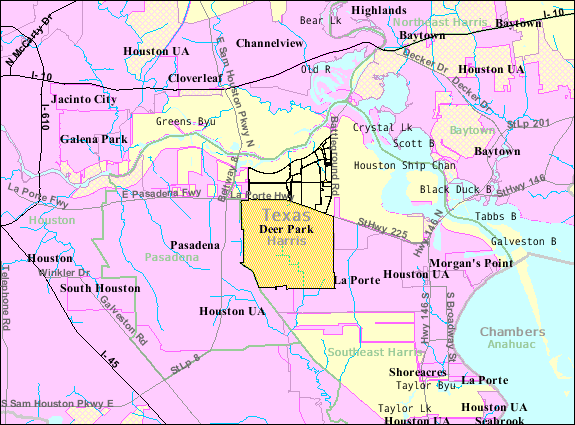
Map of Deer Park

Deer Park is located in Southeastern Harris County at 29°41′31″N 95°7′5″W (29.692003, –95.118108). According to the United States Census Bureau, the city has a total area of 10.52 square miles (27.25 km^{2}), of which 10.46 square miles (27.08 km^{2}) are land and 0.07 square miles (0.17 km^{2}), or 0.62%, are water.

Deer Park is bounded by the city of La Porte to the south and east, and by the Houston Ship Channel—the dredged-out Buffalo Bayou—to the north.

Climate- As with the rest of the Houston area, Deer Park faces a Humid Subtropical climate: mild winters with an occasional cold spell, hot and humid summers, often receiving sea breeze thunderstorms on spring and summer afternoons. Rainfall is abundant year round, however, this area is prone to major rainfall events specifically between the months of May and October, especially during Hurricane Season. Twice has the Deer Park region seen incredible rainfall events from a Tropical Cyclone between 2001 and 2017. Tropical Storm Allison dumped 15-30" of rain throughout the region in June 2001, and Hurricane Harvey dropped 30-50" throughout the region in August 2017. Both events in a span of less than a week.

Climate data for Deer Park, Texas (1991-2020)
Month	Jan	Feb	Mar	Apr	May	Jun	Jul	Aug	Sep	Oct	Nov	Dec	Year
Average precipitation inches	4.45	3.40	3.58	4.27	4.93	6.51	5.10	5.52	5.20	5.27	4.16	4.89	57.28
Average precipitation mm	113	86	91	108	125	165	130	140	132	134	106	124	1,454
Source: https://www.ncei.noaa.gov/access/us-climate-normals/#dataset=normals-annualseasonal&timeframe=30&station=USC00414315

== Demographics ==
Historical population
Census	Pop.	Note	%±
1950	736		—
1960	4,865		561.0%
1970	12,773		162.5%
1980	22,648		77.3%
1990	27,652		22.1%
2000	28,520		3.1%
2010	32,010		12.2%
2020	34,495		7.8%
U.S. Decennial Census; 1850–1900 1910; 1920 1930 1940; 1950 1960 1970; 1980 1990 2000; 2010

As of the 2020 census, there were 34,495 people residing in the city.

=== Racial and ethnic composition ===
Deer Park city, Texas – Racial and ethnic composition Note: the US Census treats Hispanic/Latino as an ethnic category. This table excludes Latinos from the racial categories and assigns them to a separate category. Hispanics/Latinos may be of any race.
Race / Ethnicity (NH = Non-Hispanic)	Pop 2000	Pop 2010	Pop 2020	% 2000	% 2010	% 2020
White alone (NH)	23,048	22,257	19,238	80.81%	69.53%	55.77%
Black or African American alone (NH)	360	426	758	1.26%	1.33%	2.20%
Native American or Alaska Native alone (NH)	96	107	98	0.34%	0.33%	0.28%
Asian alone (NH)	314	461	446	1.10%	1.44%	1.29%
Native Hawaiian or Pacific Islander alone (NH)	21	18	21	0.07%	0.06%	0.06%
Other race alone (NH)	35	18	165	0.12%	0.06%	0.48%
Mixed race or Multiracial (NH)	305	305	1,055	1.07%	0.95%	3.06%
Hispanic or Latino (any race)	4,341	8,418	12,714	15.22%	26.30%	36.86%
Total	28,520	32,010	34,495	100.00%	100.00%	100.00%

=== 2020 census ===
As of the 2020 census, Deer Park had a median age of 37.1 years, 25.6% of residents under the age of 18, and 14.7% of residents 65 years of age or older. For every 100 females there were 97.2 males, and for every 100 females age 18 and over there were 94.8 males age 18 and over.

As of the 2020 census, there were 12,002 households in Deer Park, of which 39.2% had children under the age of 18 living in them. Of all households, 55.5% were married-couple households, 15.5% were households with a male householder and no spouse or partner present, and 23.8% were households with a female householder and no spouse or partner present. About 19.8% of all households were made up of individuals and 9.2% had someone living alone who was 65 years of age or older.

As of the 2020 census, there were 12,721 housing units, of which 5.7% were vacant. The homeowner vacancy rate was 0.9% and the rental vacancy rate was 13.2%.

As of the 2020 census, 100.0% of residents lived in urban areas, while 0.0% lived in rural areas.

Racial composition as of the 2020 census
Race	Number	Percent
White	23,097	67.0%
Black or African American	822	2.4%
American Indian and Alaska Native	310	0.9%
Asian	486	1.4%
Native Hawaiian and Other Pacific Islander	25	0.1%
Some other race	3,755	10.9%
Two or more races	6,000	17.4%
Hispanic or Latino (of any race)	12,714	36.9%

=== 2019 American Community Survey ===
By 2019, residents of Deer Park had a median gross rent of $1,170 and a median household income of $80,592. The per capita income was $33,083 and 7.3% of the population lived at or below the poverty line.

=== 2000 census ===
In 2000, the racial makeup of the city was 90.01% White, 1.31% African American, 0.41% Native American, 1.13% Asian, 0.13% Pacific Islander, 5.25% from other races, and 1.76% from two or more races. Hispanic or Latino of any race were 15.22% of the population.

In 2000, the median income for a household in the city was $61,334, and the median income for a family was $66,516. Males had a median income of $50,867 versus $30,926 for females. The per capita income for the city was $24,440. About 4.0% of families and 5.6% of the population were below the poverty line, including 5.4% of those under age 18 and 4.9% of those age 65 or over.

== Industries ==
- Dow: The Dow Chemical plant, formerly Rohm and Haas, is located in Deer Park. It is located on 900 acres along the Houston Ship Channel. The plant has approximately 700 employees.
- Lubrizol: Lubrizol Specialty Chemicals plant, occupying over 330 acres, employs approximately 1,000 people.
- Shell-Pemex: Shell Oil began operations at the Shell Oil Refinery in Deer Park on August 13, 1929. The Shell Chemicals plant opened in 1941. In January 2022, Shell sold its Deer Park refinery to Pemex, the state oil company of Mexico.

- Pemex: Pemex refinery, formerly the Shell refinery, has approximately 1,500 employees.

- Shell: Shell Chemicals plant in Deer Park occupies 1,200 acres along the Ship Channel. Shell Deer Park has about 1,500 employees.

== Government ==
=== Municipal government ===
The city has a council-manager form of government. The city council has seven elected members, including the mayor and six city council members. The city council sets the policies for city operations. The city manager, who is appointed by the city council, is responsible for administering city policies.

Deer Park City Hall is located at 710 E. San Augustine Street.

As of 2024, the City had 420 employees.

=== Public facilities ===
Library: The Deer Park Public Library has a collection of over 60,000 books. They also participate in inter-library loan programs. The first Deer Park Public Library was opened on September 20, 1961, in what had previously been a fire station. In 1965, the library became an official city department. The current library opened its doors in a newly constructed building on February 25, 1969. The library underwent two expansions — in 1993 and 2013. The latest renovation added new facilities, including a tech lab and a children's reading area. The library now has almost 19,000 square feet (1,750 square meters) of space.

The Deer Park Library is located at 3009 Center Street.

Post Office: Deer Park Post Office is located at 200 East San Augustine Street.

The first post office was established in 1893, and discontinued in 1919. A new post office was established in 1930.

Medical facilities: The designated public hospital for Deer Park is Ben Taub General Hospital in the Texas Medical Center.

=== State and federal voting districts ===
United States Congressional District

- Texas 36th congressional district

US Representative Brian Babin (R)

Texas State Senate Districts

- Texas Senate District 11

Texas Senator Larry Taylor (R)

- Senate District 6

Texas Senator Sylvia Garcia (D)

Texas State House Districts

- Texas House District 144

Representative Mary Ann Perez (D)

- Texas House District 128

Representative Briscoe Cain (R)

== Education ==
=== Primary and secondary education ===
==== Public schools ====
Most Deer Park pupils attend schools in Deer Park Independent School District (DPISD). A small number of students who live in Deer Park near the cross streets of Spencer and Luella attend school in the La Porte Independent School District (LPISD).

DPISD has one high school — Deer Park High School — that occupies two campuses; the North Campus houses 9th grade students, while the South Campus serves grades 10 to 12. Deer Park has four junior high schools — Deer Park Junior High, Bonnette Junior High, Deepwater Junior High, and Fairmont Junior High. Seven elementary schools serve the area as well. Deer Park ISD has an open enrollment program that allows students who do not reside within the boundaries of DPISD to attend DPISD Schools. LPISD has two elementary schools in Deer Park: College Park Elementary and Heritage Elementary. The 10,000-capacity Clyde Abshier Stadium is the home of the Deer Park Deer.

Colleges

Deer Park is also served by the San Jacinto College District, Central Campus.

== Notable people ==
- Briscoe Cain, member of the Texas House of Representatives
- Zane Gonzalez, NFL kicker
- Charles Holcomb, judge of the Texas Court of Criminal Appeals
- Ron White, comedian, Blue Collar Comedy Tour
- Ronald Clark O'Bryan, father who murdered his son with poisoned Halloween candy, and then proceeded to try to poison others to cover it up. Origin of the poisoned candy myth.
- Andy Pettitte, MLB pitcher for Houston Astros and New York Yankees
- Chelsi Smith, Miss Texas USA 1995, Miss USA 1995 and Miss Universe 1995
