= Elsa Alcala =

American judge

Elsa R. Alcala

Place 8 Judge of the Texas Court of Criminal Appeals
- In office May 2011 – December 31, 2018
- Preceded by: Charles Holcomb
- Succeeded by: Michelle Slaughter

Personal details
- Born: 1964 (age 61–62)
- Party: Democratic (2019–present); Republican (until 2019)
- Spouse: Dan Jeffry Spjut
- Children: 3
- Education: Texas A&M University–Kingsville; University of Texas School of Law

Elsa R. Alcala, also known as Elsa Spjut (born 1964), is a former Republican official who most recently served (2011–2018) as one of the nine judges of the Texas Court of Criminal Appeals. She was appointed to the Place 8 on the bench by then Governor Rick Perry, when Charles Holcomb stepped down to run in 2012 for the United States Senate. On July 16, 2019 she announced she was leaving the Republican Party to support Democrats at the state and national level.

== Background ==
Judge Alcala obtained her Bachelor of Arts degree from Texas A&M University in Kingsville, Texas. She holds a Juris Doctor degree from the University of Texas School of Law in Austin, where she was named to the Order of Barristers.

Alcala is married to Dan Jeffry Spjut (born 1961), an attorney and retired lieutenant of the Houston Police Department. He was elected on November 4, 2014, as a Republican to a Harris County Criminal Court at Law judgeship. Alcala has three children. Alcala lives in Houston.

== Legal career ==
Alcala was unopposed for the Republican nomination to the Court of Criminal Appeals for Place 8 in 2012 and faced no Democrat in the November 6 general election, when she polled 78.1 percent of the vote over William Bryan Strange III, the Libertarian Party candidate.

On December 29, 2016, Alcala announced she would not seek re-election after her term ends December 31, 2018.

From January 2, 2019 until May 31, 2019 Alcala worked as the policy director at Texas Defender Service during the 2019 legislative session.

== See also ==
- List of Hispanic and Latino American jurists
- List of first women lawyers and judges in Texas

Legal offices
Preceded by Charles Holcomb	Judge of the Texas Court of Criminal Appeals; 2011–2018	Succeeded by Michelle Slaughter
