= Texas Real Estate Commission =

The Texas Real Estate Commission (TREC) is the state agency that governs real estate practices in the state of Texas. The agency is headquartered at 1700 North Congress in Austin.

TREC is composed of nine members appointed by the Governor with the concurrence of the Texas Senate. The members are appointed for six-year terms, with the terms of three members expiring every two years. Six members must be licensed real estate brokers who have been engaged in the real estate brokerage business as their major occupations for at least five years preceding their appointments. Three members must be members of the general public who are not regulated by the Commission or employed by organizations regulated by or receiving funds from the Commission.

What Does The Texas Real Estate Commission Do?

1. Issue Real Estate Licenses
2. Renews Licenses
3. Enforces Real Estate Laws & Regulations

== Scope ==
TREC is the state's regulatory agency for the following:

1. Real Estate Brokers and Salespersons
2. Real Estate Inspectors
3. Real Estate Appraisers
4. Education Providers for Real Estate and Inspection Courses
5. Residential Service Companies
6. Timeshare Developers
7. Easement Or Right-of-Way (ERW) agents

== See also ==
- The Appraisal Foundation
