= Deer Park High School (Texas) =

Public high school in Deer Park, Texas, United States

Coordinates: 29.6881°N 95.1292°W

- 714 W. San Augustine; Deer Park, TX 77536 (South), 402 Ivy Ave, Deer Park, TX 77536 (North); United States

Information
- Type: Public High School
- Motto: Preparing Today's Students for Tomorrow's Challenges
- Established: 1931
- School district: Deer Park Independent School District
- Principal: Kirk Taylor (South), John Wegman (North)
- Staff: 262.21 (FTE)
- Grades: 9-12
- Student to teacher ratio: 15.50
- Colors: Maroon, Gold, Grey, and White
- Athletics: UIL 6A
- Athletics conference: 24-6A
- Mascot: Roebuck
- Rival: La Porte High School
- Newspaper: The Deer Network
- Yearbook: The Deer
- Information: (832) 668-7200
- Website: DPHS South Campus / DPHS North Campus

Deer Park High School, located in Deer Park, Texas is a high school serving students from grades 9-12 as part of the Deer Park Independent School District. The school consists of 3 separate campuses: Deer Park High School North Campus (Grade 9), Deer Park High School South Campus (Grades 10-12) and Deer Park High School Wolters Campus, an alternative high school.

== Feeder schools ==
The high school is fed by Bonnette Junior High, Deepwater Junior High, Deer Park Junior High, and Fairmont Junior High.

== Faculty ==
Deer Park School District has 842 teachers. Of those teaching in the district, 33% have advanced degrees.

== Notable alumni ==
- Andy Pettitte, Major League baseball
- Donnie Elliott, Major League baseball
- Duane Walker, Major League baseball
- Balor Moore, Major League baseball
- Chelsi Smith, 1995 Miss Universe
- Ron White, comedian
- Thomas Walkup, professional basketball player|
- Zane Gonzalez, professional football kicker for the Washington Commanders
- Jimbo Wallace, bass player for rockabilly band the Reverend Horton Heat

== Rebuild of North Campus ==
The buildings of North Campus had aged over time, and were becoming very run down. Many of the buildings were over 50 years old, the oldest being over 80 years old. Construction began in 2013 and was completed in 2016. Most of the school was torn down and replaced with new, modern buildings. The portions that were kept were renovated. The construction added many new classrooms, and a new fine arts building including a new band hall, choir room, black box theater, orchestra room and dance studio. One of the 3 gyms, built in 1938 (Originally built for the elementary school, it eventually became part of the High School when additions were built.) was renovated into the school's library. New chairs, desks, equipment, and other furnishings were purchased as well.

The Wolters Accelerated High School, which was located in the original high school building, formerly part of the North Campus complex, was moved to the former administration building next door, which was originally Deer Park's first elementary school, built in 1930 and expanded in 1938. It was remodeled before demolition began at North Campus.

== Construction to South Campus ==
During the end of the 2007 school year, Deer Park High School began remodeling the campus to better serve the student population. The construction included the addition of two new gymnasiums, 8 computer labs, a new cafeteria, a culinary arts lab and restaurant, science classrooms, a broadcast journalism studio, a new library and administrative spaces. The construction moved the main entrance to the school from the west side of the campus along Texas Avenue to the North Side of the building, along San Augustine Street.

== Features of the campuses ==
Extracurricular activities are divided up between both North and South Campuses, with various sports and fine arts being centered at either campus. South Campus is home to Clyde Abshire Stadium, DPISD's 10,000-seat football and soccer stadium. The stadium is home to all of DPHS's football teams, as well as boys and girls soccer. South Campus also houses ten tennis courts and four gyms. An extensive weight training room, natatorium, and sports medicine and physical therapy clinic are also housed on campus. North Campus is home to the district's baseball and track stadiums, the softball field, as well as 2 gyms.

Wolters Campus is an advanced high school which all students grades 10-12 can apply to attend. The school allows students to work at their own pace and has a different grading system. Many students attend Wolters to graduate early. Wolters Campus is located in the original San Jacinto Elementary School building, which was built in 1930 and expanded in 1938, and later became the administration building. In 2013, the building was completely renovated to become the new Wolters Campus. Wolters used to be located in the original High School building, which was built in 1949, and was demolished in 2013 when North Campus was being renovated.

In 2008, USA Today cited Deer Park High School in a study about schools being exposed to toxic emissions from factories. The article said that the school's proximity to oil refineries along the Houston Ship Channel threatened its students with high levels of 1,3-Butadiene and other harmful gases. This is especially true for North and Wolters Campuses, as the refineries are located right across Highway 225.

== Fine arts ==
Deer Park High School features band, choir, dance, orchestra, and theatre as parts of its fine arts curriculum. In 2012, its production of The Rimers of Eldritch was a UIL One-Act Play state finalist. Once again in 2014, Deer Park made an appearance at the One-Act Play state finals with The Drowning Girls. In 2014 Deer Park sent multiple choir and band students to All-State. The school's drill team, The Deer Escorts, also compete in numerous competitions throughout the year and have recently been named Best in Show and Grand Champions. Each year, the band performs a marching show, and competes in multiple competitions against other bands, as well as performing at football games, playing songs in the stands and performing their show during halftime. The band begins rehearsing for their show near the end of summer before school begins.

For fine arts, both campuses feature band and choir halls, dance studios, and theatre classrooms. South Campus is home to the Deer Park High School Performing Arts Center (PAC). The PAC houses a 1500-seat proscenium theatre and 120-seat black box theatre. The PAC was built as an addition to the campus in 2001 to provide an additional performance space for the school and to allow for more technically complex shows, that the school's original auditorium could not hold. Annually the PAC is home to multiple UIL competitions for band, choir, and theatre. North Campus is home to Gaines Y. Mason Auditorium, a 1400-seat theatre used for assemblies, award ceremonies, and freshmen choir, theatre, and dance performances.

== Athletics ==
The Deer Park High School Lady Deer softball team is a 3x State Champion (2012, 2014 and 2021) and advanced to the State tournament six times in 2012, 2013, 2014, 2017, 2021 and 2022. In 2022, MaxPreps ranked the Deer Park Lady Deer Softball program as the #3 dynasty high school softball program over the past 10 seasons, after the Lady Deer won their 3rd State Championship in 2021 with a 40-8 record, finishing as the #1 ranked 6A team in Texas and #8 nationally. The following year concluded with another appearance at the State tournament and a 40-5 record, however coming up short of defending their crown as State Champions.

The Deer Park High School Cheerleading Team are 5x NCA National Champions with 4 back to back to back to back titles (2018, 2021, 2022, 2023, 2024, and 2025) and are UIL 6A-D1 Texas State Runner Ups (2024) and UIL 6A-D1 Texas State Finalists (2023 and 2024).

The golf team was a state finalist in 2013 and placed third in the state in 2014. The boys and girls soccer teams were regional finalists in 2012, 2013, and 2014. The baseball team competed at the state level in 2013 and was named state champions in 2017. The school's varsity football team has participated in the state-playoffs each year for the past twenty-one years. Volleyball has competed in the state-playsoffs for the past eight. In 2010, 2011, 2012, and 2014 the school's Tennis teams were named Area Champions. The track and swim teams both sent representatives to state in 2013 and 2014. Bowling, fishing, cross country, track and field, and basketball are also featured as part of the athletic program.

== Other school groups ==
The school features a number of other competitive groups. The journalism department features five classes: yearbook, newspaper, photojournalism, broadcast journalism, and periodical print journalism. The Yearbook, The Deer, was founded in 1947 and has released its volume annually since its inception. In 2013, it was selected by Balfour Publishing, the company that produces the book for the school, as the 2014-2015 National Example book. A copy of the yearbook will be distributed to every high school publishing their yearbook with Balfour in 2015.

The Culinary Arts program at South Campus has competed against other schools in FCCLA Competitions. Deer Park High School has placed first every year in the State Competition since they began participating. In the 2012–2013 school year, they placed second but took first place in Region IV Competition.

The Antler, the school's newspaper, was founded in the 1950s. During the 2016 school year, The Antler: Online, the school's digital news website, was changed to ‘’The Deer Network’’ to mirror the schools broadcast platform. The original site was launched in 2011. Three of its writers were named district champions in 2014.

The broadcast journalism group, The Deer Network, began production in the early 2000s, and has been nominated for numerous Lone Star Education Emmys.

The photojournalism staff serves all of the school's media groups. It has sent many photographers to the state level of competition, including many placers.

German Folk Dancing is competitive school group. It has placed at the state level of competition each year since its inception.
