= Historical rankings of presidents of the United States =

In the 1920s, sculptor Gutzon Borglum and President Calvin Coolidge selected (from left to right) George Washington, Thomas Jefferson, Theodore Roosevelt, and Abraham Lincoln to appear on Mount Rushmore. It later became an iconic symbol of presidential greatness, chosen to represent the nation's birth, growth, development, and preservation, respectively.

In political studies, since the mid 20th-century, surveys have been conducted in order to construct historical rankings of the success of the presidents of the United States. Ranking systems are usually based on surveys of academic historians and political scientists, or popular opinion. The scholarly rankings focus on presidential achievements, leadership qualities, failures, and faults. Among such scholarly rankings, George Washington, Abraham Lincoln, and Franklin D. Roosevelt are most often ranked as the best, while James Buchanan, Andrew Johnson, and Donald Trump are most often ranked as the worst. Popular-opinion polls typically focus on recent or well-known presidents.

== History ==
=== 20th century ===
A 1948 poll was conducted by historian Arthur M. Schlesinger Sr. of Harvard University. A 1962 survey was also conducted by Schlesinger, who surveyed 75 historians. Schlesinger's son, Arthur M. Schlesinger Jr., conducted another poll in 1996. The Chicago Tribune surveyed 49 historians in 1982.

The Siena College Research Institute (SCRI) began conducting surveys in 1982 and continued in 1990, 1994, 2002, 2010, 2018, and 2022 during the second year of the first term of each president since Ronald Reagan. These surveys collect presidential rankings from historians, political scientists, and presidential scholars in a range of attributes, abilities, and accomplishments. The 1994 survey placed only two presidents (Abraham Lincoln and Franklin D. Roosevelt) above 80 points and two presidents (Andrew Johnson and Warren G. Harding) below 50 points.

In 1996, William J. Ridings Jr. and Stuart B. McIver conducted and published a poll and in 1997, an accompanying book on the poll results. 719 people took part in the poll, primarily academic historians and political scientists, although some politicians and celebrities also took part. Participants from every state were included and emphasis was placed upon getting input from female historians and "specialists in African American studies" as well as a few non-American historians. Poll respondents rated the presidents in five categories (leadership qualities, accomplishments, crisis management, political skill, appointments, and character and integrity) and the results were tabulated to create the overall ranking.

=== 2000–2017 ===
A 2005 presidential poll was conducted by James Lindgren for the Federalist Society and The Wall Street Journal. As in the 2000 survey, the editors sought to balance the opinions of liberals and conservatives, adjusting the results "to give Democratic- and Republican-leaning scholars equal weight". Although Franklin D. Roosevelt still ranked in the top three, editor James Taranto observed that Democratic-leaning scholars rated George W. Bush the sixth-worst president of all time while Republican scholars rated him the sixth-best, giving him a split-decision rating of "average". In 2008, The Times daily newspaper of London asked eight of its own "top international and political commentators" to rank all 42 presidents "in order of greatness".

The C-SPAN Survey of Presidential Leadership consists of rankings from a group of presidential historians and biographers. The C-SPAN Survey of Presidential Leadership has taken place four times: in 2000, 2009, 2017, and 2021. The 2021 survey was of 142 presidential historians, surveyed by C-SPAN's Academic Advisor Team, made up of Douglas G. Brinkley, Edna Greene Medford, Richard Norton Smith, and Amity Shlaes. In the survey, each historian rates each president on a scale of one ("not effective") to 10 ("very effective") on presidential leadership in ten categories: Public Persuasion, Crisis Leadership, Economic Management, Moral Authority, International Relations, Administrative Skills, Relations with Congress, Vision/Setting An Agenda, Pursued Equal Justice for All, and Performance Within the Context of His Times—with each category equally weighed. The results of all four C-SPAN surveys have been fairly consistent. Abraham Lincoln has taken the highest ranking in each survey and George Washington, Franklin D. Roosevelt, and Theodore Roosevelt have always ranked in the top five while James Buchanan, Andrew Johnson, and Franklin Pierce have been ranked at the bottom of all four surveys.

The 2011 survey, the first poll asking UK academics to rate American presidents, was conducted by the United States Presidency Centre (USPC) at the Institute for the Study of the Americas (located in the University of London's School of Advanced Study). This polled the opinion of British specialists in American history and politics to assess presidential performance. They also gave an interim assessment of Barack Obama, but his unfinished presidency was not included in the survey (had he been included, he would have attained eighth place overall).

In 2012, Newsweek asked a panel of historians to rank the ten best presidents since 1900. The results showed that historians had ranked Franklin D. Roosevelt, Theodore Roosevelt, Lyndon B. Johnson, Woodrow Wilson, Harry S. Truman, John F. Kennedy, Dwight D. Eisenhower, Bill Clinton, Ronald Reagan, and Barack Obama as the best since that year. A 2015 poll administered by the American Political Science Association (APSA) among political scientists specializing in the American presidency had Abraham Lincoln in the top spot, with Washington, Franklin D. Roosevelt, Theodore Roosevelt, Thomas Jefferson, Truman, Eisenhower, Clinton, Andrew Jackson, and Wilson making the top 10.

=== Since 2018 ===
A second Presidential Greatness Project Expert Survey was sent to members of the Presidents and Executive Politics section of the APSA in 2018. It ranked Donald Trump for the first time, putting him in the last position. In the 2024 edition, Trump scored 10.92 out of 100, easily the worst, while self-identified Republican historians rated Trump in the bottom five. The study organizers observed a drop in recent Republican presidents' scores by speculating that respondents valued presidents that respected political and institutional norms. The first version of this poll was conducted in 2015.

The 2018 Siena poll of 157 presidential scholars reported George Washington, Franklin D. Roosevelt, Abraham Lincoln, Theodore Roosevelt, and Thomas Jefferson as the top five U.S. presidents, with SCRI director Don Levy stating, "The top five, Mount Rushmore plus FDR, is carved in granite with presidential historians." Trump—entering the SCRI survey for the first time—joined Andrew Johnson and James Buchanan among the bottom three U.S. presidents. George W. Bush, whom presidential scholars had rated fifth lowest in the previous 2010 survey, improved in position to 12th lowest. The 2022 Siena poll had Franklin D. Roosevelt first, Lincoln second, and Washington third, with the bottom three as Trump, Buchanan, and Johnson.

The 2021 C-SPAN poll showed a continued recent rehabilitation of Ulysses S. Grant, showed George W. Bush improving, Barack Obama remaining high, and Trump with the fourth lowest ranking. After Trump's election to a non-consecutive second term, C-SPAN postponed its planned 2025 survey, explaining that "with a former president returning to office, conducting the survey now would turn it from historical analysis to punditry."

== Survey summary ==
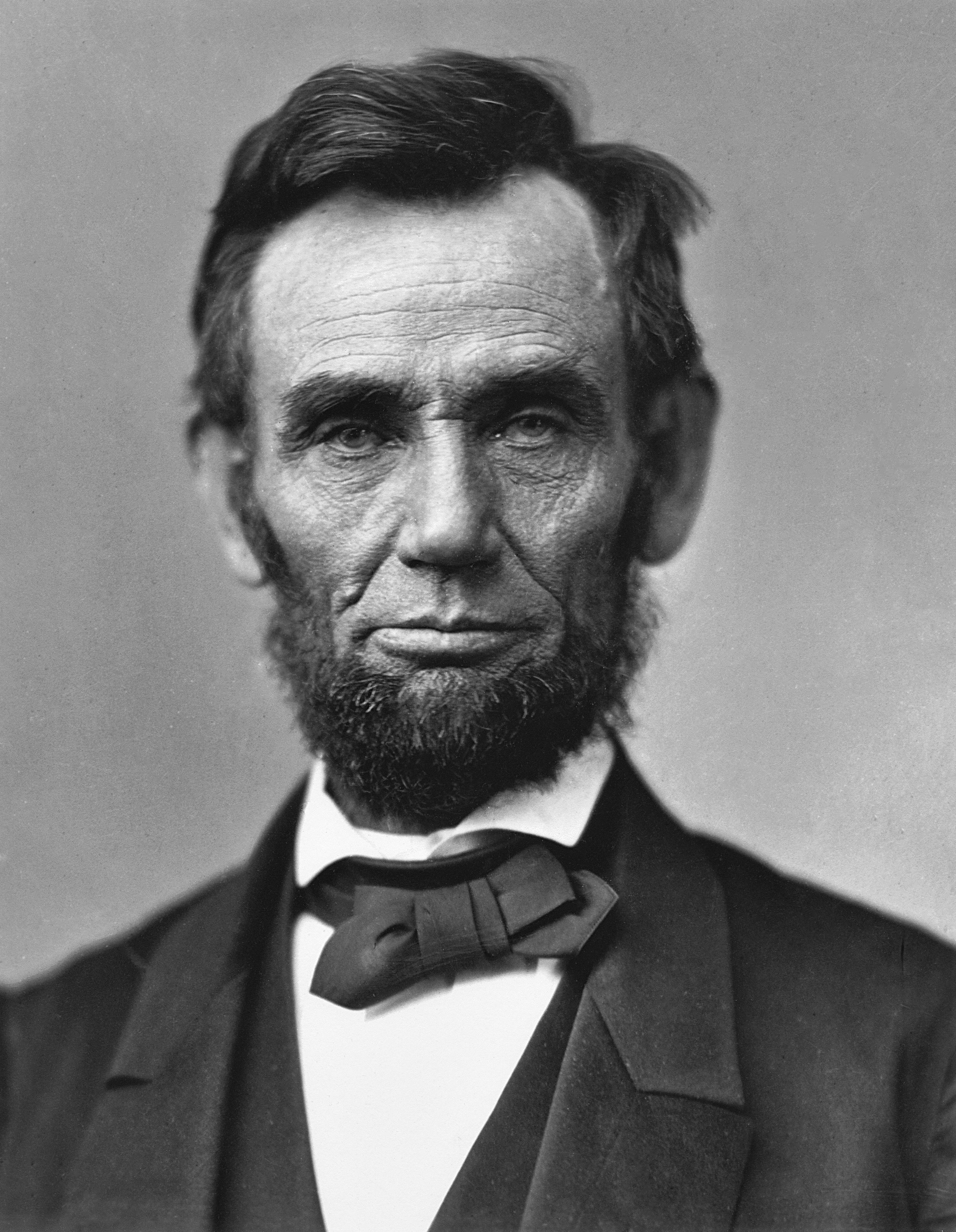
Lincoln

F. D. Roosevelt

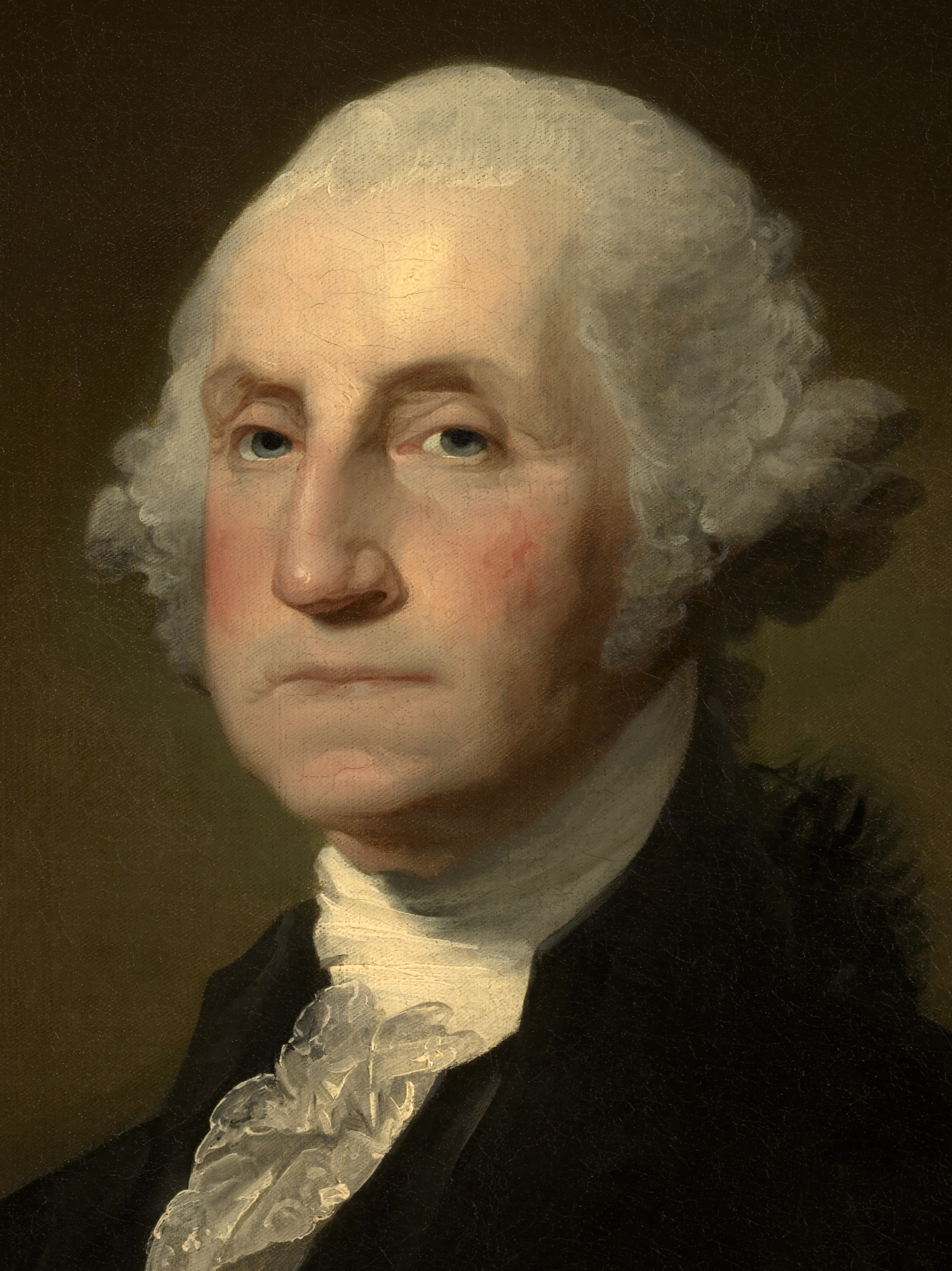
Washington

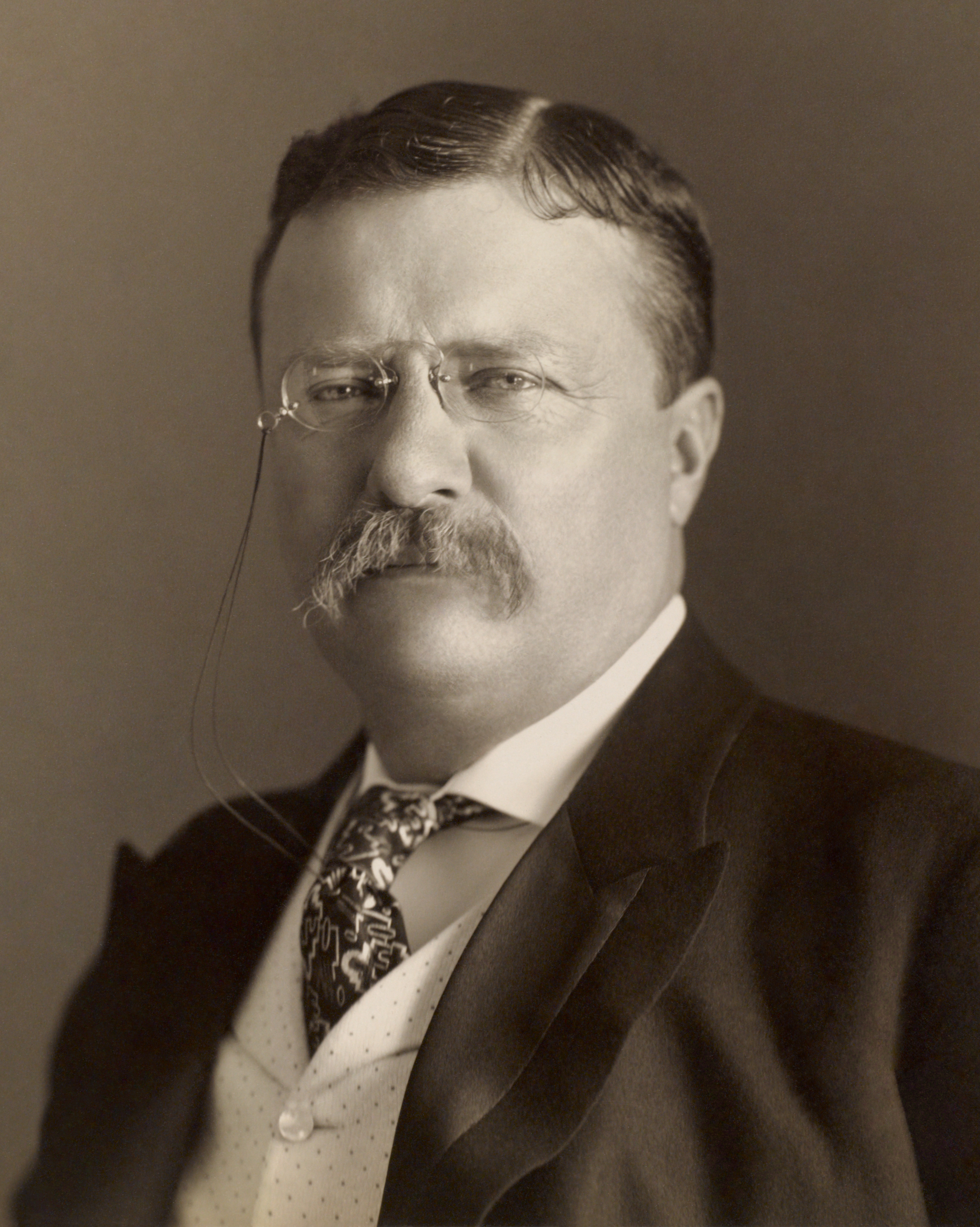
T. Roosevelt

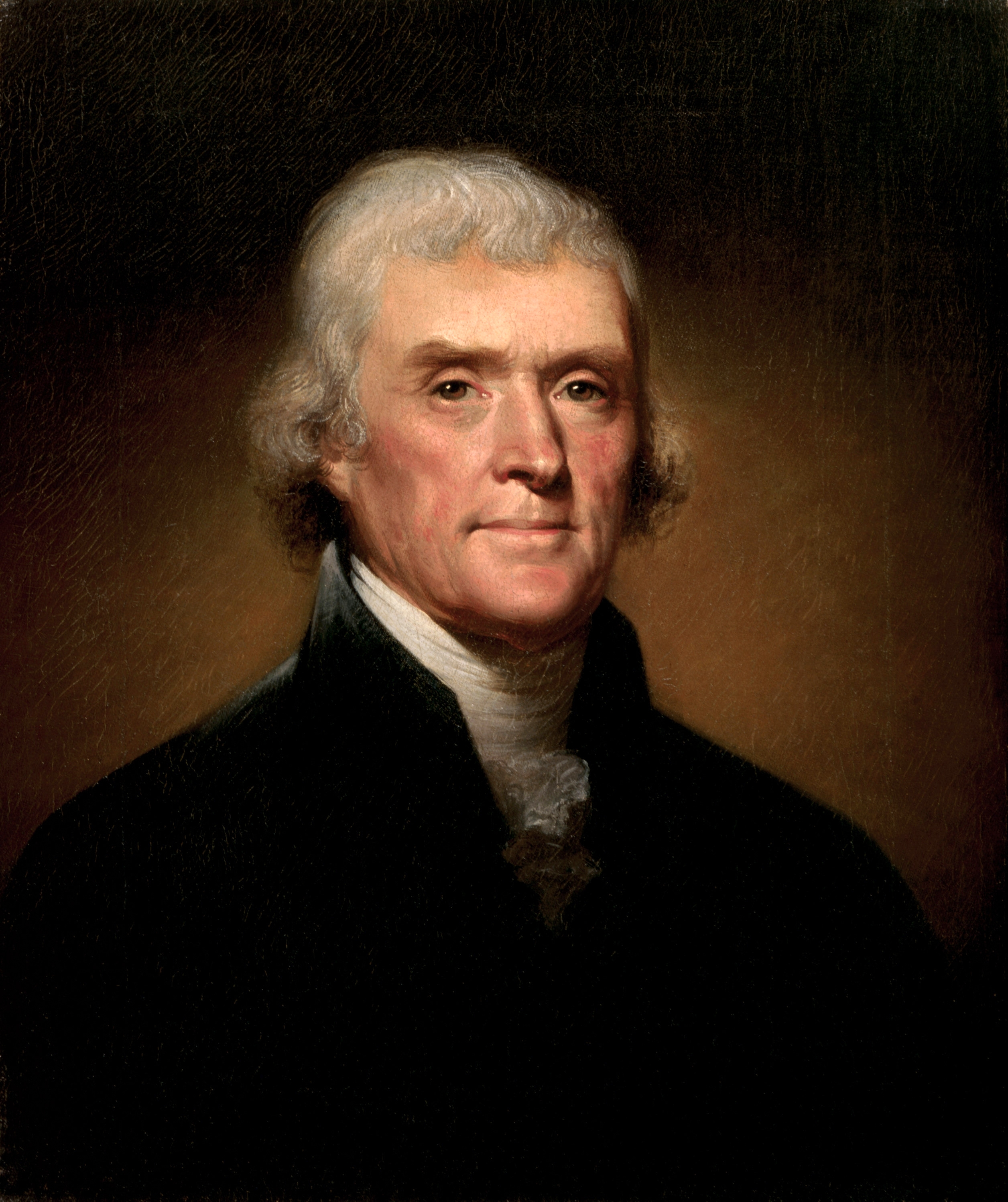
Jefferson

The presidents often composing the top 5 in scholarly surveys.

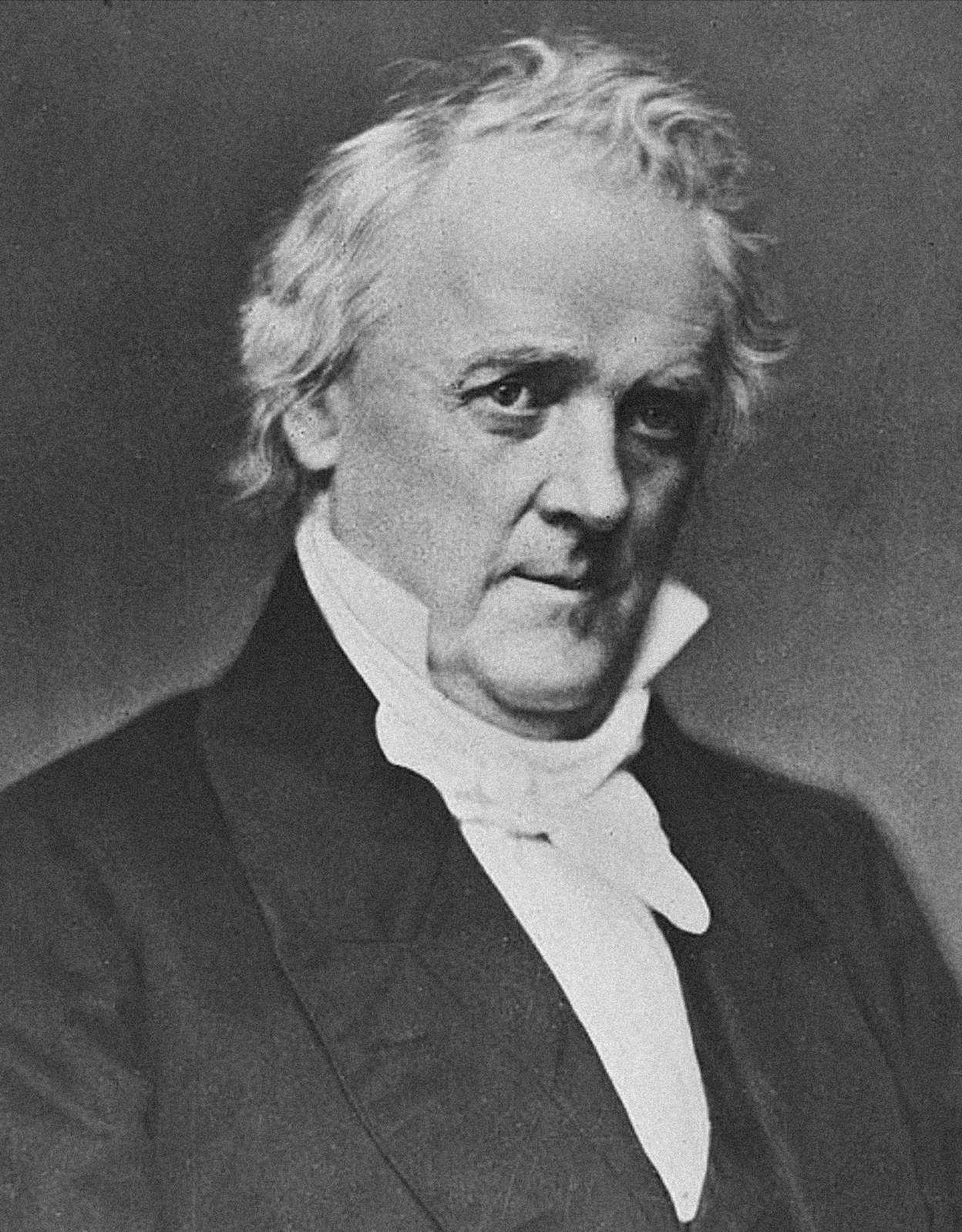
Buchanan

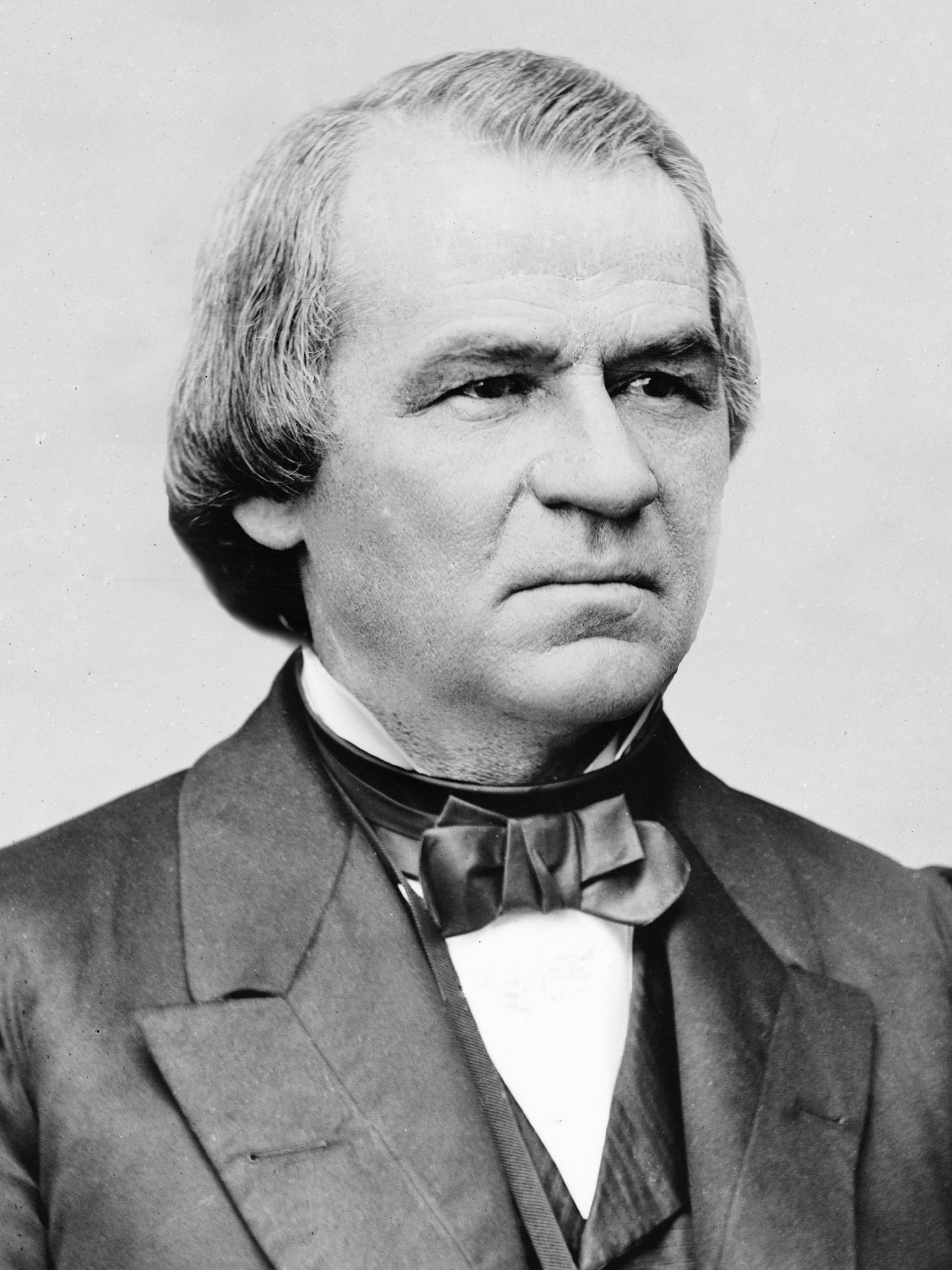
A. Johnson

Trump

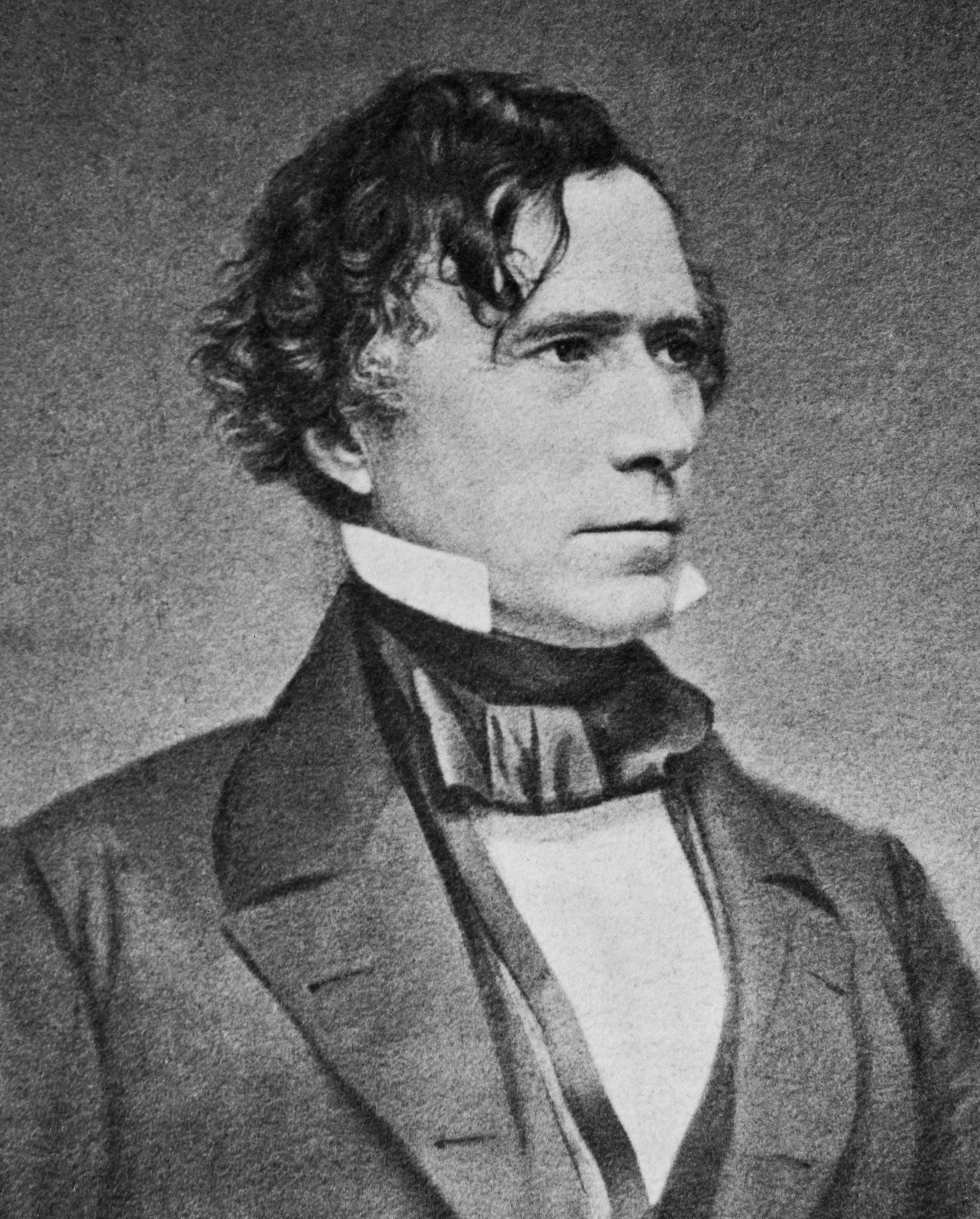
Pierce

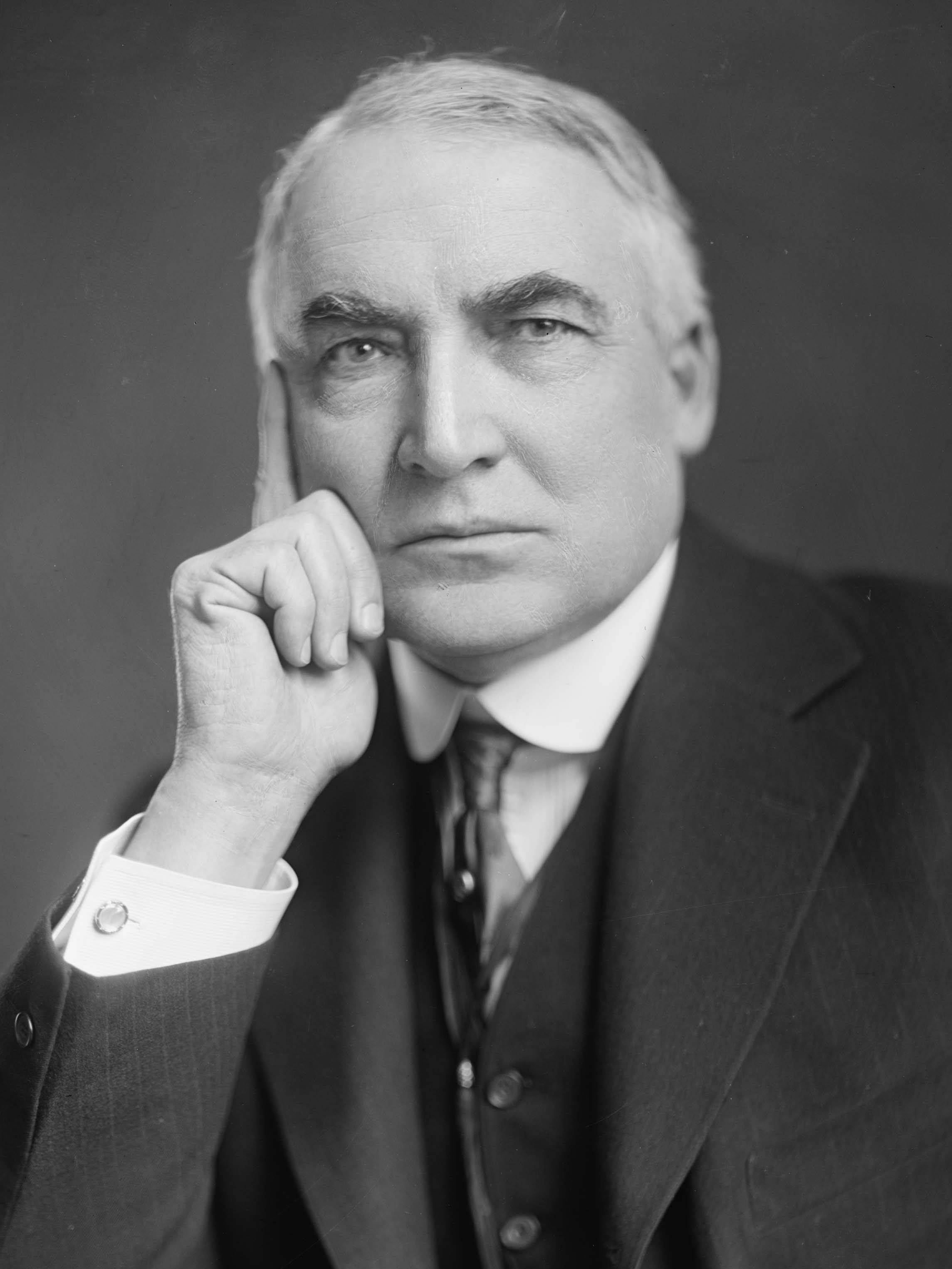
Harding

The presidents often composing the bottom 5 in scholarly surveys.

Abraham Lincoln is often regarded as the greatest president in American history for his leadership during the Civil War and the abolition of slavery. His main competitors are Franklin D. Roosevelt for leading the country out of the Great Depression and during most of World War II, and Founding Father and first president George Washington for holding the newly formed nation together and setting several enduring and important precedents for the office of the president. Theodore Roosevelt has usually ranked in fourth place for his conservation, antitrust and consumer protection efforts, and Thomas Jefferson has typically ranked in fifth for the Louisiana Purchase, his leadership over and support for the Lewis and Clark Expedition, and lowering the U.S. federal debt.

Most surveys consider James Buchanan, Lincoln's predecessor, the worst president for his leadership during the lead-up to the Civil War. Many rank Lincoln's successor, Andrew Johnson, near the bottom for blocking civil rights for freed slaves and undermining Reconstruction. Donald Trump's first presidency has consistently polled among the bottom four and twice in last place due to breaking longstanding norms such as the peaceful transfer of power, an American precedent not broken by a president since Washington first set it. Franklin Pierce has typically ranked in the bottom five for being a benefactor of the South, particularly with his support of the Kansas-Nebraska Act, and most 20th century surveys assigned the bottom rank to the scandal-ridden presidency of Warren G. Harding, which involved the Teapot Dome scandal.

The first five presidents were all Founding Fathers (also known as "framers") and theirs is considered an exceptionally great era of presidents by scholars and political scientists. John Adams, James Monroe and James Madison have consistently been ranked in the top 20, Jefferson typically in the top five, and Washington in the top three. Another presidential era considered exceptionally favorable by experts is the World War II and post-war era of the mid-20th century, with John F. Kennedy and Lyndon B. Johnson consistently ranking in the top 20, Harry S. Truman and Dwight D. Eisenhower in the top ten, and Franklin D. Roosevelt in the top three. An era considered exceptionally poor by presidential historians is the mid-19th century and "sectional crisis" years leading up to the Civil War, with John Tyler, Zachary Taylor and Millard Fillmore typically in the bottom ten, Pierce in the bottom five, and Buchanan in the bottom two. (The exception of that era is James K. Polk.)

Of the modern era, presidents George H. W. Bush, Bill Clinton and Joe Biden have ranked in the top 20, with Ronald Reagan and Barack Obama often in the top ten. (The exceptions of this era are George W. Bush and Donald Trump.)

=== Table ===
Within each column

Blue backgrounds indicate rankings in the first quartile.
Green backgrounds indicate rankings in the second quartile.
Yellow-green backgrounds indicate the median ranking of an odd number of presidents. (Note: Quartiles were determined by splitting the data into an upper and lower half and then splitting these halves each into two quartiles. When splitting an odd total number of rankings, the median is given an intermediate color.)
Yellow backgrounds indicate rankings in the third quartile.
Orange backgrounds indicate rankings in the fourth quartile.
Italics within row indicate rank awarded before president had completed term in office.
Underline within a column indicates a given survey's lowest-ranking president.

At leftmost column head, click "triangles" to view the in-office order of each president.
At each survey column head, click on "triangles" to view the ranking order for each president in that survey.

Seq. (Note: There have been 45 presidents but 47 presidencies, as Grover Cleveland and Donald Trump were elected to two nonconsecutive terms.) (Note: William Henry Harrison and James Garfield are sometimes omitted from rankings of the presidents because of the brevity of their terms in office. In addition to Grover Cleveland's and Donald Trump's two presidential numbers, this contributes to the number of ranks assigned by some sources being less than the presidential complement of the era.)	President	Political party	APSA 2024	Siena 2022	C-SPAN 2021	Siena 2018	APSA 2018	C-SPAN 2017	PHN 2016	APSA 2015	USPC 2011	Siena 2010	C-SPAN 2009	Times 2008	WSJ 2005	Siena 2002	WSJ 2000	C-SPAN 2000	Schl. 1996	R-McI 1996	Siena 1994	Siena 1990	Siena 1982	CT 1982	M-B 1982	Schl. 1962	Schl. 1948
1	George Washington	Independent	3	3	2	1	2	2	3	2	3	4	2	2	1	4	1	3	2 (tie)	3	4	4	4	2	3	2	2
2	John Adams	Federalist	13	16	15	14	14	19	10	15	12	17	17	13	13	12	13	16	11	14	12	14	10	15	9	10	9
3	Thomas Jefferson	Democratic-Republican	5	5	7	5	5	7	5	5	4	5	7	4	4	5	4	7	4	4	5	3	2	5	4	5	5
4	James Madison	Democratic-Republican	11	10	16	7	12	17	15	13	14	6	20	15	17	9	15	18	17	10	9	8	9	17	14	12	14
5	James Monroe	Democratic-Republican	18	12	12	8	18	13	14	16	13	7	14	21	16	8	16	14	15	13	15	11	15	16	15	18	12
6	John Quincy Adams	Democratic-Republican	20	17	17	18	23	21	17	22	20	19	19	16	25	17	20	19	18	18	17	16	17	19	16	13	11
7	Andrew Jackson	Democratic	21	23	22	19	15	18	16	9	9	14	13	14	10	13	6	13	5	8	11	9	13	7	7	6	6
8	Martin Van Buren	Democratic	28	29	34	25	27	34	27	25	27	23	31	40	27	24	23	30	21	21	22	21	21	18	20	17	15
9	William Henry Harrison	Whig	41	40	40	39	42	38	–	39	–	35	39	39	–	36	–	37	–	35	28	35	26	–	–	–	–
10	John Tyler	Whig/ Independent (Note: Tyler was elected on the Whig ticket as Harrison's vice president, and assumed the presidency as a Whig on 4 April 1841. He became an independent after the Whigs expelled him from the party on 13 September 1841.)	37	39	39	37	37	39	36	36	37	37	35	31	35	37	34	36	32	34	34	33	34	28	28	25	22
11	James K. Polk	Democratic	25	15	18	12	20	14	22	19	16	12	12	9	9	11	10	12	9	11	14	13	12	10	12	8 (tie)	10
12	Zachary Taylor	Whig	38	36	35	30	35	31	33	33	33	33	29	28	33	34	31	28	29	29	33	34	29	26	27	24	25
13	Millard Fillmore	Whig	39	38	38	38	38	37	39	37	35	38	37	33	36	38	35	35	31	36	35	32	32	31	29	26	24
14	Franklin Pierce	Democratic	42	41	42	40	41	41	40	40	39	40	40	41	38	39	37 (tie)	39	33 (tie)	37	37	36	35	33	31	28	27
15	James Buchanan	Democratic	44	44	44	43	43	43	41	43	40	42	42	42	40	41	39	41	38	40	39	38	37	34	33	29	26
16	Abraham Lincoln	Republican	1	2	1	3	1	1	2	1	2	3	1	1	2	2	2	1	1	1	2	2	3	1	1	1	1
17	Andrew Johnson	National Union (Note: When he ran for reelection in 1864, Republican Abraham Lincoln formed a bipartisan electoral alliance with War Democrats by selecting Democrat Andrew Johnson as his running mate, and running on the National Union Party ticket. Not until 1868, long after the National Union Party had disbanded, did Johnson rejoin the Democratic Party.)	43	45	43	44	40	42	37	41	36	43	41	24	37	42	36	40	37	39	40	39	38	30	32	23	19
18	Ulysses S. Grant	Republican	17	21	20	24	21	22	23	28	29	26	23	18	29	35	32	33	33 (tie)	38	38	37	36	32	35	30	28
19	Rutherford B. Hayes	Republican	29	31	33	32	29	32	32	30	30	31	33	27	24	27	22	26	23	25	24	23	22	22	22	14	13
20	James A. Garfield	Republican	30	27	27	28	34	29	–	31	–	27	28	34 (tie)	–	33	–	29	–	30	26	30	25	–	–	–	–
21	Chester A. Arthur	Republican	33	33	30	34	31	35	35	32	32	25	32	22	26	30	26	32	26	28	27	26	24	24	23	21 (tie)	17
22/24	Grover Cleveland	Democratic	26	26	25	23	24	23	24	23	21	20	21	19	12	20	12	17	13	16	19	17	18	13	17	11	8
23	Benjamin Harrison	Republican	31	34	32	35	32	30	30	29	34	34	30	29 (tie)	30	32	27	31	19	31	30	29	31	25	26	20	21
25	William McKinley	Republican	24	22	14	20	19	16	20	21	17	21	16	17	14	19	14	15	16	17	18	19	19	11	18	15	18
26	Theodore Roosevelt	Republican	4	4	4	4	4	4	4	4	5	2	4	5	5	3	5	4	6	5	3	5	5	4	5	7	7
27	William Howard Taft	Republican	23	25	23	22	22	24	25	20	25	24	24	29 (tie)	20	21	19	24	22	20	21	20	20	20	19	16	16
28	Woodrow Wilson	Democratic	15	13	13	11	11	11	6	10	6	8	9	10	11	6	11	6	7	6	6	6	6	6	6	4	4
29	Warren G. Harding	Republican	40	42	37	41	39	40	38	42	38	41	38	34 (tie)	39	40	37 (tie)	38	39	41	41	40	39	36	36	31	29
30	Calvin Coolidge	Republican	34	32	24	31	28	27	31	27	28	29	26	26	23	29	25	27	30	33	36	31	30	29	30	27	23
31	Herbert Hoover	Republican	36	37	36	36	36	36	29	38	26	36	34	36	31	31	29	34	33 (tie)	24	29	28	27	21	21	19	20
32	Franklin D. Roosevelt	Democratic	2	1	3	2	3	3	1	3	1	1	3	3	3	1	3	2	2 (tie)	2	1	1	1	3	2	3	3
33	Harry S. Truman	Democratic	6	7	6	9	6	6	8	6	7	9	5	7	7	7	7	5	8	7	7	7	7	8	8	8 (tie)	–
34	Dwight D. Eisenhower	Republican	8	6	5	6	7	5	9	7	10	10	8	6	8	10	9	9	10	9	8	12	11	9	11	21 (tie)	–
35	John F. Kennedy	Democratic	10	9	8	10	16	8	12	14	15	11	6	11	15	14	18	8	12	15	10	10	8	14	13	–	–
36	Lyndon B. Johnson	Democratic	9	8	11	16	10	10	11	12	11	16	11	12	18	15	17	10	14	12	13	15	14	12	10	–	–
37	Richard Nixon	Republican	35	28	31	29	33	28	26	34	23	30	27	37 (tie)	32	26	33	25	36	32	23	25	28	35	34	–	–
38	Gerald Ford	Republican	27	30	28	27	25	25	28	24	24	28	22	25	28	28	28	23	28	27	32	27	23	23	24	–	–
39	Jimmy Carter	Democratic	22	24	26	26	26	26	18	26	18	32	25	32	34	25	30	22	27	19	25	24	33	27	25	–	–
40	Ronald Reagan	Republican	16	18	9	13	9	9	13	11	8	18	10	8	6	16	8	11	25	26	20	22	16	–	–	–	–
41	George H. W. Bush	Republican	19	20	21	21	17	20	21	17	22	22	18	20	21	22	21	20	24	22	31	18	–	–	–	–	–
42	Bill Clinton	Democratic	12	14	19	15	13	15	19	8	19	13	15	23	22	18	24	21	20	23	16	–	–	–	–	–	–
43	George W. Bush	Republican	32	35	29	33	30	33	34	35	31	39	36	37 (tie)	19	23	–	–	–	–	–	–	–	–	–	–	–
44	Barack Obama	Democratic	7	11	10	17	8	12	7	18	(8) (Note: Obama would place 8th based on provisional scores of the USPC 2011 survey, but was not given a ranking in the final results as he had not yet completed his term when the survey was conducted.)	15	–	–	–	–	–	–	–	–	–	–	–	–	–	–	–
45/47	Donald Trump	Republican	45	43	41	42	44	–	–	–	–	–	–	–	–	–	–	–	–	–	–	–	–	–	–	–	–
46	Joe Biden	Democratic	14	19	–	–	–	–	–	–	–	–	–	–	–	–	–	–	–	–	–	–	–	–	–	–	–
Total surveyed			45	45	44	44	44	43	41	43	40	43	42	42	40	42	39	41	39	41	41	40	39	36	36	31	29
Seq.	President	Political party	APSA 2024	Siena 2022	C-SPAN 2021	Siena 2018	APSA 2018	C-SPAN 2017	PHN 2016	APSA 2015	USPC 2011	Siena 2010	C-SPAN 2009	Times 2008	WSJ 2005	Siena 2002	WSJ 2000	C-SPAN 2000	Schl. 1996	R-McI 1996	Siena 1994	Siena 1990	Siena 1982	CT 1982	M-B 1982	Schl. 1962	Schl. 1948

== Scholar surveys ==
=== 1982 Murray–Blessing ===
The Murray–Blessing 1982 survey by Robert K. Murray and Tim H. Blessing asked historians whether they were liberal or conservative on domestic, social, and economic issues. The two groups had only small differences in ranking the best and worst presidents. Both groups agreed on the composition of nine of the top ten presidents (they were split over the inclusion of either Dwight D. Eisenhower or Lyndon B. Johnson) and six of the worst seven (split over Calvin Coolidge or Jimmy Carter).

Rankings by liberals and conservatives
Rank	Liberals (n = 190)	Conservatives (n = 50)
1	Abraham Lincoln	Abraham Lincoln
2	Franklin D. Roosevelt	George Washington
3	George Washington	Franklin D. Roosevelt
4	Thomas Jefferson	Thomas Jefferson
5	Theodore Roosevelt	Theodore Roosevelt
6	Woodrow Wilson	Andrew Jackson
7	Andrew Jackson	Harry S. Truman
8	Harry S. Truman	Woodrow Wilson
9	Lyndon B. Johnson	Dwight D. Eisenhower
10	John Adams	John Adams
...	...	...
30	Calvin Coolidge	Jimmy Carter
31	Franklin Pierce	Richard Nixon
32	James Buchanan	Franklin Pierce
33	Andrew Johnson	Andrew Johnson
34	Ulysses S. Grant	James Buchanan
35	Richard Nixon	Ulysses S. Grant
36	Warren G. Harding	Warren G. Harding

=== 2010 Siena College ===
Abbreviations
Bg = Background
PL = Party leadership
CAb = Communication ability
RC = Relations with Congress
CAp = Court appointments
HE = Handling of economy
L = Luck
AC = Ability to compromise
WR = Willing to take risks
EAp = Executive appointments
OA = Overall ability
Im = Imagination
DA = Domestic accomplishments
Int = Integrity
EAb = Executive ability
FPA = Foreign policy accomplishments
LA = Leadership ability
IQ = Intelligence
AM = Avoiding crucial mistakes
EV = Experts' view
O = Overall
Blue backgrounds indicate first quartile.
Green backgrounds indicate second quartile.
Yellow-green backgrounds indicate the median.
Yellow backgrounds indicate third quartile.
Orange backgrounds indicate fourth quartile.

Seq.	President	Political party	Bg	PL	CAb	RC	CAp	HE	L	AC	WR	EAp	OA	Im	DA	Int	EAb	FPA	LA	IQ	AM	EV	O
1	George Washington	Independent	7	18	12	3	3	4	1	3	4	1	4	9	4	2	2	3	1	12	1	3	4
2	John Adams	Federalist	4	29	18	26	10	13	23	32	16	15	13	17	22	3	19	12	20	7	15	12	17
3	Thomas Jefferson	Democratic-Republican	1	4	6	4	6	16	6	11	8	5	5	3	6	14	5	7	6	1	6	5	5
4	James Madison	Democratic-Republican	3	10	11	9	7	12	17	7	15	9	6	8	12	5	14	20	17	2	10	8	6
5	James Monroe	Democratic-Republican	9	12	15	8	14	9	9	8	17	8	16	16	8	10	11	2	13	15	7	9	7
6	John Quincy Adams	Democratic-Republican	2	34	20	35	16	14	30	29	23	13	15	11	18	4	21	16	26	5	20	21	19
7	Andrew Jackson	Democratic	30	2	10	14	27	28	4	38	5	19	12	13	14	23	6	19	5	23	12	13	14
8	Martin Van Buren	Democratic	16	13	23	19	24	38	33	13	32	25	24	24	27	29	23	25	27	22	27	24	23
9	William Henry Harrison	Whig	24	30	25	31	33	27	42	35	30	24	37	35	36	30	33	39	24	31	33	34	35
10	John Tyler	Independent	33	42	39	42	39	31	22	39	26	34	35	29	34	33	37	35	36	33	32	36	37
11	James K. Polk	Democratic	17	9	13	12	21	15	7	23	7	16	17	14	11	24	9	8	10	20	9	11	12
12	Zachary Taylor	Whig	37	35	28	37	37	24	36	34	28	28	34	27	37	21	31	34	25	37	25	33	33
13	Millard Fillmore	Whig	40	41	40	38	35	33	25	25	37	35	38	36	35	36	38	33	39	39	30	35	38
14	Franklin Pierce	Democratic	38	37	37	41	40	34	35	36	38	38	39	39	39	38	40	40	40	38	35	40	40
15	James Buchanan	Democratic	23	40	41	40	42	41	40	41	43	39	42	42	43	40	42	41	43	40	41	43	42
16	Abraham Lincoln	Republican	28	6	2	6	4	5	13	1	2	2	1	2	1	1	1	5	2	3	2	1	3
17	Andrew Johnson	National Union	42	43	43	43	43	37	39	43	34	42	41	41	42	37	41	38	42	41	42	42	43
18	Ulysses S. Grant	Republican	26	28	24	22	25	29	21	22	22	40	28	26	26	27	34	24	21	29	31	31	26
19	Rutherford B. Hayes	Republican	29	33	30	29	29	26	19	18	33	33	33	32	33	28	30	30	32	30	24	29	31
20	James A. Garfield	Republican	20	22	22	24	32	23	41	27	31	29	25	28	25	25	26	31	23	26	22	27	27
21	Chester A. Arthur	Republican	41	31	32	27	28	19	14	21	27	26	30	25	20	32	27	26	28	32	17	26	25
22/24	Grover Cleveland	Democratic	19	16	17	15	17	22	20	19	24	18	20	22	17	19	17	21	19	25	14	19	20
23	Benjamin Harrison	Republican	39	32	34	28	30	35	29	30	39	36	36	34	32	31	35	28	34	35	23	32	34
25	William McKinley	Republican	21	14	19	11	23	18	24	20	21	20	21	23	19	22	18	15	18	27	11	20	21
26	Theodore Roosevelt	Republican	6	7	3	5	1	2	2	12	1	4	3	1	2	6	4	4	4	6	3	4	2
27	William Howard Taft	Republican	14	36	29	30	18	20	32	24	36	22	23	30	21	18	25	23	31	18	28	23	24
28	Woodrow Wilson	Democratic	8	8	9	16	8	8	15	37	9	10	8	5	9	11	10	10	12	4	29	10	8
29	Warren G. Harding	Republican	43	38	36	34	36	39	37	26	40	43	43	43	40	42	43	37	41	43	39	41	41
30	Calvin Coolidge	Republican	25	24	38	21	26	30	12	28	41	30	32	37	31	17	28	32	33	28	19	28	29
31	Herbert Hoover	Republican	10	26	31	33	19	43	43	40	42	32	26	38	41	13	29	36	37	14	40	38	36
32	Franklin D. Roosevelt	Democratic	5	1	1	2	2	1	5	2	3	3	2	4	3	16	3	1	3	10	4	2	1
33	Harry S. Truman	Democratic	35	15	14	20	15	6	11	15	6	7	7	15	7	8	8	6	9	17	8	6	9
34	Dwight D. Eisenhower	Republican	12	17	21	10	9	11	8	5	20	17	11	20	13	9	7	9	7	19	5	7	10
35	John F. Kennedy	Democratic	13	19	4	13	12	7	27	6	10	6	14	7	15	35	13	17	11	11	16	14	11
36	Lyndon B. Johnson	Democratic	15	3	16	1	5	10	28	9	12	12	9	12	5	34	12	43	15	21	37	16	16
37	Richard Nixon	Republican	18	20	26	36	38	25	34	33	14	37	22	19	24	43	24	11	29	16	43	37	30
38	Gerald Ford	Republican	27	25	35	17	22	36	31	17	35	23	31	33	30	15	32	27	30	34	26	25	28
39	Jimmy Carter	Democratic	31	39	27	39	20	40	38	31	25	21	29	21	29	7	36	29	35	13	36	30	32
40	Ronald Reagan	Republican	34	5	5	7	31	21	3	14	11	31	19	18	23	26	20	13	8	36	13	17	18
41	George H. W. Bush	Republican	11	27	33	23	34	32	26	16	29	27	27	31	28	20	22	14	22	24	18	22	22
42	Bill Clinton	Democratic	22	11	8	25	11	3	10	4	18	11	10	10	10	41	15	18	14	9	34	15	13
43	George W. Bush	Republican	36	23	42	32	41	42	18	42	19	41	40	40	38	39	39	42	38	42	38	39	39
44	Barack Obama	Democratic	32	21	7	18	13	17	16	10	13	14	18	6	16	12	16	22	16	8	21	18	15

=== 2011 USPC ===
In September/October 2010, the United States Presidency Centre (USPC) of the Institute for the Study of the Americas at the University of London surveyed 47 British specialists on American history and politics. Presidents were rated from 1 to 10 in five categories:

1. Vision/agenda-setting: "did the president have the clarity of vision to establish overarching goals for his administration and shape the terms of policy discourse?"
2. Domestic leadership: "did the president display the political skill needed to achieve his domestic objectives and respond effectively to unforeseen developments?"
3. Foreign policy leadership: "was the president an effective leader in promoting US foreign policy interests and national security?"
4. Moral authority: "did the president uphold the moral authority of his office through his character, values, and conduct?"
5. Positive historical significance of legacy: "did the president's legacy have positive benefits for America's development over time?"

William Henry Harrison (1841) and James Garfield (1881) were not rated because they died shortly after taking office. Barack Obama (2009–2017) ranked 8th in interim ranking as of January 2011, but was not counted in the final results (and thus did not affect the rankings of other presidents) because he had yet to complete a term. Franklin D. Roosevelt (1933–1945) came in first overall and in the categories of vision/agenda, domestic leadership, and foreign policy leadership. Washington came in first for moral authority; Lincoln for his legacy. Morgan believes it is likely that Roosevelt's ranking (which only marginally surpassed Lincoln's) rose because the poll was conducted during the worst economic troubles since the 1930s.

Of presidents since 1960, only Ronald Reagan and Barack Obama (in interim results) placed in the top ten; Obama was the highest-ranked president since Harry S. Truman (1945–1953). Most of the other recent presidents held middling positions, although George W. Bush placed in the bottom ten, the lowest-ranked president since Warren G. Harding (1921–1923). Lyndon B. Johnson (1963–1969) would have been placed "much higher in recognition of his civil rights achievement but for the corrosive effect of Vietnam on his foreign policy and moral authority scores". As with U.S. polls, the bottom five (other than Harding) were president before and after the Civil War. One of the more significant differences from American polls is the relatively low ranking of John F. Kennedy (1961–1963), who placed fifteenth. British academics "seemingly faulted JFK for the gap between his rhetoric and his substantive achievements as president."

Abbreviations
VSA = Vision/Setting an agenda
DL = Domestic leadership
FPL = Foreign-policy leadership
MA = Moral authority
HL = Historical legacy (positive significance of)
O = Overall
Blue backgrounds indicate first quartile.
Green backgrounds indicate second quartile.
Yellow backgrounds indicate third quartile.
Orange backgrounds indicate fourth quartile.

Each category is ranked according to its averaged numerical score (in parentheses). Source:

Seq.	President	Political party	VSA	DL	FPL	MA	HL	O
1	George Washington	Independent	5 (8.22)	4 (7.78)	2 (7.89)	1 (9.20)	3 (9.18)	3 (84.5%)
2	John Adams	Federalist	13 (6.33)	17 (5.56)	11 (7.05)	9 (7.15)	12 (6.26)	12 (64.7%)
3	Thomas Jefferson	Democratic-Republican	3 (8.29)	6 (7.57)	8 (7.14)	8 (7.16)	4 (8.16)	4 (76.6%)
4	James Madison	Democratic-Republican	15 (6.23)	15 (5.78)	19 (5.75)	11 (6.72)	10 (6.38)	14 (61.7%)
5	James Monroe	Democratic-Republican	18 (5.97)	18 (5.55)	9 (7.08)	12 (6.27)	14 (6.18)	13 (62.1%)
6	John Quincy Adams	Democratic-Republican	17 (6.00)	21 (4.89)	20 (5.69)	13 (6.00)	19 (5.22)	20 (55.6%)
7	Andrew Jackson	Democratic	9 (7.50)	7 (7.29)	18 (6.08)	18 (5.63)	9 (6.40)	9 (65.8%)
8	Martin Van Buren	Democratic	27 (4.33)	25 (4.42)	27 (4.55)	27 (4.45)	25 (4.06)	27 (43.6%)
9	William H. Harrison	Whig	–	–	–	–	–	–
10	John Tyler	Independent	37 (3.38)	37 (3.08)	30 (4.00)	35 (3.19)	38 (2.46)	37 (32.2%)
11	James K. Polk	Democratic	12 (6.44)	13 (5.97)	14 (6.50)	22 (5.19)	20 (5.22)	16 (58.6%)
12	Zachary Taylor	Whig	33 (3.84)	33 (3.88)	28 (4.13)	26 (4.46)	34 (3.00)	33 (38.6%)
13	Millard Fillmore	Whig	36 (3.50)	35 (3.62)	35 (3.72)	32 (3.72)	32 (3.19)	35 (35.5%)
14	Franklin Pierce	Democratic	40 (2.79)	39 (2.50)	39 (3.00)	37 (2.81)	39 (2.18)	39 (26.5%)
15	James Buchanan	Democratic	39 (3.06)	40 (2.33)	40 (2.91)	38 (2.74)	40 (2.11)	40 (26.3%)
16	Abraham Lincoln	Republican	2 (8.98)	2 (8.91)	3 (7.73)	2 (9.13)	1 (9.37)	2 (88.2%)
17	Andrew Johnson	National Union	26 (4.39)	38 (2.90)	31 (3.92)	36 (3.05)	36 (2.54)	36 (33.6%)
18	Ulysses S. Grant	Republican	30 (4.05)	30 (4.08)	26 (4.64)	31 (3.95)	26 (3.95)	29 (41.3%)
19	Rutherford B. Hayes	Republican	28 (4.27)	26 (4.27)	33 (3.81)	30 (4.10)	31 (3.48)	30 (39.8%)
20	James A. Garfield	Republican	–	–	–	–	–	–
21	Chester A. Arthur	Republican	34 (3.74)	29 (4.22)	36 (3.68)	28 (4.26)	30 (3.48)	32 (38.8%)
22/24	Grover Cleveland	Democratic	23 (5.44)	19 (5.28)	22 (5.16)	19 (5.56)	21 (5.06)	21 (53.0%)
23	Benjamin Harrison	Republican	35 (3.68)	34 (3.68)	34 (3.75)	29 (4.24)	33 (3.04)	34 (36.8%)
25	William McKinley	Republican	19 (5.95)	16 (5.58)	17 (6.28)	17 (5.86)	17 (5.46)	17 (58.3%)
26	Theodore Roosevelt	Republican	7 (8.11)	5 (7.76)	5 (7.61)	10 (7.09)	7 (7.28)	5 (75.7%)
27	William Howard Taft	Republican	25 (4.61)	24 (4.59)	24 (4.73)	25 (4.97)	23 (4.18)	25 (46.1%)
28	Woodrow Wilson	Democratic	8 (8.11)	8 (6.98)	6 (7.50)	5 (7.30)	5 (7.43)	6 (75.7%)
29	Warren G. Harding	Republican	38 (3.32)	36 (3.23)	37 (3.62)	39 (2.21)	37 (2.52)	38 (29.8%)
30	Calvin Coolidge	Republican	29 (4.22)	31 (4.07)	29 (4.02)	23 (5.07)	29 (3.56)	28 (41.9%)
31	Herbert Hoover	Republican	24 (4.87)	32 (4.02)	25 (4.72)	24 (5.00)	28 (3.78)	26 (44.8%)
32	Franklin D. Roosevelt	Democratic	1 (9.11)	1 (9.04)	1 (8.77)	3 (8.43)	2 (9.32)	1 (89.3%)
33	Harry S. Truman	Democratic	10 (7.06)	9 (6.79)	4 (7.72)	7 (7.28)	6 (7.32)	7 (72.3%)
34	Dwight D. Eisenhower	Republican	20 (5.81)	12 (6.13)	7 (7.21)	4 (7.40)	11 (6.34)	10 (65.8%)
35	John F. Kennedy	Democratic	11 (6.96)	14 (5.79)	15 (6.41)	21 (5.42)	13 (6.23)	15 (61.6%)
36	Lyndon B. Johnson	Democratic	4 (8.23)	3 (8.55)	32 (3.87)	20 (5.45)	8 (6.53)	11 (65.3%)
37	Richard Nixon	Republican	16 (6.11)	20 (5.09)	12 (6.83)	40 (2.02)	27 (3.89)	23 (47.9%)
38	Gerald Ford	Republican	32 (3.93)	22 (4.72)	23 (4.89)	16 (5.87)	24 (4.11)	24 (47.0%)
39	Jimmy Carter	Democratic	22 (5.60)	23 (4.72)	21 (5.62)	6 (7.28)	18 (5.38)	18 (57.2%)
40	Ronald Reagan	Republican	6 (8.17)	11 (6.28)	10 (7.06)	14 (5.89)	15 (5.89)	8 (66.6%)
41	George H. W. Bush	Republican	31 (4.04)	27 (4.24)	13 (6.64)	15 (5.87)	22 (4.71)	22 (51.0%)
42	Bill Clinton	Democratic	14 (6.28)	10 (6.46)	16 (6.39)	34 (3.48)	16 (5.57)	19 (56.4%)
43	George W. Bush	Republican	21 (5.64)	28 (4.22)	38 (3.82)	33 (3.55)	35 (2.75)	31 (39.6%)
44	Barack Obama	Democratic	11 (7.00)	11 (6.44)	19 (6.04)	8 (7.27)	8 (6.66)	8 (66.8%)

=== 2016 PHN ===
In 2016, the Presidential History Network surveyed 71 named British and Irish specialists. The questions were the same as in the USPC survey, which was directed by some of the same people. Some respondents did not rate presidents that they were not familiar with. The minimum number of responses (62) were for the rather obscure and inconsequential presidents Rutherford B. Hayes, Chester A. Arthur, Grover Cleveland, and Benjamin Harrison. 69–70 rated all recent presidents, from Franklin D. Roosevelt on.

Abbreviations
VSA = Vision/Setting an agenda
DL = Domestic leadership
FPL = Foreign-policy leadership
MA = Moral authority
HL = Historical legacy (positive significance of)
O = Overall
Blue backgrounds indicate first quartile.
Green backgrounds indicate second quartile.
Yellow-green backgrounds indicate the median.
Yellow backgrounds indicate third quartile.
Orange backgrounds indicate fourth quartile.

Each category is ranked according to its averaged numerical score. Source:

Seq.	President	Political party	VSA	DL	FPL	MA	HL	O
1	George Washington	Independent	3 (8.46)	4 (7.65)	3 (7.69)	2 (8.90)	3 (8.94)	3 (8.33)
2	John Adams	Federalist	18 (6.27)	14 (5.98)	11 (6.79)	11 (6.79)	10 (6.47)	10 (6.52)
3	Thomas Jefferson	Democratic-Republican	4 (8.38)	6 (7.20)	9 (6.83)	10 (6.82)	4 (7.65)	5 (7.38)
4	James Madison	Democratic-Republican	15 (6.36)	13 (6.08)	20 (5.79)	12 (6.47)	13 (6.36)	15 (6.21)
5	James Monroe	Democratic-Republican	14 (6.40)	16 (5.80)	8 (7.02)	14 (6.16)	14 (6.20)	14 (6.32)
6	John Quincy Adams	Democratic-Republican	20 (6.17)	19 (5.41)	17 (6.09)	13 (6.44)	15 (6.06)	17 (6.03)
7	Andrew Jackson	Democratic	11 (7.24)	8 (6.73)	21 (5.67)	22 (5.00)	17 (5.63)	16 (6.05)
8	Martin Van Buren	Democratic	29 (4.57)	25 (4.76)	26 (4.58)	25 (4.46)	26 (4.11)	27 (4.50)
9	William H. Harrison (Note: Harrison was only president for one month, therefore, he was not ranked in this survey.)	Whig	–	–	–	–	–	–
10	John Tyler	Independent	36 (3.52)	36 (3.36)	33 (3.57)	32 (3.42)	35 (3.12)	36 (3.39)
11	James K. Polk	Democratic	17 (6.30)	19 (5.41)	18 (6.06)	26 (4.36)	23 (4.75)	22 (5.38)
12	Zachary Taylor	Whig	34 (3.66)	35 (3.61)	34 (3.51)	30 (4.12)	33 (3.29)	33 (3.64)
13	Millard Fillmore	Whig	40 (2.80)	38 (3.10)	38 (3.00)	36 (2.86)	36 (2.78)	39 (2.91)
14	Franklin Pierce	Democratic	39 (2.84)	40 (2.58)	40 (2.92)	37 (2.74)	40 (2.26)	40 (2.67)
15	James Buchanan	Democratic	41 (2.69)	41 (2.31)	41 (2.82)	40 (2.33)	41 (2.13)	41 (2.46)
16	Abraham Lincoln	Republican	2 (9.16)	1 (9.03)	2 (8.01)	1 (9.32)	1 (9.49)	2 (9.00)
17	Andrew Johnson	National Union	35 (3.54)	39 (2.95)	37 (3.41)	38 (2.73)	38 (2.56)	37 (3.04)
18	Ulysses S. Grant	Republican	24 (5.30)	22 (5.17)	23 (5.44)	21 (5.05)	22 (5.00)	23 (5.19)
19	Rutherford B. Hayes	Republican	33 (3.83)	31 (3.92)	32 (3.70)	31 (3.67)	32 (3.44)	32 (3.71)
20	James A. Garfield (Note: Garfield was president for 6 and a half months, therefore, he was not ranked in this survey.)	Republican	–	–	–	–	–	–
21	Chester A. Arthur	Republican	37 (3.36)	33 (3.78)	35 (3.49)	33 (3.38)	34 (3.18)	35 (3.44)
22/24	Grover Cleveland	Democratic	23 (5.33)	24 (4.93)	24 (5.15)	20 (5.22)	24 (4.73)	24 (5.07)
23	Benjamin Harrison	Republican	30 (4.06)	29 (4.10)	29 (4.10)	29 (4.13)	29 (3.55)	30 (3.99)
25	William McKinley	Republican	22 (5.84)	18 (5.65)	16 (6.13)	18 (5.42)	21 (5.24)	20 (5.66)
26	Theodore Roosevelt	Republican	8 (8.07)	5 (7.55)	4 (7.62)	7 (7.03)	6 (7.07)	4 (7.47)
27	William Howard Taft	Republican	28 (4.63)	27 (4.63)	25 (4.76)	24 (4.84)	25 (4.34)	25 (4.64)
28	Woodrow Wilson	Democratic	5 (8.37)	11 (6.26)	5 (7.53)	8 (7.00)	8 (7.01)	6 (7.23)
29	Warren G. Harding	Republican	38 (3.22)	37 (3.17)	36 (3.48)	39 (2.37)	39 (2.54)	38 (2.96)
30	Calvin Coolidge	Republican	31 (3.90)	30 (4.00)	31 (3.83)	28 (4.29)	31 (3.48)	31 (3.90)
31	Herbert Hoover	Republican	27 (4.72)	34 (3.76)	28 (4.15)	27 (4.31)	30 (3.48)	29 (4.08)
32	Franklin D. Roosevelt	Democratic	1 (9.31)	2 (9.00)	1 (9.11)	3 (8.40)	2 (9.23)	1 (9.01)
33	Harry S. Truman	Democratic	12 (6.90)	9 (6.71)	5 (7.53)	9 (6.86)	7 (7.03)	8 (7.06)
34	Dwight D. Eisenhower	Republican	19 (6.22)	12 (6.09)	7 (7.13)	5 (7.30)	11 (6.44)	9 (6.64)
35	John F. Kennedy	Democratic	9 (7.56)	17 (5.77)	13 (6.60)	16 (5.67)	12 (6.43)	12 (6.41)
36	Lyndon B. Johnson	Democratic	7 (8.16)	3 (8.46)	30 (4.06)	19 (5.23)	9 (6.59)	11 (6.50)
37	Richard Nixon	Republican	21 (6.16)	21 (5.19)	19 (5.99)	41 (1.75)	28 (3.58)	26 (4.53)
38	Gerald Ford	Republican	32 (3.85)	28 (4.38)	27 (4.46)	23 (4.94)	27 (4.06)	28 (4.34)
39	Jimmy Carter	Democratic	16 (6.31)	23 (4.99)	22 (5.53)	6 (7.14)	18 (5.59)	18 (5.91)
40	Ronald Reagan	Republican	6 (8.19)	15 (5.86)	12 (6.72)	17 (5.64)	19 (5.51)	13 (6.38)
41	George H. W. Bush	Republican	26 (4.83)	26 (4.67)	10 (6.81)	15 (5.68)	20 (5.41)	21 (5.48)
42	Bill Clinton	Democratic	13 (6.88)	7 (6.93)	14 (6.35)	34 (3.22)	16 (5.85)	19 (5.85)
43	George W. Bush	Republican	25 (4.93)	32 (3.83)	39 (2.94)	35 (2.91)	37 (2.60)	34 (3.44)
44	Barack Obama	Democratic	10 (7.39)	9 (6.71)	15 (6.30)	4 (7.86)	5 (7.44)	7 (7.14)

=== 2017 C-SPAN ===
Abbreviations
PP = Public persuasion
CL = Crisis leadership
EM = Economic management
MA = Moral authority
IR = International relations
AS = Administrative skills
RC = Relations with Congress
VSA = Vision/Setting an agenda
PEJ = Pursued equal justice for all
PCT = Performance within context of times
O = Overall
Blue backgrounds indicate first quartile.
Green backgrounds indicate second quartile.
Yellow-green backgrounds indicate the median.
Yellow backgrounds indicate third quartile.
Orange backgrounds indicate fourth quartile.

Seq.	President	Political party	PP	CL	EM	MA	IR	AS	RC	VSA	PEJ	PCT	O
1	George Washington	Independent	4	2	1	1	2	2	2	2	13	1	2
2	John Adams	Federalist	22	17	15	11	13	21	24	20	15	19	19
3	Thomas Jefferson	Democratic-Republican	8	13	13	6	11	7	5	5	17	6	7
4	James Madison	Democratic-Republican	18	19	19	9	22	17	13	18	18	16	17
5	James Monroe	Democratic-Republican	17	14	18	16	7	11	9	14	25	11	13
6	John Quincy Adams	Democratic-Republican	33	23	17	12	15	18	32	15	9	22	21
7	Andrew Jackson	Democratic	7	10	26	20	20	23	21	10	38	13	18
8	Martin Van Buren	Democratic	30	35	40	33	26	26	28	33	30	33	34
9	William Henry Harrison	Whig	28	38	38	31	42	40	38	36	37	38	38
10	John Tyler	Independent	39	36	39	37	28	38	41	37	41	36	39
11	James K. Polk	Democratic	13	9	14	27	16	9	11	11	36	12	14
12	Zachary Taylor	Whig	27	28	28	28	30	35	35	30	34	30	31
13	Millard Fillmore	Whig	40	34	34	36	34	36	36	39	39	37	37
14	Franklin Pierce	Democratic	41	41	41	39	40	39	40	41	42	41	41
15	James Buchanan	Democratic	43	43	42	43	43	41	42	43	43	43	43
16	Abraham Lincoln	Republican	3	1	2	2	3	1	4	1	1	2	1
17	Andrew Johnson	National Union	42	42	37	41	39	43	43	42	40	42	42
18	Ulysses S. Grant	Republican	19	21	27	19	19	37	20	23	10	21	22
19	Rutherford B. Hayes	Republican	29	30	25	32	33	29	30	32	32	28	32
20	James A. Garfield	Republican	21	31	29	22	36	32	27	25	20	27	29
21	Chester A. Arthur	Republican	37	32	31	35	35	28	29	34	27	32	35
22/24	Grover Cleveland	Democratic	20	22	24	26	23	22	22	21	31	23	23
23	Benjamin Harrison	Republican	32	33	32	30	27	30	26	31	24	31	30
25	William McKinley	Republican	16	16	11	18	17	13	10	17	26	18	16
26	Theodore Roosevelt	Republican	2	5	4	5	4	4	7	4	11	4	4
27	William Howard Taft	Republican	31	26	20	25	21	12	23	28	22	24	24
28	Woodrow Wilson	Democratic	11	11	9	8	12	8	16	7	35	10	11
29	Warren G. Harding	Republican	36	39	35	40	37	42	34	40	33	40	40
30	Calvin Coolidge	Republican	24	29	22	21	29	25	18	29	29	26	27
31	Herbert Hoover	Republican	38	40	43	29	31	14	31	38	28	39	36
32	Franklin D. Roosevelt	Democratic	1	3	5	3	1	3	3	3	8	3	3
33	Harry S. Truman	Democratic	14	4	10	10	5	10	14	13	4	5	6
34	Dwight D. Eisenhower	Republican	12	6	6	4	6	5	6	16	12	7	5
35	John F. Kennedy	Democratic	6	7	7	15	14	16	12	9	7	9	8
36	Lyndon B. Johnson	Democratic	15	20	12	24	38	6	1	8	2	14	10
37	Richard Nixon	Republican	26	27	23	42	10	24	37	24	21	34	28
38	Gerald Ford	Republican	34	24	30	23	25	27	19	35	14	25	25
39	Jimmy Carter	Democratic	35	37	33	14	32	31	33	22	5	29	26
40	Ronald Reagan	Republican	5	8	16	13	9	33	8	6	23	8	9
41	George H. W. Bush	Republican	23	12	21	17	8	16	15	27	16	20	20
42	Bill Clinton	Democratic	9	18	3	38	18	20	17	19	6	17	15
43	George W. Bush	Republican	25	25	36	34	41	34	25	26	19	35	33
44	Barack Obama	Democratic	10	15	8	7	24	19	39	12	3	15	12

=== 2018 Siena College ===
On February 13, 2019, Siena released its sixth presidential poll. The poll was initiated in 1982 and occurs one year into the term of each new president. It is currently a survey of 157 presidential scholars across a range of leadership parameters. The ranking awarded the top five spots to George Washington, Franklin Roosevelt, Abraham Lincoln, Theodore Roosevelt, and Thomas Jefferson, in keeping with prior surveys. Washington had been ranked fourth in all previous surveys, and Franklin Roosevelt first.

Note

- The numbers below do not match the source where there are ties in the rankings. They have instead been counted as ties are in other polls (e.g. 26, 27, 27, 27, 30 rather than 26, 27, 27, 27, 28), so that all categories span the range 1–44.

Abbreviations
Bg = Background
Im = Imagination
Int = Integrity
IQ = Intelligence
L = Luck
WR = Willing to take risks
AC = Ability to compromise
EAb = Executive ability
LA = Leadership ability
CAb = Communication ability
OA = Overall ability
PL = Party leadership
RC = Relations with Congress
CAp = Court appointments
HE = Handling of economy
EAp = Executive appointments
DA = Domestic accomplishments
FPA = Foreign policy accomplishments
AM = Avoiding crucial mistakes
EV = Experts' view
O = Overall
Blue backgrounds indicate first quartile.
Green backgrounds indicate second quartile.
Yellow backgrounds indicate third quartile.
Orange backgrounds indicate fourth quartile.

Seq.	President	Political party	Bg	Im	Int	IQ	L	WR	AC	EAb	LA	CAb	OA	PL	RC	CAp	HE	EAp	DA	FPA	AM	EV	O
1	George Washington	Independent	7	7	1	10	1	6	2	2	1	11	2	18	1	1	1	1	2	2	1	2	1
2	John Adams	Federalist	3	14	4	4	24	14	32	21	21	13	8	28	17	4	13	15	19	13	16	10	14
3	Thomas Jefferson	Democratic-Republican	2	2	14	1	8	5	14	6	6	4	4	5	5	7	20	4	6	9	7	5	5
4	James Madison	Democratic-Republican	4	6	7	3	16	15	6	13	17	10	6	9	10	6	14	7	11	19	11	8	7
5	James Monroe	Democratic-Republican	9	15	11	18	6	16	7	10	12	15	17	12	8	11	9	9	10	5	6	9	8
6	John Quincy Adams	Democratic-Republican	1	9	6	5	29	19	25	22	23	12	16	29	29	15	17	18	21	15	14	18	18
7	Andrew Jackson	Democratic	38	16	29	28	4	4	39	11	9	18	19	6	16	30	25	25	17	23	20	19	19
8	Martin Van Buren	Democratic	24	23	27	25	34	30	20	28	27	25	27	16	23	25	31	26	29	27	24	28	25
9	William Henry Harrison	Whig	22 (tie)	39	28	37	44	34	42	39	29	31	37	36	38	42	41	40	42	44	37	39	39
10	John Tyler	Independent	35	34	35	34	22	26	38	37	37	34	36	41	41	38	34	36	36	26	32	36	37
11	James K. Polk	Democratic	19	10	23	23	9	7	18	7	11	16	12	10	11	22	15	16	12	8	8	13	12
12	Zachary Taylor	Whig	31	27	22	32	37	24	27	26	25	32	32	35	32	37	27	33	27	30	26	30	30
13	Millard Fillmore	Whig	41	38	36	38	35	40 (tie)	33	38	39	40	39	40	40	39	37	37	37	37	33	37	38
14	Franklin Pierce	Democratic	39	40	38	40	39	40 (tie)	40	40	40	41	40	39	39	41	40	39	41	39	38	40	40
15	James Buchanan	Democratic	37	44	40	39	42	44	41	43	44	42	43	42	42	43	42	43	44	43	44	44	43
16	Abraham Lincoln	Republican	29	1	2	2	18	1	1	1	2	1	1	2	4	3	4	2	1	6	2	1	3
17	Andrew Johnson	Democratic	43	43	41	42	40	36	44	44	43	44	42	44	44	44	43	42	43	41	43	43	44
18	Ulysses S. Grant	Republican	20	25	25	24	26	18	17	27	18	26	26	24	19	24	26	38	24	24	31	24	24
19	Rutherford B. Hayes	Republican	36	31	32	29	23	37	24	34	33	30	31	33	30	27	22	30	35	31	28	29	32
20	James A. Garfield	Republican	22 (tie)	26	21	20	41	32	26	25	24	23	24	27	26	34	29	27	34	34	27	25	28
21	Chester A. Arthur	Republican	42	32	37	36	17	35	22 (tie)	30	34	36	35	34	33 (tie)	33	30	31	25	32	23	31	34
22/24	Grover Cleveland	Democratic	27	24	26	27	19	27 (tie)	22 (tie)	19	20	19	22	20	27	20	21	23	23	21	15	22	23
23	Benjamin Harrison	Republican	34	35	30	35	28	38	34	36	35	35	34	31	28	35	32	34	32	29	29	33	35
25	William McKinley	Republican	30	21	20	26	32	22	21	17	19	22	20	11	12	23	16	17	20	14	13	20	20
26	Theodore Roosevelt	Republican	5	4	8	6	2	2	15	4	4	5	5	7	7	9	3	5	4	3	5	4	4
27	William Howard Taft	Republican	12	29	12	14	27	33	19	23	26	21	23	30	21	16	19	21	18	22	19	23	22
28	Woodrow Wilson	Democratic	8	8	19	7	14	11	36	14	14	7	14	8	14	13	11	14	14	11	25	15	11
29	Warren G. Harding	Republican	40	42	42	43	33	43	35	41	41	39	41	38	36	36	35	41	38	36	39	41	41
30	Calvin Coolidge	Republican	33	37	17	33	13	42	28	32 (tie)	38	37	33	26	24	31	24	32	33	35	22	32	31
31	Herbert Hoover	Republican	13	36	15	13	43	39	37	29	36	29	29	32	33 (tie)	26	44	35	39	33	40	35	36
32	Franklin D. Roosevelt	Democratic	6	3	16	12	5	3	4	3	3	2	3	1	3	2	2	3	3	1	4	3	2
33	Harry S. Truman	Democratic	32	17	9	21	12	8	12	8	10	14	10	14	15	17	8	10	7	4	9	7	9
34	Dwight D. Eisenhower	Republican	11	19	5	17	7	21	5	5	5	20	7	15	9	5	6	11	8	7	3	6	6
35	John F. Kennedy	Democratic	14	5	31	11	31	9	8	12	8	3	11	17	13	12	7	6	15	17	18	12	10
36	Lyndon B. Johnson	Democratic	15	11 (tie)	34	22	25	10	9	9	13	17	9	3	2	8	12	8	5	40	35	17	16
37	Richard Nixon	Republican	16	22	43	16	36	12	31	24	28	27	25	22	35	32	23	28	22	16	42	38	29
38	Gerald Ford	Republican	18	33	10	30	30	31	11	31	30	33	30	25	25	21	33	24	31	28	21	27	27
39	Jimmy Carter	Democratic	26	20	3	15	38	27 (tie)	30	32 (tie)	32	24	28	37	37	19	38	22	28	25	34	26	26
40	Ronald Reagan	Republican	28	18	24	31	3	13	10	15	7	6	18	4	6	18	18	20	16	12	12	16	13
41	George H. W. Bush	Republican	10	28	18	19	20	27 (tie)	13	20	22	28	21	21	20	29	28	19	26	10	17	21	21
42	Bill Clinton	Democratic	21	13	39	8	11	17	3	16	15	8	13	13	18	10	5	12	9	18	30	14	15
43	George W. Bush	Republican	17	30	33	41	21	20	29	35	31	38	38	19	22	28	36	29	30	38	36	34	33
44	Barack Obama	Democratic	25	11 (tie)	13	9	15	23	16	18	16	9	15	23	31	14	10	13	13	20	10	11	17
45	Donald Trump	Republican	44	41	44	44	10	25	43	42	42	43	44	43	43	40	39	44	40	42	41	42	42

=== 2021 C-SPAN ===
Abbreviations
PP = Public persuasion
CL = Crisis leadership
EM = Economic management
MA = Moral authority
IR = International relations
AS = Administrative skills
RC = Relations with Congress
VSA = Vision/Setting an agenda
PEJ = Pursued equal justice for all
PCT = Performance within context of times
O = Overall
Blue backgrounds indicate first quartile.
Green backgrounds indicate second quartile.
Yellow backgrounds indicate third quartile.
Orange backgrounds indicate fourth quartile.

Seq.	President	Political party	PP	CL	EM	MA	IR	AS	RC	VSA	PEJ	PCT	O
1	George Washington	Independent	4	2	2	2	2	2	1	2	14	2	2
2	John Adams	Federalist	22	18	10	8	14	19	22	20	13	18	15
3	Thomas Jefferson	Democratic-Republican	7	8	11	11	11	6	5	6	20	6	7
4	James Madison	Democratic-Republican	19	19	20	12	22	16	12	15	21	12	16
5	James Monroe	Democratic-Republican	17	14	17	14	6	10	9	14	25	11	12
6	John Quincy Adams	Democratic-Republican	26	23	14	10	10	17	29	17	10	22	17
7	Andrew Jackson	Democratic	8	13	25	32	23	27	24	10	39	19	22
8	Martin Van Buren	Democratic	29	34	39	34	26	25	28	30	33	33	34
9	William Henry Harrison	Whig	38	39	41	35	41	40	40	37	36	40	40
10	John Tyler	Independent	40	36	40	37	35	38	41	40	41	38	39
11	James K. Polk	Democratic	13	12	16	28	17	9	13	11	35	17	18
12	Zachary Taylor	Whig	31	29	30	29	31	35	37	32	34	34	35
13	Millard Fillmore	Whig	41	37	36	36	37	37	35	41	38	36	38
14	Franklin Pierce	Democratic	42	42	38	39	40	39	39	42	42	41	42
15	James Buchanan	Democratic	43	44	43	43	44	42	43	44	44	44	44
16	Abraham Lincoln	Republican	2	1	1	1	3	1	4	1	1	1	1
17	Andrew Johnson	National Union	44	43	42	42	42	43	44	43	43	43	43
18	Ulysses S. Grant	Republican	18	16	28	17	18	36	16	21	6	16	20
19	Rutherford B. Hayes	Republican	30	33	29	33	30	31	31	33	31	32	33
20	James A. Garfield	Republican	24	30	26	23	36	28	26	29	16	27	27
21	Chester A. Arthur	Republican	34	31	27	31	33	24	27	31	27	28	30
22/24	Grover Cleveland	Democratic	20	24	22	25	24	23	25	22	29	25	25
23	Benjamin Harrison	Republican	36	32	31	27	29	32	30	34	23	31	32
25	William McKinley	Republican	15	15	13	21	16	12	10	18	26	14	14
26	Theodore Roosevelt	Republican	3	4	4	5	4	5	7	4	11	4	4
27	William Howard Taft	Republican	28	26	19	22	20	15	20	26	19	23	23
28	Woodrow Wilson	Democratic	12	11	12	19	13	11	18	9	37	15	13
29	Warren G. Harding	Republican	33	38	32	40	34	41	33	38	30	37	37
30	Calvin Coolidge	Republican	21	27	21	18	27	21	15	27	24	24	24
31	Herbert Hoover	Republican	39	40	44	30	32	20	36	39	32	39	36
32	Franklin D. Roosevelt	Democratic	1	3	3	3	1	3	3	3	9	3	3
33	Harry S. Truman	Democratic	14	5	8	9	7	8	14	13	4	5	6
34	Dwight D. Eisenhower	Republican	11	6	6	4	5	4	6	16	12	7	5
35	John F. Kennedy	Democratic	6	7	7	16	15	18	11	7	7	9	8
36	Lyndon B. Johnson	Democratic	16	21	18	24	39	7	2	8	2	13	11
37	Richard Nixon	Republican	27	28	24	41	12	26	38	23	28	35	31
38	Gerald Ford	Republican	37	25	33	20	25	29	19	35	17	26	28
39	Jimmy Carter	Democratic	35	35	37	7	28	34	34	24	5	30	26
40	Ronald Reagan	Republican	5	9	15	13	9	30	8	5	22	8	9
41	George H. W. Bush	Republican	25	10	23	15	8	13	17	28	15	21	21
42	Bill Clinton	Democratic	10	20	5	38	19	22	23	19	8	20	19
43	George W. Bush	Republican	23	22	35	26	38	33	21	25	18	29	29
44	Barack Obama	Democratic	9	17	9	6	21	14	32	12	3	10	10
45	Donald Trump	Republican	32	41	34	44	43	44	42	36	40	42	41

=== 2022 Siena College ===
The Siena College Research Institute released their seventh poll results on June 22, 2022. The best 10% and worst 10% remain unchanged from their 2018 poll (top five: F. D. Roosevelt, Lincoln, Washington, T. Roosevelt, Jefferson; bottom five: A. Johnson, Buchanan, Trump, Harding, Pierce). 41% of the scholars polled said that if a president were to be added to Mount Rushmore, it should be FDR. 63% believed that the president should be elected by a national popular vote; whereas, 17% supported the Electoral College.

A year into his term, Joe Biden entered the ranking in the second quartile, at nineteenth place out of 45. Among recent presidents, George H. W. Bush, Bill Clinton, and Barack Obama moved up in the rankings, while George W. Bush and Donald Trump moved down, though part of the downward shift was due to the addition of a new president to the poll. Counting from the other direction, Trump remained unchanged at third place from last. The changes were relatively small (one or two places), apart from Obama, who moved up six places (14%) to eleventh place, in the first quartile. Notable shifts among earlier presidents included the continuing rehabilitation of Lyndon Johnson, up 8 places into the first quartile, and of Ulysses Grant, up 3 places (up 8 in the individual evaluations) into the second quartile; and the lessening appreciation of Andrew Jackson, down 4 places to the median (down 7, into the third quartile, in the individual evaluations); Ronald Reagan, down 5 places, remaining in the second quartile; and Zachary Taylor, down 6 places into the fourth quartile.

Abbreviations
Bg = Background (family, education, experience)
Im = Imagination
Int = Integrity
IQ = Intelligence
L = Luck
WR = Willing to take risks
AC = Ability to compromise
EAb = Executive ability
LA = Leadership ability
CAb = Communication ability (speak, write)
OA = Overall ability
PL = Party leadership
RC = Relationship with Congress
CAp = Court appointments
HE = Handling of U.S. economy
EAp = Executive appointments
DA = Domestic accomplishments
FPA = Foreign policy accomplishments
AM = Avoiding crucial mistakes
PV = Present overall view [the average ranking of the polled experts] (Note: The average evaluation. The wording on the survey was "your present overall view.")
O = Overall rank [the average of the individual parameters] (Note: The average rank as calculated by Siena from the data items in the table. This is usually within a few places of the average evaluation, but more divergent in the cases of Ulysses Grant and Richard Nixon.)

Blue backgrounds indicate first quartile.
Green backgrounds indicate second quartile.
Yellow-green backgrounds indicate the median.
Yellow backgrounds indicate third quartile.
Orange backgrounds indicate fourth quartile.

Seq.	President	Political party	attributes						abilities					accomplishments								average	
Seq.	President	Political party	Bg	Im	Int	IQ	L	WR	AC	EAb	LA	CAb	OA	PL	RC	CAp	HE	EAp	DA	FPA	AM	PV	O
1	George Washington	Independent	6	6	3	12	1	5	3	3	3	11	3	18	3	1	4	1	4	2	1	3	3
2	John Adams	Federalist	5	16	5	4	26	20	35	23	23	12	15	31	33	8	15	17	18	17	20	14	16
3	Thomas Jefferson	Democratic-Republican	7	4	20	2	5	8	14	7	6	5	5	4	5	11	20	7	6	10	8	7	5
4	James Madison	Democratic-Republican	4	7	9	3	13	15	11	12	18	8	9	10	10	14	19	11	13	20	11	11	10
5	James Monroe	Democratic-Republican	13	15	16	21	8	14	7	13	14	15	16	17	9	15	12	13	9	6	6	12	12
6	John Quincy Adams	Democratic-Republican	2	11	7	5	25	19	28	24	21	13	17	29	35	17	13	18	20	15	13	18	17
7	Andrew Jackson	Democratic	38	17	37	32	6	4	41	18	11	20	22	5	21	35	30	26	22	29	27	26	23
8	Martin Van Buren	Democratic	22	24	30	25	37	28	20	29	26	27	29	15	30	27	36	27	30	25	25	29	29
9	William Henry Harrison	Whig	32	39	29	34	45	40	38	38	31	36	38	38	41	42	42	41	41	42	37	39	40
10	John Tyler	Independent	35	37	39	36	31	33	42	40	40	33	40	43	43	40	37	39	36	27	36	37	39
11	James K. Polk	Democratic	26	14	28	23	9	7	22	10	12	17	14	14	11	32	18	21	15	9	10	17	15
12	Zachary Taylor	Whig	40	29	25	38	38	30	33	35	28	39	33	39	36	37	29	34	31	35	23	32	36
13	Millard Fillmore	Whig	42	38	35	39	28	36	31	39	39	38	39	41	39	39	31	36	37	37	34	40	38
14	Franklin Pierce	Democratic	41	41	38	40	39	41	39	41	41	40	41	42	40	41	40	40	40	38	39	41	41
15	James Buchanan	Democratic	37	45	41	42	43	45	43	43	44	44	45	44	44	44	43	42	45	44	45	45	44
16	Abraham Lincoln	Republican	29	1	1	1	21	1	1	1	2	1	1	2	4	3	2	3	1	4	2	1	2
17	Andrew Johnson	Democratic	44	44	42	44	42	39	45	45	45	45	44	45	45	45	44	44	44	43	44	43	45
18	Ulysses S. Grant	Republican	31	23	18	24	19	16	16	22	13	19	20	22	16	20	23	38	17	22	31	16	21
19	Rutherford B. Hayes	Republican	29	31	32	29	20	37	23	32	32	31	31	30	26	22	28	23	32	33	19	30	31
20	James A. Garfield	Republican	25	25	22	20	41	30	25	26	24	21	24	26	19	31	24	29	29	30	21	27	27
21	Chester A. Arthur	Republican	39	34	36	37	16	34	29	34	36	34	36	35	28	32	27	33	28	34	22	34	33
22/24	Grover Cleveland	Democratic	34	28	23	26	22	29	27	20	20	23	27	20	23	25	32	23	26	24	24	24	26
23	Benjamin Harrison	Republican	27	32	33	33	29	35	33	36	34	32	34	36	29	28	33	31	35	32	28	31	34
25	William McKinley	Republican	23	26	26	28	33	25	26	15	19	22	18	11	14	24	16	19	23	11	14	21	22
26	Theodore Roosevelt	Republican	3	3	10	6	2	3	18	4	4	4	4	7	7	6	3	5	5	5	5	4	4
27	William Howard Taft	Republican	10	30	11	14	30	38	19	27	33	25	28	34	24	19	17	25	24	28	26	25	25
28	Woodrow Wilson	Democratic	9	9	21	8	15	11	37	9	17	10	13	8	13	16	11	15	11	13	30	15	13
29	Warren G. Harding	Republican	43	42	43	43	35	43	36	42	42	42	42	40	34	38	35	43	39	40	40	42	42
30	Calvin Coolidge	Republican	33	40	19	31	12	42	30	33	38	41	35	27	25	29	25	35	38	36	18	33	32
31	Herbert Hoover	Republican	14	36	15	15	44	44	40	28	37	29	32	33	38	30	45	32	42	31	42	38	37
32	Franklin D. Roosevelt	Democratic	1	2	14	10	6	2	2	2	1	2	2	1	2	2	1	2	2	1	4	2	1
33	Harry S. Truman	Democratic	28	13	8	19	11	9	13	8	8	14	10	12	15	12	7	9	8	3	7	5	7
34	Dwight D. Eisenhower	Republican	11	20	4	16	4	18	5	5	5	18	7	9	6	5	6	12	7	7	3	6	6
35	John F. Kennedy	Democratic	12	5	27	12	27	10	8	14	7	3	12	16	12	13	9	4	14	12	15	10	9
36	Lyndon B. Johnson	Democratic	16	10	31	18	18	6	6	6	9	16	6	3	1	4	8	6	3	39	35	9	8
37	Richard Nixon	Republican	17	21	44	17	36	12	21	25	27	26	25	23	32	26	22	30	16	14	41	36	28
38	Gerald Ford	Republican	24	33	13	30	32	32	15	30	30	35	30	28	20	23	38	22	33	26	29	28	30
39	Jimmy Carter	Democratic	21	19	2	11	40	26	24	31	29	24	26	37	37	18	34	16	25	23	32	23	24
40	Ronald Reagan	Republican	36	18	24	35	3	13	17	19	10	7	21	6	8	21	21	28	21	16	17	19	18
41	George H. W. Bush	Republican	8	27	17	22	24	27	12	17	22	28	19	24	17	36	26	20	27	8	12	22	20
42	Bill Clinton	Democratic	19	12	40	9	10	17	4	16	16	9	11	13	18	7	5	14	12	18	33	13	14
43	George W. Bush	Republican	20	35	34	41	23	22	32	37	35	37	37	21	22	34	39	37	34	41	38	35	35
44	Barack Obama	Democratic	18	7	6	7	14	21	10	11	15	6	8	19	27	9	10	8	10	19	9	8	11
45	Donald Trump	Republican	45	43	45	45	17	23	44	44	43	43	43	32	42	43	41	45	43	45	43	44	43
46	Joe Biden	Democratic	15	22	12	27	34	24	9	21	25	30	23	25	31	10	14	10	19	21	16	20	19

== Surveys on diversity and inclusion ==
In May 2019, Alvin Tillery of the Center for the Study of Diversity and Democracy at Northwestern University and Christina Greer of Fordham University "conducted a poll of 113 academic researchers and asked them to rate the 14 most recent presidents on both their overall leadership and rhetoric on diversity and inclusion using a scale ranging from 0 to 100." Survey respondents were significantly more liberal than the national average, "with only 13 percent of the respondents describing themselves as either moderate, slightly conservative, or conservative."

Rank	Overall (performance + diversity and inclusion score)	Diversity and inclusion leadership score only
1	Franklin D. Roosevelt (83/100)	Barack Obama (75/100)
2	Barack Obama (77/100)	Bill Clinton (54/100)
3	Lyndon B. Johnson (69/100)	Jimmy Carter (43/100)
4	Bill Clinton (62/100)	George W. Bush (41/100)
5	John F. Kennedy (61/100)	Lyndon B. Johnson (40/100)
6	Harry S. Truman (57/100)	George H. W. Bush (34/100)
7	Dwight D. Eisenhower (54.4/100)	Franklin D. Roosevelt (31/100)
8	Ronald Reagan (54.1/100)	Gerald Ford (30/100)
9	Jimmy Carter (50/100)	John F. Kennedy (28.4/100)
10	George H. W. Bush (49/100)	Harry S. Truman (28/100)
11	Gerald Ford (39/100)	Ronald Reagan (27.8/100)
12	George W. Bush (38/100)	Dwight D. Eisenhower (26/100)
13	Richard Nixon (32/100)	Richard Nixon (24/100)
14	Donald Trump (11/100)	Donald Trump (9/100)

In May 2017, Tillery and Walton used historical editorials in black newspapers to create a ranking of US presidents based on the views of contemporary journalists. The authors described this process as "examining the viewpoints of black experts", contrasting with rankings by historians. Editorials were scored as either positive, neutral, or negative. Presidents were ranked by the percentage of such editorials about them which were positive. Presidents from 1901 to 2016 (Theodore Roosevelt to Barack Obama) were ranked on two criteria: overall percentage of positive editorials, and fraction of positive editorials focusing specifically on the topics of civil rights and race relations.

Rank	Overall editorial score	Civil rights editorial score
1	Franklin D. Roosevelt (51%)	Lyndon B. Johnson (90%)
2	Theodore Roosevelt (48%)	Dwight D. Eisenhower (61%)
3	Dwight D. Eisenhower (45%)	Franklin D. Roosevelt (58%)
4	Lyndon B. Johnson (40%)	Harry S. Truman (49%)
5	Barack Obama (33%)	Warren G. Harding (45%)
6	Harry S. Truman (31%)	Theodore Roosevelt (39%)
7	Calvin Coolidge (30%)	Barack Obama (38%)
8	Warren G. Harding (28%)	John F. Kennedy (37%)
9	William Howard Taft (27%)	Gerald Ford (33%)
10	John F. Kennedy (26%)	Bill Clinton (26%)
11	Gerald Ford (25%)	Calvin Coolidge (25%)
12	Richard Nixon (21%)	William Howard Taft (23%)
13	Bill Clinton (19%)	Jimmy Carter (18%)
14	Jimmy Carter (16%)	Richard Nixon (15%)
15	Ronald Reagan (15%)	Ronald Reagan (14%)
16	Herbert Hoover (11%)	Woodrow Wilson (10%)
17	Woodrow Wilson (10%)	George H. W. Bush (9%)
18	George W. Bush (5%)	George W. Bush (6%)
19	George H. W. Bush (4%)	Herbert Hoover (0%)

Some presidents rank similarly in the overall editorial ranking as in surveys of historians, such as Theodore Roosevelt and Franklin D. Roosevelt at the top of the list. Other presidents are ranked very differently. Warren G. Harding is consistently ranked as the worst of these presidents in historian surveys, but is ranked above average here. By contrast, Woodrow Wilson typically ranks well above average among this group in historian surveys, but third-to-last in this ranking. From the overall score to the civil rights score, Lyndon B. Johnson moved from 40% positive to 90% positive, the largest absolute shift in the dataset.

== Public opinion polls ==
=== 2010 Gallup poll ===
A Gallup poll taken on November 19–21, 2010, asked 1,037 Americans to say, based on what they know or remember about the nine most recent former presidents, whether they approve or disapprove of how each handled his job in office.

1. John F. Kennedy (85% approval/10% disapproval)
2. Ronald Reagan (74% approval/24% disapproval)
3. Bill Clinton (69% approval/30% disapproval)
4. George H. W. Bush (64% approval/34% disapproval)
5. Gerald Ford (61% approval/26% disapproval)
6. Jimmy Carter (52% approval/42% disapproval)
7. Lyndon B. Johnson (49% approval/36% disapproval)
8. George W. Bush (47% approval/51% disapproval)
9. Richard Nixon (29% approval/65% disapproval)

=== 2011 Gallup poll ===
A Gallup poll about presidential greatness taken February 2–5, 2011, asked 1,015 American adults the following question: "Who do you regard as the greatest United States president?"

1. Ronald Reagan (19%)
2. Abraham Lincoln (14%)
3. Bill Clinton (13%)
4. John F. Kennedy (11%)
5. George Washington (10%)
6. Franklin Roosevelt (8%)
7. Barack Obama (5%)
8. Theodore Roosevelt (3%)
9. Harry S. Truman (3%)
10. George W. Bush (2%)
11. Thomas Jefferson (2%)
12. Jimmy Carter (1%)
13. Dwight Eisenhower (1%)
14. George H. W. Bush (1%)
15. Andrew Jackson (<0.5%)
16. Lyndon B. Johnson (<0.5%)
17. Richard Nixon (<0.5%)

In addition, "Other" received 1%, "None" received 1% and "No opinion" received 5%.

=== 2011 Vision Critical/Angus Reid Public Opinion poll ===
A Vision Critical/Angus Reid Public Opinion poll taken on February 18–19, 2011, asked 1,010 respondents about 11 former presidents plus the current president and whether each was a good or bad president.

1. John F. Kennedy (80% approval/6% disapproval)
2. Ronald Reagan (72% approval/16% disapproval)
3. Bill Clinton (65% approval/24% disapproval)
4. Dwight D. Eisenhower (61% approval/6% disapproval)
5. Harry S. Truman (57% approval/7% disapproval)
6. Jimmy Carter (47% approval/28% disapproval)
7. George H. W. Bush (44% approval/38% disapproval)
8. Barack Obama (41% approval/33% disapproval)
9. Gerald Ford (37% approval/25% disapproval)
10. Lyndon B. Johnson (33% approval/27% disapproval)
11. George W. Bush (30% approval/55% disapproval)
12. Richard Nixon (24% approval/54% disapproval)

=== 2011 Public Policy Polling poll ===
A Public Policy Polling poll taken between September 8–11, 2011, asked 665 American voters whether they held favorable or unfavorable views of how each of the nine most recent former presidents performed their job.

1. John F. Kennedy (74% favorability/15% unfavorability)
2. Ronald Reagan (60% favorability/30% unfavorability)
3. Bill Clinton (62% favorability/34% unfavorability)
4. George H. W. Bush (53% favorability/35% unfavorability)
5. Gerald Ford (45% favorability/26% unfavorability)
6. Jimmy Carter (45% favorability/43% unfavorability)
7. Lyndon B. Johnson (36% favorability/39% unfavorability)
8. George W. Bush (41% favorability/51% unfavorability)
9. Richard Nixon (19% favorability/62% unfavorability)

=== 2013 Gallup poll ===
A Gallup poll taken November 7–10, 2013, asked 1,039 American adults the following question: "How do you think each of the following presidents will go down in history—as an outstanding president, above average, average, below average, or poor?".

2013 Gallup poll
President	Outstanding	Above average	Average	Below average	Poor	No opinion	Weighted average (Note: The weights were 5 for "Outstanding", 4 for "Above Average", 3 for "Average", 2 for "Below Average", and 1 for "Poor".)
Dwight D. Eisenhower	10%	39%	36%	2%	1%	12%	3.63
John F. Kennedy	18%	56%	19%	2%	1%	4%	3.92
Lyndon B. Johnson	4%	16%	46%	14%	8%	12%	2.93
Richard Nixon	2%	13%	27%	29%	23%	6%	2.38
Gerald Ford	2%	14%	56%	15%	5%	8%	2.92
Jimmy Carter	4%	19%	37%	20%	15%	6%	2.76
Ronald Reagan	19%	42%	27%	6%	4%	2%	3.67
George H. W. Bush	3%	24%	48%	12%	10%	2%	2.98
Bill Clinton	11%	44%	29%	9%	6%	1%	3.45
George W. Bush	3%	18%	36%	20%	23%	1%	2.58
Barack Obama	6%	22%	31%	18%	22%	1%	2.72

=== 2014 Quinnipiac poll ===
A Quinnipiac University poll taken June 24–30, 2014, asked 1,446 American registered voters who they believed were the best and worst presidents since World War II.

Best president since World War II:

1. Ronald Reagan (35%)
2. Bill Clinton (18%)
3. John F. Kennedy (15%)
4. Barack Obama (8%)
5. Dwight Eisenhower (5%)
6. Harry S. Truman (4%)
7. Lyndon B. Johnson (tie) (3%)
7. George H. W. Bush (tie) (3%)
9. Jimmy Carter (2%)
10. Richard Nixon (tie) (1%)
10. Gerald Ford (tie) (1%)
10. George W. Bush (tie) (1%)

Worst president since World War II:

1. Barack Obama (33%)
2. George W. Bush (28%)
3. Richard Nixon (13%)
4. Jimmy Carter (8%)
5. Lyndon B. Johnson (tie) (3%)
5. Ronald Reagan (tie) (3%)
5. Bill Clinton (tie) (3%)
8. Gerald Ford (tie) (2%)
8. George H. W. Bush (tie) (2%)
10. Dwight Eisenhower (1%)
11. Harry S. Truman (tie) (<1%)
11. John F. Kennedy (tie) (<1%)

=== 2017 Quinnipiac poll ===
Two and a half years later, a Quinnipiac University poll taken January 20–25, 2017, asked 1,190 American voters who they believed were the best and worst presidents since World War II.

Best president since World War II:

1. Ronald Reagan (30%)
2. Barack Obama (29%)
3. John F. Kennedy (12%)
4. Bill Clinton (9%)
5. Dwight Eisenhower (tie) (3%)
5. George W. Bush (tie) (3%)
7. Harry S. Truman (tie) (2%)
7. Lyndon B. Johnson (tie) (2%)
7. Jimmy Carter (tie) (2%)
7. George H. W. Bush (tie) (2%)
11. Richard Nixon (tie) (<1%)
11. Gerald Ford (tie) (<1%)

Worst president since World War II:

1. Richard Nixon (24%)
2. Barack Obama (23%)
3. George W. Bush (22%)
4. Jimmy Carter (10%)
5. Ronald Reagan (5%)
6. Bill Clinton (4%)
7. Lyndon B. Johnson (3%)
8. George H. W. Bush (2%)
9. Gerald Ford (1%)
10. Harry S. Truman (tie) (<1%)
10. Dwight Eisenhower (tie) (<1%)
10. John F. Kennedy (tie) (<1%)

=== 2017 Morning Consult poll ===
Including President Donald Trump for the first time, a Morning Consult poll taken February 9–10, 2017, asked 1,791 American registered voters who they believed were the best and worst presidents since World War II.

Best president since World War II:

1. Ronald Reagan (26%)
2. Barack Obama (20%)
3. John F. Kennedy (17%)
4. Bill Clinton (9%)
5. Donald Trump (6%)
6. George W. Bush (tie) (2%)
6. Harry S. Truman (tie) (2%)
6. Jimmy Carter (tie) (2%)
6. George H. W. Bush (tie) (2%)
10. Richard Nixon (tie) (1%)
10. Lyndon B. Johnson (tie) (1%)
12. Gerald Ford (<1%)

Worst president since World War II:

1. Donald Trump (26%)
2. Barack Obama (25%)
3. Richard Nixon (13%)
4. George W. Bush (7%)
5. Bill Clinton (6%)
6. Jimmy Carter (5%)
7. George H. W. Bush (3%)
8. Lyndon B. Johnson (2%)
9. Ronald Reagan (tie) (1%)
9. Gerald Ford (tie) (1%)
9. Dwight D. Eisenhower (tie) (1%)
9. Harry S. Truman (tie) (1%)
13. John F. Kennedy (<1%)

=== 2018 Quinnipiac poll ===
A Quinnipiac University poll taken March 3–5, 2018, asked 1,122 American voters who they believed were the best and worst presidents since World War II.

Best president since World War II:

1. Ronald Reagan (28%)
2. Barack Obama (24%)
3. John F. Kennedy (tie) (10%)
3. Bill Clinton (tie) (10%)
5. Donald Trump (7%)
6. Dwight Eisenhower (4%)
7. Harry S. Truman (tie) (3%)
7. Jimmy Carter (tie) (3%)
9. Lyndon B. Johnson (2%)
10. George H. W. Bush (tie) (1%)
10. Richard Nixon (tie) (1%)
10. George W. Bush (tie) (1%)
13. Gerald Ford (<1%)

Worst president since World War II:

1. Donald Trump (41%)
2. Barack Obama (21%)
3. Richard Nixon (10%)
4. Jimmy Carter (8%)
5. George W. Bush (6%)
6. Bill Clinton (4%)
7. Lyndon B. Johnson (tie) (2%)
7. Ronald Reagan (tie) (2%)
9. Gerald Ford (1%)
10. Harry S. Truman (tie) (<1%)
10. Dwight Eisenhower (tie) (<1%)
10. John F. Kennedy (tie) (<1%)
10. George H. W. Bush (tie) (<1%)

=== 2021 Gallup poll ===
A Gallup poll taken January 4–15, 2021, asked 1,023 American adults the following question: "How do you think each of the following presidents will go down in history—as an outstanding president, above average, average, below average, or poor?"

2021 Gallup
President	Outstanding	Above average	Average	Below average	Poor	Weighted average
John F. Kennedy	23%	47%	25%	2%	1%	3.83
Richard Nixon	4%	7%	26%	29%	30%	2.14
Jimmy Carter	6%	21%	43%	14%	10%	2.81
Ronald Reagan	17%	35%	30%	10%	6%	3.41
George H. W. Bush	7%	21%	53%	11%	6%	3.06
Bill Clinton	10%	26%	37%	16%	11%	3.08
George W. Bush	6%	18%	49%	16%	10%	2.91
Barack Obama	21%	35%	22%	11%	12%	3.45
Donald Trump	9%	20%	10%	14%	47%	2.30

=== 2023 YouGov survey ===
YouGov took a survey of 1,000 U.S. adult citizens between November 20–27, 2023. Respondents were asked: "How would you rate the president listed below?" There was a margin of error of 4.1% in the poll.

2023 YouGov survey
President	Outstanding	Above average	Average	Below average	Poor	Not sure	Weighted avg. (excl. "Not sure")
Lyndon B. Johnson	3%	18%	31%	10%	9%	29%	2.94
Richard Nixon	4%	13%	26%	22%	20%	15%	2.52
Jimmy Carter	10%	23%	27%	13%	13%	13%	3.01
Ronald Reagan	24%	23%	20%	11%	10%	12%	3.45
George H. W. Bush	4%	19%	40%	15%	10%	12%	2.91
Bill Clinton	9%	23%	32%	17%	10%	9%	3.04
George W. Bush	4%	17%	38%	20%	13%	8%	2.77
Barack Obama	19%	21%	18%	13%	23%	5%	2.97
Donald Trump	20%	17%	11%	9%	38%	4%	2.68
Joe Biden	9%	13%	22%	11%	40%	5%	2.37

=== 2024 Gallup poll ===
A Gallup poll taken December 2–18, 2024, asked the following question: "How do you think each of the following presidents will go down in history—as an outstanding president, above average, average, below average, or poor?"

2024 Gallup poll
President	Outstanding	Above average	Average	Below average	Poor	Weighted average
John F. Kennedy	22%	48%	24%	1%	1%	3.77
Richard Nixon	4%	8%	28%	24%	30%	2.14
Jimmy Carter	10%	22%	36%	11%	15%	2.83
Ronald Reagan	22%	32%	27%	7%	9%	3.42
George H. W. Bush	7%	21%	48%	13%	8%	2.97
Bill Clinton	7%	27%	36%	15%	14%	2.95
George W. Bush	5%	19%	42%	18%	15%	2.78
Barack Obama	19%	29%	25%	11%	16%	3.24
Donald Trump	17%	23%	16%	13%	31%	2.82
Joe Biden	6%	13%	26%	17%	37%	2.31

== Memorability of the presidents ==
=== 2014 Roediger–DeSoto survey ===
In November 2014, Henry L. Roediger III and K. Andrew DeSoto published a study in the journal Science asking research subjects to name as many presidents as possible. They reported data from three generations as well as from an online survey conducted in 2014.

1. Barack Obama (100%)
2. Bill Clinton (96%)
3. George W. Bush or George H. W. Bush (95%)
4. George Washington (94%)
5. Abraham Lincoln (88%)
6. John F. Kennedy (83%)
7. Richard Nixon (82%)
8. Jimmy Carter (79%)
9. Thomas Jefferson (72%)
10. Ronald Reagan (66%)
11. Gerald Ford (62%)
12. Franklin D. Roosevelt or Theodore Roosevelt (60%)
13. John Adams or John Quincy Adams (56%)
14. Dwight D. Eisenhower (54%)
15. Harry S. Truman (50%)
16. Andrew Jackson (47%)
17. Herbert Hoover (42%)
18. Andrew Johnson or Lyndon B. Johnson (41%)
19. William Howard Taft (39%)
20. James Madison (38%)
21. Ulysses S. Grant (38%)
22. James Monroe (30%)
23. Woodrow Wilson (29%)
24. Calvin Coolidge (22%)
25. James A. Garfield (19%)
26. James K. Polk (17%)
27. Warren G. Harding (16%)
28. William McKinley (15%)
29. John Tyler (12%)
30. James Buchanan (12%)
31. Grover Cleveland (11%)
32. William Henry Harrison or Benjamin Harrison (11%)
33. Martin Van Buren (11%)
34. Rutherford B. Hayes (10%)
35. Zachary Taylor (10%)
36. Millard Fillmore (8%)
37. Franklin Pierce (7%)
38. Chester A. Arthur (7%)

=== 2021 facial recognition survey ===
In July 2021, Furman University psychologists asked Americans recruited via Amazon Mechanical Turk to identify which among 132 historical portraits depicted a president (no name required). On average, a president was correctly identified as such by 58% of respondents and a non-president falsely identified by 20%. The rates for individual presidents were:

- 1=. Bill Clinton (98%)
- 1=. Barack Obama (98%)
- 3. George W. Bush (96%)
- 4. Abraham Lincoln (95%)
- 5. Ronald Reagan (94%)
- 6. George Washington (93%)
- 7. Richard Nixon (92%)
- 8. George H. W. Bush (90%)
- 9. John F. Kennedy (88%)
- 10. Jimmy Carter (83%)
- 11. Lyndon B. Johnson (82%)
- 12=. Thomas Jefferson (77%)
- 12=. William Howard Taft (77%)
- 14. Theodore Roosevelt (75%)
- 15. Dwight D. Eisenhower (74%)
- 16. Harry S. Truman (73%)
- 17. Andrew Jackson (65%)
- 18. Franklin D. Roosevelt (59%)
- 19=. Grover Cleveland (53%)
- 19=. Benjamin Harrison (53%)
- 21=. Martin Van Buren (52%)
- 21=. Gerald Ford (52%)
- 23. James Madison (51%)
- 24=. James A. Garfield (50%)
- 24=. Woodrow Wilson (50%)
- 26=. William Henry Harrison (48%)
- 26=. John Quincy Adams (48%)
- 28. Rutherford B. Hayes (47%)
- 29. Herbert Hoover (46%)
- 30=. John Adams (43%)
- 30=. James K. Polk (43%)
- 31=. Franklin Pierce (42%)
- 31=. Chester A. Arthur (42%)
- 34. Ulysses S. Grant (37%)
- 35. John Tyler (36%)
- 36. William McKinley (35%)
- 37=. Millard Fillmore (31%)
- 37=. Warren G. Harding (31%)
- 39. Zachary Taylor (28%)
- 40. James Monroe (26%)
- 41. Andrew Johnson (24%)
- 42. Calvin Coolidge (21%)
- 43. James Buchanan (18%)

== Reception ==
Gerard Baker, U.S. editor for The Times, wrote in 2008 that "the 42 American presidents fall into a well-established, bell-curve or normal distribution on a chart – a handful of outstanding ones, a handful of duds, and a lot of so-sos. I couldn't, in all honesty therefore, really say that number 13 on the list is that much better than number 30." Political scientist Walter Dean Burnham described "dichotomous or schizoid profiles" of presidents, making some hard to classify in his opinion. Historian Alan Brinkley said "there are presidents who could be considered both failures and great or near great (for example, Wilson, [Lyndon B.] Johnson, Nixon)". Historian and political scientist James MacGregor Burns observed of Nixon: "How can one evaluate such an idiosyncratic president, so brilliant and so morally lacking?"

David Herbert Donald, a noted biographer of Abraham Lincoln, relates that when he met John F. Kennedy in 1961, Kennedy voiced his deep dissatisfaction and resentment with historians who had rated some of his predecessors. Kennedy remarked, "No one has a right to grade a president—even poor James Buchanan—who has not sat in his chair, examined the mail and information that came across his desk, and learned why he made his decisions." Historian and political scientist Julian E. Zelizer has argued that traditional presidential rankings explain little concerning actual presidential history and that they are "weak mechanisms for evaluating what has taken place in the White House." The broadly static nature of the rankings over multiple decades has also been called into question by some critics, particularly given the frequent exposure of previously unknown material about American government. The first British survey, published in 2011, places some small government advocates higher than recent U.S. surveys have: Thomas Jefferson at 4, Ronald Reagan at 8, and Andrew Jackson at 9 (compared to 7th, 10th, and 13th in C-SPAN 2009).

=== Survey takers ===
In 2002, Ron Walters, former director of the University of Maryland's African American Leadership Institute, stated that ranking based on the presidents' ability to balance the interests of the majority and those of excluded groups was practical in respect to American debate on racial politics. Presidents have traditionally been ranked on personal qualities and their leadership ability to solve problems that move the nation in a positive direction. Walters stated that there was a qualitative difference between presidential evaluations from white and African-American intellectuals. He gives as an example of this difference a comparison between two contemporary studies, a 1996 New York Times poll by Arthur M. Schlesinger Jr., where 31 white historians and one black historian ranked presidents as "Great", "Near Great", "High Average", "Average", "Below Average", or "Failure", and a survey performed by professors Hanes Walton Jr. and Robert Smith and featured in their book American Politics and the African American Quest for Universal Freedom, where 44 African-American political scientists and historians ranked presidents as "White Supremacist", "Racist", "Racially Neutral", "Racially Ambivalent", or "Antiracist".

A 2012 analysis by Mark Zachary Taylor faulted presidential surveys with "partisan bias and subjective judgments", suggesting an algorithm to rank of the presidents based on objectively measurable economic statistics. His algorithm placed Franklin D. Roosevelt as the best president for the economy, followed by Warren G. Harding, Rutherford B. Hayes, and William McKinley (all three tied for second). The worst-ranked presidents were Herbert Hoover and Martin Van Buren (tied).

=== Claims of bias ===
In 2010, Alvin S. Felzenberg criticized what he saw as a liberal bias in presidential rankings. In particular, he ranked Ronald Reagan in third place, substantially higher than averaged rankings. In reviewing his book, Michael Genovese said that "Felzenberg is upset—with some justification—at the liberal bias he sees as so prevalent in the ranking of U.S. presidents by historians and political scientists. To remedy this, he has provided a counter to the liberal bias with a conservative bias. In doing so, he commits all the sins of which he accuses liberals. This book is a mirror image of the work he finds so troubling. ... It is unscientific, impressionistic, and highly subjective."

The historically low rankings of Donald Trump during the first year of the first Trump presidency were met with mixed approval given that historical ranking is largely based on long-term effects of a president's decisions, which cannot be reliably assessed in the first year.

== See also ==
Individual presidents

- Legacy of George Washington
- Historical reputation of Thomas Jefferson
- Historical reputation of Ulysses S. Grant
- Historical reputation of Warren G. Harding
- Public image of Bill Clinton
- Public image of George W. Bush
- Public image of Barack Obama
- Public image of Donald Trump
- Public image of Joe Biden

Other countries

- Historical rankings of chancellors of Germany
- Historical rankings of prime ministers of Australia
- Historical rankings of prime ministers of Canada
- Historical rankings of prime ministers of the Netherlands
- Historical rankings of prime ministers of the United Kingdom
