= Historical reputation of Warren G. Harding =

Reputation of the 29th US president

Warren G. Harding, the 29th president of the United States, died in office as one of the most popular presidents in the country's history, but the subsequent exposure of the scandals eroded his popular regard, as did revelations of several extramarital affairs. In historical rankings during the decades after his term in office, Harding was often rated among the worst. However, in recent decades, many historians have begun to fundamentally reassess the conventional views of Harding's historical record in office.

== Overview ==
Upon his death, Harding was deeply mourned—not only in the United States, but around the world. He was called a man of peace in many European newspapers. American journalists praised him lavishly, with some describing him as having given his life for his country. His associates were stunned by his demise. Harry Daugherty wrote, "I can hardly write about it or allow myself to think about it yet." Charles Evans Hughes stated, "I cannot realize that our beloved Chief is no longer with us."

=== Negative views ===
Hagiographic accounts of Harding's life quickly followed his death, such as Joe Mitchell Chapple's Life and Times of Warren G. Harding, Our After-War President (1924). By then, however, the scandals were breaking, and the Harding administration soon became a byword for corruption in the view of the public. Works written in the late 1920s helped shape Harding's historical reputation: William Allen White's Masks in a Pageant (1928) mocked and dismissed Harding, as did Samuel Hopkins Adams' fictionalized account of the Harding administration, Revelry (1926). These books depicted Harding's time in office as one of great presidential weakness. The publication of Nan Britton's bestselling book, which disclosed that they had had an affair, also lowered the late president in public esteem. President Calvin Coolidge, wishing to distance himself from his predecessor, refused to dedicate the Harding Tomb. Herbert Hoover, Coolidge's successor, was similarly reluctant, but with Coolidge in attendance, presided over the dedication in 1931. By that time, with the Great Depression in full swing, Hoover was nearly as discredited as Harding.

Adams continued to shape the negative view of Harding with several nonfiction works in the 1930s, culminating with The Incredible Era—The Life and Times of Warren G. Harding (1939) in which he called his subject "an amiable, well-meaning third-rate Mr. Babbitt, with the equipment of a small-town semi-educated journalist ... It could not work. It did not work." John Dean views the works of White and Adams "remarkably unbalanced and unfair accounts, exaggerating the negative, assigning responsibility to Harding for all wrongs, and denying him credit for anything done right. Today there is considerable evidence refuting their portrayals of Harding. Yet the myth has persisted."

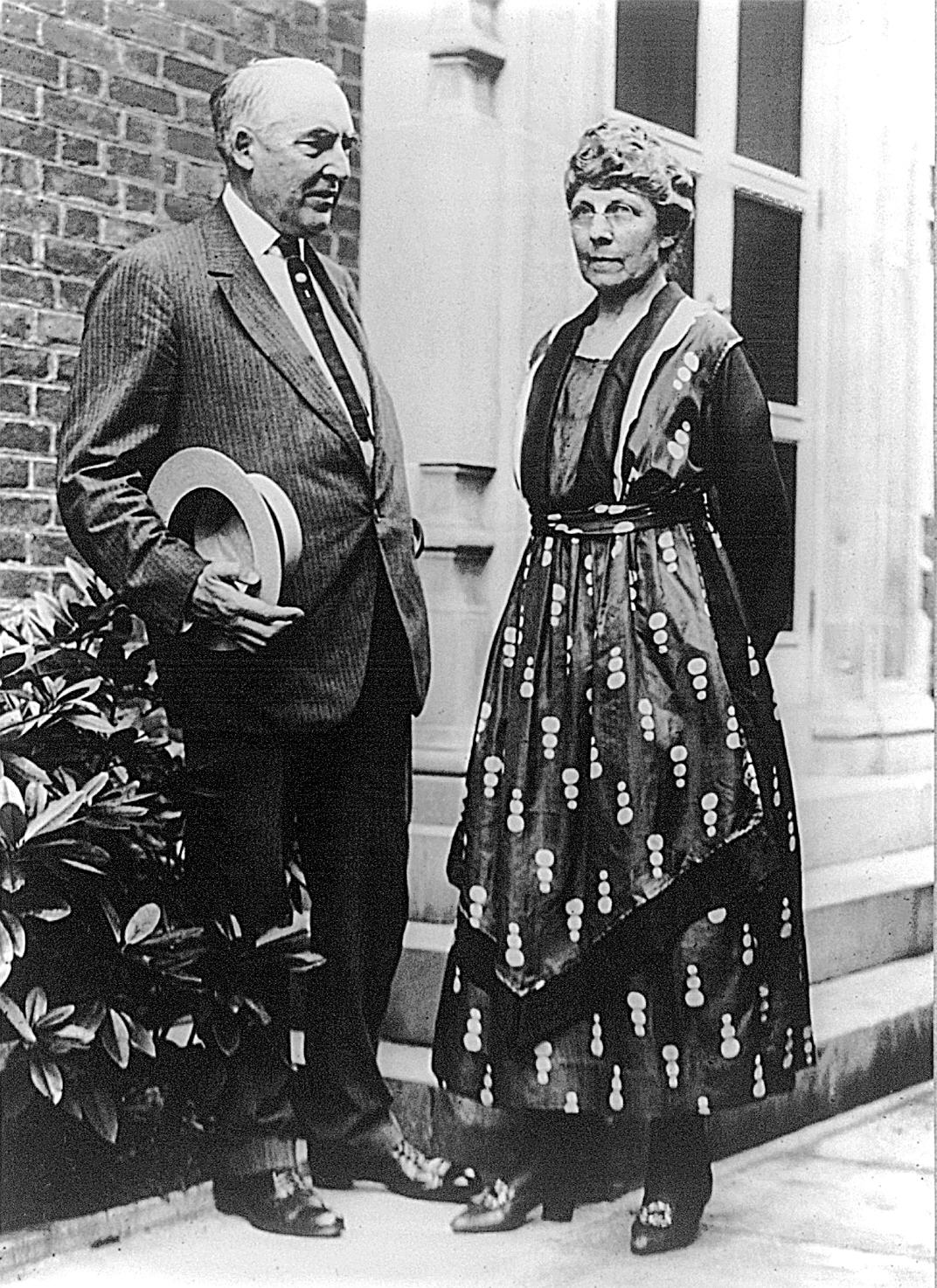
Warren and Florence Harding, c. 1922. Florence Harding was highly protective of her husband's legacy.

The opening of Harding's papers for research in 1964 sparked a small spate of biographies, of which the most controversial was Francis Russell's The Shadow of Blooming Grove (1968), which concluded that the rumors of black ancestry (the "shadow" of the title) deeply affected Harding in his formative years, causing both Harding's conservatism and his desire to get along with everyone. Coffey faults Russell's methods, and deems the biography "largely critical, though not entirely unsympathetic." Historian Robert K. Murray's The Harding Era (1969) took a more positive view of the president, and put him in the context of his times. Eugene P. Trani and David L. Wilson faulted Murray for "a tendency to go overboard" in trying to connect Harding with the successful policies of his cabinet officers, and for asserting, without sufficient evidence, that a new, more assertive Harding had emerged by 1923.

Later decades saw revisionist books published on Harding. Robert Ferrell's The Strange Deaths of President Harding (1996), according to Coffey, "spends almost the entire work challenging every story about Harding and concludes that almost everything that is read and taught about his subject is wrong." In 2004, Dean, noted for his involvement in another presidential scandal, Watergate, wrote the Harding volume in "The American Presidents" series of short biographies, edited by Arthur M. Schlesinger Jr. Coffey considered that book the most revisionist to date, and faults Dean for glossing over some unfavorable episodes in Harding's life, like his silence during the 1914 United States Senate election in Ohio when his opponent, Timothy S. Hogan, was being attacked for his faith.

External videos
- Booknotes interview with Robert Ferrell on The Strange Deaths of President Harding, January 12, 1997, C-SPAN
- Booknotes interview with John Dean on Warren G. Harding, March 14, 2004, C-SPAN

Trani faults Harding's own lack of depth and decisiveness as bringing about his tarnished legacy.

Harding has traditionally been ranked as one of the worst American presidents. In a 1948 poll conducted by Harvard University, historian Arthur M. Schlesinger Sr. conducted a survey of scholars' opinions of the presidents, ranking Harding last among the 29 presidents considered. He has also been last in many other polls since then.

Ferrell attributes Harding's negative ratings to scholars who read little that is substantive, and who focus more on sensational accounts of Harding. Coffey believes "the academic lack of interest in Harding has cost him his reputation, as scholars still rank Harding as nearly dead last among presidents."

=== Reassessment ===
In historical rankings of the presidents during the decades after his term in office, Harding was often rated among the worst. However, in the 2010s, some authors and historians have begun to fundamentally reassess the conventional views of Harding's historical record in office. In The Spoils of War (2016), Bruce Bueno de Mesquita and Alastair Smith place Harding first in a combined ranking of fewest wartime deaths and highest annual per capita income growth during each president's time in office.

Murray argued in his book The Harding Era that Harding deserves more credit than historians have given: "He was certainly the equal of a Franklin Pierce, an Andrew Johnson, a Benjamin Harrison, or even a Calvin Coolidge. In concrete accomplishments, his administration was superior to a sizable portion of those in the nation's history."

Murray notes some general points regarding Harding's poor standing which illustrate the relatively obscure and weak basis for negative critiques of Harding in general. Namely, the conventional views often entail omission of an actual critique or analysis of President's Harding's actions, and often consist of a relatively limited and arbitrary focus on the nature of Harding's appointees, to the omission and detriment of a broader analysis of larger historical facts. Murray states:

In the American system, there is no such thing as an innocent bystander in the White House. If Harding can rightly claim the achievements of a Hughes in State or a Hoover in Commerce, he must also shoulder responsibility for a Daugherty in Justice and a Fall in Interior. Especially must he bear the onus of his lack of punitive action against such men as Forbes and Smith. By his inaction, he forfeited whatever chance he had to maintain the integrity of his position and salvage a favorable image for himself and his administration. As it was, the subsequent popular and scholarly negative verdict was inevitable, if not wholly deserved.

Various historians have defended Harding, with many arguing that he was merely below average rather than a total failure. Murray wrote that, "in establishing the political philosophy and program for an entire decade, [Harding's] 882 days in office were more significant than all but a few similar short periods in the nation's existence." Authors Marcus Raskin and Robert Spero, in 2007, also believed that Harding was underrated, and admired Harding's quest for world peace after World War I and his successful naval disarmament among strongly armed nations, including France, Britain, and Japan. In his book The Leaders We Deserved (and a Few We Didn't): Rethinking the Presidential Rating Game (2010), presidential historian Alvin S. Felzenberg, ranking presidents on several criteria, ranked Harding 26th out of 40 presidents considered.

In some cases, it is the very ubiquity and conventionality of the criticisms of Harding that has impelled some historians to take a closer look and seek a more objective reassessment. For example, one historian wrote a detailed study subtitled "You've always heard Harding was the worst President. Sex in the White House. Bribes on Capitol Hill. Was he really that bad?", which states, in part:

For years I shared this general [negative] opinion of Harding. But then I started to study him. Actually I began with his wife, Florence, working on what has just become a published biography of her. Naturally it became clear to me that I couldn't know Florence Harding without becoming well acquainted with Warren. I was initially struck by the way Americans reacted to his death. He was the object of national grief and reverence, and in his gentleness, geniality, and warmth he was even considered Lincoln's equal. As I read about him, it began to dawn on me that possibly these tributes were not entirely undeserved … As I delved further into the Harding archives, I kept finding evidence of a more positive side to his administration.

Another study titled "Reputation Overrides Record: How Warren G. Harding Mistakenly Became the 'Worst' President of the United States" questions whether political biases might be partly responsible for the widespread conventional negative views on Harding. The article shows that modern historians, whether liberal or conservative, have similarly negative views of Harding; it argues that Harding's reputation was "destroyed" by progressive authors in the 1920s-30s, "leaving us a great disparity between scholarly judgment and objective measures of presidential success". Similarly, the 2015 Washington Post article, "If we weren't so obsessed with Warren G. Harding's sex life, we'd realize he was a pretty good president", stated, in part:

Our obsession, past and present, with Harding's sex life has obscured the truth: This man was a good president. Among his more important accomplishments was stabilizing the country and the world after the catastrophic war in Europe, a true Armageddon that left most "civilized" nations in economic, political and social chaos. The United States alone was capable of steadying the world. Harding started by lifting our country out of a sharp postwar depression and then placed the federal government on a budget for the first time — establishing the Office of the Budget (the forerunner of the modern OMB). He addressed severe racial tensions that the war stirred up, in part because of the great migration of African Americans to the North to work in war industries. Harding traveled to Birmingham, Ala., in his first year in office to deliver a courageous civil rights speech. 'Democracy is a lie,' he said, without political equality for black citizens. He also supported a federal anti-lynching law. ... Over time Harding freed hundreds of political prisoners, repairing the severe wounds wrought by the Espionage and Sedition acts of 1917 and 1918. Free speech was the victor.

== Economic policies ==
Harding's detailed attention to federal budgeting, including his creation of the Bureau of the Budget, and lowering of federal spending, have increased the basis for various positive reassessments in recent decades. A 2022 article titled Warren Harding: The US President Who Reduced Federal Spending by Nearly 50% in Just Two Years. stated:

Today, we're going to celebrate the fiscal achievements of Warren Harding. Most notably, as illustrated by this chart based on OMB data, he presided over a period of remarkable spending discipline. Harding also launched very big—and very effective—reductions in tax rates. And his agenda of less government and lower tax rates helped bring about a quick end to a massive economic downturn (unlike the big-government policies of Hoover and Roosevelt, which deepened and lengthened the Great Depression).

A 2021 article in the National Review titled How the Media Destroyed the Reputation of a Great President stated:

One hundred years ago this month, one of our greatest presidents took office. In a moment of national crisis, Warren G. Harding restored the economic health of the United States. Harding was also, for a man of his time, atypically enlightened about the perniciousness of racism, and, contrary to legend, honest. America in 1921 was in a state of crisis... Harding and Congress cut federal spending nearly in half, from 6.5 percent of GDP to 3.5 percent. The top tax rate came down from 73 percent to 25, and the tax base broadened. Unemployment came down to an estimated 2 to 4 percent... Harding was a smashing success in a historically important role as the anti-Wilson: He restored a classically liberal, rights-focused, limited government, and deserves immense credit for the economic boom that kicked off in his first year and continued throughout the rest of the 1920s....

An article by Jim Powell in 2009 titled Not‐So‐Great Depression: Which U.S. president ranks as America's greatest depression fighter? stated:

America's greatest depression fighter was Warren Gamaliel Harding. An Ohio senator when he was elected president in 1920, he followed the much praised Woodrow Wilson— who had brought America into World War I, built up huge federal bureaucracies, imprisoned dissenters, and incurred $25 billion of debt... One of Harding's campaign slogans was "less government in business," and it served him well. Harding embraced the advice of Treasury Secretary Andrew Mellon and called for tax cuts in his first message to Congress on April 12, 1921. The highest taxes, on corporate revenues and "excess" profits, were to be cut. Personal income taxes were to be left as is, with a top rate of 8 percent of incomes above $4,000.

Economist David Kuehn has questioned the claims of Powell and other Austrian School economists on Harding, noting many of the measures taken by him had already started under President Wilson.

== See also ==
- Historical rankings of presidents of the United States
- Presidency of Warren G. Harding
