= Historical reputation of Thomas Jefferson =

The following article covers the historiography and general reputation of Thomas Jefferson, Founding Father and 3rd president of the United States.

== Overview ==
Thomas Jefferson has been described as an icon of individual liberty, democracy, and republicanism, hailed as the author of the Declaration of Independence, an architect of the American Revolution, and a renaissance man who promoted science and scholarship. The participatory democracy and expanded suffrage he championed defined his era and became a standard for later generations. Jon Meacham opined that Jefferson was the most influential figure of the democratic republic in its first half-century, succeeded by presidential adherents James Madison, James Monroe, Andrew Jackson, and Martin Van Buren. Jefferson is recognized for having written more than 18,000 letters of political and philosophical substance during his life, which Francis D. Cogliano describes as "a documentary legacy … unprecedented in American history in its size and breadth."

Jefferson's reputation declined during the American Civil War due to his support of states' rights. In the late 19th century, his legacy was widely criticized; conservatives felt that his democratic philosophy had led to that era's populist movement, while Progressives sought a more activist federal government than Jefferson's philosophy allowed. Both groups saw Alexander Hamilton as vindicated by history, rather than Jefferson, and President Woodrow Wilson even described Jefferson as "though a great man, not a great American".

In the 1930s, Jefferson was held in higher esteem; President Franklin D. Roosevelt (1933–1945) and New Deal Democrats celebrated his struggles for "the common man" and reclaimed him as their party's founder. Jefferson became a symbol of American democracy in the incipient Cold War, and the 1940s and 1950s saw the zenith of his popular reputation. Following the civil rights movement of the 1950s and 1960s, Jefferson's slaveholding came under new scrutiny, particularly after DNA testing in the late 1990s supported allegations that he had fathered multiple children with Sally Hemings.

Noting the huge output of scholarly books on Jefferson in recent years, historian Gordon S. Wood summarizes the raging debates about Jefferson's stature: "Although many historians and others are embarrassed about his contradictions and have sought to knock him off the democratic pedestal … his position, though shaky, still seems secure."

The Siena Research Institute poll of presidential scholars, begun in 1982, has consistently ranked Jefferson as one of the five best U.S. presidents, and a 2015 Brookings Institution poll of American Political Science Association members ranked him as the fifth-greatest president.

== Louisiana Purchase ==
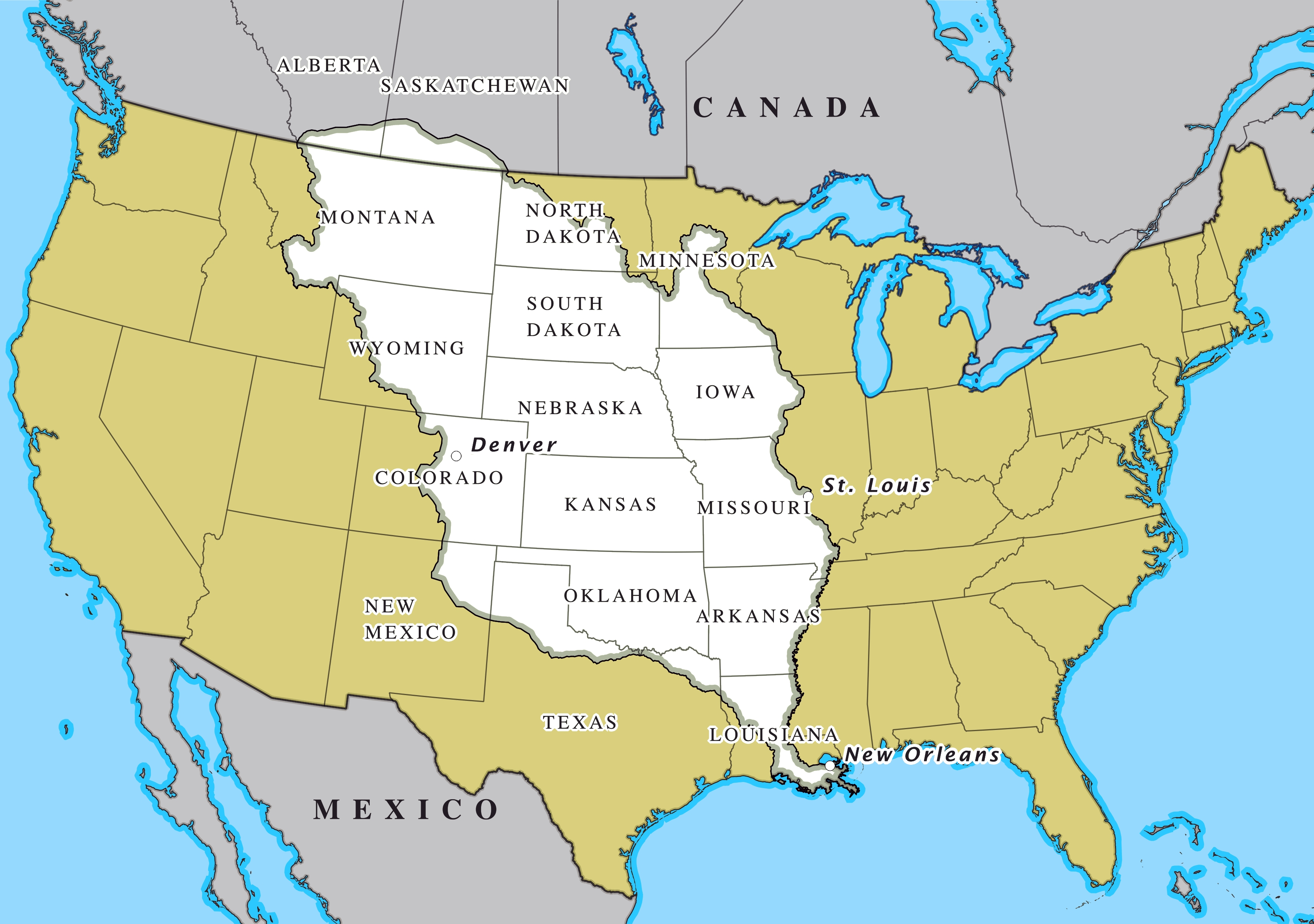
The territory acquired from the Louisiana Purchase, superimposed on a map of the contiguous United States.

Jefferson positioned himself as a strict constructionist regarding the United States Constitution, a view which argued for a strict, exact-word interpretation of the law; this position, however, meant that purchasing Louisiana from France (as Jefferson did) would be potentially unconstitutional, and inspire opposition to it. He justified the purchase by saying "it is the case of a guardian, investing the money of his ward in purchasing an important adjacent territory; & saying to him when of age, I did this for your good." Before the ratification of the treaty, Jefferson ultimately came to the conclusion that the purchase was to protect the citizens of the United States, therefore making it constitutional.

Historians have differed in their assessments regarding the constitutional implications of the sale. Henry Adams and other historians have argued that Jefferson acted hypocritically with the Louisiana Purchase, by stretching the intent of that document to justify his purchase. Although the American purchase of the Louisiana territory was a broadly popular decision, it was not accomplished without domestic opposition; Jefferson's philosophical consistency was in question, and many people believed he and others, including James Madison, were doing something they surely would have argued against with Alexander Hamilton. The Federalists strongly opposed the purchase, because of the cost involved, their belief that France would not have been able to resist U.S. and British encroachment into Louisiana, and Jefferson's perceived hypocrisy.

Other historians counter the above arguments regarding Jefferson's alleged hypocrisy by asserting that countries change their borders in two ways: (1) conquest, or (2) an agreement between nations, otherwise known as a treaty; the Louisiana Purchase was the latter, a treaty. Article II, Section 2 of the Constitution specifically grants the president the power to negotiate treaties, which is what Jefferson did.

Nevertheless, historians typically consider the Louisiana Purchase a major accomplishment for Jefferson's administration. Frederick Jackson Turner called the purchase the most formative event in American history.

== Embargo Act of 1807 ==
Most historians consider Jefferson's embargo to have been ineffective and harmful to American interests. Even the top officials of the Jefferson administration viewed the embargo as a flawed policy, but they saw it as preferable to war. Appleby describes the strategy as Jefferson's "least effective policy", and Joseph Ellis calls it "an unadulterated calamity". Others, however, portray it as an innovative, nonviolent measure which aided France in its war with Britain while preserving American neutrality.

Jefferson believed that the failure of the embargo was due to selfish traders and merchants showing a lack of "republican virtue." He maintained that, had the embargo been widely observed, it would have avoided the War of 1812.

== Views on slavery and equality ==
Scholars remain divided on whether Jefferson truly condemned slavery and how he changed. Francis D. Cogliano traces the development of competing emancipationist then revisionist and finally contextualist interpretations from the 1960s to the present. The emancipationist view, held by the various scholars at the Thomas Jefferson Foundation, Douglas L. Wilson, John Ferling and others, maintains Jefferson was an opponent of slavery all his life, noting that he did what he could within the limited range of options available to him to undermine it, his many attempts at abolition legislation, the manner in which he provided for slaves, and his advocacy of their more humane treatment. (Note: For examples of each historian's view, see Wilson, Douglas L., Thomas Jefferson and the Issue of Character, The Atlantic, November 1992. Finkelman, 1994 "Thomas Jefferson and Antislavery: The Myth Goes On" and Joseph J. Ellis, 1996, American Sphinx: the character of Thomas Jefferson)

One month before the Act Prohibiting Importation of Slaves came into effect, in his annual message to Congress, Jefferson denounced the "violations of human rights." He said:

I congratulate you, fellow-citizens, on the approach of the period at which you may interpose your authority constitutionally, to withdraw the citizens of the United States from all further participation in those violations of human rights which have been so long continued on the unoffending inhabitants of Africa, and which the morality, the reputation, and the best interests of our country, have long been eager to proscribe.

The revisionist view, advanced by Paul Finkelman and others, criticizes him for holding slaves, and for acting contrary to his words. Jefferson never freed most of his slaves, and he remained silent on the issue while he was president. Contextualists such as Joseph J. Ellis emphasize a change in Jefferson's thinking from his emancipationist views before 1783, noting Jefferson's shift toward public passivity and procrastination on policy issues related to slavery. Jefferson seemed to yield to public opinion by 1794 as he laid the groundwork for his first presidential campaign against Adams in 1796.

Historian Henry Wiencek said that Jefferson "rationalized an abomination to the point where an absolute moral reversal was reached and he made slavery fit into America's national enterprise".

=== Declaration of Independence ===
The assertion in the Declaration of Independence that it was "self-evident" that "all men are created equal" inspired women, men, blacks, and whites to pursue equality. Others contend that Jefferson included women as well as men when he wrote that "all men are created equal" and that he believed in women's natural equality as expressed in Notes on the State of Virginia.

Historian Annette Gordon-Reed said that Jefferson's "vision of equality" did not include all people, as it primarily excluded both blacks and women. Jefferson believed that Native peoples could be citizens, as long as they agreed to assimilate into white society. According to her, Jefferson put little effort into obtaining freedom for black slaves, as he did for white colonists from Britain. She also said that Jefferson was doubtful of the intellectual capacity of blacks, compared to whites and also was hesitant to advocate or examine the equality of women.

== See also ==
- Cultural depictions of Thomas Jefferson
- Religious views of Thomas Jefferson
- Thomas Jefferson and education

Other

- Historical rankings of presidents of the United States
