= Robert K. Murray =

American historian

Robert K. Murray (April 9, 1922 – February 9, 2019) was an American professor of history at the Pennsylvania State University for 35 years, best known for The Harding Era (1969), a biography of US President Warren G. Harding, which won a History Book of the Month Club selection, McNight Distinguished Book Award, and Phi Alpha Theta National Book award.

== Background ==
Robert Keith Murray was born on April 9, 1922, in Union City, Indiana. His parents were Darrell Richard and Orpha Alice Michael Murray. He attended public schools in Columbus, Ohio. In 1943, he earned both BA and BS degrees. In 1943, he earned an MA and in 1949 a doctorate in Modern American History from Ohio State University.

== Career ==
During World War II, Murray served as a Signal Intelligence Specialist in Europe. Immediately after the war, he served in the National Security Agency.

Murray began his long academic career as instructor in history at Ohio State University. In 1949, he joined Pennsylvania State University. In 1959, he became full professor of American History. He headed History Department (1959 to 1969). He served as assistant graduate dean (1964 to 1967). He helped develop and plan Penn State's Kern Graduate Center. In 1974, Murray became a Senior Fellow in the Institute for the Arts and Humanities. In 1984, he retired from Penn State after 35 years there.

Murray helped open the Harding Papers to the public (thought burned), based on which he wrote The Harding Era (1969) (see Awards and Works sections, below).

Outside of academics, Murray served as an institutional Peace Corps representative (1961–1963), special consultant to the American Council on Education (1962–1964), member of the National Archives Commission (1971–1976), and referee for the National Endowment for the Humanities.

== Personal life and death ==
On December 7, 1943, Murray married Evelyn Fay Keller (died 2015); they had two daughters and a son.

Beyond Penn State, Murray was a member of the American Historical Association, the Organization of American Historians, the National Education Association, the Pennsylvania Historical Association, and American Association of University Professors.

Murray died aged 96 on February 9, 2019, in Tampa, Florida.

== Awards ==
- 1970:
  - Research Service award from the State of Ohio
  - History Book of the Month Club selection for The Harding Era
  - McNight Distinguished Book Award for The Harding Era
  - Phi Alpha Theta National Book award for The Harding Era
- 1976: History Book of the Month Club selection for 103rd Ballot
- 1978: Distinguished Alumnus of Ohio State
- 1979: Life Membership in the National Speliological Society for Trapped
- 1984: Honorary Life Member, Organization of American Historians

== Works ==
Murray wrote or co-wrote more than six books, more than 30 articles, and many book chapters and book reviews.

Books:

- Public Opinion and the American Red Cross (1950)
- Red Scare: A Study in National Hysteria, 1919–1920 (1955)
- The Harding Era: Warren G. Harding and His Administration (1969)
- The Politics of Normalcy: Governmental Theory and Practice in the Harding-Coolidge Era (1973)
- The 103rd Ballot: Democrats and the Disaster in Madison Square Garden (1976)
- Trapped!: The Story of Floyd Collins (1979)
- Greatness in the White House (1989)
