= Historical rankings of heads of government =

The following articles describe various historical rankings of heads of government for different countries.

- Historical rankings of presidents of the United States
- Historical rankings of prime ministers of Australia
- Historical rankings of prime ministers of Canada
- Historical rankings of prime ministers of the Netherlands
- Historical rankings of prime ministers of the United Kingdom
- Historical rankings of chancellors of Germany

== See also ==
- List of longest-reigning monarchs
- United States presidential approval rating
