= The Greatest Canadian =

2004 television series

- The Greatest Canadian logo
- Genre: Documentary
- Developed by: Canadian Broadcasting Corporation
- Written by: Gary Pearson
- Directed by: Guy O'Sullivan
- Country of origin: Canada
- No. of episodes: 13

Original release
- Release: 17 October 2004

The Greatest Canadian is a 2004 television series consisting of 13 episodes produced by the Canadian Broadcasting Corporation (CBC) to identify one greatest Canadian of all time, according to those who watched and participated in the program.

The series two-hour debut on 17 October 2004 garnered more than one million viewers, with approximately 500,000 to 700,000 viewers per episode thereafter. The initial nomination phase received more than 10,000 names submitted for consideration. The second phase of the process concluded on 28 November at midnight and the following evening the winner from more than 1.2 million votes was revealed to be Tommy Douglas.

The series was inspired by the BBC production the Great Britons and has a spiritual sequel, The Greatest Canadian Invention.

The Greatest Canadian experienced strong initial ratings, some fall-off during its run, and a partial rebound for the finale. The series was credited with bringing the CBC public "buzz" and a younger demographic. Conversely the series was critiqued, by University of Calgary communication professors Bart Beaty and Rebecca Sullivan in their book Canadian Television Today, as middlebrow "nationalist pandering."

== Selection process ==
The "Greatest Canadian" was chosen through a two-step voting process. The first phase beginning on 5 April 2004, involved the collection of data (nominees for consideration) through polls conducted by mail, phone and the internet. Of these nominees the bottom 40 of 50 individuals, in order of popularity, were revealed during the first episode in October.

The eligibility criteria as outlined by the CBC was broad:

Born in what is now Canada, or born elsewhere but lived here and made a significant contribution to this country - real (no fictional characters or animals) - an individual (no pairs, or groups).

To prevent bias during the second round of voting; the top ten nominees, also revealed during the first episode, were presented alphabetically rather than by order of first round popularity. This phase was accompanied by a series of hour-long feature documentaries, where 10 Canadian celebrities acting as advocates each presented their case for The Greatest Canadian. Viewers then submitted votes over the next six weeks supporting their favourite finalists. Importantly, there was no overall limit on the number of times any listener could call in and cast a vote, nor was voting restricted to Canadians.

== Top 10 ==
On 17 October 2004 the top 10 nominees were revealed at the end of the first episode in alphabetical order. The winner and all finalists were announced by popularity on 28 November and 29 in a three-hour two part series conclusion.

Rank	Image	Name	Date of birth	Date of death	Notability	Birthplace	Advocate	Aired
10		Wayne Gretzky	1961		Hockey player, holder of numerous NHL records	Brantford, Ontario	Deborah Grey	20 October
9		Alexander Graham Bell	1847	1922	Scientist, inventor, founder of the Bell Telephone Company	Edinburgh, Scotland	Evan Solomon	15 November
8		Sir John A. Macdonald	1815	1891	First Prime Minister of Canada	Glasgow, Scotland	Charlotte Gray	27 October
7		Don Cherry	1934		Hockey Commentator	Kingston, Ontario	Bret Hart	25 October
6		Lester B. Pearson	1897	1972	Fourteenth Prime Minister of Canada, United Nations General Assembly President, Nobel Peace Prize Laureate	Toronto, Ontario	Paul Gross	10 November
5		David Suzuki	1936		Environmentalist	Vancouver, British Columbia	Melissa Auf der Maur	17 November
4		Sir Frederick Banting	1891	1941	Medical scientist, co-discoverer of insulin, winner of the Nobel Prize in Physiology or Medicine	Alliston, Ontario	Mary Walsh	8 November
3		Pierre Trudeau	1919	2000	Fifteenth Prime Minister of Canada	Montreal, Quebec	Rex Murphy	22 November
2		Terry Fox	1958	1981	Athlete, activist, humanitarian	Winnipeg, Manitoba	Sook-Yin Lee	3 November
1		Tommy Douglas	1904	1986	Father of Medicare, Premier of Saskatchewan	Falkirk, Scotland	George Stroumboulopoulos	18 October

== Top 50 ==
More than 10,000 names were submitted for consideration with the top 100 individuals being revealed online accompanied with a short biography. Of the 100 only the top 50 nominees were featured during the televised broadcast.

At least three* members of the nominees as the direct result of an active mass-mailing campaign among that individual's loyal and well-organized followers. Kin Canada founder Harold A. Rogers, DJ Hal Anderson, and Baháʼí activist Mary Maxwell all benefitted from a grassroots campaign to get their names included in the nominees list. CBC openly admitted this during the broadcast, recognizing that these three esoteric individuals are probably quite unknown to the general public.

Critics have complained there were only six women and three nonwhites in the top 50, that French Canadian participation was very low and that a large number of modern pop culture celebrities made the list like; Bret Hart, Mike Myers, John Candy, Jim Carrey and Avril Lavigne. A recency bias in favour of contemporary icons may be reflective of a youthful voting demographic, as the production was family oriented, or there was unwillingness or confusion distinguishing modern popularity with national historic significance among the participants of all ages. In particular, Don Cherry's inclusion in the top 10 upset many Canadians, especially considering it forced out figures they believe more worthy like Louis Riel and Jean Vanier.

Rank	Name	Notability
11	Louis Riel	Métis leader
12	Jean Vanier	humanitarian, founder of L'Arche, author
13	Stompin' Tom Connors	singer, songwriter
14	Neil Young	singer, guitarist, organist
15	Peter Gzowski	broadcaster, writer, reporter
16	Roméo Dallaire	general, humanitarian, author
17	Stephen Lewis	politician, broadcaster, diplomat
18	Shania Twain	singer, songwriter
19	Bobby Orr	ice hockey player
20	Mike Myers	actor, comedian, writer, producer
21	Unknown Soldier	soldiers
22	Harold A. Rogers *	founder of Kin Canada
23	Maurice Richard	ice hockey player
24	Sir Arthur Currie	commander, general
25	Nellie McClung	feminist, social activist
26	Dr. Norman Bethune	physician, medical innovator, humanitarian
27	Céline Dion	vocalist, entertainer
28	Sir Isaac Brock	major-general
29	Jim Carrey	film actor, comedian, writer, producer
30	Rick Hansen	paraplegic athlete, humanitarian
31	Pierre Berton	author, television personality
32	Michael J. Fox	actor, activist
33	Gordon Lightfoot	folk singer, composer, lyricist
34	Hal Anderson *	broadcaster
35	Laura Secord	national heroine
36	Ernie Coombs	children's entertainer
37	Tecumseh	indigenous leader
38	Mario Lemieux	ice hockey player
39	Bret Hart	professional wrestler
40	Avril Lavigne	singer, songwriter
41	John Candy	comedian, actor
42	Sir Sandford Fleming	engineer, inventor
43	Sir Wilfrid Laurier	prime minister
44	Mary Maxwell *	Baháʼí Faith follower
45	Jean Chrétien	prime minister
46	Leonard Cohen	poet, novelist, folk singer, songwriter
47	John Diefenbaker	prime minister
48	Billy Bishop	WW1 flying ace
49	William Lyon Mackenzie King	prime minister
50	Rick Mercer	comedian, broadcasting personality

== Other editions ==
Other countries have produced similar shows based on the format originated by the BBC. The Tomb of the Unknown Soldier and Alexander Graham Bell were also featured on the 100 Greatest Britons list. A two-hour spin-off series called The Greatest Canadian Invention aired in 2007 with Insulin as the winner.

== See also ==
- Canada: A People's History
- Canadian Newsmaker of the Year
- Heritage Minutes
- List of Canadian awards
- List of Canadian Victoria Cross recipients
- List of companions of the Order of Canada
- List of inductees of Canada's Walk of Fame
- Persons of National Historic Significance
- Historical rankings of prime ministers of Canada
