= List of prime ministers of Canada =

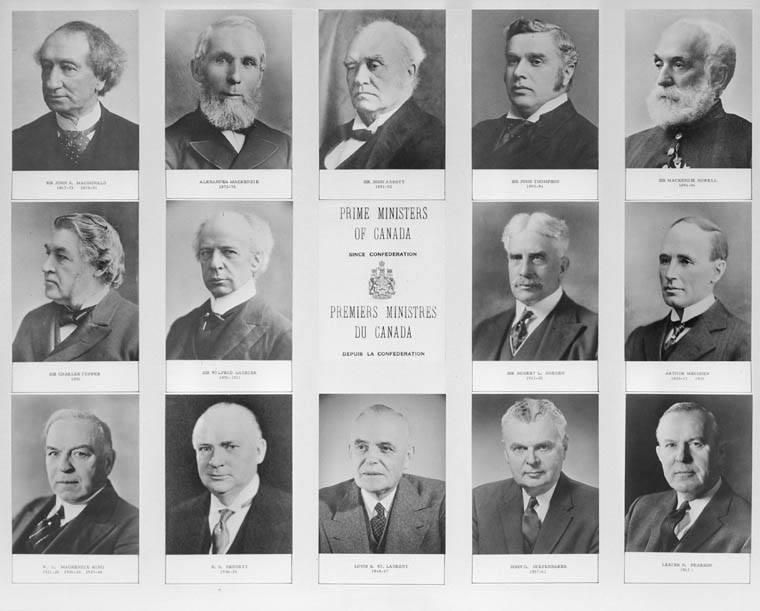
Canada's prime ministers during its first century

The prime minister of Canada is the official who serves as the primary minister of the Crown, chair of the Cabinet, and thus head of government of Canada. Twenty-four people (twenty-three men and one woman) have served as prime minister. Officially, the prime minister is appointed by the governor general of Canada, but by constitutional convention, the prime minister must have the confidence of the elected House of Commons. Normally, this is the leader of the party caucus with the greatest number of seats in the house. However, in a minority parliament the leader of an opposition party may be asked to form a government if the incumbent government resigns and the governor general is persuaded that they have the confidence of the House.

By constitutional convention, a prime minister holds a seat in parliament and, since the early 20th century, this has more specifically meant the House of Commons.

The 24th and current prime minister is Mark Carney, who assumed office on 14 March 2025.

== Model ==
The office is not outlined in any of the documents that constitute the written portion of the Constitution of Canada; executive authority is formally vested in the sovereign and exercised on the sovereign's behalf by the governor general. The prime ministership is part of Canada's constitutional convention tradition. The office was modelled after that which existed in the United Kingdom at the time of Confederation. John A. Macdonald was commissioned by the Viscount Monck on 24 May 1867 to form the first government of the Canadian Confederation. On 1 July 1867, the first ministry assumed office.

== Term ==
When a prime minister takes office, their term is determined by the date when they are sworn in as prime minister; or, if they do not take an oath as prime minister, the date they were sworn into another portfolio, as an oath of office as prime minister is not required. However, since 1957, all incoming prime ministers have sworn an oath as prime minister.

Before 1920, prime ministers' resignations were accepted immediately by the governor general, and the last day of their ministry was their date of resignation (or death). Since 1920, the outgoing prime minister has only formally resigned when the new government is ready to be formed. The Interpretation Act of 1967 states that "where an appointment is made effective or terminates on a specified day, that appointment is considered to be effective or to terminate after the end of the previous day". Thus, although the outgoing prime minister formally resigns only hours before the incoming ministry swears their oaths, on the same day, the ministries are effectively changed at midnight the night before. Some sources, including the Parliament of Canada, apply this convention as far back as 1917. Two prime ministers have died in office: John A. Macdonald (1867–1873, 1878–1891) and John Thompson (1892–1894), both of natural causes. All others have resigned, either after losing an election or upon retirement.

== Prime ministers ==
Canadian custom is to count by the individuals who were prime minister, not by terms. Since Confederation, 24 prime ministers have been called upon by the governor general to form 30 Canadian ministries.

Abbreviation key:	No.: Incumbent number, Min.: Ministry, Refs: References
Colour key:	Liberal Party of Canada Historical Conservative parties (including Liberal-Conservative, Conservative (Historical), Unionist, National Liberal and Conservative, Progressive Conservative) Conservative Party of Canada
Provinces key:	AB: Alberta, BC: British Columbia, MB: Manitoba, NS: Nova Scotia, ON: Ontario, QC: Quebec, SK: Saskatchewan

No.	Portrait	Name (Birth–Death)	Term of office	Electoral mandates (Assembly)	Political party	Parliamentary seat	Cabinet	Ref.
1^{(1 of 2)}		John A. Macdonald (1815–1891)	1 July 1867 – 5 November 1873	Title created (caretaker government) 1867 election (1st Parl.) 1872 election (2nd Parl.)	Liberal–Conservative	MP for Kingston, ON	1st	
1^{(1 of 2)}		John A. Macdonald (1815–1891)	Minister of Justice; Integration of Rupert's Land and the North-Western Territory into Canada; Manitoba Act; Red River Rebellion; British Columbia and Prince Edward Island join Confederation; Creation of the North-West Mounted Police; Resigned over Pacific Scandal.					
2		Alexander Mackenzie (1822–1892)	7 November 1873 – 8 October 1878	Appointment (2nd Parl.) 1874 election (3rd Parl.)	Liberal (Ldr. 1873)	MP for Lambton, ON	2nd	
2		Alexander Mackenzie (1822–1892)	Appointed as a result of the Pacific Scandal; Creation of the Supreme Court; Passage of the Indian Act; Establishment of the Royal Military College; Creation of the office of the Auditor General.					
1^{(2 of 2)}		John A. Macdonald (1815–1891)	17 October 1878 – 6 June 1891	1878 election (4th Parl.) 1882 election (5th Parl.) 1887 election (6th Parl.) 1891 election (7th Parl.)	Liberal–Conservative	MP for Victoria, BC (1878–1882) MP for Carleton, ON (1882–1887) MP for Kingston, ON (1887–1891)	3rd	
1^{(2 of 2)}		John A. Macdonald (1815–1891)	National Policy; Railway to the Pacific; North-West Rebellion; Introduction of Chinese Head Tax; Hanging of Louis Riel; Establishment of Residential School System; Imposed Peasant Farm Policy. Died in office (stroke).					
3		John Abbott (1821–1893)	16 June 1891 – 24 November 1892	Appointment (7th Parl.)	Liberal–Conservative	Senator for Inkerman, Quebec	4th	
3		John Abbott (1821–1893)	First prime minister born in what would become Canada; first of only two prime ministers to serve while in the Senate; Minister without Portfolio; succeeded on Macdonald's death due to objections to the Catholic John Thompson; in ill health; retired.					
4		John Sparrow David Thompson (1845–1894)	5 December 1892 – 12 December 1894	Appointment (7th Parl.)	Liberal–Conservative	MP for Antigonish, NS	5th	
4		John Sparrow David Thompson (1845–1894)	Minister of Justice; first Catholic prime minister; Manitoba Schools Question; died in office (heart attack).					
5		Mackenzie Bowell (1823–1917)	21 December 1894 – 27 April 1896	Appointment (7th Parl.)	Conservative	Senator for Ontario	6th	
5		Mackenzie Bowell (1823–1917)	Minister of Customs; Minister of Militia and Defence; Manitoba Schools Question; last prime minister to serve while in the Senate and last prime minister not to be born in Canada or pre-Canada until Turner.					
6		Charles Tupper (1821–1915)	1 May 1896 – 8 July 1896	Appointment (caretaker government)	Conservative	Did not hold a seat in legislature	7th	
6		Charles Tupper (1821–1915)	Minister of Customs, Minister of Railways and Canals; Oldest Canadian PM to take office. Longest life of any Canadian prime minister (as of 2026), at 94 years, four months. Appointed prime minister while Parliament was dissolved for the 1896 election; did not hold a seat in parliament while prime minister, but he was MP for Cape Breton, NS immediately before and after the 1896 election. Despite his party's defeat in the election, attempted to remain in office until dismissed by Governor General Lord Aberdeen.					
7		Wilfrid Laurier (1841–1919)	11 July 1896 – 6 October 1911	1896 election (8th Parl.) 1900 election (9th Parl.) 1904 election (10th Parl.) 1908 election (11th Parl.)	Liberal (Ldr. 1887)	MP for Quebec East, QC	8th	
7		Wilfrid Laurier (1841–1919)	Manitoba Schools Question; Boer War; Alberta and Saskatchewan created; Creation of the Royal Canadian Navy; Reciprocity with the US; Department of External Affairs established; first French Canadian prime minister; longest single term for a prime minister.					
8		Robert Borden (1854–1937)	10 October 1911 – 10 July 1920	1911 election (12th Parl.) 1917 election (13th Parl.)	Conservative (Ldr. 1901)	MP for Halifax, NS (1911–1917) MP for Kings, NS (1917–1920)	9th (1911–17) 10th (1917–20)	
8		Robert Borden (1854–1937)	First World War; Military Service Act; Conscription Crisis of 1917; Union government; National Research Council; Introduction of income tax; Nickle Resolution; Women's suffrage; Suppression of Winnipeg General Strike; Canada sits at the Paris Peace Conference, signs the Treaty of Versailles and joins the League of Nations; last Canadian Prime Minister to be knighted.					
9^{(1 of 2)}		Arthur Meighen (1874–1960)	10 July 1920 – 29 December 1921	Appointment (13th Parl.)	Conservative (Ldr. 1920)	MP for Portage la Prairie, MB	11th	
9^{(1 of 2)}		Arthur Meighen (1874–1960)	Solicitor General of Canada, Minister of Mines, Secretary of State for Canada, Minister of the Interior, Superintendent Indian Affairs; Grand Trunk Railway placed under control of Canadian National Railways.					
10^{(1 of 3)}		William Lyon Mackenzie King (1874–1950)	29 December 1921 – 28 June 1926	1921 election (14th Parl.) 1925 election (15th Parl.)	Liberal (Ldr. 1919)	MP for York North, ON (1921–1925) MP for Prince Albert, SK (1925–1926)	12th	^{[LS]}
10^{(1 of 3)}		William Lyon Mackenzie King (1874–1950)	Minister of Labour; Chanak Crisis; lower tariffs; reinstated Crowsnest Pass Agreement; 1923 Imperial Conference; Halibut Treaty; Continued after 1925 with third party Progressive support until resigning after his request for an election was refused by Governor General Lord Byng.					
9^{(2 of 2)}		Arthur Meighen (1874–1960)	29 June 1926 – 25 September 1926	Appointment (15th Parl.)	Conservative (Ldr. 1920)	MP for Portage la Prairie, MB	13th	
9^{(2 of 2)}		Arthur Meighen (1874–1960)	Appointed as a result of the King–Byng Affair. Circumvented required ministerial by-elections by appointing "acting ministers". Defeated days later on a motion of no confidence, so almost all of his 2nd term was during the 1926 election.					
10^{(2 of 3)}		William Lyon Mackenzie King (1874–1950)	25 September 1926 – 7 August 1930	1926 election (16th Parl.)	Liberal (Ldr. 1919)	MP for Prince Albert, SK	14th	
10^{(2 of 3)}		William Lyon Mackenzie King (1874–1950)	Balfour Declaration; Introduction of old age pensions; first Canadian envoys with full diplomatic status sent to foreign countries (USA, France, Japan); Great Depression.					
11		R. B. Bennett (1870–1947)	7 August 1930 – 23 October 1935	1930 election (17th Parl.)	Conservative (Ldr. 1927)	MP for Calgary West, AB	15th	
11		R. B. Bennett (1870–1947)	Minister of Justice, Minister of Finance; Great Depression; Imperial Preference; Statute of Westminster; Canadian Radio Broadcasting Commission; Canadian Wheat Board; Creation of the Bank of Canada.					
10^{(3 of 3)}		William Lyon Mackenzie King (1874–1950)	23 October 1935 – 15 November 1948	1935 election (18th Parl.) 1940 election (19th Parl.) 1945 election (20th Parl.)	Liberal (Ldr. 1919)	MP for Prince Albert, SK (1935–1945) MP for Glengarry, ON (1945–1948)	16th	^{[LS]}
10^{(3 of 3)}		William Lyon Mackenzie King (1874–1950)	Creation of the Canadian Broadcasting Corporation; National Film Board of Canada; Unemployment Insurance Act of 1940; Nationalization of the Bank of Canada; Second World War; Japanese Canadian internment; Conscription Crisis of 1944; Canada's entry into the United Nations; Trans-Canada Airlines; Gouzenko Affair. Longest cumulative time serving as prime minister; only prime minister to serve three non-consecutive terms.					
12		Louis St. Laurent (1882–1973)	15 November 1948 – 21 June 1957	Appointment (20th Parl.) 1949 election (21st Parl.) 1953 election (22nd Parl.)	Liberal (Ldr. 1948)	MP for Quebec East, QC	17th	
12		Louis St. Laurent (1882–1973)	Minister of Justice, Secretary of State for External Affairs; Dominion of Newfoundland joins Confederation; right of appeal to Judicial Committee of the Privy Council ended; Canada's entrance into NATO; Korean War; Suez Crisis; Creation of the United Nations Emergency Force; London Declaration; Newfoundland Act; Equalization; Trans-Canada Highway; St. Lawrence Seaway; Trans-Canada Pipeline; Pipeline Debate.					
13		John Diefenbaker (1895–1979)	21 June 1957 – 22 April 1963	1957 election (23rd Parl.) 1958 election (24th Parl.) 1962 election (25th Parl.)	Progressive Conservative (Ldr. 1956)	MP for Prince Albert, SK	18th	
13		John Diefenbaker (1895–1979)	Avro Arrow cancellation; Coyne Affair; Cuban Missile Crisis; NORAD; Establishment of Board of Broadcast Governors; Canadian Bill of Rights; Allowed status aboriginals to vote in federal elections 1960; Alouette 1 satellite programme. Divisions within the government over the Bomarc missile program and whether to arm them with American nuclear weapons resulted in a successful motion of no-confidence.					
14		Lester B. Pearson (1897–1972)	22 April 1963 – 20 April 1968	1963 election (26th Parl.) 1965 election (27th Parl.)	Liberal (Ldr. 1958)	MP for Algoma East, ON	19th	
14		Lester B. Pearson (1897–1972)	Secretary of State for External Affairs; Bomarc missile program; Creation of a national system of universal healthcare; Canada Pension Plan; Canada Student Loans; Creation of a new Canadian flag; Auto Pact; Rejection of troop deployment to Vietnam; Royal Commission on Bilingualism and Biculturalism; Unification of the Armed Forces; Canadian Centennial Celebrations.					
15^{(1 of 2)}		Pierre Trudeau (1919–2000)	20 April 1968 – 4 June 1979	Appointment (27th Parl.) 1968 election (28th Parl.) 1972 election (29th Parl.) 1974 election (30th Parl.)	Liberal (Ldr. 1968)	MP for Mount Royal, QC	20th	^{[IA]}
15^{(1 of 2)}		Pierre Trudeau (1919–2000)	Minister of Justice; "Trudeaumania"; "Just Society"; decriminalizing homosexuality and legalizing abortion; October Crisis and use of the War Measures Act; Official Languages Act; Establishment of relations with Communist China; Victoria Charter; Creation of Petro-Canada; Membership in the G7; Metrication of Canada; National Housing Act amendments; inflation and eventual state intervention; Creation of Via Rail.					
16		Joe Clark (b. 1939)	4 June 1979 – 3 March 1980	1979 election (31st Parl.)	Progressive Conservative (Ldr. 1976)	MP for Yellowhead, AB	21st	^{[IA]}
16		Joe Clark (b. 1939)	Youngest Canadian PM; Freedom of Information Act; Canadian Caper; defeated in a motion of no confidence on first budget. First prime minister born in Western Canada.					
15^{(2 of 2)}		Pierre Trudeau (1919–2000)	3 March 1980 – 30 June 1984	1980 election (32nd Parl.)	Liberal (Ldr. 1968)	MP for Mount Royal, QC	22nd	^{[IA]}
15^{(2 of 2)}		Pierre Trudeau (1919–2000)	1980 Quebec referendum; Access to Information Act; Patriation of the Canadian Constitution; Montreal Protocol; Canadian Charter of Rights and Freedoms; National Energy Program; Canada Health Act; Western alienation.					
17		John Turner (1929–2020)	30 June 1984 – 17 September 1984	Appointment (32nd Parl.)	Liberal (Ldr. 1984)	Did not hold a seat in legislature	23rd	^{[IA]}
17		John Turner (1929–2020)	Minister of Justice, Minister of Finance; Trudeau Patronage Appointments. Never sat in parliament as prime minister. First prime minister since Bowell not to have been born in Canada.					
18		Brian Mulroney (1939–2024)	17 September 1984 – 25 June 1993	1984 election (33rd Parl.) 1988 election (34th Parl.)	Progressive Conservative (Ldr. 1983)	MP for Manicouagan, QC (1984–1988) MP for Charlevoix, QC (1988–1993)	24th	^{[IA]}
18		Brian Mulroney (1939–2024)	Cancellation of the National Energy Program; Meech Lake Accord; Petro-Canada privatization; Canada-US Free Trade Agreement; Introduction of the Goods and Services Tax; Charlottetown Accord; Sanctions against South Africa; Acid Rain treaty; Gulf War; Oka Crisis; Emergencies Act; Environmental Protection Act; Privatization of Air Canada, North American Free Trade Agreement; Nunavut Land Claims Agreement; Airbus affair. Resigned amidst poor opinion polling.					
19		Kim Campbell (b. 1947)	25 June 1993 – 4 November 1993	Appointment (34th Parl.)	Progressive Conservative (Ldr. 1993)	MP for Vancouver Centre, BC	25th	^{[IA]}
19		Kim Campbell (b. 1947)	Minister of Justice, Minister of Veterans Affairs, Minister of National Defence, Minister of Intergovernmental Affairs; only female prime minister of Canada. Defeated and lost her seat in 1993 election.					
20		Jean Chrétien (b. 1934)	4 November 1993 – 12 December 2003	1993 election (35th Parl.) 1997 election (36th Parl.) 2000 election (37th Parl.)	Liberal (Ldr. 1990)	MP for Saint-Maurice, QC	26th	^{[IA]}
20		Jean Chrétien (b. 1934)	Minister of Finance, Minister of Indian Affairs, Minister of Energy, Mines and Resources, Minister of Justice and Energy Minister, President of the Treasury Board, Minister of National Revenue, Deputy Prime Minister of Canada; Privatization of Canadian National Railway, Red Book; Harmonized Sales Tax; 1995 Quebec referendum; Clarity Act; Assassination attempt; Kosovo War; 1997 Red River flood; Social Union Framework Agreement; Creation of Nunavut Territory; Youth Criminal Justice Act; Operation Yellow Ribbon; Invasion of Afghanistan; Opposition to the Invasion of Iraq; Sponsorship scandal; Kyoto Protocol; Gomery Inquiry.					
21		Paul Martin (b. 1938)	12 December 2003 – 6 February 2006	Appointment (37th Parl.) 2004 election (38th Parl.)	Liberal (Ldr. 2003)	MP for LaSalle—Émard, QC	27th	^{[IA]}
21		Paul Martin (b. 1938)	Only son of Paul Martin Sr., a prominent politician; served as Minister of Finance; Minority government. Civil Marriage Act; Kelowna Accord; Sponsorship scandal; Gomery inquiry; G20; Atlantic Accord					
22		Stephen Harper (b. 1959)	6 February 2006 – 4 November 2015	2006 election (39th Parl.) 2008 election (40th Parl.) 2011 election (41st Parl.)	Conservative (Ldr. 2004)	MP for Calgary Southwest, AB	28th	^{[IA]}
22		Stephen Harper (b. 1959)	Accountability Act; Softwood Lumber Agreement; Afghanistan Mission; 2006 Ontario terrorism plot; Québécois nation motion; 2008 financial crisis; Coalition crisis; Economic Action Plan; Refusal to bailout Nortel; Afghan detainee issue; Parliamentary contempt; Withdrawal from the Kyoto Protocol; Repeal of the Long-Gun Registry; Operation Mobile; Senate expenses scandal; 2014 Parliament Hill shootings; Anti-terrorism Act, 2015.					
23		Justin Trudeau (b. 1971)	4 November 2015 – 14 March 2025	2015 election (42nd Parl.) 2019 election (43rd Parl.) 2021 election (44th Parl.)	Liberal (Ldr. 2013)	MP for Papineau, QC	29th	
23		Justin Trudeau (b. 1971)	Eldest son of Pierre Trudeau, the 15th prime minister; served as Minister of Intergovernmental Affairs and Youth; resettling of Syrian refugees; Paris Agreement; Canada–Europe Trade Agreement; Trans-Pacific Partnership Agreement; Canada–United States–Mexico Agreement; Canada Child Benefit; legalization of cannabis; Carbon pricing in Canada; Aga Khan affair; extradition case of Meng Wanzhou; negotiated release of Michael Spavor and Michael Kovrig; SNC-Lavalin affair; COVID-19 pandemic; WE Charity scandal; Canada convoy protests and use of the Emergencies Act; $10-a-day childcare; confidence and supply agreement with the NDP; Canadian Dental Care Plan; Pharmacare; humanitarian and military aid to Ukraine; Yaroslav Hunka scandal; 2023–25 Canada–India diplomatic row; 2024–2025 Canadian political crisis; trade war with the United States.					
24		Mark Carney (b. 1965)	14 March 2025 – incumbent	Appointment (44th Parl.) 2025 election (45th Parl.)	Liberal (Ldr. 2025)	MP for Nepean, ON (28 April 2025–present)	30th	
24		Mark Carney (b. 1965)	First prime minister born in any of the territories; first prime minister to have never served in prior elected office; First prime minister who got a formal majority of the Commons without calling another general election; first Governor of the Bank of Canada to serve as prime minister and first to hold a high position in another country (Governor of the Bank of England); trade war with the United States; repeal of the consumer carbon tax; One Canadian Economy Act; establishment of the Major Projects Office; formal recognition of the State of Palestine; improvement of relations with China and India; 2026 World Economic Forum speech.					
^{LS}Party won the election, but prime minister lost own seat^{IA}The Interpretation Act of 1967 states that "where an appointment is made effective or terminates on a specified day, that appointment is considered to be effective or to terminate after the end of the previous day." Under the Act, prime ministers' tenures are therefore credited as having concluded at the end of their last full day in office, although their resignation was received by the governor general on the following day. This provision applies to P. Trudeau in 1979 and 1984, Clark, Turner, Mulroney, Campbell, Chrétien, Martin, Harper, and J. Trudeau.

== See also ==
- Fathers of Confederation
- Historical rankings of prime ministers of Canada
- Leader of the Official Opposition (Canada)
- List of Canadian federal parliaments
- List of Canadian monarchs
- List of prime ministers of Canada by time in office
- List of prime ministers of Canada by religious affiliation
- List of prime ministers of Queen Victoria
- List of prime ministers of Edward VII
- List of prime ministers of George V
- List of prime ministers of Edward VIII
- List of prime ministers of George VI
- List of prime ministers of Elizabeth II
- List of prime ministers of Charles III
- List of joint premiers of the Province of Canada
- Spouse of the prime minister of Canada
