= Hal Anderson =

Canadian radio host (born 1964)

- Born: Lethbridge, Alberta, Canada
- Notable work: B.J and Hal, Wheeler and Hal, Hal Anderson Weekends
- Spouse: Jackie Anderson

Comedy career
- Years active: 1983 - Present
- Medium: Radio

Hal Anderson is a Canadian radio personality. He is best known for his time hosting morning shows on CJOB and CJOB's FM sister station, Power 97.

== Radio career ==
While still studying Communication Arts at Lethbridge Community College, Anderson worked at CJOC in 1984, then took a job a year later as news director at CHAB in Moose Jaw, SK and then oldies station KY58 in Winnipeg.

In 1995, Anderson and B.J. Burke were given the morning show slot on Power 97, replacing Scruff Connors as co-hosts. This new show was billed as "B.J. and Hal". Burke departed the show in 2003. On February 3, 2003, Anderson was joined by Dave Wheeler as his new co-host and the show was re-branded "Wheeler and Hal".

On July 31, 2009, it was announced that Anderson would be moving to Power 97's sister station, CJOB 680 AM, as the morning show host, replacing the outgoing Larry Updike. The last broadcast of the Wheeler and Hal show took place on September 4, 2009.

Anderson was released from his position as morning host with CJOB on May 13, 2014.

On September 27, 2015, Anderson debuted his new radio program on FAB 94.3 FM (CHIQ-FM) in Winnipeg called "Hal Anderson Sundays".

On January 11, 2017, CJOB announced that Anderson will return as host of a new weekend show called Hal Anderson Weekends from 7-10 am starting on February 4, 2017, later moving to afternoons.

On September 27, 2021, CJOB announced that Hal was moving from their afternoon slot back to their 10 a.m. morning talk-show.

== "The Greatest Canadian" Prank ==
Anderson encouraged listeners to vote for him as "The Greatest Canadian" in 2004 as a joke, ultimately placing 34th in the top 50, ahead of William Lyon Mackenzie King, Wilfrid Laurier, Jean Chrétien, Tecumseh and Pamela Anderson.
