= Historical rankings of prime ministers of the Netherlands =

Rankings of the success of prime ministers in the Netherlands

The following is a series of historical rankings of prime ministers of the Netherlands.

== States General of the Netherlands (2002) ==
An opinion poll conducted by the States General of the Netherlands in 2002 had the following results for the best and the worst prime minister of the twentieth century. Of the 225 MPs, 200 responded. Of them, 110 (49 per cent of MPs) handed in a list, the others did not participate for various reasons. The participation by political parties is as follows: Labour Party 57%, People's Party for Freedom and Democracy 44%, Christian Democratic Appeal 43%, Democrats 66 39%, GroenLinks 58%, Socialist Party 43%, Reformed Political Party 20%, Christian Union 44% and the Independent Senate Group 100%.

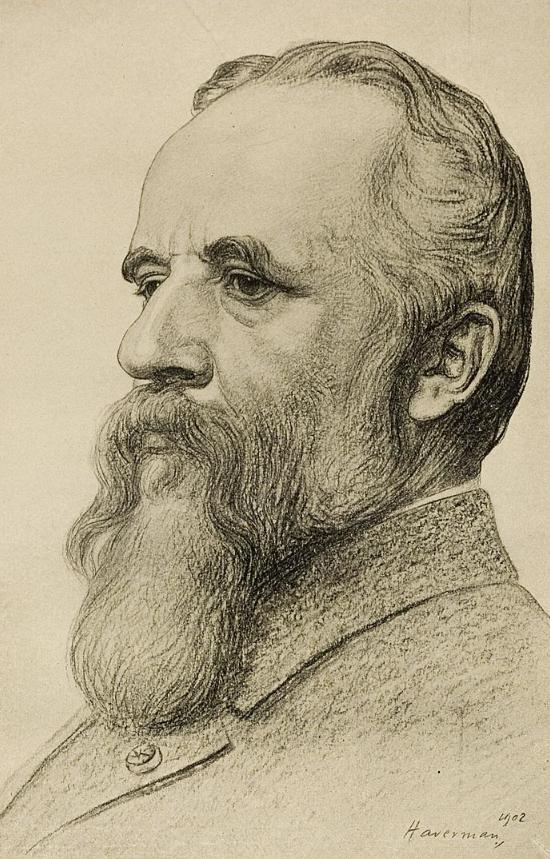
Pieter Cort van der Linden is highly rated for keeping the Netherlands neutral during World War I

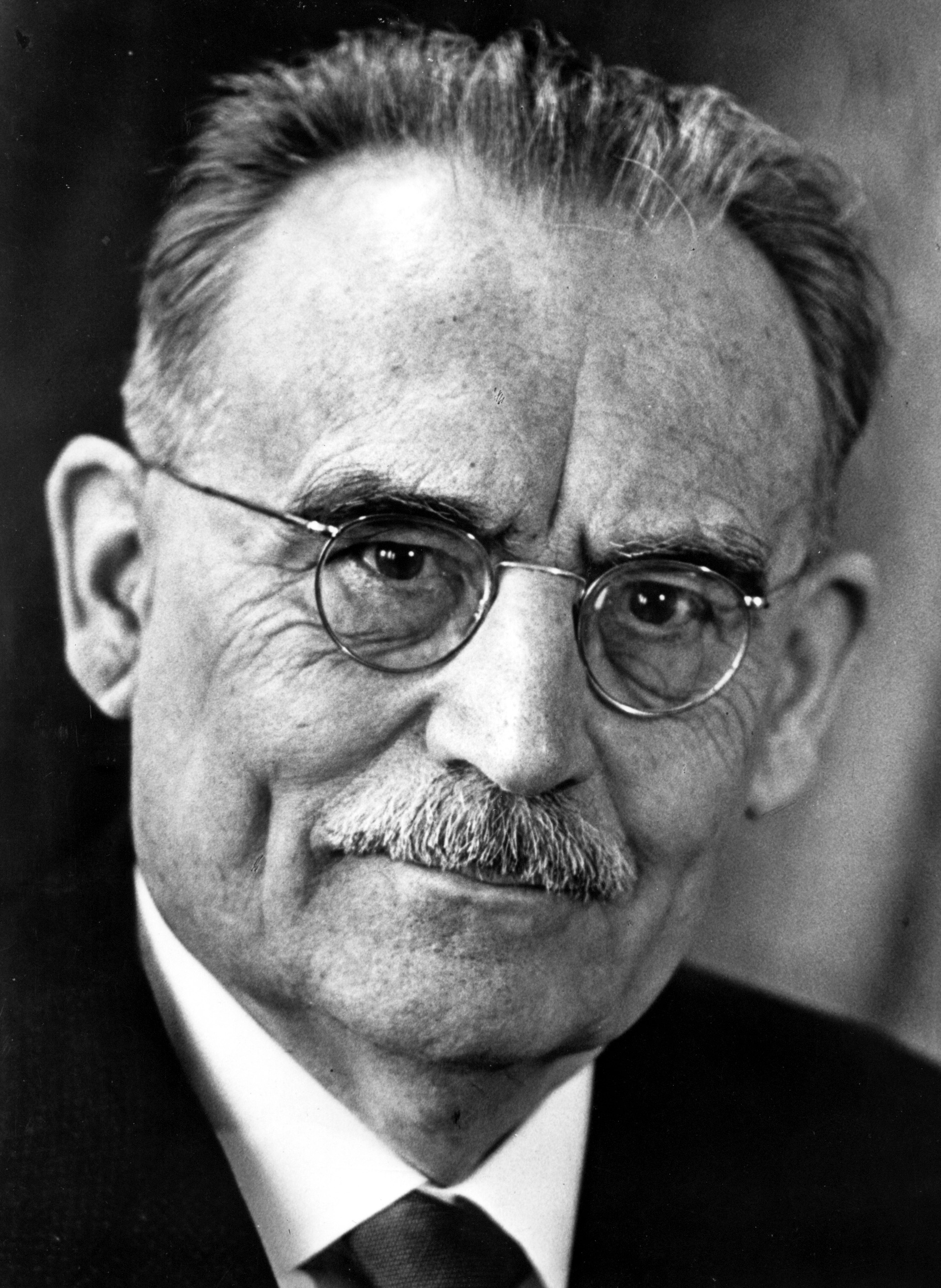
Willem Drees is highly rated for his post-war leadership and social and welfare reforms

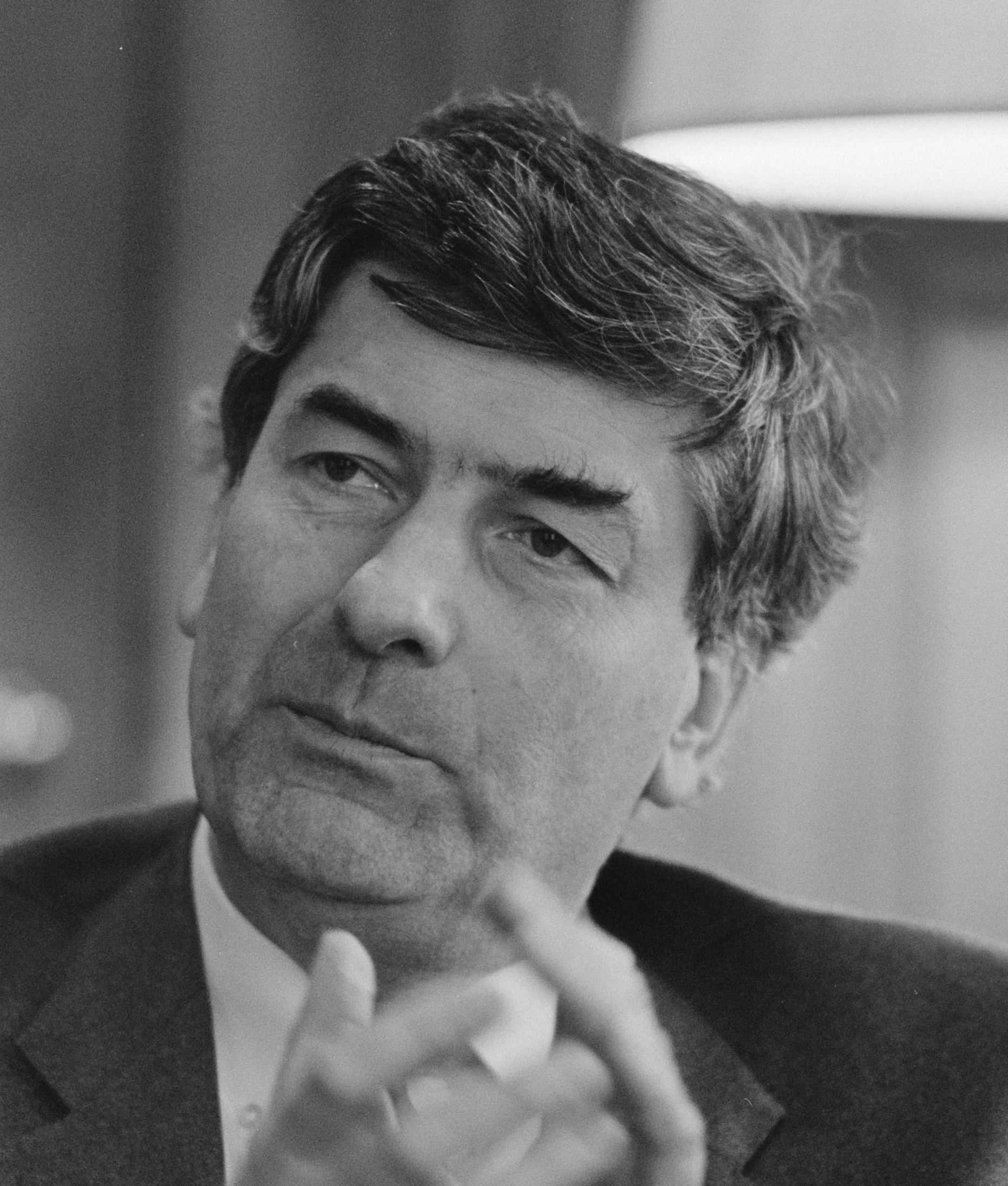
Ruud Lubbers is highly rated for his Cold War leadership and revitalising the economy

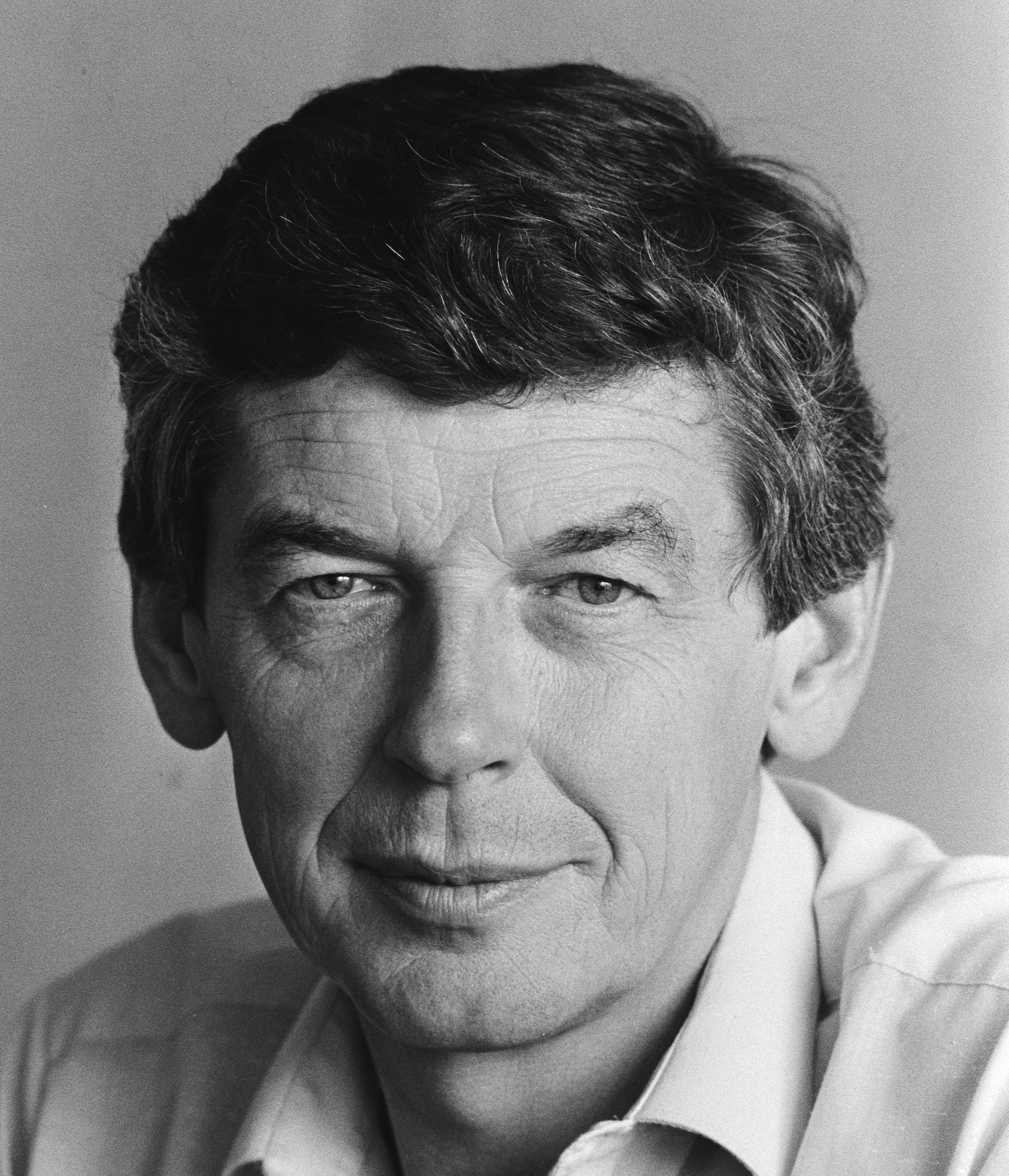
Wim Kok is highly rated for his social reforms and further stimulating the economy

Best ranking	Prime Minister	Term	Political party
1st	Pieter Cort van der Linden	1913–1918	Independent (Liberal)
2nd	Willem Drees	1948–1958	Labour Party
3rd	Joop den Uyl	1973–1977	Labour Party
4th	Ruud Lubbers	1982–1994	Christian Democratic Appeal
5th	Wim Kok	1994–2002	Labour Party
6th	Jelle Zijlstra	1966–1967	Anti-Revolutionary Party
7th	Hendrikus Colijn	1925–1926 / 1933–1939	Anti-Revolutionary Party
	Willem Schermerhorn	1945–1946	Labour Party
8th	Piet de Jong	1967–1971	Catholic People's Party
9th	Charles Ruijs de Beerenbrouck	1918–1925 / 1929–1933	Roman Catholic State Party
	Pieter Sjoerds Gerbrandy	1940–1945	Anti-Revolutionary Party
	Barend Biesheuvel	1971–1973	Anti-Revolutionary Party
	Dries van Agt	1977–1982	Christian Democratic Appeal

Worst ranking	Prime Minister	Term	Political party
1st	Joop den Uyl	1973–1977	Labour Party
2nd	Dirk Jan de Geer	1926–1929 / 1939–1940	Christian Historical Union
3rd	Dries van Agt	1977–1982	Christian Democratic Appeal
4th	Hendrikus Colijn	1925–1926 / 1933–1939	Anti-Revolutionary Party
5th	Ruud Lubbers	1982–1994	Christian Democratic Appeal
6th	Victor Marijnen	1963–1965	Catholic People's Party
	Wim Kok	1994–2002	Labour Party
7th	Pieter Sjoerds Gerbrandy	1940–1945	Anti-Revolutionary Party
	Jan de Quay	1959–1963	Catholic People's Party
8th	Willem Schermerhorn	1945–1946	Labour Party
	Willem Drees	1948–1958	Labour Party
	Jo Cals	1965–1966	Catholic People's Party
	Barend Biesheuvel	1971–1973	Anti-Revolutionary Party

== VPRO (2006) ==
In 2006 Dutch public broadcaster VPRO conducted an opinion poll for the best prime minister after World War II.

Ranking	Prime Minister	Term	Political party
1st	Willem Drees	1948–1958	Labour Party
2nd	Joop den Uyl	1973–1977	Labour Party
3rd	Ruud Lubbers	1982–1994	Christian Democratic Appeal
4th	Wim Kok	1994–2002	Labour Party
5th	Jan Peter Balkenende	2002–2010	Christian Democratic Appeal
6th	Piet de Jong	1967–1971	Catholic People's Party
7th	Dries van Agt	1977–1982	Christian Democratic Appeal
8th	Jelle Zijlstra	1966–1967	Anti-Revolutionary Party
9th	Willem Schermerhorn	1945–1946	Labour Party
10th	Jo Cals	1965–1966	Catholic People's Party
11th	Barend Biesheuvel	1971–1973	Anti-Revolutionary Party
12th	Jan de Quay	1959–1963	Catholic People's Party
13th	Louis Beel	1946–1948; 1958–1959	Catholic People's Party
14th	Victor Marijnen	1963–1965	Catholic People's Party

== NRC Handelsblad (2013) ==
In 2013 newspaper NRC Handelsblad conducted two opinion polls, one with fifty experts and one with their readers. The polls asked respondents to give their opinion on who was the best prime minister since 1900.

Ranking	Prime Minister	Term	Political party
1st	Willem Drees	1948–1958	Labour Party
2nd	Ruud Lubbers	1982–1994	Christian Democratic Appeal
3rd	Pieter Cort van der Linden	1913–1918	Independent (Liberal)
4th	Piet de Jong	1967–1971	Catholic People's Party
5th	Joop den Uyl	1973–1977	Labour Party
6th	Wim Kok	1994–2002	Labour Party
7th	Hendrikus Colijn	1925–1926 / 1933–1939	Anti-Revolutionary Party
8th	Willem Schermerhorn	1945–1946	Labour Party
9th	Abraham Kuyper	1901–1905	Anti-Revolutionary Party
10th	Jan Peter Balkenende	2002–2010	Christian Democratic Appeal

== Maurice de Hond (2013) ==
An opinion poll conducted by Maurice de Hond from the polling site peil.nl had the following results.

Ranking	Prime Minister	Term	Political party
1st	Ruud Lubbers	1982–1994	Christian Democratic Appeal
2nd	Wim Kok	1994–2002	Labour Party
3rd	Willem Drees	1948–1958	Labour Party
4th	Joop den Uyl	1973–1977	Labour Party
5th	Mark Rutte	2010–2024	People's Party for Freedom and Democracy
6th	Jan Peter Balkenende	2002–2010	Christian Democratic Appeal

== I&O Research (2020) ==
An opinion panel conducted by I&O Research with fifty experts had the following results when asked on who was the best prime minister since 1945.

Ranking	Prime Minister	Term	Political party
1	Mark Rutte	2010–2024	People's Party for Freedom and Democracy
2	Wim Kok	1994–2002	Labour Party
3	Ruud Lubbers	1982–1994	Christian Democratic Appeal
4	Joop den Uyl	1973–1977	Labour Party
5	Jan Peter Balkenende	2002–2010	Christian Democratic Appeal
6	Willem Drees	1948–1958	Labour Party

== See also ==
- Prime Minister of the Netherlands
  - List of prime ministers of the Netherlands
  - Religious affiliations of prime ministers of the Netherlands

Other countries

- Historical rankings of prime ministers of Australia
- Historical rankings of prime ministers of Canada
- Historical rankings of chancellors of Germany
- Historical rankings of prime ministers of the United Kingdom
- Historical rankings of presidents of the United States
