= Harold A. Rogers =

Harold Allin Rogers, OC, OBE (January 3, 1899 – September 15, 1994) was the founder of Kin Canada. He is known by Kinsmen and Kinettes as Founder Hal.

== Early life ==
Harold Allin Rogers was born in London, Ontario, on January 3, 1899. Rogers moved to Hamilton, Ontario to work for his father when he was appointed manager of the Standard Sanitary Co. Ltd. Soon after the move, in March 1916, at the age of 17, he enlisted with the 173rd Argyle and Sutherland Battalion. After further training in England, and anxious to get to the front lines, he transferred to the 54th Kootenay Battalion. He fought at Vimy Ridge, Lens, Hill 70 and Ypres, where his leadership skills in the field led to his promotion to the rank of corporal and a recommendation for a commission. Before it could be acted upon, he was gassed at the Paschendaele front (Ypres) and wounded at the Amiens front. After hospitalization in England, he returned home to Hamilton in January 1919.

== Kin Canada ==
Missing the camaraderie of army life, Rogers decided to join the local Rotary Club where his father was a member. Because a once fundamental rule of the Rotarians was to only have one member from each employment classification and as he worked as a salesman in the plumbing industry for his father, his application was rejected. Rogers decided to create a new club and, as a result of his initiative, a small group of like-minded men gathered for a dinner meeting on February 20, 1920, and formed what became known as the Kinsmen Club of Hamilton - Canada's first Kinsmen Club.

== Education ==
Rogers dedication to the concept of education is evidenced in his many years as a trustee on the Forest Hill Board of Education and was recognised by the Ontario Secondary School Teachers' Federation, which named him the first recipient of the Lamp of Learning Award in 1950. The Lamp of Learning is awarded annually to a non-teacher who has contributed to the furtherance of education in the Province of Ontario.

In 1994, The Hal Rogers Endowment the Fund was established in his honour to fund bursaries to post-secondary students. By 2007, 564 awards of $1000 each had been presented.

== Plaque ==
The Ontario Heritage Trust erected a plaque at his birthplace in London, Ontario. The founder of Kinsmen & Kinette Clubs of Canada was born and raised at 324 Dundas Street, directly across from the armouries. Seeking the camaraderie he had experienced in the army during the First World War, "Hal" Rogers began the first Kinsmen Club in Hamilton in 1920. Under his guidance other clubs soon formed, each dedicated to "serving the community's greatest need". Ongoing contributions from women prompted the formation of the Kinettes in 1942. During the Second World War, Rogers chaired the "Milk for Britain" campaign, the first of the clubs' many national projects. By visiting clubs across Canada throughout his life, he inspired countless young Canadians to serve their communities.

== Recognition ==
Rogers died on September 15, 1994, at the age of 95.

Rogers was made an Officer of the Order of the British Empire in 1946 to recognise his efforts as the chairman of Kinsmen's Milk for Britain wartime project which raised about C$2.7 million and sent 50 million quarts of milk to Britain.

In 1978, Rogers was appointed an Officer of the Order of Canada in recognition of his years of community service and founding of Kin Canada.

In 2004, he was voted number 22 on the list of The Greatest Canadian a program televised by the CBC.

== See also ==
- Kin Canada
- Telemiracle
