= Historical rankings of prime ministers of the United Kingdom =

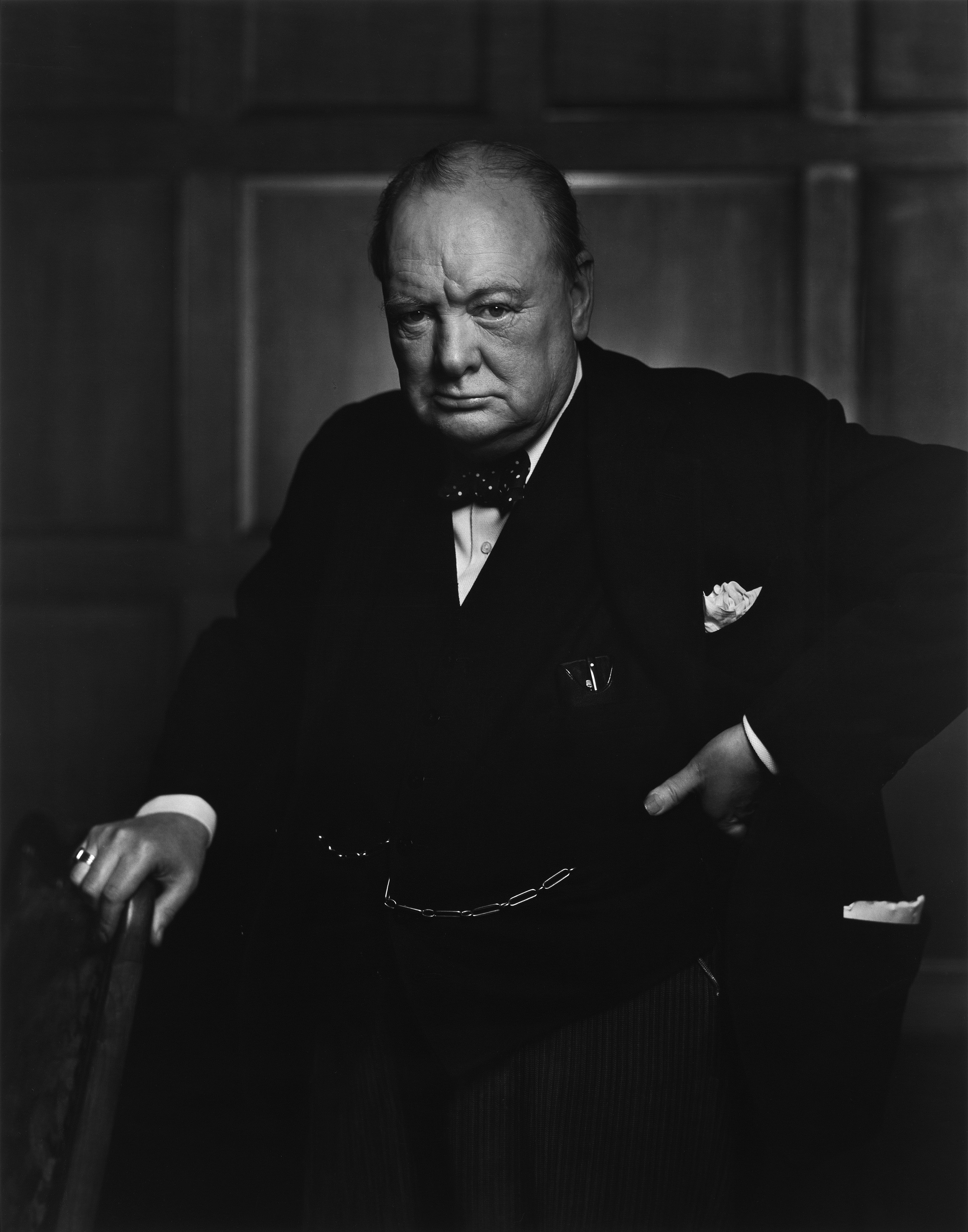
Winston Churchill is generally considered one of the greatest prime ministers for his leadership during the Second World War.

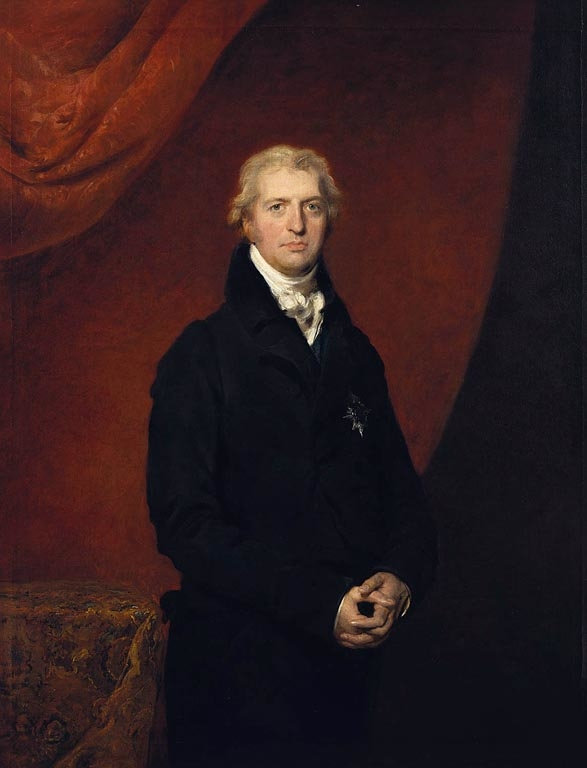
The 2nd Earl of Liverpool, a Tory prime minister from 1812 to 1827, is ranked highly despite being called "the Arch-mediocrity" by later Conservative prime minister Benjamin Disraeli.

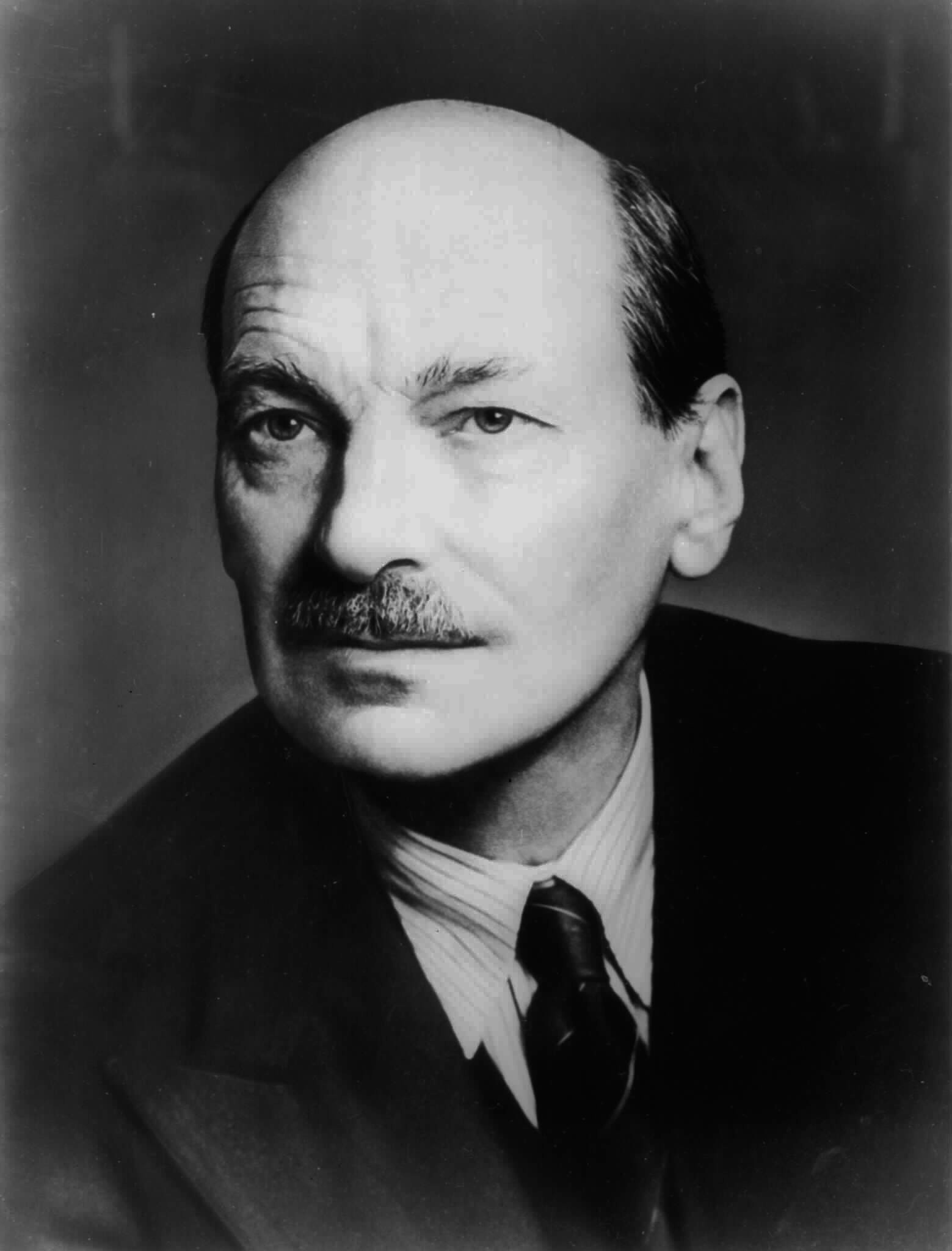
Clement Attlee, who served as Labour Leader for over 20 years, is very highly rated among prime ministers.

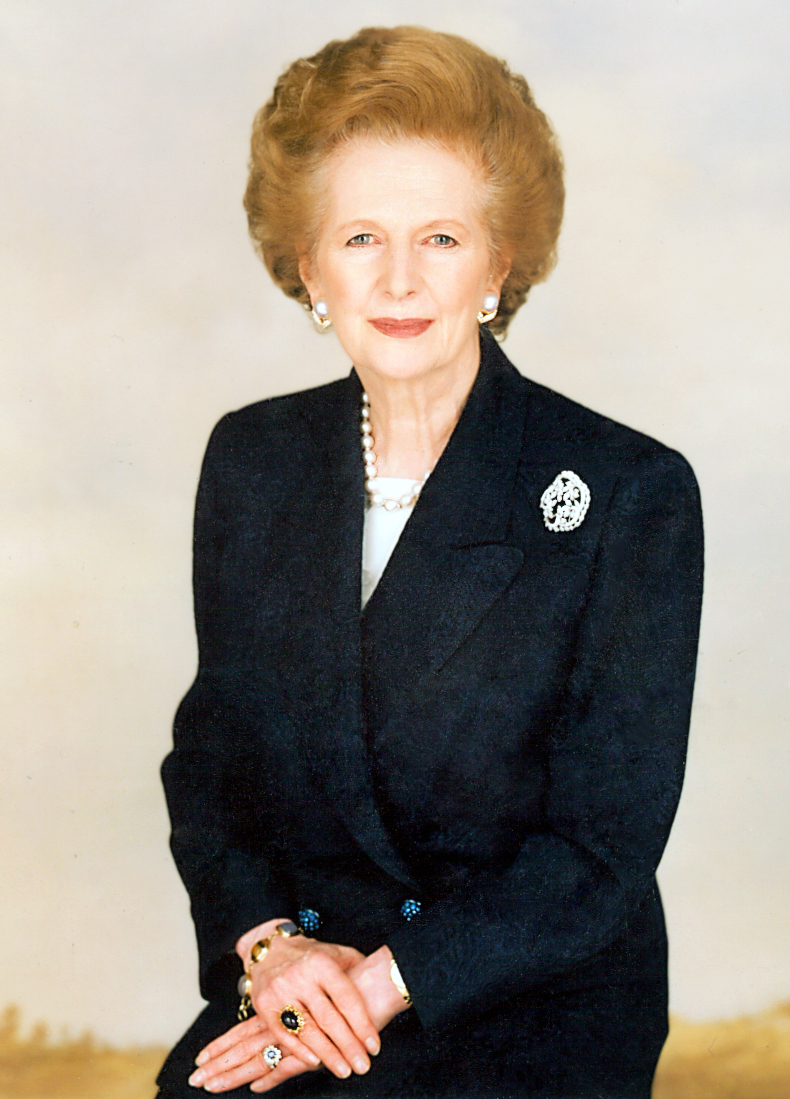
Britain's longest serving prime minister in the 20th century and first female prime minister Margaret Thatcher is rated highly by many.

Several academics, Members of Parliament, the general public, and journalists alike have attempted to rank prime ministers of the United Kingdom. Those included below generally consist of only a subset of prime ministers, typically those of the 20th century or those who served after the Second World War.

== Academic opinion ==
In December 1999, a BBC Radio 4 poll of 20 prominent historians, politicians and commentators for The Westminster Hour produced the verdict that Churchill was the best British prime minister of the 20th century, with Lloyd George in second place and Clement Attlee in third place. As Blair was still in office he was not ranked. The worst prime minister in that survey was judged to be Anthony Eden.

In 2004, the University of Leeds and Ipsos Mori conducted an online survey of 258 academics who specialised in 20th-century British history and/or politics. There were 139 replies to the survey, a return rate of 54% – by far the most extensive survey done so far. The respondents were asked, among other historical questions, to rate all the 20th-century prime ministers in terms of their success and asking them to assess the key characteristics of successful ones. Respondents were asked to indicate on a scale of 0 to 10 how successful or unsuccessful they considered each prime minister to have been in office (with 0 being highly unsuccessful and 10 highly successful). A mean of the scores was calculated and a league table based on the mean scores. The five Labour prime ministers were, on average, judged to have been the most successful, with a mean of 6.0 (median of 5.9). The three Liberals averaged 5.8 (median of 6.2) and the twelve Conservatives 4.8 (median of 4.1).

In a 2006 issue of BBC History, historian Francis Beckett ranked the 20th-century prime ministers with points out of five in 2006, based on how well the leaders implemented their policies – not on the policies themselves. Margaret Thatcher and Clement Attlee shared the highest ranking.

In 2010, the University of Leeds and Woodnewton Associates carried out a survey of 106 academics who specialised in British politics or British history, to rank the performance of all 12 prime ministers who served between 1945 and 2010. Churchill's ranking was thus determined from his second term only.

In October 2016, the University of Leeds, in conjunction with Woodnewton Associates, surveyed 82 academics specialising in post-1945 British history and politics, following the Brexit referendum. Due to the date range, Churchill's oft-lauded war ministry and caretaker ministry were not in contention and he was judged solely on his second premiership.

In June 2021, the University of Leeds, again with Woodnewton Associates, surveyed 93 academics specialising in British politics and modern British history to rank the performance of post-war prime ministers from Churchill to Theresa May.

The following table collects these surveys, although they are not all comparable.

Key:

- blue background indicates a rank within the first quartile of its respective ranking
- green background indicates a rank within the second quartile of its respective ranking
- yellow background indicates a rank within the third quartile of its respective ranking
- orange background indicates a rank within the fourth quartile of its respective ranking
- split background indicates a median which does not fall into any quartile, used when the total number of figures ranked is not a multiple of four

Rankings of prime ministers by academics
| Prime Minister | Party | Tenure | BBC Radio 4 1999 | University of Leeds/Ipsos Mori 2004 | Beckett 2006 | University of Leeds 2010 | University of Leeds 2016 | University of Leeds 2021 |
|---|---|---|---|---|---|---|---|---|
| The Marquess of Salisbury | Conservative | 1885–1886; 1886–1892; 1895–1902 | 07 (Note: Ranking might only cover the Marquess of Salisbury's premiership after 1900 or between 1895 and 1902, not between 1885 and 1886 or 1886 and 1892.) | 10 | 03 | – | – | – |
| Arthur Balfour | Conservative | 1902–1905 | 16 | 18 | 04 | – | – | – |
| Henry Campbell-Bannerman | Liberal | 1905–1908 | 09 | 11 | 02 | – | – | – |
| H. H. Asquith | Liberal | 1908–1916 | 04 | 07 | 03 | – | – | – |
| David Lloyd George | Liberal | 1916–1922 | 02 | 03 | 03 | – | – | – |
| Bonar Law | Conservative | 1922–1923 | 13 | 16 | 05 | – | – | – |
| Stanley Baldwin | Conservative | 1923–1924; 1924–1929; 1935–1937 | 08 | 08 | 03 | – | – | – |
| Ramsay MacDonald | Labour; National Labour | 1924; 1929–1935 | 14 | 14 | 05 | – | – | – |
| Neville Chamberlain | Conservative | 1937–1940 | 18 | 17 | 06 | – | – | – |
| Winston Churchill | Conservative | 1940–1945; 1951–1955 | 01 | 02 | 02 | 06 (Note: Ranking only covers Winston Churchill's premiership between 1951 and 1955, not between 1940 and 1945.) | 07 | 07= |
| Clement Attlee | Labour | 1945–1951 | 03 | 01 | 01 | 01 | 01 | 01 |
| Anthony Eden | Conservative | 1955–1957 | 19 | 20 | 06 | 12 | 13 | 13= |
| Harold Macmillan | Conservative | 1957–1963 | 06 | 05 | 02 | 04 | 04 | 05 |
| Alec Douglas-Home | Conservative | 1963–1964 | 15 | 19 | 05 | 11 | 12 | 12 |
| Harold Wilson | Labour | 1964–1970; 1974–1976 | 10 | 09 | 03 | 05 | 05 | 04 |
| Edward Heath | Conservative | 1970–1974 | 11 | 13 | 02 | 09 | 09 | 10 |
| James Callaghan | Labour | 1976–1979 | 12 | 12 | 04 | 07 | 08 | 07= |
| Margaret Thatcher | Conservative | 1979–1990 | 05 | 04 | 01 | 02 | 02 | 02 |
| John Major | Conservative | 1990–1997 | 17 | 15 | 05 | 08 | 06 | 07= |
| Tony Blair | Labour | 1997–2007 | – | 06 (Note: Ranking completed while the prime minister was in office.) | 03 | 03 | 03 | 03 |
| Gordon Brown | Labour | 2007–2010 | – | – | – | 10 | 10 | 06 |
| David Cameron | Conservative | 2010–2016 | – | – | – | – | 11 | 11 |
| Theresa May | Conservative | 2016–2019 | – | – | – | – | – | 13= |

=== Seldon, Meakin, Thoms and Egerton ===
In the book The Impossible Office?: The History of the British Prime Minister, Sir Anthony Seldon, Jonathan Meakin, Illias Thoms and Tom Egerton categorised premiers into six tiers:

- Agenda Changers: Walpole, Pitt Jr., Peel, Palmerston, Gladstone, Lloyd George, Churchill, Attlee and Thatcher
- Major Contributors: Pitt Sr., Liverpool, Disraeli, Grey, Asquith, Baldwin, Macmillan, Wilson, Heath and Blair
- Positive Stabilisers: Pelham, Newcastle, Perceval, Wellington, Salisbury, Balfour, Campbell-Bannerman, MacDonald, Callaghan, Major, Brown, Cameron and Sunak
- Noble Failures: North, Russell, Derby, Chamberlain and May
- Ignoble Failures: Grenville Sr., Portland, Addington, Melbourne, Eden, Johnson and Truss
- Left on the Starting Line: Devonshire, Shelburne, Compton, Bute, Grafton, Rockingham, Aberdeen, Rosebery, Grenville Jr., Canning, Goderich, Bonar Law and Douglas-Home.

The latter category is for prime ministers whose tenures were too short to be properly evaluated (though Truss, with the shortest tenure of all, was not placed here).

== Opinion of members of Parliament ==
In 2013, a group of academic staff and students at Royal Holloway, University of London, conducted a postal survey of British members of Parliament, asking them to evaluate the success of post-war British prime ministers. Some 158 MPs replied to the survey, a response rate of 24%. The respondents were 69 Conservatives, 67 Labour MPs, 14 Liberal Democrats and 8 MPs from other parties.

The survey used the same question employed in the 2004 and 2010 University of Leeds studies: MPs were asked how successful or unsuccessful they considered each prime minister to have been using a 0 to 10 scale, where 0 meant highly unsuccessful and 10 meant highly successful.

Overall, MPs rated Margaret Thatcher as the most successful post-war prime minister, just ahead of Clement Attlee. With the exception of Edward Heath, who was judged more favourably by Labour MPs than by Conservatives, evaluations were split along party lines: Conservative MPs tended to consider Conservative prime ministers to be more successful than did Labour MPs, and Labour MPs generally gave Labour prime ministers higher scores than did Conservative MPs.

In 2023, the survey was redone with 65 correspondences.

Key:

- blue background indicates a rank within the first quartile of its respective ranking
- green background indicates a rank within the second quartile of its respective ranking
- yellow background indicates a rank within the third quartile of its respective ranking
- orange background indicates a rank within the fourth quartile of its respective ranking
- split background indicates a median which does not fall into any quartile, used when the total number of figures ranked is not a multiple of four

Rankings of prime ministers by members of Parliament
| Prime Minister | Party | Tenure | 2013 | 2023 |
|---|---|---|---|---|
| Winston Churchill | Conservative | (1940–1945); 1951–1955 | 04 | 04 |
| Clement Attlee | Labour | 1945–1951 | 02 | 02 |
| Anthony Eden | Conservative | 1955–1957 | 11 | 15 |
| Harold Macmillan | Conservative | 1957–1963 | 05 | 06 |
| Alec Douglas-Home | Conservative | 1963–1964 | 10 | 14 |
| Harold Wilson | Labour | 1964–1970; 1974–1976 | 06 | 05 |
| Edward Heath | Conservative | 1970–1974 | 09 | 12 |
| James Callaghan | Labour | 1976–1979 | 08 | 10 |
| Margaret Thatcher | Conservative | 1979–1990 | 01 | 01 |
| John Major | Conservative | 1990–1997 | 07 | 08 |
| Tony Blair | Labour | 1997–2007 | 03 | 03 |
| Gordon Brown | Labour | 2007–2010 | 12 | 09 |
| David Cameron | Conservative | 2010–2016 | – | 07 |
| Theresa May | Conservative | 2016–2019 | – | 13 |
| Boris Johnson | Conservative | 2019–2022 | – | 11 |
| Liz Truss | Conservative | 2022 | – | 16 |

== Popular opinion ==
=== BBC polls 2007 and 2008 ===
The BBC television programme The Daily Politics asked viewers in 2007 to select their favourite prime minister out of a list of ten who served between 1945 and 2007 (excluding Churchill). In 2008, BBC Newsnight held a poll of 27,000 people, to decide the UK's greatest and worst post-war prime minister.

Key:

- blue background indicates a rank within the first quartile of its respective ranking
- green background indicates a rank within the second quartile of its respective ranking
- yellow background indicates a rank within the third quartile of its respective ranking
- orange background indicates a rank within the fourth quartile of its respective ranking
- split background indicates a median which does not fall into any quartile, used when the total number of figures ranked is not a multiple of four

Rankings of prime ministers by the general public
| Prime Minister | Party | Tenure | BBC The Daily Politics 2007 | BBC Newsnight 2008 |
|---|---|---|---|---|
| Winston Churchill | Conservative | (1940–1945); 1951–1955 | – | 01 |
| Clement Attlee | Labour | 1945–1951 | 02 | 02 |
| Anthony Eden | Conservative | 1955–1957 | 09 | 11 |
| Harold Macmillan | Conservative | 1957–1963 | 06 | 04 |
| Alec Douglas-Home | Conservative | 1963–1964 | 08 | 10 |
| Harold Wilson | Labour | 1964–1970; 1974–1976 | 04 | 05 |
| Edward Heath | Conservative | 1970–1974 | 07 | 07 |
| James Callaghan | Labour | 1976–1979 | 10 | 09 |
| Margaret Thatcher | Conservative | 1979–1990 | 01 | 03 |
| John Major | Conservative | 1990–1997 | 05 | 08 |
| Tony Blair | Labour | 1997–2007 | 03 | 06 |
| Gordon Brown | Labour | 2007–2010 | – | 12 |

While the poll indicated that respondents should only consider the period from 1945 onwards, whether or not respondents opted to separate Churchill's first term (1940–45) from his second in their evaluation should be weighed in this evaluation versus other polls (e.g. of academics), who generally rate Churchill's second term as being substantially worse than his first by comparison. Additionally, in a BBC poll to find the 100 Greatest Britons in 2002, five prime ministers were ranked in the top 100. Winston Churchill was voted greatest Briton, the Duke of Wellington was in 15th place, Margaret Thatcher was in 16th place, Tony Blair was 67th and David Lloyd George was 79th.

== Journalistic opinion ==
Both The Times and broadcaster Iain Dale have specifically ranked all (or almost all) British prime ministers. The results are shown below:

Key:

- blue background indicates a rank within the first quartile of its respective ranking
- green background indicates a rank within the second quartile of its respective ranking
- yellow background indicates a rank within the third quartile of its respective ranking
- orange background indicates a rank within the fourth quartile of its respective ranking
- split background indicates a median which does not fall into any quartile, used when the total number of figures ranked is not a multiple of four

Rankings of prime ministers by journalists
| Prime Minister | Party | Tenure | The Times 2010 | Parris 2010 | Riddell 2010 | MacIntyre 2010 | Dale 2020 |
|---|---|---|---|---|---|---|---|
| Robert Walpole | Whig | 1721–1742 | 09 | 14 | 16 | 07 | 10 |
| Earl of Wilmington | Whig | 1742–1743 | – | 50 | 51 | 42 | 52 |
| Henry Pelham | Whig | 1743–1754 | 29 | 19 | 34 | 20 | 19 |
| Duke of Newcastle | Whig | 1754–1756; 1757–1762 | 41 | 40 | 32 | 41 | 22 |
| Duke of Devonshire | Whig | 1756–1757 | 44 | 35 | 44 | 47 | 53 |
| Earl of Bute | Tory | 1762–1763 | 46 | 44 | 49 | 40 | 42 |
| George Grenville | Whig | 1763–1765 | 48 | 51 | 48 | 39 | 44 |
| Marquess of Rockingham | Whig | 1765–1766; 1782 | 32 | 30 | 42 | 38 | 27 |
| William Pitt the Elder | Whig | 1766–1768 | 16 | 25 | 14 | 18 | 25 |
| Duke of Grafton | Whig | 1768–1770 | 49 | 42 | 50 | 49 | 38 |
| Lord North | Tory | 1770–1782 | 50 | 49 | 37 | 44 | 40 |
| Earl of Shelburne | Whig | 1782–1783 | 26 | 29 | 41 | 05 | 41 |
| Duke of Portland | Whig; Tory | 1783; 1807–1809 | 39 | 27 | 43 | 37 | 43 |
| William Pitt the Younger | Tory | 1783–1801; 1804–1806 | 04 | 12 | 05 | 03 | 03 |
| Henry Addington | Tory | 1801–1804 | 39 | 36 | 39 | 36 | 26 |
| Baron Grenville | Whig | 1806–1807 | 43 | 39 | 40 | 35 | 36 |
| Spencer Perceval | Tory | 1809–1812 | 36 | 38 | 47 | 33 | 37 |
| Earl of Liverpool | Tory | 1812–1827 | 19 | 22 | 22 | 15 | 20 |
| George Canning | Tory | 1827 | 31 | 08 | 36 | 23 | 54 |
| Viscount Goderich | Tory | 1827–1828 | – | 37 | 52 | 51 | 55 |
| Duke of Wellington | Tory | 1828–1830; 1834 | 24 | 18 | 30 | 17 | 33 |
| Earl Grey | Whig | 1830–1834 | 08 | 09 | 10 | 06 | 13 |
| Viscount Melbourne | Whig | 1834; 1835–1841 | 25 | 26 | 21 | 32 | 24 |
| Robert Peel | Conservative | 1834–1835; 1841–1846 | 06 | 06 | 08 | 08 | 12 |
| Lord John Russell | Whig; Liberal | 1846–1852; 1865–1866 | 21 | 15 | 29 | 14 | 18 |
| Earl of Derby | Conservative | 1852; 1858–1859; 1866–1868 | 18 | 23 | 19 | 16 | 16 |
| Earl of Aberdeen | Peelite | 1852–1855 | 42 | 41 | 31 | 43 | 39 |
| Viscount Palmerston | Whig; Liberal | 1855–1858; 1859–1865 | 13 | 11 | 20 | 11 | 17 |
| Benjamin Disraeli | Conservative | 1868; 1874–1880 | 10 | 07 | 06 | 09 | 08 |
| William Ewart Gladstone | Liberal | 1868–1874; 1880–1885; 1886; 1892–1894 | 03 | 04 | 02 | 04 | 02 |
| Marquess of Salisbury | Conservative | 1885–1886; 1886–1892; 1895–1902 | 11 | 10 | 12 | 25 | 09 |
| Earl of Rosebery | Liberal | 1894–1895 | 45 | 46 | 46 | 50 | 46 |
| Arthur Balfour | Conservative | 1902–1905 | 30 | 28 | 38 | 31 | 31 |
| Henry Campbell-Bannerman | Liberal | 1905–1908 | 22 | 24 | 26 | 30 | 23 |
| H. H. Asquith | Liberal | 1908–1916 | 11 | 21 | 09 | 26 | 07 |
| David Lloyd George | Liberal | 1916–1922 | 02 | 02 | 03 | 02 | 06 |
| Bonar Law | Conservative | 1922–1923 | 34 | 47 | 35 | 24 | 49 |
| Stanley Baldwin | Conservative | 1923–1924; 1924–1929; 1935–1937 | 14 | 20 | 11 | 13 | 11 |
| Ramsay MacDonald | Labour; National Labour | 1924; 1929–1935 | 33 | 48 | 33 | 29 | 30 |
| Neville Chamberlain | Conservative | 1937–1940 | 35 | 45 | 28 | 52 | 47 |
| Winston Churchill | Conservative | 1940–1945; 1951–1955 | 01 | 01 | 01 | 01 | 01 |
| Clement Attlee | Labour | 1945–1951 | 07 | 05 | 07 | 22 | 05 |
| Anthony Eden | Conservative | 1955–1957 | 47 | 43 | 45 | 48 | 51 |
| Harold Macmillan | Conservative | 1957–1963 | 15 | 17 | 13 | 21 | 21 |
| Alec Douglas-Home | Conservative | 1963–1964 | 36 | 32 | 27 | 34 | 48 |
| Harold Wilson | Labour | 1964–1970; 1974–1976 | 20 | 33 | 17 | 19 | 15 |
| Edward Heath | Conservative | 1970–1974 | 23 | 13 | 18 | 46 | 35 |
| James Callaghan | Labour | 1976–1979 | 27 | 31 | 24 | 27 | 34 |
| Margaret Thatcher | Conservative | 1979–1990 | 05 | 03 | 04 | 10 | 04 |
| John Major | Conservative | 1990–1997 | 28 | 16 | 23 | 28 | 28 |
| Tony Blair | Labour | 1997–2007 | 16 | 34 | 15 | 12 | 14 |
| Gordon Brown | Labour | 2007–2010 | 36 (Note: Ranking may have been completed while the prime minister was in office.) | 52 | 25 | 45 | 32 |
| David Cameron | Conservative | 2010–2016 | – | – | – | – | 29 |
| Theresa May | Conservative | 2016–2019 | – | – | – | – | 50 |
| Boris Johnson | Conservative | 2019–2022 | – | – | – | – | 45 |

== See also ==
- 100 Greatest Britons
- List of current heads of government in the United Kingdom and dependencies

Other countries

- Historical rankings of prime ministers of Australia
- Historical rankings of prime ministers of Canada
- Historical rankings of chancellors of Germany
- Historical rankings of prime ministers of the Netherlands
- Historical rankings of presidents of the United States
