= Historical rankings of chancellors of Germany =

Historical rankings of chancellors of Germany are surveys conducted to construct rankings of the success and popularity of the individuals who have served as Chancellor of Germany in the Federal Republic of Germany from 1949 onwards.

== Opinion polls ==
=== Overview ===
==== Opinion poll rankings of the greatest chancellor ====
Order	Chancellor	Political party	Tenure	Emnid (2005)	Infratest dimap (2010)	YouGov (2015)
1	Konrad Adenauer	CDU	1949 – 1963	03	–	02
2	Ludwig Erhard	CDU	1963 – 1966	06	–	07
3	Kurt Georg Kiesinger	CDU	1966 – 1969	07	–	08
4	Willy Brandt	SPD	1969 – 1974	04	02	04
–	Walter Scheel ^	FDP	7–16 May 1974	–	–	–
5	Helmut Schmidt	SPD	1974 – 1982	01	01	01
6	Helmut Kohl	CDU	1982 – 1998	02	04	05
7	Gerhard Schröder	SPD	1998 – 2005	05	05	06
8	Angela Merkel	CDU	2005 – 2021	–	03	02
9	Olaf Scholz	SPD	2021 – 2025	–	–	–
10	Friedrich Merz	CDU	2025 –	–	–	–

^ Following Willy Brandt's resignation as Chancellor, Walter Scheel was acting Chancellor for nine days.

==== Opinion poll rankings of the most important chancellor ====
Order	Chancellor	Political party	Tenure	ZDF (2003)	Forsa (2005)	Forsa (2013)
1	Konrad Adenauer	CDU	1949 – 1963	01	01	02
2	Ludwig Erhard	CDU	1963 – 1966	05	05	07
3	Kurt Georg Kiesinger	CDU	1966 – 1969	–	07	08
4	Willy Brandt	SPD	1969 – 1974	02	02	03
–	Walter Scheel ^	FDP	7 May – 16 May 1974	–	–	–
5	Helmut Schmidt	SPD	1974 – 1982	04	03	01
6	Helmut Kohl	CDU	1982 – 1998	03	04	04
7	Gerhard Schröder	SPD	1998 – 2005	06	06	06
8	Angela Merkel	CDU	2005 – 2021	–	–	05
9	Olaf Scholz	SPD	2021 – 2025	–	–	–
10	Friedrich Merz	CDU	2025 –	–	–	–

^ Following Willy Brandt's resignation as Chancellor, Walter Scheel was acting Chancellor for nine days.

=== ZDF (2003) ===
For the TV show Unsere Besten, more than 1 million Germans were asked to rank the 100 most notable Germans in an unrepresentative opinion poll. The list also included German chancellors:

1. Konrad Adenauer (#1 overall)
2. Willy Brandt (#5)
3. Helmut Kohl (#13)
4. Helmut Schmidt (#21)
5. Ludwig Erhard (#27)
6. Gerhard Schröder (#82)

Neither Kurt Georg Kiesinger nor Angela Merkel (who was leader of the opposition at that time) were ranked among the 100 most notable Germans.

=== Forsa (2005) ===
In an opinion poll conducted by Forsa in July 2005, the 1002 pollees were supposed to name the most notable German chancellor:

1. Konrad Adenauer – 35%
2. Willy Brandt – 20%
3. Helmut Schmidt – 18%
4. Helmut Kohl – 17%
5. Ludwig Erhard – 5%
6. Gerhard Schröder – 1%
7. Kurt Georg Kiesinger – 0%

The poll didn't include Chancellor Angela Merkel, since she didn't assume office until November 2005.

=== Emnid (2005) ===
In an opinion poll from November 2005, the polling company Emnid asked for the best German chancellor:

1. Helmut Schmidt – 28%
2. Helmut Kohl – 18%
3. Konrad Adenauer – 17%
4. Willy Brandt – 15%
5. Gerhard Schröder – 10%
6. Ludwig Erhard – 3%
7. Kurt Georg Kiesinger – 1%

The poll didn't include Chancellor Angela Merkel, since she had only assumed office in November 2005.

=== Infratest dimap (2010) ===
In March 2010, Infratest dimap asked 1500 people for their view of the term in office of German chancellors. The given numbers show the percentage of people agreeing with the statement that the named chancellor was a good one:

1. Helmut Schmidt – 75%
2. Willy Brandt – 68%
3. Angela Merkel – 67%
4. Helmut Kohl – 59%
5. Gerhard Schröder – 47%

The poll didn't include the first three German chancellors (Adenauer, Erhard, Kiesinger).

=== Forsa (2013) ===
In December 2013, Forsa asked 1002 Germans to name the most notable German chancellor:

1. Helmut Schmidt – 25%
2. Konrad Adenauer – 23%
3. Willy Brandt – 18%
4. Helmut Kohl – 17%
5. Angela Merkel – 6%
6. Gerhard Schröder – 3%
7. Ludwig Erhard – 2%
8. Kurt Georg Kiesinger – 0%

=== YouGov (2015) ===
In May 2015, YouGov asked 1111 Germans to name the best German chancellor in their opinion:

1. Helmut Schmidt – 24%
2. Konrad Adenauer and Angela Merkel – 18%
3. Willy Brandt – 15%
4. Helmut Kohl – 9%
5. Gerhard Schröder – 5%
6. Ludwig Erhard – 4%
7. Kurt Georg Kiesinger – 1%

== See also ==
- Historical rankings of prime ministers of Australia
- Historical rankings of prime ministers of Canada
- Historical rankings of prime ministers of the Netherlands
- Historical rankings of prime ministers of the United Kingdom
- Historical rankings of presidents of the United States
