= List of prime ministers of George VI =

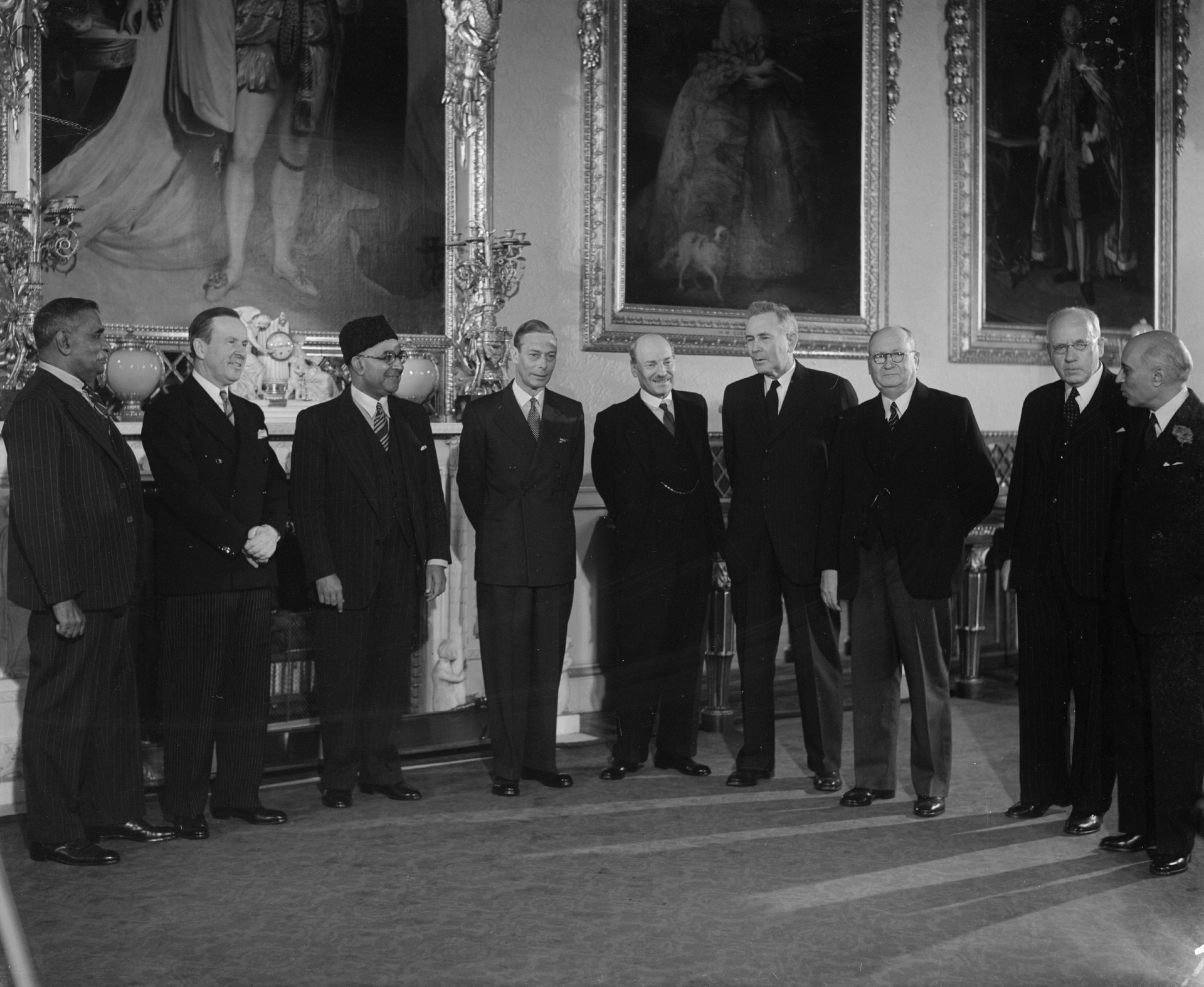
King George VI with Commonwealth prime ministers at Buckingham Palace for the 1949 Commonwealth Prime Ministers' Conference

King George VI was the monarch of the United Kingdom, the Dominions (Note: Newfoundland, although a Dominion, had suspended self-governance in 1934, and was ruled directly by a British Commission.), and the British Empire from 11 December 1936 until his death on 6 February 1952.

He also was a founder and the first Head of the Commonwealth of Nations.

During his reign George was served by a total of 32 prime ministers; 4 from the United Kingdom, 7 from Australia, 2 from Canada, 1 from Ceylon, 1 from India, 2 from Ireland, 3 from Malta, 3 from New Zealand, 3 from Northern Ireland, 2 from Pakistan, 3 from South Africa, and 1 from Southern Rhodesia.

== List of prime ministers ==
=== Australia ===
No.	Portrait	Name	Date of ascension/Took office	Date of death/Left office
1		Joseph Lyons	6 January 1932	7 April 1939
2		Sir Earle Page	7 April 1939	26 April 1939
3		Robert Menzies	26 April 1939	28 August 1941
4		Arthur Fadden	28 August 1941	7 October 1941
5		John Curtin	7 October 1941	5 July 1945
6		Frank Forde	6 July 1945	13 July 1945
7		Ben Chifley	13 July 1945	19 December 1949
8		Robert Menzies	19 December 1949	26 January 1966

=== Canada ===
No.	Portrait	Name	Date of ascension/Took office	Date of death/Left office
1		William Lyon Mackenzie King	23 October 1935	15 November 1948
2		Louis St. Laurent	15 November 1948	21 June 1957

=== Ceylon ===
No.	Portrait	Name	Date of ascension/Took office	Date of death/Left office
1		Don Stephen Senanayake	24 September 1947	22 March 1952

=== India ===
No.	Portrait	Name	Date of ascension/Took office	Date of death/Left office
1		Jawaharlal Nehru	15 August 1947	26 January 1950 (Republic of India)

=== Irish Free State ===
No.	Portrait	Name	Date of ascension/Took office	Date of death/Left office
1		Éamon de Valera	11 December 1936	18 February 1948
2		John A. Costello	18 February 1948	18 April 1949 (Republic of Ireland Act 1948)

=== Malta ===
No.	Portrait	Name	Date of ascension/Took office	Date of death/Left office
1		Paul Boffa	4 November 1947	26 September 1950
2		Enrico Mizzi	26 September 1950	20 December 1950
3		Giorgio Borġ Olivier	20 December 1950	11 March 1955

=== New Zealand ===
No.	Portrait	Name	Date of ascension/Took office	Date of death/Left office
1		Michael Joseph Savage	11 December 1936	27 March 1940
2		Peter Fraser	27 March 1940	13 December 1949
3		Sidney Holland	13 December 1949	20 September 1957

=== Northern Ireland ===
No.	Portrait	Name	Date of ascension/Took office	Date of death/Left office
1		James Craig	11 December 1936	24 November 1940
2		J. M. Andrews	24 November 1940	1 May 1943
3		Basil Brooke	1 May 1943	26 March 1963

=== Pakistan ===
No.	Portrait	Name	Date of ascension/Took office	Date of death/Left office
1		Liaquat Ali Khan	14 August 1947	16 October 1951
2		Khawaja Nazimuddin	17 October 1951	17 April 1953

=== South Africa ===
No.	Portrait	Name	Date of ascension/Took office	Date of death/Left office
1		J. B. M. Hertzog	11 December 1936	5 September 1939
2		Jan Smuts	5 September 1939	4 June 1948
3		Daniel François Malan	4 June 1948	30 November 1954

=== Southern Rhodesia ===
No.	Portrait	Name	Date of ascension/Took office	Date of death/Left office
1		Godfrey Huggins	12 September 1933	7 September 1953

=== United Kingdom ===
No.	Portrait	Name	Date of ascension/Took office	Date of death/Left office
1		Stanley Baldwin	7 June 1935	28 May 1937
2		Neville Chamberlain	28 May 1937	10 May 1940
3		Winston Churchill	10 May 1940	26 July 1945
4		Clement Attlee	26 July 1945	26 October 1951
(3)		Winston Churchill	26 October 1951	5 April 1955

List of prime ministers of George VI House of Windsor Cadet branch of the House of Wettin Born: 14 December 1895 Died: 6 February 1952
Regnal titles
Preceded by Edward VIII	King of the United Kingdom and British dominions beyond the seas 11 December 1936 – 6 February 1952	Succeeded by Elizabeth II; As Queen of the Commonwealth realms
Preceded by Edward VIII	Emperor of India; 11 December 1936 – 22 June 1948	End of title
Preceded by Edward VIII	King of Newfoundland; 11 December 1936 – 31 March 1949	End of title As King of Canada
Preceded by Edward VIII	King of Australia; 11 December 1936 – 6 February 1952	Succeeded by Elizabeth II
Preceded by Edward VIII	King of Canada; 11 December 1936 – 6 February 1952	Succeeded by Elizabeth II
Preceded by Edward VIII	King of Ireland; 11 December 1936 – 29 December 1937	Succeeded by Douglas Hyde (President of Ireland)
Preceded by Edward VIII	King of New Zealand; 11 December 1936 – 6 February 1952	Succeeded by Elizabeth II
Preceded by Edward VIII	King of South Africa; 11 December 1936 – 6 February 1952	Succeeded by Elizabeth II
Preceded by Himself as King of the United Kingdom	King of Ceylon; 4 February 1948 – 6 February 1952	Succeeded by Elizabeth II
Preceded by Himself as Emperor of India	King of India; 15 August 1947 – 26 January 1950	Succeeded by Rajendra Prasad (President of India)
Preceded by Himself as Emperor of India	King of Pakistan; 15 August 1947 – 6 February 1952	Succeeded by Elizabeth II
Political offices
New title	Head of the Commonwealth; 28 April 1949 – 6 February 1952	Succeeded by Elizabeth II
British royalty
Preceded by Edward, Prince of Wales later became King Edward VIII, later known as Edward, Duke of Windsor	Heir to the Throne as heir presumptive 20 January 1936 – 11 December 1936	Succeeded by The Princess Elizabeth, Duchess of Edinburgh later became Queen Elizabeth II

== See also ==
- British Empire
- Constitutional monarchy
- Commonwealth of Nations
- Dominion
