= List of prime ministers of George V =

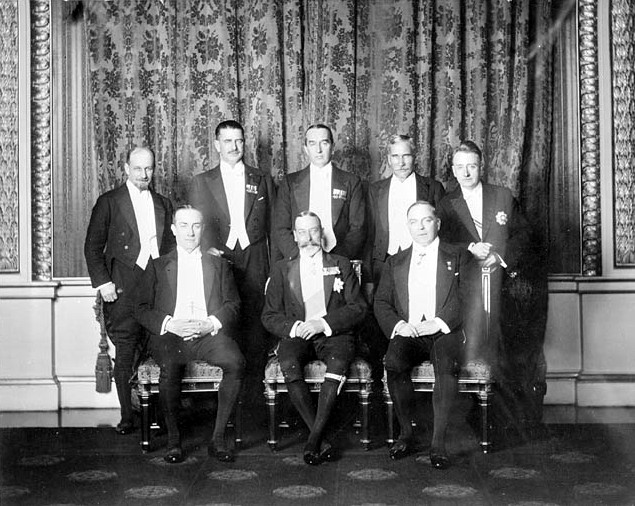
King George V with his prime ministers. Standing (left to right): W.S. Monroe (Newfoundland), Gordon Coates (New Zealand), Stanley Bruce (Australia), J. B. M. Hertzog (Union of South Africa), and W. T. Cosgrave (Irish Free State). Seated: Stanley Baldwin (United Kingdom) and William Mackenzie King (Canada)

King George V was the monarch of the United Kingdom and the British Empire and its successor from 6 May 1910 until his death on 20 January 1936.

During his reign, George V was served by a total of 43 prime ministers; 9 from Newfoundland, 7 from New Zealand, 6 from Australia, 5 from the Dominion of Canada, 5 from the United Kingdom, 4 from Malta, 4 from Southern Rhodesia, and 3 from South Africa.

== List of prime ministers ==
No.	Portrait	Name	Took office	Left office/died or end of reign
=== Australia ===
1		Andrew Fisher	6 May 1910	24 June 1913
2		Joseph Cook	24 June 1913	17 September 1914
(1)		Andrew Fisher	17 September 1914	27 October 1915
3		Billy Hughes	27 October 1915	9 February 1923
4		Stanley Bruce	9 February 1923	22 October 1929
5		James Scullin	22 October 1929	6 January 1932
6		Joseph Lyons	6 January 1932	20 January 1936
=== Canada ===
1		Wilfrid Laurier	6 May 1910	6 October 1911
2		Robert Borden	10 October 1911	10 July 1920
3		Arthur Meighen	10 July 1920	29 December 1921
4		William Lyon Mackenzie King	29 December 1921	29 June 1926
(3)		Arthur Meighen	29 June 1926	25 September 1926
(4)		William Lyon Mackenzie King	25 September 1926	6 August 1930
5		R. B. Bennett	7 August 1930	23 October 1935
(4)		William Lyon Mackenzie King	23 October 1935	20 January 1936
=== Cape Colony ===
1		John Xavier Merriman	6 May 1910	31 May 1910
=== Irish Free State === Source:
1		W. T. Cosgrave	6 December 1922	9 March 1932
2		Éamon de Valera	9 March 1932	20 January 1936
=== Malta ===
1		Joseph Howard	26 October 1921	13 October 1923
2		Francesco Buhagiar	13 October 1923	22 September 1924
3		Ugo Pasquale Mifsud	September 1924	August 1927
4		Gerald Strickland	August 1927	21 June 1932
5		Ugo Pasquale Mifsud	21 June 1932	2 November 1933
=== New Zealand ===
1		Joseph Ward	6 May 1910	28 March 1912
2		Thomas Mackenzie	28 March 1912	10 July 1912
3		William Massey	10 July 1912	10 May 1925
4		Francis Bell	10 May 1925	30 May 1925
5		Gordon Coates	30 May 1925	10 December 1928
6		Joseph Ward	10 December 1928	28 May 1930
7		George Forbes	28 May 1930	6 December 1935
8		Michael Joseph Savage	6 December 1935	20 January 1936
=== Newfoundland ===
1		Edward Morris	6 May 1910	31 December 1917
2		Sir John Crosbie (Acting)	31 December 1917	5 January 1918
3		William F. Lloyd	5 January 1918	22 May 1919
4		Michael Patrick Cashin	22 May 1919	17 November 1919
5		Richard Squires	19 November 1919	24 July 1923
6		William Warren	24 July 1923	10 May 1924
7		Albert Hickman (Acting)	10 May 1924	9 June 1924
8		Walter Stanley Monroe	9 June 1924	August 1928
9		Frederick C. Alderdice	August 1928	17 November 1928
(5th)		Richard Squires	17 November 1928	June 1932
(9th)		Frederick C. Alderdice	June 1932	16 February 1934 (Commission of Government)
=== Northern Ireland ===
1		James Craig	7 June 1921	20 January 1936
=== South Africa ===
1		Louis Botha	31 May 1910	27 August 1919
2		Jan Christiaan Smuts	3 September 1919	30 June 1924
3		J. B. M. Hertzog	30 June 1924	20 January 1936
=== Southern Rhodesia ===
1		Charles Coghlan	1 October 1923	28 August 1927
2		Howard Unwin Moffat	2 September 1927	5 July 1933
3		George Mitchell	5 July 1933	12 September 1933
4		Godfrey Huggins	12 September 1933	20 January 1936
=== United Kingdom ===
1		H. H. Asquith	6 May 1910	5 December 1916
2		David Lloyd George	6 December 1916	19 October 1922
3		Bonar Law	23 October 1922	20 May 1923
4		Stanley Baldwin	22 May 1923	22 January 1924
5		Ramsay MacDonald	22 January 1924	4 November 1924
(4)		Stanley Baldwin	4 November 1924	4 June 1929
(5)		Ramsay MacDonald	5 June 1929	7 June 1935
(4)		Stanley Baldwin	7 June 1935	20 January 1936

== See also ==
- British Empire
- Commonwealth of Nations
- Constitutional monarchy
- Dominion
