= Kin Canada =

Canadian service organization

- Founded: February 20, 1920; 106 years ago
- Founder: Hal Rogers
- Type: National non-profit service association
- Purpose: Community service, fellowship, and personal development through volunteerism
- Headquarters: Cambridge, Ontario, Canada
- Location(s): Cambridge, Ontario; 1920 Hal Rogers Drive
- Origins: Hamilton, Ontario
- Region served: Canada
- Members: Over 4000 members across more than 300 clubs
- Key people: National Board of Directors
- Website: http://www.kincanada.ca

Kin Canada (formerly the Kinsmen and Kinette Clubs of Canada) is a secular Canadian non-profit service organization. It promotes service, fellowship, positive values, and national pride. The members comprise Kinsmen, Kinette and Kin Clubs (service clubs) located throughout the country. Membership is open to all persons regardless of race, colour, or creed.

== Members ==
Around 7,000 members belong to about 500 Kinsmen, Kinette and Kin clubs from coast to coast. Kinsmen clubs are predominantly male-only while Kinette clubs are predominantly female-only. Kin clubs have a mixed membership of men and women. The Association was founded in Canada and there are no clubs outside of Canada.

== History ==
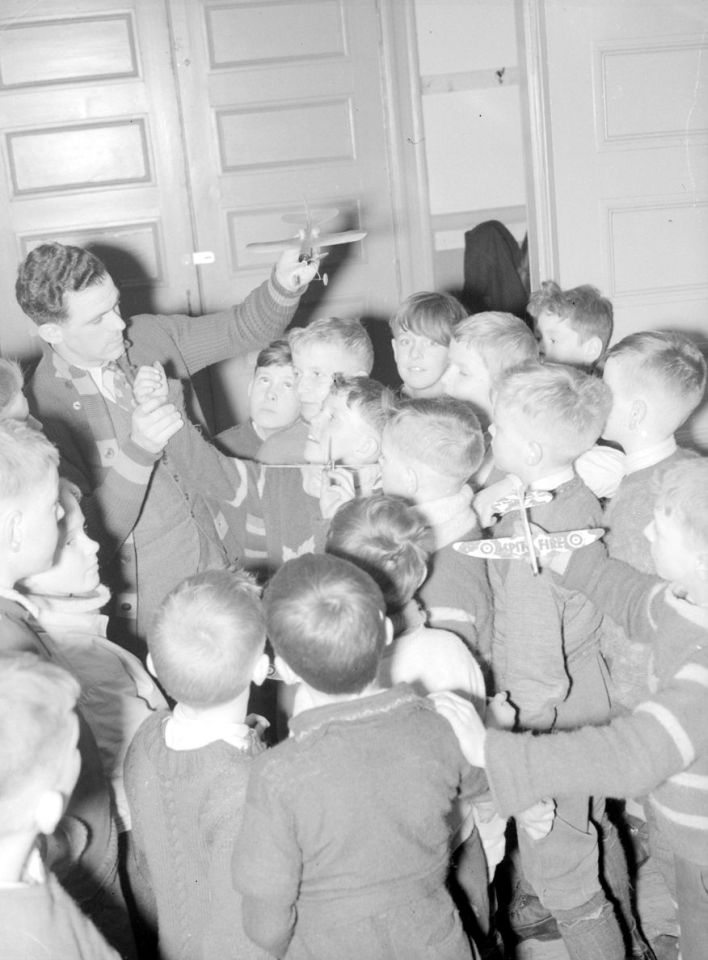
Kinsmen Boys' Club of Rosemont in Montreal, Quebec, in 1942

In 1920, Harold A. Rogers, known in Kin Canada circles as "Founder Hal", founded the first Kinsmen club in Hamilton, Ontario. Rogers, a 21-year-old, had just returned from World War I and his father, a well-known Rotarian, encouraged him to join the Rotary Club. Rogers was rejected because the Rotary Club would not allow two members from the same business establishment. Not a person to be outdone, Rogers decided to create a new club. As a result of his initiative, a small group of like-minded men gathered for a dinner meeting on February 20, 1920 and formed what became known as the Kinsmen Club of Hamilton – Canada's first Kinsmen Club.

== Prominent members ==
Prominent former and current Kin members include:

- Prime Minister John Diefenbaker.
- Governor General Ray Hnatyshyn.
- Ontario Premier Ernie Eves.
- Ontario MPP Bruce Crozier.
- British Columbia cabinet minister Rich Coleman
- Newfoundland and Labrador MHA, MP, 12th Lieutenant Governor of Newfoundland and Labrador John C. Crosbie.
- Senate of Canada MHA, MP, Former Liberal Senator for St. John's East, Newfoundland and Labrador Eric Cook.
- Newfoundland and Labrador MHA, Former Leader of the Liberal Party of Newfoundland and Labrador Len Stirling.
- Newfoundland and Labrador MHA, 9th Mayor of the City of St. John's, Newfoundland and Labrador William G. Adams.

== Projects ==
Clubs independently determine what needs in their community they would like to assist with and often partner with municipalities and/or local non-profit organizations to meet those needs. The projects vary from clubs to club, but some examples include:

- Providing funds to hospitals and local organizations
- Supplying resources or services to local schools
- Assisting with the building of community housing
- Building play structures, splash pads and recreation facilities eg. The Kinsmen Field House, a sports venue in Edmonton
- Organizing Christmas parades
- Holding toy and food drives
- Hosting community carnivals, festivals or events

Since the Association's founding, clubs have raised over $1 billion for Canadian communities. Together, the clubs raised CAD $20 million and volunteered over 500,000 hours in the 2018–2019 Kin year.

=== Cystic fibrosis ===
Since 1964, Kin Canada has supported Cystic Fibrosis Canada, often raising over CAD $1 million a year for cystic fibrosis (CF) research and treatment. To date, Kin have raised more than $47 million for CF. This makes Kin the country's largest single fundraiser for cystic fibrosis.

=== Kin Canada Bursaries ===
Kin Canada Bursaries, a program of the Hal Rogers Endowment Fund, provides financial assistance to eligible persons in their quest for higher learning. Kin Canada established the Hal Rogers Endowment Fund upon the passing of founder Hal Rogers.

=== Kin Canada Foundation ===
The Kin Canada Foundation is an incorporated and federally chartered charitable organization established in 2005 to help Kin Canada achieve the objective of "Serving the Community’s Greatest Need". The Foundation's primary goal is to work hand-in-hand with Kin Canada to help resource and develop many of the programs provided for the benefit of the members across Canada.

=== Canadian Blood Services ===
Kin Canada established a national partnership with Canadian Blood Services in 2014, however Kin clubs have been involved with blood donation in various ways over the decades. Since 2014 Kin members have donated over 4000 units of blood.

=== Organ Donor Awareness ===
The Kin Organ Donor Awareness Campaign (Kin-ODAC) was established in 2001 at National Convention to improve awareness and education about the importance of organ donation across Canada.

=== Telemiracle ===
Telemiracle is a telethon organized by the Kinsmen and Kinettes in Saskatchewan, Canada, for the benefit of the Kinsmen Foundation, a Kin Canada affiliate in Saskatchewan. Initially broadcast on both CTV and CBC affiliates in Saskatchewan, it is now broadcast, commercial-free, exclusively on the province's CTV stations.

The first telethon, in 1977, raised more than CAD $1 million, which at the time was considered a record for per capita telethon fund-raising in a 20-hour period (the province had a population of only about 1 million people at the time). The telethon passed the $2 million mark for the first time in 1983. And in recent years, the telethon has routinely raised between $3.0 and $5.0 million each year.

== Cultural references ==
- A late hockey player’s “picture in a case in the Kinsmen’s Rink” is mentioned in the folk song “Glory Bound” on the album My Skies by James Keelaghan.

== See also ==
- Harold A. Rogers
