= Historical rankings of prime ministers of Canada =

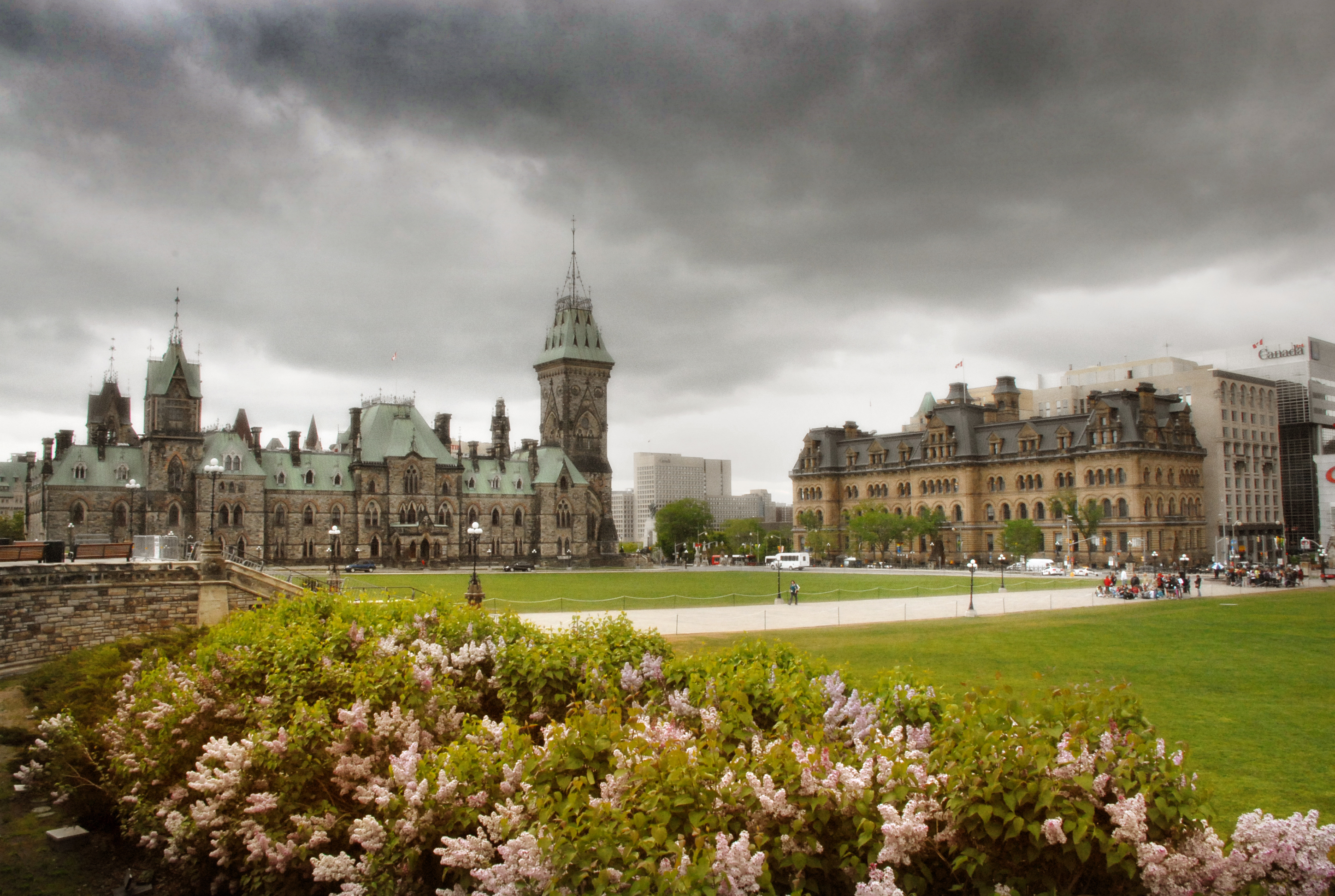
East Block (left) and the Office of the Prime Minister and Privy Council (right) have housed the office of the prime minister since Canadian Confederation, the former from 1867 to 1977 and the latter since 1977.

Surveys have been conducted to construct historical rankings of individuals who have served as prime minister of Canada. These ranking systems are usually based on surveys of academic historians, economists and political scientists. The rankings focus on the achievements, leadership qualities, failures and faults in office.

== Expert survey results ==
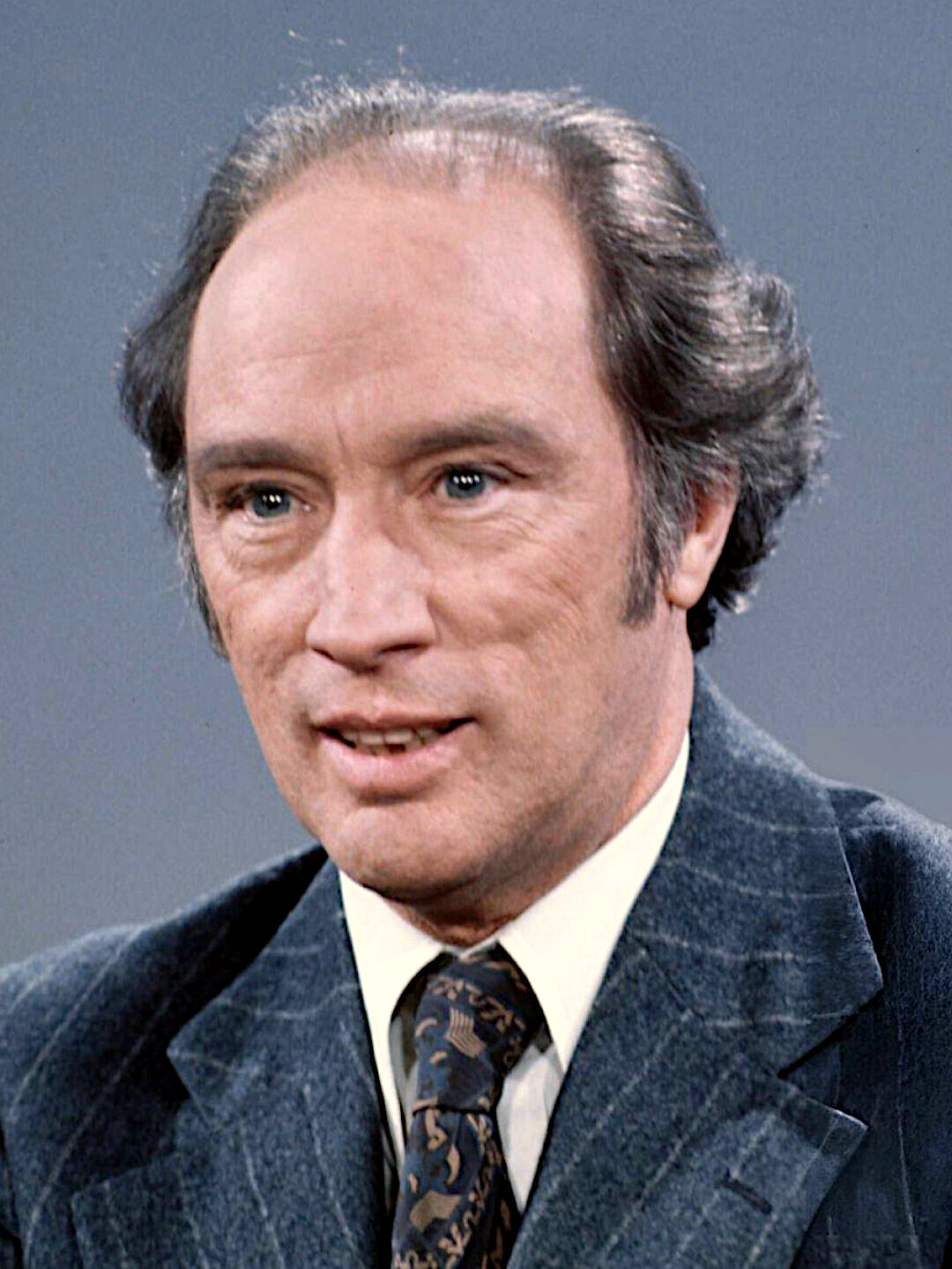
Pierre Trudeau is often ranked as the best prime minister since 1968.

Canadian custom is to count by the individuals who were prime minister, not by terms. Since Confederation, 24 prime ministers have been "called upon" by the governor general to form 30 Canadian ministries.

Legend
first quartile
second quartile
third quartile
fourth quartile

Note: Click the "sort" icon at the head of each column to view the rankings for each survey in numerical order.

Sequence (Note: Sequence listed by first term as prime minister.)	Prime Minister	Political party	Maclean's 1997	Maclean's 2011	Maclean's 2016	Aggregate (Note: Aggregate of all polls in the table using Copeland's method.)	Time in office (rank)
1	Sir John A. Macdonald	Conservative	2	2	3	03	2
2	Alexander Mackenzie	Liberal	11	13	13	13	14
3	Sir John Abbott (Note: Served less than 2 years, 3 months as prime minister, while all others served for more than 4 years, 11 months. There is a strong correlation between time served in office and the poll rankings: the bottom quartile of the aggregate poll rankings are all in the bottom quartile of time served in office. Similarly, the top four prime ministers in terms of aggregate rankings are in the top four of time spent in office.)	Conservative	17	19	20	20	18
4	Sir John Thompson	Conservative	10	14	16	15	16
5	Sir Mackenzie Bowell	Conservative	19	21	21	22	19
6	Sir Charles Tupper	Conservative	16	18	19	19	23
7	Sir Wilfrid Laurier	Liberal	3	1	2	02	4
8	Sir Robert Borden	Conservative, Unionist	7	8	9	08	9
9	Arthur Meighen	Conservative	14	16	17	17	17
10	William Lyon Mackenzie King	Liberal	1	3	1	01	1
11	R. B. Bennett	Conservative	12	12	14	14	12
12	Louis St. Laurent	Liberal	4	7	6	06	10
13	John George Diefenbaker	Progressive Conservative	13	10	12	12	11
14	Lester B. Pearson	Liberal	6	4	5	05	13
15	Pierre Elliott Trudeau	Liberal	5	5	4	04	3
16	Joe Clark	Progressive Conservative	15	17	18	18	20
17	John Turner	Liberal	18	20	22	21	22
18	Brian Mulroney	Progressive Conservative	8	9	8	09	8
19	Kim Campbell	Progressive Conservative	20	22	23	23	21
20	Jean Chrétien	Liberal	9 (Note: Ranking calculated before the prime minister had left office.)	6	7	07	5
21	Paul Martin	Liberal	—	15	15	16	15
22	Stephen Harper	Conservative	—	11	11	11	6
23	Justin Trudeau	Liberal	—	—	10	10	7

== By public approval rating ==
The following is a list of prime ministers of Canada by their highest and lowest approval rating during their term. The approval rating system came into effect when John Diefenbaker was prime minister (1957–1963).

=== Highest approval rating ===
1. Mark Carney — 70% (September 2026)
2. Jean Chrétien — 66% (September 1994)
3. Justin Trudeau — 65% (September 2016)
4. John Diefenbaker — 64% (June 1958)
5. Stephen Harper — 64% (March 2006)
6. Brian Mulroney — 61% (June 1985)
7. Paul Martin — 56% (September 2004)
8. Lester B. Pearson — 56% (January 1966)
9. Pierre Trudeau — 55% (September 1972)
10. Kim Campbell — 53% (July 1993)

Note: Ratings are up to date as of September 10, 2026.
Legend: Conservative Liberal Progressive Conservative

=== Lowest approval rating ===
1. Brian Mulroney — 12% (November 1992)
2. Justin Trudeau — 21% (January 2025)
3. Stephen Harper — 23% (May 2013)
4. Joe Clark — 24% (January 1980)
5. Pierre Trudeau — 25% (September 1982)
6. John Diefenbaker — 34% (March 1963)
7. Jean Chrétien — 36% (June 2000)
8. Paul Martin — 41% (June 2005)
9. Lester B. Pearson — 41% (September 1965)
10. Mark Carney — 41% (March 2025)

Note: Ratings are up to date as of September 10, 2026.
Legend: Conservative Liberal Progressive Conservative

== Other surveys ==
=== Pre-2003 ===
The Institute for Research on Public Policy undertook a survey to rank the prime ministers who had served in the 50 years preceding 2003. They ranked those nine prime ministers as follows:

1. Pearson
2. Mulroney
3. Pierre Trudeau
4. St. Laurent
5. Chrétien
6. Diefenbaker
7. Clark ^
8. Turner ^
9. Campbell ^

^ Served less than 10 months as prime minister, while all others served for more than 4 years, 11 months.

=== 2016 Maclean's short vs. long-serving prime ministers ===
In October 2016, Maclean's again ranked the prime ministers, this time splitting them into two lists. The long-serving prime ministers were ranked as follows:

Long-serving	Short-term
1. King	1. Martin
2. Laurier	2. Thompson
3. Macdonald	3. Meighen
4. Pierre Trudeau	4. Clark
5. Pearson	5. Tupper
6. St. Laurent	6. Abbott
7. Chrétien	7. Bowell
8. Mulroney	8. Turner
9. Borden	9. Campbell
10. Harper	—
11. Diefenbaker	—
12. Mackenzie	—
13. Bennett	—

=== Research Co. 2020s Surveys ===
==== 2023 ====
The highest percentage of respondents (38%) said Justin Trudeau was the worst prime minister since 1968, 14% said Stephen Harper, 7% said Pierre Trudeau, and 6% said Kim Campbell. For best prime minister since 1968, Pierre Trudeau received the highest percentage (18%), Stephen Harper second (16%), Brian Mulroney third (15%), and Justin Trudeau fourth (10%).

==== 2026 ====
Conducted on April 11–13, 2026, respondents were asked to select four individuals they considered the best and worst from a list of all 24 officeholders since Confederation.

===== Best prime ministers =====
Six prime ministers were identified by more than 20% of respondents as among the best: Pierre Trudeau (30%), Mark Carney (29%), Stephen Harper (29%), John A. Macdonald (27%), Jean Chrétien (27%), and Brian Mulroney (23%).

Older respondents more frequently selected Pierre Trudeau and Mulroney, while younger cohorts showed higher support for more recent leaders, including Carney and Justin Trudeau. Regional differences were also observed, with Macdonald leading in Ontario, Chrétien in Quebec, and Carney in Atlantic Canada.

===== Worst prime ministers =====
Justin Trudeau was selected by 47% of respondents, followed by Harper and Pierre Trudeau (23% each), Carney (21%), and Kim Campbell (20%). Justin Trudeau ranked as the most frequently selected “worst” prime minister across all age groups and regions, with higher proportions in Alberta and Ontario.

== See also ==
- List of prime ministers of Canada
- The Greatest Canadian, 2004 TV series

Other countries

- Historical rankings of prime ministers of Australia
- Historical rankings of chancellors of Germany
- Historical rankings of prime ministers of the Netherlands
- Historical rankings of prime ministers of the United Kingdom
- Historical rankings of presidents of the United States
