= List of prime ministers of Edward VII =

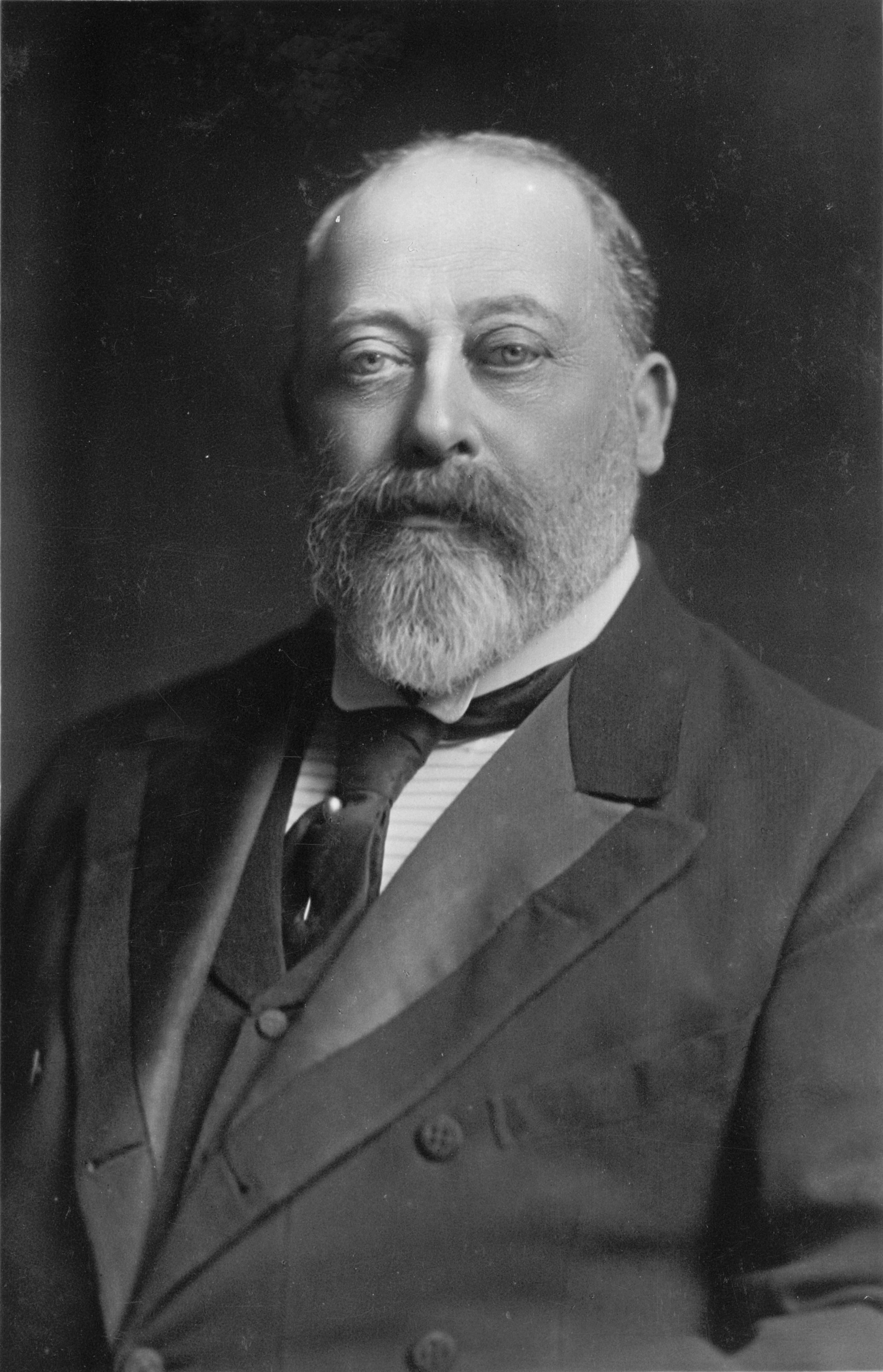
Edward VII

King Edward VII was the monarch of the United Kingdom of Great Britain and Ireland and of the British Empire from 22 January 1901 until his death on 6 May 1910.

During his reign Edward was served by a total of 13 prime ministers; 5 from Australia, 4 from the United Kingdom, 3 from New Zealand, and 1 from the Dominion of Canada.

== Australia ==
Portrait	Name	Term of office	
	Sir Edmund Barton	22 January 1901	24 September 1903
	Alfred Deakin	24 September 1903	27 April 1904
	Alfred Deakin	5 July 1905	13 November 1908
	Alfred Deakin	2 June 1909	29 April 1910
	Chris Watson	27 April 1904	18 August 1904
	Sir George Reid	18 August 1904	5 July 1905
	Andrew Fisher	13 November 1908	2 June 1909
	Andrew Fisher	29 April 1910	6 May 1910

== Canada ==
Portrait	Name	Term of office	
	Sir Wilfrid Laurier	22 January 1901	6 May 1910

== Cape Colony ==
Portrait	Name	Term of office	
	Gordon Sprigg	22 January 1901	21 February 1904
	Leander Starr Jameson	22 February 1904	2 February 1908
	John X. Merriman	3 February 1908	6 May 1910

== Newfoundland ==
Portrait	Name	Term of office	
	Robert Bond	22 January 1901	2 March 1909
	Edward Morris	2 March 1909	6 May 1910

== New Zealand ==
Portrait	Name	Term of office	
	Richard Seddon	22 January 1901	10 June 1906
	William Hall-Jones	10 June 1906	6 August 1906
	Joseph Ward	6 August 1906	6 May 1910

== United Kingdom ==
Portrait	Name	Term of office	
	Robert Gascoyne-Cecil; The Marquess of Salisbury	22 January 1901	11 July 1902
	Arthur Balfour	12 July 1902	4 December 1905
	Sir Henry Campbell-Bannerman	5 December 1905	5 April 1908
	H. H. Asquith	5 April 1908	6 May 1910

== See also ==
- British Empire
- Constitutional monarchy
- Dominion
