= Historical rankings of prime ministers of Australia =

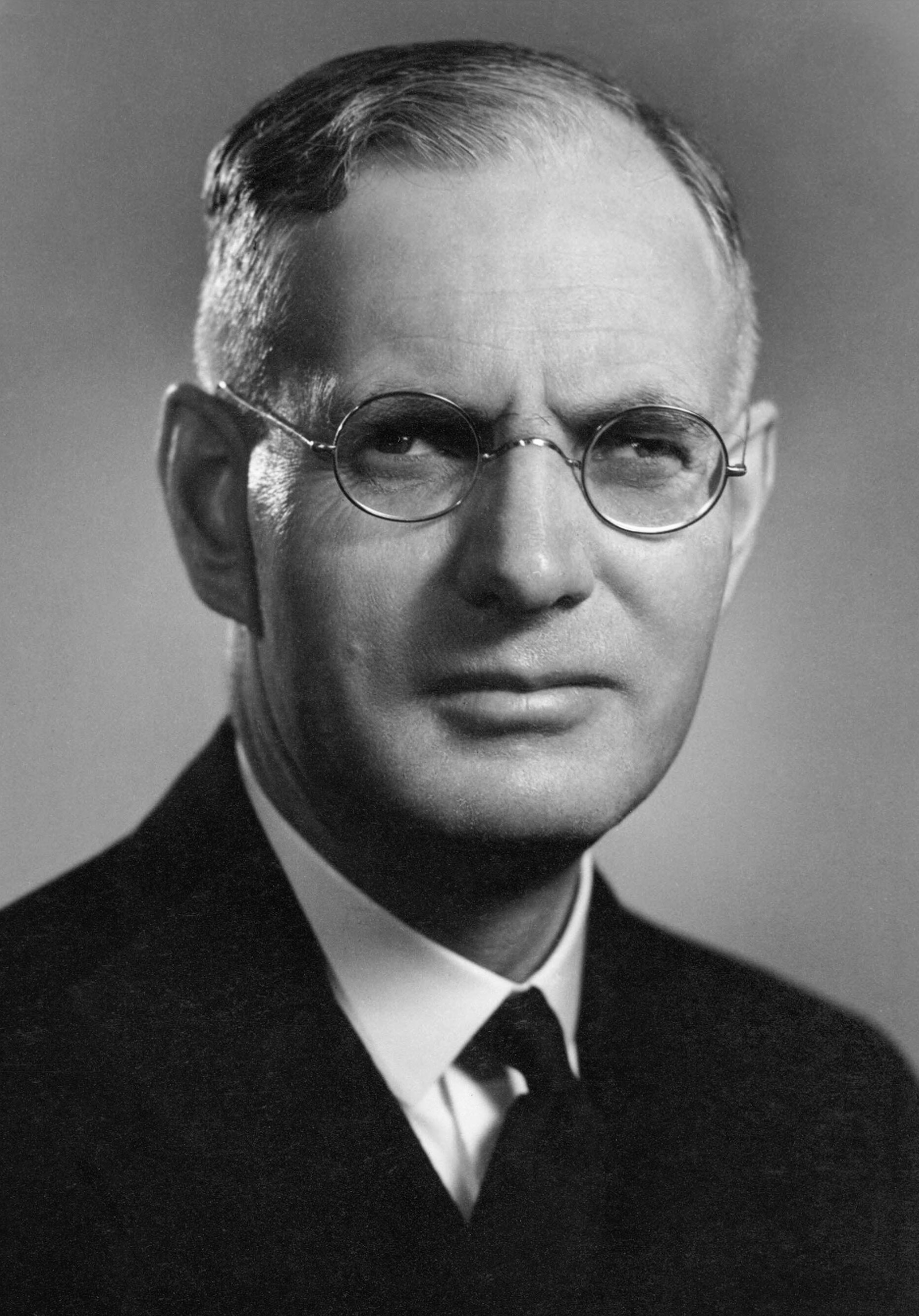
John Curtin (prime minister from 1941 to 1945) was ranked as Australia's greatest prime minister by surveys of academics conducted by Monash University in 2010 and 2020.

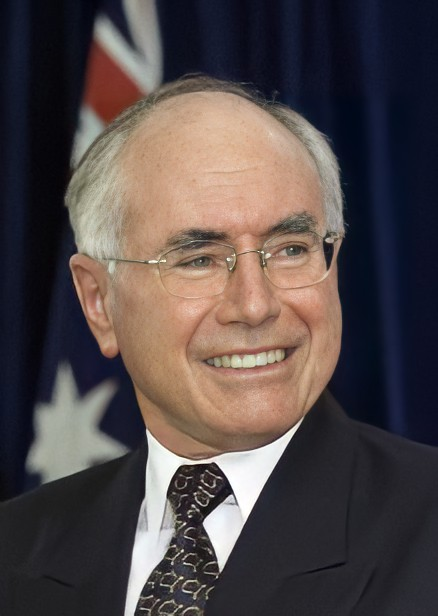
John Howard (prime minister from 1996 to 2007) is often considered to be Australia’s greatest modern prime minister.

Several surveys of academics and the general public have been conducted to evaluate and rank the performance of the prime ministers of Australia.

According to Paul Strangio of Monash University, there has been little academic interest in ranking Australian prime ministers, unlike the numerous surveys conducted on American presidents and British prime ministers. The few surveys that have been conducted have been quite unscientific, with respondents chosen at random and no efforts made to measure personal biases. Strangio notes that "the dominant methodology for studying the nation's leaders has been individual-centered biographies [...] the relatively small number of collective anthologies have treated each prime minister discretely rather than undertaking comparative analysis of their leadership performance, let alone contemplating qualities of greatness in the office".

== Surveys of academics ==
=== The Canberra Times (1992) ===
In 1992, The Canberra Times asked "almost 300 political scientists and historians at every Australian university" to nominate the five greatest prime ministers in Australian history; 143 responded. Five points were awarded to the prime minister each respondent judged to be the greatest, and so on down to one point for the fifth-greatest prime minister; some respondents awarded half points. Ben Chifley received the most overall points in the survey (and was judged to be the overall winner), although Alfred Deakin was nominated as the greatest prime minister by the most respondents. The four shortest-serving prime ministers were excluded from consideration, as well as the serving prime minister, Paul Keating. The total number of points was not published for prime ministers ranked outside the ten (except for those who received no points), only the order.

Prime Minister	Total points	"Greatest" votes
Ben Chifley	413.5	30
John Curtin	355.5	36
Alfred Deakin	351	43
Gough Whitlam	272	18
Robert Menzies	231.5	5
Billy Hughes	115	4
Bob Hawke	55.5	0
Andrew Fisher	51	4
Malcolm Fraser	36	0
James Scullin	30	2
Edmund Barton	Not further specified (1–29)	1
John Gorton	Not further specified (1–29)	0
Joseph Lyons	Not further specified (1–29)	0
Chris Watson	Not further specified (1–29)	0
Stanley Bruce	Not further specified (1–29)	0
Joseph Cook	0	0
Harold Holt	0	0
William McMahon	0	0
George Reid	0	0

=== The Australian Financial Review (2001) ===
In 2001, to commemorate the centenary of federation, The Australian Financial Review asked six historians to answer the question "who were the best five and who were the worst five prime ministers since 1901?". Five points were awarded to each historian's choice as the best and worst prime minister, and so on down to one point for the fifth-best and fifth-worst prime ministers. Alfred Deakin was a unanimous choice as Australia's best prime minister, winning full votes from each selector; Robert Menzies also appeared on every "best" list. No one prime minister appeared on all six "worst" lists, although William McMahon appeared on five and James Scullin on four. Several prime ministers appeared on both "best" and "worst" lists, sometimes from the same selector. Stuart Macintyre considered Menzies to be Australia's second-best prime minister for his 1949–66 term, but also the fifth-worst, for his 1939–41 term. Likewise, Humphrey McQueen considered Gough Whitlam to be both the fifth-best and the fourth-worst, describing him as a "curate's egg". Macintyre was the only respondent to award half-points, ranking Whitlam and Paul Keating as the equal fifth-best prime ministers. The three caretaker prime ministers were excluded from consideration, as well as the serving prime minister, John Howard.

Prime Minister	"Best" points	"Worst" points
Alfred Deakin	30	0
Robert Menzies	19	1
John Curtin	14	0
Ben Chifley	9	0
Gough Whitlam	4.5	4
Stanley Bruce	4	6
Andrew Fisher	3	1
Billy Hughes	3	5
Bob Hawke	3	0
Paul Keating	0.5	4
Arthur Fadden	0	0
Malcolm Fraser	0	0
Edmund Barton	0	1
Joseph Lyons	0	1
Chris Watson	0	4
John Gorton	0	5
Harold Holt	0	7
Joseph Cook	0	8
James Scullin	0	12
George Reid	0	13
William McMahon	0	18

The participants in the survey were Geoffrey Bolton (ECU), Graeme Davison (Monash), Ian Hancock (ANU), Stuart Macintyre (Melbourne), Humphrey McQueen (freelance), and Clem Lloyd (Wollongong). Geoffrey Blainey was invited to participate, but declined.

=== The Age (2004) ===
In 2004, The Age asked fifteen historians and political commentators to rank Australia's eleven prime ministers from John Curtin onwards (i.e., since 1941). Eleven points were awarded to the prime minister each respondent judged to be the greatest, and so on down to one point for the worst prime minister; some respondents awarded half points. John Curtin received the most overall points in the survey, as well as being named the greatest prime minister by the most respondents (exactly one-third of the total). William McMahon received the lowest possible ranking from all but one respondent. The two caretaker prime ministers during that time were excluded from consideration, but the serving prime minister, John Howard, was included.

Prime Minister	Total points	"Greatest" votes
John Curtin	146	5
Robert Menzies	141.5	4.5
Bob Hawke	133.5	3
Ben Chifley	111.5	2.5
John Howard	110.5	0
Gough Whitlam	92.5	0
Paul Keating	73.5	0
Malcolm Fraser	73	0
John Gorton	55	0
Harold Holt	36	0
William McMahon	17	0

The participants in the survey were Judith Brett (La Trobe), Greg Craven (Curtin), David Day (La Trobe), Michael Duffy (freelance), Brian Galligan (Melbourne), Ian Hancock (ANU), John Hirst (La Trobe), Carol Johnson (Adelaide), Stuart Macintyre (Melbourne), Alistair Mant (freelance), Andrew Parkin (Flinders), Tom Stannage (Curtin), Paul Strangio (Monash), James Walter (Monash), and Patrick Weller (Griffith). Geoffrey Blainey, Marian Simms, and several others were invited to participate, but declined.

=== Monash University (2010) ===
In 2010, a team of researchers from Monash University asked "145 academics that were teaching or researching in the fields of Australian politics or history" to place Australia's prime ministers in five categories; 40 responded. Five points were awarded to prime ministers judged "outstanding", four for those considered "good", three for "average", two for "below average", and one for "failure". The three caretaker prime ministers —Earle Page, Frank Forde, and John McEwen— were excluded from consideration, as was the then–serving prime minister, Julia Gillard. John Curtin received the highest average rating, 4.78, and he was the only prime minister to whom no respondents gave a rating lower than "good".

Rank	Prime Minister	Average score
1	John Curtin	4.78
2	Bob Hawke	4.46
3	Alfred Deakin	4.45
4	Ben Chifley	4.41
5	Robert Menzies	4.35
6	Gough Whitlam	4.11
7	Andrew Fisher	3.78
8	Paul Keating	3.76
9	John Howard	3.68
10	Edmund Barton	3.35
11	Joseph Lyons	3.30
12	Chris Watson	3.23
13	Malcolm Fraser	3.19
14	Billy Hughes	3.13
15	Stanley Bruce	2.81
16	John Gorton	2.76
17	Kevin Rudd	2.73
18	Harold Holt	2.62
19	George Reid	2.60
20	James Scullin	2.51
21	Joseph Cook	2.30
22	Arthur Fadden	2.01
23	William McMahon	1.27

=== Monash University (2020) ===
In 2020, researchers from Monash University replicated the 2010 survey, and asked 121 "scholars working in the fields of Australian politics/history" to place Australia's prime ministers in five categories; 66 participated. As with the previous survey, five points were awarded to prime ministers judged "outstanding", four for those considered "good", three for "average", two for "below average", and one for "failure". New additions to the survey included Julia Gillard, the second tenure of Kevin Rudd, Tony Abbott, and Malcolm Turnbull. The three caretaker prime ministers were excluded from consideration, as was the then–serving prime minister, Scott Morrison. Arthur Fadden, who was prime minister for 39 days and was present in the 2010 survey, was omitted from this survey. Of the 22 prime ministers ranked on both surveys, only four improved their standings (Keating, Watson, Reid, and Scullin) from 2010.

Rank	Prime Minister	Average score	Rank in 2010
1	John Curtin	4.69	1
2	Bob Hawke	4.63	2
3	Alfred Deakin	4.58	3
4	Ben Chifley	4.44	4
5=	Robert Menzies	4.12	5
5=	Paul Keating	4.12	8 ▲
7	Gough Whitlam	4.05	6 ▼
8	Andrew Fisher	3.96	7 ▼
9	John Howard	3.71	9
10	Edmund Barton	3.51	10
11	Chris Watson	3.26	12 ▲
12	Joseph Lyons	3.25	11 ▼
13	Julia Gillard	3.18	N/A
14	Malcolm Fraser	3.15	13 ▼
15	Billy Hughes	3.00	14 ▼
16	George Reid	2.96	19 ▲
17	James Scullin	2.81	20 ▲
18	Stanley Bruce	2.79	15 ▼
19	Harold Holt	2.74	18 ▼
20	John Gorton	2.63	16 ▼
21	Kevin Rudd	2.51	17 ▼
22	Joseph Cook	2.44	21 ▼
23	Malcolm Turnbull	2.15	N/A
24	Tony Abbott	1.37	N/A
25	William McMahon	1.35	23 ▼

== Rankings by highest approval rating ==
It is possible to compare the highest approval ratings achieved by prime ministers in various opinion polls.

=== Nielsen Poll ===
According to the Nielsen Poll (available since 1972), Bob Hawke had the highest approval rating in November 1984, with 75%, and the lowest was William McMahon, with a 34% approval rating.

Highest Nielsen Poll ratings for each prime minister since 1972:

1. Bob Hawke – 75% (November 1984)
2. Kevin Rudd – 74% (March 2009)
3. John Howard – 67% (January 2005)
4. Gough Whitlam – 62% (February 1973)
5. Malcolm Fraser – 56% (April 1976 and May 1978)
6. Julia Gillard – 56% (July 2010)
7. Tony Abbott – 47% (November 2013)
8. Paul Keating – 40% (November 1994)
9. William McMahon – 34% (November 1972)

William McMahon ended 1971 with an approval rating of 36.4%. By the end of 1972, his popularity had sunk to 34%, and he was defeated by Gough Whitlam in the 1972 election.

=== Newspoll ===
==== Highest satisfaction rating ====
According to Newspoll (available since 1985), the highest satisfaction rating of any prime minister was Kevin Rudd's at 71% in August 2008, while Paul Keating has had the lowest high-mark satisfaction rating at 43%.

Voters are asked the question: 'Are you satisfied or dissatisfied with the way -name- is doing his/her job as Prime Minister?'

1. Kevin Rudd – 71% (18–20 April 2008)
2. Scott Morrison – 68% (22–25 April 2020)
3. John Howard – 67% (10–12 May 1996)
4. Bob Hawke – 62% (24–26 January 1987)
5. Anthony Albanese – 62% (30 November–3 December 2022)
6. Malcolm Turnbull – 60% (19–22 November 2015)
7. Julia Gillard – 50% (18–20 February 2011)
8. Tony Abbott – 47% (25–27 October 2013)
9. Paul Keating – 43% (2–18 April 1993, 16–18 September 1994 & 18–20 November 1994)

==== Lowest satisfaction rating ====
Since Newspoll began in 1985, the lowest satisfaction rating of any prime minister is by far Paul Keating's at 17% in August 1993, with a 6% difference between Keating and the nearest low rating of Julia Gillard at 23% in September 2011.

1. Paul Keating – 17% (20–22 August 1993)
2. Julia Gillard – 23% (2–4 September 2011)
3. Tony Abbott – 24% (6–8 February 2015)
4. Bob Hawke – 27% (29 November – 8 December 1991)
5. John Howard – 28% (26–29 June 1998 & 9–11 March 2001)
6. Malcolm Turnbull – 29% (20–23 October 2016 & 23–26 February 2017)
7. Kevin Rudd – 32% (30 August – 1 September 2013)
8. Anthony Albanese – 36% (1–4 June 2026)
9. Scott Morrison – 37% (8–11 January 2020)

== Public opinion polls ==
=== JWS research ===
In May 2011, John Scales of JWS research polled 2141 people in the 10 most marginal Labor seats and the 10 most marginal Coalition seats.

Asked "which, of the past five, had been the best government for Australia?", responses were as follows:

- 50% nominated the Howard government (1996–2007)
- 13% for the Keating government (1991–1996)
- 13% for the Hawke government (1983–1991)
- 12% for the Rudd government (2007–2010)
- 4% nominated the Gillard government (2010–2013)
- 8% responded as "unsure"

In all, 50% of all respondents nominated a Liberal Party government, with 42% nominating the Labor Party. At the time of the survey, the federal government was led by the Labor Party.

== See also ==
- Historical rankings of prime ministers of Canada
- Historical rankings of chancellors of Germany
- Historical rankings of prime ministers of the Netherlands
- Historical rankings of prime ministers of the United Kingdom
- Historical rankings of presidents of the United States
