= Religious affiliation in the United States House of Representatives =

This article covers the religious affiliation in the United States House of Representatives.

While the religious preference of elected officials is by no means an indication of their allegiance nor necessarily reflective of their voting record, the religious affiliation of prominent members of all three branches of government is a source of commentary and discussion among the media and public. The topic is also of interest to religious groups and the general public who may appeal to representatives of their denomination on religious or moral issues facing the House of Representatives.

The following list reports the religious affiliation of the members of the United States House of Representatives in the 119th Congress. In most cases, besides specific sources, the current representatives' religious affiliations are those mentioned in regular researches by the Pew Forum on Religion and Public Life at the Pew Research Center.

== Christians (370) ==
370 members are Christians (160 Democrats, 209 Republicans, 1 Independent)

=== Protestants (233) ===
233 members are Protestants (90 Democrats, 142 Republicans, 1 Independent)

==== Unspecified Protestants (84) ====
84 members are Protestants, but haven't specified their denomination (22 Democrats, 62 Republicans)

Name	Party	District	Notes
Shomari Figures	Democratic	Alabama's 2nd	
Gary Palmer	Republican	Alabama's 6th	
Nick Begich III	Republican	Alaska's at-large	
Eli Crane	Republican	Arizona's 2nd	
Juan Ciscomani	Republican	Arizona's 6th	
John Garamendi	Democratic	California's 8th	
Josh Harder	Democratic	California's 9th	
Vince Fong	Republican	California's 20th	
Jay Obernolte	Republican	California's 23rd	
Young Kim	Republican	California's 40th	
Maxine Waters	Democratic	California's 43rd	
Joe Neguse	Democratic	Colorado's 2nd	
Gabe Evans	Republican	Colorado's 8th	
Kat Cammack	Republican	Florida's 3rd	
Aaron Bean	Republican	Florida's 4th	
Cory Mills	Republican	Florida's 7th	
Laurel Lee	Republican	Florida's 15th	
Greg Steube	Republican	Florida's 17th	
Byron Donalds	Republican	Florida's 19th	
Brian Mast	Republican	Florida's 21st	
María Elvira Salazar	Republican	Florida's 27th	Lapsed Catholic
Lucy McBath	Democratic	Georgia's 6th	
Rich McCormick	Republican	Georgia's 7th	
Ed Case	Democratic	Hawaii's 1st	
Jill Tokuda	Democratic	Hawaii's 2nd	
Randy Feenstra	Republican	Iowa's 4th	
Russ Fulcher	Republican	Idaho's 1st	
Mike Quigley	Democratic	Illinois's 5th	
Lauren Underwood	Democratic	Illinois's 14th	
Mary Miller	Republican	Illinois's 15th	
Eric Sorensen	Democratic	Illinois's 17th	
Rudy Yakym	Republican	Indiana's 2nd	
Jim Baird	Republican	Indiana's 4th	
Erin Houchin	Republican	Indiana's 9th	
Clay Higgins	Republican	Louisiana's 3rd	
Glenn Ivey	Democratic	Maryland's 4th	
Katherine Clark	Democratic	Massachusetts's 5th	
Seth Moulton	Democratic	Massachusetts's 6th	
John Moolenaar	Republican	Michigan's 2nd	
Tim Walberg	Republican	Michigan's 5th	attends churches affiliated with the Church of the United Brethren in Christ
John James	Republican	Michigan's 10th	
Haley Stevens	Democratic	Michigan's 11th	
Kelly Morrison	Democratic	Minnesota's 3rd	
Wesley Bell	Democratic	Missouri's 1st	
Mark Alford	Republican	Missouri's 4th	
Eric Burlison	Republican	Missouri's 7th	
Trent Kelly	Republican	Mississippi's 1st	
Don Bacon	Republican	Nebraska's 2nd	
Adrian Smith	Republican	Nebraska's 3rd	
Mark Amodei	Republican	Nevada's 2nd	
Grace Meng	Democratic	New York's 6th	
Yvette Clarke	Democratic	New York's 9th	
Ritchie Torres	Democratic	New York's 15th	
Nick Langworthy	Republican	New York's 23rd	
Addison McDowell	Republican	North Carolina's 6th	
Richard Hudson	Republican	North Carolina's 9th	Identifies as "Christian". Attends Crossroads Church (Concord, North Carolina), which is a United Methodist congregation.
Pat Harrigan	Republican	North Carolina's 10th	
Jim Jordan	Republican	Ohio's 4th	Fundamentalist Conservative Christian; Grace Bible Church at Urbana
Warren Davidson	Republican	Ohio's 8th	
Mike Turner	Republican	Ohio's 10th	
Troy Balderson	Republican	Ohio's 12th	
Kevin Hern	Republican	Oklahoma's 1st	
Josh Brecheen	Republican	Oklahoma's 2nd	
Ryan Mackenzie	Republican	Pennsylvania's 7th	
Scott Perry	Republican	Pennsylvania's 10th	
Summer Lee	Democratic	Pennsylvania's 12th	
Guy Reschenthaler	Republican	Pennsylvania's 14th	
Glenn Thompson	Republican	Pennsylvania's 15th	
William Timmons	Republican	South Carolina's 4th	
Dusty Johnson	Republican	South Dakota's at-large	
Andy Ogles	Republican	Tennessee's 5th	
Mark E. Green	Republican	Tennessee's 7th	
Keith Self	Republican	Texas's 3rd	
Jake Ellzey	Republican	Texas's 6th	
Morgan Luttrell	Republican	Texas's 8th	
August Pfluger	Republican	Texas's 11th	
Troy Nehls	Republican	Texas's 22nd	
Roger Williams	Republican	Texas's 25th	
Brandon Gill	Republican	Texas's 26th	
Michael Cloud	Republican	Texas's 27th	
Morgan Griffith	Republican	Virginia's 9th	
Marilyn Strickland	Democratic	Washington's 10th	
Derrick Van Orden	Republican	Wisconsin's 3rd	
Tom Tiffany	Republican	Wisconsin's 7th	

==== Baptists (63) ====
63 members are Baptists (26 Democrats, 37 Republicans)

Name	Party	District	Notes
Barry Moore	Republican	Alabama's 1st	
Mike Rogers	Republican	Alabama's 3rd	
Dale Strong	Republican	Alabama's 5th	
Rick Crawford	Republican	Arkansas's 1st	
Steve Womack	Republican	Arkansas's 3rd	
Bruce Westerman	Republican	Arkansas's 4th	
Tom McClintock	Republican	California's 5th	
Mike Haridopolos	Republican	Florida's 8th	
Maxwell Frost	Democratic	Florida's 10th	
Daniel Webster	Republican	Florida's 11th	
Vern Buchanan	Republican	Florida's 16th	
Sanford Bishop	Democratic	Georgia's 2nd	
Austin Scott	Republican	Georgia's 8th	
Andrew Clyde	Republican	Georgia's 9th	
Barry Loudermilk	Republican	Georgia's 11th	
Jonathan Jackson	Democratic	Illinois's 1st	
Danny Davis	Democratic	Illinois's 7th	
Mike Bost	Republican	Illinois's 12th	
Marlin Stutzman	Republican	Indiana's 3rd	
James Comer	Republican	Kentucky's 1st	
Hal Rogers	Republican	Kentucky's 5th	
Troy Carter	Democratic	Louisiana's 2nd	
Mike Johnson	Republican	Louisiana's 4th	
Cleo Fields	Democratic	Louisiana's 6th	
Steny Hoyer	Democratic	Maryland's 5th	
Kweisi Mfume	Democratic	Maryland's 7th	
Ayanna Pressley	Democratic	Massachusetts's 7th	
Sam Graves	Republican	Missouri's 6th	
Michael Guest	Republican	Mississippi's 3rd	
Mike Ezell	Republican	Mississippi's 4th	
Troy Downing	Republican	Montana's 2nd	
Valerie Foushee	Democratic	North Carolina's 4th	
David Rouzer	Republican	North Carolina's 7th	
Mark Harris	Republican	North Carolina's 8th	Senior pastor of Trinity Baptist Church in Mooresville, affiliated with the BSCNC. Former senior pastor of First Baptist Church in Charlotte.
Alma Adams	Democratic	North Carolina's 12th	
Brad Knott	Republican	North Carolina's 13th	
Tim Moore	Republican	North Carolina's 14th	
LaMonica McIver	Democratic	New Jersey's 10th	
Bonnie Watson Coleman	Democratic	New Jersey's 12th	
Steven Horsford	Democratic	Nevada's 4th	
Hakeem Jeffries	Democratic	New York's 8th	
Joyce Beatty	Democratic	Ohio's 3rd	
Shontel Brown	Democratic	Ohio's 11th	
Emilia Sykes	Democratic	Ohio's 13th	
Frank Lucas	Republican	Oklahoma's 3rd	
Janelle Bynum	Democratic	Oregon's 5th	
Dwight Evans	Democratic	Pennsylvania's 3rd	
Sheri Biggs	Republican	South Carolina's 3rd	
Russell Fry	Republican	South Carolina's 7th	
Diana Harshbarger	Republican	Tennessee's 1st	
Nathaniel Moran	Republican	Texas's 1st	
Al Green	Democratic	Texas's 9th	
Randy Weber	Republican	Texas's 14th	
Chip Roy	Republican	Texas's 21st	
Jasmine Crockett	Democratic	Texas's 30th	
Marc Veasey	Democratic	Texas's 33rd	
Brian Babin	Republican	Texas's 36th	
Wesley Hunt	Republican	Texas's 38th	
John McGuire	Republican	Virginia's 5th	
Gwen Moore	Democratic	Wisconsin's 4th	
Carol Miller	Republican	West Virginia's 1st	

==== Methodists (22) ====
22 members are Methodists (15 Democrats, 7 Republicans)

Name	Party	District	Notes
Terri Sewell	Democratic	Alabama's 7th	African Methodist Episcopal
Doris Matsui	Democratic	California's 7th	
Mark Takano	Democratic	California's 39th	
Jahana Hayes	Democratic	Connecticut's 5th	
Buddy Carter	Republican	Georgia's 1st	
Nikema Williams	Democratic	Georgia's 5th	
Mike Collins	Republican	Georgia's 10th	
Rick W. Allen	Republican	Georgia's 12th	
Delia Ramirez	Democratic	Illinois's 3rd	
Thomas Massie	Republican	Kentucky's 4th	
Johnny Olszewski	Democratic	Maryland's 2nd	
Emanuel Cleaver	Democratic	Missouri's 5th	Ordained minister of the United Methodist Church
Bennie Thompson	Democratic	Mississippi's 2nd	
Gregory Meeks	Democratic	New York's 5th	
Tom Cole	Republican	Oklahoma's 4th	
Jim Clyburn	Democratic	South Carolina's 6th	
Dan Crenshaw	Republican	Texas's 2nd	
Lizzie Fletcher	Democratic	Texas's 7th	
Pete Sessions	Republican	Texas's 17th	
Julie Johnson	Democratic	Texas's 32nd	
Lloyd Doggett	Democratic	Texas's 37th	
Rick Larsen	Democratic	Washington's 2nd	

==== Episcopalians (16) ====
16 members are Episcopalians (8 Democrats, 8 Republicans)

Name	Party	District	Notes
Julia Brownley	Democratic	California's 26th	
George T. Whitesides	Democratic	California's 27th	
Ken Calvert	Republican	California's 41st	
Dave Min	Democratic	California's 47th	
Frederica Wilson	Democratic	Florida's 24th	
Brian Jack	Republican	Georgia's 3rd	
Andy Barr	Republican	Kentucky's 6th	
Thomas Kean Jr.	Republican	New Jersey's 7th	
Scott DesJarlais	Republican	Tennessee's 4th	
Monica De La Cruz	Republican	Texas's 15th	
Beth Van Duyne	Republican	Texas's 24th	
Rob Wittman	Republican	Virginia's 1st	
Bobby Scott	Democratic	Virginia's 3rd	
Don Beyer	Democratic	Virginia's 8th	
Suzan DelBene	Democratic	Washington's 1st	
Adam Smith	Democratic	Washington's 9th	

==== Presbyterians (15) ====
15 members are Presbyterians (7 Democrats, 8 Republicans)

Name	Party	District	Notes
Diana DeGette	Democratic	Colorado's 1st	
Jim Himes	Democratic	Connecticut's 4th	
Sarah McBride	Democratic	Delaware's at-large	
Kathy Castor	Democratic	Florida's 14th	
Scott Franklin	Republican	Florida's 18th	
Morgan McGarvey	Democratic	Kentucky's 3rd	
Julia Letlow	Republican	Louisiana's 5th	
Claudia Tenney	Republican	New York's 24th	
Don Davis	Democratic	North Carolina's 1st	
Joe Wilson	Republican	South Carolina's 2nd	
Ralph Norman	Republican	South Carolina's 5th	
Tim Burchett	Republican	Tennessee's 2nd	
Jodey Arrington	Republican	Texas's 19th	
Jennifer McClellan	Democratic	Virginia's 4th	
Dan Newhouse	Republican	Washington's 4th	

==== Lutherans (14) ====
14 members are Lutherans (7 Democrats, 7 Republicans)

Name	Party	District	Notes
Zoe Lofgren	Democratic	California's 18th	
Sydney Kamlager-Dove	Democratic	California's 37th	
Scott Peters	Democratic	California's 50th	
Tracey Mann	Republican	Kansas's 1st	Pietist
Derek Schmidt	Republican	Kansas's 2nd	
Ron Estes	Republican	Kansas's 4th	
Chellie Pingree	Democratic	Maine's 1st	
Jack Bergman	Republican	Michigan's 1st	
Angie Craig	Democratic	Minnesota's 2nd	
Donald Norcross	Democratic	New Jersey's 1st	
Analilia Mejia	Democratic	New Jersey's 11th	
Lloyd Smucker	Republican	Pennsylvania's 11th	
John Carter	Republican	Texas's 31st	
Glenn Grothman	Republican	Wisconsin's 6th	

==== Non-denominational Protestants (10) ====
10 members are Non-denominational Protestants (3 Democrats, 6 Republicans, 1 Independent)

Name	Party	District	Notes
Kevin Kiley	Independent	California's 3rd	
Lauren Boebert	Republican	Colorado's 4th	
Jeff Crank	Republican	Colorado's 5th	
Jason Crow	Democratic	Colorado's 6th	
Robin Kelly	Democratic	Illinois's 2nd	
Ashley Hinson	Republican	Iowa's 2nd	
Chuck Edwards	Republican	North Carolina's 11th	
Nancy Mace	Republican	South Carolina's 1st	
Marie Gluesenkamp Perez	Democratic	Washington's 3rd	
Harriet Hageman	Republican	Wyoming's at-large	

==== Restorationist (4) ====
4 members are Restorationists (4 Republicans)

Name	Party	District	Notes
Lance Gooden	Republican	Texas's 5th	Churches of Christ
Brett Guthrie	Republican	Kentucky's 2nd	Churches of Christ
John Rose	Republican	Tennessee's 6th	Churches of Christ; Raised Southern Baptist. Classified as an "Unspecified Protestant" in the Pew Report.
Ronny Jackson	Republican	Texas's 13th	

==== Reformed (2) ====
2 members are Reformed (1 Democrat, 1 Republican)

Name	Party	District	Notes
Hillary Scholten	Democratic	Michigan's 3rd	Christian Reformed Church in North America
Bill Huizenga	Republican	Michigan's 4th	Christian Reformed Church in North America

==== Adventists (1) ====
1 members is a Seventh-day Adventist (1 Democrat)

Name	Party	District	Notes
Raul Ruiz	Democratic	California's 25th	

==== Pentecostals (1) ====
1 members is a Pentecostal (1 Republican)

Name	Party	District	Notes
Jason Smith	Republican	Missouri's 8th	Assemblies of God

==== Congregationalists (1) ====
1 members is a Congregationalist (1 Republican)

Name	Party	District	Notes
Robert Aderholt	Republican	Alabama's 4th	

=== Catholics (124) ===
124 members are Catholics (68 Democrats, 56 Republicans)

Name	Party	District	Notes
David Schweikert	Republican	Arizona's 1st	
Greg Stanton	Democratic	Arizona's 4th	
Paul Gosar	Republican	Arizona's 9th	
French Hill	Republican	Arkansas's 2nd	
Mike Thompson	Democratic	California's 4th	
Mark DeSaulnier	Democratic	California's 10th	
Nancy Pelosi	Democratic	California's 11th	
Kevin Mullin	Democratic	California's 15th	
Sam Liccardo	Democratic	California's 16th	
Jimmy Panetta	Democratic	California's 19th	
Jim Costa	Democratic	California's 21st	
David Valadao	Republican	California's 22nd	
Salud Carbajal	Democratic	California's 24th	
Luz Rivas	Democratic	California's 29th	
Gil Cisneros	Democratic	California's 31st	
Pete Aguilar	Democratic	California's 33rd	
Jimmy Gomez	Democratic	California's 34th	
Norma Torres	Democratic	California's 35th	
Ted Lieu	Democratic	California's 36th	
Linda Sánchez	Democratic	California's 38th	
Robert Garcia	Democratic	California's 42nd	
Nanette Barragán	Democratic	California's 44th	
Lou Correa	Democratic	California's 46th	
Juan Vargas	Democratic	California's 52nd	
Jeff Hurd	Republican	Colorado's 3rd	
John B. Larson	Democratic	Connecticut's 1st	
Joe Courtney	Democratic	Connecticut's 2nd	
Rosa DeLauro	Democratic	Connecticut's 3rd	
Neal Dunn	Republican	Florida's 2nd	
John Rutherford	Republican	Florida's 5th	
Darren Soto	Democratic	Florida's 9th	
Mario Díaz-Balart	Republican	Florida's 26th	
Carlos A. Giménez	Republican	Florida's 28th	
Jesús "Chuy" García	Democratic	Illinois's 4th	
Darin LaHood	Republican	Illinois's 16th	
Frank J. Mrvan	Democratic	Indiana's 1st	
Jefferson Shreve	Republican	Indiana's 6th	
Mark Messmer	Republican	Indiana's 8th	
Mariannette Miller-Meeks	Republican	Iowa's 1st	
Zach Nunn	Republican	Iowa's 3rd	
Steve Scalise	Republican	Louisiana's 1st	
Andy Harris	Republican	Maryland's 1st	
April McClain Delaney	Democratic	Maryland's 6th	
Richard Neal	Democratic	Massachusetts's 1st	
Jim McGovern	Democratic	Massachusetts's 2nd	
Lori Trahan	Democratic	Massachusetts's 3rd	
Stephen F. Lynch	Democratic	Massachusetts's 8th	
Bill Keating	Democratic	Massachusetts's 9th	
Debbie Dingell	Democratic	Michigan's 6th	
Tom Barrett	Republican	Michigan's 7th	
Kristen McDonald Rivet	Democratic	Michigan's 8th	
Lisa McClain	Republican	Michigan's 9th	
Brad Finstad	Republican	Minnesota's 1st	
Betty McCollum	Democratic	Minnesota's 4th	
Tom Emmer	Republican	Minnesota's 6th	
Michelle Fischbach	Republican	Minnesota's 7th	
Pete Stauber	Republican	Minnesota's 8th	
Ann Wagner	Republican	Missouri's 2nd	
Bob Onder	Republican	Missouri's 3rd	
Ryan Zinke	Republican	Montana's 1st	Previously was a Lutheran.
Mike Flood	Republican	Nebraska's 1st	
Susie Lee	Democratic	Nevada's 3rd	
Maggie Goodlander	Democratic	New Hampshire's 2nd	
Jeff Van Drew	Republican	New Jersey's 2nd	Former Democrat
Chris Smith	Republican	New Jersey's 4th	
Frank Pallone	Democratic	New Jersey's 6th	
Rob Menendez	Democratic	New Jersey's 8th	
Nellie Pou	Democratic	New Jersey's 9th	
Gabe Vasquez	Democratic	New Mexico's 2nd	
Teresa Leger Fernandez	Democratic	New Mexico's 3rd	
Nick LaLota	Republican	New York's 1st	
Andrew Garbarino	Republican	New York's 2nd	
Tom Suozzi	Democratic	New York's 3rd	
Laura Gillen	Democratic	New York's 4th	
Nydia Velázquez	Democratic	New York's 7th	
Adriano Espaillat	Democratic	New York's 13th	
Alexandria Ocasio-Cortez	Democratic	New York's 14th	
George Latimer	Democratic	New York's 16th	
Mike Lawler	Republican	New York's 17th	
Pat Ryan	Democratic	New York's 18th	
Paul Tonko	Democratic	New York's 20th	
Elise Stefanik	Republican	New York's 21st	
John Mannion	Democratic	New York's 22nd	
Joseph Morelle	Democratic	New York's 25th	
Tim Kennedy	Democratic	New York's 26th	
Greg Murphy	Republican	North Carolina's 3rd	
Virginia Foxx	Republican	North Carolina's 5th	
Julie Fedorchak	Republican	North Dakota's at-large	
Bob Latta	Republican	Ohio's 5th	
Michael Rulli	Republican	Ohio's 6th	
Marcy Kaptur	Democratic	Ohio's 9th	
David Joyce	Republican	Ohio's 14th	
Mike Carey	Republican	Ohio's 15th	
Stephanie Bice	Republican	Oklahoma's 5th	Convert
Cliff Bentz	Republican	Oregon's 2nd	
Val Hoyle	Democratic	Oregon's 4th	
Andrea Salinas	Democratic	Oregon's 6th	
Brian Fitzpatrick	Republican	Pennsylvania's 1st	
Brendan Boyle	Democratic	Pennsylvania's 2nd	
Madeleine Dean	Democratic	Pennsylvania's 4th	
Mary Gay Scanlon	Democratic	Pennsylvania's 5th	
Rob Bresnahan	Republican	Pennsylvania's 8th	
Dan Meuser	Republican	Pennsylvania's 9th	
John Joyce	Republican	Pennsylvania's 13th	
Mike Kelly	Republican	Pennsylvania's 16th	
Chris Deluzio	Democratic	Pennsylvania's 17th	
Gabe Amo	Democratic	Rhode Island's 1st	
Chuck Fleischmann	Republican	Tennessee's 3rd	
Pat Fallon	Republican	Texas's 4th	
Michael McCaul	Republican	Texas's 10th	
Veronica Escobar	Democratic	Texas's 16th	
Joaquin Castro	Democratic	Texas's 20th	
Henry Cuellar	Democratic	Texas's 28th	
Sylvia Garcia	Democratic	Texas's 29th	
Vicente Gonzalez	Democratic	Texas's 34th	
Greg Casar	Democratic	Texas's 35th	
Jen Kiggans	Republican	Virginia's 2nd	
Ben Cline	Republican	Virginia's 6th	
Michael Baumgartner	Republican	Washington's 5th	
Riley Moore	Republican	West Virginia's 2nd	
Bryan Steil	Republican	Wisconsin's 1st	
Scott L. Fitzgerald	Republican	Wisconsin's 5th	
Tony Wied	Republican	Wisconsin's 8th	

=== Eastern Orthodox (7) ===
7 members are Eastern Orthodox (2 Democrats, 5 Republicans)

==== Antiochian Orthodox (1) ====
1 members is Antiochian Orthodox (1 Republican)

Name	Party	District	Notes
Darrell Issa	Republican	California's 48th	

==== Greek Orthodox (5) ====
5 members are Greek Orthodox (3 Republicans; 2 Democrats)

Name	Party	District	Notes
Jimmy Patronis	Republican	Florida's 1st	
Gus Bilirakis	Republican	Florida's 12th	
Chris Pappas	Democratic	New Hampshire's 1st	
Nicole Malliotakis	Republican	New York's 11th	
Dina Titus	Democratic	Nevada's 1st	

==== Unspecified Orthodox (1) ====
1 member is Orthodox, but hasn't specified which Church (1 Republican)

Name	Party	District	Notes
Victoria Spartz	Republican	Indiana's 5th	

=== The Church of Jesus Christ of Latter-day Saints (6) ===
6 members are a part of The Church of Jesus Christ of Latter-day Saints (6 Republicans)

Name	Party	District	Notes
Andy Biggs	Republican	Arizona's 5th	
Mike Simpson	Republican	Idaho's 2nd	
Blake Moore	Republican	Utah's 1st	
Celeste Maloy	Republican	Utah's 2nd	
Mike Kennedy	Republican	Utah's 3rd	
Burgess Owens	Republican	Utah's 4th	

=== Messianic Jewish (1) ===
1 members is Messianic Jewish (1 Republican)

Name	Party	District	Notes
Anna Paulina Luna	Republican	Florida's 13th	

== Jewish (24) ==
24 members are Jewish (20 Democrats, 4 Republicans)

=== Reform Judaism (8) ===
8 members are Reform Jews (6 Democrats, 2 Republicans)

Name	Party	District	Notes
Josh Gottheimer	Democratic	New Jersey's 5th	
Suzanne Bonamici	Democratic	Oregon's 1st	By choice; she was raised Episcopalian and Unitarian.
Jared Moskowitz	Democratic	Florida's 23rd	
David Kustoff	Republican	Tennessee's 8th	
Steve Cohen	Democratic	Tennessee's 9th	
Craig Goldman	Republican	Texas's 12th	
Kim Schrier	Democratic	Washington's 8th	
Jamie Raskin	Democratic	Maryland's 8th	Also a Humanist

=== Conservative Judaism (6) ===
6 members are Conservative Jews (5 Democrats, 1 Republican)

Name	Party	District	Notes
Laura Friedman	Democratic	California's 30th	
Brad Sherman	Democratic	California's 32nd	
Sara Jacobs	Democratic	California's 51st	
Lois Frankel	Democratic	Florida's 22nd	
Debbie Wasserman Schultz	Democratic	Florida's 25th	
Max Miller	Republican	Ohio's 7th	

=== Non-denominational Judaism (2) ===
2 members are non-denominational Jews (2 Democrats)

Name	Party	District	Notes
Jerry Nadler	Democratic	New York's 12th	
Eugene Vindman	Democratic	Virginia's 7th	

=== Orthodox Judaism (1) ===
1 member is an Orthodox Jew (1 Republican)

Name	Party	District	Notes
Randy Fine	Republican	Florida's 6th	Grew up Reform and formally attended a Conservative synagogue. Currently attends a local Chabad-Lubavitch center

=== Unspecificed Judaism (7) ===
7 members are Jewish, but haven't specified their religious movement (7 Democrats)

Name	Party	District	Notes
Mike Levin	Democratic	California's 49th	Also raised Catholic.
Jan Schakowsky	Democratic	Illinois's 9th	
Brad Schneider	Democratic	Illinois's 10th	
Jake Auchincloss	Democratic	Massachusetts's 4th	
Dan Goldman	Democratic	New York's 10th	
Greg Landsman	Democratic	Ohio's 1st	
Becca Balint	Democratic	Vermont's at-large	

== Muslims (5) ==
5 members are Muslims (5 Democrats)

=== Sunni Muslims (3) ===
3 members are Sunni Muslims (3 Democrats)

Portrait	Name	Party	District	Notes
	André Carson	Democratic	Indiana's 7th	Raised Baptist and attended a Catholic school.
	Ilhan Omar	Democratic	Minnesota's 5th	
	Rashida Tlaib	Democratic	Michigan's 12th	

=== Unspecified Muslims (2) ===
2 members are Muslim, but haven't specified their branch (2 Democrats)

Name	Party	District	Notes
Lateefah Simon	Democratic	California's 12th	
Aisha Wahab	Democratic	California's 14th	

== Hindus (4) ==
4 members are Hindus (4 Democrats)

Name	Party	District	Notes
Ro Khanna	Democratic	California's 17th	
Raja Krishnamoorthi	Democratic	Illinois's 8th	
Shri Thanedar	Democratic	Michigan's 13th	Previously identified as a Protestant in survey of the 118th Congress.
Suhas Subramanyam	Democratic	Virginia's 10th	

== Unitarian Universalists (3) ==
3 members are Unitarian Universalists (3 Democrats)

Name	Party	District	Notes
Ami Bera	Democratic	California's 6th	Raised Hindu. Reportedly "samples different churches every Sunday."
Judy Chu	Democratic	California's 28th	In a previous survey, Chu did not answer the religion question.
Deborah Ross	Democratic	North Carolina's 2nd	

== Buddhist (2) ==
2 members are Buddhists (2 Democrats)

Name	Party	District	Notes
Derek Tran	Democratic	California's 45th	
Hank Johnson	Democratic	Georgia's 4th	Soka Gakkai International

== Unknown/refused to state (24) ==
20 Democrats, 4 Republicans

Name	Party	District	Religion	Notes
Adelita Grijalva	Democratic	Arizona's 7th	Unknown/refused to state	
James Gallagher	Republican	California's 1st	Unknown/refused to state	
Adam Gray	Democratic	California's 13th	Unknown/refused to state	
Brittany Pettersen	Democratic	Colorado's 7th	Unknown/refused to state	
Everton Blair	Democratic	Georgia's 13th	Unknown/refused to state	
Clay Fuller	Republican	Georgia's 14th	Unknown/refused to state	
Sean Casten	Democratic	Illinois's 6th	Unknown/refused to state	
Bill Foster	Democratic	Illinois's 11th	Unknown/refused to state	
Nikki Budzinski	Democratic	Illinois's 13th	Unknown/refused to state	
Sharice Davids	Democratic	Kansas's 3rd	Unknown/refused to state	
Jared Golden	Democratic	Maine's 2nd	Unknown/refused to state	Unspecified Christian
Sarah Elfreth	Democratic	Maryland's 3rd	Unknown/refused to state	
Herb Conaway	Democratic	New Jersey's 3rd	Unknown/refused to state	
Melanie Stansbury	Democratic	New Mexico's 1st	Unknown/refused to state	
Josh Riley	Democratic	New York's 19th	Unknown/refused to state	
David Taylor	Republican	Ohio's 2nd	Unknown/refused to state	
Maxine Dexter	Democratic	Oregon's 3rd	Unknown/refused to state	
Chrissy Houlahan	Democratic	Pennsylvania's 6th	Unknown/refused to state	Although she is of Jewish origin on her father's side, she does not identify herself as such.
Seth Magaziner	Democratic	Rhode Island's 2nd	Unknown/refused to state	His father is Jewish, his mother Catholic.
Matt Van Epps	Republican	Tennessee's 7th	Unknown/refused to state	Unspecified Christian
Christian Menefee	Democratic	Texas's 18th	Unknown/refused to state	
James Walkinshaw	Democratic	Virginia's 11th	Unknown/refused to state	
Pramila Jayapal	Democratic	Washington's 7th	Unknown/refused to state	Born in a Hindu family.
Mark Pocan	Democratic	Wisconsin's 2nd	Unknown/refused to state	

== Unaffiliated (4) ==
3 Democrats, 1 Republican

Name	Party	District	Identity	Notes
Yassamin Ansari	Democratic	Arizona's 3rd	Agnostic	Born in a Muslim family.
Abraham Hamadeh	Republican	Arizona's 8th	Nondenominational	His father is Muslim, his mother Druze.
Jared Huffman	Democratic	California's 2nd	Secular humanist/agnostic	Raised in the Reorganized Church of Jesus Christ of Latter Day Saints (RLDS), he lost faith at age 19. Does not describe himself as an atheist, instead saying he is "a humanist, [perhaps an] agnostic."
Emily Randall	Democratic	Washington's 6th	Unaffiliated	

== Current non-voting members ==
The following list reports the religious affiliation of the non-voting members of the United States House of Representatives in the 119th Congress.

Name	Party	District	Religion	Notes
Delegate Amata Coleman Radewagen	Republican	American Samoa at-large	Roman Catholic	
Delegate Eleanor Holmes Norton	Democratic	District of Columbia at-large	Episcopalian	
Delegate James Moylan	Republican	Guam at-large	Roman Catholic	
Delegate Kimberlyn King-Hinds	Republican	Northern Mariana Islands at-large	Roman Catholic	
Resident Commissioner Pablo Hernández Rivera	Democratic	Puerto Rico at-large	Roman Catholic	
Delegate Stacey Plaskett	Democratic	U.S. Virgin Islands at-large	Lutheran	

== Numbers and percentages ==
The most basic breakdown of the above data in this page indicates that 86% of the House identify as Christian, 5% of the House identify as Jewish, 3% of the House identify with other religions, <1% of the House is unaffiliated, and 4% of the House have unknown affiliation.

Religion	Group	No. of reps	% of reps
Christians	Roman-rite Catholics	124 / 435	28.5%
Christians	Unspecified Protestants	84 / 435	19.3%
Christians	Baptists	63 / 435	14.5%
Christians	Methodists	22 / 435	5.1%
Christians	Episcopalians	16 / 435	3.7%
Christians	Presbyterians	15 / 435	3.4%
Christians	Lutherans	14 / 435	3.2%
Christians	Non-denominational Protestants	10 / 435	2.3%
Christians	Other Christians	10 / 435	2.3%
Christians	Orthodox Christians	7 / 435	1.6%
Christians	The Church of Jesus Christ of Latter-day Saints (Mormons)	6 / 435	1.4%
Jews		24 / 435	5.5%
Hindus		4 / 435	0.9%
Muslims		4 / 435	0.9%
Unitarian Universalists		3 / 435	0.7%
Buddhists		2 / 435	0.5%
Unknown/refused to state		24 / 435	5.5%
Unaffiliated		4 / 435	0.9%

== See also ==
- Religion in the United States
- Demographics of the United States
- Chaplain of the United States Senate
- Chaplain of the United States House of Representatives
- Religious affiliation in the United States Senate
- Religious affiliations of presidents of the United States
- Religious affiliations of vice presidents of the United States
