= Religious affiliations of presidents of Lebanon =

The religious affiliations of presidents of Lebanon are a major condition in determining the eligibility candidate. Since the identity of Lebanese population is divided by religion and sects, an unwritten understanding between them resulted in Christians taking the position since its establishment.

== Religious affiliations ==
President	Religion	Sect	Position(s)	Term(s)					
President	Religion	Sect	Position(s)	Term(s)	Charles Debbas	Christian	Greek Orthodox	President of Greater Lebanon	1926–1934
Antoine Privat-Aubouard	Christian		Acting President of Greater Lebanon	1934					
Habib Pacha Saad	Christian	Maronite	President of Greater Lebanon	1934–1936					
Émile Eddé	Christian	Maronite	President of Greater Lebanon	1936–1941					
Pierre-Georges Arlabosse	Christian		Acting President of Greater Lebanon	1941					
Alfred Georges Naccache	Christian	Maronite	President of Greater Lebanon	1941–1943					
Ayoub Tabet	Christian	Protestant	Secretary of State of Greater Lebanon Acting President of Greater Lebanon	1943 1943					
Petro Trad	Christian	Greek Orthodox	President of Greater Lebanon	1943					
Bechara El Khoury	Christian	Maronite	President of Greater Lebanon President of Lebanon	1943 1943–1952					
Fouad Chehab	Christian	Maronite	Prime Minister of Lebanon Acting President of Lebanon	1952 1952					
Camille Chamoun	Christian	Maronite	President of Lebanon	1952–1958					
Fouad Chehab	Christian	Maronite	President of Lebanon	1958–1964					
Charles Helou	Christian	Maronite	President of Lebanon	1964–1970					
Suleiman Franjieh	Christian	Maronite	President of Lebanon	1970–1976					
Élias Sarkis	Christian	Maronite	President of Lebanon	1976–1982					
Bachir Gemayel	Christian	Maronite	President-elect of Lebanon	1982					
Amine Gemayel	Christian	Maronite	President of Lebanon	1982–1988					
Selim Hoss	Muslim	Sunni	Acting Prime Minister of Lebanon Acting President of Lebanon	1987–1990 1988–1989					
Michel Aoun	Christian	Maronite	Prime Minister of Lebanon Acting President of Lebanon	1988–1990 1988–1990					
René Moawad	Christian	Maronite	President of Lebanon	1989					
Selim Hoss	Muslim	Sunni	Prime Minister of Lebanon Acting President of Lebanon	1989					
Elias Hrawi	Christian	Maronite	President of Lebanon	1989–1998					
Émile Lahoud	Christian	Maronite	President of Lebanon	1998–2007					
Fouad Siniora	Muslim	Sunni	Prime Minister of Lebanon Acting President of Lebanon	2005–2009 2007–2008					
Michel Suleiman	Christian	Maronite	President of Lebanon	2008–2014					
Tammam Salam	Muslim	Sunni	Prime Minister of Lebanon Acting President of Lebanon	2014–2016 2014–2016					
Michel Aoun	Christian	Maronite	President of Lebanon	2016–2022					
Nawaf Salam	Muslim	Sunni	Prime Minister of Lebanon	2025-present					
Joseph Aoun	Christian	Maronite	President of Lebanon	2025-present					

== See also ==
- President of Lebanon
  - List of presidents of Lebanon

Other countries

- List of prime ministers of Canada by religious affiliation
- Religious affiliations of chancellors of Germany
- Religious affiliations of prime ministers of the Netherlands
- Religious affiliations of presidents of the United States
