= Religious affiliations of prime ministers of the Netherlands =

The following is a list of prime ministers of the Netherlands by religious affiliation.

== Religious affiliations of prime ministers of the Netherlands ==
Prime minister	Religion	Branch	Denomination	Church	Former affiliations	Irreligion/fraternity
Gerrit Schimmelpenninck	Christian	Protestant	Calvinist	Dutch Reformed Church		
Jacob de Kempenaer	Christian	Protestant	Calvinist	Dutch Reformed Church		
Johan Rudolph Thorbecke	Christian	Protestant	Lutheran	Lutheran Church		
Floris Adriaan van Hall	Christian	Protestant	Calvinist	Dutch Reformed Church		
Justinus van der Brugghen	Christian	Protestant	Calvinist	Walloon Church		
Jan Jacob Rochussen	Christian	Protestant	Calvinist	Dutch Reformed Church		
Jacob van Zuylen van Nijevelt	Christian	Protestant	Calvinist	Dutch Reformed Church		
Schelto van Heemstra	Christian	Protestant	Calvinist	Dutch Reformed Church		
Isaäc Dignus Fransen van de Putte	Christian	Protestant	Calvinist	Dutch Reformed Church		
Julius van Zuylen van Nijevelt	Christian	Protestant	Calvinist	Dutch Reformed Church		Freemason
Pieter Philip van Bosse	Christian	Protestant	Calvinist	Walloon Church	Dutch Reformed Church	
Gerrit de Vries	Christian	Protestant	Anabaptist	Mennonite Church		
Jan Heemskerk	Christian	Protestant	Arminian	Remonstrant Church		
Jan Kappeyne van de Coppello	Christian	Protestant	Calvinist	Dutch Reformed Church		
Theo van Lynden van Sandenburg	Christian	Protestant	Calvinist	Dutch Reformed Church		
Æneas Mackay	Christian	Protestant	Calvinist	Dutch Reformed Church		
Gijsbert van Tienhoven	Christian	Protestant	Calvinist	Dutch Reformed Church		
Joan Röell	Christian	Protestant	Calvinist	Dutch Reformed Church		
Nicolaas Pierson	Christian	Protestant	Calvinist	Dutch Reformed Church		
Abraham Kuyper	Christian	Protestant	Calvinist	Reformed Churches	Dutch Reformed Church	
Theo de Meester					Dutch Reformed Church	Atheist
Theo Heemskerk	Christian	Protestant	Calvinist	Reformed Churches	Remonstrant Church	
Pieter Cort van der Linden	Christian	Protestant	Arminian	Remonstrant Church		
Charles Ruijs de Beerenbrouck	Christian	Catholicism	Catholicism	Catholic Church		
Hendrikus Colijn	Christian	Protestant	Calvinist	Reformed Churches	Christian Reformed Churches	
Dirk Jan de Geer	Christian	Protestant	Calvinist	Dutch Reformed Church		
Pieter Sjoerds Gerbrandy	Christian	Protestant	Calvinist	Reformed Churches		
Willem Schermerhorn	Christian	Protestant	Arminian	Remonstrant Church	Dutch Reformed Church	
Louis Beel	Christian	Catholicism	Catholicism	Catholic Church		
Willem Drees					Dutch Reformed Church	Agnostic, humanist
Jan de Quay	Christian	Catholicism	Catholicism	Catholic Church		
Victor Marijnen	Christian	Catholicism	Catholicism	Catholic Church		
Jo Cals	Christian	Catholicism	Catholicism	Catholic Church		
Jelle Zijlstra	Christian	Protestant	Calvinist	Reformed Churches		
Piet de Jong	Christian	Catholicism	Catholicism	Catholic Church		
Barend Biesheuvel	Christian	Protestant	Calvinist	Reformed Churches		
Joop den Uyl					Reformed Churches	Agnostic
Dries van Agt	Christian	Catholicism	Catholicism	Catholic Church		
Ruud Lubbers	Christian	Catholicism	Catholicism	Catholic Church		
Wim Kok						Agnostic
Jan Peter Balkenende	Christian	Protestant		Protestant Church	Reformed Churches	
Mark Rutte	Christian	Protestant		Protestant Church	Dutch Reformed Church	
Dick Schoof					Roman Catholic	Agnostic
Rob Jetten					Roman Catholic	Agnostic

== See also ==
- Prime Minister of the Netherlands
  - List of prime ministers of the Netherlands
  - Historical rankings of prime ministers of the Netherlands

Other countries

- List of prime ministers of Canada by religious affiliation
- Religious affiliations of chancellors of Germany
- Religious affiliations of presidents of Lebanon
- Religious affiliations of presidents of the United States
