= Religious affiliations of chancellors of Germany =

Most German chancellors have been followers of a Christian church. German society has been affected by a Catholic-Protestant divide since the Protestant Reformation, and the same effect is visible in this list of German chancellors. It is largely dominated by Catholics and Protestants as these remain the main confessions in the country.

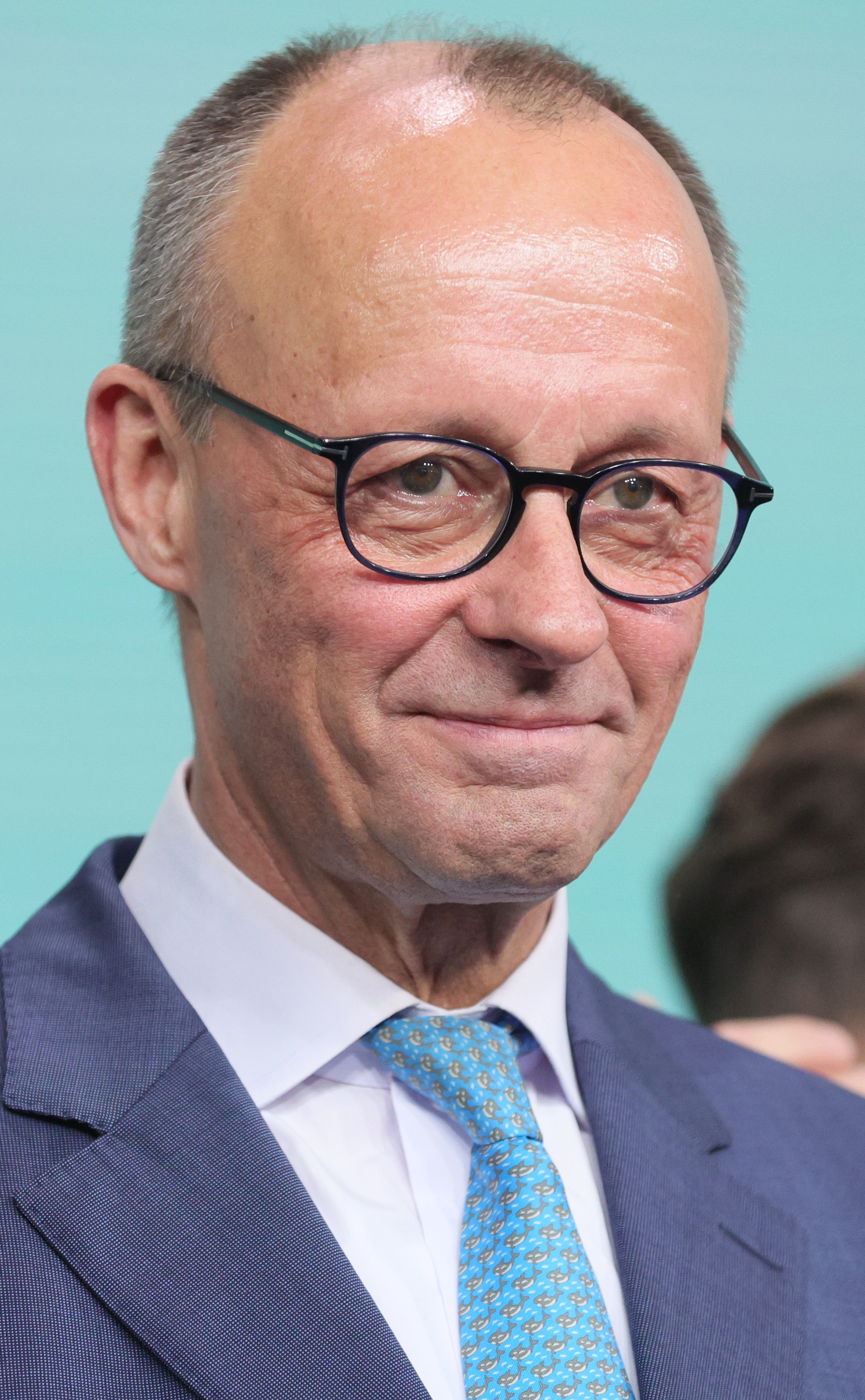
The current German chancellor, Friedrich Merz, is Catholic.

The current German chancellor, Friedrich Merz, is Catholic.

== Details ==
Most of Germany's chancellors have been either Protestants or Catholics. A significant portion of Protestant chancellors belonged to the Prussian Union of Churches, which united the Reformed and Lutheran confessions throughout the Kingdom of Prussia and was in force since 1817. Some Catholic chancellors came from the Catholic Centre Party. The Christian Democratic Union, a party of both Catholics and Protestants, produced both kinds of chancellors. One chancellor, namely Philipp Scheidemann, was Reformed (Calvinist).

Although there were some religious sceptic chancellors, most never officially renounced their faith and were given a Christian funeral. Hermann Müller, a Social Democrat heavily influenced by his father, an advocate of Ludwig Feuerbach's views, is the only one notable for not having been a member of any confession at all.

As some chancellors' views are uncertain or cause confusion among researchers, their official affiliation to a church is mentioned. Due to the German church tax system, legal membership in a church that has the right to collect taxes is officially registered and certain information on this status is available. Actual worldviews are not known for some chancellors; for others, they may differ from the belief system of the church of which they were legal members, as is the case e.g. Adolf Hitler and Joseph Goebbels. A further link to information on their worldviews is given where available, but the absence of such a mention does not mean that other chancellors’ views were necessarily in line with the teachings of their church. For issues about Nazi stance on religion, see Religion in Nazi Germany, Religious aspects of Nazism, and Religious views of Adolf Hitler.

== By term ==
=== North German Confederation (1867–1871) ===
	Name	Term	Legal affiliation
1	Otto von Bismarck	1867–1871	Protestant

=== German Reich (1871–1945) ===
	Name	Term	Legal affiliation during office and notes on belief
German Empire (1871–1918)
1	Otto von Bismarck	1871–1890	Affiliation: Protestant
2	Leo von Caprivi	1890–1894	Affiliation: Protestant
3	Chlodwig zu Hohenlohe-Schillingsfürst	1894–1900	Affiliation: Catholic
4	Bernhard von Bülow	1900–1909	Affiliation: Protestant
5	Theobald von Bethmann Hollweg	1909–1917	Affiliation: Protestant
6	Georg Michaelis	1917	Affiliation: Protestant
7	Georg von Hertling	1917–1918	Affiliation: Catholic
8	Max von Baden	1918	Affiliation: Protestant
Weimar Republic (1918–1933)
9	Friedrich Ebert	1918–1919	Affiliation: None; Baptised Catholic, but later (before 1912) officially left the denomination.
10	Philipp Scheidemann	1919	Affiliation: Protestant
11	Gustav Bauer	1919–1920	Affiliation: None; Unaffiliated to any recognised religion at least from 1912 to 1924. Buried in a Protestant cemetery.
12	Hermann Müller	1920	Affiliation: None
13	Constantin Fehrenbach	1920–1921	Affiliation: Catholic
14	Joseph Wirth	1921–1922	Affiliation: Catholic
15	Wilhelm Cuno	1922–1923	Affiliation: Catholic
16	Gustav Stresemann	1923	Affiliation: Protestant
17	Wilhelm Marx	1923–1925	Affiliation: Catholic
18	Hans Luther	1925–1926	Affiliation: Protestant
19 (17)	Wilhelm Marx	1926–1928	Affiliation: Catholic
20 (12)	Hermann Müller	1928–1930	Affiliation: None
21	Heinrich Brüning	1930–1932	Affiliation: Catholic
22	Franz von Papen	1932	Affiliation: Catholic
23	Kurt von Schleicher	1932–1933	Affiliation: Protestant
Nazi Germany (1933–1945)
24	Adolf Hitler	1933–1945	Affiliation: Catholic; A determined opponent of the Catholic faith, see Nazi attitudes towards Christianity and Religious views of Adolf Hitler
25	Joseph Goebbels	1945	Affiliation: Catholic; A determined opponent of the Catholic faith, see Nazi attitudes towards Christianity. Claims in his diary that Hitler forbade him to disaffiliate for tactical political reasons.
26	Lutz Graf Schwerin von Krosigk	1945	Affiliation: Protestant

=== Federal Republic of Germany (1949–present) ===
	Name	Term	Legal affiliation during office and notes on belief
1	Konrad Adenauer	1949–1963	Affiliation: Catholic
2	Ludwig Erhard	1963–1966	Affiliation: Protestant
3	Kurt Georg Kiesinger	1966–1969	Affiliation: Catholic
4	Willy Brandt	1969–1974	Affiliation: Protestant
5	Helmut Schmidt	1974–1982	Affiliation: Protestant; He is known to have had a distant relationship with religion, having no faith in divine justice.
6	Helmut Kohl	1982–1998	Affiliation: Catholic
7	Gerhard Schröder	1998–2005	Affiliation: Protestant; He did not use the religious form of his oath of office.
8	Angela Merkel	2005–2021	Affiliation: Protestant; She is the daughter of a pastor and has regularly affirmed her Christian beliefs.
9	Olaf Scholz	2021–2025	Affiliation: None; In spite of having disaffiliated, Scholz has claimed that he has completely read the Bible and that Christianity has left a clear mark on who he is. He did not use the religious form of his oath of office.
10	Friedrich Merz	2025–present	Affiliation: Catholic

==== Affiliation totals ====
Affiliation	
Protestant	16
Catholic	14^{a}
None	4

a. Including two determined opponents of the Catholic faith, Hitler and Goebbels (see Nazi attitudes towards Christianity).

== See also ==
- List of prime ministers of Canada by religious affiliation
- Religious affiliations of presidents of Lebanon
- Religious affiliations of prime ministers of the Netherlands
- Religious affiliations of presidents of the United States
