= List of prime ministers of Canada by religious affiliation =

This is a list of prime ministers of Canada by religious affiliation. It notes party affiliation after the name. Of the 24 persons to have held the office, 13 have been Protestants and 11 have been Catholics. However, Catholicism is the denomination that has provided the most prime ministers, as all 11 Catholic prime ministers have been Roman Rite Catholics, while the Protestant ones have belonged to no less than five denominations.

In early Canadian history, religion played an important role in politics. The Conservative Party was composed mainly of Anglicans and conservative French-Canadian Catholics while the Liberal Party was backed by reform-minded French Canadian Catholics and non-Anglican English Canadians due to their support in Quebec and Ontario.

== List of prime ministers by religious affiliation ==
Name	Party	Religion	Branch	Denomination	In office	Notes
Sir John A. Macdonald	Liberal-Conservative	Christian	Protestant	Anglican	July 1, 1867–November 5, 1873, October 17, 1878–June 6, 1891	Raised Presbyterian, converted in 1875.
Alexander Mackenzie	Liberal	Christian	Protestant	Baptist	November 7, 1873–October 8, 1878	Raised Presbyterian, but converted to Baptist at age 19 or 20.
Sir John Abbott	Liberal-Conservative	Christian	Protestant	Anglican	June 16, 1891–November 24, 1892	
Sir John Thompson	Liberal-Conservative	Christian	Catholic	Latin Church	December 5, 1892–December 12, 1894	Born a Methodist but converted to Catholicism when he married.
Sir Mackenzie Bowell	Conservative (historical)	Christian	Protestant	Presbyterian	December 12, 1894–April 27, 1896	Orange Order leader
Sir Charles Tupper	Conservative (historical)	Christian	Protestant	Baptist	May 1, 1896–July 8, 1896	Born a Baptist, married an Anglican and attended that church with his family. On his own sometimes attended Baptist churches.
Sir Wilfrid Laurier	Liberal	Christian	Catholic	Latin Church	July 11, 1896–October 6, 1911	Strongly anti-clerical.
Sir Robert Borden	Conservative (historical)	Christian	Protestant	Anglican	October 10, 1911–July 10, 1920	Raised Presbyterian.
Arthur Meighen	Conservative (historical)	Christian	Protestant	Presbyterian	July 10, 1920–December 29, 1921, June 29, 1926–September 25, 1926	Became a major fundraiser for the Salvation Army.
William Lyon Mackenzie King	Liberal	Christian	Protestant	Presbyterian	December 29, 1921–June 28, 1926, September 25, 1926–August 7, 1930, October 23, 1935–November 15, 1948	In addition to Christianity, King believed in various forms of esotericism and mysticism.
William Lyon Mackenzie King	Liberal	Esoteric	Spiritualism and Occultism		December 29, 1921–June 28, 1926, September 25, 1926–August 7, 1930, October 23, 1935–November 15, 1948	In addition to Christianity, King believed in various forms of esotericism and mysticism.
Richard Bedford Bennett	Conservative (historical)	Christian	Protestant	United Church of Canada	August 7, 1930–October 23, 1935	Was a Methodist before that denomination merged into the United Church of Canada.
Louis St. Laurent	Liberal	Christian	Catholic	Latin Church	November 5, 1948–June 21, 1957	
John Diefenbaker	Progressive Conservative	Christian	Protestant	Baptist	June 21, 1956–April 22, 1963	
Lester B. Pearson	Liberal	Christian	Protestant	United Church of Canada	April 22, 1963–April 20, 1968	Was a Methodist before that denomination merged into the United Church of Canada.
Pierre Trudeau	Liberal	Christian	Catholic	Latin Church	April 20, 1968–June 4, 1979, March 3, 1980–June 30, 1984	Believer in Catholic Personalism. Former board member of the Humanist Fellowship of Montreal.
Joe Clark	Progressive Conservative	Christian	Catholic	Latin Church	June 4, 1979–March 3, 1980	
John Turner	Liberal	Christian	Catholic	Latin Church	June 30, 1984–September 17, 1984	
Brian Mulroney	Progressive Conservative	Christian	Catholic	Latin Church	September 17, 1984–June 25, 1993	
Kim Campbell	Progressive Conservative	Christian	Protestant	Anglican	June 25, 1993–November 4, 1993	Does not attend church and criticizes the treatment of women by organized religion. In 2004 she stated that religion "gets in the way of morality".
Jean Chrétien	Liberal	Christian	Catholic	Latin Church	November 4, 1993–December 12, 2003	Strongly anti-clerical in his youth.
Paul Martin	Liberal	Christian	Catholic	Latin Church	December 12, 2003–February 6, 2006	Came into conflict with the Catholic Church over his support for the Civil Marriage Act, by not allowing Cabinet ministers to have conscience votes.
Stephen Harper	Conservative (modern)	Christian	Protestant	Christian and Missionary Alliance	February 6, 2006–November 4, 2015	Raised in the United Church of Canada.
Justin Trudeau	Liberal	Christian	Catholic	Latin Church	November 4, 2015–March 14, 2025	Baptized and raised as a Catholic, became a lapsed Catholic in his youth until the death of his brother Michel. His mother is Anglican.
Mark Carney	Liberal	Christian	Catholic	Latin Church	March 14, 2025–present	

== See also ==
- Religion in Canada

Other countries

- Religious affiliations of chancellors of Germany
- Religious affiliations of presidents of Lebanon
- Religious affiliations of prime ministers of the Netherlands
- Religious affiliations of presidents of the United States
