= Religious affiliation in the United States Senate =

This list reports the religious affiliation of the members of the United States Senate in the 119th United States Congress. In most cases, in addition to specific sources, the senators' religious affiliations are those mentioned by the Pew Forum on Religion and Public Life at the Pew Research Center, which publishes a report at the beginning of each Congress.

== Christians (86) ==
86 members are Christians (32 Democrats, 53 Republicans, 1 Independent)

=== Protestants (59) ===
59 members are Protestants (19 Democrats, 39 Republicans, 1 Independent)

==== Baptists (11) ====
11 members are Baptists (3 Democrats, 8 Republicans)

Name	Party	State	Notes
Angela Alsobrooks	Democratic	Maryland	Denomination: Converge; member of First Baptist Church of Glenarden.
Cory Booker	Democratic	New Jersey	Denomination: NBC; raised as a Methodist.
John Boozman	Republican	Arkansas	Denomination: SBC.
Ted Cruz	Republican	Texas	Denomination: SBC.
Chuck Grassley	Republican	Iowa	Denomination: BGC; attends a non-denominational church.
Cindy Hyde-Smith	Republican	Mississippi	Denomination: SBC.
Jim Justice	Republican	West Virginia	Denomination: ABC.
James Lankford	Republican	Oklahoma	Denomination: SBC; former student ministries and evangelism specialist for the BGCO.
Mitch McConnell	Republican	Kentucky	Denomination: SBC.
Raphael Warnock	Democratic	Georgia	Former associated pastor of Abyssinian Baptist Church, affiliated to NBC; senior pastor of Ebenezer Baptist Church, affiliated to PNBC and ABC.
Roger Wicker	Republican	Mississippi	Denomination: SBC.

==== Presbyterians (12) ====
12 members are Presbyterians (4 Democrats, 8 Republicans)

Name	Party	State	Notes
Jim Banks	Republican	Indiana	Denomination: EPC.
John Barrasso	Republican	Wyoming	Denomination: PCUSA; former Catholic.
Marsha Blackburn	Republican	Tennessee	Denomination: PCA.
Shelley Moore Capito	Republican	West Virginia	Denomination: PCUSA.
Chris Coons	Democratic	Delaware	Denomination: PCUSA; attends a Catholic church.
Steve Daines	Republican	Montana	Denomination: EPC.
Deb Fischer	Republican	Nebraska	
Josh Hawley	Republican	Missouri	Denomination: EPC; raised as a Methodist.
Andy Kim	Democratic	New Jersey	
Rand Paul	Republican	Kentucky	Denomination: PCUSA; raised as an Episcopalian.
Tina Smith	Democratic	Minnesota	Swore by an old Heilige Bibel, a family Bible.
Mark Warner	Democratic	Virginia	

==== Non-denominational Evangelicals (6) ====
6 members are Non-denominational Protestants (1 Democrat, 5 Republicans)

Name	Party	State	Notes
Lisa Blunt Rochester	Democratic	Delaware	
Ted Budd	Republican	North Carolina	
Bill Cassidy	Republican	Louisiana	
Rick Scott	Republican	Florida	Former Presbyterian.
Tim Scott	Republican	South Carolina	
John Thune	Republican	South Dakota	

==== Lutherans (6) ====
6 members are Lutherans (2 Democrats, 4 Republicans)

Name	Party	State	Notes
Joni Ernst	Republican	Iowa	Denomination: ELCA.
Martin Heinrich	Democratic	New Mexico	Denomination: ELCA.
Ron Johnson	Republican	Wisconsin	Denomination: WELS.
Cynthia Lummis	Republican	Wyoming	Denomination: LCMS.
Jeff Merkley	Democratic	Oregon	Denomination: ELCA.
Tim Sheehy	Republican	Montana	

==== Methodists (5) ====
5 members are Methodists (1 Democrat, 4 Republicans)

Name	Party	State	Notes
Katie Britt	Republican	Alabama	Denomination: UMC.
Tom Cotton	Republican	Arkansas	Denomination: UMC.
John Kennedy	Republican	Louisiana	Denomination: UMC.
Jerry Moran	Republican	Kansas	Attends a Presbyterian church.
Elizabeth Warren	Democratic	Massachusetts	Denomination: UMC; attends various churches.

==== Episcopalians (5) ====
5 members are Episcopalians (3 Democrats, 1 Republican, 1 Independent)

Name	Party	State	Notes
Bill Hagerty	Republican	Tennessee	
Angus King	Independent (caucusing with Democrats)	Maine	
Gary Peters	Democratic	Michigan	
Chris Van Hollen	Democratic	Maryland	
Sheldon Whitehouse	Democratic	Rhode Island	

==== Restorationists (3) ====
3 members are Restorationists (3 Republicans)

Name	Party	State	Notes
John Cornyn	Republican	Texas	Denomination: Churches of Christ.
Roger Marshall	Republican	Kansas	Denomination: Christian Church (Disciples of Christ).
Tommy Tuberville	Republican	Alabama	Denomination: Churches of Christ.

==== Congregationalists (2) ====
2 members are Congregationalists (2 Democrats)

Name	Party	State	Notes
Maggie Hassan	Democratic	New Hampshire	Denomination: UCC.
Amy Klobuchar	Democratic	Minnesota	Denomination: UCC.

==== Pentecostals (1) ====
1 members is a Pentecostal (1 Republican)

Name	Party	State	Notes
Kevin Cramer	Republican	North Dakota	Denomination: ICFG; former Lutheran.

==== Quakers (1) ====
1 member is a Quaker (1 Democrat)

Name	Party	State	Notes
John Hickenlooper	Democratic	Colorado	"Raised on the periphery of the Episcopal Church", but misidentified as an Episcopalian in the Pew Report.

==== Unspecified Protestants (7) ====
7 members are Protestants, but haven't specified their denomination (5 Republicans, 2 Democrats)

Name	Party	State	Notes
Alan Armstrong	Republican	Oklahoma	
Darline Graham	Republican	South Carolina	
Dave McCormick	Republican	Pennsylvania	
Ashley Moody	Republican	Florida	
Chris Murphy	Democratic	Connecticut	Raised as a Congregationalist.
Jeanne Shaheen	Democratic	New Hampshire	
Todd Young	Republican	Indiana	

=== Catholics (24) ===
24 members are Catholics (13 Democrats, 11 Republicans)

Name	Party	State	Notes
Maria Cantwell	Democratic	Washington	
Susan Collins	Republican	Maine	
Catherine Cortez Masto	Democratic	Nevada	
Dick Durbin	Democratic	Illinois	
Ruben Gallego	Democratic	Arizona	
Kirsten Gillibrand	Democratic	New York	
John Hoeven	Republican	North Dakota	
Jon Husted	Republican	Ohio	
Tim Kaine	Democratic	Virginia	
Mark Kelly	Democratic	Arizona	His wife, former Rep. Gabby Giffords, is Jewish.
Ben Ray Luján	Democratic	New Mexico	
Ed Markey	Democratic	Massachusetts	
Bernie Moreno	Republican	Ohio	
Lisa Murkowski	Republican	Alaska	
Patty Murray	Democratic	Washington	
Alex Padilla	Democratic	California	
Jack Reed	Democratic	Rhode Island	
Pete Ricketts	Republican	Nebraska	
Jim Risch	Republican	Idaho	
Mike Rounds	Republican	South Dakota	
Eric Schmitt	Republican	Missouri	
Dan Sullivan	Republican	Alaska	
Thom Tillis	Republican	North Carolina	
Peter Welch	Democratic	Vermont	

=== Latter-day Saints (3) ===
3 members are a part of The Church of Jesus Christ of Latter-day Saints (3 Republicans)

Name	Party	State	Notes
Mike Crapo	Republican	Idaho	
John Curtis	Republican	Utah	
Mike Lee	Republican	Utah	

== Jews (10) ==
10 members are Jewish (9 Democrats, 1 Independent)

=== Reform Judaism (7) ===
7 members are Reform Jews (7 Democrats)

Name	Party	State	Notes
Richard Blumenthal	Democratic	Connecticut	
Jon Ossoff	Democratic	Georgia	
Elissa Slotkin	Democratic	Michigan	
Jacky Rosen	Democratic	Nevada	
Brian Schatz	Democratic	Hawaii	
Chuck Schumer	Democratic	New York	
Ron Wyden	Democratic	Oregon	

=== Unspecified Judaism (2) ===
2 members are Jewish, but haven't specified their religious movement (2 Democrats)

Name	Party	State	Notes
Adam Schiff	Democratic	California	Raised Reform
Michael Bennet	Democratic	Colorado	Jewish

=== Non-practicing (1) ===
1 member is non-practicing (1 Independent)

Name	Party	State	Notes
Bernie Sanders	Independent (caucusing with Democrats)	Vermont	Non-practicing

== Buddhists (1) ==
Name	Party	State	Religion	Notes
Mazie Hirono	Democratic	Hawaii	Buddhist	School: Jōdo Shinshū; non-practicing.

== Unknown or refused to specify (3) ==
Name	Party	State	Religion	Notes
Tammy Baldwin	Democratic	Wisconsin	Unknown or refused to specify	Baptized as an Episcopalian.
Tammy Duckworth	Democratic	Illinois	Unknown or refused to specify	Sometimes acknowledged as Deist. Her father was a Baptist.
John Fetterman	Democratic	Pennsylvania	Unknown or refused to specify	

== Comparison with general population ==
In conjunction with figures derived from the Pew Research Center's 2021 "survey of the religious composition of the United States", the most basic breakdown of the above data indicates that 84% of the Senate identify as Christian (compared with 62% of the population), 9% identify as Jewish (compared with 2% of the population), 4% have unknown religious affiliation or refused to specify it (compared with 2% of the population), 1% identifies with other religions (compared with 5% of the population), while 0% identifies as unaffiliated (compared with 28% of the population).

According to figures derived from Gallup, Inc., in 2023 the most basic breakdown of the above data indicates that 86% of the Senate identify as Christian (compared with 67% of the population), 9% identify as Jewish (compared with 2% of the population), 4% have unknown religious affiliation or refused to specify it (compared with 3% of the population), 1% identifies with other religions (compared with 6% of the population), while 0% identifies as unaffiliated (compared with 22% of the population).

The unaffiliated are extremely under-represented, while Jews, Presbyterians, Lutherans and Episcopalians are particularly over-represented.

The following table compares reported religious affiliations of senators to religious statistics of the demographics of the United States:

Religion	Group	No. of senators	% of senators	% of population	Relative representation
Christians	Catholics	24 / 100	24%	20%	121%
Christians	Presbyterians	12 / 100	12%	2%	605%
Christians	Baptists	11 / 100	11%	11%	100.91%
Christians	Non-denominational Evangelicals	6 / 100	6%	8%	76.25%
Christians	Lutherans	6 / 100	6%	3%	203.33%
Christians	Methodists	5 / 100	5%	3%	170%
Christians	Episcopalians	5 / 100	5%	1%	510%
Christians	Restorationists	3 / 100	3%	1%	300%
Christians	Pentecostals	1 / 100	1%	4%	25%
Christians	Other Protestants	11 / 100	11%	8%	138.75%
Christians	Latter-day Saints	3 / 100	3%	1%	300%
Jews		10 / 100	10%	2%	505%
Other religions		1 / 100	1%	6%	16.67%
Unknown or refused to specify		3 / 100	3%	2%	150%
Unaffiliated		0 / 100	0%	28%	0%

== See also ==
- Demographics of the United States
- Religion in the United States
- Religious affiliation in the United States House of Representatives
- Religious affiliations of presidents of the United States
- Religious affiliations of vice presidents of the United States
