= Religious affiliations of presidents of the United States =

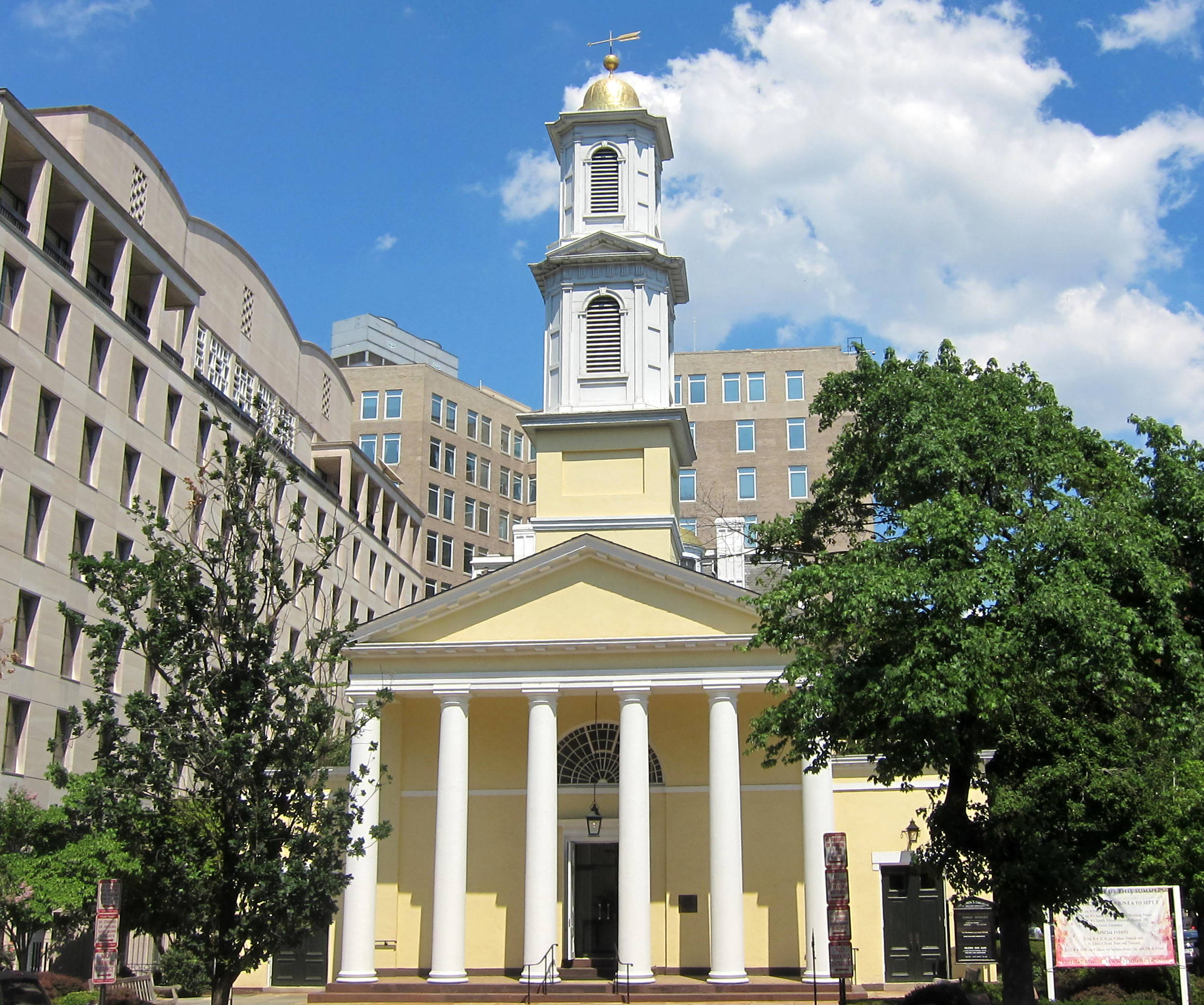
The majority of American presidents have belonged to Protestant faiths. St. John's Church, an Episcopal church in Washington, D.C., has been visited by every sitting president since James Madison.

Religious affiliations can affect the electability of the presidents of the United States and shape their stances on policy matters and their visions of society and also how they want to lead it. While no president so far has ever openly identified as an atheist, Thomas Jefferson, Abraham Lincoln, and William Howard Taft were speculated to be atheists by their opponents during political campaigns; in addition, a survey during the first presidency of Donald Trump showed that 63% of Americans did not believe he was religious, despite his professed Christian affiliation. Conspiracy theorists also falsely circulated rumors that Barack Obama was a Muslim during his 2004 Senate campaign and later time as president. Conversely, other presidents, such as Jimmy Carter, used their faith as a defining aspect of their campaigns and tenure in office.

Essentially all of the presidents can be characterized as Christians, at least by upbringing, though some were unaffiliated with any specific religious body. Mainline Protestants predominate, with Episcopalians and Presbyterians being the most prevalent. John F. Kennedy and Joe Biden are so far the only Catholic presidents.

== Formal affiliation ==
The pattern of religious adherence has changed dramatically over the course of United States history, so that the pattern of presidential affiliations is quite unrepresentative of modern membership numbers. For example, Episcopalians are extraordinarily well represented among the presidents compared to a current membership of about 1% of the population; this is partly because the Church of England, from which the Episcopal Church is derived, was the established church in some of the British Colonies (such as New York and Virginia) before the American Revolution. The Episcopal Church has been much larger previously, with its decline in membership occurring only in more recent decades. The first seven presidents listed as Episcopalians were all from Virginia. Unitarians are also overrepresented, reflecting the importance of those colonial churches. Conversely, Baptists are underrepresented, a reflection of their quite recent expansion in numbers; the list includes only two Catholic presidents, although they are currently the largest single denomination. There have been no Adventist, Anabaptist, Eastern Orthodox, Assyrian Church of the East, Oriental Orthodox, Lutheran, Latter Day Saint, or Pentecostal presidents.

While many presidents did not formally join a church until quite late in life, there is a genre of tales of deathbed conversions. Biographers usually doubt these, though the baptism of James K. Polk is well documented.

== Personal beliefs ==
On the other hand, there are several presidents who considered themselves aligned with a particular church, but who withheld from formal affiliation for a time. James Buchanan, for instance, held himself allied with the Presbyterian church, but refrained from joining it until he left office.

=== Deism and the Founding Fathers ===
Deism was a religious philosophy in common currency in colonial times, and some Founding Fathers (most notably Thomas Paine, who was an explicit proponent of it, and Benjamin Franklin, who spoke of it in his Autobiography) are identified more or less with this system. Thomas Jefferson became a deist in later life, and George Washington, John Adams, Alexander Hamilton, James Madison, James Monroe, and John Tyler are often identified as having some degree of deistic beliefs.

=== Unitarianism and nontrinitarianism ===
Four presidents were affiliated with Unitarian churches and a fifth (Thomas Jefferson) was an exponent of ideas now commonly associated with Unitarianism. Unitarianism, the belief that God has a unitary nature, developed in opposition to Trinitarianism, the belief that God is three persons in one (the Father, the Son and the Holy Spirit). In a letter to Benjamin Waterhouse in 1822, Jefferson said, "I trust that there is not a young man now living in the US. who will not die an Unitarian." William Howard Taft, a Unitarian, said in a letter to a friend, "I am interested in the spread of Christian civilization, but to go into a dogmatic discussion of creed I will not do whether I am defeated or not. ... If the American electorate is so narrow as not to elect a Unitarian, well and good. I can stand it."

While Abraham Lincoln never officially joined a church, there has been some research indicating that he may have had Quaker leanings. During his time in office, he had numerous meetings with Quakers and had investigated a supposed Quaker ancestry.

The only other president with any association with a definitely nontrinitarian body is Dwight D. Eisenhower, whose parents moved from the River Brethren to the antecedents of the Jehovah's Witnesses. Eisenhower himself was baptized in the Presbyterian church shortly after assuming the presidency, the only president thus far to undergo such a rite while in office; and his attendance at West Point was in sharp opposition to the tenets of the groups to which his parents belonged.

=== Nonreligious presidents ===
There are some presidents for whom there is little evidence as to the importance of religion in their lives. For example, almost no evidence exists for Monroe's personal religious beliefs, though this may be the result of the destruction of most of his personal correspondence, in which religious sentiments may have been recorded. As with claims of deism, these identifications are not without controversy. No president has declared himself to be atheist.

== Civic religion ==
St. John's Episcopal Church (built 1815–1816) just across Lafayette Square and north of the White House, is the church nearest to the White House, and its services have been attended at least once by nearly every president since James Madison (1809–1817). Another Episcopal church, Washington National Cathedral, chartered by Congress in 1893, has hosted many funeral and memorial services of presidents and other dignitaries, as well as the site of interfaith presidential prayer services after their inaugurations, and the burial place of Woodrow Wilson.

Throughout history governmental proclamations often include religious language. In at least two cases, presidents saw fit to issue denials that they were atheists. At the same time, this was tempered, especially in early years, by a strong commitment to disestablishment. Several presidents especially stand out as exponents of this. Consideration of this has become increasingly contentious as topics such as civil rights and human sexuality have increasingly put churches at odds with each other and with the government.

== List of presidents by religious affiliation ==
No.	Name	Religion	Branch	Further Branch	Denomination	Years in office
1	George Washington	Christian	Protestant	Anglican	Episcopalian	1789–1797
2	John Adams	Christian	Nontrinitarian	Unitarian		1797–1801
3	Thomas Jefferson	Christian	Nontrinitarian	Unitarian	Christian deist, originally Anglican (Note: He was a member of the Church of England, not an Episcopalian. His deism has been classified as denominational, based on historical quotations such as "I am of a sect by myself, as far as I know" and "I am a Christian, in the only sense in which he wished any one to be". For more information, see Religious views of Thomas Jefferson.)	1801–1809
4	James Madison	Christian	Protestant	Anglican	Episcopalian	1809–1817
5	James Monroe	Christian	Protestant	Anglican	Episcopalian	1817–1825
6	John Quincy Adams	Christian	Nontrinitarian	Unitarian	Unitarian	1825–1829
7	Andrew Jackson	Christian	Protestant	Reformed	Presbyterian	1829–1837
8	Martin Van Buren	Christian	Protestant	Reformed	Dutch Reformed	1837–1841
9	William Henry Harrison	Christian	Protestant	Anglican	Episcopalian	1841–1841
10	John Tyler	Christian	Protestant	Anglican	Episcopalian	1841–1845
11	James K. Polk	Christian	Protestant	Methodist	Methodist Episcopal	1845–1849
12	Zachary Taylor	Christian	Protestant	Anglican	Episcopalian	1849–1850
13	Millard Fillmore	Christian	Nontrinitarian	Unitarian	Unitarian	1850–1853
14	Franklin Pierce	Christian	Protestant	Reformed	Congregationalist- later converted to Episcopalian	1853–1857
15	James Buchanan	Christian	Protestant	Reformed	Presbyterian	1857–1861
16	Abraham Lincoln	Christian	Disputed			1861–1865
17	Andrew Johnson	Christian	Protestant	Nondenominational		1865–1869
18	Ulysses S. Grant	Christian	Protestant	Nondenominational		1869–1877
19	Rutherford B. Hayes	Christian	Protestant	Nondenominational		1877–1881
20	James A. Garfield	Christian	Protestant	Restoration Movement	Disciples of Christ	1881–1881
21	Chester A. Arthur	Christian	Protestant	Anglican	Episcopalian	1881–1885
22/24	Grover Cleveland	Christian	Protestant	Reformed	Presbyterian	1885–1889; 1893–1897
23	Benjamin Harrison	Christian	Protestant	Reformed	Presbyterian	1889–1893
25	William McKinley	Christian	Protestant	Methodist	Methodist Episcopal	1897–1901
26	Theodore Roosevelt	Christian	Protestant	Reformed	Dutch Reformed	1901–1909
27	William Howard Taft	Christian	Nontrinitarian	Unitarian	Unitarian	1909–1913
28	Woodrow Wilson	Christian	Protestant	Reformed	Southern Presbyterian	1913–1921
29	Warren G. Harding	Christian	Protestant	Baptist	Northern Baptist	1921–1923
30	Calvin Coolidge	Christian	Protestant	Reformed	Congregationalist	1923–1929
31	Herbert Hoover	Christian	Protestant	Quaker		1929–1933
32	Franklin D. Roosevelt	Christian	Protestant	Anglican	Episcopalian	1933–1945
33	Harry S. Truman	Christian	Protestant	Baptist		1945–1953
34	Dwight D. Eisenhower	Christian	Protestant	Reformed	United Presbyterian ( Pealeist (Note: Pealeism is a non-denominational Christian movement centred on the ministry of Norman Vincent Peale, with the majority of its followers having historically been mainline Protestant; see beliefs.))	1953–1961
35	John F. Kennedy	Christian	Catholic	Latin Church		1961–1963
36	Lyndon B. Johnson	Christian	Protestant	Restoration Movement	Disciples of Christ	1963–1969
37	Richard Nixon	Christian	Protestant	Quaker	Pealeist	1969–1974
38	Gerald R. Ford	Christian	Protestant	Anglican	Episcopalian	1974–1977
39	Jimmy Carter	Christian	Protestant	Baptist	Southern Baptist	1977–1981
40	Ronald Reagan	Christian	Protestant	Reformed	Presbyterian	1981–1989
41	George H. W. Bush	Christian	Protestant	Anglican	Episcopalian	1989–1993
42	Bill Clinton	Christian	Protestant	Baptist	Southern Baptist	1993–2001
43	George W. Bush	Christian	Protestant	Methodist	United Methodist	2001–2009
44	Barack Obama	Christian	Protestant	Nondenominational		2009–2017
45/47	Donald Trump	Christian	Protestant	Nondenominational	Pealeist	2017–2021; 2025–present
46	Joe Biden	Christian	Catholic	Latin Church		2021–2025

== List of presidents with details on their religious affiliation ==
For each president, the formal affiliation at the time of his presidency is listed first, with other affiliations listed after. Further explanation follows if needed, as well as notable detail.

1. George Washington – Episcopalian and Deist
2. John Adams – Unitarian
  - The Adamses were originally members of the state-supported Congregational churches in New England. By 1800, most Congregationalist churches in Boston had Unitarian preachers teaching the strict unity of God, the subordinate nature of Christ, and salvation by character. Adams himself preferred Unitarian preachers, but he was opposed to Joseph Priestley's sympathies with the French Revolution, and would attend other churches if the only nearby Congregational/Unitarian one was composed of followers of Priestley.
  - Adams described himself as a "church going animal" in a letter to Benjamin Rush.
3. Thomas Jefferson – None specified, possibly Deist
  - Jefferson was raised Anglican and served as a vestryman prior to the American Revolution, but as an adult he did not hold to the tenets of this church. While not holding to the tenets of the church, "he never withdrew from the Episcopal Church [although] his views were essentially what are called Unitarian today." Jefferson spoke favorably of Unitarianism, saying he believed it would "be the religion of the majority from north to south" and a "remedy" for fanaticism.
  - Modern Unitarian Universalists consider Jefferson's views to be very close to theirs. The Famous UUs website says:
  Like many others of his time (he died just one year after the founding of institutional Unitarianism in America), Jefferson was a Unitarian in theology, though not in church membership. He never joined a Unitarian congregation: there were none near his home in Virginia during his lifetime. He regularly attended Joseph Priestley's Pennsylvania church when he was nearby, and said that Priestley's theology was his own, and there is no doubt Priestley should be identified as Unitarian. Jefferson remained a member of the Episcopal congregation near his home, but removed himself from those available to become godparents, because he was not sufficiently in agreement with the Trinitarian theology. His work, the Jefferson Bible, was Unitarian in theology ...
  - In a letter to Benjamin Rush prefacing his "Syllabus of an Estimate of the Merit of the Doctrines of Jesus", Jefferson wrote:
  In some of the delightful conversations with you, in the evenings of 1798–99, and which served as an anodyne to the afflictions of the crisis through which our country was then laboring, the Christian religion was sometimes our topic; and I then promised you, that one day or other, I would give you my views of it. They are the result of a life of inquiry & reflection, and very different from that anti-Christian system imputed to me by those who know nothing of my opinions. To the corruptions of Christianity I am indeed opposed; but not to the genuine precepts of Jesus himself. I am a Christian, in the only sense he wished any one to be; sincerely attached to his doctrines, in preference to all others; ascribing to himself every human excellence; & believing he never claimed any other.
  - In a letter to John Adams dated August 22, 1813, Jefferson named Joseph Priestley and Conyers Middleton as the inspirations for his religious beliefs, writing that:
  You are right in supposing, in one of yours, that I had not read much of Priestley's Predestination, his No-soul system, or his controversy with Horsley. but I have read his Corruptions of Christianity, & Early opinions of Jesus, over and over again; and I rest on them, and on Middleton's writings, especially his letters from Rome, and to Waterland, as the basis of my own faith. these writings have never been answered, nor can be answered, by quoting historical proofs, as they have done. for these facts therefore I cling to their learning, so much superior to my own.
4. James Madison – Episcopalian and Deist
  - Although Madison tried to keep a low profile in regards to religion, he seemed to hold religious opinions, like many of his contemporaries, that were closer to deism or Unitarianism in theology than conventional Christianity. He was raised in the Church of England and attended Episcopal services, despite his personal disputes with the theology.
5. James Monroe – Episcopalian
  - Monroe was raised in a family that belonged to the Church of England when it was the state church in Virginia, and as an adult attended Episcopal churches.
  - "When it comes to Monroe's ... thoughts on religion", Bliss Isely comments in his The Presidents: Men of Faith, "less is known than that of any other President." Monroe burned much of his correspondence with his wife, and no letters survive in which he discusses his religious beliefs; nor did his friends, family or associates write about his beliefs. Letters that do survive, such as ones written on the occasion of the death of his son, contain no discussion of religion.
  - Some authors conclude that Monroe's writings show evidence of "deistic tendencies".
6. John Quincy Adams – Unitarian
  - Adams's religious views shifted over the course of his life. In college and early adulthood he preferred trinitarian theology, and from 1818 to 1848 he served as vice president of the American Bible Society. However, as he grew older his views became more typically Unitarian, though he rejected some of the views of Joseph Priestley and the Transcendentalists.
  - He was a founding member of the First Unitarian Church of Washington (D.C.). However he regularly attended Presbyterian and Episcopal services as well.
  - Towards the end of his life, he wrote, "I reverence God as my creator. As creator of the world. I reverence him with holy fear. I venerate Jesus Christ as my redeemer; and, as far as I can understand, the redeemer of the world. But this belief is dark and dubious."
7. Andrew Jackson – Presbyterian
  - He became a member of the Presbyterian Church about a year after leaving the presidency.
8. Martin Van Buren – Dutch Reformed
  - Van Buren is reported to have attended the Dutch Reformed church in his home town of Kinderhook, New York, and while in Washington, services at St. John's Lafayette Square.
  - His funeral was held at the Reformed Dutch Church in Kinderhook with burial in a family plot at the nearby church cemetery.
9. William Henry Harrison – Episcopalian
  - Harrison was a vestryman of Christ Episcopal Church in Cincinnati, Ohio after resigning his military commission in 1814.
10. John Tyler – Episcopalian
  - Although affiliated with the Episcopal church, he did not take "a denominational approach to God." Tyler was a strong supporter of religious tolerance and separation of church and state.
11. James K. Polk – Methodist
  - Polk came from a Presbyterian upbringing but was not baptized as a child, due to a dispute with the local Presbyterian minister in rural North Carolina. Polk's father and grandfather were Deists, and the minister refused to baptize James unless his father affirmed Christianity, which he would not do. Polk had a conversion experience at a Methodist camp meeting when he was thirty-eight, and thereafter considered himself Methodist. Nevertheless, he continued to attend Presbyterian services with his wife, though he went to the local Methodist chapel when she was ill or out of town. On his deathbed, he summoned the Rev. John B. McFerrin, who had converted him years before, to baptize him.
12. Zachary Taylor – Episcopalian
  - Although raised an Episcopalian and married to a devout Episcopalian, he never became a full communicant member in the church.
13. Millard Fillmore – Unitarian
14. Franklin Pierce – Congregationalist during his presidency, converted to Episcopalianism later in life.
15. James Buchanan – Presbyterian
  - Buchanan, raised a Presbyterian, attended and supported various churches throughout his life. He joined the Presbyterian Church after leaving the presidency.
16. Abraham Lincoln – Christianity, no branch specified.
  - Life before the presidency
    - Some believe that for much of his life, Lincoln was a Deist.
    - Rev. Dr. Phineas D. Gurley, pastor of the New York Avenue Presbyterian church in Washington D.C., which Lincoln attended with his wife when he attended any church, never claimed a conversion. According to D. James Kennedy in his booklet, "What They Believed: The Faith of Washington, Jefferson, and Lincoln", "Dr. Gurley said that Lincoln had wanted to make a public profession of his faith on Easter Sunday morning. But then came Ford's Theater." (p. 59, Published by Coral Ridge Ministries, 2003) Though this is possible, we have no way of verifying the truth of the report. The chief evidence against it is that Dr. Gurley, so far as we know, never mentioned it publicly. The determination to join, if accurate, would have been extremely newsworthy. It would have been reasonable for Dr. Gurley to have mentioned it at the funeral in the White House, in which he delivered the sermon which has been preserved. The only evidence we have is an affidavit signed more than sixty years later by Mrs. Sidney I. Lauck, then a very old woman. In her affidavit signed under oath in Essex County, New Jersey, February 15, 1928, she said, "After Mr. Lincoln's death, Dr. Gurley told me that Mr. Lincoln had made all the necessary arrangements with him and the Session of the New York Avenue Presbyterian Church to be received into the membership of the said church, by confession of his faith in Christ, on the Easter Sunday following the Friday night when Mr. Lincoln was assassinated." Mrs. Lauck was, she said, about thirty years of age at the time of the assassination.
17. Andrew Johnson – No formal affiliation
  - He accompanied his wife Eliza McCardle Johnson to Methodist services sometimes, belonged to no church himself, and sometimes attended Catholic masses—remarking favorably that there was no reserved seating.
18. Ulysses S. Grant – Methodist
  - Grant was never baptized into any church, though he accompanied his wife Julia Grant to Methodist services. Many sources list his religious affiliation as Methodist based on a Methodist minister's account of a deathbed conversion. He did leave a note for his wife in which he hoped to meet her again in a better world.
  - In his 1875 State of the Union address, during conflicts over Catholic parochial schooling, Grant called for a constitutional amendment that would require all states to establish free public schools while "forbidding the teaching in said schools of religious, atheistic, or pagan tenets; and prohibiting the granting of any school funds or school taxes ... for the benefit ... of any religious sect or denomination." The proposed Blaine Amendment to the Constitution followed.
19. Rutherford B. Hayes – Unspecified Protestant
  - Hayes came from a Presbyterian family, but attended Methodist schools as a youth.
  - Many sources list him as Methodist; in general, however, it is agreed that he held himself to be a Christian, but of no specific church.
  - In his diary entry for May 17, 1890, he states: "Writing a few words for Mohonk Negro Conference, I find myself using the word Christian. I am not a subscriber to any creed. I belong to no church. But in a sense, satisfactory to myself and believed by me to be important, I try to be a Christian, or rather I want to be a Christian and to help do Christian work."
  - Hayes' wife, Lucy, was a Methodist, a temperance advocate, and deeply opposed to slavery; he generally attended church with her.
20. James Garfield – Disciples of Christ
  - Only preacher to be elected President.
  - He was baptized at age eighteen by a Disciples preacher.
  - Studied at the Western Reserve Eclectic Institute, a school founded by the Disciples of Christ in Hiram, Ohio. He later taught at the Institute and soon became its president. During his time teaching at the Institute, he preached in the area at Disciples churches
  - Attended yearly meetings of the American Christian Missionary Society, from which the current Christian Church (Disciples of Christ) denomination descends. After the outbreak of the Civil War, Garfield gave a passionate speech in favor of a resolution declaring loyalty to the Union, which the ACMS adopted.
  - Recruited hundreds of Disciples into the regiment he commanded during the Civil War.
  - Disciples helped get him elected to Congress and the Presidency. While in Washington, DC, he attended Vermont Avenue Christian Church, which is now National City Christian Church.
  - Helped found the Christian Standard, a significant Disciples journal.
  - Isaac Errett eulogized Garfield at his funeral in Cleveland, Ohio.
21. Chester A. Arthur – Episcopalian
  - His father was a Baptist preacher.
  - Upon his wife's death in 1880, he commissioned a memorial window for the south transept of St. John's, Lafayette Square, visible from the White House and lighted from within at his behest.
22. Grover Cleveland – Presbyterian
23. Benjamin Harrison – Presbyterian
  - Harrison became a church elder, and taught Sunday school.
24. Grover Cleveland – Presbyterian
25. William McKinley – Methodist
  - Early in life, he planned to become a Methodist minister.
  - James Rusling, a McKinley supporter, related a story that McKinley had addressed a church delegation and had stated that one of the objectives of the Spanish–American War was "to educate the Filipinos, and uplift and civilize and Christianize them". Recent historians have judged this account unreliable, especially in light of implausible statements Rusling made about Lincoln's religion.
  - McKinley is the only president to include exclusively Christian language in his Thanksgiving Day proclamation.
26. Theodore Roosevelt – Dutch Reformed
  - Roosevelt always stated that he was Dutch Reformed; however, he attended Episcopal churches where there was no Reformed church nearby. (His second wife Edith was Episcopalian from birth.) As there was no Dutch Reformed church in Oyster Bay, New York, he attended Christ Church Oyster Bay when in residence there, and it was in that church that his funeral was held.
  - His mother was Presbyterian and as a child he attended Presbyterian churches with her.
27. William Howard Taft – Unitarian
  - Before becoming president, Taft was offered the presidency of Yale University, at that time affiliated with the Congregationalist Church; Taft turned the post down, saying, "I do not believe in the divinity of Christ."
  - Taft's beliefs were the subject of some controversy, and in 1908 he found it necessary to refute a rumor that he was an atheist.
  - During his presidency he attended All Souls Church
28. Woodrow Wilson – Presbyterian
  - Wilson's father was a Presbyterian minister and professor of theology.
  - Prior to being governor of New Jersey and president of the United States, Wilson served as president of Princeton University, which was at the time affiliated with the Presbyterian Church.
29. Warren G. Harding – Northern Baptist
30. Calvin Coolidge – Congregationalist
  - Coolidge attended Edwards Congregational Church in Northampton, Massachusetts, which was affiliated with the National Council of Congregational Churches.
31. Herbert Hoover – Quaker
  - As Quakers customarily do not swear oaths, it was expected that Hoover would affirm the oath of office, and most sources state that he did so. However, a Washington Post article dated February 27, 1929, stated that he planned to swear, rather than affirm, the oath.
32. Franklin D. Roosevelt – Episcopalian
33. Harry S. Truman – Baptist
  - Truman kept his religious beliefs private and alienated some Baptist leaders by doing so.
34. Dwight D. Eisenhower – Presbyterian
  - Eisenhower's religious upbringing is the subject of some controversy, due to the conversion of his parents to the Bible Student movement, the forerunner of the Jehovah's Witnesses, in the late 1890s. Originally, the family belonged to the River Brethren, a Mennonite sect. According to the Eisenhower Presidential Library, there is no evidence that Eisenhower participated in either the Bible Student group or the Jehovah's Witnesses, and there are records that show he attended Sunday school at a River Brethren church.
  - Until he became president, Eisenhower had no formal church affiliation, a circumstance he attributed to the frequent moves demanded of an Army officer. He was baptized, confirmed, and became a communicant in the Presbyterian church in a single ceremony February 1, 1953, just 12 days after his first inauguration, the only president to undergo any of these rites while in office.
  - Eisenhower was instrumental in the addition of the words "under God" to the Pledge of Allegiance in 1954 (an act highly promoted by the Knights of Columbus), and the 1956 adoption of "In God We Trust" as the motto of the US, and its 1957 introduction on paper currency. He composed a prayer for his first inauguration, began his Cabinet meetings with silent prayer, and met frequently with a wide range of religious leaders while in office.
  - His presidential library includes an inter-denominational chapel in which he, his wife Mamie, and his firstborn son (who died in childhood) are buried.
35. John F. Kennedy – Roman Catholic
  - Kennedy was the first Catholic president.
36. Lyndon B. Johnson – Disciples of Christ
  - Attended National City Christian Church while in Washington, DC.
37. Richard M. Nixon – Quaker
  - Contrary to Quaker custom, Nixon swore the oath of office at both of his inaugurations. He also engaged in military service, contrary to the Quaker doctrine of pacifism.
38. Gerald R. Ford – Episcopalian
39. Jimmy Carter – Baptist
  - In 2000, Carter publicly disassociated himself from the Southern Baptist Convention, which he had previously been associated with for 65 years, after the denomination voted at its national convention that women should not serve as pastors. Carter continued to teach Sunday school at Maranatha Baptist Church in his hometown of Plains, Georgia, which he had done since the 1980s. In 2007, Carter founded the New Baptist Covenant organization for social justice.
40. Ronald Reagan – Presbyterian
  - Reagan's father was Catholic, but Reagan was raised in his mother's Disciples of Christ denomination and was baptized there on September 21, 1922. Nancy and Ronald Reagan were married in the Disciples of Christ "Little Brown Church" in Studio City, California on March 4, 1952. Beginning in 1963 Reagan generally attended Presbyterian church services at Bel Air Presbyterian Church, Bel-Air, California. During his presidency he rarely attended church services, due to the inconvenience to others in the congregation. He became an official member of Bel Air Presbyterian after leaving the presidency. Reagan stated that he considered himself a "born-again Christian".
41. George H. W. Bush – Episcopalian
  - Bush was born to an Episcopalian family and raised in the denomination; though he briefly attended Presbyterian services after moving to Houston in the 1950s, he soon joined St. Martin's Episcopal Church, which he affiliated with for the rest of his life. While living in Washington, he attended services at St. John's Episcopal Church.
42. Bill Clinton – Baptist
  - Clinton, during his presidency, attended a Methodist church in Washington along with his wife Hillary Clinton, who is Methodist from childhood.
43. George W. Bush – Methodist
  - Bush was raised in the Episcopal Church but converted to Methodism upon his marriage in 1977.
  - Bush has been noted as one the most religious US presidents. He attributes his deep faith to a 1985 meeting with Billy Graham, an influential preacher in the evangelical movement, and researchers have debated his closeness to Evangelicals and his true religious views. Although considered an ally of the American evangelical movement in office, and claimed as an evangelical by some in the movement, Bush has never claimed to be born again and has not fully embraced standard evangelical doctrines. NBC News interviewed several theologians and colleagues of Bush, and their descriptions of his religious views varied, including "mainstream evangelical with a higher-than-normal tolerance of dissent", "conservative Christian [but] less doctrinaire than his faith would suggest", ecumenical "mere Christian", and "indigenous West Texas evangelical piety".
44. Barack Obama – Unspecified Protestant
  - Obama's resignation from Trinity United Church of Christ in the course of the Jeremiah Wright controversy ended more than 20 years of affiliation with the United Church of Christ. As president he attended several different Christian churches. For the most part, he has attended Methodist churches. In his childhood Obama sometimes attended Sunday school at the First Unitarian Church of Honolulu.
  - A widespread conspiracy theory stated that Obama is Muslim. His stepfather Lolo Soetoro was a liberal Muslim, and his biological father Barack Obama Sr., was raised a Muslim before turning atheist, but there is no evidence that Obama was raised in the faith. During his childhood in Indonesia, Obama attended a Catholic school and later a secular public school that provided Christian religious education, and the claim that he attended an Islamic madrasa is considered debunked.
45. Donald Trump – Unspecified Protestant
46. Joe Biden – Roman Catholic
  - Biden is a lifelong Catholic, with Reuters describing his religious beliefs as "well-known and documented". Catholic social teaching has been cited as a major influence on his political views. In 2008, he was reported to regularly attend Sunday Mass at St. Joseph on the Brandywine in Greenville, Delaware. He continued to attend services there, or at other Catholic churches, during most weeks of his presidency.
47. Donald Trump – Unspecified Protestant

== Affiliation totals ==
Religion	#	Branch	#	Further branch	#	Denomination	#
Christian	45	Protestant	37	Calvinist	11	Presbyterian	4
Christian	45	Protestant	37	Calvinist	11	Dutch Reformed	2
Christian	45	Protestant	37	Calvinist	11	Congregationalist	2
Christian	45	Protestant	37	Calvinist	11	Southern Presbyterian	1
Christian	45	Protestant	37	Calvinist	11	United Presbyterian	1
Christian	45	Protestant	37	Calvinist	11	Presbyterian	1
Christian	45	Protestant	37	Anglican	10	Episcopalian	10
Christian	45	Protestant	37	Methodist	4	Methodist Episcopalian	3
Christian	45	Protestant	37	Methodist	4	United Methodist	1
Christian	45	Protestant	37	Baptist	4	Southern Baptist	2
Christian	45	Protestant	37	Baptist	4	Northern Baptist	1
Christian	45	Protestant	37	Baptist	4	No specific denomination	1
Christian	45	Protestant	37	Restorationist	2	Disciples of Christ	2
Christian	45	Protestant	37	Quaker			2
Christian	45	Protestant	37	Nondenominational			4
Christian	45	Nontrinitarian	5	Unitarian	5	No specific denomination	2
Christian	45	Nontrinitarian	5	Unitarian	5	Unitarian	3
Christian	45	Catholic	2	Latin Church			2
Christian	45	None Specified					1
Total individuals							45 (Note: Grover Cleveland (who was both the 22nd and 24th president) and Donald Trump (who was both the 45th and 47th president) are counted only once.)

== See also ==
- Religious affiliations of vice presidents of the United States
- Religious affiliation in the United States House of Representatives
- Religious affiliation in the United States Senate

Other countries

- List of prime ministers of Canada by religious affiliation
- Religious affiliations of chancellors of Germany
- Religious affiliations of presidents of Lebanon
- Religious affiliations of prime ministers of the Netherlands
- Religious backgrounds of prime ministers of the United Kingdom
