= Religious affiliations of vice presidents of the United States =

The following is a list of religious affiliations of vice presidents of the United States.

== By term ==
No.	Portrait	Name	Term	Religious affiliation
1		John Adams	1789–1797	Unitarian, formerly Congregationalist
2		Thomas Jefferson	1797–1801	Christian Deist/Deist. Although raised as an Anglican, Jefferson later in life rejected the idea of the divinity of Jesus and became a deist.
3		Aaron Burr	1801–1805	Presbyterian, later rejected the Resurrection of Jesus
4		George Clinton	1805–1812	Dutch Reformed
5		Elbridge Gerry	1813–1814	Episcopalian
6		Daniel D. Tompkins	1817–1825	Presbyterian
7		John C. Calhoun	1825–1832	Presbyterian; Unitarian
8		Martin Van Buren	1833–1837	Dutch Reformed
9		Richard M. Johnson	1837–1841	Baptist
10		John Tyler	1841	Episcopalian
11		George M. Dallas	1845–1849	Episcopalian
12		Millard Fillmore	1849–1850	Unitarian
13		William R. King	1853	Protestant
14		John C. Breckinridge	1857–1861	Presbyterian
15		Hannibal Hamlin	1861–1865	Protestant
16		Andrew Johnson	1865	No specific denomination, occasionally attended Methodist services with his wife.
17		Schuyler Colfax	1869–1873	Protestant
18		Henry Wilson	1873–1875	Congregationalist
19		William A. Wheeler	1877–1881	Presbyterian
20		Chester A. Arthur	1881	Episcopalian
21		Thomas A. Hendricks	1885	Presbyterian; Episcopalian
22		Levi P. Morton	1889–1893	Episcopalian, formerly Congregationalist
23		Adlai E. Stevenson	1893–1897	Presbyterian
24		Garret A. Hobart	1897–1899	Presbyterian
25		Theodore Roosevelt	1901	Dutch Reformed
26		Charles W. Fairbanks	1905–1909	Protestant
27		James S. Sherman	1909–1912	Reformed
28		Thomas R. Marshall	1913–1921	Presbyterian
29		Calvin Coolidge	1921–1923	Congregationalist
30		Charles G. Dawes	1925–1929	Presbyterian
31		Charles Curtis	1929–1933	Protestant
32		John Nance Garner	1933–1941	Protestant
33		Henry A. Wallace	1941–1945	Presbyterian; Episcopalian;
34		Harry S. Truman	1945	Baptist
35		Alben W. Barkley	1949–1953	Methodist
36		Richard Nixon	1953–1961	Quaker
37		Lyndon B. Johnson	1961–1963	Disciples of Christ
38		Hubert Humphrey	1965–1969	Lutheran; Methodist; Congregationalist
39		Spiro Agnew	1969–1973	Greek Orthodox; Episcopalian (baptized Episcopalian) (Note: Agnew's father was Greek Orthodox and his mother was Episcopalian. In accordance with his mother's wishes, the infant Spiro was baptized as an Episcopalian. In 1969, however, after his vice presidential inauguration, Baltimore's Greek community endowed a scholarship in Theodore Agnew's name, Spiro Agnew told the gathering: "I am proud to say that I grew up in the light of my father. My beliefs are his.")
40		Gerald Ford	1973–1974	Episcopalian
41		Nelson Rockefeller	1974–1977	Baptist
42		Walter Mondale	1977–1981	Presbyterian
43		George H. W. Bush	1981–1989	Episcopalian
44		Dan Quayle	1989-1993	Presbyterian
45		Al Gore	1993–2001	Southern Baptist
46		Dick Cheney	2001–2009	Methodist
47		Joe Biden	2009–2017	Catholic
48		Mike Pence	2017–2021	Evangelical, formerly Catholic
49		Kamala Harris	2021–2025	Baptist. Attended Hindu services with her mother as a child.
50		JD Vance	2025–present	Catholic, formerly Protestant

== Affiliation totals ==
Affiliation	
Protestant (all denominations) (Note: Includes non-denominational Christianity.)	48
Presbyterian	13
Episcopalian	11
Protestant (unspecified)	6
Baptist	5
Dutch Reformed	3
Congregationalist	4
Methodist	4
Unitarian	3
Catholic	2
Deist	1
Lutheran	1
Disciples of Christ	1
Evangelical	1
Greek Orthodox	1
Quaker	1

== See also ==
- Religious affiliations of presidents of the United States
- Religious affiliation in the United States House of Representatives
- Religious affiliation in the United States Senate
