= Roman Rite in the United States =

The Roman Rite of the Catholic Church is celebrated worldwide but allows for certain liturgical aspects to vary by geographical area. The Roman Rite in the United States is under the purview of the United States Conference of Catholic Bishops; with the permission of the Holy See, the conference has made adaptations to the liturgical calendar and rubrics, and has promulgated liturgical books for use in the United States.

== Proper calendars ==
Proper calendars are those which build off of the General Calendar of the Roman Rite. The contents of particular calendars for the United States are listed below, with each entry prefaced by a notation indicating the type of change made from the basis of the general calendar.

=== National calendar ===
The proper calendar for the United States is given in the U.S. edition of the Roman Missal.

Change	Month	Day	Title of the liturgy	Rank	Color
Transferred (Note: This entry is listed under a different date on the General Roman Calendar (January 6) but is transferred here in this calendar.)	January	Sun, 2–8	The Epiphany of the Lord	Solemnity	White
Added	January	4	Saint Elizabeth Ann Seton, Religious	Memorial	White
Added	January	5	Saint John Neumann, Bishop	Memorial	White
Added	January	6	Saint André Bessette, Religious	Optional Memorial	White
Added	January	22 (Note: This liturgy is transferred to January 23 when January 22 falls on a Sunday.)	Day of Prayer for the Legal Protection of Unborn Children	Obligatory Day of Prayer	White or Violet
Transferred (Note: This entry is listed under a different date on the General Roman Calendar (January 22) but is transferred here in this calendar.)	January	23	Saint Vincent, Deacon and Martyr	Optional Memorial	Red
Added	January	23	Saint Marianne Cope, Virgin	Optional Memorial	White
Added	March	3	Saint Katharine Drexel, Virgin	Optional Memorial	White
Added	May	10	Saint Damien de Veuster, Priest	Optional Memorial	White
Added	May	15	Saint Isidore	Optional Memorial	White
Transferred (Note: This entry is listed under a different date on the General Roman Calendar (the Thursday after Trinity Sunday) but is transferred here in this calendar.)	Sunday after Trinity		The Most Holy Body and Blood of Christ	Solemnity	White
Added	July	1	Saint Junípero Serra, Priest	Optional Memorial	White
Added	July	4	Independence Day	Optional Mass	White
Transferred (Note: This entry is listed under a different date on the General Roman Calendar (July 4) but is transferred here in this calendar.)	July	5	Saint Elizabeth of Portugal	Optional Memorial	White
Added	July	14	Saint Kateri Tekakwitha, Virgin	Memorial	White
Added	July	18	Saint Camillus de Lellis, Priest	Optional Memorial	White
Added	September	9	Saint Peter Claver, Priest	Memorial	White
Added	October	5	Blessed Francis Xavier Seelos, Priest	Optional Memorial	White
Added	October	6	Blessed Marie Rose Durocher, Virgin	Optional Memorial	White
Added	October	19	Saints John de Brébeuf and Isaac Jogues, Priests, and Companions, Martyrs	Memorial	Red
Transferred (Note: This entry is listed under a different date on the General Roman Calendar (October 19) but is transferred here in this calendar.)	October	20	Saint Paul of the Cross, Priest	Optional Memorial	White
Added	November	13	Saint Frances Xavier Cabrini, Virgin	Memorial	White
Added	November	18	Saint Rose Philippine Duchesne, Virgin	Optional Memorial	White
Added	November	23	Blessed Miguel Agustín Pro, Priest and Martyr	Optional Memorial	Red
Added	November	4th Thu	Thanksgiving Day	Optional Mass	White
Subtitled (Note: This entry is listed on the General Roman Calendar, but here an extra appellation is added to indicate its significance as the patronal feast day.)	December	8	Immaculate Conception of the Blessed Virgin Mary (Patronal Feastday of the United States of America)	Solemnity	White
Elevated (Note: This entry is listed on the General Roman Calendar but with the lower rank of Optional Memorial.)	December	12	Our Lady of Guadalupe	Feast	White

=== Hispanic patronal feast day calendar ===
In addition to having its own English-language Roman Missal, the United States has a proper edition of the Misal Romano in the Spanish language. This Spanish missal follows the national calendar given above, but also adds a section of Masses for the patronal feasts of Spanish-speaking nations. These feast days are intended to be celebrated with groups of immigrants from the corresponding countries.

Change	Month	Day	Country	Title of the liturgy	Rank	Color
Added	January	15	Guatemala	Holy Christ of Esquipulas	Votive Mass	White
Added	January	21	Dominican Republic	Our Lady of Altagracia	Votive Mass	White
Added	February	3	Honduras	Our Lady of Suyapa	Votive Mass	White
Added	May	8	Argentina	Our Lady of Luján	Votive Mass	White
Added	July	9	Colombia	Our Lady of the Rosary of Chiquinquirá	Votive Mass	White
Propers substituted (Note: This entry is found in the General Roman Calendar but the liturgical prayers are different.)	July	16	Chile	Our Lady of Mount Carmel	Votive Mass	White
Added	August	2	Costa Rica	Our Lady of the Angels	Votive Mass	White
Added	August	5	Bolivia	Our Lady of Copacabana	Votive Mass	White
Renamed (Note: This entry is found in the General Roman Calendar but under a different name (Transfiguration of the Lord).)	August	6	El Salvador	The Savior of the World	Feast (Transfiguration)	White
	August	15	Paraguay	Assumption of the Blessed Virgin Mary	Solemnity	White
Added	September	8	Cuba	Our Lady of Charity of El Cobre	Votive Mass	White
Added	September	9	Panama	Saint Mary the Ancient	Votive Mass	White
Added	September	11	Venezuela	Our Lady of Coromoto	Votive Mass	White
Added	October	12	Spain	Our Lady of the Pillar	Votive Mass	White
Added	October	28	Peru	The Lord of Miracles	Votive Mass	White
Added	November	8	Uruguay	Our Lady of the Thirty-Three Orientals	Votive Mass	White
Added	November	19	Puerto Rico	Holy Mary, Mother of Divine Providence	Votive Mass	White
Renamed (Note: This entry is found in the General Roman Calendar but under a different name (Presentation of the Blessed Virgin Mary).)	November	21	Ecuador	Our Lady of the Presentation of El Quinche	Memorial (Presentation of Mary)	White
Renamed (Note: This entry is found in the General Roman Calendar but under a different name (Immaculate Conception of the Blessed Virgin Mary).)	December	8	Nicaragua	The Most Pure Conception of Mary	Solemnity (Immaculate Conception)	White
	December	12	Mexico	Our Lady of Guadalupe	Feast	White

=== Ordinariate calendar ===
The Personal Ordinariate of the Chair of Saint Peter is a personal ordinariate for former Anglicans that encompasses the United States and Canada. The ordinariate has its own liturgical calendar that includes many English feast days.

Change	Month	Day	Title of the liturgy	Rank	Color
Added	January	12	Saint Benedict Biscop, Abbot	Optional Memorial	White
Added	February	4	Saint Gilbert of Sempringham, Religious	Optional Memorial	White
Elevated (Note: This entry is listed on the General Roman Calendar but with the lower rank of Feast.)	February	22	Chair of Saint Peter the Apostle	Solemnity	White
Added	March	1	Saint David, Bishop	Optional Memorial	White
Elevated (Note: This entry is listed on the General Roman Calendar but with the lower rank of Optional Memorial.)	April	23	Saint George, Martyr	Memorial	Red
Transferred (Note: This entry is listed under a different date on the General Roman Calendar (April 23) but is transferred here in this calendar.)	April	24	Saint Adalbert, Bishop and Martyr	Optional Memorial	Red
Added	May	4	The English Martyrs	Memorial	Red
Added	May	19	Saints Dunstan, Ethelwold, and Oswald, Bishops	Optional Memorial	White
Added	June	9	Saint Columba, Abbot	Optional Memorial	White
Added	June	16	Saint Richard of Chichester, Bishop	Optional Memorial	White
Added	June	20	Saint Alban, protomartyr of England	Optional Memorial	White
Elevated (Note: This entry is listed on the General Roman Calendar but with the lower rank of Optional Memorial.)	June	22	Saints John Fisher, Bishop, and Thomas More, Martyrs	Memorial	Red
Transferred (Note: This entry is listed under a different date on the General Roman Calendar (June 22) but is transferred here in this calendar.)	June	23	Paulinus of Nola, Bishop	Optional Memorial	White
Added	June	23	Saints Hilda, Etheldreda, and Mildred, and All Holy Nuns	Optional Memorial	White
Added	July	9	Our Lady of the Atonement	Optional Memorial	White
Added	August	30	Saints Margaret Clitherow, Anne Line, and Margaret Ward, Martyrs	Optional Memorial	Red
Added	August	31	Saint Aidan, Bishop, and the Saints of Lindisfarne	Optional Memorial	White
Added	September	4	Saint Cuthbert, Bishop	Optional Memorial	White
Added	September	19	Saint Theodore of Canterbury, Bishop	Optional Memorial	White
Added	September	19	Saint Adrian, Abbot	Optional Memorial	White
Added	September	24	Our Lady of Walsingham, Patroness of the Ordinariate	Feast	White
Transferred (Note: This entry is listed under a different date on the General Roman Calendar (October 9) but is transferred here in this calendar.)	October	8	Saint Denis and Companions, Martyrs	Optional Memorial	Red
Transferred (Note: This entry is listed under a different date on the General Roman Calendar (October 9) but is transferred here in this calendar.)	October	8	Saint John Leonardi, Priest	Optional Memorial	White
Added	October	9	Saint John Henry Newman, Priest	Optional Memorial	White
Added	October	12	Saint Wilfrid	Optional Memorial	White
Added	October	13	Saint Edward the Confessor	Optional Memorial	White
Added	November	20	Saint Edmund, Martyr	Optional Memorial	Red

== See also ==
- National calendars of the Roman Rite
