= 111th United States Congress =

2009–2011 U.S. legislative term

←	110th	112th	→
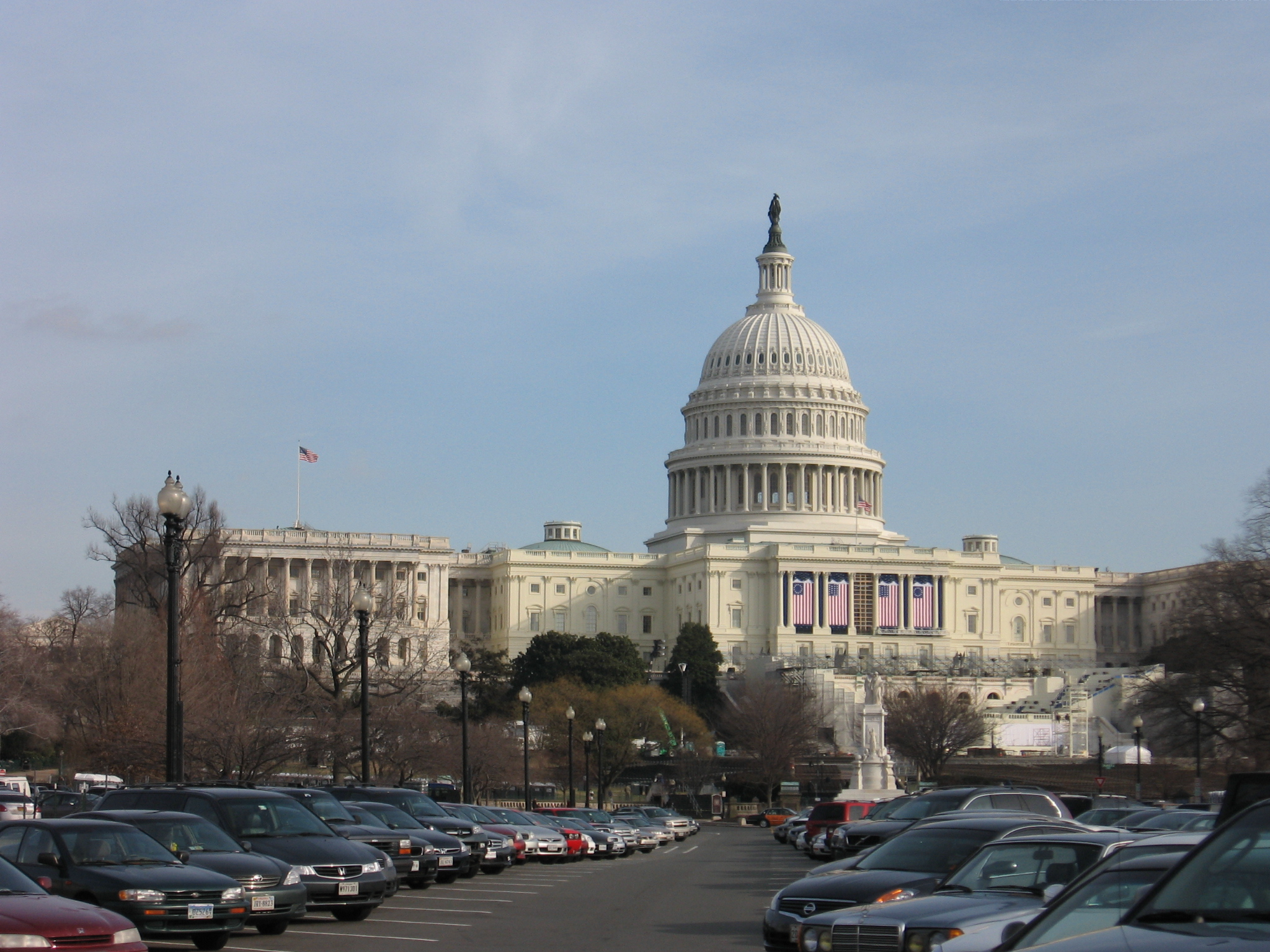
- United States Capitol (2009)

Overview
- Legislative body: United States Congress
- Jurisdiction: United States
- Term: January 3, 2009 – January 3, 2011

Senate
- Members: 100
- President: Dick Cheney (R) (Note: U.S. Vice President Dick Cheney's term as President of the Senate ended at noon on January 20, 2009, when Joe Biden's term began.) (until January 20, 2009); Joe Biden (D) (from January 20, 2009)
- President pro tempore: Robert Byrd (D) (until June 28, 2010); Daniel Inouye (D) (from June 28, 2010)
- Party control: Democratic

House of Representatives
- Members: 435 representatives 6 non-voting delegates
- Speaker: Nancy Pelosi (D)
- Party control: Democratic

Sessions
- 1st: January 6, 2009 – December 24, 2009
- 2nd: January 5, 2010 – December 22, 2010

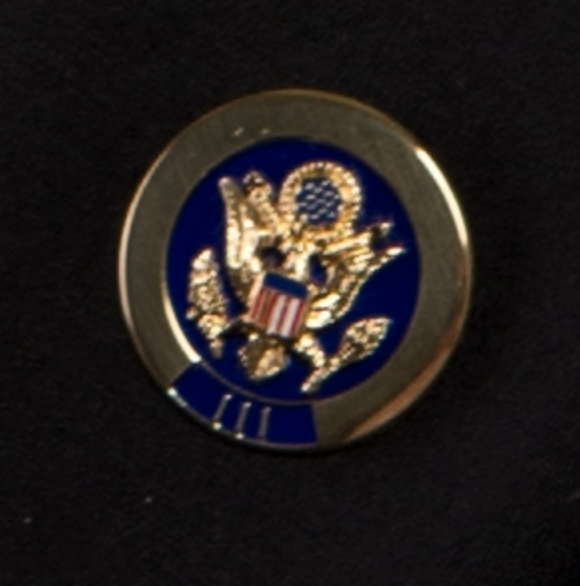
House of Representatives member pin for the 111th U.S. Congress

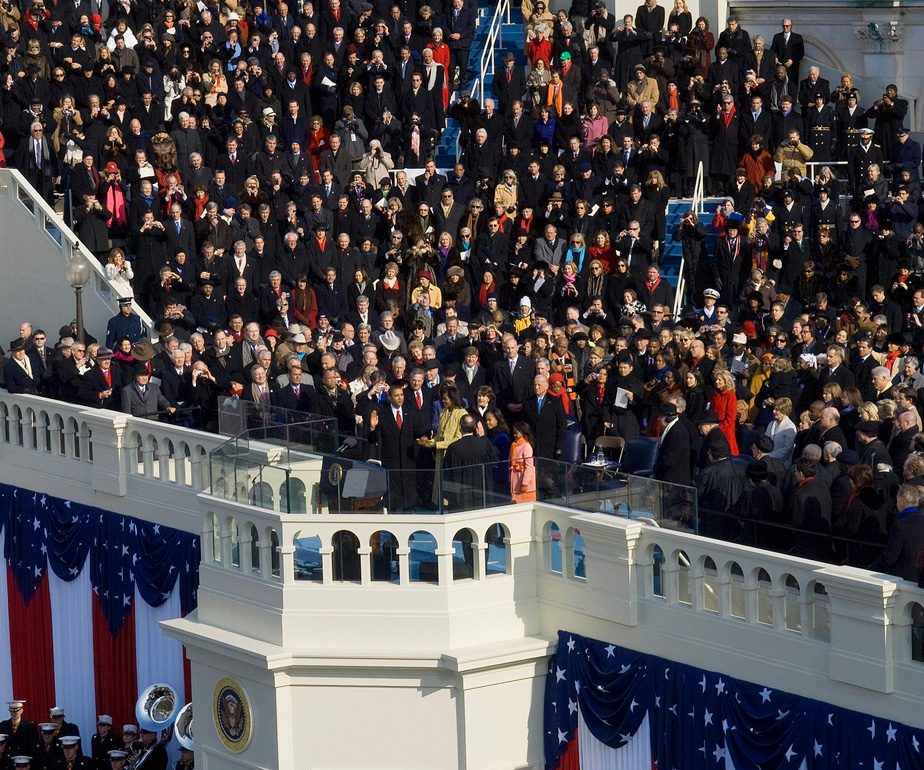
Inauguration of Barack Obama at the U.S. Capitol, January 20, 2009.

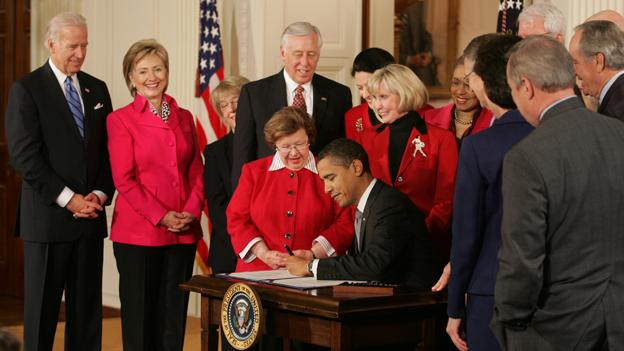
President Obama signing the Lilly Ledbetter Fair Pay Act of 2009 into law, January 29, 2009.

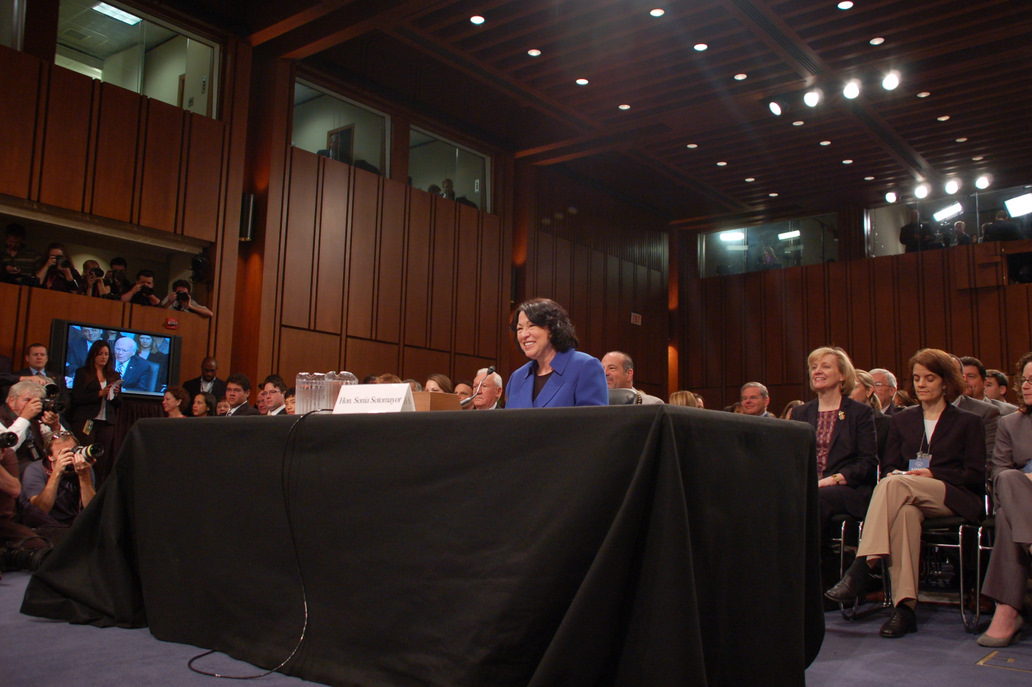
Sonia Sotomayor testifying before the Senate Judiciary Committee on her appointment to the U.S. Supreme Court, July 13, 2009.

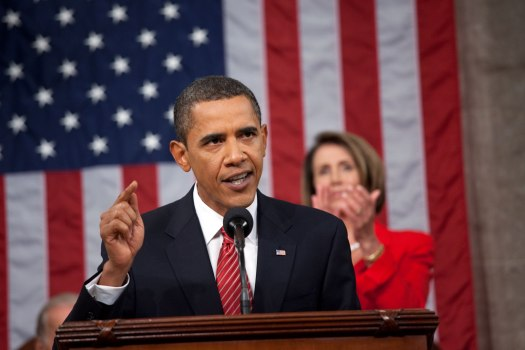
President Obama addressing Congress regarding health care reform, September 9, 2009.

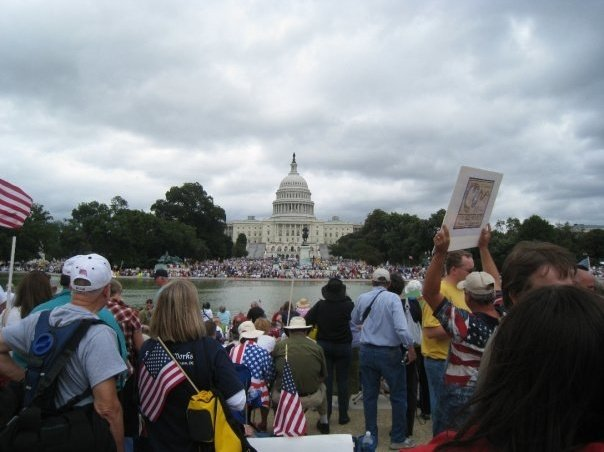
Tea Party protests in front of the U.S. Capitol, September 12, 2009.

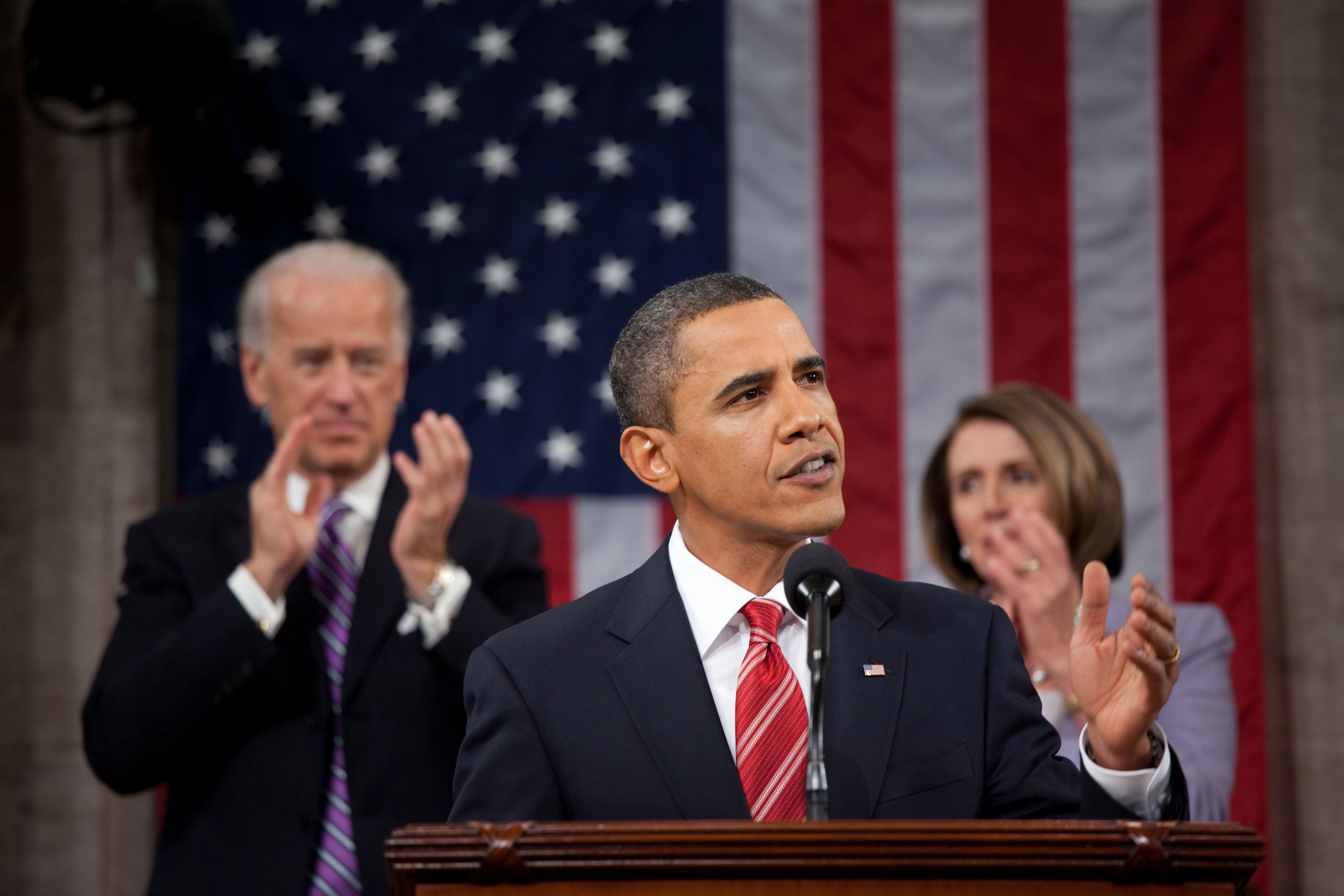
President Obama delivering the 2010 State of the Union Address, January 25, 2010.

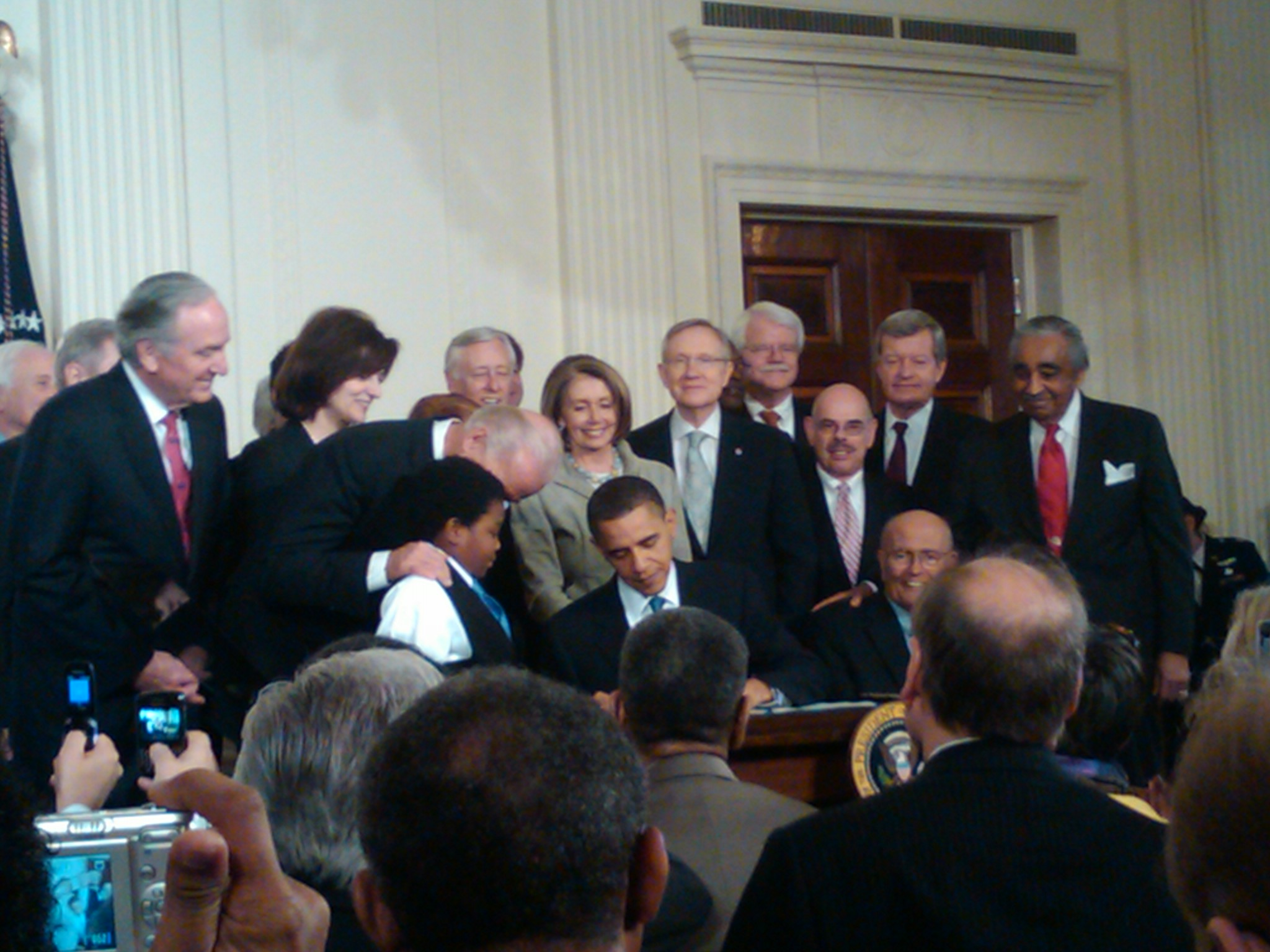
President Obama signing the Patient Protection and Affordable Care Act into law, March 23, 2010.

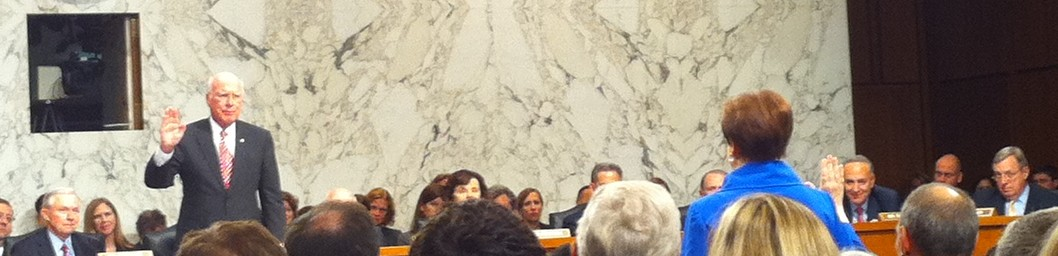
Senate Judiciary Committee Chairman Patrick Leahy swearing in Elena Kagan during her first day of testimony on her appointment to the U.S. Supreme Court, June 28, 2010.

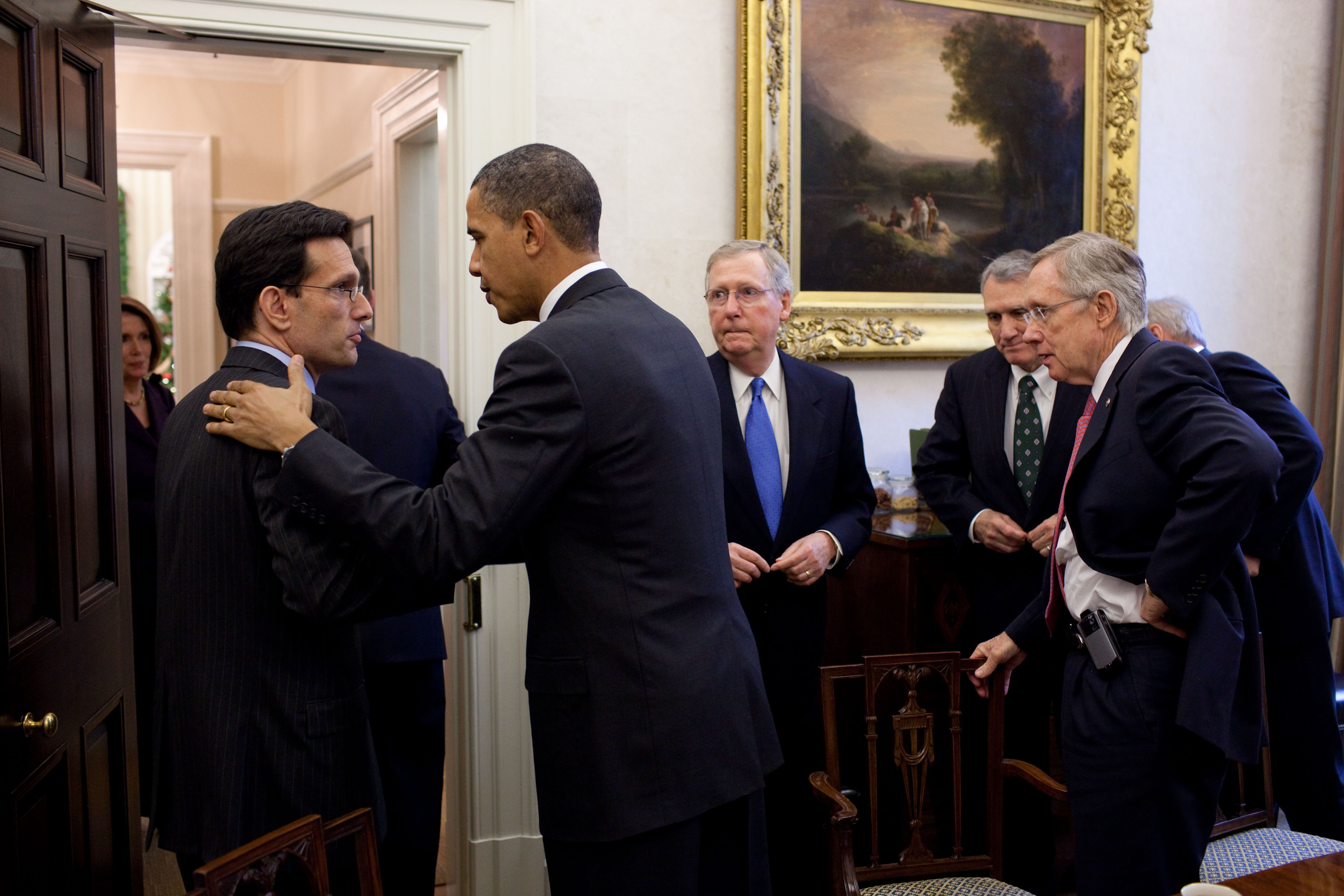
Congressional leaders meeting with President Obama, November 30, 2010.

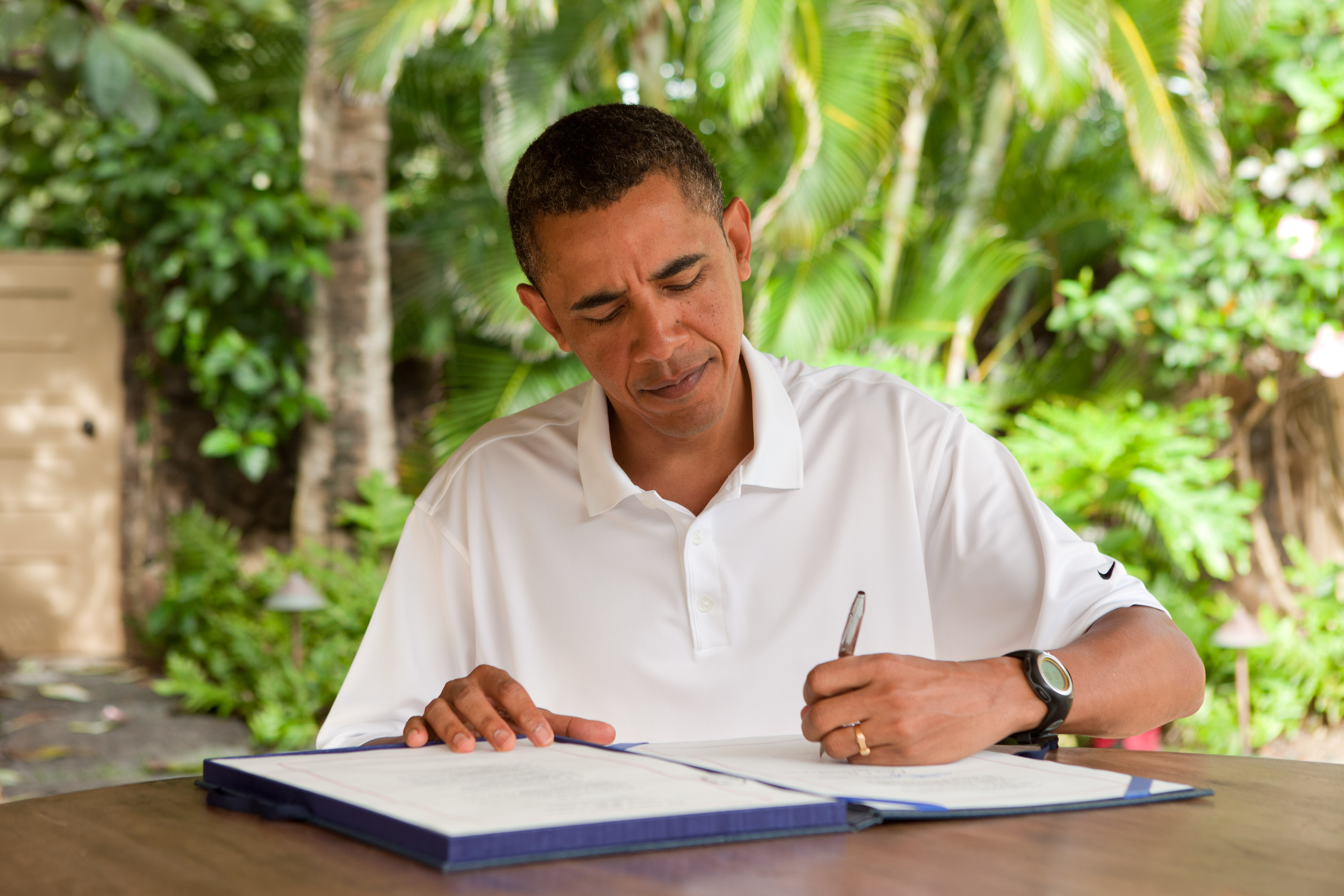
President Obama signing the James Zadroga 9/11 Health and Compensation Act of 2010 into law, January 2, 2011.

The 111th United States Congress was a meeting of the legislative branch of the United States federal government from January 3, 2009, until January 3, 2011. It began during the last weeks of the George W. Bush administration, with the remainder spanning the first two years of Barack Obama's presidency. It was composed of the Senate and the House of Representatives. The apportionment of seats in the House was based on the 2000 U.S. census.

In the November 2008 elections, the Democratic Party increased its majorities in both chambers (including – when factoring in the two Democratic caucusing independents – a brief filibuster-proof 60-40 supermajority in the Senate), and with Barack Obama being sworn in as president on January 20, 2009, this gave Democrats an overall federal government trifecta for the first time since the 103rd Congress in 1993.

However, the Senate supermajority only lasted for a period of 72 working days while the Senate was actually in session. A new delegate seat was created for the Northern Mariana Islands. The 111th Congress had the most long-serving members in history: at the start of the 111th Congress, the average member of the House had served 10.3 years, while the average Senator had served 13.4 years. The Democratic Party would not simultaneously control both the U.S. House of Representatives and the U.S. Senate again until more than a decade later, during the 117th Congress. After comprising the majority of the House of Representatives since the 106th United States Congress, the 111th United States Congress was the first where Baby boomers comprised the majority of the Senate.

The 111th Congress was the most productive congress since the 89th Congress. It enacted numerous significant pieces of legislation, including the Lilly Ledbetter Fair Pay Act, the American Recovery and Reinvestment Act, the Patient Protection and Affordable Care Act, the Dodd–Frank Wall Street Reform and Consumer Protection Act, and the New START treaty.

== Major events ==
- January 2009: Two Senate seats were disputed when the Congress convened:
  1. An appointment dispute over the Illinois seat vacated by President Barack Obama arose following Illinois Governor Rod Blagojevich's solicitation of bribes in exchange for an appointment to the Senate. Roland Burris (D) was appointed to the seat on December 31, 2008, but his credentials were not accepted until January 12, 2009.
  2. An election dispute over the Minnesota seat previously held by Norm Coleman (R), between Coleman and challenger Al Franken (D), was decided on June 30, 2009, in favor of Franken. Franken's admission briefly gave the Senate Democratic caucus 60 votes, enough to defeat a filibuster in a party-line vote.
- January 8, 2009: Joint session counted the Electoral College votes of the 2008 presidential election.
- January 20, 2009: Barack Obama became 44th President of the United States.
- February 24, 2009: President Obama addressed a joint session of Congress
- April 28, 2009: Senator Arlen Specter switched from the Republican Party to the Democratic Party.
- August 25, 2009: Senator Ted Kennedy died of a Brain tumor
- September 9, 2009: President Obama addressed a joint session of Congress to promote health care reform, which Representative Joe Wilson (R) interrupted by shouting at the President.
- January 21, 2010: Citizens United v. FEC: The U.S. Supreme Court struck down limits on campaign contributions by nonprofits, corporations, labor unions and other associations.
- January 25, 2010: 2010 State of the Union Address
- February 4, 2010: Republican Scott Brown's election to the Senate ended the Democratic super-majority.
- April 20 – September 19, 2010: Deepwater Horizon oil spill
- November 2, 2010: 2010 general elections, in which Republicans regained control of the House while the Democrats remained in control of the Senate.

== Major legislation ==
=== Enacted ===
- January 29, 2009: Lilly Ledbetter Fair Pay Act of 2009, Pub. L. 111–2 (text) (PDF)
- February 4, 2009: Children's Health Insurance Program Reauthorization Act (SCHIP), Pub. L. 111–3 (text) (PDF)
- February 17, 2009: American Recovery and Reinvestment Act of 2009 (ARRA), Pub. L. 111–5 (text) (PDF)
- March 11, 2009: Omnibus Appropriations Act, 2009, Pub. L. 111–8 (text) (PDF)
- March 30, 2009: Omnibus Public Land Management Act of 2009, Pub. L. 111–11 (text) (PDF)
- April 21, 2009: Edward M. Kennedy Serve America Act, Pub. L. 111–13 (text) (PDF)
- May 20, 2009: Fraud Enforcement and Recovery Act of 2009, Pub. L. 111–21 (text) (PDF)
- May 20, 2009: Helping Families Save Their Homes Act of 2009, Pub. L. 111–22 (text) (PDF)
- May 22, 2009: Weapon Systems Acquisition Reform Act of 2009, Pub. L. 111–23 (text) (PDF)
- May 22, 2009: Credit CARD Act of 2009, Pub. L. 111–24 (text) (PDF)
- June 22, 2009: Family Smoking Prevention and Tobacco Control Act, as Division A of Pub. L. 111–31 (text) (PDF)
- June 24, 2009: Supplemental Appropriations Act of 2009 including the Car Allowance Rebate System (Cash for Clunkers), Pub. L. 111–32 (text) (PDF)
- October 15, 2009: Enhanced Partnership with Pakistan Act, Pub.L. 111-73
- October 28, 2009: National Defense Authorization Act for Fiscal Year 2010, including the Matthew Shepard and James Byrd Jr. Hate Crimes Prevention Act, Pub. L. 111–84 (text) (PDF)
- November 6, 2009: Worker, Homeownership, and Business Assistance Act of 2009, Pub. L. 111–92 (text) (PDF)
- November 11, 2009: Military Spouses Residency Relief Act of 2010, Pub.L. 111-97
- December 16, 2009: Consolidated Appropriations Act, 2010, Pub. L. 111–117 (text) (PDF)
- January 27, 2010: Emergency Aid to American Survivors of the Haiti Earthquake Act, Pub.L. 111-127
- February 12, 2010: Statutory Pay-As-You-Go Act, as Title I of Pub. L. 111–139 (text) (PDF)
- March 4, 2010: Travel Promotion Act of 2009, as Section 9 of Pub. L. 111–145 (text) (PDF)
- March 18, 2010: Hiring Incentives to Restore Employment Act, including the Foreign Account Tax Compliance Act Pub. L. 111–147 (text) (PDF)
- March 23, 2010: Patient Protection and Affordable Care Act, including the Community Living Assistance Services and Supports Act (later repealed) Pub. L. 111–148 (text) (PDF)
- March 30, 2010: Health Care and Education Reconciliation Act of 2010, including the Student Aid and Fiscal Responsibility Act, Pub. L. 111–152 (text) (PDF)
- May 5, 2010: Caregivers and Veterans Omnibus Health Services Act of 2010, Pub. L. 111–163 (text) (PDF)
- May 24, 2010: Lord's Resistance Army Disarmament and Northern Uganda Recovery Act, Pub.L. 111-172
- May 27, 2010: Satellite Television Extension and Localism Act (STELA), Pub.L. 111-175
- July 1, 2010: Comprehensive Iran Sanctions, Accountability, and Divestment Act of 2010, Pub. L. 111–195 (text) (PDF)
- July 21, 2010: Dodd–Frank Wall Street Reform and Consumer Protection Act, Pub. L. 111–203 (text) (PDF)
- July 22, 2010: Improper Payments Elimination and Recovery Act of 2010, Pub.L. 111-204
- July 22, 2010: Unemployment Compensation Extension Act of 2010, Pub.L. 111-205
- July 29, 2010: Tribal Law and Order Act of 2010
- August 3, 2010: Fair Sentencing Act of 2010, Pub. L. 111–220 (text) (PDF)
- August 10, 2010: Securing the Preservation of Our Enduring and Established Constitutional Heritage Act, Pub. L. 111–223 (text) (PDF)
- September 27, 2010: Small Business Jobs and Credit Act of 2010, Pub. L. 111–240 (text) (PDF)
- October 5, 2010: Rosa's Law, Pub.L. 111-256
- October 8, 2010: Twenty-First Century Communications and Video Accessibility Act (CVAA) of 2010, Pub.L. 111-260
- October 11, 2010: NASA Authorization Act of 2010, Pub.L. 111-267
- October 13, 2010: Plain Writing Act of 2010, Pub.L. 111-274
- October 15, 2010: Pre-Election Presidential Transition Act of 2010, Pub.L. 111-283
- December 8, 2010: Claims Resolution Act of 2010, Pub. L. 111–291 (text) (PDF)
- December 9, 2010: Animal Crush Video Prohibition Act, Pub.L. 111-294
- December 13, 2010: Healthy, Hunger-Free Kids Act of 2010, Pub. L. 111–296 (text) (PDF)
- December 15, 2010: Medicare and Medicaid Extenders Act of 2010, Pub.L. 111-309
- December 15, 2010: Commercial Advertisement Loudness Mitigation (CALM) Act, Pub.L. 111-311
- December 17, 2010: Tax Relief, Unemployment Insurance Reauthorization, and Job Creation Act of 2010, Pub. L. 111–312 (text) (PDF), H.R. 4853
- December 18, 2010: Fur Products Labeling Act, Pub.L. 111-313
- December 22, 2010: Don't Ask, Don't Tell Repeal Act of 2010, Pub. L. 111–321 (text) (PDF), H.R. 2965
- December 22, 2010: Truth In Caller ID Act of 2009, Pub.L. 111-331
- January 2, 2011: James Zadroga 9/11 Health and Compensation Act of 2010, Pub. L. 111–347 (text) (PDF), H.R. 847
- January 4, 2011: Shark Conservation Act, Pub. L. 111–348 (text) (PDF), H.R. 81
- January 4, 2011: GPRA Modernization Act of 2010, Pub.L. 111-352
- January 4, 2011: Food Safety Modernization Act, Pub. L. 111–353 (text) (PDF), H.R. 2751
- January 4, 2011: America COMPETES Reauthorization Act of 2010, Pub.L. 111-358
- January 4, 2011: Local Community Radio Act, Pub.L. 111-371
- January 4, 2011: National Alzheimer's Project Act, Pub.L. 111-375
- January 7, 2011: Ike Skelton National Defense Authorization Act for Fiscal Year 2011, Pub.L. 111-383

=== Health care reform ===
At the encouragement of the Obama administration, Congress devoted significant time considering health care reform. In March 2010, Obama signed the Patient Protection and Affordable Care Act into law, the first comprehensive health care reform legislation in decades, along with further amendments in the Health Care and Education Reconciliation Act of 2010. Other major reform proposals during the health care debate included:

- Affordable Health Care for America Act (known as the House bill)
- America's Affordable Health Choices Act of 2009
- America's Healthy Future Act (known as the Baucus bill)
- Empowering Patients First Act
- Healthy Americans Act (known as the Wyden/Bennett bill)
- United States National Health Care Act (known as the Conyers bill, a single payer proposal)
- Physician Payments Sunshine Act

=== Proposed ===
Proposed bills include (in alphabetical order): (Note: See also: Active Legislation, 111th Congress, via senate.gov)

- American Clean Energy and Security Act
- District of Columbia House Voting Rights Act
- DISCLOSE Act
- Domestic Partnership Benefits and Obligations Act
- DREAM Act
- Employee Free Choice Act
- Employment Non-Discrimination Act
- Federal Reserve Transparency Act of 2009
- Food Desert Oasis Act of 2009
- Food Safety Enhancement Act
- Fracturing Responsibility and Awareness of Chemicals Act
- Gun Show Loophole Closing Act of 2009
- Homeowner's Defense Act
- Industrial Hemp Farming Act of 2009
- Military Readiness Enhancement Act
- Native Hawaiian Government Reorganization Act
- Personal Data Privacy and Security Act of 2009
- Puerto Rico Democracy Act of 2009
- Public Option Act
- Respect for Marriage Act
- Stem Cell Research Enhancement Act
- Uniting American Families Act
- Universal Right to Vote by Mail Act

==== Vetoed ====
- December 30, 2009: H.J.Res. 64, a continuing appropriations resolution that became unnecessary
- October 7, 2010: H.R. 3808, Interstate Recognition of Notarizations Act of 2010

== Treaties ratified ==
- December 22, 2010: New START (111-5)

== Major nomination hearings ==
- January–April 2009: Senate held confirmation hearings for Barack Obama's cabinet.
- July 13–16, 2009: Senate Committee on the Judiciary held a hearing on Sonia Sotomayor's appointment to the United States Supreme Court.
- June 28–30, 2010: Senate Committee on the Judiciary held a hearing on Elena Kagan's appointment to the United States Supreme Court.

== Impeachments ==
- H.Res. 520: Judge Samuel B. Kent: impeached June 19, 2009, resigned June 30, 2009, before trial; charges dismissed July 22, 2009.
- H.Res. 1031: Judge Thomas Porteous: impeached March 11, 2010, convicted December 8, 2010.

== Party summary ==
Resignations and new members are discussed in the "Changes in membership" section, below.

=== Senate ===
Senate membership

Final (from November 29, 2010)

January 3, 2009 – January 15, 2009

January 15, 2009 – January 20, 2009

January 20, 2009 – January 26, 2009

January 26, 2009 – April 30, 2009

April 30, 2009 – July 7, 2009

July 7, 2009 – August 25, 2009

August 25, 2009 – September 9, 2009

September 9, 2009 – September 10, 2009

September 10, 2009 – September 25, 2009

September 25, 2009 – February 4, 2010

February 4, 2010 – June 28, 2010

June 28, 2010 – July 16, 2010

July 16, 2010 – November 29, 2010

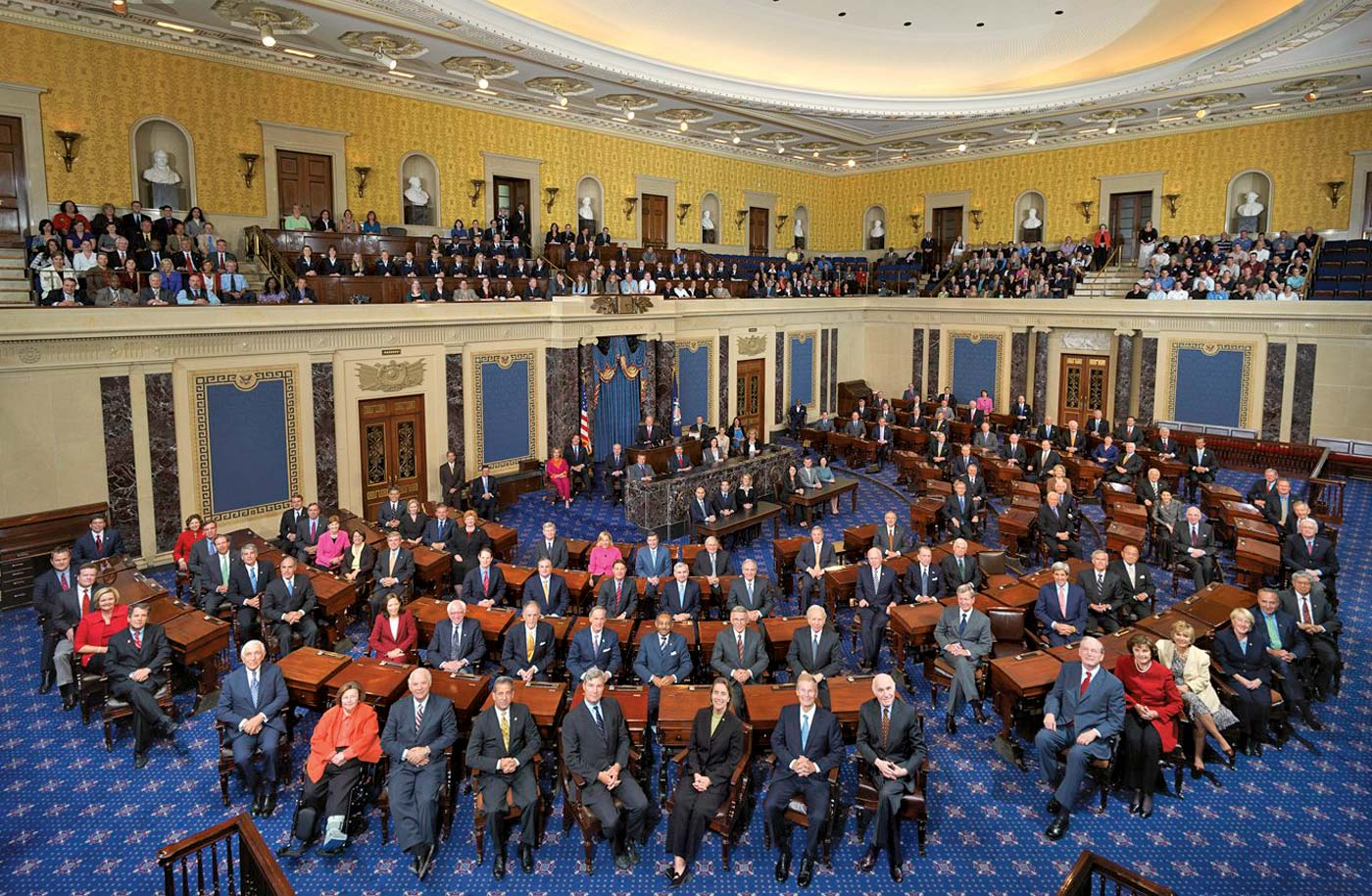
The United States Senate (in 2010)

	Party (Shading indicates majority caucus)			Total	
	Democratic	Independent (caucusing with Democrats)	Republican	Total	Vacant
End of previous Congress	48	2	49	99	1
Begin	55	2	41	98	2
January 15, 2009	56	2	41	99	1
January 20, 2009	55	2	41	98	2
January 26, 2009	56	2	41	99	1
April 30, 2009	57	2	40	99	1
July 7, 2009	58	2	40	100	0
August 25, 2009	57	2	40	99	1
September 9, 2009	57	2	39	98	2
September 10, 2009	57	2	40	99	1
September 25, 2009	58	2	40	100	0
February 4, 2010	57	2	41	100	0
June 28, 2010	56	2	41	99	1
July 16, 2010	57	2	41	100	0
November 29, 2010	56	2	42	100	0
Final voting share	58%		42%		
Beginning of the next Congress	51	2	47	100	0

=== House of Representatives ===
Final House membership 255 Democrats 179 Republicans 1 Vacant

	Party (Shading indicates majority caucus)		Total	
	Democratic	Republican	Total	Vacant
End of previous Congress	235	198	433	2
Begin	256	178	434	1
January 26, 2009	255	178	433	2
February 24, 2009	254	178	432	3
March 31, 2009	255	178	433	2
April 7, 2009	256	178	434	1
June 26, 2009	255	178	433	2
July 14, 2009	256	178	434	1
September 21, 2009	256	177	433	2
November 3, 2009	258	177	435	0
December 22, 2009	257	178	435	0
January 3, 2010	256	178	434	1
February 8, 2010	255	178	433	2
February 28, 2010	254	178	432	3
March 8, 2010	253	178	431	4
March 21, 2010	253	177	430	5
April 13, 2010	254	177	431	4
May 18, 2010	255	177	432	3
May 21, 2010	255	176	431	4
May 22, 2010	255	177	432	3
June 8, 2010	255	178	433	2
November 2, 2010	255	180	435	0
November 29, 2010	255	179	434	1
Final voting share	58.8%	41.2%		
Non-voting members	6	0	6	0
Beginning of next Congress	193	242	435	0

== Leadership ==
Section contents: Senate: Majority (D), Minority (R) • House: Majority (D), Minority (R)

=== Senate ===
Senate President

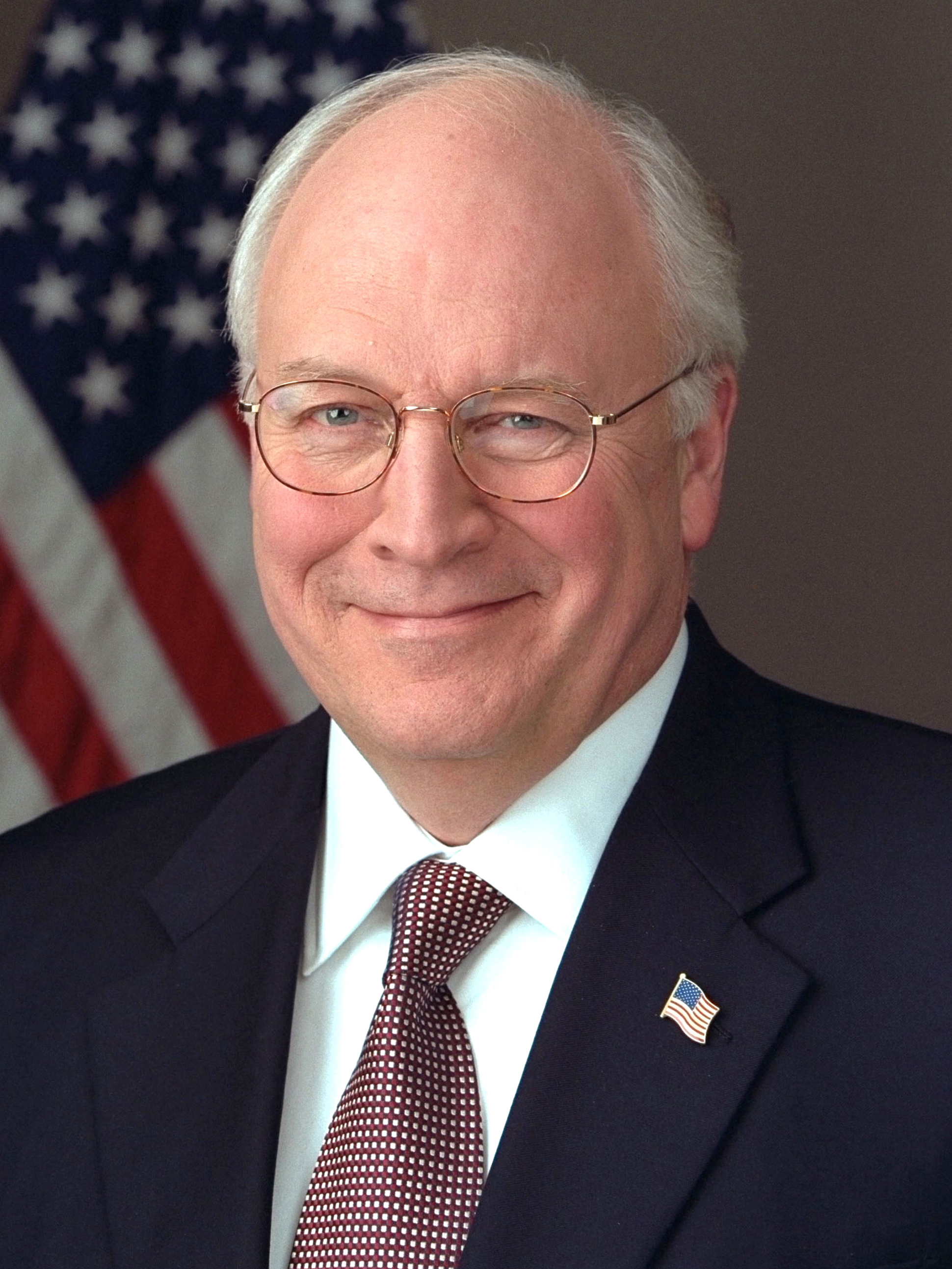
Dick Cheney (R)
(until January 20, 2009)

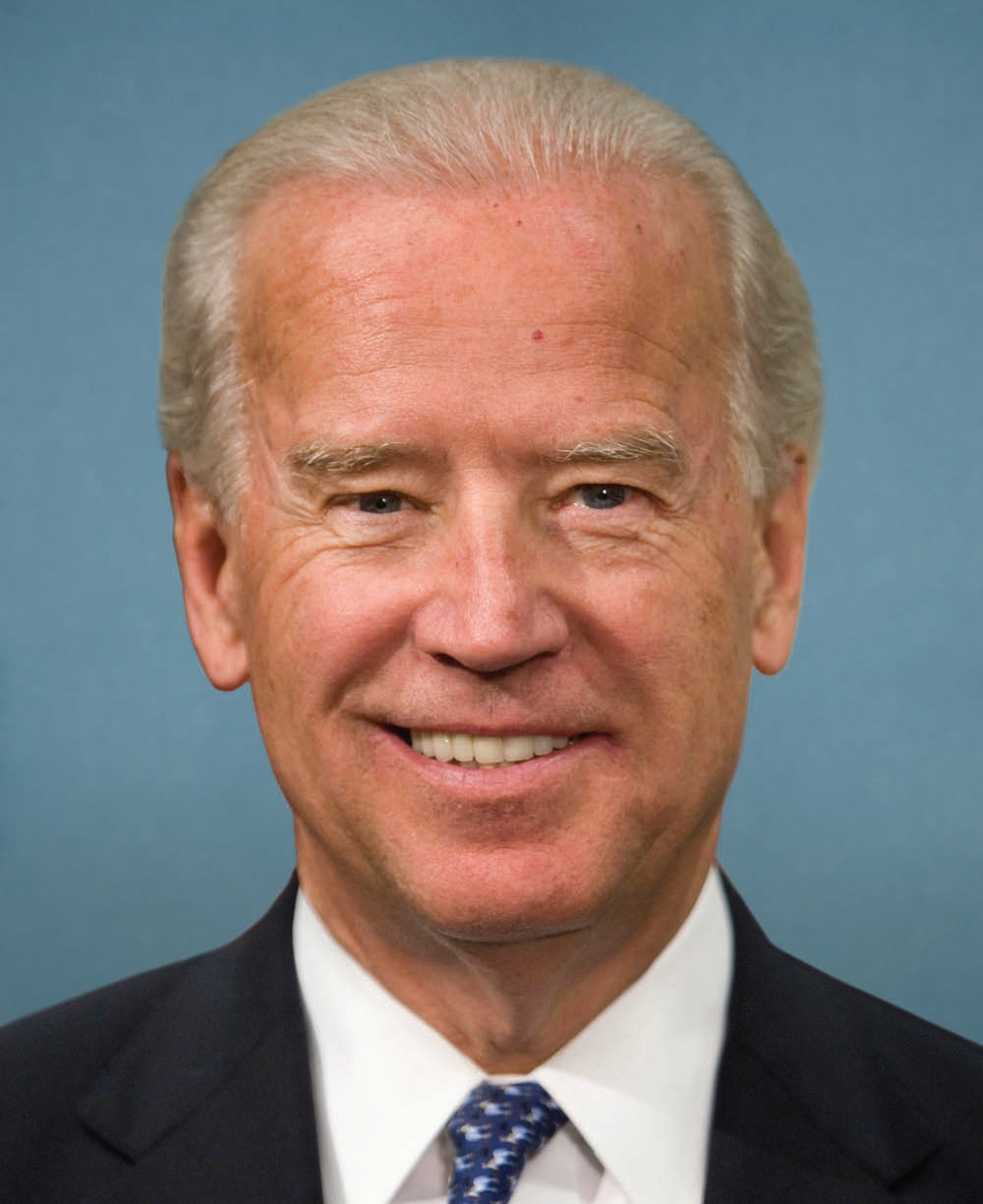
Joe Biden (D)
(from January 20, 2009)

Senate President pro tempore

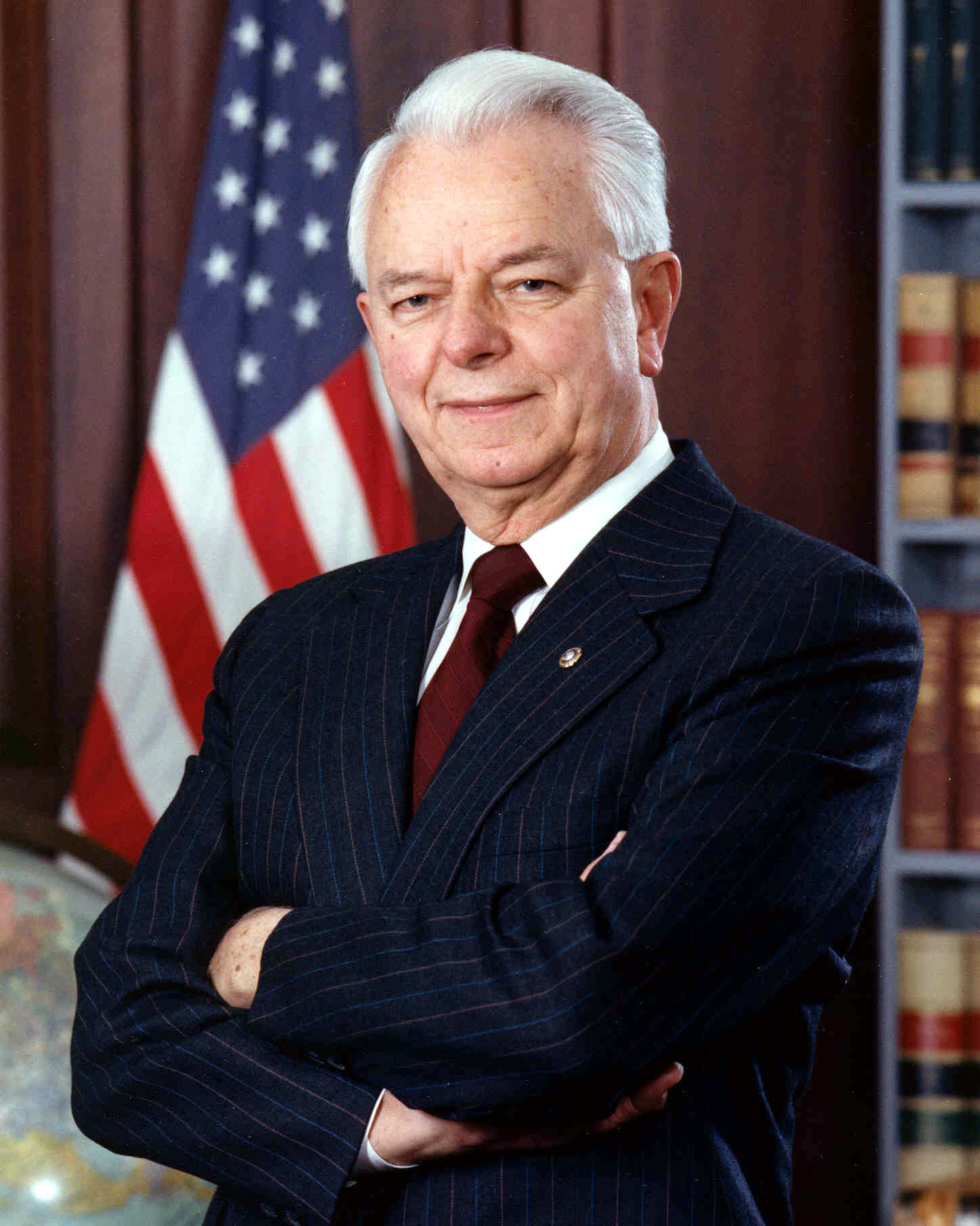
Robert Byrd (D)
(until June 28, 2010)

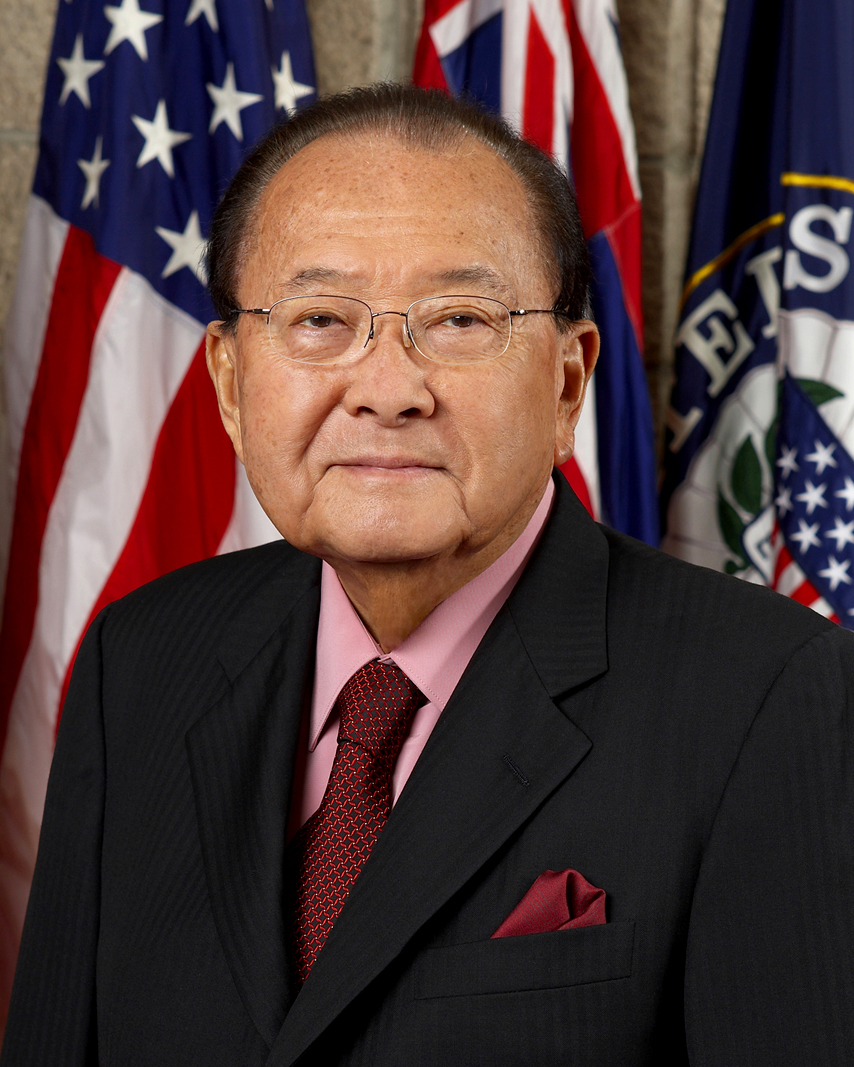
Daniel Inouye (D)
(from June 28, 2010)

- President: Dick Cheney (R), until January 20, 2009
  - Joe Biden (D), from January 20, 2009
- President pro tempore: Robert Byrd (D), until June 28, 2010
  - Daniel Inouye (D), from June 28, 2010

==== Majority (Democratic) leadership ====
- Majority Leader and Conference Chairman: Harry Reid
- Assistant Majority Leader (Majority Whip): Richard Durbin
- Democratic Caucus Vice Chairman: Charles Schumer
- Democratic Conference Secretary: Patty Murray
- Senatorial Campaign Committee Chairman: Bob Menendez
- Policy Committee Chairman: Byron Dorgan
- Steering and Outreach Committee Chairman: Debbie Stabenow
- Committee Outreach Chairman: Jeff Bingaman
- Rural Outreach Chairman: Blanche Lincoln
- Chief Deputy Whip: Barbara Boxer
- Deputy Whips: Tom Carper, Bill Nelson, and Russ Feingold

==== Minority (Republican) leadership ====
- Minority Leader: Mitch McConnell
- Assistant Minority Leader (Minority Whip): Jon Kyl
- Counselor to the Minority Leader: Bob Bennett
- Republican Conference Chairman: Lamar Alexander
- Republican Conference Vice Chairman: Lisa Murkowski, until September 17, 2010
  - John Barrasso, from September 22, 2010
- Policy Committee Chairman: John Ensign, until June 17, 2009
  - John Thune, from June 25, 2009
- National Senatorial Committee Chair: John Cornyn
- Chief Deputy Whip: Richard Burr

=== House of Representatives ===
Speaker of the House

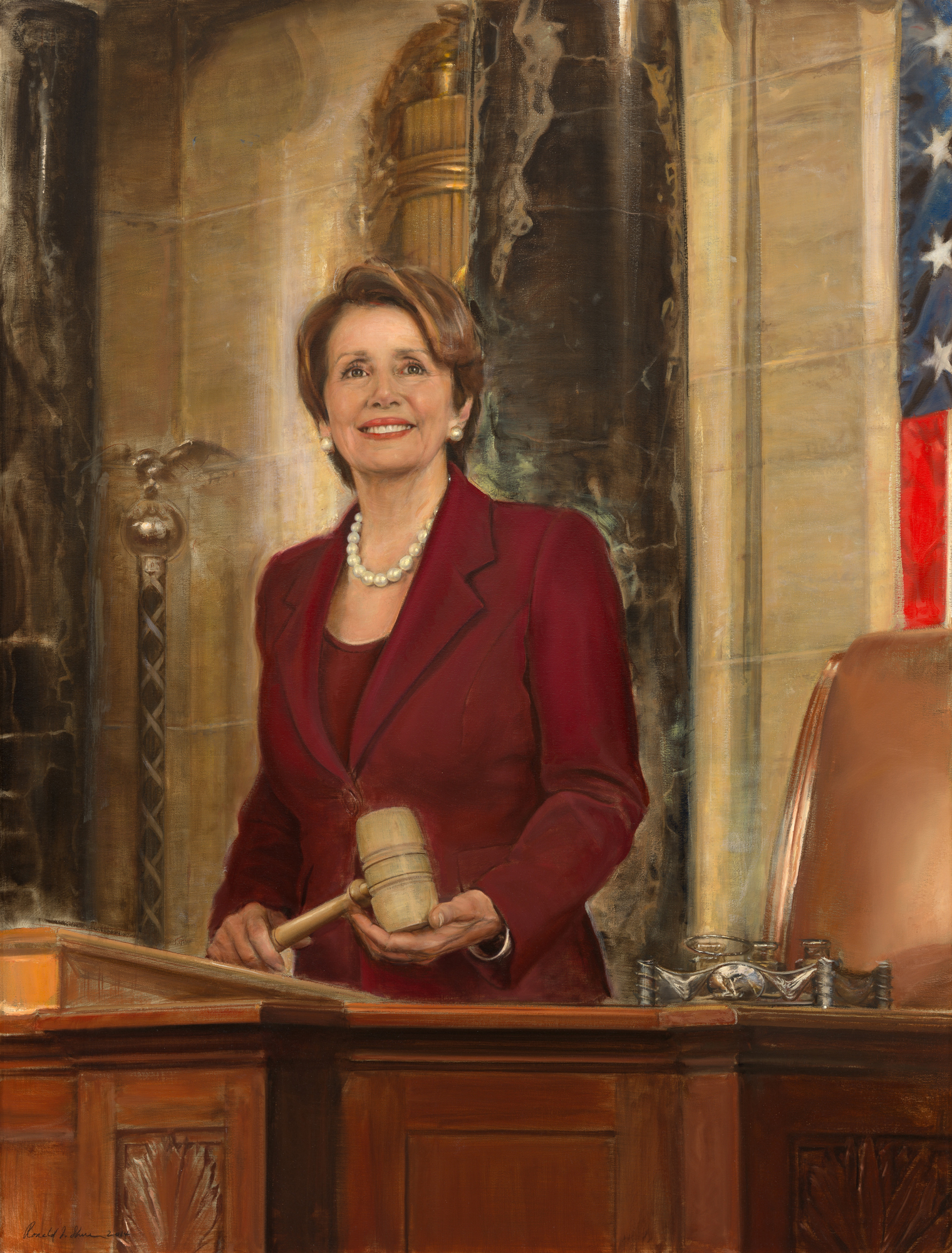
Nancy Pelosi (D)

- Speaker: Nancy Pelosi (D)

==== Majority (Democratic) leadership ====
- Majority Leader: Steny Hoyer
- Majority Whip: Jim Clyburn
- Senior Chief Deputy Majority Whip: John Lewis
- Chief Deputy Majority Whips: Maxine Waters, John S. Tanner, Ed Pastor, Jan Schakowsky, Joseph Crowley, Diana DeGette, G. K. Butterfield, Debbie Wasserman Schultz
- Democratic Caucus Chairman: John B. Larson
- Democratic Caucus Vice-Chairman: Xavier Becerra
- Democratic Campaign Committee Chairman: Chris Van Hollen
- Steering/Policy Committee Co-Chairs: George Miller and Rosa DeLauro
- Organization, Study, and Review Chairman: Michael Capuano

==== Minority (Republican) leadership ====
- Minority Leader: John Boehner
- Minority Whip: Eric Cantor
- Chief Deputy Whip: Kevin McCarthy
- Republican Conference Chairman: Mike Pence
- Republican Conference Vice-Chairman: Cathy McMorris-Rodgers
- Republican Conference Secretary: John Carter
- Policy Committee Chairman: Thaddeus McCotter
- Republican Campaign Committee Chairman: Pete Sessions
- Ranking Member of the House Rules Committee: David Dreier

== Members ==
- Skip to House of Representatives, below

=== Senate ===
In this Congress, Class 3 meant their term ended with this Congress, requiring reelection in 2010; Class 1 meant their term began in the last Congress, requiring reelection in 2012; and Class 2 meant their term began in this Congress, requiring reelection in 2014.

==== Alabama ====
▌2. Jeff Sessions (R)
▌3. Richard Shelby (R)

==== Alaska ====
▌2. Mark Begich (D)
▌3. Lisa Murkowski (R)

==== Arizona ====
▌1. Jon Kyl (R)
▌3. John McCain (R)

==== Arkansas ====
▌2. Mark Pryor (D)
▌3. Blanche Lincoln (D)

==== California ====
▌1. Dianne Feinstein (D)
▌3. Barbara Boxer (D)

==== Colorado ====
▌2. Mark Udall (D)
▌3. Ken Salazar (D), until January 20, 2009

▌Michael Bennet (D), from January 21, 2009

==== Connecticut ====
▌1. Joe Lieberman (ID)
▌3. Chris Dodd (D)

==== Delaware ====
▌1. Tom Carper (D)
▌2. Joe Biden (D), until January 15, 2009

▌Ted Kaufman (D), January 16, 2009 – November 15, 2010
▌Chris Coons (D), from November 15, 2010

==== Florida ====
▌1. Bill Nelson (D)
▌3. Mel Martinez (R), until September 9, 2009

▌George LeMieux (R), from September 10, 2009

==== Georgia ====
▌2. Saxby Chambliss (R)
▌3. Johnny Isakson (R)

==== Hawaii ====
▌1. Daniel Akaka (D)
▌3. Daniel Inouye (D)

==== Idaho ====
▌2. Jim Risch (R)
▌3. Mike Crapo (R)

==== Illinois ====
▌2. Dick Durbin (D)
▌3. Roland Burris (D), January 12, 2009 – November 29, 2010

▌Mark Kirk (R), from November 29, 2010

==== Indiana ====
▌1. Richard Lugar (R)
▌3. Evan Bayh (D)

==== Iowa ====
▌2. Tom Harkin (D)
▌3. Chuck Grassley (R)

==== Kansas ====
▌2. Pat Roberts (R)
▌3. Sam Brownback (R)

==== Kentucky ====
▌2. Mitch McConnell (R)
▌3. Jim Bunning (R)

==== Louisiana ====
▌2. Mary Landrieu (D)
▌3. David Vitter (R)

==== Maine ====
▌1. Olympia Snowe (R)
▌2. Susan Collins (R)

==== Maryland ====
▌1. Ben Cardin (D)
▌3. Barbara Mikulski (D)

==== Massachusetts ====
▌1. Ted Kennedy (D), until August 25, 2009

▌Paul G. Kirk (D), September 24, 2009 – February 4, 2010
▌Scott Brown (R), from February 4, 2010

▌2. John Kerry (D)

==== Michigan ====
▌1. Debbie Stabenow (D)
▌2. Carl Levin (D)

==== Minnesota ====
▌1. Amy Klobuchar (DFL) (Note: The Minnesota Democratic–Farmer–Labor Party (DFL) and the North Dakota Democratic-Nonpartisan League Party (D-NPL) are the Minnesota and North Dakota affiliates of the U.S. Democratic Party and are counted as Democrats.)
▌2. Al Franken (DFL),from July 7, 2009

==== Mississippi ====
▌1. Roger Wicker (R)
▌2. Thad Cochran (R)

==== Missouri ====
▌1. Claire McCaskill (D)
▌3. Kit Bond (R)

==== Montana ====
▌1. Jon Tester (D)
▌2. Max Baucus (D)

==== Nebraska ====
▌1. Ben Nelson (D)
▌2. Mike Johanns (R)

==== Nevada ====
▌1. John Ensign (R)
▌3. Harry Reid (D)

==== New Hampshire ====
▌2. Jeanne Shaheen (D)
▌3. Judd Gregg (R)

==== New Jersey ====
▌1. Bob Menendez (D)
▌2. Frank Lautenberg (D)

==== New Mexico ====
▌1. Jeff Bingaman (D)
▌2. Tom Udall (D)

==== New York ====
▌1. Hillary Clinton (D), until January 21, 2009

▌Kirsten Gillibrand (D), from January 26, 2009

▌3. Chuck Schumer (D)

==== North Carolina ====
▌2. Kay Hagan (D)
▌3. Richard Burr (R)

==== North Dakota ====
▌1. Kent Conrad (D-NPL)
▌3. Byron Dorgan (D-NPL)

==== Ohio ====
▌1. Sherrod Brown (D)
▌3. George Voinovich (R)

==== Oklahoma ====
▌2. Jim Inhofe (R)
▌3. Tom Coburn (R)

==== Oregon ====
▌2. Jeff Merkley (D)
▌3. Ron Wyden (D)

==== Pennsylvania ====
▌1. Bob Casey Jr. (D)
▌▌3. Arlen Specter (R) until April 29, 2009, then (D)

==== Rhode Island ====
▌1. Sheldon Whitehouse (D)
▌2. Jack Reed (D)

==== South Carolina ====
▌2. Lindsey Graham (R)
▌3. Jim DeMint (R)

==== South Dakota ====
▌2. Tim P. Johnson (D)
▌3. John Thune (R)

==== Tennessee ====
▌1. Bob Corker (R)
▌2. Lamar Alexander (R)

==== Texas ====
▌1. Kay Bailey Hutchison (R)
▌2. John Cornyn (R)

==== Utah ====
▌1. Orrin Hatch (R)
▌3. Bob Bennett (R)

==== Vermont ====
▌1. Bernie Sanders (I)
▌3. Patrick Leahy (D)

==== Virginia ====
▌1. Jim Webb (D)
▌2. Mark Warner (D)

==== Washington ====
▌1. Maria Cantwell (D)
▌3. Patty Murray (D)

==== West Virginia ====
▌1. Robert Byrd (D), until June 28, 2010

▌Carte Goodwin (D), July 16, 2010 – November 15, 2010
▌Joe Manchin (D), from November 15, 2010

▌2. Jay Rockefeller (D)

==== Wisconsin ====
▌1. Herb Kohl (D)
▌3. Russ Feingold (D)

==== Wyoming ====
▌1. John Barrasso (R)
▌2. Mike Enzi (R)

Senators' party membership by state for most of 2010 2 Democrats 1 Democrat and 1 Republican 2 Republicans 1 Independent and 1 Democrat

Senate Majority Leaders

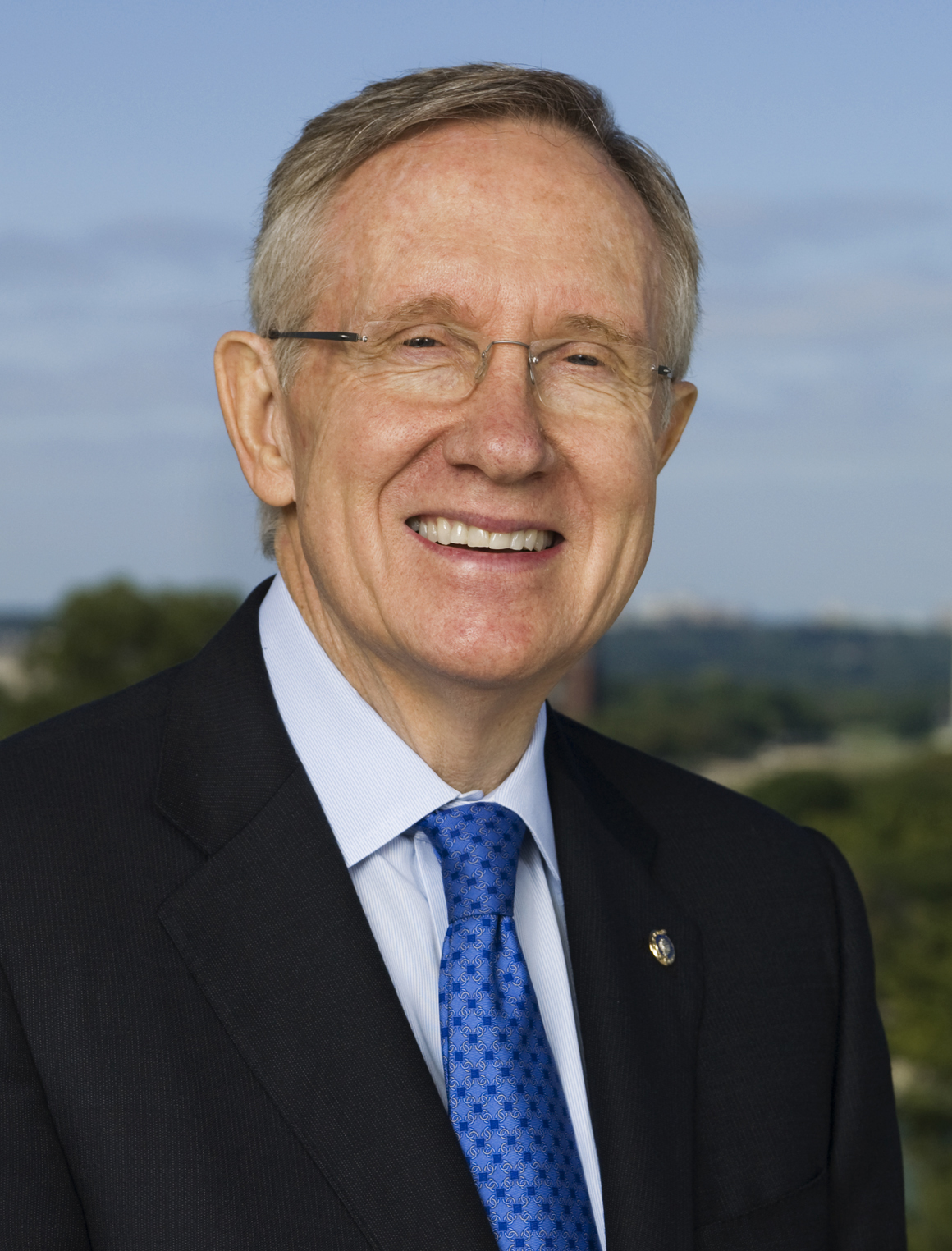
Democratic Leader
Harry Reid

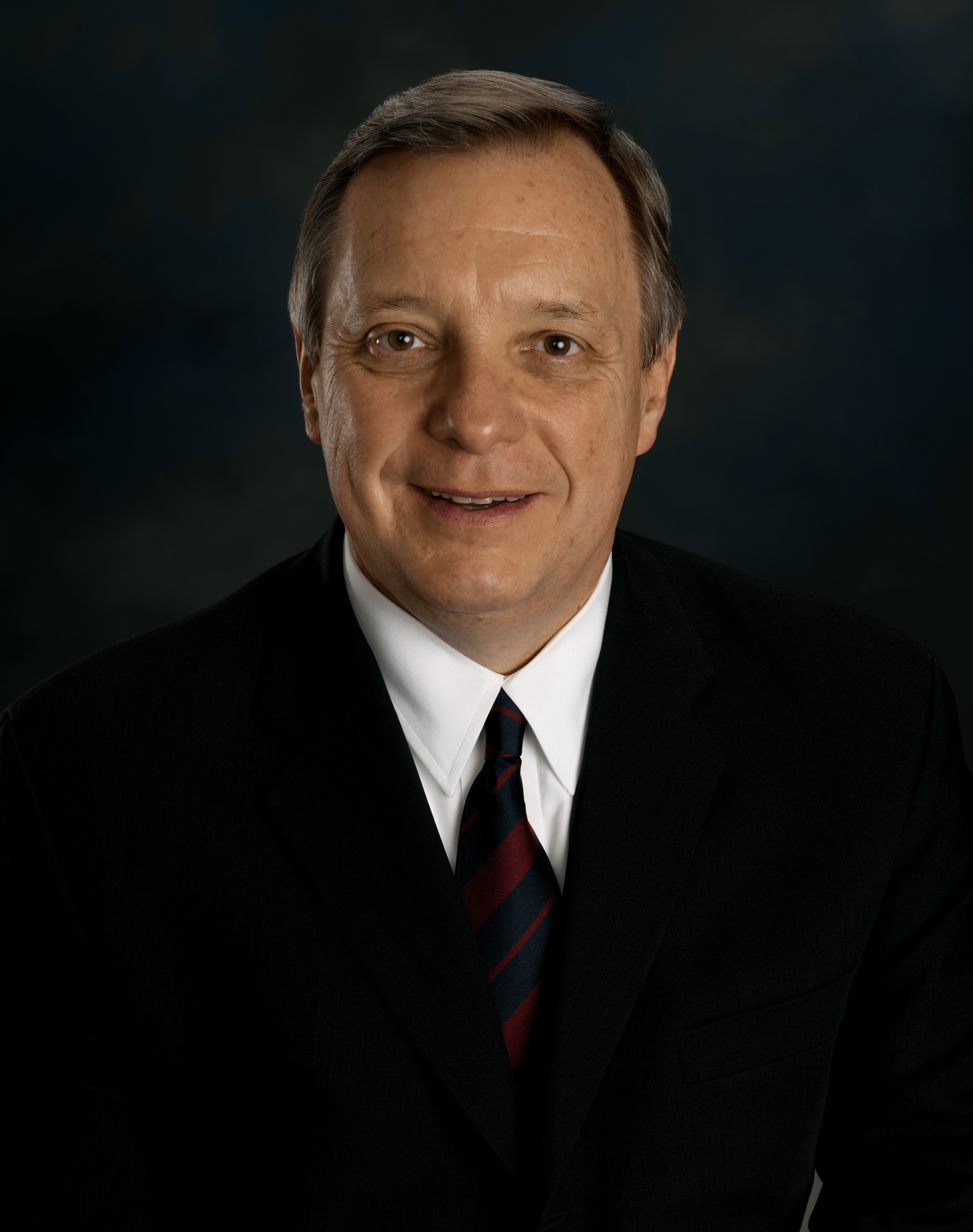
Democratic Whip
Dick Durbin

Senate Minority Leaders

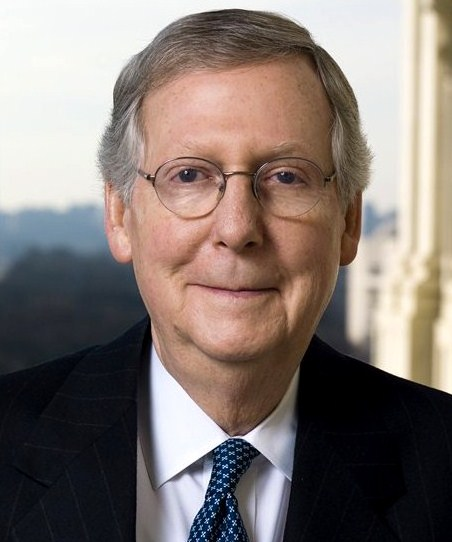
Republican Leader
Mitch McConnell

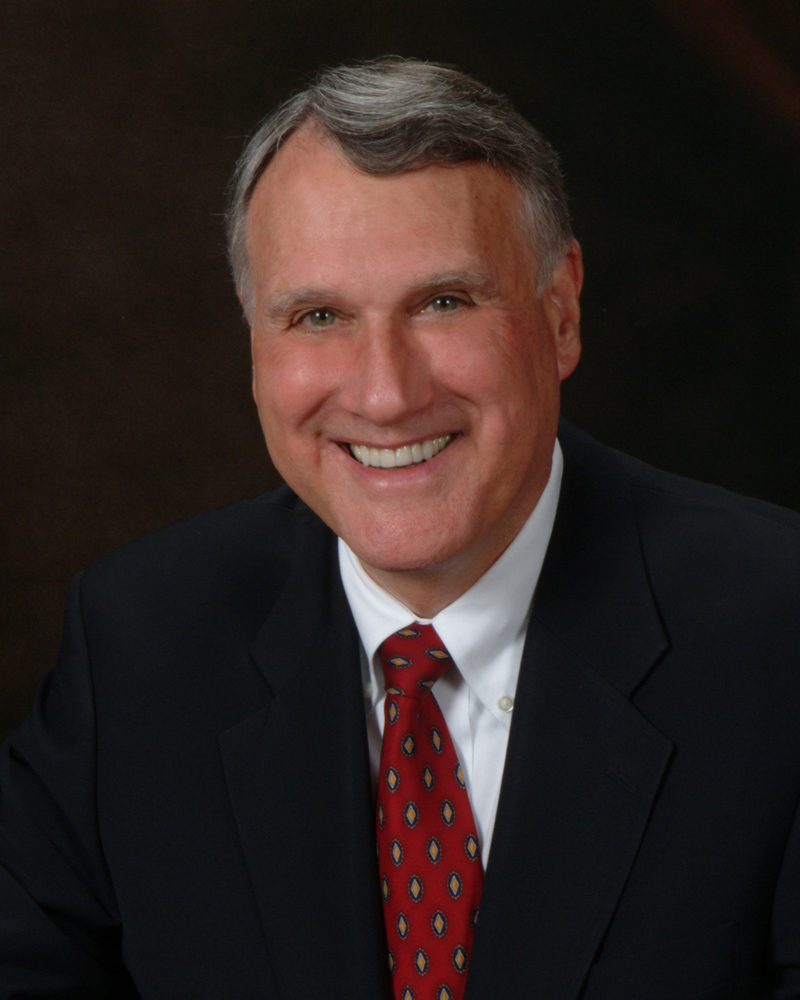
Republican Whip
Jon Kyl

=== House of Representatives ===
==== Alabama ====
▌1. Jo Bonner (R)
▌2. Bobby Bright (D)
▌3. Mike Rogers (R)
▌4. Robert Aderholt (R)
▌▌5. Parker Griffith (D, then R)
▌6. Spencer Bachus (R)
▌7. Artur Davis (D)

==== Alaska ====
▌At-large. Don Young (R)

==== Arizona ====
▌1. Ann Kirkpatrick (D)
▌2. Trent Franks (R)
▌3. John Shadegg (R)
▌4. Ed Pastor (D)
▌5. Harry Mitchell (D)
▌6. Jeff Flake (R)
▌7. Raúl Grijalva (D)
▌8. Gabby Giffords (D)

==== Arkansas ====
▌1. Marion Berry (D)
▌2. Vic Snyder (D)
▌3. John Boozman (R)
▌4. Mike Ross (D)

==== California ====
▌1. Mike Thompson (D)
▌2. Wally Herger (R)
▌3. Dan Lungren (R)
▌4. Tom McClintock (R)
▌5. Doris Matsui (D)
▌6. Lynn Woolsey (D)
▌7. George Miller (D)
▌8. Nancy Pelosi (D)
▌9. Barbara Lee (D)
▌10. Ellen Tauscher (D), until June 26, 2009

▌John Garamendi (D), from November 3, 2009

▌11. Jerry McNerney (D)
▌12. Jackie Speier (D)
▌13. Pete Stark (D)
▌14. Anna Eshoo (D)
▌15. Mike Honda (D)
▌16. Zoe Lofgren (D)
▌17. Sam Farr (D)
▌18. Dennis Cardoza (D)
▌19. George Radanovich (R)
▌20. Jim Costa (D)
▌21. Devin Nunes (R)
▌22. Kevin McCarthy (R)
▌23. Lois Capps (D)
▌24. Elton Gallegly (R)
▌25. Howard McKeon (R)
▌26. David Dreier (R)
▌27. Brad Sherman (D)
▌28. Howard Berman (D)
▌29. Adam Schiff (D)
▌30. Henry Waxman (D)
▌31. Xavier Becerra (D)
▌32. Hilda Solis (D), until February 24, 2009

▌Judy Chu (D), from July 14, 2009

▌33. Diane Watson (D)
▌34. Lucille Roybal-Allard (D)
▌35. Maxine Waters (D)
▌36. Jane Harman (D)
▌37. Laura Richardson (D)
▌38. Grace Napolitano (D)
▌39. Linda Sanchez (D)
▌40. Ed Royce (R)
▌41. Jerry Lewis (R)
▌42. Gary Miller (R)
▌43. Joe Baca (D)
▌44. Ken Calvert (R)
▌45. Mary Bono Mack (R)
▌46. Dana Rohrabacher (R)
▌47. Loretta Sanchez (D)
▌48. John Campbell (R)
▌49. Darrell Issa (R)
▌50. Brian Bilbray (R)
▌51. Bob Filner (D)
▌52. Duncan Hunter (R)
▌53. Susan Davis (D)

==== Colorado ====
▌1. Diana DeGette (D)
▌2. Jared Polis (D)
▌3. John Salazar (D)
▌4. Betsy Markey (D)
▌5. Doug Lamborn (R)
▌6. Mike Coffman (R)
▌7. Ed Perlmutter (D)

==== Connecticut ====
▌1. John Larson (D)
▌2. Joe Courtney (D)
▌3. Rosa DeLauro (D)
▌4. Jim Himes (D)
▌5. Chris Murphy (D)

==== Delaware ====
▌At-large. Mike Castle (R)

==== Florida ====
▌1. Jeff Miller (R)
▌2. Allen Boyd (D)
▌3. Corrine Brown (D)
▌4. Ander Crenshaw (R)
▌5. Ginny Brown-Waite (R)
▌6. Cliff Stearns (R)
▌7. John Mica (R)
▌8. Alan Grayson (D)
▌9. Gus Bilirakis (R)
▌10. Bill Young (R)
▌11. Kathy Castor (D)
▌12. Adam Putnam (R)
▌13. Vern Buchanan (R)
▌14. Connie Mack (R)
▌15. Bill Posey (R)
▌16. Tom Rooney (R)
▌17. Kendrick Meek (D)
▌18. Ileana Ros-Lehtinen (R)
▌19. Robert Wexler (D), until January 3, 2010

▌Ted Deutch (D), from April 13, 2010

▌20. Debbie Wasserman Schultz (D)
▌21. Lincoln Diaz-Balart (R)
▌22. Ron Klein (D)
▌23. Alcee Hastings (D)
▌24. Suzanne Kosmas (D)
▌25. Mario Diaz-Balart (R)

==== Georgia ====
▌1. Jack Kingston (R)
▌2. Sanford Bishop (D)
▌3. Lynn Westmoreland (R)
▌4. Hank Johnson (D)
▌5. John Lewis (D)
▌6. Tom Price (R)
▌7. John Linder (R)
▌8. Jim Marshall (D)
▌9. Nathan Deal (R), until March 21, 2010

▌Tom Graves (R), from June 8, 2010

▌10. Paul Broun (R)
▌11. Phil Gingrey (R)
▌12. John Barrow (D)
▌13. David Scott (D)

==== Hawaii ====
▌1. Neil Abercrombie (D), until February 28, 2010

▌Charles Djou (R), from May 22, 2010

▌2. Mazie Hirono (D)

==== Idaho ====
▌1. Walt Minnick (D)
▌2. Mike Simpson (R)

==== Illinois ====
▌1. Bobby Rush (D)
▌2. Jesse Jackson (D)
▌3. Dan Lipinski (D)
▌4. Luis Gutiérrez (D)
▌5. Mike Quigley (D), from April 7, 2009
▌6. Peter Roskam (R)
▌7. Danny Davis (D)
▌8. Melissa Bean (D)
▌9. Jan Schakowsky (D)
▌10. Mark Kirk (R), until November 29, 2010

vacant

▌11. Debbie Halvorson (D)
▌12. Jerry Costello (D)
▌13. Judy Biggert (R)
▌14. Bill Foster (D)
▌15. Tim V. Johnson (R)
▌16. Donald Manzullo (R)
▌17. Phil Hare (D)
▌18. Aaron Schock (R)
▌19. John Shimkus (R)

==== Indiana ====
▌1. Pete Visclosky (D)
▌2. Joe Donnelly (D)
▌3. Mark Souder (R), until May 21, 2010

▌Marlin Stutzman (R), from November 2, 2010

▌4. Steve Buyer (R)
▌5. Dan Burton (R)
▌6. Mike Pence (R)
▌7. Andre Carson (D)
▌8. Brad Ellsworth (D)
▌9. Baron Hill (D)

==== Iowa ====
▌1. Bruce Braley (D)
▌2. David Loebsack (D)
▌3. Leonard Boswell (D)
▌4. Tom Latham (R)
▌5. Steve King (R)

==== Kansas ====
▌1. Jerry Moran (R)
▌2. Lynn Jenkins (R)
▌3. Dennis Moore (D)
▌4. Todd Tiahrt (R)

==== Kentucky ====
▌1. Ed Whitfield (R)
▌2. Brett Guthrie (R)
▌3. John Yarmuth (D)
▌4. Geoff Davis (R)
▌5. Harold Rogers (R)
▌6. Ben Chandler (D)

==== Louisiana ====
▌1. Steve Scalise (R)
▌2. Joseph Cao (R)
▌3. Charlie Melancon (D)
▌4. John Fleming (R)
▌5. Rodney Alexander (R)
▌6. Bill Cassidy (R)
▌7. Charles Boustany (R)

==== Maine ====
▌1. Chellie Pingree (D)
▌2. Mike Michaud (D)

==== Maryland ====
▌1. Frank Kratovil (D)
▌2. Dutch Ruppersberger (D)
▌3. John Sarbanes (D)
▌4. Donna Edwards (D)
▌5. Steny Hoyer (D)
▌6. Roscoe Bartlett (R)
▌7. Elijah Cummings (D)
▌8. Chris Van Hollen (D)

==== Massachusetts ====
▌1. John Olver (D)
▌2. Richard Neal (D)
▌3. Jim McGovern (D)
▌4. Barney Frank (D)
▌5. Niki Tsongas (D)
▌6. John Tierney (D)
▌7. Ed Markey (D)
▌8. Mike Capuano (D)
▌9. Stephen Lynch (D)
▌10. Bill Delahunt (D)

==== Michigan ====
▌1. Bart Stupak (D)
▌2. Peter Hoekstra (R)
▌3. Vern Ehlers (R)
▌4. David Camp (R)
▌5. Dale Kildee (D)
▌6. Fred Upton (R)
▌7. Mark Schauer (D)
▌8. Mike Rogers (R)
▌9. Gary Peters (D)
▌10. Candice Miller (R)
▌11. Thaddeus McCotter (R)
▌12. Sander Levin (D)
▌13. Carolyn Cheeks (D)
▌14. John Conyers (D)
▌15. John Dingell (D)

==== Minnesota ====
▌1. Tim Walz (DFL)
▌2. John Kline (R)
▌3. Erik Paulsen (R)
▌4. Betty McCollum (DFL)
▌5. Keith Ellison (DFL)
▌6. Michele Bachmann (R)
▌7. Collin Peterson (DFL)
▌8. Jim Oberstar (DFL)

==== Mississippi ====
▌1. Travis Childers (D)
▌2. Bennie Thompson (D)
▌3. Gregg Harper (R)
▌4. Gene Taylor (D)

==== Missouri ====
▌1. Lacy Clay (D)
▌2. Todd Akin (R)
▌3. Russ Carnahan (D)
▌4. Ike Skelton (D)
▌5. Emanuel Cleaver (D)
▌6. Sam Graves (R)
▌7. Roy Blunt (R)
▌8. Jo Ann Emerson (R)
▌9. Blaine Luetkemeyer (R)

==== Montana ====
▌At-large. Denny Rehberg (R)

==== Nebraska ====
▌1. Jeff Fortenberry (R)
▌2. Lee Terry (R)
▌3. Adrian Smith (R)

==== Nevada ====
▌1. Shelley Berkley (D)
▌2. Dean Heller (R)
▌3. Dina Titus (D)

==== New Hampshire ====
▌1. Carol Shea-Porter (D)
▌2. Paul Hodes (D)

==== New Jersey ====
▌1. Rob Andrews (D)
▌2. Frank LoBiondo (R)
▌3. John Adler (D)
▌4. Chris Smith (R)
▌5. Scott Garrett (R)
▌6. Frank Pallone (D)
▌7. Leonard Lance (R)
▌8. Bill Pascrell (D)
▌9. Steve Rothman (D)
▌10. Donald Payne (D)
▌11. Rodney Frelinghuysen (R)
▌12. Rush Holt (D)
▌13. Albio Sires (D)

==== New Mexico ====
▌1. Martin Heinrich (D)
▌2. Harry Teague (D)
▌3. Ben Lujan (D)

==== New York ====
▌1. Tim Bishop (D)
▌2. Steve Israel (D)
▌3. Peter King (R)
▌4. Carolyn McCarthy (D)
▌5. Gary Ackerman (D)
▌6. Gregory Meeks (D)
▌7. Joseph Crowley (D)
▌8. Jerry Nadler (D)
▌9. Anthony Weiner (D)
▌10. Edolphus Towns (D)
▌11. Yvette Clarke (D)
▌12. Nydia Velázquez (D)
▌13. Michael McMahon (D)
▌14. Carolyn Maloney (D)
▌15. Charles Rangel (D)
▌16. Jose Serrano (D)
▌17. Eliot Engel (D)
▌18. Nita Lowey (D)
▌19. John Hall (D)
▌20. Kirsten Gillibrand (D), until January 26, 2009

▌Scott Murphy (D), from April 29, 2009

▌21. Paul Tonko (D)
▌22. Maurice Hinchey (D)
▌23. John McHugh (R), until September 21, 2009

▌Bill Owens (D), from November 6, 2009

▌24. Mike Arcuri (D)
▌25. Dan Maffei (D)
▌26. Chris Lee (R)
▌27. Brian Higgins (D)
▌28. Louise Slaughter (D)
▌29. Eric Massa (D), until March 8, 2010

▌Tom Reed (R), from November 2, 2010

==== North Carolina ====
▌1. G. K. Butterfield (D)
▌2. Bob Etheridge (D)
▌3. Walter Jones (R)
▌4. David Price (D)
▌5. Virginia Foxx (R)
▌6. Howard Coble (R)
▌7. Mike McIntyre (D)
▌8. Larry Kissell (D)
▌9. Sue Myrick (R)
▌10. Patrick McHenry (R)
▌11. Heath Shuler (D)
▌12. Mel Watt (D)
▌13. Brad Miller (D)

==== North Dakota ====
▌At-large. Earl Pomeroy (D-NPL)

==== Ohio ====
▌1. Steve Driehaus (D)
▌2. Jean Schmidt (R)
▌3. Mike Turner (R)
▌4. Jim Jordan (R)
▌5. Bob Latta (R)
▌6. Charlie Wilson (D)
▌7. Steve Austria (R)
▌8. John Boehner (R)
▌9. Marcy Kaptur (D)
▌10. Dennis Kucinich (D)
▌11. Marcia Fudge (D)
▌12. Pat Tiberi (R)
▌13. Betty Sutton (D)
▌14. Steve LaTourette (R)
▌15. Mary Kilroy (D)
▌16. John Boccieri (D)
▌17. Tim Ryan (D)
▌18. Zack Space (D)

==== Oklahoma ====
▌1. John Sullivan (R)
▌2. Dan Boren (D)
▌3. Frank Lucas (R)
▌4. Tom Cole (R)
▌5. Mary Fallin (R)

==== Oregon ====
▌1. David Wu (D)
▌2. Greg Walden (R)
▌3. Earl Blumenauer (D)
▌4. Peter DeFazio (D)
▌5. Kurt Schrader (D)

==== Pennsylvania ====
▌1. Bob Brady (D)
▌2. Chaka Fattah (D)
▌3. Kathy Dahlkemper (D)
▌4. Jason Altmire (D)
▌5. Glenn Thompson (R)
▌6. Jim Gerlach (R)
▌7. Joe Sestak (D)
▌8. Patrick Murphy (D)
▌9. Bill Shuster (R)
▌10. Chris Carney (D)
▌11. Paul Kanjorski (D)
▌12. John Murtha (D), until February 8, 2010

▌Mark Critz (D), from May 18, 2010

▌13. Allyson Schwartz (D)
▌14. Michael Doyle (D)
▌15. Charlie Dent (R)
▌16. Joseph Pitts (R)
▌17. Tim Holden (D)
▌18. Tim Murphy (R)
▌19. Todd Platts (R)

==== Rhode Island ====
▌1. Patrick Kennedy (D)
▌2. James Langevin (D)

==== South Carolina ====
▌1. Henry E. Brown (R)
▌2. Joe Wilson (R)
▌3. Gresham Barrett (R)
▌4. Bob Inglis (R)
▌5. John Spratt (D)
▌6. Jim Clyburn (D)

==== South Dakota ====
▌At-large. Stephanie Herseth Sandlin (D)

==== Tennessee ====
▌1. Phil Roe (R)
▌2. Jimmy Duncan (R)
▌3. Zach Wamp (R)
▌4. Lincoln Davis (D)
▌5. Jim Cooper (D)
▌6. Bart Gordon (D)
▌7. Marsha Blackburn (R)
▌8. John Tanner (D)
▌9. Steve Cohen (D)

==== Texas ====
▌1. Louie Gohmert (R)
▌2. Ted Poe (R)
▌3. Sam Johnson (R)
▌4. Ralph Hall (R)
▌5. Jeb Hensarling (R)
▌6. Joe Barton (R)
▌7. John Culberson (R)
▌8. Kevin Brady (R)
▌9. Al Green (D)
▌10. Michael McCaul (R)
▌11. Mike Conaway (R)
▌12. Kay Granger (R)
▌13. Mac Thornberry (R)
▌14. Ron Paul (R)
▌15. Ruben Hinojosa (D)
▌16. Silvestre Reyes (D)
▌17. Chet Edwards (D)
▌18. Sheila Jackson Lee (D)
▌19. Randy Neugebauer (R)
▌20. Charlie Gonzalez (D)
▌21. Lamar Smith (R)
▌22. Pete Olson (R)
▌23. Ciro Rodriguez (D)
▌24. Kenny Marchant (R)
▌25. Lloyd Doggett (D)
▌26. Michael Burgess (R)
▌27. Solomon Ortiz (D)
▌28. Henry Cuellar (D)
▌29. Gene Green (D)
▌30. Bernice Johnson (D)
▌31. John Carter (R)
▌32. Pete Sessions (R)

==== Utah ====
▌1. Rob Bishop (R)
▌2. Jim Matheson (D)
▌3. Jason Chaffetz (R)

==== Vermont ====
▌At-large. Peter Welch (D)

==== Virginia ====
▌1. Rob Wittman (R)
▌2. Glenn Nye (D)
▌3. Bobby Scott (D)
▌4. Randy Forbes (R)
▌5. Tom Perriello (D)
▌6. Bob Goodlatte (R)
▌7. Eric Cantor (R)
▌8. Jim Moran (D)
▌9. Rick Boucher (D)
▌10. Frank Wolf (R)
▌11. Gerry Connolly (D)

==== Washington ====
▌1. Jay Inslee (D)
▌2. Rick Larsen (D)
▌3. Brian Baird (D)
▌4. Doc Hastings (R)
▌5. Cathy Rodgers (R)
▌6. Norm Dicks (D)
▌7. Jim McDermott (D)
▌8. Dave Reichert (R)
▌9. Adam Smith (D)

==== West Virginia ====
▌1. Alan Mollohan (D)
▌2. Shelley Moore Capito (R)
▌3. Nick Rahall (D)

==== Wisconsin ====
▌1. Paul Ryan (R)
▌2. Tammy Baldwin (D)
▌3. Ron Kind (D)
▌4. Gwen Moore (D)
▌5. Jim Sensenbrenner (R)
▌6. Tom Petri (R)
▌7. Dave Obey (D)
▌8. Steve Kagen (D)

==== Wyoming ====
▌At-large. Cynthia Lummis (R)

==== Non-voting delegates ====
▌American Samoa. Eni Faleomavaega (D)
▌District of Columbia. Eleanor Holmes Norton (D)
▌Guam. Madeleine Bordallo (D)
▌▌Northern Mariana Islands. Gregorio C. Sablan (I, then D)
▌ Puerto Rico. Pedro Pierluisi (Resident Commissioner) (D/NPP)
▌Virgin Islands. Donna Christian-Christensen (D)

Percentage of members from each party by state, at the opening of the 111th Congress in January 2009, ranging from dark blue (most Democratic) to dark red (most Republican).

Members' party membership by district, as of May 25, 2010 Democratic Republican

House majority leadership

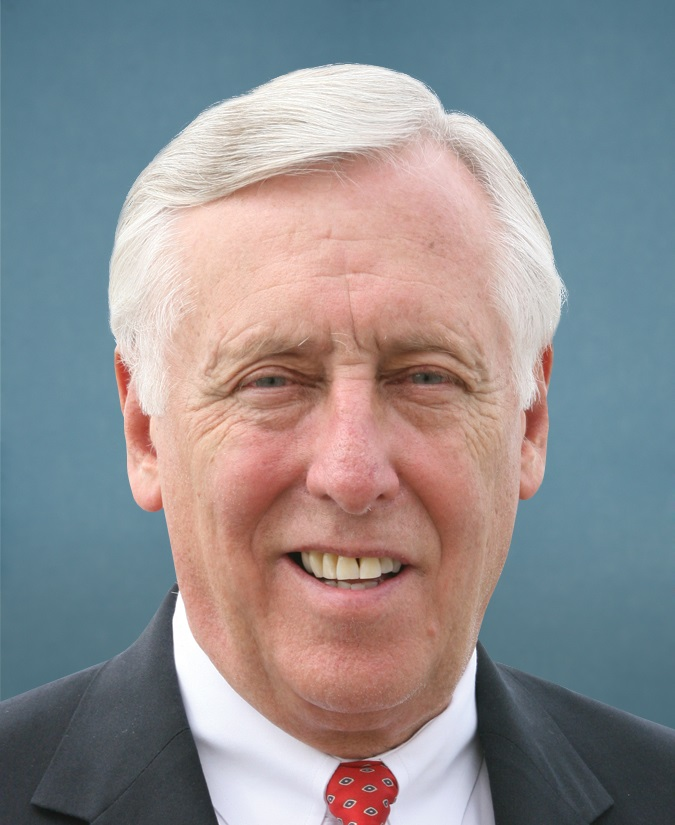
Democratic leader
Steny Hoyer

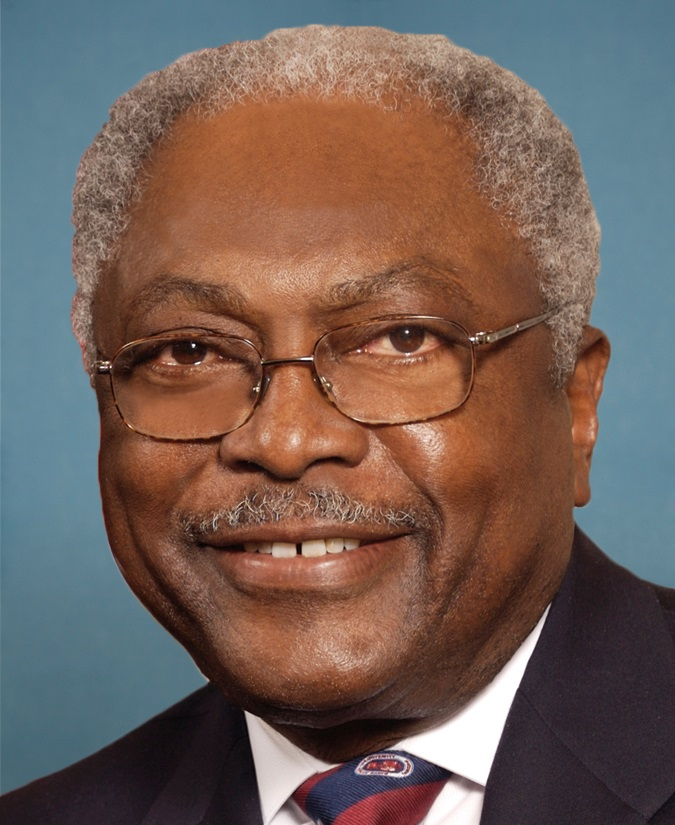
Democratic whip
Jim Clyburn

House minority leadership

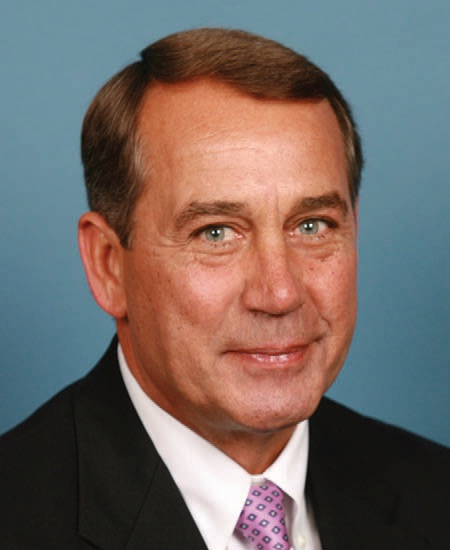
Republican leader
John Boehner

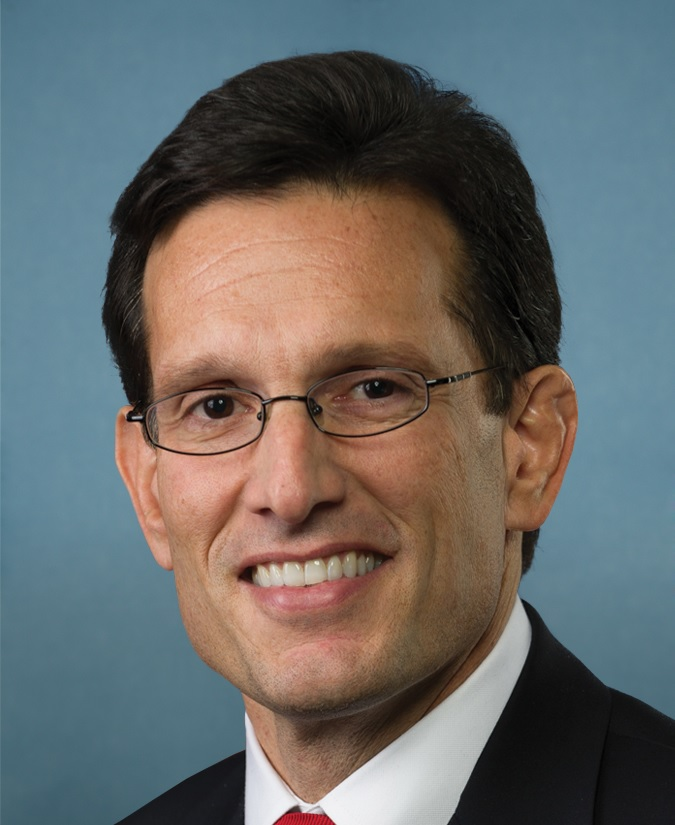
Republican whip
Eric Cantor

== Changes in membership ==
=== Senate ===
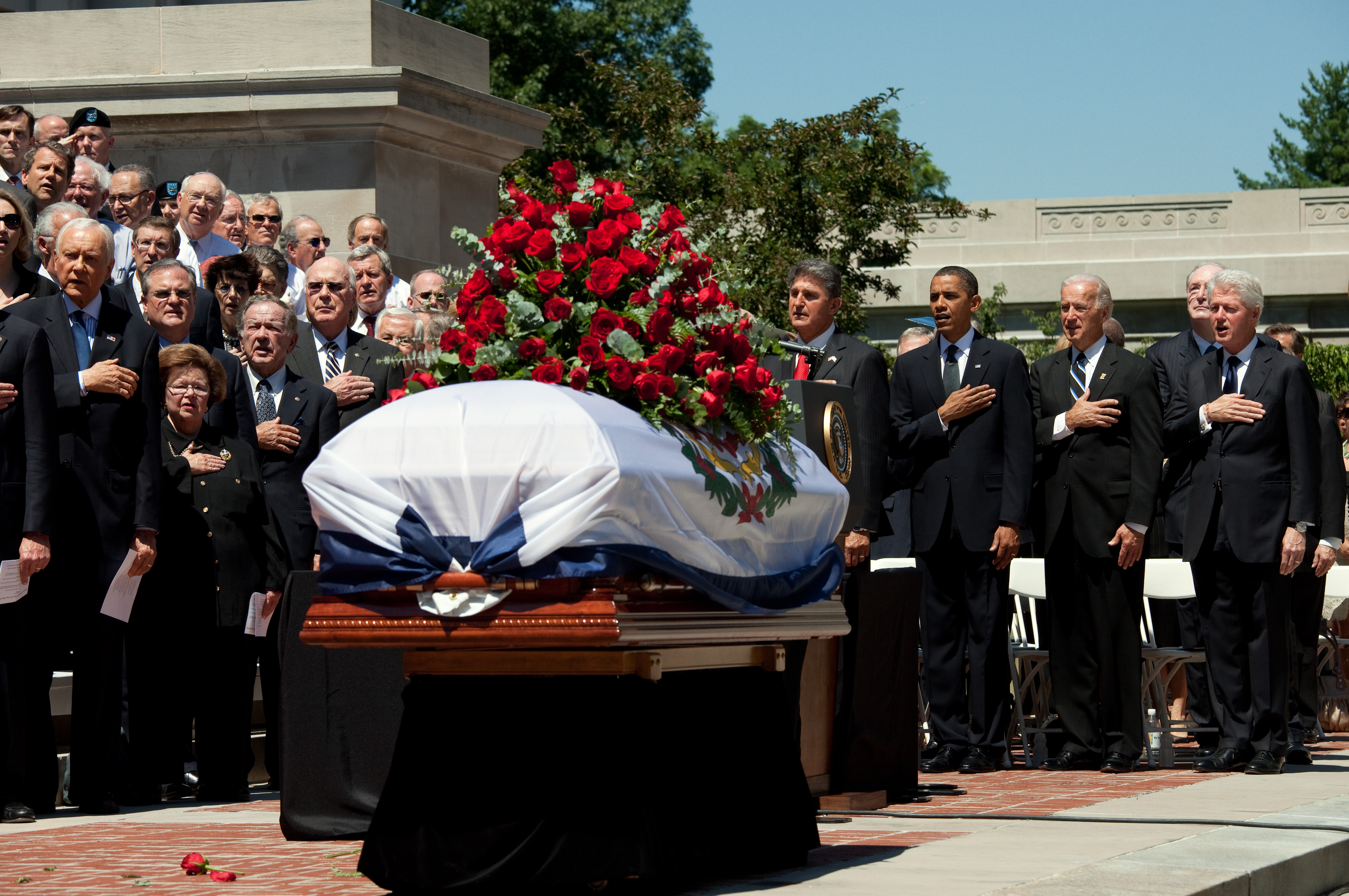
Funeral service for Senator Robert Byrd, who died June 28, 2010. He was the longest-serving senator.

Four of the changes are associated with the 2008 presidential election and appointments to the Obama Administration, one senator changed parties, one election was disputed, two senators died, one senator resigned, and three appointed senators served only until special elections were held during this Congress.

Senate changes
State (class)	Vacated by	Reason for change	Successor	Date of successor's formal installation (Note: When seated or oath administered, not necessarily when service began.)
Minnesota (2)	Disputed	Norm Coleman (R) expired his term on January 3, 2009, following a challenged election of Al Franken (D). The results were disputed, and the seat remained vacant at the beginning of the Congress. Following recounts and litigation, successor elected June 30, 2009.	Al Franken (DFL)	July 7, 2009
Illinois (3)	Vacant	Barack Obama (D) resigned near the end of the previous Congress, after being elected President of the United States. Successor was appointed December 31, 2008, during the last Congress, but due to a credentials challenge, his credentials were not deemed "in order" until January 12, and he was not sworn in to fill his seat until 12 days after the initiation of this Congress.	Roland Burris (D)	January 12, 2009
Delaware (2)	Joe Biden (D)	Resigned January 15, 2009, to assume the position of Vice President. Successor was appointed January 15, 2009, to continue the term.	Ted Kaufman (D)	January 16, 2009
Colorado (3)	Ken Salazar (D)	Resigned January 20, 2009, to become Secretary of the Interior. Successor was appointed on January 21, 2009, to continue the term. Appointee was later elected to a full six-year term.	Michael Bennet (D)	January 21, 2009
New York (1)	Hillary Clinton (D)	Resigned January 21, 2009, to become Secretary of State. Successor was appointed on January 26, 2009, to continue the term. Appointee was later elected November 2, 2010, to finish the term ending January 3, 2013.	Kirsten Gillibrand (D)	January 26, 2009
Pennsylvania (3)	Arlen Specter (R)	Changed party affiliation April 30, 2009.	Arlen Specter (D)	April 30, 2009
Massachusetts (1)	Ted Kennedy (D)	Died August 25, 2009. Successor was appointed September 23, 2009, to finish the term.	Paul G. Kirk (D)	September 25, 2009
Florida (3)	Mel Martinez (R)	Resigned September 9, 2009 after declined to run for the upcoming senate election for personal reasons. Successor was appointed to finish the term.	George LeMieux (R)	September 10, 2009
Massachusetts (1)	Paul G. Kirk (D)	Appointee resigned February 4, 2010. Successor elected January 19, 2010, to finish the term ending January 3, 2013.	Scott Brown (R)	February 4, 2010
West Virginia (1)	Robert Byrd (D)	Died June 28, 2010. Successor was appointed July 16, 2010, to finish the term.	Carte Goodwin (D)	July 16, 2010
Delaware (2)	Ted Kaufman (D)	Appointee resigned in which he was not a candidate. Successor elected November 2, 2010, to finish the term ending January 3, 2015.	Chris Coons (D)	November 15, 2010
West Virginia (1)	Carte Goodwin (D)	Appointee resigned in which he was not a candidate. Successor elected November 2, 2010, to finish the term ending January 3, 2013.	Joe Manchin (D)	November 15, 2010
Illinois (3)	Roland Burris (D)	Appointee resigned in which he was not a candidate. Successor elected November 2, 2010, to finish the final weeks of the Congress, and also elected to a full six-year term.	Mark Kirk (R)	November 29, 2010

=== House of Representatives ===
Five changes are associated with appointments to the Obama Administration, four directly and one indirectly. Two representatives changed parties, one died, and five resigned. House vacancies are only filled by elections. State laws regulate when (and if) there will be special elections.

House changes
District	Vacated by	Reason for change	Successor	Date of successor's formal installation
Illinois 5	Vacant	Rahm Emanuel (D) resigned near the end of the previous Congress while being re-elected at this Congress, after being named White House Chief of Staff under Obama administration. A special election was held April 7, 2009.	Mike Quigley (D)	April 7, 2009
New York 20	Kirsten Gillibrand (D)	Resigned January 26, 2009, when appointed to the Senate. A special election was held March 31, 2009.	Scott Murphy (D)	March 31, 2009
Northern Marianas at-large	Gregorio Sablan (I)	Changed party affiliation February 23, 2009. (Note: Gregorio Sablan was previously an independent who caucused with House Democrats.)	Gregorio Sablan (D)	February 23, 2009
California 32	Hilda Solis (D)	Resigned February 24, 2009, to become U.S. Secretary of Labor. A special election was held July 14, 2009.	Judy Chu (D)	July 14, 2009
California 10	Ellen Tauscher (D)	Resigned June 26, 2009, to become U.S. Undersecretary of State for Arms Control and International Security. A special election was held November 3, 2009.	John Garamendi (D)	November 3, 2009
New York 23	John M. McHugh (R)	Resigned September 21, 2009, to become U.S. Secretary of the Army. A special election was held November 3, 2009.	Bill Owens (D)	November 3, 2009
Alabama 5	Parker Griffith (D)	Changed party affiliation December 22, 2009.	Parker Griffith (R)	December 22, 2009
Florida 19	Robert Wexler (D)	Resigned January 3, 2010, to become president of the Center for Middle East Peace & Economic Cooperation. A special election was held April 13, 2010.	Ted Deutch (D)	April 13, 2010
Pennsylvania 12	John Murtha (D)	Died February 8, 2010. A special election was held May 18, 2010.	Mark Critz (D)	May 18, 2010
Hawaii 1	Neil Abercrombie (D)	Resigned February 28, 2010, to focus on run for Governor of Hawaii. A special election was held May 22, 2010.	Charles Djou (R)	May 22, 2010
New York 29	Eric Massa (D)	Resigned March 8, 2010, due to a recurrence of his cancer, as well as an ethics investigation. A special election was held contemporaneously with the general election on November 2, 2010.	Tom Reed (R)	November 2, 2010
Georgia 9	Nathan Deal (R)	Resigned March 21, 2010, to focus on run for Governor of Georgia. A special election runoff was held June 8, 2010.	Tom Graves (R)	June 8, 2010
Indiana 3	Mark Souder (R)	Resigned May 21, 2010, after an affair with a staff member was revealed. A special election was held contemporaneously with the general election on November 2, 2010.	Marlin Stutzman (R)	November 2, 2010
Illinois 10	Mark Kirk (R)	Resigned November 29, 2010, to succeed appointed Senator Roland Burris after winning the 2010 special election.	Vacant until the next Congress	

== Committees ==
Lists of committees and their party leaders for members of the House and Senate committees can be found through the Official Congressional Directory at the bottom of this article. The directory after the pages of terms of service lists committees of the Senate, House (Standing with Subcommittees, Select and Special) and Joint and, after that, House/Senate committee assignments. On the committees section of the House and Senate in the Official Congressional Directory, the committee's members on the first row on the left side shows the chairman of the committee and on the right side shows the ranking member of the committee.

=== Senate ===
Committee	Chairman	Ranking Member
Aging (special)	Herb Kohl (D-WI)	Bob Corker (R-TN)
Agriculture, Nutrition and Forestry	Blanche Lincoln (D-AR)	Saxby Chambliss (R-GA)
Appropriations	Daniel Inouye (D-HI)	Thad Cochran (R-MS)
Armed Services	Carl Levin (D-MI)	John McCain (R-AZ)
Banking, Housing and Urban Affairs	Chris Dodd (D-CT)	Richard Shelby (R-AL)
Budget	Kent Conrad (D-ND)	Judd Gregg (R-NH)
Commerce, Science and Transportation	Jay Rockefeller (D-WV)	Kay Bailey Hutchison (R-TX)
Energy and Natural Resources	Jeff Bingaman (D-NM)	Lisa Murkowski (R-AK)
Environment and Public Works	Barbara Boxer (D-CA)	Jim Inhofe (R-OK)
Ethics (select)	Barbara Boxer (D-CA)	Johnny Isakson (R-GA)
Finance	Max Baucus (D-MT)	Chuck Grassley (R-IA)
Foreign Relations	John Kerry (D-MA)	Richard Lugar (R-IN)
Health, Education, Labor and Pensions	Tom Harkin (D-IA)	Mike Enzi (R-WY)
Homeland Security and Governmental Affairs	Joe Lieberman (I-CT)	Susan Collins (R-ME)
Indian Affairs	Byron Dorgan (D-ND)	John Barrasso (R-WY)
Intelligence (select)	Dianne Feinstein (D-CA)	Kit Bond (R-MO)
Judiciary	Patrick Leahy (D-VT)	Jeff Sessions (R-AL)
Rules and Administration	Chuck Schumer (D-NY)	Bob Bennett (R-UT)
Small Business and Entrepreneurship	Mary Landrieu (D-LA)	Olympia Snowe (R-ME)
Veterans' Affairs	Daniel Akaka (D-HI)	Richard Burr (R-NC)

=== House of Representatives ===
- Agriculture (Collin C. Peterson, Chair; Frank Lucas, Ranking)
  - Conservation, Credit, Energy, and Research (Tim Holden, Chair; Bob Goodlatte, Ranking)
  - Department Operations, Oversight, Nutrition and Forestry (Joe Baca, Chair; Jeff Fortenberry, Ranking)
  - General Farm Commodities and Risk Management (Leonard Boswell, Chair; Jerry Moran, Ranking)
  - Horticulture and Organic Agriculture (Dennis Cardoza, Chair; Jean Schmidt, Ranking)
  - Livestock, Dairy, and Poultry (David Scott, Chair; Randy Neugebauer, Ranking)
  - Specialty Crops, Rural Development and Foreign Agriculture (Mike McIntyre, Chair; Mike Conaway, Ranking)
- Appropriations (David Obey, Chair; California Jerry Lewis, Ranking)
  - Agriculture, Rural Development, Food and Drug Administration, and Related Agencies (Rosa DeLauro, Chair; Jack Kingston, Ranking)
  - Commerce, Justice, Science, and Related Agencies (Alan Mollohan, Chair; Frank Wolf, Ranking)
  - Defense (Norman Dicks, Chair; Bill Young, Ranking)
  - Energy and Water Development (Pete Visclosky, Chair; Rodney Frelinghuysen, Ranking)
  - Financial Services and General Government (José Serrano, Chair; Jo Ann Emerson, Ranking)
  - Homeland Security (David E. Price, Chair; Hal Rogers, Ranking)
  - Interior, Environment, and Related Agencies (Jim Moran, Chair; Mike Simpson, Ranking)
  - Labor, Health and Human Services, Education, and Related Agencies (David Obey, Chair; Todd Tiahrt, Ranking)
  - Legislative Branch (Debbie Wasserman Schultz, Chair; Robert Aderholt, Ranking)
  - Military Construction, Veterans Affairs, and Related Agencies (Chet Edwards, Chair; Zach Wamp, Ranking)
  - State, Foreign Operations, and Related Programs (Nita Lowey, Chair; Kay Granger, Ranking)
  - Transportation, Housing and Urban Development, and Related Agencies (John Olver, Chair; Tom Latham, Ranking)
- Armed Services (Ike Skelton, Chair; Buck McKeon, Ranking)
  - Readiness (Solomon P. Ortiz, Chair; Randy Forbes, Ranking)
  - Seapower and Expeditionary Forces (Gene Taylor, Chair; Todd Akin, Ranking)
  - Air and Land Forces (Neil Abercrombie, Chair; Roscoe Bartlett, Ranking)
  - Oversight and Investigations (Vic Snyder, Chair; Rob Wittman, Ranking)
  - Military Personnel (Susan A. Davis, Chair; Joe Wilson, Ranking)
  - Terrorism and Unconventional Threats (Adam Smith, Chair; Jeff Miller, Ranking)
  - Strategic Forces (Jim Langevin, Chair; Mike Turner, Ranking)
- Budget (John Spratt, Chair; Paul Ryan, Ranking)
- Education and Labor (George Miller, Chair; John Kline, Ranking)
  - Early Childhood, Elementary and Secondary Education (Dale Kildee, Chair; Michael N. Castle, Ranking)
  - Healthy Families and Communities (Carolyn McCarthy, Chair; Todd Platts, Ranking)
  - Health, Employment, Labor, and Pensions (Robert E. Andrews, Chair; Tom Price, Ranking)
  - Higher Education, Lifelong Learning, and Competitiveness (Rubén Hinojosa, Chair; Brett Guthrie, Ranking)
  - Workforce Protections (Lynn C. Woolsey, Chair; Cathy McMorris Rodgers, Ranking)
- Energy and Commerce (Henry Waxman, Chair; Joe Barton, Ranking)
  - Health (Frank Pallone, Chair; Nathan Deal, Ranking)
  - Energy and Environment (Ed Markey, Chair; Fred Upton, Ranking)
  - Commerce, Trade and Consumer Protection (Bobby Rush, Chair; George Radanovich, Ranking)
  - Communications, Technology and the Internet (Rick Boucher, Chair; Cliff Stearns, Ranking)
  - Oversight and Investigations (Bart Stupak, Chair; Greg Walden, Ranking)
- Energy Independence and Global Warming (Select) (Ed Markey, Chair; James Sensenbrenner, Ranking)
- Financial Services (Barney Frank, Chair; Spencer Bachus, Ranking)
  - Domestic Monetary Policy and Technology (Mel Watt, Chair; Ron Paul, Ranking)
  - Oversight and Investigations (Mel Watt, Chair; Judy Biggert, Ranking)
  - International Monetary Policy and Trade (Gregory Meeks, Chair; Gary Miller, Ranking)
  - Housing and Community Opportunity (Maxine Waters, Chair; Shelley Moore Capito, Ranking)
  - Financial Institutions and Consumer Credit (Luis Gutierrez, Chair; Jeb Hensarling, Ranking)
  - Capital Markets, Insurance, and Government-Sponsored Enterprises (Paul Kanjorski, Chair; Scott Garrett, Ranking)
- Foreign Affairs (Howard Berman, Chair; Ileana Ros-Lehtinen, Ranking)
  - Africa and Global Health (Donald M. Payne, Chair; Chris Smith, Ranking)
  - Asia, the Pacific, and the Global Environment (Eni Faleomavaega, Chair; Donald A. Manzullo, Ranking)
  - Europe (Robert Wexler, Chair; Elton Gallegly, Ranking)
  - International Organizations, Human Rights, and Oversight (Bill Delahunt, Chair; Dana Rohrabacher, Ranking)
  - Middle East and South Asia (Gary Ackerman, Chair; Mike Pence, Ranking)
  - Terrorism, Nonproliferation, and Trade (Brad Sherman, Chair; Ed Royce, Ranking)
  - Western Hemisphere (Eliot L. Engel, Chair; Dan Burton, Ranking)
- Homeland Security (Bennie Thompson, Chair; Peter T. King, Ranking)
  - Border, Maritime and Global Counterterrorism (Loretta Sanchez, Chair; Mark Souder, Ranking)
  - Emergency Communications, Preparedness, and Response (Henry Cuellar, Chair; Charlie Dent, Ranking)
  - Emerging Threats, Cybersecurity, and Science and Technology (James Langevin, Chair; Michael McCaul, Ranking)
  - Intelligence, Information Sharing, and Terrorism Risk Assessment (Jane Harman, Chair; Dave Reichert, Ranking)
  - Management, Investigations, and Oversight (Chris Carney, Chair; Mike D. Rogers, Ranking)
  - Transportation Security and Infrastructure Protection (Sheila Jackson-Lee, Chair; Dan Lungren, Ranking)
- House Administration (Bob Brady, Chair; Dan Lungren, Ranking)
  - Capitol Security (Bob Brady, Chair; Dan Lungren, Ranking)
  - Elections (Zoe Lofgren, Chair; Kevin McCarthy, Ranking)
- Intelligence (Permanent Select) (Silvestre Reyes, Chair; Peter Hoekstra, Ranking)
  - Terrorism/HUMINT, Analysis and Counterintelligence (Mike Thompson, Chair; Mike Rogers, Ranking)
  - Technical and Tactical Intelligence (C.A. Dutch Ruppersberger, Chair;, Ranking)
  - Intelligence Community Management (Anna Eshoo, Chair; Darrell Issa, Ranking)
  - Oversight and Investigations (Robert E. Cramer, Chair; Terry Everett, Ranking)
- Judiciary (John Conyers, Chair; Lamar S. Smith, Ranking)
  - Commercial and Administrative Law (Linda T. Sánchez, Chair; Trent Franks, Ranking)
  - Constitution, Civil Rights, and Civil Liberties (Jerrold Nadler, Chair; James Sensenbrenner, Ranking)
  - Courts, the Internet, and Intellectual Property (Howard Berman, Chair; Howard Coble, Ranking)
  - Crime, Terrorism, and Homeland Security (Robert C. Scott, Chair; Louie Gohmert, Ranking)
  - Immigration, Citizenship, Refugees, Border Security, and International Law (Zoe Lofgren, Chair; Steve King, Ranking)
- Natural Resources (Nick Rahall, Chair; Doc Hastings, Ranking)
  - Energy and Mineral Resources (Jim Costa, Chair; Doug Lamborn, Ranking)
  - Insular Affairs, Oceans and Wildlife (Madeleine Bordallo, Chair; Henry E. Brown, Ranking)
  - National Parks, Forests and Public Lands (Raúl Grijalva, Chair; Rob Bishop, Ranking)
  - Water and Power (Grace Napolitano, Chair; Cathy McMorris Rodgers, Ranking)
- Oversight and Government Reform (Edolphus Towns, Chair; Darrell Issa, Ranking)
  - Domestic Policy (Dennis Kucinich, Chair; Jason Chaffetz, Ranking)
  - Federal Workforce, Post Office, and District of Columbia (Stephen Lynch, Chair; Kenny Marchant, Ranking)
  - Government Management, Organization, and Procurement (Diane Watson, Chair; Brian Bilbray, Ranking)
  - Information Policy, Census, and National Archives (Lacy Clay, Chair; Michael Turner, Ranking)
  - National Security and Foreign Affairs (John F. Tierney, Chair; [data missing], Ranking)
- Rules (Louise Slaughter, Chair; David Dreier, Ranking)
  - Legislative and Budget Process (Alcee Hastings, Chair; Lincoln Diaz-Balart, Ranking)
  - Rules and the Organization of the House (Jim McGovern, Chair; Doc Hastings, Ranking)
- Science and Technology (Bart Gordon, Chair; Ralph Hall, Ranking)
  - Space and Aeronautics (Gabby Giffords, Chair; Pete Olson, Ranking)
  - Technology and Innovation (David Wu, Chair; Adrian Smith, Ranking)
  - Research and Science Education (Daniel Lipinski, Chair; Vern Ehlers, Ranking)
  - Investigations and Oversight (Brad Miller, Chair; Paul Broun, Ranking)
  - Energy and Environment (Brian Baird, Chair; Bob Inglis, Ranking)
- Small Business (Nydia Velázquez, Chair; Sam Graves, Ranking)
  - Finance and Tax (Melissa Bean, Chair; Dean Heller, Ranking)
  - Contracting and Technology (Glenn Nye, Chair; Aaron Schock, Ranking)
  - Rural and Urban Entrepreneurship (Heath Shuler, Chair; Jeff Fortenberry, Ranking)
  - Regulations, Healthcare and Trade (Kathy Dahlkemper, Chair; Lynn Westmoreland, Ranking)
  - Investigations and Oversight (Jason Altmire, Chair; Louie Gohmert, Ranking)
- Standards of Official Conduct (Zoe Lofgren, Chair; Jo Bonner, Ranking)
- Transportation and Infrastructure (James Oberstar, Chair; John Mica, Ranking)
  - Aviation (Jerry Costello, Chair; Thomas Petri, Ranking)
  - Coast Guard and Maritime Transportation (Elijah Cummings, Chair; Frank LoBiondo, Ranking)
  - Economic Development, Public Buildings and Emergency Management (Eleanor Holmes Norton, Chair; Sam Graves, Ranking)
  - Highways and Transit (Peter DeFazio, Chair; Jimmy Duncan, Ranking)
  - Railroads, Pipelines, and Hazardous Materials (Corrine Brown, Chair; Bill Shuster, Ranking)
  - Water Resources and Environment (Eddie Bernice Johnson, Chair; Jimmy Duncan, Ranking)
- Veterans' Affairs (Bob Filner, Chair; Steve Buyer, Ranking)
  - Disability Assistance and Memorial Affairs (John Hall, Chair; Doug Lamborn, Ranking)
  - Economic Opportunity (Stephanie Herseth Sandlin, Chair; John Boozman, Ranking)
  - Health (Michael Michaud, Chair; Jeff Miller, Ranking)
  - Oversight and Investigations (Harry Mitchell, Chair; Ginny Brown-Waite, Ranking)
- Ways and Means (Sander Levin, from March 4, 2010 (acting; Dave Camp, Ranking)
  - Health (Pete Stark, Chair; Wally Herger, Ranking)
  - Social Security (John S. Tanner, Chair; Sam Johnson, Ranking)
  - Income Security and Family Support (Jim McDermott, Chair; John Linder, Ranking)
  - Trade (Sander Levin, Chair; Kevin Brady, Ranking)
  - Oversight (John Lewis, Chair; Charles Boustany, Ranking)
  - Select Revenue Measures (Richard Neal, Chair; Pat Tiberi, Ranking)
- Whole

=== Joint committees ===
- Economic (Rep. Carolyn Maloney, Chair; Sen. Sam Brownback, Ranking)
- The Library (Rep. Zoe Lofgren, Chair; Sen. Bob Bennett, Ranking)
- Printing, (Rep. Bob Brady, Chair; Rep. Dan Lungren, Ranking)
- Joint Committee on Taxation (Sen. Max Baucus, Chair; Sen. Chuck Grassley, Ranking)

== Employees ==
=== Legislative branch agency directors ===
- Architect of the Capitol: Stephen T. Ayers (acting until May 12, 2010, and starting May 12, 2010)
- Attending Physician of the United States Congress: Brian Monahan
- Comptroller General of the United States: Eugene Louis Dodaro (acting until December 22, 2010, and starting December 22, 2010)
- Director of the Congressional Budget Office: Robert A. Sunshine (acting), until January 22, 2009
  - Douglas W. Elmendorf, from January 22, 2009
- Librarian of Congress: James H. Billington
- Public Printer of the United States: Robert C. Tapella, until December 29, 2010
  - William J. Boarman, from December 29, 2010

=== Senate ===
- Chaplain: Barry C. Black (Seventh-day Adventist)
- Curator: Diane K. Skvarla
- Historian: Richard A. Baker, until 2009
  - Donald A. Ritchie, from 2009
- Parliamentarian: Alan Frumin
- Secretary: Nancy Erickson
- Librarian: Leona I. Faust
- Sergeant at Arms: Terrance W. Gainer
- Secretary for the Majority: Lula J. Davis
- Secretary for the Minority: David J. Schiappa

=== House of Representatives ===
Employees include: (Note: Rules of the House: "Other officers and officials")

- Chaplain: Daniel P. Coughlin (Roman Catholic)
- Chief Administrative Officer: Daniel P. Beard, until July 1, 2010
  - Daniel Strodel, from July 18, 2010
- Clerk: Lorraine Miller
- Historian: Robert Remini, until 2010
  - Matthew Wasniewski, from October 20, 2010
- Parliamentarian: John V. Sullivan
- Reading Clerks: Jaime Zapata (D), Susan Cole (R)
- Sergeant at Arms: Wilson "Bill" Livingood
- Inspector General: James J. Cornell, until January 2, 2010
  - Theresa M. Grafenstine, from July 30, 2010

== See also ==
=== Elections ===
- 2008 United States elections (elections leading to this Congress)
  - 2008 United States presidential election
  - 2008 United States Senate elections
  - 2008 United States House of Representatives elections
- 2010 United States elections (elections during this Congress, leading to the next Congress)
  - 2010 United States Senate elections
  - 2010 United States House of Representatives elections

=== Membership lists ===
- Members of the 111th United States Congress
- List of new members of the 111th United States Congress
- Caucuses of the United States Congress
