= Universal Right to Vote by Mail Act =

The Universal Right to Vote by Mail Act (H.R. 1604, S. 3299) is a proposed bill that would "Amend the Help America Vote Act of 2002 to prohibit a state from imposing additional conditions or requirements on the eligibility of an individual to cast a vote in federal elections by mail, except to the extent that it imposes a deadline for requesting the ballot and returning it to the appropriate state or local election official.". The bill would remove restrictions in 22 states that require specific reasons, such as doctors notes, for voting absentee by mail.

== Background ==
No-excuse early voting in U.S. states, as of September, 2014. in-person and postal in-person only postal only none

In the United States, an absentee ballot is a ballot that the voter records and casts other than at a designated polling station on Election Day. Typically these ballots are mailed, though some states provide provisions for emailing ballots, faxing ballots, or delivering them in person to a designated location. Typically a voter must request an absentee ballot at least a week before the election occurs. Each State's Secretary of State or Director of Elections is in charge of the election process, including voter registration and absentee ballot requests. Balloting materials may be sent via the United States Postal Service without prepayment of postage for members of the Armed Forces, members of the U.S. Merchant Marine and U.S. citizens residing outside the territorial limits of the United States and the District of Columbia and their spouses.

As of September 30, 2014:

- 33 states and the District of Columbia allow early voting with no-excuse required.
- 27 states and the District of Columbia permit voters to vote absentee without requiring an excuse.
- 20 states permit voters to vote via absentee ballots but require an excuse.
- 6 states and the District of Columbia allow voters to request 'Permanent Absentee Status'.
- 5 states (Oregon, Washington, Colorado, Utah, and Hawaii) conduct their elections completely by mail.

== Provisions ==
- Allows all eligible voters nationwide to vote by mail for any reason in federal elections.
- Removes the doctor’s note, notary and privacy information requirements imposed by some states.

== Legislative history ==
=== House ===
The bill was originally introduced on January 5, 2007 during the 110th congress by Susan Davis. However, it never got past the committee phase in the House.

The bill was again introduced by Rep. Susan Davis (D-California) on March 19, 2009. It currently has 50 co-sponsors. The bill cleared the House Administration Committee on June 10. The next step is a vote on the House floor.

=== Senate ===
An identical copy of the bill was introduced in the Senate during the 111th congress on May 5, 2010 by Senator Ron Wyden (D-Oregon). It was read twice and referred to the Senate Committee on Rules and Administration.

== Related bills ==
The bill is essentially part of a package with two other bills also authored by Congresswoman Davis. The other two, which both passed committee the same day as the main bill are...

- The Absentee Ballot Track, Receive and Confirm (TRAC) Act (H.R. 2510) which gives states grant money to set up a system to track absentee ballots. Through the system, a voter will be able to find out if a ballot was mailed, if their completed ballot was received, and if their ballot was counted.

- The Federal Election Integrity Act (H.R. 512) prohibits the chief elections official of a state from serving on federal campaign committees or engaging in other political activity, such as fundraising, on behalf of federal candidates in any election over which the official has supervisory authority."
