= United States House Intelligence Subcommittee on Intelligence Community Management =

The House Intelligence Subcommittee on Intelligence Community Management is one of the four subcommittees within the Permanent Select Committee on Intelligence

== Members, 111th Congress ==
Majority	Minority
Anna Eshoo, California, Chairwoman; Rush D. Holt, Jr., New Jersey, Vice Chair; Jan Schakowsky, Illinois; Patrick Murphy, Pennsylvania	Sue Myrick, North Carolina, Ranking Member; Roy Blunt, Missouri; Mike Conaway, Texas
Ex officio
Silvestre Reyes, Texas	Peter Hoekstra, Michigan
