= United States House Intelligence Subcommittee on Terrorism/HUMINT, Analysis and Counterintelligence =

The House Intelligence Subcommittee on Terrorism/HUMINT, Analysis and Counterintelligence is one of the four subcommittees within the Permanent Select Committee on Intelligence.

== Members, 110th Congress ==
| Majority | Minority |
|---|---|
| Mike Thompson, Chairman, California; Leonard Boswell, Vice Chair, Iowa; Jim Langevin, Rhode Island; Alcee Hastings, Florida; Silvestre Reyes, Texas (Ex officio) | Mike Rogers, Ranking Member, Michigan; Terry Everett, Alabama; John McHugh, New York; Peter Hoekstra, Michigan (Ex officio) |
