= Unemployment Compensation Extension Act of 2010 =

The Unemployment Compensation Extension Act of 2010 (Pub. L. 111–205 (text) (PDF)) is an American law that was signed into law by President Barack Obama in July 2010. It extends the filing period for unemployment benefits for Americans affected to the serious economic recession of 2007 until November 2010.
