= Fur Act =

The Fur Products Labeling Act (Pub. L. 111–313 (text) (PDF), 15 U.S.C. § 69), otherwise known as the Fur Act, is a United States act banning the misbranding of fur products and requiring a name guide for fur products, among other things. The act does not apply to fur gained from trapping or hunting and does not apply to the face to face transactions between the customer and the seller, provided the seller trapped or hunted the animal the fur originated from, the location of sale is not the seller's own permanent business premises and that the income generated by sales is not the seller's primary income.
