= Consolidated Appropriations Act, 2010 =

The Consolidated Appropriations Act, 2010 is the name of a United States appropriations bill created in the conference report for H.R. 3288, originally the Transportation, and Housing and Urban Development Appropriations Act, 2010. The bill, signed into law on December 16, 2009, combined six of the seven fiscal year 2010 appropriations bills that were still pending before Congress near the end of 2009.

The six bills contained within the Consolidated Appropriations Act, 2010 are:

| DIVISION A | − | TRANSPORTATION, HOUSING AND URBAN DEVELOPMENT, AND RELATED AGENCIES APPROPRIATIONS ACT, 2010 |
| DIVISION B | − | COMMERCE, JUSTICE, SCIENCE, AND RELATED AGENCIES APPROPRIATIONS ACT, 2010 |
| DIVISION C | − | FINANCIAL SERVICES AND GENERAL GOVERNMENT APPROPRIATIONS ACT, 2010 |
| DIVISION D | − | DEPARTMENTS OF LABOR, HEALTH AND HUMAN SERVICES, AND EDUCATION, AND RELATED AGENCIES APPROPRIATIONS ACT, 2010 |
| DIVISION E | − | MILITARY CONSTRUCTION AND VETERANS AFFAIRS AND RELATED AGENCIES APPROPRIATIONS ACT, 2010 |
| DIVISION F | − | DEPARTMENT OF STATE, FOREIGN OPERATIONS, AND RELATED PROGRAMS APPROPRIATIONS ACT, 2010 |

The defense appropriations dealt with separately soon after passage. The bill follows a similar bill from the previous year.
