= Improper Payments Elimination and Recovery Act of 2010 =

The United States Improper Payments Elimination and Recovery Act of 2010 (H.R. 3393) was signed by President Barack Obama into law on July 22, 2010. The law requires federal agencies to periodically review and report on major programs that are susceptible to improper payments.

An improper payment is a government payment that "should not have been made or that was made in an incorrect amount under statutory, contractual, administrative, or other legally applicable requirements".

Earlier legislation regarding improper payments included the Improper Payments Information Act of 2002.
