= Caregivers and Veterans Omnibus Health Services Act of 2010 =

The Caregivers and Veterans Omnibus Health Services Act of 2010 (Pub. L. 111–163 (text) (PDF)) was signed into law by President Barack Obama on May 5, 2010. The law provides several benefits for veterans and their families.

The bill was heavily supported by the Iraq and Afghanistan Veterans of America.
