= Communications law =

Regulation of electronic communications

Communications law refers to the regulation of electronic communications by wire or radio. It encompasses regulations governing broadcasting, telephone and telecommunications service, cable television, satellite communications, wireless telecommunications, and the Internet.

== History ==
In the 19th century cross-border communication was facilitated by the development of the telegraph and Morse code. The first transatlantic cable was installed between 1858 and 1866. To address these developments international organizations were created, notably the International Telegraph Union in 1865 (today the International Telecommunication Union).

== Areas of Communications Law ==
Communications laws regulate the activities of a communications service provider and the use of public resources for the deployment of communications facilities and services in the following broad areas:

=== Radiospectrum Regulation ===
Rules for spectrum management governing who may make transmissions over the public airwaves and under what conditions; Assignment of blocks of radio frequency for government, private, public, or commercial use by allocation or spectrum auction.

=== Market Regulation ===
Rules governing relationships between various communications industries and market participants designed to ensure the steady flow of communications and prevent market failures; Includes rules governing broadcast signal must-carry and retransmission consent, the interconnection of telecommunications facilities, wireless network roaming, intercarrier compensation, cable program access and carriage, net neutrality, and utility pole attachments.

=== Content Regulation ===
Rules prohibiting broadcast obscenity and limiting the commercial content of children's programming; Rules to ensure media coverage of local events and to preserve diversity of viewpoints by preventing too much concentration of media ownership in local markets.

=== Access to Markets ===
Rules designed to ensure communications markets are open to new entrants; Includes regulations limiting state and local authority to charge excessive fees or deny access to the public right-of-way (transportation) for deploying communications facilities.

=== Consumer Protection ===
Ensuring the reasonableness of rates, terms, and conditions of communications services offered to the public, particularly in areas that lack competition in one or more services; Rules requiring closed captioning and services for the hearing impaired; Review of communications provider mergers and acquisitions to ensure the public will benefit from the consolidation.

== Communications Law in the United States ==
In the United States, the primary sources of communications law are the federal Communications Act of 1934, as amended by subsequent legislation including the Communications Assistance for Law Enforcement Act, the Cable Communications Act of 1984, the Satellite Home Viewer Act, the Cable Television Consumer Protection and Competition Act, and the Telecommunications Act of 1996. All of these federal statutes are codified at Title 47 of the United States Code. Communications law also includes various state laws regulating public utilities, telecommunications, cable television, and wireless antennas.

Communications regulations are found in Title 47 of the Code of Federal Regulations by the Federal Communications Commission and the National Telecommunications and Information Administration of the United States Department of Commerce, and in state regulatory codes by the Public Utilities Commission of each state. Communications lawyers are represented by the Federal Communications Bar Association, an organization for attorneys and engineers involved in "the development, interpretation and practice of communications law and policy."
