= List of acts of the 111th United States Congress =

The acts of the 111th United States Congress include all laws enacted and treaties ratified by the 111th United States Congress, which lasted from January 3, 2009 to January 3, 2011. Such acts include public and private laws, which were enacted after being passed by Congress and signed by the President. There were no overridden vetoes.

== Summary of actions ==
Of the statutes enacted by Congress, only the first was promulgated by President George W. Bush in the last week of his term. The remainder were signed by President Barack Obama. Only one was vetoed.

== Public laws ==
PL#	Date enacted	Short title	Description
111-1	January 16, 2009	(No short title)	Authorized a salary rollback (a Saxbe fix) for the Secretary of the Interior (so Ken Salazar could assume the seat)
111-2	January 29, 2009	Lilly Ledbetter Fair Pay Act of 2009	Changed the statute of limitations for pay discrimination
111-3	February 4, 2009	Children's Health Insurance Program Reauthorization Act of 2009	Expanded funding and eligibility for the State Children's Health Insurance Program
111-4	February 11, 2009	DTV Delay Act	Delayed the digital television transition deadline from February 17, 2009 to June 12, 2009
111-5	February 17, 2009	American Recovery and Reinvestment Act of 2009	Authorized approximately $787 billion in supplemental appropriations for the 2009 fiscal year
111-6	March 6, 2009	Continuing Appropriations Resolution, 2009 (2nd)	Continued funding for government agencies for an extra five days within the 2009 fiscal year
111-7	March 9, 2009	(No short title)	Named a Postal Service building in Springfield, Illinois for Colonel John H. Wilson Jr.
111-8	March 11, 2009	Omnibus Appropriations Act, 2009	Authorized approximately $410 billion in additional appropriations for various agencies and programs for the 2009 fiscal year
111-9	March 20, 2009	(No short title)	Extended certain immigration programs through the 2009 fiscal year
111-10	March 20, 2009	(No short title)	Extended certain small business programs through July 31, 2009
111-11	March 30, 2009	Omnibus Public Land Management Act of 2009	Designated approximately 2 million acres (8,100 km^{2}) of land as protected wilderness
111-12	March 30, 2009	Federal Aviation Administration Extension Act of 2009	Extended certain aviation programs through the 2009 fiscal year
111-13	April 21, 2009	Edward M. Kennedy Serve America Act	Expanded national service programs (such as AmeriCorps) and created several new ones
111-14	April 23, 2009	(No short title)	Named a federal courthouse in Rockford, Illinois after Stanley Julian Roszkowski
111-15	April 24, 2009	Special Inspector General for the Troubled Asset Relief Program Act of 2009	Provided the Troubled Asset Relief Program Special Inspector General with additional powers
111-16	May 7, 2009	Statutory Time-Periods Technical Amendments Act of 2009	Made technical amendments to laws containing time periods affecting judicial proceedings
111-17	May 7, 2009	(No short title)	Provided for the appointment of David Rubenstein as a regent of the Smithsonian Institution
111-18	May 8, 2009	(No short title)	Formally repealed the Bennett Freeze that barred development on parts of the Hopi and Navajo Indian Reservations
111-19	May 12, 2009	Civil Rights History Project Act of 2009	Directed the Library of Congress and the Smithsonian Institution to initiate a project chronicling the history of the Civil Rights Movement
111-20	May 15, 2009	Protecting Incentives for the Adoption of Children with Special Needs Act of 2009	Ensured that the states received adoption incentive payments for the 2008 fiscal year
111-21	May 20, 2009	Fraud Enforcement and Recovery Act of 2009	Broadened the definition of financial crimes and authorized additional funds for the 2010 financial year for federal agencies involved with detecting and prosecuting such crimes
111-22	May 20, 2009	Helping Families Save Their Homes Act of 2009 (Division A)	Expanded access and eligibility to the HOPE for Homeowners program and expanded Federal Deposit Insurance Corporation authorization to prevent mortgage foreclosures
111-22	May 20, 2009	Homeless Emergency Assistance and Rapid Transition to Housing Act of 2009 (Division B)	Consolidates various McKinney-Vento Homeless Assistance Act of 1986 programs and establishes a federal goal of ensuring that individuals and families who become homeless return to permanent housing within 30 days
111-23	May 22, 2009	Weapon Systems Acquisition Reform Act of 2009	Reformed the process through which the Department of Defense purchases major weapon systems
111-24	May 22, 2009	Credit CARD Act of 2009	Limited the way in which credit card companies could charge consumers
111-25	June 2, 2009	Ronald Reagan Centennial Commission Act	Established a commission to honor the hundredth anniversary (in 2011) of the birth of Ronald Reagan
111-26	June 19, 2009	(No short title)	Named a Postal Service building in Sparta, Georgia for Yvonne Ingram-Ephraim
111-27	June 19, 2009	(No short title)	Named a Postal Service building in Jamestown, New York for Stan Lundine
111-28	June 19, 2009	(No short title)	Named a Postal Service building in McLain, Mississippi for Ed Freeman
111-29	June 19, 2009	(No short title)	Named a Postal Service building in Rochester, New York for Brian Schramm
111-30	June 19, 2009	Antitrust Criminal Penalty Enhancement and Reform Act of 2004 Extension Act	Extended part of the Criminal Penalty Enhancement and Reform Act of 2004 through June 22, 2010
111-31	June 22, 2009	Family Smoking Prevention and Tobacco Control Act (Division A)	Granted the Food and Drug Administration the power to regulate the tobacco industry and placed new limits on tobacco advertisements and products
111-31	June 22, 2009	Federal Retirement Reform Act of 2009 (Division B)	Enhanced eligibility and coverage under the Thrift Savings Plan
111-32	June 24, 2009	Supplemental Appropriations Act, 2009	Appropriated supplemental 2009 fiscal year funds for the wars in Iraq and Afghanistan and established the Car Allowance Rebate System program
111-33	June 26, 2009	Native American Heritage Day Act of 2009	Designated the Friday after Thanksgiving "Native American Heritage Day"
111-34	June 30, 2009	(No short title)	Named a federal building and courthouse in Elizabeth City, North Carolina for Herbert Small
111-35	June 30, 2009	(No short title)	Named a federal building in New York City for Ron Brown
111-36	June 30, 2009	Webcaster Settlement Act of 2009	Provided for webcasting sound recording reproduction and performance agreements
111-37	June 30, 2009	Veterans' Compensation Cost-of-Living Adjustment Act of 2009	Provided a cost of living increase in compensation for disabled military veterans
111-38	June 30, 2009	(No short title)	Provided additional personnel for the Special Inspector General for Afghanistan Reconstruction
111-39	July 1, 2009	(No short title)	Made technical corrections to the Higher Education Act of 1965
111-40	July 1, 2009	(No short title)	Authorized a Congressional Gold Medal for the Women Airforce Service Pilots of World War II
111-41	July 27, 2009	Korean War Veterans Recognition Act	Encouraged the display of the flag of the United States on National Korean War Veterans Armistice Day (July 27)
111-42	July 28, 2009	(No short title)	Renewed import restrictions with Burma in the Burmese Freedom and Democracy Act of 2003 for an additional three years and made minor changes to the tax code
111-43	July 31, 2009	(No short title)	Extended certain small business programs through September 30, 2009
111-44	August 7, 2009	New Frontier Congressional Gold Medal Act	Authorized a Congressional Gold Medal for Buzz Aldrin, Neil Armstrong, and Michael Collins (the crew of Apollo 11, the first human lunar landing mission) and John Glenn (the first American to orbit the Earth)
111-45	August 7, 2009	(No short title)	Authorized the use of funds under the Trademark Act of 1946 for patent operations and for other purposes
111-46	August 7, 2009	(No short title)	Restored previously appropriated sums to the Highway Trust Fund and amended parts of the Omnibus Appropriations Act, 2009
111-47	August 7, 2009	(No short title)	Authorized $2 billion in supplemental appropriations for the Car Allowance Rebate System program for the 2009 fiscal year
111-48	August 12, 2009	Miami Dade College Land Conveyance Act	Provided the conveyance of a parcel of land held by the Federal Bureau of Prisons to Miami Dade College
111-49	August 12, 2009	Judicial Survivors Protection Act of 2009	Provided a limited period for federal judges to opt into the Judicial Survivors' Annuities System and begin contributing toward its annuity
111-50	August 19, 2009	(No short title)	Named a Postal Service building in Long Island City, New York for Geraldine Ferraro
111-51	August 19, 2009	(No short title)	Named a Postal Service building in Freedom, Pennsylvania for John Scott Challis
111-52	August 19, 2009	(No short title)	Named a Postal Service building in Pompano Beach, Florida for Elijah Pat Larkins
111-53	August 19, 2009	Utah Recreational Land Exchange Act of 2009	Directed the exchange of certain lands in Grand, San Juan, and Uintah Counties, Utah
111-54	August 19, 2009	(No short title)	Named a Postal Service building in Rye, New York for Caroline O'Day
111-55	August 19, 2009	(No short title)	Named a Postal Service building in Ogdensburg, New York for Frederic Remington
111-56	August 19, 2009	(No short title)	Named a Postal Service building in Nampa, Idaho for Herbert Littleton
111-57	August 19, 2009	(No short title)	Named a Postal Service building in Laredo, Texas in honor of local veterans
111-58	August 19, 2009	(No short title)	Named a Postal Service building in Georgetown, Texas for Kile West
111-59	August 19, 2009	(No short title)	Named a Postal Service building in Port Charlotte, Florida for Roy Boehm
111-60	August 19, 2009	(No short title)	Extended the deadline for the commencement of the construction of a hydroelectric project
111-61	August 19, 2009	(No short title)	Recognized the service, sacrifice, honor, and professionalism of the non-commissioned officers of the Army
111-62	August 19, 2009	(No short title)	Granted the consent and approval of Congress to amendments made to the Washington Metropolitan Area Transit Regulation Compact between the District of Columbia, Maryland, and Virginia
111-63	September 18, 2009	WIPA and PABSS Reauthorization Act of 2009	Reauthorized the Work Incentives Planning and Assistance and the Protection and Advocacy for Beneficiaries of Social Security programs for one year
111-64	September 18, 2009	(No short title)	Provided for the appointment of France Córdova as a regent of the Smithsonian Institution
111-65	September 30, 2009	(No short title)	Authorized a Congressional Gold Medal for Arnold Palmer
111-66	September 30, 2009	(No short title)	Extended certain Small Business Administration programs through October 31, 2009
111-67	September 30, 2009	Defense Production Act Reauthorization of 2009	Reauthorized the Defense Production Act of 1950 and other related provisions
111-68	October 1, 2009	Legislative Branch Appropriations Act, 2010 (Division A)	Provided appropriations for the legislative branch for the 2010 fiscal year
111-68	October 1, 2009	Continuing Appropriations Resolution, 2010 (Division B)	Extended continuing appropriations for certain programs until October 31, 2009 or until their respective 2010 fiscal year appropriations are enacted, depending on which comes first
111-69	October 1, 2009	Fiscal Year 2010 Federal Aviation Administration Extension Act	Provided an extension of the taxes funding the Airport and Airway Trust Fund along with reauthorization for expenditures on various airport and airway improvement programs for the 2010 fiscal year
111-70	October 9, 2009	(No short title)	Reauthorized the Advisory Commission on Public Diplomacy for an additional year
111-71	October 9, 2009	(No short title)	Reauthorized Radio Free Asia for an additional year
111-72	October 13, 2009	(No short title)	Delayed the date that a change in the way Medicare pays for certain medical equipment could be implemented to January 1, 2010
111-73	October 15, 2009	Enhanced Partnership with Pakistan Act of 2009	Authorized appropriations for the 2010 through 2014 fiscal years to promote an enhanced strategic partnership with Pakistan and its people
111-74	October 19, 2009	(No short title)	Named a federal building and courthouse in Canton, Ohio for Ralph Regula
111-75	October 19, 2009	(No short title)	Named a federal courthouse in El Paso, Texas after Albert Armendariz
111-76	October 19, 2009	(No short title)	Authorized the conveyance of a parcel land in Galveston, Texas to the Galveston Historical Foundation
111-77	October 19, 2009	(No short title)	Named a federal building in Chicago for Bill Lipinski
111-78	October 19, 2009	(No short title)	Named a federal courthouse in Key West, Florida after Sidney M. Aronovitz
111-79	October 19, 2009	Foreign Evidence Request Efficiency Act of 2009	Enhanced and amended the procedure for cooperating with requests to secure evidence for use in legal proceedings in foreign courts by their respective law enforcement entities
111-80	October 21, 2009	Agriculture, Rural Development, Food and Drug Administration, and Related Agencies Appropriations Act, 2010	Appropriated funds for numerous federal agencies for the 2010 fiscal year
111-81	October 22, 2009	Veterans Health Care Budget Reform and Transparency Act of 2009	Provided for advance appropriation authority for certain medical care accounts of the Department of Veterans Affairs
111-82	October 26, 2009	(No short title)	Authorized certain major medical facility leases for the Department of Veterans Affairs for the 2010 fiscal year
111-83	October 28, 2009	Department of Homeland Security Appropriations Act, 2010	Appropriated funds for the Department of Homeland Security for the 2010 fiscal year
111-84	October 28, 2009	National Defense Authorization Act for Fiscal Year 2010	Appropriated funds for the military activities of the Department of Defense, the defense activities of the Department of Energy, and prescribed various military policies and practices for the 2010 fiscal year; also expanded federal hate crime law to include crimes motivated by a victim's actual or perceived gender, sexual orientation, gender identity, or disability (see: Matthew Shepard Act)
111-85	October 28, 2009	Energy and Water Development and Related Agencies Appropriations Act, 2010	Appropriated funds for the energy and water development programs of the Department of the Army, Department of the Interior, Department of Energy, and other related agencies for the 2010 fiscal year
111-86	October 29, 2009	Girl Scouts USA Centennial Commemorative Coin Act of 2009	Authorized the minting of silver $1 coins commemorating the Girl Scouts' centennial in 2012
111-87	October 30, 2009	Ryan White HIV/AIDS Treatment Extension Act of 2009	Extended the HIV/AIDS treatment program authorized under the Ryan White Care Act
111-88	October 30, 2009	Department of the Interior, Environment, and Related Agencies Appropriations Act, 2010 (Division A)	Appropriated funds for various operations of the Department of the Interior, the Environmental Protection Agency, and related agencies for the 2010 fiscal year
111-88	October 30, 2009	Further Continuing Appropriations, 2010 (Division B)	Extended funding for certain programs for the 2010 fiscal year
111-89	October 30, 2009	(No short title)	Extended certain small business programs through January 31, 2010
111-90	November 3, 2009	Morris K. Udall Scholarship and Excellence in National Environmental Policy Amendments Act of 2009	Made technical changes to the operations of the Morris K. Udall Foundation
111-91	November 6, 2009	Medal of Honor Commemorative Coin Act of 2009	Authorized the minting of gold $5 and silver $1 coins commemorating the establishment of the Medal of Honor in 1861
111-92	November 6, 2009	Worker, Homeownership, and Business Assistance Act of 2009	Extended unemployment benefits for 20 weeks in states with an unemployment rate higher than 8.5% and for 14 weeks in the other states, and extended the first-time homebuyer's tax credit until July 1, 2010
111-93	November 6, 2009	Credit CARD Technical Corrections Act of 2009	Made a technical correction to the Credit CARD Act of 2009
111-94	November 6, 2009	(No short title)	Posthumously granted honorary citizenship to Casimir Pulaski
111-95	November 6, 2009	(No short title)	Granted a federal charter to the Military Officers Association of America
111-96	November 6, 2009	(No short title)	Extended funding for an emergency communications grant program through September 30, 2012
111-97	November 11, 2009	Military Spouses Residency Relief Act	Extended certain privileges to the spouses of military personnel
111-98	November 11, 2009	(No short title)	Authorized a construction project at a Department of Veterans Affairs medical center in Walla Walla, Washington
111-99	November 30, 2009	(No short title)	Named a Postal Service building in Rollingbay, Bainbridge Island, Washington for John D. Hawk
111-100	November 30, 2009	(No short title)	Named a Postal Service building in Dade City, Florida for Marcus Mathes
111-101	November 30, 2009	(No short title)	Named a Department of Agriculture research laboratory in Lane, Oklahoma, and a Postal Service building in Bennington, Oklahoma for Wes Watkins
111-102	November 30, 2009	(No short title)	Named a Postal Service building in Akron, Michigan in honor of local veterans
111-103	November 30, 2009	(No short title)	Named a Postal Service building in Garden City, Michigan for John Shivnen
111-104	November 30, 2009	(No short title)	Named a Postal Service building in Los Angeles for Johnny Grant
111-105	November 30, 2009	(No short title)	Named a Postal Service building in Erath, Louisiana for Conrad DeRouen
111-106	November 30, 2009	(No short title)	Named a Postal Service building in San Francisco for Lim Poon Lee
111-107	November 30, 2009	(No short title)	Named a Postal Service building in Des Moines, Iowa in honor of local veterans
111-108	November 30, 2009	(No short title)	Named a Postal Service building in Provo, Utah for Rex Lee
111-109	November 30, 2009	(No short title)	Named a Postal Service building in San Diego, California for César Chávez
111-110	November 30, 2009	(No short title)	Named a Postal Service building in Orchard Park, New York, for Jack Kemp
111-111	November 30, 2009	(No short title)	Named a Postal Service building in Portland, Oregon, for Martin Luther King Jr.
111-112	November 30, 2009	(No short title)	Extended the authority for continuing federal employee relocation expenses test programs and made other technical changes
111-113	December 14, 2009	Reserve Officers Association Modernization Act of 2009	Amended the charter of the Reserve Officers Association to include new leadership positions
111-114	December 14, 2009	(No short title)	Enabled current members of the Board of Directors for the Office of Compliance to serve three-year terms
111-115	December 15, 2009	No Social Security Benefits for Prisoners Act of 2009	Prohibited certain retroactive Social Security payments for periods in which the recipient was in prison, a fugitive felon, or in violation of parole or probation
111-116	December 16, 2009	Fiscal Year 2010 Federal Aviation Administration Extension Act, Part II	Provided an extension of the taxes funding the Airport and Airway Trust Fund along with reauthorization for expenditures on various airport and airway improvement programs for the 2010 fiscal year
111-117	December 16, 2009	Consolidated Appropriations Act, 2010	Authorized additional appropriations for various agencies and programs for the 2010 fiscal year
111-118	December 19, 2009	Department of Defense Appropriations Act, 2010	Authorized additional appropriations for various Department of Defense programs for the 2010 fiscal year
111-119	December 21, 2009	Airline Flight Crew Technical Corrections Act	Amended the Family and Medical Leave Act of 1993 to clarify the eligibility requirements for airline flight crew members
111-120	December 22, 2009	(No short title)	Extended through December 31, 2010 the Secretary of the Army's authority to accept and act on funds from state and local governments with respect to water resource projects that concern the Army Corps of Engineers
111-121	December 22, 2009	(No short title)	Designated January 5, 2010 as the day that the second regular session of the 111th United States Congress would begin
111-122	December 22, 2009	Human Rights Enforcement Act of 2009	Mandated the establishment of a section within the Department of Justice Criminal Division to enforce human rights laws and made technical changes to immigration law that pertains to human rights
111-123	December 28, 2009	(No short title)	Increased the public debt limit to $12,394,000,000,000
111-124	December 28, 2009	(No short title)	Extended the trade preference system authorized under the Andean Trade Promotion and Drug Eradication Act until December 31, 2010 and made other technical changes with respect to international trade and taxes
111-125	December 28, 2009	(No short title)	Extended liability protection for commercial space launch providers through December 31, 2010
111-126	January 22, 2010	(No short title)	Granted income tax benefits for charitable cash contributions for efforts related to the relief of victims of the 2010 Haiti earthquake
111-127	January 27, 2010	Emergency Aid to American Survivors of the Haiti Earthquake Act	Authorized additional 2010 fiscal year payments to the United States Repatriation Program and to Medicare
111-128	January 29, 2010	(No short title)	Named a Postal Service building in Somerville, Tennessee for John Shelton Wilder
111-129	January 29, 2010	(No short title)	Named a Postal Service building in Chester, New York for Louis Allen
111-130	January 29, 2010	(No short title)	Named a Postal Service building in St. Louis, Missouri for Jodie Bailey
111-131	January 29, 2010	(No short title)	Named a Postal Service building in Portola, California for Jeremiah McCleery
111-132	January 29, 2010	(No short title)	Named a Postal Service building in Harrison, New Jersey for Patricia McGinty-Juhl
111-133	January 29, 2010	(No short title)	Named a Postal Service building in White Springs, Florida for Clyde Hillhouse
111-134	January 29, 2010	(No short title)	Named a Postal Service building in Smithfield, Utah for W. Hazen Hillyard
111-135	January 29, 2010	(No short title)	Named a Postal Service building in Stow, Ohio for Joseph Tomci
111-136	January 29, 2010	(No short title)	Extended certain small business programs through April 30, 2010
111-137	February 1, 2010	(No short title)	Authorized the Department of Veterans Affairs to reimburse eligible veterans for emergency care at non-Veterans Affairs medical facilities
111-138	February 1, 2010	(No short title)	Allows government claims to documents related to Franklin D. Roosevelt to be dropped once they are gifted to the National Archives and Records Administration
111-139	February 12, 2010	(No short title)	Raised the public debt limit and restored "pay-as-you-go" (see: Statutory Pay-As-You-Go Act of 2010) and resolved to eliminate wasteful spending
111-140	February 16, 2010	Nuclear Forensics and Attribution Act	Expanded the Department of Homeland Security's ability secure nuclear material and employ nuclear attribution techniques
111-141	February 27, 2010	(No short title)	Extended certain provisions of the USA PATRIOT Improvement and Reauthorization Act of 2005 and Intelligence Reform and Terrorism Prevention Act of 2004 until February 28, 2011
111-142	February 27, 2010	Social Security Disability Applicants' Access to Professional Representation Act of 2010	Extended the attorney fee withholding procedures of the Social Security Act for attorneys and non-attorney representatives
111-143	March 1, 2010	Criminal History Background Checks Pilot Extension Act of 2009	Extended the pilot program for volunteer groups to obtain criminal history background checks
111-144	March 2, 2010	Extension Act of 2010	Extended appropriations for various programs
111-145	March 4, 2010	United States Capitol Police Administrative Technical Corrections Act of 2009	Made technical corrections to the laws affecting certain administrative authorities of the United States Capitol Police and created the Corporation for Travel Promotion (see: Travel Promotion Act of 2009)
111-146	March 17, 2010	Trademark Technical and Conforming Amendment Act of 2010	Made certain technical and conforming amendments to the trademark laws
111-147	March 18, 2010	Commerce, Justice, Science, and Related Agencies Appropriations Act 2010 (Division A)	Extended appropriations for various programs
111-147	March 18, 2010	Statutory Pay-As-You-Go Act of 2009 (Division B)	Reestablished "pay-as-you-go"
111-148	March 23, 2010	Patient Protection and Affordable Care Act	Provided for comprehensive health care reform
111-149	March 25, 2010	(No short title)	Amended the North American Wetlands Conservation Act to restrict federal grants from being used for certain payments
111-150	March 26, 2010	(No short title)	Extended certain small business programs through April 30, 2010
111-151	March 26, 2010	Satellite Television Extension Act of 2010	Extended certain provisions of the Satellite Home Viewer Improvement Act of 1999
111-152	March 30, 2010	Health Care and Education Reconciliation Act of 2010	Provided for comprehensive health care reform and changed the method in which Pell Grants are issued (see: Student Aid and Fiscal Responsibility Act)
111-153	March 31, 2010	Federal Aviation Administration Extension Act of 2010	Extended certain aviation programs
111-154	March 31, 2010	Prevent All Cigarette Trafficking Act of 2009	Strengthened regulations regarding the taxation, smuggling, and interstate shipping of tobacco
111-155	April 7, 2010	Prevent Deceptive Census Look Alike Mailings Act	Prohibited the distribution of mail that bears a resemblance to 2010 Census forms
111-156	April 7, 2010	(No short title)	Recognized the achievement of the Blinded Veterans Association
111-157	April 15, 2010	Continuing Extension Act of 2010	Extended various programs
111-158	April 26, 2010	Haiti Debt Relief and Earthquake Recovery Act of 2010	Urged the Department of the Treasury, the International Monetary Fund, the World Bank, the Inter-American Development Bank, and other institutions to cancel Haitian government debt owned by the United States
111-159	April 26, 2010	TRICARE Affirmation Act	Amended the Internal Revenue Code to classify health coverage provided by the Department of Defense as "minimal essential coverage"
111-160	April 26, 2010	(No short title)	Granted the consent and approval of Congress to amendments made to the Washington Metropolitan Area Transit Regulation Compact between the District of Columbia, Maryland, and Virginia
111-161	April 30, 2010	Airport and Airway Extension Act of 2010	Extended the Airport and Airway Trust Fund and other programs
111-162	April 30, 2010	(No short title)	Extended certain small business programs through July 31, 2010
111-163	May 5, 2010	Caregivers and Veterans Omnibus Health Services Act of 2010	Expanded benefits to veterans
111-164	May 7, 2010	(No short title)	Named a Department of Veterans Affairs rehabilitation center for the blind in Long Beach, California after Charles Soltes
111-165	May 14, 2010	(No short title)	Prevented cost of living adjustments for members of Congress during the 2011 fiscal year
111-166	May 17, 2010	Daniel Pearl Freedom of the Press Act of 2009	Amends the Foreign Assistance Act of 1961 to add section on the freedom of the press in the annual Country Reports on Human Rights Practices
111-167	May 24, 2010	Blue Ridge Parkway and Town of Blowing Rock Land Exchange Act of 2009	Allowed for a land exchange between the Town of Blowing Rock, North Carolina and the Department of the Interior so that land can be incorporated into the Blue Ridge Parkway
111-168	May 24, 2010	(No short title)	Provided for the sale of reversionary interest on land used as a cemetery in Salt Lake City, Utah
111-169	May 24, 2010	(No short title)	Extended the mandate of the Adams Memorial Foundation through December 2, 2013
111-170	May 24, 2010	(No short title)	Clarified the instances in which the word "census" can appear on mail
111-171	May 24, 2010	Haiti Economic Lift Program Act of 2010	Extended the Caribbean Basin Economic Recovery Act of 1983 though September 30, 2020 and made other changes related to Haiti-related aid
111-172	May 24, 2010	Lord's Resistance Army Disarmament and Northern Uganda Recovery Act of 2009	Established a policy of assistance and support for Uganda
111-173	May 27, 2010	(No short title)	Clarified the status of health care provided by the Department of Veterans Affairs in light of the Patient Protection and Affordable Care Act
111-174	May 27, 2010	Federal Judiciary Administrative Improvements Act of 2010	Made various administrative modification to the federal courts system
111-175	May 27, 2010	Satellite Television Extension and Localism Act of 2010	Renewed laws that govern the retransmission of broadcast television content by satellite companies
111-176	June 8, 2010	(No short title)	Named the Main Interior Building in Washington, D.C. after Stewart Udall
111-177	June 8, 2010	Extending Immunities to the Office of the High Representative and the International Civilian Office in Kosovo Act of 2010	Extended the International Organizations Immunities Act to the offices of the High Representative for Bosnia and Herzegovina and the International Civilian Representative for Kosovo
111-178	June 9, 2010	Special Agent Samuel Hicks Families of Fallen Heroes Act	Allowed federal law enforcement agencies to cover the transportation and moving expenses of the family of agents who die performing their function
111-179	June 9, 2010	(No short title)	Named a Postal Service building in Riverhead, New York for Garfield Langhorn
111-180	June 9, 2010	(No short title)	Named a Postal Service building in Swifton, Arkansas for George Kell
111-181	June 9, 2010	(No short title)	Named a Postal Service building in Roper, North Carolina for E. V. Wilkins
111-182	June 9, 2010	(No short title)	Named a Postal Service building in Shrewsbury, Massachusetts for Ann Marie Blute
111-183	June 9, 2010	(No short title)	Named a Postal Service building in Overland Park, Kansas for Jan Meyers
111-184	June 9, 2010	(No short title)	Named a Postal Service building in Hickory, Mississippi for Matthew Ingram
111-185	June 9, 2010	(No short title)	Named a Postal Service building in Palm Desert, California for Roy Wilson
111-186	June 9, 2010	(No short title)	Named a Postal Service building in Greeley, Colorado for W. D. Farr
111-187	June 9, 2010	(No short title)	Named a Postal Service building in North Troy, New York for Martin Maher
111-188	June 9, 2010	(No short title)	Named a Postal Service building in Cheyney, Pennsylvania for Luther Smith
111-189	June 9, 2010	(No short title)	Named a Postal Service building in Westwood, New Jersey for Christopher Hrbek
111-190	June 9, 2010	(No short title)	Extended some provisions of the Antitrust Criminal Penalty Enhancement and Reform Act of 2004 through 2020 and directed the Comptroller General to submit a report regarding the effectiveness of the act within a year
111-191	June 15, 2010	(No short title)	Amended the Oil Pollution Act of 1990 with regard to the Deepwater Horizon oil spill
111-192	June 25, 2010	Preservation of Access to Care for Medicare Beneficiaries and Pension Relief Act of 2010	Made various amendments related to changes in payments under Medicare
111-193	June 28, 2010	(No short title)	Named a Postal Service building in New Orleans for Roy Rondeno
111-194	June 30, 2010	(No short title)	Provided for a constitutional convention in the United States Virgin Islands
111-195	July 1, 2010	Comprehensive Iran Sanctions, Accountability, and Divestment Act of 2010	Expanded economic sanctions against companies and individual who work with certain Iran industries
111-196	July 2, 2010	National Flood Insurance Program Extension Act of 2010	Extended the National Flood Insurance Program through to September 30, 2010
111-197	July 2, 2010	Airport and Airway Extension Act of 2010, Part II	Made various modification to aeronautics-related grants and taxes
111-198	July 2, 2010	Homebuyer Assistance and Improvement Act of 2010	Made various tax-related changes and extended unrelated provisions of the Immigration and Nationality Act and the Travel Promotion Act of 2009
111-199	July 7, 2010	Formaldehyde Standards for Composite Wood Products Act	Amended the Toxic Substances Control Act of 1976 to reduce the amount of formaldehyde in composite wood products
111-200	July 7, 2010	Congressional Award Program Reauthorization Act of 2009	Reauthorized the Congressional Award program until October 1, 2013
111-201	July 7, 2010	(No short title)	Acknowledged the 60th anniversary of the Korean War and reaffirmed the United States' alliance with South Korea
111-202	July 13, 2010	(No short title)	Amended the United States International Broadcasting Act to permanently authorize Radio Free Asia
111-203	July 21, 2010	Dodd-Frank Wall Street Reform and Consumer Protection Act	Provided for comprehensive financial regulatory reform, specifically with response to the Late-2000s recession
111-204	July 22, 2010	Improper Payments Elimination and Recovery Act of 2010	Strengthened regulations concerning the payment of government funds to contractors
111-205	July 22, 2010	Unemployment Compensation Extension Act of 2010	Extended certain unemployment benefits
111-206	July 27, 2010	Shasta-Trinity National Forest Administrative Jurisdiction Transfer Act	Transferred the administration of part of Shasta-Trinity National Forest from the Forest Service to the Bureau of Land Management
111-207	July 27, 2010	Cruise Vessel Security and Safety Act of 2010	Provides for various safety requirements on cruise ships
111-208	July 27, 2010	(No short title)	Named a Postal Service building in Columbus, Ohio for Clarence Lumpkin
111-209	July 27, 2010	(No short title)	Amended an effective date in the Credit CARD Act of 2009
111-210	July 27, 2010	(No short title)	Renewed restrictions imposed by the Burmese Freedom and Democracy Act of 2003 and made minor amendments to the Consolidated Omnibus Budget Reconciliation Act of 1985, the Hiring Incentives to Restore Employment Act and the Statutory Pay-As-You-Go Act of 2010
111-211	July 29, 2010	Indian Arts and Crafts Amendments Act of 2010	Allowed the Indian Arts and Crafts Board to initiate civil and criminal under the Indian Arts and Crafts Act of 1990 and incorporated the Tribal Law and Order Act of 2010, making a number of changes to law enforcement and coordination in Tribal areas.
111-212	July 29, 2010	Supplemental Appropriations Act, 2010	Made appropriations related to the wars in Iraq and Afghanistan, disaster relief, and Pell Grants
111-213	July 29, 2010	Independent Living Centers Technical Adjustment Act	Set rules regarding awarding and distribution of funds under the Rehabilitation Act of 1973
111-214	July 29, 2010	(No short title)	Extended certain small business programs through September 30, 2010
111-215	July 29, 2010	(No short title)	Extended the period for which the Environmental Protection Agency and individual states can require a permit for certain environmental discharges from vessels
111-216	August 1, 2010	Airline Safety and Federal Aviation Administration Extension Act of 2010	Extended funding for various aviation programs
111-217	August 3, 2010	(No short title)	Named a Postal Service building in Chicago for Steve Goodman
111-218	August 3, 2010	(No short title)	Named a Postal Service building in Hornell, New York for Zachary Smith
111-219	August 3, 2010	(No short title)	Named a Postal Service building in Sharon, Massachusetts for Michael Rothberg
111-220	August 3, 2010	Fair Sentencing Act of 2010	Reduced penalties for the possession of cocaine
111-221	August 6, 2010	National September 11 Memorial & Museum Commemorative Medal Act of 2010	Authorized the minting of medals that commemorate both the 10th anniversary of the September 11 attacks and the establishment of the National September 11 Memorial & Museum at the World Trade Center
111-222	August 6, 2010	(No short title)	To amend the National Law Enforcement Museum Act to extend the termination date
111-223	August 10, 2010	Securing the Protection of our Enduring and Established Constitutional Heritage Act	Prohibited recognition and enforcement of foreign defamation judgments and certain foreign judgments against the providers of interactive computer services
111-224	August 10, 2010	United States Patent and Trademark Office Supplemental Appropriations Act, 2010	Made supplemental appropriations for the United States Patent and Trademark Office for the fiscal year ending September 30, 2010
111-225	August 10, 2010	Cell Phone Contraband Act of 2010	Prohibited the possession or use of cell phones and similar wireless devices by Federal prisoners
111-226	August 10, 2010	(No short title)	Provided fundings for education and Medicaid, and made a number of rescissions
111-227	August 11, 2010	United States Manufacturing Enhancement Act of 2010	Made various changes to custom tariffs and minor tax amendments
111-228	August 11, 2010	General and Special Risk Insurance Funds Availability Act of 2010	Allowed the Secretary of Housing and Urban Development to guarantee loans that are obligations of the General and Special Risk Insurance Funds
111-229	August 11, 2010	(No short title)	Gave the Secretary of Housing and Urban Development more flexibility regarding FHA mortgage insurance
111-230	August 13, 2010	(No short title)	Made appropriations for border security
111-231	August 16, 2010	(No short title)	Related to USDA easements in Caseyville, Illinois
111-232	August 16, 2010	Star-Spangled Banner Commemorative Coin Act	Required the Secretary of the Treasury to mint coins in commemoration of the bicentennial of the writing of the Star-Spangled Banner
111-233	August 16, 2010	Agricultural Credit Act of 2010	Reauthorized State agricultural mediation programs under title V of the Agricultural Credit Act of 1987
111-234	August 16, 2010	(No short title)	Named a federal court building in Atlanta, Georgia for John Cooper Godbold
111-235	August 16, 2010	(No short title)	Named a Postal Service building in Dixon, Illinois for Ronald Reagan
111-236	August 16, 2010	(No short title)	Named a Postal Service building in Maitland, Florida for Paula Hawkins
111-237	August 16, 2010	Firearms Excise Tax Improvement Act of 2010	Amended the tax code to make excise taxes on recreational equipment payable quarterly, and to allow for certain orders of restitution to be treated like delinquent taxes
111-238	September 27, 2010	(No short title)	Made amendments to the National Defense Authorization Act for Fiscal Year 2010 relating to multi-year contracts
111-239	September 27, 2010	Mandatory Price Reporting Act of 2010	Added to the Agricultural Marketing Act of 1946 or extended requirements for reporting in livestocks, wholesale pork cuts and dairy products
111-240	September 27, 2010	Small Business Jobs Act of 2010	Created the Small Business Lending Fund Program and State Small Business Credit Initiative, funded tax cuts to small business and provided for exportation assistance mostly to small businesses
111-241	September 30, 2010	Multinational Species Conservation Funds Semipostal Stamp Act of 2010	Mandated the issue and sales of a stamp to help funding the Multinational Species Conservation Funds
111-242	September 30, 2010	Continuing Appropriations Act, 2011	Appropriated amounts for continuing operations conducted in 2010, extended dates and programs, and included various earmarks
111-243	September 30, 2010	(No short title)	Named a federal building in Jackson, Mississippi for James Chaney, Andrew Goodman, Michael Schwerner, and Roy K. Moore
111-244	September 30, 2010	(No short title)	Clarified intent for use of funds for political status education in Guam and denied minimum wage increases to the Northern Mariana Islands and American Samoa
111-245	September 30, 2010	First Responder Anti-Terrorism Training Resources Act	Authorized acceptance under certain circumstances of gifts of property and services to the Center for Domestic Preparedness and the Federal Law Enforcement Training Center
111-246	September 30, 2010	(No short title)	Allowed provision of state home nursing care to parents of Army personnel deceased in service
111-247	September 30, 2010	Veterans' Compensation Cost-of-Living Adjustment Act of 2010	Provided a cost of living increase in compensation for disabled military veterans
111-248	September 30, 2010	(No short title)	Made a number of minor changes to the operation and budgeting of congressional facilities
111-249	September 30, 2010	Airport and Airway Extension Act of 2010, Part III	Extended various aviation-related authorizations and programs
111-250	September 30, 2010	National Flood Insurance Program Reextension Act of 2010	Extended the National Flood Insurance Program through September 2011
111-251	September 30, 2010	(No short title)	Extended all programs under the Small Business Act and the Small Business Investment Act of 1958 for a year
111-252	October 5, 2010	(No short title)	Provided for some U.S. Customs and Border Protection oversea employees to be converted to permanent employment
111-253	October 5, 2010	(No short title)	Awarded a Congressional Gold Medal to Muhammad Yunus
111-254	October 5, 2010	(No short title)	Awarded a collective Congressional Gold Medal to the 100th Infantry Battalion, the 442nd Regimental Combat Team, and the Military Intelligence Service
111-255	October 5, 2010	Improving Access to Clinical Trials Act of 2009	Excluded clinical trial compensation from revenue for the purpose of Medicaid and Social Security eligibility
111-256	October 5, 2010	Rosa's Law	Changed references to "mental retardation" to references to "intellectual disability" in various pieces of legislation
111-257	October 5, 2010	(No short title)	Repealed prohibitions in the Dodd-Frank Wall Street Reform and Consumer Protection Act against compelling some disclosures by the Securities and Exchange Commission
111-258	October 7, 2010	Reducing Over-Classification Act	Increased oversight and training with regard to classification of documents, particularly at the Department of Homeland Security
111-259	October 7, 2010	Intelligence Authorization Act for Fiscal Year 2010	To authorize appropriations for fiscal year 2010 for intelligence and intelligence-related activities of the United States Government, the Community Management Account, and the Central Intelligence Agency Retirement and Disability System, and for other purposes.
111-260	October 7, 2010	Twenty-First Century Communications and Video Accessibility Act of 2010	Enacted a number of provisions requiring equipment to include internal means for use by the fully or partially deaf, blind or mute
111-261	October 7, 2010	(No short title)	Authorized the Secretary of the Interior to lease certain lands in Virgin Islands National Park
111-262	October 8, 2010	5-Star Generals Commemorative Coin Act	Required the Secretary of the Treasury to mint coins in recognition of five United States Army 5-Star Generals, George Marshall, Douglas MacArthur, Dwight Eisenhower, Henry `Hap' Arnold, and Omar Bradley to coincide with the celebration of the 132nd Anniversary of the founding of the United States Army Command and General Staff College
111-263	October 8, 2010	Federal Supply Schedules Usage Act of 2010	Provided increased access to the Federal supply schedules of the General Services Administration to the American Red Cross, other qualified organizations, and State and local governments
111-264	October 8, 2010	Stem Cell Therapeutic and Research Reauthorization Act of 2010	Amended the Stem Cell Therapeutic and Research Act of 2005
111-265	October 8, 2010	(No short title)	Made technical corrections in the Twenty-First Century Communications and Video Accessibility Act of 2010 and the amendments made by that Act
111-266	October 7, 2010	Security Cooperation Act of 2010	Implemented certain defense trade cooperation treaties
111-267	October 11, 2010	National Aeronautics and Space Administration Authorization Act of 2010	Authorized the programs of the National Aeronautics and Space Administration for fiscal years 2011 through 2013
111-268	October 12, 2010	Combat Methamphetamine Enhancement Act of 2010	Enhanced the law enforcement's ability to combat methamphetamine
111-269	October 12, 2010	Indian Veterans Housing Opportunity Act of 2010	Excluded from consideration as income under the Native American Housing Assistance and Self-Determination Act of 1996 amounts received by a family from the Department of Veterans Affairs for service-related disabilities of a member of the family
111-270	October 12, 2010	(No short title)	Provided for an extension of the legislative authority of the Vietnam Veterans Memorial Fund, Inc. to establish a Vietnam Veterans Memorial visitor center
111-271	October 12, 2010	Redundancy Elimination and Enhanced Performance for Preparedness Grants Act	Provided for identifying and eliminating redundant reporting requirements and developing meaningful performance metrics for homeland security preparedness grants
111-272	October 12, 2010	Law Enforcement Officers Safety Act Improvements Act of 201	Amended title 18 of the United States Code, to improve the provisions relating to the carrying of concealed weapons by law enforcement officers
111-273	October 12, 2010	Secure and Responsible Drug Disposal Act of 2010	Amended the Controlled Substances Act to provide for take-back disposal of controlled substances in certain instances
111-274	October 13, 2010	Plain Writing Act of 2010	Established that Government documents issued to the public must be written clearly
111-275	October 13, 2010	Veterans' Benefits Act of 2010	Implemented a number of new veterans' benefits and assistance services
111-276	October 13, 2010	(No short title)	Named a Postal Service building in San Jose, California for Anthony J. Cortese
111-277	October 13, 2010	(No short title)	Named a Postal Service building in Brighton, Michigan for Joyce Rogers
111-278	October 13, 2010	(No short title)	Named a Postal Service building in Cleveland, Ohio for David John Donafee
111-279	October 13, 2010	(No short title)	Named a Postal Service building in Los Angeles for Tom Bradley
111-280	October 13, 2010	WIPA and PABSS Extension Act of 2010	Extended the authorizations for the Work Incentives Planning and Assistance program and the Protection and Advocacy for Beneficiaries of Social Security program for one year
111-281	October 15, 2010	Coast Guard Authorization Act of 2010	Authorized appropriations for the Coast Guard for fiscal year 2011
111-282	October 15, 2010	United States Secret Service Uniformed Division Modernization Act of 2010	Transferred statutory entitlements to pay and hours of work authorized by laws codified in the District of Columbia Official Code for current members of the United States Secret Service Uniformed Division from such laws to the United States Code
111-283	October 15, 2010	Pre-Election Presidential Transition Act of 2010	Amended the Presidential Transition Act of 1963 to provide that certain transition services shall be available to eligible candidates before the general election
111-284	October 18, 2010	Mount Stevens and Ted Stevens Icefield Designation Act	Named a mountain and icefield in the State of Alaska as the "Mount Stevens" and "Ted Stevens Icefield", respectively
111-285	October 24, 2010	(No short title)	Extended the deadline for Social Services Block Grant expenditures of supplemental funds appropriated following disasters occurring in 2008
111-286	October 30, 2010	The Physician Payment and Therapy Relief Act of 2010	Extended a physician payment update through December 2010 and changed the reduction for certain multiple therapy services
111-287	October 30, 2010	International Adoption Simplification Act	Restored immunization and sibling age exemptions for children adopted by United States citizens under the Hague Convention on Intercountry Adoption to allow their admission into the United States
111-288	October 30, 2010	(No short title)	Named a Postal Service building in Lynbrook, New York for Navy Corpsman Jeffrey L. Wiener
111-289	October 30, 2010	(No short title)	Appointed January 5, 2011, as the day for the first session of the 112th Congress to convene
111-290	December 4, 2010	(No short title)	Extended the Continuing Appropriations Act, 2010 through December 18, 2010
111-291	December 8, 2010	Claims Resolution Act of 2010	Authorized payment of legal settlements in seven lawsuits
111-292	December 9, 2010	Telework Enhancement Act of 2010	Required the head of each executive agency to establish and implement a policy to authorize employees to telework
111-293	December 9, 2010	Help HAITI Act of 2010	Provided for adjustment of status for certain Haitian orphans paroled into the United States after the earthquake of January 12, 2010
111-294	December 9, 2010	Animal Crush Video Prohibition Act of 2010	Prohibited interstate commerce in animal crush videos
111-295	December 9, 2010	Copyright Cleanup, Clarification, and Corrections Act of 2010	Increased use of electronic communication at the Copyright Office, eliminated the Manufacturing clause, explicitly applied the phonorecord exemption to all pre-1978 records, subjected Copyright Royalty Judges to judicial review, and corrected various minor typos
111-296	December 13, 2010	Healthy, Hunger-Free Kids Act of 2010	Reauthorized child nutrition programs, updated their nutrition standards, and increased their access and monitoring
111-297	December 14, 2010	(No short title)	Named a federal building in Pensacola, Florida for Winston E. Arnow
111-298	December 14, 2010	(No short title)	Named a federal building and courthouse in Rapid City, South Dakota for Andrew W. Bogue
111-299	December 14, 2010	(No short title)	Named the Government Printing Office building in Pueblo, Colorado used by the Federal Citizen Information Center for Frank Evans
111-300	December 14, 2010	(No short title)	Named a Postal Service building in Fall River, Massachusetts for Sergeant Robert Barrett
111-301	December 14, 2010	(No short title)	Renamed the Social Security Administration Operations Building after former commissioner Robert M. Ball
111-302	December 14, 2010	Coin Modernization, Oversight, and Continuity Act of 2010	Required biennial reports on possible methods to reduce coinage production costs and prevents the Secretary from making recommendation that would require changes in coin-operated equipment
111-303	December 14, 2010	American Eagle Palladium Bullion Coin Act of 2010	Authorized the minting of a new palladium bullion coin
111-304	December 14, 2010	(No short title)	Named a Postal Service building in Napa, California for Tom Kongsgaard
111-305	December 14, 2010	(No short title)	Named a Postal Service building in Eureka, California for Sam Sacco
111-306	December 14, 2010	(No short title)	Required foreign students wishing to study at a language training program do so in one that has been accredited by the Secretary of Education
111-307	December 14, 2010	Asian Carp Prevention and Control Act	Added the Asian Carp to species that cannot be imported to the U.S. under the Lacey Act of 1900
111-308	December 14, 2010	Federal Buildings Personnel Training Act of 2010	Enacted training requirements for federal personnel performing building operations and maintenance
111-309	December 15, 2010	Medicare and Medicaid Extenders Act of 2010	Enacted a number of Medicaid- and Medicare-related extensions and administrative changes
111-310	December 15, 2010	(No short title)	Named a Postal Service building in Washington, D.C. for Dorothy Height
111-311	December 15, 2010	CALM Act	Directed the Federal Communications Commission (FCC) to regulate the volume of television advertisements
111-312	December 17, 2010	Tax Relief, Unemployment Insurance Reauthorization, and Job Creation Act of 2010	Extended Middle-Class tax cuts and tax cuts for the wealthy, while extending unemployment insurance and supplying a payroll tax credit
111-313	December 18, 2010	Truth in Fur Labeling Act of 2010	Made changes to exemptions under the Fur Products Labeling Act
111-314	December 18, 2010	(No short title)	Codified the existing National Aeronautics and Space Act and the new Charles "Pete" Conrad Astronomy Awards Act as Title 51 of the United States Code
111-315	December 18, 2010	(No short title)	Made changes to the Water Resources Development Act of 2000 regarding non-federal public entities
111-316	December 18, 2010	(No short title)	Made minor administrative changes regarding the Office of the Architect of the Capitol
111-317	December 18, 2010	(No short title)	Extended the Continuing Appropriations Act, 2010 through December 21, 2010
111-318	December 18, 2010	Social Security Number Protection Act of 2010	Limits access to Social Security numbers
111-319	December 18, 2010	Red Flag Program Clarification Act of 2010	Amended the Fair Credit Reporting Act with respect to the applicability of identity theft guidelines to creditors
111-320	December 20, 2010	CAPTA Reauthorization Act of 2010	Reauthorizes the Child Abuse Prevention and Treatment Act, the Family Violence Prevention and Services Act, the Child Abuse Prevention and Treatment and Adoption Reform Act of 1978, and the Abandoned Infants Assistance Act of 1988
111-321	December 22, 2010	Don't Ask, Don't Tell Repeal Act of 2010	Repealed Don't Ask, Don't Tell, which had prohibited openly homosexual or bisexual individuals from serving in the United States Armed Forces
111-322	December 22, 2010	Continuing Appropriations and Surface Transportation Extensions Act, 2011	Title 1: Continuing Appropriations Amendment, 2011: Amended the Continuing Appropriations Act, 2010 by, among other things, extending appropriations through March 4, 2011; freezing pay for certain executive branch employees; and extending authorization for certain programs Title 2: Surface Transportation Extension Act of 2010: Extended funding for various highway programs through March 4, 2011
111-323	December 22, 2010	Hoh Indian Tribe Safe Homelands Act	Transferred certain land to the United States to be held in trust for the Hoh Indian Tribe
111-324	December 22, 2010	(No short title)	Reauthorized and enhanced Johanna's Law to increase public awareness and knowledge with respect to gynecologic cancers
111-325	December 22, 2010	Regulated Investment Company Modernization Act of 2010	Amended the Internal Revenue Code of 1986 to modify certain rules applicable to regulated investment companies
111-326	December 22, 2010	(No short title)	Named the traffic control tower at Spokane International Airport in Spokane, Washington for Roy Daves
111-327	December 22, 2010	Bankruptcy Technical Corrections Act of 2010	Made technical corrections to Title 11 of the United States Code
111-328	December 22, 2010	Kingman and Heritage Islands Act of 2010	Amended the National Children's Island Act of 1995 to expand allowable uses for Kingman and Heritage Islands by the District of Columbia
111-329	December 22, 2010	Airport and Airway Extension Act of 2010, Part IV	Amended the Internal Revenue Code of 1986 to extend the funding and expenditure authority of the Airport and Airway Trust Fund and to amend title 49 of the United States Code, to extend the airport improvement program
111-330	December 22, 2010	(No short title)	Made technical corrections to the Coast Guard Authorization Act of 2010
111-331	December 22, 2010	Truth in Caller ID Act of 2009	Amended the Communications Act of 1934 to prohibit manipulation of caller identification information
111-332	December 22, 2010	National Foundation on Fitness, Sports, and Nutrition Establishment Act	Established a National Foundation on Physical Fitness and Sports to carry out activities to support and supplement the mission of the President's Council on Physical Fitness and Sports
111-333	December 22, 2010	Longfellow House-Washington's Headquarters National Historic Site Designation Act	Redesignated the Longfellow National Historic Site, Massachusetts, as the `Longfellow House-Washington's Headquarters National Historic Site'
111-334	December 22, 2010	(No short title)	Amended the Act of August 9, 1955, to authorize the Coquille Indian Tribe, the Confederated Tribes of Siletz Indians, the Confederated Tribes of the Coos, Lower Umpqua, and Siuslaw, the Klamath Tribes, and the Burns Paiute Tribe to obtain 99-year lease authority for trust land
111-335	December 22, 2010	Longline Catcher Processor Subsector Single Fishery Cooperative Act	Authorized a single fisheries cooperative for the Bering Sea Aleutian Islands longline catcher processor subsector
111-336	December 22, 2010	(No short title)	Amended 25 U.S.C. § 415 to modify a provision relating to leases involving certain Indian tribes
111-337	December 22, 2010	Early Hearing Detection and Intervention Act of 2010	Amended the Public Health Service Act regarding early detection, diagnosis, and treatment of hearing loss
111-338	December 22, 2010	FOR VETS Act of 2010	Amended chapter 5 of title 40, United States Code, to include organizations whose membership comprises substantially veterans as recipient organizations for the donation of federal surplus personal property through state agencies
111-339	December 22, 2010	(No short title)	Required reports on the management of Arlington National Cemetery
111-340	December 22, 2010	Museum and Library Services Act of 2010	Amended and extended the Museum and Library Services Act, and for other purposes
111-341	December 22, 2010	Criminal History Background Checks Pilot Extension Act of 2010	Extended the Child Safety Pilot Program
111-342	December 22, 2010	Preserving Foreign Criminal Assets for Forfeiture Act of 2010	Amended title 28, United States Code, to prevent the proceeds or instrumentalities of foreign crime located in the United States from being shielded from foreign forfeiture proceedings
111-343	December 29, 2010	(No short title)	Required the Federal Deposit Insurance Corporation to fully insure Interest on Lawyer Trust Accounts
111-344	December 29, 2010	Omnibus Trade Act of 2010	Extended trade adjustment assistance and certain trade preference programs and amended the Harmonized Tariff Schedule of the United States to modify temporarily certain rates of duty
111-345	December 29, 2010	Restore Online Shoppers' Confidence Act	Protected consumers from certain aggressive sales tactics on the Internet
111-346	December 29, 2010	Helping Heroes Keep Their Homes Act of 2010	Extended certain expiring provisions providing enhanced protections for servicemembers relating to mortgages and mortgage foreclosure
111-347	January 2, 2011	James Zadroga 9/11 Health and Compensation Act of 2010	Amended the Public Health Service Act to extend and improve protections and services to individuals directly impacted by the terrorist attack in New York City on September 11, 2001
111-348	January 4, 2011	Shark Conservation Act of 2010	Amended the High Seas Driftnet Fishing Moratorium Protection Act and the Magnuson-Stevens Fishery Conservation and Management Act to improve the conservation of sharks
111-349	January 4, 2011	(No short title)	Established a pilot program in certain United States district courts to encourage enhancement of expertise in patent cases among district judges
111-350	January 4, 2011	(No short title)	Enacted Title 41 of the United States Code (Public Contracts) as positive law
111-351	January 4, 2011	Predisaster Hazard Mitigation Act of 2010	Amended the Robert T. Stafford Disaster Relief and Emergency Assistance Act to reauthorize the pre-disaster mitigation program of the Federal Emergency Management Agency
111-352	January 4, 2011	GPRA Modernization Act of 2010	Required quarterly performance assessments of government programs for purposes of assessing agency performance and improvement, and established agency performance improvement officers and the Performance Improvement Council
111-353	January 4, 2011	FDA Food Safety Modernization Act	Amended the Federal Food, Drug, and Cosmetic Act with respect to the safety of the food supply
111-354	January 4, 2011	Indian Pueblo Cultural Center Clarification Act	Repealed a restriction in Public Law 95-232 on treating as Indian country certain lands held in trust for Indian pueblos in New Mexico
111-355	January 4, 2011	(No short title)	Named a Postal Service building in Sharon Center, Ohio for Emil Bolas
111-356	January 4, 2011	Northern Border Counternarcotics Strategy Act of 2010	Amended the Office of National Drug Control Policy Reauthorization Act of 2006 to require a northern border counternarcotics strategy
111-357	January 4, 2011	National Wildlife Refuge Volunteer Improvement Act of 2010	Amended the Fish and Wildlife Act of 1956 to reauthorize volunteer programs and community partnerships for national wildlife refuges
111-358	January 4, 2011	America COMPETES Reauthorization Act of 2010	Funded research and development to improve the competitiveness of the United States
111-359	January 4, 2011	(No short title)	Named a Postal Service building in Carlstadt, New Jersey for Staff Sergeant Frank T. Carvill and Lance Corporal Michael A. Schwarz
111-360	January 4, 2011	(No short title)	Excluded an external power supply for certain security or life safety alarms and surveillance system components from the application of certain energy efficiency standards under the Energy Policy and Conservation Act
111-361	January 4, 2011	(No short title)	Named a Postal Service building in Uniontown, Pennsylvania for George C. Marshall
111-362	January 4, 2011	(No short title)	Named a Postal Service building in Indiana, Pennsylvania for Jimmy Stewart
111-363	January 4, 2011	(No short title)	Named a Postal Service building in Miami, Florida for Jesse J. McCrary Jr.
111-364	January 4, 2011	Diesel Emissions Reduction Act of 2010	Amended the Energy Policy Act of 2005 to reauthorize and modify provisions relating to the diesel emissions reduction program
111-365	January 4, 2011	(No short title)	Named a Postal Service building in Jamaica Plain, Massachusetts for Lance Corporal Alexander Scott Arredondo
111-366	January 4, 2011	(No short title)	Amended the Internal Revenue Code of 1986 to authorize the Tax Court to appoint employees
111-367	January 4, 2011	(No short title)	Named a Postal Service building in Centreville, Virginia for Colonel George Juskalian
111-368	January 4, 2011	(No short title)	Named a Postal Service building in St. Louis, Missouri for Earl Wilson Jr.
111-369	January 4, 2011	Access to Criminal History Records for State Sentencing Commissions Act of 2010	Amended title 28 of the United States Code, to require the Attorney General to share criminal records with state sentencing commissions
111-370	January 4, 2011	(No short title)	Directed the Administrator of General Services to convey a parcel of real property in Houston, Texas, to the Military Museum of Texas
111-371	January 4, 2011	Local Community Radio Act of 2010	Implemented the recommendations of the Federal Communications Commission report to the Congress regarding low-power FM service
111-372	January 4, 2011	Supportive Housing for the Elderly Act of 2010	Amend section 202 of the Housing Act of 1959 to improve the program for supportive housing for the elderly
111-373	January 4, 2011	Pedestrian Safety Enhancement Act of 2010	Directed the Secretary of Transportation to study and establish a motor vehicle safety standard that provides for a means of alerting blind and other pedestrians of motor vehicle operation
111-374	January 4, 2011	Frank Melville Supportive Housing Investment Act of 2010	Amended section 811 of the Cranston-Gonzalez National Affordable Housing Act to improve the program for supportive housing for persons with disabilities
111-375	January 4, 2011	National Alzheimer's Project Act	Established the National Alzheimer's Project
111-376	January 4, 2011	Anti-Border Corruption Act of 2010	Required U.S. Customs and Border Protection to administer polygraph examinations to all applicants for its law enforcement positions and required it to initiate all periodic background reinvestigations of certain law enforcement personnel
111-377	January 4, 2011	Post-9/11 Veterans Educational Assistance Improvements Act of 2010	Amended title 38 of the United States Code, to improve educational assistance for veterans who served in the Armed Forces after September 11, 2001
111-378	January 4, 2011	(No short title)	Amend the Federal Water Pollution Control Act to clarify federal responsibility for stormwater pollution
111-379	January 4, 2011	(No short title)	Named a Postal Service building in Tyrone, Georgia for First Lieutenant Robert Wilson Collins
111-380	January 4, 2011	Reduction of Lead in Drinking Water Act	Amended the Safe Drinking Water Act to reduce lead in drinking water
111-381	January 4, 2011	(No short title)	Authorized leases of up to 99 years for lands held in trust for Ohkay Owingeh Pueblo
111-382	January 4, 2011	(No short title)	Clarified the National Credit Union Administration authority to make stabilization fund expenditures without borrowing from the Treasury
111-383	January 7, 2011	Ike Skelton National Defense Authorization Act for Fiscal Year 2011	To authorize appropriations for fiscal year 2011 for military activities of the Department of Defense, for military construction, and for defense activities of the Department of Energy, to prescribe military personnel strengths for such fiscal year, and for other purposes.

== Private laws ==
PL	Enacted	Description
111-1	December 22, 2010	For the relief of Shigeru Yamada (visa eligibility)
111-2	December 22, 2010	For the relief of Hotaru Nakama Ferschke (visa eligibility)

== Treaties ==
TN	Ratified	Short title	Description
Treaty 111-4	December 3, 2009	Protocol Amending Tax Convention with France	Made changes to the existing tax convention with France by reducing some withholding taxes, updating taxation procedures between the United States and France, and establishing a system of mandatory arbitration
Treaty 111-1	July 15, 2010	Tax Convention with Malta	Established a tax convention with Malta to avoid double taxation, reduce some withholding taxes, prevent fiscal evasion with respect to income taxes, and establish a framework for taxation cooperation
Treaty 111-3	July 15, 2010	Protocol Amending Tax Convention with New Zealand	Made changes to the existing tax convention with New Zealand to avoid double taxation and to prevent fiscal evasion with respect to income taxes
Treaty 110-7	September 29, 2010	Treaty with the United Kingdom Concerning Defense Trade Cooperation	Removed some restrictions to trading military goods with the United Kingdom
Treaty 110-10	September 29, 2010	Treaty with Australia Concerning Defense Trade Cooperation	Removed some restrictions to trading military goods with Australia
Treaty 110-21	September 29, 2010	Hague Convention on the International Recovery of Child Support and Other Forms of Family Maintenance	Established a protocol in which member states enforce the payment of child support that individuals are compelled to pay by other member states
Treaty 111-5	December 22, 2010	New START	Further extended nuclear disarmament by limiting the nuclear arsenal capabilities of both Russia and the United States and by establishing a new inspection and verification regime

== See also ==
- List of United States federal legislation
- Acts of the 110th United States Congress
- Acts of the 112th United States Congress
