= The Federal Communications Law Journal =

Federal Communications Law Journal
- Language: English

Publication details
- History: 1948–present
- Publisher: Federal Communications Bar Association

Standard abbreviations
- Bluebook: Fed. Comm. L.J.
- ISO 4: Fed. Commun. Law J.

Indexing
- ISSN: 0163-7606 (print); 2376-4457 (web)

Links
- Journal homepage

The Federal Communications Law Journal (FCLJ) is a triannual law review published by students of the George Washington University Law School. Established in 1984, the FCLJ covers communications law and is the official journal of the Federal Communications Bar Association. From 1993 to 2012, the journal was published by the Indiana University Maurer School of Law.
