= KBS1 =

South Korean public television channel

KBS 1TV
- Country: South Korea
- Network: Korean Broadcasting System

Programming
- Language: Korean
- Picture format: 2160p UHDTV (downscaled to 1080i and 480i for the HDTV and SDTV feeds respectively)

Ownership
- Owner: Korean Broadcasting System
- Sister channels: KBS2; KBS NEWS 24

History
- Launched: 31 December 1961; 64 years ago
- Former names: KBS TV (1961–1980)

Links
- Website: KBS 1TV

Availability

Terrestrial
- Digital terrestrial television: Channel 9.1

Streaming media
- KBS: Watch live (South Korea only)

KBS 1TV (Korean: KBS 제1텔레비전) is a South Korean free-to-air television channel that launched on 31 December 1961 and is owned by Korean Broadcasting System. The channel offers more serious programming than its sister channel KBS2, and airs with no commercials.

== History ==
KBS1 was not the first television channel in South Korea. DBC (Daehan Broadcasting) was established on May 12, 1956 and aired to a limited television audience. The channel was owned by the Korean RCA Distribution Company (KORCAD) and initially took on its name, as well as the call sign HLKZ TV. The station broadcast on the same frequency KBS1 would later operate on in Seoul. An audience of hundreds of viewers watched the inaugural broadcast on 32 television sets installed in street corners, 25 in newspaper buildings and on school playgrounds throughout Seoul. It was the only television station in Korea before the start of AFKN TV on September 15, 1957.

On February 2, 1959, a fire broke out at the DBC facilities, causing the station to go off the air.

The government took over the station and KBS TV started in its place on December 31, 1961, though it was initially scheduled for 1962. It was determined that KBS TV would broadcast 4 1/2 hours a day, from 6pm to 10:30pm. By 1964, it was broadcasting from 5:30pm to midnight.

In December 1962, it was announced that commercial advertising would be introduced on KBS and on Korean television as a whole from January 1, 1963, but KBS refrained from carrying commercial advertising from May 1, 1969, after a decision made three weeks earlier. As of February 1976, it also had a UHF relay station in Seoul on channel 55.

In 1980, after the shutdown of TBC and its integration with KBS, the channel was renamed KBS1. The channel absorbed most of TBC's programs, including its last drama, Daldongne. Commercial advertising was reintroduced on its networks on March 7, 1981. Commercial breaks were removed on weekdays in 1990, but the ad revenue for the channel, especially for sports broadcasts, increased. They were again removed from the channel on October 1, 1994.

Following the introduction of cable television networks in South Korea in the early 90s, KBS1 was included in the must-carry package, which initially excluded the commercial channels MBC and SBS.

KBS1 started digital terrestrial broadcasts on November 5, 2001, with the LCN fixed at 9. After government approval, KBS1 started 24-hour broadcasts on October 8, 2012.

== Programming ==
The main news programs are KBS News Plaza (morning, inherited from TBC), KBS News 12 and KBS News 9.

== Network ==
Analog network (shut down in 2012):

- Yeosu: channel 4
- Seoul: channel 5 (relay)
- Ulsan: channel 5
- Changwon: channel 6
- Daejeon: channel 6
- Jeonju: channel 7
- Daegu: channel 8
- Chuncheon: channel 8
- Seoul: channel 9 (main)
- Busan: channel 9
- Gangneung: channel 9
- Jinju: channel 10
- Cheongju: channel 10
- Wonju: channel 10
- Gwangju: channel 11
- Andong: channel 12
- Chungju: channel 12
- Jeju: channel 12
- Pohang: channel 13
- Mokpo: channel 27

== See also ==
- KBS2
- KBS News 24
- EBS1
- EBS2
