= Communications in the United States =

Communications in the United States include extensive industries and distribution networks in print and telecommunication. The primary telecom regulator of communications in the United States is the Federal Communications Commission.

== History ==
American inventors and entrepreneurs made substantial contributions to development and commercialization of the radio, telephone, and television. The Internet protocol suite was developed with U.S. government funding.

== Regulation ==
The FCC logo

The Federal Communications Commission (FCC) is an independent government agency responsible for regulating the radio, television and phone industries. The FCC regulates all interstate communications, such as wire, satellite and cable, and international communications originating or terminating in the United States.

Significant laws in the history of U.S. telecommunications include:

- Wireless Ship Act of 1910, the first radio regulations
- Mann–Elkins Act of 1910, granting the Interstate Commerce Commission the power to regulate telephones, telegraphs, and wireless telegraphs
- Radio Act of 1912, the first to require radio licenses
- Radio Act of 1927, which created the Federal Radio Commission
- Communications Act of 1934, creating the FCC and moving phone and radio regulation there
- All-Channel Receiver Act (1962), requiring that televisions include UHF and not just VHF receivers
- Public Broadcasting Act of 1967, establishing the Corporation for Public Broadcasting, which funded the creation of PBS and NPR
- Cable Television Consumer Protection and Competition Act of 1992, requiring carriage of local broadcast channels free of charge
- Cable Communications Policy Act of 1984, which gave municipalities the power to grant cable television monopolies
- Satellite Home Viewer Act (US) (1988)
- Communications Assistance for Law Enforcement Act, which required telecom providers assist the government in authorized wiretapping
- Telecommunications Act of 1996, including the Communications Decency Act
- Children's Online Privacy Protection Act (1998)
- Digital Millennium Copyright Act (1998)
- Wireless Communications and Public Safety Act (1999), updating regulations for 9-1-1

Several laws relate to unsolicited commercial communications:

- Telephone Consumer Protection Act of 1991
- CAN-SPAM Act of 2003
- Junk Fax Prevention Act of 2005
- Truth in Caller ID Act of 2009

The FCC fairness doctrine regulation was in place from 1949 to 1987.

== Press ==
The logo for The New York Times, an American newspaper.

Newspapers declined in their influence and penetration into American households in the late 20th century. Most newspapers are local, having little circulation outside their particular metropolitan area. The closest thing to a national paper the U.S. has is USA Today. Other influential dailies include The New York Times, The Washington Post and The Wall Street Journal which are sold in most U.S. cities.

The largest newspapers (by circulation) in the United States are USA Today, The Wall Street Journal, The New York Times and the Los Angeles Times.

== Mail ==
The legal monopoly of the government-owned United States Postal Service has narrowed during the 20th and 21st centuries due to competition from companies such as UPS & FedEx, although still delivers the vast majority of US mail.

== Telephone ==
In 1890, 1 percent of U.S. households owned at least one telephone while a majority did by 1946 and 75 percent did by 1957.

Telephone system:
General assessment: A large, technologically advanced, multipurpose communications system.
Domestic: A large system of fiber-optic cable, microwave radio relay, coaxial cable, and domestic satellites carries every form of telephone traffic; a rapidly growing cellular system carries mobile telephone traffic throughout the country.
International: Country code - 1; 24 ocean cable systems in use; satellite earth stations - 61 Intelsat (45 Atlantic Ocean and 16 Pacific Ocean), 5 Intersputnik (Atlantic Ocean region), and 4 Inmarsat (Pacific and Atlantic Ocean regions) (2000).

=== Landlines ===
Telephones - main lines in use: 141 million (2009)

- Most of the American telephone system was formerly operated by a single monopoly, AT&T, which was divided in 1984 into a long-distance telephone company and seven regional "Baby Bells".
- Landline telephone service continues to be divided between incumbent local exchange carriers and several competing long-distance companies. As of 2005, some of the Baby Bells are beginning to merge with long-distance phone companies. A small number of consumers are currently experimenting with Voice over Internet Protocol phone service.
- Most local loop service to homes is provided through old-fashioned copper wire, although many of the providers have upgraded the so-called "last mile" to fiber optic.
- Early in the 21st century the number of wire lines in use stopped growing and in some markets began to decline.

=== Cellular/Wireless communication ===
Telephones - mobile cellular: 286 million (2009)

- Most states have several competing cellular phone networks.
- The major cellphone companies in the U.S. are Verizon Wireless, AT&T Mobility, and T-Mobile US.

== Radio ==
In 1923, 1 percent of U.S. households owned at least one radio receiver while a majority did by 1931 and 75 percent did by 1937.

Radio broadcast stations: AM: 4,669; FM commercial stations: 6,746; FM educational stations: 4,101; FM translators & boosters: 7,253; low-power FM stations: 1,678 (as of December 31, 2016, according to the Federal Communications Commission)

- Most broadcast stations are controlled by large media conglomerates like iHeartMedia. There are also many small independent local stations. National Public Radio (NPR) is the public radio network.

Radios: 575 million (1997)

== Television ==
In 1948, 1 percent of U.S. households owned at least one television while 90 percent did by 1959. In 1980, 1 percent of U.S. households owned at least one videocassette recorder while 75 percent did by 1992. In 1975, the cable television industry had 9.8 million subscriptions across 71.1 million U.S. households (or approximately 14%), which grew to 19.2 million subscriptions across the 80.8 million households (or approximately 24%) by 1980. By 1988, cable television subscriptions grew to 45.7 million across 91.1 million households (or approximately 50%), while cable and satellite television subscriptions combined grew to 66.2 million across 99 million households (or approximately 67%) by 1995. While the number of cable television subscriptions began declining in 2001, combined cable and satellite subscriptions grew further to 90.5 million across 112 million households (or approximately 80%) by 2004, and combined subscriptions continued to grow to 95.5 million through 2007 after which combined subscriptions began falling during the Great Recession. Survey data has shown that the percentage of American adults reporting having a cable or satellite television subscription fell from 76% in 2015 to 56% in 2021, while 2025 survey data found that only 36% of American adults reported having a cable or satellite television subscription.

Television broadcast stations: 7,533 (of which 1,778 are full-power TV stations; 417 are class-A TV stations; 3,789 are TV translators; and 1,966 are other low-power TV stations) (as of December 31, 2016, according to the Federal Communications Commission); in addition, there are about 12,000 cable TV systems.

- Most local commercial television stations are owned-and-operated by or affiliated with the large national broadcast networks such as the American Broadcasting Company (ABC), CBS, the Fox Broadcasting Company (Fox), the National Broadcasting Company (NBC), and The CW Television Network. Some television networks are aimed at ethnic minorities, including Spanish-language networks Univisión and Telemundo. The Public Broadcasting Service (PBS) is the country's main public broadcasting network, with over 300 non-profit affiliated stations across the United States. Besides the large broadcast networks (which are free for anyone with a TV and an antenna), there are also many networks available only with a subscription to cable or satellite television, like CNN.

Televisions: 219 million (1997)

== Internet ==
In 1984, 8 percent of U.S. households owned at least one personal computer, while 18 percent of U.S. households had internet access in 1997. In 2000, a majority of U.S. households owned at least one personal computer and had internet access the following year, while more than 75 percent of U.S. households owned a personal computer by 2011 and had internet access by 2014. By 2021, more than 95 percent of U.S. households owned a personal computer and 90 percent had internet access.

Internet Service Providers (ISPs): 7,600 (1999 est.)

- Because of aggressive lobbying and the United States' strong libertarian traditions, the Internet service provider industry remains relatively unregulated in comparison to other communications industries.

Country code (Top level domain): US

- For various historical reasons, the .us domain was never widely used outside of a small number of government agencies and school districts. Most companies signed up for top level domains like .com instead.
- NeuStar Inc. now has control over the .us registry and is trying to promote the domain as an option for American-oriented Web sites.

== See also ==
- Big Three television networks
- Fourth television network
- List of television stations in the United States
- List of United States cable and satellite television networks
- List of United States over-the-air television networks
- List of United States television markets
