= Shva (disambiguation) =

Shva may refer to:

- Shva, a Hebrew diacritic
- SHVA (Satellite Home Viewer Act), a set of regulations which govern the transmissions of television stations in the USA
- Sheba, a kingdom mentioned in the Old Testament and the Qur'an (as pronounced in Modern Hebrew)
- Shva, or Yn, an additional letter of the Georgian alphabet
