= Media market =

Geographic area with mostly the same set of media outlets

A media market, also known as a broadcast market, media region, designated market area (DMA), or television market area, is a geographic region in which the population receives similar television, radio, and other media offerings, including newspapers and digital media. Media markets are used worldwide for audience measurement, advertising planning, and broadcast regulation, although the methods used to define and measure them vary by country and media system. Markets may align with metropolitan areas, span multiple cities or regions, or include rural areas with shared media coverage. Market boundaries may overlap, particularly near regional borders, allowing audiences to access media from neighboring markets.

Markets are identified by the largest city, which is usually located in the center of the market region. However, geography and the fact that some metropolitan areas have large cities separated by some distance can make markets have unusual shapes and result in two, three, or more names being used to identify a single region (such as Wichita–Hutchinson, Kansas; Chico–Redding, California; Albany–Schenectady–Troy, New York; and Harrisburg–Lebanon–Lancaster–York, Pennsylvania).

In the United States, radio markets are generally a bit smaller than their television counterparts, as broadcast power restrictions are stricter for radio than TV, and TV reaches further via cable. AM band and FM band radio ratings are sometimes separated, as are broadcast and cable television ratings. Market researchers also subdivide ratings demographically between different age groups, genders, and ethnic backgrounds, as well as psychographically between income levels and other non-physical factors. This information is used by advertisers to determine how to reach a specific audience. In countries such as the United States, media regions are defined by a privately held institution without government status; in countries such as the United Kingdom, government-run television stations map their own regions.

== United States ==
=== Television ===
Media markets of the United States

A Television Market Area (TMA) is a group of counties in the United States covered by a specific group of television stations. The term is used by the U.S. Government's Federal Communications Commission (FCC) to regulate broadcast, cable, and satellite transmissions, according to the Code of Federal Regulations, at 47 CFR § 76.51 and FCC.gov. The TMAs not only have full control over local broadcasts, but also delineate which channels will be received by satellite or cable subscribers ("must-carry" rules). These market areas can also be used to define restrictions on rebroadcasting of broadcast television signals. Generally speaking, only stations within the same market area can be rebroadcast. The only exception to this rule is the "significantly viewed" list. Virtually all of the United States is located within the boundaries of exactly one TMA.

A similar term used by Nielsen Media Research is the Designated Market Area (DMA), and they control the trademark on it. DMAs are used by Nielsen Media Research to identify TV stations that best reach an area and attract the most viewers. There are 210 Nielsen DMAs in the United States, 70 of which are metered (in other words, viewership in these markets are estimated automatically instead of through the archaic diary system still in use in the smaller markets).

TMAs may cover a much larger area than the stations that serve it, especially since the digital television transition. This is particularly true in markets that have hilly or mountainous terrain that is ill-suited for digital broadcasting. In these cases, the outlying areas of a TMA may only be served by cable and satellite, or perhaps by small translators. (There are some cases, such as that of Olean, New York, where a sizable number of independent stations operate, but none carry any major network affiliation unless they operate as translators. Because of this, Olean is considered part of the Buffalo, New York market despite none of that city's major signals reaching the city from 70 miles [110 km] away.) Conversely, a geographically small market such as Erie, Pennsylvania may have stations where their signal spills well over into neighboring TMAs (most of Chautauqua County, New York, is closer to Erie than Buffalo, but the county is also located within the Buffalo DMA).

Arbitron (now Nielsen Audio) also maintained similar areas for television ratings, each called an "area of dominant influence" (ADI), which were first created in 1966. For the 1993–1994 television season, there were 209 ADIs in the continental United States. Arbitron stopped offering a television ratings service in late 1993.

=== Radio ===
Nielsen Audio (previously Arbitron) maintains smaller areas for radio stations; each is called an Arbitron Radio Metro. Whereas a typical TMA may cover ten counties, an Arbitron market generally covers two to four, and a TMA may contain two to four separate Radio Metros. There are 302 Radio Metros in the United States, but not all areas of the country are covered.

In 2009, Nielsen began offering radio ratings in competition with Arbitron, starting in those markets ranked 101st and smaller.

== See also ==
- Significantly viewed out-of-market television stations in the United States
