= STELA Reauthorization Act of 2014 =

2014 United States law

- Long title: To amend the Communications Act of 1934 to extend expiring provisions relating to the retransmission of signals of television broadcast stations, and for other purposes.
- Announced in: the 113th United States Congress
- Sponsored by: Rep. Greg Walden (R, OR-2)
- Number of co-sponsors: 3

Codification
- U.S.C. sections affected: 47 U.S.C. § 325, 17 U.S.C. § 122, 17 U.S.C. § 111, 17 U.S.C. § 119, 47 U.S.C. § 339, and others.
- Agencies affected: Government Accountability Office, United States Congress, Federal Communications Commission

Legislative history
- Introduced in the House as H.R. 4572 by Rep. Greg Walden (R, OR-2) on May 6, 2014; Committee consideration by United States House Committee on Energy and Commerce

The STELA Reauthorization Act of 2014 (H.R. 4572) is a bill related to the regulation of satellite broadcasting in the United States.

The bill was introduced into the United States House of Representatives during the 113th United States Congress.

== Background ==
According to a report written by the Congressional Research Service (CRS), there are "three primary ways for a household to receive broadcast television signals: by using an individual antenna that receives broadcast signals directly over-the-air from a television station; by subscribing to a cable television service that brings a wire into the house that carries the retransmitted signals of broadcast stations; or by subscribing to a satellite television service that puts a dish on the roof that receives the retransmitted signals of broadcast stations." The Satellite Television Extension and Localism Act of 2010 (STELA) was the latest in a series of laws regulating satellite television services. If STELA were to expire, the CRS projects that "approximately 1.5 million satellite television households would likely lose distant network broadcast signals."

== Provisions of the bill ==
The STELA Reauthorization Act of 2014 amends the Communications Act of 1934, as amended by the Satellite Television Extension and Localism Act of 2010 (STELA), to extend until December 31, 2019.

=== Extended Provisions ===
- An exemption from retransmission consent requirements for satellite operators for the carriage of distant network signals to “unserved households”;
- The prohibition on exclusive retransmission consent contracts;
- Requirement that television broadcast stations and MVPDs negotiate in good faith.

=== New Provisions ===
- Prohibits joint retransmission consent negotiation by two or more independently owned broadcasters;
- Eliminates the prohibition against changing broadcast signals during the quarterly sweeps;
- Extends deadline to unwind joint sales agreements for which broadcasters seek a waiver and are found non-compliant under the FCC's attribution rules adopted on March 31, 2014;
- Repeal of the FCC's integration ban for cable set-top boxes.

== Procedural history ==
The STELA Reauthorization Act of 2014 was introduced into the United States House of Representatives on May 6, 2014 by Rep. Greg Walden (R, OR-2). The bill was referred to the United States House Committee on Energy and Commerce. On July 11, 2014, it was reported (amended) alongside House Report 113-518. The bill passed the House via voice vote on July 22, 2014. President Barack Obama signed the bill into law on December 4, 2014.

== Debate and discussion ==
The bill was supported by 21st Century Fox, Disney–ABC Television Group, the American Cable Association, the American Television Alliance, CBS, DirecTV, and the National Cable and Telecommunications Association.

The National Association of Broadcasters (NAB) supported the bill. The organization's president, Gordon Smith, announced that "NAB thanks Chairmen Goodlatte and Coble for guiding through the House Judiciary Committee a sensible, non-controversial STELA reauthorization bill ensuring that satellite TV subscribers without access to local TV signals can continue receiving popular programming from broadcast TV networks. NAB strongly supports this practical approach to STELA."

The United States Cattlemen's Association (USCA) supported the bill because it "will help provide continued access to local news and broadcasting services in rural regions."

== See also ==
- List of bills in the 113th United States Congress
