= John Carter (Texas politician) =

American politician (born 1941)

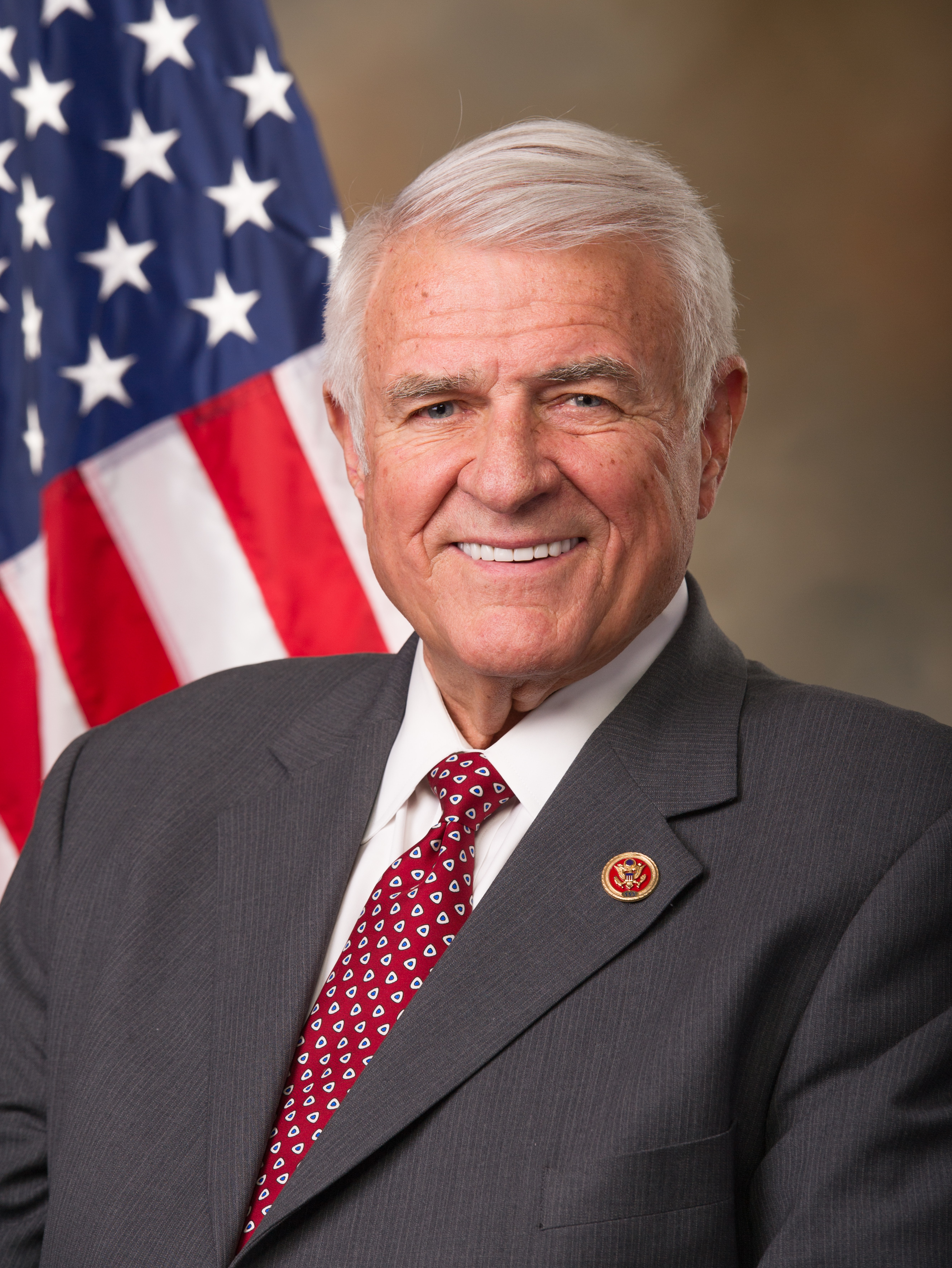
- Official portrait, 2013

Secretary of the House Republican Conference
- In office January 3, 2007 – January 3, 2013
- Leader: John Boehner
- Preceded by: John Doolittle
- Succeeded by: Virginia Foxx

Member of the U.S. House of Representatives from Texas's 31st district
- Incumbent
- Assumed office January 3, 2003
- Preceded by: Constituency established

Personal details
- Born: John Rice Carter; November 6, 1941 (age 85) Houston, Texas, U.S.
- Party: Republican
- Spouse: Erika Carter (m. 1968)
- Children: 4
- Education: Texas Tech University (BA); University of Texas, Austin (JD)
- Website: House website Campaign website
- Carter's voice Carter supporting the Military Spouses Residency Relief Act. Recorded November 2, 2009

John Rice Carter (born November 6, 1941) is an American politician serving as a U.S. representative representing Texas's 31st congressional district since 2003. The district includes the northern suburbs of Austin, as well as Fort Hood. He is a Republican. After winning re-election in 2026, Carter is set to become the dean of Texas's congressional delegation when Representative Lloyd Doggett and Senator John Cornyn leave office in 2027.

== Early life, education, and career ==
Carter was born in Houston, but has spent most of his life in central Texas. He graduated from Texas Tech University with a degree in history in 1964, and earned a Juris Doctor from the University of Texas School of Law in 1969.

After graduating from law school, Carter served as the first general counsel to the Texas House of Representatives' Agriculture Committee. He later began a private law practice in Round Rock.

In 1981, Carter was appointed as judge of the 277th District Court of Williamson County. He was elected to the post a year later, the first Republican elected to a countywide position in the county. He was reelected four times.

In 1984, Carter presided over the trial of confessed serial killer Genene Jones, a nurse who was charged with the September 1981 murder of a 15 months old baby girl in Kerrville, Texas, whom she administered several and ultimately lethal doses of succinylcholine. Jones was convicted and sentenced to 99 years in prison with triple credit, a benefit of the times which set her release for 2018. In 2013, following efforts to keep Jones in prison, Carter admitted in an interview that while he knew about Jones' potential early release when he sentenced her, the jury could not be informed about it before the trial's conclusion, adding that many of them (the jurors) were angry and frustrated when they found out that Jones would have the possibility to get free.

== U.S. House of Representatives ==
=== Elections ===
Carter retired from the bench in 2001 to run for Congress in the newly created 31st District. After finishing second in the Republican primary, he defeated Peter Wareing in the runoff, which was tantamount to election in what was then a heavily Republican district.

For his first term, 2003–05, Carter represented a district that stretched from the suburbs of Austin to far western Houston, and included College Station, home of Texas A&M University. From the 2003 Texas redistricting until 2013, Carter represented a district stretching from the fringes of the Dallas–Fort Worth Metroplex through more rural portions of Central Texas. Redistricting after the 2010 census, which first affected the 2013–15 term, reduced the 31st to Bell and Williamson counties. The 31st now includes Fort Hood, home of the U.S. Army's 3rd Cavalry Regiment and the 1st Cavalry Division.

In 2016, Carter was reelected with 166,060 votes (58.4%) over Democratic nominee Mike Clark and Libertarian Scott Ballard, who received 103,852 (34.5%) and 14,676 (5.2%), respectively.

In 2018, Carter defeated Democratic nominee MJ Hegar with 144,680 votes (50.6%) to her 136,362 (47.7%). It was the smallest victory margin of his career.

=== Tenure ===
Carter was the sponsor of the Identity Theft Penalty Enhancement Act, which George W. Bush signed into law in 2004.

In the 110th Congress, Carter sponsored and co-sponsored a number of bills, including the Military Spouses Residency Relief Act, the Terrorist Death Penalty Act of 2008, and a bill condemning the vandalism of the Vietnam War Memorial on the National Mall.

On June 12, 2009, Carter co-sponsored H.R. 1503, which would require the production of a birth certificate from presidential candidates. The bill was introduced as a result of conspiracy theories that claimed that President Barack Obama is not a natural-born U.S. citizen.

On September 15, 2009, in an opinion piece published in The Hill, Carter called the 111th Congress a "house of hypocrisy" after the House of Representatives voted to rebuke Representative Joe Wilson for an outburst but would not go after Representative and House Ways and Means chair Charlie Rangel, who had been the subject of numerous ethical problems involving taxes and property. Carter is also a proponent of the "Rangel Rule," where IRS penalties and interest would be eliminated if one paid back taxes, similar to the treatment Rangel, Treasury Secretary Timothy Geithner, and former senator (and onetime secretary of health and human services nominee) Tom Daschle received after their tax problems were publicized.

Carter introduced a "Privileged Resolution" that would have forced Rangel's resignation as chair of the Ways and Means Committee after he declined to resign voluntarily, citing the inaction of the House Democratic Caucus and the ongoing investigations as reasons. The resolution failed largely along party lines, with two Democrats and six Republicans breaking ranks.

Carter amended his financial disclosure forms in October 2009 to list nearly $300,000 in capital gains from the sale of ExxonMobil stock in 2006 and 2007. Though he listed the sale of the assets, he did not list the actual amount of capital gains, on which he did pay taxes.

On November 16, 2009, Carter introduced legislation to give combatant casualty status to the victims of the 2009 Fort Hood shooting, similar to those who were killed in Afghanistan and Iraq.

In 2015, Carter cosponsored a resolution to amend the US constitution to ban same-sex marriage.

On May 16, 2018, Carter was named the new chair of the Military Construction and Veterans Affairs Subcommittee on Appropriations after Charlie Dent retired. He had previously chaired the Homeland Security Subcommittee on Appropriations.

Carter co-sponsored H.R. 4760, the Securing America's Future Act of 2018, which failed to pass the House.

On December 18, 2019, Carter voted against both articles of impeachment against Trump. Of the 195 Republicans who voted, all voted against both impeachment articles.

On January 6, 2021, Carter voted against certifying the results of the 2020 United States presidential election based on spurious allegations of voter fraud.

Carter was among the 71 Republicans who voted against final passage of the Fiscal Responsibility Act of 2023 in the House.

Carter voted to provide Israel with support following the October 7 attacks.

==== 2024 Republican primary ====
Carter was named as part of the Trump campaign's Texas leadership team in March.

=== Committee assignments ===
- Committee on Appropriations
  - Subcommittee on Military Construction, Veterans Affairs, and Related Agencies (Chairman)
  - Subcommittee on Defense

=== Party leadership and caucus memberships ===
- House Army Caucus (Co-chair)
- House Republican Conference (Secretary)
- United States Congressional International Conservation Caucus
- Republican Steering Committee
- Sportsmen's Caucus
- Tea Party Caucus
- Congressional Cement Caucus
- Congressional Western Caucus
- I-14 Caucus
- Republican Study Committee

== Electoral history ==
Carter was reelected to his 13th term in Congress in 2024.

U.S. House, Texas's 31st Congressional District (General Election)
Year	Winning candidate	Party	Pct	Opponent	Party	Pct
2002	John Carter	Republican	69.1%	David Bagley	Democratic	27.4%
2004	John Carter (inc.)	Republican	64.8%	Jon Porter	Democratic	32.5%
2006	John Carter (inc.)	Republican	58.5%	Mary Beth Herrell	Democratic	38.8%
2008	John Carter (inc.)	Republican	60.3%	Brian Ruiz	Democratic	36.6%
2010	John Carter (inc.)	Republican	82.5%	Bill Oliver	Libertarian	17.5%
2012	John Carter (inc.)	Republican	61.3%	Stephen Wyman	Democratic	35%
2014	John Carter (inc.)	Republican	64%	Louie Minor	Democratic	32%
2016	John Carter (inc.)	Republican	58.4%	Mike Clark	Democratic	36.5%
2018	John Carter (inc.)	Republican	50.6%	Mary Jennings Hegar	Democratic	47.7%
2020	John Carter (inc.)	Republican	53.5%	Donna Imam	Democratic	44.3%
2022	John Carter (inc.)	Republican	100%	None		
2024	John Carter (inc.)	Republican	64.4%	Stuart Whitlow	Democratic	35.6%

== Personal life ==
Carter married his wife, Erika, in 1968. They have four children and six grandchildren. Since 1971, they have lived in Round Rock, Texas.

U.S. House of Representatives
New constituency	Member of the U.S. House of Representatives from Texas's 31st congressional district 2003–present	Incumbent
Party political offices
Preceded by John Doolittle	Secretary of the House Republican Conference; 2007–2013	Succeeded by Virginia Foxx
U.S. order of precedence (ceremonial)
Preceded by Joe Wilson	United States representatives by seniority 37th	Succeeded by Tom Cole
Preceded by Mario Díaz-Balart	Order of precedence of the United States	Succeeded by Darrell Issa
