= Emergency Aid to American Survivors of the Haiti Earthquake Act =

The United States Emergency Aid to American Survivors of the Haiti Earthquake Act was signed into law by President Barack Obama on January 27, 2010, in response to the massive 2010 earthquake in Haiti.

The law expanded the repatriation funds of the Health and Human Services Department from $1 million to $25 million. In addition, it provided assistance to low-income Medicare beneficiaries by paying their Part B premiums.

== See also ==
List of acts of the 111th United States Congress
