= Television station =

Organization that transmits content over a television channel

A television station is a set of equipment managed by a business, organisation or other entity such as an amateur television (ATV) operator, that transmits video content and audio content via radio waves directly from a transmitter on the earth's surface to any number of tuned receivers simultaneously.

== Overview ==
The Fernsehsender Paul Nipkow (TV Station Paul Nipkow) in Berlin, Germany, was the first regular television service in the world. It was on the air from 22 March 1935, until it was shut down in 1944. The station was named after Paul Gottlieb Nipkow, the inventor of the Nipkow disk. Most often the term "television station" refers to a station which broadcasts structured content to an audience or it refers to the organization that operates the station. A terrestrial television transmission can occur via analog television signals or, more recently, via digital television signals. Television stations are differentiated from cable television or other video providers as their content is broadcast via terrestrial radio waves. A group of television stations with common ownership or affiliation are known as a TV network and an individual station within the network is referred to as owned-and-operated or affiliate, respectively.

Because television station signals use the electromagnetic spectrum, which in the past has been a common, scarce resource, governments often claim authority to regulate them. Broadcast television systems standards vary around the world. Television stations broadcasting over an analog system were typically limited to one television channel, but digital television enables broadcasting via subchannels as well. Television stations usually require a broadcast license from a government agency which sets the requirements and limitations on the station. In the United States, for example, a television license defines the broadcast range, or geographic area, that the station is limited to, allocates the broadcast frequency of the radio spectrum for that station's transmissions, sets limits on what types of television programs can be programmed for broadcast and requires a station to broadcast a minimum amount of certain programs types, such as public affairs messages.

Another form of television station is non-commercial educational (NCE) and considered public broadcasting.

To avoid concentration of media ownership of television stations, government regulations in most countries generally limit the ownership of television stations by television networks or other media operators, but these regulations vary considerably. Some countries have set up nationwide television networks, in which individual television stations act as mere repeaters of nationwide programs. In those countries, the local television station has no station identification and, from a consumer's point of view, there is no practical distinction between a network and a station, with only small regional changes in programming, such as local television news.

== Transmission ==
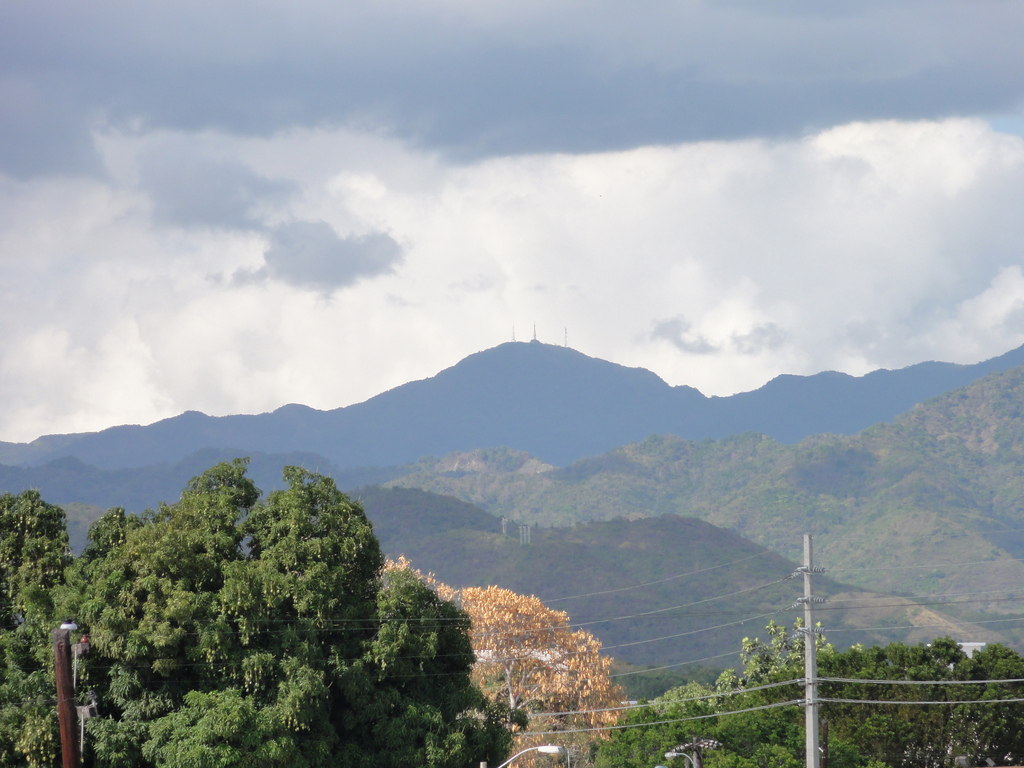
Cerro de Punta, Puerto Rico's highest peak, and its TV transmission towers

To broadcast its programs, a television station requires operators to operate equipment, a transmitter or radio antenna, which is often located at the highest point available in the transmission area, such as on a summit, the top of a high skyscraper, or on a tall radio tower. To get a signal from the master control room to the transmitter, a studio/transmitter link (STL) is used. The link can be either by radio or T1/E1. A transmitter/studio link (TSL) may also send telemetry back to the station, but this may be embedded in subcarriers of the main broadcast. Stations which retransmit or simulcast another may simply pick-up that station over-the-air, or via STL or satellite. The license usually specifies which other station it is allowed to carry.

VHF stations often have very tall antennas due to their long wavelength, but require much less effective radiated power (ERP), and therefore use much less transmitter power output, also saving on the electricity bill and emergency backup generators. In North America, full-power stations on band I (channels 2 to 6) are generally limited to 100 kW analog video (VSB) and 10 kW analog audio (FM), or 45 kW digital (8VSB) ERP. Stations on band III (channels 7 to 13) can go up by 5dB to 316 kW video, 31.6 kW audio, or 160 kW digital. Low-VHF stations are often subject to long-distance reception just as with FM. There are no stations on Channel 1.

UHF, by comparison, has a much shorter wavelength, and thus requires a shorter antenna, but also higher power. North American stations can go up to 5000 kW ERP for video and 500 kW audio, or 1000 kW digital. Low channels travel further than high ones at the same power, but UHF does not suffer from as much electromagnetic interference and background "noise" as VHF, making it much more desirable for TV. Despite this, in the U.S., the Federal Communications Commission (FCC) is taking another large portion of this band (channels 52 to 69) away, in contrast to the rest of the world, which has been taking VHF instead. This means that some stations left on VHF are harder to receive after the analog shutdown. Since at least 1974, there are no stations on channel 37 in North America for radio astronomy purposes.

== Program production ==
Most television stations are commercial broadcasting enterprises which are structured in a variety of ways to generate revenue from television commercials. They may be an independent station or part of a broadcasting network, or some other structure. They can produce some or all of their programs or buy some broadcast syndication programming for or all of it from other stations or independent production companies.

Many stations have some sort of television studio, which on major-network stations is often used for newscasts or other local programming. There is usually a news department, where journalists gather information. There is also a section where electronic news-gathering (ENG) operations are based, receiving remote broadcasts via remote pickup unit or satellite TV. Outside broadcasting vans, production trucks, or SUVs with electronic field production (EFP) equipment are sent out with reporters, who may also bring back news stories on video tape rather than sending them back live.

To keep pace with technology United States television stations have been replacing operators with broadcast automation systems to increase profits in recent years.

Some stations (known as repeaters or translators) only simulcast another, usually the programmes seen on its owner's flagship station, and have no television studio or production facilities of their own. This is common in developing countries. Low-power stations typically also fall into this category worldwide.

Most stations which are not simulcast produce their own station identifications. TV stations may also advertise on or provide weather (or news) services to local radio stations, particularly co-owned sister stations. This may be a barter in some cases.

== See also ==
- Class A television service
- Digital television transition
- Fernsehsender Paul Nipkow: the world's first regular television service
- Low-power broadcasting
- Must carry
- Pay television
- Significantly viewed out of market TV stations in the United States
- Terrestrial television
- List of European television stations
- List of North American broadcast station classes
- Lists of television stations in North America
