= Servicemembers Civil Relief Act =

U.S. federal law

The Servicemembers Civil Relief Act (formerly called the Soldiers' and Sailors' Civil Relief Act of 1940) (codified at 50 U.S.C. §§ 3901—4043) is a United States federal law that protects soldiers, sailors, airmen, marines, coast guardsmen, and commissioned officers in the Public Health Service and National Oceanic and Atmospheric Administration from being sued while in active military service of their country and for up to a year after active duty, as well as U.S. citizens serving with allied military forces for the duration of a military conflict involving the United States.

== History ==
Despite the act's official title dating it to 1940, its origins can be traced as far back as the Civil War when the United States Congress passed a total moratorium on civil actions brought against Union soldiers and sailors. In basic terms, this meant that any legal action involving a civil matter was put on hold until after the soldier or sailor returned from the war. Examples of civil matters included breach of contract, bankruptcy, foreclosure, or divorce proceedings.

Congress' intent in passing the moratorium was to protect both national interests and those of servicemembers. First, Congress wanted servicemembers to be able to fight the war without worrying about problems that might arise at home. Secondly, because most soldiers and sailors during the Civil War were not well paid, it was difficult for them to honor their pre-service debts, such as mortgage payments or other credit.

Congressional concern about protecting the rights of servicemembers was raised again during World War I when the Soldiers' and Sailors' Civil Relief Act of 1918 was passed. Like the Civil War-era moratorium, the 1918 legislation was designed to protect the rights of service members while they were serving in the war. Although the 1918 Act did not include a total moratorium on civil actions, it did protect service members from actions such as repossession of property, bankruptcy, foreclosure, and others while they were in harm's way. The 1918 Act stayed in effect until shortly after World War I, when it expired.

The present-day statute, essentially a reenactment of the 1918 law, was passed in 1940 to protect the rights of the millions of service members activated for World War II. The major difference between it and the 1918 version, aside from minor modifications, was that it contained no provision for its expiration, whereas the 1918 version did so after World War I. Thus, since 1940, service members have received uninterrupted coverage under the act. And indeed, congressional commitment and support for the act have remained so strong that the act has been amended more than 12 times since 1940 to keep pace with a changing military and a changing world, with the last amendments added in 2003 through the Servicemembers Civil Relief Act.

== Provisions ==
Courts will generally require litigants to provide proof that an individual is not on active duty before adverse action is taken, i.e., foreclosures, garnishments, attachments, evictions, and judgments. The benefits conferred upon servicemembers extend beyond active duty. Verification of active military duty can be obtained online through the Defense Manpower Data Center.

The act also specifically states that servicemembers and their spouses do not gain or lose a domicile based on their presence or lack thereof in any U.S. jurisdiction solely on the basis of military orders. Section 571 outlines this concept for purposes of taxation, and Section 595 for voting purposes.

Under the SCRA, service members are entitled to a cap of 6% on interest rates for pre-existing debts incurred before active duty. The law also restricts the use of military allotments, protecting servicemembers from unauthorized automatic deductions from their military pay. Additionally, efforts are made to safeguard servicemembers from identity theft.

A January 2023 amendment to the SCRA added a provision that provides license portability for servicemembers and their spouses. This allows them to practice a profession using an out-of-state license in most cases.

The provisions regarding license portability were updated in December 2024, with the following changes:

- Any written communication from a servicemember's commanding officer that indicates a change in duty station will serve as proof of military status. Previously, members and spouses had been required to provide the new state's licensing agency with a copy of the member's actual military orders, which are often delayed.
- Licensing agencies are authorized to issue temporary licenses if they cannot issue a permanent license within 30 days of receiving an application.
- Agencies are allowed to conduct background checks before recognizing an out-of-state license or issuing a temporary license.
- The applicant is no longer required to have actively used the license in the two years before the move.
- Law licenses, which were not included in the 2023 amendment, are now covered.

However, under the 2024 amendment, holders of licenses recognized by multiple states under an interstate licensing compact are not eligible for SCRA portability if they move to a non-compact state. These holders must meet the new state's requirements.

== See also ==
- Military Spouses Residency Relief Act

== Sources ==
- United States Department of Justice
- United States Department of Defense
