= Retransmission consent =

Legal provision regarding U.S. cable television

Retransmission consent is a provision of the 1992 United States Cable Television Consumer Protection and Competition Act that requires cable operators and other multichannel video programming distributors (MVPDs) to obtain permission from commercial broadcasters before carrying their programming.

Under the provision, a broadcast station (or its affiliated/parent broadcast network) can ask for monetary payment or other compensation, such as carriage of an additional channel. If the cable operator rejects the broadcaster's proposal, the station can prohibit the cable operator from retransmitting its signal.

In the United States, the Federal Communications Commission (FCC) regulates this area of business and public policy pursuant to 47 U.S.C. Part II.

== History ==
Since the 1960s, the Federal Communications Commission had established must-carry rules, which required cable television operators to carry all significantly viewed local stations. In 1985 and 1987, the judiciary decided that the must-carry rules were in violation of the First Amendment rights of the cable operators.

In response, the Congress passed the 1992 Cable Act, which established a combination of must-carry and retransmission consent provisions. Stations were given the right to either require cable operators to carry their signal at no cost, or negotiate with cable operators for carriage fees that the latter could refuse.

Initially, cable carriers' reaction was to refuse to pay for broadcast programming. John Malone, head of cable giant TeleCommunications Inc. refused to pay to carry broadcasters' content saying, "I don't intend to pay any money ... I will scratch backs." Instead of monetary payment, some broadcast networks agreed to distribute secondary channels. America's Talking (now MSNBC), FX, and ESPN2 all originated through retransmission consent deals in the early 1990s. Many PBS stations received additional local channels.

However, in the mid-2000s, the stations succeeded in earning carriage fees from cable/satellite systems.

=== Legislative history ===
Legislation governing the retransmission of broadcast television content by satellite companies is required to be renewed on a regular basis. As of 2018, the legislation has been enacted four times. These acts renewed statutory licenses that allow satellite TV companies to retransmit broadcast stations to their customers:

- 1999: Satellite Home Viewer Improvement Act
- 2004: Satellite Home Viewer Extension and Reauthorization Act
- 2010: Satellite Television Extension and Localism Act
- 2014: STELA Reauthorization Act

== Debate ==
Retransmission consent has drawn criticism from the cable operators who redistribute programming, and therefore must seek consent from the broadcasters for their program content. Cable programmers have argued that there is a "shift in leverage toward broadcasters" within the market since introduction of retransmission compensation.

Broadcasters typically claim that the programming they provide costs money, and these retransmission fees allow them to provide this expensive programming. Further, the Cable Act created retransmission consent in order to fix a market imbalance and the marketplace and contract disputes should be addressed in the marketplace.

=== Programming disruptions ===
Cable operators typically claim during a carriage dispute that the broadcasters are forcing the viewing public to pay for content that is essentially given away for free to those who use an antenna to receive the station.

Alternatively, broadcasters have argued that the free market approach discourages carriage disputes. In a 2013 op-ed, former FCC commissioner, Robert McDowell, argued:

TV stations make more money as more people see their shows, thus creating an incentive to distribute their product as widely as possible. These same market forces also create a disincentive for broadcasters to withhold their signals from distributors like cable and satellite companies.

== See also ==
- Carriage dispute
- Fee-for-carriage - a similar proposed policy supported by broadcasters in Canada
- Must-carry
- Significantly viewed
