= Twenty-First Century Communications and Video Accessibility Act of 2010 =

US law

- Other short titles: 21st Century Communications and Video Accessibility Act
- Long title: An act to increase the access of persons with disabilities to modern communications, and for other purposes.
- Acronyms (colloquial): CVAA
- Enacted by: the 111th United States Congress

Citations
- Public law: Pub. L. 111–260 (text) (PDF)

Codification
- Acts amended: Communications Act of 1934

Legislative history
- Signed into law by President Barack Obama on October 8, 2010

The Twenty-First Century Communications and Video Accessibility Act of 2010 (CVAA) is a United States accessibility law. Signed on October 8, 2010, by then-president Barack Obama, the bill amended the Communications Act of 1934 to include updated requirements for ensuring the accessibility of "modern" telecommunications to people with disabilities.

Title I of the Act imposes accessibility standards on "advanced" telecommunications products and services, while Title II of the Act imposes various requirements on the accessibility of televisions, television services, and television programming, including additional requirements on the provision of closed captioning in regards to streaming video, and new requirements on the provision of programming presented with audio description by the top television networks and non-broadcast channels.

== Titles ==
=== Title I - Communications Access ===
Title I of the CVAA mandates that "advanced communications services and products" (including electronic messaging, VoIP, and video conferencing) be accessible to users with disabilities. Mobile web browsers must be accessible to users who are blind or visually impaired. VoIP providers must contribute to the interstate Telecommunications Relay Services Fund, while the definition of a TRS is updated to take into account scenarios such as deafblindness and communications between different types of relay users. "Telephone-like devices" designed for use with advanced communications services must have hearing aid compatibility, and the FCC received authorization to "ensure reliable and interoperable access to next generation 9-1-1 services by people with disabilities."

After multiple extensions, waivers to these rules covering communications systems in online video games lapsed after December 31, 2018.

=== Title II - Video Programming ===
Title II of the CVAA imposes accessibility requirements on television programming and streaming video. Programming that contained closed captioning when originally aired on television, or is "generally comparable" to linear television (excluding "consumer-generated media") must offer closed captioning when distributed as streaming video. The user interfaces of televisions, and set-top boxes from television providers, must offer accessibility options for the blind and visually impaired.

Under the CVAA, the Federal Communications Commission has the authority to regulate the inclusion of audio description (AD, known in the law as "video description") — an audio track that contains narration describing key visual elements of a program for the blind and visually impaired — in television programming. All devices capable of receiving video programming (including in addition, devices with screens less than 13 inches in size) must have the capability to support closed captioning and AD. If achievable, devices capable of recording television programming must be able to retain captioning and AD in their recordings.

The FCC also established the Video Programming and Emergency Access Advisory Committee (VPEAAC) in December 2010, which consists of working groups devoted to accessibility in video programming.

==== Video description ====
Effective July 1, 2012, under an FCC report and order implementing the Act, affiliates of the four major networks (ABC, CBS, Fox, and NBC) in certain media markets, and television providers with more than 50,000 subscribers, via the top five non-broadcast networks not dedicated primarily to "near-live" programming (aired within 24 hours of production) as determined every three years by Nielsen ratings, are required to broadcast a minimum amount of programming containing AD per-quarter. All stations and television providers that have the technological capability to do so must be able to pass AD tracks if provided by a programming source (with reasoning against doing so including the second audio program already being occupied by Spanish-language audio, or not having the required equipment, for instance). Broadcasters and program guides are encouraged to promote the availability of AD, but there is no requirement to do so.

The quotas are to be gradually increased over time: it initially applied to the top 25 markets for broadcast stations, and required that 50 hours of described programming be aired per-quarter, as either "children's" (aimed towards viewers aged 16 and younger, unrelated to the Children's Television Act definition that restricts advertising load) or primetime programs. The top non-broadcast channels that must supply video descriptions are refreshed every three years, based on the previous year's ratings: upon the introduction of the rules, they were Disney Channel, Nickelodeon, TBS, TNT, and USA Network. The AD requirement expanded to the top 60 markets beginning July 1, 2015, and increased to 87.5 hours per-quarter, at any time between 6:00 a.m. and midnight (rather than only primetime or children's programming) effective July 2018. As of the current policy, Nickelodeon and Disney Channel have since been displaced by History and HGTV on the top 5 non-broadcast channels, respectively.

==== Audible crawl ====
Under the act, broadcasters, television providers, and video programming devices must be able to convey "emergency information" in a format accessible to the blind and visually impaired. The FCC imposed this directive beginning May 26, 2015, requiring that emergency information displayed in a textual format outside of the Emergency Alert System and newscasts (such as in a news ticker displayed by the broadcaster) must be dictated on the SAP audio channel. The FCC required that non-textual information also be described in this manner, but the deadline for this mandate was delayed to May 26, 2023, after requests from the American Council of the Blind, the American Foundation for the Blind, and the National Association of Broadcasters (NAB), who assessed that technology for doing so in an automated, and non-burdening manner had not yet been developed. Also after consultation with broadcasters, the FCC removed a requirement for school closings to also be classified as emergency information, as their intense length, coupled with a requirement for this information to be read twice, would be too unwieldy.

In November 2024, the NAB requested a further delay, citing that the required technology was still non-existent, and that "it remains impossible for stations to continue to provide important emergency information to viewers while complying with the audible crawl rule as written".

== See also ==
- Americans with Disabilities Act
- The ultimate guide to website accessibility for Section 508 and WCAG 2.1 A/AA.
