= Significantly viewed out-of-market television stations in the United States =

Significantly viewed signals permitted to be carried 47 U.S.C. § 340 or the Significantly Viewed list (SV) is a federal law which allows television stations as determined by the Federal Communications Commission (FCC) to be carried by cable and other multichannel video programming distributor (MVPD) providers outside their assigned Nielsen designated market area (DMA). This legislation was passed to protect viewers living near market boundaries from losing local television stations with significant viewership outside their market. It also allows for the carriage of local foreign stations in markets along international borders.

== History ==
In 2005, the FCC completed a study of media markets and created a list of counties where out-of-market television stations are significantly viewed over the air. The study also looked at the viewership history of Community Access Television (CATV) installations throughout the country, the predecessor of cable television. Present-day cable-television content is more focused on premium-channel programming than its original purpose of picking up local programming from television stations in a specific area.

Due to the advance of digital cable during the 2010s, cable providers such as Comcast and Time Warner Cable (present-day Spectrum) began removing out-of-market television stations from basic-cable lineups to conserve bandwidth use, eliminate redundant network affiliates, and fulfill federal mandates to keep local affiliates.

=== Significantly-viewed channel preservation and CATV ===
Two examples of SV-channel preservation on digital cable and CATV favoring a non-designated market area are in Belvidere, New Jersey, along the Delaware River. Phillipsburg, Milford, Frenchtown, and Lambertville are all downstream on the Delaware. Belvidere leaned towards the Philadelphia market in television reception, since could not receive New York City-area stations. Because it is in Warren County, however, it is officially part of the New York City television market. When cable providers advanced with premium programming and (later) digital cable service, the Philadelphia stations disappeared from basic cable tiers; KYW-TV, WCAU, and WTXF-TV, however, were later moved to the digital-cable tier.

=== Redundant affiliates ===
An example of redundant affiliates serving the same area is in Harrisonburg, Virginia. The Harrisonburg DMA consists of two Virginia counties and one West Virginia county. Harrisonburg is a fringe area because it is within the National Radio Quiet Zone, 100 miles (161 km) from Washington, D.C. and Richmond (whose DMA had formerly included Harrisonburg) and Roanoke, Virginia, and about 40 miles (64 km) from Charlottesville, Virginia (a separate media market which had also been part of the Richmond DMA). Comcast's Harrisonburg system carries two ABC affiliates (in-market affiliate WHSV-TV and Richmond station WRIC-TV), four NBC affiliates (WVIR-TV in Charlottesville, WRC-TV in Washington, D.C., WSLS-TV in Roanoke, and WWBT in Richmond), two CBS affiliates (WUSA in Washington and WTVR in Richmond), and two Fox affiliates (WHSV's second digital subchannel and WTTG in Washington).

The Harrisonburg market has only one PBS station for (in-market WVPT); the market's other network affiliates are WHSV's MyNetworkTV-affiliated third digital subchannel and a CW-affiliated subchannel of WVIR. Before 2006, many of these stations were on the same basic-cable tier but were dropped to preserve bandwidth and eliminate multiple affiliates. All the stations not mentioned in the basic-cable tier have been moved to digital cable.

Toledo, Ohio is 50 miles (80 km) from a major market (Detroit). Most of Detroit's signals reach the Toledo market, and have been carried on Buckeye Broadband. This is similar to Baltimore (near Philadelphia and Washington, D.C.) and Topeka (within range of Kansas City's television stations). A significantly-viewed, redundant affiliate may be valuable to a cable-television company in a carriage dispute if it has the same network but different local owners.

=== Controversy ===
The loss of a long-time out-of-market affiliate station in Lumberton, North Carolina was controversial. For decades, the city has been reliant for NBC coverage from WECT in Wilmington, North Carolina. Lumberton has been in and out of DMAs between the Raleigh, Wilmington, and Florence–Myrtle Beach markets, and has been in the Florence–Myrtle Beach market since the late 1990s. Parts of the market over-the-air or on cable received a different NBC affiliate: WIS (Columbia, South Carolina), WECT (Wilmington), WCNC (Charlotte), or WCBD (Charleston, South Carolina).

The Florence–Myrtle Beach market received its own NBC affiliate in August 2008, when Raycom Media signed on WMBF. On the day that WMBF launched, cable providers were required to drop sister stations WECT and WIS from cable systems in the market. Lumberton residents who subscribed to Time Warner Cable protested the move, and pushed to get WECT back on the cable-channel lineup; WMBF, WECT and WIS were all owned by Raycom, however, and the removal would promote WMBF in its home market over its out-of-market sister stations. Also, WMBF's over-the-air signal does not reach the North Carolina side of the Florence–Myrtle Beach market. On December 1, 2008, WECT returned to Time Warner Cable's Lumberton service area on a digital-cable tier.

== See also ==
- Must-carry
- Retransmission consent
- Satellite Home Viewer Act (US)
- Cable television in the United States
- Digital cable
- Syndication exclusivity
