= Military Spouses Residency Relief Act =

US federal law

- Long title: An act to amend the Servicemembers Civil Relief Act to guarantee the equity of spouses of military personnel with regard to matters of residency, and for other purposes.
- Enacted by: the 111th United States Congress

Citations
- Public law: Pub. L. 111–97 (text) (PDF)
- Statutes at Large: 123 Stat. 3007

Codification
- Acts amended: Servicemembers Civil Relief Act

Legislative history
- Introduced in the Senate as S. 475 by Richard Burr on February 25, 2009; Committee consideration by Veterans' Affairs; Passed the Senate on August 4, 2009; Passed the House on November 2, 2009; Signed into law by President Barack Obama on November 11, 2009

Military Spouses Residency Relief Act Coalition Logo

Military Spouses Residency Relief Act Coalition Bill Logo

The Military Spouses Residency Relief Act (MSRRA) signed into law on November 11, 2009, was originally introduced by Congressman John Carter (Texas) during the 110th United States Congress. The MSRRA was written to amend the Servicemembers Civil Relief Act (SCRA) to include protection of military spouses, with regards to voting, property and taxes, and provide equitable treatment of military spouses.

Congressman Carter sponsored the bill after two military spouses, Army spouse Rebecca Noah Poynter and Navy spouse Joanna Williamson, approached him about residency concerns resulting from military moves and increasing deployments due to the war on terrorism. Military spouses were required to become a resident of the state where they resided, in contrast to service members that could maintain a home state.

During the bill's life in the 110th Congress, H.R. 6070 had 72 co-sponsors. It is believed that the bill could have passed during the 110th Congress but due to the housing crisis in 2008 it was quickly dismissed.

On February 25, 2009, of the 111th United States Congress, Congressman Carter reintroduced MSRRA; H.R. 1182.

Senator Richard Burr introduced the companion bill, S. 475, to the Senate Committee of Veterans' Affairs on February 25, 2009. Rebecca Poynter testified at the Senate Committee of Veterans' Affairs in April. May 7, 2009 MSRRA passed a Senate floor vote.

== Supporting Organizations ==
During the Congressional bill process, Military Officers Association of America (MOAA) was the lead veteran organization with these organizations also in support:

- American Legion
- Veterans of Foreign Wars
- Iraq and Afghanistan Veterans of America
- Air Force Sergeants Association
- Paralyzed Veterans of America
- AMVETS
- Vietnam Veterans of America

== Enactment ==
During the bills life in the House, H.R. 1182 had 208 co-sponsors. It was on its way for full House Veterans' Affairs Committee vote when S. 475 was signed into law.

The bill S. 475 had 44 co-sponsors. It passed the Senate Veterans Affairs Committee and passed during House floor debate on November 2, 2009.

A team from the Military Spouse Business Association, Rebecca Noah Poynter, Joanna Williamson, Rikki Winters, Lynn Carroll, Lanette Lepper, and Kara Acosta, led a support campaign to include a Facebook site of military families. The grassroots and virtual Facebook social media campaign built to 22,000 allowing public support from military families across the country to be expressed to legislators. Military Spouses and supporters across the nation (Pete Seidler, Cynthia Wass Shepard, Carolyn Duft LeVering, Susan Cross Johnston, David Etheridge, Rick Trevino) volunteered virtually to increase support by contacting Senate and House Offices, and answering questions.

On Veterans Day, November 11, 2009, President Barack Obama signed Pub. L. 111–97 (text) (PDF).

The President of the United States, Barack Obama, issued a press release after he signed the bill. The Military Times called the bill "landmark legislation" for military families.

== Sponsors ==
- Congressman John Carter
- Senator Richard Burr
- Senator Dianne Feinstein

== Support ==
- MOAA.
- Military Spouse Business Association
- AMVETS.
- VFW.
- The American Legion
- Paralyzed Veterans of America
- Iraq and Afghanistan Veterans of America.
- Air Force Association
- Vietnam Veterans of America.
- Air Force Sergeants Association
- Military Spouses Coalition

== Additional Updates to SCRA ==
1. Senator Jon Tester introduced the Veterans Benefits and Transition Act of 2018, S. 2248, during the 115th United States Congress. The bill that became Public Law No. 115-407, again amends the Servicemembers Civil Relief Act (SCRA) to provide expanded protections for military spouses with regard to voting and taxes.
2. Veterans Auto and Education Improvement Act of 2022, H.R. 7939, during the 117th United States Congress. The bill became Public Law No. 117-333 modifies the Servicemembers Civil Relief Act.
