= Satellite Television Extension and Localism Act of 2010 =

2010 United States law

The Satellite Television Extension and Localism Act of 2010 or STELA is one of the acts of the 111th United States Congress. It renewed the Satellite Home Viewer Extension and Reauthorization Act of 2004 and the Satellite Home Viewer Improvement Act of 1999 (SHVIA), which govern the retransmission of broadcast television content by satellite companies. The act renewed statutory licenses that allow satellite TV companies to retransmit broadcast stations to their customers for five years. The licenses had been set to expire at the end of May 2010, and the bill also included measures to modernize and simplify licensing processes and encourage satellite providers to make more local content available.

The bill was initially sponsored by Sen. Jay Rockefeller, a Democrat from West Virginia, and co-sponsored by Sen. John Kerry, a Massachusetts Democrat. It cleared the Senate Committee on Commerce, Science, and Transportation in November 2009. It was reintroduced as S. 3333, this time by Sen. Pat Leahy of Vermont, on May 7, 2010, and passed the same day. On May 12, 2010, the U.S. House of Representatives passed the Satellite Television Extension and Localism Act of 2010.

Provisions set to expire on May 31, 2010, were extended to December 31, 2014, and new provisions will sunset on December 31, 2014.

On May 6, 2014, Rep. Greg Walden introduced the STELA Reauthorization Act of 2014 (H.R. 4572; 113th Congress), a bill that would extend some of the provisions of STELA 2010.
