= Must-carry =

Rules requiring cable companies to carry local broadcast television stations

In cable television, many governments, including the ones of the United Kingdom, the United States, and Canada, apply a must-carry regulation stating that forces a cable TV provider to carry the public interest programming, like locally licensed television stations, on a provider's system. In some countries, this "traditional" approach had been extended to the Internet information sources. Similar approach in other sectors, like telecommunications, is called universal service.

== North America ==
=== Canada ===
Under current Canadian Radio-television and Telecommunications Commission (CRTC) regulations, the lowest tier of service on all Canadian television providers may not be priced higher than $25 a month, and must include all local Canadian broadcast television channels, local legislative and educational services, and all specialty services that have 9.1(1)(h) must-carry status. All specialty channels licensed by the CRTC as a mainstream news channel must also be offered by all television providers, although they need not be on the lowest tier of service.

In the mid-to-late 1970s, the CRTC implemented a rule that a cable system must carry a broadcast television station at no cost to the broadcaster if the transmitter emitted an equivalent isotropically radiated power (EIRP) of at least 5 watts. This CRTC rule may have changed over the years, but in principle, a broadcast television station transmitting at 1 kilowatt EIRP must be carried. The status of terrestrial digital only channels with respect to the must-carry requirement is untested, because, unlike those in the U.S., some television stations in Canada did not operate digital signals until the digital television transition in Canada in August 2011. The digital broadcasters that were active before then were merely high-definition simulcasts of those stations' existing analog signals in major centres, such as Toronto and Vancouver, with no additional digital subchannels offered. This was because broadcasters declined to carry subchannels, for which CRTC rules required separate licenses.

For many years, the Canadian must-carry rules created very little friction between terrestrial broadcasters and cable systems, as providers are allowed to more aggressively implement other digital telecommunications services (like cable internet services and IP telephony) with less overall regulation than their U.S. counterparts. However, in 2008, two of Canada's largest commercial television networks, CTV and Global, began to demand that the CRTC permit them to charge a fee for cable carriage. CBC Television and A-Channel joined the campaign in 2009, alleging that some smaller-market stations would be forced to cease operations if this was not allowed. The CRTC initially rejected these demands, but later re-opened discussion with Canadian broadcasters to allow charging carriage fees. In 2012, a 5–4 decision by the Supreme Court of Canada ultimately ruled the CRTC did not have the authority to permit broadcasters to charge carriage fees from cable and satellite providers.

=== United States ===
In the United States, the Federal Communications Commission (FCC) regulates this area of business and public policy pursuant to 47 U.S.C. Part II. These rules were upheld in a 5–4 decision by the Supreme Court of the United States in 1994 in the case Turner Broadcasting v. FCC (95-992).

Although cable television service providers routinely carried local affiliates of the major broadcast networks, independent stations and affiliates of minor networks were sometimes not carried, on the premise it would allow cable providers to instead carry non-local programming which they believed would attract more customers to their service.

Many cable operators were also equity owners in these cable channels, especially Tele-Communications Inc., then the nation's largest multiple system operator (MSO), and had moved to replace local channels with equity-owned programming (at the time, TCI held a large stake in Discovery Communications). This pressure was especially strong on cable systems with limited bandwidth for channels.

The smaller local broadcasters argued that by hampering their access to this increasing segment of the local television audience, this posed a threat to the viability of free-to-view broadcast television, which they argued was a worthy public good.

Local broadcast stations also argued cable systems were attempting to serve as a "gatekeeper" in competing unfairly for advertising revenue. Some affiliates of major networks also feared that non-local affiliates might negotiate to provide television programming to local cable services to expand their advertising market, taking away this audience from local stations, with similar adverse impact on free broadcast television.

Although cable providers argued that such regulation would impose an undue burden on their flexibility in selecting which services would be most appealing to their customers, the current "must-carry" rules were enacted by the United States Congress in 1992 (via the Cable Television Protection and Competition Act), and the U.S. Supreme Court upheld the rules in rejecting the arguments of the cable industry and programmers in the majority decision authored by Justice Anthony Kennedy. That decision also held that MSOs were functioning as a vertically integrated monopoly.

A side effect of the must-carry rules is that a broadcast station cannot charge a cable television provider license fees for the program content retransmitted on the cable network under the rule. But note that must-carry is an option of the station and the station may, in lieu of must-carry, negotiate license fees as part of a retransmission consent agreement.

==== Applicability ====
There are a few exceptions to must-carry, most notably:

- Must-carry is the default assumption even if a station does not make a formal request [see US Code Title 47, Section 76.64(f)3].
- Must-carry does not apply if the television station does not want to be carried under the retransmission consent provisions. This applies only to non-commercial educational (NCE) stations. Station operators are allowed to demand payment from cable operators, or negotiate private agreements for carriage, or threaten revocation against the cable operator (see Sinclair, Time Warner Cable). Must-carry is a privilege given to television stations, not a cable company. A cable company cannot use must-carry to demand the right to carry an over-the-air station against the station's wishes.
- A station is not entitled to distribution under must-carry legislation until a certain time after it provides usable signal to the headend for the cable or satellite provider; the station must pay the expense of leased lines to reach providers such as Colorado-based Dish Network or California-based DirecTV.
- Foreign signals, such as Windsor, Ontario stations CBET-DT and CICO, or McAllen, Texas's former CW affiliate (XHRIO-TV), are not required to be carried, but are often carried on border-area cable systems close to the foreign stations.
- Most low-power broadcast stations are not required to be carried, although often in these cases they are bundled to be carried as part of a retransmission consent agreement with a full-power sister station.

==== Digital must-carry ====
Digital must-carry (also incorrectly called "dual must-carry") is the requirement that cable companies carry either the analog (over a hybrid analog/digital cable system) or digital (over a digital-only pay television system like AT&T U-verse or Verizon FiOS) signal. They must still meet the every-subscriber/television receiver laws, i.e. "Pursuant to Section 614(b)(7) and 615(h), the operator of a cable system is required to ensure that signals carried in fulfillment of the must-carry requirements are provided to EVERY subscriber of the system", of local stations. This has been opposed by numerous cable networks, which might be bumped off of digital cable were this to happen, and promoted by television stations and the National Association of Broadcasters, whom it would benefit by passing their high definition or digital multicast signals through to their cable viewers. In June 2006, the FCC was poised to pass new digital must-carry rules, but the item was pulled before a vote actually took place, apparently due to insufficient support for the chairman's position.

In September 2007, the Commission approved a regulation that requires cable systems to carry the analog signals if the cable system uses both types of transmission. The FCC left the decision to also retransmit the digital signal up to the cable provider. Digital-only operators are not required to provide an analog signal for their customers (AT&T U-verse, Verizon FiOS). Small cable operators were allowed to request a waiver. The regulation ended three years after the date of the digital television transition (which occurred on June 12, 2009), and applies only to stations not opting for retransmission consent.

Cable operators (analog and digital) that transmit more than 12 channels need only provide a maximum 1/3 of their total channel size to this must-carry requirement. Thus with about 150 channels available to a 1 GHz operator, they are only required to support up to 50 analog channels (42 for 850 MHz, 36 for 750 MHz). Cable providers that decide to scale back their analog selection merely need provide written notification on their bill (or equivalent) for 30 days prior to their change. Customers already using digital cable set-top boxes will usually be unaffected (if anything after the change, they may get a large number of additional channels because each analog channel can be replaced by 2–36 digital channels). The requirement only applies to must-carry stations; most metro providers carry many more analog stations by choice, not law.

==== Other networks ====
A variation of "must-carry" also applies to DBS services like DirecTV and Dish Network, as first mandated by the Satellite Home Viewer Act. These providers are not required to carry local stations in every metropolitan area in which they provide service, but must carry all of an area's local stations if they carry any at all. Sometimes, these will be placed on spot beams: narrowly directed satellite signals targeted to an area of no more than a few hundred miles diameter, in order to allow the transponder frequencies to be re-used in other markets. In some cases, stations of lower perceived importance are placed on "side satellites" which require a second antenna. This practice has raised some controversy within the industry, leading to the requirement that the satellite provider offer to install any extra dish antenna hardware for free and place a notice to this effect in place of any missing channels.

==== Retransmission consent ====
If a broadcaster elects retransmission consent, there is no obligation for the cable/satellite system to carry the signal. This option allows broadcasters who own stations, including those affiliated with major networks such as CBS, NBC and ABC or Fox to request cash or other compensation from cable/satellite providers for signals. Initially, stations usually attempted to gain further distribution of cable/satellite services and/or co-owned low-power television stations in which they also hold an equity position rather than direct cash compensation, which cable/satellite systems had almost universally balked at paying. However, in the mid 2000s the stations succeeded in earning carriage fees from cable/satellite systems.

In some cases, these channels have been temporarily removed from distribution by systems who felt broadcasters were asking too steep a price for their signal. Examples include the removal of all CBS-owned local stations as well as MTV, VH1 and Nickelodeon from Dish Network for two days in 2004, the removal of ABC-owned stations from Time Warner Cable for a little under a day in 2000, and the removal of all Hearst Television local stations from Time Warner for more than a week in 2012.

In August 2013, Time Warner Cable and CBS Corporation reached an impasse in negotiations over retransmission fees, forcing a one-month blackout of CBS-owned broadcast and cable networks similar to the 2004 Dish Network blackout. It was the longest such blackout to date, and has produced calls for Congress to revisit the issue of retransmission consent. TWC had offered affected customers a $20 credit on their bill for the inconvenience, but the blackout caused at least one class-action lawsuit against the cable operator, and others are pending.

In the U.S., retransmission consent has often been chosen over must-carry by the major commercial television networks. Under the present rules, a new agreement is negotiated every three years, and stations must choose must-carry or retransmission consent for each cable system they wish their signal to be carried on. Non-commercial stations (such as local PBS stations) may not seek retransmission consent and may only invoke must-carry status.

==== See also ====
- Significantly viewed

=== Mexico ===
Before 2013, no regulation required cable or satellite providers to carry national television networks or, in the case of cable, local stations. Cable providers had to negotiate retransmission consent with Televisa and TV Azteca; often, they were bundled with other pay channels. Local stations had to strike separate agreements. This meant that few providers had all of the local stations available in an area, and availability varied significantly among providers in the same city.

As part of the telecommunications reform of 2013 and the Federal Telecommunications and Broadcasting Law (Ley Federal de Telecomunicaciones y Radiodifusión) of 2014, new "must-offer, must-carry" laws were introduced:

- Satellite providers were required to carry national networks with a population reach of 50 percent or greater. Originally, four national networks were designated: Las Estrellas, Canal 5, Azteca 7 and Azteca Uno (formerly Azteca Trece). Since then, Azteca multicast channels a+ and ADN40, as well as new network Imagen Televisión, have also reached the coverage threshold.

- Satellite providers must black out programming on a national network, primarily sporting events, when it is blacked out on the local transmitter in a subscriber's area.

- Cable providers are required to carry on their basic tiers the primary program streams of all stations in the area and place them on the lowest channel numbers on the system, corresponding to their virtual channels. Additional subchannels can be carried in appropriate channel ranges for their content.
- All providers must carry a series of channels from "federal public institutions": Canal Once, Once Niños, Canal Catorce, Canal 22, TV UNAM and Ingenio TV. A separate, pre-existing provision requires carriage of Canal del Congreso.
- All such channels shall be rebroadcast in the highest quality possible.

==== Reactions and conflicts ====
This new law provoked complaints from television companies TV Azteca and Televisa, who argued that the action constituted copyright infringement and sought royalties for the transmission of channels. In addition, Televisa requested a right of amparo to declare that the IFT did not have constitutional power to decide on the television channels. This controversy was solved when the President of Mexico announced the filing of a constitutional controversy before the Supreme Court of Justice of the Nation, to reaffirm the regulatory powers of the Institute, giving the agency legal and judicial power to make decisions on the matter.

== Europe ==
=== Czech Republic ===
In the Czech Republic, all television stations that have a terrestrial licence (analogue or digital) are required to be placed in the lowest (cheapest) offer of all cable, IPTV and satellite companies.

Must-carry regulations apply to:

- All channels of Czech Television - ČT1, ČT2, ČT24 and ČT4 (sport)
- All channels of TV Prima - Prima, Prima Cool and R1 TV
- Two of three channels of TV Nova - Nova and Nova Cinema
- New digital television stations - TV Barrandov and Z1
- Future television stations TV7 (regional news) and RTA (regional television)
- Carriage of TV Pohoda and Febio TV was also mandated by must-carry regulations; however, as investments for these channels were pulled, these channels never commenced broadcasting.

=== Ireland ===
In Ireland, cable, multichannel multipoint distribution services and satellite providers have Comreg regulated "must-carry" stations. For cable companies, this covers RTÉ One, RTÉ Two, Virgin Media One and TG4.

Before 2016 The same rules applied to digital MMDS systems. Analogue MMDS companies were required to carry only TV3 due to serious bandwidth limitations.

=== Netherlands ===
- NPO 1
- NPO 2
- NPO 3
- Regional (provincial) broadcasters (when available)
- Local broadcaster (when available)
- VRT 1
- VRT CANVAS

=== Romania ===
One of the most crowded must-carry rules from Europe is the Romanian, which is compulsory only for cable networks and includes 10 public television stations like TVR1, TVR2, TVR Cultural, TVR News, etc., TV5 Monde, 52 private Romanian TVs that do not require subscribers' tax, and at least two local and/or regional channels available in any area of cable networks operational territory unit. Erdely TV a Hungarian language television licensed in Romania is also compulsory in networks in Transylvania and Banat (western part of Romania close to the border with Hungary) where Hungarian speaking population is above 20% of any city or village. The huge number of private stations is though limited to a maximum of 25% of the total number of channels carried by any network, so the rule is to update every year the list based on audiences in the previous year. The audiovisual authority in Romania, CNA (Consiliul Național al Audiovizualului) publishes every year, at the beginning of February, the updated list.

== Asia ==
=== India ===
The Indian government has applied a must-carry rule for public broadcaster channels from Doordarshan by cable, direct-to-home and IPTV network. Cable television operators must offer DD National, DD News, Lok Sabha TV, Rajya Sabha TV and regional channels to all subscribers. In addition, DD Bharati and DD Urdu must also be carried in their appropriate tiers.

=== Indonesia ===
As stipulated in the Broadcasting Act No. 32 of 2002, all "subscription broadcasting institutions" (pay satellite, cable, and IPTV providers) are required to provide at least 10% of their channel capacity for domestic channels, both public (i.e. TVRI and local public broadcasters) and private broadcasters. Furthermore, according to the act, they also must provide one domestic production-based channel in ten foreign production-based channels, with at least one domestic production-based channel. These rules were rooted from the previous 1997 Broadcasting Act.

Because of the loose regulation, pay television providers are free to determine which network they would carry in their package as long as they reach the 10% minimum. Some providers carrying national private networks (unlike in terrestrial, they excluding local programming) and a number of local stations such as JakTV from Jakarta and JTV from Surabaya, even if the carriage is intended for national subscribers. Some opt to not include several private networks because they do not have an agreement with the respective networks. Also, out of three TVRI national channels and its local stations, only TVRI Nasional is carried by most providers (the exception is Transvision, who also carry TVRI Sport HD in its package). Unlike in terrestrial, the providers neither include local programming from the TVRI Nasional feed like in analog nor carry a dedicated local station's channel as in digital.

=== Philippines ===
The National Telecommunications Commission (NTC) requires all pay television operators to carry licensed free-to-air stations on all their packages. The rule particularly forbids pay-TV operators from excluding such stations in places which ordinarily cannot receive a decent broadcast signal.

=== Thailand ===
In Thailand, all terrestrial television channels are required to be carried on satellite and cable television platforms as free-to-air channels and required to be placed on the same EPG number as their terrestrial counterparts. A must-carry rule was applied to the analog terrestrial television channels and was dropped in 2014 when digital terrestrial television channels replaced analog. Thailand's National Broadcasting and Telecommunications Commission (NBTC) said the must-carry rule will be used to guarantee Thais' basic right to watch free-TV programs via any platform such as terrestrial, cable and satellite receivers.

=== Vietnam ===
The Vietnamese government required 3 must-carry channels (7, then 6 and 4 prior to 2025) to be carried free-to-air on all television platforms such as cable, satellite and the internet. These channels are designed to air news, information and propaganda for the public.

== Sources ==
- Eisenberg, Julie (21 November 2024). "Finding a way forward for Australian News: An examination of local and international regulatory interventions". uts.edu.au. Sydney: University of Technology Sydney.
