= Federal Communications Bar Association =

Professional association for communications law & policy

The Federal Communications Bar Association (FCBA) is the voluntary bar association for attorneys, engineers, consultants, economists, government officials, and law students involved in the study, development, interpretation, and practice of communications and information technology law and policy in the United States. Located in Washington, D.C., the FCBA focuses primarily on the regulatory agencies of the Federal Communications Commission and the state public utility commissions.

Founded in 1936, the FCBA reports a membership of over 2,000 communications lawyers and other interested parties who meet regularly to discuss and debate communications law and policy and other topics of interest to the communications industry. The FCBA includes ten active regional chapters and several standing and ad hoc committees. In addition to providing regular continuing legal educational events and publishing a monthly newsletter, a number of meetings, seminars and social events are organized throughout the year.

Also each year, the FCBA Foundation, awards a number of stipends to law students employed as unpaid summer interns at the FCC.
