= Satellite Home Viewer Act =

The Satellite Home Viewer Act of 1988 (H.R. 2848) comprises a set of regulations which govern the transmissions of television stations in the United States, specifically imposing the restriction of satellite carrier transmissions of a network station's transmissions only to subscribers who cannot receive these broadcasts via antenna and have not subscribed to a cable system providing these broadcasts, and which also concern regularizing satellite carriers' submission of lists of subscribers to networks, the coordination of broadcasting fees with territorial coverage of transmissions, and the distribution of fees to copyright owners of works included in transmissions.

== See also ==
- Must-carry
- Significantly viewed
