= 2024 United States House of Representatives elections in New York =

- November 5, 2024

All 26 New York seats to the United States House of Representatives
	Majority party	Minority party
Party	Democratic	Republican
Last election	15	11
Seats before	16	10
Seats after	19	7
Seat change	▲3	▼3
Popular vote	4,527,087	3,364,296
Percentage	57.21%	42.52%
Swing	▲1.62%	▼1.36%

Democratic hold Democratic gain
Republican hold
Democratic
50–60%
60–70%
70–80%
80–90%
Republican
50–60%
60–70%
70–80%

The 2024 United States House of Representatives elections in New York were held on November 5, 2024, to elect the 26 U.S. representatives from the State of New York, one from each of the state's 26 congressional districts. The elections coincided with the 2024 U.S. presidential election, as well as other elections to the House of Representatives, elections to the United States Senate, and various state and local elections. The primary elections were held on June 25, 2024.

Democrats flipped three seats held by Republicans, and a total of four from the previous election (one of which they flipped in a special election earlier in 2024), despite the concurrent presidential election in the state swinging the most towards Republicans of any state in the nation.

== 2020–2024 redistricting process ==
The new congressional districts map passed by the state legislature Interactive map version

Following the 2020 census, New York lost one congressional seat and its Independent Redistricting Commission (I.R.C.) attempted to draw a new map. However, they could not reach an agreement on the map, and the Democratic-dominated New York State Legislature drew their own new Congressional map. In April 2022, in the lead-up to the 2022 midterms, the New York State Court of Appeals struck down the map as an unconstitutional partisan gerrymander that failed to follow the proper procedures. The Court then appointed an Independent Special Master to create a new map.

In the 2022 House election in New York, under the new map, the Republican Party flipped three seats, bringing the new seat count of 15 for the Democrats and 11 held by Republicans. In March 2023, New York Democrats challenged the new map, deeming it incorrect for the Court to draw the map, claiming that the job lies solely with the Legislature and I.R.C. In July 2023, an intermediate appeals court ruled that the I.R.C. must create another new map for the 2024 House elections. The New York State Republicans challenged the ruling to the Court of Appeals, who ruled on December 12, 2023, that the maps must be redrawn by the legislature and I.R.C. for the 2024 elections. On February 27, 2024, the New York State Legislature voted to reject the bipartisan map and instead favored redrawing the map for Democrats. On February 28, 2024, the state legislature passed a new map, resulting in the 3rd, 18th, and 22nd congressional districts becoming more Democratic, while the 1st became more Republican. The map was signed by Governor Kathy Hochul on the same day.

== Overview ==
In some races, candidates appeared on multiple ballot lines, with Democratic candidates often appearing on the Working Families line and Republican candidates often appearing on the Conservative line. However, they all caucus with either the Democrats or the Republicans.

United States House of Representatives elections in New York, 2024
Party	Votes	Percentage	Seats	+/–
Democratic	4,348,867	54.82%	19	▲3
Republican	3,040,310	38.33%	7	▼3
Conservative	331,892	4.18%	0	
Working Families	198,739	2.51%	0	
Independent	12,602	0.16%	0	
Totals	7,932,410	100.00%	26	

Popular vote
Democratic	54.82%
Republican	38.33%
Other	6.85%

House seats by party nomination
Democratic	73.08%
Working Families	34.62%
Conservative	26.92%
Republican	26.92%
Common Sense	7.69%

House seats by party registration
Democratic	73.08%
Republican	26.92%

=== By district ===
Candidates on multiple ballot lines are marked as the party they caucus with.

District	Democratic		Republican		Others		Total		Result
District	Votes	%	Votes	%	Votes	%	Votes	%	Result
District 1	183,540	44.78%	226,285	55.22%	0	0.00%	409,825	100.0%	Republican hold
District 2	136,371	40.23%	202,597	59.77%	0	0.00%	338,968	100.0%	Republican hold
District 3	187,651	51.79%	174,694	48.21%	0	0.00%	362,344	100.0%	Democratic hold
District 4	191,793	51.15%	183,168	48.85%	0	0.00%	374,961	100.0%	Democratic gain
District 5	168,425	72.93%	62,529	27.07%	0	0.00%	230,954	100.0%	Democratic hold
District 6	120,205	60.70%	74,559	37.65%	3,272	1.65%	198,036	100.0%	Democratic hold
District 7	172,795	78.11%	48,435	21.89%	0	0.00%	221,230	100.0%	Democratic hold
District 8	168,036	75.39%	54,863	24.61%	0	0.00%	222,899	100.0%	Democratic hold
District 9	173,207	74.25%	60,064	25.75%	0	0.00%	233,271	100.0%	Democratic hold
District 10	206,206	82.32%	37,555	14.99%	6,747	2.69%	250,508	100.0%	Democratic hold
District 11	93,586	35.90%	167,099	64.10%	0	0.00%	260,685	100.0%	Republican hold
District 12	260,165	80.51%	62,989	19.49%	0	0.00%	323,154	100.0%	Democratic hold
District 13	181,800	83.54%	35,822	16.46%	0	0.00%	217,622	100.0%	Democratic hold
District 14	132,714	69.20%	59,078	30.80%	0	0.00%	191,792	100.0%	Democratic hold
District 15	130,392	76.48%	36,010	21.12%	4,086	2.40%	170,488	100.0%	Democratic hold
District 16	217,668	71.58%	86,408	28.42%	0	0.00%	304,076	100.0%	Democratic hold
District 17	173,899	45.85%	197,845	52.16%	7,530	1.99%	379,274	100.0%	Republican hold
District 18	207,106	57.17%	155,129	42.83%	0	0.00%	362,235	100.0%	Democratic hold
District 19	192,647	51.11%	184,290	48.89%	0	0.00%	376,937	100.0%	Democratic gain
District 20	221,997	61.13%	141,151	38.87%	0	0.00%	363,148	100.0%	Democratic hold
District 21	131,930	37.86%	216,513	62.14%	0	0.00%	348,443	100.0%	Republican hold
District 22	194,450	54.56%	161,939	45.44%	0	0.00%	356,389	100.0%	Democratic gain
District 23	128,651	34.19%	247,599	65.81%	0	0.00%	376,250	100.0%	Republican hold
District 24	123,317	34.33%	235,867	65.67%	0	0.00%	359,184	100.0%	Republican hold
District 25	219,175	60.82%	141,195	39.18%	0	0.00%	360,370	100.0%	Democratic hold
District 26	209,131	65.17%	111,772	34.83%	0	0.00%	320,903	100.0%	Democratic hold
Total	4,526,587	57.20%	3,365,455	42.53%	21,635	0.27%	7,913,946	100.0%	

== District 1 ==
2024 New York's 1st congressional district election
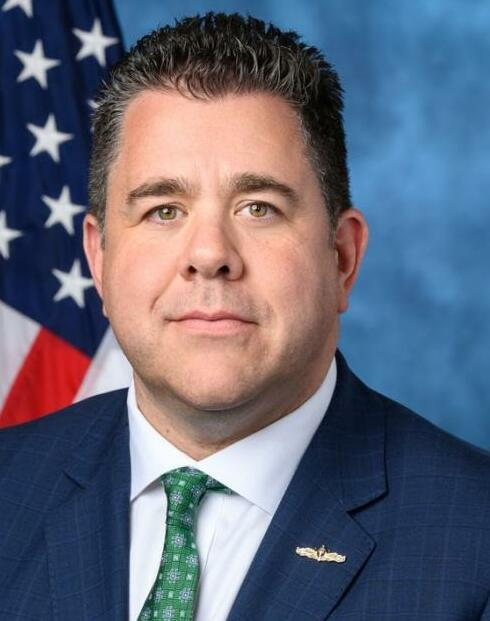

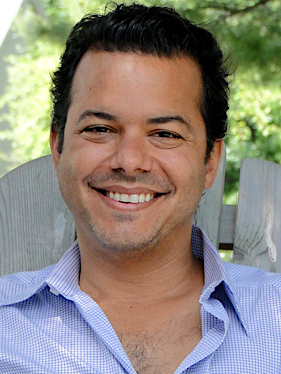
Nominee	Nick LaLota	John Avlon
Party	Republican	Democratic
Alliance	Conservative	Common Sense Suffolk
Popular vote	226,285	183,540
Percentage	55.2%	44.8%
- LaLota: 50–60% 60–70% 70–80% Avlon: 50–60% 60–70% 70–80% 80–90% Tie: 50% No votes
U.S. Representative before election
Nick LaLota
Republican
Elected U.S. Representative
Nick LaLota
Republican

The 1st district is based on the eastern end and North Shore of Long Island, including the Hamptons, the North Fork, Riverhead, Port Jefferson, Smithtown, and Huntington, all in Suffolk County. The incumbent was Republican Nick LaLota, who was elected with 55.51% of the vote in 2022. George Santos, who was expelled from Congress in December 2023, announced a Republican primary challenge to LaLota in this seat, announcing his run as a Republican during Joe Biden's 2024 State of the Union Address. On March 22, 2024, Santos announced that he was withdrawing from the Republican primary and would instead run as an Independent candidate. On April 23, 2024, Santos withdrew from the race entirely.

=== Republican primary ===
==== Nominee ====
- Nick LaLota, incumbent U.S. representative

==== Withdrawn ====
- George Santos, former U.S. representative from the 3rd district (2023) (ran as an independent)

==== Endorsements ====
Nick LaLota

U.S. executive branch officials

- Donald Trump, 45th president of the United States

U.S. representatives

- Lee Zeldin, former U.S. representative from New York's 1st congressional district (2015–2023) and nominee for governor of New York in 2022

State legislators

- Keith Brown, New York state assemblyman from the 12th District
- Michael Fitzpatrick, New York state assemblyman from the 8th District
- Jodi Giglio, New York state assemblyman from the 2nd District
- Mario Mattera, New York state senator from the 2nd District
- Anthony Palumbo, New York state senator from the 1st District
- Doug Smith, New York state assemblyman from the 5th District

Organizations

- AIPAC
- International Franchise Association
- Log Cabin Republicans PAC
- Pro-Israel America
- Republican Jewish Coalition
- With Honor Fund

==== Fundraising ====
Campaign finance reports as of June 5, 2024
Candidate	Raised	Spent	Cash on hand
Nick LaLota (R)	$2,434,752	$715,380	$1,796,934
Source: Federal Election Commission

=== Democratic primary ===
==== Nominee ====
- John Avlon, former CNN reporter and co-founder of No Labels

==== Eliminated in primary ====
- Nancy Goroff, chemist and nominee for this district in 2020

==== Withdrawn ====
- Jim Gaughran, former state senator from the 5th district (2019–2022) (endorsed Avlon)
- Craig Herskowitz, attorney and former administrative law judge (endorsed Goroff, ran for state senate)
- Kyle Hill, emergency medical technician

==== Endorsements ====
John Avlon

U.S. representatives

- Liz Cheney, WY-AL (2017-2023) (post-primary; Republican)
- Dan Goldman, incumbent U.S. representative
- Gregory Meeks, incumbent U.S. representative
- Max Rose, former U.S. representative from New York's 11th congressional district (2019–2021)
- Tom Suozzi, incumbent U.S. representative

State legislators

- Jim Gaughran, former state senator from the 5th district (2019–2022)

Political parties

- Forward Party

Organizations

- NewDem Action Fund
- WelcomePAC

Labor unions

- New York State United Teachers
- United Federation of Teachers

Individuals

- Nancy Goroff, chemist and nominee for this district in 2020
- Jonathan Haidt
Nancy Goroff

U.S. representatives

- Lois Frankel, U.S. representative from Florida (2013–present)

Organizations

- 314 Action
- EMILY's List
- Freethought Equality Fund

Political parties

- Working Families Party

==== Fundraising ====
Campaign finance reports as of June 5, 2024
Candidate	Raised	Spent	Cash on hand
John Avlon (D)	$1,757,58	$1,172,826	$584,756
Nancy Goroff (D)	$2,260,155 (Note: $1,200,000 of this total was self-funded by Goroff)	$1,665,393	$594,762
Source: Federal Election Commission

==== Results ====
Democratic primary results
Party	Candidate	Votes	%
Democratic	John Avlon	19,026	70.3
Democratic	Nancy Goroff	8,053	29.7
Total votes		27,079	100.0

=== Conservative primary ===
==== Nominee ====
- Nick LaLota, incumbent U.S. representative

==== Withdrawn or disqualified ====
- Daniel Foti, financial director (previously ran in the 3rd district)

=== Independents ===
==== Withdrawn ====
- George Santos, former Republican U.S. representative from the 3rd district (2023) (previously ran as a Republican)

=== General election ===
==== Predictions ====
Source	Ranking	As of
The Cook Political Report	Likely R	December 1, 2023
Inside Elections	Likely R	October 10, 2024
Sabato's Crystal Ball	Lean R	November 4, 2024
Elections Daily	Likely R	September 7, 2023
CNalysis	Likely R	March 1, 2024

==== Polling ====
Poll source	Date(s) administered	Sample size (Note: Key: A – all adults RV – registered voters LV – likely voters V – unclear)	Margin of error	Nick LaLota (R)	John Avlon (D)	Other	Undecided
Sienna College (Note: Poll sponsored by Newsday)	October 13–17, 2024	526 (LV)	± 4.5%	47%	44%	1% (Note: "Won't vote" with 1%)	7%
Cygnal (R) (Note: Poll sponsored by the Congressional Leadership Fund)	September 29 − October 1, 2024	400 (LV)	± 4.88%	49%	40%	–	11%
Fabrizio, Lee & Associates (R) (Note: Poll sponsored by Nick Lalota, who is running for this seat)	September 26−29, 2024	400 (LV)	± 4.9%	50%	42%	–	8%

==== Debate ====
2024 New York's 1st congressional district debate
No.	Date	Host	Moderator	Link	Republican	Democratic
Key: P Participant A Absent N Not invited I Invited W Withdrawn						
Key: P Participant A Absent N Not invited I Invited W Withdrawn					LaLota	Avlon
1	Oct. 23, 2024	News 12	Rich Barrabi		P	P

==== Results ====
2024 New York's 1st congressional district election
Party	Candidate	Votes	%
Republican	Nick LaLota	200,802	49.0
Conservative	Nick LaLota	25,483	6.2
Total	Nick LaLota (incumbent)	226,285	55.2
Democratic	John Avlon	181,647	44.3
Common Sense Suffolk	John Avlon	1,893	0.5
Total	John Avlon	183,540	44.8
Total votes		409,825	100.0
Republican hold			

== District 2 ==
2024 New York's 2nd congressional district election
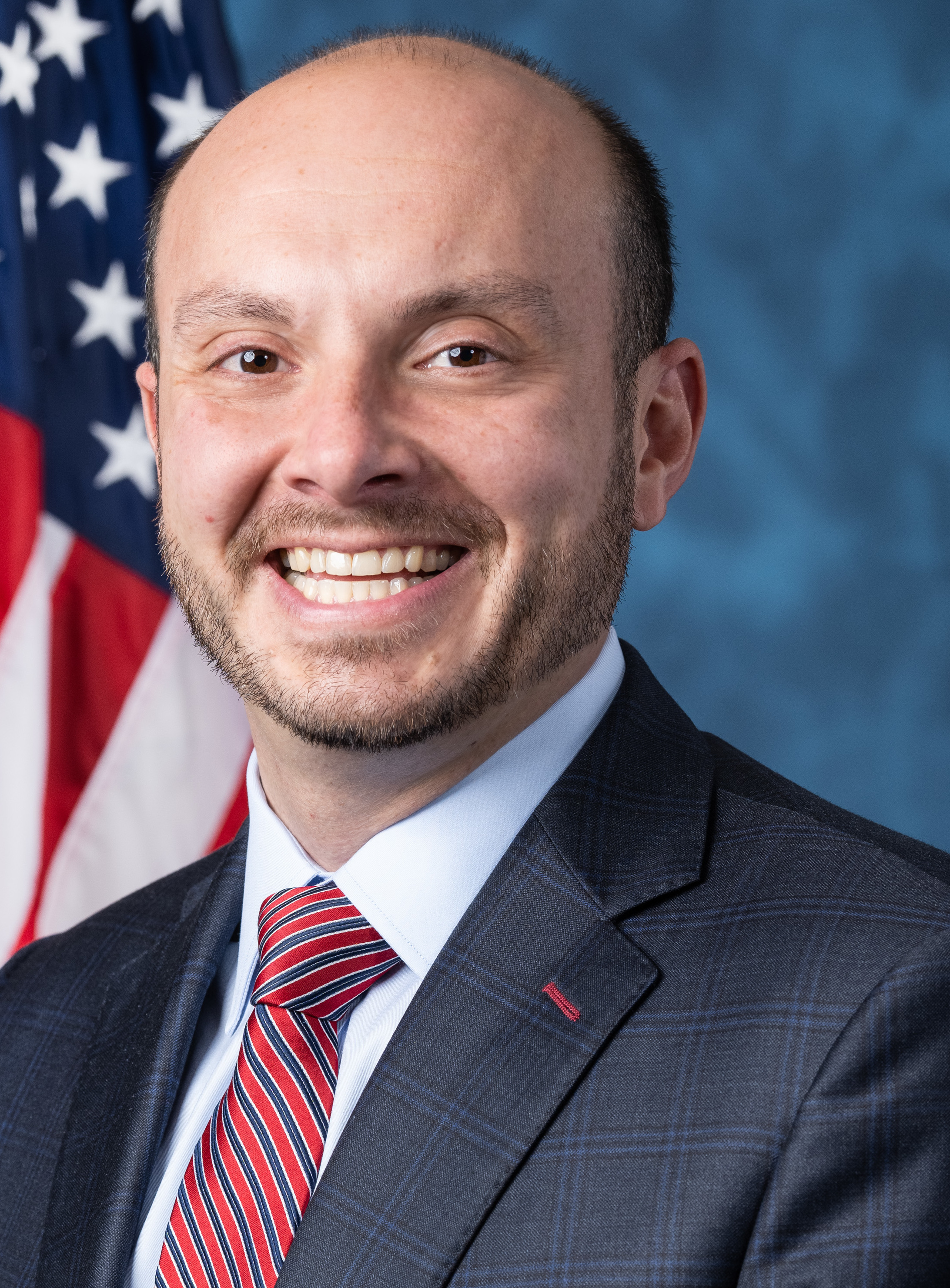

Nominee	Andrew Garbarino	Rob Lubin
Party	Republican	Democratic
Alliance	Conservative	Working Families
Popular vote	202,597	136,371
Percentage	59.8%	40.2%
- Garbarino: 50–60% 60–70% 70–80% 80–90% >90% Lubin: 50–60% 60–70% 70–80% 80–90% Tie: 50% No votes
U.S. Representative before election
Andrew Garbarino
Republican
Elected U.S. Representative
Andrew Garbarino
Republican

The 2nd district is based on the South Shore of Suffolk County, including the towns of Babylon, Islip, and most of Brookhaven all in Suffolk County, and Massapequa in Nassau County. The incumbent was Republican Andrew Garbarino, who was re-elected with 60.73% of the vote in 2022.

=== Republican primary ===
==== Nominee ====
- Andrew Garbarino, incumbent U.S. representative

==== Disqualified ====
- Shannon Stephens, attorney

==== Endorsements ====
Andrew Garbarino

Organizations

- AIPAC
- International Franchise Association
- Log Cabin Republicans PAC

Labor unions

- LiUNA! New York

==== Fundraising ====
Campaign finance reports as of June 5, 2024
Candidate	Raised	Spent	Cash on hand
Andrew Garbarino (R)	$2,514,136	$1,168,628	$1,642,58
Source: Federal Election Commission

=== Democratic primary ===
==== Nominee ====
- Rob Lubin, fashion e-commerce company founder

==== Endorsements ====
Rob Lubin

Political parties

- Working Families Party

=== Fundraising ===
Campaign finance reports as of June 5, 2024
Candidate	Raised	Spent	Cash on hand
Rob Lubin (D)	$825,040 (Note: $150,000 of this total was self-funded by Lubin)	$554,252	$270,787
Source: Federal Election Commission

=== General election ===
==== Predictions ====
Source	Ranking	As of
The Cook Political Report	Solid R	December 1, 2023
Inside Elections	Solid R	December 1, 2023
Sabato's Crystal Ball	Safe R	February 23, 2023
Elections Daily	Safe R	September 7, 2023
CNalysis	Likely R	November 16, 2023

==== Results ====
2024 New York's 2nd congressional district election
Party	Candidate	Votes	%
Republican	Andrew Garbarino	180,374	53.2
Conservative	Andrew Garbarino	22,223	6.6
Total	Andrew Garbarino (incumbent)	202,597	59.8
Democratic	Rob Lubin	129,937	38.3
Working Families	Rob Lubin	6,434	1.9
Total	Rob Lubin	136,371	40.2
Total votes		338,968	100.0
Republican hold			

== District 3 ==
2024 New York's 3rd congressional district election
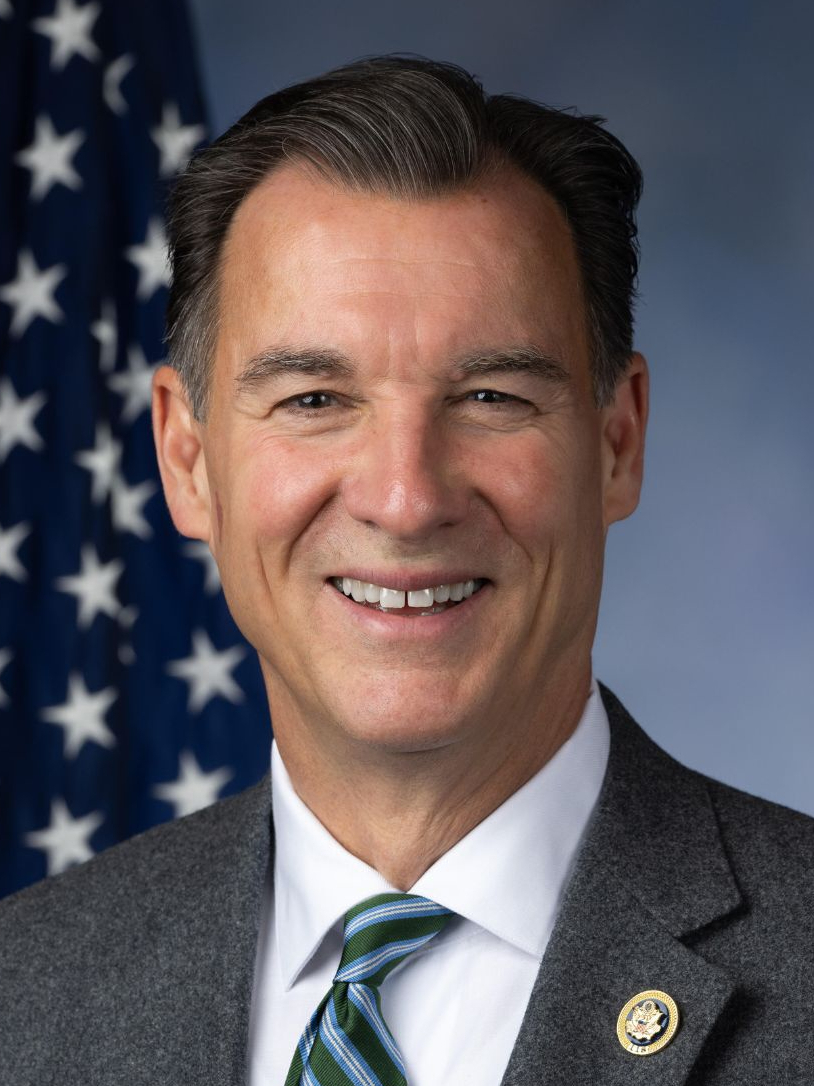

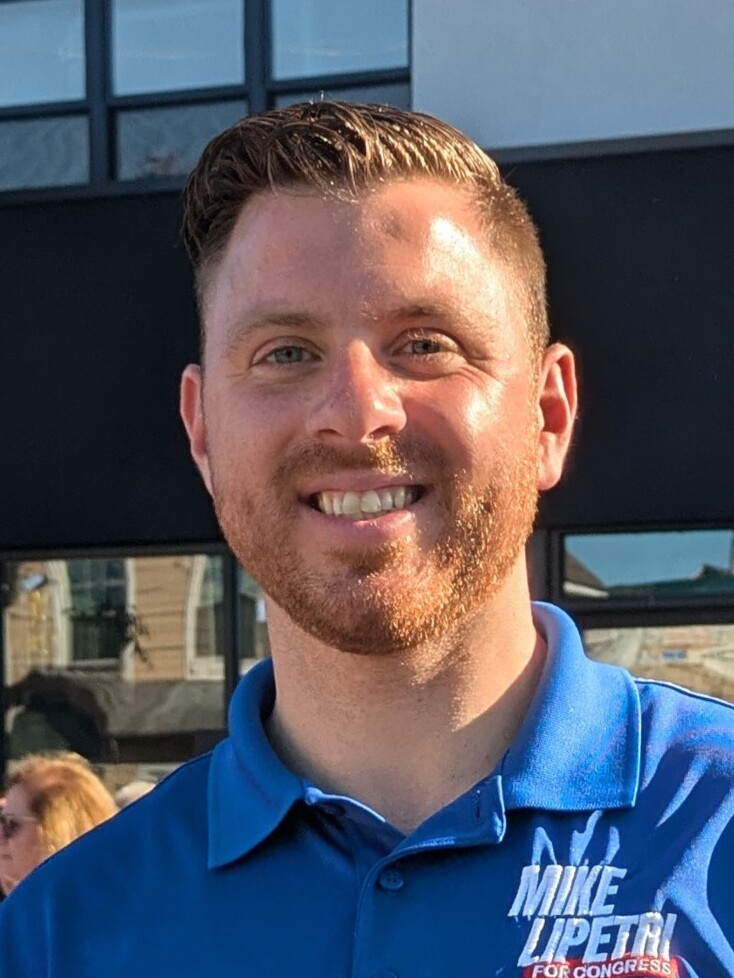
Nominee	Tom Suozzi	Mike LiPetri
Party	Democratic	Republican
Alliance	Common Sense	Conservative
Popular vote	187,651	174,694
Percentage	51.8%	48.2%
- Suozzi: 50–60% 60–70% 70–80% 80–90% >90% LiPetri: 50–60% 60–70% 70–80% 80–90% >90% Tie: 50% No votes
U.S. Representative before election
Tom Suozzi
Democratic
Elected U.S. Representative
Tom Suozzi
Democratic

The 3rd district is based on the North Shore of Nassau County, including all of the city of Glen Cove, all of the town of North Hempstead, most of the town of Oyster Bay, a small part of the town of Hempstead, and parts of Northeast Queens, including the neighborhoods of Whitestone, Beechhurst, Little Neck, and Douglaston. The incumbent was Republican George Santos, who flipped the district and was elected with 53.76% of the vote in 2022. Santos had faced heavy calls to resign following revelations that he fabricated a majority of his résumé, including from the Nassau County Republican Party.

On May 10, 2023, Santos was arrested on federal charges of fraud and money laundering.

On November 16, 2023, in light of the House Ethics Committee report finding that there was "substantial evidence" that he "violated federal criminal laws," Santos announced that he would no longer be seeking re-election. On December 1, Santos was expelled from Congress.

On February 13, 2024, former U.S. Representative Tom Suozzi defeated Republican nominee Mazi Melesa Pilip in the special election to finish Santos's term. He won election to a full term in November by 3.6%, defeating Mike LiPetri.

=== Democratic primary ===
==== Nominee ====
- Tom Suozzi, incumbent U.S. representative

==== Withdrawn ====
- Steve Behar, former staffer for then-New York city councilor Barry Grodenchik and candidate for New York City's 23rd City Council district in 2021 and 2023 (endorsed Suozzi)
- Austin Cheng, surgical center CEO (endorsed Suozzi)
- Anna Kaplan, former state senator from the 7th district and candidate for this district in 2016 (endorsed Suozzi)
- Josh Lafazan, Nassau County legislator and candidate for this district in 2022 (endorsed Suozzi)
- Zak Malamed, nonprofit executive (endorsed Suozzi)
- Will Murphy, St. John's University School of Law professor (endorsed Suozzi, ran for state assembly)

==== Declined ====
- Darius Radzius, reporter for News 12 and 1010 WINS
- Reema Rasool, marketing executive and candidate for this district in 2022
- Robert Zimmerman, Democratic National Committee member and nominee for this district in 2022

==== Endorsements ====
Tom Suozzi

U.S. representatives

- Annie Kuster, NH-02 (2013–2025)
- Pat Ryan, NY-18 (2022–present)

State legislators

- Anna Kaplan, former SD-07 (2019–2022)

Local officials

- Josh Lafazan, Nassau County's LD-18 and withdrawn candidate

Organizations

- AIPAC
- Everytown for Gun Safety Action Fund
- Natural Resources Defense Council
- New York League of Conservation Voters
- NewDem Action Fund
- Sierra Club

Labor unions

- District Council 37
- LiUNA! New York
- New York Hotel and Gaming Trades Council, AFL-CIO
- New York State Nurses Association

=== Fundraising ===
Campaign finance reports as of June 5, 2024
Candidate	Raised	Spent	Cash on hand
Tom Suozzi (D)	$7,331,976	$6,098,472	$1,296,739
Source: Federal Election Commission

=== Republican primary ===
==== Nominee ====
- Mike LiPetri, former state assemblyman from the 9th district (2019–2021) and candidate for the 2nd district in 2020

==== Disqualified ====
- Greg Hach, attorney
- Michael Mandel
- Jim Toes, financial executive

==== Withdrawn ====
- Bill Cotter, former professional boxer, podcaster and blogger for Barstool Sports
- George Santos, former U.S. representative from this district (ran as an Independent in the 1st district)
- Mike Sapraicone, businessman and retired NYPD detective (ran for U.S. Senate)

==== Declined ====
- Bruce Blakeman, Nassau County executive
- Jack Martins, state senator from the 7th district (2011–2016, 2023–present) and nominee for this district in 2016

==== Endorsements ====
Mike LiPetri

Party chapters

- Nassau County Republican Party
Mike Sapraicone (withdrawn)

U.S. senators

- Al D'Amato, former U.S. senator from New York

U.S. representatives

- George Santos, former U.S. representative from New York's 3rd congressional district (2023)

=== Fundraising ===
Campaign finance reports as of June 5, 2024
Candidate	Raised	Spent	Cash on hand
Mike LiPetri (R)	$209,181	$79,656	$134,835
Source: Federal Election Commission

=== Conservative primary ===
==== Withdrawn ====
- Daniel Foti, financial director (ran in the 1st district)

=== General election ===
==== Predictions ====
Source	Ranking	As of
The Cook Political Report	Likely D	February 29, 2024
Inside Elections	Solid D	October 10, 2024
Sabato's Crystal Ball	Likely D	February 28, 2024
Elections Daily	Likely D	February 29, 2024
CNalysis	Likely D	March 1, 2024

==== Polling ====
Poll source	Date(s) administered	Sample size	Margin of error	Tom Suozzi (D)	Mike LiPetri (R)	Other	Undecided
McLaughlin & Associates (R) (Note: Poll sponsored by the Nassau County GOP, which supports LiPetri's campaign)	July 23−25, 2024	400 (LV)	± 4.9%	51%	37%	–	12%

Hypothetical polling

Jack Martins vs. Josh Lafazan

Poll source	Date(s) administered	Sample size	Margin of error	Jack Martins (R)	Josh Lafazan (D)	Undecided
Priorities for Progress (D)	March 5–12, 2023	500 (LV)	± 4.4%	43%	36%	21%

Jack Martins vs. Robert Zimmerman

Poll source	Date(s) administered	Sample size	Margin of error	Jack Martins (R)	Robert Zimmerman (D)	Undecided
Priorities for Progress (D)	March 5–12, 2023	500 (LV)	± 4.4%	44%	41%	15%

==== Debate ====
2024 New York's 3rd congressional district debate
No.	Date	Host	Moderator	Link	Democratic	Republican
Key: P Participant A Absent N Not invited I Invited W Withdrawn						
Key: P Participant A Absent N Not invited I Invited W Withdrawn					Suozzi	LiPetri
1	Oct. 8, 2024	News 12	Rich Barrabi		P	P

==== Results ====
2024 New York's 3rd congressional district election
Party	Candidate	Votes	%
Democratic	Tom Suozzi	185,491	51.2
Common Sense Party	Tom Suozzi	2,160	0.6
Total	Tom Suozzi (incumbent)	187,651	51.8
Republican	Mike LiPetri	161,197	44.5
Conservative	Mike LiPetri	13,497	3.7
Total	Mike LiPetri	174,694	48.2
Total votes		362,344	100.0
Democratic hold			

== District 4 ==
2024 New York's 4th congressional district election
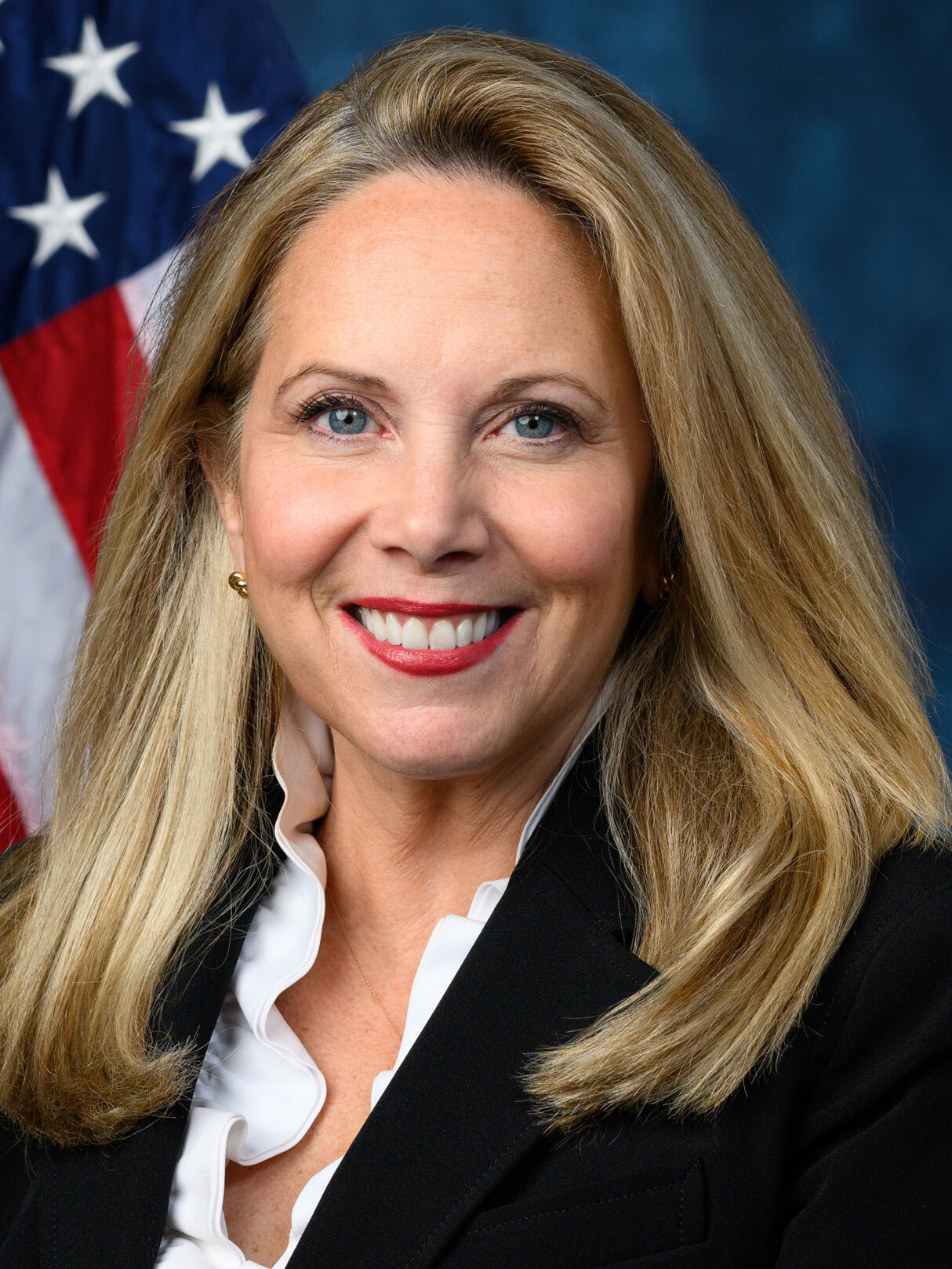

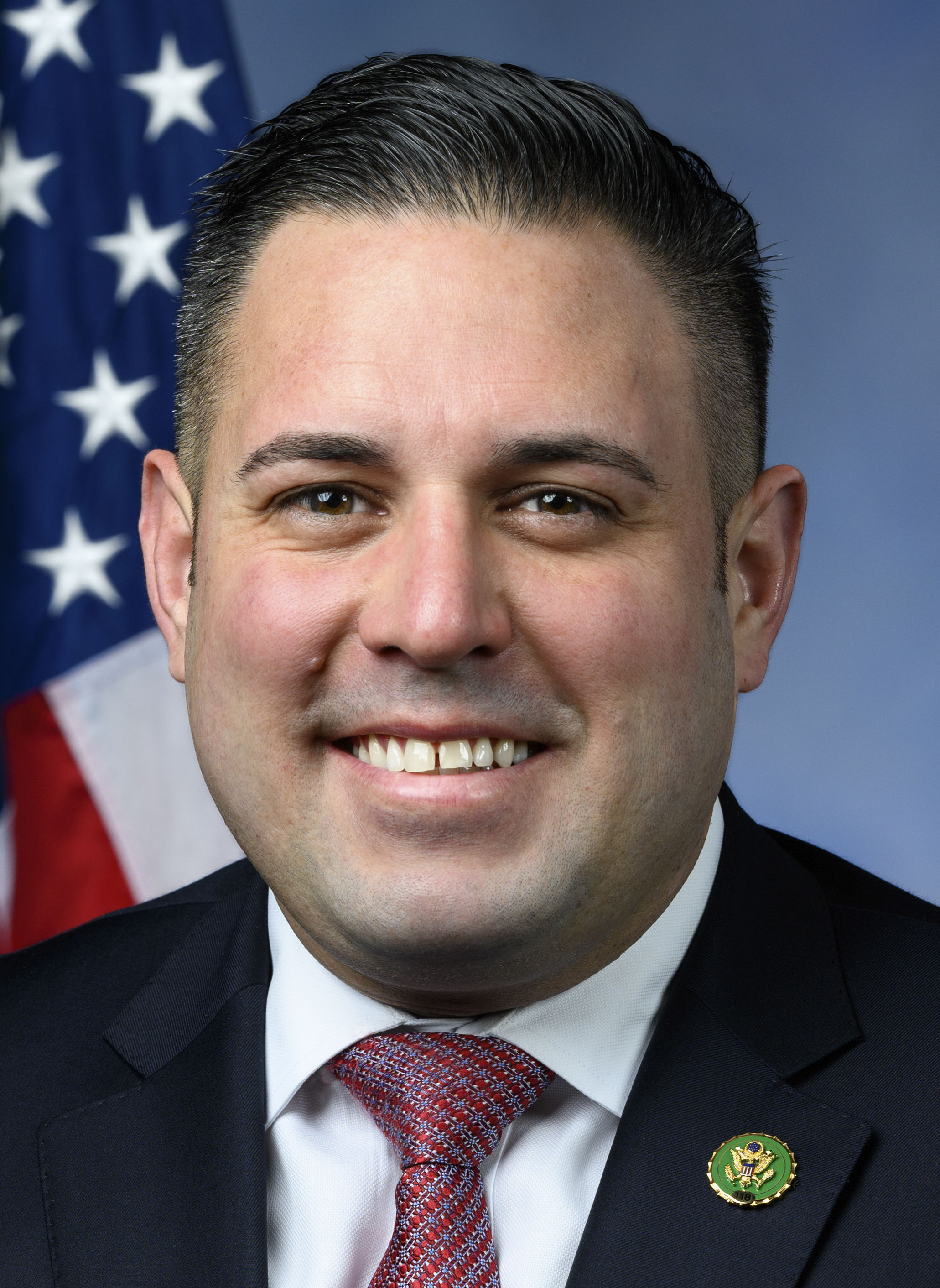
Nominee	Laura Gillen	Anthony D'Esposito
Party	Democratic	Republican
Alliance	Common Sense	Conservative
Popular vote	191,793	183,168
Percentage	51.2%	48.8%
- Gillen: 50–60% 60–70% 70–80% 80–90% >90% D'Esposito: 50–60% 60–70% 70–80% 80–90% >90% No votes
U.S. Representative before election
Anthony D'Esposito
Republican
Elected U.S. Representative
Laura Gillen
Democratic

The 4th district is based on the South Shore of Nassau County and is entirely within the town of Hempstead. The incumbent was Republican Anthony D'Esposito, who flipped the district and was elected with 51.80% of the vote in 2022.

=== Republican primary ===
==== Nominee ====
- Anthony D'Esposito, incumbent U.S. representative

==== Endorsements ====
Anthony D'Esposito

Executive branch officials

- John Bolton, United States National Security Advisor (2018–2019), United States Ambassador to the United Nations (2005–2006)
- Donald Trump, 45th president of the United States

U.S. senators

- Norm Coleman, former U.S. senator from Minnesota (2003–2009)

U.S. representatives

- Lee Zeldin, former U.S. representative for NY-1 (2015–2023), 2022 Republican nominee for governor of New York

Organizations

- AIPAC
- International Franchise Association
- Pro-Israel America
- Republican Jewish Coalition

=== Democratic primary ===
==== Nominee ====
- Laura Gillen, former town supervisor (Note: Mayor) of Hempstead and nominee for this district in 2022

==== Withdrawn ====
- Sarah Hughes, attorney and 2002 Olympic champion figure skater
- Kevin Thomas, state senator from the 6th district

==== Declined ====
- Laura Curran, former Nassau County executive (2018–2021) (endorsed Gillen)

==== Endorsements ====
Laura Gillen

U.S. representatives

- Lois Frankel, U.S. representative from Florida (2013–present)
- Steve Israel, former U.S. representative from New York (2001–2017)
- Carolyn McCarthy, former U.S. representative from New York (1997–2015)

Statewide officials

- Gretchen Whitmer, governor of Michigan (2019–present)

Local officials

- Laura Curran, former Nassau County executive (2018–2021)

Organizations

- Council for a Livable World
- DCCC Red to Blue
- EMILY's List
- End Citizens United
- Everytown for Gun Safety (post-primary)
- Jewish Democratic Council of America (post-primary)
- League of Conservation Voters
- New York League of Conservation Voters
- NewDem Action Fund
- Reproductive Freedom for All
- Vote Mama

==== Polling ====
Poll source	Date(s) administered	Sample size	Margin of error	Laura Gillen	Kevin Thomas	Undecided
Public Policy Polling (D) (Note: Poll commissioned by Gillen's campaign)	October 23–24, 2023	464 (LV)	?	53%	10%	37%

=== General election ===
==== Predictions ====
Source	Ranking	As of
CNalysis	Likely D (flip)	November 4, 2024
The Cook Political Report	Lean D (flip)	November 1, 2024
Inside Elections	Tilt D (flip)	October 31, 2024
Sabato's Crystal Ball	Lean D (flip)	February 28, 2024
Elections Daily	Lean D (flip)	February 29, 2024

=== Polling ===
Poll source	Date(s) administered	Sample size	Margin of error	Anthony D'Esposito (R)	Laura Gillen (D)	Undecided
Gotham Polling & Analytics	October 11–19, 2024	734 (LV)	–	46%	45%	6%
Sienna College	October 13–17, 2024	532 (LV)	± 4.4%	41%	53%	6% (Note: "Won't vote" with 1%)
GQR (D) (Note: This poll was sponsored by House Majority PAC)	August 26–30, 2024	400 (LV)	–	47%	50%	3%
McLaughlin & Associates (R) (Note: This poll was sponsored by D'Esposito's campaign)	August 11–13, 2024	400 (LV)	–	48%	42%	10%
Change Research (D) (Note: Poll sponsored by Economic Security Project Action, a Democratic group)	July 9−12, 2024	713 (LV)	± 4.0%	39%	46%	14%
McLaughlin & Associates (R)	May 21–23, 2024	400 (LV)	± 4.9%	45%	38%	17%

Hypothetical polling

Generic Republican vs. generic Democrat

Poll source	Date(s) administered	Sample size	Margin of error	Generic Republican	Generic Democrat	Undecided
Change Research (D)	July 9−12, 2024	713 (LV)	± 4.0%	40%	46%	14%

=== Fundraising ===
Campaign finance reports as of June 30, 2024
Candidate	Raised	Spent	Cash on hand
Anthony D'Esposito (R)	$3,374,825	$1,225,748	$2,171,543
Laura Gillen (D)	$3,249,102	$730,410	$3,518,691
Source: Federal Election Commission

==== Results ====
2024 New York's 4th congressional district election
Party	Candidate	Votes	%
Democratic	Laura Gillen	190,602	50.8
Common Sense	Laura Gillen	1,191	0.3
Total	Laura Gillen	191,793	51.2
Republican	Anthony D'Esposito	169,651	45.2
Conservative	Anthony D'Esposito	13,517	3.6
Total	Anthony D'Esposito (incumbent)	183,168	48.8
Total votes		374,961	100.0
Democratic gain from Republican			

== District 5 ==
2024 New York's 5th congressional district election
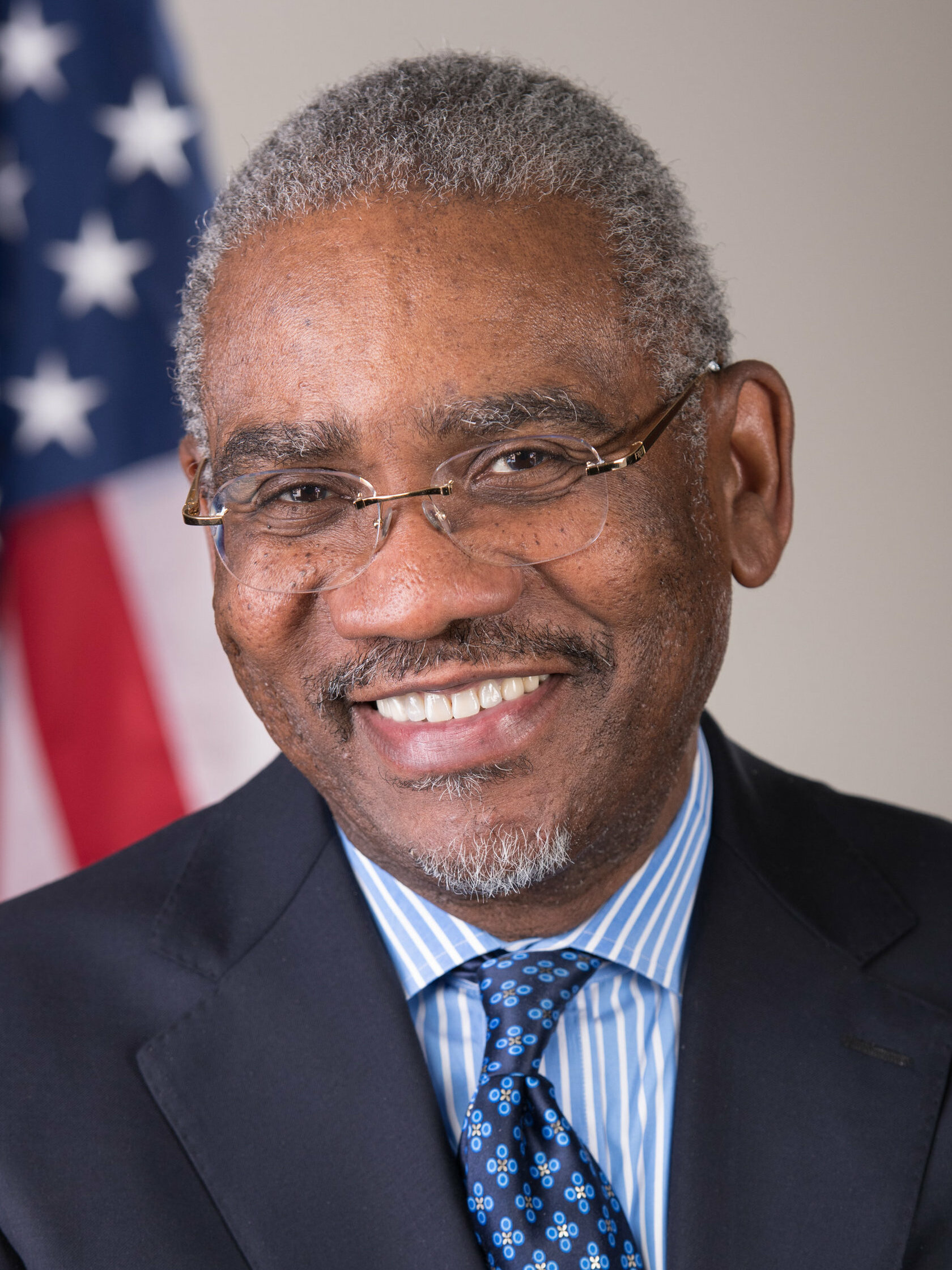

Nominee	Gregory Meeks	Paul King
Party	Democratic	Republican
Alliance		Conservative
Popular vote	168,425	62,529
Percentage	72.9%	27.1%
- Meeks: 50–60% 60–70% 70–80% 80–90% >90% King: 50–60% 60–70% 70–80% 80–90% No votes
U.S. Representative before election
Gregory Meeks
Democratic
Elected U.S. Representative
Gregory Meeks
Democratic

The 5th district is based in Southeast Queens, including the neighborhoods of Jamaica, Hollis, Laurelton, Richmond Hill, Ozone Park, Howard Beach, and the Rockaways. The incumbent was Democrat Gregory Meeks, who was re-elected with 75.21% of the vote in 2022.

=== Democratic primary ===
==== Nominee ====
- Gregory Meeks, incumbent U.S. representative

==== Endorsements ====
Gregory Meeks

Organizations

- AIPAC
- Democratic Majority for Israel
- Jim Owles Liberal Democratic Club
- League of Conservation Voters
- New York League of Conservation Voters
- Planned Parenthood Action Fund
- Population Connection Action Fund
- Pro-Israel America
- Stonewall Democratic Club of New York City

Labor unions

- District Council 37
- LiUNA! New York
- New York State Nurses Association

==== Fundraising ====
Campaign finance reports as of June 5, 2024
Candidate	Raised	Spent	Cash on hand
Gregory Meeks (D)	$2,280,501	$1,777,715	$2,231,367
Source: Federal Election Commission

=== Republican primary ===
==== Nominee ====
- Paul King, businessman and nominee for this district in 2022

==== Endorsements ====
Paul King

Local officials

- Joann Ariola, New York City councilor from the 32nd district (2022–present)

Individuals

- Gerard Kassar, chair of the New York State Conservative Party (2019–present)

Organizations

- New York Young Republican Club

Political parties

- New York State Conservative Party
- Queens County Republican Party

==== Fundraising ====
Campaign finance reports as of March 31, 2024
Candidate	Raised	Spent	Cash on hand
Paul King (R)	$9,039	$8,488	$4,965
Source: Federal Election Commission

=== General election ===
==== Prediction ====
Source	Ranking	As of
The Cook Political Report	Solid D	December 1, 2023
Inside Elections	Solid D	December 1, 2023
Sabato's Crystal Ball	Safe D	February 23, 2023
Elections Daily	Safe D	September 7, 2023
CNalysis	Solid D	November 16, 2023

==== Results ====
2024 New York's 5th congressional district election
Party	Candidate	Votes	%
Democratic	Gregory Meeks (incumbent)	168,425	72.9
Republican	Paul King	56,689	24.6
Conservative	Paul King	5,840	2.5
Total	Paul King	62,529	27.1
Total votes		230,954	100.0
Democratic hold			

== District 6 ==
2024 New York's 6th congressional district election
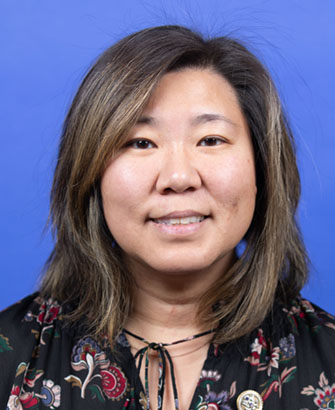

Nominee	Grace Meng	Thomas Zmich
Party	Democratic	Republican
Alliance		Conservative
Popular vote	120,205	74,559
Percentage	60.7%	37.6%
- Meng: 50–60% 60–70% 70–80% Zmich: 50–60% 60–70% No votes
U.S. Representative before election
Grace Meng
Democratic
Elected U.S. Representative
Grace Meng
Democratic

The 6th district is based in Central and Eastern Queens, including the neighborhoods of Woodside, Jackson Heights, Elmhurst, Kew Gardens, Flushing, Bayside, and Fresh Meadows. The incumbent was Democrat Grace Meng, who was re-elected with 63.95% of the vote in 2022.

=== Democratic primary ===
==== Nominee ====
- Grace Meng, incumbent U.S. representative

==== Endorsements ====
Grace Meng

Organizations

- AIPAC
- Democratic Majority for Israel
- Everytown for Gun Safety Action Fund
- Feminist Majority PAC
- Jim Owles Liberal Democratic Club
- New York League of Conservation Voters
- Planned Parenthood Action Fund
- Population Connection Action Fund
- Pro-Israel America
- Stonewall Democratic Club of New York City
- Vote Mama

Labor unions

- District Council 37
- LiUNA! New York
- New York State Nurses Association

==== Fundraising ====
Campaign finance reports as of June 5, 2024
Candidate	Raised	Spent	Cash on hand
Grace Meng (D)	$1,316,054	$1,243,213	$780,667
Source: Federal Election Commission

=== Republican primary ===
==== Nominee ====
- Thomas Zmich, bricklayer and nominee for this district in 2020 and 2022

==== Endorsements ====
Thomas Zmich

Political parties

- Queens County Republican Party

==== Fundraising ====
Campaign finance reports as of June 5, 2024
Candidate	Raised	Spent	Cash on hand
Thomas Zmich (R)	$5,533	$5,599	$262
Source: Federal Election Commission

=== General election ===
==== Prediction ====
Source	Ranking	As of
The Cook Political Report	Solid D	December 1, 2023
Inside Elections	Solid D	December 1, 2023
Sabato's Crystal Ball	Safe D	February 23, 2023
Elections Daily	Safe D	September 7, 2023
CNalysis	Solid D	November 16, 2023

==== Results ====
2024 New York's 6th congressional district election
Party	Candidate	Votes	%
Democratic	Grace Meng (incumbent)	120,205	60.7
Republican	Thomas Zmich	69,654	35.2
Conservative	Thomas Zmich	4,905	2.5
Total	Thomas Zmich	74,559	37.6
Truth	Joseph Chou	3,272	1.7
Total votes		198,036	100.0
Democratic hold			

== District 7 ==
2024 New York's 7th congressional district election
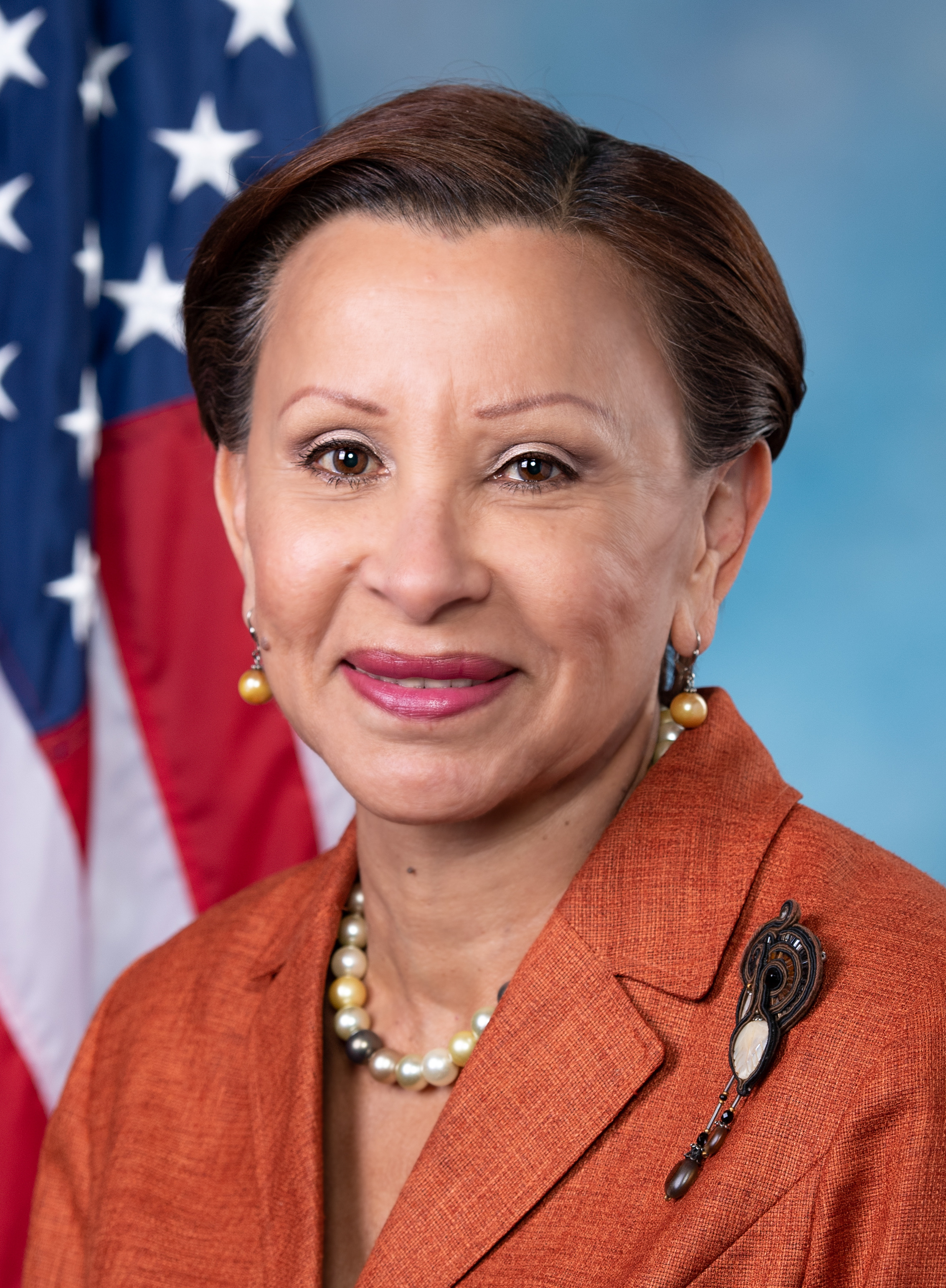

Nominee	Nydia Velázquez	William Kregler
Party	Democratic	Republican
Alliance	Working Families	Conservative
Popular vote	172,795	48,435
Percentage	78.1%	21.9%
- Velázquez: 50–60% 60–70% 70–80% 80–90% >90% Kregler: 50–60% 60–70% 70–80% >90% Tie: 50% No votes
U.S. Representative before election
Nydia Velázquez
Democratic
Elected U.S. Representative
Nydia Velázquez
Democratic

The 7th district is based in Brooklyn and Queens, including the neighborhoods of Clinton Hill, Williamsburg, Greenpoint, Bushwick, Woodhaven, Maspeth, Sunnyside, and Long Island City. The incumbent was Democrat Nydia Velázquez, who was elected with 80.69% of the vote in 2022.

=== Democratic primary ===
==== Nominee ====
- Nydia Velázquez, incumbent U.S. representative

==== Endorsements ====
Nydia Velázquez

Organizations

- Feminist Majority PAC
- Friends of the Earth Action
- Latino Victory Fund
- League of Conservation Voters
- New York League of Conservation Voters
- Planned Parenthood Action Fund
- Stonewall Democratic Club of New York City

Labor unions

- District Council 37
- New York State Nurses Association

Political parties

- Working Families Party

==== Fundraising ====
Campaign finance reports as of June 5, 2024
Candidate	Raised	Spent	Cash on hand
Nydia Velasquez (D)	$387,562	$418,787	$272,025
Source: Federal Election Commission

=== Republican primary ===
==== Nominee ====
- William Kregler, police officer

==== Endorsements ====
William Kregler

Political parties

- Queens County Republican Party

==== Fundraising ====
Campaign finance reports as of June 5, 2024
Candidate	Raised	Spent	Cash on hand
William Kregler (R)	$7,212 (Note: $1,127 of this total was self-funded by Kregler)	$4,239	$2,973
Source: Federal Election Commission

=== General election ===
==== Prediction ====
Source	Ranking	As of
The Cook Political Report	Solid D	December 1, 2023
Inside Elections	Solid D	December 1, 2023
Sabato's Crystal Ball	Safe D	February 23, 2023
Elections Daily	Safe D	September 7, 2023
CNalysis	Solid D	November 16, 2023

==== Results ====
2024 New York's 7th congressional district election
Party	Candidate	Votes	%
Democratic	Nydia Velázquez	145,141	65.6
Working Families	Nydia Velázquez	27,654	12.5
Total	Nydia Velázquez (incumbent)	172,795	78.1
Republican	William Kregler	43,052	19.5
Conservative	William Kregler	5,383	2.4
Total	William Kregler	48,435	21.9
Total votes		221,230	100.0
Democratic hold			

== District 8 ==
2024 New York's 8th congressional district election
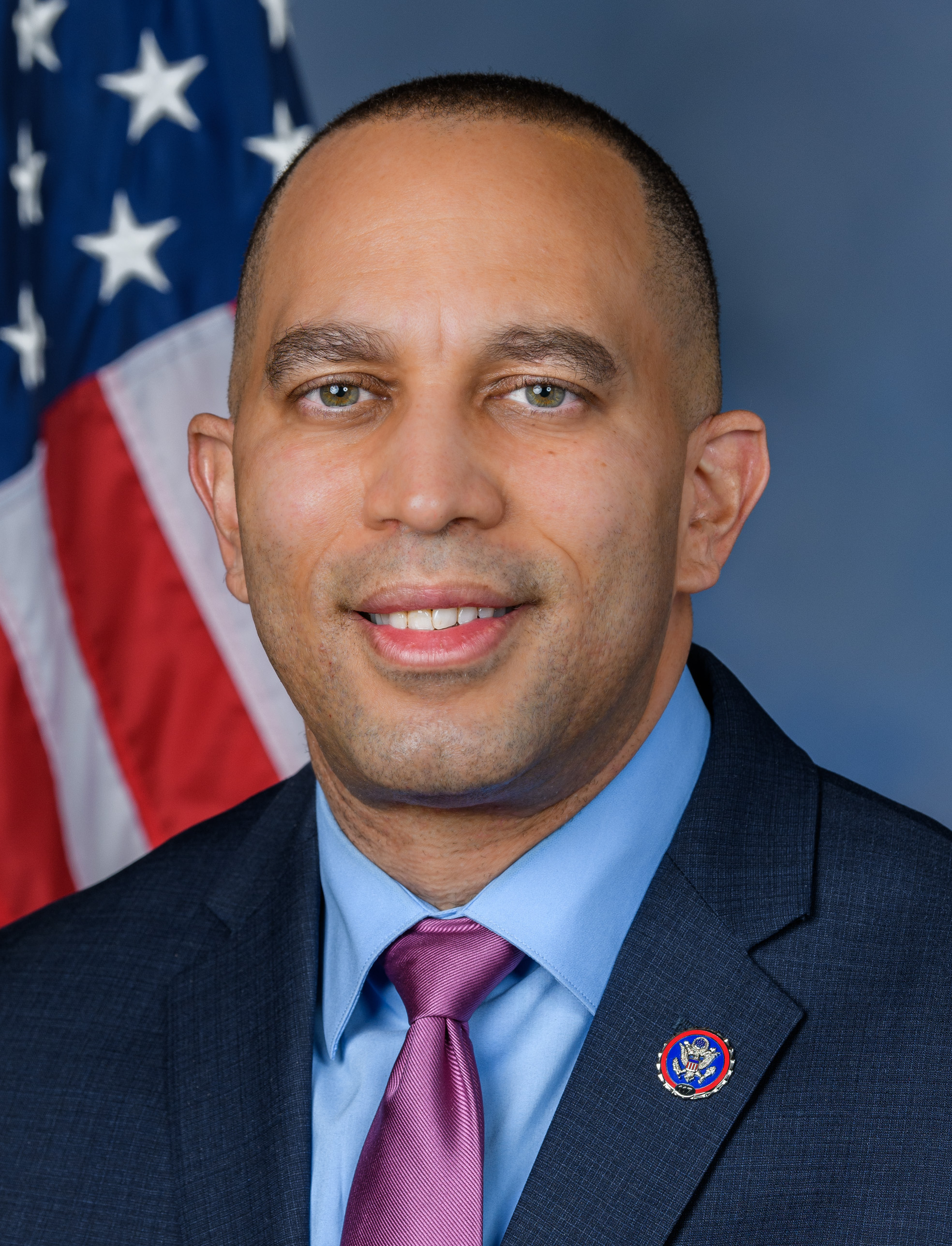

Nominee	Hakeem Jeffries	John Delaney
Party	Democratic	Republican
Alliance		Conservative
Popular vote	168,036	54,863
Percentage	75.4%	24.6%
- Jeffries: 50–60% 60–70% 70–80% 80–90% >90% Delaney: 50–60% 60–70% 70–80% 80–90% No votes
U.S. Representative before election
Hakeem Jeffries
Democratic
Elected U.S. Representative
Hakeem Jeffries
Democratic

The incumbent was Democrat Hakeem Jeffries, who was re-elected with 71.72% of the vote in 2022.

=== Democratic primary ===
==== Nominee ====
- Hakeem Jeffries, incumbent U.S. representative and House minority leader

==== Endorsements ====
Hakeem Jeffries

Organizations

- AIPAC
- Asian American Action Fund
- Democratic Majority for Israel
- Everytown for Gun Safety Action Fund
- National Organization for Women PAC
- Planned Parenthood Action Fund
- Pro-Israel America
- Stonewall Democratic Club of New York City

Labor unions

- District Council 37
- LiUNA! New York
- National Union of Healthcare Workers

=== Republican primary ===
==== Nominee ====
- John Delaney

=== Conservative primary ===
==== Nominee ====
- John Delaney

==== Fundraising ====
Campaign finance reports as of June 5, 2024
Candidate	Raised	Spent	Cash on hand
Hakeem Jeffries (D)	$16,441,742	$10,580,304	$8,077,663
Source: Federal Election Commission

=== General election ===
==== Prediction ====
Source	Ranking	As of
The Cook Political Report	Solid D	December 1, 2023
Inside Elections	Solid D	December 1, 2023
Sabato's Crystal Ball	Safe D	February 23, 2023
Elections Daily	Safe D	September 7, 2023
CNalysis	Solid D	November 16, 2023

==== Results ====
2024 New York's 8th congressional district election
Party	Candidate	Votes	%
Democratic	Hakeem Jeffries (incumbent)	168,036	75.4
Republican	John Delaney	48,369	21.7
Conservative	John Delaney	6,494	2.9
Total	John Delaney	54,863	24.6
Total votes		222,899	100.0
Democratic hold			

== District 9 ==
2024 New York's 9th congressional district election
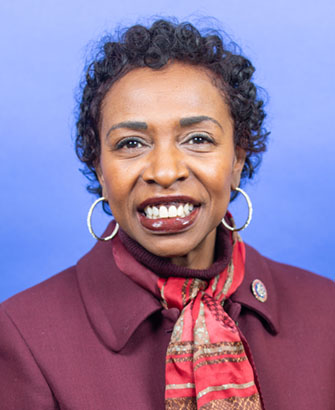

Nominee	Yvette Clarke	Menachem Raitport
Party	Democratic	Republican
Alliance		Conservative
Popular vote	173,207	60,064
Percentage	74.3%	25.7%
- Clarke: 50–60% 60–70% 70–80% 80–90% >90% Raitport: 50–60% 60–70% 70–80% 80–90% >90% No votes
U.S. Representative before election
Yvette Clarke
Democratic
Elected U.S. Representative
Yvette Clarke
Democratic

The incumbent was Democrat Yvette Clarke, who was re-elected with 81.52% of the vote in 2022.

=== Democratic primary ===
==== Nominee ====
- Yvette Clarke, incumbent U.S. representative

==== Endorsements ====
Yvette Clarke

Organizations

- AIPAC
- Feminist Majority PAC
- Stonewall Democratic Club of New York City

Labor unions

- District Council 37
- LiUNA! New York

==== Fundraising ====
Campaign finance reports as of June 5, 2024
Candidate	Raised	Spent	Cash on hand
Yvette Clarke (D)	$597,897	$597,553	$63,048
Source: Federal Election Commission

=== General election ===
==== Prediction ====
Source	Ranking	As of
The Cook Political Report	Solid D	December 1, 2023
Inside Elections	Solid D	December 1, 2023
Sabato's Crystal Ball	Safe D	February 23, 2023
Elections Daily	Safe D	September 7, 2023
CNalysis	Solid D	November 16, 2023

==== Results ====
2024 New York's 9th congressional district election
Party	Candidate	Votes	%
Democratic	Yvette Clarke (incumbent)	173,207	74.3
Republican	Menachem Raitport	51,458	22.0
Conservative	Menachem Raitport	8,606	3.7
Total	Menachem Raitport	60,064	25.7
Total votes		233,271	100.0
Democratic hold			

== District 10 ==
2024 New York's 10th congressional district election
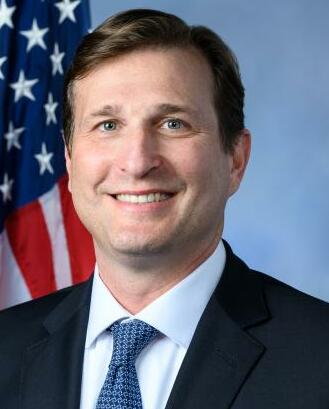

Nominee	Dan Goldman	Alex Dodenhoff
Party	Democratic	Republican
Popular vote	206,206	37,555
Percentage	82.3%	15.0%
- Goldman: 50–60% 60–70% 70–80% 80–90% >90% Zmich: 50–60% 60–70% No votes
U.S. Representative before election
Dan Goldman
Democratic
Elected U.S. Representative
Dan Goldman
Democratic

The 10th district is based in Lower Manhattan and Brooklyn, including the neighborhoods of Park Slope, Windsor Terrace, Gowanus, Brooklyn Heights, Cobble Hill, Red Hook, Sunset Park, the Lower East Side, Greenwich Village, and the Financial District. The incumbent was Democrat Dan Goldman, who was elected with 84.04% of the vote in 2022.

=== Democratic primary ===
==== Nominee ====
- Dan Goldman, incumbent U.S. representative

==== Eliminated in primary ====
- Bruno Grandsard, venture capital executive
- Evan Hutchison, political consultant

==== Endorsements ====
Dan Goldman

Organizations

- AIPAC
- Democratic Majority for Israel
- Jewish Democratic Council of America
- Joint Action Committee for Political Affairs
- League of Conservation Voters
- New York League of Conservation Voters
- Pro-Israel America
- Stonewall Democratic Club of New York City
- Vote Common Good

Labor unions

- District Council 37
- LiUNA! New York
- New York State AFL-CIO

==== Fundraising ====
Campaign finance reports as of June 5, 2024
Candidate	Raised	Spent	Cash on hand
Dan Goldman (D)	$2,909,293	$1,524,206	$1,422,424
Bruno Grandsard (D)	$24,950	$8,679	$15,692
Evan Hutchison (D)	$20,174 (Note: $1,597 of this total was self-funded by Hutchison)	$17,833	$2,341
Source: Federal Election Commission

==== Results ====
2024 Democratic primary results Goldman: 30–40%; 40–50%; 50–60%; 60–70%; 70–80%; 80–90%; 90–100%; Hutchison: 30–40%; 40–50%; 50–60%; 60–70%; 80–90%; No votes

Democratic primary results
Party	Candidate	Votes	%
Democratic	Dan Goldman (incumbent)	22,708	66.1
Democratic	Evan Hutchison	8,073	23.5
Democratic	Bruno Grandsard	3,599	10.5
Total votes		34,380	100.0

=== Republican primary ===
==== Nominee ====
- Alex Dodenhoff

==== Endorsements ====
Alex Dodenhoff

Political parties

- Manhattan Republican Party

=== General election ===
==== Prediction ====
Source	Ranking	As of
The Cook Political Report	Solid D	December 1, 2023
Inside Elections	Solid D	December 1, 2023
Sabato's Crystal Ball	Safe D	February 23, 2023
Elections Daily	Safe D	September 7, 2023
CNalysis	Solid D	November 16, 2023

==== Results ====
2024 New York's 10th congressional district election
Party	Candidate	Votes	%
Democratic	Dan Goldman	206,206	82.3
Republican	Alex Dodenhoff	37,555	15.0
Conservative	Paul Briscoe	6,747	2.7
Total votes		250,508	100.0
Democratic hold			

== District 11 ==
2024 New York's 11th congressional district election
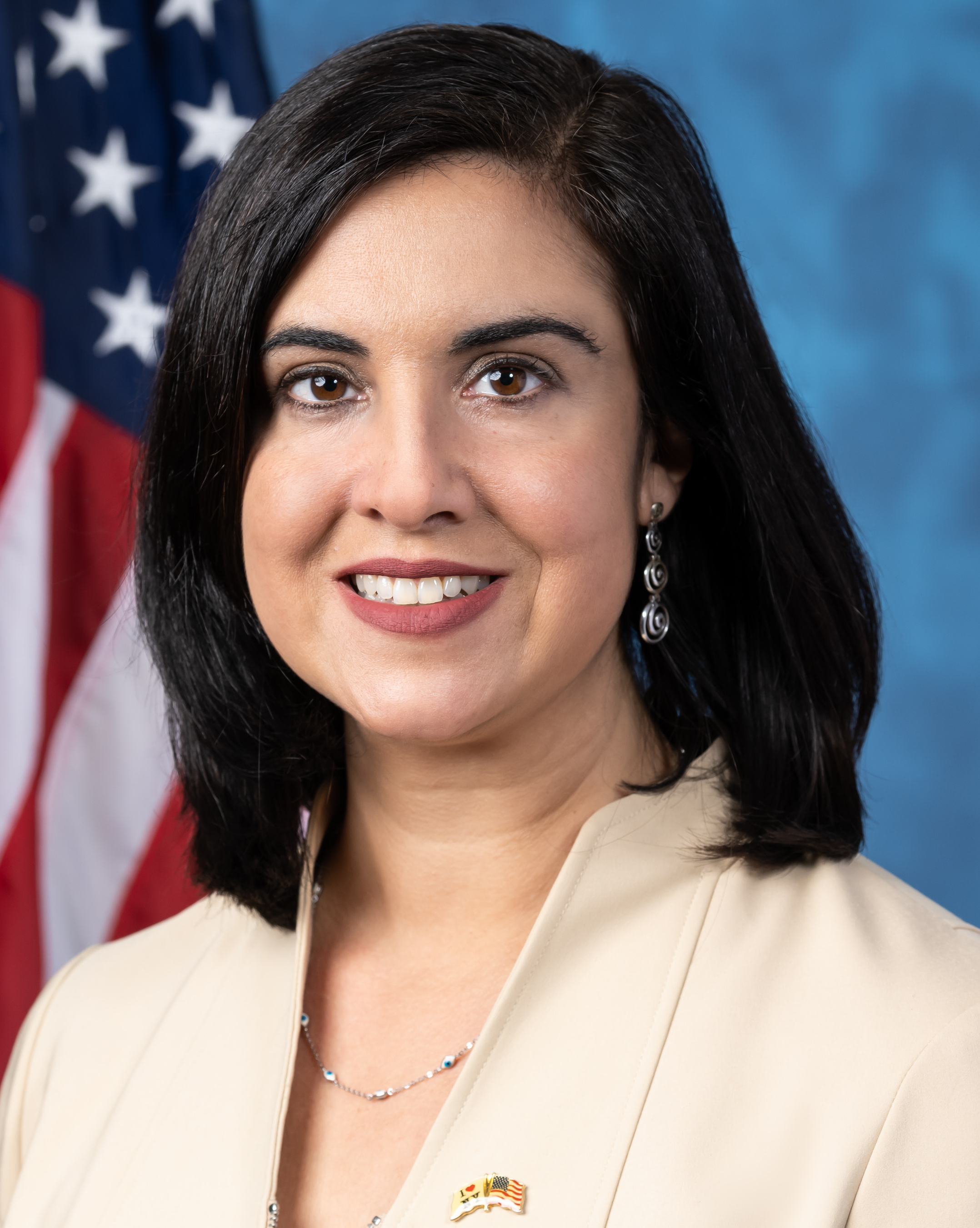

Nominee	Nicole Malliotakis	Andrea Morse
Party	Republican	Democratic
Alliance	Conservative
Popular vote	167,099	93,586
Percentage	64.1%	35.9%
- Malliotakis: 50–60% 60–70% 70–80% 80–90% >90% Morse: 50–60% 60–70% 70–80% 80–90% >90% No votes
U.S. Representative before election
Nicole Malliotakis
Republican
Elected U.S. Representative
Nicole Malliotakis
Republican

The incumbent was Republican Nicole Malliotakis, who was re-elected with 61.77% of the vote in 2022.

=== Republican primary ===
==== Nominee ====
- Nicole Malliotakis, incumbent U.S. representative

==== Endorsements ====
Nicole Malliotakis

Organizations

- AIPAC
- Huck PAC
- Log Cabin Republicans PAC
- Pro-Israel America

Labor unions

- LiUNA! New York

==== Fundraising ====
Campaign finance reports as of June 5, 2024
Candidate	Raised	Spent	Cash on hand
Nicole Malliotakis (R)	$2,266,877	$1,124,793	$1,192,402
Source: Federal Election Commission

=== Democratic primary ===
==== Nominee ====
- Andrea Morse, attorney

==== Disqualified ====
- Sarah Blas, consultant and community organizer

==== Endorsements ====
Andrea Morse

Party chapters

- Staten Island Democratic Party

==== Fundraising ====
Campaign finance reports as of June 5, 2024
Candidate	Raised	Spent	Cash on hand
Andrea Morse (D)	$119,003	$68,023	$50,980
Source: Federal Election Commission

=== General election ===
==== Prediction ====
Source	Ranking	As of
The Cook Political Report	Solid R	December 1, 2023
Inside Elections	Solid R	December 1, 2023
Sabato's Crystal Ball	Safe R	February 23, 2023
Elections Daily	Safe R	September 7, 2023
CNalysis	Solid R	November 16, 2023

==== Results ====
2024 New York's 11th congressional district election
Party	Candidate	Votes	%
Republican	Nicole Malliotakis	153,105	58.7
Conservative	Nicole Malliotakis	13,994	5.4
Total	Nicole Malliotakis (incumbent)	167,099	64.1
Democratic	Andrea Morse	93,586	35.9
Total votes		260,685	100.0
Republican hold			

== District 12 ==
2024 New York's 12th congressional district election
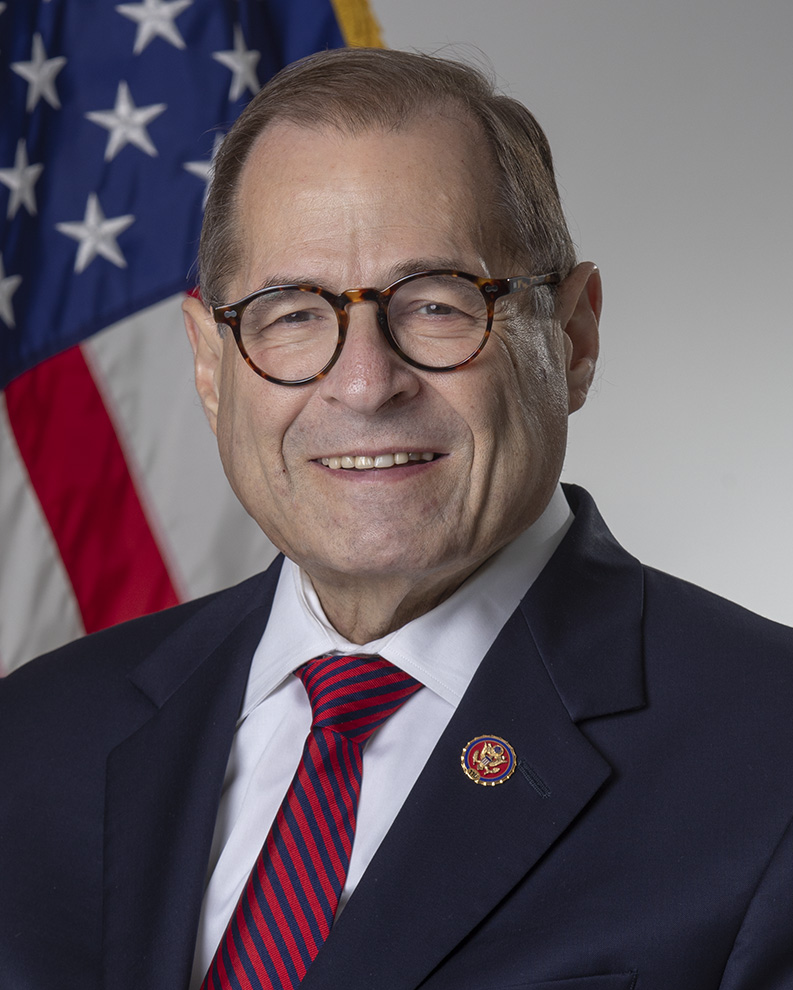

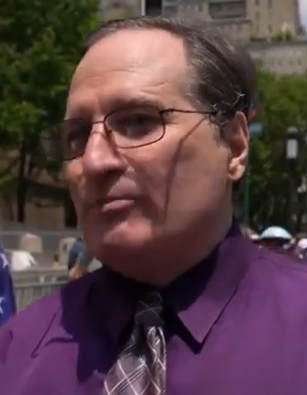
Nominee	Jerry Nadler	Michael Zumbluskas
Party	Democratic	Republican
Alliance	Working Families
Popular vote	260,165	62,989
Percentage	80.5%	19.5%
- Nadler: 50–60% 60–70% 70–80% 80–90% >90% No votes
U.S. Representative before election
Jerry Nadler
Democratic
Elected U.S. Representative
Jerry Nadler
Democratic

The 12th district is entirely based in Manhattan, comprising the Upper West Side, Upper East Side, Midtown, Hell's Kitchen, Chelsea, Murray Hill, and Gramercy. The incumbent was Democrat Jerry Nadler, who was re-elected with 81.76% of the vote in 2022.

=== Democratic primary ===
==== Nominee ====
- Jerry Nadler, incumbent U.S. representative

==== Endorsements ====
Jerry Nadler

U.S representatives

- Gabby Giffords, U.S. representative from Arizona's 8th congressional district (2007–2012)

Organizations

- Bend the Arc
- Everytown for Gun Safety Action Fund
- Feminist Majority PAC
- Giffords
- J Street PAC
- Jewish Democratic Council of America
- Jim Owles Liberal Democratic Club
- League of Conservation Voters
- New York League of Conservation Voters
- Planned Parenthood Action Fund
- Population Connection Action Fund
- Stonewall Democratic Club of New York City

Labor unions

- Association of Flight Attendants
- District Council 37
- LiUNA! New York
- New York State Nurses Association
- United Farm Workers

Political parties

- Working Families Party

==== Fundraising ====
Campaign finance reports as of June 5, 2024
Candidate	Raised	Spent	Cash on hand
Jerry Nadler (D)	$848,795	$647,515	$216,004
Source: Federal Election Commission

=== Republican primary ===
==== Nominee ====
- Michael Zumbluskas, resource management analyst and nominee for this district in 2022

==== Endorsements ====
Michael Zumbluskas

Political parties

- Manhattan Republican Party

=== General election ===
==== Prediction ====
Source	Ranking	As of
The Cook Political Report	Solid D	December 1, 2023
Inside Elections	Solid D	December 1, 2023
Sabato's Crystal Ball	Safe D	February 23, 2023
Elections Daily	Safe D	September 7, 2023
CNalysis	Solid D	November 16, 2023

==== Results ====
2024 New York's 12th congressional district election
Party	Candidate	Votes	%
Democratic	Jerry Nadler	243,111	75.2
Working Families	Jerry Nadler	17,054	5.3
Total	Jerry Nadler (incumbent)	260,165	80.5
Republican	Michael Zumbluskas	62,989	19.5
Total votes		323,154	100.0
Democratic hold			

== District 13 ==
2024 New York's 13th congressional district election
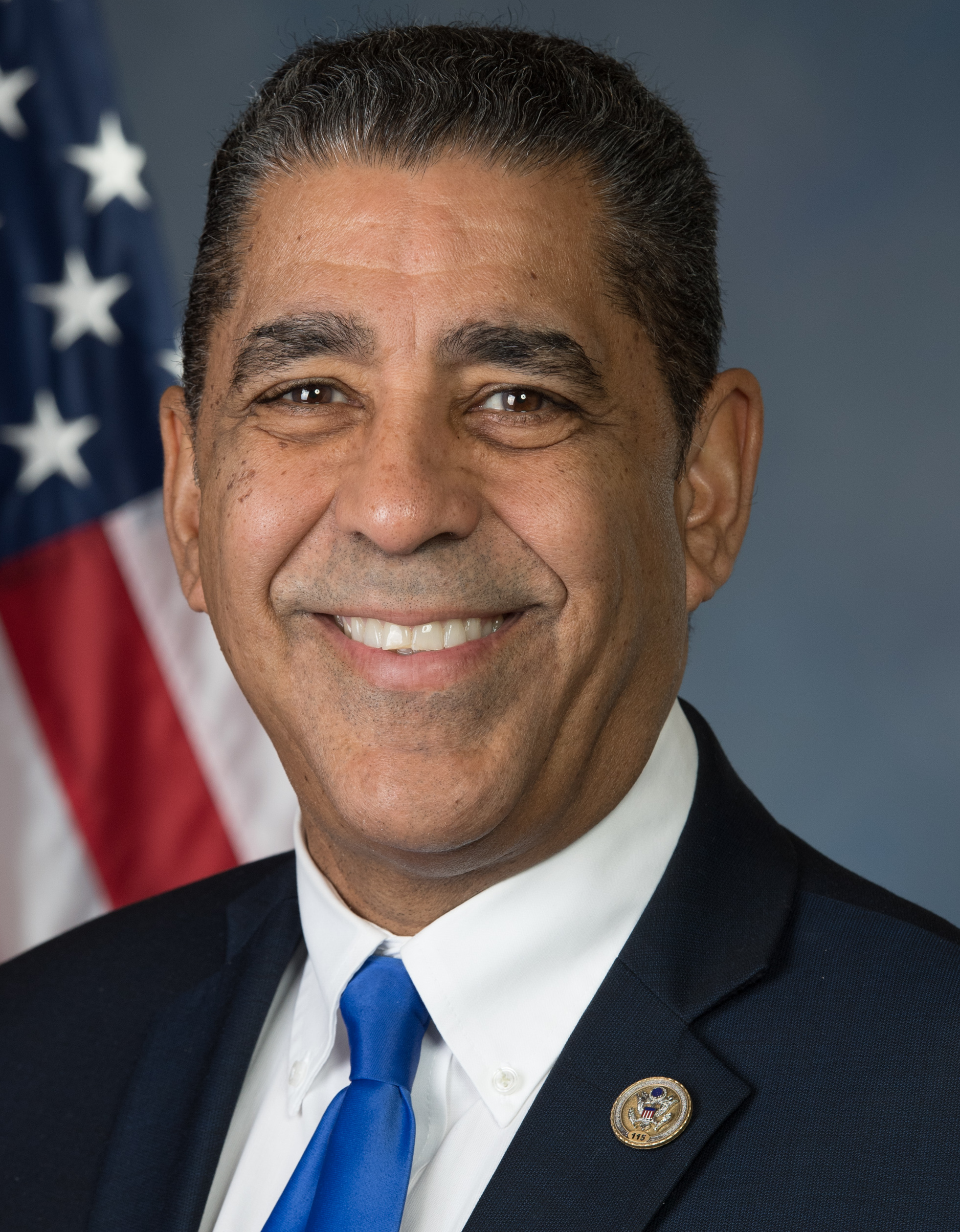

Nominee	Adriano Espaillat	Ruben Vargas
Party	Democratic	Republican
Alliance		Conservative
Popular vote	181,800	35,822
Percentage	83.5%	16.5%
- Espaillat: 50–60% 60–70% 70–80% 80–90% >90% No votes
U.S. Representative before election
Adriano Espaillat
Democratic
Elected U.S. Representative
Adriano Espaillat
Democratic

The 13th district is based in Upper Manhattan and the Northwest Bronx, including the neighborhoods of Harlem, Morningside Heights, Spanish Harlem, Hamilton Heights, Washington Heights, Inwood, Marble Hill, Fordham, Kingsbridge, and Bedford Park. The incumbent was Democrat Adriano Espaillat, who ran unopposed in 2022.

=== Democratic primary ===
==== Nominee ====
- Adriano Espaillat, incumbent U.S. representative

==== Endorsements ====
Adriano Espaillat

Organizations

- AIPAC
- Democratic Majority for Israel
- Friends of the Earth Action
- Jim Owles Liberal Democratic Club
- Latino Victory Fund
- League of Conservation Voters
- New York League of Conservation Voters
- Population Connection Action Fund

Labor unions

- District Council 37
- LiUNA! New York

==== Fundraising ====
Campaign finance reports as of June 5, 2024
Candidate	Raised	Spent	Cash on hand
Adriano Espaillat (D)	$979,684	$490,572	$587,853
Source: Federal Election Commission

=== Republican primary ===
==== Nominee ====
- Ruben Vargas

==== Endorsements ====
Ruben Vargas

Political parties

- Manhattan Republican Party

=== General election ===
==== Prediction ====
Source	Ranking	As of
The Cook Political Report	Solid D	December 1, 2023
Inside Elections	Solid D	December 1, 2023
Sabato's Crystal Ball	Safe D	February 23, 2023
Elections Daily	Safe D	September 7, 2023
CNalysis	Solid D	November 16, 2023

==== Results ====
2024 New York's 13th congressional district election
Party	Candidate	Votes	%
Democratic	Adriano Espaillat (incumbent)	181,800	83.5
Republican	Ruben Vargas	32,071	14.7
Conservative	Ruben Vargas	3,751	1.7
Total	Ruben Vargas	35,822	16.5
Total votes		217,622	100.0
Democratic hold			

== District 14 ==
2024 New York's 14th congressional district election
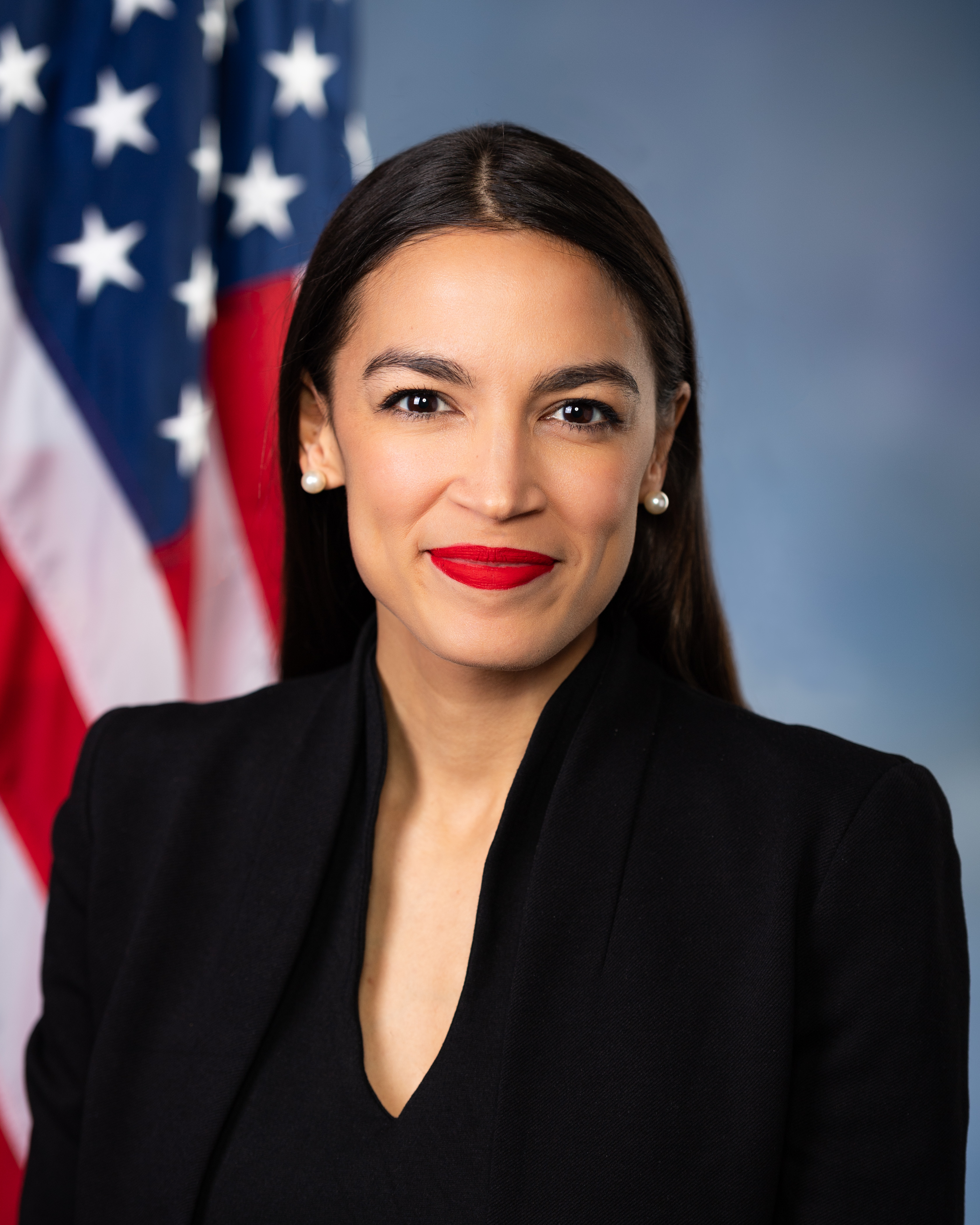

Nominee	Alexandria Ocasio-Cortez	Tina Forte
Party	Democratic	Republican
Alliance	Working Families	Conservative
Popular vote	132,714	59,078
Percentage	69.2%	30.8%
- Ocasio-Cortez: 50–60% 60–70% 70–80% 80–90% >90% Forte: 50–60% 60–70% 70–80% >90% Tie: 50% No votes
U.S. Representative before election
Alexandria Ocasio-Cortez
Democratic
Elected U.S. Representative
Alexandria Ocasio-Cortez
Democratic

The 14th district is based in North Queens and the East Bronx, including the neighborhoods of Corona, East Elmhurst, Astoria, College Point, Hunts Point, Castle Hill, Throggs Neck, Parkchester, Country Club, Co-Op City, and City Island. The incumbent was Democrat Alexandria Ocasio-Cortez, who was re-elected with 70.72% of the vote in 2022.

=== Democratic primary ===
==== Nominee ====
- Alexandria Ocasio-Cortez, incumbent U.S. representative

==== Eliminated in primary ====
- Marty Dolan, financial adviser

==== Endorsements ====
Alexandria Ocasio-Cortez

Organizations

- Feminist Majority PAC
- Friends of the Earth Action
- The Jewish Vote
- Jim Owles Liberal Democratic Club
- Justice Democrats
- National Women's Political Caucus
- New York City Democratic Socialists of America
- New York League of Conservation Voters
- Peace Action
- People's Action
- Progressive Democrats of America
- Stonewall Democratic Club of New York City
- Sunrise Movement

Labor unions

- District Council 37
- New York State Nurses Association
- United Auto Workers

Political parties

- Working Families Party
Marty Dolan

Organizations

- Job Creators Network

==== Fundraising ====
Campaign finance reports as of June 5, 2024
Candidate	Raised	Spent	Cash on hand
Marty Dolan (D)	$373,200 (Note: $292,500 of this total was self-funded by Dolan)	$366,417	$6,782
Alexandria Ocasio-Cortez (D)	$8,181,315	$8,212,325	$5,120,894
Source: Federal Election Commission

==== Results ====
Democratic primary results
Party	Candidate	Votes	%
Democratic	Alexandria Ocasio-Cortez (incumbent)	19,070	82.1
Democratic	Marty Dolan	4,149	17.9
Total votes		23,219	100.0

=== Republican primary ===
==== Nominee ====
- Tina Forte, social media influencer and nominee for this district in 2022

==== Endorsements ====
Tina Forte

Political parties

- Queens County Republican Party

==== Fundraising ====
Campaign finance reports as of June 5, 2024
Candidate	Raised	Spent	Cash on hand
Tina Forte (R)	$812,892	$803,107	$14,818
Source: Federal Election Commission

=== General election ===
==== Prediction ====
Source	Ranking	As of
The Cook Political Report	Solid D	December 1, 2023
Inside Elections	Solid D	December 1, 2023
Sabato's Crystal Ball	Safe D	February 23, 2023
Elections Daily	Safe D	September 7, 2023
CNalysis	Solid D	November 16, 2023

==== Results ====
2024 New York's 14th congressional district election
Party	Candidate	Votes	%
Democratic	Alexandria Ocasio-Cortez	118,477	61.8
Working Families	Alexandria Ocasio-Cortez	14,237	7.4
Total	Alexandria Ocasio-Cortez (incumbent)	132,714	69.2
Republican	Tina Forte	54,157	28.2
Conservative	Tina Forte	4,921	2.6
Total	Tina Forte	59,078	30.8
Total votes		191,792	100.0
Democratic hold			

== District 15 ==
2024 New York's 15th congressional district election
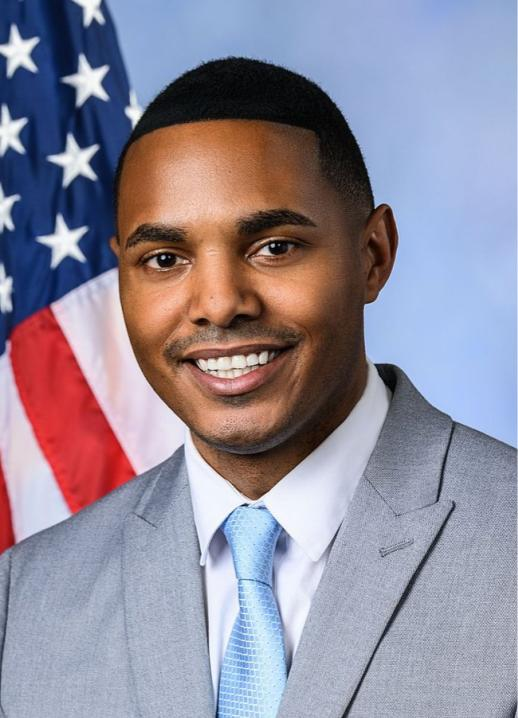

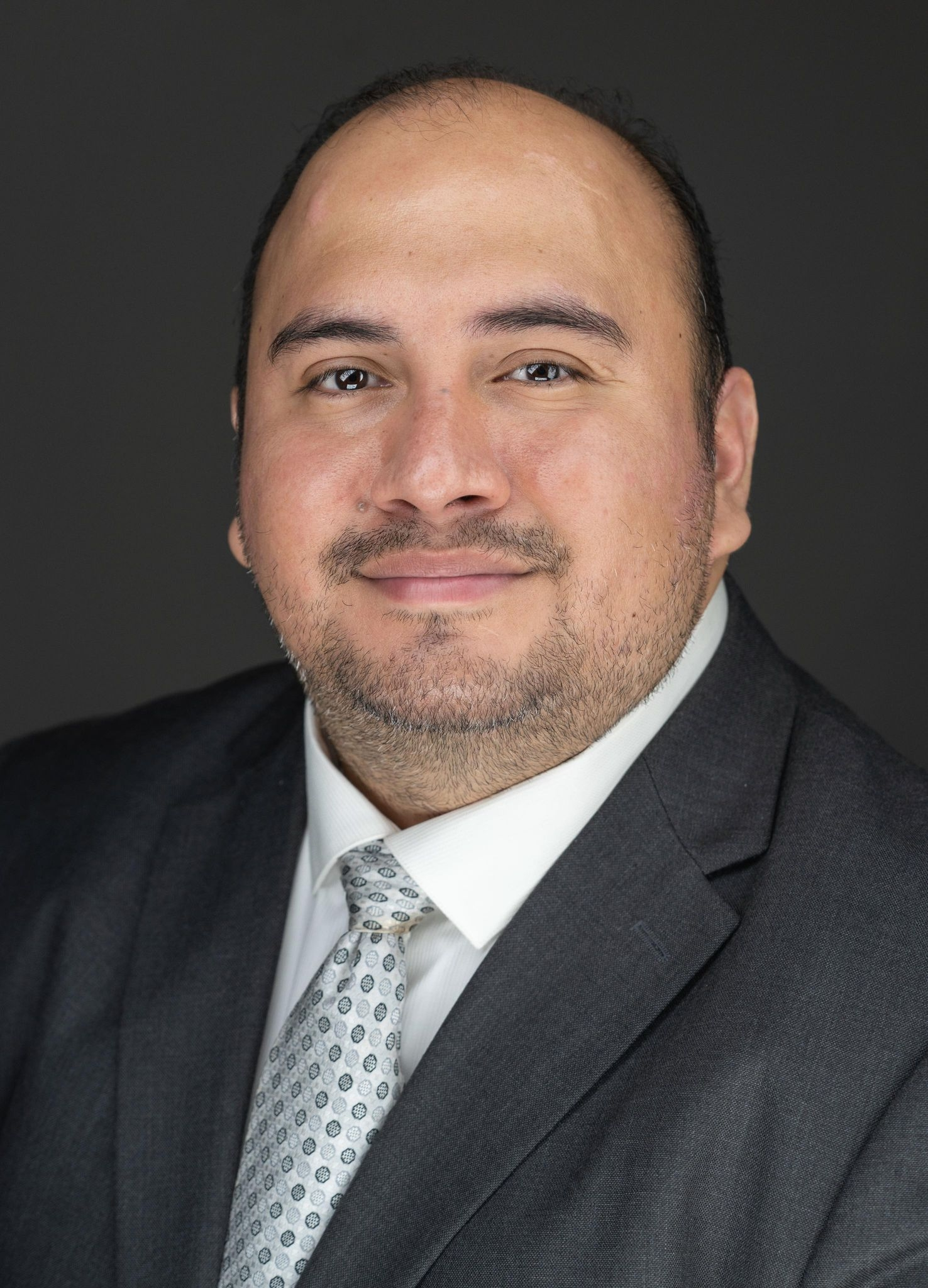
Nominee	Ritchie Torres	Gonzalo Duran
Party	Democratic	Republican
Alliance		Conservative
Popular vote	130,392	36,010
Percentage	76.5%	21.1%
- Torres: 40–50% 50–60% 60–70% 70–80% 80–90% >90% Duran: 50–60% 60–70% Tie: 50% No votes
U.S. Representative before election
Ritchie Torres
Democratic
Elected U.S. Representative
Ritchie Torres
Democratic

The 15th district is based in the West Bronx, including the neighborhoods of Mott Haven, Melrose, Morrisania, Highbridge, Tremont, West Farms, Belmont, Norwood, Woodlawn Heights, Riverdale, and Spuyten Duyvil. The incumbent was Democrat Ritchie Torres, who was elected with 82.79% of the vote in 2022.

=== Democratic primary ===
==== Nominee ====
- Ritchie Torres, incumbent U.S. representative

==== Endorsements ====
Ritchie Torres

Individuals

- Kelley Robinson, president of Human Rights Campaign

Organizations

- AIPAC
- Democratic Majority for Israel
- Human Rights Campaign
- Jewish Democratic Council of America
- League of Conservation Voters
- LGBTQ+ Victory Fund
- Population Connection Action Fund
- Pro-Israel America
- Stonewall Democratic Club of New York City

Labor unions

- District Council 37
- LiUNA! New York

==== Fundraising ====
Campaign finance reports as of June 5, 2024
Candidate	Raised	Spent	Cash on hand
Ritchie Torres (D)	$6,911,582	$1,312,419	$9,448,565
Source: Federal Election Commission

=== Republican primary ===
==== Nominee ====
- Gonzalo Duran, nonprofit CEO and former Marine

=== Independent and third-party candidates ===
==== Independents ====
===== Declared =====
- Jose Vega, activist

==== Fundraising ====
Campaign finance reports as of June 5, 2024
Candidate	Raised	Spent	Cash on hand
Jose Vega (I)	$68,446	$63,061	$5,385
Source: Federal Election Commission

=== General election ===
==== Predictions ====
Source	Ranking	As of
The Cook Political Report	Solid D	December 1, 2023
Inside Elections	Solid D	December 1, 2023
Sabato's Crystal Ball	Safe D	February 23, 2023
Elections Daily	Safe D	September 7, 2023
CNalysis	Solid D	November 16, 2023

==== Results ====
2024 New York's 15th congressional district election
Party	Candidate	Votes	%
Democratic	Ritchie Torres (incumbent)	130,392	76.5
Republican	Gonzalo Duran	32,494	19.0
Conservative	Gonzalo Duran	3,516	2.1
Total	Gonzalo Duran	36,010	21.1
Independent	Jose Vega	4,086	2.4
Total votes		170,488	100.0
Democratic hold			

== District 16 ==
2024 New York's 16th congressional district election
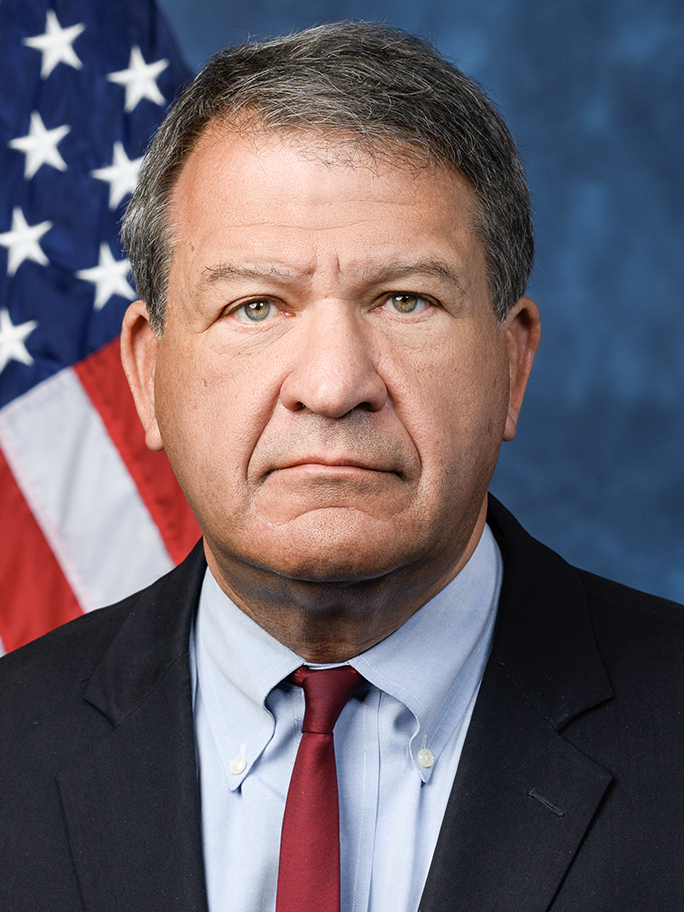

Nominee	George Latimer	Miriam Flisser
Party	Democratic	Republican
Popular vote	217,668	86,408
Percentage	71.6%	28.4%
- Latimer: 50–60% 60–70% 70–80% 80–90% >90% Flisser: 50–60% 60–70% 70–80% No votes
U.S. Representative before election
Jamaal Bowman
Democratic
Elected U.S. Representative
George Latimer
Democratic

The 16th district is based in southern Westchester County, including Yonkers, White Plains, New Rochelle, and Rye. It also includes Co-op City in the Bronx. The incumbent was Democrat Jamaal Bowman, who was re-elected with 64.30% of the vote in 2022. He faced a challenge in the Democratic primary from George Latimer, the Westchester County executive. Miriam Flisser was the Republican nominee.

=== Democratic primary ===
Incumbent U.S. Representative Jamaal Bowman, who was accused of being antisemitic and had been a frequent critic of U.S. support for Israel amidst the Gaza-Israel conflict, was challenged by pro-Israel Westchester County Executive George Latimer in the Democratic primary. The New York Times branded the contest "a marquee showcase of [the Democratic] party's divisions over the Israel-Hamas war".

The primary was the most expensive House of Representatives primary in U.S. history, with over $14 million in outside spending benefiting Latimer's campaign. Much of the outside spending came from groups affiliated with the pro-Israel American Israel Public Affairs Committee. Latimer defeated Bowman, 58.59% to 41.41%.

==== Nominee ====
- George Latimer, Westchester County executive (2018–present) and former state senator from the 37th district (2013–2017)

==== Eliminated in primary ====
- Jamaal Bowman, incumbent U.S. representative

==== Withdrawn ====
- Marty Dolan, financial adviser (ran in the 14th district)
- Michael Gerald, pastor and Westchester County deputy corrections commissioner (endorsed Latimer)

==== Endorsements ====
Jamaal Bowman

U.S. senators

- Bernie Sanders, U.S. senator from Vermont (Independent) (2007–present)
- Elizabeth Warren, U.S. senator from Massachusetts (2013–present)

U.S. representatives

- Pete Aguilar, chair of the House Democratic Caucus and U.S. representative from California (2015–present)
- Cori Bush, U.S. representative from Missouri's 1st congressional district (2021–2025)
- Katherine Clark, House minority whip and U.S. representative from Massachusetts's 5th congressional district (2021–present)
- Yvette Clarke, U.S. representative from New York (2007–present)
- Hakeem Jeffries, House minority leader and U.S. representative from New York's 8th congressional district (2013-present)
- Alexandria Ocasio-Cortez, U.S. representative from New York's 14th congressional district (2019–present)
- Ilhan Omar, U.S. representative from MN-5 (2019–present)
- Rashida Tlaib, U.S. representative from Michigan (2019–present)
- Nydia Velázquez, U.S. representative from New York's 7th congressional district (1993-present)

State legislators

- Jamaal Bailey, state senator from the 36th District (2017–present)
- Gustavo Rivera, state senator from the 33rd District (2011–present)

Local officials

- Shahana Hanif, New York city councilmember from the 39th district (2022–present)
- Brad Lander, New York City comptroller (2022–present)
- Chi Ossé, New York city councilmember from the 36th district (2022–present)
- Kevin Riley, New York city councilmember from the 12th district (2021–present)
- Jumaane Williams, New York City public advocate (2019–present)
- 11 other members of the New York City Council

Individuals

- Zanagee Artis, climate activist

Organizations

- 350.org Action
- Center for Biological Diversity Action
- Citizen Action of New York
- Congressional Black Caucus PAC
- Congressional Progressive Caucus PAC
- Democratic Socialists of America New York City Chapter
- Food & Water Action
- Friends of the Earth Action
- IfNotNow
- ~~J Street PAC~~
- Jewish Voice for Peace Action fund
- The Jewish Vote
- Jim Owles Liberal Democratic Club
- Justice Democrats
- League of Conservation Voters
- Make the Road Action
- Our Revolution
- Peace Action
- People's Action
- Planned Parenthood Action Fund
- Population Connection Action Fund
- Progressive Democrats of America
- Sierra Club
- Sunrise Movement
- Working Families Party

Labor unions

- 1199SEIU United Healthcare Workers East
- District Council 37
- National Nurses United
- New York State Nurses Association
- United Auto Workers
George Latimer

Federal officials

- Hillary Clinton, former U.S. secretary of state (2009–2013), former U.S. senator from New York (2001–2009), and 2016 Democratic nominee for president

U.S. representatives

- Eliot Engel, former U.S. representative from this district (1989–2021)
- Josh Gottheimer, U.S. representative from New Jersey's 5th congressional district (2017-present)
- Mondaire Jones, former U.S. representative from New York's 17th congressional district (2021–2023)
- Nita Lowey, former U.S. representative from New York (1989–2021)

Statewide officials

- David Paterson, former governor of New York (2008–2010)

State legislators

- Stacey Pheffer Amato, state assemblymember from the 23rd district (2017–Present)
- Chris Burdick, state assemblymember from the 93rd district (2021–present)
- Jeff Dinowitz, state assemblymember from the 81st district (1994–present)
- Peter Harckham, state senator from the 40th district (2019–present)
- Shelley Mayer, state senator from the 37th district (2018–present)
- Amy Paulin, state assemblymember from the 88th district (2001–present)
- Jenifer Rajkumar, state assemblymember from the 38th district (2021–present)
- MaryJane Shimsky, state assemblymember from the 92nd district (2023–present)

Local officials

- Steve Bellone, former Suffolk County executive (2012–2023)
- Eric Dinowitz, New York City councilman from the 11th district (2022–present)
- Thomas Roach, mayor of White Plains (2011–present)
- Mike Spano, mayor of Yonkers (2012–present)
- Kalman Yeger, New York city councilmember from the 44th district (2018–present)

Party chapters

- 11 municipal Democratic committees (Note: Eastchester, Rye City, Rye Town, White Plains, Pelham, Mamaroneck, Harrison, Scarsdale, Greenburgh, Yonkers, and Mount Vernon)

Organizations

- AIPAC
- Democratic Majority for Israel
- Jewish Democratic Council of America
- Moms Demand Action
- Pro-Israel America
- Stonewall Democratic Club of New York City

Labor unions

- Civil Service Employees Association
- International Association of Firefighters
- International Union of Operating Engineers
- Laborers' International Union of North America
- LiUNA! New York
- NYC District Council of Carpenters
- Transit Workers Union Local 100

Newspapers and publications

- amNewYork Metro
- New York Daily News
- New York Post

==== Polling ====
Poll source	Date(s) administered	Sample size	Margin of error	Jamaal Bowman	George Latimer	Undecided
Emerson College (Note: Poll sponsored by The Hill and WPIX)	June 6–8, 2024	425 (LV)	± 4.7%	31%	48%	21%
Mellman Group (Note: This poll was sponsored by Democratic Majority for Israel PAC, which supports Latimer)	March 26–30, 2024	400 (LV)	± 4.9%	35%	52%	13%
Upswing Research (Note: This poll was sponsored by Bowman's campaign)	March 5–10, 2024	608 (V)	± 4.0%	44%	43%	12%

==== Fundraising ====
Campaign finance reports as of June 5, 2024
Candidate	Raised	Spent	Cash on hand
Jamaal Bowman (D)	$4,305,810	$3,283,470	$1,043,856
George Latimer (D)	$5,771,491	$3,229,300	$2,542,190
Source: Federal Election Commission

==== Debates & forum ====
2024 New York's 16th congressional district debates & candidate forum
No.	Date	Host	Moderator	Link	Democratic	Democratic
Key: P Participant A Absent N Not invited I Invited W Withdrawn						
Key: P Participant A Absent N Not invited I Invited W Withdrawn					Jamaal Bowman	George Latimer
1	May 13, 2024	News 12	Tara Rosenblum		P	P
2	Jun. 10, 2024	League of Women Voters of Westchester County	Dare Thompson		P	P
2	Jun. 13, 2024	Spectrum News	Susan Arbetter; Errol Louis		P	P
3	Jun. 18, 2024	PIX11	Dan Mannarino; Dan Rosoff		P	P

==== Results ====

Latimer

50–60%
60–70%
70–80%
80–90%
90–100%

Bowman

50–60%
60–70%
70–80%
80–90%
90–100%

Other

50% tie
No votes

Democratic primary results
Party	Candidate	Votes	%
Democratic	George Latimer	45,909	58.6
Democratic	Jamaal Bowman (incumbent)	32,440	41.4
Total votes		78,349	100.0

===== By municipality =====
Latimer performed well in northern parts of the district that are suburban. Bowman received more support in the southern and urban areas of the district, such as the district's portion of The Bronx and the cities of Yonkers and Mount Vernon.

Town	George Latimer Democratic		Jamaal Bowman Democratic		Total votes cast
Town	#	%	#	%	Total votes cast
Eastchester	2,116	70.14%	901	29.86%	3,017
Greenburgh	8,859	63.57%	5,077	36.43%	13,936
Harrison	1,482	79.81%	375	20.19%	1,857
Mamaroneck	4,219	81.13%	981	18.87%	5,200
Pelham	1,039	63.74%	591	36.26%	1,630
Town of Rye	2,831	78.11%	793	21.89%	3,624
City of Rye	1,596	86.14%	257	13.86%	1,853
Scarsdale	3,480	90.27%	375	9.73%	3,855
Mount Vernon	2,257	34.12%	4,357	65.88%	6,614
New Rochelle	6,063	63.76%	3,446	36.24%	9,509
White Plains	4,947	70.47%	2,073	29.53%	7,020
Yonkers	5,665	47.06%	6,375	52.94%	12,040
Bronx	1,355	16.53%	6,839	83.47%	8,194
Totals	45,909	58.59%	32,440	41.41%	78,349

=== Republican primary ===
==== Nominee ====
- Miriam Flisser

==== Withdrawn ====
- Madeline Brame, nonprofit founder

==== Fundraising ====
Campaign finance reports as of June 5, 2024
Candidate	Raised	Spent	Cash on hand
Madeline Brame (R)	$12,112	$12,112	$0
Miriam Flisser (R)	$0	$1,312	$8,976
Source: Federal Election Commission

=== General election ===
==== Prediction ====
Source	Ranking	As of
The Cook Political Report	Solid D	December 1, 2023
Inside Elections	Solid D	December 1, 2023
Sabato's Crystal Ball	Safe D	February 23, 2023
Elections Daily	Safe D	September 7, 2023
CNalysis	Solid D	November 16, 2023

==== Results ====
2024 New York's 16th congressional district election
Party	Candidate	Votes	%
Democratic	George Latimer	217,668	71.6
Republican	Miriam Flisser	86,408	28.4
Total votes		304,076	100.0
Democratic hold			

== District 17 ==
2024 New York's 17th congressional district election
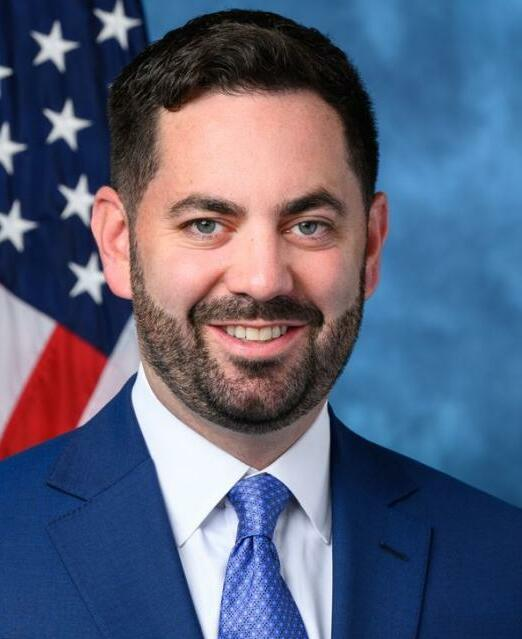

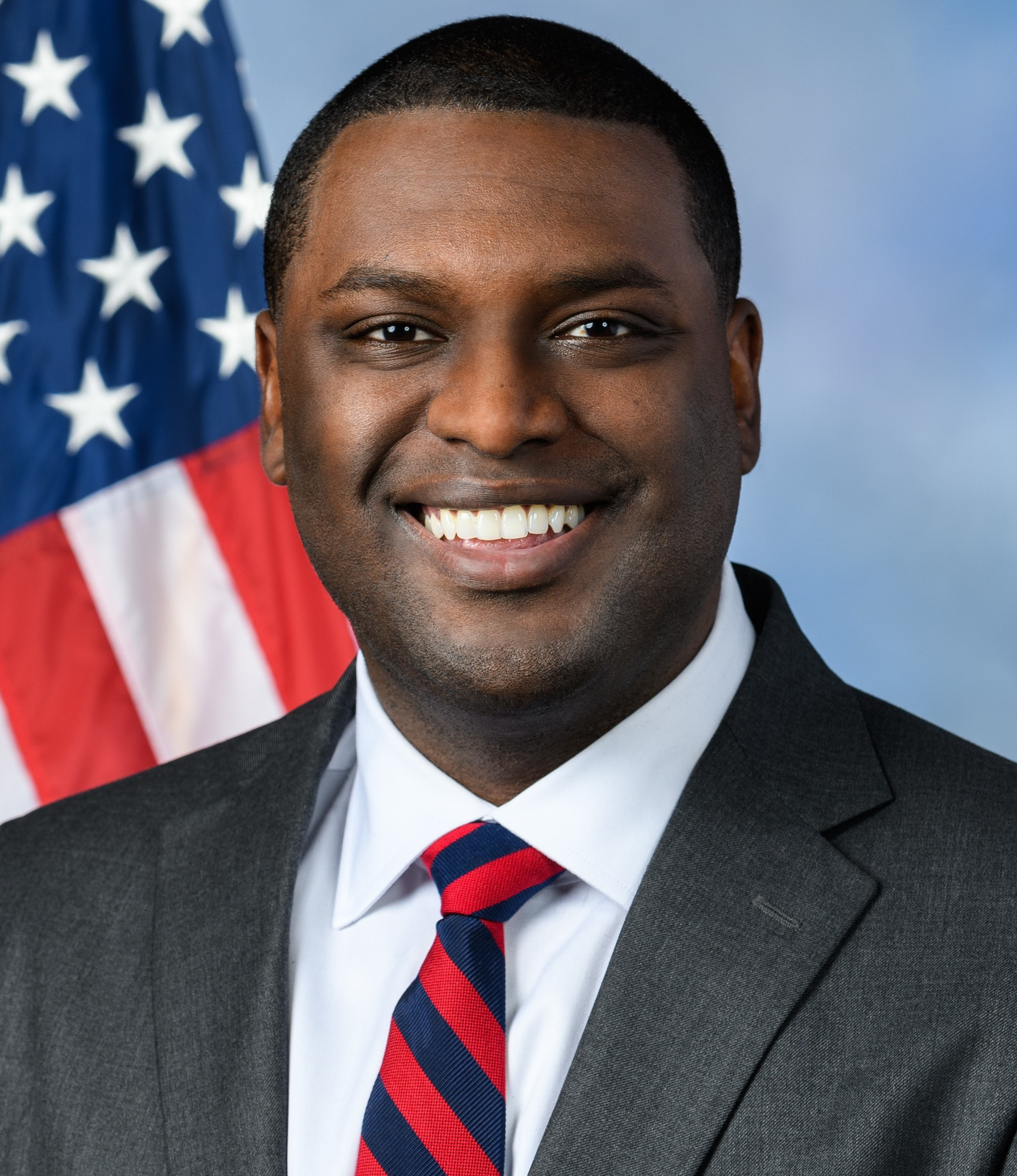
Nominee	Mike Lawler	Mondaire Jones
Party	Republican	Democratic
Alliance	Conservative
Popular vote	197,845	173,899
Percentage	52.2%	45.9%
- Lawler: 40–50% 50–60% 60–70% 70–80% 80–90% >90% Jones: 40–50% 50–60% 60–70% 70–80% 80–90% >90% Tie: 40–50%
U.S. Representative before election
Mike Lawler
Republican
Elected U.S. Representative
Mike Lawler
Republican

The 17th district is based in the Lower Hudson Valley, including all of Rockland and Putnam counties, northern Westchester County, and a small part of Dutchess County. The incumbent was Republican Mike Lawler, who flipped the district and was elected with 50.32% of the vote in 2022. Lawler was opposed by Democrat Mondaire Jones, who had previously represented the 17th district.

=== Republican primary ===
==== Nominee ====
- Mike Lawler, incumbent U.S. representative

==== Declined ====
- William Maloney, former White House liaison to the U.S. Agency for International Development

==== Endorsements ====
Mike Lawler

U.S. executive branch officials

- John Bolton, U.S. National Security advisor (2018–2019), U.S. ambassador to the United Nations (2005–2006)

U.S. senators

- Norm Coleman, former U.S. senator from Minnesota (2003–2009)

U.S. representatives

- Lee Zeldin, former U.S. representative for NY-1 (2015–2023), 2022 Republican nominee for governor of New York

Organizations

- AIPAC
- Huck PAC
- International Franchise Association
- Log Cabin Republicans PAC
- Pro-Israel America
- Republican Jewish Coalition

Labor unions

- Association of Flight Attendants
- LiUNA! New York
William Maloney (declined)

U.S. cabinet officials

- Steve Bannon, former White House chief strategist (2017)

==== Fundraising ====
Campaign finance reports as of June 5, 2024
Candidate	Raised	Spent	Cash on hand
Mike Lawler (R)	$4,936,921	$1,658,296	$3,317,085
Source: Federal Election Commission

=== Democratic primary ===
==== Nominee ====
- Mondaire Jones, member of the U.S. Commission on Civil Rights and former U.S. representative (2021–2023)

==== Disqualified ====
- MaryAnn Carr, former town supervisor of Bedford

==== Withdrawn ====
- Liz Whitmer Gereghty, Katonah–Lewisboro School District trustee and sister of Michigan Governor Gretchen Whitmer (endorsed Jones)

==== Endorsements ====
Mondaire Jones

U.S. representatives

- Nancy Pelosi, U.S. representative from CA-11 (1987–present) and former speaker of the House (2007–2011, 2019–2023)
- Pat Ryan, U.S. representative from New York's 18th congressional district (2022–present)

State legislators

- Peter Harckham, state senator from the 40th district (2019–present)
- Dana Levenberg, state assemblymember from the 95th district (2023–present)
- Shelley Mayer, state senator from the 37th district (2018–present)
- MaryJane Shimsky, state assemblymember from the 92nd district (2023–present)
- Kenneth Zebrowski Jr., state assemblymember from the 96th district (2007–present)

Organizations

- The Collective PAC
- Congressional Black Caucus PAC
- ~~Congressional Progressive Caucus PAC~~ (rescinded endorsement after Jones's endorsement of George Latimer)
- Council for a Livable World
- DCCC Red to Blue
- End Citizens United
- Equality PAC
- Giffords
- Human Rights Campaign
- J Street PAC
- Jewish Democratic Council of America
- LGBTQ Victory Fund
- NewDem Action Fund
- Patriotic Millionaires
- Planned Parenthood Action Fund
- Reproductive Freedom for All

Political parties

- ~~Working Families Party~~ (rescinded endorsement after Jones's endorsement of George Latimer)

Labor unions

- 1199SEIU United Healthcare Workers East
- Communications Workers of America
- New York State Nurses Association
- Retail, Wholesale and Department Store Union
Liz Gereghty (withdrawn)

U.S. representatives

- Lois Frankel, U.S. representative from Florida (2013–present)

Organizations

- EMILY's List

=== Polling ===
Poll source	Date(s) administered	Sample size	Margin of error	Mondaire Jones	Liz Gereghty	Undecided
Public Policy Polling (D) (Note: Poll commissioned by Mondaire Jones)	July 14–15, 2023	570 (LV)	± 4.1%	43%	8%	49%

==== Fundraising ====
Campaign finance reports as of June 5, 2024
Candidate	Raised	Spent	Cash on hand
Mondaire Jones (D)	$4,699,588	$1,163,799	$3,607,134
Source: Federal Election Commission

=== Working Families primary ===
In a surprising twist, political enthusiast Anthony Frascone successfully rallied Rockland County voters to vote for him in the Working Families primary and defeated Democratic nominee Mondaire Jones. Aside from Frascone's effort, the turnout for the primary in Westchester, Putnam and Dutchess was almost entirely non-existent. Following Frascone's primary win, Working Families Party leaders called him a fake candidate and accused him of having stolen the party's ballot line to help Republican Mike Lawler win the general election.

==== Nominee ====
- Anthony Frascone

==== Eliminated in primary ====
- Mondaire Jones, member of the U.S. Commission on Civil Rights and former U.S. representative (2021–2023)

==== Endorsements ====
Mondaire Jones

Political parties

- Working Families Party (Working Families primary only)

==== Results ====
Working Families primary results
Party	Candidate	Votes	%
Working Families	Anthony Frascone	287	59.3
Working Families	Mondaire Jones	197	40.7
Total votes		484	100.0

=== General election ===
==== Predictions ====
Source	Ranking	As of
The Cook Political Report	Lean R	October 25, 2024
Inside Elections	Tilt R	August 29, 2024
Sabato's Crystal Ball	Lean R	September 19, 2024
Elections Daily	Lean R	November 4, 2024
CNalysis	Tilt R	November 4, 2024
Decision Desk HQ	Tossup	October 9, 2024
538	Lean R	October 9, 2024
Fox News	Lean R	October 22, 2024

==== Debates ====
2024 New York's 17th congressional district election debates
No.	Date	Host	Moderator	Link	Republican	Democratic
Key: P Participant A Absent N Not invited I Invited W Withdrawn						
Key: P Participant A Absent N Not invited I Invited W Withdrawn					Lawler	Jones
1	October 16, 2024	News 12	Tara Rosenblum		P	P
2	October 23, 2024	WCBS-TV	Maurice DuBois; Marcia Kramer		P	P
3	November 1, 2024	WPIX	Dan Mannarino	YouTube	P	P

==== Polling ====
Poll source	Date(s) administered	Sample size	Margin of error	Mike Lawler (R)	Mondaire Jones (D)	Undecided
Emerson College	October 24–26, 2024	475 (LV)	± 4.4%	49%	44%	8% (Note: Frascone (WFP) with 1%)
Emerson College	October 1–3, 2024	630 (LV)	± 3.8%	45%	44%	11% (Note: Frascone (WFP) with 3%)
GBAO (D) (Note: Poll sponsored by Jones's campaign)	September 15–18, 2024	500(LV)	± 4.4%	47%	45%	7%
GBAO (D)	September 15–18, 2024	500(LV)	± 4.4%	46%	43%	12% (Note: Frascone (WFP) with 5%)
Change Research (D) (Note: Poll sponsored by the Future Majority PAC, which supports Jones's campaign)	August 10–17, 2024	433 (LV)	± 2.2%	43%	38%	13% (Note: Frascone (WFP) with 6%)
GBAO (D)	August 8–12, 2024	500 (LV)	± 4.4%	47%	40%	14% (Note: Frascone (WFP) with 6%)
EMC Research (D) (Note: This poll was sponsored by End Citizens United and Let America Vote, which support Jones's campaign.)	May 4–7, 2023	300 (LV)	± 5.7%	50%	48%	3%

Hypothetical polling

Generic Republican vs. generic Democrat

Poll source	Date(s) administered	Sample size	Margin of error	Generic Republican	Generic Democrat	Undecided
EMC Research (D)	May 4–7, 2023	300 (LV)	± 5.7%	48%	49%	3%

==== Results ====
2024 New York's 17th congressional district election
Party	Candidate	Votes	%
Republican	Mike Lawler	180,924	47.7
Conservative	Mike Lawler	16,921	4.5
Total	Mike Lawler (incumbent)	197,845	52.2
Democratic	Mondaire Jones	173,899	45.9
Working Families	Anthony Frascone	7,530	2.0
Total votes		379,274	100.0
Republican hold			

== District 18 ==
2024 New York's 18th congressional district election
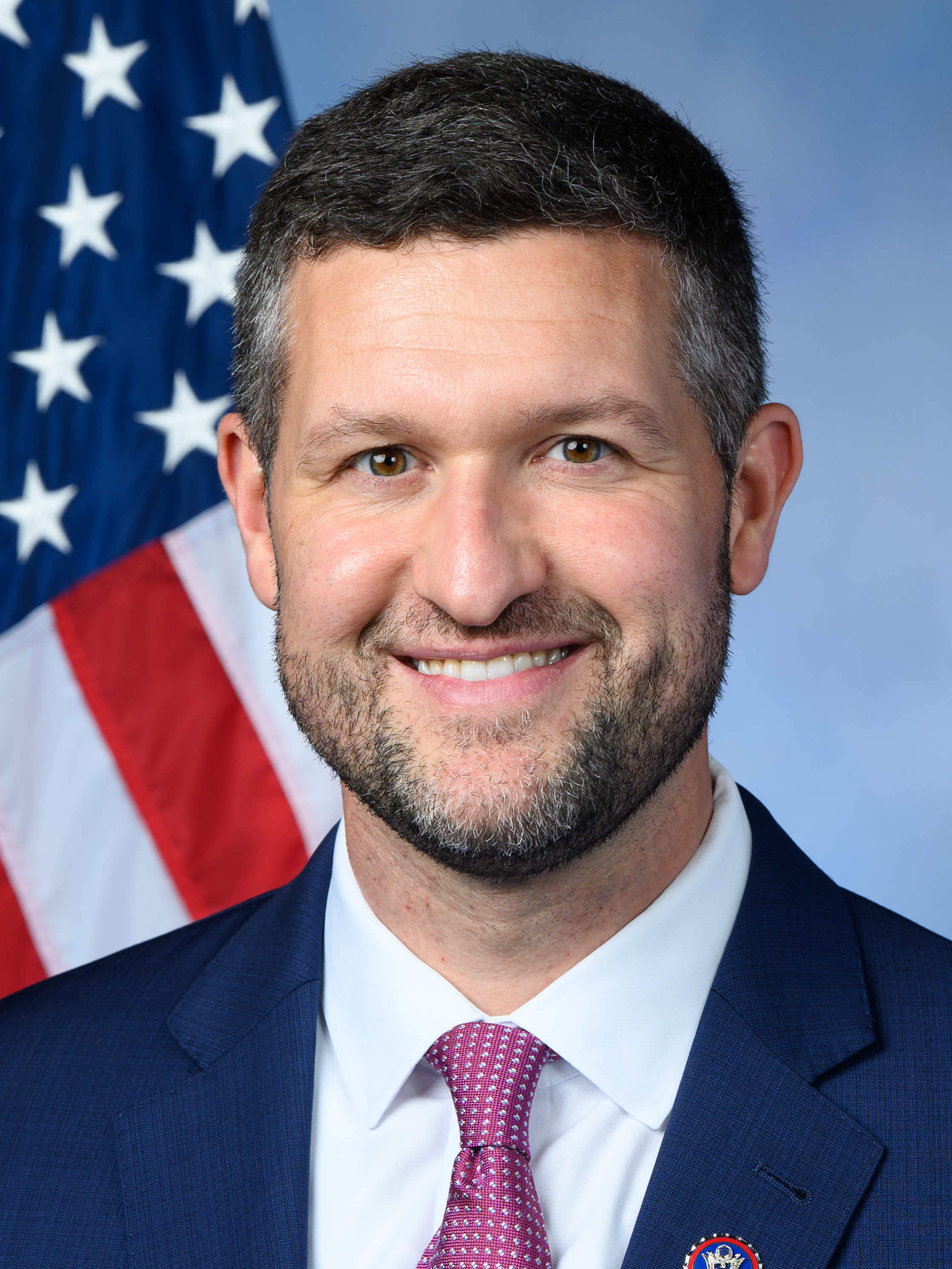

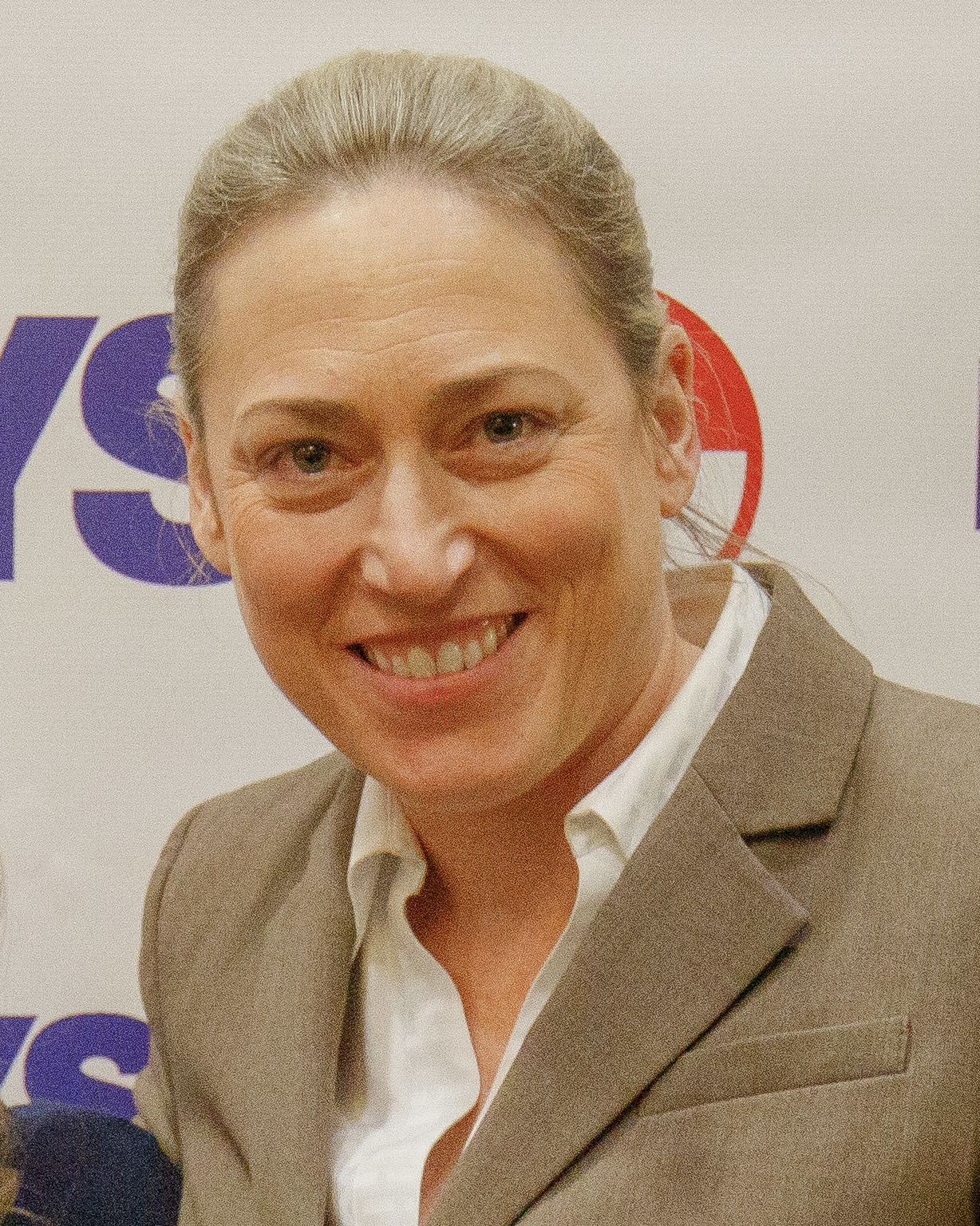
Nominee	Pat Ryan	Alison Esposito
Party	Democratic	Republican
Alliance	Working Families	Conservative
Popular vote	207,106	155,129
Percentage	57.2%	42.8%
- Ryan: 50–60% 60–70% 70–80% 80–90% >90% Esposito: 50–60% 60–70% 70–80% Tie: 50%
U.S. Representative before election
Pat Ryan
Democratic
Elected U.S. Representative
Pat Ryan
Democratic

The 18th district is based in the mid-Hudson Valley, including all of Orange County and most of Dutchess and Ulster counties. The incumbent was Democrat Pat Ryan, who was re-elected with 50.67% of the vote in 2022.

=== Democratic primary ===
==== Nominee ====
- Pat Ryan, incumbent U.S. representative

==== Declined ====
- James Skoufis, state senator from the 42nd district (2019–present) (ran for re-election)

==== Endorsements ====
Pat Ryan

U.S representatives

- Seth Moulton, U.S. representative from Massachusetts's 6th congressional district (2015–present)

Organizations

- AIPAC
- Brady PAC
- Democratic Majority for Israel
- End Citizens United
- Everytown for Gun Safety Action Fund
- Jewish Democratic Council of America
- Jim Owles Liberal Democratic Club
- Joint Action Committee for Political Affairs
- League of Conservation Voters
- NARAL Pro-Choice America
- Natural Resources Defense Council
- Planned Parenthood Action Fund
- Population Connection Action Fund
- Swing Left
- With Honor Fund

Political parties

- Working Families Party

Labor unions

- International Federation of Professional and Technical Engineers
- LiUNA! New York
- New York State Nurses Association

==== Fundraising ====
Campaign finance reports as of June 5, 2024
Candidate	Raised	Spent	Cash on hand
Pat Ryan (D)	$4,709,395 (Note: $50,000 of this total was self-funded by Ryan)	$1,637,447	$3,107,658
Source: Federal Election Commission

=== Republican primary ===
==== Nominee ====
- Alison Esposito, former NYPD deputy inspector and nominee for lieutenant governor in 2022

==== Endorsements ====
Alison Esposito

Executive branch officials

- Donald Trump, 45th and 47th president of the United States

Statewide officials

- George Pataki, former governor of New York

U.S. representatives

- Mike Johnson, speaker of the United States House of Representatives (2023–present) and U.S. representative from Louisiana's 4th congressional district
- Elise Stefanik, U.S. representative from New York's 21st congressional district (2015–present)
- Lee Zeldin, former U.S. representative from New York's 1st congressional district (2015–2023) and nominee for governor of New York in 2022

Organizations

- Congressional Leadership Fund
- Log Cabin Republicans PAC

==== Fundraising ====
Campaign finance reports as of June 5, 2024
Candidate	Raised	Spent	Cash on hand
Alison Esposito (R)	$851,581 (Note: $10,000 of this total was self-funded by Esposito)	$506,291	$345,289
Source: Federal Election Commission

=== General election ===
==== Predictions ====
Source	Ranking	As of
The Cook Political Report	Lean D	December 1, 2023
Inside Elections	Likely D	September 26, 2024
Sabato's Crystal Ball	Likely D	November 4, 2024
Elections Daily	Likely D	February 29, 2024
CNalysis	Likely D	November 16, 2023

=== Polling ===
Poll source	Date(s) administered	Sample size	Margin of error	Pat Ryan (D)	Alison Esposito (R)	Undecided
Emerson College	October 24–26, 2024	450 (LV)	± 4.6%	51%	42%	7%
Emerson College	October 1–3, 2024	630 (LV)	± 3.8%	48%	43%	10%

Hypothetical polling

Pat Ryan vs. generic opponent

Poll source	Date(s) administered	Sample size	Margin of error	Pat Ryan (D)	"Someone new"	Undecided
Cygnal (R) (Note: Poll commissioned by the Congressional Leadership Fund, which supports Republican candidates)	August 1–3, 2023	400 (LV)	± 4.89%	36%	42%	22%

Generic Democrat vs. generic Republican

Poll source	Date(s) administered	Sample size	Margin of error	Generic Democrat	Generic Republican	Undecided
Cygnal (R)	August 1–3, 2023	400 (LV)	± 4.89%	43%	43%	14%

==== Results ====
2024 New York's 18th congressional district election
Party	Candidate	Votes	%
Democratic	Pat Ryan	189,345	52.3
Working Families	Pat Ryan	17,761	4.9
Total	Pat Ryan (incumbent)	207,106	57.2
Republican	Alison Esposito	138,409	38.2
Conservative	Alison Esposito	16,720	4.6
Total	Alison Esposito	155,129	42.8
Total votes		362,235	100.0
Democratic hold			

== District 19 ==
2024 New York's 19th congressional district election
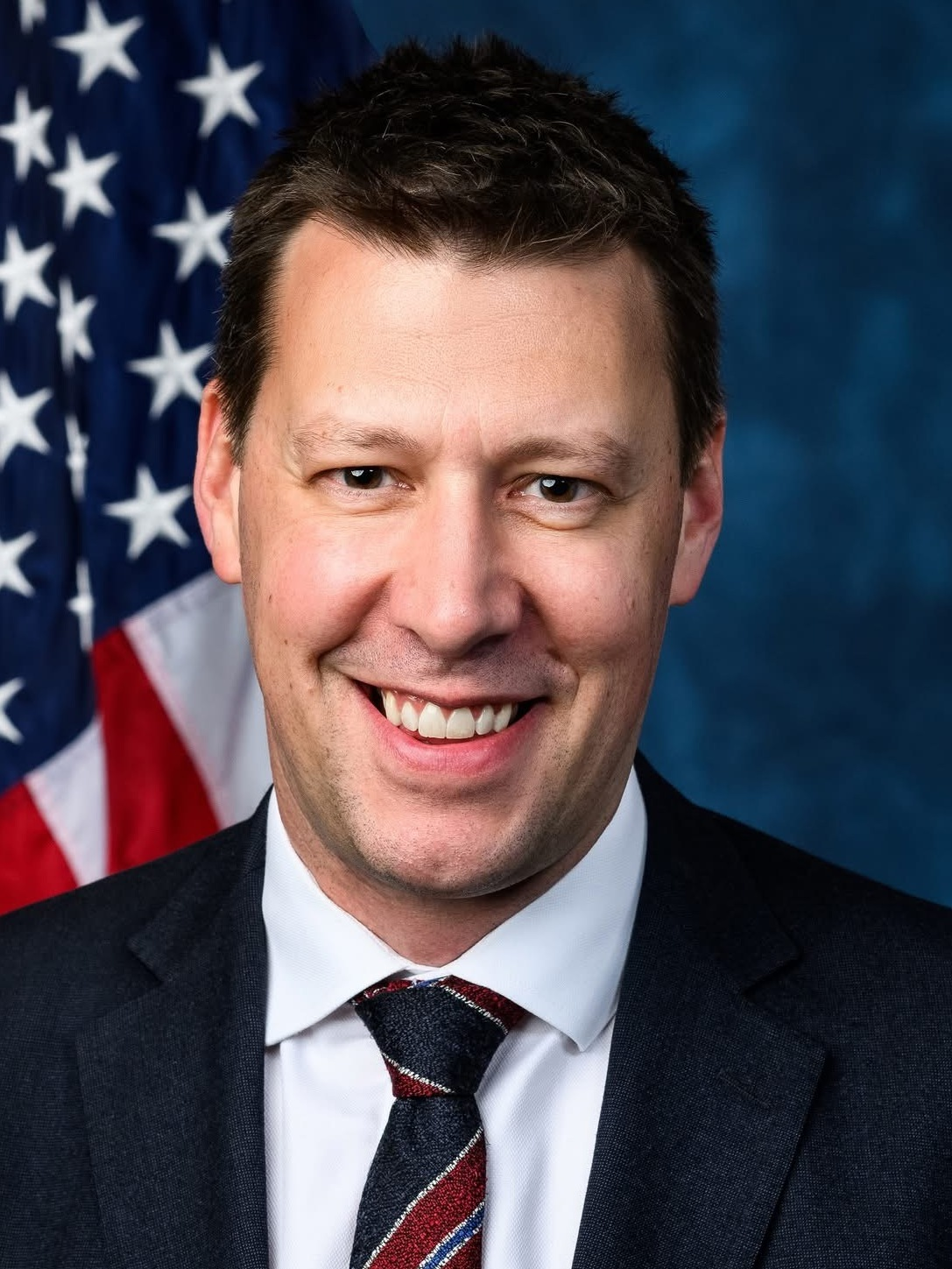

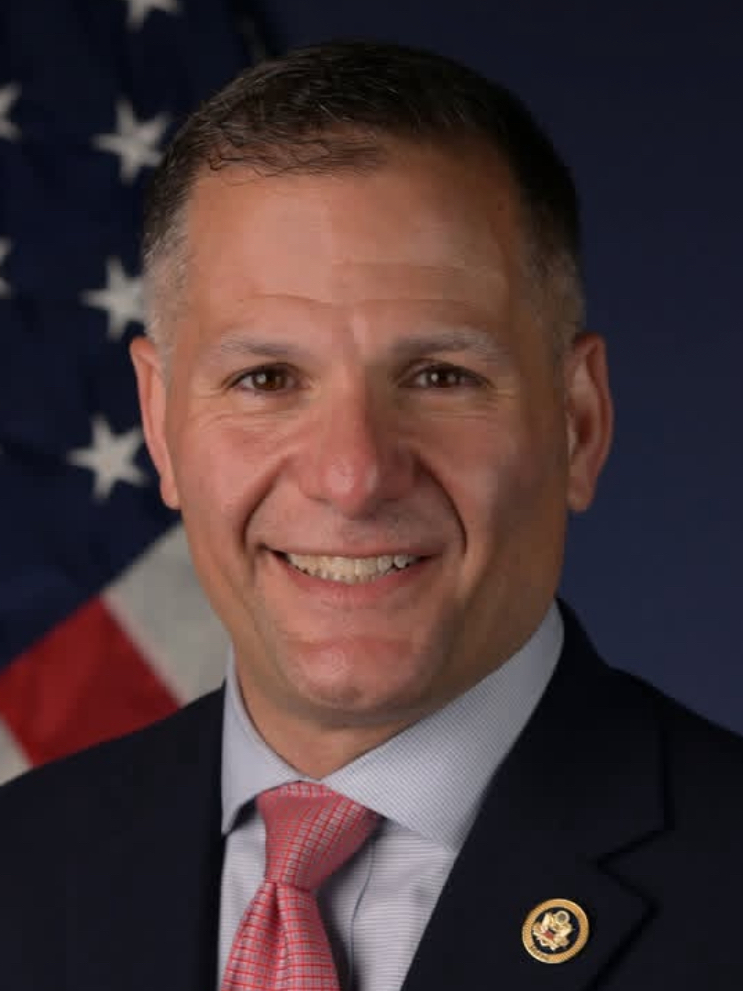
Nominee	Josh Riley	Marc Molinaro
Party	Democratic	Republican
Alliance	Working Families	Conservative
Popular vote	192,647	184,290
Percentage	51.1%	48.9%
- Riley: 50–60% 60–70% 70–80% 80–90% >90% Molinaro: 50–60% 60–70% 70–80% 80–90% >90% No votes
U.S. Representative before election
Marc Molinaro
Republican
Elected U.S. Representative
Josh Riley
Democratic

The 19th district stretches from the Upper Hudson Valley across the Catskill Mountains to parts of the Southern Tier and Finger Lakes, including Hudson, Monticello, Oneonta, Binghamton, and Ithaca. It includes all of Columbia, Greene, Sullivan, Delaware, Otsego, Chenango, Broome, and Tompkins counties, and parts of Rensselaer, Cortland, and Ulster counties. The incumbent was Republican Marc Molinaro, who flipped the district and was elected with 50.78% of the vote in 2022.

=== Republican primary ===
==== Nominee ====
- Marc Molinaro, incumbent U.S. representative

==== Endorsements ====
Marc Molinaro

U.S. senators

- Norm Coleman, former U.S. senator from Minnesota (2003–2009)

U.S. representatives

- Lee Zeldin, former U.S. representative from New York's 1st congressional district (2015–2023) and nominee for governor of New York in 2022

Organizations

- AIPAC
- International Franchise Association
- Pro-Israel America
- Republican Jewish Coalition

Labor unions

- Association of Flight Attendants
- LiUNA! New York

Individuals

- Zalman Leib Teitelbaum, Satmar Rebbe

==== Fundraising ====
Campaign finance reports as of June 5, 2024
Candidate	Raised	Spent	Cash on hand
Marc Molinaro (R)	$3,061,619	$1,377,185	$1,746,448
Source: Federal Election Commission

=== Democratic primary ===
==== Nominee ====
- Josh Riley, lawyer, former aide to then-U.S. Representative Maurice Hinchey, and nominee for this district in 2022

==== Endorsements ====
Josh Riley

U.S. senators

- Al Franken, former U.S. senator from Minnesota (2009–2018)

U.S. representatives

- Gregory Meeks, U.S. representative from New York's 5th congressional district (1998–present)
- Grace Meng, U.S. representative from New York's 6th congressional district (2013–present)
- Joseph Morelle, U.S. representative from New York's 25th congressional district (2018–present)
- Pat Ryan, U.S. representative from New York's 18th congressional district (2022–present)
- Paul Tonko, U.S. representative from New York's 20th congressional district (2009–present)

Organizations

- DCCC Red to Blue
- Democrats Serve
- End Citizens United
- Everytown for Gun Safety (post-primary)
- Jewish Democratic Council of America
- Natural Resources Defense Council
- NewDem Action Fund
- Patriotic Millionaires
- Planned Parenthood Action Fund
- Population Connection Action Fund
- Reproductive Freedom for All

Political parties

- Working Families Party

Labor unions

- New York State Nurses Association

==== Fundraising ====
Campaign finance reports as of June 5, 2024
Candidate	Raised	Spent	Cash on hand
Josh Riley (D)	$4,565,463	$1,159,621	$3,422,868
Source: Federal Election Commission

=== General election ===
==== Predictions ====
Source	Ranking	As of
The Cook Political Report	Tossup	December 1, 2023
Inside Elections	Tilt D (flip)	October 31, 2024
Sabato's Crystal Ball	Lean D (flip)	November 4, 2024
Elections Daily	Lean D (flip)	November 4, 2024
CNalysis	Tilt D (flip)	November 4, 2024

=== Polling ===
Poll source	Date(s) administered	Sample size	Margin of error	Marcus Molinaro (R)	Josh Riley (D)	Other/Undecided
SurveyUSA (Note: Poll sponsored by WNYT)	October 11–16, 2024	561 (LV)	± 4.9%	42%	46%	12%
Garin-Hart-Yang (D) (Note: Poll sponsored by Riley's campaign)	October 9–13, 2024	801 (LV)	± 3.5%	45%	48%	7%
RMG Research (Note: Poll sponsored by U.S. Term Limits)	September 5–12, 2024	461 (LV)	± 4.6%	39%	42%	19%
Cygnal (R) (Note: Poll sponsored by Molinaro's campaign)	July 9–11, 2024	420 (RV)	–	47%	38%	15%

==== Results ====
2024 New York's 19th congressional district election
Party	Candidate	Votes	%
Democratic	Josh Riley	170,049	45.1
Working Families	Josh Riley	22,598	6.0
Total	Josh Riley	192,647	51.1
Republican	Marc Molinaro	164,001	43.5
Conservative	Marc Molinaro	20,289	5.4
Total	Marc Molinaro (incumbent)	184,290	48.9
Total votes		376,937	100.0
Democratic gain from Republican			

== District 20 ==
2024 New York's 20th congressional district election
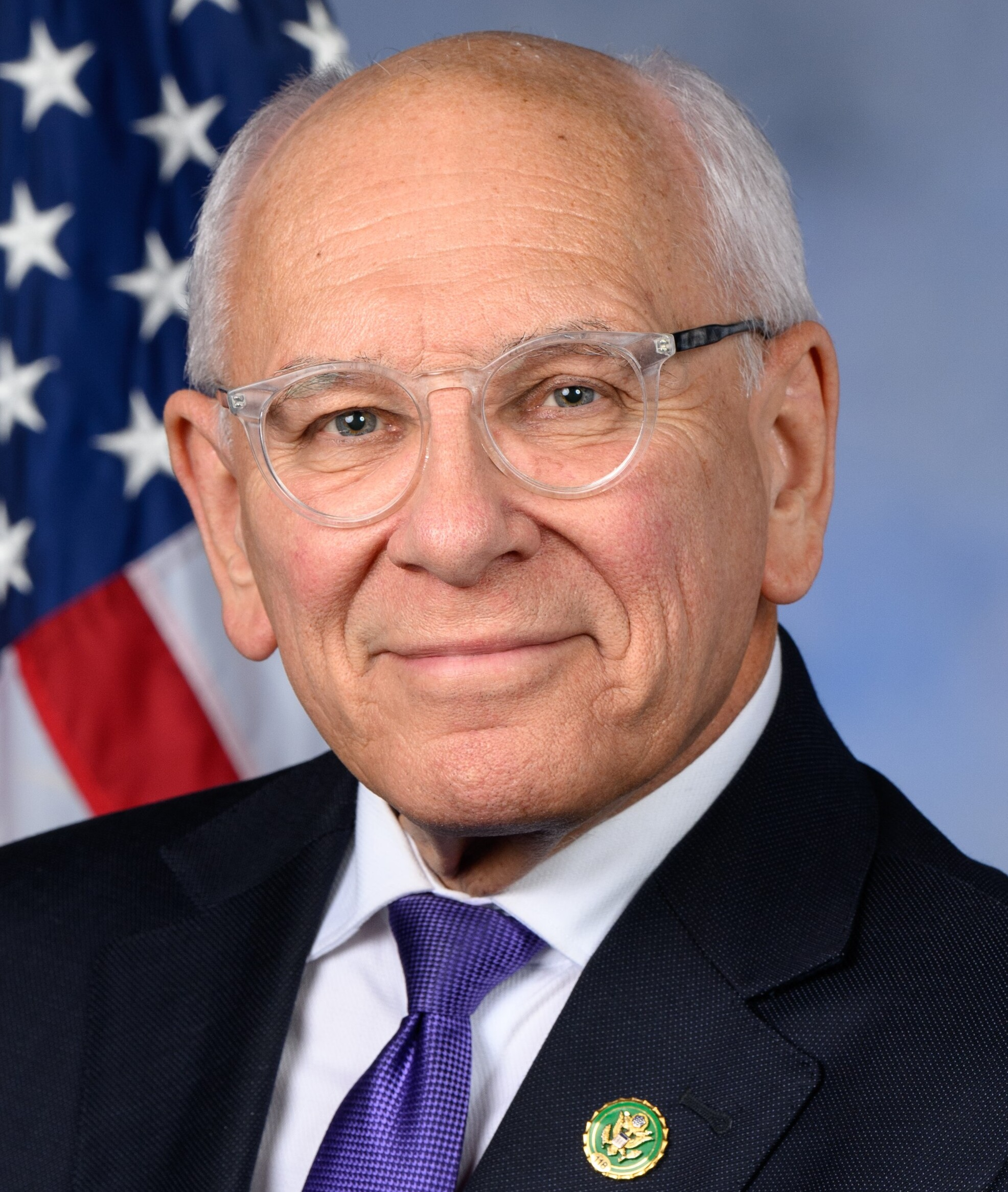

Nominee	Paul Tonko	Kevin Waltz
Party	Democratic	Republican
Alliance	Working Families	Conservative
Popular vote	221,997	141,151
Percentage	61.1%	38.9%
- Tonko: 50–60% 60–70% 70–80% 80–90% >90% Waltz: 50–60% 60–70% Tie: 50% No votes
U.S. Representative before election
Paul Tonko
Democratic
Elected U.S. Representative
Paul Tonko
Democratic

The 20th district is based in the Capital Region, including Albany, Troy, Schenectady, Saratoga Springs, and Amsterdam. It includes all of Albany and Schenectady counties, and parts of Saratoga, Rensselaer, and Montgomery counties. The incumbent was Democrat Paul Tonko, who was re-elected with 55.07% of the vote in 2022.

=== Democratic primary ===
==== Nominee ====
- Paul Tonko, incumbent U.S. representative

==== Endorsements ====
Paul Tonko

Organizations

- J Street PAC
- League of Conservation Voters
- New York League of Conservation Voters
- Sierra Club
- Vote Common Good

Labor unions

- New York State Nurses Association
- United Auto Workers

Political parties

- Working Families Party

==== Fundraising ====
Campaign finance reports as of June 5, 2024
Candidate	Raised	Spent	Cash on hand
Paul Tonko (D)	$1,047,851	$1,200,867	$573,109
Source: Federal Election Commission

=== Republican primary ===
==== Nominee ====
- Kevin Waltz, legislative aide and law school student

==== Declined ====
- Liz Joy, realtor and nominee for this district in 2020 and 2022

=== General election ===
==== Prediction ====
Source	Ranking	As of
The Cook Political Report	Solid D	December 1, 2023
Inside Elections	Solid D	December 1, 2023
Sabato's Crystal Ball	Safe D	February 23, 2023
Elections Daily	Safe D	September 7, 2023
CNalysis	Solid D	November 16, 2023

==== Results ====
2024 New York's 20th congressional district election
Party	Candidate	Votes	%
Democratic	Paul Tonko	200,354	55.2
Working Families	Paul Tonko	21,643	5.9
Total	Paul Tonko (incumbent)	221,997	61.1
Republican	Kevin Waltz	121,609	33.5
Conservative	Kevin Waltz	19,542	5.4
Total	Kevin Waltz	141,151	38.9
Total votes		363,148	100.0
Democratic hold			

== District 21 ==
2024 New York's 21st congressional district election
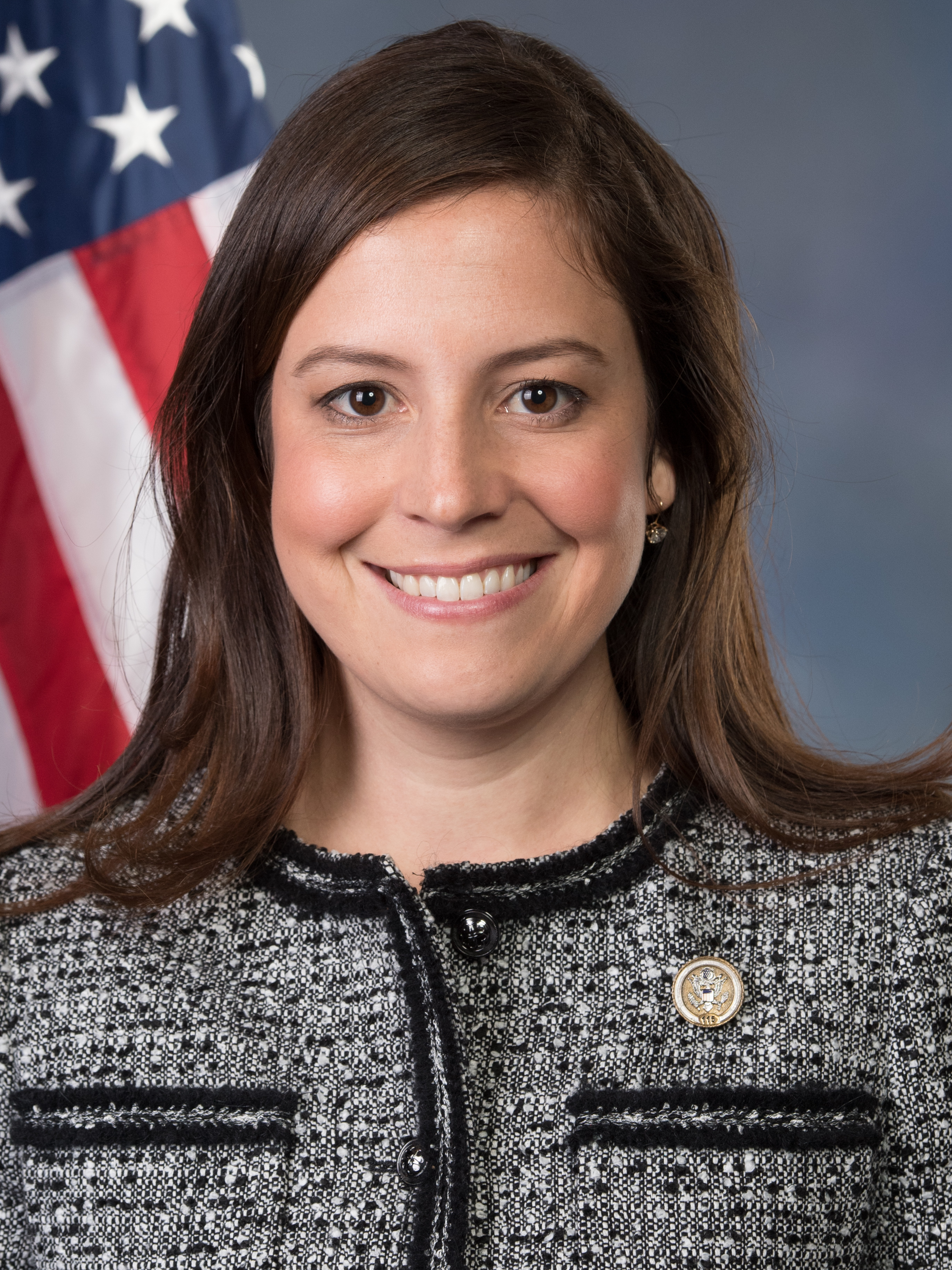

Nominee	Elise Stefanik	Paula Collins
Party	Republican	Democratic
Alliance	Conservative	Working Families
Popular vote	216,513	131,930
Percentage	62.1%	37.9%
- Stefanik: 50–60% 60–70% 70–80% 80–90% >90% Collins: 50–60% 60–70% 70–80% 80–90% Tie: 50% No votes
U.S. Representative before election
Elise Stefanik
Republican
Elected U.S. Representative
Elise Stefanik
Republican

The 21st district is based in the North Country and Adirondack Mountains, including Glens Falls, Lake George, Plattsburgh, Potsdam, Herkimer, and Rome. The incumbent was Republican Elise Stefanik, who was re-elected with 59.1% of the vote in 2022.

=== Republican primary ===
==== Nominee ====
- Elise Stefanik, incumbent U.S. representative

==== Withdrawn ====
- Jill Lochner, training manager

==== Endorsements ====
Elise Stefanik

Organizations

- AIPAC
- Campaign for Working Families
- Huck PAC
- International Franchise Association
- Log Cabin Republicans PAC
- Maggie's List

==== Fundraising ====
Campaign finance reports as of June 5, 2024
Candidate	Raised	Spent	Cash on hand
Elise Stefanik (R)	$9,825,315	$5,086,854	$5,655,250
Source: Federal Election Commission

=== Democratic primary ===
==== Nominee ====
- Paula Collins, cannabis tax attorney

==== Withdrawn ====
- Steven Holden, financial management consultant and nominee for the 24th district in 2022

==== Declined ====
- Scott Phillip Lewis (ran as an Independent)

==== Endorsements ====
Paula Collins

Organizations

- Citizen Action of New York
- National Organization for Women

Political parties

- Working Families Party

=== Working Families primary ===
==== Withdrawn ====
- Brian Rouleau, car dealership finance manager

==== Fundraising ====
Campaign finance reports as of June 5, 2024
Candidate	Raised	Spent	Cash on hand
Paula Collins (D)	$23,126 (Note: $11,130 of this total was self-funded by Collins)	$6,907	$34,724
Source: Federal Election Commission

=== General election ===
==== Predictions ====
Source	Ranking	As of
The Cook Political Report	Solid R	December 1, 2023
Inside Elections	Solid R	December 1, 2023
Sabato's Crystal Ball	Safe R	February 23, 2023
Elections Daily	Safe R	September 7, 2023
CNalysis	Solid R	November 16, 2023

==== Results ====
2024 New York's 21st congressional district election
Party	Candidate	Votes	%
Republican	Elise Stefanik	195,464	56.1
Conservative	Elise Stefanik	21,049	6.0
Total	Elise Stefanik (incumbent)	216,513	62.1
Democratic	Paula Collins	121,289	34.8
Working Families	Paula Collins	10,641	3.1
Total	Paula Collins	131,930	37.9
Total votes		348,443	100.0
Republican hold			

== District 22 ==
2024 New York's 22nd congressional district election
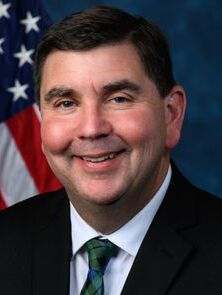

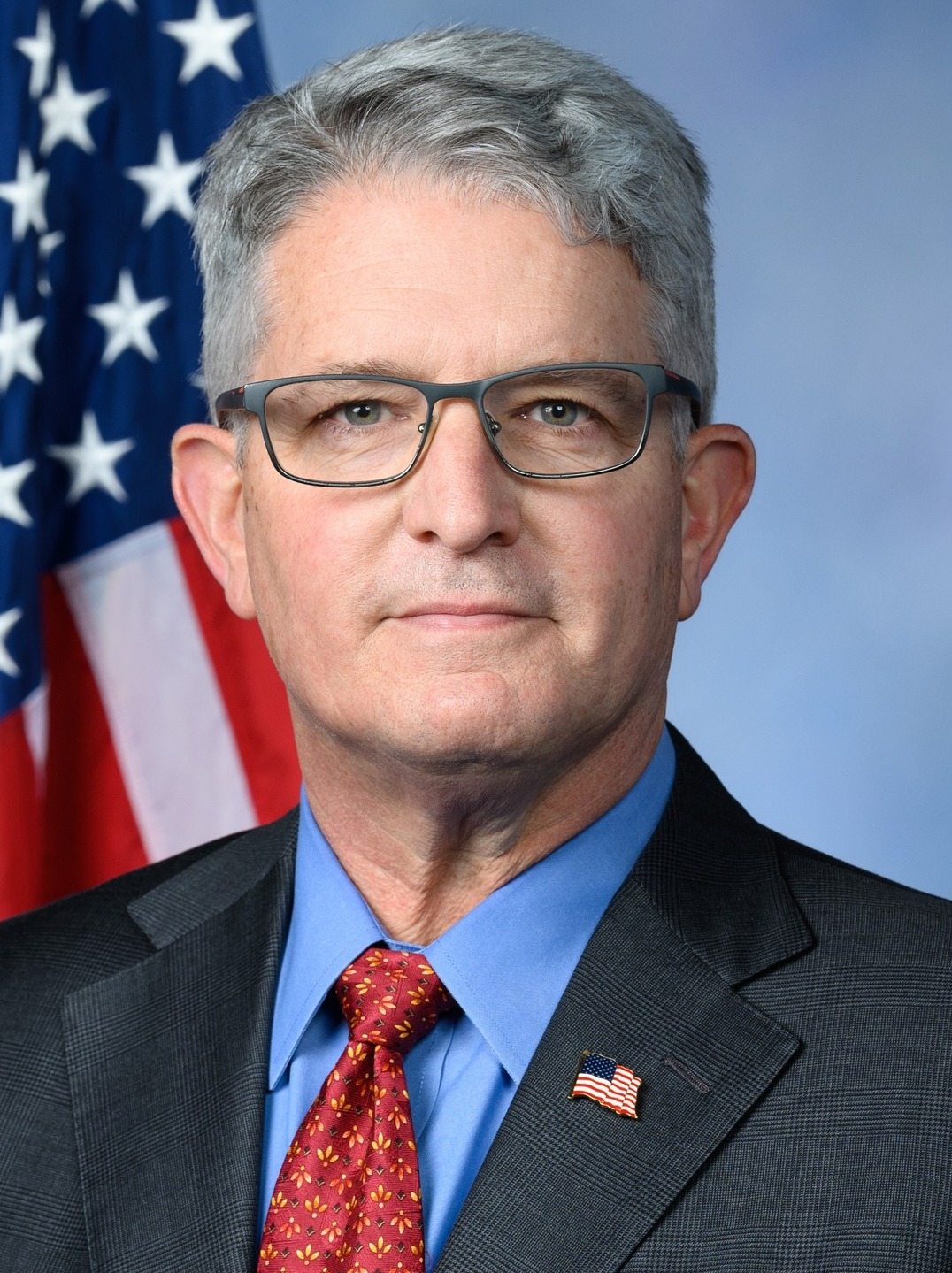
Nominee	John Mannion	Brandon Williams
Party	Democratic	Republican
Alliance	Working Families	Conservative
Popular vote	194,450	161,939
Percentage	54.6%	45.4%
- Mannion: 50–60% 60–70% 70–80% 80–90% >90% Williams: 50–60% 60–70% 70–80% >90% Tie: 50% No votes
U.S. Representative before election
Brandon Williams
Republican
Elected U.S. Representative
John Mannion
Democratic

The 22nd district is based in Central New York and the Mohawk Valley, including Syracuse and Utica. It includes all of Onondaga and Madison counties, and parts of Oneida, Cayuga, and Cortland counties. The incumbent was Republican Brandon Williams, who was elected with 50.49% of the vote in 2022.

Challenger Mannion defeated incumbent Williams by a larger-than-expected 9.2% margin. After Mannion was sworn-in on January 3, 2025, this marked the first time the city of Syracuse was congressionally represented by a Democrat in 10 years.

=== Republican primary ===
==== Nominee ====
- Brandon Williams, incumbent U.S. representative

==== Endorsements ====
Brandon Williams

Executive branch officials

- Donald Trump, 45th and 47th president of the United States

U.S. senators

- Norm Coleman, former U.S. senator from Minnesota (2003–2009)

U.S. representatives

- Lee Zeldin, former U.S. representative from New York's 1st congressional district (2015–2023) and nominee for governor of New York in 2022

Organizations

- AIPAC
- Huck PAC
- International Franchise Association
- Log Cabin Republicans PAC
- Pro-Israel America
- Republican Jewish Coalition

Labor unions

- LiUNA! New York

==== Fundraising ====
Campaign finance reports as of June 5, 2024
Candidate	Raised	Spent	Cash on hand
Brandon Williams (R)	$2,386,295	$1,357,304	$1,053,154
Source: Federal Election Commission

=== Democratic primary ===
==== Nominee ====
- John Mannion, state senator from the 50th district (2020–present)

==== Eliminated in primary ====
- Sarah Klee Hood, DeWitt town board member and candidate for this district in 2022

==== Withdrew ====
- Jake Addington, farmworker (endorsed Klee Hood)
- Clemmie Harris, Utica University professor and former aide to then-governor David Paterson
- Katelyn Kriesel, Manlius town councilor

==== Endorsements ====
Sarah Klee Hood

U.S. senators

- Tammy Duckworth, Illinois (2017–present)

U.S. representatives

- Lois Frankel, FL-22 (2013–present)
- Chrissy Houlahan, PA-06 (2019–present)
- Seth Moulton, MA-06 (2015–present)
- Pat Ryan, NY-18 (2023-present)

Local officials

- Caroline Reale, Oneida County legislator (2022–present)

Individuals

- Jon Soltz, chair of VoteVets.org

Organizations

- Food & Water Action
- Patriotic Millionaires
- Vote Common Good
- Vote Mama
- VoteVets.org

Political parties

- Cortland County Democratic Committee
- Madison County Democratic Committee
John Mannion

U.S. representatives

- Tim Kennedy, NY-26 (2024–present)

State legislators

- Bill Magnarelli, state assemblyman from the 129th district (1999–present)
- Al Stirpe, state assemblyman from the 127th district (2007–2010, 2013–present)
- 25 state senators

Local officials

- Peggy Chase, Onondaga County legislator from the 9th district (2013–present)
- Sarah Klee Hood, DeWitt town board member and candidate for this district in 2022
- Mary Kuhn, Onondaga County legislator from the 7th district (2019–present)

Political parties

- Cayuga County Democratic Committee
- Onondaga County Democratic Committee
- Working Families Party

Organizations

- Democrats Serve
- Everytown for Gun Safety (post-primary)
- New York League of Conservation Voters

Labor unions

- Amalgamated Transit Union – National and Local 580
- American Federation of State, County and Municipal Employees
- American Federation of Teachers
- Civil Service Employees Association Local 1000
- International Association of Machinists and Aerospace Workers New York State Council and District 15
- National Education Association
- New York State AFL-CIO
- New York State Nurses Association
- New York State Public Employees Federation
- New York State United Teachers
- United Food and Commercial Workers Union Local 1

==== Polling ====
Poll source	Date(s) administered	Sample size	Margin of error	John Mannion	Sarah Klee Hood	Clemmie Harris	Undecided
GBAO Strategies (Note: Poll commissioned by Mannion's campaign)	March 25–27, 2024	400 (LV)	± 4.9%	42%	20%	9%	27%

==== Fundraising ====
Campaign finance reports as of June 5, 2024
Candidate	Raised	Spent	Cash on hand
Sarah Klee Hood (D)	$1,396,843	$1,118,169	$279,265
John Mannion (D)	$869,191	$663,042	$206,149
Source: Federal Election Commission

==== Results ====
Democratic primary results
Party	Candidate	Votes	%
Democratic	John Mannion	16,624	61.6
Democratic	Sarah Klee Hood	10,373	38.4
Total votes		26,997	100.0

=== General election ===
==== Predictions ====
Source	Ranking	As of
The Cook Political Report	Lean D (flip)	February 29, 2024
Inside Elections	Lean D (flip)	October 18, 2024
Sabato's Crystal Ball	Lean D (flip)	February 28, 2024
Elections Daily	Lean D (flip)	February 29, 2024
CNalysis	Lean D (flip)	November 4, 2024

=== Polling ===
Poll source	Date(s) administered	Sample size	Margin of error	Brandon Williams (R)	John Mannion (D)	Undecided
McLaughlin & Associates (R) (Note: This poll was sponsored by William's campaign)	October 15–17, 2024	400 (LV)	± 4.9%	46%	46%	8%
GQR (D) (Note: This poll was sponsored by House Majority PAC)	July 9–15, 2024	400 (LV)	–	43%	50%	7%

==== Results ====
2024 New York's 22nd congressional district election
Party	Candidate	Votes	%
Democratic	John Mannion	178,394	50.1
Working Families	John Mannion	16,056	4.5
Total	John Mannion	194,450	54.6
Republican	Brandon Williams	142,082	39.9
Conservative	Brandon Williams	19,857	5.6
Total	Brandon Williams (incumbent)	161,939	45.4
Total votes		356,389	100.0
Democratic gain from Republican			

== District 23 ==
2024 New York's 23rd congressional district election
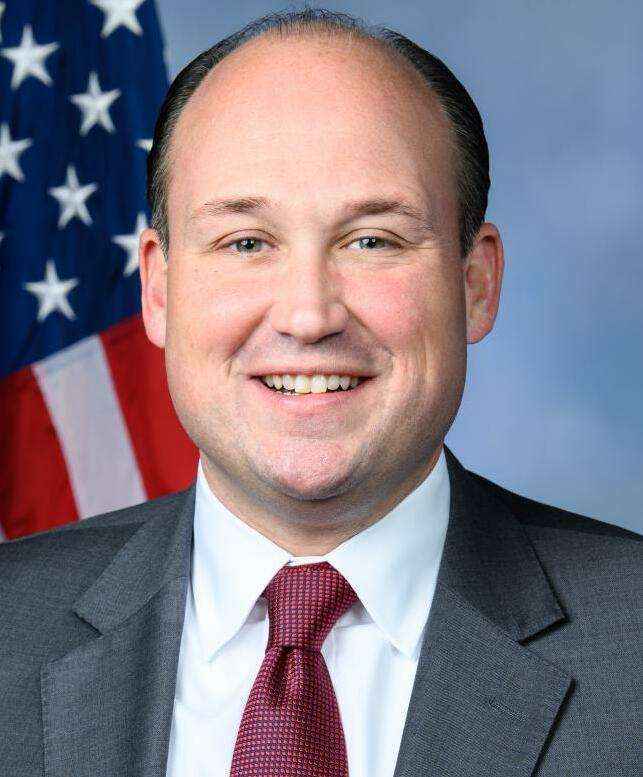

Nominee	Nick Langworthy	Thomas Carle
Party	Republican	Democratic
Alliance	Conservative	Working Families
Popular vote	247,599	128,651
Percentage	65.8%	34.2%
- Langworthy: 50–60% 60–70% 70–80% 80–90% Carle: 50–60% 60–70% 70–80% >90% No votes
U.S. Representative before election
Nick Langworthy
Republican
Elected U.S. Representative
Nick Langworthy
Republican

The incumbent was Republican Nick Langworthy, who was elected with 64.92% of the vote in 2022.

=== Republican primary ===
==== Nominee ====
- Nick Langworthy, incumbent U.S. representative

==== Endorsements ====
Nick Langworthy

Organizations

- AIPAC
- International Franchise Association

==== Fundraising ====
Campaign finance reports as of June 5, 2024
Candidate	Raised	Spent	Cash on hand
Nick Langworthy (R)	$1,196,706	$454,841	$832,334
Source: Federal Election Commission

=== Democratic primary ===
==== Nominee ====
- Thomas Carle, food manufacturing industry executive

==== Endorsements ====
Thomas Carle

Political parties

- Working Families Party

=== General election ===
==== Predictions ====
Source	Ranking	As of
The Cook Political Report	Solid R	December 1, 2023
Inside Elections	Solid R	December 1, 2023
Sabato's Crystal Ball	Safe R	February 23, 2023
Elections Daily	Safe R	September 7, 2023
CNalysis	Solid R	November 16, 2023

==== Results ====
2024 New York's 23rd congressional district election
Party	Candidate	Votes	%
Republican	Nick Langworthy	214,488	57.0
Conservative	Nick Langworthy	33,111	8.8
Total	Nick Langworthy (incumbent)	247,599	65.8
Democratic	Thomas Carle	128,651	34.2
Total votes		376,250	100.0
Republican hold			

== District 24 ==
2024 New York's 24th congressional district election
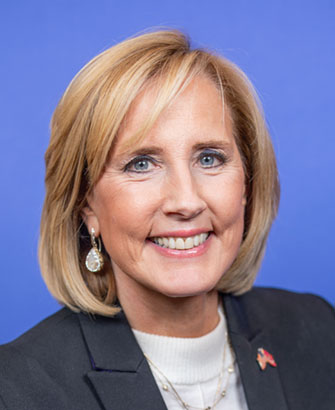

Nominee	Claudia Tenney	David Wagenhauser
Party	Republican	Democratic
Alliance	Conservative
Popular vote	235,867	123,317
Percentage	65.7%	34.3%
- Tenney: 50–60% 60–70% 70–80% 80–90% Wagenhauser: 50–60% 60–70% 70–80% Tie: 50% No votes
U.S. Representative before election
Claudia Tenney
Republican
Elected U.S. Representative
Claudia Tenney
Republican

The incumbent was Republican Claudia Tenney, who was re-elected with 65.7% of the vote in 2022.

=== Republican primary ===
==== Nominee ====
- Claudia Tenney, incumbent U.S. representative

==== Eliminated in primary ====
- Mario Fratto, attorney and candidate for this district in 2022

==== Endorsements ====
Mario Fratto

U.S. representatives

- Paul Gosar, U.S. representative from Arizona (2011–present)
Claudia Tenney

Executive branch officials

- Donald Trump, 45th and 47th president of the United States

County chairs

- 12 Republican county chairs
- 5 Conservative county chairs

Organizations

- AIPAC
- Campaign for Working Families
- Log Cabin Republicans PAC
- National Rifle Association Political Victory Fund
- Republican Jewish Coalition

==== Fundraising ====
Campaign finance reports as of June 5, 2024
Candidate	Raised	Spent	Cash on hand
Mario Fratto (R)	$508,139 (Note: $450,000 of this total was self-funded by Fratto)	$291,379	$219,795
Claudia Tenney (R)	$2,000,688	$1,509,949	$552,188
Source: Federal Election Commission

==== Results ====
Republican primary results
Party	Candidate	Votes	%
Republican	Claudia Tenney (incumbent)	19,485	61.4
Republican	Mario Fratto	12,233	38.6
Total votes		31,718	100.0

=== Democratic primary ===
==== Nominee ====
- David Wagenhauser, attorney

==== Fundraising ====
Campaign finance reports as of June 5, 2024
Candidate	Raised	Spent	Cash on hand
David Wagenhauser (D)	$27,256 (Note: $700 of this total was self-funded by Wagenhauser)	$7,390	$19,866
Source: Federal Election Commission

=== General election ===
==== Predictions ====
Source	Ranking	As of
The Cook Political Report	Solid R	December 1, 2023
Inside Elections	Solid R	December 1, 2023
Sabato's Crystal Ball	Safe R	February 23, 2023
Elections Daily	Safe R	September 7, 2023
CNalysis	Solid R	November 16, 2023

==== Results ====
2024 New York's 24th congressional district election
Party	Candidate	Votes	%
Republican	Claudia Tenney	207,078	57.7
Conservative	Claudia Tenney	28,789	8.0
Total	Claudia Tenney (incumbent)	235,867	65.7
Democratic	David Wagenhauser	123,317	34.3
Total votes		359,184	100.0
Republican hold			

== District 25 ==
2024 New York's 25th congressional district election
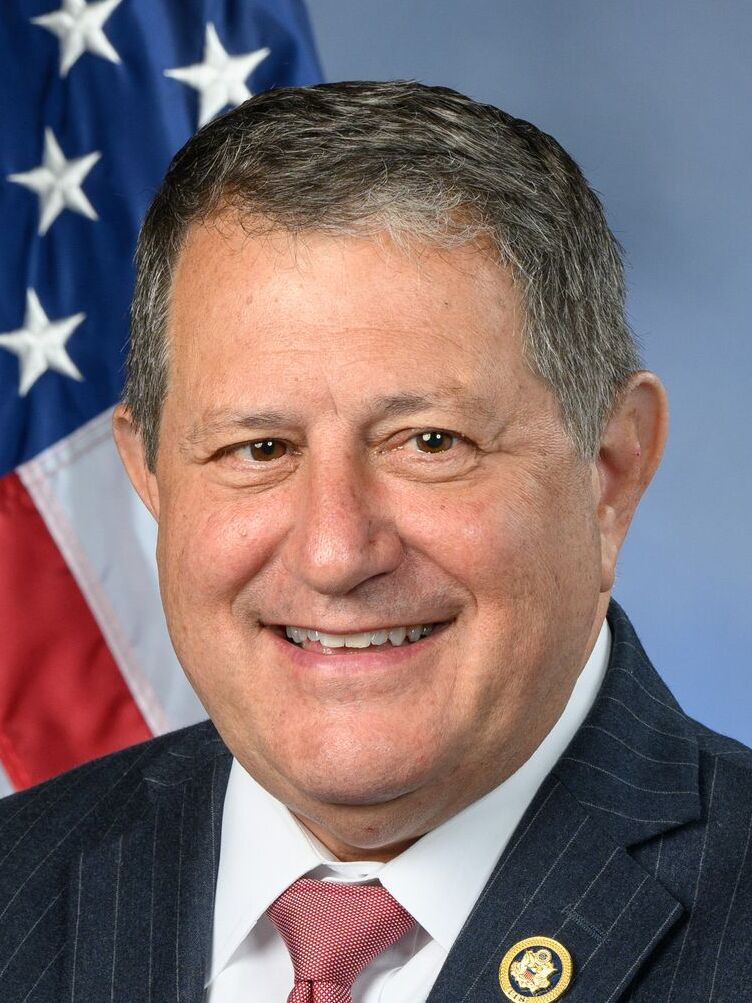

Nominee	Joseph Morelle	Gregg Sadwick
Party	Democratic	Republican
Alliance	Working Families
Popular vote	219,175	141,195
Percentage	60.8%	39.2%
- Morelle: 50–60% 60–70% 70–80% 80–90% >90% Sadwick: 50–60% 60–70% 70–80% Tie: 50% No votes
U.S. Representative before election
Joseph Morelle
Democratic
Elected U.S. Representative
Joseph Morelle
Democratic

The 25th district is based in the Rochester area, including all of Monroe County and part of Ontario County. The incumbent was Democrat Joseph Morelle, who was re-elected with 53.87% of the vote in 2022.

=== Democratic primary ===
==== Nominee ====
- Joseph Morelle, incumbent U.S. representative

==== Endorsements ====
Joseph Morelle

Organizations

- AIPAC
- Democratic Majority for Israel
- New York League of Conservation Voters
- Population Connection Action Fund
- Pro-Israel America

Labor unions

- LiUNA! New York
- New York State Nurses Association

Political parties

- Working Families Party

==== Fundraising ====
Campaign finance reports as of June 5, 2024
Candidate	Raised	Spent	Cash on hand
Joseph Morelle (D)	$1,319,564 (Note: $450,000 of this total was self-funded by Fratto)	$911,519	$460,920
Source: Federal Election Commission

=== Republican primary ===
==== Nominee ====
- Gregg Sadwick, businessman and former president of the Greece Rotary Club

==== Endorsements ====
Gregg Sadwick

Party chapters

- Monroe County Republican Party

==== Fundraising ====
Campaign finance reports as of June 5, 2024
Candidate	Raised	Spent	Cash on hand
Gregg Sadwick (R)	$256,955	$102,166	$154,789
Source: Federal Election Commission

=== General election ===
==== Prediction ====
Source	Ranking	As of
The Cook Political Report	Solid D	December 1, 2023
Inside Elections	Solid D	December 1, 2023
Sabato's Crystal Ball	Safe D	February 23, 2023
Elections Daily	Safe D	September 7, 2023
CNalysis	Solid D	November 16, 2023

==== Results ====
2024 New York's 25th congressional district election
Party	Candidate	Votes	%
Democratic	Joseph Morelle	200,507	55.6
Working Families	Joseph Morelle	18,668	5.2
Total	Joseph Morelle (incumbent)	219,175	60.8
Republican	Gregg Sadwick	141,195	39.2
Total votes		360,370	100.0
Democratic hold			

== District 26 ==
2024 New York's 26th congressional district election
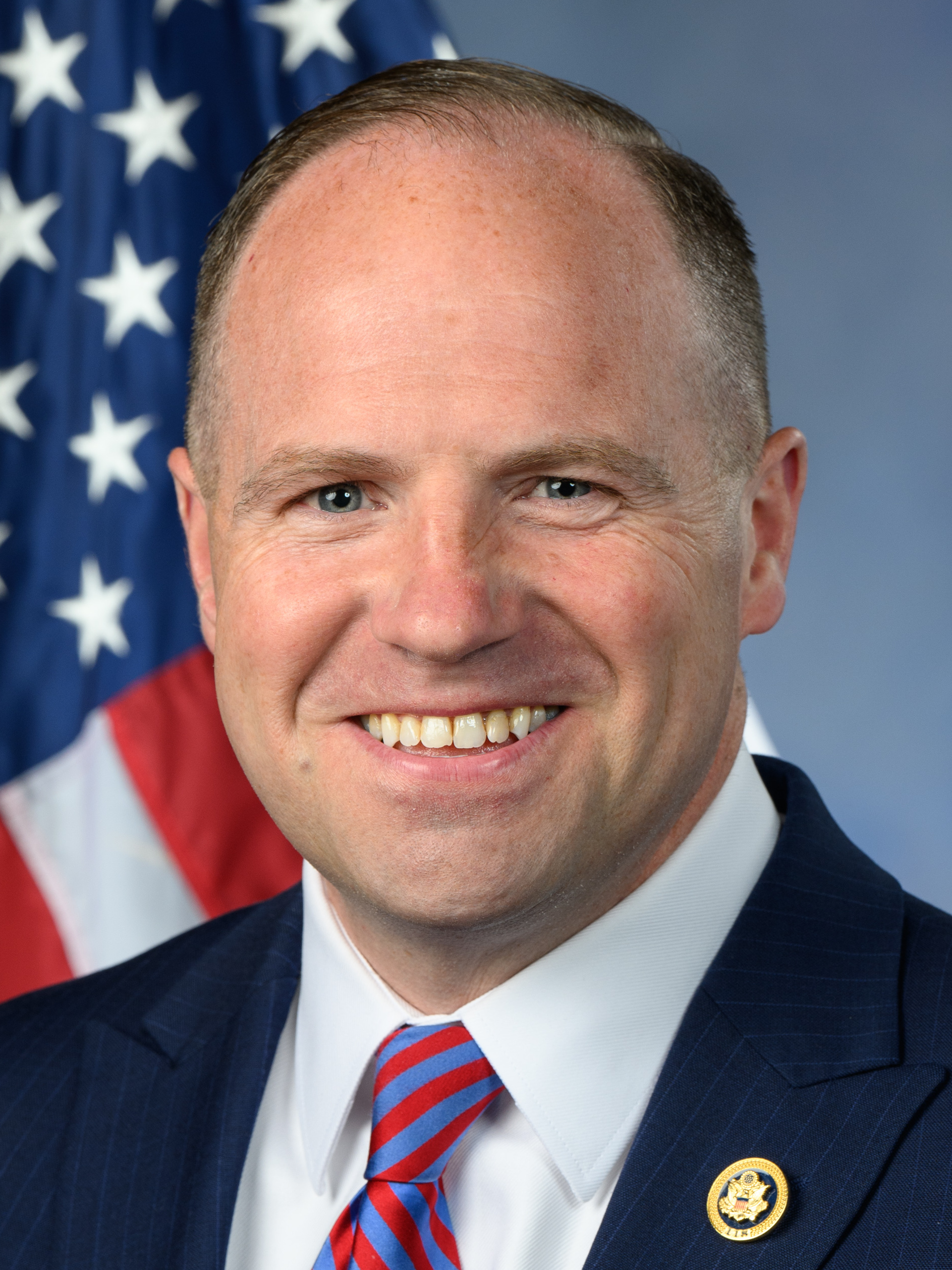

Nominee	Tim Kennedy	Anthony Marecki
Party	Democratic	Republican
Alliance	Working Families	Conservative
Popular vote	209,131	111,772
Percentage	65.2%	34.8%
- Kennedy: 50–60% 60–70% 70–80% 80–90% >90% Marecki: 50–60% 60–70% 80–90% Tie: 50% No votes
U.S. Representative before election
Tim Kennedy
Democratic
Elected U.S. Representative
Tim Kennedy
Democratic

The 26th district is based in the Buffalo-Niagara Falls area, including the more urban parts of Erie County and western Niagara County. The incumbent was Democrat Brian Higgins, who was re-elected with 63.94% of the vote in 2022. Higgins resigned on February 2, 2024, to become president of Shea's Performing Arts Center.

=== Democratic primary ===
==== Nominee ====
- Tim Kennedy, incumbent U.S. representative

==== Disqualified ====
- Nate McMurray, former town supervisor of Grand Island and nominee for the 27th district in 2018 and 2020

==== Declined ====
- Byron Brown, mayor of Buffalo (2006–present), former chair of the New York Democratic Party (2016–2019), and former state senator from the 60th district (2001–2005)
- Brian Higgins, former U.S. representative (2005–2024) (resigned February 2, 2024)
- Mark Poloncarz, Erie County executive (2012–present)

==== Endorsements ====
Tim Kennedy

Organizations

- AIPAC
- New York League of Conservation Voters

Labor unions

- LiUNA! New York
- New York State Nurses Association

Political parties

- Working Families Party

==== Fundraising ====
Campaign finance reports as of June 5, 2024
Candidate	Raised	Spent	Cash on hand
Tim Kennedy (D)	$2,031,202	$1,729,256	$301,945
Source: Federal Election Commission

=== Republican primary ===
==== Nominee ====
- Anthony Marecki, insurance claims analyst

=== General election ===
==== Prediction ====
Source	Ranking	As of
The Cook Political Report	Solid D	December 1, 2023
Inside Elections	Solid D	December 1, 2023
Sabato's Crystal Ball	Safe D	February 23, 2023
Elections Daily	Safe D	September 7, 2023
CNalysis	Solid D	November 16, 2023

==== Results ====
2024 New York's 26th congressional district election
Party	Candidate	Votes	%
Democratic	Tim Kennedy	190,668	59.4
Working Families	Tim Kennedy	18,463	5.8
Total	Tim Kennedy (incumbent)	209,131	65.2
Republican	Anthony Marecki	95,035	29.6
Conservative	Anthony Marecki	16,737	5.2
Total	Anthony Marecki	111,772	34.8
Total votes		320,903	100.0
Democratic hold			

== Notes ==
Partisan clients
