= 2024 United States House of Representatives elections =

House elections for the 119th U.S. Congress

- November 5, 2024

All 435 seats in the United States House of Representatives (Note: As well as the six non-voting delegates.) 218 seats needed for a majority
- Turnout: 149.5 Million, 61.3% of voting eligible population
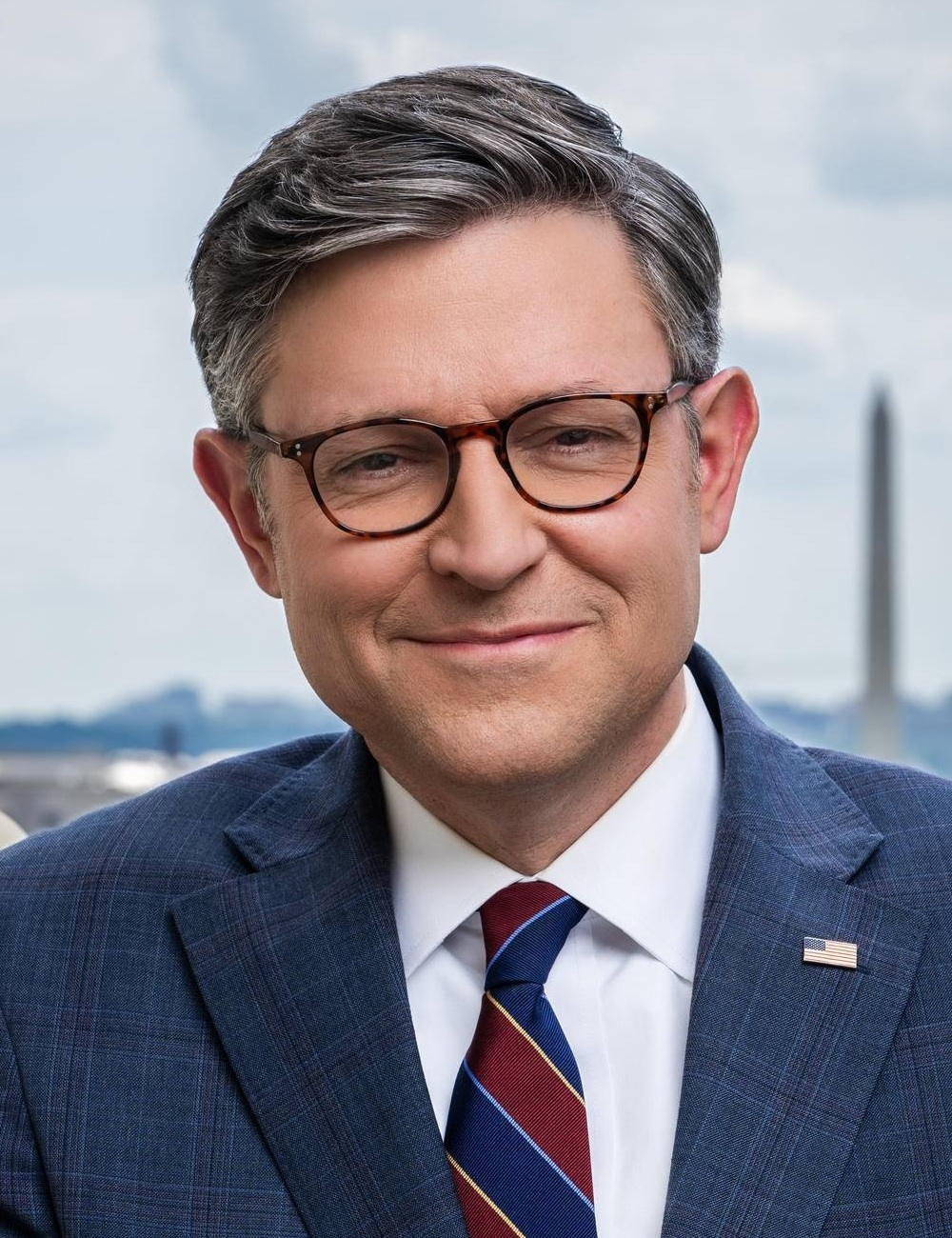

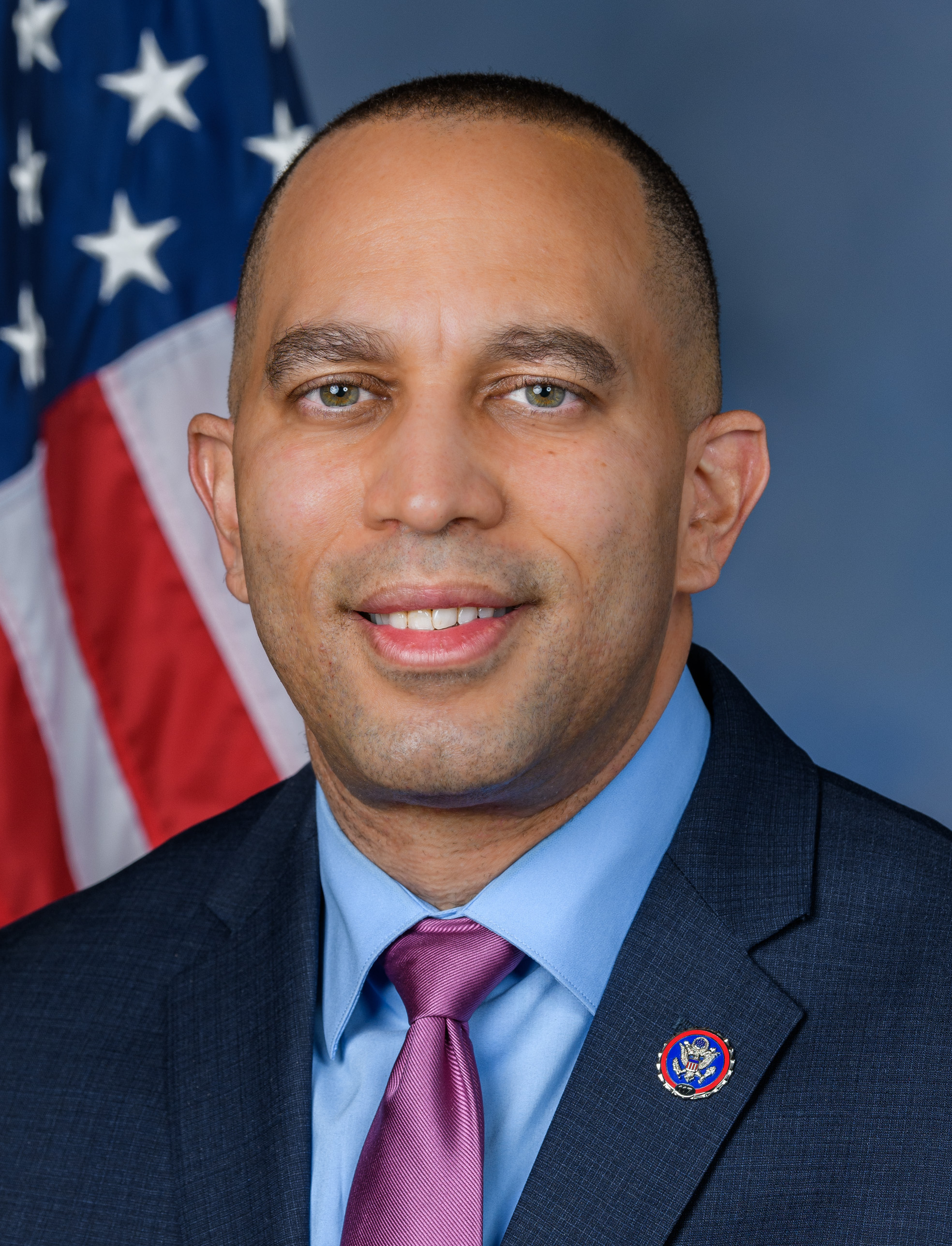
	Majority party	Minority party
Leader	Mike Johnson	Hakeem Jeffries
Party	Republican	Democratic
Leader since	October 25, 2023	January 3, 2023
Leader's seat	Louisiana 4th	New York 8th
Last election	222 seats, 50.0%	213 seats, 47.3%
Seats before	222	212
Seats won	220	215
Seat change	▼2	▲2
Popular vote	74,390,864	70,571,330
Percentage	49.8%	47.2%
Swing	▼0.2 pp	▼0.1 pp
- Democratic hold Democratic gain Republican hold Republican gain
Speaker before election
Mike Johnson
Republican
Elected Speaker
Mike Johnson
Republican

The 2024 United States House of Representatives elections were held on November 5, 2024, to elect the 435 representatives of the United States House of Representatives, as well as 6 non-voting delegates from the District of Columbia and inhabited U.S. territories. The elections were held together with other federal, state, and local elections, including the U.S. presidential election and elections to the Senate, as part of the 2024 United States general election. The winners of these elections serve in the 119th United States Congress, with seats apportioned among states based on the 2020 United States census.

The House Republican Conference has been led by Mike Johnson since October 2023, following the removal of Kevin McCarthy as Speaker of the House and the speaker election that Johnson won. He is the first congressman from Louisiana to be elected Speaker of the House.

With the election of Hakeem Jeffries as leader of the House Democratic Caucus, this was the first House election since 2002 in which the Democratic Party was not led by Nancy Pelosi. Jeffries is the first African American in the history of Congress to serve as leader of either party, and the first congressman from New York to do so since Bertrand Snell's retirement in 1938.

The election was expected to be highly competitive, with forecasts suggesting less than a five-seat difference between the two parties. Events that have occurred during the 118th Congress include the January 2023 speakership election, the 2023 debt-ceiling crisis, the removal of Kevin McCarthy from the speakership, the ensuing October 2023 speakership election, and the expulsion of George Santos. No party has lost House control after a single congressional term since 1954.

The Republicans, led by incumbent Speaker Mike Johnson, narrowly maintained control of the House with a small majority of 220 seats (the narrowest since 1930), winning the House popular vote by 4 million votes and a narrow margin of 2.6%. This resulted in the smallest Republican majority since 2000. Democrats made a net gain of 1 seat from the Republicans, which represents the smallest net change in US history in the House of Representatives. (Note: This does not include the 2024 New York's 3rd congressional district special election, which Democrats picked up in February 2024 and held in November.) The majority was decided by just over 7,000 votes across three congressional districts (Iowa's 1st, Colorado's 8th, and Pennsylvania's 7th) out of nearly 148 million cast in these elections; this was a roughly 2-point bias in favor of Democrats, resulting from Democratic outperformance in swing districts. Despite the Democratic overperformance, the results gave Republicans a slim government trifecta for the first time since the 115th Congress, after the 2016 election.

These elections marked the first time since 2016 where Republicans won a majority of the congressional delegation in Pennsylvania and Michigan. They also marked the first time since 2008 in which Democrats won more than one seat in Alabama, and the first time since 2006 when Democrats won more than one seat in Louisiana. However, both cases were due to new seats created by redistricting. These elections saw Republicans win the majority of congressional districts in 30 states while the Democrats won a majority in 18 states. Two states (Colorado and Minnesota) elected a split house delegation. Sarah McBride of Delaware became the first openly transgender member elected to the United States Congress. This was the third presidential election cycle in a row in which the victorious presidential party lost seats in the House while holding its majority.

== Electoral system ==
Forty-six states used the first-past-the-post voting plurality-win system to elect their representatives. Instant-runoff voting was used in two states (Alaska and Maine), and the runoff system was used in two states (Georgia and Louisiana).

== Results ==
=== Federal ===
The 2024 election results are compared below to the 2022 election. The table does not include blank and over or under votes, both of which were included in the official results.

↓
220	215
Republican	Democratic

Parties	Popular vote			Seats			Strength
Parties	Vote	%	Change	2022	2024	+/−	Strength
Republican Party	74,390,864	49.75%	-0.28pp	222	220	▼2	50.6%
Democratic Party	70,571,330	47.19%	-0.10pp	213	215	▲2	49.4%
Independent	852,373	0.57%	+0.10pp	—	—	—	—
Libertarian Party	709,405	0.47%	-0.20pp	—	—	—	—
Green Party	182,841	0.12%	+0.06pp	—	—	—	—
Constitution Party	179,149	0.12%	+0.09pp	—	—	—	—
Other parties	2,545,275	1.70%	+0.33pp	—	—	—	—
Write-ins	112,184	0.08%	-0.02pp	—	—	—	—
Totals	149,543,421	100.00%	—	435	435	Steady	100.00%
Source: "Election Statistics – Office of the Clerk".

=== Per state ===
State	Total seats	Republican		Democratic	
State	Total seats	Seats	Change	Seats	Change
Alabama	7	5	▼1	2	▲1
Alaska	1	1	▲1	0	▼1
Arizona	9	6	Steady	3	Steady
Arkansas	4	4	Steady	0	Steady
California	52	9	▼3	43	▲3
Colorado	8	4	▲1	4	▼1
Connecticut	5	0	Steady	5	Steady
Delaware	1	0	Steady	1	Steady
Florida	28	20	Steady	8	Steady
Georgia	14	9	Steady	5	Steady
Hawaii	2	0	Steady	2	Steady
Idaho	2	2	Steady	0	Steady
Illinois	17	3	Steady	14	Steady
Indiana	9	7	Steady	2	Steady
Iowa	4	4	Steady	0	Steady
Kansas	4	3	Steady	1	Steady
Kentucky	6	5	Steady	1	Steady
Louisiana	6	4	▼1	2	▲1
Maine	2	0	Steady	2	Steady
Maryland	8	1	Steady	7	Steady
Massachusetts	9	0	Steady	9	Steady
Michigan	13	7	▲1	6	▼1
Minnesota	8	4	Steady	4	Steady
Mississippi	4	3	Steady	1	Steady
Missouri	8	6	Steady	2	Steady
Montana	2	2	Steady	0	Steady
Nebraska	3	3	Steady	0	Steady
Nevada	4	1	Steady	3	Steady
New Hampshire	2	0	Steady	2	Steady
New Jersey	12	3	Steady	9	Steady
New Mexico	3	0	Steady	3	Steady
New York	26	7	▼4	19	▲4
North Carolina	14	10	▲3	4	▼3
North Dakota	1	1	Steady	0	Steady
Ohio	15	10	Steady	5	Steady
Oklahoma	5	5	Steady	0	Steady
Oregon	6	1	▼1	5	▲1
Pennsylvania	17	10	▲2	7	▼2
Rhode Island	2	0	Steady	2	Steady
South Carolina	7	6	Steady	1	Steady
South Dakota	1	1	Steady	0	Steady
Tennessee	9	8	Steady	1	Steady
Texas	38	25	Steady	13	Steady
Utah	4	4	Steady	0	Steady
Vermont	1	0	Steady	1	Steady
Virginia	11	5	Steady	6	Steady
Washington	10	2	Steady	8	Steady
West Virginia	2	2	Steady	0	Steady
Wisconsin	8	6	Steady	2	Steady
Wyoming	1	1	Steady	0	Steady
Total	435	220	▼2	215	▲2

House seats
Republican	50.6%
Democratic	49.4%

=== Maps ===
House seats by party holding majority in state

Net changes to U.S. House seats after the 2024 elections
+1 Dem House seat +3 Dem House seats
+1 Rep House seat +2 Rep House seats
+3 Rep House seats

Popular vote and seat total in each state

Winner's vote share in each district

== Retirements ==
Retiring incumbents by district Democratic incumbent ran Democratic incumbent retired or lost renomination Republican incumbent ran Republican incumbent retired or lost renomination Vacant or no incumbent ran

A total of 46 representatives and 2 non-voting delegates (25 Democrats and 23 Republicans) retired, 19 of whom (12 Democrats and 7 Republicans) retired to run for other offices.

=== Democratic ===
1. Arizona 3: Ruben Gallego retired to run for the U.S. Senate.
2. California 12: Barbara Lee retired to run for the U.S. Senate.
3. California 16: Anna Eshoo retired.
4. California 29: Tony Cárdenas retired.
5. California 30: Adam Schiff retired to run for the U.S. Senate.
6. California 31: Grace Napolitano retired.
7. California 47: Katie Porter retired to run for the U.S. Senate.
8. Delaware at-large: Lisa Blunt Rochester retired to run for the U.S. Senate.
9. Maryland 2: Dutch Ruppersberger retired.
10. Maryland 3: John Sarbanes retired.
11. Maryland 6: David Trone retired to run for the U.S. Senate.
12. Michigan 7: Elissa Slotkin retired to run for the U.S. Senate.
13. Michigan 8: Dan Kildee retired.
14. Minnesota 3: Dean Phillips retired (initially ran for President of the United States).
15. New Hampshire 2: Annie Kuster retired.
16. New Jersey 3: Andy Kim retired to run for the U.S. Senate.
17. North Carolina 6: Kathy Manning retired due to redistricting.
18. North Carolina 13: Wiley Nickel retired due to redistricting.
19. North Carolina 14: Jeff Jackson retired to run for attorney general of North Carolina due to redistricting.
20. Northern Mariana Islands at-large: Gregorio Sablan retired.
21. Oregon 3: Earl Blumenauer retired.
22. Texas 32: Colin Allred retired to run for the U.S. Senate.
23. Virginia 7: Abigail Spanberger retired to run for governor of Virginia.
24. Virginia 10: Jennifer Wexton retired.

=== Republican ===
1. Arizona 8: Debbie Lesko retired to run for the Maricopa County Board of Supervisors.
2. Colorado 4: Greg Lopez retired.
3. Colorado 5: Doug Lamborn retired.
4. Florida 8: Bill Posey retired.
5. Georgia 3: Drew Ferguson retired.
6. Indiana 3: Jim Banks retired to run for the U.S. Senate.
7. Indiana 6: Greg Pence retired.
8. Indiana 8: Larry Bucshon retired.
9. Louisiana 6: Garret Graves retired due to redistricting.
10. Missouri 3: Blaine Luetkemeyer retired.
11. Montana 2: Matt Rosendale retired (initially ran for the U.S. Senate).
12. North Carolina 8: Dan Bishop retired to run for attorney general of North Carolina.
13. North Carolina 10: Patrick McHenry retired.
14. North Dakota at-large: Kelly Armstrong retired to run for governor of North Dakota.
15. Ohio 2: Brad Wenstrup retired.
16. Puerto Rico at-large: Jenniffer González-Colón retired to run for governor of Puerto Rico.
17. South Carolina 3: Jeff Duncan retired.
18. Texas 12: Kay Granger retired.
19. Texas 26: Michael C. Burgess retired.
20. Utah 3: John Curtis retired to run for the U.S. Senate.
21. Washington 5: Cathy McMorris Rodgers retired.
22. West Virginia 2: Alex Mooney retired to run for the U.S. Senate.

== Resignation and deaths ==
Three seats were left vacant on the day of the general election due to resignation or deaths in 2024, one of which was not filled until the next Congress.

=== Democratic ===
Two Democrats died in office.

1. New Jersey 9: Bill Pascrell died on August 21, 2024.
2. Texas 18: Sheila Jackson Lee died on July 19, 2024. A special election to fill the remainder of her term was held concurrently with the general election for the next full term, won by Erica Lee Carter.

=== Republican ===
One Republican resigned before the end of the term.

1. Wisconsin 8: Mike Gallagher resigned on April 24. A special election to fill the remainder of his term was held concurrently with the general election for the next full term, won by Tony Wied.

== Incumbents defeated ==
=== In primary elections ===
==== Democratic ====
Two Democrats lost renomination.

1. Missouri 1: Cori Bush lost renomination to Wesley Bell, who won the general election.
2. New York 16: Jamaal Bowman lost renomination to George Latimer, who won the general election.

==== Republicans ====
Two Republicans lost renomination.

1. Alabama 1: Jerry Carl lost a redistricting race to fellow incumbent Barry Moore, who won the general election.
2. Virginia 5: Bob Good lost renomination to John McGuire, who won the general election.

=== In general elections ===
==== Democrats ====
Four Democrats, one of whom was a freshman, lost re-election to Republicans.

1. Alaska at-large: Mary Peltola (first elected in a 2022 special election) lost to Nick Begich III.
2. Colorado 8: Yadira Caraveo (first elected in 2022) lost to Gabe Evans.
3. Pennsylvania 7: Susan Wild (first elected in 2018) lost to Ryan Mackenzie.
4. Pennsylvania 8: Matt Cartwright (first elected in 2012) lost to Rob Bresnahan.

==== Republicans ====
Seven Republicans, five of whom were freshmen, lost re-election to Democrats.

1. California 13: John Duarte (first elected in 2022) lost to Adam Gray.
2. California 27: Mike Garcia (first elected in 2020) lost to George Whitesides.
3. California 45: Michelle Steel (first elected in 2020) lost to Derek Tran.
4. New York 4: Anthony D'Esposito (first elected in 2022) lost to Laura Gillen.
5. New York 19: Marc Molinaro (first elected in 2022) lost to Josh Riley.
6. New York 22: Brandon Williams (first elected in 2022) lost to John Mannion.
7. Oregon 5: Lori Chavez-DeRemer (first elected in 2022) lost to Janelle Bynum.

== Open seats that changed parties ==
=== Republican seats won by Democrats ===
Three Republican seats were won by Democrats.

1. Alabama 2: Won by Shomari Figures.
2. Louisiana 6: Won by Cleo Fields.
3. Puerto Rico at-large: Won by Pablo Hernández Rivera.

=== Democratic seats won by Republicans ===
Five Democratic seats were won by Republicans.

1. Michigan 7: Won by Tom Barrett.
2. North Carolina 6: Won by Addison McDowell.
3. North Carolina 13: Won by Brad Knott.
4. North Carolina 14: Won by Tim Moore.
5. Northern Mariana Islands at-large: Won by Kimberlyn King-Hinds.

== Open seats that parties held ==
=== Democratic seats held by Democrats ===
Democrats held twenty-four of their open seats.

1. Arizona 3: Won by Yassamin Ansari.
2. California 12: Won by Lateefah Simon.
3. California 16: Won by Sam Liccardo.
4. California 29: Won by Luz Rivas.
5. California 30: Won by Laura Friedman.
6. California 31: Won by Gil Cisneros.
7. California 47: Won by Dave Min.
8. Delaware at-large: Won by Sarah McBride.
9. Maryland 2: Won by Johnny Olszewski.
10. Maryland 3: Won by Sarah Elfreth.
11. Maryland 6: Won by April McClain Delaney.
12. Michigan 8: Won by Kristen McDonald Rivet.
13. Minnesota 3: Won by Kelly Morrison.
14. Missouri 1: Won by Wesley Bell.
15. New Hampshire 2: Won by Maggie Goodlander.
16. New Jersey 3: Won by Herb Conaway.
17. New Jersey 9: Won by Nellie Pou.
18. New York 16: Won by George Latimer.
19. Oregon 3: Won by Maxine Dexter.
20. Texas 18: Won by Sylvester Turner.
21. Texas 32: Won by Julie Johnson.
22. Virginia 7: Won by Eugene Vindman.
23. Virginia 10: Won by Suhas Subramanyam.
24. Washington 6: Won by Emily Randall.

=== Republican seats held by Republicans ===
Republicans held twenty-three of their open seats.

1. Arizona 8: Won by Abraham Hamadeh.
2. Colorado 3: Won by Jeff Hurd.
3. Colorado 5: Won by Jeff Crank.
4. Florida 8: Won by Mike Haridopolos.
5. Georgia 3: Won by Brian Jack.
6. Indiana 3: Won by Marlin Stutzman.
7. Indiana 6: Won by Jefferson Shreve.
8. Indiana 8: Won by Mark Messmer.
9. Kansas 2: Won by Derek Schmidt.
10. Missouri 3: Won by Bob Onder.
11. Montana 2: Won by Troy Downing.
12. North Carolina 8: Won by Mark Harris.
13. North Carolina 10: Won by Pat Harrigan.
14. North Dakota at-large: Won by Julie Fedorchak.
15. Ohio 2: Won by David Taylor.
16. South Carolina 3: Won by Sheri Biggs.
17. Texas 12: Won by Craig Goldman.
18. Texas 26: Won by Brandon Gill.
19. Utah 3: Won by Mike Kennedy.
20. Virginia 5: Won by John McGuire.
21. Washington 5: Won by Michael Baumgartner.
22. West Virginia 2: Won by Riley Moore.
23. Wisconsin 8: Won by Tony Wied, who also won the district's special election.

== Crossover seats ==
This is a list of congressional seats that voted for one party in the 2020 presidential election and another in the 2022 House elections.

=== Democratic ===
This lists the districts in which Donald Trump won in 2020 that were represented by Democrats.

District			Incumbent				Result
Location	2022 PVI	Trump 2020	Member	Party	First elected	Margin 2022	Result
Alaska at-large	R+8	R+10.1	Mary Peltola	Democratic	2022 (special)	D+9.9	Begich (flip)
Maine 2	R+6	R+7.4	Jared Golden	Democratic	2018	D+6.1	Golden
North Carolina 6	R+11 (Note: State enacted a new congressional map after the most recent publication of the Cook PVI.)	R+16.3	Kathy Manning (Note: Manning was first elected to a previous, Democratic, version of this district which Biden won by 12.4 points in 2020, but it was redrawn to be Republican-leaning in 2023 by the North Carolina state legislature.) (retiring)	Democratic	2020	D+8.9	McDowell (flip)
North Carolina 13	R+11	R+17.2	Wiley Nickel (Note: Nickel was first elected to a previous, competitive version of this district which Biden won by 1.7 points in 2020, but it was redrawn to be Republican-leaning in 2023 by the North Carolina state legislature.) (retiring)	Democratic	2022	D+3.2	Knott (flip)
North Carolina 14	R+11	R+16.1	Jeff Jackson (Note: Jackson was first elected to a previous, Democratic, version of this district which Biden won by 16.3 points in 2020, but it was redrawn to be Republican-leaning in 2023 by the North Carolina state legislature.) (retiring)	Democratic	2022	D+15.4	Moore (flip)
Ohio 9	R+3	R+2.9	Marcy Kaptur	Democratic	1982	D+13.2	Kaptur
Pennsylvania 8	R+4	R+2.9	Matt Cartwright	Democratic	2012	D+2.4	Bresnahan (flip)
Washington 3	R+5	R+4.2	Marie Gluesenkamp Perez	Democratic	2022	D+0.8	Gluesenkamp Perez

=== Republican ===
This lists the districts in which Joe Biden won in 2020 that were represented by Republicans.

District			Incumbent				Result
Location	2022 PVI	Biden 2020	Member	Party	First elected	Margin 2022	Result
Alabama 2	D+4	D+12.4	Barry Moore (Note: Moore was first elected to a previous, Republican-leaning, version of this district which Trump won by 29.4 points in 2020, but it was redrawn to have a majority-Black electorate in 2023 due to a court order.) (running in the 1st district)	Republican	2020	R+40	Figures (flip)
Arizona 1	R+2	D+1.5	David Schweikert	Republican	2010	R+0.8	Schweikert
Arizona 6	R+3	D+0.1	Juan Ciscomani	Republican	2022	R+1.4	Ciscomani
California 13	D+4	D+10.9	John Duarte	Republican	2022	R+0.4	Gray (flip)
California 22	D+5	D+13.0	David Valadao	Republican	2012; 2018 (lost); 2020	R+3.0	Valadao
California 27	D+4	D+12.4	Mike Garcia	Republican	2020 (special)	R+6.4	Whitesides (flip)
California 40	R+2	D+1.9	Young Kim	Republican	2020	R+13.6	Kim
California 45	D+2	D+6.1	Michelle Steel	Republican	2020	R+4.8	Tran (flip)
Louisiana 6	D+8	D+19.9	Garret Graves (Note: Graves was first elected to a previous, Republican-leaning, version of this district which Trump won by 33.7 points in 2020, but it was redrawn to have a majority-Black electorate in 2024 due to a court order.) (retiring)	Republican	2014	R+67.4	Fields (flip)
Nebraska 2	EVEN	D+6.4	Don Bacon	Republican	2016	R+2.6	Bacon
New Jersey 7	R+1	D+3.8	Thomas Kean Jr.	Republican	2022	R+2.6	Kean Jr.
New York 4	D+5	D+14.5	Anthony D'Esposito	Republican	2022	R+3.6	Gillen (flip)
New York 17	D+3	D+10.1	Mike Lawler	Republican	2022	R+0.6	Lawler
New York 19	R+1	D+4.4	Marc Molinaro	Republican	2022	R+1.6	Riley (flip)
New York 22	D+3	D+11.3	Brandon Williams	Republican	2022	R+1.9	Mannion (flip)
Oregon 5	D+2	D+8.8	Lori Chavez-DeRemer	Republican	2022	R+2.2	Bynum (flip)
Pennsylvania 1	EVEN	D+4.6	Brian Fitzpatrick	Republican	2016	R+9.8	Fitzpatrick
Virginia 2	R+2	D+1.9	Jen Kiggans	Republican	2022	R+3.4	Kiggans

== Mid-decade redistricting changes ==
In the United States, all states with multiple congressional districts are required to revise their district maps following each decennial census to account for population changes. In 2024, most states used the same districts created in the redistricting cycle following the 2020 census, which were first used in the 2022 elections. However, maps have changed or would change in several states, often due to legal challenges made on the basis of political or racial gerrymandering.

As of May 2024, several states have seen challenges to their congressional district maps that were put in place during the redistricting cycle brought upon by the results of the 2020 census. In Alabama, a special master drew a new map after the state legislature submitted a map that did not comply with the Voting Rights Act after the Supreme Court ruled their original map violated the Voting Rights Act in Allen v. Milligan, requiring the creation of a second predominantly Black district. Similarly, a judge in Georgia ruled that Georgia's maps were illegally racially gerrymandered and the Georgia General Assembly drew a new map that added a new predominantly Black district. In Louisiana, the Supreme Court's decision not to intervene in Robinson v. Ardoin led to a second majority Black district being drawn in that state as well, although this map was struck down after a legal challenge by some Louisianans before the Supreme Court of the United States issued an emergency order allowing the new map to be used in the 2024 elections. On the other hand, Republican legislators in North Carolina drew a map placing three Democratic incumbents in Republican-leaning districts after the North Carolina Supreme Court ruled that partisan gerrymandering is not justiciable, which in turn was canceled out by a map passed after a similar state court ruling in New York that made three highly competitive districts somewhat Democratic-leaning. Other racial gerrymandering cases in Arkansas, Florida, South Carolina, Tennessee and Texas and another partisan gerrymandering case in Utah were not resolved before the filing deadlines for the 2024 Congressional elections in those states; South Carolina's districts were ultimately upheld by the Supreme Court of the United States over a month after the state's filing deadline.

Summary of mid-decade changes to congressional districts in advance of the 2024 election cycle
State (linked to summaries below)	Status	Notes	Ref	Change in partisanship (Note: Competitive seats are defined as seats won by less than 10 points by their respective party in 2020)		
State (linked to summaries below)	Status	Notes	Ref	D	C	R
Alabama	New districts enacted on October 5, 2023	A federal district court selected a new map, creating a second majority-Black district in the state following the U.S. Supreme Court's decision in Allen v. Milligan. The map is set to face further litigation after the election.		▲1	Steady	▼1
Arkansas	Previous districts left in place	Arkansas's map has faced multiple lawsuits alleging racial gerrymandering diluting the voting power of black voters by splitting Little Rock into three districts; the case was heard in a federal district court, then by a three-judge panel in a circuit court. After the panel ruled private individuals could not sue under the Voting Rights Act, the plaintiffs did not appeal the case.		Steady	Steady	Steady
Georgia	New districts enacted on December 28, 2023	A federal district judge ruled on October 26, 2023, that Georgia's districts are racially gerrymandered and ordered a new map with an additional majority-Black district be proposed by December 8; the Georgia Legislature convened a special session on November 29 to redraw the map. Despite a challenge, the proposed map was upheld.		Steady	Steady	Steady
Kentucky	Previous districts left in place	The Kentucky Supreme Court heard arguments in September 2023 in a suit alleging that the state legislature violated the state constitution by creating a partisan gerrymander in the state's congressional map by moving the state capital Frankfort to the heavily Republican 1st district; on December 14, 2023, the court affirmed a lower court ruling resulting in the case being dismissed.		Steady	Steady	Steady
Louisiana	New districts enacted on January 22, 2024	Following Allen v. Milligan regarding Alabama's maps, the U.S. Supreme Court unfroze a similar case, Robinson v. Ardoin, alleging racial gerrymandering in Louisiana's districts; following a federal district judge's order in the case, Louisiana legislators passed a new map, creating a second majority Black congressional district. On January 22, Governor Jeff Landry signed the new map into law. On April 30, the new map was struck down in a separate lawsuit but the U.S. Supreme Court issued an order on May 15 allowing the map to be used for the 2024 election. The map is set to face further litigation after the election.		▲1	Steady	▼1
New Mexico	Previous districts left in place	New Mexico's map faced a lawsuit alleging partisan gerrymandering diluting the voting power of Republicans. A state judge ruled to keep the current map in place, and that decision was upheld by the New Mexico Supreme Court in a ruling on November 27, 2023.		Steady	Steady	Steady
New York	New districts enacted on February 28, 2024	After a lower state court struck down the state legislature's proposed map in 2022 and enacted a map drawn by a special master, the New York Court of Appeals (the court of last resort) ruled on December 12, 2023, that those court-drawn districts were only meant to be temporary and that the Independent Redistricting Commission must draw new districts in advance of the 2024 cycle. On February 26, 2024, the New York State Legislature rejected the maps drawn by the commission and instead passed its own map resulting in the 3rd, 18th, and 22nd congressional districts becoming more Democratic leaning while the 1st becomes more Republican leaning. Kathy Hochul signed the map later that day.		▲2	▼2	Steady
North Carolina	New districts enacted on October 25, 2023	The General Assembly passed a new map placing three incumbent Democrats in Republican-leaning districts after Republicans gained a majority on the state supreme court in 2022 and ruled in April 2023 that claims of partisan gerrymandering are non-justiciable. The case is likely to be further litigated after 2024.		▼2	▼2	▲4
Ohio	Previous districts left in place	Following the retirement of the swing justice, Maureen O'Connor, and the election of a Republican majority, the Ohio Supreme Court dismissed challenges to its map in September 2023, maintaining the map it had established after previously finding in 2022 that the districts drawn by the state legislature violated the Ohio Constitution.		Steady	Steady	Steady
South Carolina	Previous districts left in place	The U.S. Supreme Court heard arguments on October 11, 2023, in Alexander v. South Carolina State Conference of the NAACP, in which the President of the South Carolina Senate sought to appeal a lower court ruling that found the state illegally discriminated against Black voters in passing an allegedly racially gerrymandered map. The lower court ruled on March 28, 2024, that the map would be used in the 2024 election as it is too late to adopt a remedial map and resolve the appeal before the U.S. Supreme Court before the election. The US Supreme Court later ruled on May 23 reversing the lower court ruling and upholding the congressional map. The map is set to face further litigation after the election.		Steady	Steady	Steady
Tennessee	Previous districts left in place	On August 9, 2023, a coalition of civil rights organizations and Tennessee voters filed a federal lawsuit against the state government challenging the state's Congressional district map that split nonwhite voters in Nashville among three decisively Republican-leaning Congressional districts as unconstitutionally intentionally racially discriminatory. The case was set to be heard in a federal district court, but a panel of three federal judges argued that the lawsuit needed to "do more than plausibly allege" that Tennessee lawmakers were aware their GOP-favored map would disadvantage minority voters supporting Democratic candidates, resulting in the case being dismissed on August 21, 2024. The map may face further litigation after the election.		Steady	Steady	Steady
Net change (as of August 21, 2024)				▲2	▼4	▲2

=== Newly created seats ===
The following districts had no incumbent representative as a result of redistricting.

1. Alabama 2
2. North Carolina 6

=== Seat with multiple incumbents running ===
The following district had multiple incumbent representatives running, the product of an incumbent of another district choosing to run in the seat against its own incumbent.

1. Alabama 1: Barry Moore (R) defeated Jerry Carl.

== Closest races ==
Sixty-nine races were decided by a margin of 10% or lower.

District	Winner	Margin
California 13th	Democratic (flip)	0.09%
Iowa 1st	Republican	0.19%
California 45th	Democratic (flip)	0.21%
Ohio 9th	Democratic	0.63%
Maine 2nd	Democratic	0.69%
Colorado 8th	Republican (flip)	0.73%
Pennsylvania 7th	Republican (flip)	1.01% (Note: This seat was the tipping point seat for a Republican majority.)
Pennsylvania 10th	Republican	1.26%
Pennsylvania 8th	Republican (flip)	1.62%
North Carolina 1st	Democratic	1.68%
Nebraska 2nd	Republican	1.85%
Ohio 13th	Democratic	2.21%
New York 19th	Democratic (flip)	2.22%
New York 4th	Democratic (flip)	2.29%
Alaska at-large	Republican (flip)	2.45%
Arizona 6th	Republican	2.51%
Texas 34th	Democratic	2.58%
Virginia 7th	Democratic	2.65%
California 27th	Democratic (flip)	2.66%
Wisconsin 3rd	Republican	2.73%
Oregon 5th	Democratic (flip)	2.73%
Nevada 3rd	Democratic	2.74%
California 47th	Democratic	2.88%
California 41st	Republican	3.38%
New York 3rd	Democratic	3.58%
California 9th	Democratic	3.58%
Michigan 7th	Republican (flip)	3.72%
Arizona 1st	Republican	3.81%
Iowa 3rd	Republican	3.83%
Virginia 2nd	Republican	3.85%
Washington 3rd	Democratic	3.89%
New Mexico 2nd	Democratic	4.16%
California 49th	Democratic	4.35%
Virginia 10th	Democratic	4.57%
Florida 23rd	Democratic	4.89%
New Jersey 9th	Democratic	4.89%
Colorado 3rd	Republican	4.98%
California 21st	Democratic	5.15%
New Jersey 7th	Republican	5.40%
Texas 28th	Democratic	5.63%
Washington 4th	Republican	5.97% (Note: Under Washington's "jungle primary" system, the general election was between two Republicans. The incumbent Republican won re-election.)
New Hampshire 2nd	Democratic	5.97%
Michigan 10th	Republican	6.13%
New York 17th	Republican	6.31%
Maryland 6th	Democratic	6.34%
Michigan 8th	Democratic	6.64%
Connecticut 5th	Democratic	6.82%
California 22nd	Republican	6.84%
Oregon 6th	Democratic	6.86%
Arizona 4th	Democratic	7.29%
Nevada 1st	Democratic	7.51%
Montana 1st	Republican	7.68%
Pennsylvania 17th	Democratic	7.75%
Oregon 4th	Democratic	7.78%
New Hampshire 1st	Democratic	8.07%
Nevada 4th	Democratic	8.09%
Washington 8th	Democratic	8.17%
Illinois 6th	Democratic	8.42%
Indiana 1st	Democratic	8.49%
New Jersey 3rd	Democratic	8.59%
Illinois 17th	Democratic	8.85%
Florida 25th	Democratic	8.96%
Arizona 2nd	Republican	8.97%
New York 22nd	Democratic (flip)	9.12%
Ohio 1st	Democratic	9.17%
Alabama 2nd	Democratic (flip)	9.20%
Florida 13th	Republican	9.65%
Michigan 3rd	Democratic	9.89%
Florida 22nd	Democratic	9.91%

== Special elections ==
There were eight special elections scheduled in 2024 to the 118th United States Congress, listed here by date and district.

District	Incumbent			This race	
District	Member	Party	First elected	Results	Candidates
New York 3	George Santos	Republican	2022	Incumbent expelled December 1, 2023. New member elected February 13, 2024. Democratic gain.	▌ ✓ Tom Suozzi (Democratic) 53.9%; ▌Mazi Melesa Pilip (Republican) 45.9%
New York 26	Brian Higgins	Democratic	2004	Incumbent resigned February 2, 2024. New member elected April 30, 2024. Democratic hold.	▌ ✓ Tim Kennedy (Democratic) 68.5%; ▌Gary Dickson (Republican) 31.3%
California 20	Kevin McCarthy	Republican	2006	Incumbent resigned December 31, 2023. New member elected May 21, 2024, after no candidate won a majority in the March 19 jungle primary. Republican hold.	▌ ✓ Vince Fong (Republican) 60.6%; ▌Mike Boudreaux (Republican) 39.4%
Ohio 6	Bill Johnson	Republican	2010	Incumbent resigned January 21, 2024. New member elected June 11, 2024. Republican hold.	▌ ✓ Michael Rulli (Republican) 54.6%; ▌Michael Kripchak (Democratic) 45.3%
Colorado 4	Ken Buck	Republican	2014	Incumbent resigned March 22, 2024. New member elected June 25, 2024. Republican hold.	▌ ✓ Greg Lopez (Republican) 58.4%; ▌Trisha Calvarese (Democratic) 34.4%; ▌Hannah Goodman (Libertarian) 5.3%; ▌Frank Atwood (Approval Voting) 1.9%
New Jersey 10	Donald Payne Jr.	Democratic	2012 (special)	Incumbent died April 24, 2024. New member elected September 18, 2024. Democratic hold.	▌ ✓ LaMonica McIver (Democratic) 81.4%; ▌Carmen Bucco (Republican) 15.6%; Others: ▌Russell Jenkins (Independent) 1.6%; ▌Rayfield Morton (Independent) 1.4%
Texas 18	Sheila Jackson Lee	Democratic	1994	Incumbent died July 19, 2024. New member elected November 5, 2024. Democratic hold.	▌ ✓ Erica Lee Carter (Democratic) 67.9%; ▌Maria Dunn (Republican) 22.2%; ▌Kevin Dural (Republican) 9.9%
Wisconsin 8	Mike Gallagher	Republican	2016	Incumbent resigned April 24, 2024. New member elected November 5, 2024. New member also elected to the next term; see below. Republican hold.	▌ ✓ Tony Wied (Republican) 57.4%; ▌Kristin Lyerly (Democratic) 42.6%

== Alabama ==
District		Incumbent			This race	
Location	PVI	Member	Party	First elected	Results	Candidates
Alabama 1	R+28 (Note: A new congressional map was enacted in October 2023, after the most recent (2022) publication of the Cook PVI.)	Jerry Carl	Republican	2020	Incumbent lost renomination. Republican loss.	▌ ✓ Barry Moore (Republican) 78.5%; ▌Tom Holmes (Democratic) 21.5%
Alabama 1	R+28	Barry Moore; Redistricted from the 2nd district	Republican	2020	Incumbent re-elected.	▌ ✓ Barry Moore (Republican) 78.5%; ▌Tom Holmes (Democratic) 21.5%
Alabama 2	D+4	None (new district)			New member elected. Democratic gain.	▌ ✓ Shomari Figures (Democratic) 54.6%; ▌Caroleene Dobson (Republican) 45.4%
Alabama 3	R+23	Mike Rogers	Republican	2002	Incumbent re-elected.	▌ ✓ Mike Rogers (Republican) 100%
Alabama 4	R+33	Robert Aderholt	Republican	1996	Incumbent re-elected.	▌ ✓ Robert Aderholt (Republican) 100%
Alabama 5	R+17	Dale Strong	Republican	2022	Incumbent re-elected.	▌ ✓ Dale Strong (Republican) 100%
Alabama 6	R+22	Gary Palmer	Republican	2014	Incumbent re-elected.	▌ ✓ Gary Palmer (Republican) 70.4%; ▌Elizabeth Anderson (Democratic) 29.6%
Alabama 7	D+12	Terri Sewell	Democratic	2010	Incumbent re-elected.	▌ ✓ Terri Sewell (Democratic) 63.7%; ▌Robin Litaker (Republican) 36.3%

== Alaska ==
District		Incumbent			This race	
Location	PVI	Member	Party	First elected	Results	Candidates
Alaska at-large	R+8	Mary Peltola	Democratic	2022 (special)	Incumbent lost re-election. Republican gain.	First round: ▌ Nick Begich III (Republican) 48.4%; ▌ Mary Peltola (Democratic) 46.4%; ▌John Howe (Independence) 3.9%; ▌Eric Hafner (Democratic) 1.0%; Instant runoff: ▌ ✓ Nick Begich III (Republican) 51.2%; ▌Mary Peltola (Democratic) 48.8%

== Arizona ==
District		Incumbent			This race	
Location	PVI	Member	Party	First elected	Results	Candidates
Arizona 1	R+2	David Schweikert	Republican	2010	Incumbent re-elected.	▌ ✓ David Schweikert (Republican) 51.9%; ▌Amish Shah (Democratic) 48.1%
Arizona 2	R+6	Eli Crane	Republican	2022	Incumbent re-elected.	▌ ✓ Eli Crane (Republican) 54.5%; ▌Jonathan Nez (Democratic) 45.5%
Arizona 3	D+24	Ruben Gallego	Democratic	2014	Incumbent retired to run for U.S. Senate. Democratic hold.	▌ ✓ Yassamin Ansari (Democratic) 70.9%; ▌Jeff Zink (Republican) 26.6%; ▌Alan Aversa (Green) 2.5%
Arizona 4	D+2	Greg Stanton	Democratic	2018	Incumbent re-elected.	▌ ✓ Greg Stanton (Democratic) 52.7%; ▌Kelly Cooper (Republican) 45.5%; ▌Vincent Beck-Jones (Green) 1.8%
Arizona 5	R+11	Andy Biggs	Republican	2016	Incumbent re-elected.	▌ ✓ Andy Biggs (Republican) 60.4%; ▌Katrina Schaffner (Democratic) 39.6%
Arizona 6	R+3	Juan Ciscomani	Republican	2022	Incumbent re-elected.	▌ ✓ Juan Ciscomani (Republican) 50.0%; ▌Kirsten Engel (Democratic) 47.5%; ▌Athena Eastwood (Green) 2.5%
Arizona 7	D+15	Raúl Grijalva	Democratic	2002	Incumbent re-elected.	▌ ✓ Raúl Grijalva (Democratic) 63.4%; ▌Daniel Butierez (Republican) 36.6%
Arizona 8	R+10	Debbie Lesko	Republican	2018 (special)	Incumbent retired to run for the Maricopa County Board of Supervisors. Republican hold.	▌ ✓ Abraham Hamadeh (Republican) 56.5%; ▌Greg Whitten (Democratic) 43.5%
Arizona 9	R+16	Paul Gosar	Republican	2010	Incumbent re-elected.	▌ ✓ Paul Gosar (Republican) 65.3%; ▌Quacy Smith (Democratic) 34.7%

== Arkansas ==
District		Incumbent			This race	
Location	PVI	Member	Party	First elected	Results	Candidates
Arkansas 1	R+22	Rick Crawford	Republican	2010	Incumbent re-elected.	▌ ✓ Rick Crawford (Republican) 72.9%; ▌Rodney Govens (Democratic) 24.0%; ▌Steve Parsons (Libertarian) 3.1%
Arkansas 2	R+9	French Hill	Republican	2014	Incumbent re-elected.	▌ ✓ French Hill (Republican) 58.9%; ▌Marcus Jones (Democratic) 41.1%
Arkansas 3	R+15	Steve Womack	Republican	2010	Incumbent re-elected.	▌ ✓ Steve Womack (Republican) 63.8%; ▌Caitlin Draper (Democratic) 31.8%; ▌Bobby Wilson (Libertarian) 4.4%
Arkansas 4	R+20	Bruce Westerman	Republican	2014	Incumbent re-elected.	▌ ✓ Bruce Westerman (Republican) 72.9%; ▌Risie Howard (Democratic) 27.1%

== California ==
District		Incumbent			This race	
Location	PVI	Member	Party	First elected	Results	Candidates
California 1	R+12	Doug LaMalfa	Republican	2012	Incumbent re-elected.	▌ ✓ Doug LaMalfa (Republican) 65.3%; ▌Rose Penelope Yee (Democratic) 34.7%
California 2	D+23	Jared Huffman	Democratic	2012	Incumbent re-elected.	▌ ✓ Jared Huffman (Democratic) 71.9%; ▌Chris Coulombe (Republican) 28.1%
California 3	R+4	Kevin Kiley	Republican	2022	Incumbent re-elected.	▌ ✓ Kevin Kiley (Republican) 55.5%; ▌Jessica Morse (Democratic) 44.5%
California 4	D+17	Mike Thompson	Democratic	1998	Incumbent re-elected.	▌ ✓ Mike Thompson (Democratic) 66.5%; ▌John Munn (Republican) 33.5%
California 5	R+9	Tom McClintock	Republican	2008	Incumbent re-elected.	▌ ✓ Tom McClintock (Republican) 61.8%; ▌Michael Barkley (Democratic) 38.2%
California 6	D+7	Ami Bera	Democratic	2012	Incumbent re-elected.	▌ ✓ Ami Bera (Democratic) 57.6%; ▌Christine Bish (Republican) 42.4%
California 7	D+17	Doris Matsui	Democratic	2005 (special)	Incumbent re-elected.	▌ ✓ Doris Matsui (Democratic) 66.8%; ▌Tom Silva (Republican) 33.2%
California 8	D+26	John Garamendi	Democratic	2009 (special)	Incumbent re-elected.	▌ ✓ John Garamendi (Democratic) 74.0%; ▌Rudy Recile (Republican) 26.0%
California 9	D+5	Josh Harder	Democratic	2018	Incumbent re-elected.	▌ ✓ Josh Harder (Democratic) 51.8%; ▌Kevin Lincoln (Republican) 48.2%
California 10	D+18	Mark DeSaulnier	Democratic	2014	Incumbent re-elected.	▌ ✓ Mark DeSaulnier (Democratic) 66.5%; ▌Katherine Piccinini (Republican) 33.5%
California 11	D+37	Nancy Pelosi	Democratic	1987 (special)	Incumbent re-elected.	▌ ✓ Nancy Pelosi (Democratic) 81.0%; ▌Bruce Lou (Republican) 19.0%
California 12	D+40	Barbara Lee	Democratic	1998 (special)	Incumbent retired to run for U.S. Senate. Democratic hold.	▌ ✓ Lateefah Simon (Democratic) 65.4%; ▌Jennifer Tran (Democratic) 34.6%
California 13	D+4	John Duarte	Republican	2022	Incumbent lost re-election. Democratic gain.	▌ ✓ Adam Gray (Democratic) 50.04%; ▌John Duarte (Republican) 49.96%
California 14	D+22	Eric Swalwell	Democratic	2012	Incumbent re-elected.	▌ ✓ Eric Swalwell (Democratic) 67.8%; ▌Vin Kruttiventi (Republican) 32.2%
California 15	D+28	Kevin Mullin	Democratic	2022	Incumbent re-elected.	▌ ✓ Kevin Mullin (Democratic) 73.1%; ▌Anna Cheng Kramer (Republican) 26.9%
California 16	D+26	Anna Eshoo	Democratic	1992	Incumbent retired. New member elected. Democratic hold.	▌ ✓ Sam Liccardo (Democratic) 58.2%; ▌Evan Low (Democratic) 41.8%
California 17	D+23	Ro Khanna	Democratic	2016	Incumbent re-elected.	▌ ✓ Ro Khanna (Democratic) 67.7%; ▌Anita Chen (Republican) 32.3%
California 18	D+21	Zoe Lofgren	Democratic	1994	Incumbent re-elected.	▌ ✓ Zoe Lofgren (Democratic) 64.6%; ▌Peter Hernandez (Republican) 35.4%
California 19	D+18	Jimmy Panetta	Democratic	2016	Incumbent re-elected.	▌ ✓ Jimmy Panetta (Democratic) 69.3%; ▌Jason Anderson (Republican) 30.7%
California 20	R+16	Vince Fong	Republican	2024 (special)	Incumbent re-elected.	▌ ✓ Vince Fong (Republican) 65.1%; ▌Mike Boudreaux (Republican) 34.9%
California 21	D+9	Jim Costa	Democratic	2004	Incumbent re-elected.	▌ ✓ Jim Costa (Democratic) 52.6%; ▌Michael Maher (Republican) 47.4%
California 22	D+5	David Valadao	Republican	2012; 2018 (lost); 2020	Incumbent re-elected.	▌ ✓ David Valadao (Republican) 53.4%; ▌Rudy Salas (Democratic) 46.6%
California 23	R+8	Jay Obernolte	Republican	2020	Incumbent re-elected.	▌ ✓ Jay Obernolte (Republican) 60.1%; ▌Derek Marshall (Democratic) 39.9%
California 24	D+13	Salud Carbajal	Democratic	2016	Incumbent re-elected.	▌ ✓ Salud Carbajal (Democratic) 62.7%; ▌Thomas Cole (Republican) 37.3%
California 25	D+6	Raul Ruiz	Democratic	2012	Incumbent re-elected.	▌ ✓ Raul Ruiz (Democratic) 56.3%; ▌Ian Weeks (Republican) 43.7%
California 26	D+8	Julia Brownley	Democratic	2012	Incumbent re-elected.	▌ ✓ Julia Brownley (Democratic) 56.1%; ▌Michael Koslow (Republican) 43.9%
California 27	D+4	Mike Garcia	Republican	2020 (special)	Incumbent lost re-election. Democratic gain.	▌ ✓ George Whitesides (Democratic) 51.3%; ▌Mike Garcia (Republican) 48.7%
California 28	D+16	Judy Chu	Democratic	2009 (special)	Incumbent re-elected.	▌ ✓ Judy Chu (Democratic) 64.9%; ▌April Verlato (Republican) 35.1%
California 29	D+26	Tony Cárdenas	Democratic	2012	Incumbent retired. Democratic hold.	▌ ✓ Luz Rivas (Democratic) 69.8%; ▌Benito Bernal (Republican) 30.2%
California 30	D+23	Adam Schiff	Democratic	2000	Incumbent retired to run for U.S. Senate. New member elected. Democratic hold.	▌ ✓ Laura Friedman (Democratic) 68.4%; ▌Alex Balekian (Republican) 31.6%
California 31	D+15	Grace Napolitano	Democratic	1998	Incumbent retired. Democratic hold.	▌ ✓ Gil Cisneros (Democratic) 59.7%; ▌Daniel Martinez (Republican) 40.3%
California 32	D+20	Brad Sherman	Democratic	1996	Incumbent re-elected.	▌ ✓ Brad Sherman (Democratic) 66.2%; ▌Larry Thompson (Republican) 33.8%
California 33	D+12	Pete Aguilar	Democratic	2014	Incumbent re-elected.	▌ ✓ Pete Aguilar (Democratic) 58.8%; ▌Tom Herman (Republican) 41.2%
California 34	D+32	Jimmy Gomez	Democratic	2017 (special)	Incumbent re-elected.	▌ ✓ Jimmy Gomez (Democratic) 55.6%; ▌David Kim (Democratic) 44.4%
California 35	D+13	Norma Torres	Democratic	2014	Incumbent re-elected.	▌ ✓ Norma Torres (Democratic) 58.4%; ▌Mike Cargile (Republican) 41.6%
California 36	D+21	Ted Lieu	Democratic	2014	Incumbent re-elected.	▌ ✓ Ted Lieu (Democratic) 68.7%; ▌Melissa Toomim (Republican) 31.3%
California 37	D+37	Sydney Kamlager-Dove	Democratic	2022	Incumbent re-elected.	▌ ✓ Sydney Kamlager-Dove (Democratic) 78.3%; ▌Juan Rey (No Party Preference) 21.7%
California 38	D+14	Linda Sánchez	Democratic	2002	Incumbent re-elected.	▌ ✓ Linda Sánchez (Democratic) 59.8%; ▌Eric Ching (Republican) 40.2%
California 39	D+12	Mark Takano	Democratic	2012	Incumbent re-elected.	▌ ✓ Mark Takano (Democratic) 56.7%; ▌David Serpa (Republican) 43.3%
California 40	R+2	Young Kim	Republican	2020	Incumbent re-elected.	▌ ✓ Young Kim (Republican) 55.3%; ▌Joe Kerr (Democratic) 44.7%
California 41	R+3	Ken Calvert	Republican	1992	Incumbent re-elected.	▌ ✓ Ken Calvert (Republican) 51.7%; ▌Will Rollins (Democratic) 48.3%
California 42	D+22	Robert Garcia	Democratic	2022	Incumbent re-elected.	▌ ✓ Robert Garcia (Democratic) 68.1%; ▌John Briscoe (Republican) 31.9%
California 43	D+32	Maxine Waters	Democratic	1990	Incumbent re-elected.	▌ ✓ Maxine Waters (Democratic) 75.1%; ▌Steve Williams (Republican) 24.9%
California 44	D+24	Nanette Barragán	Democratic	2016	Incumbent re-elected.	▌ ✓ Nanette Barragán (Democratic) 71.4%; ▌Roger Groh (Republican) 28.6%
California 45	D+2	Michelle Steel	Republican	2020	Incumbent lost re-election. New member elected. Democratic gain.	▌ ✓ Derek Tran (Democratic) 50.1%; ▌Michelle Steel (Republican) 49.9%
California 46	D+15	Lou Correa	Democratic	2016	Incumbent re-elected.	▌ ✓ Lou Correa (Democratic) 63.4%; ▌David Pan (Republican) 36.6%
California 47	D+3	Katie Porter	Democratic	2018	Incumbent retired to run for U.S. Senate. New member elected. Democratic hold.	▌ ✓ Dave Min (Democratic) 51.4%; ▌Scott Baugh (Republican) 48.6%
California 48	R+9	Darrell Issa	Republican	2000; 2018 (retired); 2020	Incumbent re-elected.	▌ ✓ Darrell Issa (Republican) 59.3%; ▌Stephen Houlahan (Democratic) 40.7%
California 49	D+3	Mike Levin	Democratic	2018	Incumbent re-elected.	▌ ✓ Mike Levin (Democratic) 52.2%; ▌Matt Gunderson (Republican) 47.8%
California 50	D+14	Scott Peters	Democratic	2012	Incumbent re-elected.	▌ ✓ Scott Peters (Democratic) 64.3%; ▌Peter Bono (Republican) 35.7%
California 51	D+12	Sara Jacobs	Democratic	2020	Incumbent re-elected.	▌ ✓ Sara Jacobs (Democratic) 60.7%; ▌Bill Wells (Republican) 39.3%
California 52	D+18	Juan Vargas	Democratic	2012	Incumbent re-elected.	▌ ✓ Juan Vargas (Democratic) 66.3%; ▌Justin Lee (Republican) 33.7%

== Colorado ==
District		Incumbent			This race	
Location	PVI	Member	Party	First elected	Results	Candidates
Colorado 1	D+29	Diana DeGette	Democratic	1996	Incumbent re-elected.	▌ ✓ Diana DeGette (Democratic) 76.6%; ▌Valdamar Archuleta (Republican) 21.6%; Others: ▌Critter Milton (Unity) 1.2%; ▌Daniel Lutz (Approval Voting) 0.7%
Colorado 2	D+17	Joe Neguse	Democratic	2018	Incumbent re-elected.	▌ ✓ Joe Neguse (Democratic) 68.4%; ▌Marshall Dawson (Republican) 28.9%; Others: ▌Gaylon Kent (Libertarian) 1.2%; ▌Cynthia Sirianni (Unity) 0.9%; ▌Jan Kok (Approval Voting) 0.6%
Colorado 3	R+7	Lauren Boebert	Republican	2020	Incumbent running in the 4th district. New member elected. Republican hold.	▌ ✓ Jeff Hurd (Republican) 50.8%; ▌Adam Frisch (Democratic) 45.8%; ▌James Wiley (Libertarian) 2.7%; ▌Adam Withrow (Unity) 0.7%
Colorado 4	R+13	Greg Lopez	Republican	2024 (special)	Incumbent retired. Republican hold.	▌ ✓ Lauren Boebert (Republican) 53.6%; ▌Trisha Calvarese (Democratic) 42.0%; ▌Hannah Goodman (Libertarian) 2.6%; Others: ▌Frank Atwood (Approval Voting) 1.4%; ▌Paul Fiorino (Unity) 0.3%
Colorado 5	R+9	Doug Lamborn	Republican	2006	Incumbent retired. Republican hold.	▌ ✓ Jeff Crank (Republican) 54.7%; ▌River Gassen (Democratic) 40.9%; Others: ▌Michael Vance (Libertarian) 1.8%; ▌Joseph Gaye (Independent) 1.1%; ▌Christopher Mitchell (Constitution) 1.1%; ▌Christopher Sweat (Forward) 0.4%
Colorado 6	D+9	Jason Crow	Democratic	2018	Incumbent re-elected.	▌ ✓ Jason Crow (Democratic) 59.0%; ▌John Fabbricatore (Republican) 38.5%; Others: ▌John Kittleson (Libertarian) 1.4%; ▌Travis Nicks (Approval Voting) 1.2%
Colorado 7	D+4	Brittany Pettersen	Democratic	2022	Incumbent re-elected.	▌ ✓ Brittany Pettersen (Democratic) 55.3%; ▌Sergei Matveyuk (Republican) 41.2%; ▌Patrick Bohan (Libertarian) 2.3%; ▌Ron Tupa (Unity) 1.2%
Colorado 8	EVEN	Yadira Caraveo	Democratic	2022	Incumbent lost re-election. Republican gain.	▌ ✓ Gabe Evans (Republican) 49.0%; ▌Yadira Caraveo (Democratic) 48.2%; Others: ▌Chris Baum (Approval Voting) 1.7%; ▌Susan Hall (Unity) 1.1%

== Connecticut ==
District		Incumbent			This race	
Location	PVI	Member	Party	First elected	Results	Candidates
Connecticut 1	D+12	John B. Larson	Democratic	1998	Incumbent re-elected.	▌ ✓ John B. Larson (Democratic) 63.1%; ▌Jim Griffin (Republican) 34.8%; ▌Mary Sanders (Green) 2.0%
Connecticut 2	D+3	Joe Courtney	Democratic	2006	Incumbent re-elected.	▌ ✓ Joe Courtney (Democratic) 58.0%; ▌Mike France (Republican) 42.0%
Connecticut 3	D+7	Rosa DeLauro	Democratic	1990	Incumbent re-elected.	▌ ✓ Rosa DeLauro (Democratic) 58.9%; ▌Michael Massey (Republican) 41.1%
Connecticut 4	D+13	Jim Himes	Democratic	2008	Incumbent re-elected.	▌ ✓ Jim Himes (Democratic) 61.1%; ▌Michael Goldstein (Republican) 37.3%; ▌Benjamin Wesley (Independent) 1.6%
Connecticut 5	D+3	Jahana Hayes	Democratic	2018	Incumbent re-elected.	▌ ✓ Jahana Hayes (Democratic) 53.4%; ▌George Logan (Republican) 46.6%

== Delaware ==
District		Incumbent			This race	
Location	PVI	Member	Party	First elected	Results	Candidates
Delaware at-large	D+7	Lisa Blunt Rochester	Democratic	2016	Incumbent retired to run for U.S. Senate. Democratic hold.	▌ ✓ Sarah McBride (Democratic) 57.9%; ▌John Whalen (Republican) 42.1%

== Florida ==
District		Incumbent			This race	
Location	PVI	Member	Party	First elected	Results	Candidates
Florida 1	R+19	Matt Gaetz	Republican	2016	Incumbent re-elected but resigned on November 13, 2024.	▌ ✓ Matt Gaetz (Republican) 66.0%; ▌Gay Valimont (Democratic) 34.0%
Florida 2	R+8	Neal Dunn	Republican	2016	Incumbent re-elected.	▌ ✓ Neal Dunn (Republican) 61.6%; ▌Yen Bailey (Democratic) 38.4%
Florida 3	R+9	Kat Cammack	Republican	2020	Incumbent re-elected.	▌ ✓ Kat Cammack (Republican) 61.6%; ▌Tom Wells (Democratic) 38.4%
Florida 4	R+6	Aaron Bean	Republican	2022	Incumbent re-elected.	▌ ✓ Aaron Bean (Republican) 57.3%; ▌LaShonda Holloway (Democratic) 42.7%
Florida 5	R+11	John Rutherford	Republican	2016	Incumbent re-elected.	▌ ✓ John Rutherford (Republican) 63.1%; ▌Jay McGovern (Democratic) 36.9%
Florida 6	R+14	Michael Waltz	Republican	2018	Incumbent re-elected.	▌ ✓ Michael Waltz (Republican) 66.5%; ▌James Stockton III (Democratic) 33.5%
Florida 7	R+5	Cory Mills	Republican	2022	Incumbent re-elected.	▌ ✓ Cory Mills (Republican) 56.5%; ▌Jennifer Adams (Democratic) 43.5%
Florida 8	R+11	Bill Posey	Republican	2008	Incumbent retired. Republican hold.	▌ ✓ Mike Haridopolos (Republican) 62.2%; ▌Sandy Kennedy (Democratic) 37.8%
Florida 9	D+8	Darren Soto	Democratic	2016	Incumbent re-elected.	▌ ✓ Darren Soto (Democratic) 55.1%; ▌Thomas Chalifoux (Republican) 42.6%; ▌Marcus Carter (Independent) 2.3%
Florida 10	D+14	Maxwell Frost	Democratic	2022	Incumbent re-elected.	▌ ✓ Maxwell Frost (Democratic) 62.4%; ▌Willie Montague (Republican) 37.6%
Florida 11	R+8	Daniel Webster	Republican	2010	Incumbent re-elected.	▌ ✓ Daniel Webster (Republican) 60.4%; ▌Barbie Hall (Democratic) 39.6%
Florida 12	R+17	Gus Bilirakis	Republican	2006	Incumbent re-elected.	▌ ✓ Gus Bilirakis (Republican) 71.0%; ▌Rock Aboujaoude Jr. (Democratic) 29.0%
Florida 13	R+6	Anna Paulina Luna	Republican	2022	Incumbent re-elected.	▌ ✓ Anna Paulina Luna (Republican) 54.8%; ▌Whitney Fox (Democratic) 45.2%
Florida 14	D+8	Kathy Castor	Democratic	2006	Incumbent re-elected.	▌ ✓ Kathy Castor (Democratic) 56.9%; ▌Rocky Rochford (Republican) 41.6%; Others: ▌Christopher Bradley (Independent) 0.7%; ▌Nathaniel Snyder (Libertarian) 0.7%
Florida 15	R+4	Laurel Lee	Republican	2022	Incumbent re-elected.	▌ ✓ Laurel Lee (Republican) 56.2%; ▌Pat Kemp (Democratic) 43.8%
Florida 16	R+7	Vern Buchanan	Republican	2006	Incumbent re-elected.	▌ ✓ Vern Buchanan (Republican) 59.5%; ▌Jan Schneider (Democratic) 40.5%
Florida 17	R+10	Greg Steube	Republican	2018	Incumbent re-elected.	▌ ✓ Greg Steube (Republican) 63.9%; ▌Manny Lopez (Democratic) 36.1%
Florida 18	R+13	Scott Franklin	Republican	2020	Incumbent re-elected.	▌ ✓ Scott Franklin (Republican) 65.3%; ▌Andrea Doria Kale (Democratic) 34.7%
Florida 19	R+13	Byron Donalds	Republican	2020	Incumbent re-elected.	▌ ✓ Byron Donalds (Republican) 66.3%; ▌Kari Lerner (Democratic) 33.7%
Florida 20	D+25	Sheila Cherfilus-McCormick	Democratic	2022 (special)	Incumbent re-elected.	▌ ✓ Sheila Cherfilus-McCormick (Democratic) 100%
Florida 21	R+7	Brian Mast	Republican	2016	Incumbent re-elected.	▌ ✓ Brian Mast (Republican) 61.8%; ▌Thomas Witkop (Democratic) 38.2%
Florida 22	D+7	Lois Frankel	Democratic	2012	Incumbent re-elected.	▌ ✓ Lois Frankel (Democratic) 55.0%; ▌Dan Franzese (Republican) 45.0%
Florida 23	D+5	Jared Moskowitz	Democratic	2022	Incumbent re-elected.	▌ ✓ Jared Moskowitz (Democratic) 52.4%; ▌Joe Kaufman (Republican) 47.6%
Florida 24	D+25	Frederica Wilson	Democratic	2010	Incumbent re-elected.	▌ ✓ Frederica Wilson (Democratic) 68.2%; ▌Jesus Navarro (Republican) 31.8%
Florida 25	D+9	Debbie Wasserman Schultz	Democratic	2004	Incumbent re-elected.	▌ ✓ Debbie Wasserman Schultz (Democratic) 54.5%; ▌Chris Eddy (Republican) 45.5%
Florida 26	R+8	Mario Díaz-Balart	Republican	2002	Incumbent re-elected.	▌ ✓ Mario Díaz-Balart (Republican) 70.9%; ▌Joey Atkins (Democratic) 29.1%
Florida 27	EVEN	María Elvira Salazar	Republican	2020	Incumbent re-elected.	▌ ✓ María Elvira Salazar (Republican) 60.4%; ▌Lucia Baez-Geller (Democratic) 39.6%
Florida 28	R+2	Carlos A. Giménez	Republican	2020	Incumbent re-elected.	▌ ✓ Carlos A. Giménez (Republican) 64.6%; ▌Phil Ehr (Democratic) 35.4%

== Georgia ==
District		Incumbent			This race	
Location	PVI	Member	Party	First elected	Results	Candidates
Georgia 1	R+9 (Note: A new congressional map was enacted in December 2023, after the most recent publication of the Cook PVI.)	Buddy Carter	Republican	2014	Incumbent re-elected.	▌ ✓ Buddy Carter (Republican) 62.0%; ▌Patti Hewitt (Democratic) 38.0%
Georgia 2	D+3	Sanford Bishop	Democratic	1992	Incumbent re-elected.	▌ ✓ Sanford Bishop (Democratic) 56.3%; ▌Wayne Johnson (Republican) 43.7%
Georgia 3	R+18	Drew Ferguson	Republican	2016	Incumbent retired. Republican hold.	▌ ✓ Brian Jack (Republican) 66.3%; ▌Maura Keller (Democratic) 33.7%
Georgia 4	D+27	Hank Johnson	Democratic	2006	Incumbent re-elected.	▌ ✓ Hank Johnson (Democratic) 75.6%; ▌Eugene Yu (Republican) 24.4%
Georgia 5	D+35	Nikema Williams	Democratic	2020	Incumbent re-elected.	▌ ✓ Nikema Williams (Democratic) 85.7%; ▌John Salvesen (Republican) 14.3%
Georgia 6	D+22	Lucy McBath; Redistricted from the 7th district	Democratic	2018	Incumbent re-elected.	▌ ✓ Lucy McBath (Democratic) 74.7%; ▌Jeff Criswell (Republican) 25.3%
Georgia 7	R+13	Rich McCormick; Redistricted from the 6th district	Republican	2022	Incumbent re-elected.	▌ ✓ Rich McCormick (Republican) 64.9%; ▌Bob Christian (Democratic) 35.1%
Georgia 8	R+16	Austin Scott	Republican	2010	Incumbent re-elected.	▌ ✓ Austin Scott (Republican) 68.9%; ▌Darrius Butler (Democratic) 31.1%
Georgia 9	R+20	Andrew Clyde	Republican	2020	Incumbent re-elected.	▌ ✓ Andrew Clyde (Republican) 69.0%; ▌Tambrei Cash (Democratic) 31.0%
Georgia 10	R+14	Mike Collins	Republican	2022	Incumbent re-elected.	▌ ✓ Mike Collins (Republican) 63.1%; ▌Lexy Doherty (Democratic) 36.9%
Georgia 11	R+14	Barry Loudermilk	Republican	2014	Incumbent re-elected.	▌ ✓ Barry Loudermilk (Republican) 67.3%; ▌Kate Stamper (Democratic) 32.7%
Georgia 12	R+8	Rick Allen	Republican	2014	Incumbent re-elected.	▌ ✓ Rick Allen (Republican) 60.3%; ▌Liz Johnson (Democratic) 39.7%
Georgia 13	D+17	David Scott	Democratic	2002	Incumbent re-elected.	▌ ✓ David Scott (Democratic) 71.8%; ▌Jonathan Chavez (Republican) 28.2%
Georgia 14	R+22	Marjorie Taylor Greene	Republican	2020	Incumbent re-elected.	▌ ✓ Marjorie Taylor Greene (Republican) 64.4%; ▌Shawn Harris (Democratic) 35.6%

== Hawaii ==
District		Incumbent			This race	
Location	PVI	Member	Party	First elected	Results	Candidates
Hawaii 1	D+14	Ed Case	Democratic	2002 (special); 2006 (retired); 2018	Incumbent re-elected.	▌ ✓ Ed Case (Democratic) 71.8%; ▌Patrick Largey (Republican) 28.2%
Hawaii 2	D+14	Jill Tokuda	Democratic	2022	Incumbent re-elected.	▌ ✓ Jill Tokuda (Democratic) 66.5%; ▌Steve Bond (Republican) 30.2%; Others: ▌Aaron Toman (Libertarian) 1.8%; ▌Randall Meyer (Independent) 1.6%

== Idaho ==
District		Incumbent			This race	
Location	PVI	Member	Party	First elected	Results	Candidates
Idaho 1	R+22	Russ Fulcher	Republican	2018	Incumbent re-elected.	▌ ✓ Russ Fulcher (Republican) 71.0%; ▌Kaylee Peterson (Democratic) 25.4%; ▌Matt Loesby (Libertarian) 2.1%; ▌Brendan Gomez (Constitution) 1.5%
Idaho 2	R+14	Mike Simpson	Republican	1998	Incumbent re-elected.	▌ ✓ Mike Simpson (Republican) 61.4%; ▌David Roth (Democratic) 31.0%; ▌Todd Corsetti (Libertarian) 5.2%; ▌Carta Sierra (Constitution) 2.4%

== Illinois ==
District		Incumbent			This race	
Location	PVI	Member	Party	First elected	Results	Candidates
Illinois 1	D+20	Jonathan Jackson	Democratic	2022	Incumbent re-elected.	▌ ✓ Jonathan Jackson (Democratic) 65.9%; ▌Marcus Lewis (Republican) 34.1%
Illinois 2	D+19	Robin Kelly	Democratic	2013 (special)	Incumbent re-elected.	▌ ✓ Robin Kelly (Democratic) 67.6%; ▌ Ashley Ramos (Republican) 32.4%
Illinois 3	D+20	Delia Ramirez	Democratic	2022	Incumbent re-elected.	▌ ✓ Delia Ramirez (Democratic) 67.3%; ▌John Booras (Republican) 32.7%
Illinois 4	D+22	Chuy García	Democratic	2018	Incumbent re-elected.	▌ ✓ Chuy García (Democratic) 67.5%; ▌Lupe Castillo (Republican) 27.3%; ▌Ed Harvey (Working Class) 5.2%
Illinois 5	D+18	Mike Quigley	Democratic	2009 (special)	Incumbent re-elected.	▌ ✓ Mike Quigley (Democratic) 69.0%; ▌Tommy Hanson (Republican) 31.0%
Illinois 6	D+3	Sean Casten	Democratic	2018	Incumbent re-elected.	▌ ✓ Sean Casten (Democratic) 54.2%; ▌Niki Conforti (Republican) 45.8%
Illinois 7	D+36	Danny Davis	Democratic	1996	Incumbent re-elected.	▌ ✓ Danny Davis (Democratic) 83.3%; ▌Chad Koppie (Republican) 16.7%
Illinois 8	D+6	Raja Krishnamoorthi	Democratic	2016	Incumbent re-elected.	▌ ✓ Raja Krishnamoorthi (Democratic) 57.1%; ▌Mark Rice (Republican) 42.9%
Illinois 9	D+19	Jan Schakowsky	Democratic	1998	Incumbent re-elected.	▌ ✓ Jan Schakowsky (Democratic) 68.4%; ▌Seth Cohen (Republican) 31.6%
Illinois 10	D+11	Brad Schneider	Democratic	2012; 2014 (lost); 2016	Incumbent re-elected.	▌ ✓ Brad Schneider (Democratic) 60.0%; ▌Jim Carris (Republican) 40.0%
Illinois 11	D+5	Bill Foster	Democratic	2008 (special); 2010 (lost); 2012	Incumbent re-elected.	▌ ✓ Bill Foster (Democratic) 55.6%; ▌Jerry Evans (Republican) 44.4%
Illinois 12	R+24	Mike Bost	Republican	2014	Incumbent re-elected.	▌ ✓ Mike Bost (Republican) 74.2%; ▌Brian Roberts (Democratic) 25.8%
Illinois 13	D+3	Nikki Budzinski	Democratic	2022	Incumbent re-elected.	▌ ✓ Nikki Budzinski (Democratic) 58.1%; ▌Joshua Loyd (Republican) 41.9%
Illinois 14	D+4	Lauren Underwood	Democratic	2018	Incumbent re-elected.	▌ ✓ Lauren Underwood (Democratic) 55.1%; ▌Jim Marter (Republican) 44.9%
Illinois 15	R+22	Mary Miller	Republican	2020	Incumbent re-elected.	▌ ✓ Mary Miller (Republican) 100%
Illinois 16	R+13	Darin LaHood	Republican	2015 (special)	Incumbent re-elected.	▌ ✓ Darin LaHood (Republican) 100%
Illinois 17	D+2	Eric Sorensen	Democratic	2022	Incumbent re-elected.	▌ ✓ Eric Sorensen (Democratic) 54.4%; ▌Joe McGraw (Republican) 45.6%

== Indiana ==
District		Incumbent			This race	
Location	PVI	Member	Party	First elected	Results	Candidates
Indiana 1	D+3	Frank J. Mrvan	Democratic	2020	Incumbent re-elected.	▌ ✓ Frank J. Mrvan (Democratic) 53.4%; ▌Randy Niemeyer (Republican) 44.9%; ▌Dakotah Miskus (Libertarian) 1.6%
Indiana 2	R+14	Rudy Yakym	Republican	2022 (special)	Incumbent re-elected.	▌ ✓ Rudy Yakym (Republican) 62.7%; ▌Lori Camp (Democratic) 34.6%; ▌William Henry (Libertarian) 2.6%
Indiana 3	R+18	Jim Banks	Republican	2016	Incumbent retired to run for U.S. Senate. Republican hold.	▌ ✓ Marlin Stutzman (Republican) 65.0%; ▌Kiley Adolph (Democratic) 31.4%; ▌Jarrad Lancaster (Libertarian) 3.5%
Indiana 4	R+18	Jim Baird	Republican	2018	Incumbent re-elected.	▌ ✓ Jim Baird (Republican) 64.8%; ▌Derrick Holder (Democratic) 30.9%; ▌Ashley Groff (Libertarian) 4.2%
Indiana 5	R+11	Victoria Spartz	Republican	2020	Incumbent re-elected.	▌ ✓ Victoria Spartz (Republican) 56.6%; ▌Deborah Pickett (Democratic) 38.0%; ▌Robert Slaughter (Independent) 2.7%; ▌Lauri Shillings (Libertarian) 2.7%
Indiana 6	R+19	Greg Pence	Republican	2018	Incumbent retired. Republican hold.	▌ ✓ Jefferson Shreve (Republican) 63.9%; ▌Cinde Wirth (Democratic) 31.7%; ▌James Sceniak (Libertarian) 4.4%
Indiana 7	D+19	André Carson	Democratic	2008 (special)	Incumbent re-elected.	▌ ✓ André Carson (Democratic) 68.3%; ▌John Schmitz (Republican) 29.0%; ▌Rusty Johnson (Libertarian) 2.7%
Indiana 8	R+19	Larry Bucshon	Republican	2010	Incumbent retired. Republican hold.	▌ ✓ Mark Messmer (Republican) 68.0%; ▌Erik Hurt (Democratic) 29.5%; ▌Richard Fitzlaff (Libertarian) 2.6%
Indiana 9	R+16	Erin Houchin	Republican	2022	Incumbent re-elected.	▌ ✓ Erin Houchin (Republican) 64.5%; ▌Tim Peck (Democratic) 32.8%; ▌Russell Brooksbank (Libertarian) 2.7%

== Iowa ==
District		Incumbent			This race	
Location	PVI	Member	Party	First elected	Results	Candidates
Iowa 1	R+3	Mariannette Miller-Meeks	Republican	2020	Incumbent re-elected.	▌ ✓ Mariannette Miller-Meeks (Republican) 50.1%; ▌Christina Bohannan (Democratic) 49.9%
Iowa 2	R+4	Ashley Hinson	Republican	2020	Incumbent re-elected.	▌ ✓ Ashley Hinson (Republican) 57.1%; ▌Sarah Corkery (Democratic) 41.6%; ▌Jody Puffet (Independent) 1.3%
Iowa 3	R+3	Zach Nunn	Republican	2022	Incumbent re-elected.	▌ ✓ Zach Nunn (Republican) 51.9%; ▌Lanon Baccam (Democratic) 48.1%
Iowa 4	R+16	Randy Feenstra	Republican	2020	Incumbent re-elected.	▌ ✓ Randy Feenstra (Republican) 67.2%; ▌Ryan Melton (Democratic) 32.8%

== Kansas ==
District		Incumbent			This race	
Location	PVI	Member	Party	First elected	Results	Candidates
Kansas 1	R+18	Tracey Mann	Republican	2020	Incumbent re-elected.	▌ ✓ Tracey Mann (Republican) 69.1%; ▌Paul Buskirk (Democratic) 30.9%
Kansas 2	R+11	Jake LaTurner	Republican	2020	Incumbent retired. Republican hold.	▌ ✓ Derek Schmidt (Republican) 57.1%; ▌Nancy Boyda (Democratic) 38.2%; ▌John Hauer (Libertarian) 4.7%
Kansas 3	R+1	Sharice Davids	Democratic	2018	Incumbent re-elected.	▌ ✓ Sharice Davids (Democratic) 53.4%; ▌Prasanth Reddy (Republican) 42.6%; ▌Steve Roberts (Libertarian) 4.0%
Kansas 4	R+14	Ron Estes	Republican	2017 (special)	Incumbent re-elected.	▌ ✓ Ron Estes (Republican) 65.0%; ▌Esau Freeman (Democratic) 35.0%

== Kentucky ==
District		Incumbent			This race	
Location	PVI	Member	Party	First elected	Results	Candidates
Kentucky 1	R+24	James Comer	Republican	2016 (special)	Incumbent re-elected.	▌ ✓ James Comer (Republican) 74.7%; ▌Erin Marshall (Democratic) 25.3%
Kentucky 2	R+21	Brett Guthrie	Republican	2008	Incumbent re-elected.	▌ ✓ Brett Guthrie (Republican) 73.1%; ▌Hank Linderman (Democratic) 26.9%
Kentucky 3	D+9	Morgan McGarvey	Democratic	2022	Incumbent re-elected.	▌ ✓ Morgan McGarvey (Democratic) 62.0%; ▌Mike Craven (Republican) 38.0%
Kentucky 4	R+19	Thomas Massie	Republican	2012 (special)	Incumbent re-elected.	▌ ✓ Thomas Massie (Republican) 100%
Kentucky 5	R+32	Hal Rogers	Republican	1980	Incumbent re-elected.	▌ ✓ Hal Rogers (Republican) 100%
Kentucky 6	R+9	Andy Barr	Republican	2012	Incumbent re-elected.	▌ ✓ Andy Barr (Republican) 63.4%; ▌Randy Cravens (Democratic) 36.6%

== Louisiana ==
District		Incumbent			This race	
Location	PVI	Member	Party	First elected	Results	Candidates
Louisiana 1	R+22 (Note: A new congressional map was enacted in January 2024 as a result of Robinson v. Ardoin, after the most recent publication of the Cook PVI.)	Steve Scalise	Republican	2008 (special)	Incumbent re-elected.	▌ ✓ Steve Scalise (Republican) 66.8%; ▌Mel Manuel (Democratic) 24.0%; ▌Randall Arrington (Republican) 5.0%; ▌Ross Shale (Republican) 2.3%; ▌Frankie Hyers (Independent) 1.9%
Louisiana 2	D+16	Troy Carter	Democratic	2021 (special)	Incumbent re-elected.	▌ ✓ Troy Carter (Democratic) 60.3%; ▌Christy Lynch (Republican) 13.6%; ▌Devin Graham (Republican) 12.8%; ▌Devin Davis (Democratic) 10.6%; ▌Shorell Perrilloux (Republican) 2.6%
Louisiana 3	R+22	Clay Higgins	Republican	2016	Incumbent re-elected.	▌ ✓ Clay Higgins (Republican) 70.6%; ▌Priscilla Gonzalez (Democratic) 18.7%; ▌Sadi Summerlin (Democratic) 6.7%; ▌Xan John (Republican) 4.1%
Louisiana 4	R+26	Mike Johnson	Republican	2016	Incumbent re-elected.	▌ ✓ Mike Johnson (Republican) 85.8%; ▌Joshua Morott (Republican) 14.2%
Louisiana 5	R+19	Julia Letlow	Republican	2021 (special)	Incumbent re-elected.	▌ ✓ Julia Letlow (Republican) 62.9%; ▌Michael Vallien Jr. (Democratic) 25.9%; ▌Vinny Mendoza (Republican) 11.2%
Louisiana 6	D+8	Garret Graves	Republican	2014	Incumbent retired. Democratic gain.	▌ ✓ Cleo Fields (Democratic) 50.8%; ▌Elbert Guillory (Republican) 37.7%; ▌Quentin Anderson (Democratic) 8.0%; ▌Peter Williams (Democratic) 2.1%; ▌Wilken Jones Jr. (Democratic) 1.3%

== Maine ==
District		Incumbent			This race	
Location	PVI	Member	Party	First elected	Results	Candidates
Maine 1	D+9	Chellie Pingree	Democratic	2008	Incumbent re-elected.	▌ ✓ Chellie Pingree (Democratic) 58.7%; ▌Ronald Russell (Republican) 36.4%; ▌Ethan Alcorne (Independent) 4.9%
Maine 2	R+6	Jared Golden	Democratic	2018	Incumbent re-elected.	▌ ✓ Jared Golden (Democratic) 50.3%; ▌Austin Theriault (Republican) 49.7%

== Maryland ==
District		Incumbent			This race	
Location	PVI	Member	Party	First elected	Results	Candidates
Maryland 1	R+11	Andy Harris	Republican	2010	Incumbent re-elected.	▌ ✓ Andy Harris (Republican) 59.4%; ▌Blane Miller (Democratic) 37.4%; ▌Joshua O'Brien (Libertarian) 3.1%
Maryland 2	D+7	Dutch Ruppersberger	Democratic	2002	Incumbent retired. Democratic hold.	▌ ✓ Johnny Olszewski (Democratic) 58.2%; ▌Kimberly Klacik (Republican) 39.5%; ▌Jasen Wunder (Libertarian) 2.1%
Maryland 3	D+10	John Sarbanes	Democratic	2006	Incumbent retired. Democratic hold.	▌ ✓ Sarah Elfreth (Democratic) 59.3%; ▌Robert Steinberger (Republican) 37.9%; ▌Miguel Barajas (Libertarian) 2.6%
Maryland 4	D+40	Glenn Ivey	Democratic	2022	Incumbent re-elected.	▌ ✓ Glenn Ivey (Democratic) 88.4%; ▌George McDermott (Republican) 11.2%
Maryland 5	D+15	Steny Hoyer	Democratic	1981 (special)	Incumbent re-elected.	▌ ✓ Steny Hoyer (Democratic) 67.8%; ▌Michelle Talkington (Republican) 32.0%
Maryland 6	D+2	David Trone	Democratic	2018	Incumbent retired to run for U.S. Senate. New member elected. Democratic hold.	▌ ✓ April McClain Delaney (Democratic) 53.1%; ▌Neil Parrott (Republican) 46.7%
Maryland 7	D+30	Kweisi Mfume	Democratic	1986; 1996 (resigned); 2020 (special)	Incumbent re-elected.	▌ ✓ Kweisi Mfume (Democratic) 80.3%; ▌Scott Collier (Republican) 17.2%; ▌Ronald Owens-Bey (Libertarian) 2.4%
Maryland 8	D+29	Jamie Raskin	Democratic	2016	Incumbent re-elected.	▌ ✓ Jamie Raskin (Democratic) 76.8%; ▌Cheryl Riley (Republican) 20.5%; ▌Nancy Wallace (Green) 2.5%

== Massachusetts ==
District		Incumbent			This race	
Location	PVI	Member	Party	First elected	Results	Candidates
Massachusetts 1	D+9	Richard Neal	Democratic	1988	Incumbent re-elected.	▌ ✓ Richard Neal (Democratic) 62.6%; ▌Nadia Milleron (Independent) 37.4%
Massachusetts 2	D+13	Jim McGovern	Democratic	1996	Incumbent re-elected.	▌ ✓ Jim McGovern (Democratic) 68.8%; ▌Cornelius Shea (Independent) 31.2%
Massachusetts 3	D+11	Lori Trahan	Democratic	2018	Incumbent re-elected.	▌ ✓ Lori Trahan (Democratic) 100%
Massachusetts 4	D+12	Jake Auchincloss	Democratic	2020	Incumbent re-elected.	▌ ✓ Jake Auchincloss (Democratic) 100%
Massachusetts 5	D+23	Katherine Clark	Democratic	2013 (special)	Incumbent re-elected.	▌ ✓ Katherine Clark (Democratic) 100%
Massachusetts 6	D+11	Seth Moulton	Democratic	2014	Incumbent re-elected.	▌ ✓ Seth Moulton (Democratic) 100%
Massachusetts 7	D+35	Ayanna Pressley	Democratic	2018	Incumbent re-elected.	▌ ✓ Ayanna Pressley (Democratic) 100%
Massachusetts 8	D+15	Stephen Lynch	Democratic	2001 (special)	Incumbent re-elected.	▌ ✓ Stephen Lynch (Democratic) 70.5%; ▌Robert Burke (Republican) 29.5%
Massachusetts 9	D+6	Bill Keating	Democratic	2010	Incumbent re-elected.	▌ ✓ Bill Keating (Democratic) 56.5%; ▌Dan Sullivan (Republican) 43.5%

== Michigan ==
District		Incumbent			This race	
Location	PVI	Member	Party	First elected	Results	Candidates
Michigan 1	R+13	Jack Bergman	Republican	2016	Incumbent re-elected.	▌ ✓ Jack Bergman (Republican) 59.1%; ▌Callie Barr (Democratic) 37.9%; Others: ▌Liz Hakola (Working Class) 1.8%; ▌Andrew Gale (Libertarian) 1.1%
Michigan 2	R+16	John Moolenaar	Republican	2014	Incumbent re-elected.	▌ ✓ John Moolenaar (Republican) 65.1%; ▌Michael Lynch (Democratic) 31.7%; Others: ▌Ben DeJong (Libertarian) 1.6%; ▌Scott Adams (US Taxpayers) 1.5%
Michigan 3	D+1	Hillary Scholten	Democratic	2022	Incumbent re-elected.	▌ ✓ Hillary Scholten (Democratic) 53.7%; ▌Paul Hudson (Republican) 43.8%; Others: ▌Louis Palus (Working Class) 1.3%; ▌Alex Avery (Libertarian) 1.3%
Michigan 4	R+5	Bill Huizenga	Republican	2010	Incumbent re-elected.	▌ ✓ Bill Huizenga (Republican) 55.1%; ▌Jessica Swartz (Democratic) 43.4%; ▌Clark Curtis (US Taxpayers) 1.6%
Michigan 5	R+15	Tim Walberg	Republican	2006; 2008 (lost); 2010	Incumbent re-elected.	▌ ✓ Tim Walberg (Republican) 65.7%; ▌Libbi Urban (Democratic) 32.8%; ▌James Bronke (Green) 1.6%
Michigan 6	D+11	Debbie Dingell	Democratic	2014	Incumbent re-elected.	▌ ✓ Debbie Dingell (Democratic) 62.0%; ▌Heather Smiley (Republican) 35.0%; Others: ▌Clyde Shabazz (Green) 1.8%; ▌Bill Krebaum (Libertarian) 1.2%
Michigan 7	R+2	Elissa Slotkin	Democratic	2018	Incumbent retired to run for U.S. Senate. Republican gain.	▌ ✓ Tom Barrett (Republican) 50.3%; ▌Curtis Hertel Jr. (Democratic) 46.6%; ▌Rachel Dailey (Libertarian) 3.2%
Michigan 8	R+1	Dan Kildee	Democratic	2012	Incumbent retired. Democratic hold.	▌ ✓ Kristen McDonald Rivet (Democratic) 51.2%; ▌Paul Junge (Republican) 44.6%; Others: ▌Kathy Goodwin (Working Class) 2.0%; ▌Steve Barcelo (Libertarian) 1.1%; ▌James Little (US Taxpayers) 0.6%; ▌Jim Casha (Green) 0.4%
Michigan 9	R+18	Lisa McClain	Republican	2020	Incumbent re-elected.	▌ ✓ Lisa McClain (Republican) 66.8%; ▌Clinton St. Mosley (Democratic) 29.5%; ▌Jim Walkowicz (Working Class) 2.6%; ▌Kevin Vayko (Libertarian) 1.1%
Michigan 10	R+3	John James	Republican	2022	Incumbent re-elected.	▌ ✓ John James (Republican) 51.1%; ▌Carl Marlinga (Democratic) 45.0%; ▌Liz Hakola (Working Class) 2.6%; ▌Mike Salibo (Libertarian) 1.3%
Michigan 11	D+7	Haley Stevens	Democratic	2018	Incumbent re-elected.	▌ ✓ Haley Stevens (Democratic) 58.2%; ▌Nick Somberg (Republican) 39.6%; ▌Douglas Campbell (Green) 2.2%
Michigan 12	D+23	Rashida Tlaib	Democratic	2018	Incumbent re-elected.	▌ ✓ Rashida Tlaib (Democratic) 69.7%; ▌James Hooper (Republican) 25.4%; ▌Gary Walkowicz (Working Class) 2.6%; ▌Brenda Sanders (Green) 2.3%
Michigan 13	D+23	Shri Thanedar	Democratic	2022	Incumbent re-elected.	▌ ✓ Shri Thanedar (Democratic) 68.6%; ▌Martell Bivings (Republican) 24.5%; ▌Simone Coleman (Working Class) 4.2%; Others: ▌Chris Clark (Libertarian) 1.8%; ▌Chris Dardzinski (US Taxpayers) 0.9%

== Minnesota ==
District		Incumbent			This race	
Location	PVI	Member	Party	First elected	Results	Candidates
Minnesota 1	R+7	Brad Finstad	Republican	2022 (special)	Incumbent re-elected.	▌ ✓ Brad Finstad (Republican) 58.5%; ▌Rachel Bohman (DFL) 41.5%
Minnesota 2	D+1	Angie Craig	DFL	2018	Incumbent re-elected.	▌ ✓ Angie Craig (DFL) 55.6%; ▌Joe Teirab (Republican) 42.1%; ▌Thomas Bowman (Independent) 2.3%
Minnesota 3	D+8	Dean Phillips	DFL	2018	Incumbent retired to run for president. DFL hold.	▌ ✓ Kelly Morrison (DFL) 58.5%; ▌Tad Jude (Republican) 41.5%
Minnesota 4	D+17	Betty McCollum	DFL	2000	Incumbent re-elected.	▌ ✓ Betty McCollum (DFL) 67.4%; ▌May Lor Xiong (Republican) 32.6%
Minnesota 5	D+30	Ilhan Omar	DFL	2018	Incumbent re-elected.	▌ ✓ Ilhan Omar (DFL) 75.2%; ▌Dalia al-Aqidi (Republican) 24.8%
Minnesota 6	R+12	Tom Emmer	Republican	2014	Incumbent re-elected.	▌ ✓ Tom Emmer (Republican) 62.5%; ▌Jeanne Hendricks (DFL) 37.5%
Minnesota 7	R+19	Michelle Fischbach	Republican	2020	Incumbent re-elected.	▌ ✓ Michelle Fischbach (Republican) 70.5%; ▌A. J. Peters (DFL) 29.5%
Minnesota 8	R+8	Pete Stauber	Republican	2018	Incumbent re-elected.	▌ ✓ Pete Stauber (Republican) 58.0%; ▌Jennifer Schultz (DFL) 42.0%

== Mississippi ==
District		Incumbent			This race	
Location	PVI	Member	Party	First elected	Results	Candidates
Mississippi 1	R+18	Trent Kelly	Republican	2015 (special)	Incumbent re-elected.	▌ ✓ Trent Kelly (Republican) 69.8%; ▌Dianne Black (Democratic) 30.2%
Mississippi 2	D+11	Bennie Thompson	Democratic	1993 (special)	Incumbent re-elected.	▌ ✓ Bennie Thompson (Democratic) 62.0%; ▌Ron Eller (Republican) 38.0%
Mississippi 3	R+15	Michael Guest	Republican	2018	Incumbent re-elected.	▌ ✓ Michael Guest (Republican) 100%
Mississippi 4	R+22	Mike Ezell	Republican	2022	Incumbent re-elected.	▌ ✓ Mike Ezell (Republican) 74.0%; ▌Craig Raybon (Democratic) 26.1%

== Missouri ==
District		Incumbent			This race	
Location	PVI	Member	Party	First elected	Results	Candidates
Missouri 1	D+27	Cori Bush	Democratic	2020	Incumbent lost renomination. Democratic hold.	▌ ✓ Wesley Bell (Democratic) 75.9%; ▌Andrew Jones (Republican) 18.4%; ▌Rochelle Riggins (Libertarian) 3.3%; Others: ▌Don Fitz (Green) 1.7%; ▌Blake Ashby (Better Party) 0.7%
Missouri 2	R+7	Ann Wagner	Republican	2012	Incumbent re-elected.	▌ ✓ Ann Wagner (Republican) 54.5%; ▌Ray Hartmann (Democratic) 42.5%; ▌Brandon Daugherty (Libertarian) 2.1%; ▌Shelby Davis (Green) 0.9%
Missouri 3	R+16	Blaine Luetkemeyer	Republican	2008	Incumbent retired. Republican hold.	▌ ✓ Bob Onder (Republican) 61.3%; ▌Bethany Mann (Democratic) 35.3%; ▌Jordan Rowden (Libertarian) 2.4%; ▌William Hastings (Green) 1.0%
Missouri 4	R+23	Mark Alford	Republican	2022	Incumbent re-elected.	▌ ✓ Mark Alford (Republican) 71.1%; ▌Jeanette Cass (Democratic) 26.4%; ▌Thomas Holbrook (Libertarian) 2.5%
Missouri 5	D+11	Emanuel Cleaver	Democratic	2004	Incumbent re-elected.	▌ ✓ Emanuel Cleaver (Democratic) 60.2%; ▌Sean Smith (Republican) 36.4%; Others: ▌Bill Wayne (Libertarian) 2.0%; ▌Michael Day (Green) 1.3%
Missouri 6	R+21	Sam Graves	Republican	2000	Incumbent re-elected.	▌ ✓ Sam Graves (Republican) 70.7%; ▌Pam May (Democratic) 26.9%; Others: ▌Andy Maidment (Libertarian) 1.6%; ▌Mike Diel (Green) 0.8%
Missouri 7	R+24	Eric Burlison	Republican	2022	Incumbent re-elected.	▌ ✓ Eric Burlison (Republican) 71.6%; ▌Missi Hesketh (Democratic) 26.3%; ▌Kevin Craig (Libertarian) 2.2%
Missouri 8	R+28	Jason Smith	Republican	2013 (special)	Incumbent re-elected.	▌ ✓ Jason Smith (Republican) 76.2%; ▌Randi McCallian (Democratic) 21.8%; ▌Jake Dawson (Libertarian) 2.0%

== Montana ==
District		Incumbent			This race	
Location	PVI	Member	Party	First elected	Results	Candidates
Montana 1	R+6	Ryan Zinke	Republican	2014; 2017 (resigned); 2022	Incumbent re-elected.	▌ ✓ Ryan Zinke (Republican) 52.3%; ▌Monica Tranel (Democratic) 44.6%; ▌Dennis Hayes (Libertarian) 3.1%
Montana 2	R+16	Matt Rosendale	Republican	2020	Incumbent retired. Republican hold.	▌ ✓ Troy Downing (Republican) 66.0%; ▌John Driscoll (Democratic) 34.0%

== Nebraska ==
District		Incumbent			This race	
Location	PVI	Member	Party	First elected	Results	Candidates
Nebraska 1	R+9	Mike Flood	Republican	2022 (special)	Incumbent re-elected.	▌ ✓ Mike Flood (Republican) 60.1%; ▌Carol Blood (Democratic) 39.9%
Nebraska 2	EVEN	Don Bacon	Republican	2016	Incumbent re-elected.	▌ ✓ Don Bacon (Republican) 50.9%; ▌Tony Vargas (Democratic) 49.1%
Nebraska 3	R+29	Adrian Smith	Republican	2006	Incumbent re-elected.	▌ ✓ Adrian Smith (Republican) 80.4%; ▌Daniel Ebers (Democratic) 19.6%

== Nevada ==
District		Incumbent			This race	
Location	PVI	Member	Party	First elected	Results	Candidates
Nevada 1	D+3	Dina Titus	Democratic	2008; 2010 (lost); 2012	Incumbent re-elected.	▌ ✓ Dina Titus (Democratic) 52.0%; ▌Mark Robertson (Republican) 44.5%; Others: ▌Ron Quince (Independent) 1.0%; ▌William Hoge (IAPN) 0.8%; ▌David Havlicek (Libertarian) 0.8%; ▌David Goossen (Independent) 0.8%
Nevada 2	R+8	Mark Amodei	Republican	2011 (special)	Incumbent re-elected.	▌ ✓ Mark Amodei (Republican) 55.0%; ▌Robert Kidd (Independent) 36.0%; ▌Lynn Chapman (IAPN) 5.0%; ▌Javi Tachiquin (Libertarian) 4.0%
Nevada 3	D+1	Susie Lee	Democratic	2018	Incumbent re-elected.	▌ ✓ Susie Lee (Democratic) 51.4%; ▌Drew Johnson (Republican) 48.6%
Nevada 4	D+3	Steven Horsford	Democratic	2012; 2014 (lost); 2018	Incumbent re-elected.	▌ ✓ Steven Horsford (Democratic) 52.7%; ▌John Lee (Republican) 44.6%; Others: ▌Russell Best (IAPN) 1.5%; ▌Timothy Ferreira (Libertarian) 1.3%

== New Hampshire ==
District		Incumbent			This race	
Location	PVI	Member	Party	First elected	Results	Candidates
New Hampshire 1	EVEN	Chris Pappas	Democratic	2018	Incumbent re-elected.	▌ ✓ Chris Pappas (Democratic) 54.0%; ▌Russell Prescott (Republican) 46.0%
New Hampshire 2	D+2	Annie Kuster	Democratic	2012	Incumbent retired. Democratic hold.	▌ ✓ Maggie Goodlander (Democratic) 53.0%; ▌Lily Tang Williams (Republican) 47.0%

== New Jersey ==
District		Incumbent			This race	
Location	PVI	Member	Party	First elected	Results	Candidates
New Jersey 1	D+10	Donald Norcross	Democratic	2014 (special)	Incumbent re-elected.	▌ ✓ Donald Norcross (Democratic) 57.8%; ▌Teddy Liddell (Republican) 40.0%; Others: ▌Robin Brownfield (Green) 1.6%; ▌Austin Johnson (Independent) 0.6%
New Jersey 2	R+5	Jeff Van Drew	Republican	2018 (Note: Van Drew was first elected as a Democrat but switched to the Republican Party in December 2019.)	Incumbent re-elected.	▌ ✓ Jeff Van Drew (Republican) 58.1%; ▌Joe Salerno (Democratic) 41.2%; ▌Thomas Cannavo (Green) 0.7%
New Jersey 3	D+5	Andy Kim	Democratic	2018	Incumbent retired to run for U.S. Senate. Democratic hold.	▌ ✓ Herb Conaway (Democratic) 53.2%; ▌Rajesh Mohan (Republican) 44.6%; Others: ▌Steven Welzer (Green) 0.9%; ▌Chris Russomanno (Libertarian) 0.5%; ▌Douglas Wynn (Independent) 0.3%; ▌John Barbera (Independent) 0.3%
New Jersey 4	R+14	Chris Smith	Republican	1980	Incumbent re-elected.	▌ ✓ Chris Smith (Republican) 67.4%; ▌Matthew Jenkins (Democratic) 31.7%; Others: ▌John Morrison (Libertarian) 0.5%; ▌Barry Bendar (Green) 0.5%
New Jersey 5	D+4	Josh Gottheimer	Democratic	2016	Incumbent re-elected.	▌ ✓ Josh Gottheimer (Democratic) 54.6%; ▌Mary Jo Guinchard (Republican) 43.3%; Others: ▌Beau Forte (Green) 0.9%; ▌James Tosone (Libertarian) 0.6%; ▌Aamir Arif (Independent) 0.6%
New Jersey 6	D+8	Frank Pallone	Democratic	1988 (special)	Incumbent re-elected.	▌ ✓ Frank Pallone (Democratic) 56.1%; ▌Scott Fegler (Republican) 40.3%; Others: ▌Fahad Akhtar (Independent) 1.6%; ▌Herb Tarbous (Green) 1.4%; ▌Matthew Amitrano (Libertarian) 0.6%
New Jersey 7	R+1	Thomas Kean Jr.	Republican	2022	Incumbent re-elected.	▌ ✓ Tom Kean Jr. (Republican) 51.8%; ▌Sue Altman (Democratic) 46.4%; Others: ▌Andrew Black (Green) 1.0%; ▌Lana Leguia (Libertarian) 0.9%
New Jersey 8	D+22	Rob Menendez	Democratic	2022	Incumbent re-elected.	▌ ✓ Rob Menendez (Democratic) 59.4%; ▌Anthony Valdes (Republican) 34.6%; ▌Christian Robbins (Green) 2.8%; Others: ▌Pablo Olivera (Labor) 2.2%; ▌Lea Sherman (Socialist Workers) 1.2%
New Jersey 9	D+8	Vacant			Rep. Bill Pascrell (D) died August 21, 2024. Democratic hold.	▌ ✓ Nellie Pou (Democratic) 50.8%; ▌Billy Prempeh (Republican) 45.9%; Others: ▌Benjamin Taylor (Green) 2.0%; ▌Bruno Pereira (Libertarian) 1.4%
New Jersey 10	D+30	LaMonica McIver	Democratic	2024 (special)	Incumbent re-elected.	▌ ✓ LaMonica McIver (Democratic) 74.4%; ▌Carmen Bucco (Republican) 22.2%; Others: ▌Jose Serrano (Green) 1.3%; ▌Cynthia Johnson (Independent) 0.9%; ▌Michelle Middleton (Independent) 0.7%; ▌Donna Weiss (Independent) 0.5%
New Jersey 11	D+6	Mikie Sherrill	Democratic	2018	Incumbent re-elected.	▌ ✓ Mikie Sherrill (Democratic) 56.5%; ▌Joseph Belnome (Republican) 41.2%; Others: ▌Lily Benavides (Green) 1.2%; ▌Joshua Lanzara (Independent) 0.5%
New Jersey 12	D+12	Bonnie Watson Coleman	Democratic	2014	Incumbent re-elected.	▌ ✓ Bonnie Watson Coleman (Democratic) 61.2%; ▌Darius Mayfield (Republican) 36.4%; Others: ▌Kim Meudt (Green) 1.4%; ▌Vic Kaplan (Libertarian) 0.9%

== New Mexico ==
District		Incumbent			This race	
Location	PVI	Member	Party	First elected	Results	Candidates
New Mexico 1	D+5	Melanie Stansbury	Democratic	2021 (special)	Incumbent re-elected.	▌ ✓ Melanie Stansbury (Democratic) 56.4%; ▌Steve Jones (Republican) 43.6%
New Mexico 2	D+1	Gabe Vasquez	Democratic	2022	Incumbent re-elected.	▌ ✓ Gabe Vasquez (Democratic) 52.1%; ▌Yvette Herrell (Republican) 47.9%
New Mexico 3	D+4	Teresa Leger Fernandez	Democratic	2020	Incumbent re-elected.	▌ ✓ Teresa Leger Fernandez (Democratic) 56.3%; ▌Sharon Clahchischilliage (Republican) 43.7%

== New York ==
District		Incumbent			This race	
Location	PVI	Member	Party	First elected	Results	Candidates
New York 1	R+4 (Note: A new congressional map was enacted in February 2024, after the most recent publication of the Cook PVI.)	Nick LaLota	Republican	2022	Incumbent re-elected.	▌ ✓ Nick LaLota (Republican) 55.2%; ▌John Avlon (Democratic) 44.8%
New York 2	R+4	Andrew Garbarino	Republican	2020	Incumbent re-elected.	▌ ✓ Andrew Garbarino (Republican) 59.2%; ▌Rob Lubin (Democratic) 40.8%
New York 3	D+3	Tom Suozzi	Democratic	2016; 2022 (retired); 2024 (special)	Incumbent re-elected.	▌ ✓ Tom Suozzi (Democratic) 51.8%; ▌Michael LiPetri (Republican) 48.2%
New York 4	D+5	Anthony D'Esposito	Republican	2022	Incumbent lost re-election. Democratic gain.	▌ ✓ Laura Gillen (Democratic) 51.1%; ▌Anthony D'Esposito (Republican) 48.9%
New York 5	D+30	Gregory Meeks	Democratic	1998 (special)	Incumbent re-elected.	▌ ✓ Gregory Meeks (Democratic) 72.9%; ▌Paul King (Republican) 27.1%
New York 6	D+14	Grace Meng	Democratic	2012	Incumbent re-elected.	▌ ✓ Grace Meng (Democratic) 60.7%; ▌Thomas Zmich (Republican) 37.6%; ▌Joseph Chou (Truth) 1.6%
New York 7	D+30	Nydia Velázquez	Democratic	1992	Incumbent re-elected.	▌ ✓ Nydia Velázquez (Democratic) 78.1%; ▌William Kregler (Republican) 21.9%
New York 8	D+27	Hakeem Jeffries	Democratic	2012	Incumbent re-elected.	▌ ✓ Hakeem Jeffries (Democratic) 75.4%; ▌John Delaney (Republican) 24.6%
New York 9	D+25	Yvette Clarke	Democratic	2006	Incumbent re-elected.	▌ ✓ Yvette Clarke (Democratic) 74.3%; ▌Menachem Raitport (Republican) 25.7%
New York 10	D+34	Dan Goldman	Democratic	2022	Incumbent re-elected.	▌ ✓ Dan Goldman (Democratic) 82.5%; ▌Alex Dodenhoff (Republican) 15.0%; ▌Paul Briscoe (Conservative) 2.7%
New York 11	R+6	Nicole Malliotakis	Republican	2020	Incumbent re-elected.	▌ ✓ Nicole Malliotakis (Republican) 64.1%; ▌Andrea Morse (Democratic) 35.9%
New York 12	D+34	Jerry Nadler	Democratic	1992 (special)	Incumbent re-elected.	▌ ✓ Jerry Nadler (Democratic) 80.5%; ▌Michael Zumbluskas (Republican) 19.5%
New York 13	D+38	Adriano Espaillat	Democratic	2016	Incumbent re-elected.	▌ ✓ Adriano Espaillat (Democratic) 83.5%; ▌Ruben Vargas (Republican) 16.5%
New York 14	D+27	Alexandria Ocasio-Cortez	Democratic	2018	Incumbent re-elected.	▌ ✓ Alexandria Ocasio-Cortez (Democratic) 69.2%; ▌Tina Forte (Republican) 30.8%
New York 15	D+35	Ritchie Torres	Democratic	2020	Incumbent re-elected.	▌ ✓ Ritchie Torres (Democratic) 76.5%; ▌Gonzalo Duran (Republican) 21.4%; ▌Jose Vega (LaRouche) 2.4%
New York 16	D+21	Jamaal Bowman	Democratic	2020	Incumbent lost renomination. Democratic hold.	▌ ✓ George Latimer (Democratic) 71.6%; ▌Miriam Levitt Flisser (Republican) 28.4%
New York 17	D+3	Mike Lawler	Republican	2022	Incumbent re-elected.	▌ ✓ Mike Lawler (Republican) 52.2%; ▌Mondaire Jones (Democratic) 45.8%; ▌Anthony Frascone (Working Families) 2.0%
New York 18	D+2	Pat Ryan	Democratic	2022 (special)	Incumbent re-elected.	▌ ✓ Pat Ryan (Democratic) 57.2%; ▌Alison Esposito (Republican) 42.8%
New York 19	R+1	Marc Molinaro	Republican	2022	Incumbent lost re-election. Democratic gain.	▌ ✓ Josh Riley (Democratic) 51.1%; ▌Marc Molinaro (Republican) 48.9%
New York 20	D+7	Paul Tonko	Democratic	2008	Incumbent re-elected.	▌ ✓ Paul Tonko (Democratic) 61.1%; ▌Kevin Waltz (Republican) 38.9%
New York 21	R+10	Elise Stefanik	Republican	2014	Incumbent re-elected.	▌ ✓ Elise Stefanik (Republican) 62.0%; ▌Paula Collins (Democratic) 38.0%
New York 22	D+3	Brandon Williams	Republican	2022	Incumbent lost re-election. Democratic gain.	▌ ✓ John Mannion (Democratic) 54.6%; ▌Brandon Williams (Republican) 45.4%
New York 23	R+12	Nick Langworthy	Republican	2022	Incumbent re-elected.	▌ ✓ Nick Langworthy (Republican) 65.8%; ▌Thomas Carle (Democratic) 34.2%
New York 24	R+13	Claudia Tenney	Republican	2016; 2018 (lost); 2020	Incumbent re-elected.	▌ ✓ Claudia Tenney (Republican) 65.7%; ▌David Wagenhauser (Democratic) 34.3%
New York 25	D+8	Joseph Morelle	Democratic	2018 (special)	Incumbent re-elected.	▌ ✓ Joseph Morelle (Democratic) 60.8%; ▌Gregg Sadwick (Republican) 39.2%
New York 26	D+10	Tim Kennedy	Democratic	2024 (special)	Incumbent re-elected.	▌ ✓ Tim Kennedy (Democratic) 65.2%; ▌Anthony Marecki (Republican) 34.8%

== North Carolina ==
District		Incumbent			This race	
Location	PVI	Member	Party	First elected	Results	Candidates
North Carolina 1	R+1 (Note: A new congressional map was enacted in October 2023, after the most recent publication of the Cook PVI.)	Don Davis	Democratic	2022	Incumbent re-elected.	▌ ✓ Don Davis (Democratic) 49.5%; ▌Laurie Buckhout (Republican) 47.8%; ▌Tom Bailey (Libertarian) 2.6%
North Carolina 2	D+15	Deborah Ross	Democratic	2020	Incumbent re-elected.	▌ ✓ Deborah Ross (Democratic) 66.3%; ▌Alan Swain (Republican) 31.6%; ▌Michael Dublin (Green) 2.1%
North Carolina 3	R+11	Greg Murphy	Republican	2019 (special)	Incumbent re-elected.	▌ ✓ Greg Murphy (Republican) 77.4%; ▌Gheorghe Cormos (Libertarian) 22.6%
North Carolina 4	D+21	Valerie Foushee	Democratic	2022	Incumbent re-elected.	▌ ✓ Valerie Foushee (Democratic) 71.8%; ▌Eric Blankenburg (Republican) 26.1%; ▌Guy Meilleur (Libertarian) 2.0%
North Carolina 5	R+10	Virginia Foxx	Republican	2004	Incumbent re-elected.	▌ ✓ Virginia Foxx (Republican) 59.5%; ▌Chuck Hubbard (Democratic) 40.5%
North Carolina 5	R+10	Kathy Manning; Redistricted from the 6th district	Democratic	2020	Incumbent retired. Democratic loss.	▌ ✓ Virginia Foxx (Republican) 59.5%; ▌Chuck Hubbard (Democratic) 40.5%
North Carolina 6	R+11	None (new seat)			New member elected. Republican gain.	▌ ✓ Addison McDowell (Republican) 69.2%; ▌Kevin Hayes (Constitution) 30.8%
North Carolina 7	R+8	David Rouzer	Republican	2014	Incumbent re-elected.	▌ ✓ David Rouzer (Republican) 58.6%; ▌Marlando Pridgen (Democratic) 41.4%
North Carolina 8	R+11	Dan Bishop	Republican	2019 (special)	Incumbent retired to run for attorney general. Republican hold.	▌ ✓ Mark Harris (Republican) 59.6%; ▌Justin Dues (Democratic) 40.4%
North Carolina 9	R+9	Richard Hudson	Republican	2012	Incumbent re-elected.	▌ ✓ Richard Hudson (Republican) 56.3%; ▌Nigel Bristow (Democratic) 37.8%; ▌Shelane Etchison (Independent) 5.9%
North Carolina 10	R+10	Patrick McHenry	Republican	2004	Incumbent retired. Republican hold.	▌ ✓ Pat Harrigan (Republican) 57.5%; ▌Ralph Scott Jr. (Democratic) 38.2%; ▌Steven Feldman (Libertarian) 2.9%; ▌Todd Helm (Constitution) 1.4%
North Carolina 11	R+8	Chuck Edwards	Republican	2022	Incumbent re-elected.	▌ ✓ Chuck Edwards (Republican) 56.8%; ▌Caleb Rudow (Democratic) 43.2%
North Carolina 12	D+23	Alma Adams	Democratic	2014 (special)	Incumbent re-elected.	▌ ✓ Alma Adams (Democratic) 74.0%; ▌Addul Ali (Republican) 26.0%
North Carolina 13	R+11	Wiley Nickel	Democratic	2022	Incumbent retired. Republican gain.	▌ ✓ Brad Knott (Republican) 58.6%; ▌Frank Pierce (Democratic) 41.4%
North Carolina 14	R+11	Jeff Jackson	Democratic	2022	Incumbent retired to run for attorney general. Republican gain.	▌ ✓ Tim Moore (Republican) 58.1%; ▌Pam Genant (Democratic) 41.9%

== North Dakota ==
District		Incumbent			This race	
Location	PVI	Member	Party	First elected	Results	Candidates
North Dakota at-large	R+20	Kelly Armstrong	Republican	2018	Incumbent retired to run for governor. Republican hold.	▌ ✓ Julie Fedorchak (Republican) 69.5%; ▌Trygve Hammer (Democratic-NPL) 30.5%

== Ohio ==
District		Incumbent			This race	
Location	PVI	Member	Party	First elected	Results	Candidates
Ohio 1	D+2	Greg Landsman	Democratic	2022	Incumbent re-elected.	▌ ✓ Greg Landsman (Democratic) 54.6%; ▌Orlando Sonza (Republican) 45.4%
Ohio 2	R+25	Brad Wenstrup	Republican	2012	Incumbent retired. Republican hold.	▌ ✓ David Taylor (Republican) 73.6%; ▌Samantha Meadows (Democratic) 26.4%
Ohio 3	D+20	Joyce Beatty	Democratic	2012	Incumbent re-elected.	▌ ✓ Joyce Beatty (Democratic) 70.7%; ▌Michael Young (Republican) 29.3%
Ohio 4	R+20	Jim Jordan	Republican	2006	Incumbent re-elected.	▌ ✓ Jim Jordan (Republican) 68.5%; ▌Tamie Wilson (Democratic) 31.5%
Ohio 5	R+15	Bob Latta	Republican	2007 (special)	Incumbent re-elected.	▌ ✓ Bob Latta (Republican) 67.5%; ▌Keith Mundy (Democratic) 32.5%
Ohio 6	R+16	Michael Rulli	Republican	2024 (special)	Incumbent re-elected.	▌ ✓ Michael Rulli (Republican) 66.7%; ▌Michael Kripchak (Democratic) 33.3%
Ohio 7	R+7	Max Miller	Republican	2022	Incumbent re-elected.	▌ ✓ Max Miller (Republican) 51.1%; ▌Matt Diemer (Democratic) 36.1%; ▌Dennis Kucinich (Independent) 12.8%
Ohio 8	R+14	Warren Davidson	Republican	2016 (special)	Incumbent re-elected.	▌ ✓ Warren Davidson (Republican) 62.8%; ▌Vanessa Enoch (Democratic) 37.2%
Ohio 9	R+3	Marcy Kaptur	Democratic	1982	Incumbent re-elected.	▌ ✓ Marcy Kaptur (Democratic) 48.3%; ▌Derek Merrin (Republican) 47.6%; ▌Tom Pruss (Libertarian) 4.1%
Ohio 10	R+4	Mike Turner	Republican	2002	Incumbent re-elected.	▌ ✓ Mike Turner (Republican) 57.6%; ▌Amy Cox (Democratic) 39.2%; ▌Michael Harbaugh (Independent) 3.1%
Ohio 11	D+28	Shontel Brown	Democratic	2021 (special)	Incumbent re-elected.	▌ ✓ Shontel Brown (Democratic) 78.3%; ▌Alan Rapoport (Republican) 19.6%; ▌Sean Freeman (Independent) 2.0%
Ohio 12	R+18	Troy Balderson	Republican	2018 (special)	Incumbent re-elected.	▌ ✓ Troy Balderson (Republican) 68.5%; ▌Jerrad Christian (Democratic) 31.5%
Ohio 13	R+1	Emilia Sykes	Democratic	2022	Incumbent re-elected.	▌ ✓ Emilia Sykes (Democratic) 51.1%; ▌Kevin Coughlin (Republican) 48.9%
Ohio 14	R+9	David Joyce	Republican	2012	Incumbent re-elected.	▌ ✓ David Joyce (Republican) 63.4%; ▌Brian Kenderes (Democratic) 36.6%
Ohio 15	R+6	Mike Carey	Republican	2021 (special)	Incumbent re-elected.	▌ ✓ Mike Carey (Republican) 56.5%; ▌Adam Miller (Democratic) 43.5%

== Oklahoma ==
District		Incumbent			This race	
Location	PVI	Member	Party	First elected	Results	Candidates
Oklahoma 1	R+14	Kevin Hern	Republican	2018	Incumbent re-elected.	▌ ✓ Kevin Hern (Republican) 60.4%; ▌Dennis Baker (Democratic) 34.5%; ▌Mark Sanders (Independent) 5.0%
Oklahoma 2	R+29	Josh Brecheen	Republican	2022	Incumbent re-elected.	▌ ✓ Josh Brecheen (Republican) 74.2%; ▌Brandon Wade (Democratic) 21.4%; ▌Ronnie Hopkins (Independent) 4.4%
Oklahoma 3	R+24	Frank Lucas	Republican	1994 (special)	Incumbent re-elected.	▌ ✓ Frank Lucas (Republican) 100%
Oklahoma 4	R+19	Tom Cole	Republican	2002	Incumbent re-elected.	▌ ✓ Tom Cole (Republican) 65.2%; ▌Mary Brannon (Democratic) 28.3%; ▌James Stacy (Independent) 6.5%
Oklahoma 5	R+12	Stephanie Bice	Republican	2020	Incumbent re-elected.	▌ ✓ Stephanie Bice (Republican) 60.7%; ▌Madison Horn (Democratic) 39.3%

== Oregon ==
District		Incumbent			This race	
Location	PVI	Member	Party	First elected	Results	Candidates
Oregon 1	D+18	Suzanne Bonamici	Democratic	2012 (special)	Incumbent re-elected.	▌ ✓ Suzanne Bonamici (Democratic) 68.8%; ▌Bob Todd (Republican) 28.2%; ▌Joe Christman (Libertarian) 3.1%
Oregon 2	R+15	Cliff Bentz	Republican	2020	Incumbent re-elected.	▌ ✓ Cliff Bentz (Republican) 64.0%; ▌Dan Ruby (Democratic) 32.8%; ▌Michael Stettler (Constitution) 3.2%
Oregon 3	D+22	Earl Blumenauer	Democratic	1996 (special)	Incumbent retired. Democratic hold.	▌ ✓ Maxine Dexter (Democratic) 67.9%; ▌Joanna Harbour (Republican) 25.3%; ▌David Walker (Progressive) 3.1%; ▌Joe Meyer (Pacific Green) 3.0%; ▌David Frosch (Constitution) 0.7%
Oregon 4	D+4	Val Hoyle	Democratic	2022	Incumbent re-elected.	▌ ✓ Val Hoyle (Democratic) 51.8%; ▌Monique DeSpain (Republican) 44.0%; ▌Justin Filip (Pacific Green) 2.7%; ▌Dan Bahlen (Libertarian) 1.5%
Oregon 5	D+2	Lori Chavez-DeRemer	Republican	2022	Incumbent lost re-election. Democratic gain.	▌ ✓ Janelle Bynum (Democratic) 47.7%; ▌Lori Chavez-DeRemer (Republican) 45.0%; ▌Brett Smith (Independent) 4.7%; Others: ▌Sonja Feintech (Libertarian) 1.5%; ▌Andrea Townsend (Pacific Green) 1.0%
Oregon 6	D+4	Andrea Salinas	Democratic	2022	Incumbent re-elected.	▌ ✓ Andrea Salinas (Democratic) 53.4%; ▌Mike Erickson (Republican) 46.6%

== Pennsylvania ==
District		Incumbent			This race	
Location	PVI	Member	Party	First elected	Results	Candidates
Pennsylvania 1	EVEN	Brian Fitzpatrick	Republican	2016	Incumbent re-elected.	▌ ✓ Brian Fitzpatrick (Republican) 56.4%; ▌Ashley Ehasz (Democratic) 43.6%
Pennsylvania 2	D+20	Brendan Boyle	Democratic	2014	Incumbent re-elected.	▌ ✓ Brendan Boyle (Democratic) 71.5%; ▌Haroon Bashir (Republican) 28.6%
Pennsylvania 3	D+39	Dwight Evans	Democratic	2016 (special)	Incumbent re-elected.	▌ ✓ Dwight Evans (Democratic) 100%
Pennsylvania 4	D+7	Madeleine Dean	Democratic	2018	Incumbent re-elected.	▌ ✓ Madeleine Dean (Democratic) 59.1%; ▌David Winkler (Republican) 40.9%
Pennsylvania 5	D+14	Mary Gay Scanlon	Democratic	2018 (special)	Incumbent re-elected.	▌ ✓ Mary Gay Scanlon (Democratic) 65.3%; ▌Alfeia DeVaughn-Goodwin (Republican) 34.7%
Pennsylvania 6	D+5	Chrissy Houlahan	Democratic	2018	Incumbent re-elected.	▌ ✓ Chrissy Houlahan (Democratic) 56.2%; ▌Neil Young Jr. (Republican) 43.8%
Pennsylvania 7	R+2	Susan Wild	Democratic	2018 (special)	Incumbent lost re-election. Republican gain.	▌ ✓ Ryan Mackenzie (Republican) 50.5%; ▌Susan Wild (Democratic) 49.5%
Pennsylvania 8	R+4	Matt Cartwright	Democratic	2012	Incumbent lost re-election. Republican gain.	▌ ✓ Rob Bresnahan (Republican) 50.8%; ▌Matt Cartwright (Democratic) 49.2%
Pennsylvania 9	R+21	Dan Meuser	Republican	2018	Incumbent re-elected.	▌ ✓ Dan Meuser (Republican) 70.5%; ▌Amanda Waldman (Democratic) 29.5%
Pennsylvania 10	R+5	Scott Perry	Republican	2012	Incumbent re-elected.	▌ ✓ Scott Perry (Republican) 50.6%; ▌Janelle Stelson (Democratic) 49.4%
Pennsylvania 11	R+13	Lloyd Smucker	Republican	2016	Incumbent re-elected.	▌ ✓ Lloyd Smucker (Republican) 62.9%; ▌Jim Atkinson (Democratic) 37.1%
Pennsylvania 12	D+8	Summer Lee	Democratic	2022	Incumbent re-elected.	▌ ✓ Summer Lee (Democratic) 56.4%; ▌James Hayes (Republican) 43.6%
Pennsylvania 13	R+25	John Joyce	Republican	2018	Incumbent re-elected.	▌ ✓ John Joyce (Republican) 74.2%; ▌Beth Farnham (Democratic) 25.8%
Pennsylvania 14	R+18	Guy Reschenthaler	Republican	2018	Incumbent re-elected.	▌ ✓ Guy Reschenthaler (Republican) 66.6%; ▌Christopher Dziados (Democratic) 33.4%
Pennsylvania 15	R+21	Glenn Thompson	Republican	2008	Incumbent re-elected.	▌ ✓ Glenn Thompson (Republican) 71.5%; ▌Zacheray Womer (Democratic) 28.5%
Pennsylvania 16	R+13	Mike Kelly	Republican	2010	Incumbent re-elected.	▌ ✓ Mike Kelly (Republican) 63.6%; ▌Preston Nouri (Democratic) 36.4%
Pennsylvania 17	EVEN	Chris Deluzio	Democratic	2022	Incumbent re-elected.	▌ ✓ Chris Deluzio (Democratic) 53.9%; ▌Rob Mercuri (Republican) 46.1%

== Rhode Island ==
District		Incumbent			This race	
Location	PVI	Member	Party	First elected	Results	Candidates
Rhode Island 1	D+12	Gabe Amo	Democratic	2023 (special)	Incumbent re-elected.	▌ ✓ Gabe Amo (Democratic) 63.2%; ▌Allen Waters (Republican) 32.1%; ▌Christopher Reynolds (Independent) 4.7%
Rhode Island 2	D+4	Seth Magaziner	Democratic	2022	Incumbent re-elected.	▌ ✓ Seth Magaziner (Democratic) 58.4%; ▌Steve Corvi (Republican) 41.6%

== South Carolina ==
District		Incumbent			This race	
Location	PVI	Member	Party	First elected	Results	Candidates
South Carolina 1	R+7	Nancy Mace	Republican	2020	Incumbent re-elected.	▌ ✓ Nancy Mace (Republican) 58.3%; ▌Michael Moore (Democratic) 41.7%
South Carolina 2	R+8	Joe Wilson	Republican	2001 (special)	Incumbent re-elected.	▌ ✓ Joe Wilson (Republican) 59.7%; ▌David Robinson II (Democratic) 40.3%
South Carolina 3	R+21	Jeff Duncan	Republican	2010	Incumbent retired. Republican hold.	▌ ✓ Sheri Biggs (Republican) 71.8%; ▌Bryon Best (Democratic) 25.4%; ▌Michael Bedenbaugh (Alliance) 2.9%
South Carolina 4	R+12	William Timmons	Republican	2018	Incumbent re-elected.	▌ ✓ William Timmons (Republican) 59.9%; ▌Kathryn Harvey (Democratic) 37.3%; ▌Mark Hackett (Constitution) 2.8%
South Carolina 5	R+12	Ralph Norman	Republican	2017 (special)	Incumbent re-elected.	▌ ✓ Ralph Norman (Republican) 63.6%; ▌Evangeline Hundley (Democratic) 36.4%
South Carolina 6	D+14	Jim Clyburn	Democratic	1992	Incumbent re-elected.	▌ ✓ Jim Clyburn (Democratic) 59.6%; ▌Duke Buckner (Republican) 36.8%; Others: ▌Michael Simpson (Libertarian) 1.7%; ▌Gregg Marcel Dixon (United Citizens) 1.6%; ▌Joseph Oddo (Alliance) 0.3%
South Carolina 7	R+11	Russell Fry	Republican	2022	Incumbent re-elected.	▌ ✓ Russell Fry (Republican) 65.0%; ▌Mal Hyman (Democratic) 35.0%

== South Dakota ==
District		Incumbent			This race	
Location	PVI	Member	Party	First elected	Results	Candidates
South Dakota at-large	R+16	Dusty Johnson	Republican	2018	Incumbent re-elected.	▌ ✓ Dusty Johnson (Republican) 72.0%; ▌Sheryl Johnson (Democratic) 28.0%

== Tennessee ==
District		Incumbent			This race	
Location	PVI	Member	Party	First elected	Results	Candidates
Tennessee 1	R+30	Diana Harshbarger	Republican	2020	Incumbent re-elected.	▌ ✓ Diana Harshbarger (Republican) 78.4%; ▌Kevin Jenkins (Democratic) 19.1%; Others: ▌Richard Baker (Independent) 1.7%; ▌Levi Brake (Independent) 0.8%
Tennessee 2	R+18	Tim Burchett	Republican	2018	Incumbent re-elected.	▌ ✓ Tim Burchett (Republican) 69.3%; ▌Jane George (Democratic) 30.7%
Tennessee 3	R+19	Chuck Fleischmann	Republican	2010	Incumbent re-elected.	▌ ✓ Chuck Fleischmann (Republican) 67.5%; ▌Jack Allen (Democratic) 29.4%; Others: ▌Stephen King (Independent) 1.7%; ▌Jean Howard-Hill (Independent) 1.5%
Tennessee 4	R+22	Scott DesJarlais	Republican	2010	Incumbent re-elected.	▌ ✓ Scott DesJarlais (Republican) 70.0%; ▌Victoria Broderick (Democratic) 26.8%; Others: ▌Keith Nolan (Independent) 1.8% ▌Earnest Ensley (Independent) 1.5%
Tennessee 5	R+9	Andy Ogles	Republican	2022	Incumbent re-elected.	▌ ✓ Andy Ogles (Republican) 56.9%; ▌Maryam Abolfazli (Democratic) 39.5%; Others: ▌Jim Larkin (Independent) 2.1%; ▌Bob Titley (Independent) 0.8%; ▌Yomi Faparusi (Independent) 0.7%
Tennessee 6	R+17	John Rose	Republican	2018	Incumbent re-elected.	▌ ✓ John Rose (Republican) 68.0%; ▌Lore Bergman (Democratic) 32.0%
Tennessee 7	R+10	Mark Green	Republican	2018	Incumbent re-elected.	▌ ✓ Mark Green (Republican) 59.5%; ▌Megan Barry (Democratic) 38.0%; ▌Shaun Greene (Independent) 2.5%
Tennessee 8	R+21	David Kustoff	Republican	2016	Incumbent re-elected.	▌ ✓ David Kustoff (Republican) 72.3%; ▌Sarah Freeman (Democratic) 25.6%; ▌James Hart (Independent) 2.1%
Tennessee 9	D+22	Steve Cohen	Democratic	2006	Incumbent re-elected.	▌ ✓ Steve Cohen (Democratic) 71.3%; ▌Charlotte Bergmann (Republican) 25.7%; Others: ▌Wendell Wells (Independent) 1.7%; ▌Dennis Clark (Independent) 1.4%

== Texas ==
District		Incumbent			This race	
Location	PVI	Member	Party	First elected	Results	Candidates
Texas 1	R+26	Nathaniel Moran	Republican	2022	Incumbent re-elected.	▌ ✓ Nathaniel Moran (Republican) 100%
Texas 2	R+15	Dan Crenshaw	Republican	2018	Incumbent re-elected.	▌ ✓ Dan Crenshaw (Republican) 65.7%; ▌Peter Filler (Democratic) 34.3%
Texas 3	R+11	Keith Self	Republican	2022	Incumbent re-elected.	▌ ✓ Keith Self (Republican) 62.5%; ▌Sandeep Srivastava (Democratic) 37.5%
Texas 4	R+16	Pat Fallon	Republican	2020	Incumbent re-elected.	▌ ✓ Pat Fallon (Republican) 68.4%; ▌Simon Cardell (Democratic) 31.6%
Texas 5	R+14	Lance Gooden	Republican	2018	Incumbent re-elected.	▌ ✓ Lance Gooden (Republican) 64.1%; ▌Ruth Torres (Democratic) 35.9%
Texas 6	R+15	Jake Ellzey	Republican	2021 (special)	Incumbent re-elected.	▌ ✓ Jake Ellzey (Republican) 65.7%; ▌John Love III (Democratic) 34.3%
Texas 7	D+13	Lizzie Fletcher	Democratic	2018	Incumbent re-elected.	▌ ✓ Lizzie Fletcher (Democratic) 61.3%; ▌Caroline Kane (Republican) 38.7%
Texas 8	R+16	Morgan Luttrell	Republican	2022	Incumbent re-elected.	▌ ✓ Morgan Luttrell (Republican) 68.2%; ▌Laura Jones (Democratic) 31.8%
Texas 9	D+26	Al Green	Democratic	2004	Incumbent re-elected.	▌ ✓ Al Green (Democratic) 100%
Texas 10	R+13	Michael McCaul	Republican	2004	Incumbent re-elected.	▌ ✓ Michael McCaul (Republican) 63.6%; ▌Theresa Boisseau (Democratic) 34.0%; ▌Jeff Miller (Libertarian) 2.4%
Texas 11	R+23	August Pfluger	Republican	2020	Incumbent re-elected.	▌ ✓ August Pfluger (Republican) 100%
Texas 12	R+12	Kay Granger	Republican	1996	Incumbent retired. Republican hold.	▌ ✓ Craig Goldman (Republican) 63.5%; ▌Trey Hunt (Democratic) 36.5%
Texas 13	R+26	Ronny Jackson	Republican	2020	Incumbent re-elected.	▌ ✓ Ronny Jackson (Republican) 100%
Texas 14	R+17	Randy Weber	Republican	2012	Incumbent re-elected.	▌ ✓ Randy Weber (Republican) 68.7%; ▌Rhonda Hart (Democratic) 31.3%
Texas 15	R+1	Monica De La Cruz	Republican	2022	Incumbent re-elected.	▌ ✓ Monica De La Cruz (Republican) 57.1%; ▌Michelle Vallejo (Democratic) 42.9%
Texas 16	D+17	Veronica Escobar	Democratic	2018	Incumbent re-elected.	▌ ✓ Veronica Escobar (Democratic) 59.5%; ▌Irene Armendariz-Jackson (Republican) 40.5%
Texas 17	R+14	Pete Sessions	Republican	1996; 2018 (lost); 2020	Incumbent re-elected.	▌ ✓ Pete Sessions (Republican) 66.3%; ▌Mark Lorenzen (Democratic) 33.7%
Texas 18	D+23	Vacant			Rep. Sheila Jackson Lee (D) died July 19, 2024. Erica Lee Carter elected to unexpired term in a concurrent special election. Democratic hold.	▌ ✓ Sylvester Turner (Democratic) 69.4%; ▌Lana Centonze (Republican) 30.6%
Texas 19	R+26	Jodey Arrington	Republican	2016	Incumbent re-elected.	▌ ✓ Jodey Arrington (Republican) 80.7%; ▌Nathan Lewis (Independent) 10.3%; ▌Bernard Johnson (Libertarian) 9.0%
Texas 20	D+15	Joaquin Castro	Democratic	2012	Incumbent re-elected.	▌ ✓ Joaquin Castro (Democratic) 100%
Texas 21	R+13	Chip Roy	Republican	2018	Incumbent re-elected.	▌ ✓ Chip Roy (Republican) 61.9%; ▌Kristin Hook (Democratic) 36.1%; ▌Bob King (Libertarian) 2.1%
Texas 22	R+11	Troy Nehls	Republican	2020	Incumbent re-elected.	▌ ✓ Troy Nehls (Republican) 62.1%; ▌Marquette Greene-Scott (Democratic) 37.9%
Texas 23	R+5	Tony Gonzales	Republican	2020	Incumbent re-elected.	▌ ✓ Tony Gonzales (Republican) 62.3%; ▌Santos Limon (Democratic) 37.7%
Texas 24	R+10	Beth Van Duyne	Republican	2020	Incumbent re-elected.	▌ ✓ Beth Van Duyne (Republican) 60.3%; ▌Sam Eppler (Democratic) 39.7%
Texas 25	R+19	Roger Williams	Republican	2012	Incumbent re-elected.	▌ ✓ Roger Williams (Republican) 100%
Texas 26	R+13	Michael C. Burgess	Republican	2002	Incumbent retired. Republican hold.	▌ ✓ Brandon Gill (Republican) 62.1%; ▌Ernest Lineberger III (Democratic) 35.7%; ▌Phil Gray (Libertarian) 2.3%
Texas 27	R+13	Michael Cloud	Republican	2018 (special)	Incumbent re-elected.	▌ ✓ Michael Cloud (Republican) 66.0%; ▌Tanya Lloyd (Democratic) 34.0%
Texas 28	D+3	Henry Cuellar	Democratic	2004	Incumbent re-elected.	▌ ✓ Henry Cuellar (Democratic) 52.8%; ▌Jay Furman (Republican) 47.2%
Texas 29	D+18	Sylvia Garcia	Democratic	2018	Incumbent re-elected.	▌ ✓ Sylvia Garcia (Democratic) 65.3%; ▌Alan Garza (Republican) 34.7%
Texas 30	D+27	Jasmine Crockett	Democratic	2022	Incumbent re-elected.	▌ ✓ Jasmine Crockett (Democratic) 84.9%; ▌Jrmar Jefferson (Libertarian) 15.1%
Texas 31	R+14	John Carter	Republican	2002	Incumbent re-elected.	▌ ✓ John Carter (Republican) 64.4%; ▌Stuart Whitlow (Democratic) 35.6%
Texas 32	D+14	Colin Allred	Democratic	2018	Incumbent retired to run for U.S. Senate. Democratic hold.	▌ ✓ Julie Johnson (Democratic) 60.5%; ▌Darrell Day (Republican) 37.0%; ▌Kevin Hale (Libertarian) 2.6%
Texas 33	D+24	Marc Veasey	Democratic	2012	Incumbent re-elected.	▌ ✓ Marc Veasey (Democratic) 68.8%; ▌Patrick Gillespie (Republican) 31.2%
Texas 34	D+9	Vicente Gonzalez	Democratic	2016	Incumbent re-elected.	▌ ✓ Vicente Gonzalez (Democratic) 51.3%; ▌Mayra Flores (Republican) 48.7%
Texas 35	D+21	Greg Casar	Democratic	2022	Incumbent re-elected.	▌ ✓ Greg Casar (Democratic) 67.4%; ▌Steven Wright (Republican) 32.6%
Texas 36	R+18	Brian Babin	Republican	2014	Incumbent re-elected.	▌ ✓ Brian Babin (Republican) 69.4%; ▌Dayna Steele (Democratic) 30.6%
Texas 37	D+24	Lloyd Doggett	Democratic	1994	Incumbent re-elected.	▌ ✓ Lloyd Doggett (Democratic) 74.2%; ▌Jenny Garcia Sharon (Republican) 23.6%; ▌Girish Altekar (Libertarian) 2.2%
Texas 38	R+12	Wesley Hunt	Republican	2022	Incumbent re-elected.	▌ ✓ Wesley Hunt (Republican) 62.7%; ▌Melissa McDonough (Democratic) 37.2%

== Utah ==
District		Incumbent			This race	
Location	PVI	Member	Party	First elected	Results	Candidates
Utah 1	R+12	Blake Moore	Republican	2020	Incumbent re-elected.	▌ ✓ Blake Moore (Republican) 63.1%; ▌Bill Campbell (Democratic) 32.1%; ▌Daniel Cottam (Libertarian) 4.8%
Utah 2	R+11	Celeste Maloy	Republican	2023 (special)	Incumbent re-elected.	▌ ✓ Celeste Maloy (Republican) 58.0%; ▌Nathaniel Woodward (Democratic) 34.2%; ▌Cassie Easley (Constitution) 5.5%; ▌Tyler Murset (Independent) 2.2%
Utah 3	R+13	John Curtis	Republican	2017 (special)	Incumbent retired to run for U.S. Senate. Republican hold.	▌ ✓ Mike Kennedy (Republican) 66.4%; ▌Glenn Wright (Democratic) 33.6%
Utah 4	R+16	Burgess Owens	Republican	2020	Incumbent re-elected.	▌ ✓ Burgess Owens (Republican) 63.4%; ▌Katrina Fallick-Wang (Democratic) 30.2%; ▌Vaughn Cook (United Utah) 4.8%; ▌Evan Bullard (Independent) 1.6%

== Vermont ==
District		Incumbent			This race	
Location	PVI	Member	Party	First elected	Results	Candidates
Vermont at-large	D+16	Becca Balint	Democratic	2022	Incumbent re-elected.	▌ ✓ Becca Balint (Democratic) 62.5%; ▌Mark Coester (Republican) 29.9%; ▌Adam Ortiz (Independent) 5.5%; ▌Jill Diamondstone (Peace & Justice) 2.2%

== Virginia ==
District		Incumbent			This race	
Location	PVI	Member	Party	First elected	Results	Candidates
Virginia 1	R+6	Rob Wittman	Republican	2007 (special)	Incumbent re-elected.	▌ ✓ Rob Wittman (Republican) 56.4%; ▌Leslie Mehta (Democratic) 43.6%
Virginia 2	R+2	Jen Kiggans	Republican	2022	Incumbent re-elected.	▌ ✓ Jen Kiggans (Republican) 50.8%; ▌Missy Cotter Smasal (Democratic) 47.0%; ▌Robert Reid Jr. (Independent) 2.3%
Virginia 3	D+17	Bobby Scott	Democratic	1992	Incumbent re-elected.	▌ ✓ Bobby Scott (Democratic) 70.1%; ▌John Sitka (Republican) 29.9%; ▌Rhonda Taylor-Young (Independent)
Virginia 4	D+16	Jennifer McClellan	Democratic	2023 (special)	Incumbent re-elected.	▌ ✓ Jennifer McClellan (Democratic) 67.5%; ▌Bill Moher (Republican) 32.5%
Virginia 5	R+7	Bob Good	Republican	2020	Incumbent lost renomination. Republican hold.	▌ ✓ John McGuire (Republican) 57.5%; ▌Gloria Witt (Democratic) 42.5%
Virginia 6	R+14	Ben Cline	Republican	2018	Incumbent re-elected.	▌ ✓ Ben Cline (Republican) 63.2%; ▌Ken Mitchell (Democratic) 34.8%; ▌Robby Wells Jr. (Independent) 2.0%
Virginia 7	D+1	Abigail Spanberger	Democratic	2018	Incumbent retired to run for governor. Democratic hold.	▌ ✓ Eugene Vindman (Democratic) 51.3%; ▌Derrick Anderson (Republican) 48.7%
Virginia 8	D+26	Don Beyer	Democratic	2014	Incumbent re-elected.	▌ ✓ Don Beyer (Democratic) 71.7%; ▌Jerry Torres (Republican) 24.7%; ▌David Kennedy (Independent) 2.6%; ▌Bentley Hensel (Independent) 0.9%
Virginia 9	R+23	Morgan Griffith	Republican	2010	Incumbent re-elected.	▌ ✓ Morgan Griffith (Republican) 72.6%; ▌Karen Baker (Democratic) 27.4%
Virginia 10	D+6	Jennifer Wexton	Democratic	2018	Incumbent retired. Democratic hold.	▌ ✓ Suhas Subramanyam (Democratic) 52.3%; ▌Mike Clancy (Republican) 47.7%
Virginia 11	D+18	Gerry Connolly	Democratic	2008	Incumbent re-elected.	▌ ✓ Gerry Connolly (Democratic) 67.0%; ▌Mike Van Meter (Republican) 33.0%

== Washington ==
District		Incumbent			This race	
Location	PVI	Member	Party	First elected	Results	Candidates
Washington 1	D+13	Suzan DelBene	Democratic	2012 (special)	Incumbent re-elected.	▌ ✓ Suzan DelBene (Democratic) 63.2%; ▌Jeb Brewer (Republican) 36.8%
Washington 2	D+9	Rick Larsen	Democratic	2000	Incumbent re-elected.	▌ ✓ Rick Larsen (Democratic) 64.0%; ▌Cody Hart (Republican) 36.0%
Washington 3	R+5	Marie Gluesenkamp Perez	Democratic	2022	Incumbent re-elected.	▌ ✓ Marie Gluesenkamp Perez (Democratic) 51.7%; ▌Joe Kent (Republican) 47.9%
Washington 4	R+11	Dan Newhouse	Republican	2014	Incumbent re-elected.	▌ ✓ Dan Newhouse (Republican) 53.0%; ▌Jerrod Sessler (Republican) 47.0%
Washington 5	R+8	Cathy McMorris Rodgers	Republican	2004	Incumbent retired. Republican hold.	▌ ✓ Michael Baumgartner (Republican) 60.7%; ▌Carmela Conroy (Democratic) 39.3%
Washington 6	D+6	Derek Kilmer	Democratic	2012	Incumbent retired. Democratic hold.	▌ ✓ Emily Randall (Democratic) 56.8%; ▌Drew MacEwen (Republican) 43.2%
Washington 7	D+36	Pramila Jayapal	Democratic	2016	Incumbent re-elected.	▌ ✓ Pramila Jayapal (Democratic) 84.2%; ▌Dan Alexander (Republican) 15.8%
Washington 8	D+1	Kim Schrier	Democratic	2018	Incumbent re-elected.	▌ ✓ Kim Schrier (Democratic) 54.1%; ▌Carmen Goers (Republican) 45.9%
Washington 9	D+21	Adam Smith	Democratic	1996	Incumbent re-elected.	▌ ✓ Adam Smith (Democratic) 66.9%; ▌Melissa Chaudhry (Democratic) 33.1%
Washington 10	D+7	Marilyn Strickland	Democratic	2020	Incumbent re-elected.	▌ ✓ Marilyn Strickland (Democratic) 58.7%; ▌Don Hewett (Republican) 41.3%

== West Virginia ==
District		Incumbent			This race	
Location	PVI	Member	Party	First elected	Results	Candidates
West Virginia 1	R+23	Carol Miller	Republican	2018	Incumbent re-elected.	▌ ✓ Carol Miller (Republican) 66.4%; ▌Chris Reed (Democratic) 24.2%; ▌Wes Holden (Independent) 7.4%
West Virginia 2	R+22	Alex Mooney	Republican	2014	Incumbent retired to run for U.S. Senate. Republican hold.	▌ ✓ Riley Moore (Republican) 70.8%; ▌Steven Wendelin (Democratic) 29.2%

== Wisconsin ==
District		Incumbent			This race	
Location	PVI	Member	Party	First elected	Results	Candidates
Wisconsin 1	R+3	Bryan Steil	Republican	2018	Incumbent re-elected.	▌ ✓ Bryan Steil (Republican) 54.1%; ▌Peter Barca (Democratic) 43.9%; ▌Chester Todd Jr. (Green) 2.1%
Wisconsin 2	D+19	Mark Pocan	Democratic	2012	Incumbent re-elected.	▌ ✓ Mark Pocan (Democratic) 70.1%; ▌Erik Olsen (Republican) 29.9%
Wisconsin 3	R+4	Derrick Van Orden	Republican	2022	Incumbent re-elected.	▌ ✓ Derrick Van Orden (Republican) 51.4%; ▌Rebecca Cooke (Democratic) 48.6%
Wisconsin 4	D+25	Gwen Moore	Democratic	2004	Incumbent re-elected.	▌ ✓ Gwen Moore (Democratic) 74.9%; ▌Tim Rogers (Republican) 22.4%; ▌Robert Raymond (Independent) 2.6%
Wisconsin 5	R+14	Scott Fitzgerald	Republican	2020	Incumbent re-elected.	▌ ✓ Scott Fitzgerald (Republican) 64.5%; ▌Ben Steinhoff (Democratic) 35.5%
Wisconsin 6	R+10	Glenn Grothman	Republican	2014	Incumbent re-elected.	▌ ✓ Glenn Grothman (Republican) 61.3%; ▌John Zarbano (Democratic) 38.7%
Wisconsin 7	R+12	Tom Tiffany	Republican	2020 (special)	Incumbent re-elected.	▌ ✓ Tom Tiffany (Republican) 63.6%; ▌Kyle Kilbourn (Democratic) 36.4%
Wisconsin 8	R+10	Vacant			Rep. Mike Gallagher (R) resigned April 24, 2024. Republican hold. New member also elected to the unexpired term; see above.	▌ ✓ Tony Wied (Republican) 57.3%; ▌Kristin Lyerly (Democratic) 42.7%

== Wyoming ==
District		Incumbent			This race	
Location	PVI	Member	Party	First elected	Results	Candidates
Wyoming at-large	R+25	Harriet Hageman	Republican	2022	Incumbent re-elected.	▌ ✓ Harriet Hageman (Republican) 71.0%; ▌Kyle Cameron (Democratic) 23.4%; ▌Richard Brubaker (Libertarian) 3.5%; ▌Jeffrey Haggit (Constitution) 2.1%

== Non-voting delegates ==
District	Incumbent			This race	
District	Delegate	Party	First elected	Results	Candidates
American Samoa at-large	Amata Coleman Radewagen	Republican	2014	Incumbent re-elected.	▌ ✓ Amata Coleman Radewagen (Nonpartisan) 74.8%; ▌Luisa Kuaea (Nonpartisan) 18.6%; ▌Fualaau Rosie Lancaster (Nonpartisan) 4.7%; ▌Meleagi Suitonu-Chapman (Nonpartisan) 1.9%
District of Columbia at-large	Eleanor Holmes Norton	Democratic	1990	Incumbent re-elected.	▌ ✓ Eleanor Holmes Norton (Democratic) 80.1%; ▌Kymone Freeman (Statehood Green) 7.0%; ▌Myrtle Alexander (Republican) 6.3%; ▌Michael A. Brown (Independent) 6.1%
Guam at-large	James Moylan	Republican	2022	Incumbent re-elected.	▌ ✓ James Moylan (Republican) 52.7%; ▌Ginger Cruz (Democratic) 46.8%
Northern Mariana Islands at-large	Gregorio Sablan	Democratic	2008 (Note: Sablan was first elected as an Independent and switched to the Democratic Party in October 2021.)	Incumbent retired. New member elected. Republican gain.	▌ ✓ Kimberlyn King-Hinds (Republican) 40.3%; ▌Ed Propst (Democratic) 33.3%; ▌John Gonzales (Independent) 18.7%; ▌James Rayphand (Independent) 5.4%; ▌Liana Hofschneider (Independent) 2.3%
Puerto Rico at-large	Jenniffer González-Colón	PNP/ Republican (Note: González-Colón is a member of the Republican Party in Congress, but runs in elections under Puerto Rico's New Progressive Party (PNP).)	2016	Incumbent retired to run for governor. New member elected. PPD/Democratic gain.	▌ ✓ Pablo Hernández Rivera (PPD/Democratic) 44.6%; ▌William Villafañe (PNP/Republican) 35.0%; ▌Ana Irma Rivera Lassén (MVC) 10.0%; ▌Viviana Ramírez Morales (PD) 5.3%; ▌Roberto Velázquez (PIP) 5.2%
U.S. Virgin Islands at-large	Stacey Plaskett	Democratic	2014	Incumbent re-elected.	▌ ✓ Stacey Plaskett (Democratic) 73.4%; ▌Ida Smith (Independent) 16.4%; ▌Ronald Pickard (Republican) 9.5%

== See also ==
- 2024 United States elections
  - 2024 United States gubernatorial elections
  - 2024 United States presidential election
  - 2024 United States Senate elections
- 118th United States Congress
- 119th United States Congress
  - List of new members of the 119th United States Congress
