= List of killings by law enforcement officers in the United States, March 2011 =

This is a list of people reported killed by non-military law enforcement officers in the United States in March 2011, whether in the line of duty or not, and regardless of reason or method. The listing documents the occurrence of a death, making no implications regarding wrongdoing or justification on the part of the person killed or officer involved. Killings are arranged by date of the incident that caused death. Different death dates, if known, are noted in the description. The table below lists 39 people.

== March 2011 ==
Date	Name (Age) of Deceased	State (city)	Description						
2011-03-31	Arnold, Justin (17)	New York (Canastota)	Shot and killed by Canastota police. As part of a pre-planned suicide by cop, Arnold reported a false carjacking and pointed a pellet gun at the police when they arrived.	2011-3-11 Daniel Phillip Chapman	GreenwoodSc 26	2011-03-29	Chad Harris (42)	Kalamazoo, Michigan	Six months after the accidental death of his 17-year-old son, former paramedic Chad Harris was to be mentally unwell. Harris phoned emergency services claiming to have a hostage in his home, later determined to be his mother. Police arrived at the home of Harris, secured the hostage without incident, entered the home, and shot and killed Harris who was allegedly brandishing a 4" kitchen knife.
2011-03-29	Unnamed man (40s)	Illinois (Chicago)							
2011-03-29	Chabot, Richard (33)	Florida (Jacksonville)							
2011-03-29	Cedric Telasco (21)	Florida (Lauderhill)							
2011-03-27	Runyon, James (44)	Arizona (Pima County)							
2011-03-27	Paulson, Katherine	Maine (Kennebunk)	Shot after advancing on police with knife in hand and refusing commands to drop weapon. Officers were responding to report of a domestic disturbance in which Paulson's mother reported she was afraid for her own well-being regarding daughter with history of psychiatric illness.						
2011-03-26	Orlando Santos (28)	New York (Bronx)							
2011-03-26	Pulaski, Jeremiah (24)	Arizona (Glendale)							
2011-03-25	Marlon Johnson (60)	Nebraska (North Platte)							
2011-03-21	LaMadrid, Carlos (19)	Arizona							
2011-03-20	Gidenko, Oleg	Colorado (Aurora)	Shot while fleeing in vehicle from police who were investigating report of stolen vehicle. City settled with Gidenko's family for $150,000						
2011-03-20	Cortez Hamm (20)	Missouri (Centreville)							
2011-03-19	Eric Stafford (21)	Massachusetts (Fitchburg)							
2011-03-19	Sampson, Eric G.	Washington (Ravensdale)	Shot after refusing to lay down a machete Sampson had used to strike an officer's cart. Sampson was pulled over in a routine traffic stop then fled in vehicle. Sampson was found near registration address of vehicle. Use of Tasers was ineffective.						
2011-03-17	Williams, Aaron	Colorado (Aurora)	Shot after firing on police, wounding officer and taking a family of four hostage. Police had chased the man into an apartment complex following a traffic stop. The police released gas into the apartment and the man climbed out of a window holding a gun. Was shot by SWAT team at that point.						
2011-03-17	Gardner, Marvin	California (Fresno)	Fresno Police responded to reported burglary at a quick cash store. There were employees in the store and the two suspects were reported to be armed. An officer pursued Gardner who climbed over a fence back of the store before stopping at the officer's orders. Gardner began to lift his coat using both his hands. The officer, thinking Gardner was going for a weapon, shot and killed him.						
2011-03-17	Herbert Harris (29)	Florida (Jacksonville)							
2011-03-16	unnamed male	Idaho (Bonners Ferry-area)	Died due to an "unknown medical event" after deputy used a Taser while attempting to subdue the man. Deputy was responding to a report of a naked man and his vehicle blocking a road.						
2011-03-15	Garcia, Daniel	Colorado (Aurora)	Shot in vehicle after shooting at police to include one shot to police officer's arm. Police were approaching vehicle in which Garcia had taken two hostages.						
2011-03-15	Samuels, Seyoum (18)	Florida (Tamarac)							
2011-03-12	Breitkopf, Geoffrey	New York (Massapequa Park)	Nassau County Police officer, accidentally shot by MTA Police officer who mistook Breitkopf for an armed suspect.						
2011-03-12	DiGeronimo, Anthony	New York (Massapequa Park)	Shot by two Nassau County Police officers when he lunged at them with knives.						
2011-03-12	Robert Elliis	New Jersey (Washington Township)							
2011-03-09	Johnson, Nicholas (22)	Arizona (Tucson)							
2011-03-09	Hammond, Michael	Georgia (Buckhead)	Shot after producing a weapon. Police had followed Hammond in his vehicle as the prime suspect in a recent bank robbery.						
2011-03-09	Terry Winston (34)	Illinois (Chicago)							
2011-03-09	Lopez, Ernesto (26)	Arizona (Phoenix)							
2011-03-08	Rowton, William Wayne	Washington (Kelso)	Shot from a distance of about 200 ft after pointing revolver out a sliding glass door towards police. Police were responding to report of a suicidal person.						
2011-03-08	Carlos Boles	Missouri (St. Louis)							
2011-03-07	Jose Venavides (54)	California (Redding)							
2011-03-06	Carlos Harris (23)	Louisiana (Baton Rouge)							
2011-03-05	Unnamed man (26)	California (San Diego)							
2011-03-03	Le, Van Dinh (47)	California (Escondido)	Le was shot once in the forehead by an Escondid Police Department officer, after police came to his home to respond to Le being suicidal and mentally unstable. According to officers, Le was in a bathroom and had a pair of 8-inch scissors, and refused to drop it when demanded to by police, and then advanced towards the officers with the scissors.						
2011-03-03	Todd Wolford (34)	New Jersey (Ocean Township)							
2011-03-02	Wayne Martin (29)	New Hampshire (Concord)							
2011-03-02	Adrian, Jacob (20)	Arizona (Phoenix)							
2011-03-02	Unnamed man	New York (Garden City)							
2011-03-01	Daniel LeCleir (44)	Wisconsin (De Pere)							
2011-03-01	Brian Dollarhide (30)	Oklahoma (Perry)							

== See also ==
- Death in custody § United States
- Henry A. Wallace Police Crime Public Database
- List of cases of police brutality
- List of countries with annual rates and counts for killings by law enforcement officers
- List of law enforcement officers killed in the line of duty in the United States
- List of law enforcement officers convicted for an on-duty killing in the United States
- List of shootings by US immigration agents
- List of police reforms related to the George Floyd protests
- List of unarmed African Americans killed by law enforcement officers in the United States
- Lists of killings by law enforcement officers
- Police brutality in the United States
- Police misconduct § United States
- Police riot § United States
- Police use of deadly force in the United States
