= East Massapequa, New York =

East Massapequa, New York West Amityville, New York
- Hamlet and census-designated place
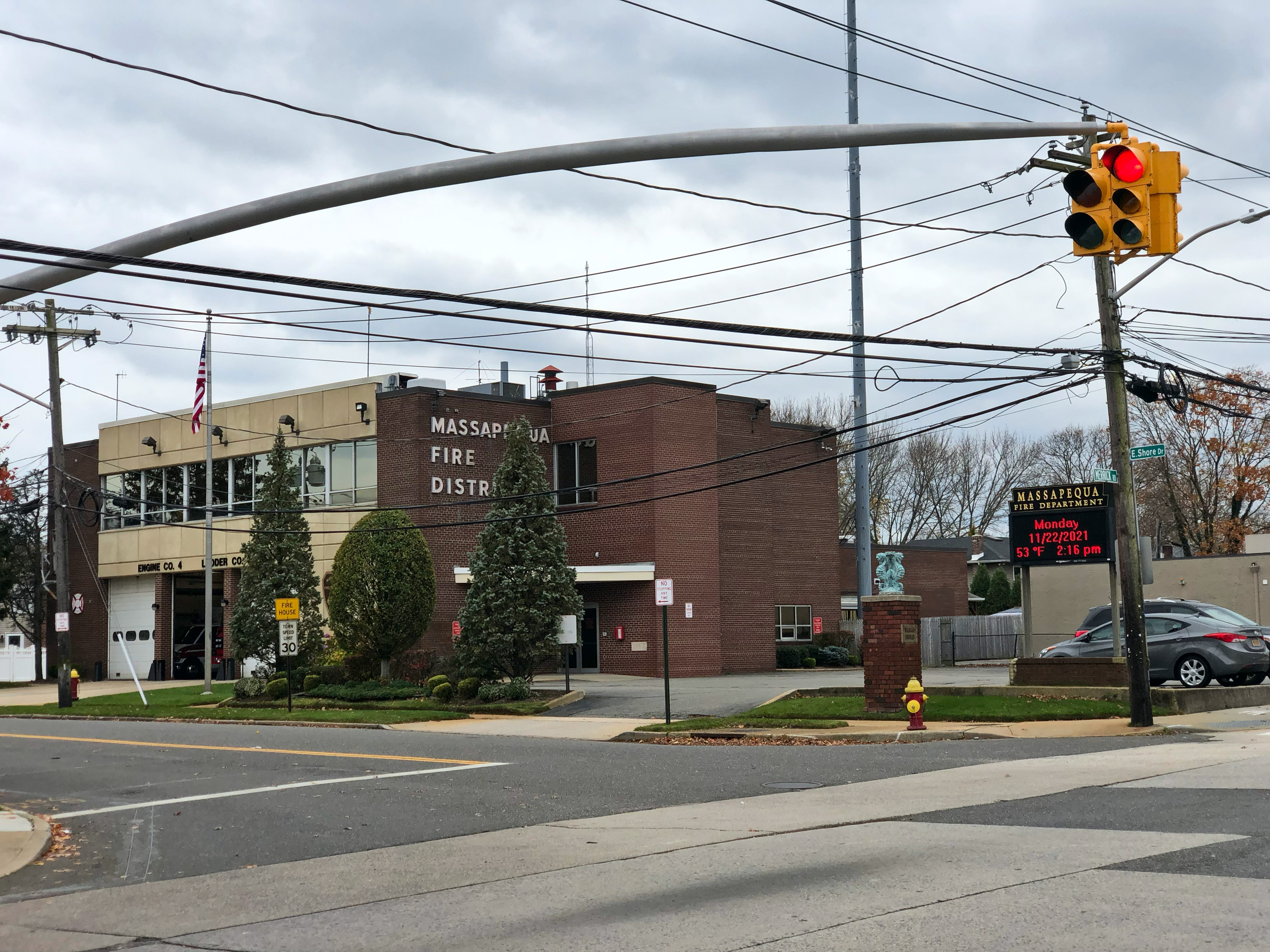
- A Massapequa Fire Department firehouse in East Massapequa in 2021
- Nickname: East Mass
- Location in Nassau County and the state of New York

- Location on Long Island Location within the state of New York
- Coordinates: 40°40′26″N 73°26′9″W
- Country: United States
- State: New York
- County: Nassau
- Town: Oyster Bay
- Named for: Its location east of Massapequa and Massapequa Park

Area
  - Total: 3.53 sq mi (9.15 km^{2})
  - Land: 3.38 sq mi (8.75 km^{2})
  - Water: 0.15 sq mi (0.40 km^{2})
- Elevation: 13 ft (4 m)

Population (2020)
  - Total: 19,854
  - Density: 5,875.7/sq mi (2,268.61/km^{2})
- Time zone: UTC-5 (Eastern (EST))
  - Summer (DST): UTC-4 (EDT)
- ZIP Codes: 11758 (Massapequa); 11762 (Massapequa Park)
- Area codes: 516, 363
- FIPS code: 36-22480
- GNIS feature ID: 1867402

East Massapequa is a hamlet and census-designated place (CDP) located within the Town of Oyster Bay in Nassau County, on the South Shore of Long Island, in New York, United States. The population was 19,854 at the time of the 2020 census.

The portions of East Massapequa located to the east of Carman Creek were formerly within the CDP of West Amityville until being absorbed by the East Massapequa CDP.

== History ==
The easternmost third of East Massapequa (located east of Carman Creek, within the Amityville Union Free School District) – known as the hamlet of West Amityville – was previously its own Census-designated place known as West Amityville; it started utilizing a Massapequa mailing address in 1975, and subsequently merged into the East Massapequa CDP. Certain maps continue to designate this easternmost part of the CDP as West Amityville, but within Nassau County.

The name "East Massapequa" reflects the fact that the hamlet is located east of Massapequa and Massapequa Park.

== Geography ==
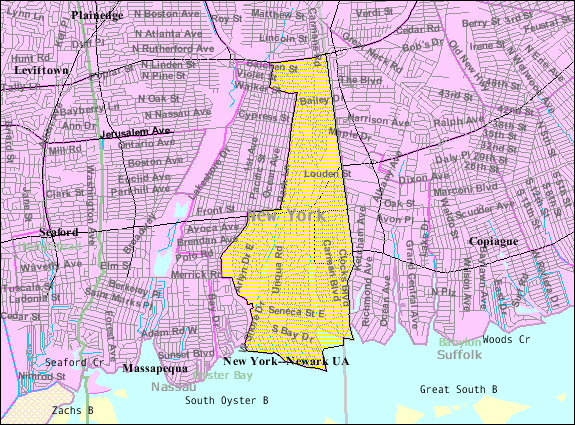
U.S. Census map of East Massapequa

According to the United States Census Bureau, the CDP has a total area of 3.6 square miles (9.3 km^{2}), of which 3.5 square miles (9.1 km^{2}) is land and 0.1 square miles (0.26 km^{2}), or 2.51%, is water.

=== Climate ===
East Massapequa has a humid subtropical climate (Cfa), bordering on a hot-summer humid continental climate (Dfa). Accordingly, the CDP experiences hot, humid summers and cold winters, and experiences precipitation throughout the entirety of the year.

== Demographics ==
Historical population
Census	Pop.	Note	%±
2000	19,565		—
2010	19,069		−2.5%
2020	19,854		4.1%
U.S. Decennial Census

=== 2020 census ===
As of the 2020 census, East Massapequa had a population of 19,854. The median age was 44.7 years. 19.1% of residents were under the age of 18 and 20.7% of residents were 65 years of age or older. For every 100 females there were 93.1 males, and for every 100 females age 18 and over there were 90.3 males age 18 and over.

100.0% of residents lived in urban areas, while 0.0% lived in rural areas.

There were 6,884 households in East Massapequa, of which 30.2% had children under the age of 18 living in them. Of all households, 55.9% were married-couple households, 13.4% were households with a male householder and no spouse or partner present, and 26.4% were households with a female householder and no spouse or partner present. About 21.7% of all households were made up of individuals and 13.2% had someone living alone who was 65 years of age or older.

There were 7,112 housing units, of which 3.2% were vacant. The homeowner vacancy rate was 0.9% and the rental vacancy rate was 3.5%.

Racial composition as of the 2020 census
Race	Number	Percent
White	13,980	70.4%
Black or African American	2,513	12.7%
American Indian and Alaska Native	74	0.4%
Asian	495	2.5%
Native Hawaiian and Other Pacific Islander	8	0.0%
Some other race	1,306	6.6%
Two or more races	1,478	7.4%
Hispanic or Latino (of any race)	2,775	14.0%

=== 2000 census ===
As of the census of 2000, there were 19,565 people, 6,432 households, and 5,107 families residing in the CDP. The population density was 5,592.8 inhabitants per square mile (2,159.4/km^{2}). There were 6,535 housing units at an average density of 1,868.1 per square mile (721.3/km^{2}). The racial makeup of the CDP was 74.91% White, 12.34% African American, 0.20% Native American, 2.23% Asian, 0.03% Pacific Islander, 2.47% from other races, and 1.90% from two or more races. Hispanic or Latino of any race were 7.49% of the population. Most of East Massapequa’s African American and Hispanic populations live east of Carman Creek in the section served by the Amityville Union Free School District and formerly known as "West Amityville.”

There were 6,432 households, out of which 36.6% had children under the age of 18 living with them, 64.6% were married couples living together, 11.0% had a female householder with no husband present, and 20.6% were non-families. 16.4% of all households were made up of individuals, and 8.9% had someone living alone who was 65 years of age or older. The average household size was 3.00 and the average family size was 3.37.

In the CDP, the population was spread out, with 25.1% under the age of 18, 6.6% from 18 to 24, 31.1% from 25 to 44, 23.0% from 45 to 64, and 14.2% who were 65 years of age or older. The median age was 38 years. For every 100 females, there were 93.4 males. For every 100 females age 18 and over, there were 88.9 males.

The median income for a household in the CDP was $75,565, and the median income for a family was $83,373. Males had a median income of $56,032 versus $37,885 for females. The per capita income for the CDP was $28,585. About 2.4% of families and 3.4% of the population were below the poverty line, including 2.8% of those under age 18 and 5.5% of those age 65 or over.

== Economy ==
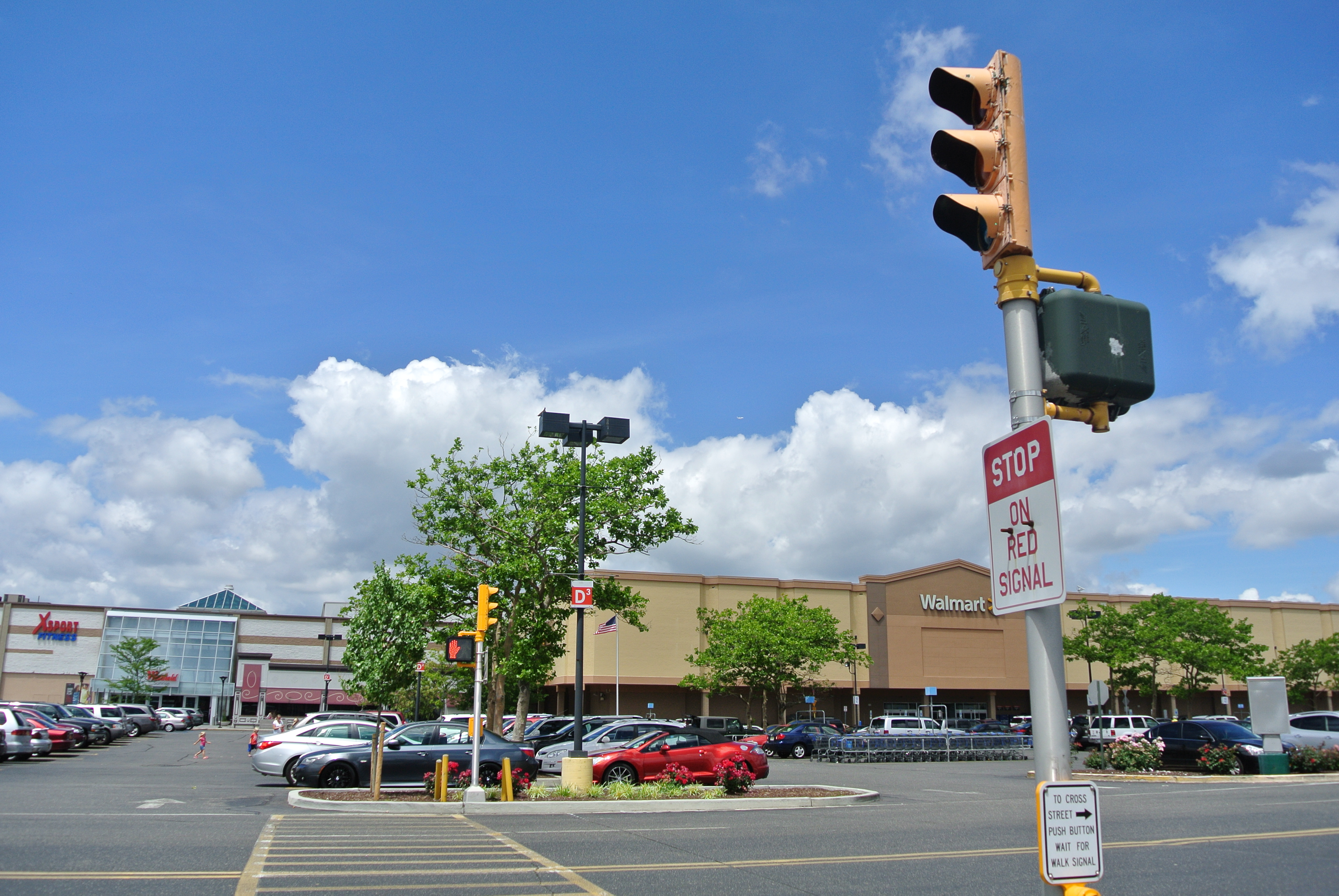
The Sunrise Mall in 2014

East Massapequa was home to the Sunrise Mall. It was announced in 2022 that the mall would not be renewing leases, and that it would close. The mall was finally closed in April, 2025.

A bedroom community of New York City, the CDP is primarily residential in character, with the majority of areas zoned for residential uses consisting of single-family homes.

== Government ==
As East Massapequa is an unincorporated hamlet within the Town of Oyster Bay, it is governed through said Town.

=== Representation in higher government ===
==== County representation ====
East Massapequa is located in Nassau County's 19th Legislative district, which as of December 2024 is represented in the Nassau County Legislature by James D. Kennedy (R–Massapequa).

==== New York State representation ====
===== New York State Assembly =====
East Massapequa is located in the New York State Assembly's 9th and 11th State Assembly districts, which as of December 2024 are represented by Michael Durso (R–Massapequa Park) and Kimberly Jean-Pierre (D–Wheatley Heights), respectively.

===== New York State Senate =====
East Massapequa is located in the New York State Senate's 5th State Senate district, which as of December 2024 is represented by Steven Rhoads (R–Bellmore).

==== Federal representation ====
===== United States Congress =====
East Massapequa is located in New York's 2nd congressional district, which as of December 2024 is represented in the United States Congress by Andrew R. Garbarino (R–Bayport).

===== United States Senate =====
Like the rest of New York, East Massapequa is represented in the United States Senate by Charles E. Schumer (D) and Kirsten Gillibrand (D).

=== Politics ===
In the 2024 U.S. presidential election, the majority of East Massapequa voters voted for Donald J. Trump (R).

== Education ==
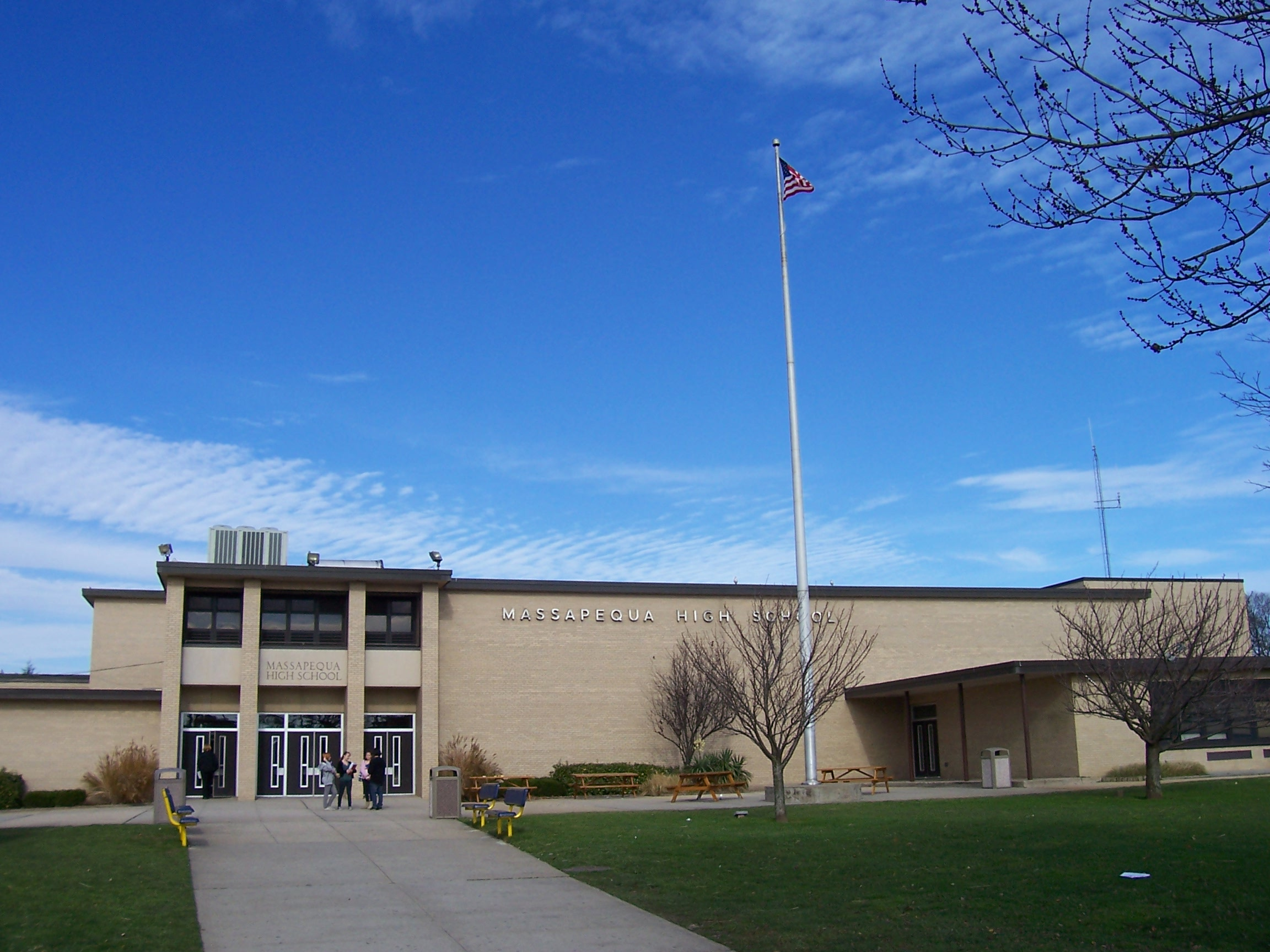
Massapequa High School in 2009

East Massapequa is served by the Amityville Union Free School District, the Farmingdale Union Free School District, and the Massapequa Union Free School District. Children who reside within the hamlet and attend public schools go to school in one of these three districts, depending on where they live within East Massapequa.

Massapequa High School and Alfred G. Berner Middle School are both located within East Massapequa.

== Notable people ==
- Kelvin Mercer – Rapper and producer; Posdnuos in the hip hop group De La Soul.
- A.J. Price – Former NBA basketball player; attended Amityville Memorial High School.
- Will Rogers – Entertainer and humorist.

== See also ==
- List of Census-designated places in New York
- North Massapequa, New York
