= List of killings by law enforcement officers in the United States, August 2011 =

This is a list of people reported killed by non-military law enforcement officers in the United States in August 2011, whether in the line of duty or not, and regardless of reason or method. The listing documents the occurrence of a death, making no implications regarding wrongdoing or justification on the part of the person killed or officer involved. Killings are arranged by date of the incident that caused death. Different death dates, if known, are noted in the description. The table below lists 48 people.

== August 2011 ==
Date	Name (Age) of Deceased		State (city)	Description
2011-08-31	Ernest Vassell (56)	Black	Florida (North Miami Beach)	
2011-08-31	Michael Ray Rosser (45)	White	West Virginia (Fairmont)	
2011-08-30	Nicholas A. Koscielniak (27)	Race unspecified	New York (Lancaster)	Nine officers hogtied Koscielniak, pinned him to the ground and tasered him twelve times in a row in an attempted to subdue him. The coroner attributed his death to cocaine use, heart disease, and "excited delirium".
2011-08-30	Michael Marquez (31)	Hispanic/Latino	New Mexico (Albuquerque)	
2011-08-29	Kurt Doerbecker (23)	White	New York (Point Lookout)	Shot after refusing to drop his knife and approaching police in a threatening manner. Police were responding to reports of a disturbance at a bar.
2011-08-28	William Paul Hill (45)	White	Florida (DeLand)	
2011-08-28	Brian Cayce Butala (31)	White	Minnesota (Duluth)	
2011-08-27	Laura J. Pettey (50)	White	New York (Watertown)	
2011-08-26	Samuel Dohn Boyd (51)	Race unspecified	California (Bakersfield)	
2011-08-26	Obbie Lee Shepard Jr. (21)	Black	Ohio (Columbus)	
2011-08-26	Ismael Lopez (29)	Hispanic/Latino	California (Long Beach)	
2011-08-26	Maurice Shephard (55)	Black	California (Los Angeles)	
2011-08-25	Keith Thomas Shumway (20)	White	New York (Ithaca)	Shot after attacking and grabbing an officer's gun. Another officer told the assailant to drop the gun. Shumway instead pointed the gun at the other officer who then shot him.
2011-08-25	Jeffrey Ferrigan (50)	White	Illinois (Lockport)	
2011-08-25	Cleodus Castleberry (23)	Black	Arkansas (Sherwood)	
2011-08-25	Jonathan David Hess (31)	White	Minnesota (Mankato)	
2011-08-24	Carlos Roberto Laboy (26)	Hispanic/Latino	Florida (Tampa)	
2011-08-24	Michael Wade Evans (56)	Race unspecified	North Carolina (Fayetteville)	
2011-08-24	Francis Owens (21)	Black	Ohio (Columbus)	
2011-08-23	Reginald E. Miller (47)	White	Texas (Fort Worth)	
2011-08-22	David Gardner (50)	Race unspecified	California (Costa Mesa)	
2011-08-21	Drew Randolph Pozdol (26)	White	Florida (Miami)	
2011-08-21	Montaleto McKissick (37)	Black	Oklahoma (Oklahoma City)	
2011-08-21	Wyatt Earp Robinson (33)	Black	District of Columbia (Washington)	
2011-08-20	Gabriel Carlos Jaramillo (21)	Hispanic/Latino	Arizona (Phoenix)	
2011-08-20	Peter Ray Bassett (41)	Race unspecified	California (Garden Grove)	
2011-08-18	Phillip A. Trimble (38)	Race unspecified	Arizona (Mesa)	
2011-08-12	Ronald Delonte Royal (20)	Black	Maryland (Clinton)	
2011-08-12	Wesley Sylvester Moore (49)	Black	Florida (Orlando)	
2011-08-12	Catawaba Tequila Howard (32)	Black	Florida (Miami)	
2011-08-12	Ray Glass (68)	Black	Georgia (DeKalb County)	Shot by SWAT team during standoff. The man had shot at a neighbor who called police. As the police arrived, the man shot at them, then barricaded himself inside his home.
2011-08-11	Boone, Jacob (30)		Arizona (Mesa)	
2011-08-11	Arthur Hayse (40)	Black	Georgia (Conyers)	Died from injuries after being struck by police cruiser. Officers were chasing Hayse and another person as prime suspects in a recent bank robbery.
2011-08-10	David Gary Albrecht (22)	White	Washington (Shoreline)	Shot after refusing to drop knife and shotgun. Police were responding to report of suicidal person.
2011-08-10	Jimmy Edgar Allen (31)	Black	Georgia (Atlanta)	Shot after turning toward police officer during armed robbery of restaurant. After being wounded, Allen fled outside the restaurant were the officer fired at least seven more times.
2011-08-08	Dennis Glenn (47)	White	Texas (Spring)	
2011-08-06	David Jerome Maestas (33)	Hispanic/Latino	Colorado (Denver)	Shot while fleeing in stolen vehicle the scene of Home Invasion. Maestas had tied up and beat the occupants, before stealing their Jeep. Police tracked the vehicle and attempted to stop it. When Maestas attempted to drive towards one of the officers, the police shot and killed him.
2011-08-05	Francis Howard Morrell (71)	White	Florida (Cape Canaveral)	
2011-08-03	Vivian Elmo (41)	Black	Colorado (Colorado Springs)	Died in auto accident when off-duty sheriff's deputy ran a red light striking Elmo's vehicle. The deputy had two prior reckless driving convictions and was fired on September 23, 2011.
2011-08-01	Richard Lee Shafer (60)	Race unspecified	Oregon (Elgin)	Shot while holding a rifle. Police were responding to a report of domestic violence.
2011-08-01	Johntwa E. Bosley (21)	Black	Ohio (Columbus)	Shot after having a said shootout with police while holding a pistol and attempting to escape in a car. Swat team shot and killed the wanted felon.
2011-08-01	Carl Maggiorini Jr. (39)	White	California (Fresno)	Shot by a Fresno Police officer when the officer saw him running down the street waving a knife and chasing a man.
2011-08-01	Robert Sean "Bobby" Clifford (33)	White	California (Granite Bay)	
2011-08-01	Earl Joseph Prater (42)	White	Kentucky (Jackson)	
2011-08-01	Johntwa E. Bosley (21)	Black	Ohio (Columbus)	
2011-08-01	Jamal Joseph Freeman (19)	Black	Texas (Kilgore)	
2011-08-01	Richard W. North (50)	White	Indiana (Bloomington)	
2011-08-01	Fallon Rae Blanchette Frederick (30)	White	Arkansas (Rogers)	

== See also ==
- Death in custody § United States
- Henry A. Wallace Police Crime Public Database
- List of cases of police brutality
- List of countries with annual rates and counts for killings by law enforcement officers
- List of law enforcement officers killed in the line of duty in the United States
- List of law enforcement officers convicted for an on-duty killing in the United States
- List of shootings by US immigration agents
- List of police reforms related to the George Floyd protests
- List of unarmed African Americans killed by law enforcement officers in the United States
- Lists of killings by law enforcement officers
- Police brutality in the United States
- Police misconduct § United States
- Police riot § United States
- Police use of deadly force in the United States
