= List of killings by law enforcement officers in the United States, 2008 =

This is a list of people reported killed by non-military law enforcement officers in the United States in 2008, whether in the line of duty or not, and regardless of reason or method. The listing documents the occurrence of a death, making no implications regarding wrongdoing or justification on the part of the person killed or officer involved. Killings are arranged by date of the incident that caused death. Different death dates, if known, are noted in the description. The table below lists 113 people.

== 2008 ==
Date	Name (age) of deceased	Race	State (city)	Description
2008-12-28	John Konaha (25)		Wisconsin (Milwaukee)	Konaha allegedly fired shots at police and was killed by a police officer.
2008-12-27	Vaughn R. Sanderson		Oregon (Grants Pass)	Shot after allegedly attempting following a chase. The trooper had attempted to pull Colbert over on suspicion of driving a stolen van when the chase began.
2008-12-23	Manuel Benitez (39)	Latino	California (El Monte)	
2008-12-17	Damany Kesler (23)		Georgia (Stockbridge)	Shot after shooting at police. Police were pursuing Kesler after he had allegedly stolen a motorcycle at gunpoint.
2008-12-19	Pierre George		Georgia (Atlanta)	Shot while attempting to run. Police were responding to citizen report of armed kidnapping by George. An officer cornered George in his vehicle at which point George attempted to flee on foot. George was not armed and the person making the report was jailed, accused of causing the killing by making a false report.
2008-12-17	Victor Tejeda (17)	Latino	California (Pomona)	
2008-12-05	Omar Hurtado (23)	Latino	California (Florence)	
2008-11-30	Salvador Alarcon (18)	Latino	California (East Los Angeles)	
2008‑11‑17	Lawrence Allen (20)		Pennsylvania (Philadelphia)	Shot to death by off-duty officer Chauncey Ellison Sr. who was accompanied by his girlfriend, off-duty officer Robin Fortune. The officers had driven around Allen's neighborhood looking for a person who had stolen a pizza from their two sons. During an altercation in front of Allen's home, Ellison shot Allen in the back, leaving him paralyzed. He died three months later. Ellison and Fortune were fired in 2010, and in 2014 they were found guilty of reckless endangerment and sentenced to 11 1/2 to 23 months in prison.
2008-11-17	Omar Garcia (24)	Latino	California (West Covina)	
2008-11-11	Dontaze Storey (29)	Black	California (Koreatown)	
2008-11-08	Ahmad Hicks (28)		Illinois (Chicago)	Hicks was shot multiple times by a police officer. He was allegedly armed.
2008‑11‑08	Dustin Willard (31)		Washington (Everett)	Shot after refusing to put down firearm. Police were responding to report of a burglary-in-progress.
2008-11-08	Alejandro Erazo (25)	Latino	California (Venice)	
2008‑11‑08	James Willingham		Michigan (Detroit)	Killed after a high-speed state trooper chase. According to reports, Troopers "violated their own high-speed chase regulations and should have been considered criminally liable for the deaths of the two Detroit men." In addition, Troopers arrested a reporter on scene who was trying to cover the incident and claimed she "interfered at the scene of a fatal traffic accident that followed a police chase."
2008‑11‑08	Jeffrey Frazier		Michigan (Detroit)	Killed after a high-speed state trooper chase. According to reports, Troopers "violated their own high-speed chase regulations and should have been considered criminally liable for the deaths of the two Detroit men." In addition, Troopers arrested a reporter on scene who was trying to cover the incident and claimed she "interfered at the scene of a fatal traffic accident that followed a police chase."
2008-10-29	Julian C. Alexander (20)		California (Anaheim)	Shot after mistaken identity. Police were chasing four burglary suspects in the neighborhood, Alexander came out of his home holding a broomstick to investigate a noise. Mistaken for one of the juvenile suspects and shot twice in the chest. Shooting officer was Kevin Flanagan.
2008-10-27	Joshua Maravilla (20)	White	California (Compton)	
2008-10-27	Larnester Hull (34)		Illinois (Chicago)	Shot in the back of the head by an off-duty officer who lived on the same block as Hull.
2008-10-18	Homer Taylor (39)		Illinois (Chicago)	After threatening officers with a "homemade knife", Taylor was tasered and stopped breathing soon after.
2008-10-17	Cole Berardi (10)		Texas (Dallas)	Sr. Cpl. Michael Vaughn hit Cole Berardi with his squad car
2008-10-??	Darson Rekemesik		Guam (Dededo)	
2008-09-20	Shawn M. Roe (36)		Washington (Blyn)	Shot during shootout with deputies. Roe was prime suspect in recent murder of a Forest Service officer and a civilian.
2008-09-19	Tyrone Dandridge (20)		Illinois (Chicago)	Officer Rene Duran and Kolodziejski shot and killed Dandridge. Dandridge's brother said he was restraining his brother on the couch when Duran and officer Kolodziejski entered the home. Duran said "step back" and then shot Dandridge in the back.
2008-09-19	Gabriel Bitterman (23)		Nebraska (Lincoln)	Died shortly after being tasered after officers responded to a domestic disturbance. Incidentally, an MTV camera crew was present during the incident.
2008-10-18	Abraham Sanchez (33)	Latino	California (Lynwood)	
2008-10-01	Joshua Stephenson (25)	Unknown	California (Rosemead)	
2008-09-16	Marvin Williams (17)		Illinois (Chicago)	Police shot and killed Williams when he allegedly confronted them with a handgun. Williams' family refuted the police account and said the teen had his arms raised when he was shot.
2008-09-15	Anthony Marchan (9)		Illinois (Chicago)	Both were shot to death by off-duty cop Dannie Marchan, who then turned the gun on himself.
2008-09-15	Alizay Marchan		Illinois (Chicago)	Both were shot to death by off-duty cop Dannie Marchan, who then turned the gun on himself.
2008-09-07	Marcus Sukow		U.S. Virgin Islands (Saint Thomas)	An off-duty ATF agent shot Sukow during a disturbance at an apartment. The agent was charged with murder but the charges were dropped because prosecutors failed to prove Sukow was the one who died.
2008-08-31	Eddie Franco (56)	Latino	California (Inglewood)	
2008-08-25	Michael Norton (29)		Maine (South Portland)	
2008-08-25	Jeffrey Miller (37)		Illinois (Chicago)	Police shot and killed Miller while he was running away from a stolen vehicle. He was allegedly armed.
2008-08-22	Martinez Winford (16)		Illinois (Chicago)	Winford was shot dead by Officer Zachary Rubald when he allegedly aimed a gun at officers. A wrongful death lawsuit challenged the officers' account of the shooting, including their statement that Winford had the gun his right hand, even though he was left-handed.
2008-08-17	Marcus Landrum (18)		Illinois (Chicago)	Police were responding to reports of a burglary when they shot Landrum, who was allegedly armed but was running away. It was later discovered there was no burglary.
2008-08-10	Gerardo Arvallo (32)	Latino	California (Lynwood)	
2008-08-05	Brandon Teague (25)		Illinois (Chicago)	SWAT officers shot and killed Brandon Teague after he allegedly shot at police on the South Side. Police said they'd approached Teague at about 10:30 p.m. because they thought he looked suspicious. According to police, Teague opened fire, hitting an officer's shoe. Teague then ran into a nearby gangway, and SWAT was summoned. Teague allegedly fired at officers and at a police helicopter. Police said a SWAT officer was hit in his protective vest. At about 12:30 a.m., the officers shot Teague.
2008-08-05	Eric Liebowitz (35)	White	California (Encino)	
2008-08-04	Johnathan Sullivan (34)		Maine (Albion)	Shot while wielding a shotgun during confrontation with police. Officers were responding to report of domestic violence disturbance.
2008-07-31	Jesse Moore (56)	Black	California (Los Angeles)	
2008-07-30	unnamed man		Washington (Mountlake Terrace)	Shot after leaning out a window with a firearm. Officers were responding to report of gunshots.
2008-07-23	Christian Portillo (34)	Latino	California (Lennox)	
2008-07-21	Kevin Wicks (38)	Black	California (Inglewood)	
2008-07-18	Robert Hill (35)		Michigan (Detroit)	According to reports, Hill "rode his bicycle to an apartment building in Detroit and was rammed by a police car into another vehicle."
2008-07-16	William Spradling (24)		Arkansas (Little Rock)	Shot by officers after allegedly pointing a gun at them. They were investigating a burglary.
2008-07-15	Montellis Clark		Georgia (Atlanta)	Shot after shooting at police. Officers approached three burglary suspects in front of a home when one began shooting at them.
2008-07-06	unidentified ma (25)	Hispanic	Illinois (Chicago)	Shot and killed when he allegedly shot at them.
2008-07-01	Shelton Bell Jr. (16)		Michigan (Detroit)	According to reports, Bell was "shot to death by an off-duty cop after allegedly demanding the keys to the cop's car at a gas station on the west side, then running when the cop pulled his gun. The autopsy report shows that Bell, Jr. was shot ten times, five in the chest, three in the back, once in the head behind his right ear, and once in his left arm."
2008-07-01	Ruben Ortega (23)	Black	California (Inglewood)	
2008-06-26	Bryan Moore (26)	Black	California (Compton)	
2008-06-24	Kelly Wark		Utah (Lehi)	Shot after shooting officer twice in head. Police had pulled her vehicle over after gas station attendant reported that she seemed generally impaired.
2008-06-22	Luis Colon (18)		Illinois (Chicago)	Witnesses said that Colon had a gun, but was attempting to surrender when he was shot.
2008-06-22	Shapell Terrell (39)		Illinois (Chicago)	According to police, the officers responded to a report of shots fired, but neighbors said all they heard were fireworks. According to witnesses, Terrell turned to go back inside his home at 1 a.m. Witness said the officers shined a spotlight on Terrell, told him to turn around and then opened fire when he didn't. Terrell was shot 14 times in the back.
2008-06-22	Darius Nicholson (49)		Illinois (Chicago)	Nicholson was shot dead in a bedroom. Police were responding to domestic report.
2008-06-15	Reginald Knight (26)		Illinois (Chicago)	Witnesses said that Knight had both hands on a fence and was talking to an officer in front of him when Brown opened fire from behind him. Witnesses also said that the officers gave high-fives to each other as they stood over Knight's body.
2008-06-14	Devon "D-Mack" Young (26)		Illinois (Chicago)	Neighbors said that Young was shot in the back execution style, while kneeling with his hands in the air shouting "don't shoot, don't shoot—I ain't got nothing." Witnesses said that officers "slapped palms" after killing Young and told each other "Good job."
2008-06-14	John R. Crosby		Massachusetts (Dedham)	Was shot by two police officers when, after a 45-minute standoff, he charged them with a knife.
2008-06-10	Ilda Grasso (52)	Latina	California (Alhambra)	
2008-06-09	Leonel Maldonado Gonzalez		Washington (Othello)	Died after being struck by vehicle driven by deputy. The deputy was following two cars when one car swerved sharply to left into the lane of an oncoming vehicle. The deputy saw something dark in his lane but could not avoid hitting Gonzalez.
2008-06-09	Linda Yancey (44)		Georgia (Stone Mountain)	Shot by sheriff's Deputy Derrick Yancey who staged a murder-robbery of his wife and claimed to have killed the robber. Instead, the deputy was himself found guilty of murdering both his wife Yancey and the day laborer Cax-Puluc.
2008-06-09	Marcial Cax-Puluc (23)		Georgia (Stone Mountain)	Shot by sheriff's Deputy Derrick Yancey who staged a murder-robbery of his wife and claimed to have killed the robber. Instead, the deputy was himself found guilty of murdering both his wife Yancey and the day laborer Cax-Puluc.
2008-06-05	Tyrone Brown		Maryland (Mount Vernon)	Brown, a former Marine, was shot by officer, Gahiji Tshamba, after he groped a woman's buttocks. Tshamba was found to be under the influence of alcohol during the shooting, and shot Brown because he was a much larger man. Tshamba never identified himself as an officer.
2008-06	Tommie Staples Jr.		Michigan (Detroit)	Staples was unarmed and shot by Steven Kopp and Barron Townsend. Townsend was also involved in the killing of Dennis Crawford with another officer Laron York, in 2004 which had led to a federal settlement. In the killing of Staples they "chased him down an alley in retaliation for the role he and his wife Jacquelyn Porter played as advocates for neighborhood children stopped by police." The federal lawsuit was reported as "settled for $2.5 million" in 2010.
2008-05-30	Alex J. Culley		California (San Diego)	Shot by San Diego Police Officer Javier Carranza after brandishing what appeared to be a handgun following a domestic disturbance and attempted armed robbery. The gun was later identified as a Black Marksman Repeater BB gun.
2008-05-20	Frank Alejo (28)	Latino	California (Boyle Heights)	
2008-05-19	Sergio Rosas (41)		California (Fresno)	A Fresno County sheriff's deputy responding to a 911 hang-up call about 10 pm, went to the intersection of Cedar and Central Avenues. He approached a parked vehicle and Rosas exited with a knife and advanced toward the deputy. The deputy shot and killed Rosas.
2008-05-18	Antonio Dampier (26)		Illinois (Chicago)	Dampier was arrested following reports of a domestic disturbance. Police claimed that he fell out of the back of a stationary police wagon and hit his head while trying to escape. However, this has been disputed, and some believe he was beaten to death by police.
2008-05-17	Carlos Rivera (17)	Latino	California (South Park)	
2008-05-17	Roketi Mosesue (46)	Pacific Islander	California (Long Beach)	
2008-05-13	Glenn Rose (25)	White	California (Covina)	
2008-05-13	Samuel Om (21)	Asian	California (Koreatown)	
2008-05-13	Jason Spoor		Oregon (Portland)	
2008-05-12	Douglas Kelley (40)		Maine (Indian Township)	
2008-05-11	Michael Byoune (19)	Black	California (Inglewood)	
2008-05-06	Aaren Gwinn (21)		Illinois (North Chicago)	Gwinn was shot after he attempting to drive away from officers. Gwinn was unarmed.
2008-05-03	Albert Kittrel (48)		Maine (Portland)	
2008-05-02	Marco Gomez (31)	Latino	California (Central-Alameda)	
2008-04-26	Antoine Covington (18)		Illinois (Chicago)	Officers responded to a 911 call about two men with guns inside a store. When the men exited the store, one of them allegedly fired at the officers. One of the men, Covinton, was killed, and the other was wounded.
2008-04-26	Rigoberto Lopez (24)		Illinois (Chicago)	Lopez died after he allegedly fired shots at officers, who fired back. Lopez died at the scene.
2008-04-25	David Duncan Clark		Washington (Bellingham)	Shot after brandishing what appeared to be a handgun. Police were responding to a report of disorderly conduct. The gun was found to be a toy.
2008-04-22	Darren Tufts (41)		Vermont (Bradford)	
2008-04-19	Richard Dale (54)	White	California (Torrance)	
2008-04-16	Jesse Carrizales (17)		California (Fresno)	At Roosevelt High School (Fresno, California) student Jesse Carrizales was shot and killed by a campus Police Officer. Carrizales had hit the officer with a bat and was standing over him, yelling and threatening. When the officer fell he had lost his weapon, but while on the ground he pulled his backup weapon and fired once or twice, hitting Carrizales in the chest. Carrizales died at the scene.
2008-04-12	Fernando Cortez (21)	Latino	California (Watts)	
2008-04-11	Jonathan Taylor (24)	Black	California (El Segunda)	
2008-04-02	David Sedillo (26)	Latino	California (Wilmington)	
2008-03-31	Daniel Gonzalez (28)	Latino	California (Glendale)	
2008-03-28	Jesse Miller		Missouri (Marionville)	Miller had his car break down and fatally shot a man who had apparently came to his help. As a police officer arrived at the scene, Miller opened fire on him, missing him, and was shot by the officer. Miller was the son of Frazier Glenn Cross, the Neo-Nazi perpetrator of the Overland Park Jewish Community Center shooting.
2008-03-25	Mohammad Usman Chaudhry (21)	Asian	California (Hollywood)	
2008-03-15	Rodney Sandberg (24)	White	California (Torrance)	
2008-03-13	Marco Avila (33)	Latino	California (Wilmington)	
2008-03-12	Sergio Rojas (21)	Latino	California (East Los Angeles)	
2008-03-05	Ryan Gonzalez (26)	Latino	California (Fairfax)	
2008-03-04	Lawrence Smith (24)	Black	California (North Hollywood)	
2008-03-01	Maurice Cox (38)	Black	California (Hyde Park)	
2008-02-29	Carlos Arevalo (22)	Latino	California (Cypress Park)	
2008-02-27	Bryon San Jose (25)	Latino	California (Van Nuys)	
2008-02-21	Daniel Leon (22)	Latino	California (Glassell Park)	
2008-02-16	Juan Carlos Castillo-Maldonado (22)	Latino	California (West Lake)	
2008-02-12	Nicholas Hunter (20)		Wisconsin (Milwaukee)	Hunter was shot and killed by police, who claimed he fired at them first after being asked to stop walking in the road. Two officers fired 19 shots at him.
2008-02-08	Ariel Perez (21)	Latino	California (Long Beach)	
2008-02-07	Edwin Rivera (20)	Latino	California (Winnetka)	
2008-02-07	Antoine Cantrell		Georgia (College Park)	Shot while being arrested. Police were responding to report of man making threats. Cantrell had fled from police who caught him after a foot chase. The officer reports that he was trying to arrest Cantrell when the gun fired.
2008-02–06	Schaub Geoffrey		Florida (Orange County)	Deputies from the Orange County Sheriff's Office were performing surveillance outside of Schaub's home because he was suspected of molesting a 7-year-old boy. He was shot after he pointed a flare gun covered in cloth at the deputies
2008-02-03	unnamed man		Washington (Tacoma)	Shot after pointing gun at officers. Police were responding to report of domestic violence. During 6-hour standoff with SWAT team man threatened to shoot officers and himself.
2008-02-02	Roberto Gonzalez (37)		Illinois (Chicago)	Died after being tasered.
2008-02-02	Philmore Wilkins (49)		Illinois (Chicago)	Wilkins was shot to death by three officers after a hostage situation.
2008-01-29	Ronald Boone (20)	Black	California (Hyde Park)	
2008-01-04	Glen Boldware (47)	Black	California (Sawtelle)	
2008-01-04	Tarika Wilson (26)		Ohio (Lima)	Killed during SWAT raid of her rented home. SWAT was there to apprehend Anthony Terry on suspicion of drug trafficking. Police opened fire killing Ms. Wilson and injuring her 14 month old son.
2008-01-02	Kelvin Poke		Maryland (Laurel)	Shot during shootout with police. Poke was an inmate who escaped from a hospital after overpowering guards and stealing two guns. He hijacked two cars and was cornered when the shootout occurred.
2008	Joseph Lumpkin		Florida (Miami)	Lumpkin was being pursued by the Miami-Dade Police Department because of him being suspected in a shoplifting. Lumpkin struggled for the officer's gun and was shot.

== See also ==
- Death in custody § United States
- Henry A. Wallace Police Crime Public Database
- List of cases of police brutality
- List of countries with annual rates and counts for killings by law enforcement officers
- List of law enforcement officers killed in the line of duty in the United States
- List of law enforcement officers convicted for an on-duty killing in the United States
- List of police reforms related to the George Floyd protests
- List of unarmed African Americans killed by law enforcement officers in the United States
- Lists of killings by law enforcement officers
- Police brutality in the United States
- Police misconduct § United States
- Police riot § United States
- Police use of deadly force in the United States
