= List of killings by law enforcement officers in the United States, June 2014 =

This is a list of people reported killed by non-military law enforcement officers in the United States in June 2014, whether in the line of duty or not, and regardless of reason or method. The listing documents the occurrence of a death, making no implications regarding wrongdoing or justification on the part of the person killed or officer involved. Killings are arranged by date of the incident that caused death. Different death dates, if known, are noted in the description. The table below lists 92 people.

== June 2014 ==
Date	Name (age) of deceased	Race	State (city)	Description
2014-06-30	Oscar Perez Giron (23)	Hispanic	Washington (Seattle)	
2014-06-29	John Omar DelValle (44)	Hispanic	New Jersey (Elizabeth)	DelValle was allegedly threatening a woman with a knife outside an apartment building and shot dead by officers.
2014-06-29	Paul Matthew Edmundson (43)	White	Washington (Centralia)	Edmunson suspected of stealing from restaurant nearby attempted to pull gun on officer with his K-9 partner, K-9 subdued Edmunson allowing the officer to draw first on him, eventually Edmunson was able to pull a pistol from his coat and was fatally shot by the officer.
2014-06-27	Michael Huffman (56)	White	Virginia (Damascus)	
2014-06-27	Nyocomus Garnett (35)	Black	Texas (Midland)	
2014-06-27	Aaron Wright (32)	White	Washington (Kennewick)	
2014-06-27	Paul Ray Kemp Jr. (40)	Black	California (Inglewood)	An unarmed black man was fatally shot and/or tasered several times in the back. A lawsuit alleges he was not a threat to officers.
2014-06-27	Andres Morales (27)	Black	New York (Bay Shore)	Jumped out of a stopped car from the passenger side in a traffic stop. Initiated a foot pursuit with officers, and was later shot after pulling out a revolver.
2014-06-26	David J. Kingsbury (34)	White	Massachusetts (Springfield)	
2014-06-26	Dominic Graffeo (56)	White	Massachusetts (Chelsea)	
2014-06-26	Michael Berry (50)	White	Texas (Sweetwater)	Police were attempting to serve a warrant on Berry for allegedly stealing a loader from a scrap recycling business. Berry locked himself in his mobile home, and waved a firearm in a threatening manner from the back door. A SWAT team and bomb squad from Abilene were called in to assist. Tear gas was launched into the trailer, but Berry opened fire. The SWAT officers returned fire, killing him.
2014-06-26	Rodney Hodge (33)	Black	Texas (Dallas)	Police responded to numerous 911 calls about a man firing a gun in a neighborhood. Hodge was ordered to drop the weapon, but he kept walking forward and pointed the gun at officers.
2014-06-25	Mimi Diane Goldberg (49)	White	Nevada (Las Vegas)	LVMPD officers responded to reports of a disturbance at a hotel. Police found Goldberg stabbing another woman She was ordered to drop the knife, but she slashed one of the police car's windows. Several shots were fired.
2014-06-25	Samuel Lee Johnson (45)	Black	California (Los Angeles)	Johnson was approached by a security guard who accused him of shoplifting. Johnson then pulled out a pistol, and fired at the guard. LAPD began searching around the neighborhood for Johnson. They eventually found him, but he ran to a home. Johnson died of a gunshot wound as the officers attempted to take him into custody. The circumstances of the shooting are unknown.
2014-06-25	Dennis Hicks (29)	Black	Delaware (Magnolia)	
2014-06-25	James Jaimez (29)	White	California (Apple Valley)	
2014-06-24	Stanley Leger (80)	White	Texas (Beaumont)	
2014-06-24	Lavon King (20)	Black	New Jersey (Jersey City)	King started an altercation with a police officer and the officer shot him. The circumstances of this struggle are unknown.
2014-06-24	Antoine Dominique Hunter (24)	Black	California (Compton)	LASD deputies attempted to pull over a vehicle that was driving recklessly. A short pursuit ensued, and the driver attempted to run over one of the deputies while they were both out of their patrol car. The other deputy opened fire after witnessing the driver pull out a handgun.
2014-06-22	Juan May (45)	Black	Texas (Duncanville)	
2014-06-22	Marcus Rael (24)		Idaho (Post Falls)	Shot at a dozen officers, who fired back at him.
2014-06-22	Ray Junior Barber (45)	White	North Carolina (Greensboro)	
2014-06-21	Timothy Ray Bowling (31)	White	North Dakota (Dickinson)	
2014-06-21	John Kapeluch (54)	White	Michigan (Sterling Heights)	Police responded to a 911 call of an assault at a residence. The man was holding his wife hostage with a rifle. Officers ordered him to drop the gun, but he turned around and pointed it at an officer.
2014-06-21	Douglas M. Seaton (35)	White	Kentucky (Madisonville)	Officers attempted to initiate a traffic stop. Seaton drove away, and a vehicle pursuit followed. Seaton then exited the car with a gun in his hand. He was ordered to drop the gun, but refused. He was shot as he was approaching the officers.
2014-06-21	Jose Cardenas Beltran (22)	Hispanic	California (Sacramento)	Police responded to a 911 call about Cardenas threatening his brother with a knife. Officers ordered him to drop the knife, but he refused. A taser was initially deployed with no avail. Officers opened fire after being threatened with the knife.
2014-06-21	James Moala Kofu (22)	Native Hawaiian or Pacific Islander	California (San Bernardino)	Went up with another armed man to a police vehicle with four officers inside of it, and allegedly pointed a rifle at them.
2014-06-20	Ismael Sadiq (30)	Black	Texas (Garland)	
2014-06-20	Jason T. Van Buskirk (32)	White	Nebraska (Columbus)	Columbus Police Department officers and Nebraska state troopers responded to a domestic disturbance. The officers spotted a Dodge RAM that matched the description of the suspect's vehicle. As a felony stop was being performed, Buskirk shot at a trooper as he was approaching the passenger's side. Although shots were fired, the pickup initially sped away. The pursuit ended in Colfax County after Buskirk was shot due to him ramming three police vehicles.
2014-06-20	Ray Dakota Scholfield (23)	Native American	California (Redding)	Redding Police Department officers Jason Rhoads, Josh Tracy and Russ Veilleaux shot and killed Ray Dakota Scholfield, when he brandished a butcher's knife at them. Scholfield had just killed his cousin, Christen Clark.
2014-06-20	Royce Flournoy (50)	Black	Georgia (Atlanta)	Police responded to reports of a man banging on various doors of an apartment and yelling. As the officers were about to confront him, he pulled out a fake gun and pointed it at the officers.
2014-06-20	Denzel Curnell (19)	Black	South Carolina (Charleston)	
2014-06-20	Ernest Wayne Rials (70)	White	Texas (Hamilton)	
2014-06-19	Paul Westbrook (37)	White	California (Sacramento)	
2014-06-19	Darrell Haymon (53)	Black	North Carolina (Hope Mills)	Police responded to reports of an assault with a deadly weapon at a bank. Officers confronted Haymon, who had a knife. His wife appeared bloody and had wounds on her body. Haymon was ordered to drop the knife and to release his wife. He then raised the knife, which caused officers to open fire.
2014-06-19	Carlos Hernandez (45)	Hispanic	Texas (San Antonio)	Hernandez, a wheelchair-using man, allegedly pointed a gun at officers who were responding to a call of a 39 year old man being shot.
2014-06-19	Thomas D. Rogers (36)	White	Washington (Port Orchard)	Rogers was reportedly armed with a knife and lunged at officers, injuring two of them.
2014-06-19	William Lee Workman Jr. (32)	White	South Carolina (Horry County)	Officers were dispatched to 4365 Bayberry Drive to serve an arrest warrant to William Lee Workman, Jr., for third degree criminal sexual conduct. Investigators say the officer-involved shooting was reported to dispatch at 10:39 a.m. There are no other details at this time.
2014-06-19	Jason Carulla (17)	Hispanic	Florida (Coral Gables)	Police opened fire on Carulla, a 17-year-old runaway, when he rammed the stolen SUV he was picking up into an unmarked police car.
2014-06-16	Devaron Ricardo Wilburn (21)	Black	North Carolina (Charlotte)	Police say 21-year-old Wilburn, who was being sought as a suspect in a previous night's shooting at police officers, refused to surrender and presented a weapon before being shot.
2014-06-16	Jonathan K. Whitehead (33)	White	Washington (Seattle)	Whitehead was shot by Washington State Patrol troopers after apparently setting his truck on fire and brandishing a knife on I-5.
2014-06-16	Joshua Stand (35)	White	Oklahoma (Delaware)	
2014-06-16	John Schneider (24)	Black	Georgia (Lawrenceville)	
2014-06-15	Gregory Johnson (67)	Unknown race	California (Bakersfield)	
2014-06-15	Anthony Skyles Jr. (34)	White	Florida (Altamonte Springs)	Skyles' wife called 911 because she was worried Skyles was suicidal. When police arrived, he held a knife to his own throat and was shot by the first officer at the scene after police claimed he approached them. Skyles' wife disputed the officer's account and claimed her husband was complying with police and was not acting aggressively. Skyles was disabled.
2014-06-15	Eric Harris (30)	Black	Maryland (Baltimore)	
2014-06-14	Jason A. Moore (40)	White	Illinois (East Peoria)	
2014-06-14	Jason Harrison (38)	Black	Texas (Oak Cliff)	Police say Jason Harrison walked out of the door Saturday armed with a screwdriver. The two responding officers said they fired at the 38-year-old mentally ill man when he refused to drop the screwdriver despite orders to do so and then charged at them. The family filed a lawsuit which was dismissed which claimed Harrison's civil rights were violated and he posed no threat to police, and a grand jury declined to charge the police with a crime.
2014-06-14	Victor Hernandez (21)	Hispanic	Colorado (Greeley)	Victor Daniel Hernandez pointed a handgun at the officers as they responded to a report of a "crazy guy with a gun" at a Greeley hotel in the early morning hours of June 14. Hernandez was shot three times by the officers. Hernandez earlier that morning had fled a disturbance at a Greeley bar before police arrived. Just before he was shot, the office says Hernandez assaulted his girlfriend. Before he was shot, Hernandez told one of the officers, "I am out on bond and I am not going back to jail."
2014-06-13	Frank Rhodes (61)	Black	Mississippi (Gulfport)	Gulfport Police officers were responding to a shots fired call in the 12400 block of Holliman Circle in Gulfport just after 10 p.m. when they found 61-year-old Frank Rhodes standing outside on the driveway of the house. A preliminary investigation shows Rhodes fired shots at the officers and the officers returned fire.
2014-06-13	Anthony Gustave Nelson (40)	White	Nevada (Reno)	A suspect in a Tucson homicide was shot to death by deputies in Nevada after he killed two women near Reno, law enforcement officials said. Anthony Gustave Nelson, 40, was killed June 13 in a shootout with officers in Nevada.
2014-06-13	Joe Hernandez (17)	Hispanic	Texas (Fort Worth)	
2014-06-12	Nicholas Glendon Davis (23)	White	Oregon (Portland)	
2014-06-12	Travis Blake Utley (38)	White	Oregon (Milwaukie)	
2014-06-12	Timothy Hill (18)	White	West Virginia (Princeton)	A West Virginia state trooper says he caught teenagers in his driveway tampering with his cruiser. When he found them and confronted them, he says Hill became combative and attempted to disarm him. The trooper shot Hill twice, killing him on the scene. Hill's mother said the trooper had a personal history with her son and targeted him.
2014-06-12	Larry Allan Jerrils (58)	White	Louisiana (Bossier)	Police responded to a silent alarm at a Payless Shoe Source store. They say that when they arrived they found 58-year-old Larry Allen Jerrils, who had just robbed the store. Jerrils ran from officers and went behind a building. He then turned and brandished a firearm when they approached. The officers opened fire, killing Jerrils. He was pronounced dead at the scene.
2014-06-11	Miguel Moreno Torrez (22)	Hispanic	California (Fresno)	On June 11, 2014, Miguel Moreno Torrez and his brother got into a fight at their Fresno home and a roommate called 911. The responding Fresno Police officers say Miguel Torrez had a knife. Some witnesses say neither brother had a knife. When Miguel Moreno Torrez did not comply with officers' commands, he was shot about fifteen times, killing him. The family has filed a lawsuit.
2014-06-11	Ryan Marone (37)	White	Nevada (Henderson)	
2014-06-11	Steven Kellog Neuroth (55)	Unknown race	California (Willits)	
2014-06-10	Earl Cranston Harris (73)	White	Oregon (Ashland)	
2014-06-10	Broderick Johnson (21)	Black	Georgia (Chamblee)	Police said 21-year-old Broderick Johnson barged into the Autozone brandishing a weapon and ordered the manager to tie up the workers and to open the safe. One worker escaped and call 911. SWAT was called in but Johnson came out of the building as they were setting up a perimeter. Police gave him verbal commands to get on the ground which he refused. A struggle ensued and an officer shot and fatally wounded Johnson.
2014-06-10	Carlos Nicolás Sandoval de Jesús (22)	Hispanic	Puerto Rico (Guaynabo)	An officer shot Sandoval de Jesús while driving home after a minor collision. The officer was charged with murder.
2014-06-10	John Thomas (25)	White	Missouri (Cassville)	
2014-06-10	Michael V. Gutierrez (31)	Hispanic	California (Colton)	
2014-06-09	Roc Eugene LaRue (43)	White	Oklahoma (Oklahoma City)	Police pursued individual in stolen vehicle who repeatedly ignored commands to pull over, finally stopping near NW 61st and Shawnee. That is when police said LaRue got out with a large knife in his hands. Oklahoma City Police said he ignored commands to put down his weapon and surrender so they used Tasers on him. They said they were ineffective and they then used a bean bag shotgun to try to slow him down. It also proved ineffective and they said LaRue was getting closer to officers. That's when they pulled their firearms. Police say two of their officers and one Warr Acres officer fired their guns to stop LaRue. He was taken to a local hospital where he later died.
2014-06-09	Jerad Miller (31)	White	Nevada (Las Vegas)	Jerad Miller shot three people (including two law enforcement officers) dead before an officer gunned down Jerad Miller. His partner and wife, Amanda Miller, committed suicide by gunshot.
2014-06-09	Victor Villalpando (16)	Hispanic	New Mexico (Espanola)	Possible "suicide by cop". Police say Villalpando called 911 about a suspicious person, then gave them a description of the clothes he was wearing and said the person was armed.
2014-06-09	Roylee Vell Dixon (48)	Black	Alabama (Tuscaloosa)	
2014-06-09	John D. Tilley (48)	White	Nebraska (Bellevue)	
2014-06-09	Troy Kirkpatrick (24)	White	New Mexico (Carlsbad)	
2014-06-08	Emanuel Jean-Baptiste (29)	Black	Mississippi (Moss Point)	
2014-06-07	Angela Beatrice Randolph (38)	Black	Maryland (Glen Burnie)	An MTA officer was called to a bus shelter at the Cromwell light rail station Saturday evening for a disruptive woman. Investigators say the woman began assaulting the officer, choking a female officer and pulling her hair. Several witnesses tried to intervene. The officer was able to remove her gun and fired one shot striking the suspect in the upper leg area. The suspect and the officer were taken to hospitals, and the suspect was pronounced dead.
2014-06-07	Daniel Best (34)	White	Arizona (Gilbert)	
2014-06-07	Lonnie Flemming (31)	Black	Tennessee (East Knoxville)	
2014-06-06	Kristopher Barkus (25)	White	Pennsylvania (Butler)	
2014-06-06	David Latham (35)	Black	Virginia (Norfolk)	When police arrived at the scene of a domestic situation call, an officer encountered Latham, who allegedly threatened the officer with a knife. The officer discharged his firearm and hit Latham Latham was shot nine times, with two hitting his back. On June 12, 2015, Officer Michael Edington, Jr. was indicted on the charge of voluntary manslaughter.
2014-06-06	Thomas L. White (28)	White	Idaho (Coeur d'Alene)	Officers responding to a domestic dispute call were allegedly fired upon by White. Three officers returned fire.
2014-06-06	Dennis Ronald Marx (48)	White	Georgia (Cumming)	
2014-06-06	Paul Alan L'Herault (50)	White	Colorado (Aurora)	
2014-06-05	Glen Griggs (53)	White	California (Sunnyvale)	Sunnyvale police intended to confront Griggs regarding the disappearance of his roommate and the possible connection to three other women he had known and who had died under unusual circumstances. He brandished a BB gun and officers killed him.
2014-06-05	Steven Jerold Thompson (26)	Black	Florida (Lauderhill)	Deputies tracked Thompson to an apartment, believing him to be a suspect in a robbery. After being chased through the complex by police, Thompson turned and fired at officers, who fatally shot him in return.
2014-06-04	Harold Murphy (35)	White	South Dakota (Rapid City)	The suspect attempted to run from the officer after being stopped for illegal use of an ATV, and a second officer who was on scene pursued him at a short distance. As the second officer tackled the suspect, Harold Murphy began firing a handgun he had in his possession.
2014-06-04	Thomas Dewitt Johnson (28)	Black	Florida (Jacksonville)	
2014-06-03	Yanira Serrano-Garcia (18)	Hispanic	California (Half Moon Bay)	Serrano was shot in the chest at least once outside her home by a San Mateo County Sheriff's Deputy, Menh Trieu, after she charged at him with a kitchen knife in her hand. Serrano's relatives called the police on her because she was suffering from a schizophrenic episode. In August 2014, the San Mateo County district attorney decided to not file charges against Trieu.
2014-06-02	Deborah A. McCollum (52)	White	South Carolina (Aiken)	Officers were responding to a call of someone threatening suicide, when McCollum allegedly came to the door with a gun. Deputy Christopher Salley pulled out his gun and fatally shot her. Neighbors said that McCollum's husband had recently died.
2014-06-01	Michael Kevin Kleinbeck (52)	White	Kansas (Fredonia)	Two Montgomery County officers were responding to a report of an armed individual when they shot and killed Kleinback. Police say they believe Kleinbeck was living on the property in a camper or trailer.
2014-06-04	Kristopher Chase Simmons (35)	White	Utah (Marriott-Slaterville)	
2014-06-04	Lawrence H. Faine (72)	Black	Virginia (Norfolk)	
2014-06-04	Timothy Ronald Lloyd (56)	White	Kansas (McPherson)	
2014-06-02	Drew Marian Spencer (21)	White	North Carolina (Hickory)	
2014-06-02	Jordan Franklin Browder (22)	White	South Carolina (Piedmont)	
2014-06-02	Frank McQueen (34)	Black	Pennsylvania (Chester)	

== See also ==
- Death in custody § United States
- Henry A. Wallace Police Crime Public Database
- List of cases of police brutality
- List of countries with annual rates and counts for killings by law enforcement officers
- List of law enforcement officers killed in the line of duty in the United States
- List of law enforcement officers convicted for an on-duty killing in the United States
- List of shootings by US immigration agents
- List of police reforms related to the George Floyd protests
- List of unarmed African Americans killed by law enforcement officers in the United States
- Lists of killings by law enforcement officers
- Police brutality in the United States
- Police misconduct § United States
- Police riot § United States
- Police use of deadly force in the United States
