= List of killings by law enforcement officers in the United States, February 2010 =

This is a list of people reported killed by non-military law enforcement officers in the United States in February 2010, whether in the line of duty or not, and regardless of reason or method. The listing documents the occurrence of a death, making no implications regarding wrongdoing or justification on the part of the person killed or officer involved. Killings are arranged by date of the incident that caused death. Different death dates, if known, are noted in the description. The table below lists 30 people.

== February 2010 ==
Date	Name (Age) of Deceased	State (city)	Description
2010-02-28	Brent Ingram (39)	Colorado (Grand Junction)	Shot after charging at police with knife raised. Police were responding to report of domestic disturbance.
2010-02-26	Nathaniel Rowe (26)	Oklahoma (Tulsa)	During the course of the assault, Nathaniel Rowe attempted to take Officer Elliot's service weapon and was able to rip the Pepper spray and its holder from Officer Elliot's duty belt and repeatedly attempted to rip his service weapon away from his duty belt, according to the Tulsa Police Department. Officer Still, fearing for his life and the lives of Officer Elliot and the domestic violence victim, shot the suspect. "The man that kicked that door in - the shell was Nate; the mind wasn't," said Grace, an assault victim. "If those police officers had not been here, I wouldn't have been here to tell you this story."
2010-02-26	Jed Waits (30)	Washington (Tacoma)	Shot after shooting at deputy. Officers had pulled over Waits' vehicle as the prime suspect in a recent murder.
2010-02-25	Brian Macias (17)	California (Los Angeles)	Brian Macias, a 17-year-old Latino, was shot and killed Thursday, February 25, according to Los Angeles County coroner's records. Macias was apparently shot by his father, an off-duty LAPD reserve officer, at the family's home, authorities said. Macias allegedly confronted his father with a large object and was shot once in the chest, said authorities familiar with the case.
2010-02-25	Andy Jip Hammond (43)	Arizona (Ash Fork)	Hammond pulled a gun on employees at Stoneworld in Ash Fork, Arizona, and left in a 2 1/2 ton water truck. Responding Yavapai County Sheriff's Deputy Christopher L. Clouse located Hammond at a nearby gas station, where a brief physical confrontation ensued. Hammond pulled a .357 revolver and pointed it at Deputy Clouse, forcing the deputy to use lethal force. Hammond was dressed in full military fatigues and was wearing body armor. Several rifles and a grenade launcher were found in the water truck.
2010-02-23	Rashid Jihad Jones (25)	New Jersey (Vineland)	The man authorities believe beat his grandmother to death inside their East Chestnut Avenue apartment Tuesday afternoon was shot and killed by two city police officers when he refused to drop a baseball bat as he approached them, Cumberland County Prosecutor Jennifer Webb-McRae said.
2010-02-23	Jessica Jones (18)	Missouri (Kansas City)	The officers exited their vehicles, and Jones turned around and began to drive at the officers. The officers shot at Jones and killed her.
2010-02-23	Shawn Greenwood (29)	New York (Ithaca)	Shot by Sgt. Bryan Bangs while trying to escape from officers issuing a warrant. Officers, acting on a tip that Greenwood would be involved in an illegal drug transaction, tried to execute a search warrant. Greenwood attempted to flee with his vehicle and struck an officer. After refusing to stop and he continued to drive on towards the downed officer, lethal force was used. On July 1, 2010, a grand jury released a report clearing Bangs of wrongdoing. On July 11, 2010, Bangs' home was destroyed in a fire that was ruled to be arson; New York State Police did not officially link the two incidents, although it is widely believed that the arson was retaliation for the shooting. As of June 2013, no arrests have been made in the arson.
2010-02-20	Edward Wheaton (39)	Texas (Greenville)	Wheaton said he wanted to go get something to drink. While driving his girlfriend's unregistered pickup truck on Interstate 30, investigators claim he was recklessly weaving in and out of traffic when they tried to pull him over. Instead, Wheaton took off. The chase escalated when, authorities say, he rammed two vehicles. That's when authorities opened fire, according to witnesses, shooting 30 to 40 bullets into the truck.
2010-02-19	Nicholas Eugene Scott (23)	Florida (Sanford)	
2010-02-18	Eric Frias (24)	Texas (Haltom City / North Richland Hills)	Eric Frias, 24, had recently lost his job and had a terrible fight with his girlfriend. Initially, a junkyard owner called 911 after hearing gunfire and witnessing someone put a body into a car. Frias then fled in the car and several officers began a pursuit. Ultimately, police say, Frias pointed a weapon at the officers at which point Frias was shot by the officers.
2010-02-18	Blake Bowman (18)	Kansas (Kansas City)	Bowman, who police considered a suspect in an armed carjacking from last week, was spotted near 46th Street and Sterling Avenue Thursday. Bowman ran into his mother's house. A two-hour standoff ensued, and finally ended with Bowman coming out of the house with a knife to his mother's throat. Bowman refused to drop the knife and a sniper fatally shot him.
2010-02-17	Ryan Rashawn Davis (20)	Pennsylvania (Pittsburgh)	Officer Triolo encountered a man who matched the suspect's description—later identified as Mr. Davis—and police said he began assaulting her within seconds. She shot and killed Mr. Davis during the assault. She recovered his semi-automatic pistol at the scene, police said. An officer who arrived within minutes as her back-up said she was visibly injured, with blood on her face and a black eye.
2010-02-17	Phillipe Louis (27)	Florida (Orlando)	
2010-02-16	Howard Tucker (37)	New York (Albany)	A two-officer patrol unit attempted to pull Tucker's vehicle over, but when officers approached his vehicle on foot he sped off, causing his car to spin on the snowy road and hit a telephone pole, authorities said. Tucker then struck one of the officers and pinned him beneath the vehicle before striking an iron fence and coming to a stop with the officer beneath the vehicle. "During that sequence of events, the suspect was shot by our officers." A loaded handgun was found inside the car.
2010-02-15	Stephen Reynolds (24)	Indiana (Indianapolis)	Police said Reynolds brandished a knife and charged at an officer. Reynolds' mother had called police, claiming that her son was suicidal and that family had taken a gun from him earlier in the day. Officers initially used a stun gun to try to subdue the man inside a home, but it didn't work. Lee then shot Reynolds in the chest, police said. According to investigators, he had at least two knives.
2010-02-14	John Aguilera (35)	California (West Covina)	John Aguilera, a 35-year-old Latino, was shot and killed Sunday, February 14 by a SWAT officer from the West Covina Police Department, according to authorities. Officers found Aguilera holding a hostage at gunpoint, said authorities. The hostage was later identified as Rico Sanchez, a friend of Aguilera. The standoff lasted until 12:30 a.m. At that point, a SWAT officer from the West Covina Police Department shot Aguilera who was pronounced dead at the scene. Sanchez was unharmed.
2010-02-14	Patrick John Fischer II (27)	Maryland (Frederick)	The Frederick Police Department reported: Officers were investigating a domestic incident called in by Fischer's wife. While investigating, they received a separate call of shots fired at passing vehicles. The officers responded and made contact with Fischer, whom they believed was connected to both the domestic dispute and the shots fired call. It was later determined that in addition to the domestic assault, Fischer had shot at and struck a driver and his vehicle before the confrontation with the officers. Upon confronting Fischer, the officers found he was armed. They gave several commands for Fischer to drop his firearm. Instead, Fischer pointed the firearm at officers, and police shot at Fischer.
2010-02-13	Perry Long (40)	Tennessee (Kingsport)	Perry Long, 40, was fatally shot Saturday during a domestic violence call. Police said Long pointed a handgun at Wayt, who then shot him. The woman had been beaten.
2010-02-12	Kathleen Hoffmeister (53)	Oregon (Gresham)	Hoffmeister was shot and killed by Clackamas County deputy Sgt Jeffrey Grahn. She was a friend of Grahn's wife Charlotte Grahn (see below). Grahn was drunk and suicided after killing Hoffmeister, Charlotte Grahn and their friend Victoria Schulmerich. In 2015 the City of Gresham settled a lawsuit with the heirs of Hoffmeister for $1.6 million. The suit alleged Sheriff Craig Roberts and two of his top aides knew Grahn was dangerously unstable but failed to intervene.
2010-02-12	Victoria Schulmerich (53)	Oregon (Gresham)	Schulmerich was shot and killed by Clackamas County deputy Sgt Jeffrey Grahn. She was a friend of Grahn's wife Charlotte Grahn (see below). Grahn was drunk and suicided after killing Schulmerich, Charlotte Grahn and their friend Kathleen Hoffmeister. In 2015 the City of Gresham settled a lawsuit with the heirs of Hoffmeister for $1.6 million. The suit alleged Sheriff Craig Roberts and two of his top aides knew Grahn was dangerously unstable but failed to intervene.
2010-02-12	Charlotte Grahn (53)	Oregon (Gresham)	Grahn was shot and killed by her husband Clackamas County deputy Sgt Jeffrey Grahn. Grahn was drunk and suicided after killing Grahn and her friends Victoria Schulmerich and Kathleen Hoffmeister. In 2015 the City of Gresham settled a lawsuit with the heirs of Hoffmeister for $1.6 million. The suit alleged Sheriff Craig Roberts and two of his top aides knew Grahn was dangerously unstable but failed to intervene.
2010-02-12	Juan Castellanos (29)	California (Fresno)	A Fresno Police Detective investigating a carjacking was sitting in his unmarked car near the carjacked vehicle. Castellanos, a suspect in the carjacking walked up to the detective's car unnoticed, and pointed a shotgun at the detective's face. The startled detective shot Castellanos in the chest several times. Castellanos was declared dead at a local hospital.
2010-02-10	Sambo Sim (42)	Washington (Tacoma)	Shot by police responding to a domestic violence call after Mr. Sim allegedly fired several rounds at police.
2010-02-09	Tahir Adams (21)	New Jersey (Elizabeth)	Police were called to the 800 block of Adams Avenue around 4:30 a.m. Tuesday for a report of men breaking into cars. When police officers arrived they encountered at least two suspects inside a stolen car. The preliminary investigation thus far indicates that the vehicle made several attempts to elude the police officers’ attempt to stop them and ignored several commands to turn the car off. The vehicle crashed into a responding police car and into other vehicles and mounted the sidewalk before suddenly accelerating in reverse in the direction of officers who were on foot, approaching the vehicle. At that point several weapons were discharged. One suspect, Tahir Adams DOB: 6/27/1987 of Irvington was pronounced dead at the scene.
2010-02-08	Horace Mitchell (24)	Georgia (Stone Mountain)	Shot after firing several times at police officers, injuring one. SWAT team responded to report of domestic violence that included one gunshot wound.
2010-02-07	Kent Kramer (29)	Michigan (Sandusky)	Shot during verbal confrontation with officer Scott Mintz accusing Kent Kramer of reckless driving for having gotten his car stuck in ice and snow during a severe snow storm. Witnesses helped push Kent's car back onto the road reporting Kent to have been calm and appreciative just prior to the officer's arrival.
2010-02-07	Darnell McNeil (19)	New Jersey (Newark)	19-year-old Darnell McNeil, of Somerset, denied entry to a Newark, New Jersey go-go bar, returned with a gun, firing into the lounge, critically injuring an off-duty Essex County Sheriff's Officer who chased the youth down a city street, firing his service revolver and killing him, authorities said today.
2010-02-04	Mark Morse (36)	Arizona (Phoenix)	Morse died after a highway-patrol officer used a Taser on him during an altercation on Interstate 17 in North Phoenix, the Arizona Department of Public Safety confirmed Monday. The officer used the weapon after the man - who was walking northbound in a carpool lane on the southbound interstate - "became combative" and "took a fighting stance" with the officer. Morse suffered a breathing issue after the officer took him into custody. He was pronounced dead at John C. Lincoln North Mountain Hospital. The officer believed Morse was "under the influence of something" during the incident.
2010-02-01	Patrick Donovan Trevino (23)	Oklahoma (Oklahoma City)	Police said Trevino was shot by one of two officers responding to reports of a fight inside Human Performance Center. Witnesses reported Trevino fought with both officers and tried to take their weapons. The fight reportedly went from inside the facility into the parking lot area where Trevino reportedly grabbed the recruit's gun and the training officer opened fire - killing Trevino at the scene.

== See also ==
- Death in custody § United States
- Henry A. Wallace Police Crime Public Database
- List of cases of police brutality
- List of countries with annual rates and counts for killings by law enforcement officers
- List of law enforcement officers killed in the line of duty in the United States
- List of law enforcement officers convicted for an on-duty killing in the United States
- List of shootings by US immigration agents
- List of police reforms related to the George Floyd protests
- List of unarmed African Americans killed by law enforcement officers in the United States
- Lists of killings by law enforcement officers
- Police brutality in the United States
- Police misconduct § United States
- Police riot § United States
- Police use of deadly force in the United States
