= Fresno City =

Fresno City may refer to:

- Fresno City, California
- Fresno City College
