= Joseph Saladino =

American politician

Joe Saladino

Supervisor of the Town of Oyster Bay
- Incumbent
- Assumed office January 31, 2017
- Preceded by: John Venditto

Member of the New York State Assembly
- In office March 14, 2004 – January 31, 2017
- Preceded by: Andrew Raia
- Succeeded by: Christine Pellegrino
- Constituency: 12th district (2004-2012); 9th district (2013-2017)

Personal details
- Born: March 28, 1961 (age 65) Massapequa, New York, U.S.
- Party: Republican
- Education: New York Institute of Technology (B.S., M.S.)

Joseph S. Saladino (born March 28, 1961) is an American politician. He is the current Supervisor of the Town of Oyster Bay in Nassau County, New York. Saladino previously served as a member of the New York Assembly. He is a Republican.

== Early life and career ==
Saladino was born in Massapequa, New York in the year 1961, and he graduated from Massapequa High School in 1979. His mother, Jessie Saladino, was a teacher, and his father was the late Joseph J. Saladino, a former New York Supreme Court Justice. He attended Tulane University and the New York Institute of Technology; he received a master's degree in broadcast journalism from the latter. He graduated summa cum laude.

After graduating, he worked in journalism for six years. Some places he worked at included WNYG (AM) and News 12 Long Island. He also had a brief stint working for the Town of Hempstead and Town of Oyster Bay as an assistant.

== New York Assembly ==
After Steven L. Labriola was elected Town Clerk of Oyster Bay, on March 14, 2004, Saladino was elected defeating his Democratic opponent William R. Funk. He won later that year in the general election with about the same percentage, against the same person. He won every election since with at least 2/3 of the vote. After representing Assembly District 12, he was redistricted into District 9 in 2012 and was elected to represent that district.

In the State Assembly, he was a strong advocate for the passing of Megan's Law in New York, and introduced bills related to drug abuse prevention.

== Town Supervisor ==
After John Venditto resigned because he was facing federal corruption charges, the Town Board voted near-unanimously to appoint Saladino as Town Supervisor. He was sworn in by State Supreme Court Judge Stephen Bucaria on January 31, 2017, and he immediately changed leadership around the executive. Within the first month of being appointed, he merged the sanitation, recycling, engineering, highway, vehicle maintenance departments to form the Department of Public Works, reorganized the building department to increase efficiency, and created a Board of Ethics. In the 2018 budget, he lowered spending, slashed the debt, and cut property taxes, something he has wanted done in the state government as well.

Saladino won his first election as Supervisor in November 2017 with just under 52% of the vote in a five-way election, and in 2019 he received 58% of the vote, against his Town Clerk, James Altadonna Jr. He was re-elected in November 2023 against Democrat Jared Behr and November 2025 against Sam C. Sochet

== Professional wrestling ==
Saladino appeared on the April 5, 2023, episode of AEW Dynamite to present a key to the city to All Elite Wrestling world champion Maxwell Jacob Friedman.

== Personal life ==
Saladino is married with three daughters. Saladino has lived in Massapequa his entire life.

New York State Assembly
Preceded by Steven L. Labriola	New York State Assembly, 12th District; 2003–2012	Succeeded by Andrew Raia
Preceded by Andrew Raia	New York State Assembly, 9th District; 2013–2016	Succeeded by Christine Pellegrino
Preceded by John Venditto	Supervisor of the Town of Oyster Bay, New York; 2017–present	Succeeded by incumbent
