= Mike LiPetri =

American attorney (born 1990)

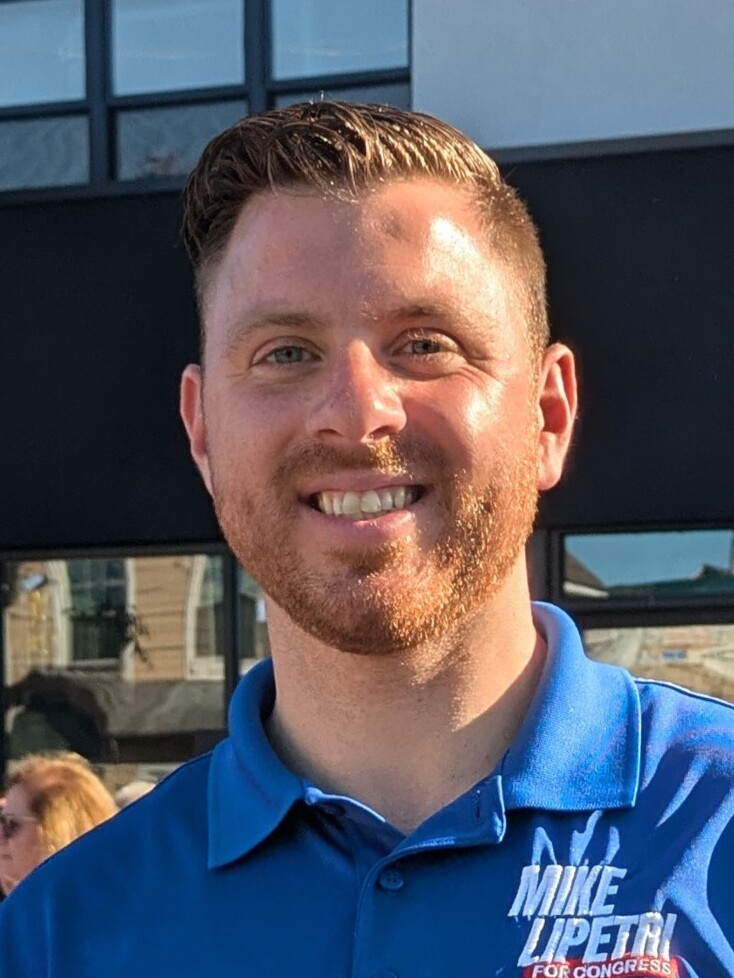
- LiPetri in 2024

Member of the New York State Assembly from the 9th district
- In office January 1, 2019 – January 1, 2021
- Preceded by: Christine Pellegrino
- Succeeded by: Michael Durso

Personal details
- Born: Michael John LiPetri; July 10, 1990 (age 36) Farmingdale, New York, U.S.
- Party: Republican
- Education: University at Albany (BA); Albany Law School (JD)

Michael John LiPetri (born July 10, 1990) is an American Republican attorney and politician from New York State who served one term as a New York State Assemblyman from the 9th district from 2019 to 2021.

LiPetri graduated from Albany Law School in 2015 and was employed as an assistant corporation counsel for the New York City Law Department representing the city and municipal officials. Prior to his election to the assembly, he briefly worked as an associate attorney at Rivkin Radler, LLP.

In 2018, LiPetri defeated incumbent assemblywoman Christine Pellegrino in the general election 56% to 44%. In 2020, rather than run for re-election to the state assembly, LiPetri ran in the Republican primary for New York's 2nd congressional district, losing the nomination to Andrew Garbarino, who went on to the win the seat. In 2024, following redistricting line changes, LiPetri ran for and was the Republican nominee in New York's 3rd congressional district. He was defeated by Democrat Tom Suozzi. LiPetri was the Republican nominee for the same congressional district in the 2026 election, and again lost to Suozzi.

== Career ==
=== New York State Assembly ===
LiPetri was elected in the 2018 assembly election and would go on to represent the 9th district. Located on the South Shore of Long Island, the district includes several communities including Massapequa, Massapequa Park and South Farmingdale in Nassau County and West Babylon, Babylon village, West Islip and part of Brightwaters in Suffolk County, as well as several barrier islands in the Great South Bay.

Following a string of attacks on New York police using water buckets, LiPetri introduced a bill to make it a felony to assault a police officer with water or any other liquid, such as seminal fluid. This followed concerns that these attacks could escalate to include the use of gasoline or acid. LiPetri participated in a ride-along with ICE officers on Long Island.

LiPetri has criticized New York's bail reform law, which eliminates cash bail for certain misdemeanors and allows people charged with nonviolent crimes to be released without bail pending a court appearance. LiPetri was one of two assemblymen to sponsor a bill to increase penalties for sex crimes involving a minor.

LiPetri sponsored a bill in the Assembly to ban the usage of products that contain 1,4-dioxane: a carcinogen found in tap water on Long Island. LiPetri voted in favor of the bill in the Environmental Conservation Committee. The bill was passed and signed into law. LiPetri also cosponsored and voted for a bill to make it easier for public water suppliers to sue polluters for contaminating water supplies. This bill was also passed and signed into law.

LiPetri cosponsored legislation to let college students deduct college supplies—including textbooks—from their taxes. LiPetri also cosponsored the "Learning for Work" Act to establish a youth apprenticeship program and incentivize businesses to participate for occupations which do not require a college education.

During the COVID-19 pandemic in 2020, Governor Andrew Cuomo and the New York State Department of Health ordered nursing homes to accept patients who tested positive for COVID-19. As a result, over 4,500 COVID-19 patients were sent to New York nursing homes. LiPetri called for New York Health Commissioner Howard Zucker to be fired as a result of this policy, and called for a federal investigation of this policy, alleging that it resulted in New York's higher levels of COVID-19 cases and deaths.

LiPetri was a member of the Committee on Environmental Conservation, Committee on Corporations, Authorities, and Commissions, Committee on Housing, Committee on Racing and Wagering, and the Committee on Social Services.

=== 2020 congressional election ===
Following the announcement that 14-term U.S. Representative Peter T. King would not be running for re-election in 2020, LiPetri announced his intention to run for Congress in New York's 2nd congressional district. He ran against Assemblyman Andrew Garbarino in the Republican primary. Garbarino defeated LiPetri, 65% to 35%. The district was a top target for the Democratic Congressional Campaign Committee in 2020.

=== 2024 congressional election ===
LiPetri was chosen by the Nassau County GOP to be their candidate for New York's 3rd congressional district in the 2024 election cycle, a decision made amidst notable competition from within the party. The primary was set for June 25, 2024, but was cancelled when LiPetri was the only person slated to be on the ballot. LiPetri's early selection by the Nassau County GOP leaders positioned him favorably against his challengers, avoiding the typical petitioning process required for candidacy. In the general election, LiPetri was defeated by Thomas Suozzi by a margin of 51.7% to 48.1%.

=== 2026 congressional election ===
In February 2026, LiPetri announced his candidacy for New York's 3rd congressional district in the 2026 election. He was defeated again by Tom Suozzi, making LiPetri a perennial candidate for congress.

== Personal life ==
His grandfather, Angelo LiPetri, was a pitcher for the Phillies during the 1950s.
