= Keith Brown (New York politician) =

American politician

Member of the New York State Assembly from the 12th district
- Incumbent
- Assumed office November 22, 2020
- Preceded by: Andrew Raia
- Succeeded by: Craig Herskowitz (elect)

Personal details
- Born: July 17, 1968 (age 58)
- Party: Republican
- Spouse: Barbara Brown
- Children: 3
- Education: SUNY Albany (BA); Touro Law Center (JD)

Keith P. Brown (born July 17, 1968) is an American politician from the state of New York. A Republican, he is currently serving in the New York State Assembly, representing the 12th district, which encompasses portions of the towns of Babylon, Huntington, and Islip within Suffolk County. He assumed office in January 2021.

== Political career ==
While a college student, Brown was an intern for then-state senator Norman Levy.

Brown was selected by Suffolk County Republicans as their nominee for a special election scheduled for April 28, 2020 that was postponed due to the COVID-19 pandemic. Brown defeated Democratic challenger Michael Marcantonio in 2020, and Marcantonio, who believed mail-in ballots could hand him a tight victory, conceded the race 16 days after election day. The final vote total was 35,190 for Brown and 33,027 for Marcantonio. Brown assumed office in November 2020.

== Personal life ==
Brown is a graduate of SUNY Albany and Touro Law Center. He is a resident of Northport, New York, and lives with his wife, Barbara, and their 3 children.
