= Christine Pellegrino =

American politician

Member of the New York State Assembly from the 9th district
- In office May 24, 2017 – January 2, 2019
- Preceded by: Joseph Saladino
- Succeeded by: Michael LiPetri

Personal details
- Party: Democratic Party

Christine Pellegrino is a former member of the New York State Assembly from the 9th District. She is a member of the Democratic Party. Prior to her election, Pellegrino was a teacher for 25 years, spending most of her career teaching in Baldwin Public Schools. She got her start in political activism and involvement as an educator in NYSUT and in grassroots education movements. Pellegrino ran as the 2020 Democratic nominee for the 4th District of the New York Senate.

Pellegrino served as a delegate for Bernie Sanders during the 2016 presidential primaries.

In an upset, she won a special election on May 23, 2017, to succeed Republican Joseph Saladino, who was appointed Oyster Bay town supervisor. She was previously a leader in the anti-Common Core "opt-out" movement and received significant support from the state teachers union in her 2017 run. She was a featured speaker at the 2017 People's Summit, the 2017 American Federation of Teachers' TEACH Conference, the Louisiana Federation of Teachers Convention in 2017, and the 2018 AFT National Convention held in Pittsburgh.

In her first term representing the 9th District, Pellegrino secured various state grants for school districts, public libraries, and clean drinking water. As a member of the Assembly Committee on Environmental Conservation and Chair of the Legislative Commission on Toxic Substances and Hazardous Waste, she strongly opposed offshore drilling and supported clean-up projects by the NYS Department of Environmental Conservation. In 2018, Pellegrino was one of two Assembly Democrats to vote against bail reform legislation.

Pellegrino was defeated for re-election to a full term by Republican Michael LiPetri in the 2018 general election.

Political offices
Preceded by Joseph Saladino	New York State Assembly; 9th District; 2017–2019	Succeeded by Michael LiPetri
