= People's Summit =

Annual summit

- Status: Inactive
- Frequency: 2016, 2017
- Venue: McCormick Place, Chicago, IL
- Inaugurated: June 2016
- Organiser: National Nurses United, The People for Bernie Sanders, other progressive groups
- Website: thepeoplessummit.org

The People's Summit was an annual conference in Chicago held by a group of progressive political organizations in the United States.

== People's Summit 2016 ==
Held in June 2016, the first People's Summit was set against the backdrop of the Bernie Sanders presidential campaign, 2016. The conference was led by National Nurses United and The People for Bernie Sanders. Other groups involved in organizing the conference included Democratic Socialists of America, Food & Water Watch, Our Revolution (previously the Bernie Sanders presidential campaign, 2016), People Demanding Action, People's Action, Progressive Democrats of America, Reclaim Chicago, United Electrical, Radio and Machine Workers of America, United Students Against Sweatshops, Million Hoodies, and African-Americans for Bernie Sanders.

The organizers of the Summit stated that they wanted to harness the energy of the Sanders campaign. Over 3,000 people attended the 2016 People's Summit to hear speakers including Rosario Dawson, Tulsi Gabbard, Gaby Hoffmann, Naomi Klein, Jesus "Chuy" Garcia, and Frances Fox Piven. The most cited speech was by Nina Turner, a Sanders surrogate and member of the Ohio State Senate, with the rousing line: "We need folks elected to office who actually give a shit about the people they represent!".

Media coverage of the 2016 Summit focused on different themes, with Rolling Stone calling the event a "coming out party for a new kind of politics" and "the kindling for democratic socialism with teeth." The New York Times focused on the split among attendees between Bernie supporters who would support Hillary Clinton during the general election, and those who would not—known as 'Bernie or Bust'. The correspondent from The Nation remarked on how organized the Summit was compared to similar left-wing political events.

== People's Summit 2017 ==
The second Peoples Summit was held June 9–11, 2017 at McCormick Place. The conference was sponsored by People for Bernie, National Nurses United, Our Revolution, and others. The theme for the 2017 summit was "Beyond Resistance: A People's Movement for a Just World". Bernie Sanders headlined the conference, along with RoseAnn DeMoro, Naomi Klein, Nina Turner, Michael Moore, Linda Sarsour, Christine Pellegrino, Larry Krasner, Chokwe Antar Lumumba, and others. The conference was attended by over 4,000 people.

Sanders delivered the keynote speech calling for an agenda "that can enhance and expand issue campaigns and hold all elected officials accountable to popular demands for justice, equality, and freedom." During his speech, he repeatedly criticized the Democratic Party, calling it an "absolute failure" and blaming it for the election of President Trump.

I'm often asked by the media and others: How did it come about that Donald Trump, the most unpopular presidential candidate in the modern history of our country, won the election? And my answer is—and my answer is that Trump didn't win the election; the Democratic Party lost the election. Let us—let us be very, very clear: The current model—the current model and the current strategy of the Democratic Party is an absolute failure. This is not—this is not my opinion. This is the facts. You know, we focus a lot on the presidential election, but we also have to understand that Democrats have lost the U.S. House, the U.S. Senate. Republicans now control almost two-thirds of the governors' chairs throughout the country. And over the last nine years, Democrats have lost almost 1,000 legislative seats in states all across this country. Today—today, in almost half of the states in America, Democratic Party has almost no political presence at all. Now, if that's not a failure, if that's not a failed model, I don't know what a failed model is.

The conference appeared to strive to pass the leadership role from Bernie Sanders to a whole new generation of candidates. When Sanders spoke and the crowd began to chant the familiar "Bernie! Bernie!," he shouted back, "It's not Bernie. "It's you. It's us."

Several speakers stressed that future generations need protection as well. Nina Turner's speech drew boisterous approval from the attendees. She said, "You've got to walk the walk ... you have to care more about the next generation than the next election." Mike Sylvester, a union organizer for 20 years who ran a successful campaign as a socialist for the Maine House of Representatives in 2016, said that as he went door-to-door campaigning for long hours, he would remind himself that he was running for office for the future of his children.

== See also ==
- Social democracy
- US labor law
