= New York's 12th State Assembly district =

American legislative district

Assemblymember
Keith Brown; R–Northport

New York's 12th State Assembly district is one of the 150 districts in the New York State Assembly. It has been represented by Republican Keith Brown since 2021. In 2026, he announced that he would not seek re-election.

== Geography ==
=== 2020s ===
District 12 is in Suffolk County. It encompasses portions of the towns of Babylon, Huntington, and Islip, including the villages of Northport, Centerport, Lloyd Harbor, Eatons Neck, Huntington Bay, Deer Park and portions of Bayport and Commack.

The district overlaps New York's 1st, 2nd and 3rd congressional districts, and overlaps the 2nd and 4th districts of the New York State Senate.

=== 2010s ===
District 12 is in Suffolk County. It encompasses portions of the towns of Babylon, Huntington, and Islip. including the villages of Northport, Centerport, Eatons Neck, Deer Park, Bayport and portions of Commack.

== Recent election results ==
=== 2026 ===
2026 New York State Assembly election, District 12
Party	Candidate	Votes	%
Republican	David Weber Jr.		
Conservative	David Weber Jr.		
Total	David Weber Jr.		
Democratic	Craig Herskowitz		
Working Families	Craig Herskowitz		
Total	Craig Herskowitz		
Write-in			
Total votes			

=== 2024 ===
2024 New York State Assembly election, District 12
Party	Candidate	Votes	%
Republican	Keith Brown	34,370	
Conservative	Keith Brown	4,438	
Total	Keith Brown (incumbent)	38,808	57.1
Democratic	Thomas Cox	29,137	42.8
Write-in		53	0.1
Total votes		67,990	100.0
Republican hold			

=== 2022 ===
2022 New York State Assembly election, District 12
Party	Candidate	Votes	%
Republican	Keith Brown	26,230	
Conservative	Keith Brown	4,160	
Total	Keith Brown (incumbent)	30,390	57.5
Democratic	Cooper Macco	22,428	42.5
Write-in		12	0.0
Total votes		52,830	100.0
Republican hold			

=== 2020 ===
2020 New York State Assembly election, District 12
Party	Candidate	Votes	%
Republican	Keith Brown	30,674	
Conservative	Keith Brown	3,738	
Independence	Keith Brown	778	
Total	Keith Brown	35,190	51.6
Democratic	Michael Marcantonio	30,918	
Working Families	Michael Marcantonio	2,109	
Total	Michael Marcantonio	33,027	48.4
Write-in		16	0.0
Total votes		68,233	100.0
Republican hold			

=== 2018 ===
2018 New York State Assembly election, District 12
Party	Candidate	Votes	%
Republican	Andrew Raia	23,868	
Conservative	Andrew Raia	2,896	
Independence	Andrew Raia	949	
Reform	Andrew Raia	140	
Total	Andrew Raia (incumbent)	27,853	55.4
Democratic	Avrum Rosen	22,416	44.6
Write-in		8	0.0
Total votes		50,277	100.0
Republican hold			

=== 2016 ===
2016 New York State Assembly election, District 12
Party	Candidate	Votes	%
Republican	Andrew Raia	32,325	
Conservative	Andrew Raia	4,833	
Independence	Andrew Raia	1,609	
Reform	Andrew Raia	254	
Total	Andrew Raia (incumbent)	39,021	64.8
Democratic	Spencer Rumsey	21,243	35.2
Write-in		21	0.0
Total votes		60,285	100.0
Republican hold			

=== 2014 ===
2014 New York State Assembly election, District 12
Party	Candidate	Votes	%
Republican	Andrew Raia	17,202	
Independence	Andrew Raia	3,553	
Conservative	Andrew Raia	3,455	
Total	Andrew Raia (incumbent)	24,210	99.8
Write-in		58	0.2
Total votes		24,268	100.0
Republican hold			

=== 2012 ===
2012 New York State Assembly election, District 12
Party	Candidate	Votes	%
Republican	Andrew Raia	28,062	
Independence	Andrew Raia	5,460	
Conservative	Andrew Raia	5,204	
Total	Andrew Raia (incumbent)	38,726	99.7
Write-in		124	0.3
Total votes		38,850	100.0
Republican hold			
