= Craig Herskowitz =

American politician

Member-elect of the New York State Assembly from the 12th district
- Assuming office January 2027
- Succeeding: Keith Brown

Personal details
- Party: Democratic

Craig Herskowitz is an American politician. A member of the Democratic Party, he is the member-elect for the 12th district of the New York State Assembly.
