= New York's 9th State Assembly district =

American legislative district

Assemblymember
Michael Durso; R–Massapequa Park
- Registration: 38.9% Republican; 27.8% Democratic; 27.4% No party preference
- Demographics: 82% White; 3% Black; 11% Hispanic; 2% Asian; 0% Native American; 0% Hawaiian/Pacific Islander; 0% Other
- Population (2020): 126,431
- Registered voters: 101,138

New York's 9th State Assembly district is one of the 150 districts in the New York State Assembly. It has been represented by Republican Michael Durso since 2021.

== Geography ==
=== 2020s ===
District 9 includes portions of Nassau and Suffolk counties. It includes portions of the towns of Oyster Bay, Babylon, and Islip, and most of the villages of Massapequa Park, North Amityville and Babylon. The district also includes the hamlets of North Babylon, West Babylon, West Islip, and portions of Fire Island and the Great South Bay.

The district overlaps New York's 2nd and 3rd congressional districts, as well as the 4th and 8th districts of the New York State Senate.

=== 2010s ===
District 9 includes portions of Nassau and Suffolk counties. It includes portions of the towns of Oyster Bay, Babylon, and Islip, and the villages of Massapequa Park, Babylon, and Brightwaters. The district also includes the hamlets of South Farmingdale, Massapequa, West Babylon, West Islip, and portions of Fire Island and the Great South Bay.

== Recent election results ==
=== 2026 ===
2026 New York State Assembly election, District 9
Party	Candidate	Votes	%
Republican	Michael Durso		
Conservative	Michael Durso		
Total	Michael Durso (incumbent)		
Democratic	Christopher Walis		
Write-in			
Total votes			

=== 2024 ===
2024 New York State Assembly election, District 9
Party	Candidate	Votes	%
Republican	Michael Durso	42,222	
Conservative	Michael Durso	4,236	
Total	Michael Durso (incumbent)	46,458	67.5
Democratic	Steven Dellavecchia	22,372	32.5
Write-in		21	0.0
Total votes		68,651	100.0
Republican hold			

=== 2022 ===
2022 New York State Assembly election, District 9
Party	Candidate	Votes	%
Republican	Michael Durso	33,029	
Conservative	Michael Durso	4,144	
Total	Michael Durso (incumbent)	37,173	69.5
Democratic	Steven Dellavecchia	16,316	30.5
Write-in		13	0.0
Total votes		53,502	100.0
Republican hold			

=== 2020 ===
2020 New York State Assembly election, District 9
Party	Candidate	Votes	%
Republican	Michael Durso	38,614	
Conservative	Michael Durso	3,737	
Independence	Michael Durso	645	
Libertarian	Michael Durso	344	
Total	Michael Durso	43,340	62.5
Democratic	Ann Brancato	24,532	
Working Families	Ann Brancato	1,483	
Total	Ann Brancato	26,025	37.5
Write-in		20	0.0
Total votes		69,385	100.0
Republican hold			

=== 2018 ===
2018 New York State Assembly election, District 9
Party	Candidate	Votes	%
Republican	Mike LiPetri	25,612	
Conservative	Mike LiPetri	2,701	
Reform	Mike LiPetri	169	
Total	Mike LiPetri	28,482	55.9
Democratic	Christine Pellegrino	21,091	
Independence	Christine Pellegrino	547	
Working Families	Christine Pellegrino	523	
Women's Equality	Christine Pellegrino	275	
Total	Christine Pellegrino (incumbent)	22,436	44.1
Write-in		20	0.0
Total votes		50,924	100.0
Republican gain from Democratic			

=== 2017 special ===
2017 New York State Assembly special election, District 9
Party	Candidate	Votes	%
Democratic	Christine Pellegrino	5,324	
Working Families	Christine Pellegrino	513	
Total	Christine Pellegrino	5,837	57.4
Republican	Thomas Gargiulo	3,181	
Conservative	Thomas Gargiulo	867	
Independence	Thomas Gargiulo	292	
Total	Thomas Gargiulo	4,340	42.6
Write-in		14	0.0
Total votes		10,177	100.0
Democratic gain from Republican			

=== 2016 ===
2016 New York State Assembly election, District 9
Party	Candidate	Votes	%
Republican	Joseph Saladino	35,368	
Conservative	Joseph Saladino	4,352	
Independence	Joseph Saladino	1,181	
Tax Revolt	Joseph Saladino	269	
Reform	Joseph Saladino	171	
Total	Joseph Saladino (incumbent)	41,341	68.7
Democratic	Brendan Cunningham	18,841	31.3
Write-in		29	0.0
Total votes		60,211	100.0
Republican hold			

=== 2014 ===
2014 New York State Assembly election, District 9
Party	Candidate	Votes	%
Republican	Joseph Saladino	18,488	
Conservative	Joseph Saladino	3,125	
Independence	Joseph Saladino	1,084	
Tax Revolt Party	Joseph Saladino	187	
Total	Joseph Saladino (incumbent)	22,884	65.7
Democratic	Edward Buturia	11,935	34.3
Write-in		10	0.0
Total votes		34,829	100.0
Republican hold			

=== 2012 ===
2012 New York State Assembly election, District 9
Primary election
Party	Candidate	Votes	%
Republican	Joseph Saladino (incumbent)	3,355	81.6
Republican	Richard Young	759	18.4
Write-in		0	0.0
Total votes		4,114	100
General election
Republican	Joseph Saladino	28,349	
Conservative	Joseph Saladino	4,287	
Independence	Joseph Saladino	1,456	
Tax Revolt Party	Joseph Saladino	241	
Total	Joseph Saladino (incumbent)	34,333	68.7
Democratic	Jay Cherlin	15,617	31.3
Write-in		16	0.0
Total votes		49,966	100.0
Republican hold			
