= Michael Durso =

American politician (born 1979)

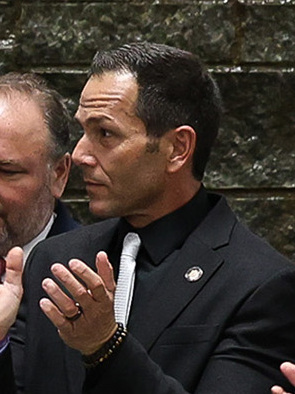
- Durso in 2025

Member of the New York State Assembly from the 9th district
- Incumbent
- Assumed office January 6, 2021
- Preceded by: Mike LiPetri

Personal details
- Born: November 23, 1979 (age 46) Nassau County, New York, U.S.
- Party: Republican

Michael Durso is an American politician serving as a member of the New York State Assembly from the 9th district. Elected in November 2020, he assumed office on January 6, 2021.

== Early life ==
Durso was born in Nassau County, New York and raised in the town of Massapequa Park. Growing up, Durso's parents worked multiple jobs to support the family. After graduating from high school, Durso became a sanitation worker.

== Career ==
Prior to entering politics, Durso has worked as a sanitation supervisor. He is a member of CSEA Local 881. He previously worked as a public safety officer at Hofstra University. Durso was elected to the New York State Assembly in November 2020 and assumed office on January 6, 2021.

Durso currently sits on the Environmental Conservation, Labor, Science and Technology, Governmental Operations, and Transportation committees.

New York State Assembly
Preceded by Mike LiPetri	Member of the New York Assembly from the 9th District; 2021–present	Incumbent
