= Berner High School =

School in New York, United States

Location
- 51 Carman Mill Road; Massapequa, New York 11758; United States; 40°40′23″N 73°26′1″W

Information
- Established: 1962
- Closed: 1987
- School district: Massapequa Public Schools
- Grades: 9–12
- Colors: Navy blue and gold
- Team name: Bisons
- Website: Official website

Alfred G. Berner High School was a public high school that served Massapequa, New York, from 1962 to 1987. The school was named after Alfred G. Berner, who served on the Board of Education from 1945 to 1954. After the closure of the high school, the building was converted to use as Berner Middle School for grades 6–8, and feeds to Massapequa High School.

== History ==
Berner High School opened in January 1962 as a junior high school under principal Donald Woodworth. Half of that year's 9th and 10th grade students attending Massapequa High School were assigned to Berner High School for the 1962–1963 school year and the school's enrollment peaked in the early 1970s. After a decline in district enrollment from a high of 17,000 students in 1970 to 7,800 by 1986, Berner High School closed in 1987.

== Campus ==
BHS included a track, football field, and tennis courts. After the closure of the high school, these mostly fell into disrepair. In summer 2016, the Massapequa Board of Education elected to renovate the athletic facilities at Berner. The north soccer field is often used by the Long Island Junior Soccer League for the Massapequa Soccer Club's travel teams, while the south soccer field is primarily used by middle school students during the soccer and football seasons. The tennis courts were torn down and replaced by a softball field.

== Extracurricular activities ==
=== Athletics ===
Berner High School athletic teams were known as the Bisons.

Bob Reifsnyder, an All-American player at the United States Naval Academy and who was inducted into the College Football Hall of Fame in 1997, was the varsity football coach for the Berner Bisons for many years as well as a math teacher at the school. Reifsnyder, the 1957 recipient of the Maxwell Award for College Player of the Year, coached at least two of the Baldwin brothers, Alec and Daniel. Under Reifsnyder, the football Bisons won the South Shore (Long Island) championship in 1971 and made it to the Nassau County Conference I-II championship game in 1974, losing to Syosset. The Berner football team went undefeated in 1967 and 1968.

== Notable alumni ==
- Alec Baldwin (1976)
- Daniel Baldwin (1979)
- William Baldwin (1981)
- Stephen Baldwin (1984)
- Bob Nelson (1976)
- Emily Pickering (1981)
