= Massapequa Park, New York =

- Village
- Incorporated Village of Massapequa Park
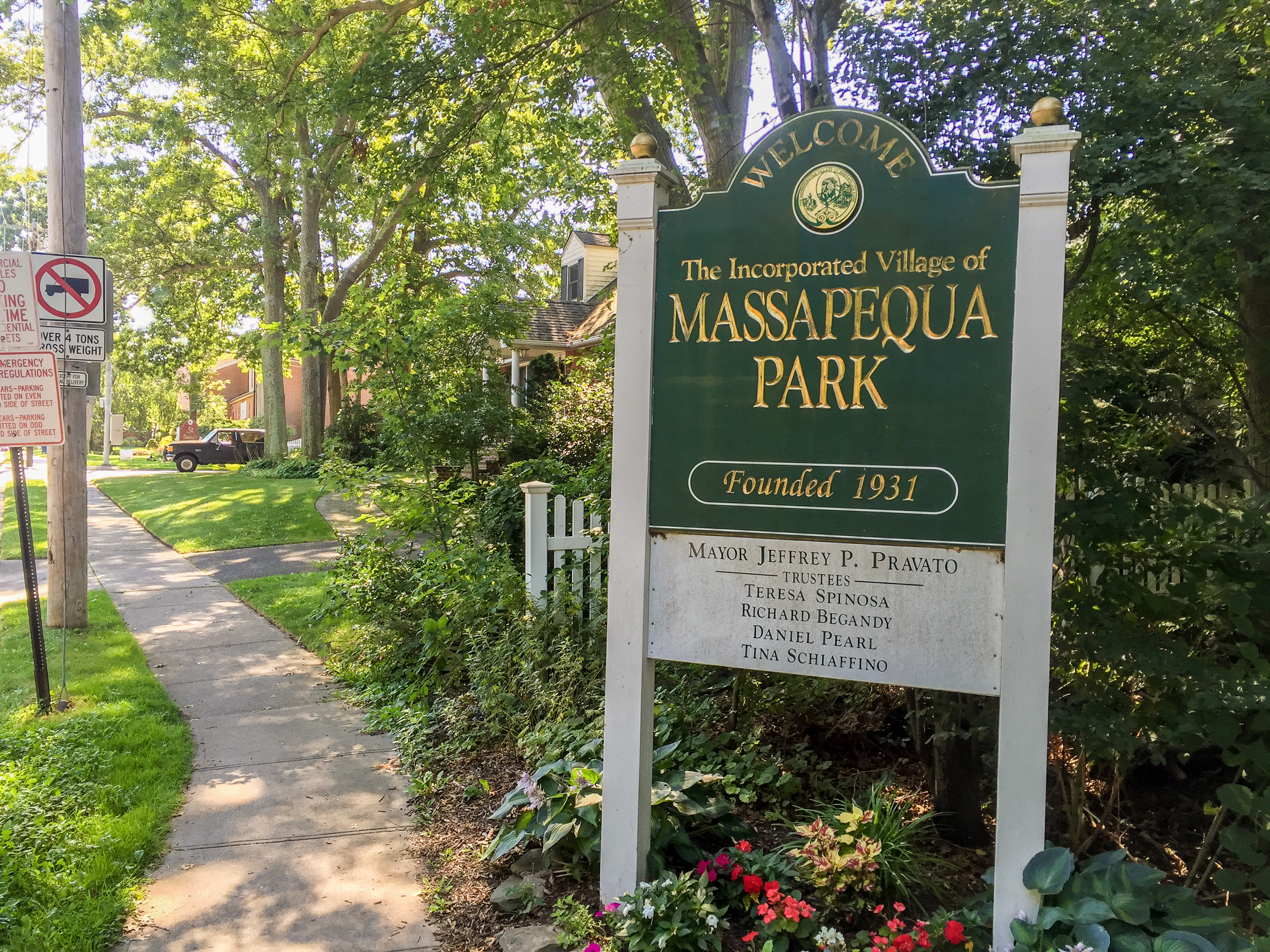
- A Massapequa Park welcome sign in 2016

- Seal
- Nicknames: "Masspark"; "Matzo-Pizza Park"; "The Park"
- Location in Nassau County and the state of New York

- Location on Long Island Location within the state of New York
- Coordinates: 40°41′4″N 73°26′58″W
- Country: United States
- State: New York
- County: Nassau
- Town: Oyster Bay
- Incorporated: 1931

Government
  - Mayor: Thomas A. Warns

Area
  - Total: 2.25 sq mi (5.82 km^{2})
  - Land: 2.19 sq mi (5.68 km^{2})
  - Water: 0.054 sq mi (0.14 km^{2})
- Elevation: 23 ft (7 m)

Population (2020)
  - Total: 17,109
  - Density: 7,805.6/sq mi (3,013.76/km^{2})
- Time zone: UTC-5 (Eastern (EST))
  - Summer (DST): UTC-4 (EDT)
- ZIP code: 11762
- Area codes: 516, 363
- FIPS code: 36-45997
- GNIS feature ID: 2390968
- Website: masspkny.gov

Massapequa Park is an incorporated village located within the southern portion of the Town of Oyster Bay in Nassau County, on the South Shore of Long Island, in New York, United States. The population was 17,109 at the time of the 2020 census.

The areas south and east of the village borders are considered the hamlet of Massapequa because they are under the jurisdiction of the Town of Oyster Bay rather than the village. The hamlet shares the same zip code, fire department and school district as the village.

== History ==
The village located on the South Shore of Long Island shares the early Native American history of Massapequa. Then in the 19th century, families of German descent relocated from Brooklyn to what is now Massapequa Park, and the community which was formed was known as Wurtenberg or Stadtwurtemburg. The main attraction and center of activity was the Woodcastle Hotel, a rooming house built in 1868 on Front Street next to the fire department as a summer resort. It was destroyed by fire in 1952 and replaced by houses.

In 1928, The New York Times ran ads for Massapequa Park, a development built by a real estate firm owned by Michael J. Brady, Frank Cryan, and Peter Colleran. The three Irish-Americans described their project as having a bit of Old Erin; the area between Sunrise Highway and Merrick Road still has mostly Irish street names.

In 1931, Massapequa Park was incorporated as a village to ensure control of land use and other issues. Several dozen kit houses from Sears Roebuck were built in two different areas of the village. These include some of the largest model kit houses offered by Sears.

The village once had its own airport, the Fitzmaurice Flying Field, named in 1929 for James Fitzmaurice, one of a crew of three to be the first to fly a plane from east to west across the Atlantic (Baldonnel, Ireland to Greenly Island in Labrador, Canada). An estimated 100,000 people came to the dedication of the field on Spruce Street. The field was used by private planes.

The field was eventually closed and became the home for the athletic fields of the 4M Club, a popular youth athletic program founded by Larry Neusse, and supported by a wide range of local residents. Today the site is home to McKenna Elementary School (which used to be a junior high school) and the Nassau County Police Academy (which used to be Hawthorn Elementary School).

== Geography ==
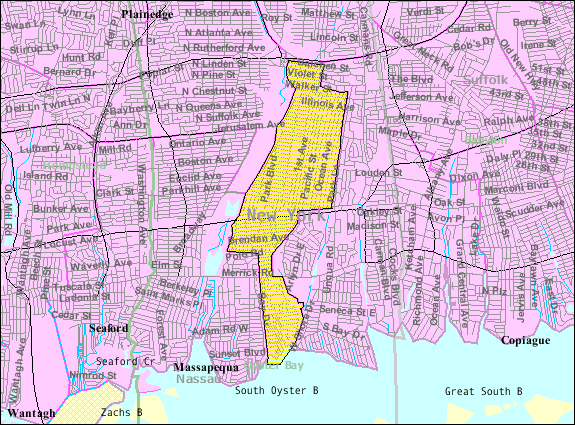
U.S. Census map of Massapequa Park

According to the United States Census Bureau, the village has a total area of 1.6 square miles (4.1 km^{2}), all land, of which 2.19 square miles (5.7 km^{2}) is land and 0.06 square miles (0.16 km^{2}) is water.

Massapequa Park is bordered by Massapequa to the west, East Massapequa to the east, North Massapequa to the northwest, and South Farmingdale to the north. To its south, the village is bordered by South Oyster Bay–a large bay separating Long Island from Jones Beach Island.

== Demographics ==
Historical population
Census	Pop.	Note	%±
1940	488		—
1950	2,334		378.3%
1960	19,904		752.8%
1970	22,112		11.1%
1980	19,779		−10.6%
1990	18,044		−8.8%
2000	17,499		−3.0%
2010	17,008		−2.8%
2020	17,109		0.6%
U.S. Decennial Census

=== Racial and ethnic composition ===
Massapequa Park village, New York – Racial and ethnic composition Note: the US Census treats Hispanic/Latino as an ethnic category. This table excludes Latinos from the racial categories and assigns them to a separate category. Hispanics/Latinos may be of any race.
Race / Ethnicity (NH = Non-Hispanic)	Pop 2000	Pop 2010	Pop 2020	% 2000	% 2010	% 2020
White alone (NH)	16,614	15,858	15,105	94.94%	93.24%	88.29%
Black or African American alone (NH)	37	52	78	0.21%	0.31%	0.46%
Native American or Alaska Native alone (NH)	2	1	12	0.01%	0.01%	0.07%
Asian alone (NH)	243	255	306	1.39%	1.50%	1.79%
Native Hawaiian or Pacific Islander alone (NH)	0	1	0	0.00%	0.01%	0.00%
Other race alone (NH)	6	4	62	0.03%	0.02%	0.36%
Mixed race or Multiracial (NH)	72	80	311	0.41%	0.47%	1.82%
Hispanic or Latino (any race)	525	757	1,235	3.00%	4.45%	7.22%
Total	17,499	17,008	17,109	100.00%	100.00%	100.00%

=== 2020 census ===
As of the 2020 census, there were 17,109 people living in Massapequa Park. The median age was 43.1 years. 21.4% of residents were under the age of 18 and 18.8% were 65 years of age or older. For every 100 females there were 94.4 males, and for every 100 females age 18 and over there were 93.0 males.

100.0% of residents lived in urban areas, while 0.0% lived in rural areas.

There were 5,759 households, of which 34.9% had children under the age of 18. Of all households, 68.9% were married-couple households, 9.3% had a male householder with no spouse or partner present, and 19.3% had a female householder with no spouse or partner present. About 15.2% of all households were made up of individuals, and 10.4% had someone living alone who was 65 years of age or older.

There were 5,913 housing units, of which 2.6% were vacant. The homeowner vacancy rate was 0.5% and the rental vacancy rate was 3.2%.

=== 2010 census ===
As of the 2010 census, there were 17,008 people, 5,731 households, and 4,736 families residing in the village. There were 5,844 housing units at an average density of 2,656.4 per square mile (1,025.6/km^{2}). The racial makeup of the village was 96.9% White, 0.3% African American, 0.04% Native American, 1.5% Asian, 0.01% Pacific Islander, 0.5% from other races, and 0.7% from two or more races. Hispanic or Latino of any race were 4.5% of the population.

There were 5,731 households, out of which 36.4% had children under the age of 18 living with them, 70.7% were headed by married couples living together, 9.2% had a female householder with no husband present, and 17.4% were non-families. 14.9% of all households were made up of individuals, and 9.2% were someone living alone who was 65 years of age or older. The average household size was 2.97 and the average family size was 3.31.

In the village, the population was spread out, with 24.6% under the age of 18, 6.5% from 18 to 24, 23.2% from 25 to 44, 29.5% from 45 to 64, and 16.1% who were 65 years of age or older. The median age was 42.5 years. For every 100 females, there were 94.1 males. For every 100 females age 18 and over, there were 89.6 males.

The three main ethnic backgrounds are Italian (45%), Irish (28%), and German (18%), comprising over three-fourths of the village's population. The rest of the population is of English, Russian, Polish, Swedish, Scottish, Greek, French, Dutch, and other background.

The median income in the village for 2010 was $98,725 and the median income for a family was $110,417. The per capita income for the village was $38,226. About 1.0% of families and 1.4% of the population were below the poverty line, including 1.3% of those under age 18 and 2.5% of those age 65 or over.

Due to the sizable Jewish and Italian populations long associated with the area, the village is frequently referred to as "Matzo-Pizza Park."

== Government ==
As of April 2026, the Mayor of Massapequa Park is Daniel M. Pearl, and the Village Trustees are Dana M. Durso, Tina Schiaffino, Todd A. Svec, and Christine M. Wiss.

The Mayor and members of the Board of Trustees are each elected to two-year terms, and the village elections are held in March.

=== Politics ===
In the 2024 U.S. presidential election, the majority of Massapequa Park voters voted for Donald J. Trump (R).

== Parks and recreation ==
The Village of Massapequa Park owns and operates three parks main: Brady Park, Colleran Park, and Mansfield Park. It also owns and maintains several memorials and associated parks which are located throughout the village.

== Education ==
The village is primarily located within the boundaries of (and is thus served by) the Massapequa Union Free School District.

During the 1960s, 1970s and much of the 1980s the Massapequa School District had seven elementary schools (Carman Road, East Lake, Birch Lane, Fairfield, Unqua, Hawthorn, Lockhart), two junior high schools (McKenna and Ames) and two high schools (Massapequa and Alfred G. Berner).

In 1987, the Massapequa school district restructured the district by leasing Carmans Road Elementary to Nassau BOCES and Hawthorne Elementary to the Nassau County Police Academy. John P. McKenna Jr. High School was converted to an elementary school, while Alfred G. Berner became the new junior high, later becoming a middle school. J. Lewis Ames Jr. High School is no longer a middle school, but a "9th Grade Center"– the Ames Campus of Massapequa High School.

The northern section of the village, meanwhile, are located within the boundaries of (and is thus served by) the Farmingdale Union Free School District.

== Transportation ==
The Long Island Rail Road's Massapequa Park station on the Babylon Branch is located in the village.

Major roads within the village include Merrick Road (CR 27) and Sunrise Highway (NY 27). Furthermore, the Village of Massapequa Park owns roughly 30 miles (48 km) of roads, which are maintained by the Village of Massapequa Park Department of Public Works.

== Notable people ==
- Phil Baroni, mixed martial arts fighter
- Matt Bennett, actor known for Victorious
- Candy Darling, Warhol superstar
- Roy DeMeo, mafioso in the Gambino crime family
- Michael Durso, member of the New York State Assembly
- Carlo Gambino, late don of the Gambino crime family
- Rex Heuermann, serial killer and architect
- Anthony Ingrassia, American playwright, producer, and director
- Ron Kovic, author of Born on the Fourth of July, graduated Massapequa High School in 1964
- Stanley Newman, puzzle creator, editor, and publisher
- Dan Nigro, record producer and songwriter
- Sean Tyas, trance DJ

== See also ==
- List of municipalities in New York
- East Massapequa, New York
- Massapequa, New York
- North Massapequa, New York
