= Andrew Raia =

American politician

Huntington Town Clerk
- Incumbent
- Assumed office January 6, 2020
- Preceded by: Jo-Ann Raia

Member of the New York State Assembly from the 9th district
- In office 2003 – 2013
- Preceded by: John J. Flanagan
- Succeeded by: Joseph Saladino

Member of the New York State Assembly from the 12th district
- In office 2013–2020
- Preceded by: Joseph Saladino
- Succeeded by: Keith Brown

Personal details
- Born: May 8, 1968 (age 58) Huntington, New York
- Party: Republican
- Education: State University of New York at New Paltz (B.A.)
- Profession: Politician

Andrew P. Raia (born May 8, 1968) is an American politician from Long Island, New York. A Republican, Raia became the clerk of the town of Huntington, New York on January 6, 2020. Raia previously served in the New York State Assembly representing the 9th and 12th districts, respectively.

== Life and career ==
Andrew P. Raia was born and raised in Huntington, New York. He holds a bachelor's degree in political science from the State University of New York at New Paltz, from which he graduated in 1991. Prior to his election to the Assembly, he was a staffer in legislative offices in both houses of the New York state legislature, as well as the Suffolk County Legislature.

In 2002, Assemblyman John J. Flanagan announced that he would run for the New York State Senate, leaving his district open. Soon afterward, Raia announced that he would run for the seat. The Democratic candidate, Mark Cuthbertson, was favored to win. However, Raia took the seat that fall, 50% to 47%. He won his re-election campaigns easily. Raia represented Assembly District 9 from 2003 to 2013. Following redistricting, he represented Assembly District 12 beginning in 2013. Raia served as Assistant Minority Leader in the Assembly.

Raia was elected Huntington Town Clerk on November 5, 2019, defeating Simon Saks of Dix Hills. Thereafter, he resigned his Assembly seat. Raia was sworn in as Huntington Town Clerk on January 6, 2020; he succeeded his mother, Jo-Ann Raia, who had held the post for 38 years.

Raia resides in East Northport, New York.
