= Henry A. Wallace Police Crime Public Database =

Police officers arrested 2005-14 in the US

The Henry A. Wallace Police Crime Public Database is an internet database open to public queries. The database, built by criminologist and former police officer Philip Stinson of Bowling Green State University, contains more than 10,000 instances in which local police officers in the United States were arrested between 2005 and 2014. According to Stinson, the data reveals that lying by police is fairly common. News outlets including Talking Points Memo, The Wall Street Journal, and The Washington Post have consulted Stinson on topics relating to police misconduct.

"Support for the Henry A. Wallace Police Crime Public Database was provided by the Wallace Action Fund of the Tides Foundation on the recommendation of Randall Wallace."
