= Fresno City, California =

Fresno City
- Former settlement
- Location in California
- Coordinates: 36°39′40″N 120°15′40″W
- Country: United States
- State: California
- County: Fresno
- Elevation: 160 ft (50 m)

California Historical Landmark
- Reference no.: 488

Fresno City is a former settlement in Fresno County, California, United States. It was located at the head of navigation on Fresno Slough 2 miles (3.2 km) northwest of Tranquillity, at an elevation of 164 feet (50 m). The city was named after the Spanish word for the Oregon Ash trees that commonly grew along the river banks.

The town was started in 1855, at the head of navigation on Fresno Slough. A pier was built to accommodate flatboats and barges that could make it up the shallow slough. Warehouses, houses, and the Casa Blanca Hotel were built. In 1858, it became a station on the Butterfield Overland Mail. By 1860, the telegraph line from San Francisco arrived. Plans for a much larger town were contemplated but the Butterfield line closed in early 1861, the Great Flood of 1862 did great damage and the City was practically abandoned by 1865. A post office operated at Fresno City from 1860 to 1863. Today there are no traces of it left.

California Historical Landmark No. 488 was erected with a bronze plaque by the Fresno County Historical Association in 1952:

FRESNO CITY

'Fresno City' gradually arose at the head of navigation of the Fresno Slough, and existed from approximately 1855 to 1875 - today there are no traces of it left. In 1872, the 'City of Fresno,' later the county seat, was established about 30 miles to the northeast, on the newly built Central Pacific Railroad.

Location: On Fresno Slough, 0.8 miles north of James Road, from Tranquillity, then 1.3 miles northwest on Levee Road (dirt), Tranquillity.

Vandals removed the plaque and destroyed much of the marker which was located on Whites Bridge Road near Tranquility.
