= List of Department of Labor appointments by Donald Trump =

Key
Appointees serving in offices that did not require Senate confirmation.
Appointees confirmed by the Senate who are currently serving or served through the entire term.
Appointees awaiting Senate confirmation.
Appointees serving in an acting capacity.
Appointees who have left office after confirmation or offices which have been disbanded.
Nominees who were withdrawn prior to being confirmed or assuming office.

== Appointments (first administration) ==
Office	Nominee	Assumed office	Left office
Secretary of Labor	Eugene Scalia	September 30, 2019 (Confirmed September 26, 2019, 53–44)	January 20, 2021
Secretary of Labor	Patrick Pizzella	July 20, 2019	September 30, 2019
Secretary of Labor	Alexander Acosta	April 28, 2017 (Confirmed April 27, 2017, 60–38)	July 19, 2019
Secretary of Labor	Andrew Puzder	Nomination withdrawn by the President on February 28, 2017	
Deputy Secretary of Labor	Patrick Pizzella	April 17, 2018 (Confirmed April 12, 2018, 50–48)	January 20, 2021
Solicitor of Labor	Kate S. O'Scannlain	January 2, 2018 (Confirmed December 21, 2017, voice vote)	January 20, 2021
Chief Financial Officer of Labor	James E. Williams	May 18, 2018 (Confirmed March 22, 2018, voice vote)	January 20, 2021
Assistant Secretary of Labor (Congressional and Intergovernmental Affairs)	Katherine Brunett McGuire	January 2, 2018 (Confirmed December 21, 2017, voice vote)	January 25, 2019
Assistant Secretary of Labor (Disability Employment Policy)	Julie Hocker	Nomination lapsed and returned to the President on January 3, 2021	
Assistant Secretary of Labor (Employee Benefits)	Preston Rutledge	January 18, 2018 (Confirmed December 21, 2017, voice vote)	May 2020
Assistant Secretary of Labor (Employment and Training)	John Pallasch	July 24, 2019 (Confirmed July 11, 2019, 54–39)	January 20, 2021
Assistant Secretary of Labor (Mine Safety and Health)	David Zatezalo	November 30, 2017 (Confirmed November 15, 2017, 52–46)	January 20, 2021
Assistant Secretary of Labor (Occupational Safety and Health)	Scott A. Mugno	Nomination withdrawn by the President on May 23, 2019	
Assistant Secretary of Labor (Policy)	Bryan Jarrett	Nomination lapsed and returned to the President on January 3, 2019	
Assistant Secretary of Labor (Veterans' Employment and Training)	John Lowry III	January 6, 2020 (Confirmed November 21, 2019, voice vote)	January 20, 2021
Assistant Secretary of Labor (Administration and Management)	G. Bryan Slater	October 2017 (Appointed September 12, 2017)	January 20, 2021
Assistant Secretary of Labor (Public Affairs)	Jeffrey Y. Grappone	August 2017 (Appointed August 22, 2017)	2019
Inspector General of the United States Department of Labor	Larry D. Turner	June 22, 2020	December 7, 2021
Bureau of Labor Statistics
Commissioner of the Bureau of Labor Statistics	William Beach	March 28, 2019 (Confirmed March 13, 2019, 55–44)	March 12, 2023
Wage and Hour Division
Administrator of the Wage and Hour Division	Cheryl Marie Stanton	April 29, 2019 (Confirmed April 10, 2019, 53–45)	January 20, 2021
Pension Benefit Guaranty Corporation
Director of the Pension Benefit Guaranty Corporation	Gordon Hartogensis	May 15, 2019 (Confirmed April 30, 2019, 72–27)	April 30, 2024

== Appointments (second administration) ==
Office	Nominee	Assumed office	Left office
Secretary of Labor	Keith Sonderling	October 2, 2026 (Confirmed September 30, 2026, 47–41)	
Secretary of Labor	Keith Sonderling	April 20, 2026	October 2, 2026
Secretary of Labor	Lori Chavez-DeRemer	March 11, 2025 (Confirmed March 10, 2025, 67–32)	April 20, 2026
Secretary of Labor	Vince Micone	January 20, 2025	March 11, 2025
Deputy Secretary of Labor	Keith Sonderling	March 14, 2025 (Confirmed March 12, 2025, 53–46)	October 2, 2026
Solicitor of Labor	Jonathan Berry	November 5, 2025 (Confirmed* October 7, 2025, 51–47); *En bloc confirmation of 107 nominees.	
Solicitor of Labor	Jonathan Snare	February 24, 2025	November 5, 2025
Chief Financial Officer of Labor	David Brian Castillo	November 5, 2025 (Confirmed* October 7, 2025, 51–47); *En bloc confirmation of 107 nominees.	
Assistant Secretary of Labor for Employee Benefits	Daniel Aronowitz	November 5, 2025 (Confirmed* September 18, 2025, 51–44); *En bloc confirmation of 48 nominees.	
Assistant Secretary of Labor for Congressional and Intergovernmental Affairs	Daniel Bonham	Nomination withdrawn by the President on April 27, 2026	
Assistant Secretary of Labor for Employment and Training	Henry Mack III	December 19, 2025 (Confirmed* December 18, 2025, 53–43); *En bloc confirmation of 97 nominees.	
Assistant Secretary of Labor for Policy	Rosario Palmieri	January 7, 2026 (Confirmed* December 18, 2025, 53–43); *En bloc confirmation of 97 nominees.	
Assistant Secretary of Labor for Disability Employment Policy	Julie Hocker	November 5, 2025 (Confirmed* October 7, 2025, 51–47); *En bloc confirmation of 107 nominees.	
Assistant Secretary of Labor for Occupational Safety and Health	David Keeling	November 5, 2025 (Confirmed* October 7, 2025, 51–47); *En bloc confirmation of 107 nominees.	
Assistant Secretary of Labor for Occupational Safety and Health	Amanda Wood Laihow	March 12, 2025	November 5, 2025
Assistant Secretary of Labor for Mine Safety and Health	Wayne Palmer	November 5, 2025 (Confirmed* October 7, 2025, 51–47); *En bloc confirmation of 107 nominees.	
Assistant Secretary of Labor (Veterans' Employment and Training)	Jeremiah Workman	January 6, 2026 (Confirmed* December 18, 2025, 53–43); *En bloc confirmation of 97 nominees.	
Inspector General of the United States Department of Labor	Anthony D'Esposito	January 5, 2026 (Confirmed* December 18, 2025, 53–43); *En bloc confirmation of 97 nominees.	
Inspector General of the United States Department of Labor	Luiz A. Santos	January 24, 2025	July 2025
Wage and Hour Division
Administrator of the Wage and Hour Division	Andrew Rogers	November 5, 2025 (Confirmed* October 7, 2025, 51–47); *En bloc confirmation of 107 nominees.	
Administrator of the Wage and Hour Division	Donald M. Harrison, III	April 1, 2025	November 5, 2025
Bureau of Labor Statistics
Commissioner of the Bureau of Labor Statistics	Brett Matsumoto	August 11, 2026 (Confirmed* August 7, 2026, 51–47); *En bloc confirmation of 74 nominees.	
Commissioner of the Bureau of Labor Statistics	E.J. Antoni	Nomination withdrawn by the President on September 30, 2025	
Commissioner of the Bureau of Labor Statistics	William J. Wiatrowski	August 1, 2025	August 11, 2026

== Notes ==
=== Confirmation votes ===
Confirmations by roll call vote (first administration)

Confirmations by voice vote (first administration)

Confirmations by roll call vote (second administration)

Confirmations by voice vote (second administration)
