= List of new members of the 118th United States Congress =

The 118th United States Congress began on January 3, 2023. There were seven new senators (two Democrats, five Republicans) and 74 new representatives (34 Democrats, 40 Republicans), as well as one new delegate (a Republican), at the start of its first session. Additionally, five senators (four Democrats, one Republican) and nine representatives (five Democrats, four Republicans) have taken office in order to fill vacancies during the 118th Congress before it ended on January 3, 2025.

Due to redistricting after the 2020 census, 18 representatives were elected from newly established congressional districts.

The president of the House Democratic freshman class is Robert Garcia of California, while the president of the House Republican freshman class is Russell Fry of South Carolina. Additionally, the Democratic Freshmen Leadership Representative is Jasmine Crockett of Texas, and the Republican's freshmen liaison is Erin Houchin of Indiana.

== Senate ==
=== Took office January 3, 2023 ===
| State | Image | Senator | Seniority | Switched party | Prior background | Birth year | Ref |
|---|---|---|---|---|---|---|---|
| Alabama | | Katie Britt (R) | 7th (100th overall) | No; Open seat; replaced Richard Shelby (R) | CEO of the Business Council of Alabama; Chief of staff to Senator Richard Shelby | 1982 | |
| Missouri | | Eric Schmitt (R) | 6th (99th overall) | No; Open seat; replaced Roy Blunt (R) | Missouri Attorney General; State Treasurer of Missouri; Missouri Senate | 1975 | |
| North Carolina | | Ted Budd (R) | 3rd (96th overall) | No; Open seat; replaced Richard Burr (R) | U.S. House of Representatives (Note: Elected to the 115th Congress, serving from 2017 to 2023 in North Carolina's 13th district.) | 1971 | |
| Ohio | | JD Vance (R) | 5th (98th overall) | No; Open seat; replaced Rob Portman (R) | Venture capitalist U.S. Marine Corps Corporal | 1984 | |
| Oklahoma | | Markwayne Mullin (R) | 2nd (95th overall) | No; Open seat; replaced Jim Inhofe (R) | U.S. House of Representatives (Note: Elected to the 113th Congress, serving from 2013 to 2023 in Oklahoma's 2nd district.) | 1977 | |
| Pennsylvania | | John Fetterman (D) | 4th (97th overall) | Yes; Open seat; replaced Pat Toomey (R) | Lieutenant Governor of Pennsylvania; Mayor of Braddock | 1969 | |
| Vermont | | Peter Welch (D) | 1st (94th overall) | No; Open seat; replaced Patrick Leahy (D) | U.S. House of Representatives (Note: Elected to the 110th Congress, serving from 2007 to 2023 in Vermont's at-large district.); President pro tempore of the Vermont Senate | 1947 | |

=== Took office during the 118th Congress ===
| State | Image | Senator | Took office | Switched party | Prior background | Birth year | Ref |
|---|---|---|---|---|---|---|---|
| Nebraska | | Pete Ricketts (R) | January 23, 2023 | No; Appointed; replaced Ben Sasse (R) | Governor of Nebraska; COO of TD Ameritrade; Co-owner of the Chicago Cubs | 1964 | |
| California | | Laphonza Butler (D) | October 3, 2023 | No; Appointed; replaced Dianne Feinstein (D) | President of EMILY's List; UC Board of Regents; President of SEIU Local 2015 | 1979 | |
| New Jersey | | George Helmy (D) | September 9, 2024 | No; Appointed; replaced Bob Menendez (D) | Chief of staff to Governor Phil Murphy; Port Authority of New York and New Jersey | 1979 | |
| New Jersey | | Andy Kim (D) | December 9, 2024 | No; Open seat; replaced George Helmy (D) (Note: In New Jersey, Helmy did not run to finish the final two months of the current term.) | U.S. House of Representatives (Note: Elected to the 116th Congress, serving from 2019 to 2024 in New Jersey's 3rd congressional district.); U.S. National Security Council | 1982 | |
| California | | Adam Schiff (D) | December 9, 2024 | No; Open seat; replaced Laphonza Butler (D) (Note: In California, there were two ballot boxes, a special election to fill the seat for the final two months of this congress, and a general election for a full term starting with the 119th Congress. Butler did not run to finish the final two months of the current term.) | U.S. House of Representatives (Note: Elected to the 107th Congress, serving from 2001 to 2024 (California's 27th congressional district from 2001 to 2003, 29th district from 2003 to 2013, 28th district from 2013 to 2023, and 30th district from 2023 to 2024.)); California Senate | 1960 | |

== House of Representatives ==
=== Took office January 3, 2023 ===
| District | Image | Representative | Switched party | Prior background | Birth year | Ref |
|---|---|---|---|---|---|---|
| Alabama 5 | | Dale Strong (R) | No; Open seat; replaced Mo Brooks (R) | Chair of the Madison County Commission | 1970 | |
| Arizona 2 | | Eli Crane (R) | Yes; Defeated Tom O'Halleran (D) | U.S. Navy SEAL | 1980 | |
| Arizona 6 | | Juan Ciscomani (R) | Yes; Open seat; replaced Ann Kirkpatrick (D) | Vice Chair of the Arizona-Mexico Commission; Senior advisor to Governor Doug Ducey | 1982 | |
| California 3 | | Kevin Kiley (R) | Yes; Open seat; replaced John Garamendi (D), who was redistricted | California State Assembly | 1985 | |
| California 13 | | John Duarte (R) | Yes; Open seat; replaced Barbara Lee (D), who was redistricted | Nurseryman | 1966 | |
| California 15 | | Kevin Mullin (D) | No; Open seat; replaced Jackie Speier (D) | Speaker pro tempore of the California State Assembly | 1970 | |
| California 37 | | Sydney Kamlager-Dove (D) | No; Open seat; replaced Karen Bass (D) | California State Senate; California State Assembly | 1972 | |
| California 42 | | Robert Garcia (D) | No; Open seat; replaced Lucille Roybal-Allard (D) | Mayor of Long Beach; Long Beach City Council | 1977 | |
| Colorado 7 | | Brittany Pettersen (D) | No; Open seat; replaced Ed Perlmutter (D) | Colorado Senate; Colorado House of Representatives | 1981 | |
| Colorado 8 | | Yadira Caraveo (D) | New seat Constituency established | Colorado House of Representatives | 1980 | |
| Florida 4 | | Aaron Bean (R) | No; Open seat; replaced John Rutherford (R), who was redistricted | President pro tempore of the Florida Senate; Florida House of Representatives | 1967 | |
| Florida 7 | | Cory Mills (R) | Yes; Open seat; replaced Stephanie Murphy (D) | Defense Business Board; U.S. Army | 1980 | |
| Florida 10 | | Maxwell Frost (D) | No; Open seat; replaced Val Demings (D) | Activist | 1997 | |
| Florida 13 | | Anna Paulina Luna (R) | Yes; Open seat; replaced Charlie Crist (D) | Political commentator U.S. Air Force | 1989 | |
| Florida 15 | | Laurel Lee (R) | No; Open seat; replaced Scott Franklin (R), who was redistricted | Secretary of State of Florida | 1974 | |
| Florida 23 | | Jared Moskowitz (D) | No; Open seat; replaced Ted Deutch (D) | Broward County Commission; Florida Director of Emergency Management; Florida House of Representatives | 1980 | |
| Georgia 6 | | Rich McCormick (R) | Yes; Open seat; replaced Lucy McBath (D), who was redistricted | Emergency physician U.S. Navy Commander | 1968 | |
| Georgia 10 | | Mike Collins (R) | No; Open seat; replaced Jody Hice (R) | Businessman | 1967 | |
| Hawaii 2 | | Jill Tokuda (D) | No; Open seat; replaced Kai Kahele (D) | Hawaii Senate | 1976 | |
| Illinois 1 | | Jonathan Jackson (D) | No; Open seat; replaced Bobby Rush (D) | Businessman; Activist | 1966 | |
| Illinois 3 | | Delia Ramirez (D) | No; Open seat; replaced Marie Newman (D), who was redistricted and defeated in a primary | Illinois House of Representatives | 1983 | |
| Illinois 13 | | Nikki Budzinski (D) | Yes; Open seat; replaced Rodney Davis (R), who was redistricted and defeated in a primary | Chief of staff to OMB Director Shalanda Young | 1977 | |
| Illinois 17 | | Eric Sorensen (D) | No; Open seat; replaced Cheri Bustos (D) | Meteorologist | 1976 | |
| Indiana 9 | | Erin Houchin (R) | No; Open seat; replaced Trey Hollingsworth (R) | Indiana Senate | 1976 | |
| Iowa 3 | | Zach Nunn (R) | Yes; Defeated Cindy Axne (D) | Iowa Senate; Iowa House of Representatives; U.S. Air Force Lieutenant Colonel | 1979 | |
| Kentucky 3 | | Morgan McGarvey (D) | No; Open seat; replaced John Yarmuth (D) | Minority Leader of the Kentucky Senate | 1979 | |
| Maryland 4 | | Glenn Ivey (D) | No; Open seat; replaced Anthony Brown (D) | Prince George's County State's Attorney; Chair of the Maryland Public Service Commission | 1961 | |
| Michigan 3 | | Hillary Scholten (D) | Yes; Replaced Peter Meijer (R), who was defeated in a primary | Attorney | 1982 | |
| Michigan 10 | | John James (R) | No; Open seat; replaced Lisa McClain (R), who was redistricted | Businessman; U.S. Army Captain | 1981 | |
| Michigan 13 | | Shri Thanedar (D) | No; Open seat; replaced Rashida Tlaib (D), who was redistricted | Michigan House of Representatives | 1955 | |
| Mississippi 4 | | Mike Ezell (R) | No; Defeated Steven Palazzo (R) in a primary | Jackson County Sheriff | 1959 | |
| Missouri 4 | | Mark Alford (R) | No; Open seat; replaced Vicky Hartzler (R) | Television news journalist | 1963 | |
| Missouri 7 | | Eric Burlison (R) | No; Open seat; replaced Billy Long (R) | Missouri Senate; Missouri House of Representatives | 1976 | |
| Montana 1 | | Ryan Zinke (R) | New seat Constituency re-established (Note: From 1913 to 1993, Montana had two congressional seats, after which, the 2nd district was eliminated and the remaining seat was elected at-large.) | U.S. Secretary of the Interior; U.S. House of Representatives (Note: Previously elected to the 114th Congress, serving from 2015 to 2017 in Montana's at-large district.); Montana Senate; U.S. Navy SEAL Team Six | 1961 | |
| New Jersey 7 | | Thomas Kean Jr. (R) | Yes; Defeated Tom Malinowski (D) | Minority Leader of the New Jersey Senate; New Jersey General Assembly | 1968 | |
| New Jersey 8 | | Rob Menendez (D) | No; Open seat; replaced Albio Sires (D) | Port Authority of New York and New Jersey | 1985 | |
| New Mexico 2 | | Gabe Vasquez (D) | Yes; Defeated Yvette Herrell (R) | Las Cruces City Council | 1984 | |
| New York 1 | | Nick LaLota (R) | No; Open seat; replaced Lee Zeldin (R) | Businessman | 1978 | |
| New York 3 | | George Santos (R) | Yes; Open seat; replaced Tom Suozzi (D) | Disputed | 1988 | |
| New York 4 | | Anthony D'Esposito (R) | Yes; Open seat; replaced Kathleen Rice (D) | Hempstead Town Council | 1982 | |
| New York 10 | | Dan Goldman (D) | No; Defeated Mondaire Jones (D) in a primary | Attorney | 1976 | |
| New York 17 | | Mike Lawler (R) | Yes; Defeated Sean Patrick Maloney (D) | New York State Assembly | 1986 | |
| New York 19 | | Marc Molinaro (R) | Yes; Open seat; replaced Pat Ryan (D), who was redistricted | Dutchess County Executive; New York State Assembly; Dutchess County Legislature; Mayor of Tivoli | 1975 | |
| New York 22 | | Brandon Williams (R) | No; Open seat; replaced John Katko (R) | Businessman; U.S. Navy Lieutenant | 1967 | |
| New York 23 | | Nick Langworthy (R) | No; Open seat; replaced Joe Sempolinski (R) | Chair of the New York Republican State Committee; Chair of the Erie County Republican Party | 1981 | |
| North Carolina 1 | | Don Davis (D) | No; Open seat; replaced G. K. Butterfield (D) | North Carolina Senate; Mayor of Snow Hill; U.S. Air Force | 1971 | |
| North Carolina 4 | | Valerie Foushee (D) | No; Open seat; replaced David Price (D) | North Carolina Senate; North Carolina House of Representatives | 1956 | |
| North Carolina 11 | | Chuck Edwards (R) | No; Defeated Madison Cawthorn (R) in a primary | North Carolina Senate | 1960 | |
| North Carolina 13 | | Wiley Nickel (D) | Yes; Open seat; replaced Ted Budd (R), who was redistricted | North Carolina Senate | 1975 | |
| North Carolina 14 | | Jeff Jackson (D) | New seat Constituency established | North Carolina Senate; U.S. Army Major | 1982 | |
| Ohio 1 | | Greg Landsman (D) | Yes; Defeated Steve Chabot (R) | Cincinnati City Council | 1976 | |
| Ohio 7 | | Max Miller (R) | No; Open seat; replaced Bob Gibbs (R) | Aide to President Donald Trump; U.S. Marine Corps Corporal | 1988 | |
| Ohio 13 | | Emilia Sykes (D) | No; Open seat; replaced Tim Ryan (D) | Minority Leader of the Ohio House of Representatives | 1986 | |
| Oklahoma 2 | | Josh Brecheen (R) | No; Open seat; replaced Markwayne Mullin (R) | Oklahoma Senate | 1979 | |
| Oregon 4 | | Val Hoyle (D) | No; Open seat; replaced Peter DeFazio (D) | Oregon Commissioner of Labor; Majority Leader of the Oregon House of Representatives | 1964 | |
| Oregon 5 | | Lori Chavez-DeRemer (R) | Yes; Replaced Kurt Schrader (D), who was defeated in a primary | Mayor of Happy Valley | 1968 | |
| Oregon 6 | | Andrea Salinas (D) | New seat Constituency established | Oregon House of Representatives | 1969 | |
| Pennsylvania 12 | | Summer Lee (D) | No; Open seat; replaced Mike Doyle (D) | Pennsylvania House of Representatives | 1987 | |
| Pennsylvania 17 | | Chris Deluzio (D) | No; Open seat; replaced Conor Lamb (D) | Attorney; U.S. Navy Lieutenant | 1984 | |
| Rhode Island 2 | | Seth Magaziner (D) | No; Open seat; replaced James Langevin (D) | General Treasurer of Rhode Island | 1983 | |
| South Carolina 7 | | Russell Fry (R) | No; Defeated Tom Rice (R) in a primary | South Carolina House of Representatives | 1985 | |
| Tennessee 5 | | Andy Ogles (R) | Yes; Open seat; replaced Jim Cooper (D) | Mayor of Maury County | 1971 | |
| Texas 1 | | Nathaniel Moran (R) | No; Open seat; replaced Louie Gohmert (R) | Smith County Judge; Tyler City Council | 1974 | |
| Texas 3 | | Keith Self (R) | No; Open seat; replaced Van Taylor (R) | Collin County Judge; U.S. Army Special Forces | 1953 | |
| Texas 8 | | Morgan Luttrell (R) | No; Open seat; replaced Kevin Brady (R) | Businessman; U.S. Navy SEAL | 1975 | |
| Texas 15 | | Monica De La Cruz (R) | Yes; Open seat; replaced Vicente Gonzalez (D), who was redistricted | Insurance agent | 1974 | |
| Texas 30 | | Jasmine Crockett (D) | No; Open seat; replaced Eddie Bernice Johnson (D) | Texas House of Representatives; Bowie County Public Defender | 1981 | |
| Texas 35 | | Greg Casar (D) | No; Open seat; replaced Lloyd Doggett (D), who was redistricted | Austin City Council | 1989 | |
| Texas 38 | | Wesley Hunt (R) | New seat Constituency established | U.S. Army | 1981 | |
| Vermont at-large | | Becca Balint (D) | No; Open seat; replaced Peter Welch (D) | President pro tempore of the Vermont Senate | 1968 | |
| Virginia 2 | | Jen Kiggans (R) | Yes; Defeated Elaine Luria (D) | Virginia Senate; U.S. Navy | 1971 | |
| Washington 3 | | Marie Gluesenkamp Perez (D) | Yes; Replaced Jaime Herrera Beutler (R), who was defeated in a primary | Business owner | 1988 | |
| Wisconsin 3 | | Derrick Van Orden (R) | Yes; Open seat; replaced Ron Kind (D) | U.S. Navy SEAL | 1969 | |
| Wyoming at-large | | Harriet Hageman (R) | No; Defeated Liz Cheney (R) in a primary | Attorney | 1962 | |

==== Non-voting delegates ====
| District | Image | Delegate | Switched party | Prior background | Birth year | Ref |
|---|---|---|---|---|---|---|
| Guam at-large | | James Moylan (R) | Yes; Open seat; replaced Michael San Nicolas (D) | Legislature of Guam; U.S. Army | 1962 | |

=== Took office during the 118th Congress ===
| District | Image | Representative | Took office | Switched party | Prior background | Birth year | Ref |
|---|---|---|---|---|---|---|---|
| Virginia 4 | | Jennifer McClellan (D) | March 7, 2023 | No; Succeeded Donald McEachin (D) | Virginia Senate; Virginia House of Delegates | 1972 | |
| Rhode Island 1 | | Gabe Amo (D) | November 13, 2023 | No; Succeeded David Cicilline (D) | White House Office of Intergovernmental Affairs; Office of Public Liaison | 1987 | |
| Utah 2 | | Celeste Maloy (R) | November 28, 2023 | No; Succeeded Chris Stewart (R) | Legal counsel for Representative Chris Stewart; Deputy Washington County Attorney; Natural Resources Conservation Service | 1981 | |
| New York 3 | | Tom Suozzi (D) | February 28, 2024 | Yes; Succeeded George Santos (R) | U.S. House of Representatives (Note: Previously elected to the 115th Congress, serving from 2017 to 2023.); Nassau County Executive | 1962 | |
| New York 26 | | Tim Kennedy (D) | May 6, 2024 | No; Succeeded Brian Higgins (D) | New York State Senate; Erie County Legislature | 1976 | |
| California 20 | | Vince Fong (R) | June 3, 2024 | No; Succeeded Kevin McCarthy (R) | California State Assembly; Staffer for Representative Kevin McCarthy | 1979 | |
| Ohio 6 | | Michael Rulli (R) | June 25, 2024 | No; Succeeded Bill Johnson (R) | Ohio Senate; Leetonia Exempted Village School District | 1969 | |
| Colorado 4 | | Greg Lopez (R) | July 8, 2024 | No; Succeeded Ken Buck (R) | Small Business Administration; Mayor of Parker; U.S. Air Force | 1964 | |
| New Jersey 10 | | LaMonica McIver (D) | September 23, 2024 | No; Succeeded Donald Payne Jr. (D) | President of the Newark Municipal Council | 1986 | |
| Texas 18 | | Erica Lee Carter (D) | November 12, 2024 | No; Succeeded Sheila Jackson Lee (D) | Harris County Department of Education | 1980 | |
| Wisconsin 8 | | Tony Wied (R) | November 12, 2024 | No; Succeeded Mike Gallagher (R) | Business owner | 1976 | |

== See also ==
- List of United States representatives in the 118th Congress
- List of United States senators in the 118th Congress

== Notes ==
| Preceded by New members of the 117th Congress | New members of the 118th Congress; 2023–2025 | Succeeded by New members of the 119th Congress |
