= List of new members of the 119th United States Congress =

The 119th United States Congress began on January 3, 2025. There were nine new senators (four Democrats, five Republicans) and 63 new representatives (33 Democrats, 30 Republicans), as well as two new delegates (a Democrat and a Republican), at the start of its first session. Additionally, four senators (all Republicans) and nine representatives (four Democrats, five Republicans) have taken office in order to fill vacancies during the 119th Congress.

The president of the House Democratic freshman class is Yassamin Ansari of Arizona, while the president of the House Republican freshman class is Brandon Gill of Texas. Additionally, the Democratic freshmen leadership representative is Kristen McDonald Rivet of Michigan, and the Republican's freshmen liaison is Riley Moore of West Virginia.

== Senate ==
=== Took office January 3, 2025 ===
State	Image	Senator	Seniority	Switched party	Prior background	Birth year	Ref
Arizona		Ruben Gallego (D)	1st (91st overall)	Yes; Open seat; replaced Kyrsten Sinema (I)	U.S. House of Representatives (Note: Elected to the 114th Congress, serving from 2015 to 2023 in Arizona's 7th congressional district and from 2023 to 2025 in Arizona's 3rd congressional district.); Arizona House of Representatives; U.S. Marine Corps Reserve Corporal	1979	
Delaware		Lisa Blunt Rochester (D)	3rd (93rd overall)	No; Open seat; replaced Tom Carper (D)	U.S. House of Representatives (Note: Elected to the 115th Congress, serving from 2017 to 2025 in Delaware's at-large congressional district.); Delaware secretary of labor	1962	
Indiana		Jim Banks (R)	2nd (92nd overall)	No; Open seat; replaced Mike Braun (R)	U.S. House of Representatives (Note: Elected to the 115th Congress, serving from 2017 to 2025 in Indiana's 3rd congressional district.); Indiana Senate	1979	
Maryland		Angela Alsobrooks (D)	8th (98th overall)	No; Open seat; replaced Ben Cardin (D)	Prince George's County Executive; Prince George's County state attorney	1971	
Michigan		Elissa Slotkin (D)	5th (95th overall)	No; Open seat; replaced Debbie Stabenow (D)	U.S. House of Representatives (Note: Elected to the 116th Congress, serving from 2019 to 2025 in Michigan's 7th congressional district.); Assistant Secretary of Defense (ISA); Central Intelligence Agency	1976	
Montana		Tim Sheehy (R)	9th (99th overall)	Yes; Defeated Jon Tester (D)	CEO of Bridger Aerospace; Aerial firefighter U.S. Navy SEAL	1985	
Ohio (Class 1)		Bernie Moreno (R)	7th (97th overall)	Yes; Defeated Sherrod Brown (D)	Car sales businessman	1967	
Pennsylvania		Dave McCormick (R)	6th (96th overall)	Yes; Defeated Bob Casey Jr. (D)	Under Secretary of the Treasury; Under Secretary of Commerce; CEO of Bridgewater Associates	1965	
Utah		John Curtis (R)	4th (94th overall)	No; Open seat; replaced Mitt Romney (R)	U.S. House of Representatives (Note: Elected to the 115th Congress, serving from 2017 to 2025 in Utah's 3rd congressional district.); Mayor of Provo	1960	

=== Took office during the 119th Congress ===
State	Image	Senator	Took office	Switched party	Prior background	Birth year	Ref
West Virginia		Jim Justice (R)	January 14, 2025 (Note: Justice was duly elected in November 2024, but chose to delay the start of his service in the Senate by a few days until the end of his term as Governor of West Virginia.)	Yes; Open seat; replaced Joe Manchin (I)	Governor of West Virginia; Owner of the Greenbrier	1951	
Florida		Ashley Moody (R)	January 21, 2025	No; Appointed; replaced Marco Rubio (R)	Attorney General of Florida; Judge of the Thirteenth Judicial Circuit Court of Florida	1975	
Ohio (Class 3)		Jon Husted (R)	January 21, 2025	No; Appointed; replaced JD Vance (R)	Lieutenant Governor of Ohio; Ohio secretary of state Ohio Senate; Speaker of the Ohio House of Representatives	1967	
Oklahoma		Alan Armstrong (R)	March 24, 2026	No; Appointed; replaced Markwayne Mullin (R)	CEO of Williams Companies; Director of Constellation Energy	1962	
South Carolina		Darline Graham (R)	July 14, 2026	No; Appointed; replaced Lindsey Graham (R)	South Carolina Commission for the Blind; South Carolina State Workforce Development Board	1964	
Oklahoma		Kevin Hern (R)	November 30, 2026	No; Open seat; replacing Alan Armstrong (R) (Note: In Oklahoma, Armstrong did not run to finish the final months of the current term.)	U.S. House of Representatives (Note: Elected to the 116th Congress but took seat early in the 115th Congress, serving in the Oklahoma's 1st congressional district since 2018.); Businessman	1961	
Ohio (Class 3)		Sherrod Brown (D)	December 15, 2026	Yes; Defeated Jon Husted (R)	U.S. Senate (Note: Previously elected to the 110th Congress, serving from 2007 to 2025.); U.S. House of Representatives (Note: Elected to the 103rd Congress, serving from 1993 to 2007 in Ohio's 13th congressional district.); Secretary of State of Ohio; Ohio House of Representatives	1952	

== House of Representatives ==
=== Took office January 3, 2025 ===
District	Image	Representative	Switched party	Prior background	Birth year	Ref
Alabama 2		Shomari Figures (D)	Yes; Open seat, replaced Barry Moore (R), who was redistricted	Deputy chief of staff to U.S. Attorney General Merrick Garland	1985	
Alaska at-large		Nick Begich III (R)	Yes; Defeated Mary Peltola (D)	Software businessman Alaska Policy Forum Board	1977	
Arizona 3		Yassamin Ansari (D)	No; Open seat; replaced Ruben Gallego (D)	Phoenix City Council	1992	
Arizona 8		Abraham Hamadeh (R)	No; Open seat; replaced Debbie Lesko (R)	Prosecutor; U.S. Army intelligence officer	1991	
California 12		Lateefah Simon (D)	No; Open seat; replaced Barbara Lee (D)	Bay Area Rapid Transit Board of Directors	1977	
California 13		Adam Gray (D)	Yes; Defeated John Duarte (R)	California State Assembly	1977	
California 16		Sam Liccardo (D)	No; Open seat; replaced Anna Eshoo (D)	Mayor of San Jose; San Jose City Council	1970	
California 27		George Whitesides (D)	Yes; Defeated Mike Garcia (R)	CEO of Virgin Galactic; Chief of Staff of NASA	1974	
California 29		Luz Rivas (D)	No; Open seat; replaced Tony Cárdenas (D)	California State Assembly	1974	
California 30		Laura Friedman (D)	No; Open seat; replaced Adam Schiff (D)	California State Assembly; Mayor of Glendale	1966	
California 31		Gil Cisneros (D)	No; Open seat; replaced Grace Napolitano (D)	Under Secretary of Defense (P&R); U.S. House of Representatives (Note: Previously elected to the 116th Congress, serving from 2019 to 2021 in California's 39th congressional district.); U.S. Navy Lieutenant Commander	1971	
California 45		Derek Tran (D)	Yes; Defeated Michelle Steel (R)	Attorney; U.S. Army	1980	
California 47		Dave Min (D)	No; Open seat; replaced Katie Porter (D)	California State Senate	1976	
Colorado 3		Jeff Hurd (R)	No; Open seat; replaced Lauren Boebert (R) (Note: Incumbent Republican Lauren Boebert ran in the 4th district, in which in turn was held by incumbent Greg Lopez, who retired at the end of the previous Congress.)	Attorney	1979	
Colorado 5		Jeff Crank (R)	No; Open seat; replaced Doug Lamborn (R)	Outdoorsman; Radio show host	1967	
Colorado 8		Gabe Evans (R)	Yes; Defeated Yadira Caraveo (D)	Colorado House of Representatives; Arvada Police Department; U.S. Army Captain	1986	
Delaware at-large		Sarah McBride (D)	No; Open seat; replaced Lisa Blunt Rochester (D)	Delaware Senate	1990	
Florida 8		Mike Haridopolos (R)	No; Open seat; replaced Bill Posey (R)	President of the Florida Senate; Florida House of Representatives	1970	
Georgia 3		Brian Jack (R)	No; Open seat; replaced Drew Ferguson (R)	White House director of political affairs	1988	
Indiana 3		Marlin Stutzman (R)	No; Open seat; replaced Jim Banks (R)	U.S. House of Representatives (Note: Previously elected to the 111th Congress, serving from 2010 to 2017.); Indiana Senate; Indiana House of Representatives	1976	
Indiana 6		Jefferson Shreve (R)	No; Open seat; replaced Greg Pence (R)	Indianapolis City-County Council	1965	
Indiana 8		Mark Messmer (R)	No; Open seat; replaced Larry Bucshon (R)	Majority Leader of the Indiana Senate; Indiana House of Representatives	1967	
Kansas 2		Derek Schmidt (R)	No; Open seat; replaced Jake LaTurner (R)	Kansas attorney general Kansas Senate	1968	
Louisiana 6		Cleo Fields (D)	Yes; Open seat; replaced Garret Graves (R)	U.S. House of Representatives (Note: Previously elected to the 103rd Congress, serving from 1993 to 1997 in Louisiana's 4th congressional district.); Louisiana Senate	1962	
Maryland 2		Johnny Olszewski (D)	No; Open seat; replaced Dutch Ruppersberger (D)	Baltimore County executive Maryland House of Delegates	1982	
Maryland 3		Sarah Elfreth (D)	No; Open seat; replaced John Sarbanes (D)	Maryland Senate	1988	
Maryland 6		April McClain Delaney (D)	No; Open seat; replaced David Trone (D)	Lawyer; U.S. Department of Commerce official	1964	
Michigan 7		Tom Barrett (R)	Yes; Open seat; replaced Elissa Slotkin (D)	Michigan Senate; Michigan House of Representatives; Michigan Army National Guard	1981	
Michigan 8		Kristen McDonald Rivet (D)	No; Open seat; replaced Dan Kildee (D)	Michigan Senate	1970	
Minnesota 3		Kelly Morrison (DFL)	No; Open seat; replaced Dean Phillips (DFL)	Minnesota Senate; Minnesota House of Representatives	1969	
Missouri 1		Wesley Bell (D)	No; Defeated Cori Bush (D) in a primary	St. Louis County prosecuting attorney	1974	
Missouri 3		Bob Onder (R)	No; Open seat; replaced Blaine Luetkemeyer (R)	Missouri Senate; Missouri House of Representatives	1962	
Montana 2		Troy Downing (R)	No; Open seat; replaced Matt Rosendale (R)	Montana state auditor	1967	
New Hampshire 2		Maggie Goodlander (D)	No; Open seat; replaced Annie Kuster (D)	Deputy Assistant Attorney General for the Antitrust Division	1986	
New Jersey 3		Herb Conaway (D)	No; Open seat; replaced Andy Kim (D)	New Jersey General Assembly	1963	
New Jersey 9		Nellie Pou (D)	No; Open seat; replaced Bill Pascrell (D)	New Jersey Senate; New Jersey General Assembly	1956	
New York 4		Laura Gillen (D)	Yes; Defeated Anthony D'Esposito (R)	Town Supervisor of Hempstead	1969	
New York 16		George Latimer (D)	No; Defeated Jamaal Bowman (D) in a primary	Westchester County Executive; New York State Senate; New York State Assembly; Westchester County Board of Legislators	1953	
New York 19		Josh Riley (D)	Yes; Defeated Marc Molinaro (R)	Lawyer	1981	
New York 22		John Mannion (D)	Yes; Defeated Brandon Williams (R)	New York State Senate	1968	
North Carolina 6		Addison McDowell (R)	Yes; Open seat, replaced Kathy Manning (D), who was redistricted	Healthcare lobbyist	1994	
North Carolina 8		Mark Harris (R)	No; Open seat; replaced Dan Bishop (R)	Pastor	1966	
North Carolina 10		Pat Harrigan (R)	No; Open seat; replaced Patrick McHenry (R)	Firearms manufacturer	1987	
North Carolina 13		Brad Knott (R)	Yes; Open seat; replaced Wiley Nickel (D)	Attorney	1986	
North Carolina 14		Tim Moore (R)	Yes; Open seat; replaced Jeff Jackson (D)	Speaker of the North Carolina House of Representatives	1970	
North Dakota at-large		Julie Fedorchak (R)	No; Open seat; replaced Kelly Armstrong (R)	North Dakota Public Service Commission	1968	
Ohio 2		David Taylor (R)	No; Open seat; replaced Brad Wenstrup (R)	Attorney	1969	
Oregon 3		Maxine Dexter (D)	No; Open seat; replaced Earl Blumenauer (D)	Oregon House of Representatives	1972	
Oregon 5		Janelle Bynum (D)	Yes; Defeated Lori Chavez-DeRemer (R)	Oregon House of Representatives	1975	
Pennsylvania 7		Ryan Mackenzie (R)	Yes; Defeated Susan Wild (D)	Pennsylvania House of Representatives	1982	
Pennsylvania 8		Rob Bresnahan (R)	Yes; Defeated Matt Cartwright (D)	Businessman	1990	
South Carolina 3		Sheri Biggs (R)	No; Open seat; replaced Jeff Duncan (R)	Nurse practitioner	1970	
Texas 12		Craig Goldman (R)	No; Open seat; replaced Kay Granger (R)	Texas House of Representatives	1968	
Texas 18		Sylvester Turner (D)	No; Open seat; replaced Erica Lee Carter (D) (Note: Elected in the special election to replace Sheila Jackson Lee.)	Mayor of Houston; Texas House of Representatives	1954	
Texas 26		Brandon Gill (R)	No; Open seat; replaced Michael C. Burgess (R)	Conservative media website founder	1994	
Texas 32		Julie Johnson (D)	No; Open seat; replaced Colin Allred (D)	Texas House of Representatives	1966	
Utah 3		Mike Kennedy (R)	No; Open seat; replaced John Curtis (R)	Utah Senate; Utah House of Representatives	1969	
Virginia 5		John McGuire (R)	No; Defeated Bob Good (R) in a primary	Virginia Senate; Virginia House of Delegates	1968	
Virginia 7		Eugene Vindman (D)	No; Open seat; replaced Abigail Spanberger (D)	U.S. Army Lieutenant Colonel; Legal advisor to the National Security Council	1975	
Virginia 10		Suhas Subramanyam (D)	No; Open seat; replaced Jennifer Wexton (D)	Virginia Senate; Virginia House of Delegates	1986	
Washington 5		Michael Baumgartner (R)	No; Open seat; replaced Cathy McMorris Rodgers (R)	Treasurer of Spokane County; Washington Senate	1975	
Washington 6		Emily Randall (D)	No; Open seat; replaced Derek Kilmer (D)	Washington Senate	1985	
West Virginia 2		Riley Moore (R)	No; Open seat; replaced Alex Mooney (R)	West Virginia state treasurer West Virginia House of Delegates	1980	

==== Non-voting delegates ====
District	Image	Delegate	Switched party	Prior background	Birth year	Ref
Northern Mariana Islands at-large		Kimberlyn King-Hinds (R)	Yes; Open seat; replaced Gregorio Sablan (D)	Chair of the Commonwealth Ports Authority Board of Directors	1975	
Puerto Rico at-large		Pablo Hernández Rivera (PDP/D)	Yes; Open seat; replaced Jenniffer González-Colón (PNP/R)	Popular Democratic Party official	1991	

=== Took office during the 119th Congress ===
District	Image	Representative	Took office	Switched party	Prior background	Birth year	Ref
Florida 1		Jimmy Patronis (R)	April 2, 2025	No; Succeeded Matt Gaetz (R)	Chief Financial Officer of Florida; Florida House of Representatives	1972	
Florida 6		Randy Fine (R)	April 2, 2025	No; Succeeded Mike Waltz (R)	Florida Senate; Florida House of Representatives	1974	
Virginia 11		James Walkinshaw (D)	September 10, 2025	No; Succeeded Gerry Connolly (D)	Fairfax County Board of Supervisors	1982	
Arizona 7		Adelita Grijalva (D)	November 12, 2025 (Note: Grijalva was duly elected on September 23, 2025, although her swearing-in was delayed by Speaker Mike Johnson amid the government shutdown and the process of the Epstein files vote.)	No; Succeeded Raúl Grijalva (D)	Pima County Board of Supervisors	1970	
Tennessee 7		Matt Van Epps (R)	December 4, 2025	No; Succeeded Mark Green (R)	Tennessee Department of General Services; U.S. Army	1983	
Texas 18		Christian Menefee (D)	February 2, 2026	No; Succeeded Sylvester Turner (D)	Harris County Attorney	1988	
Georgia 14		Clay Fuller (R)	April 14, 2026	No; Succeeded Marjorie Taylor Greene (R)	Lookout Mountain District Attorney; Georgia Air National Guard	1981	
New Jersey 11		Analilia Mejia (D)	April 20, 2026	No; Succeeded Mikie Sherrill (D)	Non-profit organization co-director	1977	
California 1		James Gallagher (R)	June 10, 2026	No; Succeeded Doug LaMalfa (R)	Minority Leader of the California State Assembly; Sutter County Board of Supervisors	1981	
Georgia 13		Everton Blair (D)	September 1, 2026	No; Succeeded David Scott (D)	Gwinnett County School Board	1992	
California 14		Aisha Wahab (D)	September 2, 2026	No; Succeeded Eric Swalwell (D)	California State Senate; Hayward City Council	1987	

== Notes ==
Preceded by New members of the 118th Congress	New members of the 119th Congress; 2025–2027	Succeeded by New members of the 120th Congress
