= Laura Gillen =

American politician and attorney (born 1969)

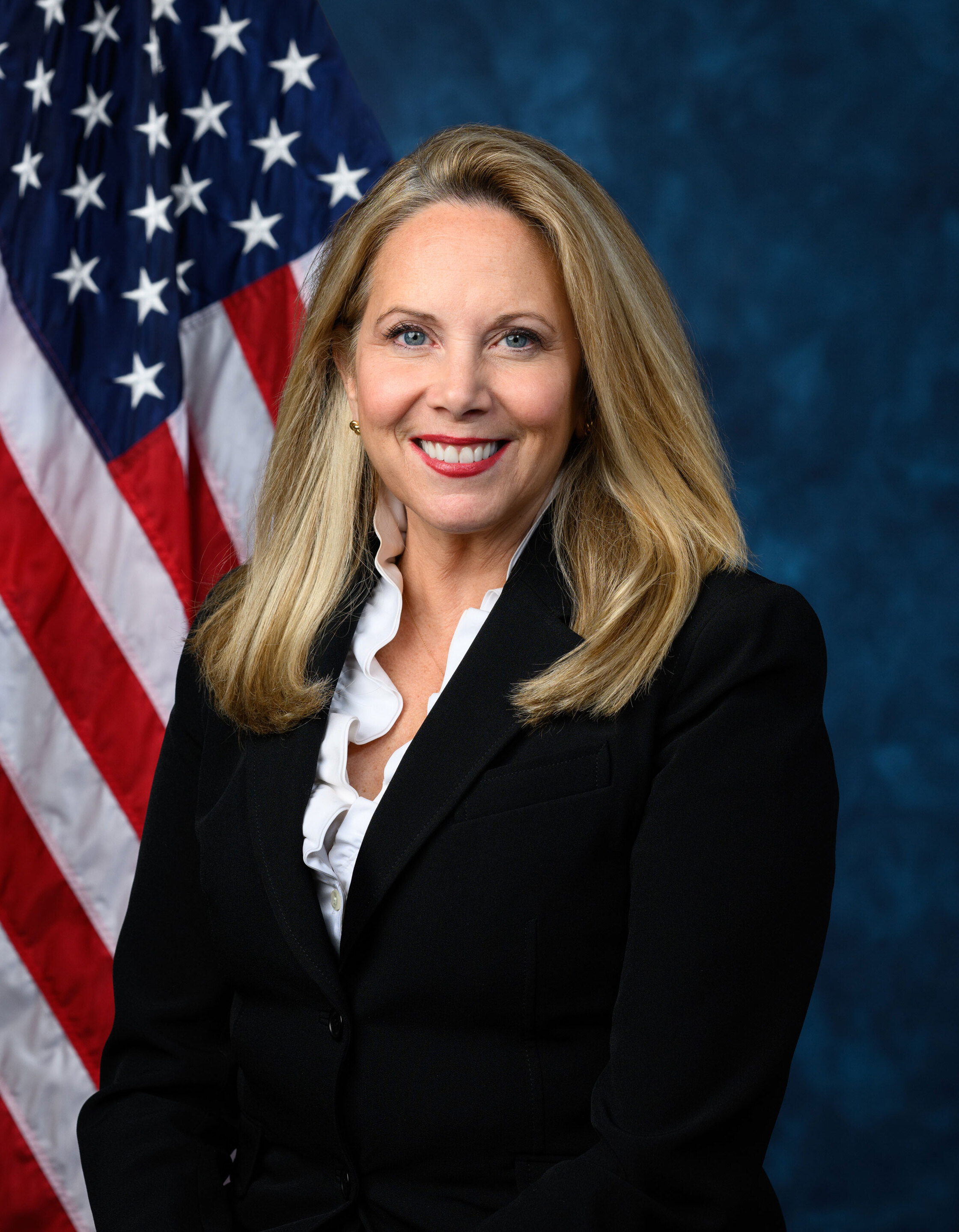
- Official portrait, 2024

Member of the U.S. House of Representatives from New York's 4th district
- Incumbent
- Assumed office January 3, 2025
- Preceded by: Anthony D'Esposito

Town Supervisor of Hempstead
- In office January 2018 – January 2020
- Preceded by: Anthony Santino
- Succeeded by: Donald Clavin

Personal details
- Born: Laura Anne Gillen; July 10, 1969 (age 57) Rockville Centre, New York, U.S.
- Party: Democratic
- Spouse: Christopher Finegan
- Children: 4
- Education: Georgetown University (BA); New York University (JD)
- Website: House website Campaign website

Laura Anne Gillen (born July 10, 1969) is an American politician and attorney serving as the U.S. representative for New York's 4th congressional district since 2025. A member of the Democratic Party, she previously served as the town supervisor of Hempstead, New York. Her district includes central and southern Nassau County, a suburban area on Long Island.

== Early life and education ==
Gillen was born on July 10, 1969, in Rockville Centre, New York, and grew up in Baldwin with her four siblings. She attended Sacred Heart Academy in Hempstead before earning a Bachelor of Arts in political science and government from Georgetown University in 1991.

After graduating, Gillen volunteered with GMHC (formerly Gay Men's Health Crisis) during the height of the AIDS epidemic. Gillen then worked at an entertainment agency before traveling abroad. She became a scuba diving instructor in Thailand and later volunteered with Mother Teresa's Missionaries of Charity in Kolkata, India.

Upon returning to the United States, Gillen enrolled at the New York University School of Law, where she earned a Juris Doctor in 2000.

== Legal career ==
Gillen began her legal career as a litigator at Cahill Gordon & Reindel, where she was active in the firm's pro bono program representing victims of domestic violence. Gillen left in 2005 to practice commercial litigation at the Uniondale-based law firm Westerman Ball Ederer Miller Zucker & Sharfstein. Following her time in local government, Gillen worked as an adjunct professor at Hofstra University Law School.

== Early political career ==
In 2017, Gillen narrowly defeated incumbent Anthony J. Santino for Hempstead Town Supervisor, becoming the first Democrat in over 100 years elected to the position. In that election, Gillen was outspent by $1.2 million dollars and won by a margin of 2,268 votes.

During her 2017 campaign for supervisor, Gillen criticized Santino's treatment of fellow town board members Bruce Blakeman and Erin King-Sweeney. The two town board members took issue with a Santino proposal to restrict board members from taking more than $125,000 in outside income. While Santino denied it, the two attorneys argued that it was an attempt to throw them off the board. Blakeman would later cross party lines to endorse Gillen in October.

During her time as Supervisor, Gillen managed a budget of nearly $500 million and led the operations of all town departments. Gillen introduced a package of ethics reform legislation to battle corruption in town politics, specifically nepotism in hiring. She passed critical legislation relating to sexual harassment and veterans benefits. In May 2018, Gillen released a five year capital plan which included rehabilitation of a town 311 facility and a water testing lab and $160 million in capital highway spending.

Gillen lost her 2019 bid for reelection as supervisor to Republican Donald X. Clavin Jr., then the town's receiver of taxes.

== U.S. House of Representatives ==
=== Elections ===
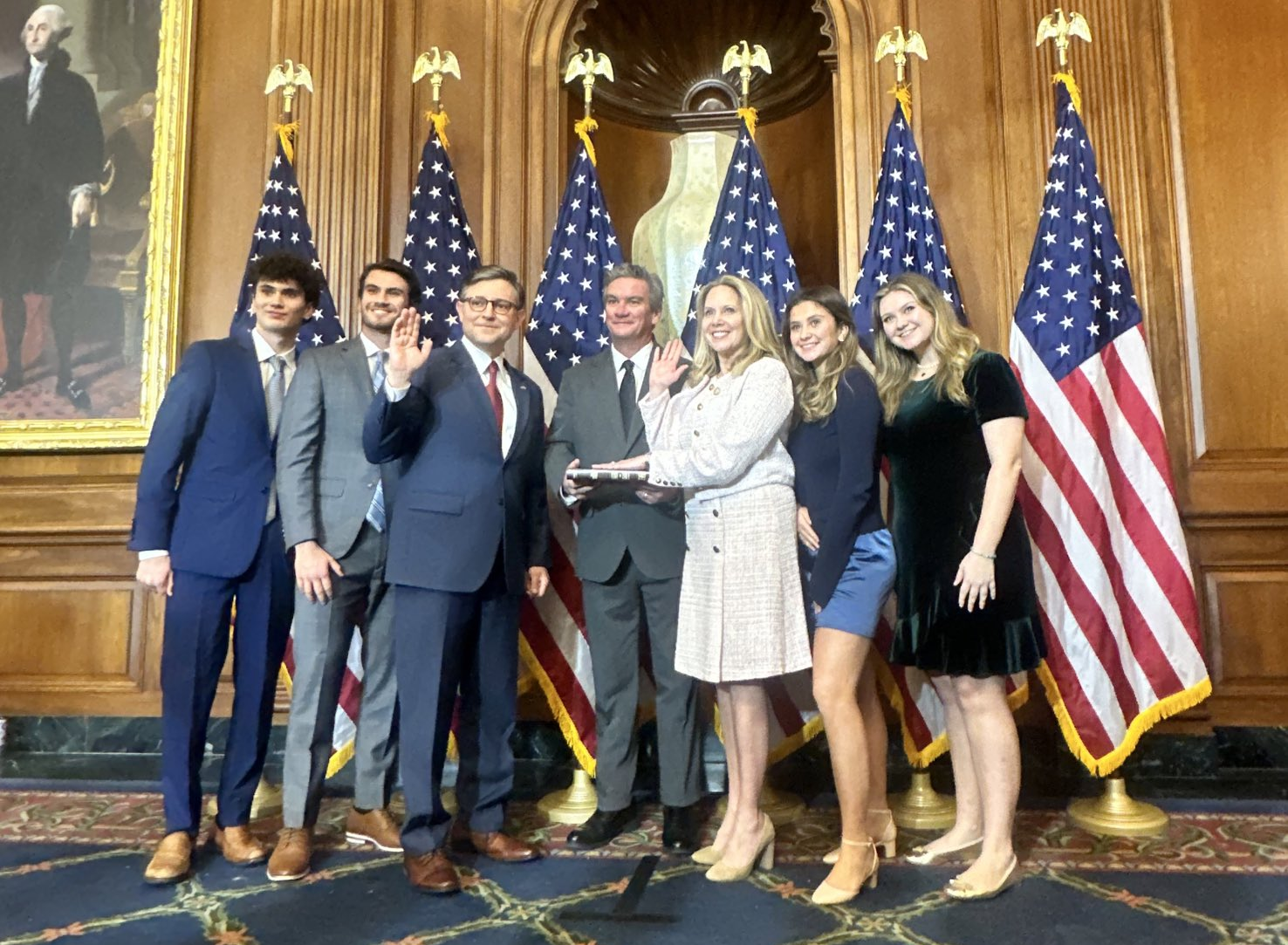
Gillen being sworn into the 119th Congress, 2025

==== 2022 ====
In 2022, Gillen ran for New York's 4th congressional district in the 2022 United States House of Representatives elections. The seat was being vacated by incumbent Democratic Rep. Kathleen Rice. Gillen won the Democratic primary, but lost the general election to Republican Anthony D'Esposito.

==== 2024 ====
Gillen announced she would run against D'Esposito again in 2024. She defeated him in the general election by over 8,000 votes, flipping the seat. During her campaign, she said she opposed the implementation of congestion pricing in lower Manhattan. Gillen supported securing the southern border, gun safety and background checks, a two-state solution for Israel and protecting abortion access.

==== 2026 ====
Gillen won her 2026 primary after running unopposed. She defeated Republican Jeanine Driscoll in the general election on November 3rd. Her margin of victory exceeded the results of her 2024 election.

=== Tenure ===
Gillen was sworn in to the House of Representatives on January 3, 2025, at the start of the 119th Congress.

The first bill Gillen introduced in the House of Representatives was H.R.1689 "to [direct] the Department of Homeland Security to designate Haiti for temporary protected status (TPS) for 18 months." The bill passed by a bipartisan vote of 224 - 204, with 10 Republican votes, in the House of Representatives and awaits a vote in the Senate. Gillen has been an outspoken advocate for the extension of TPS for Haitians.

Gillen has been named one of the most bipartisan members of Congress, and has one of the most centrist voting records in Congress according to Bridge Grades, UCLA Voteview, and CQ Roll Call. Gillen has introduced multiple bipartisan bills, each with a Republican co-sponsor, making her one of the only members in Congress with a 100% bipartisan bill-sponsorship record. These bipartisan bills include the Cost of Living Tax Cut Act (H.R. 9179), the Stop Auto Fraud Act (H.R. 10269), the Lowering Commuting Costs Act (H.R. 9179), the Officer Wellness and Peer Support Act (H.R. 8776), the Feed Hungry Kids Act (H.R. 5129), the Access to Family Building Act (H.R. 2049) and the Drunk Driving Prevention and Envorcement Act (H.R. 6704).

Gillen voted against the One Big Beautiful Bill Act (H.R.1), the SAVE Act (H.R.22), and the Born Alive Abortion Survivors Act (H.R. 21).

Gillen is an original cosponsor of the Dignity Act of 2025 (H.R. 4393), bipartisan legislation intorudced by ten Democrats and ten Republicans to "[address] various immigration-related issues, including by requiring higher pay for U.S. Border Patrol agents, deferring the removal of eligible individuals without lawful immigration status, and implementing a mandatory electronic employment eligibility verification system patterned off the E-Verify system."

In the FY26 congressional appropriations cycle, Gillen secured $13,948,144 in community project funding for New York's 4th congressional district, including upgrades to the Hempstead Village's Water Treatment facility, renovations to local public libraries in Lakeview and Franklin Square, and a new Tower Ladder Truck for the City of Long Beach Fire Department. Gillen also helped secure $42 million in federal funding for Nassau County's NICE bus service as well as $586,018 for road safety in the Village of Hempstead through the 2025 Safe Streets and Roads for All (SS4A) Grant Program. The funding will help Hempstead enact their comprehensive Safety Action Plan. Gillen assisted Nassau County faith-based institutions secure over $2 million in funding from the Nonprofit Security Grant Program.

In 2025, Gillen was among 46 House Democrats who joined all Republicans to vote for the Laken Riley Act.

On March 6, 2025, Gillen was among 10 Democrats in Congress who joined all of their Republican colleagues in voting to censure Democratic congressman Al Green for speaking during Donald Trump's State of the Union Address.

Gillen was the first elected House Democrat to publicly decline to support Zohran Mamdani after he won the 2025 New York City Democratic mayoral primary, stating that "his entire campaign has been built on unachievable promises and higher taxes, which is the last thing New York needs."

In December 2025, NBC News and The New York Times reported that Gillen had voted against a bill to reopen the federal government and then touted the money the bill delivered to her district. After the federal government was reopened, primarily with Republican votes, after a 43-day shutdown, Gillen was among Democrats who "claimed credit for some provisions in the bill."

On January 22, 2026, she voted to pass HR 7147 funding bill for the Department of Homeland Security, including funding for United States Immigration and Customs Enforcement (ICE). In May 2026, Gillen was one of 8 Democrats in the House who voted to pass the Stopping Indoctrination and Protecting Kids Act which would ban the teaching of concepts related to transgender topics, and prohibit schools from allowing children to change their preferred gender pronouns or permit trans children to use their preferred bathrooms or locker rooms without parental consent.

In June 2026, Gillen was one of 10 House Democrats to sign onto the pro-capitalist, anti-socialist initiative, Promise to America after three candidates backed by the Democratic Socialists of America won Democratic primaries.

On November 10, 2026, Gillen missed the House vote on the impeachment of Pete Hegseth as Secretary of Defense. Gillen said she wanted to vote for Hegseth's impeachment but was stuck in traffic.

=== Committee assignments ===
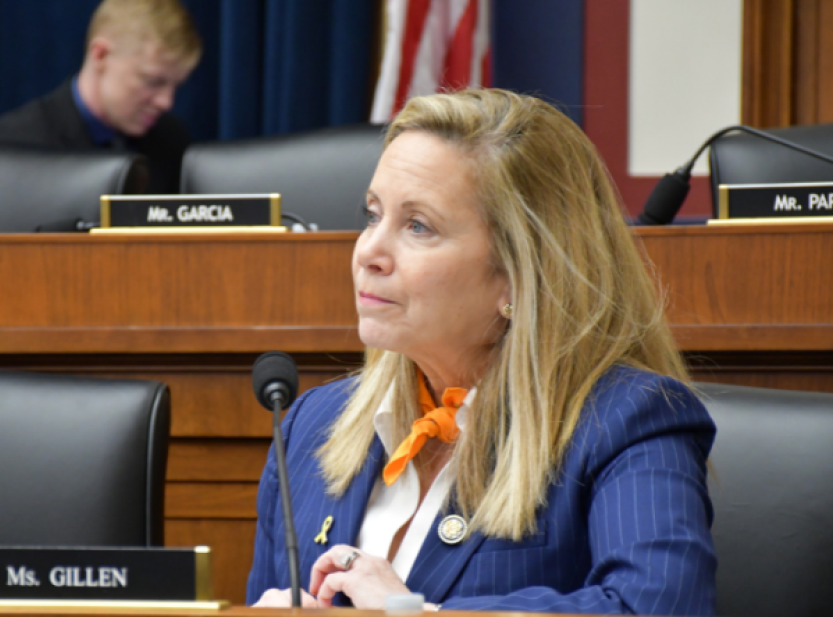
Gillen on the Committee on Transportation and Infrastructure

For the 119th Congress:

- Committee on Transportation and Infrastructure
  - Subcommittee on Highways and Transit
  - Subcommittee on Aviation
- Committee on Science, Space, and Technology
  - Subcommittee on Water Resources and Environment
  - Subcommittee on Space and Aeronautics

=== Caucus memberships ===
- Congressional Lowering Utility Bills Caucus
- Congressional Equality Caucus
- New Democrat Coalition
- Black Maternal Health Caucus
- Labor Caucus
- Congressional Ukraine Caucus

== Personal life ==
Gillen is married to Christopher Finegan, a producer. They have four children and live in Rockville Centre, New York. She is Catholic.

== Electoral history ==
US House election, 2022: New York District 4
Party	Candidate	Votes	%
Republican	Anthony D'Esposito	129,353	47.63%
Conservative	Anthony D'Esposito	11,269	4.15%
Total	Anthony D'Esposito	140,622	51.78%
Democratic	Laura Gillen	130,871	48.19%
Write-in		67	0.02%
Total votes		271,560	100%
Republican gain from Democratic			

US House election, 2024: New York District 4
Party	Candidate	Votes	%
Democratic	Laura Gillen	190,569	50.75%
Common Sense Party	Laura Gillen	1,191	0.32%
Total	Laura Gillen	191,760	51.07%
Republican	Anthony D'Esposito	169,641	45.18%
Conservative	Anthony D'Esposito	13,516	3.60%
Total	Anthony D'Esposito (incumbent)	183,157	48.77%
Write-in		601	0.16%
Total votes		375,518	100%
Democratic gain from Republican			

== See also ==
- List of new members of the 119th United States Congress

U.S. House of Representatives
Preceded by Anthony D'Esposito	Member of the U.S. House of Representatives from New York's 4th congressional district 2025–present	Incumbent
U.S. order of precedence (ceremonial)
Preceded by Brandon Gill	United States representatives by seniority 382nd	Succeeded by Craig Goldman
