= List of United States representatives in the 118th Congress =

This is a complete list of United States representatives during the 118th United States Congress, which ran from January 3, 2023, through January 3, 2025, ordered by seniority. (Note: Delegates are non-voting members and representatives are voting members of the United States House of Representatives.)

== Seniority list ==
Rank	Member	Party	District	Seniority date	Previous service (Note: Members elected with substantial prior service receive credit for part of that service when calculating seniority.)	Committee and leadership positions
1	Hal Rogers	R	Kentucky 5	January 3, 1981		Dean of the House
2	Chris Smith	R	New Jersey 4	January 3, 1981		
3	Steny Hoyer	D	Maryland 5	May 19, 1981		
4	Marcy Kaptur	D	Ohio 9	January 3, 1983		
5	Nancy Pelosi	D	California 11	June 2, 1987		
6	Frank Pallone	D	New Jersey 6	November 8, 1988		Ranking Member: Energy and Commerce
7	Richard Neal	D	Massachusetts 1	January 3, 1989		Ranking Member: Ways and Means
8	Rosa DeLauro	D	Connecticut 3	January 3, 1991		Ranking Member: Appropriations
9	Maxine Waters	D	California 43	January 3, 1991		Ranking Member: Financial Services
10	Jerry Nadler	D	New York 12	November 3, 1992		Ranking Member: Judiciary
11	Sanford Bishop	D	Georgia 2	January 3, 1993		
12	Ken Calvert	R	California 41	January 3, 1993		
13	Jim Clyburn	D	South Carolina 6	January 3, 1993		Assistant Democratic Leader until February 14, 2024
14	Anna Eshoo	D	California 16	January 3, 1993		
15	Bobby Scott	D	Virginia 3	January 3, 1993		Ranking Member: Education and the Workforce
16	Nydia Velázquez	D	New York 7	January 3, 1993		Ranking Member: Small Business
17	Bennie Thompson	D	Mississippi 2	April 13, 1993		Ranking Member: Homeland Security
18	Frank Lucas	R	Oklahoma 3	May 10, 1994		Chair: Science, Space and Technology
19	Lloyd Doggett	D	Texas 37	January 3, 1995		
20	Sheila Jackson Lee	D	Texas 18	January 3, 1995		Died on July 19, 2024
21	Zoe Lofgren	D	California 18	January 3, 1995		Ranking Member: Science, Space and Technology
22	Earl Blumenauer	D	Oregon 3	May 21, 1996		
23	Robert Aderholt	R	Alabama 4	January 3, 1997		
24	Danny Davis	D	Illinois 7	January 3, 1997		
25	Diana DeGette	D	Colorado 1	January 3, 1997		
26	Kay Granger	R	Texas 12	January 3, 1997		Chair: Appropriations until April 10, 2024
27	Jim McGovern	D	Massachusetts 2	January 3, 1997		Ranking Member: Rules
28	Bill Pascrell	D	New Jersey 9	January 3, 1997		Died on August 21, 2024
29	Brad Sherman	D	California 32	January 3, 1997		
30	Adam Smith	D	Washington 9	January 3, 1997		Ranking Member: Armed Services
31	Gregory Meeks	D	New York 5	February 3, 1998		Ranking Member: Foreign Affairs
32	Barbara Lee	D	California 12	April 7, 1998		
33	John B. Larson	D	Connecticut 1	January 3, 1999		
34	Grace Napolitano	D	California 31	January 3, 1999		
35	Jan Schakowsky	D	Illinois 9	January 3, 1999		
36	Mike Simpson	R	Idaho 2	January 3, 1999		
37	Mike Thompson	D	California 4	January 3, 1999		
38	Pete Sessions	R	Texas 17	January 3, 2021	1997–2019	
39	Sam Graves	R	Missouri 6	January 3, 2001		Chair: Transportation and Infrastructure
40	Rick Larsen	D	Washington 2	January 3, 2001		Ranking Member: Transportation and Infrastructure
41	Betty McCollum	D	Minnesota 4	January 3, 2001		
42	Adam Schiff	D	California 30	January 3, 2001		Ranking Member: Intelligence
43	Stephen Lynch	D	Massachusetts 8	October 16, 2001		
44	Joe Wilson	R	South Carolina 2	December 18, 2001		
45	Michael C. Burgess	R	Texas 26	January 3, 2003		Chair: Rules from April 10, 2024
46	John Carter	R	Texas 31	January 3, 2003		
47	Tom Cole	R	Oklahoma 4	January 3, 2003		Chair: Rules until April 10, 2024; Chair: Appropriations from April 10, 2024
48	Mario Díaz-Balart	R	Florida 26	January 3, 2003		
49	Raúl Grijalva	D	Arizona 7	January 3, 2003		Ranking Member: Natural Resources
50	Mike Rogers	R	Alabama 3	January 3, 2003		Chair: Armed Services
51	Dutch Ruppersberger	D	Maryland 2	January 3, 2003		
52	Linda Sánchez	D	California 38	January 3, 2003		
53	David Scott	D	Georgia 13	January 3, 2003		Ranking Member: Agriculture
54	Mike Turner	R	Ohio 10	January 3, 2003		Chair: Intelligence
55	Darrell Issa	R	California 48	January 3, 2021	2001–2019	
56	Emanuel Cleaver	D	Missouri 5	January 3, 2005		
57	Jim Costa	D	California 21	January 3, 2005		
58	Henry Cuellar	D	Texas 28	January 3, 2005		
59	Virginia Foxx	R	North Carolina 5	January 3, 2005		Chair: Education and the Workforce
60	Al Green	D	Texas 9	January 3, 2005		
61	Brian Higgins	D	New York 26	January 3, 2005		Resigned on February 2, 2024
62	Michael McCaul	R	Texas 10	January 3, 2005		Chair: Foreign Affairs
63	Patrick McHenry	R	North Carolina 10	January 3, 2005		Chair: Financial Services
64	Cathy McMorris Rodgers	R	Washington 5	January 3, 2005		Chair: Energy and Commerce
65	Gwen Moore	D	Wisconsin 4	January 3, 2005		
66	Debbie Wasserman Schultz	D	Florida 25	January 3, 2005		
67	Doris Matsui	D	California 7	March 8, 2005		
68	Gus Bilirakis	R	Florida 12	January 3, 2007		
69	Vern Buchanan	R	Florida 16	January 3, 2007		
70	Kathy Castor	D	Florida 14	January 3, 2007		
71	Yvette Clarke	D	New York 9	January 3, 2007		
72	Steve Cohen	D	Tennessee 9	January 3, 2007		
73	Joe Courtney	D	Connecticut 2	January 3, 2007		
74	Hank Johnson	D	Georgia 4	January 3, 2007		
75	Jim Jordan	R	Ohio 4	January 3, 2007		Chair: Judiciary
76	Doug Lamborn	R	Colorado 5	January 3, 2007		
77	Kevin McCarthy	R	California 20	January 3, 2007		Speaker of the House until October 3, 2023; Resigned on December 31, 2023
78	John Sarbanes	D	Maryland 3	January 3, 2007		
79	Adrian Smith	R	Nebraska 3	January 3, 2007		
80	Bob Latta	R	Ohio 5	December 11, 2007		
81	Rob Wittman	R	Virginia 1	December 11, 2007		
82	André Carson	D	Indiana 7	March 11, 2008		
83	Steve Scalise	R	Louisiana 1	May 3, 2008		Majority Leader
84	Gerry Connolly	D	Virginia 11	January 3, 2009		
85	Brett Guthrie	R	Kentucky 2	January 3, 2009		
86	Jim Himes	D	Connecticut 4	January 3, 2009		
87	Blaine Luetkemeyer	R	Missouri 3	January 3, 2009		
88	Tom McClintock	R	California 5	January 3, 2009		
89	Chellie Pingree	D	Maine 1	January 3, 2009		
90	Bill Posey	R	Florida 8	January 3, 2009		
91	Glenn Thompson	R	Pennsylvania 15	January 3, 2009		Chair: Agriculture
92	Paul Tonko	D	New York 20	January 3, 2009		
93	Mike Quigley	D	Illinois 5	April 7, 2009		
94	Judy Chu	D	California 28	July 14, 2009		
95	John Garamendi	D	California 8	November 3, 2009		
96	Tim Walberg	R	Michigan 5	January 3, 2011	2007–2009	
97	Bill Foster	D	Illinois 11	January 3, 2013	2008–2011	
98	Kweisi Mfume	D	Maryland 7	April 28, 2020	1987–1996	
99	Larry Bucshon	R	Indiana 8	January 3, 2011		
100	David Cicilline	D	Rhode Island 1	January 3, 2011		Resigned on May 31, 2023
101	Rick Crawford	R	Arkansas 1	January 3, 2011		
102	Scott DesJarlais	R	Tennessee 4	January 3, 2011		
103	Jeff Duncan	R	South Carolina 3	January 3, 2011		
104	Chuck Fleischmann	R	Tennessee 3	January 3, 2011		
105	Paul Gosar	R	Arizona 9	January 3, 2011		
106	Morgan Griffith	R	Virginia 9	January 3, 2011		
107	Andy Harris	R	Maryland 1	January 3, 2011		
108	Bill Huizenga	R	Michigan 4	January 3, 2011		
109	Bill Johnson	R	Ohio 6	January 3, 2011		Resigned on January 21, 2024
110	Bill Keating	D	Massachusetts 9	January 3, 2011		
111	Mike Kelly	R	Pennsylvania 16	January 3, 2011		
112	David Schweikert	R	Arizona 1	January 3, 2011		
113	Austin Scott	R	Georgia 8	January 3, 2011		
114	Terri Sewell	D	Alabama 7	January 3, 2011		
115	Daniel Webster	R	Florida 11	January 3, 2011		
116	Frederica Wilson	D	Florida 24	January 3, 2011		
117	Steve Womack	R	Arkansas 3	January 3, 2011		
118	Mark Amodei	R	Nevada 2	September 13, 2011		
119	Suzanne Bonamici	D	Oregon 1	January 31, 2012		
120	Suzan DelBene	D	Washington 1	November 6, 2012		
121	Thomas Massie	R	Kentucky 4	November 6, 2012		
122	Donald Payne Jr.	D	New Jersey 10	November 6, 2012		Died on April 24, 2024
123	Dina Titus	D	Nevada 1	January 3, 2013	2009–2011	
124	Andy Barr	R	Kentucky 6	January 3, 2013		
125	Joyce Beatty	D	Ohio 3	January 3, 2013		
126	Ami Bera	D	California 6	January 3, 2013		
127	Julia Brownley	D	California 26	January 3, 2013		
128	Tony Cárdenas	D	California 29	January 3, 2013		
129	Matt Cartwright	D	Pennsylvania 8	January 3, 2013		
130	Joaquin Castro	D	Texas 20	January 3, 2013		
131	Lois Frankel	D	Florida 22	January 3, 2013		
132	Richard Hudson	R	North Carolina 9	January 3, 2013		
133	Jared Huffman	D	California 2	January 3, 2013		
134	Hakeem Jeffries	D	New York 8	January 3, 2013		Minority Leader
135	David Joyce	R	Ohio 14	January 3, 2013		
136	Dan Kildee	D	Michigan 8	January 3, 2013		
137	Derek Kilmer	D	Washington 6	January 3, 2013		
138	Annie Kuster	D	New Hampshire 2	January 3, 2013		
139	Doug LaMalfa	R	California 1	January 3, 2013		
140	Grace Meng	D	New York 6	January 3, 2013		
141	Scott Perry	R	Pennsylvania 10	January 3, 2013		
142	Scott Peters	D	California 50	January 3, 2013		
143	Mark Pocan	D	Wisconsin 2	January 3, 2013		
144	Raul Ruiz	D	California 25	January 3, 2013		
145	Chris Stewart	R	Utah 2	January 3, 2013		Resigned on September 15, 2023
146	Eric Swalwell	D	California 14	January 3, 2013		
147	Mark Takano	D	California 39	January 3, 2013		Ranking Member: Veterans' Affairs
148	Juan Vargas	D	California 52	January 3, 2013		
149	Marc Veasey	D	Texas 33	January 3, 2013		
150	Ann Wagner	R	Missouri 2	January 3, 2013		
151	Randy Weber	R	Texas 14	January 3, 2013		
152	Brad Wenstrup	R	Ohio 2	January 3, 2013		
153	Roger Williams	R	Texas 25	January 3, 2013		Chair: Small Business
154	Robin Kelly	D	Illinois 2	April 9, 2013		
155	Jason Smith	R	Missouri 8	June 4, 2013		Chair: Ways and Means
156	Katherine Clark	D	Massachusetts 5	December 10, 2013		Minority Whip
157	Alma Adams	D	North Carolina 12	November 4, 2014		
158	Donald Norcross	D	New Jersey 1	November 4, 2014		
159	Ed Case	D	Hawaii 1	January 3, 2019	2002–2007	
160	Pete Aguilar	D	California 33	January 3, 2015		Democratic Caucus Chair
161	Rick Allen	R	Georgia 12	January 3, 2015		
162	Brian Babin	R	Texas 36	January 3, 2015		
163	Don Beyer	D	Virginia 8	January 3, 2015		
164	Mike Bost	R	Illinois 12	January 3, 2015		Chair: Veterans' Affairs
165	Brendan Boyle	D	Pennsylvania 2	January 3, 2015		Ranking Member: Budget
166	Ken Buck	R	Colorado 4	January 3, 2015		Resigned on March 22, 2024
167	Buddy Carter	R	Georgia 1	January 3, 2015		
168	Mark DeSaulnier	D	California 10	January 3, 2015		
169	Debbie Dingell	D	Michigan 6	January 3, 2015		
170	Tom Emmer	R	Minnesota 6	January 3, 2015		Majority Whip
171	Ruben Gallego	D	Arizona 3	January 3, 2015		
172	Garret Graves	R	Louisiana 6	January 3, 2015		
173	Glenn Grothman	R	Wisconsin 6	January 3, 2015		
174	French Hill	R	Arkansas 2	January 3, 2015		
175	Ted Lieu	D	California 36	January 3, 2015		
176	Barry Loudermilk	R	Georgia 11	January 3, 2015		
177	John Moolenaar	R	Michigan 2	January 3, 2015		
178	Alex Mooney	R	West Virginia 2	January 3, 2015		
179	Seth Moulton	D	Massachusetts 6	January 3, 2015		
180	Dan Newhouse	R	Washington 4	January 3, 2015		
181	Gary Palmer	R	Alabama 6	January 3, 2015		
182	David Rouzer	R	North Carolina 7	January 3, 2015		
183	Elise Stefanik	R	New York 21	January 3, 2015		Republican Conference Chairwoman
184	Norma Torres	D	California 35	January 3, 2015		
185	Bonnie Watson Coleman	D	New Jersey 12	January 3, 2015		
186	Bruce Westerman	R	Arkansas 4	January 3, 2015		Chair: Natural Resources
187	Trent Kelly	R	Mississippi 1	June 2, 2015		
188	Darin LaHood	R	Illinois 16	September 10, 2015		
189	Warren Davidson	R	Ohio 8	June 7, 2016		
190	James Comer	R	Kentucky 1	November 8, 2016		Chair: Oversight and Government Reform
191	Dwight Evans	D	Pennsylvania 3	November 8, 2016		
192	Brad Schneider	D	Illinois 10	January 3, 2017	2013–2015	
193	David Valadao	R	California 22	January 3, 2021	2013–2019	
194	Jodey Arrington	R	Texas 19	January 3, 2017		Chair: Budget
195	Don Bacon	R	Nebraska 2	January 3, 2017		
196	Jim Banks	R	Indiana 3	January 3, 2017		
197	Nanette Barragán	D	California 44	January 3, 2017		
198	Jack Bergman	R	Michigan 1	January 3, 2017		
199	Andy Biggs	R	Arizona 5	January 3, 2017		
200	Lisa Blunt Rochester	D	Delaware at-large	January 3, 2017		
201	Salud Carbajal	D	California 24	January 3, 2017		
202	Lou Correa	D	California 46	January 3, 2017		
203	Neal Dunn	R	Florida 2	January 3, 2017		
204	Adriano Espaillat	D	New York 13	January 3, 2017		
205	Drew Ferguson	R	Georgia 3	January 3, 2017		
206	Brian Fitzpatrick	R	Pennsylvania 1	January 3, 2017		
207	Matt Gaetz	R	Florida 1	January 3, 2017		Resigned on November 13, 2024
208	Mike Gallagher	R	Wisconsin 8	January 3, 2017		Resigned on April 20, 2024
209	Vicente Gonzalez	D	Texas 34	January 3, 2017		
210	Josh Gottheimer	D	New Jersey 5	January 3, 2017		
211	Clay Higgins	R	Louisiana 3	January 3, 2017		
212	Pramila Jayapal	D	Washington 7	January 3, 2017		
213	Mike Johnson	R	Louisiana 4	January 3, 2017		Speaker of the House from October 25, 2023
214	Ro Khanna	D	California 17	January 3, 2017		
215	Raja Krishnamoorthi	D	Illinois 8	January 3, 2017		
216	David Kustoff	R	Tennessee 8	January 3, 2017		
217	Brian Mast	R	Florida 21	January 3, 2017		
218	Jimmy Panetta	D	California 19	January 3, 2017		
219	Jamie Raskin	D	Maryland 8	January 3, 2017		Ranking Member: Oversight and Government Reform
220	John Rutherford	R	Florida 5	January 3, 2017		
221	Lloyd Smucker	R	Pennsylvania 11	January 3, 2017		
222	Darren Soto	D	Florida 9	January 3, 2017		
223	Ron Estes	R	Kansas 4	April 11, 2017		
224	Jimmy Gomez	D	California 34	June 6, 2017		
225	Ralph Norman	R	South Carolina 5	June 20, 2017		
226	John Curtis	R	Utah 3	November 7, 2017		
227	Debbie Lesko	R	Arizona 8	April 24, 2018		
228	Michael Cloud	R	Texas 27	June 30, 2018		
229	Troy Balderson	R	Ohio 12	August 7, 2018		
230	Kevin Hern	R	Oklahoma 1	November 6, 2018		
231	Joseph Morelle	D	New York 25	November 6, 2018		Ranking Member: House Administration
232	Mary Gay Scanlon	D	Pennsylvania 5	November 6, 2018		
233	Susan Wild	D	Pennsylvania 7	November 6, 2018		Ranking Member: Ethics
234	Steven Horsford	D	Nevada 4	January 3, 2019	2013–2015	
235	Tom Suozzi	D	New York 3	February 13, 2024	2017–2023	
236	Colin Allred	D	Texas 32	January 3, 2019		
237	Kelly Armstrong	R	North Dakota at-large	January 3, 2019		
238	Jim Baird	R	Indiana 4	January 3, 2019		
239	Tim Burchett	R	Tennessee 2	January 3, 2019		
240	Sean Casten	D	Illinois 6	January 3, 2019		
241	Ben Cline	R	Virginia 6	January 3, 2019		
242	Angie Craig	D	Minnesota 2	January 3, 2019		
243	Dan Crenshaw	R	Texas 2	January 3, 2019		
244	Jason Crow	D	Colorado 6	January 3, 2019		
245	Sharice Davids	D	Kansas 3	January 3, 2019		
246	Madeleine Dean	D	Pennsylvania 4	January 3, 2019		
247	Veronica Escobar	D	Texas 16	January 3, 2019		
248	Lizzie Fletcher	D	Texas 7	January 3, 2019		
249	Russ Fulcher	R	Idaho 1	January 3, 2019		
250	Chuy García	D	Illinois 4	January 3, 2019		
251	Sylvia Garcia	D	Texas 29	January 3, 2019		
252	Jared Golden	D	Maine 2	January 3, 2019		
253	Lance Gooden	R	Texas 5	January 3, 2019		
254	Mark Green	R	Tennessee 7	January 3, 2019		Chair: Homeland Security
255	Michael Guest	R	Mississippi 3	January 3, 2019		Chair: Ethics
256	Josh Harder	D	California 9	January 3, 2019		
257	Jahana Hayes	D	Connecticut 5	January 3, 2019		
258	Chrissy Houlahan	D	Pennsylvania 6	January 3, 2019		
259	Dusty Johnson	R	South Dakota at-large	January 3, 2019		
260	John Joyce	R	Pennsylvania 13	January 3, 2019		
261	Andy Kim	D	New Jersey 3	January 3, 2019		
262	Susie Lee	D	Nevada 3	January 3, 2019		
263	Mike Levin	D	California 49	January 3, 2019		
264	Lucy McBath	D	Georgia 7	January 3, 2019		
265	Dan Meuser	R	Pennsylvania 9	January 3, 2019		
266	Carol Miller	R	West Virginia 1	January 3, 2019		
267	Joe Neguse	D	Colorado 2	January 3, 2019		Assistant Democratic Leader from March 20, 2024
268	Alexandria Ocasio-Cortez	D	New York 14	January 3, 2019		
269	Ilhan Omar	D	Minnesota 5	January 3, 2019		
270	Chris Pappas	D	New Hampshire 1	January 3, 2019		
271	Greg Pence	R	Indiana 6	January 3, 2019		
272	Dean Phillips	D	Minnesota 3	January 3, 2019		
273	Katie Porter	D	California 47	January 3, 2019		
274	Ayanna Pressley	D	Massachusetts 7	January 3, 2019		
275	Guy Reschenthaler	R	Pennsylvania 14	January 3, 2019		
276	John Rose	R	Tennessee 6	January 3, 2019		
277	Chip Roy	R	Texas 21	January 3, 2019		
278	Kim Schrier	D	Washington 8	January 3, 2019		
279	Mikie Sherrill	D	New Jersey 11	January 3, 2019		
280	Elissa Slotkin	D	Michigan 7	January 3, 2019		
281	Abigail Spanberger	D	Virginia 7	January 3, 2019		
282	Greg Stanton	D	Arizona 4	January 3, 2019		
283	Pete Stauber	R	Minnesota 8	January 3, 2019		
284	Bryan Steil	R	Wisconsin 1	January 3, 2019		Chair: Administration
285	Greg Steube	R	Florida 17	January 3, 2019		
286	Haley Stevens	D	Michigan 11	January 3, 2019		
287	William Timmons	R	South Carolina 4	January 3, 2019		
288	Rashida Tlaib	D	Michigan 12	January 3, 2019		
289	Lori Trahan	D	Massachusetts 3	January 3, 2019		
290	David Trone	D	Maryland 6	January 3, 2019		
291	Lauren Underwood	D	Illinois 14	January 3, 2019		
292	Jeff Van Drew	R (Note: A party change does not affect seniority.)	New Jersey 2	January 3, 2019		
293	Michael Waltz	R	Florida 6	January 3, 2019		
294	Jennifer Wexton	D	Virginia 10	January 3, 2019		
295	Dan Bishop	R	North Carolina 8	September 10, 2019		
296	Greg Murphy	R	North Carolina 3	September 10, 2019		
297	Mike Garcia	R	California 27	May 12, 2020		
298	Tom Tiffany	R	Wisconsin 7	May 12, 2020		
299	Claudia Tenney	R	New York 24	February 11, 2021	2017–2019	
300	Jake Auchincloss	D	Massachusetts 4	January 3, 2021		
301	Cliff Bentz	R	Oregon 2	January 3, 2021		
302	Stephanie Bice	R	Oklahoma 5	January 3, 2021		
303	Lauren Boebert	R	Colorado 3	January 3, 2021		
304	Jamaal Bowman	D	New York 16	January 3, 2021		
305	Cori Bush	D	Missouri 1	January 3, 2021		
306	Kat Cammack	R	Florida 3	January 3, 2021		
307	Jerry Carl	R	Alabama 1	January 3, 2021		
308	Andrew Clyde	R	Georgia 9	January 3, 2021		
309	Byron Donalds	R	Florida 19	January 3, 2021		
310	Pat Fallon	R	Texas 4	January 3, 2021		
311	Randy Feenstra	R	Iowa 4	January 3, 2021		
312	Michelle Fischbach	R	Minnesota 7	January 3, 2021		
313	Scott L. Fitzgerald	R	Wisconsin 5	January 3, 2021		
314	Scott Franklin	R	Florida 18	January 3, 2021		
315	Andrew Garbarino	R	New York 2	January 3, 2021		
316	Carlos A. Giménez	R	Florida 28	January 3, 2021		
317	Tony Gonzales	R	Texas 23	January 3, 2021		
318	Bob Good	R	Virginia 5	January 3, 2021		
319	Marjorie Taylor Greene	R	Georgia 14	January 3, 2021		
320	Diana Harshbarger	R	Tennessee 1	January 3, 2021		
321	Ashley Hinson	R	Iowa 2	January 3, 2021		
322	Ronny Jackson	R	Texas 13	January 3, 2021		
323	Sara Jacobs	D	California 51	January 3, 2021		
324	Young Kim	R	California 40	January 3, 2021		
325	Jake LaTurner	R	Kansas 2	January 3, 2021		
326	Teresa Leger Fernandez	D	New Mexico 3	January 3, 2021		
327	Nancy Mace	R	South Carolina 1	January 3, 2021		
328	Nicole Malliotakis	R	New York 11	January 3, 2021		
329	Tracey Mann	R	Kansas 1	January 3, 2021		
330	Kathy Manning	D	North Carolina 6	January 3, 2021		
331	Lisa McClain	R	Michigan 9	January 3, 2021		
332	Mary Miller	R	Illinois 15	January 3, 2021		
333	Mariannette Miller-Meeks	R	Iowa 1	January 3, 2021		
334	Barry Moore	R	Alabama 2	January 3, 2021		
335	Blake Moore	R	Utah 1	January 3, 2021		
336	Frank J. Mrvan	D	Indiana 1	January 3, 2021		
337	Troy Nehls	R	Texas 22	January 3, 2021		
338	Jay Obernolte	R	California 23	January 3, 2021		
339	Burgess Owens	R	Utah 4	January 3, 2021		
340	August Pfluger	R	Texas 11	January 3, 2021		
341	Matt Rosendale	R	Montana 2	January 3, 2021		
342	Deborah K. Ross	D	North Carolina 2	January 3, 2021		
343	María Elvira Salazar	R	Florida 27	January 3, 2021		
344	Victoria Spartz	R	Indiana 5	January 3, 2021		
345	Michelle Steel	R	California 45	January 3, 2021		
346	Marilyn Strickland	D	Washington 10	January 3, 2021		
347	Ritchie Torres	D	New York 15	January 3, 2021		
348	Beth Van Duyne	R	Texas 24	January 3, 2021		
349	Nikema Williams	D	Georgia 5	January 3, 2021		
350	Julia Letlow	R	Louisiana 5	March 20, 2021		
351	Troy Carter	D	Louisiana 2	April 24, 2021		
352	Melanie Stansbury	D	New Mexico 1	June 1, 2021		
353	Jake Ellzey	R	Texas 6	July 27, 2021		
354	Shontel Brown	D	Ohio 11	November 2, 2021		
355	Mike Carey	R	Ohio 15	November 2, 2021		
356	Sheila Cherfilus-McCormick	D	Florida 20	January 11, 2022		
357	Mike Flood	R	Nebraska 1	June 28, 2022		
358	Brad Finstad	R	Minnesota 1	August 9, 2022		
359	Mary Peltola	D	Alaska at-large	August 16, 2022		
360	Pat Ryan	D	New York 18	August 23, 2022		
361	Rudy Yakym	R	Indiana 2	November 8, 2022		
362	Ryan Zinke	R	Montana 1	January 3, 2023	2015–2017	
363	Mark Alford	R	Missouri 4	January 3, 2023		
364	Becca Balint	D	Vermont at-large	January 3, 2023		
365	Aaron Bean	R	Florida 4	January 3, 2023		
366	Josh Brecheen	R	Oklahoma 2	January 3, 2023		
367	Nikki Budzinski	D	Illinois 13	January 3, 2023		
368	Eric Burlison	R	Missouri 7	January 3, 2023		
369	Yadira Caraveo	D	Colorado 8	January 3, 2023		
370	Greg Casar	D	Texas 35	January 3, 2023		
371	Lori Chavez-DeRemer	R	Oregon 5	January 3, 2023		
372	Juan Ciscomani	R	Arizona 6	January 3, 2023		
373	Mike Collins	R	Georgia 10	January 3, 2023		
374	Eli Crane	R	Arizona 2	January 3, 2023		
375	Jasmine Crockett	D	Texas 30	January 3, 2023		
376	Anthony D'Esposito	R	New York 4	January 3, 2023		
377	Don Davis	D	North Carolina 1	January 3, 2023		
378	Monica De La Cruz	R	Texas 15	January 3, 2023		
379	Chris Deluzio	D	Pennsylvania 17	January 3, 2023		
380	John Duarte	R	California 13	January 3, 2023		
381	Chuck Edwards	R	North Carolina 11	January 3, 2023		
382	Mike Ezell	R	Mississippi 4	January 3, 2023		
383	Valerie Foushee	D	North Carolina 4	January 3, 2023		
384	Maxwell Frost	D	Florida 10	January 3, 2023		
385	Russell Fry	R	South Carolina 7	January 3, 2023		
386	Robert Garcia	D	California 42	January 3, 2023		
387	Marie Gluesenkamp Pérez	D	Washington 3	January 3, 2023		
388	Dan Goldman	D	New York 10	January 3, 2023		
389	Harriet Hageman	R	Wyoming at-large	January 3, 2023		
390	Erin Houchin	R	Indiana 9	January 3, 2023		
391	Val Hoyle	D	Oregon 4	January 3, 2023		
392	Wesley Hunt	R	Texas 38	January 3, 2023		
393	Glenn Ivey	D	Maryland 4	January 3, 2023		
394	Jeff Jackson	D	North Carolina 14	January 3, 2023		
395	Jonathan Jackson	D	Illinois 1	January 3, 2023		
396	John James	R	Michigan 10	January 3, 2023		
397	Sydney Kamlager	D	California 37	January 3, 2023		
398	Thomas Kean Jr.	R	New Jersey 7	January 3, 2023		
399	Jen Kiggans	R	Virginia 2	January 3, 2023		
400	Kevin Kiley	R	California 3	January 3, 2023		
401	Nick LaLota	R	New York 1	January 3, 2023		
402	Greg Landsman	D	Ohio 1	January 3, 2023		
403	Nick Langworthy	R	New York 23	January 3, 2023		
404	Mike Lawler	R	New York 17	January 3, 2023		
405	Laurel Lee	R	Florida 15	January 3, 2023		
406	Summer Lee	D	Pennsylvania 12	January 3, 2023		
407	Anna Paulina Luna	R	Florida 13	January 3, 2023		
408	Morgan Luttrell	R	Texas 8	January 3, 2023		
409	Seth Magaziner	D	Rhode Island 2	January 3, 2023		
410	Rich McCormick	R	Georgia 6	January 3, 2023		
411	Morgan McGarvey	D	Kentucky 3	January 3, 2023		
412	Rob Menendez	D	New Jersey 8	January 3, 2023		
413	Max Miller	R	Ohio 7	January 3, 2023		
414	Cory Mills	R	Florida 7	January 3, 2023		
415	Marc Molinaro	R	New York 19	January 3, 2023		
416	Nathaniel Moran	R	Texas 1	January 3, 2023		
417	Jared Moskowitz	D	Florida 23	January 3, 2023		
418	Kevin Mullin	D	California 15	January 3, 2023		
419	Wiley Nickel	D	North Carolina 13	January 3, 2023		
420	Zach Nunn	R	Iowa 3	January 3, 2023		
421	Andy Ogles	R	Tennessee 5	January 3, 2023		
422	Brittany Pettersen	D	Colorado 7	January 3, 2023		
423	Delia Ramirez	D	Illinois 3	January 3, 2023		
424	Andrea Salinas	D	Oregon 6	January 3, 2023		
425	George Santos	R	New York 3	January 3, 2023		Expelled on December 1, 2023
426	Hillary Scholten	D	Michigan 3	January 3, 2023		
427	Keith Self	R	Texas 3	January 3, 2023		
428	Eric Sorensen	D	Illinois 17	January 3, 2023		
429	Dale Strong	R	Alabama 5	January 3, 2023		
430	Emilia Sykes	D	Ohio 13	January 3, 2023		
431	Shri Thanedar	D	Michigan 13	January 3, 2023		
432	Jill Tokuda	D	Hawaii 2	January 3, 2023		
433	Derrick Van Orden	R	Wisconsin 3	January 3, 2023		
434	Gabe Vasquez	D	New Mexico 2	January 3, 2023		
435	Brandon Williams	R	New York 22	January 3, 2023		
	Jennifer McClellan	D	Virginia 4	February 21, 2023		
	Gabe Amo	D	Rhode Island 1	November 7, 2023		
	Celeste Maloy	R	Utah 2	November 21, 2023		
	Tim Kennedy	D	New York 26	April 30, 2024		
	Vince Fong	R	California 20	May 21, 2024		
	Michael Rulli	R	Ohio 6	June 11, 2024		
	Greg Lopez	R	Colorado 4	June 25, 2024		
	LaMonica McIver	D	New Jersey 10	September 18, 2024		
	Erica Lee Carter	D	Texas 18	November 5, 2024		
	Tony Wied	R	Wisconsin 8	November 5, 2024		
Rank	Member	Party	District	Seniority date	Previous service	Committee and leadership positions

== See also ==
- List of current United States representatives
- List of United States congressional districts
- List of United States senators in the 118th Congress
- Seniority in the United States House of Representatives
