= List of United States senators in the 118th Congress =

This is a complete list of United States senators during the 118th United States Congress listed by seniority from January 3, 2023, to January 3, 2025. It is a historical listing and will contain people who have not served the entire two-year Congress should anyone resign, die, or be expelled.

Order of service is based on the commencement of the senator's first term. Behind this is former service as a senator (only giving the senator seniority within their new incoming class), service as vice president, a House member, a cabinet secretary, or a governor of a state. The final factor is the population of the senator's state. If two senators are tied on all factors, as in the case of Jon Ossoff and Raphael Warnock, the senator elected to the full term is the senior senator.

In this Congress, the most junior senior senator was Jon Ossoff, and Maria Cantwell was the most senior junior senator.

Mike Braun was the most junior senator to serve as chair or ranking member of a committee. The most senior senator to not serve as chair or ranking member of a committee was Dianne Feinstein until her death, after which it was John Cornyn.

== Terms of service ==
Class	Terms of service of senators that will expire in years
Class 1	Terms of service of senators that expired in 2025 (Arizona, California, Connecticut, Delaware, Florida, Hawaii, Indiana, Maine, Maryland, Massachusetts, Michigan, Minnesota, Mississippi, Missouri, Montana, Nebraska, Nevada, New Jersey, New Mexico, New York, North Dakota, Ohio, Pennsylvania, Rhode Island, Tennessee, Texas, Utah, Vermont, Virginia, Washington, West Virginia, Wisconsin, and Wyoming.)
Class 2	Terms of service of senators that will expire in 2027 (Alabama, Alaska, Arkansas, Colorado, Delaware, Georgia, Iowa, Idaho, Illinois, Kansas, Kentucky, Louisiana, Massachusetts, Maine, Michigan, Minnesota, Mississippi, Montana, North Carolina, Nebraska, New Hampshire, New Jersey, New Mexico, Oklahoma, Oregon, Rhode Island, South Carolina, South Dakota, Tennessee, Texas, Virginia, West Virginia, and Wyoming.)
Class 3	Terms of service of senators that will expire in 2029 (Alabama, Alaska, Arizona, Arkansas, California, Colorado, Connecticut, Delaware, Florida, Georgia, Hawaii, Idaho, Illinois, Iowa, Indiana, Kansas, Kentucky, Louisiana, Massachusetts, Maine, Michigan, Minnesota, Mississippi, North Carolina, North Dakota, New Hampshire, New Mexico, Nevada, New York, Oklahoma, Oregon, South Carolina, South Dakota, Tennessee, Utah, Washington and Wisconsin.)

== U.S. Senate seniority list ==
Rank	Historical rank	Senator	Party	State	Seniority date	Other factors	Leadership
1	1743	Chuck Grassley	Republican	Iowa	January 3, 1981		Ranking Member: Budget President Pro Tempore emeritus
2	1766	Mitch McConnell	Republican	Kentucky	January 3, 1985		Minority Leader
3	1801	Dianne Feinstein (Note: In California, Dianne Feinstein (D) was set to retire at the end of this Congress, but died September 28, 2023. She was replaced by Laphonza Butler (D), who was appointed by Governor Gavin Newsom.)	Democratic	California	November 4, 1992		
4	1812	Patty Murray	Democratic	Washington	January 3, 1993		Chair: Appropriations President Pro Tempore
5	1827	Ron Wyden	Democratic	Oregon	February 5, 1996		Chair: Finance
6	1831	Dick Durbin	Democratic	Illinois	January 3, 1997	Former member of the U.S. House of Representatives (14 years)	Majority Whip Chair: Judiciary
7	1835	Jack Reed	Democratic	Rhode Island	January 3, 1997	Former member of the U.S. House of Representatives (6 years)	Chair: Armed Services
8	1842	Susan Collins	Republican	Maine	January 3, 1997		Ranking Member: Appropriations
9	1844	Chuck Schumer	Democratic	New York	January 3, 1999	Former member of the U.S. House of Representatives (18 years)	Majority Leader
10	1846	Mike Crapo	Republican	Idaho	January 3, 1999	Former member of the U.S. House of Representatives (6 years)	Ranking Member: Finance
11	1855	Tom Carper	Democratic	Delaware	January 3, 2001	Former member of the U.S. House of Representatives (10 years)	Chair: Environment and Public Works
12	1856	Debbie Stabenow	Democratic	Michigan	January 3, 2001	Former member of the U.S. House of Representatives (4 years)	Chair: Agriculture, Nutrition, and Forestry
13	1859	Maria Cantwell	Democratic	Washington	January 3, 2001	Former member of the U.S. House of Representatives (2 years)	Chair: Commerce, Science, and Transportation
14	1867	John Cornyn	Republican	Texas	December 1, 2002		
15	1868	Lisa Murkowski	Republican	Alaska	December 20, 2002		Ranking Member: Indian Affairs
16	1870	Lindsey Graham	Republican	South Carolina	January 3, 2003		Ranking Member: Judiciary
17	1879	John Thune	Republican	South Dakota	January 3, 2005		Minority Whip
18	1885	Bob Menendez (Note: In New Jersey, Bob Menendez (D) resigned August 20, 2024, after being convicted on federal bribery and corruption charges. He was replaced by George Helmy (D), who was appointed by Governor Phil Murphy.)	Democratic	New Jersey	January 18, 2006		Chair: Foreign Relations (until September 2023)
19	1886	Ben Cardin	Democratic	Maryland	January 3, 2007	Former member of the U.S. House of Representatives (20 years)	Chair: Foreign Relations (until September 2023) Chair: Small Business and Entrepreneurship (from September 2023)
20	1887	Bernie Sanders	Independent	Vermont	January 3, 2007	Former member of the U.S. House of Representatives (16 years)	Chair: Health, Education, Labor, and Pensions
21	1888	Sherrod Brown	Democratic	Ohio	January 3, 2007	Former member of the U.S. House of Representatives (14 years)	Chair: Banking, Housing, and Urban Affairs
22	1889	Bob Casey Jr.	Democratic	Pennsylvania	January 3, 2007	Pennsylvania 6th in population (2000)	Chair: Aging
23	1893	Amy Klobuchar	Democratic	Minnesota	January 3, 2007	Minnesota 21st in population (2000)	Chair: Rules and Administration
24	1894	Sheldon Whitehouse	Democratic	Rhode Island	January 3, 2007	Rhode Island 43rd in population (2000)	Chair: Budget
25	1895	Jon Tester	Democratic	Montana	January 3, 2007	Montana 44th in population (2000)	Chair: Veterans Affairs
26	1896	John Barrasso	Republican	Wyoming	June 25, 2007		Ranking Member: Energy and Natural Resources
27	1897	Roger Wicker	Republican	Mississippi	December 31, 2007		Ranking Member: Armed Services
28	1901	Jeanne Shaheen	Democratic	New Hampshire	January 3, 2009	Former governor (6 years)	Chair: Small Business and Entrepreneurship (from September 2023)
29	1902	Mark Warner	Democratic	Virginia	January 3, 2009	Former governor (4 years)	Chair: Intelligence
30	1903	Jim Risch	Republican	Idaho	January 3, 2009	Former governor (7 months)	Ranking Member: Foreign Relations
31	1905	Jeff Merkley	Democratic	Oregon	January 3, 2009		
32	1909	Michael Bennet	Democratic	Colorado	January 21, 2009		
33	1910	Kirsten Gillibrand	Democratic	New York	January 26, 2009		
34	1916	Joe Manchin	Democratic, Independent (Note: Despite Joe Manchin's 2024 party change, he retains his seniority since there is no break in his Senate service.)	West Virginia	November 15, 2010	Former governor	Chair: Energy and Natural Resources
35	1917	Chris Coons	Democratic	Delaware	November 15, 2010		Chair: Ethics
36	1920	Jerry Moran	Republican	Kansas	January 3, 2011	Former member of the U.S. House of Representatives (14 years)	Ranking Member: Veterans Affairs
37	1922	John Boozman	Republican	Arkansas	January 3, 2011	Former member of the U.S. House of Representatives (9 years)	Ranking Member: Agriculture, Nutrition, and Forestry
38	1924	John Hoeven	Republican	North Dakota	January 3, 2011	Former governor	
39	1925	Marco Rubio	Republican	Florida	January 3, 2011	Florida 4th in population (2000)	Ranking Member: Intelligence
40	1926	Ron Johnson	Republican	Wisconsin	January 3, 2011	Wisconsin 18th in population (2000)	
41	1927	Rand Paul	Republican	Kentucky	January 3, 2011	Kentucky 25th in population (2000)	Ranking Member: Homeland Security and Governmental Affairs
42	1928	Richard Blumenthal	Democratic	Connecticut	January 3, 2011	Connecticut 29th in population (2000)	
43	1929	Mike Lee	Republican	Utah	January 3, 2011	Utah 34th in population (2000)	
44	1932	Brian Schatz	Democratic	Hawaii	December 27, 2012		Chair: Indian Affairs
45	1933	Tim Scott	Republican	South Carolina	January 2, 2013		Ranking Member: Banking, Housing, and Urban Affairs
46	1934	Tammy Baldwin	Democratic	Wisconsin	January 3, 2013	Former member of the U.S. House of Representatives (14 years)	
47	1937	Chris Murphy	Democratic	Connecticut	January 3, 2013	Former member of the U.S. House of Representatives (6 years); Connecticut 29th in population (2010)	
48	1938	Mazie Hirono	Democratic	Hawaii	January 3, 2013	Former member of the U.S. House of Representatives (6 years); Hawaii 42nd in population (2010)	
49	1939	Martin Heinrich	Democratic	New Mexico	January 3, 2013	Former member of the U.S. House of Representatives (4 years)	
50	1940	Angus King	Independent	Maine	January 3, 2013	Former governor (8 years)	
51	1941	Tim Kaine	Democratic	Virginia	January 3, 2013	Former governor (4 years)	
52	1942	Ted Cruz	Republican	Texas	January 3, 2013	Texas 2nd in population (2010)	Ranking Member: Commerce, Science, and Transportation
53	1943	Elizabeth Warren	Democratic	Massachusetts	January 3, 2013	Massachusetts 15th in population (2010)	
54	1944	Deb Fischer	Republican	Nebraska	January 3, 2013	Nebraska 38th in population (2010)	Ranking Member: Rules and Administration
55	1948	Ed Markey	Democratic	Massachusetts	July 16, 2013	Former member of the U.S. House of Representatives (36 years)	
56	1949	Cory Booker	Democratic	New Jersey	October 31, 2013		
57	1951	Shelley Moore Capito	Republican	West Virginia	January 3, 2015	Former member of the U.S. House of Representatives (14 years)	Ranking Member: Environment and Public Works
58	1952	Gary Peters	Democratic	Michigan	January 3, 2015	Former member of the U.S. House of Representatives (6 years); Michigan 9th in population (2010)	Chair: Homeland Security and Governmental Affairs
59	1953	Bill Cassidy	Republican	Louisiana	January 3, 2015	Former member of the U.S. House of Representatives (6 years); Louisiana 25th in population (2010)	Ranking Member: Health, Education, Labor, and Pensions
60	1955	James Lankford	Republican	Oklahoma	January 3, 2015	Former member of the U.S. House of Representatives (4 years)	Ranking Member: Ethics
61	1956	Tom Cotton	Republican	Arkansas	January 3, 2015	Former member of the U.S. House of Representatives (2 years); Arkansas 32nd in population (2010)	
62	1957	Steve Daines	Republican	Montana	January 3, 2015	Former member of the U.S. House of Representatives (2 years); Montana 44th in population (2010)	
63	1958	Mike Rounds	Republican	South Dakota	January 3, 2015	Former governor	
64	1960	Thom Tillis	Republican	North Carolina	January 3, 2015	North Carolina 10th in population (2010)	
65	1961	Joni Ernst	Republican	Iowa	January 3, 2015	Iowa 30th in population (2010)	Ranking Member: Small Business and Entrepreneurship
66	1962	Ben Sasse (Note: In Nebraska, Ben Sasse (R) resigned January 8, 2023. He was replaced by Pete Ricketts (R), who was appointed by Governor Jim Pillen.)	Republican	Nebraska	January 3, 2015	Nebraska 38th in population (2010)	
67	1963	Dan Sullivan	Republican	Alaska	January 3, 2015	Alaska 47th in population (2010)	
68	1964	Chris Van Hollen	Democratic	Maryland	January 3, 2017	Former member of the U.S. House of Representatives (14 years)	
69	1965	Todd Young	Republican	Indiana	January 3, 2017	Former member of the U.S. House of Representatives (6 years)	
70	1966	Tammy Duckworth	Democratic	Illinois	January 3, 2017	Former member of the U.S. House of Representatives (4 years)	
71	1967	Maggie Hassan	Democratic	New Hampshire	January 3, 2017	Former governor	
72	1969	John Kennedy	Republican	Louisiana	January 3, 2017	Louisiana 25th in population (2010)	
73	1970	Catherine Cortez Masto	Democratic	Nevada	January 3, 2017	Nevada 35th in population (2010)	
74	1972	Tina Smith	Democratic	Minnesota	January 3, 2018		
75	1974	Cindy Hyde-Smith	Republican	Mississippi	April 2, 2018		
76	1975	Marsha Blackburn	Republican	Tennessee	January 3, 2019	Former member of the U.S. House of Representatives (16 years)	
77	1976	Kyrsten Sinema	Independent (Note: Despite Kyrsten Sinema's 2022 party change, she retains her seniority since there is no break in her Senate service.)	Arizona	January 3, 2019	Former member of the U.S. House of Representatives (6 years); Arizona 16th in population (2010)	
78	1977	Kevin Cramer	Republican	North Dakota	January 3, 2019	Former member of the U.S. House of Representatives (6 years); North Dakota 48th in population (2010)	
79	1979	Jacky Rosen	Democratic	Nevada	January 3, 2019	Former member of the U.S. House of Representatives (2 years)	
80	1980	Mitt Romney	Republican	Utah	January 3, 2019	Former governor	
81	1981	Mike Braun	Republican	Indiana	January 3, 2019	Indiana 15th in population (2010)	Ranking Member: Aging
82	1982	Josh Hawley	Republican	Missouri	January 3, 2019	Missouri 18th in population (2010)	
83	1983	Rick Scott	Republican	Florida	January 8, 2019		
84	1985	Mark Kelly	Democratic	Arizona	December 2, 2020		
85	1986	Ben Ray Luján	Democratic	New Mexico	January 3, 2021	Former member of the U.S. House of Representatives (12 years)	
86	1987	Cynthia Lummis	Republican	Wyoming	January 3, 2021	Former member of the U.S. House of Representatives (8 years)	
87	1988	Roger Marshall	Republican	Kansas	January 3, 2021	Former member of the U.S. House of Representatives (4 years)	
88	1989	John Hickenlooper	Democratic	Colorado	January 3, 2021	Former governor	
89	1990	Bill Hagerty	Republican	Tennessee	January 3, 2021	Tennessee 17th in population (2010)	
90	1991	Tommy Tuberville	Republican	Alabama	January 3, 2021	Alabama 23rd in population (2010)	
91	1992	Alex Padilla	Democratic	California	January 18, 2021		
92	1993	Jon Ossoff	Democratic	Georgia	January 20, 2021	"O" 15th in alphabet	
93	1994	Raphael Warnock	Democratic	Georgia	January 20, 2021	"W" 23rd in alphabet	
94	1995	Peter Welch	Democratic	Vermont	January 3, 2023	Former member of the U.S. House of Representatives (16 years)	
95	1996	Markwayne Mullin	Republican	Oklahoma	January 3, 2023	Former member of the U.S. House of Representatives (10 years)	
96	1997	Ted Budd	Republican	North Carolina	January 3, 2023	Former member of the U.S. House of Representatives (6 years)	
97	1998	John Fetterman	Democratic	Pennsylvania	January 3, 2023	Pennsylvania 5th in population (2020)	
98	1999	JD Vance	Republican	Ohio	January 3, 2023	Ohio 7th in population (2020)	
99	2000	Eric Schmitt	Republican	Missouri	January 3, 2023	Missouri 19th in population (2020)	
100	2001	Katie Britt	Republican	Alabama	January 3, 2023	Alabama 24th in population (2020)	
	2002	Pete Ricketts	Republican	Nebraska	January 23, 2023		
	2003	Laphonza Butler	Democratic	California	October 1, 2023		
	2004	George Helmy	Democratic	New Jersey	August 20, 2024		
	2005	Adam Schiff	Democratic	California	December 8, 2024	Former member of the U.S. House of Representatives (24 years)	
	2006	Andy Kim	Democratic	New Jersey	December 8, 2024	Former member of the U.S. House of Representatives (6 years)	

The most senior senators by class were Dianne Feinstein (D-California) from Class 1, Mitch McConnell (R-Kentucky) from Class 2, and Chuck Grassley (R-Iowa) from Class 3. When Feinstein died on September 29, 2023 Tom Carper (D-Delaware) became the most senior senator from his class.

== See also ==
- 118th United States Congress
- List of United States representatives in the 118th Congress
- Seniority in the United States Senate
