= Katherine Brunett McGuire =

American political aide and government official

Assistant Secretary of Labor for Congressional and Intergovernmental Affairs
- In office January 2, 2018 – January 15, 2019
- President: Donald Trump

Personal details
- Born: Missoula, Montana
- Spouse: David P. McGuire
- Children: 2

Katherine Brunett McGuire is an American political aide and government official who served as the Assistant Secretary of Labor for Congressional and Intergovernmental Affairs.

== Career ==
In September 2017 McGuire was nominated as Assistant Secretary for Congressional and Intergovernmental Affairs at the Labor Department. Her nomination passed the Senate by voice on December 21, 2017. She resigned from her position on January 15, 2019.

Prior to her confirmation, she was the chief of staff to U.S. Representative Randy Hultgren. McGuire previously served as staff director of the United States Senate Committee on Health, Education, Labor and Pensions under Mike Enzi. She also served as Enzi's legislative director and as staff director of the United States Senate Committee on Banking, Housing, and Urban Affairs. She has held posts with Alan K. Simpson and Richard Lugar. McGuire's private sector experience includes leading BSA (The Software Alliance)'s global public policy and government relations division as vice president.

In January 2019, the American Psychological Association announced McGuire's appointment as its first Chief Advocacy Officer.

== Education ==
McGuire holds a bachelor's degree in agricultural economics and international development and master's degree in economics from the University of Wyoming. She also received a certificate in executive leadership from the John F. Kennedy School of Government at Harvard University.
