= U.S. Department of Labor, Office of Inspector General =

US government position

U.S. Department of Labor Office of Inspector General

Agency overview
- Formed: 1978
- Jurisdiction: U.S. Department of Labor and external labor racketeering and trafficking function
- Agency executive: Anthony D'Esposito, Inspector General
- Parent department: U.S. Department of Labor
- Website: oig.dol.gov

The U.S. Department of Labor, Office of Inspector General (DOL OIG) is one of the inspector general offices created by the Inspector General Act of 1978.

The inspector general for the Department of Labor is charged with investigating and auditing department programs to combat waste, fraud, and abuse.

The Office of Inspector General (OIG) at the U.S. Department of Labor (DOL) conducts audits to review the effectiveness, efficiency, economy, and integrity of all DOL programs and operations, including those performed by its contractors and grantees. This work is conducted in order to determine whether: the programs and operations are in compliance with the applicable laws and regulations; DOL resources are efficiently and economically being utilized; and DOL programs achieve their intended results. The OIG also conducts criminal, civil, and administrative investigations into alleged violations of federal laws relating to DOL programs, operations, and personnel. In addition, the OIG conducts criminal investigations to combat the influence of labor racketeering and organized crime in the nation's labor unions in three areas: employee benefit plans, labor-management relations, and internal union affairs. The OIG also works with other law enforcement partners on human trafficking matters.

== History of Inspectors General ==
Inspector General	Appointment Date
Anthony D'Esposito	January 5, 2026
Luiz A. Santos (Acting)	January 24, 2025
Larry D. Turner	December 7, 2021
Larry D. Turner (Acting)	June 22, 2020
Scott S. Dahl	October 16, 2013
Daniel R. Petrole (Acting)	July 15, 2009
Gordon S. Heddell	January 2, 2001
Patricia Dalton (Acting)	January 3, 2000
Charles C. Masten	November 20, 1993
Charles C. Masten (Acting)	March 20, 1993
Julian W. De La Rosa	August 6, 1990
Raymond Maria (Acting)	September 3, 1989
J. Brian Hyland	August 4, 1983
J. Brian Hyland (Acting)	March 23, 1983
Robert McGee (Acting)	October 16, 1982
Thomas McBride	July 18, 1981
Frank Y. Yeager (Acting)	February 1, 1981
Ronald Goldstock (Acting)	May 2, 1980
Marjorie Fine Knowles	May 18, 1979
Rocco De Marco (Acting)	October 23, 1978
