= Larry D. Turner =

American government official

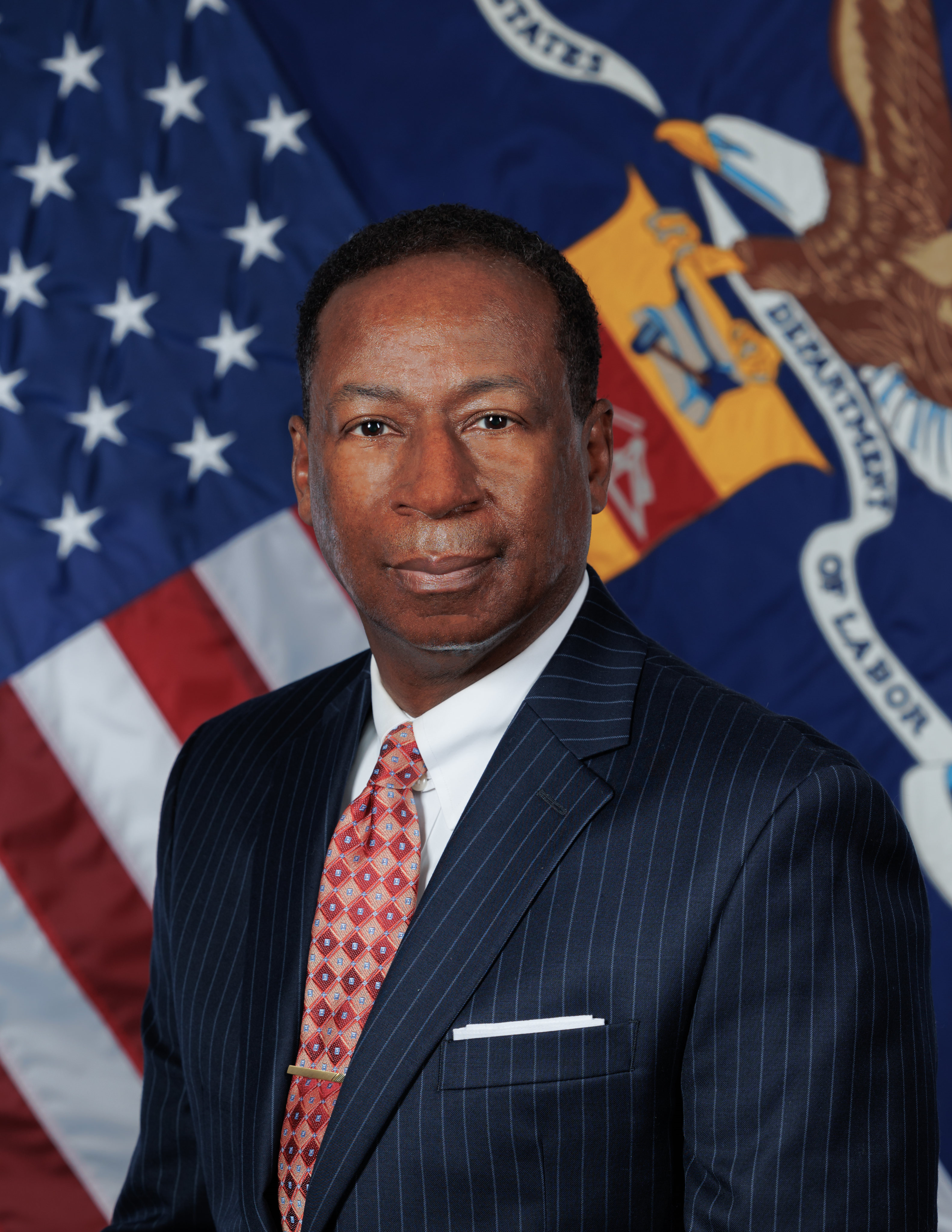

Inspector General of the United States Department of Labor
- In office December 7, 2021 – January 24, 2025; Acting: June 22, 2020 – December 7, 2021
- President: Donald Trump; Joe Biden; Donald Trump
- Preceded by: Scott Dahl
- Succeeded by: Anthony D'Esposito

Personal details
- Born: October 6, 1956 (age 69)
- Education: Morgan State University (BS); Dwight D. Eisenhower School for National Security and Resource Strategy (MS); Golden Gate University (MBA)

Military service
- Allegiance: United States
- Branch/service: United States Army
- Years of service: 1978 - 2002
- Rank: Lieutenant Colonel

Larry D. Turner (born October 6, 1956) is a retired United States Army Lieutenant Colonel and American government official who served as the Inspector General of the United States Department of Labor from 2021 to 2025.

On January 24, 2025, he was fired by President Donald Trump along with several other inspectors general.

== Early life and education ==
Turner is the son of Nancy Waterman and Lambert Turner. He graduated from Hampton High School in Hampton, VA. Turner holds a Bachelor of Sciences in Business from Morgan State University, a Master of Business Administration from Golden Gate University, and a Master of Sciences in Resource Management from the Dwight D. Eisenhower School for National Security and Resource Strategy formerly known as the Industrial College of the Armed Forces (ICAF). He is also a graduate of the Command and General Staff College; the Harvard University Senior Executive Fellow Program; the Defense Leadership and Management Program (DLAMP); and the Federal Executive Institute. Turner also holds a certificate in Financial Planning from Georgetown University.

== Career ==
Turner began his career in the U.S. Army and later served as Army Installation Management Command Liaison Officer to the Army Materiel Command, and Executive Officer to the executive director. He served 24 years in the U.S. Army and retired as a Lieutenant Colonel. Prior to joining the DOL-OIG, Turner served as Deputy and Acting Assistant Inspector General for the Office of Communication and Congressional Liaison, Department of Defense, and the Deputy Inspector General for the Army Installation Management Command. Turner served as DOL's Acting Inspector General from June 2020 to December 2021, and DOL's Deputy Inspector General from September 2014 to June 2020.

View full biography here.

=== Nomination as permanent IG ===
On May 28, 2021, President Joe Biden nominated Turner to serve permanently as Inspector General. The Senate Health, Education, Labor and Pensions Committee favorably reported his nomination on October 26, 2021; the Senate Homeland Security Committee also reported the nomination favorably on November 15, 2021. Turner's nomination was unanimously confirmed by the United States Senate on December 2, 2021.

As Inspector General, Turner oversees more than $75 billion in annual federal funding for essential programs, such as unemployment insurance, worker safety and health, training and reemployment services, pension and health care benefits, wage and hour standards, and economic statistics. He also directs criminal investigations into organized crime influence and labor racketeering corruption in employee benefit plans, internal union affairs, and labor-management relations. In addition, the OIG works with other law enforcement partners on human trafficking matters.

=== Pandemic Response Accountability Committee ===
Turner is highly engaged in the Inspector General Community and holds a statutory membership in both the Council of Inspector Generals for Integrity and Efficiency (CIGIE) and the CIGIE's Pandemic Response Accountability Committee (PRAC). The PRAC was established on March 10, 2020, with the responsibility of overseeing the allocation and utilization of $2.2 trillion in government funds dedicated to the COVID-19 pandemic response in the United States.

In addition to his involvement in the PRAC, Turner actively contributes to CIGIE's Employee Engagement and Innovation Committee work group.

== Awards and recognition ==
Turner has received numerous civilian and military awards to include: The 2024 Dept of Labor Office of Inspector General Distinguished Service Award, DoD and Army Civilian Meritorious Service Awards, Civilian Superior Service Award, Civilian Commander's Award, Legion of Merit, and Meritorious Service Medal with Five Oak Leaf Clusters, multiple Southwest Asia Medals, and the Army Parachutist Badge.
