= Anthony D'Esposito =

American politician (born 1982)

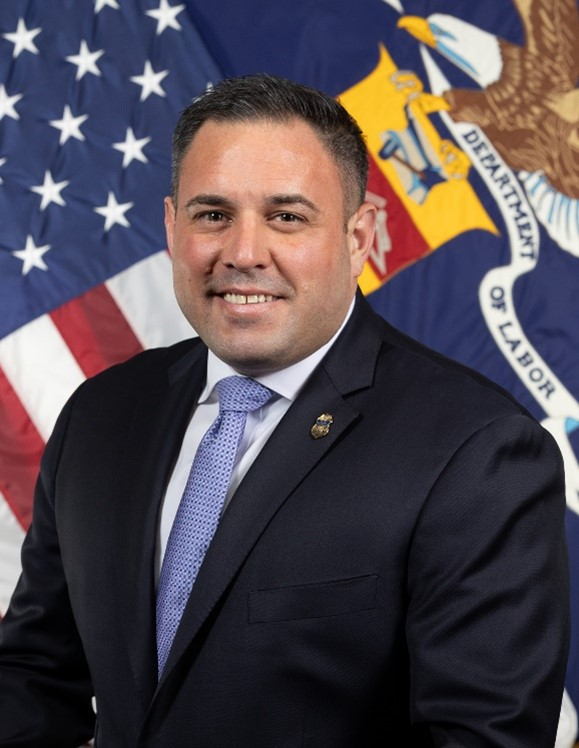
- Official portrait, 2026

Inspector General of the United States Department of Labor
- Incumbent
- Assumed office January 5, 2026
- President: Donald Trump
- Preceded by: Larry D. Turner

Member of the U.S. House of Representatives from New York's 4th district
- In office January 3, 2023 – January 3, 2025
- Preceded by: Kathleen Rice
- Succeeded by: Laura Gillen

Member of the Hempstead Town Council from the 4th district
- In office February 10, 2016 – January 3, 2023
- Preceded by: Anthony Santino
- Succeeded by: Laura Ryder

Personal details
- Born: February 22, 1982 (age 44)
- Party: Republican
- Education: Hofstra University (BA)
- Police career
- Department: New York City Police Department
- Service years: 2006–2020
- Rank: Detective

Anthony P. D'Esposito (/diˌɛspəˈzitoʊ/ dee-ESS-pə-ZEE-toh; born February 22, 1982) is an American politician and retired New York City Police Department (NYPD) detective who is currently serving as the Inspector General of the United States Department of Labor. A Republican, he represented New York's 4th congressional district in the United States House of Representatives from 2023 to 2025. His victory in the 2022 midterm election was considered a major upset, contributing to the narrow Republican majority in the House of Representatives.

In the 2024 election, he lost his re-election bid to Democrat Laura Gillen. On March 31, 2025, President Donald Trump nominated D'Esposito to be Inspector General for the United States Department of Labor.

== Police career ==
Before entering politics, D'Esposito was a police officer with NYPD's 73rd Precinct in Brownsville, Brooklyn, and a detective assigned to the 73rd Precinct Detective Squad and the Military and Extended Leave Desk. He joined the NYPD in 2006 and worked there until retiring in 2020.

D'Esposito received a misconduct complaint in 2007 for working second jobs as a bartender and disc jockey. The complaint stated that he was "known for flashing his gun around" and being "reckless"; internal affairs found that the allegation was partially substantiated, stripping him of 15 vacation days for "wrongfully" working as a DJ and serving alcoholic drinks "without authority or permission".

In 2011, Donald James filed a complaint, alleging that D'Esposito had taken a gold chain from him during an arrest and had not returned it. Internal affairs found that the complaint was partially substantiated, labeling it a "corruption case".

D'Esposito's gun was stolen after he left it in a car in 2015; he was found guilty of "failing to safeguard" his NYPD-issued firearm and was docked 20 vacation days.

In 2013, Gregory Crockett filed a lawsuit against D'Esposito and the city of New York, claiming that D'Esposito lied about Crockett living in a house containing illegal weapons. Crockett had spent 22 days in jail, after which all charges were dropped; the city subsequently settled the lawsuit in 2023, paying him $250,000 but admitting no wrongdoing.

== Hempstead Town Council ==
D'Esposito was appointed as a councilman on the Hempstead, New York, town council in 2016, and won a full term the following year. He served on the council until 2023, when he was elected to the U.S. House of Representatives.

== U.S. House of Representatives ==
=== Elections ===
==== 2022 ====
After winning the Republican 2022 primary election unopposed, D'Esposito faced former Hempstead town supervisor Laura Gillen in the general election. D'Esposito framed the race as a referendum on public safety and cost-of-living issues.

D'Esposito defeated Gillen with 51.8% of the vote. Some analysts attributed his victory to gubernatorial candidate Lee Zeldin's political coattails.

The New York Times reported that in a possible violation of House ethics rules, shortly after winning election D'Esposito had employed his longtime fiancée's daughter as special assistant. He also added a woman with whom he was having an affair to his office's payroll. Both employment contracts stopped shortly after his fiancée found out about D'Esposito's affair.

==== 2024 ====
D'Esposito ran for re-election in 2024. He was defeated by Democratic nominee Laura Gillen in a rematch of the 2022 election.

=== Tenure ===
In January 2023, D'Esposito became the first sitting Republican representative to call for Representative George Santos' resignation in the wake of revelations about Santos' false biographical statements. D'Esposito's office has reportedly aided with services for a number of Santos' neighboring 3rd district constituents, who could not reach, or refused to work with, Santos' office. On March 7, 2023, D'Esposito introduced the No Fortune for Fraud Act, legislation that would alter House rules to prohibit members from being paid for their celebrity status if they are indicted for finance or fraud crimes; Santos, who was under investigation for fraud and check forgery in Brazil, is not directly named in the legislation, but D'Esposito said he was "an inspiration" for it.

D'Esposito supported Kevin McCarthy in the 2023 Speaker of the House election.

On October 26, 2023, he introduced a resolution to expel George Santos from the House of Representatives.

D'Esposito was one of six Republicans to sign a bipartisan letter spearheaded by centrist House Representatives in which they pledged to respect the results of the 2024 presidential election.

=== Committee assignments ===
D'Esposito served on the following committees:

- Committee on Homeland Security
  - Subcommittee on Counterterrorism, Law Enforcement, and Intelligence
  - Subcommittee on Emergency Management and Technology (Chair)
- Committee on House Administration
  - Subcommittee on Elections
  - Subcommittee on Oversight
- Committee on Transportation and Infrastructure

=== Caucus memberships ===
- Climate Solutions Caucus
- Republican Governance Group
- Republican Main Street Partnership
- Congressional Hispanic Conference

== Trump administration ==
=== Inspector General of the United States Department of Labor ===
On March 31, 2025, President Donald Trump nominated D'Esposito to be Inspector General for the United States Department of Labor. D'Esopsito was one of 97 nominees to be confirmed en bloc by the Senate, 53-43, on December 18, 2025. D'Esposito was sworn in on January 6, 2026. His office opened an investigation after complaints alleged misconduct by Secretary of Labor Lori Chavez-DeRemer, her husband, and others.

== Personal life ==
D'Esposito is of Italian and Puerto Rican ancestry. He is Catholic.

== See also ==
- List of Hispanic and Latino Americans in the United States Congress

U.S. House of Representatives
Preceded by Kathleen Rice	Member of the U.S. House of Representatives from New York's 4th congressional district 2023–2025	Succeeded by Laura Gillen
U.S. order of precedence (ceremonial)
Preceded by Mondaire Jones as Former U.S. Representative	Order of precedence of the United States as Former U.S. Representative	Succeeded by Marc Molinaro as Former U.S. Representative
