= United States House Transportation Subcommittee on Coast Guard and Maritime Transportation =

Subcommittee of Committee on Transportation and Infrastructure
- Active United States House of Representatives; 119th Congress

Leadership
- Chair: Mike Ezell (R)
- Ranking Member: Salud Carbajal (D)

Structure
- Seats: 13 (13 currently filled) 7/7 6/6
- Political parties: Majority (7): Republican (7); Minority (6): Democratic (6)

Meeting place
- 2165, Rayburn House Office Building; Washington, D.C. 20515

Phone number
- (202)-225-9446

The Subcommittee on Coast Guard and Maritime Transportation is a subcommittee within the House Transportation and Infrastructure Committee.

== Jurisdiction ==
The Subcommittee has jurisdiction over maritime safety, security, law enforcement, and defense. Additionally, the Subcommittee exercises jurisdiction over merchant marine matters such as ocean shipping and cruise ships. The jurisdiction of this Subcommittee does not extend to matters directly related to national defense, which are handled by the House Armed Services Committee.

== Members, 119th Congress ==
Majority	Minority
Mike Ezell, Mississippi, Chair; Daniel Webster, Florida; Brian Mast, Florida; Jeff Van Drew, New Jersey; Nick Begich III, Alaska; Addison McDowell, North Carolina, Vice Chair; Vacancy	Salud Carbajal, California, Ranking Member; Chris Pappas, New Hampshire; Marilyn Strickland, Washington; Hillary Scholten, Michigan; Robert Garcia, California, Vice Ranking Member; John Garamendi, California
Ex officio
Sam Graves, Missouri	Rick Larsen, Washington

== Historical membership rosters ==
=== 115th Congress ===
Majority	Minority
Duncan D. Hunter, California, Chairman; Don Young, Alaska; Frank LoBiondo, New Jersey; Garret Graves, Louisiana; David Rouzer, North Carolina; Randy Weber, Texas; Brian Mast, Florida; Jason Lewis, Minnesota, Vice Chair	John Garamendi, California, Ranking Member; Elijah Cummings, Maryland; Rick Larsen, Washington; Jared Huffman, California; Alan Lowenthal, California; Eleanor Holmes Norton, District of Columbia
Ex officio
Bill Shuster, Pennsylvania	Pete DeFazio, Oregon

=== 116th Congress ===
Majority	Minority
Sean Patrick Maloney, New York, Chair; Elijah Cummings, Maryland; Rick Larsen, Washington; Stacey Plaskett, U.S. Virgin Islands; John Garamendi, California; Alan Lowenthal, California; Anthony Brown, Maryland; Chris Pappas, New Hampshire	Bob Gibbs, Ohio, Ranking Member; Don Young, Alaska; Randy Weber, Texas; Brian Mast, Florida; Mike Gallagher, Wisconsin; Carol Miller, West Virginia
Ex officio
Peter DeFazio, Oregon	Sam Graves, Missouri

=== 117th Congress ===
Majority	Minority
Salud Carbajal, California, Chair; Rick Larsen, Washington; Jake Auchincloss, Massachusetts, Vice Chair; Sean Patrick Maloney, New York; Alan Lowenthal, California; Anthony Brown, Maryland; Chris Pappas, New Hampshire	Bob Gibbs, Ohio, Ranking Member; Don Young, Alaska (until March 18, 2022); Randy Weber, Texas; Mike Gallagher, Wisconsin; Jeff Van Drew, New Jersey; Nicole Malliotakis, New York
Ex officio
Peter DeFazio, Oregon	Sam Graves, Missouri

=== 118th Congress ===
Majority	Minority
Daniel Webster, Florida, Chair; Brian Babin, Texas; Brian Mast, Florida; Jenniffer González Colón, Puerto Rico; Jeff Van Drew, New Jersey; Mike Ezell, Mississippi, Vice Chair; Aaron Bean, Florida	Salud Carbajal, California, Ranking Member; John Garamendi, California; Chris Pappas, New Hampshire; Jake Auchincloss, Massachusetts; Mary Peltola, Alaska; Hillary Scholten, Michigan
Ex officio
Sam Graves, Missouri	Rick Larsen, Washington
