= Reducing Regulatory Burdens Act of 2013 =

US proposal about pesticide laws

- Long title: To amend the Federal Insecticide, Fungicide, and Rodenticide Act and the Federal Water Pollution Control Act to clarify Congressional intent regarding the regulation of the use of pesticides in or near navigable waters, and for other purposes.
- Announced in: the 113th United States Congress
- Sponsored by: Rep. Bob Gibbs (R, OH-7)
- Number of co-sponsors: 3

Codification
- Acts affected: Federal Water Pollution Control Act, Federal Insecticide, Fungicide, and Rodenticide Act
- U.S.C. sections affected: 7 U.S.C. § 136a, 33 U.S.C. § 1342
- Agencies affected: United States Environmental Protection Agency

Legislative history
- Introduced in the House as H.R. 935 by Rep. Bob Gibbs (R, OH-7) on March 4, 2013; Committee consideration by United States House Committee on Transportation and Infrastructure, United States House Committee on Agriculture, United States House Transportation Subcommittee on Water Resources and Environment, United States House Agriculture Subcommittee on Horticulture, Research, Biotechnology, and Foreign Agriculture

The Reducing Regulatory Burdens Act of 2013 (H.R. 935) is a bill that would prohibit the Environmental Protection Agency (EPA) and states authorized to issue a permit under the National Pollutant Discharge Elimination System (NPDES) from requiring a permit for some discharges of pesticides authorized for use under the Federal Insecticide, Fungicide, and Rodenticide Act (FIFRA). The bill would clarify the law so that people did not have to get two permits in order to use the same pesticide.

The bill was introduced into the United States House of Representatives during the 113th United States Congress.

== Background ==
Similar legislation, H.R. 872, passed the House and the Senate Agriculture Committee during the 112th United States Congress, but never received a full vote in the Senate and did not become law.

== Provisions of the bill ==
This summary is based largely on the summary provided by the Congressional Research Service, a public domain source.

The Reducing Regulatory Burdens Act of 2013 would amend the Federal Insecticide, Fungicide, and Rodenticide Act (FIFRA) and the Federal Water Pollution Control Act (commonly known as the Clean Water Act (CWA)) to prohibit the Administrator of the Environmental Protection Agency (EPA) or a state from requiring a permit under the CWA for a discharge from a point source into navigable waters of a pesticide authorized for sale, distribution, or use under FIFRA, or the residue of such a pesticide, resulting from the application of such pesticide.

The bill would exempt from such prohibition the following discharges containing a pesticide or pesticide residue: (1) a discharge resulting from the application of a pesticide in violation of FIFRA that is relevant to protecting water quality, if the discharge would not have occurred but for the violation or the amount of pesticide or pesticide residue contained in the discharge is greater than would have occurred without the violation; (2) stormwater discharges regulated under the National Pollutant Discharge Elimination System (NPDES); and (3) discharges regulated under NPDES of manufacturing or industrial effluent or treatment works effluent and discharges incidental to the normal operation of a vessel, including a discharge resulting from ballasting operations or vessel biofouling prevention.

== Congressional Budget Office report ==
This summary is based largely on the summary provided by the Congressional Budget Office, as ordered reported by the House Committee on Agriculture on March 13, 2014. This is a public domain source.

H.R. 935 would prohibit the Environmental Protection Agency (EPA) and states authorized to issue a permit under the National Pollutant Discharge Elimination System (NPDES) from requiring a permit for some discharges of pesticides authorized for use under the Federal Insecticide, Fungicide, and Rodenticide Act (FIFRA). Under the bill, public and private entities would no longer need to obtain an NPDES permit for certain discharges of pesticides except in cases where the application of the pesticide would not fall under FIFRA, or in cases where the discharge is regulated as a stormwater, municipal, or industrial discharge under the Clean Water Act.

Based on information from EPA, the Congressional Budget Office (CBO) estimates that enacting this legislation would have no significant effect on the federal budget. Any administrative savings to EPA that might result from issuing fewer permits would be negligible because EPA has delegated the authority to issue most NPDES permits to states.

Pay-as-you-go procedures do not apply to H.R. 935 because enacting the bill would not affect direct spending or revenues.

H.R. 935 contains no intergovernmental or private-sector mandates as defined in the Unfunded Mandates Reform Act and would impose no costs on state, local, or tribal governments.

== Procedural history ==
The Reducing Regulatory Burdens Act of 2013 was introduced into the United States House of Representatives on March 4, 2013 by Rep. Bob Gibbs (R, OH-7). It was referred to the United States House Committee on Transportation and Infrastructure, the United States House Committee on Agriculture, the United States House Transportation Subcommittee on Water Resources and Environment, and the United States House Agriculture Subcommittee on Horticulture, Research, Biotechnology, and Foreign Agriculture. On June 2, 2014 the bill was ordered reported alongside House Report 113-467.

== Debate and discussion ==
Rep. Austin Scott (R-GA), who supported the bill, said that "federal agencies continue to develop and implement duplicative regulations that create undue burdens and more red tape for American citizens. H.R. 935 will provide clarity with EPA regulations, which will in turn allow citizens to better navigate the regulatory environment."

Rep. Mike McIntyre also supported the bill saying that the "bill is a great step toward reforming the regulatory process, streamlining government, and saving taxpayers' time and money."

Rep. Kurt Schrader (D-OR), a co-sponsor of the bill, explained his support by saying "under FIFRA pesticides must undergo extensive and rigorous testing before being approved. To require a duplicative permit for a pesticide that has already been approved through the FIFRA process is not only arbitrary, it's an unnecessary burden on regulators and applicators and does nothing to improve water quality."

The National Council of Farmer Cooperatives (NCFC) supported the bill. President Chuck Conner said that "the time for action on this issue is long overdue-farmers, growers and ranchers across the country are facing burdensome and redundant regulations and tremendous uncertainty for absolutely no environmental benefit."

Beyond impacting farmers, this bill could also affect other businesses such as those related to swimming pool chemicals.

The bill was opposed by Senators Barbara Boxer (D-CA) and Ben Cardin (D-MD) when an attempt was made to include its provisions in the 2014 farm bill.

== See also ==
- List of bills in the 113th United States Congress
