= Ohio State University (disambiguation) =

The Ohio State University is a public research university located in Columbus, Ohio.

The Ohio State University may also refer to the following regional campuses:

- The Ohio State University, Agricultural Technical Institute located in Wooster, Ohio
- The Ohio State University, Lima located in Lima, Ohio
- The Ohio State University, Mansfield located in Mansfield, Ohio
- The Ohio State University, Marion located in Marion, Ohio
- The Ohio State University, Newark located in Newark, Ohio

== See also ==
- Ohio University
