= Bob Gibbs =

American politician (born 1954)

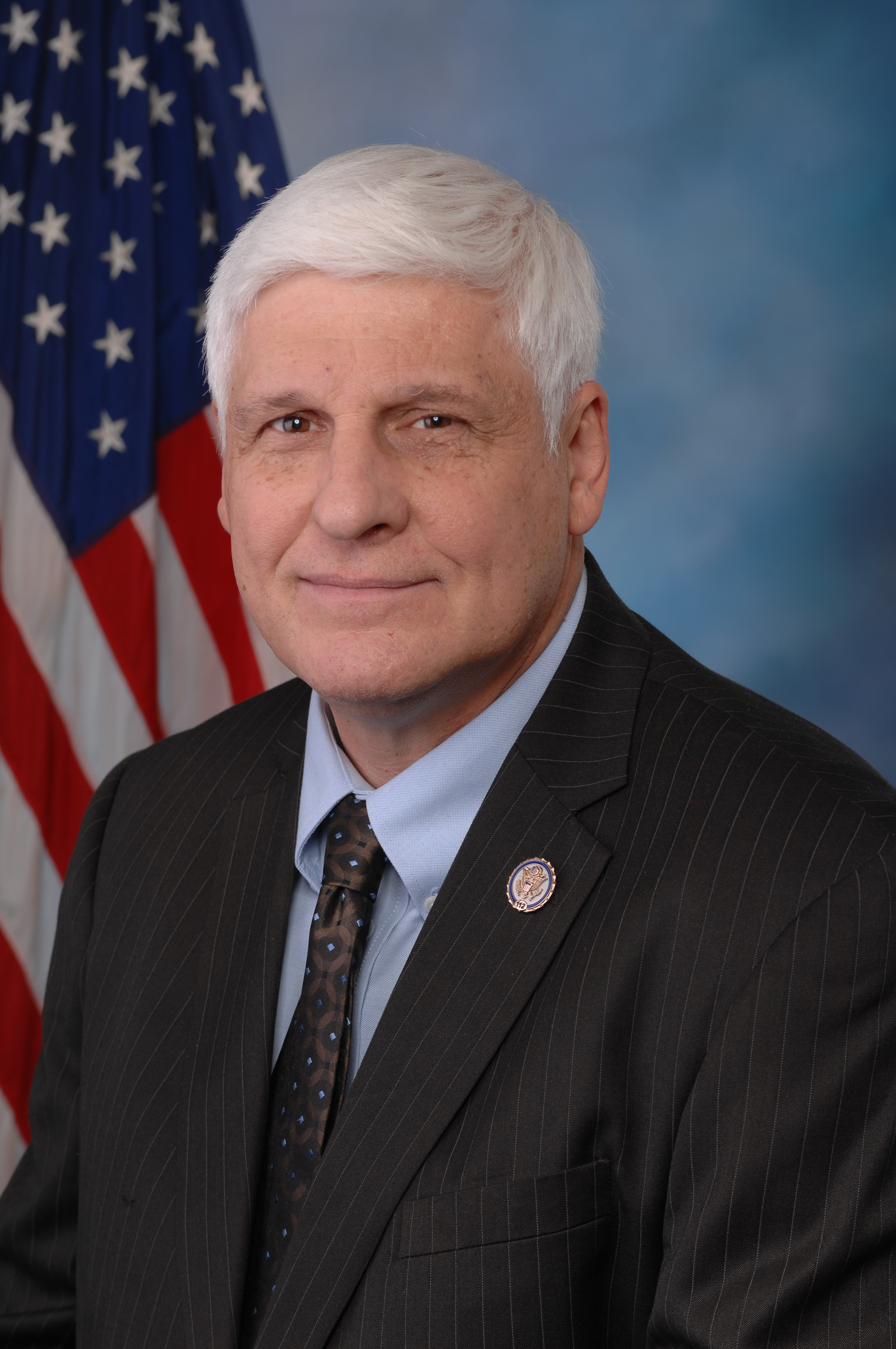
- Official portrait, 2011

Member of the U.S. House of Representatives from Ohio
- In office January 3, 2011 – January 3, 2023
- Preceded by: Zack Space
- Succeeded by: Max Miller
- Constituency: 18th district (2011–2013); 7th district (2013–2023)

Member of the Ohio Senate from the 22nd district
- In office January 5, 2009 – January 3, 2011
- Preceded by: Ron Amstutz
- Succeeded by: Larry Obhof

Member of the Ohio House of Representatives from the 97th district
- In office January 3, 2003 – January 3, 2009
- Preceded by: Bryan Flannery
- Succeeded by: Dave Hall

Personal details
- Born: Robert Brian Gibbs; June 14, 1954 (age 72) Peru, Indiana, U.S.
- Party: Republican
- Spouse: Jody Cox (m. 1977)
- Children: 3
- Education: Ohio State University Agricultural Technical Institute (AS)

Robert Brian Gibbs (born June 14, 1954) is an American politician who served as the U.S. representative for Ohio's 7th congressional district from 2011 to 2023. He is a member of the Republican Party. In April 2022, Gibbs announced he was not seeking reelection.

== Early life, education, and agricultural career ==
Gibbs was born on June 14, 1954, in Peru, Indiana. His family moved to Cleveland in the 1960s, and Gibbs graduated from Bay High School. In 1974, he graduated from the Ohio State University Agricultural Technical Institute and moved to Lakeville, Ohio, where he co-founded Hidden Hollow Farms, Ltd. Formerly a producer of swine, Hidden Hollow Farms now produces corn and soybeans.

Gibbs served as president of the Ohio Farm Bureau Federation, Ohio's largest agriculture organization. He first joined the Ohio Farm Bureau board of trustees in 1985. Gibbs also served as a board member of the Farm Bureau Bank, the Ohio Livestock Coalition, the Ohio Cooperative Council, and the Ohio Farm Bureau Alliance. He was president of the Loudonville Farmers Equity Company in Loudonville, Ohio, where he served on the board for 12 years. Gibbs has also served as president of the Holmes County extension advisory committee, the Holmes County Farm Bureau, and as a supervisor for the Holmes County Soil & Water Conservation Service.

== Ohio House of Representatives ==

=== Elections ===
Gibbs was elected to the Ohio General Assembly in 2002, defeating Democrat Tom Mason of Ashland for a newly drawn district in the Ohio House. He was reelected in 2004 in a rematch against Mason. In the 2006 election, Gibbs defeated Democratic nominee James P. Riley, a former township trustee from Sullivan, Ohio, with 60% of the vote. In 2009, Gibbs ran for Ohio Senate to fill the seat vacated by state senator Ron Amstutz due to term limits.

=== Tenure ===
In 2006 Gibbs was appointed a member of the special task force to study eminent domain and its use and application in Ohio. The committee spent most of the year studying the issue and issued its final report in August 2006 with recommendations to the General Assembly.

=== Committee assignments ===
During his last term Gibbs was chairman of the House ways and means committee. He was also a member of the agriculture & natural resources committee, financial institutions, real estate and securities committee, health care access and affordability committee, and the insurance committee.

== Ohio Senate ==
=== Elections ===
Gibbs won election to the Ohio Senate in 2008, and began his first term in 2009. On August 16, 2007, he announced his he candidacy for the 22nd district senate seat being vacated by the term-limited incumbent senator, Ron Amstutz. Gibbs originally expected to face a primary challenge from state representative Jim Carmichael, but Carmichael dropped out of the race on October 21 in order to run for Wayne County commissioner. In the general election Gibbs defeated Democratic nominee James E. Riley, a job/security representative for the U.A.W. international union, with 59% of the vote.

After winning election to Congress in 2010, Gibbs resigned from the Senate after serving half of one term.

== U.S. House of Representatives ==
=== Elections ===
==== 2010 ====
Gibbs faced Democratic incumbent Zack Space and Constitution Party nominee Lindsey Sutton in the general election. He won the Republican primary in an 8-way field. Following close results and a recount, Gibbs was certified the winner on June 4, a month after the primary.

On November 2, Gibbs defeated Space in the general election by nearly 14%. Gibbs won 14 of the 16 counties in the district.

==== 2012 ====
After redistricting, Gibbs decided to run in the newly redrawn Ohio's 7th congressional district. He defeated Democratic nominee Joyce Healy-Abrams in the November general election.

==== 2014 ====
Gibbs was reelected to a third term unopposed.

==== 2016 ====
Gibbs was reelected to a fourth term, defeating Democrat Roy Rich and independent Dan Phillip with 64% of the vote.

==== 2018 ====
Gibbs was reelected to a fifth term, defeating Democrat Ken Harbaugh with 58.7% of the vote.

==== 2020 ====
Gibbs was reelected to a sixth term, defeating Democrat Quentin Potter and Libertarian Brandon Lape with 67.5% of the vote.

=== Tenure ===
On March 4, 2013, Gibbs introduced the Reducing Regulatory Burdens Act of 2013 (H.R. 935; 113th Congress), a bill that would prohibit the Environmental Protection Agency (EPA) and states authorized to issue a permit under the National Pollutant Discharge Elimination System (NPDES) from requiring a permit for some discharges of pesticides authorized for use under the Federal Insecticide, Fungicide, and Rodenticide Act (FIFRA). In 2018, Gibbs was supported by the Great America Committee, a political action committee registered by Vice President Mike Pence.

In 2015, Gibbs cosponsored a resolution to amend the US constitution to ban same-sex marriage.

In December 2020, Gibbs was one of 126 Republican members of the House of Representatives to sign an amicus brief in support of Texas v. Pennsylvania, a lawsuit filed at the United States Supreme Court contesting the results of the 2020 presidential election, in which Joe Biden defeated incumbent Donald Trump. The Supreme Court declined to hear the case on the basis that Texas lacked standing under Article III of the Constitution to challenge the results of an election held by another state.

On January 6, 2021, Gibbs objected to the certification of the 2020 presidential election results in Congress based on false claims of voter fraud. On April 6, 2022, he announced that he would not seek reelection in 2022, blaming the redistricting "circus", referring to the still unresolved Ohio congressional map. "These long, drawn-out processes, in which the Ohio Supreme Court can take weeks and months to deliberate while demanding responses and filings from litigants within days, is detrimental to the state and does not serve the people of Ohio", he said.

Gibbs supported efforts to impeach President Biden. In September 2021, Gibbs introduced a resolution to impeach Biden for his handling of United States-Mexico border security, his extension of the federal COVID-19 eviction moratorium, and his handling of the withdrawal of United States troops from Afghanistan. In August 2021, Gibbs co-sponsored a resolution to impeach Alejandro Mayorkas, Biden's Secretary of Homeland Security.

=== Committee assignments ===
- Committee on Agriculture
  - Subcommittee on Conservation, Energy, and Forestry
  - Subcommittee on General Farm Commodities and Risk Management
- Committee on Transportation and Infrastructure
  - Subcommittee on Economic Development, Public Buildings and Emergency Management
  - Subcommittee on Highways and Transit
  - Subcommittee on Water Resources and Environment (chair)

=== Caucus memberships ===
- Republican Study Committee
- Republican Main Street Partnership
- Congressional Constitution Caucus
- Congressional Western Caucus

== Personal life ==
Gibbs is married to Jody Cox of Wooster, Ohio. They have three children and are members of Nashville United Methodist Church in Nashville, Ohio.

== Electoral history ==
Election results
Year	Office	Election	Subject	Party	Votes	%	Opponent	Party	Votes	%	Opponent	Party	Votes	%	
2002	Ohio House of Representatives	General	Bob Gibbs	Republican	18,182	62.44%	Thomas Mason	Democratic	10,939	37.56%					
2004	Ohio House of Representatives	General	Bob Gibbs	Republican	30,097	64.80%	Thomas Mason	Democratic	16,352	35.20%					
2006	Ohio House of Representatives	General	Bob Gibbs	Republican	21,853	60.48%	James E. Riley	Democratic	14,280	39.52%					
2008	Ohio Senate	General	Bob Gibbs	Republican	90,111	59.05%	James E. Riley	Democratic	62,504	40.96%					
2010	U.S. House of Representatives	General	Bob Gibbs	Republican	107,426	53.86%	Zack Space	Democratic	80,756	40.49%	Lindsey Sutton	Constitution	11,244	5.64%	*
2012	U.S. House of Representatives	General	Bob Gibbs	Republican	178,104	56.40%	Joyce Healy-Abrams	Democratic	137,708	43.60%					
2014	U.S. House of Representatives	General	Bob Gibbs	Republican	143,959	100.00%									
2016	U.S. House of Representatives	General	Bob Gibbs	Republican	198,221	64.04%	Roy Rich	Democratic	89,638	28.96%	Dan Phillip	Independent	21,694	7.01%	
2018	U.S. House of Representatives	General	Bob Gibbs	Republican	150,317	58.85%	Ken Harbaugh	Democratic	105,105	41.15%					
2020	U.S. House of Representatives	General	Bob Gibbs	Republican	236,607	67.05%	Quentin Potter	Democratic	102,271	29.02%	Brandon Lape	Libertarian	11,671	3.03%	

*In 2010, write-in candidate Mark Pitrone received 20 votes.

U.S. House of Representatives
Preceded by Zack Space	Member of the U.S. House of Representatives from Ohio's 18th congressional district 2011–2013	Constituency abolished
Preceded by Steve Austria	Member of the U.S. House of Representatives from Ohio's 7th congressional district 2013–2023	Succeeded by Max Miller
U.S. order of precedence (ceremonial)
Preceded by Bob McEwen as Former U.S. Representative	Order of precedence of the United States as Former U.S. Representative	Succeeded by Bill Johnson as Former U.S. Representative
