= United States House Transportation Subcommittee on Aviation =

American legislative committee

Subcommittee of Committee on Transportation and Infrastructure
- Active United States House of Representatives; 119th Congress

Leadership
- Chair: Troy Nehls (R)
- Ranking Member: André Carson (D)

Structure
- Seats: 39 (38 currently filled) 20/21 18/18
- Political parties: Majority (20): Republican (20); Minority (18): Democratic (18)

Meeting place
- 2165, Rayburn House Office Building; Washington, D.C. 20515

Phone number
- (202)-225-9446

The Subcommittee on Aviation is a subcommittee within the House Transportation and Infrastructure Committee.

== Jurisdiction ==
The Subcommittee on Aviation has jurisdiction over all aspects of civil aviation, including safety, infrastructure, labor, commerce, and international issues. All programs of the Federal Aviation Administration (FAA) except for research activities, are within the purview of the Subcommittee.

The Aviation Subcommittee is also traditionally the lead subcommittee with jurisdiction over the National Transportation Safety Board (NTSB), the federal agency responsible for investigating civil aviation accidents and other transportation accidents. The Essential Air Service program, which ensures commercial air service to smaller communities, the war risk insurance program, which provides insurance coverage for commercial flights to high-risk parts of the world, the National Mediation Board (NMB), and passenger and cargo commercial space transportation also fall within the purview of the Aviation Subcommittee.

== Members, 119th Congress ==
Majority	Minority
Troy Nehls, Texas, Chair; Thomas Massie, Kentucky; Scott Perry, Pennsylvania; Brian Mast, Florida; Pete Stauber, Minnesota; Tim Burchett, Tennessee; Dusty Johnson, South Dakota; Jeff Van Drew, New Jersey; Tracey Mann, Kansas; Burgess Owens, Utah; Tony Wied, Wisconsin, Vice Chair; Tom Barrett, Michigan; Nick Begich III, Alaska; Rob Bresnahan, Pennsylvania; Jeff Hurd, Colorado; Jefferson Shreve, Indiana; Addison McDowell, North Carolina; Brad Knott, North Carolina; Kimberlyn King-Hinds, Northern Mariana Islands; Bob Onder, Missouri; Vacancy	Steve Cohen, Tennessee, Ranking Member; Sharice Davids, Kansas; Hillary Scholten, Michigan; Robert Garcia, California; Hank Johnson, Georgia; André Carson, Indiana; Julia Brownley, California; Frederica Wilson, Florida; Mark DeSaulnier, California; Valerie Foushee, North Carolina; Chris Deluzio, Pennsylvania; Nellie Pou, New Jersey, Vice Ranking Member; Laura Gillen, New York; Eleanor Holmes Norton, District of Columbia; Dina Titus, Nevada; Salud Carbajal, California; Greg Stanton, Arizona; Chuy García, Illinois
Ex officio
Sam Graves, Missouri	Rick Larsen, Washington

== Historical membership rosters ==
=== 115th Congress ===
Majority	Minority
Frank LoBiondo, New Jersey, Chairman; Don Young, Alaska; Jimmy Duncan, Tennessee; Sam Graves, Missouri; Duncan D. Hunter, California; Blake Farenthold, Texas; Daniel Webster, Florida; Jeff Denham, California; Thomas Massie, Kentucky; Mark Meadows, North Carolina; Scott Perry, Pennsylvania; Rodney L. Davis, Illinois; Mark Sanford, South Carolina; Rob Woodall, Georgia; Todd Rokita, Indiana; Barbara Comstock, Virginia; Doug LaMalfa, California; Bruce Westerman, Arkansas; Paul Mitchell, Michigan, Vice Chair; Jason Lewis, Minnesota	Rick Larsen, Washington, Ranking Member; Eddie Bernice Johnson, Texas; Daniel Lipinski, Illinois; André Carson, Indiana; Cheri Bustos, Illinois; Eleanor Holmes Norton, District of Columbia; Dina Titus, Nevada; Sean Patrick Maloney, New York; Julia Brownley, California; Donald Payne Jr., New Jersey; Brenda Lawrence, Michigan; Mike Capuano, Massachusetts; Grace Napolitano, California; Steve Cohen, Tennessee; Hank Johnson, Georgia; Rick Nolan, Minnesota
Ex officio
Bill Shuster, Pennsylvania	Peter DeFazio, Oregon

=== 116th Congress ===
Majority	Minority
Rick Larsen, Washington, Chair; André Carson, Indiana; Stacey Plaskett, U.S. Virgin Islands; Stephen Lynch, Massachusetts; Eleanor Holmes Norton, District of Columbia; Dan Lipinski, Illinois; Steve Cohen, Tennessee; Hank Johnson, Georgia; Dina Titus, Nevada; Julia Brownley, California; Anthony Brown, Maryland; Greg Stanton, Arizona; Colin Allred, Texas; Chuy García, Illinois; Eddie Bernice Johnson, Texas; Sean Patrick Maloney, New York; Donald Payne, New Jersey; Sharice Davids, Kansas; Angie Craig, Minnesota; Grace Napolitano, California; Salud Carbajal, California	Garret Graves, Louisiana, Ranking Member; Don Young, Alaska; Daniel Webster, Florida; Thomas Massie, Kentucky; Scott Perry, Pennsylvania; Rob Woodall, Georgia; John Katko, New York; David Rouzer, North Carolina; Lloyd Smucker, Pennsylvania; Paul Mitchell, Michigan; Brian Mast, Florida; Mike Gallagher, Wisconsin; Brian Fitzpatrick, Pennsylvania; Troy Balderson, Ohio; Ross Spano, Florida; Pete Stauber, Minnesota
Ex officio
Peter DeFazio, Oregon	Sam Graves, Missouri

=== 117th Congress ===
Majority	Minority
Rick Larsen, Washington, Chair; Steve Cohen, Tennessee; André Carson, Indiana; Sharice Davids, Kansas; Kai Kahele, Hawaii; Nikema Williams, Georgia; Hank Johnson, Georgia; Dina Titus, Nevada; Sean Patrick Maloney, New York; Julia Brownley, California; Donald Payne Jr., New Jersey; Mark DeSaulnier, California; Stephen Lynch, Massachusetts; Anthony Brown, Maryland; Greg Stanton, Arizona; Colin Allred, Texas; Conor Lamb, Pennsylvania, Vice Chair; Eleanor Holmes Norton, District of Columbia; Eddie Bernice Johnson, Texas; John Garamendi, California	Garret Graves, Louisiana, Ranking Member; Don Young, Alaska (until March 18, 2022); Thomas Massie, Kentucky; Scott Perry, Pennsylvania; John Katko, New York; Brian Mast, Florida; Mike Gallagher, Wisconsin; Brian Fitzpatrick, Pennsylvania; Troy Balderson, Ohio; Pete Stauber, Minnesota; Tim Burchett, Tennessee; Jeff Van Drew, New Jersey; Troy Nehls, Texas; Nancy Mace, South Carolina; Beth Van Duyne, Texas; Carlos A. Giménez, Florida; Michelle Steel, California
Ex officio
Peter DeFazio, Oregon	Sam Graves, Missouri

=== 118th Congress ===
Majority	Minority
Garret Graves, Louisiana, Chair; Rick Crawford, Arkansas; Thomas Massie, Kentucky; Scott Perry, Pennsylvania; Bruce Westerman, Arkansas; Brian Mast, Florida; Pete Stauber, Minnesota; Tim Burchett, Tennessee; Dusty Johnson, South Dakota; Jeff Van Drew, New Jersey; Tracey Mann, Kansas; Burgess Owens, Utah; Rudy Yakym, Indiana, Vice Chair; Lori Chavez-DeRemer, Oregon; Thomas Kean Jr., New Jersey; Anthony D'Esposito, New York; John James, Michigan; Marc Molinaro, New York; Mike Collins, Georgia; Aaron Bean, Florida; Vince Fong, California (from June 3, 2024)	Steve Cohen, Tennessee, Ranking Member; Hank Johnson, Georgia; André Carson, Indiana; Julia Brownley, California; Mark DeSaulnier, California; Greg Stanton, Arizona; Colin Allred, Texas; Sharice Davids, Kansas; Chuy García, Illinois; Jake Auchincloss, Massachusetts; Mary Peltola, Alaska; Dina Titus, Nevada; Donald Payne Jr., New Jersey (until April 24, 2024); Salud Carbajal, California; Robert Menendez, New Jersey; Eleanor Holmes Norton, District of Columbia; Frederica Wilson, Florida
Ex officio
Sam Graves, Missouri	Rick Larsen, Washington
