= United States House Transportation Subcommittee on Water Resources and Environment =

Conservation-based subcommittee of the US House of Representatives

Subcommittee of Committee on Transportation and Infrastructure
- Active United States House of Representatives; 119th Congress

Leadership
- Chair: Mike Collins (R)
- Ranking Member: Frederica Wilson (D)

Structure
- Seats: 33 (31 currently filled) 16/18 15/15
- Political parties: Majority (16): Republican (16); Minority (15): Democratic (15)

Meeting place
- 2165, Rayburn House Office Building; Washington, D.C. 20515

Phone number
- (202)-225-9446

The Subcommittee on Water Resources and Environment is a subcommittee within the House Transportation and Infrastructure Committee.

== Jurisdiction ==
The subcommittee has jurisdiction over water conservation, pollution control, infrastructure, and hazardous waste cleanup, the civil works programs of the U.S. Army Corps of Engineers, and the Clean Water Act programs of the U.S. Environmental Protection Agency (EPA). Other agencies under the subcommittee’s jurisdiction include the Tennessee Valley Authority, the Great Lakes St. Lawrence Seaway Development Corporation, the International Boundary Water Commission, and certain programs of the National Oceanic and Atmospheric Administration and the Natural Resources Conservation Service.

== Members, 119th Congress ==
Majority	Minority
Mike Collins, Georgia, Chair; Rick Crawford, Arkansas; Thomas Massie, Kentucky; Brian Babin, Texas; Mike Bost, Illinois; Doug LaMalfa, California; Bruce Westerman, Arkansas; Brian Mast, Florida; Tracey Mann, Kansas; Eric Burlison, Missouri; Kevin Kiley, California (until March 18, 2026); Vince Fong, California; Tony Wied, Wisconsin; Jeff Hurd, Colorado; David Taylor, Ohio, Vice Chair; Brad Knott, North Carolina; Bob Onder, Missouri; Vacancy	Frederica Wilson, Florida, Ranking Member; John Garamendi, California; Jared Huffman, California; Pat Ryan, New York; Val Hoyle, Oregon; Emilia Sykes, Ohio; Laura Friedman, California; Shomari Figures, Alabama; Julia Brownley, California; Mark DeSaulnier, California; Chris Pappas, New Hampshire; Hillary Scholten, Michigan, Vice Ranking Member; Nellie Pou, New Jersey; Laura Gillen, New York; Eleanor Holmes Norton, District of Columbia
Ex officio
Sam Graves, Missouri	Rick Larsen, Washington

== Historical membership rosters ==
=== 115th Congress ===
Majority	Minority
Garret Graves, Louisiana, Chair; Rick Crawford, Arkansas; Bob Gibbs, Ohio; Daniel Webster, Florida; Thomas Massie, Kentucky; Rodney L. Davis, Illinois; Mark Sanford, South Carolina; Rob Woodall, Georgia; Todd Rokita, Indiana; John Katko, New York; Brian Babin, Texas; David Rouzer, North Carolina; Mike Bost, Illinois; Randy Weber, Texas; Doug LaMalfa, California; Drew Ferguson, Georgia; Brian Mast, Florida, Vice Chair	Grace Napolitano, California, Ranking Member; Lois Frankel, Florida; Frederica Wilson, Florida; Jared Huffman, California; Alan Lowenthal, California; Eddie Bernice Johnson, Texas; John Garamendi, California; Dina Titus, Nevada; Sean Patrick Maloney, New York; Elizabeth Esty, Connecticut; Cheri Bustos, Illinois; Julia Brownley, California; Brenda Lawrence, Michigan
Ex officio
Bill Shuster, Pennsylvania	Peter DeFazio, Oregon

=== 116th Congress ===
Majority	Minority
Grace Napolitano, California, Chair; Debbie Mucarsel-Powell, Florida, Vice Chair; Eddie Bernice Johnson, Texas; John Garamendi, California; Jared Huffman, California; Alan Lowenthal, California; Mark DeSaulnier, California; Salud Carbajal, California; Adriano Espaillat, New York; Lizzie Fletcher, Texas; Abby Finkenauer, Iowa; Antonio Delgado, New York; Chris Pappas, New Hampshire; Angie Craig, Minnesota; Harley Rouda, California; Frederica Wilson, Florida; Stephen Lynch, Massachusetts; Tom Malinowski, New Jersey	Bruce Westerman, Arkansas, Ranking Member; Daniel Webster, Florida; Thomas Massie, Kentucky; Rob Woodall, Georgia; Brian Babin, Texas; Garret Graves, Louisiana; David Rouzer, North Carolina; Mike Bost, Illinois; Randy Weber, Texas; Doug LaMalfa, California; Brian Mast, Florida; Gary Palmer, Alabama; Jenniffer González, Puerto Rico
Ex officio
Peter DeFazio, Oregon	Sam Graves, Missouri

=== 117th Congress ===
Majority	Minority
Grace Napolitano, California, Chair; Jared Huffman, California; Eddie Bernice Johnson, Texas; John Garamendi, California; Alan Lowenthal, California; Tom Malinowski, New Jersey; Antonio Delgado, New York; Chris Pappas, New Hampshire; Carolyn Bourdeaux, Georgia, Vice Chair; Frederica Wilson, Florida; Salud Carbajal, California; Greg Stanton, Arizona; Eleanor Holmes Norton, District of Columbia; Steve Cohen, Tennessee	David Rouzer, North Carolina, Ranking Member; Daniel Webster, Florida; John Katko, New York; Brian Babin, Texas; Garret Graves, Louisiana; Mike Bost, Illinois; Randy Weber, Texas; Doug LaMalfa, California; Bruce Westerman, Arkansas; Brian Mast, Florida; Jenniffer González, Puerto Rico; Nancy Mace, South Carolina
Ex officio
Peter DeFazio, Oregon	Sam Graves, Missouri

=== 118th Congress ===
Majority	Minority
David Rouzer, North Carolina, Chair; Daniel Webster, Florida; Thomas Massie, Kentucky; Brian Babin, Texas; Mike Bost, Illinois; Doug LaMalfa, California; Bruce Westerman, Arkansas; Brian Mast, Florida; Jenniffer González Colón, Puerto Rico; Burgess Owens, Utah; Eric Burlison, Missouri; John James, Michigan, Vice Chair; Derrick Van Orden, Wisconsin; Brandon Williams, New York; Mike Collins, Georgia; Mike Ezell, Mississippi; John Duarte, California; Celeste Maloy, Utah (from December 9, 2023)	Grace Napolitano, California, Ranking Member; John Garamendi, California; Emilia Sykes, Ohio; Jared Huffman, California; Frederica Wilson, Florida; Pat Ryan, New York; Val Hoyle, Oregon; Hillary Scholten, Michigan; Julia Brownley, California; Mark DeSaulnier, California; Greg Stanton, Arizona; Chris Pappas, New Hampshire; Seth Moulton, Massachusetts; Troy Carter, Louisiana; Eleanor Holmes Norton, District of Columbia
Ex officio
Sam Graves, Missouri	Rick Larsen, Washington
