= Debbie Mucarsel-Powell =

American politician (born 1971)

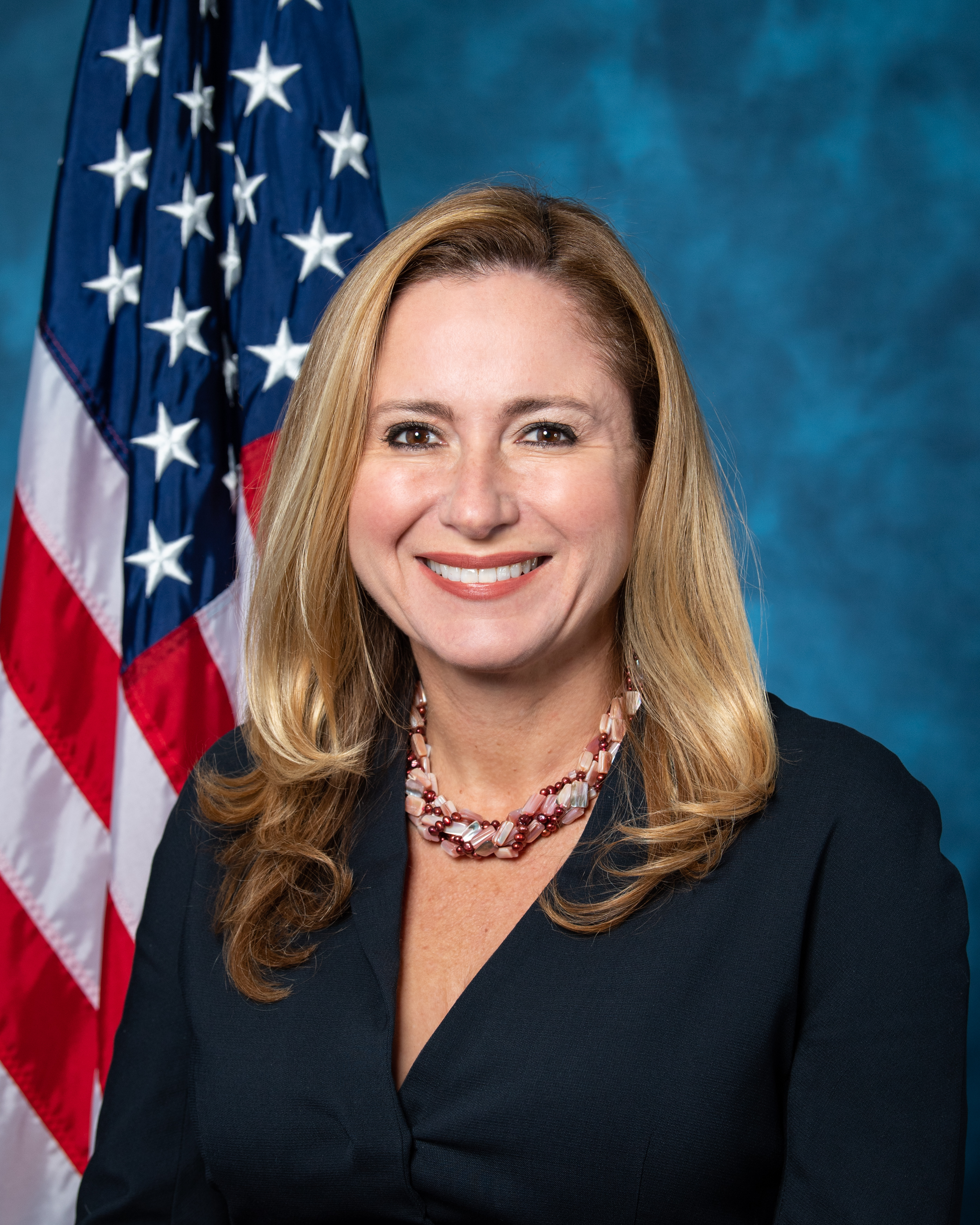
- Official portrait, 2019

Member of the U.S. House of Representatives from Florida's 26th district
- In office January 3, 2019 – January 3, 2021
- Preceded by: Carlos Curbelo
- Succeeded by: Carlos Giménez

Personal details
- Born: Debbie Mucarsel Gil; January 18, 1971 (age 55) Guayaquil, Ecuador
- Party: Democratic
- Spouse: Robert Powell
- Children: 3
- Education: Pitzer College (BA); Claremont Graduate University (MA)
- Website: Official website

Debbie Mucarsel-Powell (/ˈmuːkɑːrsɛl/ MOO-kar-sell; born January 18, 1971) is an American politician and academic administrator serving as the Executive Director of the Graduate School of Political Management at George Washington University since 2025. A member of the Democratic Party, she served as the U.S. representative for Florida's 26th congressional district from 2019 to 2021.

Born in Ecuador, Mucarsel-Powell made history as the first Ecuadorian-American and first South American-born immigrant to serve as a member of the U.S. Congress. She was defeated in her 2020 reelection bid by Miami-Dade County mayor Carlos Giménez. As a congresswoman, Mucarsel-Powell voiced support for ousting president Nicolás Maduro of Venezuela and was part of a delegation that met with opposition leader Juan Guaidó when he visited the United States.

Before entering politics, Mucarsel-Powell worked for various nonprofits, including the Hope Center, Zoo Miami Foundation, and the Coral Restoration Foundation. She was the associate vice president for advancement and later an associate dean at the FIU Herbert Wertheim College of Medicine.

In August 2023, Mucarsel-Powell announced she was running for the United States Senate in 2024 against incumbent Republican Rick Scott. She won the Democratic nomination for the seat on August 20, 2024 making her the first Latina Democrat to win a US Senate nomination in Florida. In November, she lost the general election to Scott.

== Early life and education ==
Mucarsel-Powell was born in Guayaquil, Ecuador, and raised in Miami, Florida, the daughter of Imelda Gil and Guido Mucarsel Yunes. After her parents' divorce, she immigrated to the U.S. at age 14 with her mother and three sisters. She began working in High School in a doughnut shop and continued to work to help support her family, who shared a one-bedroom apartment. In 1995, her father was shot to death outside of his home in Ecuador.

Mucarsel-Powell attended Pomona Catholic High School in Pomona, California, graduating in 1988. She earned a Bachelor of Arts degree in political science from Pitzer College in 1992 and a Master of Arts in international political economy from Claremont Graduate University in 1996.

== Early career ==
Mucarsel-Powell worked for nonprofits, including the Hope Center, Zoo Miami Foundation, and the Coral Restoration Foundation. She worked in fundraising for Florida International University (FIU) and was the associate vice president for advancement at the FIU Herbert Wertheim College of Medicine.

Mucarsel-Powell volunteered for the presidential campaigns of John Kerry and Barack Obama. In 2016, she ran unsuccessfully against Anitere Flores for the Florida Senate.

== U.S. House of Representatives ==
=== Elections ===
==== 2018 ====
2018 U.S. House election results for Florida's 26th congressional district

In August 2017, Mucarsel-Powell announced she would challenge Republican representative Carlos Curbelo in Florida's 26th congressional district of the United States House of Representatives in the 2018 elections. She defeated Demetries Grimes in the Democratic Party primary election with 63.5% of the vote.

In the November 6 general election, Mucarsel-Powell defeated Curbelo with 50.9% of the vote, becoming the first Ecuadorian-born person to be elected to Congress and the first woman to represent Florida's 26th congressional district.

==== 2020 ====
In the prelude to the 2020 elections, Mucarsel-Powell's seat was included as a target of the National Republican Congressional Committee. Her Republican opponent, Carlos A. Giménez, was then the mayor of Miami-Dade County, and was endorsed by President Donald Trump. Mucarsel-Powell lost to Giménez, with 48.6% of the vote to Giménez's 51.3%.

=== Tenure ===
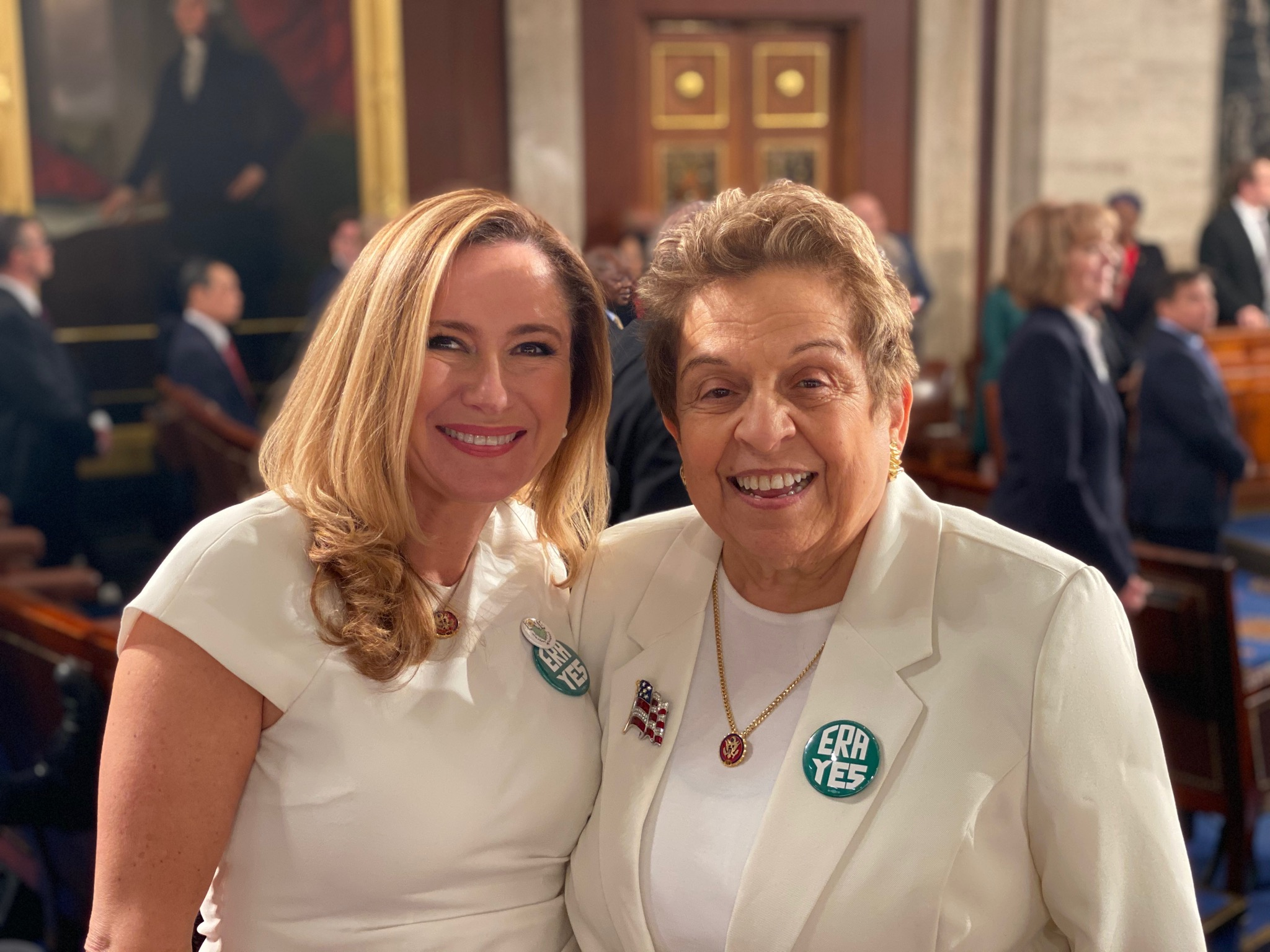
Mucarsel-Powell with fellow Florida congresswoman Donna Shalala at the 2020 State of the Union

Within the first month of her tenure, Mucarsel-Powell introduced a bill to provide the people of Venezuela with humanitarian aid amid the ongoing socioeconomic crisis, which had worsened with the presidential crisis beginning in January 2019. She voiced support for ousting president Nicolás Maduro and recognizing the transitional government led by assembly speaker Juan Guaidó. Mucarsel-Powell was among a delegation of House Democrats that met with Guaidó when he visited the U.S. in February 2020.

On December 18, 2019, Mucarsel-Powell voted to impeach President Trump for abuse of power and obstruction of Congress.

=== Committee assignments ===
- Committee on the Judiciary
  - Subcommittee on Crime, Terrorism and Homeland Security
  - Subcommittee on Immigration and Citizenship
- Committee on Transportation and Infrastructure
  - Subcommittee on Economic Development, Public Buildings and Emergency Management
  - Subcommittee on Water Resources and Environment

=== Caucus memberships ===
- Congressional Animal Protection Caucus
- Congressional Caucus for Women's Issues
- Congressional Hispanic Caucus
- Congressional LGBT Equality Caucus
- Congressional Progressive Caucus
- New Democrat Coalition

== Post-congressional career ==
In April 2021, Mucarsel-Powell joined Giffords as a senior adviser, intending to lobby the U.S. Senate to pass the Bipartisan Background Checks Act.

She was appointed the Executive Director of the George Washington University Graduate School of Political Management on September 1, 2025.

=== 2024 U.S. Senate campaign ===
Mucarsel-Powell announced her campaign for the U.S. Senate in August 2023, challenging incumbent Republican Rick Scott. She won the Democratic primary with minor opposition on August 20, 2024, becoming the first Latina woman to be nominated for a Senate seat in Florida. Her campaign had raised more than $12 million by the day of the primary. She lost the general election, receiving 42.8% of the vote to Scott's 55.6%.

== Personal life ==
Mucarsel-Powell is of Ecuadorian and Lebanese ancestry and is a Roman Catholic. When she was 24 years old, a gunman killed her father outside his home in Ecuador. She and her husband, Robert Powell, have three children.

== Electoral history ==
=== 2016 ===
2016 Florida's 23rd Senate district election
Party	Candidate	Votes	%
Republican	Anitere Flores (incumbent)	97,343	54.24
Democratic	Debbie Mucarsel-Powell	82,117	45.76
Total votes		179,460	100.0
Republican hold			

=== 2018 ===
Democratic primary results
Party	Candidate	Votes	%
Democratic	Debbie Mucarsel-Powell	20,997	63.5
Democratic	Demetries Grimes	12,095	36.5
Total votes		33,092	100.0

2018 Florida's 26th congressional district election
Party	Candidate	Votes	%
Democratic	Debbie Mucarsel-Powell	119,797	50.9
Republican	Carlos Curbelo (incumbent)	115,678	49.1
Total votes		235,475	100.0
Democratic gain from Republican			

=== 2020 ===
Florida's 26th congressional district election, 2020
Party	Candidate	Votes	%
Republican	Carlos A. Giménez	177,211	51.3
Democratic	Debbie Mucarsel-Powell (incumbent)	165,377	48.6
Total votes		342,588	100.0
Republican gain from Democratic			

=== 2024 ===
Democratic primary results
Party	Candidate	Votes	%
Democratic	Debbie Mucarsel-Powell	747,397	68.5%
Democratic	Stanley Campbell	213,777	19.6%
Democratic	Brian Rush	73,013	6.7%
Democratic	Rod Joseph	56,961	5.2%
Total votes		1,091,148	100.0%

2024 United States Senate election in Florida
Party	Candidate	Votes	%	±%
Republican	Rick Scott (incumbent)	5,977,706	55.57%	+5.52%
Democratic	Debbie Mucarsel-Powell	4,603,077	42.79%	−7.14%
Independent	Ben Everidge	62,683	0.58%	N/A
Libertarian	Feena Bonoan	57,363	0.53%	N/A
Independent	Tuan TQ Nguyen	56,586	0.53%	N/A
Write-in		13	0.00%	-0.01%
Total votes		10,757,428	100.00%	N/A
Republican hold				

== See also ==
- List of Arab and Middle Eastern Americans in the United States Congress
- List of Hispanic and Latino Americans in the United States Congress
- Women in the United States House of Representatives

U.S. House of Representatives
Preceded by Carlos Curbelo	Member of the U.S. House of Representatives from Florida's 26th congressional district 2019–2021	Succeeded by Carlos A. Giménez
Party political offices
Preceded by Bill Nelson	Democratic nominee for U.S. Senator from Florida (Class 1); 2024	Most recent
U.S. order of precedence (ceremonial)
Preceded by Gwen Graham as Former U.S. Representative	Order of precedence of the United States as Former U.S. Representative	Succeeded by Ross Spano as Former U.S. Representative
