= United States House Committee on Transportation and Infrastructure =

Standing committee of the US House of Representatives

House Transportation Committee
Standing committee
- Active United States House of Representatives; 119th Congress

History
- Formed: January 2, 1947

Leadership
- Chair: Sam Graves (R); Since January 3, 2023
- Ranking Member: Rick Larsen (D); Since January 3, 2023

Structure
- Seats: 67 (67 currently filled) 36/36 31/31
- Political parties: Majority (36): Republican (35); Independent (1); Minority (31): Democratic (31)

Subcommittees
- Water Resources and Environment; Aviation; Coast Guard and Maritime Transportation; Highways and Transit; Economic Development, Public Buildings, and Emergency Management; Railroads, Pipelines, and Hazardous Materials

Meeting place
- 2165, Rayburn House Office Building; Washington, D.C. 20515

Website
- transportation.house.gov (Republican) democrats-transportation.house.gov (Democratic)

Phone number
- (202)-225-9446

The U.S. House Committee on Transportation and Infrastructure is a standing committee of the United States House of Representatives.

== History ==
The Committee on Transportation and Infrastructure was formerly known as the Committee on Public Works and Transportation from 1975 to 1994, and the Committee on Public Works between 1947 and 1974.

Under the Legislative Reorganization Act of 1946 the Committees on Public Buildings and Grounds (1837–1946), Rivers and Harbors (1883–1946), Roads (1913–1946), and the Flood Control (1916–1946) were combined to form the Committee on Public Works. Its jurisdiction from the beginning of the 80th Congress (1947–1948) through the 90th Congress (1967–1968) remained unchanged.

While these four original committees retained their separate identities, they were reduced to subcommittees. Additional subcommittees were formed for issues on Beach Erosion, 80th Congress (1947–1948) and for Watershed Development, 86th–90th congresses (1959–1968). Special Subcommittees included those: to Investigate Questionable Trade Practices, 80th Congress; to Study Civil Works, 82nd Congress (1951–1952); on the Federal-Aid Highway Program, 86th–90th congresses; and on Economic Development Programs, 89th–90th congresses (1965–1968). Ad Hoc Committees were established on Montana Flood Damage, 88th Congress (1963–1964); on Appalachian Regional Development, 88th–90th congresses; and on the 1967 Alaska Exposition, 89th Congress.

== Members, 119th Congress ==
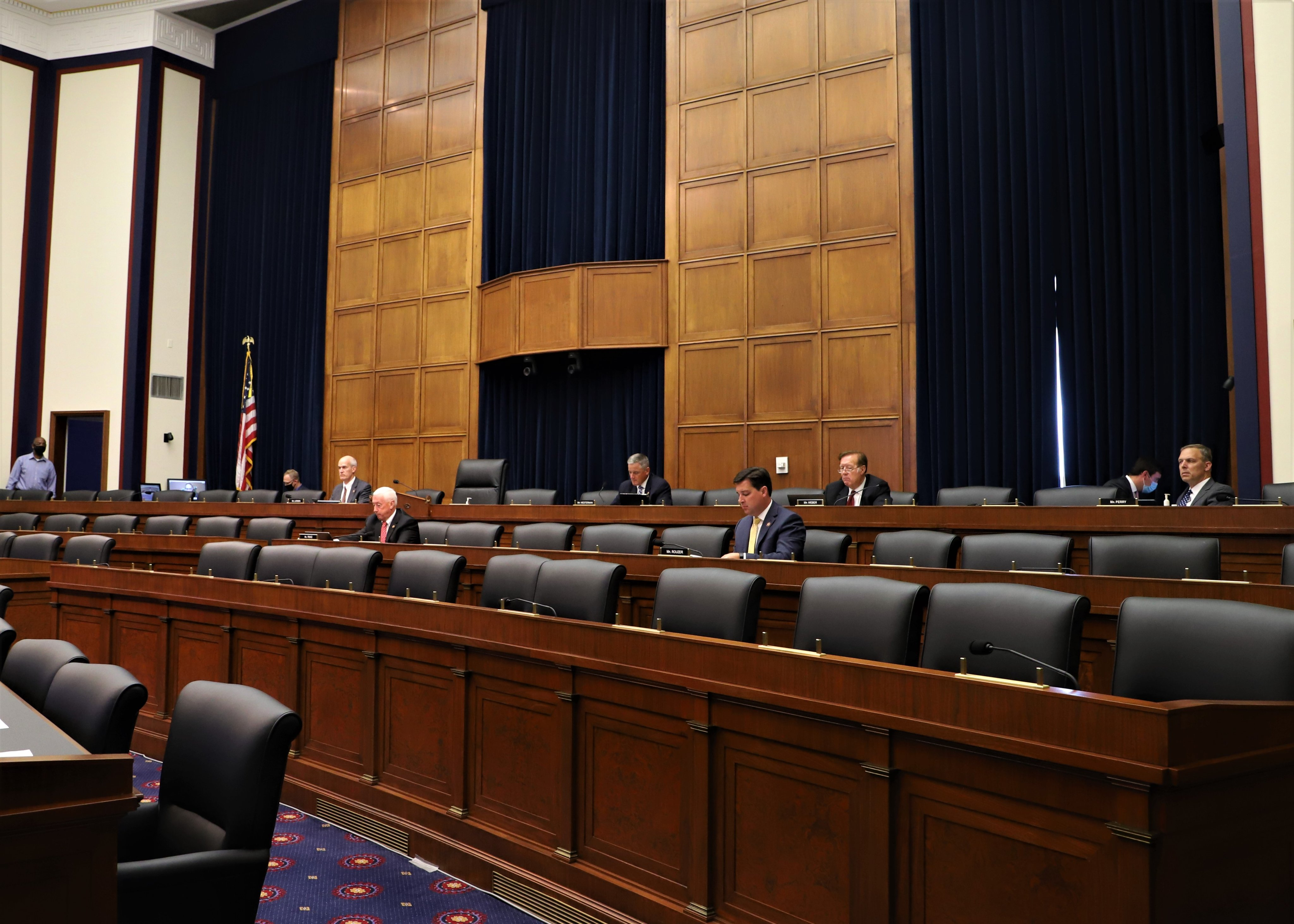
A social distancing committee meeting during the COVID-19 pandemic

Majority	Minority
Sam Graves, Missouri, Chair; Rick Crawford, Arkansas; Daniel Webster, Florida; Thomas Massie, Kentucky; Scott Perry, Pennsylvania; Brian Babin, Texas; David Rouzer, North Carolina; Mike Bost, Illinois; Doug LaMalfa, California (until January 6, 2026); Bruce Westerman, Arkansas; Brian Mast, Florida; Pete Stauber, Minnesota; Tim Burchett, Tennessee; Dusty Johnson, South Dakota; Jeff Van Drew, New Jersey; Troy Nehls, Texas; Tracey Mann, Kansas; Burgess Owens, Utah; Eric Burlison, Missouri; Mike Collins, Georgia; Mike Ezell, Mississippi, Vice Chair; Kevin Kiley, California (from April 15, 2026); Rudy Yakym, Indiana (from March 25, 2026); Vince Fong, California; Tony Wied, Wisconsin; Tom Barrett, Michigan; Nick Begich, Alaska; Rob Bresnahan, Pennsylvania; Jeff Hurd, Colorado; Jefferson Shreve, Indiana; Addison McDowell, North Carolina; David Taylor, Ohio; Brad Knott, North Carolina; Kimberlyn King-Hinds, Northern Mariana Islands; Mike Kennedy, Utah; Bob Onder, Missouri; Jimmy Patronis, Florida (from April 8, 2025); Clay Fuller, Georgia (from April 15, 2026); James Gallagher, California (from June 24, 2026)	Rick Larsen, Washington, Ranking Member; Eleanor Holmes Norton, District of Columbia; Jerry Nadler, New York; Steve Cohen, Tennessee; John Garamendi, California; Hank Johnson, Georgia; André Carson, Indiana; Dina Titus, Nevada; Jared Huffman, California; Julia Brownley, California; Frederica Wilson, Florida; Mark DeSaulnier, California; Salud Carbajal, California; Greg Stanton, Arizona; Sharice Davids, Kansas; Chuy García, Illinois; Chris Pappas, New Hampshire; Seth Moulton, Massachusetts; Marilyn Strickland, Washington; Pat Ryan, New York; Val Hoyle, Oregon; Emilia Sykes, Ohio, Vice Ranking Member; Hillary Scholten, Michigan; Valerie Foushee, North Carolina; Chris Deluzio, Pennsylvania; Robert Garcia, California; Nellie Pou, New Jersey; Kristen McDonald Rivet, Michigan; Laura Friedman, California; Laura Gillen, New York; Shomari Figures, Alabama; Maxwell Frost, Florida (from September 16, 2025)

Resolutions electing members: H.Res. 13 (Chair), H.Res. 14 (Ranking Member), H.Res. 38 (R), H.Res. 40 (D), H.Res. 300 (Patronis), H.Res. 721 (Frost), H.Res. 1135 (Yakym), H.Res. 1176 (Kiley and Fuller), H.Res. 1381 (Gallagher)

== Subcommittees ==
There are six subcommittees:

Subcommittee	Chair	Ranking Member
Aviation	Troy Nehls (R-TX)	Steve Cohen (D-TN)
Coast Guard and Maritime Transportation	Mike Ezell (R-MS)	Salud Carbajal (D-CA)
Economic Development, Public Buildings and Emergency Management	Scott Perry (R-PA)	Greg Stanton (D-AZ)
Highways and Transit	David Rouzer (R-NC)	Eleanor Holmes Norton (D-DC)
Railroads, Pipelines, and Hazardous Materials	Daniel Webster (R-FL)	Dina Titus (D-NV)
Water Resources and Environment	Mike Collins (R-GA)	Frederica Wilson (D-FL)

== Leadership ==
Chairs
Name	Party	State	Start	End
George Dondero	Republican	Michigan	1947	1949
William Whittington	Democratic	Mississippi	1949	1951
Charles Buckley	Democratic	New York	1951	1953
George Dondero	Republican	Michigan	1953	1955
Charles Buckley	Democratic	New York	1955	1965
George Fallon	Democratic	Maryland	1965	1971
John Blatnik	Democratic	Minnesota	1971	1974
Robert Jones	Democratic	Alabama	1975	1977
Harold Johnson	Democratic	California	1977	1981
James Howard	Democratic	New Jersey	1981	1988
Glenn Anderson	Democratic	California	1988	1991
Robert Roe	Democratic	New Jersey	1991	1993
Norman Mineta	Democratic	California	1993	1995
Bud Shuster	Republican	Pennsylvania	1995	2001
Don Young	Republican	Alaska	2001	2007
Jim Oberstar	Democratic	Minnesota	2007	2011
John Mica	Republican	Florida	2011	2013
Bill Shuster	Republican	Pennsylvania	2013	2019
Peter DeFazio	Democratic	Oregon	2019	2023
Sam Graves	Republican	Missouri	2023	present

Ranking members
Name	Party	State	Start	End
Joseph Mansfield	Democratic	Texas	1947	
William Whittington	Democratic	Mississippi	1947	1949
George Dondero	Republican	Michigan	1949	1953
Charles Buckley	Democratic	New York	1953	1955
George Dondero	Republican	Michigan	1955	1957
Harry McGregor	Republican	Ohio	1957	1959
James Auchincloss	Republican	New Jersey	1959	1967
William Cramer	Republican	Florida	1967	1971
Bill Harsha	Republican	Ohio	1971	1981
Don Clausen	Republican	California	1981	1983
Gene Snyder	Republican	Kentucky	1983	1987
John Hammerschmidt	Republican	Arkansas	1987	1993
Bud Shuster	Republican	Pennsylvania	1993	1995
Norman Mineta	Democratic	California	1995	
Jim Oberstar	Democratic	Minnesota	1995	2007
John Mica	Republican	Florida	2007	2011
Nick Rahall	Democratic	West Virginia	2011	2015
Peter DeFazio	Democratic	Oregon	2015	2019
Sam Graves	Republican	Missouri	2019	2023
Rick Larsen	Democratic	Washington	2023	present

== Historical membership rosters ==
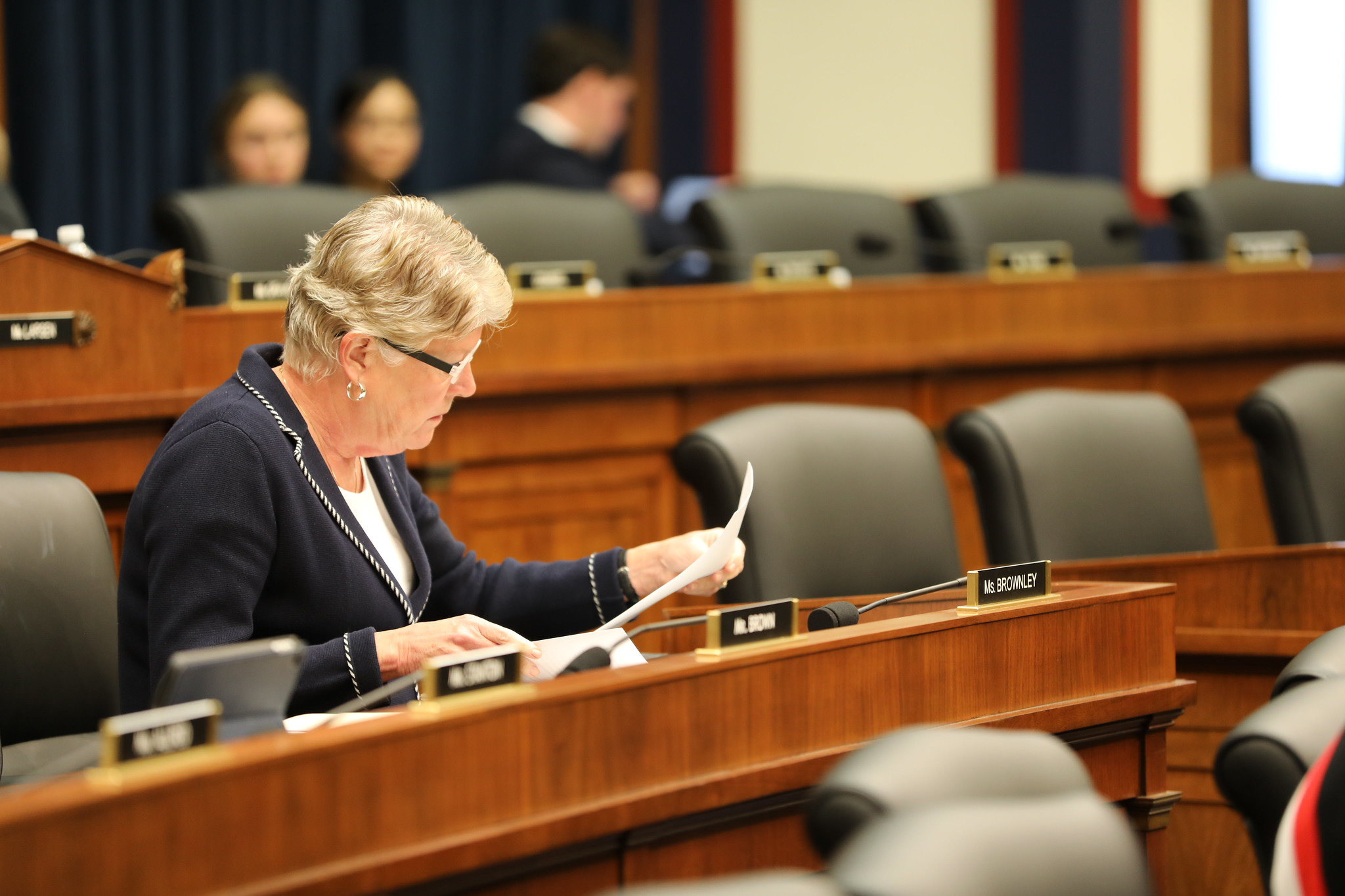
Congresswoman Julia Brownley during a Committee meeting in January 2020

=== 118th Congress ===
Majority	Minority
Sam Graves, Missouri, Chair; Rick Crawford, Arkansas; Daniel Webster, Florida; Thomas Massie, Kentucky; Scott Perry, Pennsylvania; Brian Babin, Texas; Garret Graves, Louisiana; David Rouzer, North Carolina; Mike Bost, Illinois; Doug LaMalfa, California; Bruce Westerman, Arkansas; Brian Mast, Florida; Jenniffer González, Puerto Rico; Pete Stauber, Minnesota; Tim Burchett, Tennessee; Dusty Johnson, South Dakota; Jeff Van Drew, New Jersey, Vice Chair; Troy Nehls, Texas; Lance Gooden, Texas; Tracey Mann, Kansas; Burgess Owens, Utah; Rudy Yakym, Indiana; Lori Chavez-DeRemer, Oregon; Chuck Edwards, North Carolina (until December 6, 2023); Thomas Kean Jr., New Jersey; Anthony D'Esposito, New York; Eric Burlison, Missouri; John James, Michigan; Derrick Van Orden, Wisconsin; Brandon Williams, New York; Marc Molinaro, New York; Mike Collins, Georgia; Mike Ezell, Mississippi; John Duarte, California; Aaron Bean, Florida; Celeste Maloy, Utah (from December 6, 2023); Kevin Kiley, California (from April 10, 2024); Vince Fong, California (from June 3, 2024)	Rick Larsen, Washington, Ranking Member; Eleanor Holmes Norton, District of Columbia; Grace Napolitano, California; Steve Cohen, Tennessee; John Garamendi, California; Hank Johnson, Georgia; André Carson, Indiana; Dina Titus, Nevada; Jared Huffman, California; Julia Brownley, California; Frederica Wilson, Florida; Donald Payne Jr., New Jersey (until April 24, 2024); Mark DeSaulnier, California; Salud Carbajal, California; Greg Stanton, Arizona, Vice Ranking Member; Colin Allred, Texas; Sharice Davids, Kansas; Chuy García, Illinois; Chris Pappas, New Hampshire; Seth Moulton, Massachusetts; Jake Auchincloss, Massachusetts; Marilyn Strickland, Washington; Troy Carter, Louisiana; Pat Ryan, New York; Mary Peltola, Alaska; Rob Menendez, New Jersey; Val Hoyle, Oregon; Emilia Sykes, Ohio; Hillary Scholten, Michigan; Valerie Foushee, North Carolina

Resolutions electing members: H.Res. 14 (Chair), H.Res. 15 (Ranking Member), H.Res. 79 (D), H.Res. 80 (R), H.Res. 913 (R)

Subcommittees

Subcommittee	Chair	Ranking Member
Aviation	Garret Graves (R-LA)	Steve Cohen (D-TN)
Coast Guard and Maritime Transportation	Daniel Webster (R-FL)	Salud Carbajal (D-CA)
Economic Development, Public Buildings and Emergency Management	Scott Perry (R-PA)	Dina Titus (D-NV)
Highways and Transit	Rick Crawford (R-AR)	Eleanor Holmes Norton (D-DC)
Railroads, Pipelines, and Hazardous Materials	Troy Nehls (R-TX)	Donald Payne Jr. (D-NJ) (until April 24, 2024); Frederica Wilson (D-FL) (from May 7, 2024)
Water Resources and Environment	David Rouzer (R-NC)	Grace Napolitano (D-CA)

=== 117th Congress ===
Majority	Minority
Peter DeFazio, Oregon, Chair; Eleanor Holmes Norton, District of Columbia; Eddie Bernice Johnson, Texas; Rick Larsen, Washington; Grace Napolitano, California; Steve Cohen, Tennessee; Albio Sires, New Jersey; John Garamendi, California; Hank Johnson, Georgia; André Carson, Indiana; Dina Titus, Nevada; Sean Patrick Maloney, New York; Jared Huffman, California; Julia Brownley, California; Frederica Wilson, Florida; Donald Payne Jr., New Jersey; Alan Lowenthal, California; Mark DeSaulnier, California; Stephen Lynch, Massachusetts; Salud Carbajal, California; Anthony Brown, Maryland; Tom Malinowski, New Jersey; Greg Stanton, Arizona; Colin Allred, Texas; Sharice Davids, Kansas, Vice Chair; Chuy Garcia, Illinois; Antonio Delgado, New York (until May 25, 2022); Chris Pappas, New Hampshire; Conor Lamb, Pennsylvania; Seth Moulton, Massachusetts; Jake Auchincloss, Massachusetts; Carolyn Bourdeaux, Georgia; Kai Kahele, Hawaii; Marilyn Strickland, Washington; Nikema Williams, Georgia; Marie Newman, Illinois; Troy Carter, Louisiana (since May 12, 2021); Sheila Cherfilus-McCormick, Florida (since June 14, 2022)	Sam Graves, Missouri, Ranking Member; Don Young, Alaska (until March 18, 2022); Rick Crawford, Arkansas; Bob Gibbs, Ohio; Daniel Webster, Florida; Thomas Massie, Kentucky; Scott Perry, Pennsylvania; Rodney Davis, Illinois; John Katko, New York; Brian Babin, Texas; Garret Graves, Louisiana; David Rouzer, North Carolina; Mike Bost, Illinois; Randy Weber, Texas; Doug LaMalfa, California; Bruce Westerman, Arkansas; Brian Mast, Florida; Mike Gallagher, Wisconsin; Brian Fitzpatrick, Pennsylvania; Jenniffer González, Puerto Rico; Troy Balderson, Ohio; Pete Stauber, Minnesota; Tim Burchett, Tennessee; Dusty Johnson, South Dakota; Jeff Van Drew, New Jersey; Michael Guest, Mississippi; Troy Nehls, Texas; Nancy Mace, South Carolina; Nicole Malliotakis, New York; Beth Van Duyne, Texas; Carlos Giménez, Florida; Michelle Steel, California

Resolutions electing members: H.Res. 9 (Chair), H.Res. 10 (Ranking Member), H.Res. 62 (D), H.Res. 63 (R), H.Res. 384 (D), H.Res. 1173 (D)

Subcommittees

Subcommittee	Chair	Ranking Member
Aviation	Rick Larsen (D-WA)	Garret Graves (R-LA)
Coast Guard and Maritime Transportation	Salud Carbajal (D-CA)	Bob Gibbs (R-OH)
Economic Development, Public Buildings and Emergency Management	Dina Titus (D-NV)	Daniel Webster (R-FL)
Highways and Transit	Eleanor Holmes Norton (D-DC)	Rodney Davis (R-IL)
Railroads, Pipelines, and Hazardous Materials	Donald Payne Jr. (D-NJ)	Rick Crawford (R-AR)
Water Resources and Environment	Grace Napolitano (D-CA)	David Rouzer (R-NC)

=== 116th Congress ===
Majority	Minority
Peter DeFazio, Oregon, Chair; Eleanor Holmes Norton, District of Columbia; Eddie Bernice Johnson, Texas; Rick Larsen, Washington; Grace Napolitano, California; Daniel Lipinski, Illinois; Steve Cohen, Tennessee; Albio Sires, New Jersey; John Garamendi, California; Hank Johnson, Georgia; André Carson, Indiana; Dina Titus, Nevada; Sean Patrick Maloney, New York; Jared Huffman, California; Julia Brownley, California; Frederica Wilson, Florida; Donald Payne Jr., New Jersey; Alan Lowenthal, California; Mark DeSaulnier, California; Stacey Plaskett, U.S. Virgin Islands; Stephen Lynch, Massachusetts; Salud Carbajal, California, Vice Chair; Anthony Brown, Maryland; Adriano Espaillat, New York; Tom Malinowski, New Jersey; Greg Stanton, Arizona; Debbie Mucarsel-Powell, Florida; Lizzie Pannill Fletcher, Texas; Colin Allred, Texas; Sharice Davids, Kansas; Abby Finkenauer, Iowa; Chuy Garcia, Illinois; Antonio Delgado, New York; Chris Pappas, New Hampshire; Angie Craig, Minnesota; Harley Rouda, California; Conor Lamb, Pennsylvania (since November 19, 2019)	Sam Graves, Missouri, Ranking Member; Don Young, Alaska; Rick Crawford, Arkansas; Bob Gibbs, Ohio; Daniel Webster, Florida; Thomas Massie, Kentucky; Mark Meadows, North Carolina; Scott Perry, Pennsylvania; Rodney Davis, Illinois; Rob Woodall, Georgia; John Katko, New York; Brian Babin, Texas; Garret Graves, Louisiana; David Rouzer, North Carolina; Mike Bost, Illinois; Randy Weber, Texas; Doug LaMalfa, California; Bruce Westerman, Arkansas; Lloyd Smucker, Pennsylvania; Paul Mitchell, Michigan; Brian Mast, Florida; Mike Gallagher, Wisconsin; Gary Palmer, Alabama; Brian Fitzpatrick, Pennsylvania; Jenniffer González, Puerto Rico; Troy Balderson, Ohio; Ross Spano, Florida; Pete Stauber, Minnesota; Carol Miller, West Virginia; Greg Pence, Indiana; Mike Garcia, California (since July 1, 2020)

Sources: H.Res. 24 (Chair), H.Res. 25 (Ranking Member), H.Res. 57 (D), H.Res. 68 (R), H.Res. 712 (D), H.Res. 1037 (R)

Subcommittees

Subcommittee	Chair	Ranking Member
Aviation	Rick Larsen (D-WA)	Garret Graves (R-LA)
Coast Guard and Maritime Transportation	Sean Patrick Maloney (D-CA)	Bob Gibbs (R-OH)
Economic Development, Public Buildings and Emergency Management	Dina Titus (D-NV)	Mark Meadows (R-NC)
Highways and Transit	Eleanor Holmes Norton (D-DC)	Rodney Davis (R-IL)
Railroads, Pipelines, and Hazardous Materials	Daniel Lipinski (D-IL)	Rick Crawford (R-AR)
Water Resources and Environment	Grace Napolitano (D-CA)	Bruce Westerman (R-AR)

=== 115th Congress ===
Majority	Minority
Bill Shuster, Pennsylvania, Chair; Don Young, Alaska; Jimmy Duncan, Tennessee, Vice Chair; Frank LoBiondo, New Jersey; Sam Graves, Missouri; Duncan D. Hunter, California; Rick Crawford, Arkansas; Lou Barletta, Pennsylvania; Bob Gibbs, Ohio; Daniel Webster, Florida; Jeff Denham, California; Thomas Massie, Kentucky; Mark Meadows, North Carolina; Scott Perry, Pennsylvania; Rodney L. Davis, Illinois; Mark Sanford, South Carolina; Rob Woodall, Georgia; Todd Rokita, Indiana; John Katko, New York; Brian Babin, Texas; Garret Graves, Louisiana; Barbara Comstock, Virginia; David Rouzer, North Carolina; Mike Bost, Illinois; Randy Weber, Texas; Doug LaMalfa, California; Bruce Westerman, Arkansas; Lloyd Smucker, Pennsylvania; Paul Mitchell, Michigan; John Faso, New York; Drew Ferguson, Georgia; Brian Mast, Florida; Jason Lewis, Minnesota	Peter DeFazio, Oregon, Ranking Member; Eleanor Holmes Norton, District of Columbia; Eddie Bernice Johnson, Texas; Elijah Cummings, Maryland; Rick Larsen, Washington; Mike Capuano, Massachusetts; Grace Napolitano, California; Daniel Lipinski, Illinois; Steve Cohen, Tennessee; Albio Sires, New Jersey; John Garamendi, California; Hank Johnson, Georgia; André Carson, Indiana; Rick Nolan, Minnesota; Dina Titus, Nevada; Sean Patrick Maloney, New York; Elizabeth Esty, Connecticut, Vice Ranking Member; Lois Frankel, Florida; Cheri Bustos, Illinois; Jared Huffman, California; Julia Brownley, California; Frederica Wilson, Florida; Donald Payne Jr., New Jersey; Alan Lowenthal, California; Brenda Lawrence, Michigan; Mark DeSaulnier, California; Stacey Plaskett, U.S. Virgin Islands

Sources: H.Res. 6 (Chair), H.Res. 45 (D), H.Res. 51 (R)

=== 114th Congress ===
Majority	Minority
Bill Shuster, Pennsylvania, Chair; Don Young, Alaska; Jimmy Duncan, Tennessee; John Mica, Florida; Frank LoBiondo, New Jersey; Sam Graves, Missouri; Candice Miller, Michigan; Duncan D. Hunter, California; Rick Crawford, Arkansas; Lou Barletta, Pennsylvania; Blake Farenthold, Texas; Bob Gibbs, Ohio; Richard L. Hanna, New York; Daniel Webster, Florida; Jeff Denham, California; Reid Ribble, Wisconsin; Thomas Massie, Kentucky; Mark Meadows, North Carolina; Scott Perry, Pennsylvania; Rodney L. Davis, Illinois; Mark Sanford, South Carolina; Rob Woodall, Georgia; Todd Rokita, Indiana; John Katko, New York; Brian Babin, Texas; Cresent Hardy, Nevada; Ryan Costello, Pennsylvania; Garret Graves, Louisiana; Mimi Walters, California; Barbara Comstock, Virginia; Carlos Curbelo, Florida; David Rouzer, North Carolina; Lee Zeldin, New York; Mike Bost, Illinois	Peter DeFazio, Oregon, Ranking Member; Eleanor Holmes Norton, District of Columbia; Jerrold Nadler, New York; Corrine Brown, Florida; Eddie Bernice Johnson, Texas; Elijah Cummings, Maryland; Rick Larsen, Washington; Mike Capuano, Massachusetts; Grace Napolitano, California; Daniel Lipinski, Illinois; Steve Cohen, Tennessee; Albio Sires, New Jersey; Donna Edwards, Maryland; John Garamendi, California; Andre Carson, Indiana; Janice Hahn, California; Rick Nolan, Minnesota; Ann Kirkpatrick, Arizona; Dina Titus, Nevada; Sean Patrick Maloney, New York; Elizabeth Esty, Connecticut; Lois Frankel, Florida; Cheri Bustos, Illinois; Jared Huffman, California; Julia Brownley, California

=== 112th Congress ===
Majority	Minority
John Mica, Florida, Chair; Don Young, Alaska; Tom Petri, Wisconsin; Howard Coble, North Carolina; Jimmy Duncan, Tennessee; Frank LoBiondo, New Jersey; Gary Miller, California; Timothy V. Johnson, Illinois; Sam Graves, Missouri; Bill Shuster, Pennsylvania; Shelley Moore Capito, West Virginia; Jean Schmidt, Ohio; Candice Miller, Michigan; Duncan D. Hunter, California; Andrew P. Harris, Maryland; Rick Crawford, Arkansas; Jaime Herrera Beutler, Washington; Frank Guinta, New Hampshire; Randy Hultgren, Illinois; Lou Barletta, Pennsylvania; Chip Cravaack, Minnesota; Blake Farenthold, Texas; Larry Bucshon, Indiana; Billy Long, Missouri; Bob Gibbs, Ohio; Pat Meehan, Pennsylvania; Richard L. Hanna, New York; Jeff Landry, Louisiana; Steve Southerland, Florida; Jeff Denham, California; James Lankford, Oklahoma; Reid Ribble, Wisconsin; Chuck Fleischmann, Tennessee	Nick Rahall, West Virginia, Ranking Member; Peter DeFazio, Oregon; Jerry Costello, Illinois; Eleanor Holmes Norton, District of Columbia; Jerrold Nadler, New York; Corrine Brown, Florida; Bob Filner, California; Eddie Bernice Johnson, Texas; Elijah Cummings, Maryland; Leonard Boswell, Iowa; Tim Holden, Pennsylvania; Rick Larsen, Washington; Mike Capuano, Massachusetts; Tim Bishop, New York; Mike Michaud, Maine; Russ Carnahan, Missouri; Grace Napolitano, California; Daniel Lipinski, Illinois; Mazie Hirono, Hawaii; Jason Altmire, Pennsylvania; Tim Walz, Minnesota; Heath Shuler, North Carolina; Steve Cohen, Tennessee; Laura Richardson, California; Albio Sires, New Jersey; Donna Edwards, Maryland

- Resolutions electing Republican members (H.Res. 6, H.Res. 33)
- Resolutions electing Democratic members (H.Res. 7, H.Res. 39)

== See also ==
- List of United States House of Representatives committees
