= U.S.–Japan Caucus =

Congressional Caucus in the United States

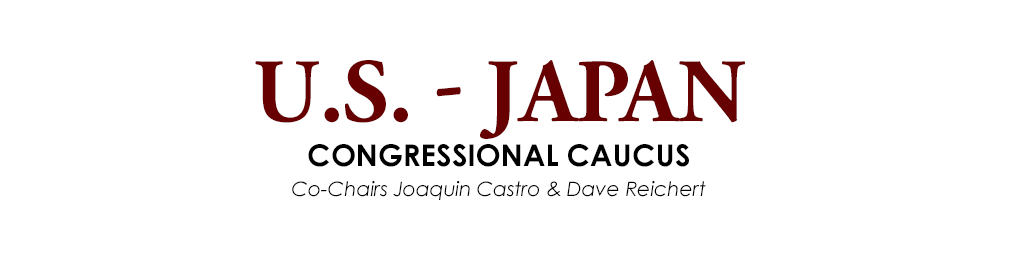
- Democratic Co-Chair: Joaquin Castro (TX-20)
- Republican Co-Chair: Adrian Smith (NE-3)
- Founders: Joaquin Castro (TX-20); Devin Nunes (CA-22)
- Founded: January 3, 2014
- Legalized: March 24, 2014
- Colors: Red
- Seats in the United States Senate: 0 / 100
- Seats in the House: 103 / 435

The U.S.–Japan Caucus is a bipartisan congressional member organization within the United States Congress made up of over 100 members of the United States House of Representatives who work to strengthen and maintain U.S.–Japanese relations.

== Mission and purpose ==
According to the caucus's website, its goal is to "...facilitate bilateral collaboration on matters of common interest between our two countries, including trade, foreign direct investment, regional stability, military cooperation, energy, technological development, and the environment. The caucus collaborates with other entities and stakeholders that share this same objective."

== History ==
In January 2014, Congressmen Joaquin Castro (D-TX) and Devin Nunes (R-CA) began inviting members of Congress from both parties to join a Congressional Member Organization based on the improvement of U.S.–Japanese relations.

The formation of the caucus was officially announced on March 24, 2014, during a live press conference. During the conference, Rep. Castro gave the following statement on behalf of the caucus:

I'm thrilled to help establish this bipartisan caucus and further strengthen the relationship between the U.S. and Japan on a range of issues including international economics, national security, and international development. As a Representative of San Antonio, it is especially important to continue to maintain and develop Texas’ strong economic and cultural ties with Japan. Not only is Kumamoto is San Antonio's sister city, but also Japan is the 4th largest contributor of foreign direct investment in Texas with over 30 business projects in the state. I look forward to working with my Congressional colleagues on both sides of the aisle to facilitate bilateral collaboration on issues of common interest and strategic importance between the two countries.

In January 2015, after Rep. Devin Nunes became the Chairman of the House Intelligence Committee, he stepped down from his role within the caucus as its Republican Co-Chair. Nunes was replaced by then Rep. Charles Boustany (LA-3). On March 23, 2016, Boustany stepped down as co-chair of the caucus. He was replaced by Rep. David Reichert (WA-8). Reichert, to date, is the current Republican Co-Chair.

== Membership ==
As of the 118th Congress, the U.S.–Japan Caucus has 69 members. Below the leadership caucus members are listed alphabetically.

=== Current members ===
- Rep. Joaquin Castro (TX-20)- co-chair
- Rep. Adrian Smith (NE-3)- co-chair
- Rep. Mark Amodei (NV-2)
- Rep. Andy Barr (KY-6)
- Rep. Ami Bera (CA-7)
- Rep. Jack Bergman (MI-1)
- Rep. Don Beyer (VA-8)
- Rep. Sanford Bishop (GA-2)
- Rep. Earl Blumenauer (OR-3)
- Rep. Salud Carbajal (CA-24)
- Rep. Buddy Carter (GA-1)
- Rep. Ed Case (HI-1)
- Rep. Steve Cohen (TN-9)
- Rep. Gerry Connolly (VA-11)
- Rep. Henry Cuellar (TX-28)
- Rep. Suzan DelBene (WA-1)
- Rep. Scott DesJarlais (TN-4)
- Rep. Jeff Duncan (SC-3)
- Rep. Tom Emmer (MN-6)
- Rep. Drew Ferguson (GA-3)
- Rep. Chuck Fleischmann (TN-3)
- Rep. Bill Foster (IL-11)
- Rep. Lois Frankel (FL-21)
- Rep. Mike Gallagher (WI-8)
- Rep. Ruben Gallego (AZ-3)
- Rep. Vicente Gonzalez (TX-34)
- Rep. Paul Gosar (AZ-4)
- Rep. Kay Granger (TX-12)
- Rep. Al Green (TX-9)
- Rep. Brett Guthrie (KY-2)
- Rep. J. French Hill (AR-2)
- Rep. Jim Himes (CT-4)
- Rep. Hakeem Jeffries (NY-8)
- Rep. Hank Johnson (GA-4)
- Rep. Jim Jordan (OH-4)
- Rep. Bill Keating (MA-9)
- Rep. Derek Kilmer (WA-6)
- Rep. Doug LaMalfa (CA-1)
- Rep. Doug Lamborn (CO-5)
- Rep. Rick Larsen (WA-2)
- Rep. Ted Lieu (CA-33)
- Rep. Barry Loudermilk (GA-11)
- Rep. Gregory Meeks (NY-5)
- Rep. Carol Miller (WV-3)
- Rep. John Moolenaar (MI-4)
- Rep. Seth Moulton (MA-6)
- Rep. Richard Neal (MA-1)
- Rep. Dan Newhouse (WA-4)
- Rep. Eleanor Holmes Norton (DC-At large)
- Rep. Scott Peters (CA-52)
- Rep. Mike Quigley (IL-5)
- Rep. Jaime Raskin (MD-8)
- Rep. Dutch Ruppersberger (MD-2)
- Rep. Gregorio Sablan (NMI-At large)
- Rep. David Schweikert (AZ-6)
- Rep. David Scott (GA-13)
- Rep. Mike Simpson (ID-2)
- Rep. Adam Smith (WA-9)
- Rep. Jason Smith (MO-8)
- Rep. Darren Soto (FL-9)
- Rep. Chris Stewart (UT-2)
- Rep. Mark Takano (CA-41)
- Rep. Mike Thompson (CA-4)
- Rep. Dina Titus (NV-1)
- Rep. Marc Veasey (TX-33)
- Rep. Randy Weber (TX-14)
- Rep. Bruce Westerman (AR-4)

=== Former members ===
- Rep. Jackie Speier (CA-14) -retired at end of 117th Congress
- Rep. Kathleen Rice (NY-4) -retired at end of 117th Congress
- Rep. Steven Palazzo (MS-4) - lost renomination in 2022
- Rep. Ed Perlmutter (CO-7) -retired at end of 117th Congress
- Rep. Billy Long (MO-7) - retired at end of 117th Congress
- Rep. Brenda Lawrence (MI-14) - retired at end of 117th Congress
- Rep. Ron Kind (WI-3) - retired at end of 117th Congress
- Rep. Eddie Bernice Johnson (TX-30) -retired at end of 117th Congress
- Rep. Jim Cooper (TN-5) - retired at end of 117th Congress due to redistricting
- Rep. Charlie Crist (FL-13) - retired at end of 117th Congress
- Rep. Anthony Brown (MD-4) - retired at end of 117th Congress
- Rep. Cynthia Lummis (WY-At large)- announced she would not seek re-election in 2016
- Rep. Randy Forbes (VA-4)- defeated in the 2016 Republican primary
- Rep. Brad Ashford (NE-2)- defeated in the 2016 general election
- Rep. Charles Boustany (LA-3)- gave up his seat to unsuccessfully run in the 2016 United States Senate election in Louisiana
- Rep. Janice Hahn (CA-44)- retired from Congress in 2016 to successfully run for the Los Angeles County Board of Supervisors
- Rep. Richard L. Hanna (NY-22)- announced he would not seek re-election in 2016
- Sen. Chris Van Hollen (D-MD)- retired from Congress in 2016 to successfully run for Maryland's open Senate seat
- Rep. Bill Pascrell (NJ-9) - died in 2024
- Sen. Todd Young (R-IN)- retired from Congress in 2016 to successfully run for Indiana's open Senate seat
- Rep. Ryan Zinke (MT-At large)- nominated by Donald Trump to be the 52nd United States Secretary of the Interior in 2017
- Rep. Charlie Dent (PA-15)- resigned from Congress in May 2018
- Rep. Diane Black (TN-6)- retired from Congress in 2018 to run unsuccessfully for Governor of Tennessee
- Rep. Madeleine Bordallo (Guam-At large) - defeated in the 2018 Democratic primary.
- Rep. Mike Capuano (MA-7)- defeated in the 2018 Democratic primary
- Rep. Carlos Curbelo (FL-26)- defeated in 2018 general election
- Rep. Jeff Denham (CA-10)- defeated in 2018 general election
- Rep. Jimmy Duncan (politician) (TN-2)- retired from Congress in 2018
- Rep. Gene Green (TX-29)- retired from Congress in 2018
- Rep. Gregg Harper (MS-3)-retired from Congress in 2018
- Rep. Tom MacArthur (NJ-3)- defeated in the 2018 general election
- Rep. Jared Polis (CO-2)- retired from Congress in 2018 to successfully run for Governor in Colorado
- Rep. Robert Pittenger (NC-9)- defeated in the 2018 Republican primary
- Rep. Tom Rooney (FL-17)- retired from Congress in 2018
- Rep. Dennis Ross (FL-15)- retired from Congress in 2018
- Rep. Niki Tsongas (MA-3)- retired from Congress in 2018
- Rep. Kevin Yoder (KS-3)- defeated in 2018 general election
- Rep. Tulsi Gabbard (HI-2) - retired from Congress in 2020 to unsuccessfully run for in the Democratic primary for the 2020 United States presidential election
- Rep. Ralph Abraham (LA-5)- announced he would not seek re-election in 2020
- Rep. Mark Meadows (NC-11)- resigned from Congress to become White House chief of staff
- Rep. Eliot Engel (NY-16)- defeated in the 2020 Democratic primary
- Rep. Denny Heck (WA-10)- retired from Congress in 2020 to run successfully for Lieutenant Governor in Washington State
- Rep. George Holding (NC-2)- retired from Congress in 2020 due to court-ordered redistricting
- Rep. Joe Kennedy (MA-4)- retired from Congress in 2020 to unsuccessfully challenge incumbent Ed Markey in the Democratic Primary for Senate in Massachusetts
- Rep. Doug Collins (GA-9)- retired from Congress in 2020 to unsuccessfully run in the United States Senate special election in Georgia
- Rep. Kenny Marchant (TX-24)- retired from Congress in 2020
- Rep. Jim Sensenbrenner (WI-5)- retired from Congress in 2020
- Rep. Pete Visclosky (IN-1)- retired from Congress in 2020
- Rep. Susan Davis (CA-53)- retired from Congress in 2020
- Rep. Alcee Hastings (FL-20)- died in April 2021
- Rep. Devin Nunes (CA-22)- resigned January 2022 to become Chief Executive Officer of the Trump Media & Technology Group (TMTG)
- Rep. Filemon Vela Jr. (TX-34)- resigned March 2022 to work at Akin Gump
- Rep. Jackie Walorski (IN-2)- killed in car crash along with two staffers in August 2022
- Rep. Sheila Jackson Lee (TX-18) - died in 2024
- Rep. Carolyn Maloney (NY-12)
- Rep. Pat Tiberi (OH-12)

== Political activity ==
Since the founding of the caucus, it and its members have repeatedly voiced their opinions on various issues surrounding Japanese foreign relations, as well as worked to pass legislation that would benefit U.S.–Japanese relations.

=== Visit to Japan ===
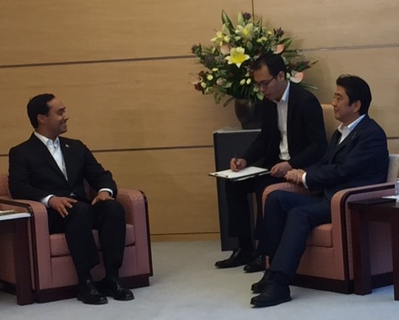
Rep. Joaquin Castro (left) with Japanese Prime Minister Shinzo Abe (right) and a translator

From August 23 to August 28, 2015, Rep. Joaquin Castro, then Co-Chair of the U.S.–Japan Caucus, visited Japan for five days as an official representative of the United States and the U.S.–Japan Caucus. While there, he met with various officials within the Japanese Government, including, Shinzo Abe (The Prime Minister of Japan), Caroline Kennedy (the then-U.S. Ambassador to Japan), Yoichi Miyazawa (Then Japanese Minister of Economy, Trade, and Industry), as well as the members of the Japanese-US Parliamentary Friendship League (the Japanese counterpart of the U.S.–Japan Caucus).

=== Japanese comfort women ===
On January 12, 2016, the U.S.–Japan Caucus came out in support of a historic agreement between Japan and South Korea surrounding the controversial issue of Japanese comfort women. The caucus released the following statement:

In reaching this historic agreement, the leaders of Japan and the Republic of Korea have shifted their gazes toward a future built on mutual respect. We are pleased to see two important allies of the United States take such a significant step forward. The resolution of this sensitive issue not only strengthens Japan and the Republic of Korea's bilateral relationship, it also positions the entire Asia-Pacific region for greater prosperity, peace, and stability. We commend Prime Minister Abe and President Park's leadership and resolve in addressing this matter. The progress they achieved will surely serve both nations well as they confront any number of serious challenges that may arise in today's unpredictable world.

=== November 2017 North Korean missile test ===
On November 28, 2017, North Korea launched a Hwasong-15 ballistic missile into the Sea of Japan, which landed near Japan's Exclusive Economic Zone. In response, the U.S.–Japan Caucus, consisting of members from both political parties, issued the following statement:

North Korea's pursuit of nuclear weapons and ballistic missiles threatens the United States and our Japanese and South Korean allies. Applying the necessary diplomatic pressure on North Korea to cease its weapons development will require a fully-staffed and well supported diplomatic corps that is empowered to carry out the tasks required of them, including through the appointment of leaders to be Ambassador to South Korea and other important positions within the State Department that remain vacant ten months into this Presidency.
