= Bruce Westerman =

American politician (born 1967)

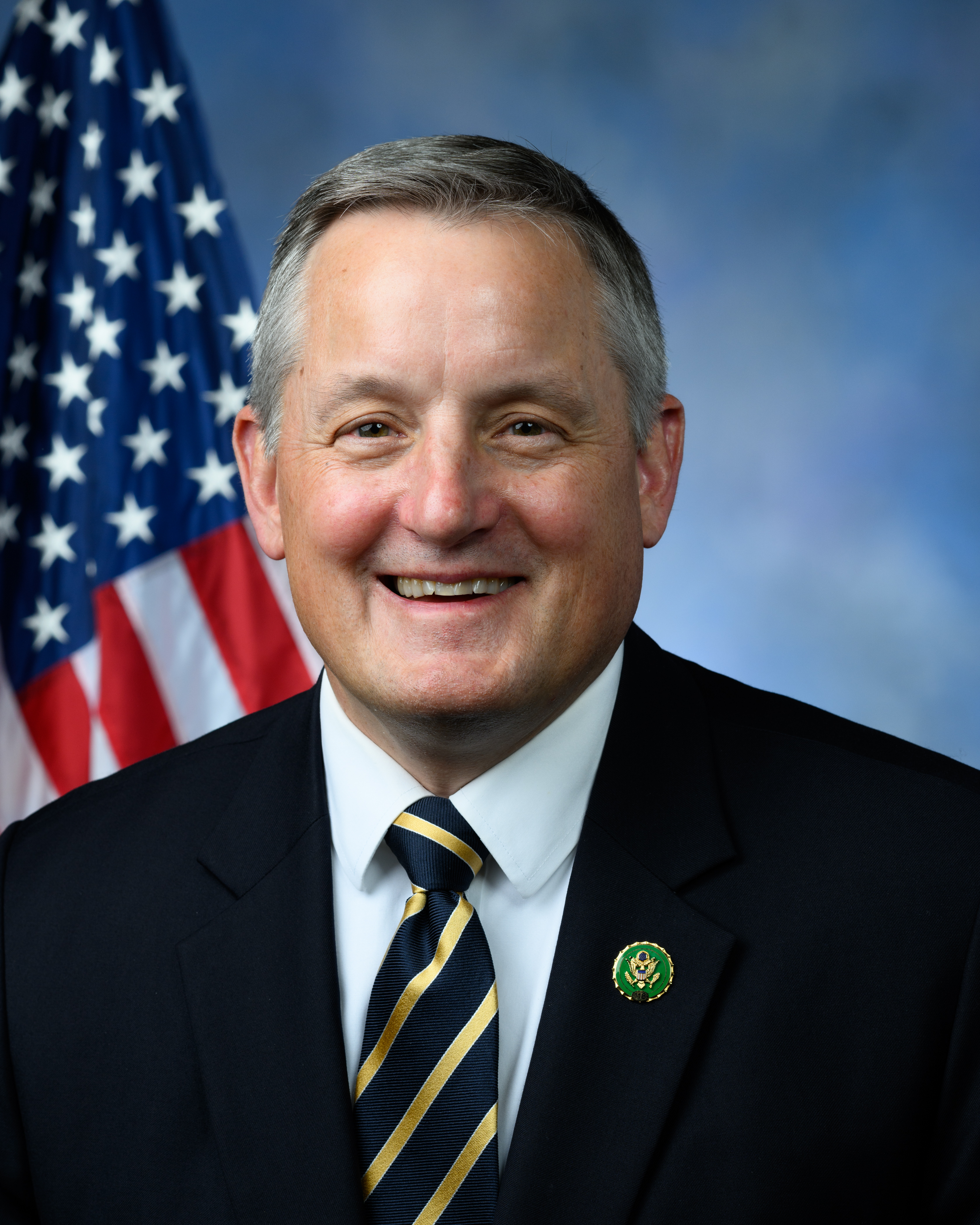
- Official portrait, 2023

Chair of the House Natural Resources Committee
- Incumbent
- Assumed office January 3, 2023
- Preceded by: Raúl Grijalva

Ranking Member of the House Natural Resources Committee
- In office January 3, 2021 – January 3, 2023
- Preceded by: Rob Bishop
- Succeeded by: Raúl Grijalva

Member of the U.S. House of Representatives from Arkansas's 4th district
- Incumbent
- Assumed office January 3, 2015
- Preceded by: Tom Cotton

Majority Leader of the Arkansas House of Representatives
- In office January 14, 2013 – January 3, 2015
- Preceded by: Johnnie Roebuck
- Succeeded by: Ken Bragg

Member of the Arkansas House of Representatives from the 22nd district
- In office January 14, 2013 – January 3, 2015
- Preceded by: Nate Bell
- Succeeded by: Mickey Gates

Member of the Arkansas House of Representatives from the 30th district
- In office January 11, 2011 – January 14, 2013
- Preceded by: Bill Sample
- Succeeded by: Charles Armstrong

Personal details
- Born: Bruce Eugene Westerman; November 18, 1967 (age 59) Hot Springs, Arkansas, U.S.
- Party: Republican
- Spouse: Sharon French
- Children: 4
- Education: University of Arkansas (BS); Yale University (MS)
- Website: House website Campaign website
- Westerman's voice Westerman supporting the Eastern Band of Cherokee Historic Lands Reacquisition Act. Recorded February 6, 2023

Bruce Eugene Westerman (born November 18, 1967) is an American forester and politician serving as the U.S. representative for Arkansas's 4th congressional district. Previously, he served as member and the majority leader of the Arkansas House of Representatives. He is a member of the Republican Party.

Westerman was first elected to Congress in 2014, succeeding Tom Cotton, who was elected to the elected to the U.S. Senate that year.

== Background ==
Westerman was raised in and resides in Hot Springs, Arkansas. He graduated as valedictorian of Fountain Lake High School in Hot Springs. He attended the University of Arkansas in Fayetteville, where he played college football for the Arkansas Razorbacks football team. He graduated with a Bachelor of Science in engineering in 1990 and subsequently received a Master of Science in forestry from Yale University.

Westerman worked as an engineer and forester before being elected to the Arkansas House in 2010. He was formerly employed as an engineer and forester by the Mid-South Engineering Company. He served as president of the Arkansas chapter of the American Society of Agricultural and Biological Engineering. He is also a former chair of the Arkansas Academy of Biological and Agricultural Engineers, and served on the Fountain Lake School District school board.

== Arkansas House of Representatives ==
=== Elections ===
Westerman ran for the Arkansas House of Representatives in 2010.

=== Tenure ===
Westerman served as the House Minority Leader in 2012 and House Majority Leader in 2013. He was the first Republican House Majority Leader in Arkansas since Reconstruction.

=== Committee assignments ===
- Revenue And Taxation Committee
  - Subcommittee on Sales, Use, Miscellaneous Taxes and Exemptions (chair)
- State Agencies And Governmental Affairs Committee
- Insurance and Commerce Committee

=== Caucus memberships ===
- Congressional Wildlife Refuge Caucus
- Rare Disease Caucus
- House BIOTech Caucus

== U.S. House of Representatives ==
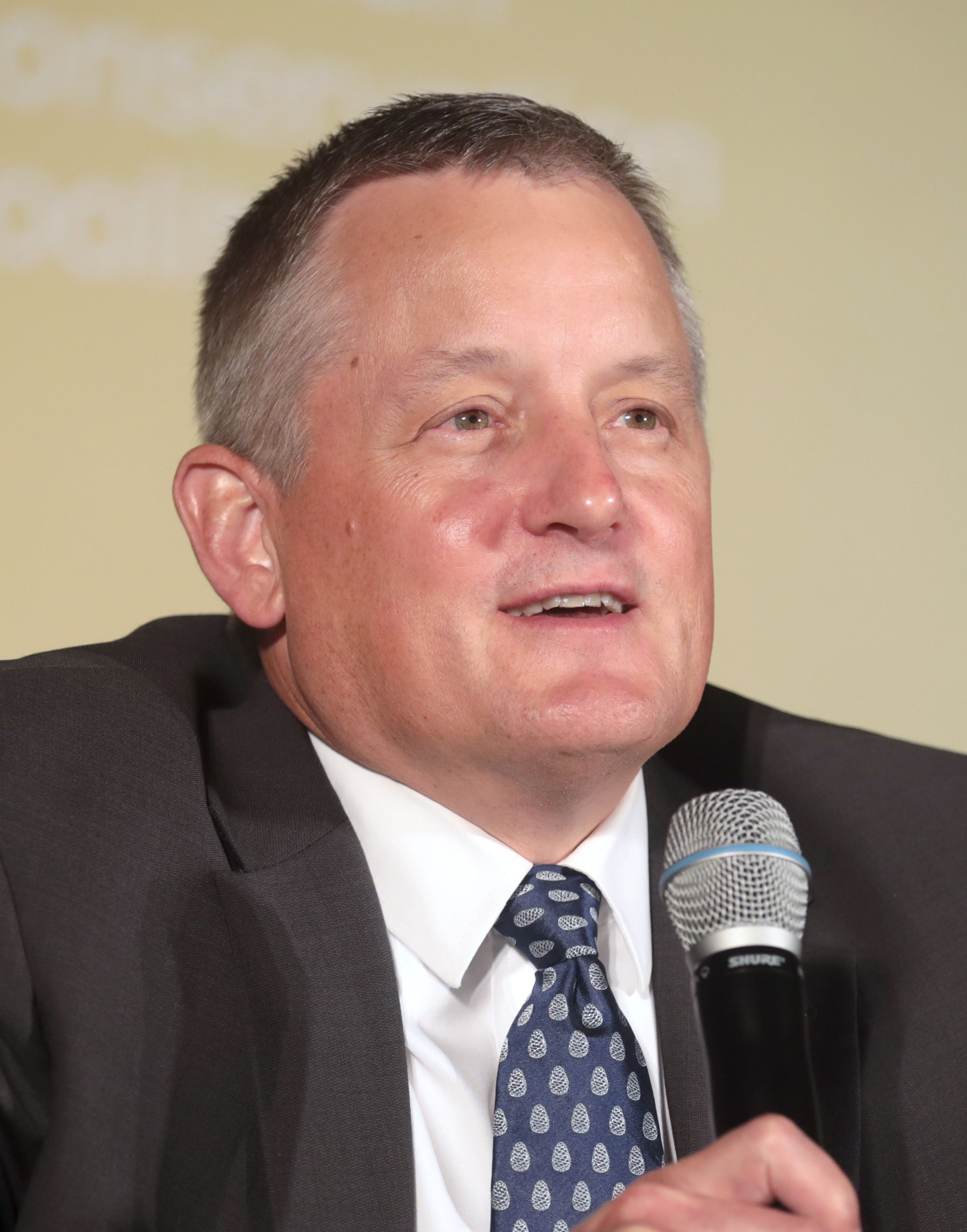
Westerman speaking at an event in June 2022

=== 2014 election ===
Westerman won the Republican primary on May 20, defeating Tommy Moll, 54%–46%. In November, he defeated Democratic nominee James Lee Witt, a former associate of U.S. President Bill Clinton, 54%-43%.

=== Tenure ===
In 2015, Westerman cosponsored a resolution to amend the US constitution to ban same-sex marriage.

On June 20, 2017, as the only certified forester in the House, Westerman introduced H.R.2936 - Resilient Federal Forests Act of 2017, providing for the culling of overgrown federally managed woods. After passing the House, it was introduced in the Senate on November 2, 2017, where it failed.

Westerman voted for the Tax Cuts and Jobs Act of 2017.

In December 2020, Westerman was one of 126 Republican members of the House of Representatives to sign an amicus brief in support of Texas v. Pennsylvania, a lawsuit filed at the United States Supreme Court contesting the results of the 2020 presidential election. The Supreme Court declined to hear the case on the basis that Texas lacked standing under Article III of the Constitution to challenge the results of an election held by another state.

Westerman voted to certify both Arizona's and Pennsylvania's results in the 2021 United States Electoral College vote count.

During the 2021 Capitol riot, Westerman, left behind in House minority leader Kevin McCarthy's office when he was evacuated by security, took a Civil War sword from a shattered display for protection and hid from rioters on a toilet.

As of October 2021, Westerman had voted in line with Joe Biden's stated position 8% of the time.

In the October 2023 Speaker of the United States House of Representatives election, Westerman received one vote for speaker from representative Pete Stauber of Minnesota.

=== Committee assignments ===
For the 118th Congress:

- Committee on Natural Resources (Chair)
  - As Chair of the committee, Rep. Westerman is entitled to sit as an ex officio member in all subcommittee meetings per the committee's rules.
- Committee on Transportation and Infrastructure
  - Subcommittee on Aviation
  - Subcommittee on Railroads, Pipelines, and Hazardous Materials
  - Subcommittee on Water Resources and Environment

=== Caucus memberships ===
- Congressional Sportsmen's Caucus
- Congressional Western Caucus
- Republican Study Committee
- Working Forests Caucus (co-chair, co-founder)
- Dyslexia Caucus (co-chair)
- U.S.-Japan Caucus
- Congressional Coalition on Adoption

== Political positions ==
=== Abortion ===
Westerman believes that "Life is a right. Abortion is not." He supported the June 2022 overturning of Roe v. Wade.

=== Environment ===
On April 19, 2021, he introduced the Trillion Trees Act, which planned to plant a trillion trees, but the bill was criticized by scientists and environmental groups. Westerman has a 4% lifetime score from the League of Conservation Voters.

In January 2025, Westerman introduced the Fix Our Forests Act alongside Representative Scott Peters of California. The bill aims to improve forest management for wildfire risk reduction.

=== Gun law ===
Westerman has received consistent "A" grades from the National Rifle Association Political Victory Fund (NRA-PVF) for his pro-gun rights legislative voting record. He voted against the Enhanced Background Checks Act in 2021.

== Electoral history ==
Arkansas House of Representatives 30th District Election, 2010
Party	Candidate	Votes	%
Republican	Bruce Westerman	n/a	100.00

Arkansas House of Representatives 22nd District Election, 2012
Party	Candidate	Votes	%
Republican	Bruce Westerman	n/a	100.00

Arkansas 4th Congressional District Republican Primary Election, 2014
Party	Candidate	Votes	%
Republican	Bruce Westerman	18,719	54.45
Republican	Tommy Moll	15,659	45.55
Total votes		34,378	100.00

Arkansas 4th Congressional District Election, 2014
Party	Candidate	Votes	%
Republican	Bruce Westerman	110,789	53.75
Democratic	James Lee Witt	87,742	42.57
Libertarian	Ken Hamilton	7,598	3.69
Write-in		2	0.0
Total votes		206,131	100.00
Republican hold			

Arkansas 4th Congressional District Election, 2016
Party	Candidate	Votes	%
Republican	Bruce Westerman (incumbent)	182,885	74.9
Libertarian	Kerry Hicks	61,274	25.1
Total votes		244,159	100.00
Republican hold			

Arkansas 4th Congressional District Republican Primary Election, 2018
Party	Candidate	Votes	%
Republican	Bruce Westerman (incumbent)	40,201	79.8
Republican	Randy Caldwell	10,151	20.2
Total votes		50,352	100.00

Arkansas 4th Congressional District Election, 2018
Party	Candidate	Votes	%
Republican	Bruce Westerman (incumbent)	136,740	66.7
Democratic	Hayden Shamel	63,984	31.2
Libertarian	Tom Canada	3,952	1.9
Write-in		216	0.1
Total votes		204,892	100.00
Republican hold			

Arkansas 4th Congressional District Election, 2020
Party	Candidate	Votes	%
Republican	Bruce Westerman (incumbent)	191,617	69.7
Democratic	William Hanson	75,750	27.5
Libertarian	Frank Gilbert	7,668	2.8
Total votes		275,035	100.00
Republican hold			

Arkansas 4th Congressional District Election, 2022
Party	Candidate	Votes	%
Republican	Bruce Westerman (incumbent)	153,850	71.0
Democratic	John White	56,745	26.1
Libertarian	Gregory Maxwell	6,101	2.8
Total votes		216,696	100.00
Republican hold			

Arkansas's 4th Congressional District Election, 2024
Party	Candidate	Votes	%
Republican	Bruce Westerman (incumbent)	197,046	72.9
Democratic	Risie Howard	73,207	27.1
Total votes		270,253	100%
Republican hold			

Arkansas House of Representatives
Preceded by Johnnie Roebuck	Majority Leader of the Arkansas House of Representatives; 2013–2015	Succeeded by Ken Bragg
U.S. House of Representatives
Preceded by Tom Cotton	Member of the U.S. House of Representatives from Arkansas's 4th congressional district 2015–present	Incumbent
Preceded by Raúl Grijalva	Chair of the House Natural Resources Committee; 2023–present	Incumbent
U.S. order of precedence (ceremonial)
Preceded by Bonnie Watson Coleman	United States representatives by seniority 147th	Succeeded by Trent Kelly
