= United States House Transportation Subcommittee on Economic Development, Public Buildings and Emergency Management =

Subcommittee of the United States House of Representatives

Subcommittee of Committee on Transportation and Infrastructure
- Active United States House of Representatives; 119th Congress

Leadership
- Chair: Scott Perry (R)
- Ranking Member: Greg Stanton (D)

Structure
- Seats: 15 (14 currently filled) 7/8 7/7
- Political parties: Majority (7): Republican (7); Minority (7): Democratic (7)

Meeting place
- 2165, Rayburn House Office Building; Washington, D.C. 20515

Phone number
- (202)-225-9446

The Subcommittee on Economic Development, Public Buildings and Emergency Management is a subcommittee within the House Transportation and Infrastructure Committee.

== Jurisdiction ==
The Subcommittee oversees many federal real estate and economic development programs. The real estate management arm of the Subcommittee, for example, oversees the Public Buildings Service, which is responsible for the infrastructure and use of the Capitol Grounds, the Smithsonian Institution, and the John F. Kennedy Center for the Performing Arts. The Subcommittee also manages the Federal Emergency Management Agency (FEMA), and certain aspects of the Department of Homeland Security.

== Members, 119th Congress ==
Majority	Minority
Scott Perry, Chair; Mike Ezell, Mississippi; Kevin Kiley, California (until March 18, 2026); Tom Barrett, Michigan; Rob Bresnahan, Pennsylvania; Kimberlyn King-Hinds, Northern Mariana Islands; Mike Kennedy, Utah; Bob Onder, Missouri, Vice Chair	Greg Stanton, Arizona, Ranking Member; Eleanor Holmes Norton, District of Columbia; Kristen McDonald Rivet, Michigan; Shomari Figures, Alabama; John Garamendi, California; Dina Titus, Nevada; Laura Friedman, California, Vice Ranking Member
Ex officio
Sam Graves, Missouri	Rick Larsen, Washington

== Historical membership rosters ==
=== 115th Congress ===
Majority	Minority
Lou Barletta, Pennsylvania, Chairman; Rick Crawford, Arkansas; Barbara Comstock, Virginia; Mike Bost, Illinois; Lloyd Smucker, Pennsylvania; John Faso, New York; Drew Ferguson, Georgia, Vice Chair; Brian Mast, Florida	Hank Johnson, Georgia, Ranking Member; Eleanor Holmes Norton, District of Columbia; Albio Sires, New Jersey; Grace Napolitano, California; Mike Capuano, Massachusetts
Ex officio
Bill Shuster, Pennsylvania	Peter DeFazio, Oregon

=== 116th Congress ===
Majority	Minority
Dina Titus, Nevada, Chair; Debbie Mucarsel-Powell, Florida; Sharice Davids, Kansas; Eleanor Holmes Norton, District of Columbia; Hank Johnson, Georgia; John Garamendi, California; Anthony Brown, Maryland; Lizzie Fletcher, Texas	Mark Meadows, North Carolina, Ranking Member; Gary Palmer, Alabama; Jenniffer González, Puerto Rico; Carol Miller, West Virginia; Greg Pence, Indiana
Ex officio
Peter DeFazio, Oregon	Sam Graves, Missouri

=== 117th Congress ===
Majority	Minority
Dina Titus, Nevada, Chair; Eleanor Holmes Norton, District of Columbia; Sharice Davids, Kansas; Chris Pappas, New Hampshire, Vice Chair; Grace Napolitano, California; John Garamendi, California; Troy Carter, Louisiana	Daniel Webster, Florida, Ranking Member; Thomas Massie, Kentucky; Jenniffer González, Puerto Rico; Michael Guest, Mississippi; Beth Van Duyne, Texas; Carlos A. Giménez, Florida
Ex officio
Peter DeFazio, Oregon	Sam Graves, Missouri

=== 118th Congress ===
Majority	Minority
Scott Perry, Chair; Garret Graves, Louisiana; Jenniffer González Colón, Puerto Rico; Lori Chavez-DeRemer, Oregon, Vice Chair; Anthony D'Esposito, New York; Derrick Van Orden, Wisconsin; Mike Ezell, Mississippi; Celeste Maloy, Utah	Dina Titus, Nevada, Ranking Member; Eleanor Holmes Norton, District of Columbia; Sharice Davids, Kansas; Troy Carter, Louisiana; Grace Napolitano, California; John Garamendi, California; Jared Huffman, California
Ex officio
Sam Graves, Missouri	Rick Larsen, Washington
