= Carlos Curbelo =

American politician (born 1980)

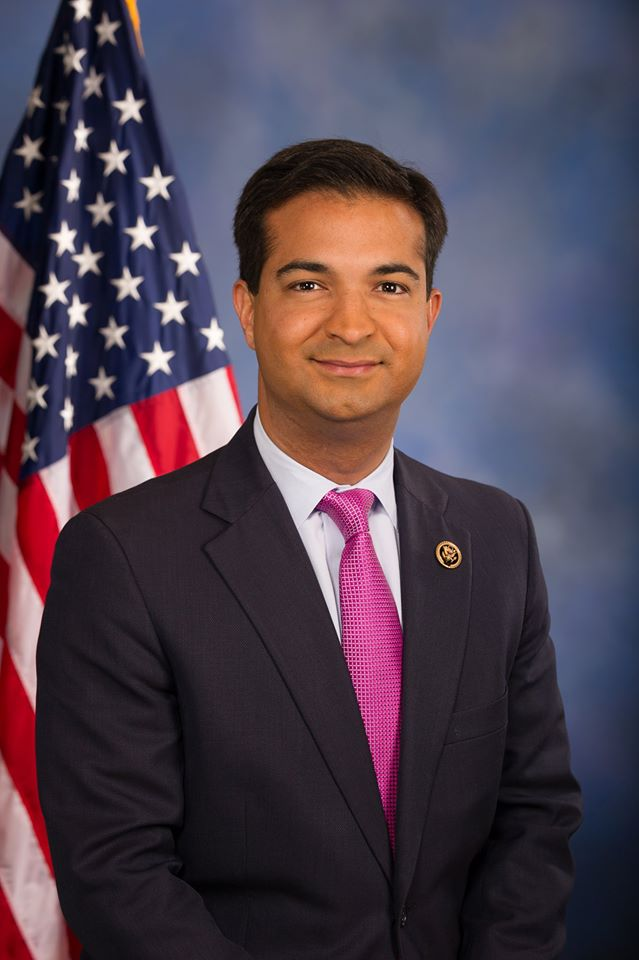

Member of the U.S. House of Representatives from Florida's 26th district
- In office January 3, 2015 – January 3, 2019
- Preceded by: Joe García
- Succeeded by: Debbie Mucarsel-Powell

Member of the Miami-Dade County Public Schools Board from the 7th district
- In office 2010–2015
- Preceded by: Ana Rivas Logan
- Succeeded by: Lubby Navarro

Personal details
- Born: Carlos Luis Curbelo; March 1, 1980 (age 45) Miami, Florida, U.S.
- Party: Republican
- Spouse: Cecilia Lowell (m. 2006)
- Children: 2
- Education: University of Miami (BA, MPA)

Carlos Luis Curbelo (born March 1, 1980) is an American politician who served as the U.S. representative for Florida's 26th congressional district from 2015 to 2019. In 2018, he was narrowly defeated for re-election by Democrat Debbie Mucarsel-Powell. He is a member of the Republican Party. Prior to his election to the U.S. House, he served on the Dade County School Board.

== Early life and education ==
Curbelo was born in Miami, the son of Cuban exiles in Florida. He attended Belen Jesuit Preparatory School. He attended the University of Miami, where he earned bachelor's and master's degrees in public administration.

== Career ==
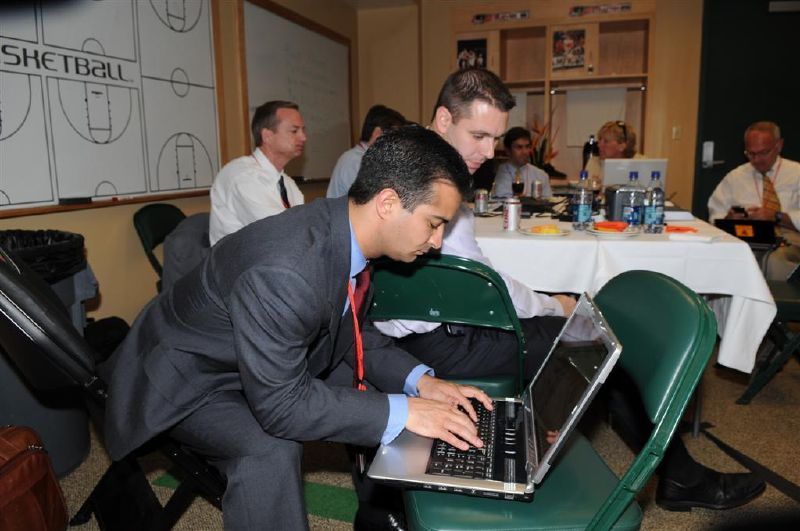
Curbelo in 2007

Curbelo previously served on the Miami-Dade County Public Schools board from 2010 to 2015. He won the seat vacated by Ana Rivas Logan. Curbelo represented the 7th district. He was succeeded by Lubby Navarro on the school board. Curbelo is the founder of Capitol Gains, a government and public relations firm.

He is also a former state director for former U.S. senator George LeMieux of Florida.

== U.S. House of Representatives ==
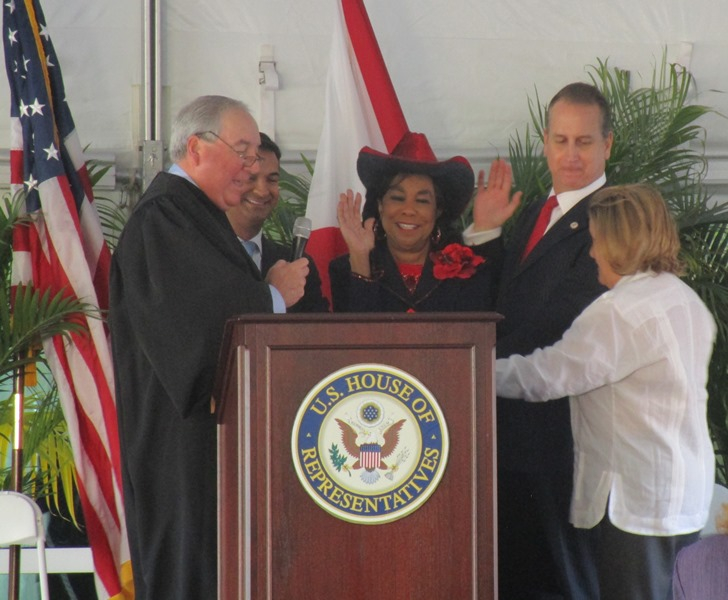
Chief Judge Kevin Michael Moore, swearing in members of Congress: Carlos Curbelo (R), Frederica Wilson (D), Mario Díaz-Balart (R), and Ileana Ros-Lehtinen (R). (February 2015)

=== Elections ===
==== 2014 ====
In the 2014 election, Curbelo defeated incumbent Joe Garcia of the Democratic Party by 52 to 48 percent.

==== 2016 ====
Curbelo ran for re-election in 2016. He was unopposed in the Republican primary. In the general election, Curbelo defeated Garcia in a rematch. Curbelo received 53% of the vote.

==== 2018 ====
Curbelo was challenged by Democrat Debbie Mucarsel-Powell in one of the most hotly contested House races in Florida. Curbelo was significantly outspent during the campaign, as national Democrats eyed a pick-up opportunity in a district that had been won by Hillary Clinton in the 2016 presidential election. The Democratic Congressional Campaign Committee spent more money (nearly $7.2 million) in the district than in any other race in 2018. House Majority PAC, a Democratic super PAC, spent about $2.5 million in the race.

In the November 2018 general election, Mucarsel-Powell defeated Curbelo with 50.9% of the vote to Curbelo's 49.1%.

Reflecting on his election loss, Curbelo said the Republican Party "has to understand that if we're going to have a small government, free enterprise party in America, that Trumpism isn't the future for such a party."

=== Committee assignments ===
In the 115th Congress, Curbelo sat on the following committee and subcommittees:

- Committee on Ways and Means
  - Subcommittee on Human Resources
  - Subcommittee on Oversight

=== Tenure ===
Curbelo has a reputation as a moderate Republican. According to McClatchy, "Curbelo has broken ranks with his party to take lonely stands on high-profile topics ranging from abortion and women’s health to climate change, the environment, immigration and government spending." Curbelo was ranked the fourth most bipartisan member of the U.S. House of Representatives during first session of the 115th United States Congress by the Bipartisan Index, created by The Lugar Center and the McCourt School of Public Policy to assess congressional bipartisanship.

In November 2017, Curbelo made a bid to join the Congressional Hispanic Caucus, which is made up of 30 Democratic members of Congress. After Curbelo made a presentation to the group, caucus membership took a vote and a majority refused to admit him to its membership. Members of the caucus cited Curbelo's vote in favor of repealing Obamacare as a reason to deny him membership, and that Curbelo had not yet signed on as a cosponsor of the DREAM Act, though he said he would vote in favor of any proposal to help undocumented youth who came to the U.S. as children. In January 2018, the Congressional Hispanic Caucus announced that its political arm would support Democrat Debbie Mucarsel-Powell in her 2018 bid for Curbelo's seat. In an editorial, the Miami Herald criticized the caucus's decision to exclude Curbelo from its ranks, writing that "not letting Curbelo join the caucus remains a short-sighted, spiteful move" and that "The caucus should make clear that it's an exclusive club for Democrats, and that Republicans need apply—even if they're Hispanic."

As of September 2018, Curbelo had voted with his party 86.3% of the time in the 115th United States Congress.

Curbelo was a member of the United States Congressional International Conservation Caucus, the Republican Main Street Partnership the Climate Solutions Caucus, and the U.S.-Japan Caucus. Along with Ileana Ros-Lehtinen, he was one of two Republican members of the Congressional LGBT Equality Caucus who served in the 115th United States Congress.

=== Legislation sponsored ===
The following is an incomplete list of legislation that Curbelo sponsored:

- Affordable College Textbook Act (H.R. 3840; 115th Congress)
- Market Choice Act (H.R. 6463; 115th Congress)

== Political positions ==
=== Vote Smart issue positions ===
Vote Smart, a non-profit, non-partisan research organization that collects and distributes information on candidates for public office in the United States, "researched presidential and congressional candidates' public records to determine candidates' likely responses on certain key issues." According to Vote Smart's 2016 analysis, Curbelo generally supports anti-abortion legislation, opposes an income tax increase, opposes mandatory minimum sentences for non-violent drug offenders, supports lowering taxes as a means of promoting economic growth, opposes requiring states to adopt federal education standards, supports building the Keystone Pipeline, supports government funding for the development of renewable energy, supports the federal regulation of greenhouse gas emissions, supports repealing the Affordable Care Act, opposes requiring immigrants who are unlawfully present to return to their country of origin before they are eligible for citizenship, supports same-sex marriage, supports increased American intervention in Iraq and Syria beyond air support, and supports allowing individuals to divert a portion of their Social Security taxes into personal retirement accounts.

=== Environment ===
In February 2016, Curbelo and Democratic representative Ted Deutch created the bipartisan Climate Solutions Caucus in the House to "explore policy options that address the impacts, causes, and challenges of our changing climate."

In 2016, Curbelo had the second highest rating of House Republicans on the annual scorecard of the League of Conservation Voters. The Miami Herald wrote that Curbelo has "attempted to position himself as the national voice for Republicans who are concerned about climate change," describing him as "one of the few GOP voices speaking out against Donald Trump's decision to withdraw from the Paris Climate Agreement and his desire to dismantle the Environmental Protection Agency." Curbelo described climate change as a "local issue" that is causing flooding in his congressional district. Speaking about his efforts to convince his fellow Republicans about the threats posed by climate change, Curbelo told the New York Times "I know we have the truth on our side. So I'm confident that we'll win—eventually."

In December 2017, Curbelo and eleven other House Republicans signed a letter to Mitch McConnell urging the U.S. Senate "to pass a tax bill without oil-drilling concessions in the Arctic National Wildlife Refuge." Curbelo voted in favor of the final bill, which "includes a provision, introduced by Sen. Lisa Murkowski (R-Alaska), that would require Interior Secretary Ryan Zinke to approve at least two lease sales for drilling—each covering no less than 400,000 acres—in the refuge's coastal plain area."

In April 2018, Curbelo called for the resignation of Environmental Protection Agency Administrator Scott Pruitt, saying Pruitt's "corruption scandals are an embarrassment" and that Pruitt's "conduct is grossly disrespectful to American taxpayers."

In July 2018, Curbelo became the first Republican in nearly a decade to propose legislation on enacting a carbon tax to address the climate change (H.R. 6463; 115th Congress). As part of the proposal, existing taxes on gasoline and diesel fuels would be repealed, and taxes would be introduced on carbon dioxide emissions that starts at $24/ton of CO2e in 2020. According to the Columbia University SIPA Center for Global Energy Policy, Curbelo's legislation would reduce net greenhouse gas emissions by 27–32 percent reductions by 2025 and 30–40 percent reductions by 2030 (compared to 2005 levels). The legislation was also estimated to increase annual federal government revenues by $57 billion–$72 billion in 2020 and $63 billion–$106 billion in 2030. National macroeconomic outcomes were estimated to decline modestly, with losses between 0.1 and 0.2 percent of GDP in the 2020s. Other Republicans disavowed the legislation, with the Republican-led House passing a nonbinding measure in July 2018 describing the legislation as "detrimental".

For his efforts Curbelo in December 2018 was called "ridiculous. That guy is a pretend environmentalist" by Tom Steyer.

=== Healthcare ===
Speaking about the Affordable Care Act ("Obamacare"), Curbelo said: "I clearly do not support the law and think it is bad policy. ... However I prefer to use the word 'replace' or 'substitute' Obamacare because to just say 'repeal' implies that there is no need for health care reform. But yes, if we replace or substitute Obamacare, that means it would no longer exist."

On May 3, 2017, Curbelo tweeted that "I just reiterated to @HouseGOP leaders that #AHCA in its current form fails to sufficiently protect Americans with pre-existing conditions." On May 4, 2017, he voted to repeal the Patient Protection and Affordable Care Act and pass the American Health Care Act (AHCA). Explaining his vote, Curbelo said the AHCA was "not perfect, but that it was important for him to be a part of negotiations" and that the vote "is just a step in the legislative process for this bill—not the end of it."

=== Donald Trump ===
In March 2016, Curbelo said he would not vote for Donald Trump in the 2016 presidential election, calling it "a moral decision" rather than a political decision. He did not attend the 2016 Republican National Convention. In October 2016, speaking about the upcoming presidential election, he said: "I'm not supporting any of the two major candidates. I'm as disappointed with this election as most Americans are."

In February 2017, while serving on the Ways and Means Committee, he voted against a measure that would have led to a request of the Treasury Department for Trump's tax returns. He then voted against a resolution that would have directed the House to request 10 years of Trump's tax returns, which would then have been reviewed by the House Ways and Means Committee in a closed session.

Quartz included Curbelo on a list of Republicans opposing Trump's 2017 executive order to impose a temporary ban on entry to the U.S. of people from seven Muslim-majority countries. Curbelo said at the time: "I expect that these executive orders are in fact temporary and that once the Administration strengthens the vetting process, we can continue our tradition of welcoming those who are persecuted, in an orderly manner and without any kind of religious test." He said the executive orders "were hastily issued & need a lot of work."

In May 2017, President Donald Trump was accused of having pressured fired FBI director James Comey with the intent to end an FBI investigation into former National Security Advisor Michael Flynn. Flynn had resigned after 24 days in his post when information surfaced that he had misled the FBI and Vice President Mike Pence about the nature and content of his communications with Russian Ambassador to the U.S. Sergey Kislyak. Curbelo publicly stated that the allegations, if proven true, merited impeachment, as did Michigan Republican congressman Justin Amash. On December 1, 2017, Flynn pleaded guilty in federal court to a single felony count of "willfully and knowingly" making "false, fictitious and fraudulent statements" to the FBI.

Curbelo supported President Trump's decision to recognize Jerusalem as Israel's capital. He stated: "Jerusalem is without question the capital of Israel and I commend the President's decision to recognize it as such."

In September 2018, FiveThirtyEight found that Curbelo had voted in line with President Trump 82% of the time, and was the sixth-most partisan Trump supporter in the House when compared to his district's voting patterns.

=== Guns ===
The Brady Campaign, a gun control advocacy group, labeled Curbelo an "NRA lap dog" for his support of the Second Amendment.

In 2017, Curbelo introduced a bill to ban bump stocks in the wake of the 2017 Las Vegas shooting.

Appearing on ABC's "This Week" on February 18, 2018, Curbelo called on Republican congressional leaders to introduce gun-control measures.

=== Tax reform ===
Curbelo voted in favor of the Tax Cuts and Jobs Act of 2017. The Miami New Times projected that Curbelo's wife, who owns a pass-through LLC, would financially benefit from the TCJA's pass-through deduction enabling such companies to deduct a portion of their profits on taxes. He says the bill will "make American families more prosperous."

=== LGBT rights ===
Curbelo supports same-sex marriage. Upon the landmark Supreme Court ruling Obergefell v. Hodges, Curbelo stated "I applaud the Supreme Court's ruling, and send my sincerest congratulations to all those who will finally enjoy the same legal rights as their peers."

=== Immigration ===
Curbelo is "an outspoken proponent of immigration reform." On July 23, 2015, he voted against legislation penalizing sanctuary cities. In November 2017, he said he would oppose any appropriations bill to fund the government past December 31 unless Congress passed permanent protections for recipients of Deferred Action for Childhood Arrivals (DACA), which currently impacts nearly 700,000 people and which President Trump rescinded in September 2017. Curbelo has pushed for a permanent version of DACA and is a co-sponsor of a bill on the topic developed with the bipartisan Problem Solvers Caucus. In December 2017, Curbelo, who was leading talks with Democrats on immigration overhaul, criticized leaders of the Problem Solvers Caucus for withholding details of a potential bipartisan compromise on immigration policy. He introduced "a slightly more conservative version of the DREAM Act" but said that he would vote for the DREAM Act or more liberal proposals if they ever came up for a vote. He filed the Recognizing America's Children Act (RAC) and said he would "support any bill that has a chance of putting DACA protections into law." In April 2018, he became a co-sponsor of the DREAM Act.

On July 6, 2018, Curbelo was denied entry by the Department of Health and Human Services into a government facility housing immigrant minors separated from their parents at the Mexican border. He had made arrangements with HHS two weeks earlier for the visit, but the night before the planned visit was told he would not be permitted to enter the facility.

=== Abortion ===
Curbelo voted against defunding Planned Parenthood. He also voted against repealing a District of Columbia law that protects employees from employer retaliation when they have abortions, use birth control, or make other reproductive choices.

=== Keystone pipeline ===
Curbelo voted for the Keystone pipeline.

=== Charter schools ===
He has voted to increase private school vouchers.

=== Iran deal ===
Curbelo voted against the Iran nuclear deal.

== Electoral history ==
Florida's 26th congressional district, 2014
Party	Candidate	Votes	%
Republican	Carlos Curbelo	83,031	51.5
Democratic	Joe García (incumbent)	78,306	48.5
Total votes		161,337	100.0
Republican gain from Democratic			

Florida’s 26th congressional district, 2016
Party	Candidate	Votes	%
Republican	Carlos Curbelo (incumbent)	148,547	52.9
Democratic	Joe Garcia	115,493	41.2
Independent	José Peixoto	16,502	5.9
Total votes		280,542	100.0
Republican hold			

Florida's 26th congressional district, 2018
Party	Candidate	Votes	%
Democratic	Debbie Mucarsel-Powell	119,797	50.9
Republican	Carlos Curbelo (incumbent)	115,678	49.1
Total votes		235,475	100.0
Democratic gain from Republican			

== Personal life ==
Curbelo married Cecilia Lowell, sister of former Marlins third baseman Mike Lowell, in 2006 and resides in Kendall, Florida.

He was diagnosed with whooping cough in August 2015. He was vaccinated as a child but did not receive the recommended booster shots as an adult. At the time of his diagnosis he said: "I want to use this opportunity to remind parents to vaccinate their children against this dangerous infection. Adults should be aware that booster shots are necessary in order to maintain the vaccine's effectiveness."

== See also ==
- List of Hispanic and Latino Americans in the United States Congress

U.S. House of Representatives
Preceded by Joe García	Member of the U.S. House of Representatives from Florida's 26th congressional district 2015–2019	Succeeded by Debbie Mucarsel-Powell
U.S. order of precedence (ceremonial)
Preceded by Patrick Murphy as Former U.S. Representative	Order of precedence of the United States as Former U.S. Representative	Succeeded by Francis Rooney as Former U.S. Representative
