= Garret Graves =

American politician (born 1972)

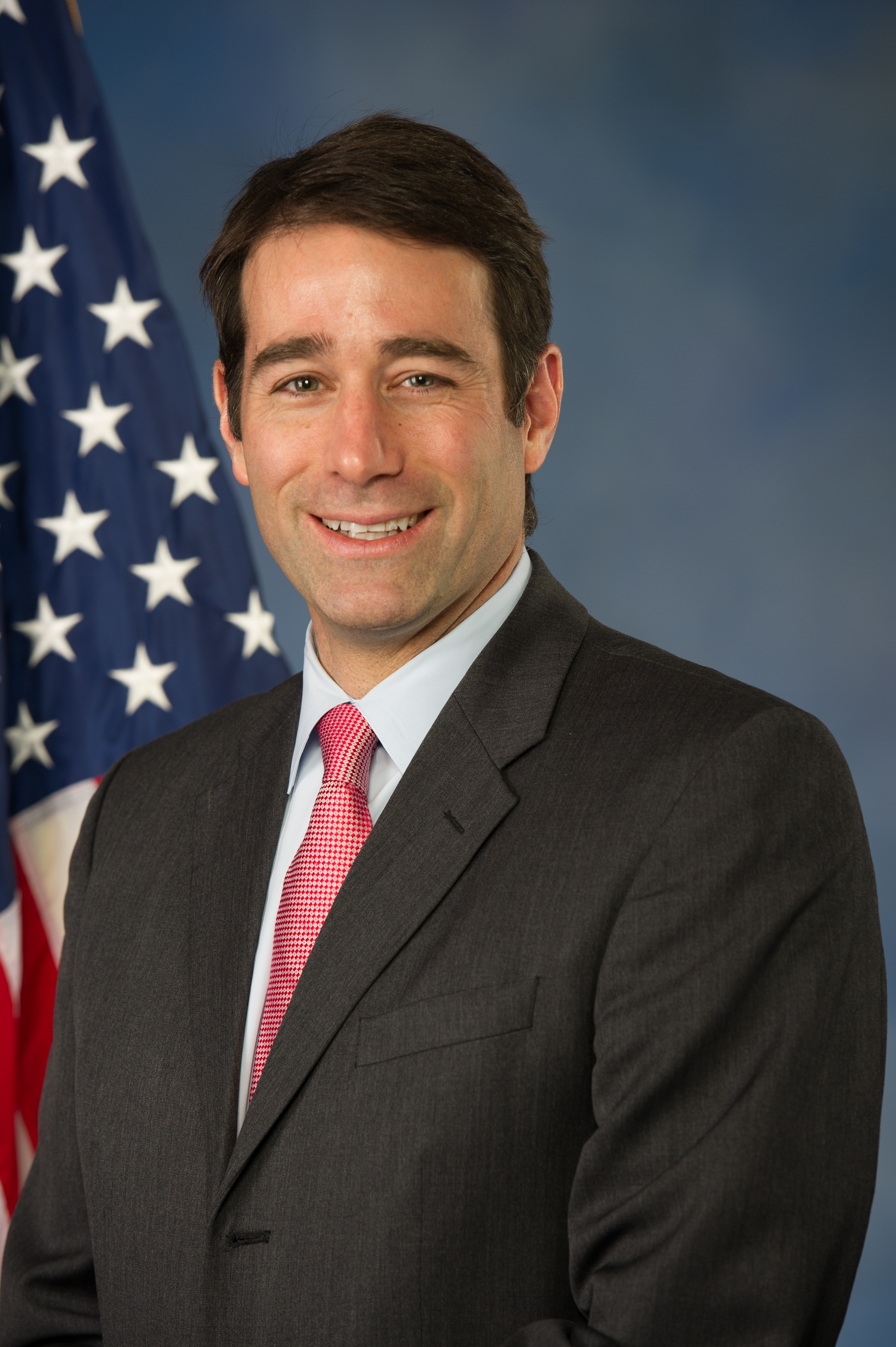
- Official portrait, 2015

Ranking Member of the House Climate Crisis Committee
- In office January 3, 2019 – January 3, 2023
- Preceded by: Position established
- Succeeded by: Position abolished

Member of the U.S. House of Representatives from Louisiana's 6th district
- In office January 3, 2015 – January 3, 2025
- Preceded by: Bill Cassidy
- Succeeded by: Cleo Fields

Personal details
- Born: Garret Neal Graves; January 31, 1972 (age 54) Baton Rouge, Louisiana, U.S.
- Party: Republican
- Spouse: Carissa Vanderleest
- Children: 3
- Education: University of Alabama (attended); Louisiana Tech University (attended); American University (attended)
- Graves's voice Graves honoring Rep. Don Young's legacy. Recorded March 29, 2022

Garret Neal Graves (born January 31, 1972) is an American politician who served as the United States representative for Louisiana's 6th congressional district from 2015 to 2025. He is a member of the Republican Party. After redistricting dismantled his district, he declined to run for re-election in 2024.

== Early life and education ==
Garret Graves was born on January 31, 1972, in Baton Rouge, Louisiana, to John and Cynthia (née Sliman) Graves. He is of partial Lebanese descent. Graves graduated from Baton Rouge's Catholic High School in 1990. He then attended the University of Alabama, Louisiana Tech, and American University.

== Career ==
Graves served as an aide for nine years to former U.S. Representative Billy Tauzin of Louisiana's 3rd congressional district. He was also a legislative aide to the U.S. House Committee on Energy and Commerce, which Tauzin chaired. In 2005, he became an aide for the United States Senate Committee on Commerce, Science and Transportation, working under Republican U.S. Senator David Vitter. He was the staff director for the United States Senate's Subcommittee on Climate Change and Impacts. He also worked for Democratic former U.S. senator John Breaux, a protégé of Edwin Edwards and Vitter's predecessor in the Senate. He served as a chief legislative aide to the U.S. Senate Committee on Environment and Public Works.

In 2008, Governor Bobby Jindal appointed Graves to chair the Louisiana Coastal Protection and Restoration Authority. As chair, he negotiated on behalf of the state with BP over the Deepwater Horizon oil spill until resigning on February 17, 2014.

In the spring of 2026 after serving in Congress, Graves served as a Fellow at the USC Center for the Political Future. There, he led a study group that discussed overcoming political polarization.

== U.S. House of Representatives ==
=== Elections ===
In March 2014, Graves announced his intention to run in the 2014 election to the United States House of Representatives for Louisiana's 6th congressional district; incumbent Republican Bill Cassidy successfully challenged incumbent Democratic U.S. senator Mary Landrieu.

In the 2014 nonpartisan blanket primary, Edwin Edwards finished in first place with 30% of the vote; Graves was the runner-up with 27%. Graves and Edwards advanced to the December 6 runoff election. In the runoff, Graves received 139,209 votes (62.4%) to Edwards's 83,781 (37.6%).

In the nonpartisan blanket primary held in conjunction with the national elections on November 6, 2018, Graves handily won his third term in the U.S. House, having led a four-candidate field with 186,524 votes (69%). Democrat Justin Dewitt trailed with 55,078 votes (21%). Two other candidates, Democrat "Andie" Saizan and Independent David Lance Graham, received the remaining 3%.

In November 2023, the Fifth Circuit Court of Appeals ruled in Robinson v. Ardoin that Louisiana must redistrict its electoral maps due to gerrymandering, which has unfairly diluted the representation of the state's African American population. In Robinson v. Callais, which has been appealed to the US Supreme Court, civil rights groups have alleged that the Louisiana State Legislature's proposed maps were still gerrymandered with electoral districts redrawn to unseat Graves, who is a political rival of incumbent Louisiana Governor Jeff Landry.

=== Tenure ===
In April 2017, Graves became engaged in a public dispute with Louisiana governor John Bel Edwards about the disbursement of federal assistance for Louisiana's 2016 flooding victims. Graves, who had been mentioned as a potential challenger to Edwards in the 2019 gubernatorial election, said that he was "focused on flood recovery ... none of the governor's talk is helping flood victims." Edwards attributed the delay in disbursement of the funds, which began on April 10, to the state's financial shortfall, which prevented the quick retaining of a disaster management firm. Edwards's executive counsel, Matthew Block, explained that the state had no money in 2016 to pay the contractor. Edwards projected a $440 million budget deficit for the fiscal year that began on July 1, 2017.

On January 6, 2021, Graves voted to object to the results of the 2020 election in Pennsylvania.

In January 2023 following the Republican takeover of the House of Representatives, Graves was a key ally of Kevin McCarthy in helping him be elected speaker of the House. McCarthy then gave him a leadership post: coordinating strategy among the five factions or "Five Families" within the Republican caucus. However, once McCarthy was ousted, Graves lost a lot of power and influence, culminating in retirement when it became clear the new district would be demographically unfavorable and he could not run in adjacent districts.

Graves was tapped to lead the Republican side in negotiations over the 2023 United States debt-ceiling crisis. Counselor to the president Steve Ricchetti, Office of Management and Budget Director Shalanda Young, and legislative affairs director Louisa Terrell were tapped to lead the Democratic side.

As a "parting gift" to the 118th Congress, Graves united with also-retiring Abigail Spanberger to complete a discharge petition to force through a Social Security bill, a move that antagonized the Conference leadership.

=== Committee assignments ===
Graves served on the following committees:

- Committee on Transportation and Infrastructure
  - Subcommittee on Aviation (Chair)
  - Subcommittee on Economic Development, Public Buildings and Emergency Management
- Committee on Natural Resources
  - Subcommittee on Energy and Mineral Resources
  - Subcommittee on Water, Wildlife and Fisheries

=== Caucus memberships ===
- Republican Study Committee
- Congressional Western Caucus
- United States Congressional International Conservation Caucus
- Congressional Coalition on Adoption
- Congressional Caucus on Turkey and Turkish Americans
- Congressional Taiwan Caucus
- Rare Disease Caucus

== Political positions ==
Graves voted to support Israel following the 2023 Hamas attack on Israel.

== Personal life ==
Graves resides in his native Baton Rouge. His wife is Carissa Vanderleest. He is Catholic.

== See also ==
- List of Arab and Middle-Eastern Americans in the United States Congress

U.S. House of Representatives
Preceded by Bill Cassidy	Member of the U.S. House of Representatives from Louisiana's 6th congressional district 2015–2025	Succeeded by Cleo Fields
New office	Ranking Member of the House Climate Crisis Committee; 2019–2023	Position abolished
Party political offices
Vacant Title last held by Greg Walden; 2013 as Chair of House Republican Leadership	Chair of the House Republican Elected Leadership Committee; 2023	Vacant Title next held by Elise Stefanik; 2025 as Chair of House Republican Leadership
U.S. order of precedence (ceremonial)
Preceded by Cedric Richmond as Former U.S. Representative	Order of precedence of the United States as Former U.S. Representative	Succeeded by John P. Hiler as Former U.S. Representative
