= Ohio State University Agricultural Technical Institute =

Public two-year college in Wooster, Ohio, US

Coordinates: 40.774887°N 81.924405°W

The Ohio State University ATI
- Type: Public satellite campus
- Established: 1969; 57 years ago
- Parent institution: Ohio State University
- President: Walter E. Carter Jr.
- Students: 464 (fall 2023)
- Location: Wooster, Ohio, United States
- Colors: Scarlet & gray
- Nickname: Buckeyes
- Website: ati.osu.edu

The Ohio State University Agricultural Technical Institute (Ohio State ATI) is a satellite campus of Ohio State University in Wooster, Ohio. It grants associate degrees from the university's College of Food, Agricultural, and Environmental Sciences. The institute practices open admissions. The curriculum includes general and basic studies that are applied and technical courses, and a paid industry internship. Ohio State ATI is the largest institution of its kind in the U.S., enrolling approximately 500 students and offering 24 programs of study. Ohio State ATI is part of the College of Food, Agricultural, and Environmental Sciences and on the college's Wooster campus.

Ohio State ATI awarded the most associate degrees in agricultural and related sciences in the nation among two-year institutions in 2011–2012.

== Academics ==
Ohio State ATI offers Certificates of Competency, Associate of Applied Science, and Associate of Science degrees.
