= 2024 United States House of Representatives elections in Mississippi =

- November 5, 2024

All 4 Mississippi seats to the United States House of Representatives
	Majority party	Minority party
Party	Republican	Democratic
Last election	3	1
Seats won	3	1
Seat change	Steady	Steady
Popular vote	812,799	350,353
Percentage	69.88%	30.12%
Swing	▲5.70%	▼5.20%

Republican
50–60%
60–70%
70–80%
80–90%
>90%
Democratic
50–60%
60–70%
70–80%
80–90%

The 2024 United States House of Representatives elections in Mississippi were held on November 5, 2024, to elect the four U.S. representatives from the State of Mississippi, one each of the state's four congressional districts. The elections coincided with the 2024 U.S. presidential election, as well as other elections to the House of Representatives, elections to the United States Senate, and various state and local elections. The primary elections took place on March 12, 2024.

== Overview ==
=== Statewide ===
Party	Candi- dates	Votes		Seats		
Party	Candi- dates	No.	%	No.	+/–	%
Republican Party	4	812,799	69.88%	3	Steady	75%
Democratic Party	3	350,353	30.12%	1	Steady	25%
Total	7	1,163,152	100%	4	Steady	100%

Popular vote
Republican	69.88%
Democratic	30.12%

House seats
Republican	75.00%
Democratic	25.00%

=== District ===
District	Republican		Democratic		Total		Result
District	Votes	%	Votes	%	Votes	%	Result
District 1	223,589	69.81%	96,697	30.19%	320,286	100.0%	Republican hold
District 2	108,956	37.98%	177,885	62.02%	286,841	100.0%	Democratic hold
District 3	265,159	100.00%	0	0.00%	265,159	100.0%	Republican hold
District 4	215,095	73.95%	75,771	26.05%	290,866	100.0%	Republican hold
Total	812,799	69.88%	350,353	30.12%	1,163,152	100.0%	

== District 1 ==
2024 Mississippi's 1st congressional district
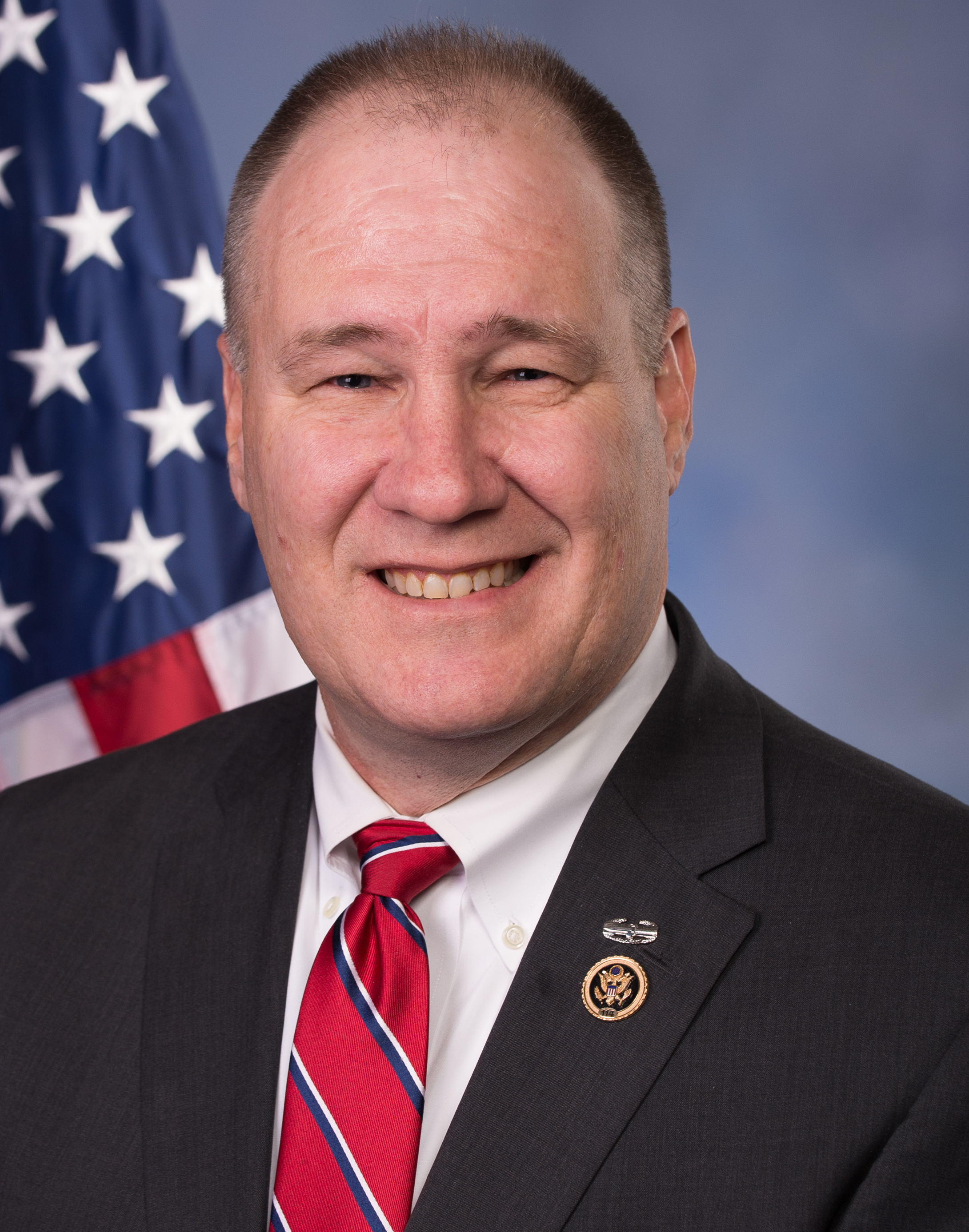

Nominee	Trent Kelly	Dianne Black
Party	Republican	Democratic
Popular vote	223,589	96,697
Percentage	69.8%	30.2%
- Kelly: 50–60% 60–70% 70–80% 80–90% >90% Black: 50–60% 60–70% 70–80% 80–90% >90%
U.S. Representative before election
Trent Kelly
Republican
Elected U.S. Representative
Trent Kelly
Republican

The 1st district takes in the northeastern area of the state, including Columbus, Oxford, Southaven, and Tupelo. The incumbent is Republican Trent Kelly, who was re-elected with 73.0% of the vote in 2022.

=== Republican primary ===
==== Candidates ====
===== Nominee =====
- Trent Kelly, incumbent U.S. representative

==== Endorsements ====
Trent Kelly

Organizations

- AIPAC
- Pro-Israel America(Post-primary)

==== Fundraising ====
Campaign finance reports as of February 21, 2024
Candidate	Raised	Spent	Cash on hand
Trent Kelly (R)	$648,681	$553,877	$420,515
Source: Federal Election Commission

=== Democratic primary ===
==== Candidates ====
===== Nominee =====
- Dianne Black, hair salon owner and nominee for this district in 2022

==== Eliminated in primary ====
- Bronco Williams, teacher

==== Results ====
Democratic primary results
Party	Candidate	Votes	%
Democratic	Dianne Black	12,147	85.0
Democratic	Bronco Williams	2,138	15.0
Total votes		14,285	100.0

=== General election ===
==== Predictions ====
Source	Ranking	As of
The Cook Political Report	Solid R	July 28, 2023
Inside Elections	Solid R	July 28, 2023
Sabato's Crystal Ball	Safe R	June 8, 2023
Elections Daily	Safe R	June 8, 2023
CNalysis	Solid R	November 16, 2023

==== Results ====
2024 Mississippi's 1st congressional district election
Party	Candidate	Votes	%
Republican	Trent Kelly (incumbent)	223,589	69.8
Democratic	Dianne Black	96,697	30.2
Total votes		320,286	100.0
Republican hold			

==== By county ====
County	Trent Kelly Republican		Dianne Black Democratic		Margin		Total
County	#	%	#	%	#	%	Total
Alcorn	12,674	85.16%	2,208	14.84%	10,466	70.33%	14,882
Benton	2,494	65.84%	1,294	34.16%	1,200	31.68%	3,788
Calhoun	4,472	75.24%	1,472	24.76%	3,000	50.47%	5,944
Chickasaw	4,150	58.07%	2,997	41.93%	1,153	16.13%	7,147
Choctaw	2,909	76.09%	914	23.91%	1,995	52.18%	3,823
Clay	4,228	46.54%	4,857	53.46%	-629	-6.92%	9,085
DeSoto	48,761	62.65%	29,065	37.35%	19,696	25.31%	77,826
Itawamba	9,576	90.83%	967	9.17%	8,609	81.66%	10,543
Lafayette	14,785	63.67%	8,435	36.33%	6,350	27.35%	23,220
Lee	25,193	71.99%	9,801	28.01%	15,392	43.98%	34,994
Lowndes	13,499	55.83%	10,681	44.17%	2,818	11.65%	24,180
Marshall	7,958	54.16%	6,736	45.84%	1,222	8.32%	14,694
Monroe	11,059	69.37%	4,884	30.63%	6,175	38.73%	15,943
Oktibbeha (part)	1,073	78.04%	302	21.96%	771	56.07%	1,375
Pontotoc	11,914	85.29%	2,054	14.71%	9,860	70.59%	13,968
Prentiss	8,729	84.74%	1,572	15.26%	7,157	69.48%	10,301
Tate	9,206	72.37%	3,514	27.63%	5,692	44.75%	12,720
Tippah	8,001	84.15%	1,507	15.85%	6,494	68.30%	9,508
Tishomingo	8,007	89.87%	903	10.13%	7,104	79.73%	8,910
Union	10,646	86.13%	1,714	13.87%	8,932	72.27%	12,360
Webster	4,255	83.84%	820	16.16%	3,435	67.68%	5,075
Totals	223,589	69.81%	96,697	30.19%	126,892	39.62%	320,286

== District 2 ==
2024 Mississippi's 2nd congressional district
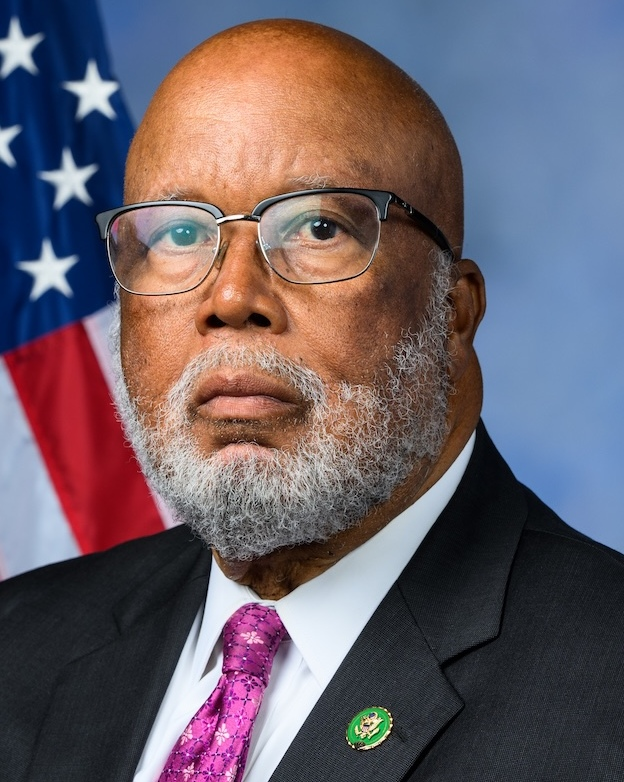

Nominee	Bennie Thompson	Ron Eller
Party	Democratic	Republican
Popular vote	177,885	108,956
Percentage	62.02%	37.98%
- Thompson: 50–60% 60–70% 70–80% 80–90% >90% Eller: 50–60% 60–70% 70–80% 80–90% >90% Tie: 50%
U.S. Representative before election
Bennie Thompson
Democratic
Elected U.S. Representative
Bennie Thompson
Democratic

The 2nd district encompasses the Mississippi Delta, taking in most of Jackson, the riverfront cities of Greenville, Natchez and Vicksburg, and the interior market cities of Clarksdale, Greenwood and Clinton. The incumbent is Democrat Bennie Thompson, who was re-elected with 60.1% of the vote in 2022.

=== Democratic primary ===
==== Candidates ====
===== Nominee =====
- Bennie Thompson, incumbent U.S. Representative

==== Fundraising ====
Campaign finance reports as of February 21, 2024
Candidate	Raised	Spent	Cash on hand
Bennie Thompson (D)	$513,919	$545,873	$1,698,954
Source: Federal Election Commission

=== Republican primary ===
==== Candidates ====
===== Nominee =====
- Ron Eller, physician assistant and candidate for this district in 2022

==== Eliminated in runoff ====
- Andrew Smith, businessman

===== Eliminated in primary =====
- Taylor Turcotte, regional sales manager

==== Fundraising ====
Campaign finance reports as of February 21, 2024
Candidate	Raised	Spent	Cash on hand
Ron Eller (R)	$1,355	$2,129	$45
Source: Federal Election Commission

==== Results ====
Neither of the candidates won more than 50% of the vote, so the two top candidates, Eller and Smith, advanced to a runoff that will be held on April 2. Eller won 16 counties and portions of Madison and Hinds counties, performing best in Warren County, while Smith won 12 counties, predominantly in the northern part of the district.

Results by county: Eller–60–70% Eller–50–60% Eller–40–50% Eller–30–40% Smith–40–50% Smith–50–60%

Republican primary results
Party	Candidate	Votes	%
Republican	Ron Eller	14,991	46.6
Republican	Andrew Smith	11,493	35.7
Republican	Taylor Turcotte	5,675	17.6
Total votes		32,159	100.0

Republican primary runoff results
Party	Candidate	Votes	%
Republican	Ron Eller	4,837	76.8
Republican	Andrew Smith	1,459	23.2
Total votes		6,296	100.0

=== General election ===
==== Predictions ====
Source	Ranking	As of
The Cook Political Report	Solid D	July 28, 2023
Inside Elections	Solid D	July 28, 2023
Sabato's Crystal Ball	Safe D	June 8, 2023
Elections Daily	Safe D	June 8, 2023
CNalysis	Solid D	November 16, 2023

==== Results ====
2024 Mississippi's 2nd congressional district election
Party	Candidate	Votes	%
Democratic	Bennie Thompson (incumbent)	177,885	62.02
Republican	Ron Eller	108,956	37.98
Total votes		286,841	100.00
Democratic hold			

==== By county ====
County	Bennie Thompson Democratic		Ron Eller Republican		Margin		Total
County	#	%	#	%	#	%	Total
Adams	6,947	58.52%	4,924	41.48%	2,023	17.04%	11,871
Amite	2,411	35.33%	4,414	64.67%	-2,003	-29.35%	6,825
Attala	3,131	40.66%	4,570	59.34%	-1,439	-18.69%	7,701
Bolivar	6,683	64.04%	3,752	35.96%	2,931	28.09%	10,435
Carroll	1,579	30.39%	3,617	69.61%	-2,038	-39.22%	5,196
Claiborne	3,082	85.52%	522	14.48%	2,560	71.03%	3,604
Coahoma	4,958	72.91%	1,842	27.09%	3,116	45.82%	6,800
Copiah	5,810	49.47%	5,934	50.53%	-124	-1.06%	11,744
Franklin	1,297	31.82%	2,779	68.18%	-1,482	-36.36%	4,076
Grenada	4,253	43.69%	5,482	56.31%	-1,229	-12.62%	9,735
Hinds (part)	58,528	76.39%	18,088	23.61%	40,440	52.78%	76,616
Holmes	5,625	83.05%	1,148	16.95%	4,477	66.10%	6,773
Humphreys	2,578	73.62%	924	26.38%	1,654	47.23%	3,502
Issaquena	296	49.92%	297	50.08%	-1	-0.17%	593
Jefferson	2,864	85.29%	494	14.71%	2,370	70.58%	3,358
Leake	3,382	40.30%	5,010	59.70%	-1,628	-19.40%	8,392
Leflore	6,693	70.55%	2,794	29.45%	3,899	41.10%	9,487
Madison (part)	8,038	74.91%	2,692	25.09%	5,346	49.82%	10,730
Montgomery	1,860	42.20%	2,548	57.80%	-688	-15.61%	4,408
Panola	6,611	45.80%	7,824	54.20%	-1,213	-8.40%	14,435
Quitman	1,823	68.28%	847	31.72%	976	36.55%	2,670
Sharkey	1,236	69.91%	532	30.09%	704	39.82%	1,768
Sunflower	5,543	70.71%	2,296	29.29%	3,247	41.42%	7,839
Tallahatchie	2,936	57.66%	2,156	42.34%	780	15.32%	5,092
Tunica	1,921	71.73%	757	28.27%	1,164	43.47%	2,678
Warren	8,807	48.20%	9,465	51.80%	-658	-3.60%	18,272
Washington	10,036	69.37%	4,432	30.63%	5,604	38.73%	14,468
Wilkinson	1,873	64.48%	1,032	35.52%	841	28.95%	2,905
Yalobusha	2,494	42.47%	3,378	57.53%	-884	-15.05%	5,872
Yazoo	4,590	51.02%	4,406	48.98%	184	2.05%	8,996
Totals	177,885	62.02%	108,956	37.98%	68,929	24.03%	286,841

== District 3 ==
2024 Mississippi's 3rd congressional district
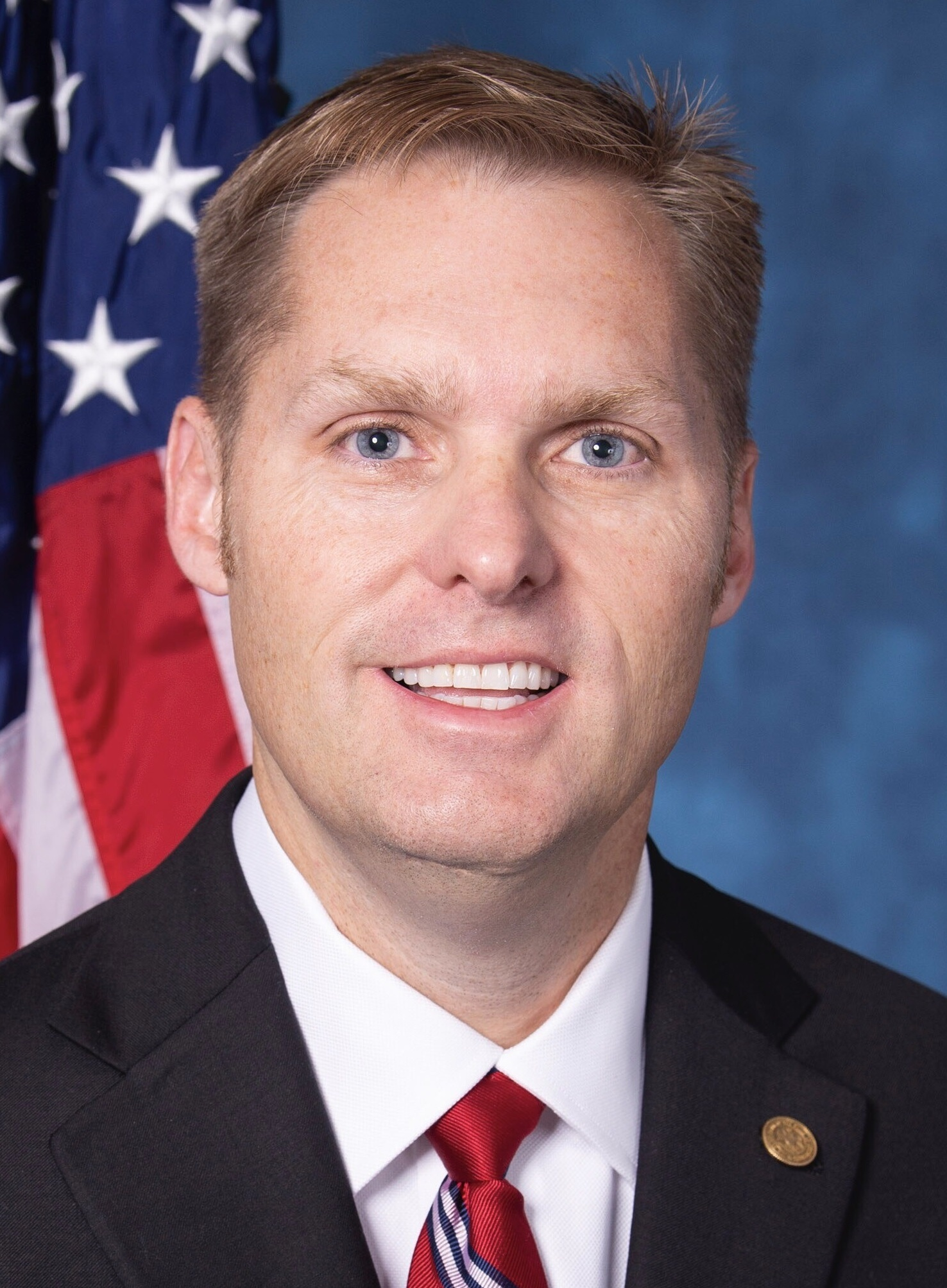
Nominee	Michael Guest
Party	Republican
Popular vote	265,159
Percentage	100.0%
- Guest: >90%
U.S. Representative before election
Michael Guest
Republican
Elected U.S. Representative
Michael Guest
Republican

The 3rd district is located in eastern and southwestern Mississippi, taking in Meridian, Starkville, Pearl, Brookhaven, and most of the wealthier portions of Jackson, including the portion of the city located in Rankin County. The incumbent is Republican Michael Guest, who was re-elected with 70.7% of the vote in 2022.

=== Republican primary ===
==== Candidates ====
===== Nominee =====
- Michael Guest, incumbent U.S. representative

==== Endorsements ====
Michael Guest

Organizations

- AIPAC

==== Fundraising ====
Campaign finance reports as of February 21, 2024
Candidate	Raised	Spent	Cash on hand
Michael Guest (R)	$517,479	$249,826	$292,671
Source: Federal Election Commission

=== Democratic primary ===
==== Withdrawn ====
- Jarvis Gordon, U.S. Department of Agriculture employee

=== General election ===
==== Predictions ====
Source	Ranking	As of
The Cook Political Report	Solid R	July 28, 2023
Inside Elections	Solid R	July 28, 2023
Sabato's Crystal Ball	Safe R	June 8, 2023
Elections Daily	Safe R	June 8, 2023
CNalysis	Solid R	November 16, 2023

==== Results ====
2024 Mississippi's 3rd congressional district election
Party	Candidate	Votes	%
Republican	Michael Guest (incumbent)	265,159	100.0
Total votes		265,159	100.0
Republican hold			

== District 4 ==
2024 Mississippi's 4th congressional district
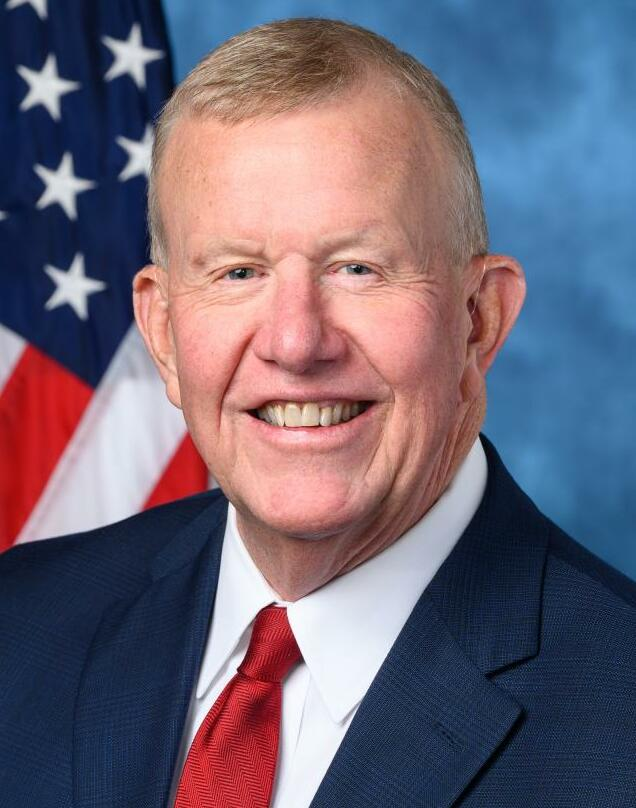

Nominee	Mike Ezell	Craig Raybon
Party	Republican	Democratic
Popular vote	215,095	75,771
Percentage	73.9%	26.1%
- Ezell: 50–60% 60–70% 70–80% 80–90% >90% Raybon: 50–60% 60–70% 70–80% 80–90% >90%
U.S. Representative before election
Mike Ezell
Republican
Elected U.S. Representative
Mike Ezell
Republican

The 4th district encompasses the Mississippi Gulf Coast, including Gulfport, Biloxi, Hattiesburg, Bay St. Louis, Laurel, and Pascagoula. The incumbent is Republican Mike Ezell, who was elected with 73.3% of the vote in 2022.

=== Republican primary ===
==== Candidates ====
===== Nominee =====
- Mike Ezell, incumbent U.S. representative

===== Eliminated in primary =====
- Carl Boyanton, produce store owner and candidate for this district in 2020 and 2022
- Michael McGill, retiree

==== Endorsements ====
Mike Ezell

Executive branch officials

- Donald Trump, 45th president of the United States

Organizations

- AIPAC

==== Fundraising ====
Campaign finance reports as of December 31, 2023
Candidate	Raised	Spent	Cash on hand
Carl Boyanton (R)	$531,145 (Note: $509,500 of this total was self-funded by Boyanton)	$163,379	$367,765
Mike Ezell (R)	$732,002	$568,296	$171,978
Michael McGill (R)	$9,617 (Note: $2,625 of this total was self-funded by McGill)	$4,651	$2,477
Source: Federal Election Commission

==== Results ====
Republican primary results
Party	Candidate	Votes	%
Republican	Mike Ezell (incumbent)	52,028	73.3
Republican	Carl Boyanton	13,432	18.9
Republican	Michael McGill	5,493	7.7
Total votes		70,953	100.0

=== Democratic primary ===
==== Candidates ====
===== Nominee =====
- Craig Raybon, truck driver

=== General election ===
==== Predictions ====
Source	Ranking	As of
The Cook Political Report	Solid R	July 28, 2023
Inside Elections	Solid R	July 28, 2023
Sabato's Crystal Ball	Safe R	June 8, 2023
Elections Daily	Safe R	June 8, 2023
CNalysis	Solid R	November 16, 2023

==== Results ====
2024 Mississippi's 4th congressional district election
Party	Candidate	Votes	%
Republican	Mike Ezell (incumbent)	215,095	73.9
Democratic	Craig Raybon	75,771	26.1
Total votes		290,866	100.0
Republican hold			

==== By county ====
County	Mike Ezell Republican		Craig Raybon Democratic		Margin		Total
County	#	%	#	%	#	%	Total
Forrest	17,631	62.36%	10,641	37.64%	6,990	24.72%	28,272
George	9,859	90.14%	1,078	9.86%	8,781	80.29%	10,937
Greene	4,827	86.01%	785	13.99%	4,042	72.02%	5,612
Hancock	16,945	81.29%	3,900	18.71%	13,045	62.58%	20,845
Harrison	50,752	67.67%	24,247	32.33%	26,505	35.34%	74,999
Jackson	38,288	73.65%	13,698	26.35%	24,590	47.30%	51,986
Jones (part)	17,735	75.00%	5,911	25.00%	11,824	50.00%	23,646
Lamar	21,437	76.87%	6,449	23.13%	14,988	53.75%	27,886
Pearl River	20,469	84.41%	3,781	15.59%	16,688	68.82%	24,250
Perry	4,527	82.13%	985	17.87%	3,542	64.26%	5,512
Stone	6,354	81.50%	1,442	18.50%	4,912	63.01%	7,796
Wayne	6,271	68.72%	2,854	31.28%	3,417	37.45%	9,125
Totals	215,095	73.95%	75,771	26.05%	139,324	47.90%	290,866
