= 2022 United States House of Representatives elections in Mississippi =

- November 8, 2022

All 4 Mississippi seats to the United States House of Representatives
	Majority party	Minority party
Party	Republican	Democratic
Last election	3	1
Seats won	3	1
Seat change	Steady	Steady
Popular vote	454,329	251,202
Percentage	64.07%	35.43%
Swing	▼1.64%	▲1.14%

Republican
50–60%
60–70%
70–80%
80–90%
>90%
Democratic
50–60%
60–70%
70–80%
80–90%

The 2022 United States House of Representatives elections in Mississippi were held on November 8, 2022, to elect the four U.S. representatives from the state of Mississippi, one from each of the state's four congressional districts. The elections coincided with other elections to the House of Representatives, elections to the United States Senate and various state and local elections.

The elections were the first under Mississippi's new congressional map after redistricting completed by the state government. All four races were considered uncompetitive in the general election and turnout from Mississippians was the lowest out of the entire United States, measuring in at 31.5%. Republican Representatives Michael Guest and Steven Palazzo faced competitive primaries, where both went to runoffs; Palazzo was ultimately ousted by Mike Ezell in the runoff, mainly in part to an investigation into Palazzo's supposed misuse of campaign funds. Republican representative Trent Kelly was the sole representative of the Mississippi delegation to receive a Trump endorsement and faced no serious challenge. The partisan composition of the delegation remained the same after the election.

== Overview ==
=== District ===
District	Republican		Democratic		Libertarian		Total		Result
District	Votes	%	Votes	%	Votes	%	Votes	%	Result
District 1	122,151	72.97%	45,238	27.03%	0	0.00%	167,389	100.00%	Republican hold
District 2	71,884	39.90%	108,285	60.10%	0	0.00%	180,169	100.00%	Democratic hold
District 3	132,481	70.74%	54,803	29.26%	0	0.00%	187,284	100.00%	Republican hold
District 4	127,813	73.35%	42,876	24.60%	3,569	2.05%	174,258	100.00%	Republican hold
Total	454,329	64.07%	251,202	35.43%	3,569	0.50%	709,100	100.00%	

Popular vote
Republican	64.07%
Democratic	35.43%
Libertarian	0.50%

House seats
Republican	75.00%
Democratic	25.00%

== District 1 ==
2022 Mississippi's 1st congressional district election
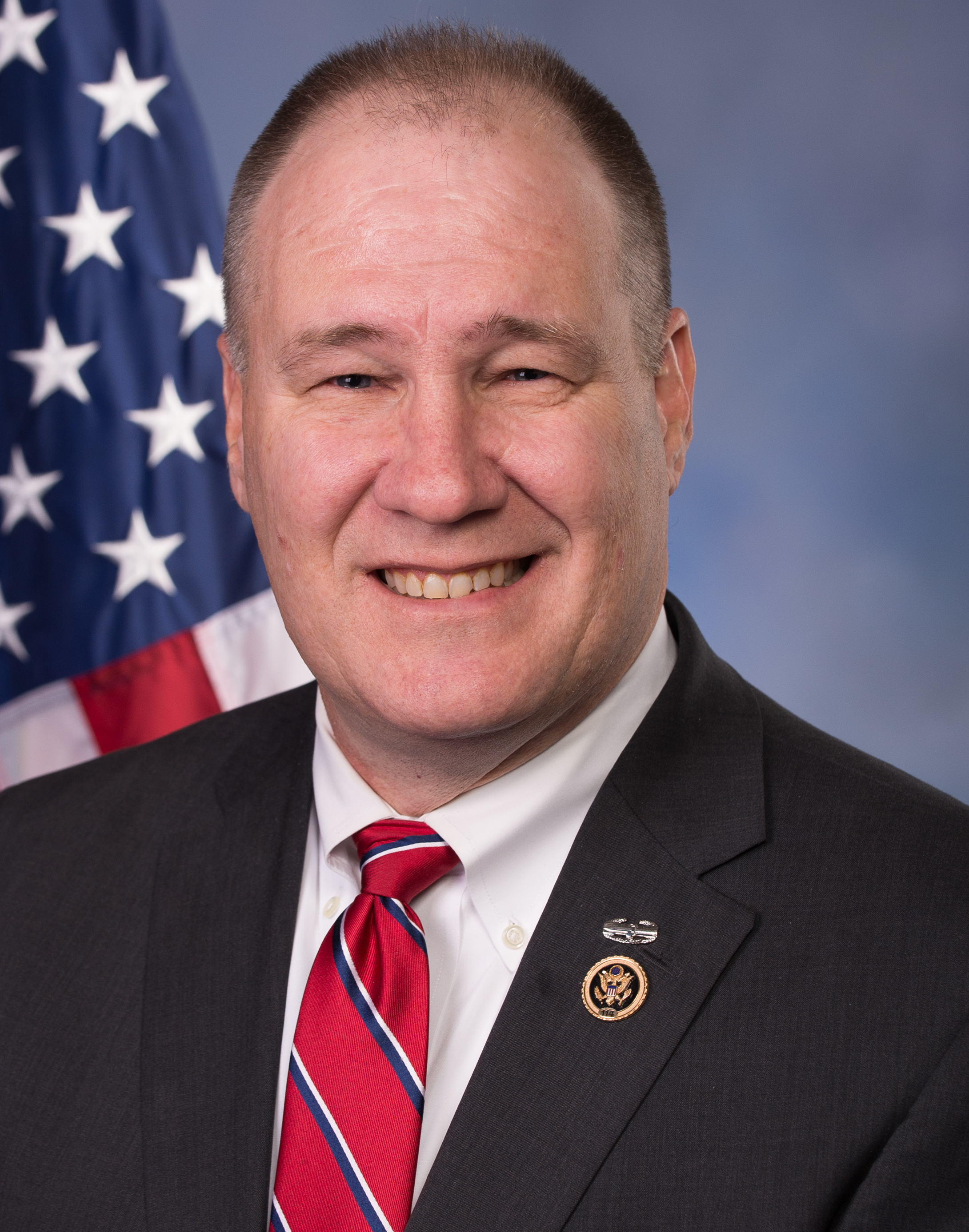

Nominee	Trent Kelly	Dianne Black
Party	Republican	Democratic
Popular vote	122,151	45,238
Percentage	73.0%	27.0%
- Kelly: 50–60% 60–70% 70–80% 80–90% >90% Black: 50–60% 60–70% 70–80% 80–90% >90% Tie: 50% No votes
U.S. Representative before election
Trent Kelly
Republican
Elected U.S. Representative
Trent Kelly
Republican

Democratic primary results by county
Black: 50–60% 60–70% 70–80% 80–90%

Republican primary results by county
Kelly: 70–80% 80–90% >90%

The 1st district takes in the northeastern area of the state, including Columbus, Oxford, Southaven, and Tupelo. The incumbent was Republican Trent Kelly, who was re-elected with 68.7% of the vote in 2020.

=== Republican primary ===
==== Candidates ====
===== Nominee =====
- Trent Kelly, incumbent U.S. Representative

===== Eliminated in primary =====
- Mark D. Strauss, Libertarian nominee for Iowa's 2nd congressional district in 2018

==== Endorsements ====
Trent Kelly

Federal officials

- Donald Trump, former president of the United States (2017–2021)

==== Results ====
Republican primary results
Party	Candidate	Votes	%
Republican	Trent Kelly (incumbent)	27,447	89.8
Republican	Mark D. Strauss	3,109	10.2
Total votes		30,556	100.0

=== Democratic primary ===
==== Candidates ====
===== Nominee =====
- Dianne Black, hair salon owner

===== Eliminated in primary =====
- Hunter Kyle Avery, manufacturing worker

==== Results ====
Democratic primary results
Party	Candidate	Votes	%
Democratic	Dianne Black	8,268	79.0
Democratic	Hunter Kyle Avery	2,203	21.0
Total votes		10,471	100.0

=== Independents ===
==== Filed paperwork ====
- James McCay

=== General election ===
==== Predictions ====
Source	Ranking	As of
The Cook Political Report	Solid R	January 24, 2022
Inside Elections	Solid R	March 21, 2022
Sabato's Crystal Ball	Safe R	January 26, 2022
Politico	Solid R	April 5, 2022
RCP	Safe R	June 9, 2022
Fox News	Solid R	July 11, 2022
DDHQ	Solid R	July 20, 2022
538	Solid R	June 30, 2022

==== Results ====
2022 Mississippi's 1st congressional district election
Party	Candidate	Votes	%
Republican	Trent Kelly (incumbent)	122,151	73.0
Democratic	Dianne Black	45,238	27.0
Total votes		167,389	100.0
Republican hold			

==== By county ====
County	Trent Kelly Republican		Dianne Black Democratic		Margin		Total
County	#	%	#	%	#	%	Total
Alcorn	6,179	87.53%	880	12.47%	5,299	75.07%	7,059
Benton	1,383	64.18%	772	35.82%	611	28.35%	2,155
Calhoun	2,789	80.77%	664	19.23%	2,125	61.54%	3,453
Chickasaw	2,619	61.23%	1,658	38.77%	961	22.47%	4,277
Choctaw	1,974	78.58%	538	21.42%	1,436	57.17%	2,512
Clay	3,217	50.91%	3,102	49.09%	115	1.82%	6,319
DeSoto	23,388	67.71%	11,151	32.29%	12,237	35.43%	34,539
Itawamba	5,402	92.64%	429	7.36%	4,973	85.29%	5,831
Lafayette	7,999	62.94%	4,709	37.06%	3,290	25.89%	12,708
Lee	13,283	76.24%	4,140	23.76%	9,143	52.48%	17,423
Lowndes	9,146	61.63%	5,694	38.37%	3,452	23.26%	14,840
Marshall	4,393	56.16%	3,429	43.84%	964	12.32%	7,822
Monroe	6,124	74.42%	2,105	25.58%	4,019	48.84%	8,229
Oktibbeha (part)	710	79.15%	187	20.85%	523	58.31%	897
Pontotoc	6,356	87.81%	882	12.19%	5,474	75.63%	7,238
Prentiss	4,177	86.98%	625	13.02%	3,552	73.97%	4,802
Tate	4,990	72.03%	1,938	27.97%	3,052	44.05%	6,928
Tippah	4,900	87.77%	683	12.23%	4,217	75.53%	5,583
Tishomingo	4,337	90.92%	433	9.08%	3,904	81.84%	4,770
Union	6,036	88.70%	769	11.30%	5,267	77.40%	6,805
Webster	2,749	85.93%	450	14.07%	2,299	71.87%	3,199
Totals	122,151	72.97%	45,238	27.03%	76,913	45.95%	167,389

== District 2 ==
2022 Mississippi's 2nd congressional district election
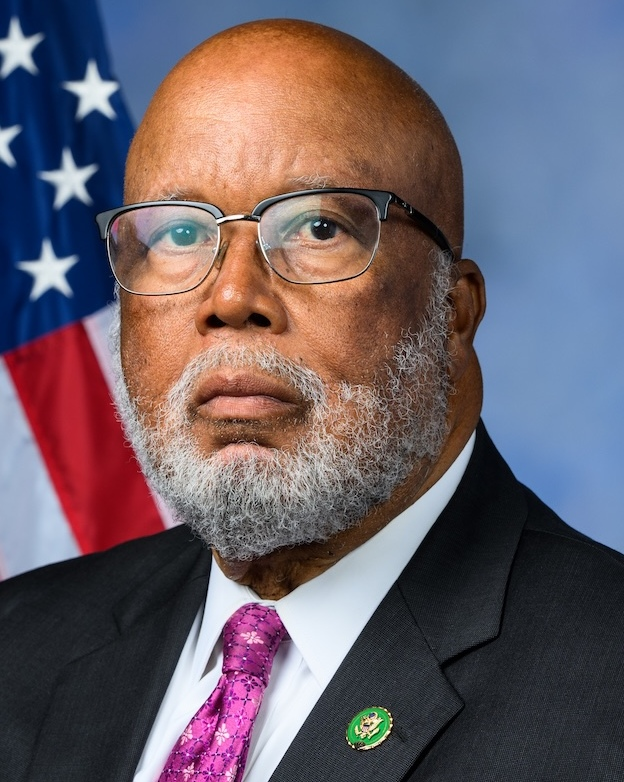

Nominee	Bennie Thompson	Brian Flowers
Party	Democratic	Republican
Popular vote	108,285	71,884
Percentage	60.1%	39.9%
- Thompson: 50–60% 60–70% 70–80% 80–90% >90% Flowers: 50–60% 60–70% 70–80% 80–90% >90% Tie: 50% No votes
U.S. Representative before election
Bennie Thompson
Democratic
Elected U.S. Representative
Bennie Thompson
Democratic

The 2nd district encompasses the Mississippi Delta, taking in most of Jackson, the riverfront cities of Greenville, Natchez and Vicksburg, and the interior market cities of Clarksdale, Greenwood and Clinton. The district was expanded during the 2020 census redistricting. The incumbent was Democrat Bennie Thompson, who was re-elected with 66.0% of the vote in 2020. Thompson cruised to re-election as expected, though Brian Flowers did give him his toughest race since 2004, when Clinton LeSueur achieved 41% of the vote.

=== Democratic primary ===
==== Candidates ====
===== Nominee =====
- Bennie Thompson, incumbent U.S. Representative

===== Eliminated in primary =====
- Jerry Kerner, gun dealer

==== Endorsements ====
Bennie Thompson

Organizations

- Planned Parenthood Action Fund

==== Results ====
Democratic primary results by county Thompson: 70–80% 80–90% 90–100%

Democratic primary results
Party	Candidate	Votes	%
Democratic	Bennie Thompson (incumbent)	49,907	96.3
Democratic	Jerry Kerner	1,927	3.7
Total votes		51,834	100.0

=== Republican primary ===
==== Candidates ====
===== Nominee =====
- Brian Flowers, nuclear plant technician, U.S. Navy veteran, and nominee for this district in 2020

===== Eliminated in runoff =====
- Ron Eller, physician assistant and U.S. Army veteran

===== Eliminated in primary =====
- Michael Carson
- Stanford Johnson

==== Endorsements ====
Ron Eller

Executive Branch officials

- Michael Flynn, former United States National Security Advisor (2017) and former Director of the Defense Intelligence Agency (2012–2014) (Democratic)

Organizations

- SEAL PAC

==== Results ====
Republican primary results by county
Flowers: 30–40% 40–50% 50–60% 60–70%
Eller: 30–40% 50–60%

Republican primary runoff results by county
Flowers: 50–60% 60–70% 70–80% 80–90%
Eller: 50–60% 60–70%

Republican primary results
Party	Candidate	Votes	%
Republican	Brian Flowers	6,087	43.2
Republican	Ronald Eller	4,564	32.4
Republican	Michael Carson	2,966	21.0
Republican	Stanford Johnson	487	3.5
Total votes		14,104	100.0

Republican primary runoff results
Party	Candidate	Votes	%
Republican	Brian Flowers	6,224	58.5
Republican	Ronald Eller	4,418	41.5
Total votes		10,642	100.0

=== General election ===
==== Predictions ====
Source	Ranking	As of
The Cook Political Report	Solid D	January 24, 2022
Inside Elections	Solid D	March 21, 2022
Sabato's Crystal Ball	Safe D	January 26, 2022
Politico	Solid D	April 5, 2022
RCP	Safe D	June 9, 2022
Fox News	Solid D	July 11, 2022
DDHQ	Solid D	July 20, 2022
538	Solid D	June 30, 2022

==== Results ====
2022 Mississippi's 2nd congressional district election
Party	Candidate	Votes	%
Democratic	Bennie Thompson (incumbent)	108,285	60.1
Republican	Brian Flowers	71,884	39.9
Total votes		180,169	100.0
Democratic hold			

==== By county ====
County	Bennie Thompson Democratic		Brian Flowers Republican		Margin		Total
County	#	%	#	%	#	%	Total
Adams	4,469	53.93%	3,817	46.07%	652	7.87%	8,286
Amite	1,538	32.97%	3,127	67.03%	-1,589	-34.06%	4,665
Attala	2,008	38.60%	3,194	61.40%	-1,186	-22.80%	5,202
Bolivar	4,912	64.08%	2,753	35.92%	2,159	28.17%	7,665
Carroll	1,112	29.75%	2,626	70.25%	-1,514	-40.50%	3,738
Claiborne	1,795	85.03%	316	14.97%	1,479	70.06%	2,111
Coahoma	2,582	70.07%	1,103	29.93%	1,479	40.14%	3,685
Copiah	3,195	46.59%	3,662	53.41%	-467	-6.81%	6,857
Franklin	871	31.06%	1,933	68.94%	-1,062	-37.87%	2,804
Grenada	2,574	42.09%	3,541	57.91%	-967	-15.81%	6,115
Hinds (part)	35,371	76.22%	11,036	23.78%	24,335	52.44%	46,407
Holmes	3,558	82.55%	752	17.45%	2,806	65.10%	4,310
Humphreys	2,174	71.37%	872	28.63%	1,302	42.74%	3,046
Issaquena	285	48.55%	302	51.45%	-17	-2.90%	587
Jefferson	1,712	84.29%	319	15.71%	1,393	68.59%	2,031
Leake	2,069	39.24%	3,204	60.76%	-1,135	-21.52%	5,273
Leflore	4,244	69.08%	1,900	30.92%	2,344	38.15%	6,144
Madison (part)	4,592	74.56%	1,567	25.44%	3,025	49.12%	6,159
Montgomery	1,225	40.87%	1,772	59.13%	-547	-18.25%	2,997
Panola	3,330	42.69%	4,470	57.31%	-1,140	-14.62%	7,800
Quitman	1,009	68.69%	460	31.31%	549	37.37%	1,469
Sharkey	720	65.22%	384	34.78%	336	30.43%	1,104
Sunflower	3,192	68.03%	1,500	31.97%	1,692	36.06%	4,692
Tallahatchie	1,775	56.98%	1,340	43.02%	435	13.96%	3,115
Tunica	922	65.62%	483	34.38%	439	31.25%	1,405
Warren	5,258	44.50%	6,558	55.50%	-1,300	-11.00%	11,816
Washington	6,025	68.72%	2,742	31.28%	3,283	37.45%	8,767
Wilkinson	1,549	64.68%	846	35.32%	703	29.35%	2,395
Yalobusha	1,835	42.15%	2,518	57.85%	-683	-15.69%	4,353
Yazoo	2,384	46.10%	2,787	53.90%	-403	-7.79%	5,171
Totals	108,285	60.10%	71,884	39.90%	36,401	20.20%	180,169

== District 3 ==
2022 Mississippi's 3rd congressional district election
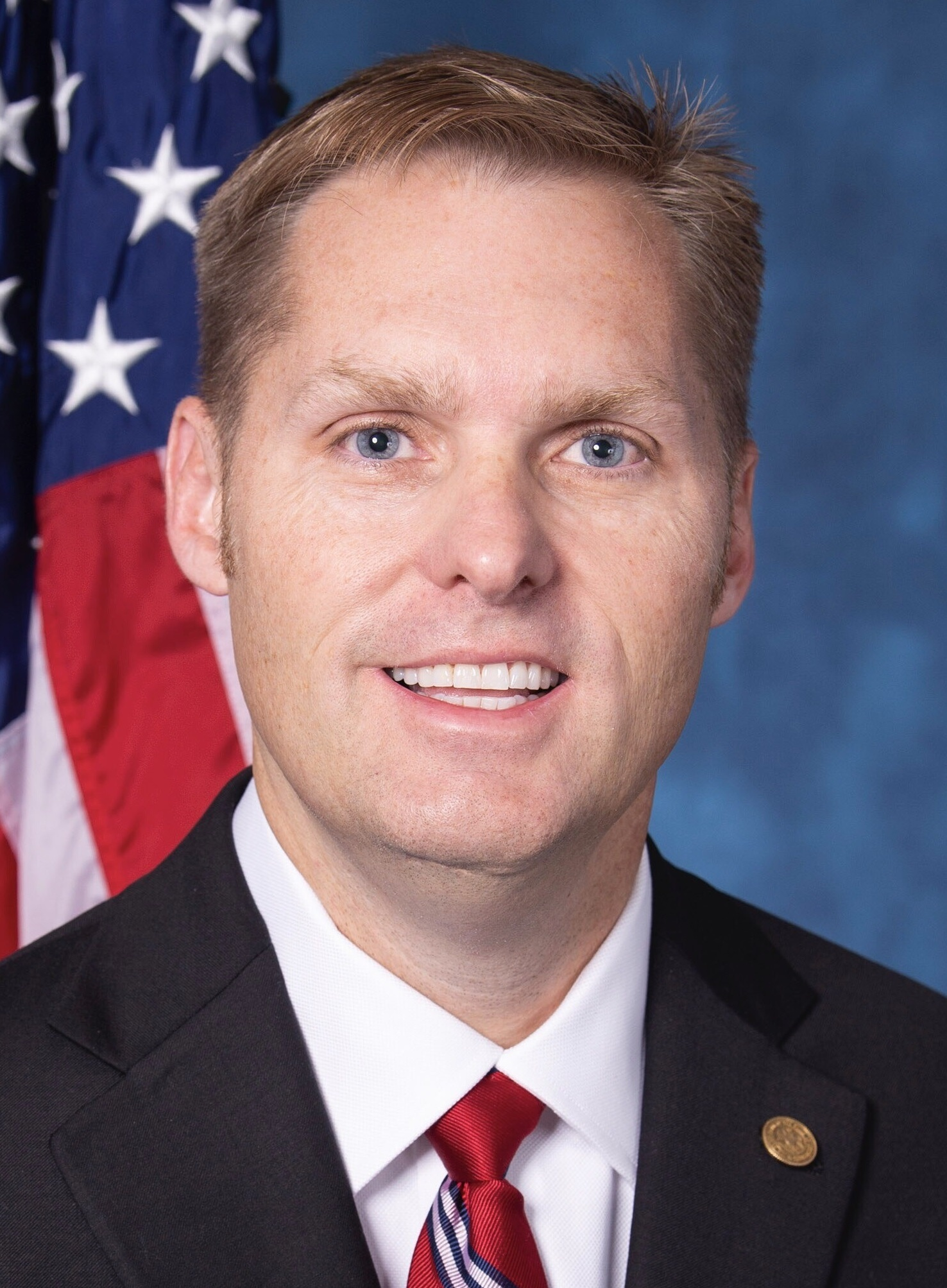

Nominee	Michael Guest	Shuwaski Young
Party	Republican	Democratic
Popular vote	132,481	54,803
Percentage	70.7%	29.3%
- Guest: 50–60% 60–70% 70–80% 80–90% >90% Young: 50–60% 60–70% 70–80% 80–90% >90% No votes
U.S. Representative before election
Michael Guest
Republican
Elected U.S. Representative
Michael Guest
Republican

The 3rd district is located in eastern and southwestern Mississippi, taking in Meridian, Starkville, Pearl, Brookhaven, and most of the wealthier portions of Jackson, including the portion of the city located in Rankin County. The district was reduced to include only four of the cities, plus a wealthy area of Jackson due to 2020 census redistricting. The incumbent was Republican Michael Guest, who was elected with 64.7% of the vote in 2020. Guest managed to flip Kemper County, which gave Joe Biden 61.02% of the vote in the 2020 presidential election.

=== Republican primary ===
==== Candidates ====
===== Nominee =====
- Michael Guest, incumbent U.S. Representative

===== Eliminated in runoff =====
- Michael Cassidy, U.S. Navy veteran

===== Eliminated in primary =====
- Thomas Griffin, businessman

Republican primary results by county Cassidy: 40–50% 50–60% 60–70% Guest: 40–50% 50–60% 60–70%

==== Results ====
Republican primary results
Party	Candidate	Votes	%
Republican	Michael Guest (incumbent)	23,675	47.5
Republican	Michael Cassidy	23,407	46.9
Republican	Thomas Griffin	2,785	5.6
Total votes		49,867	100.0

Republican primary runoff results by county Cassidy: 50–60% Guest: 50–60% 60–70% 70–80% 80–90%

Republican primary runoff results
Party	Candidate	Votes	%
Republican	Michael Guest (incumbent)	47,007	67.4
Republican	Michael Cassidy	22,713	32.6
Total votes		69,720	100.0

=== Democratic primary ===
==== Candidates ====
===== Nominee =====
- Shuwaski Young, political organizer

===== Withdrawn =====
- Rahim Talley, businessman, Iraq war veteran and progressive activist

=== General election ===
==== Predictions ====
Source	Ranking	As of
The Cook Political Report	Solid R	January 24, 2022
Inside Elections	Solid R	March 21, 2022
Sabato's Crystal Ball	Safe R	January 26, 2022
Politico	Solid R	April 5, 2022
RCP	Safe R	June 9, 2022
Fox News	Solid R	July 11, 2022
DDHQ	Solid R	July 20, 2022
538	Solid R	June 30, 2022

==== Results ====
2022 Mississippi's 3rd congressional district election
Party	Candidate	Votes	%
Republican	Michael Guest (incumbent)	132,481	70.7
Democratic	Shuwaski Young	54,803	29.3
Total votes		187,284	100.0
Republican hold			

==== By county ====
County	Michael Guest Republican		Shuwaski Young Democratic		Margin		Total
County	#	%	#	%	#	%	Total
Clarke	3,503	74.44%	1,203	25.56%	2,300	48.87%	4,706
Covington	3,750	72.59%	1,416	27.41%	2,334	45.18%	5,166
Hinds (part)	3,607	56.64%	2,761	43.36%	846	13.29%	6,368
Jasper	2,629	59.09%	1,820	40.91%	809	18.18%	4,449
Jefferson Davis	1,555	48.47%	1,653	51.53%	-98	-3.05%	3,208
Jones (part)	1,908	82.38%	408	17.62%	1,500	64.77%	2,316
Kemper	1,204	50.44%	1,183	49.56%	21	0.88%	2,387
Lauderdale	10,895	67.92%	5,145	32.08%	5,750	35.85%	16,040
Lawrence	2,758	70.99%	1,127	29.01%	1,631	41.98%	3,885
Lincoln	6,921	77.57%	2,001	22.43%	4,920	55.14%	8,922
Madison (part)	18,394	73.61%	6,593	26.39%	11,801	47.23%	24,987
Marion	4,842	75.36%	1,583	24.64%	3,259	50.72%	6,425
Neshoba	4,832	80.23%	1,191	19.77%	3,641	60.45%	6,023
Newton	4,501	78.80%	1,211	21.20%	3,290	57.60%	5,712
Noxubee	1,039	34.12%	2,006	65.88%	-967	-31.76%	3,045
Oktibbeha (part)	5,152	55.11%	4,196	44.89%	956	10.23%	9,348
Pike	5,607	59.74%	3,779	40.26%	1,828	19.48%	9,386
Rankin	30,740	79.55%	7,904	20.45%	22,836	59.09%	38,644
Scott	3,749	67.48%	1,807	32.52%	1,942	34.95%	5,556
Simpson	5,217	73.33%	1,897	26.67%	3,320	46.67%	7,114
Smith	3,803	84.57%	694	15.43%	3,109	69.13%	4,497
Walthall	2,603	68.92%	1,174	31.08%	1,429	37.83%	3,777
Winston	3,272	61.47%	2,051	38.53%	1,221	22.94%	5,323
Totals	132,481	70.74%	54,803	29.26%	77,678	41.48%	187,284

== District 4 ==
2022 Mississippi's 4th congressional district election
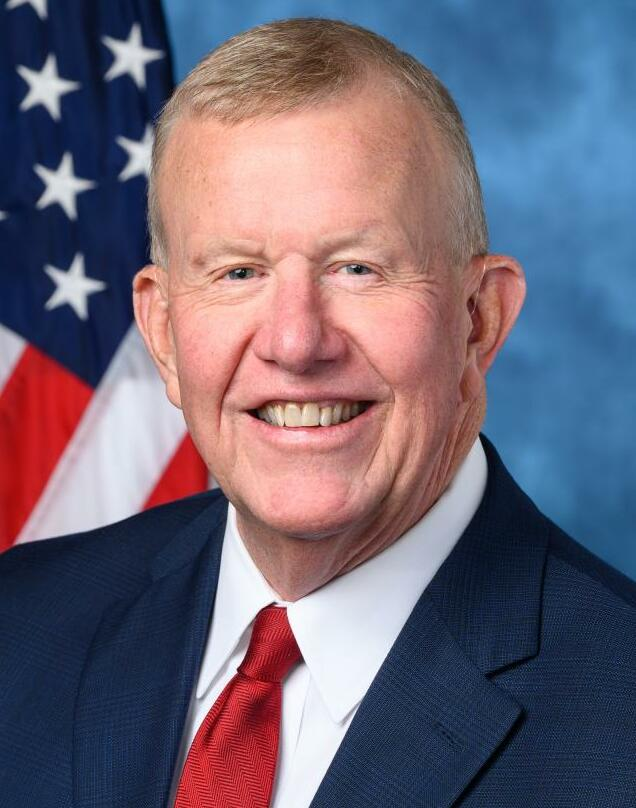

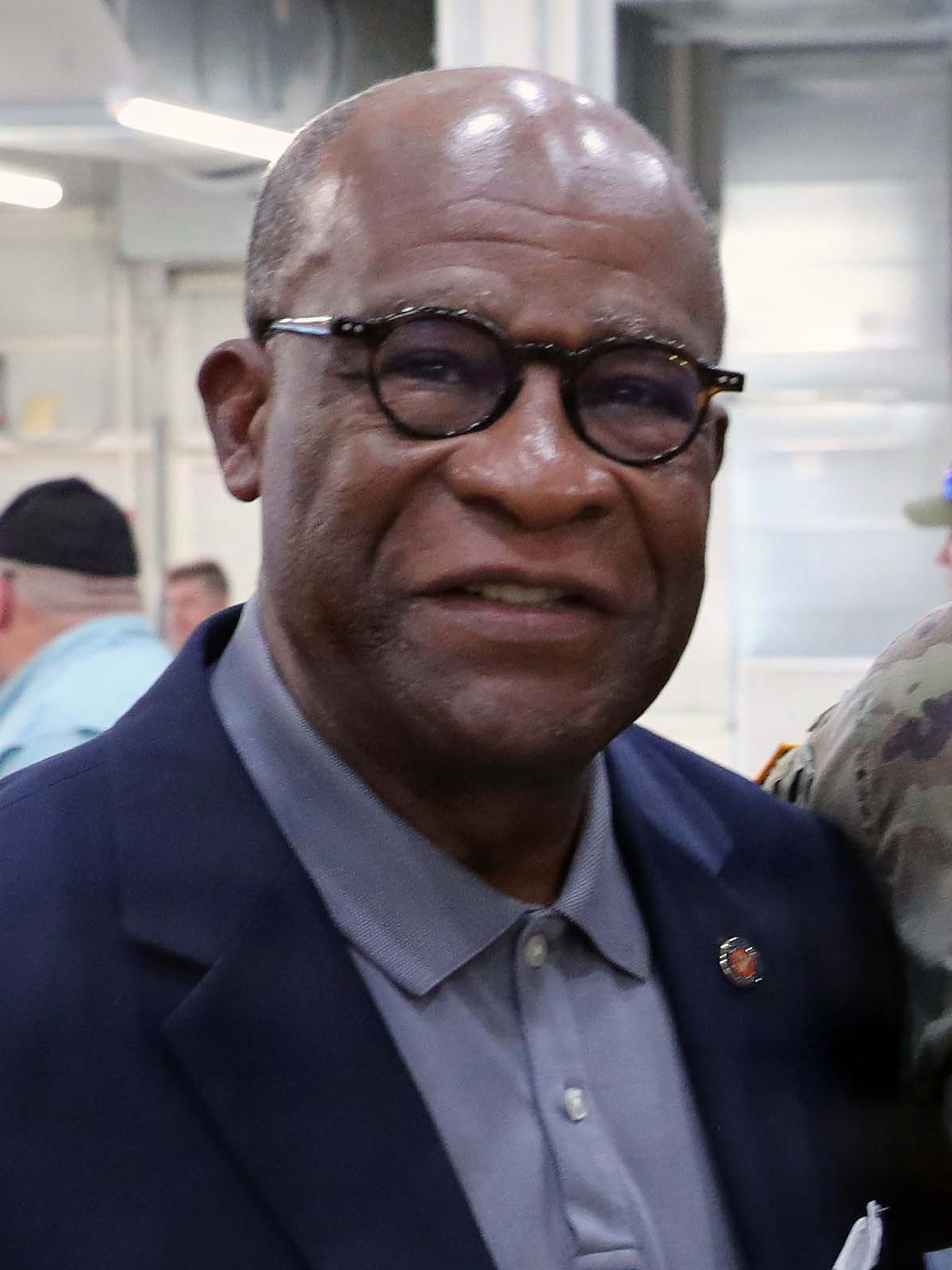
Nominee	Mike Ezell	Johnny DuPree
Party	Republican	Democratic
Popular vote	127,813	42,876
Percentage	73.3%	24.6%
- Ezell: 40–50% 50–60% 60–70% 70–80% 80–90% >90% DuPree: 40–50% 50–60% 60–70% 70–80% 80–90% >90% No votes
U.S. Representative before election
Steven Palazzo
Republican
Elected U.S. Representative
Mike Ezell
Republican

The 4th district encompasses the Mississippi Gulf Coast, including Gulfport, Biloxi, Hattiesburg, Bay St. Louis, Laurel, and Pascagoula. The incumbent was Republican Steven Palazzo, who was re-elected unopposed in 2020.

=== Republican primary ===
==== Candidates ====
===== Nominee =====
- Mike Ezell, Jackson County sheriff and former Ocean Springs police chief

===== Eliminated in runoff =====
- Steven Palazzo, incumbent U.S. Representative

===== Eliminated in primary =====
- Carl Boyanton, produce store owner and candidate for this district in 2020
- Raymond Brooks, police officer
- Kidron Peterson
- Clay Wagner, banker
- Brice Wiggins, state senator

==== Endorsements ====
Mike Ezell

State legislators

- Brice Wiggins, state senator from the 52nd district

Individuals

- Carl Boyanton, Republican primary candidate and produce store owner
- Raymond Brooks, Republican primary candidate and police officer
- Kidron Peterson, Republican primary candidate
- Clay Wagner, Republican primary candidate and banker

==== Polling ====
Poll source	Date(s) administered	Sample size (Note: Key: A – all adults RV – registered voters LV – likely voters V – unclear)	Margin of error	Carl Boyanton	Raymond Brooks	Mike Ezell	Steven Palazzo	Clay Wagner	Brice Wiggins	Undecided
Public Opinion Strategies (R) (Note: Poll sponsored by Palazzo's campaign)	December 11–14, 2021	400 (LV)	± 4.9%	1%	1%	8%	65%	2%	4%	19%

Republican primary results by county Ezell: 30–40% 40–50% Palazzo: 20–30% 30–40% 40–50% Wagner: 30–40%

==== Results ====
Republican primary results
Party	Candidate	Votes	%
Republican	Steven Palazzo (incumbent)	16,387	31.5
Republican	Mike Ezell	13,020	25.0
Republican	Clay Wagner	11,698	22.5
Republican	Brice Wiggins	4,859	9.3
Republican	Carl Boyanton	3,224	6.2
Republican	Raymond Brooks	2,405	4.6
Republican	Kidron Peterson	449	0.9
Total votes		52,042	100.0

Republican primary runoff results by county Ezell: 50–60% 60–70% Palazzo: 50–60%

Republican primary runoff results
Party	Candidate	Votes	%
Republican	Mike Ezell	31,225	53.8
Republican	Steven Palazzo (incumbent)	26,849	46.2
Total votes		58,074	100.0

=== Democratic primary ===
==== Candidates ====
===== Nominee =====
- Johnny DuPree, former mayor of Hattiesburg; nominee for Governor of Mississippi in 2011 and Secretary of State of Mississippi in 2019

===== Eliminated in primary =====
- David Sellers, pastor

==== Endorsements ====
David Sellers

Organizations

- Mississippi State University College Democrats

Labor unions

- AFL–CIO
- International Brotherhood of Electrical Workers

Democratic primary results by county Dupree: >90% 80–90% 70–80%

==== Results ====
Democratic primary results
Party	Candidate	Votes	%
Democratic	Johnny DuPree	9,952	84.9
Democratic	David Sellers	1,766	15.1
Total votes		11,718	100.0

=== Libertarian primary ===
==== Candidates ====
===== Declared =====
- Alden Patrick Johnson, firefighter

=== Independents ===
==== Candidates ====
===== Withdrawn or disqualified =====
- Graham Hudson

=== General election ===
==== Predictions ====
Source	Ranking	As of
The Cook Political Report	Solid R	January 24, 2022
Inside Elections	Solid R	March 21, 2022
Sabato's Crystal Ball	Safe R	January 26, 2022
Politico	Solid R	April 5, 2022
RCP	Safe R	June 9, 2022
Fox News	Solid R	July 11, 2022
DDHQ	Solid R	July 20, 2022
538	Solid R	June 30, 2022

==== Endorsements ====
Mike Ezell

Federal officials

- Donald Trump, former president of the United States (2017–2021)

==== Results ====
2022 Mississippi's 4th congressional district election
Party	Candidate	Votes	%
Republican	Mike Ezell	127,813	73.3
Democratic	Johnny DuPree	42,876	24.6
Libertarian	Alden Patrick Johnson	3,569	2.0
Total votes		174,258	100.0
Republican hold			

==== By county ====
County	Mike Ezell Republican		Johnny DuPree Democratic		Alden Patrick Johnson Libertarian		Margin		Total
County	#	%	#	%	#	%	#	%	Total
Forrest	10,802	60.48%	6,543	36.63%	516	2.89%	4,259	23.85%	17,861
George	5,984	89.55%	575	8.61%	123	1.84%	5,409	80.95%	6,682
Greene	2,862	82.98%	548	15.89%	39	1.13%	2,314	67.09%	3,449
Hancock	9,767	79.91%	2,256	18.46%	200	1.64%	7,511	61.45%	12,223
Harrison	28,455	67.95%	12,577	30.03%	844	2.02%	15,878	37.92%	41,876
Jackson	24,036	73.25%	8,184	24.94%	594	1.81%	15,852	48.31%	32,814
Jones (part)	10,816	74.05%	3,575	24.48%	215	1.47%	7,241	49.58%	14,606
Lamar	13,496	77.44%	3,352	19.23%	580	3.33%	10,144	58.21%	17,428
Pearl River	11,163	84.52%	1,822	13.80%	222	1.68%	9,341	70.73%	13,207
Perry	2,689	77.25%	715	20.54%	77	2.21%	1,974	56.71%	3,481
Stone	3,819	79.56%	866	18.04%	115	2.40%	2,953	61.52%	4,800
Wayne	3,924	67.30%	1,863	31.95%	44	0.75%	2,061	35.35%	5,831
Totals	127,813	73.35%	42,876	24.60%	3,569	2.05%	84,937	48.74%	174,258

== Notes ==
Partisan clients
