= 2020 United States House of Representatives elections in Mississippi =

- November 3, 2020

All 4 Mississippi seats to the United States House of Representatives
	Majority party	Minority party
Party	Republican	Democratic
Last election	3	1
Seats won	3	1
Seat change	Steady	Steady
Popular vote	806,859	421,121
Percentage	65.71%	34.29%
Swing	▲15.53%	▼8.18%

Republican
50–60%
60–70%
70–80%
80–90%
>90%
Democratic
50–60%
60–70%
70–80%
80–90%

The 2020 United States House of Representatives elections in Mississippi were held on Tuesday, November 3, 2020, to elect the four U.S. representatives from the U.S. state of Mississippi; one from each of the state's four congressional districts. Primaries were scheduled for March 10, 2020.

== Overview ==
District	Republican		Democratic		Total		Result
District	Votes	%	Votes	%	Votes	%	Result
District 1	228,787	68.75%	104,008	31.25%	332,795	100.0%	Republican hold
District 2	101,010	33.98%	196,224	66.02%	297,234	100.0%	Democratic hold
District 3	221,064	64.67%	120,782	35.32%	341,846	100.0%	Republican hold
District 4	255,971	100.00%	0	0.00%	255,971	100.0%	Republican hold
Total	806,859	65.71%	421,121	34.29%	1,227,846	100.0%	

Popular vote
Republican	65.71%
Democratic	34.29%

House seats
Republican	75.00%
Democratic	25.00%

== District 1 ==
2020 Mississippi's 1st congressional district election

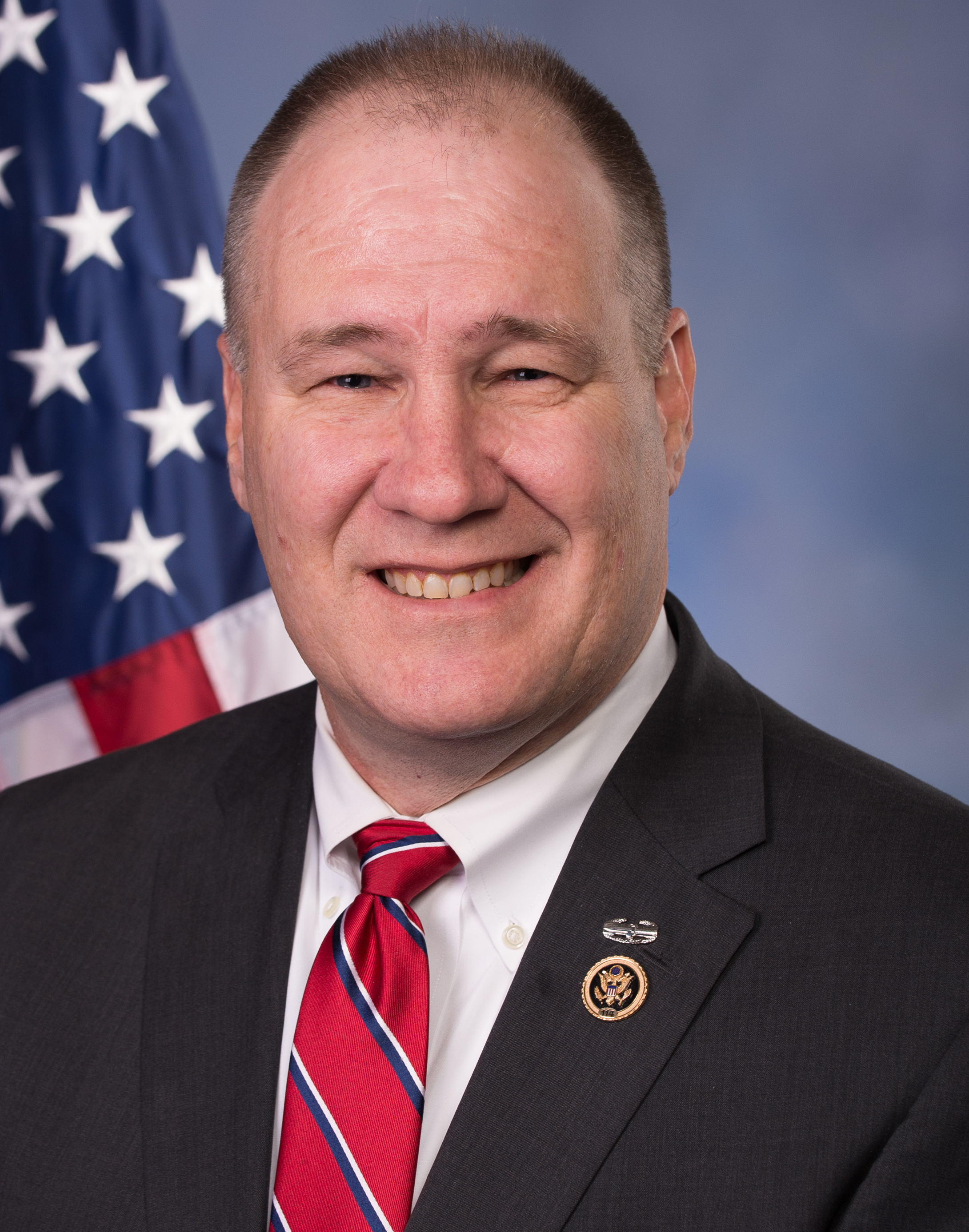

Nominee	Trent Kelly	Antonia Eliason
Party	Republican	Democratic
Popular vote	228,787	104,008
Percentage	68.7%	31.3%
- Kelly: 50–60% 60–70% 70–80% 80–90% >90% Eliason: 50–60% 60–70% 70–80% 80–90% >90%
U.S. Representative before election
Trent Kelly
Republican
Elected U.S. Representative
Trent Kelly
Republican

The 1st district takes in the northeastern area of the state, including Columbus, Oxford, Southaven, and Tupelo. The incumbent was Republican Trent Kelly, who was re-elected with 66.9% of the vote in 2018.

=== Republican primary ===
==== Candidates ====
===== Declared =====
- Trent Kelly, incumbent U.S. representative

==== Primary results ====
Republican primary results
Party	Candidate	Votes	%
Republican	Trent Kelly (incumbent)	56,501	100.0%
Total votes		56,501	100.0%

=== Democratic primary ===
==== Candidates ====
===== Declared =====
- Antonia Eliason, University of Mississippi law professor

==== Primary results ====
Democratic primary results
Party	Candidate	Votes	%
Democratic	Antonia Eliason	37,830	100.0%
Total votes		37,830	100.0%

=== General election ===
==== Predictions ====
Source	Ranking	As of
The Cook Political Report	Safe R	July 2, 2020
Inside Elections	Safe R	June 2, 2020
Sabato's Crystal Ball	Safe R	July 2, 2020
Politico	Safe R	April 19, 2020
Daily Kos	Safe R	June 3, 2020
RCP	Safe R	June 9, 2020
Niskanen	Safe R	June 7, 2020

==== Results ====
2020 Mississippi's 1st congressional district election
Party	Candidate	Votes	%
Republican	Trent Kelly (incumbent)	228,787	68.7
Democratic	Antonia Eliason	104,008	31.3
Total votes		332,795	100.0
Republican hold			

==== By county ====
County	Trent Kelly Republican		Antonia Eliason Democratic		Margin		Total
County	#	%	#	%	#	%	Total
Alcorn	12,780	83.96%	2,441	16.04%	10,339	67.93%	15,221
Benton	2,567	63.84%	1,454	36.16%	1,113	27.68%	4,021
Calhoun	4,764	74.53%	1,628	25.47%	3,136	49.06%	6,392
Chickasaw	4,548	58.30%	3,253	41.70%	1,295	16.60%	7,801
Choctaw	3,023	73.16%	1,109	26.84%	1,914	46.32%	4,132
Clay	4,714	48.25%	5,055	51.75%	-341	-3.49%	9,769
DeSoto	47,838	63.71%	27,255	36.29%	20,583	27.41%	75,093
Itawamba	9,514	90.08%	1,048	9.92%	8,466	80.16%	10,562
Lafayette	13,941	60.40%	9,141	39.60%	4,800	20.80%	23,082
Lee	25,028	70.21%	10,620	29.79%	14,408	40.42%	35,648
Lowndes	14,576	55.77%	11,562	44.23%	3,014	11.53%	26,138
Marshall	7,621	52.23%	6,971	47.77%	650	4.45%	14,592
Monroe	11,646	70.09%	4,970	29.91%	6,676	40.18%	16,616
Oktibbeha (part)	1,015	62.93%	598	37.07%	417	25.85%	1,613
Pontotoc	11,787	84.23%	2,206	15.77%	9,581	68.47%	13,993
Prentiss	8,613	83.19%	1,740	16.81%	6,873	66.39%	10,353
Tate	8,699	69.78%	3,767	30.22%	4,932	39.56%	12,466
Tippah	8,050	82.79%	1,673	17.21%	6,377	65.59%	9,723
Tishomingo	7,887	89.06%	969	10.94%	6,918	78.12%	8,856
Union	10,505	85.31%	1,809	14.69%	8,696	70.62%	12,314
Webster	4,349	83.14%	882	16.86%	3,467	66.28%	5,231
Winston	5,322	57.98%	3,857	42.02%	1,465	15.96%	9,179
Totals	228,787	68.75%	104,008	31.25%	124,779	37.49%	332,795

== District 2 ==
2020 Mississippi's 2nd congressional district election

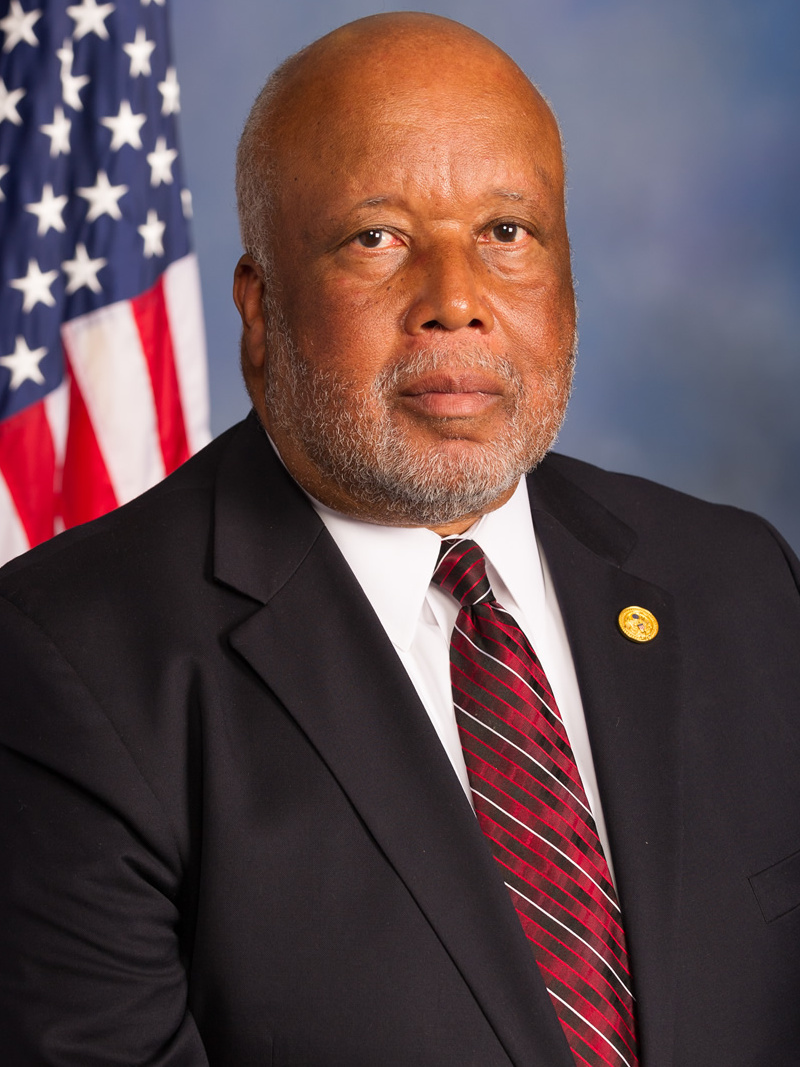

Nominee	Bennie Thompson	Brian Flowers
Party	Democratic	Republican
Popular vote	196,224	101,010
Percentage	66.0%	34.0%
- Thompson: 50–60% 60–70% 70–80% 80–90% >90% Flowers: 50–60% 60–70% 70–80% 80–90% >90% Tie: 50% No votes
U.S. Representative before election
Bennie Thompson
Democratic
Elected U.S. Representative
Bennie Thompson
Democratic

The 2nd district encompasses the Mississippi Delta, taking in most of Jackson, the riverfront cities of Greenville and Vicksburg, and the interior market cities of Clarksdale, Greenwood and Clinton. The incumbent was Democrat Bennie Thompson, who was re-elected with 71.8% of the vote in 2018 without major-party opposition.

=== Democratic primary ===
==== Candidates ====
===== Declared =====
- Sonia Rathburn, non-profit owner
- Bennie Thompson, incumbent U.S. representative

==== Primary results ====
2020 Mississippi's 2nd congressional district Democratic primary results by county Thompson: Thompson—≥90%; Thompson—80–90%

Democratic primary results
Party	Candidate	Votes	%
Democratic	Bennie Thompson (incumbent)	97,921	94.0
Democratic	Sonia Rathburn	6,256	6.0
Total votes		104,177	100.0%

=== Republican primary ===
==== Candidates ====
===== Declared =====
- Thomas Carey, realtor
- Brian Flowers, nuclear worker, Navy veteran
- B.C. Hammond, volunteer firefighter, farmer and small business owner

==== Primary results ====
2020 Mississippi's 2nd congressional district Republican primary initial round results by county Flowers: Flowers—60–70%; Flowers—50–60%; Flowers—40–50%; Flowers—30–40%; Carey: Carey—30–40%; Carey—40–50%; Carey—50–60%; Hammond: Hammond—40–50%; Hammond—50–60%; Hammond—60–70%

Republican primary results
Party	Candidate	Votes	%
Republican	Brian Flowers	9,883	37.9
Republican	Thomas Carey	9,456	36.1
Republican	B.C. Hammond	6,812	26.0
Total votes		26,151	100.0%

==== Runoff results ====
Republican primary runoff results
Party	Candidate	Votes	%
Republican	Brian Flowers	3,747	70.0%
Republican	Thomas Carey	1,607	30.0%
Total votes		5,354	100.0%

=== General election ===
==== Predictions ====
Source	Ranking	As of
The Cook Political Report	Safe D	July 2, 2020
Inside Elections	Safe D	June 2, 2020
Sabato's Crystal Ball	Safe D	July 2, 2020
Politico	Safe D	April 19, 2020
Daily Kos	Safe D	June 3, 2020
RCP	Safe D	June 9, 2020
Niskanen	Safe D	June 7, 2020

==== Results ====
2020 Mississippi's 2nd congressional district election
Party	Candidate	Votes	%
Democratic	Bennie Thompson (incumbent)	196,224	66.0
Republican	Brian Flowers	101,010	34.0
Total votes		297,234	100.0
Democratic hold			

==== By county ====
County	Bennie Thompson Democratic		Brian Flowers Republican		Margin		Total
County	#	%	#	%	#	%	Total
Attala	3,764	43.29%	4,931	56.71%	-1,167	-13.42%	8,695
Bolivar	9,132	67.65%	4,367	32.35%	4,765	35.30%	13,499
Carroll	1,923	34.31%	3,681	65.69%	-1,758	-31.37%	5,604
Claiborne	3,854	87.08%	572	12.92%	3,282	74.15%	4,426
Coahoma	6,127	73.87%	2,167	26.13%	3,960	47.75%	8,294
Copiah	6,710	53.01%	5,947	46.99%	763	6.03%	12,657
Grenada	5,099	47.67%	5,597	52.33%	-498	-4.66%	10,696
Hinds (part)	66,151	77.31%	19,418	22.69%	46,733	54.61%	85,569
Holmes	6,671	84.23%	1,249	15.77%	5,422	68.46%	7,920
Humphreys	3,095	75.76%	990	24.24%	2,105	51.53%	4,085
Issaquena	368	55.51%	295	44.49%	73	11.01%	663
Jefferson	3,368	87.21%	494	12.79%	2,874	74.42%	3,862
Leake	4,031	44.77%	4,973	55.23%	-942	-10.46%	9,004
Leflore	7,749	72.35%	2,961	27.65%	4,788	44.71%	10,710
Madison (part)	9,477	78.58%	2,583	21.42%	6,894	57.16%	12,060
Montgomery	2,283	45.60%	2,724	54.40%	-441	-8.81%	5,007
Panola	7,800	50.24%	7,727	49.76%	73	0.47%	15,527
Quitman	2,215	70.63%	921	29.37%	1,294	41.26%	3,136
Sharkey	1,513	71.40%	606	28.60%	907	42.80%	2,119
Sunflower	6,961	73.19%	2,550	26.81%	4,411	46.38%	9,511
Tallahatchie	3,378	60.79%	2,179	39.21%	1,199	21.58%	5,557
Tunica	2,615	75.82%	834	24.18%	1,781	51.64%	3,449
Warren	10,396	50.28%	10,280	49.72%	116	0.56%	20,676
Washington	12,965	72.49%	4,919	27.51%	8,046	44.99%	17,884
Yalobusha	2,975	45.97%	3,496	54.03%	-521	-8.05%	6,471
Yazoo	5,604	55.20%	4,549	44.80%	1,055	10.39%	10,153
Totals	196,224	66.02%	101,010	33.98%	95,214	32.03%	297,234

== District 3 ==
2020 Mississippi's 3rd congressional district election

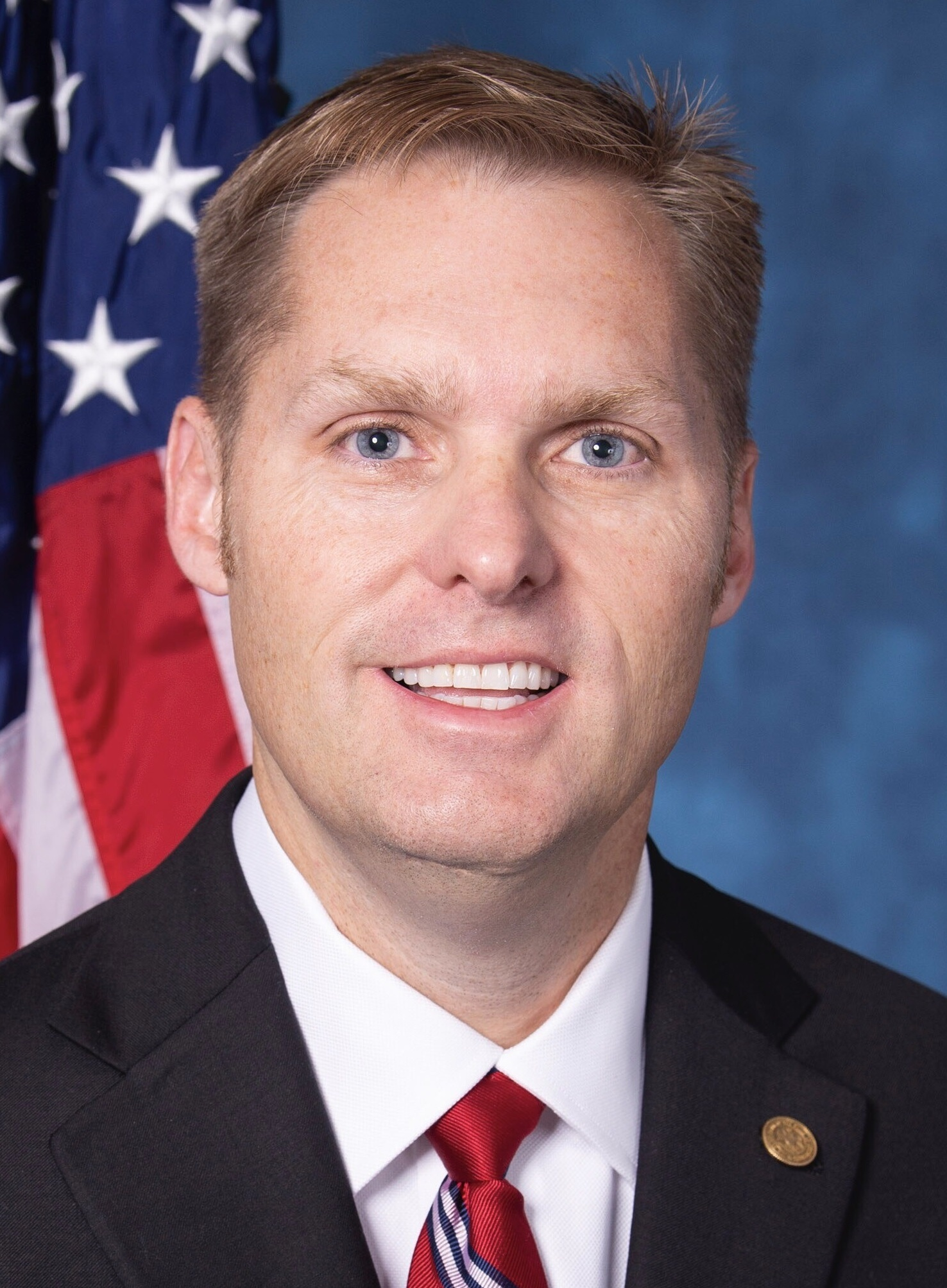

Nominee	Michael Guest	Dorothy Benford
Party	Republican	Democratic
Popular vote	221,064	120,782
Percentage	64.7%	35.3%
- Guest: 50–60% 60–70% 70–80% 80–90% >90% Benford: 50–60% 60–70% 70–80% 80–90% >90% Tie: 50% No votes
U.S. Representative before election
Michael Guest
Republican
Elected U.S. Representative
Michael Guest
Republican

The 3rd district is located in eastern and southwestern Mississippi, taking in Meridian, Starkville, Pearl, Brookhaven, Natchez, and most of the wealthier portions of Jackson, including the portion of the city located in Rankin County. The incumbent was Republican Michael Guest, who was elected with 62.3% of the vote in 2018.

=== Republican primary ===
==== Candidates ====
===== Declared =====
- Michael Guest, incumbent U.S. representative
- James Tulp, radio broadcaster

==== Primary results ====
2020 Mississippi's 3rd congressional district Republican primary results by county Guest: Guest—≥90%; Guest—80–90%; Guest—70–80%

Republican primary results
Party	Candidate	Votes	%
Republican	Michael Guest (incumbent)	67,269	89.8
Republican	James Tulp	7,618	10.2
Total votes		74,887	100.0%

=== Democratic primary ===
==== Candidates ====
===== Declared =====
- Dorothy "Dot" Benford, activist
- Katelyn Lee, veterinary medical technologist

==== Primary results ====
2020 Mississippi's 3rd congressional district Democratic primary results by county Benford: Benford—70–80%; Benford—60–70%; Benford—50–60%

Democratic primary results
Party	Candidate	Votes	%
Democratic	Dorothy "Dot" Benford	38,967	64.0
Democratic	Katelyn Lee	21,951	36.0
Total votes		60,918	100.0%

=== General election ===
==== Predictions ====
Source	Ranking	As of
The Cook Political Report	Safe R	July 2, 2020
Inside Elections	Safe R	June 2, 2020
Sabato's Crystal Ball	Safe R	July 2, 2020
Politico	Safe R	April 19, 2020
Daily Kos	Safe R	June 3, 2020
RCP	Safe R	June 9, 2020
Niskanen	Safe R	June 7, 2020

==== Results ====
2020 Mississippi's 3rd congressional district election
Party	Candidate	Votes	%
Republican	Michael Guest (incumbent)	221,064	64.7
Democratic	Dorothy "Dot" Benford	120,782	35.3
Total votes		341,846	100.0
Republican hold			

==== By county ====
County	Michael Guest Republican		Dorothy Benford Democratic		Margin		Total
County	#	%	#	%	#	%	Total
Adams	5,802	45.36%	6,990	54.64%	-1,188	-9.29%	12,792
Amite	4,417	63.66%	2,521	36.34%	1,896	27.33%	6,938
Clarke (part)	5,033	71.12%	2,044	28.88%	2,989	42.24%	7,077
Covington	5,836	65.09%	3,130	34.91%	2,706	30.18%	8,966
Franklin	2,876	67.40%	1,391	32.60%	1,485	34.80%	4,267
Hinds (part)	7,566	52.89%	6,740	47.11%	826	5.77%	14,306
Jasper	4,344	52.16%	3,984	47.84%	360	4.32%	8,328
Jefferson Davis	2,566	43.32%	3,357	56.68%	-791	-13.35%	5,923
Kemper	1,928	42.61%	2,597	57.39%	-669	-14.78%	4,525
Lauderdale	18,711	60.72%	12,103	39.28%	6,608	21.44%	30,814
Lawrence	4,299	67.89%	2,033	32.11%	2,266	35.79%	6,332
Lincoln	11,751	72.15%	4,536	27.85%	7,215	44.30%	16,287
Madison (part)	31,172	70.85%	12,824	29.15%	18,348	41.70%	43,996
Neshoba	8,592	74.15%	2,995	25.85%	5,597	48.30%	11,587
Newton	7,201	71.16%	2,918	28.84%	4,283	42.33%	10,119
Noxubee	1,282	26.41%	3,572	73.59%	-2,290	-47.18%	4,854
Oktibbeha (part)	8,932	51.85%	8,293	48.15%	639	3.71%	17,225
Pike	8,674	52.13%	7,964	47.87%	710	4.27%	16,638
Rankin	54,043	76.80%	16,326	23.20%	37,717	53.60%	70,369
Scott	6,341	60.95%	4,063	39.05%	2,278	21.90%	10,404
Simpson	7,798	68.22%	3,633	31.78%	4,165	36.44%	11,431
Smith	6,417	79.53%	1,652	20.47%	4,765	59.05%	8,069
Walthall	4,136	61.40%	2,600	38.60%	1,536	22.80%	6,736
Wilkinson	1,347	34.87%	2,516	65.13%	-1,169	-30.26%	3,863
Totals	221,064	64.67%	120,782	35.33%	100,282	29.34%	341,846

== District 4 ==
2020 Mississippi's 4th congressional district election

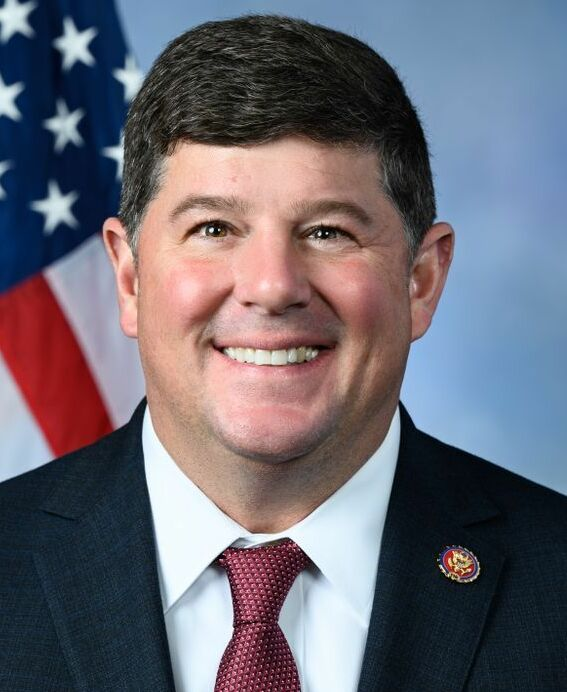
Nominee	Steven Palazzo
Party	Republican
Popular vote	255,971
Percentage	100.0%
- Palazzo: >90%
U.S. Representative before election
Steven Palazzo
Republican
Elected U.S. Representative
Steven Palazzo
Republican

The 4th district encompasses the Mississippi Gulf Coast, including Gulfport, Biloxi, Hattiesburg, Bay St. Louis, Laurel, and Pascagoula. The incumbent was Republican Steven Palazzo, who was elected with 68.2% of the vote in 2018.

=== Republican primary ===
==== Candidates ====
===== Declared =====
- Carl Boyanton, businessman
- Robert Deming, Biloxi city councilman
- Samuel Hickman, former staffer for U.S. Representative Trent Kelly
- Steven Palazzo, incumbent U.S. representative

==== Primary results ====
2020 Mississippi's 4th congressional district Republican primary results by county Palazzo: Palazzo—80–90%; Palazzo—70–80%; Palazzo—60–70%; Palazzo—50–60%

Republican primary results
Party	Candidate	Votes	%
Republican	Steven Palazzo (incumbent)	54,318	66.8
Republican	Robert Deming	11,463	14.1
Republican	Samuel Hickman	7,981	9.8
Republican	Carl Boyanton	7,533	9.3
Total votes		81,295	100.0%

=== General election ===
==== Predictions ====
Source	Ranking	As of
The Cook Political Report	Safe R	July 2, 2020
Inside Elections	Safe R	June 2, 2020
Sabato's Crystal Ball	Safe R	July 2, 2020
Politico	Safe R	April 19, 2020
Daily Kos	Safe R	June 3, 2020
RCP	Safe R	June 9, 2020
Niskanen	Safe R	June 7, 2020

==== Results ====
2020 Mississippi's 4th congressional district election
Party	Candidate	Votes	%
Republican	Steven Palazzo (incumbent)	255,971	100.0
Total votes		255,971	100.0
Republican hold			
