= NASA Authorization Act of 2014 =

US House bill on aerospace science

- Announced in: the 113th United States Congress
- Sponsored by: Rep. Steven M. Palazzo (R, MS-4)
- Number of co-sponsors: 1

Codification
- Acts affected: NASA Authorization Act of 2010, NASA Authorization Act of 2005, Ethics in Government Act of 1978, National Aeronautics and Space Administration Authorization Act of 1988, Land Remote Sensing Policy Act of 1992, and others.
- U.S.C. sections affected: 42 U.S.C. § 18322, 42 U.S.C. § 18323, 51 U.S.C. § 70504, 51 U.S.C. § 20102, 51 U.S.C. ch. 201, and others.
- Agencies affected: National Aeronautics and Space Administration, National Science Foundation, Government Accountability Office, Federal Aviation Administration, United States National Security Council, National Oceanic and Atmospheric Administration, Executive Office of the President, United States Congress, United States Department of Energy, Office of Science and Technology Policy, United States Department of Defense, Department of Homeland Security
- Authorizations of appropriations: $17,646,500,000 in fiscal year 2014.

Legislative history
- Introduced in the House as H.R. 4412 by Rep. Steven M. Palazzo (R, MS-4) on April 7, 2014; Committee consideration by United States House Committee on Science, Space and Technology, United States House Science Subcommittee on Space; Passed the House on June 9, 2014 (Roll Call Vote 272: 401-2)

The NASA Authorization Act of 2014 (H.R. 4412) is a bill that would authorize the appropriation of $17.6 billion in fiscal year 2014 to the National Aeronautics and Space Administration (NASA). NASA would use the funding for human exploration of space, the Space Launch System, the Orion spacecraft, the Commercial Crew Program, the International Space Station (ISS), and various technological and educational projects.

The bill was introduced and passed in the United States House of Representatives during the 113th United States Congress.

== Background ==
NASA logo

NASA is the agency of the United States government that is responsible for the nation's civilian space program and for aeronautics and aerospace research.

President Dwight D. Eisenhower established the National Aeronautics and Space Administration (NASA) in 1958 with a distinctly civilian (rather than military) orientation encouraging peaceful applications in space science. The new agency became operational on October 1, 1958. Since that time, most U.S. space exploration efforts have been led by NASA, including the Apollo Moon landing missions, the Skylab space station, and later the Space Shuttle. Currently, NASA is supporting the International Space Station and is overseeing the development of the Orion spacecraft, the Space Launch System and Commercial Crew vehicles. The agency is also responsible for the Launch Services Program (LSP) which provides oversight of launch operations and countdown management for unmanned NASA launches.

NASA science is focused on better understanding Earth through the Earth Observing System, advancing heliophysics through the efforts of the Science Mission Directorate's Heliophysics Research Program, exploring bodies throughout the Solar System with advanced robotic missions such as New Horizons, and researching astrophysics topics, such as the Big Bang, through the Great Observatories and associated programs. NASA shares data with various national and international organizations such as from the Greenhouse Gases Observing Satellite.

== Provisions of the bill ==
This summary is based largely on the summary provided by the Congressional Research Service, a public domain source.

The National Aeronautics and Space Administration Authorization Act of 2014 would authorize appropriations for FY2014 for the National Aeronautics and Space Administration (NASA).

The bill would authorize programs, activities, and reports respecting NASA, including those with regard to human exploration of space, the Space Launch System, the Orion spacecraft, the Commercial Crew Program, the International Space Station (ISS), radioisotope thermoelectric generators, extrasolar planet exploration, the James Webb Space Telescope, the Wide-Field Infrared Survey Telescope, Near-Earth objects, space weather, the Deep Space Climate Observatory, land imaging remote sensing data, aeronautics research, science, technology, engineering, and mathematics (STEM) education, project and program reserves, and orbital debris mitigation.

The bill would reaffirm the importance of the Aerospace Safety Advisory Panel.

The bill would direct the NASA Administrator to utilize the International Space Station and commercial services for Science Mission Directorate and Space Technology Demonstration missions in low-Earth orbit wherever it is practical and cost effective to do so.

The bill would establish a space technology program.

The bill would direct the Administrator to: (1) enter into an arrangement with the National Academies for a review of the National Space Grant College and Fellowship Program, and (2) revise the NASA Supplement to the Federal Acquisition Regulation to address the detection and avoidance of counterfeit electronic parts.

=== Funding details ===
- $3 billion is authorized to be spent on the International Space Station.
- $658 million is authorized to be spent on the James Webb Space Telescope.

== Congressional Budget Office report ==
This summary is based largely on the summary provided by the Congressional Budget Office, as ordered reported by the House Committee on Science, Space, and Technology on April 29, 2014. This is a public domain source.

H.R. 4412 would authorize the appropriation of about $17.6 billion for 2014 for activities of the National Aeronautics and Space Administration (NASA). The amount appropriated to NASA for 2014 is also about $17.6 billion. For the purpose of this estimate, the Congressional Budget Office (CBO) assumes that no further appropriations will be provided to NASA for fiscal year 2014 and we therefore estimate that no additional discretionary costs would result from enacting H.R. 4412.

The CBO estimates that enacting H.R. 4412 would increase direct spending by adding about $600 million over the 2015-2024 period to outlays for certain NASA contracts. Because the legislation would increase direct spending, pay-as-you-go procedures apply. Enacting the legislation would not affect revenues.

H.R. 4412 contains no intergovernmental or private-sector mandates as defined in the Unfunded Mandates Reform Act.

== Procedural history ==
The National Aeronautics and Space Administration Authorization Act of 2014 was introduced into the United States House of Representatives on April 7, 2014 by Rep. Steven M. Palazzo (R, MS-4). It was referred to the United States House Committee on Science, Space and Technology and the United States House Science Subcommittee on Space. On June 5, 2014 it was reported (amended) alongside Report 113-470. The House voted on June 9, 2014 in Roll Call vote 272 to pass the bill 401-2.

== Debate and discussion ==
Rep. Lamar Smith (R-TX), the Chairman of the House Science, Space and Technology Committee, supported the bill, saying that "this bill provides the necessary funds to push us into the Cosmos and beyond."

Rep. Steven Palazzo (R-MS), who introduced the bill, said that "American leadership in space depends on our ability to put people and sound policy ahead of politics."

Rep. Eddie Bernice Johnson (D-TX) praised the bipartisan nature of the bill, arguing that it had been significantly improved over earlier partisan drafts from 2013.

The bill included a provision that stops NASA from spending any money on the Asteroid Redirect Mission, instead requiring NASA to report to Congress about expected costs and schedule for that mission.

== See also ==
- List of bills in the 113th United States Congress
- CHIPS and Science Act, the latest NASA authorizations bill, passed in 2022
