= Mississippi's congressional districts =

Political subdivisions in the United States of America

Map of Mississippi's congressional districts since 2023 Interactive map version

Mississippi is currently divided into four congressional districts, each represented by a member of the United States House of Representatives. After the 2020 census, the number of Mississippi's seats remained unchanged.

== Current districts and representatives ==
This is a list of United States representatives from Mississippi, their terms, their district boundaries, and the district political ratings according to the CPVI. The delegation has a total of four members, including three Republicans and one Democrat.

Current U.S. representatives from Mississippi
District	Member (Residence)	Party	Incumbent since	CPVI (2025)	District map
1st	Trent Kelly (Saltillo)	Republican	June 2, 2015	R+18	
2nd	Bennie Thompson (Bolton)	Democratic	April 13, 1993	D+11	
3rd	Michael Guest (Brandon)	Republican	January 3, 2019	R+14	
4th	Mike Ezell (Pascagoula)	Republican	January 3, 2023	R+21	

== Apportionment history ==
From 1789 to 1817, the Mississippi Territory was represented in Congress by a non-voting delegate. Since becoming a state on December 10, 1817, Mississippi has sent between one and eight representatives to Congress.

1817 ^{1}	1820	1830	1840	1850	1860	1870	1880	1890
1	1	2	4	5	5	6	7	7

1900	1910	1920	1930	1940	1950	1960	1970	1980	1990
8	8	8	7	7	6	5	5	5	5

2000	2010	2020
4	4	4

1. Mississippi was granted statehood on December 10, 1817.

== Historical and present district boundaries ==
Table of United States congressional district boundary maps in the State of Mississippi, presented chronologically. All redistricting events that took place in Mississippi between 1973 and 2013 are shown.

Year	Statewide map	Jackson highlight
1973–1982		
1983–1984		
1985–1992		
1993–2002		
2003–2013		
2013–2023		
2023–present		

== Obsolete districts ==
=== At-large district ===
Mississippi's at-large congressional district existed from the granting of statehood in 1817 to 1847 and again from 1853 to 1855.

=== 5th district ===
The fifth congressional district was created after the 1850 census and abolished following the 2000 census.

=== 6th district ===
The sixth congressional district was created after the 1870 census and abolished following the 1960 census.

=== 7th district ===
The seventh congressional district was created after the 1880 census and abolished following the 1950 census.

=== 8th district ===
The eighth congressional district was created after the 1900 census and abolished following the 1930 census.

== See also ==
- List of United States congressional districts
