= Steven Palazzo =

American politician (born 1970)

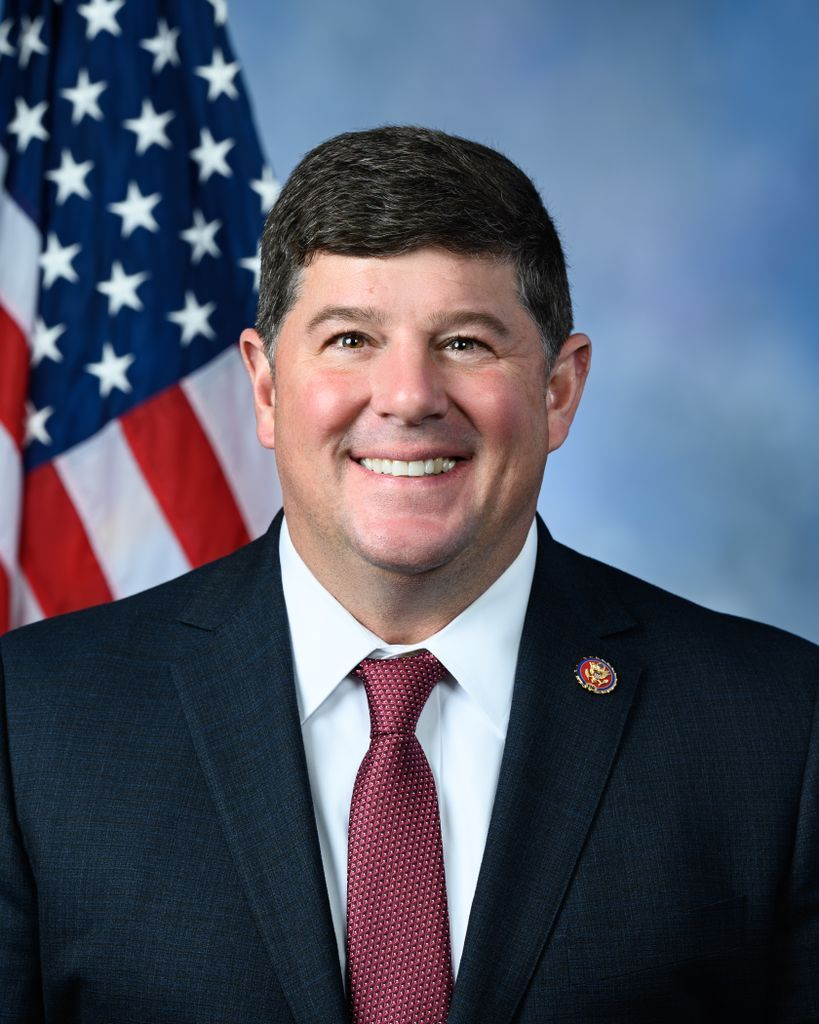
- Official portrait, 2021

Member of the U.S. House of Representatives from Mississippi's 4th district
- In office January 3, 2011 – January 3, 2023
- Preceded by: Gene Taylor
- Succeeded by: Mike Ezell

Member of the Mississippi House of Representatives from the 116th district
- In office December 14, 2006 – January 3, 2011
- Preceded by: Leonard Bentz
- Succeeded by: Casey Eure

Personal details
- Born: Steven McCarty Palazzo; February 21, 1970 (age 56) Gulfport, Mississippi, U.S.
- Party: Republican
- Spouse: Lisa Belvin (m. 1996; div. 2016)
- Children: 3
- Education: University of Southern Mississippi (BA, MPA)

Military service
- Branch/service: United States Marine Corps; United States Army
- Years of service: 1989–1996 (reserve); 1997–present (National Guard)
- Rank: Sergeant
- Unit: United States Marine Corps Reserve; Mississippi Army National Guard
- Battles/wars: Gulf War

Steven McCarty Palazzo (/pəˈlɑːzoʊ/ pə-LAH-zoh; born February 21, 1970) is an American politician who served as the U.S. representative for Mississippi's 4th congressional district from 2011 to 2023. The district included Mississippi's Gulf Coast, Biloxi, Gulfport, Pascagoula, Laurel and Hattiesburg. Palazzo is a member of the Republican Party.

Palazzo defeated 10-term Democratic incumbent Gene Taylor, 52%-47%, in 2010. He represented District 116 in the Mississippi House of Representatives from 2006 to 2011. In 2016, Palazzo was one of two Mississippi Congressmen to endorse President Donald by name. In 2022, Palazzo was endorsed by President Donald Trump during his 2020 election. Palazzo lost renomination to Mike Ezell in the June 28, 2022, Republican primary.

== Early life, education, and military service ==
Palazzo was born on February 21, 1970, in Gulfport. He graduated from Saint John High School in 1988.

Palazzo enlisted in the Marine Corps Reserve in 1988, and served with the 3rd Force Reconnaissance Company in the Persian Gulf War. He now serves in the Mississippi Army National Guard. He received a Bachelor's of business administration and MPA in public accountancy from the University of Southern Mississippi, and is a member of the Sigma Chi fraternity. He is a Certified Public Accountant.

== Mississippi House of Representatives ==
=== Elections ===
In April 2006, incumbent Republican State Representative Leonard Bentz of Mississippi's 116th House District resigned because he was appointed to the Mississippi Public Service Commission. Palazzo sought election to the vacated seat, defeating Democratic candidate Maryann Graczyk, an education lobbyist, and Republican George Emile, a funeral home director, 51%–26%–24%. In 2007, running unopposed, he was elected to a full term.

=== Committee assignments ===
Palazzo served on the Banking and Financial Services, Juvenile Justice, Labor, Select Committee on the Gulf Coast Disaster, and the Wildlife, Fisheries and Parks Committees.

== U.S. House of Representatives ==
=== Elections ===
==== 2010 ====
Palazzo entered the Republican primary for Mississippi's 4th congressional district and won the nomination with 57% of the vote. He faced 10-term Democratic incumbent Gene Taylor in the general election. Although the 4th district had turned almost solidly Republican at the federal level, Taylor had held the seat without serious difficulty since 1996. His voting record had been very conservative even by Mississippi Democratic standards, and he had often broken with his party. Palazzo established himself as Taylor's strongest opponent since 1996. In particular, he attacked Taylor for supporting Nancy Pelosi for House Speaker in 2006 and 2008. He was endorsed by Sarah Palin and defeated Taylor, 52%–47%.

Mississippi's 4th congressional district general election, 2010
Party	Candidate	Votes	%
Republican	Steven Palazzo	105,613	51.93
Democratic	Gene Taylor (incumbent)	95,243	46.83
Libertarian	Tim Hampton	1,741	0.86
Reform	Anna Jewel Revies	787	0.39
Total votes		203,384	100.00

==== 2012 ====
In the Republican primary, Palazzo defeated two challengers with 74% of the vote. In the general election, he defeated Democratic nominee Matthew Moore, 64%–29%.

Mississippi's 4th congressional district, 2012
Party	Candidate	Votes	%
Republican	Steven Palazzo (incumbent)	182,998	64.1
Democratic	Matt Moore	82,344	28.9
Libertarian	Ron Williams	17,982	6.3
Reform	Robert Claunch	2,108	0.7
Total votes		285,432	100.0
Republican hold			

==== 2014 ====
In the Republican primary, Palazzo faced his predecessor, Taylor, and three other challengers. Taylor switched parties in a bid to return to his former seat, actively campaigning and drawing large numbers of Democrats into the Republican primary. Palazzo was targeted by the Club for Growth. Palazzo won 50.5% of the vote to Taylor's 43%, just enough to avoid a runoff.

In the general election, Palazzo easily defeated his 2012 general-election opponent, Matt Moore, 69.9% to 24.3%; four minor party or independent candidates received 3.8% of the vote.

Mississippi's 4th congressional district, 2014
Party	Candidate	Votes	%
Republican	Steven Palazzo (incumbent)	108,776	69.9
Democratic	Matt Moore	37,869	24.3
Independent	Cindy Burleson	3,684	2.4
Libertarian	Joey Robinson	3,473	2.2
Reform	Eli Jackson	917	0.6
Independent	Ed Reich	857	0.6
Total votes		155,576	100.0
Republican hold			

==== 2016 ====
In the Republican primary, Palazzo ran unopposed for the first time in his political career. In the general election, Palazzo won 65.2% of the vote, defeating Democratic nominee Mark Gladney and two minor candidates.

Mississippi's 4th congressional district, 2016
Party	Candidate	Votes	%
Republican	Steven Palazzo (incumbent)	181,323	65.0
Democratic	Mark Gladney	77,505	27.8
Libertarian	Richard Blake McCluskey	14,687	5.3
Reform	Shawn O'Hara	5,264	1.9
Total votes		278,779	100.0
Republican hold			

==== 2018 ====
In the June 5 Republican primary, Palazzo defeated E. Brian Rose, 70.5% to 29.5%. He won the general election over Democratic state Representative Jeramey Anderson, 68.2% to 30.7%, with Lajena Sheets of the Reform Party taking 1% of the vote.

Mississippi's 4th congressional district, 2018
Party	Candidate	Votes	%
Republican	Steven Palazzo (incumbent)	152,633	68.2
Democratic	Jeramey Anderson	68,787	30.8
Reform	Lajena Sheets	2,312	1.0
Total votes		223,732	100.0
Republican hold			

==== 2020 ====
In the June 3 primary, Palazzo ran against Robert Deming, Samuel Hickman and Carl Boyanton. He won with 66.8% of the vote, with Deming finishing second with 14.1%. He was unopposed in the general election for the first time in his career.

Mississippi's 4th congressional district, 2020
Party	Candidate	Votes	%
Republican	Steven Palazzo (incumbent)	255,971	100.0
Total votes		255,971	100.0
Republican hold			

==== 2022 ====
Palazzo lost renomination to Mike Ezell in the June 28, 2022, Republican primary.

=== Tenure ===
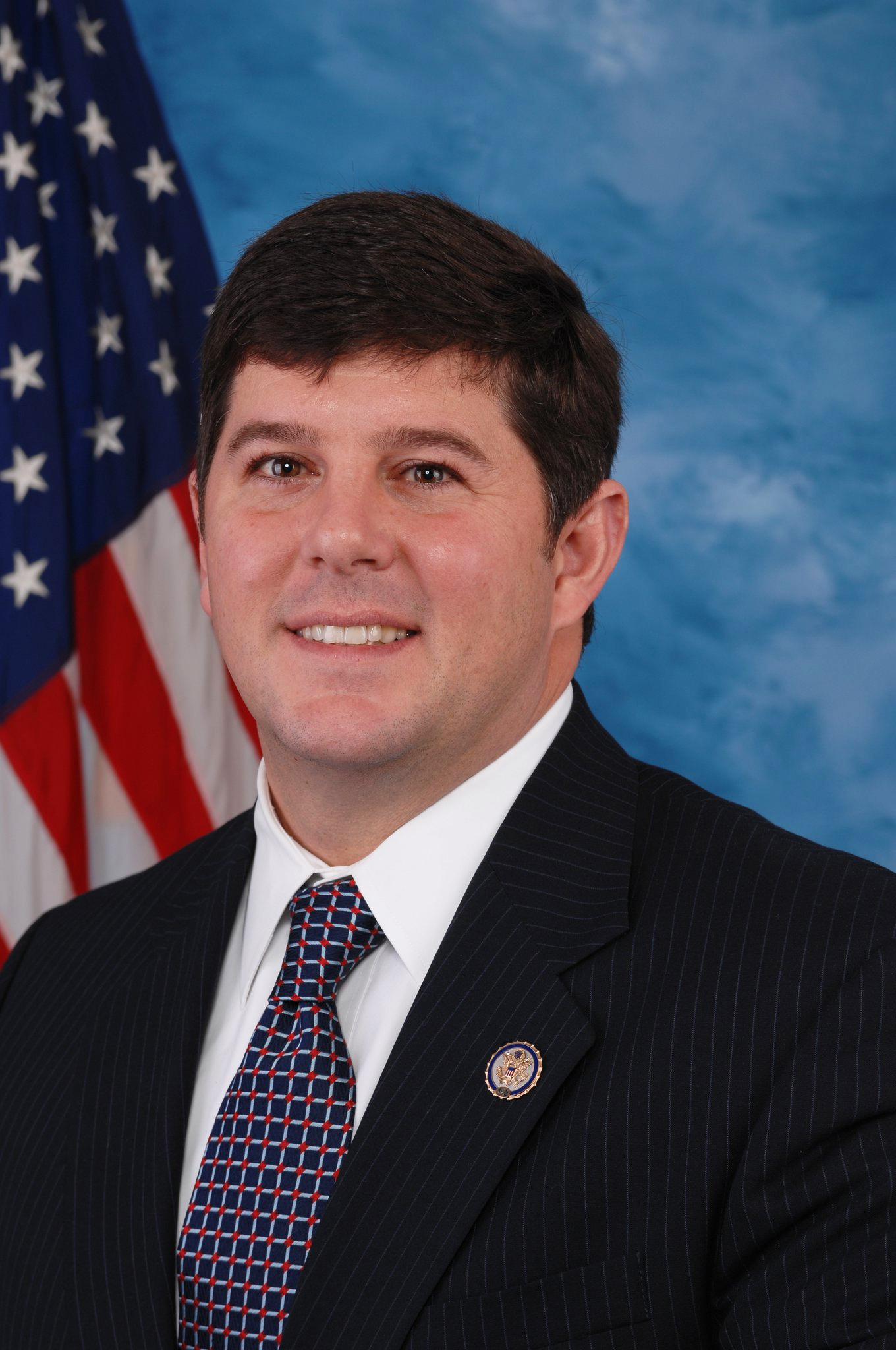
Palazzo during the 112th Congress

Palazzo voted with his Republican colleagues to pass a balanced budget amendment and repeal the Patient Protection and Affordable Care Act.

In 2013, Palazzo was recognized when he opened the barricades and escorted 91 veterans to access World War II Memorial in Washington, D.C. during the government shutdown.

In 2015, Palazzo cosponsored a resolution to amend the Constitution to ban same-sex marriage. He also condemned the Supreme Court's ruling in Obergefell v. Hodges, which held that same-sex marriage bans violated the constitution.

In February 2017, Palazzo began to face calls from constituents to attend town halls. One on the Gulf Coast in Long Beach was organized. A similar meeting was organized in Hattiesburg. Palazzo did not attend either.

In 2018, Palazzo defended the Trump administration's policy of separating small children from immigrant parents by blaming it on Democratic administrations. "Overall, it’s a terrible, sad situation that unfortunately has been created by years of liberal policies that lead illegal immigrants to believe they can freely stroll through our borders. There is no law requiring separation of families at the border. In April, Attorney General Sessions implemented a zero-tolerance policy that mandates that each person caught illegally crossing the U.S. border be criminally prosecuted. I stand firmly behind that policy." He continued, "this separation of families is the adverse effect created by a past liberal policy", and "I will not allow the Democrats and liberal media to use this issue to push amnesty or other unsafe immigration policies down the throats of the American people."

In December 2020, Palazzo was one of 126 Republican members of the House of Representatives to sign an amicus brief in support of Texas v. Pennsylvania, a lawsuit filed at the United States Supreme Court contesting the results of the 2020 presidential election, in which Joe Biden defeated incumbent Donald Trump. The Supreme Court declined to hear the case on the basis that Texas lacked standing under Article III of the Constitution to challenge the results of an election held by another state.

On November 30, 2021, Palazzo was the lone Mississippi House Republican to vote for of H.R. 550: Immunization Infrastructure Modernization Act of 2021. The bill helps create confidential, population-based databases that maintain a record of vaccine administrations.

Palazzo sponsored H.R. 6202, the American Tech Workforce Act of 2021, introduced by Representative Jim Banks. The legislation would establish a wage floor for the high-skill H-1B visa program, thereby significantly reducing employer dependence on the program. The bill would also eliminate the Optional Practical Training program that allows foreign graduates to stay and work in the United States.

During his 12 years in Congress, Palazzo has served on a number of committees during his tenure, most recently on the House Appropriations Committee and the Homeland Security and Commerce, Justice and Science subcommittees. He was also is co-chair of the National Guard Caucus.

=== Legislation ===
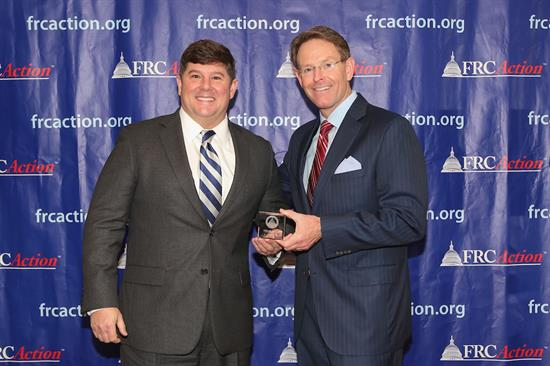
Palazzo receiving the True Blue award from FRC President Tony Perkins

Palazzo was one of the initial co-sponsors of the Social Media Working Group Act of 2014 (H.R. 4263; 113th Congress), a bill that would direct the United States Secretary of Homeland Security to establish within the United States Department of Homeland Security (DHS) a social media working group (the Group) to provide guidance and best practices to the emergency preparedness and response community on the use of social media technologies before, during, and after a terrorist attack. Palazzo said, "social media has played a crucial role in emergency preparedness and response in Mississippi, including during disasters like Hurricane Isaac and the tornadoes that hit the Hattiesburg area a little over a year ago." He said the bill's goal was to "build upon existing public-private partnerships and use social media in a more strategic way in order to help save lives and property."

On April 7, 2014, Palazzo introduced the National Aeronautics and Space Administration Authorization Act of 2014 (H.R. 4412; 113th Congress), a bill that would authorize the appropriation of $17.6 billion in fiscal year 2014 to the National Aeronautics and Space Administration (NASA). NASA would use the funding for human exploration of space, the Space Launch System, the Orion multipurpose crew vehicle, the commercial crew program, the International Space Station (ISS), and various technological and educational projects. Palazzo said, "American leadership in space depends on our ability to put people and sound policy ahead of politics."

In 2017, Palazzo announced a significant $3.4 million federal grant for noise mitigation measures at Gulfport-Biloxi International Airport. This grant aimed to reduce noise pollution in nearby residential areas while improving the airport's operations. The initiative was part of broader efforts to modernize Mississippi's airport infrastructure and enhance passenger and community experiences.

With the Trump administration at an impasse regarding appropriations for border security, Palazzo proposed his own border wall funding solution in December 2018. Under his Border Bonds for America Act, individual American citizens would fund the costs of building a wall on the southern border by buying revenue bonds from the U.S. Treasury. His bill drew little support, dying before the new Democratic House majority was sworn in in January 2019.

In May 2022, Palazzo, alongside other Mississippi lawmakers, helped secure more than $15 million in Federal Aviation Administration (FAA) Airport Improvement Program (AIP) grants. These funds were distributed to 29 airfields across the state, enabling a variety of enhancement projects that supported both safety and operational improvements at regional airports.

In January 2022, Palazzo participated in the ribbon-cutting ceremony for a new 24,000-square-foot hangar at the airport. The $5.24 million project, which was partially funded by a $1.85 million RESTORE grant, was designed to foster economic development in the region by supporting business operations and growth within the aviation sector.

=== Committee assignments ===
- Committee on Appropriations
  - Subcommittee on Commerce, Justice, Science, and Related Agencies
  - Subcommittee on Homeland Security

=== Caucus memberships ===
- U.S.-Japan Caucus
- Republican Study Committee

== Personal life ==
Palazzo is Roman Catholic.

== Controversy ==
Before the 2016 general election, Libertarian challenger Ric McCluskey accused Palazzo of not being truthful about his service in the National Guard, claiming Palazzo failed to show up for mandatory drills. Mississippi State Representative David Baria, a Democrat, sent the National Guard a letter asking them to look into Palazzo's hours of service. Baria said the Federal Bureau of Investigation (FBI) was investigating the claims. Palazzo denied the claims, saying, "This is a ridiculous accusation and a desperate attempt to smear a soldier’s service solely for political gain."

On August 3, 2017, Republican challenger E. Brian Rose presented documents he said raised questions about Palazzo's military service record. Rose claimed the documents revealed Palazzo fraudulently sought discharge from the National Guard based on false claims of financial, family, and community hardships. ABC affiliate WLOX verified Rose's documents, stating, "WLOX has verified through an independent source that the documents are authentic." Palazzo acknowledged the documents, saying, "Not once have I ever denied that I requested this waiver more than a decade ago", but called the revelation a "disgusting" attack on his family and his character.

In March 2020, the watchdog group Campaign Legal Center (CLC) asked the Office of Congressional Ethics (OCE) to investigate Palazzo for potentially violating campaign finance laws by "channel[ing] six figures of donors’ money to family-owned businesses."

U.S. House of Representatives
Preceded by Gene Taylor	Member of the U.S. House of Representatives from Mississippi's 4th congressional district 2011–2023	Succeeded by Mike Ezell
U.S. order of precedence (ceremonial)
Preceded by Chip Pickering as Former U.S. Representative	Order of precedence of the United States as Former U.S. Representative	Succeeded by Peter Roskam as Former U.S. Representative
