= Mike Ezell =

American politician (born 1959)

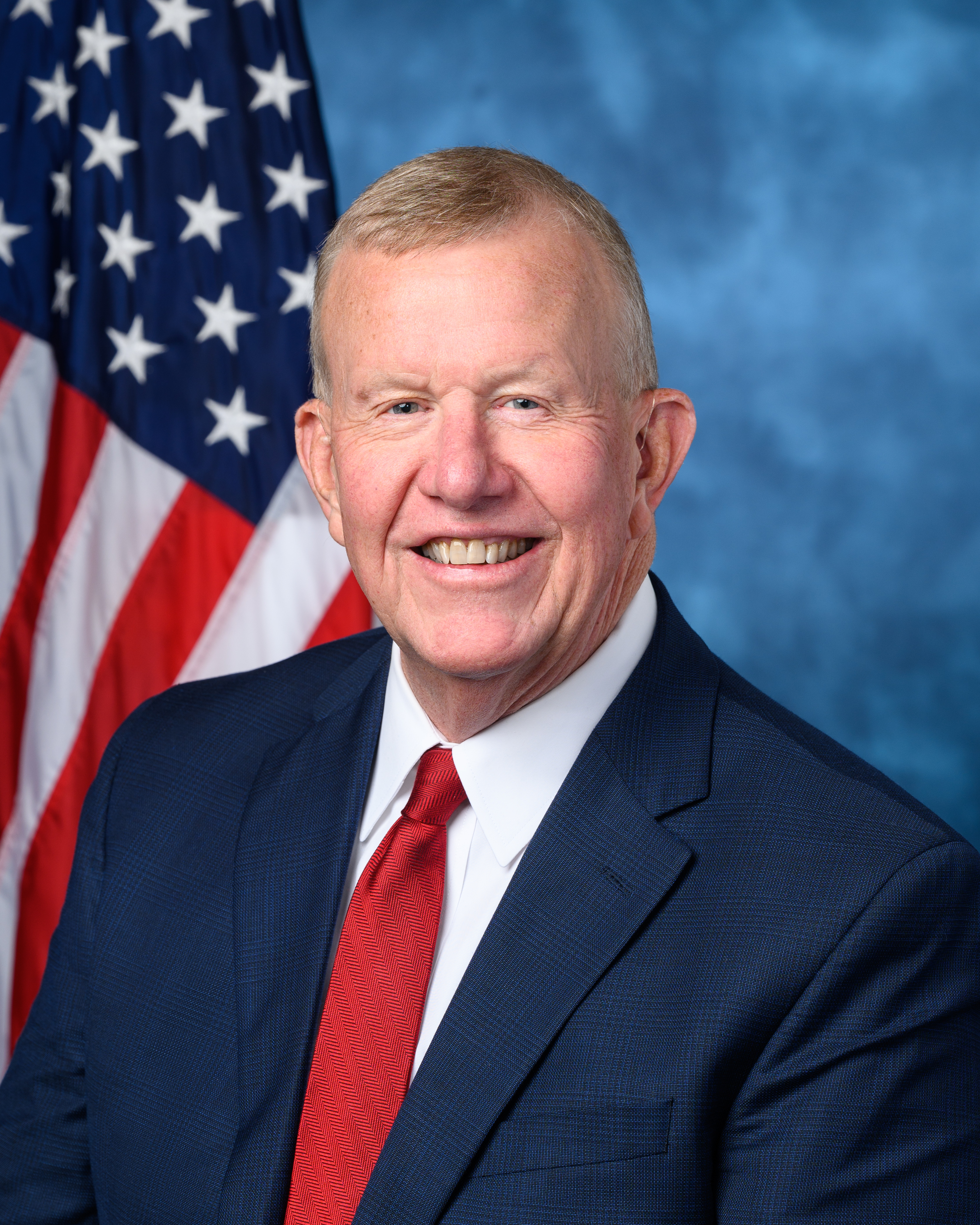
- Official portrait, 2023

Member of the U.S. House of Representatives from Mississippi's 4th district
- Incumbent
- Assumed office January 3, 2023
- Preceded by: Steven Palazzo

Sheriff of Jackson County
- In office December 1, 2014 – December 31, 2022
- Preceded by: Mike Byrd
- Succeeded by: John Ledbetter

Personal details
- Born: Walter Michael Ezell; April 6, 1959 (age 67) Pascagoula, Mississippi, U.S.
- Party: Republican
- Spouse: Suzette
- Children: 1
- Education: University of Southern Mississippi (BA)
- Website: House website Campaign website

Walter Michael Ezell (/ˈiˌzɛl/ EE-zel; born April 6, 1959) is an American former law enforcement officer and politician serving as the U.S. representative for Mississippi's 4th congressional district since 2023. A member of the Republican Party, he previously served as the sheriff of Jackson County from 2014 to 2022, where he focused on eliminating corruption and modernizing law enforcement operations.

A native of Pascagoula, Mississippi, Ezell earned a degree in criminal justice from the University of Southern Mississippi while attending night school. He began his law enforcement career in 1980 as a patrolman and later held leadership roles in the Pascagoula Police Department, the Ocean Springs Police Department, and the district attorney's office. After winning a special election for sheriff in 2014, he was twice re-elected before entering Congress.

Ezell defeated incumbent representative Steven Palazzo in the 2022 Republican primary runoff amid ethics concerns surrounding Palazzo's campaign finances. In Congress, he has focused on law enforcement funding, border security, and military support. He won re-election in 2024 by a wide margin and, for the 119th Congress, serves on the House Natural Resources and Transportation and Infrastructure Committees, chairing the Subcommittee on Coast Guard and Maritime Transportation.

== Early life and education ==
Ezell was born in Pascagoula, Mississippi on April 6, 1959, to S.H. "Buck" Ezell, a police officer, and Betty Ezell, secretary for the family church.

He graduated from Pascagoula High School in 1977. He attended the University of Southern Mississippi, graduating with a Bachelor of Science degree in criminal justice. He attended night school to earn his degree.

== Law enforcement career ==
Before becoming sheriff, Ezell served in law enforcement roles for over 35 years.

Ezell became a patrolman for the Osyka police department in 1980. He graduated from the Mississippi Law Enforcement Officers Training Academy in Pearl, MS in 1981 and eventually became a captain in the department. Ezell attended the FBI National Academy in 1990 and became the captain of the Pascagoula detective department in 1992; he worked with the FBI on their Safe Streets Task Force. He served as chief of the Ocean Springs Police Department from 1998 to 2000. He then served as Pascagoula School District's chief of law enforcement from 2003 to 2007. Afterward, he worked briefly in the district attorney's office and later as campus chief for the Singing River Health System.

The former Jackson County sheriff, Mike Byrd, was indicted and plead guilty to state and federal charges. As a result, Ezell, and several others ran in the 2014 special election; he received enough votes to head to the run-off, which he won with 64% of the vote. He won the general election in 2015 and ran uncontested in 2019. As sheriff, he worked to eliminate corruption, created a new training facility, and established a crime lab.

== U.S. House of Representatives ==
=== Elections ===
==== 2022 ====
In April 2021, Ezell announced that he would challenge Republican incumbent Steven Palazzo in Mississippi's 4th congressional district in the 2022 elections. Palazzo was considered vulnerable to losing his seat because an Office of Congressional Ethics report in 2021 alleged that he misused campaign funds. Palazzo was also criticized for his limited presence in the district, earning a nickname of "No-show Palazzo."

In the seven-way June 7 primary election, Palazzo received the most votes, 31.5%, and Ezell finished second with 25%. Because no candidate received 50% of the vote, Palazzo and Ezell faced each other in a runoff election. All the other candidates in the race endorsed Ezell after they were eliminated. It was Palazzo's first primary run-off election. Following the poor showing for an incumbent, Palazzo agreed to debate Ezell, the first debate in 12 years for Palazzo. The two traded attacked throughout the campaign, with Ezell describing Palazzo as a "career politician" while Palazzo called him inexperienced and a "career county employee." While Ezell received endorsements from his primary opponents, Palazzo received endorsements from the National Right to Life and Louisiana Representative Steve Scalise.

Ezell won the June 28 primary runoff election 54% to 46% and defeated Democratic nominee and former Hattiesburg mayor Johnny DuPree in the November general election.

==== 2024 ====
Ezell ran for reelection in 2024 and faced a primary challenge from businessman Carl Boyanton and Army veteran Michael McGill. Boyanton donated $500,000 of his own money into his campaign and criticized Ezell of joining "the swamp", voting for Kevin McCarthy 16 times for speaker, and supporting vaccine mandates. Ezell was endorsed by former President Donald Trump, as well as signed the Americans for Tax Reform pledge. Despite Ezell entering the final weeks of the campaign with less money than Boyanton, he prevailed by over 50 points in the primary. In the general election, he defeated Democrat Craig Rayborn, a truck driver and nonprofit director, with 74% to 26% of the vote.

=== Tenure ===
In the 118th Congress, Ezell sponsored 14 pieces of legislation and had House Resolution 106, which condemned efforts to defund police, pass the House; it was not taken up in the Senate. He cosponsored 220 pieces of legislation.

=== Committee assignments ===
For the 119th Congress:

- Committee on Natural Resources
  - Subcommittee on Energy and Mineral Resources
  - Subcommittee on Water, Wildlife and Fisheries (Vice Chair)
- Committee on Transportation and Infrastructure
  - Subcommittee on Coast Guard and Maritime Transportation (Chairman)
  - Subcommittee on Economic Development, Public Buildings, and Emergency Management

=== Controversies ===
On May 7, 2024, the Associated Press reported allegations that Congressman Mike Ezell assaulted an activist from CodePink as she asked about his support for a peace proposal for Gaza by slapping a cellular telephone from her hand as she was recording a confrontation with him.

== Political positions ==
While running for reelection in 2024, Ezell declared his support for further measures to protect first responders and increase military spending. He called for stronger border security, upholding "American family values," and supporting pro-life policies. He called for protection of Second Amendment gun rights.

He voiced support for the Jones Act during committee hearings he chaired about domestic ship building.

== Personal life ==
Ezell is married to Suzette Ezell. They have one daughter and one granddaughter.

Ezell is a Baptist and a member of First Baptist Church in Pascagoula, Mississippi.

U.S. House of Representatives
Preceded by Steven Palazzo	Member of the U.S. House of Representatives from Mississippi's 4th congressional district 2023–present	Incumbent
U.S. order of precedence (ceremonial)
Preceded by Chuck Edwards	United States representatives by seniority 306th	Succeeded by Valerie Foushee
