= Michael Guest (politician) =

American attorney and politician (born 1970)

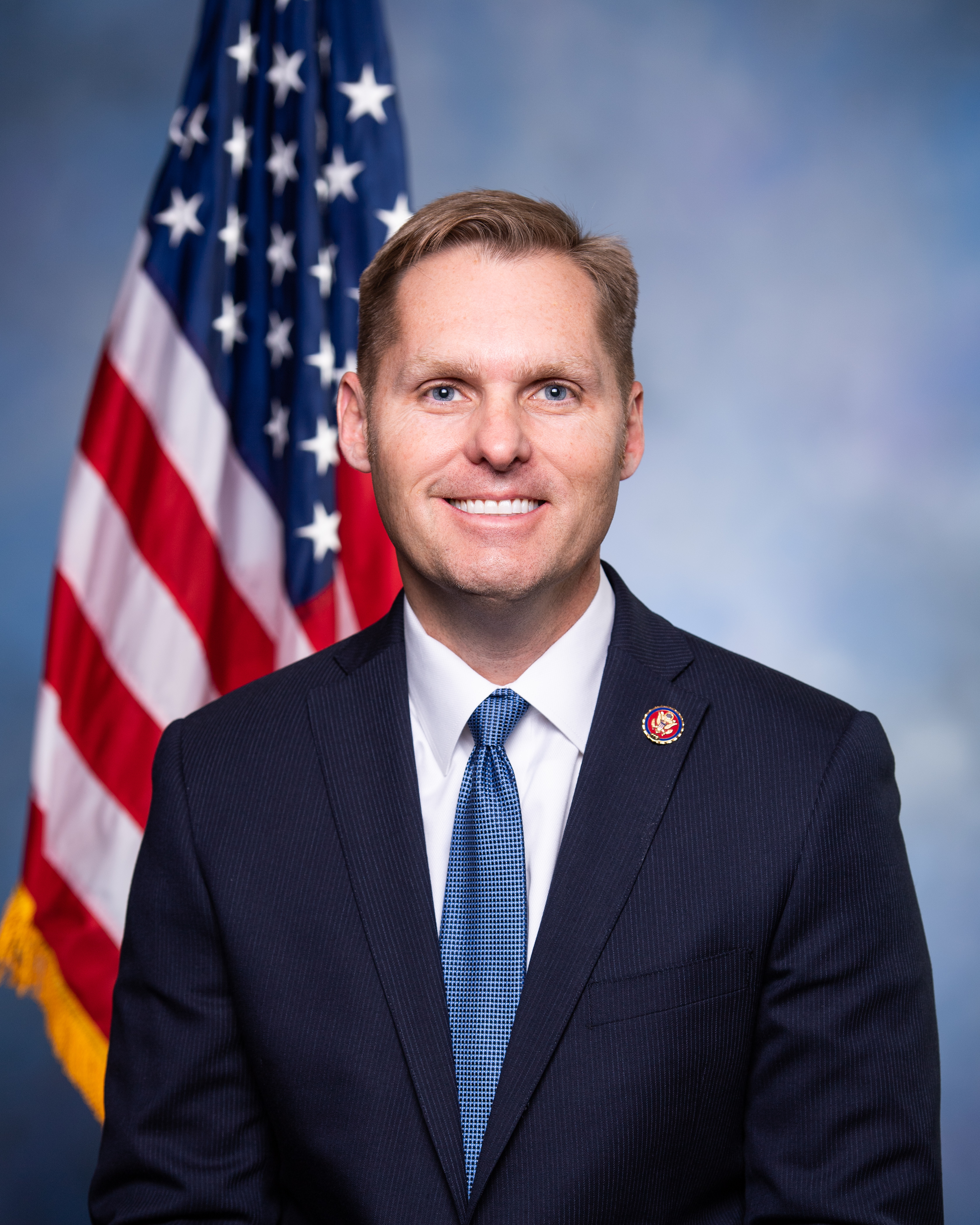
- Official portrait, 2019

Chair of the House Ethics Committee
- Incumbent
- Assumed office January 3, 2023
- Preceded by: Susan Wild

Ranking Member of the House Ethics Committee
- Acting
- In office August 19, 2022 – January 3, 2023
- Preceded by: Jackie Walorski
- Succeeded by: Susan Wild

Member of the U.S. House of Representatives from Mississippi's 3rd district
- Incumbent
- Assumed office January 3, 2019
- Preceded by: Gregg Harper

District Attorney of Rankin County and Madison County
- In office 2008–2019
- Preceded by: David Clark
- Succeeded by: John Bramlett

Personal details
- Born: Michael Patrick Guest; February 4, 1970 (age 56) Woodbury, New Jersey, U.S.
- Party: Republican
- Spouse: Haley Kennedy
- Children: 2
- Education: Mississippi State University (BS); University of Mississippi (JD)
- Website: House website Campaign website
- Guest's voice Guest on a House resolution honoring fallen police officers. Recorded May 15, 2023

Michael Patrick Guest (born February 4, 1970) is an American attorney and Republican politician. He has represented Mississippi's 3rd congressional district in the United States House of Representatives since 2019. He became the ranking member of the United States House Committee on Ethics upon the August 2022 death of Jackie Walorski, and he became its chair in the 118th Congress after Republicans won a House majority that November.

== Early life and education ==
Michael Patrick Guest was born on February 4, 1970. He graduated from Mississippi State University with a bachelor's degree in accounting and the University of Mississippi School of Law with a Juris Doctor. He served as the Assistant District Attorney for Madison and Rankin counties from 1994 to 2008, and became District Attorney in 2008. Guest and his family are members of Brandon Baptist Church, where he serves as a deacon and Sunday school teacher.

== U.S. House of Representatives ==
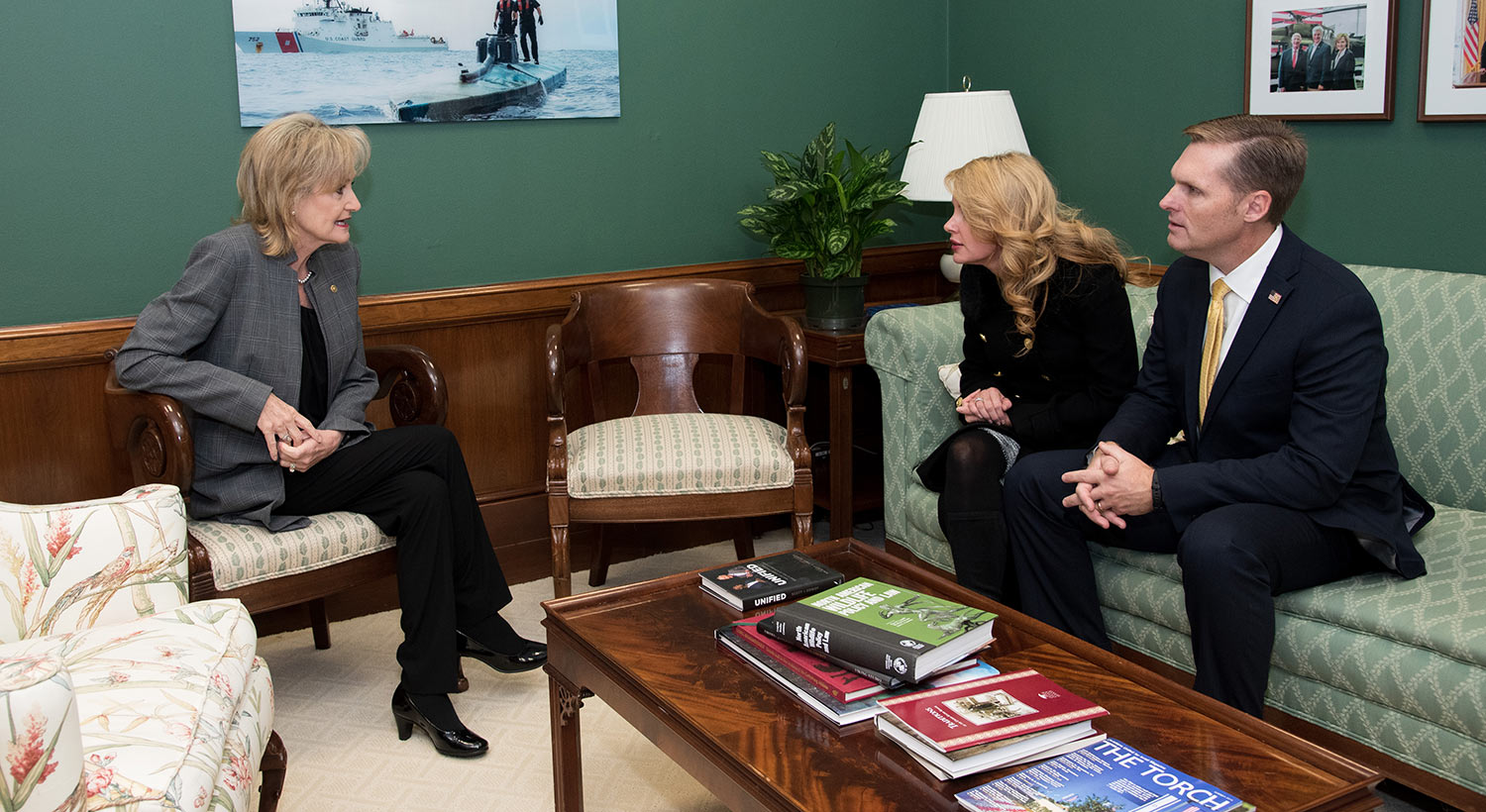
Guest and his wife meet with Cindy Hyde-Smith in November 2018

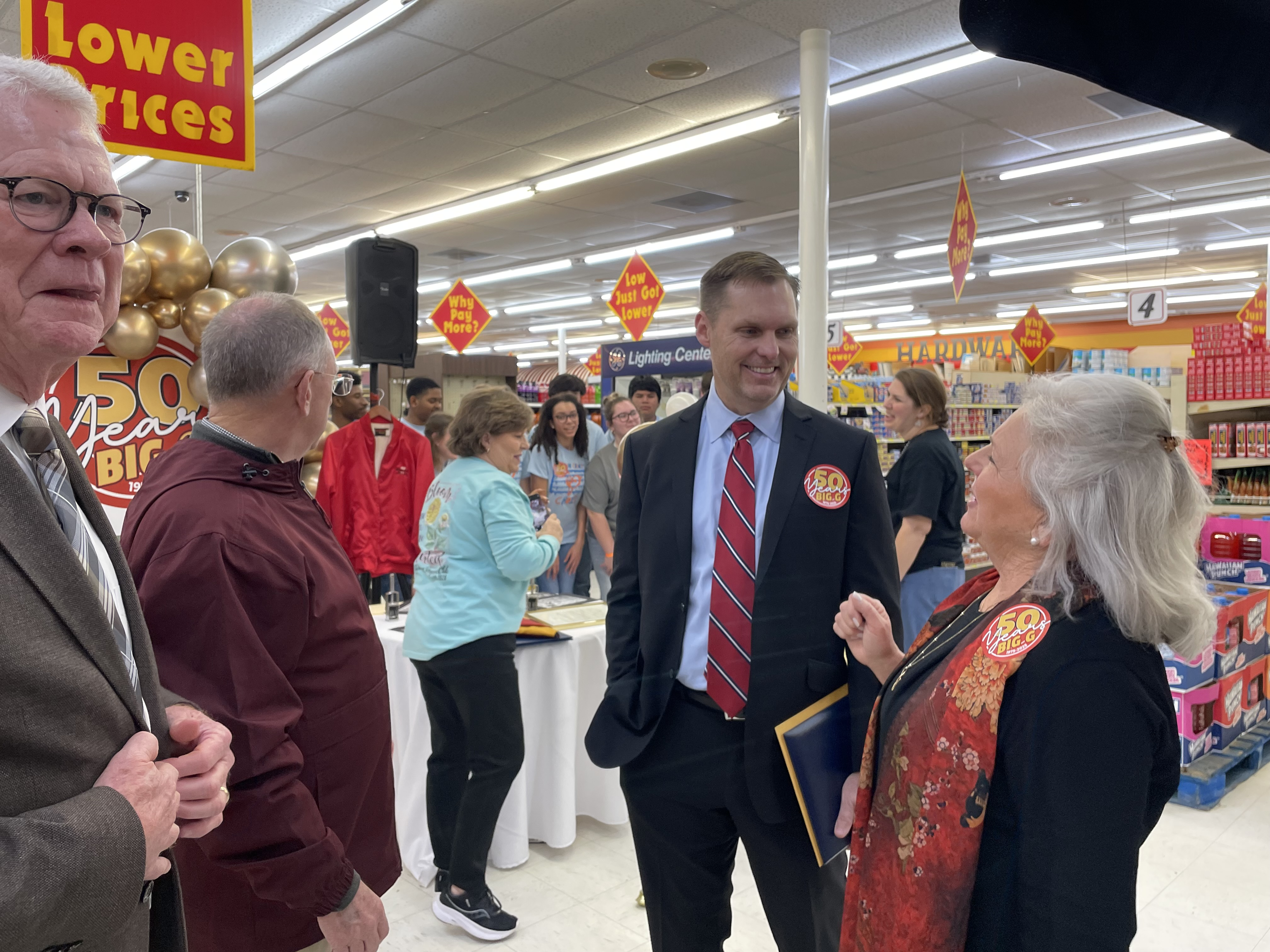
Guest at Big G in Decatur in 2024

=== Elections ===
==== 2018 ====
Guest ran for the United States House of Representatives in Mississippi's 3rd congressional district to succeed Gregg Harper, who chose not to seek reelection. In the six-way June Republican primary election, Guest received the most votes (45%), with Whit Hughes coming in second with 22%. Because no candidate received 50% of the vote, Guest and Hughes faced each other in a primary runoff election, which Guest won. Guest defeated State Representative Michael Evans, the Democratic nominee, in the general election.

Guest campaigned as a strong supporter of President Donald Trump.

==== 2020 ====
Guest was reelected in 2020 with 64.7% of the vote, defeating Democrat Dort Benford.

==== 2022 ====
Guest was reelected in 2022.

=== Tenure ===
Guest voted against creating the January 6th Committee.

In November 2021, Business Insider reported that Guest had violated the Stop Trading on Congressional Knowledge (STOCK) Act of 2012, a federal transparency and conflict-of-interest law, by failing to properly disclose trades in BP and ExxonMobil stock by his wife's family trust; as a result, Guest paid a $200 fine.

In June 2022, after a leaked decision by the Supreme Court of the United States to revoke the right to abortion in the case of Dobbs v. Jackson Women's Health Organization, Guest wrote to the Department of Homeland Security to demand action in the wake of attacks by Jane's Revenge, which Guest called an "anarchist extremist group" that targets crisis pregnancy centers and other anti-abortion organizations.

In August 2022, Guest was named ranking member of the House Ethics Committee upon the death of former ranking member Jackie Walorski.

Guest voted to support Israel following the 2023 Hamas attack on Israel.

He also proposed the resolution that expelled George Santos from Congress.

In 2024, Guest voted against the $60 billion military aid package for Ukraine; The Washington Post reported that some of the funding would have supported defense jobs in his constituency.

=== Committee assignments ===
For the 119th Congress:

- Committee on Appropriations
  - Subcommittee on Energy and Water Development and Related Agencies
  - Subcommittee on Homeland Security
  - Subcommittee on Military Construction, Veterans Affairs, and Related Agencies
- Committee on Ethics (Chair)
- Committee on Homeland Security
  - Subcommittee on Border Security and Enforcement (Chairman)

=== Caucus memberships ===
- Army Caucus
- Border Security Caucus
- Chicken Caucus
- Fire Services Caucus
- Freshman Working Group on Addiction
- Law Enforcement Caucus
- National Guard and Reserve Caucus
- Prayer Caucus
- Pro-Life Caucus
- Republican Study Committee
- Rice Caucus
- Sportsman Caucus
- Steel Caucus
- Suburban Caucus
- Unmanned Systems Caucus

== Electoral history ==
2018 Republican primary results
Party	Candidate	Votes	%
Republican	Michael Guest	29,157	44.8
Republican	Whit Hughes	14,464	22.2
Republican	Perry Parker	10,562	16.2
Republican	Sally Doty	6,608	10.2
Republican	Morgan Dunn	3,820	5.9
Republican	Katherine Tate	416	0.6
Total votes		65,027	100.0

Republican primary runoff results
Party	Candidate	Votes	%
Republican	Michael Guest	31,121	65.1
Republican	Whit Hughes	16,691	34.9
Total votes		47,812	100.0

Mississippi's 3rd congressional district, 2018
Party	Candidate	Votes	%
Republican	Michael Guest	160,284	62.3
Democratic	Michael Evans	94,461	36.7
Reform	Matthew Holland	2,526	1.0
Total votes		257,271	100.0
Republican hold			

2020 Republican primary results
Party	Candidate	Votes	%
Republican	Michael Guest (incumbent)	67,269	89.8
Republican	James Tulp	7,618	10.2
Total votes		74,887	100.0%

Mississippi's 3rd congressional district, 2020
Party	Candidate	Votes	%
Republican	Michael Guest (incumbent)	221,064	64.7
Democratic	Dorothy "Dot" Benford	120,782	35.3
Total votes		341,846	100.0
Republican hold			

Mississippi's 3rd congressional district, 2022
Party	Candidate	Votes	%
Republican	Michael Guest (incumbent)	132,481	70.7
Democratic	Shuwaski Young	54,803	29.3
Total votes		187,284	100.0
Republican hold			

Mississippi's 3rd congressional district, 2024
Party	Candidate	Votes	%
Republican	Michael Guest (incumbent)	265,159	100.0
Total votes		265,159	100.0
Republican hold			

U.S. House of Representatives
Preceded by Gregg Harper	Member of the U.S. House of Representatives from Mississippi's 3rd congressional district 2019–present	Incumbent
Preceded by Jackie Walorski	Ranking Member of the House Ethics Committee; Acting; 2022–2023	Succeeded by Susan Wild
Preceded by Susan Wild	Chair of the House Ethics Committee; 2023–present	Incumbent
U.S. order of precedence (ceremonial)
Preceded by Lance Gooden	United States representatives by seniority 205th	Succeeded by Josh Harder
