= United States House Homeland Security Subcommittee on Oversight, Investigations, and Accountability =

Subcommittee of Committee on Homeland Security
- Active United States House of Representatives; 119th Congress

Leadership
- Chair: Josh Brecheen (R)
- Ranking Member: Shri Thanedar (D)

Structure
- Seats: 9 (9 currently filled) 5/5 4/4
- Political parties: Majority (5): Republican (5); Minority (4): Democratic (4)

Meeting place
- 176, Ford House Office Building; Washington, D.C. 20515

Phone number
- (202)-226-8417

The U.S. House Homeland Security Subcommittee on Oversight, Management and Accountability is a standing subcommittee within the House Homeland Security Committee.

The duties of the former Homeland Security Subcommittee on Investigations were combined with this subcommittee starting with the 110th Congress.

== Jurisdiction ==
From the committee website, the Subcommittee has jurisdiction over:

The Oversight, Investigations, and Accountability Subcommittee maintains oversight of DHS Headquarters, the Office of the Secretary, the Management Directorate (MGMT), the Office of Strategy, Policy, and Plans (PLCY), and the Office of Inspector General (OIG). The Subcommittee focuses on: the organization, administration, and management of DHS; the policies, :processes, and programs of DHS for contracts, acquisitions, human capital, civil rights and liberties, and privacy; the strategy, policy, and planning efforts of DHS in leading and supporting its offices and components; and :oversight and investigations of DHS operations and homeland security issues.

== Members, 119th Congress ==
Majority	Minority
Dan Bishop, North Carolina, Chair; Marjorie Taylor Greene, Georgia; Mike Ezell, Mississippi; Dale Strong, Alabama; Eli Crane, Arizona	Glenn Ivey, Maryland, Ranking Member; Delia Ramirez, Illinois; Shri Thanedar, Michigan; Yvette Clarke, New York
Ex officio
Mark Green, Tennessee	Bennie Thompson, Mississippi

== Historical membership rosters ==
=== 115th Congress ===
Majority	Minority
Scott Perry, Pennsylvania, Chairman; Jeff Duncan, South Carolina; Tom Marino, Pennsylvania; John Ratcliffe, Texas; Clay Higgins, Louisiana	Lou Correa, California, Ranking Member; Kathleen Rice, New York; Nanette Barragán, California
Ex officio
Michael McCaul, Texas	Bennie Thompson, Mississippi

=== 116th Congress ===
Majority	Minority
Xochitl Torres Small, New Mexico, Chair; Dina Titus, Nevada; Bonnie Watson Coleman, New Jersey; Nanette Barragán, California	Dan Crenshaw, Texas, Ranking Member; Clay Higgins, Louisiana; Jeff Van Drew, New Jersey
Ex officio
Bennie Thompson, Mississippi	Mike Rogers, Alabama

=== 117th Congress ===
Majority	Minority
Lou Correa, California, Chair; Donald Payne Jr., New Jersey; Dina Titus, Nevada; Ritchie Torres, New York	Peter Meijer, Michigan, Ranking Member; Dan Bishop, North Carolina; Diana Harshbarger, Tennessee
Ex officio
Bennie Thompson, Mississippi	John Katko, New York

=== 118th Congress ===
Majority	Minority
Dan Bishop, North Carolina, Chair; Marjorie Taylor Greene, Georgia; Mike Ezell, Mississippi; Dale Strong, Alabama; Eli Crane, Arizona	Glenn Ivey, Maryland, Ranking Member; Delia Ramirez, Illinois; Shri Thanedar, Michigan; Yvette Clarke, New York
Ex officio
Mark Green, Tennessee	Bennie Thompson, Mississippi
