= United States House Homeland Security Subcommittee on Transportation and Maritime Security =

Subcommittee of Committee on Homeland Security
- Active United States House of Representatives; 119th Congress

Leadership
- Chair: Carlos A. Giménez (R)
- Ranking Member: LaMonica McIver (D)

Structure
- Seats: 7 (7 currently filled) 4/4 3/3
- Political parties: Majority (4): Republican (4); Minority (3): Democratic (3)

Meeting place
- 176, Ford House Office Building; Washington, D.C. 20515

Phone number
- (202)-226-8417

The Homeland Security Subcommittee on Transportation and Maritime Security is a subcommittee within the House Homeland Security Committee. It was the Subcommittee on Transportation Security and Infrastructure Protection until 2011, when infrastructure jurisdiction was transferred to the Subcommittee on Cybersecurity, Infrastructure Protection, and Security Technologies.

== Members, 119th Congress ==
Majority	Minority
Carlos A. Giménez, Florida, Chair; Andrew Garbarino, New York; Eli Crane, Arizona; Sheri Biggs, South Carolina	LaMonica McIver, New Jersey, Ranking Member; Tim Kennedy, New York; Sylvester Turner, Texas (until March 5, 2025); Troy Carter, Louisiana (from March 11, 2025)
Ex officio
Mark Green, Tennessee	Bennie Thompson, Mississippi

== Historical membership rosters ==
=== 115th Congress ===
Majority	Minority
John Katko, New York, Chairman; Peter T. King, New York; Mike Rogers, Alabama; Clay Higgins, Louisiana; Brian Fitzpatrick, Texas	Bonnie Watson Coleman, New Jersey, Ranking Member; Bill Keating, Massachusetts; Donald Payne Jr., New Jersey
Ex officio
Michael McCaul, Texas	Bennie Thompson, Mississippi

=== 116th Congress ===
Majority	Minority
Lou Correa, California, Chair; Emanuel Cleaver, Missouri; Dina Titus, Nevada; Bonnie Watson Coleman, New Jersey; Nanette Barragán, California; Val Demings, Florida	Debbie Lesko, Arizona, Ranking Member; John Katko, New York; Jeff Van Drew, New Jersey; Dan Bishop, North Carolina
Ex officio
Bennie Thompson, Mississippi	Mike Rogers, Alabama

=== 117th Congress ===
Majority	Minority
Bonnie Watson Coleman, New Jersey, Chair; Donald Payne Jr., New Jersey; Dina Titus, Nevada; Josh Gottheimer, New Jersey; Elaine Luria, Virginia	Carlos Giménez, Florida, Ranking Member; Jeff Van Drew, New Jersey; Ralph Norman, South Carolina; Mariannette Miller-Meeks, Iowa
Ex officio
Bennie Thompson, Mississippi	John Katko, New York

=== 118th Congress ===
Majority	Minority
Carlos A. Giménez, Florida, Chair; Clay Higgins, Florida; Nick LaLota, New York; Laurel Lee, Florida	Shri Thanedar, Michigan, Ranking Member; Donald Payne Jr., New Jersey (until April 24, 2024); Robert Garcia, California
Ex officio
Mark Green, Tennessee	Bennie Thompson, Mississippi
