= United States House Homeland Security Subcommittee on Border Security and Enforcement =

Subcommittee of Committee on Homeland Security
- Active United States House of Representatives; 119th Congress

Leadership
- Chair: Michael Guest (R)
- Ranking Member: Lou Correa (D)

Structure
- Seats: 11 (11 currently filled) 6/6 5/5
- Political parties: Majority (6): Republican (6); Minority (5): Democratic (5)

Meeting place
- 176, Ford House Office Building; Washington, D.C. 20515

Phone number
- (202)-226-8417

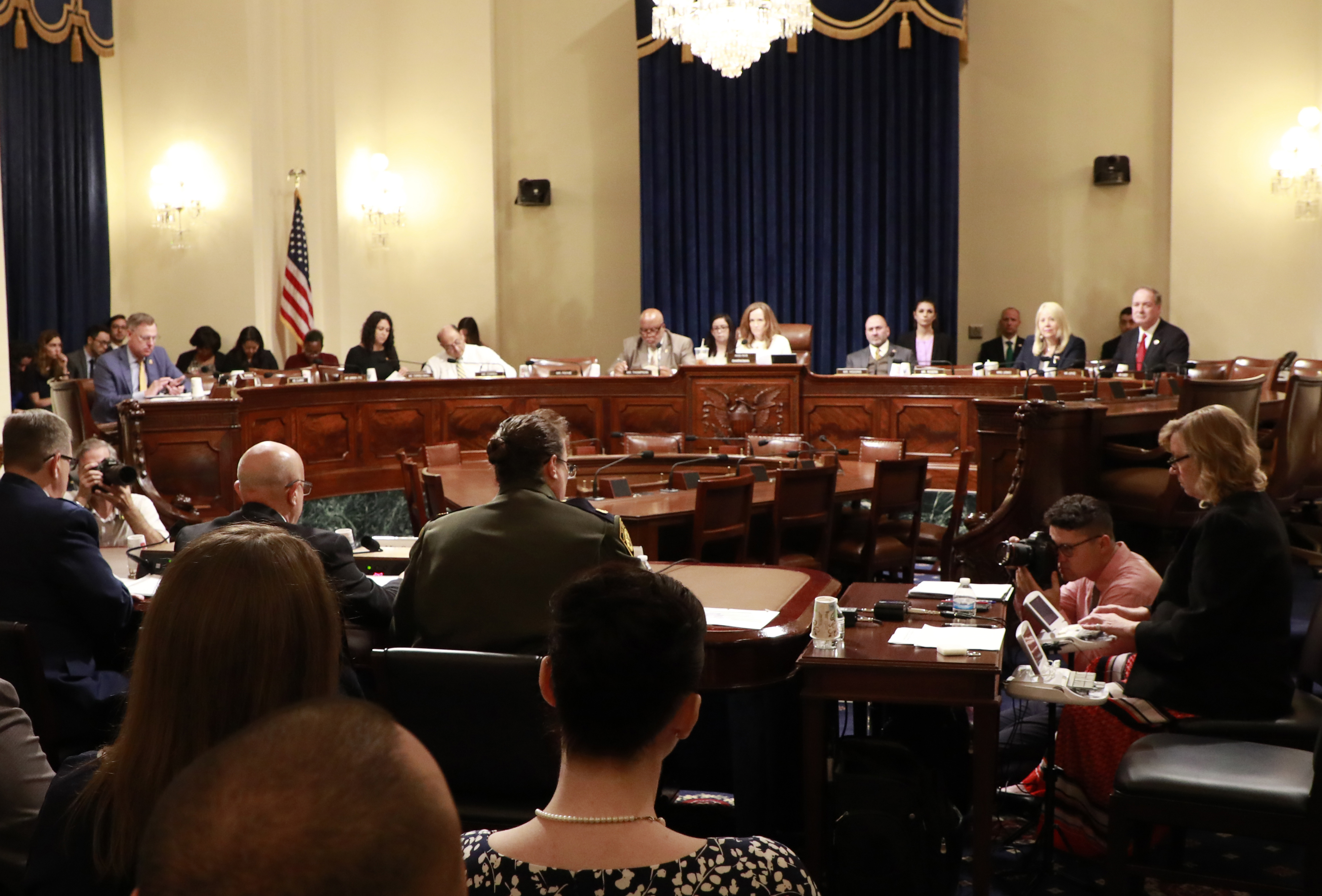
The subcommittee holds a hearing in 2019

The Homeland Security Subcommittee on Border Security and Enforcement is a subcommittee within the House Homeland Security Committee. The Subcommittee focuses on: border and port security in the northern and southern land, air, and maritime domains; international aspects of border security; DHS policies and operations facilitating lawful trade and travel; CBP staffing and resource allocations at and between air, land, and sea ports of entry; and ICE and USCIS border security activities. Subcommittee maintains oversight of U.S. Customs and Border Protection (CBP), Immigration and Customs Enforcement (ICE), and U.S. Citizenship and Immigration Services (USCIS).

Between 2019 and 2023, it was known as Homeland Security Subcommittee on Border Security, Facilitation and Operations.

== Members, 119th Congress ==
Majority	Minority
Michael Guest, Mississippi, Chair; Tony Gonzales, Texas; Eli Crane, Arizona; Andy Ogles, Tennessee; Sheri Biggs, South Carolina; Brad Knott, North Carolina	Lou Correa, California, Ranking Member; Delia Ramirez, Illinois; Julie Johnson, Texas
Ex officio
Mark Green, Tennessee	Bennie Thompson, Mississippi

== Historical membership rosters ==
=== 115th Congress ===
Majority	Minority
Martha McSally, Arizona, Chairwoman; Lamar S. Smith, Texas; Mike Rogers, Alabama; Jeff Duncan, South Carolina; Lou Barletta, Pennsylvania; Will Hurd, Texas; Clay Higgins, Louisiana	Filemon Vela, Jr., Texas, Ranking Member; Cedric Richmond, Louisiana; Lou Correa, California; Val Demings, Florida; Nanette Barragán, California
Ex officio
Mike McCaul, Texas	Bennie Thompson, Mississippi

=== 116th Congress ===
Majority	Minority
Kathleen Rice, New York, Chair; Donald Payne Jr., New Jersey; Lou Correa, California; Xochitl Torres Small, New Mexico; Al Green, Texas; Yvette Clarke, New York	Clay Higgins, Louisiana, Ranking Member; Debbie Lesko, Arizona; John Joyce, Pennsylvania; Michael Guest, Mississippi
Ex officio
Bennie Thompson, Mississippi	Mike Rogers, Alabama

=== 117th Congress ===
Majority	Minority
Nanette Barragán, California, Chair; Lou Correa, California; Emanuel Cleaver, Missouri; Al Green, Texas; Yvette Clarke, New York	Clay Higgins, Louisiana, Ranking Member; Michael Guest, Mississippi; Dan Bishop, North Carolina; Andrew Clyde, Georgia
Ex officio
Bennie Thompson, Mississippi	John Katko, New York

=== 118th Congress ===
Majority	Minority
Clay Higgins, Louisiana, Chair; Michael Guest, Mississippi; Marjorie Taylor Greene, Georgia; Tony Gonzales, Texas; Morgan Luttrell, Texas; Josh Brecheen, Oklahoma	Lou Correa, California, Ranking Member; Sheila Jackson Lee, Texas; Shri Thanedar, Michigan; Robert Garcia, California; Delia Ramirez, Illinois
Ex officio
Mark Green, Tennessee	Bennie Thompson, Mississippi
