= Lou Barletta =

American politician (born 1956)

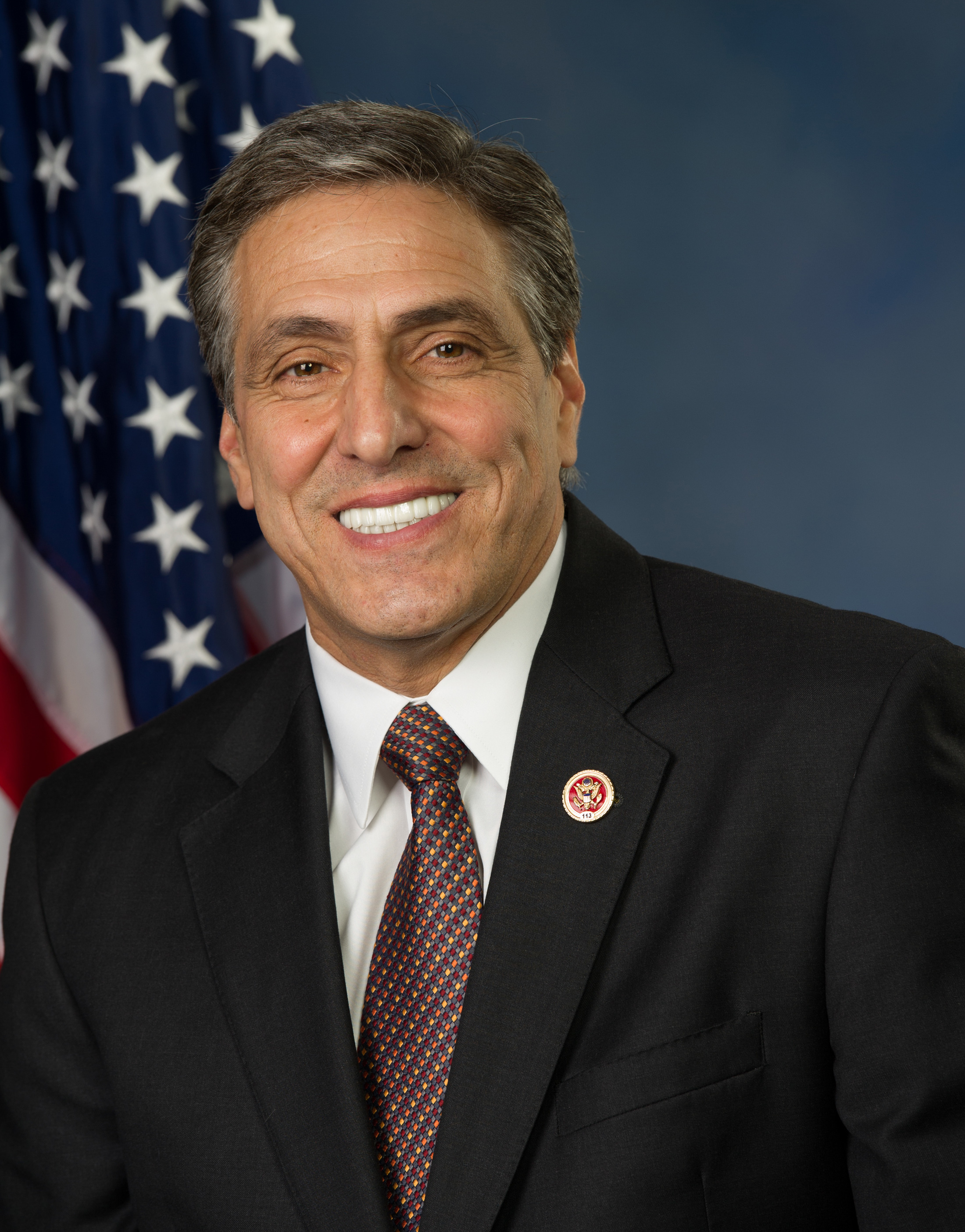
- Official portrait, 2013

Member of the U.S. House of Representatives from Pennsylvania's 11th district
- In office January 3, 2011 – January 3, 2019
- Preceded by: Paul Kanjorski
- Succeeded by: Dan Meuser (redistricted)

Mayor of Hazleton
- In office January 3, 2000 – December 14, 2010
- Preceded by: Michael Marsicano
- Succeeded by: Joseph Yannuzzi

Personal details
- Born: Louis John Barletta; January 28, 1956 (age 70) Hazleton, Pennsylvania, U.S.
- Party: Republican
- Spouse: Mary Malloy (m. 1977)
- Children: 4
- Education: Luzerne County Community College; Bloomsburg University (BA)

Louis John Barletta (born January 28, 1956) is an American businessman and politician who served as the U.S. representative for Pennsylvania's 11th congressional district from 2011 to 2019. A member of the Republican Party, he served as mayor of Hazleton, Pennsylvania, from 2000 to 2010.

As mayor, he came to prominence due to a high-profile immigration ordinance. During his tenure, he challenged longtime Democratic incumbent Paul Kanjorski of the 11th congressional district three times, eventually defeating him in 2010. Barletta was re-elected three times to serve in Congress.

In 2018, Barletta was the unsuccessful Republican nominee for the U.S. Senate, losing to Democratic incumbent Bob Casey Jr. by a 13-point margin in the general election. He also ran unsuccessfully in the 2022 Republican primary for governor of Pennsylvania, losing to Doug Mastriano.

== Early life ==
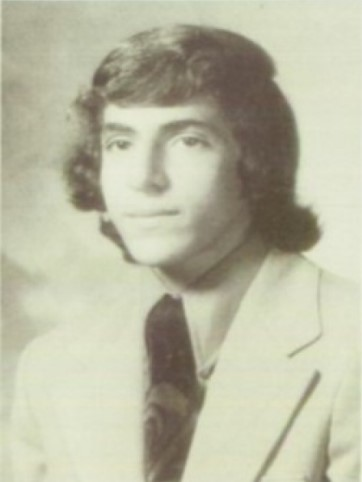
Barletta at Hazleton High School, 1973

Barletta was born on January 28, 1956, in Hazleton, Pennsylvania, the son of Angeline (née DeAngelo) and Rocco Barletta, who married on September 6, 1943, and were both of Italian ancestry. Rocco Barletta helped manage several of the family's businesses, including Angela Park, which operated in nearby Drums until it closed in 1988, and served on the executive committee of the Democratic Party of Hazleton. Rocco and Angeline died in 1994 and 1999, respectively.

At 18-months-old, Barletta was involved in a car crash, suffering a minor bruise to his left ear and to the right side of his head. After high school, he attended Luzerne County Community College and Bloomsburg University of Pennsylvania. He graduated with a major in elementary education and made an unsuccessful tryout for the Cincinnati Reds baseball team, having been cut after failing to hit a curveball. Barletta then went to work for his family's construction and heating oil business.

In 1984, Barletta founded a pavement marking company, Interstate Road Marking Corporation, which he sold in 2000. At the time of the sale, his firm had grown to become the largest of its kind in Pennsylvania.

== Mayor of Hazleton ==
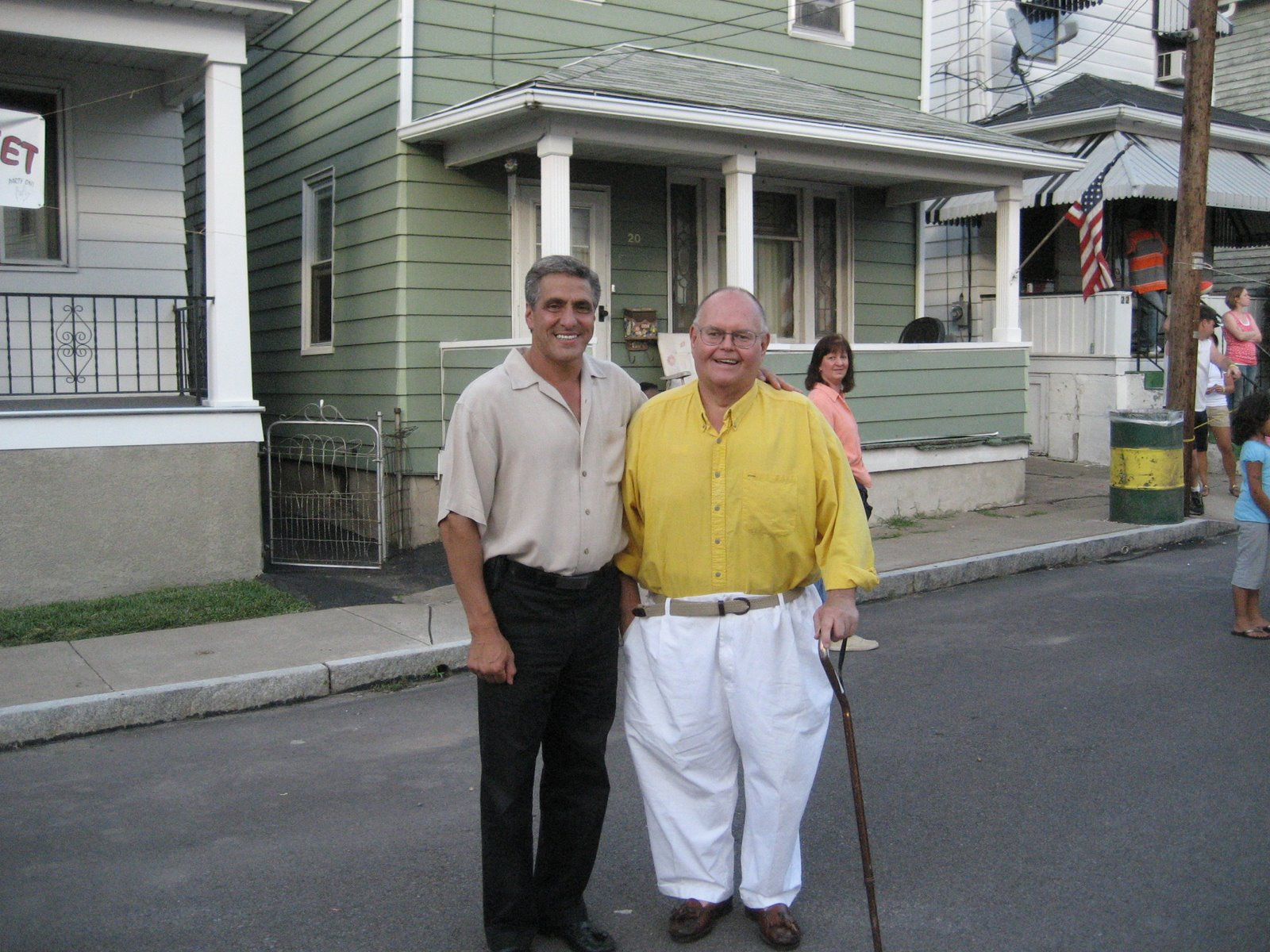
Barletta with a constituent in January 2009

Republican Barletta was defeated for a seat on the Hazleton City Council in 1995, but won two years later. In 1999, the incumbent Democratic mayor, Michael Marsicano, was beleaguered by the city's growing deficit, topping off at $855,000, and was primaried in an upset by Jack Mundie. Barletta would defeat Mundie in the general election, overcoming a Democratic voter registration edge in the city (estimated at 5,771 to 3,509 in 2007). Barletta took office January 3, 2000.

Barletta was reelected in 2003, defeating Democrat Jack Craig and Socialist Tim Mailhot, who campaigned on opposition to the Iraq War. In 2007, Barletta received 1,007 votes as a write-in candidate in the Democratic mayoral primary, enough to defeat former Mayor Marsicano, and be listed under both the Republican and Democratic parties in the general election.

During Barletta's first term, Hazleton received the Governor's Award for Fiscal Accountability and Best Management Practices. In 2004, Barletta was appointed to the United Nations Advisory Committee of Local Authorities by President George W. Bush. Crime statistics in Hazleton showed a drop in crime every year between the years 2006 and 2011.

=== Immigration ordinance ===
During Barletta's tenure, the Hispanic population of Hazleton climbed from 5 percent in 2000 to 30 percent in 2006. That year, Barletta made headlines for his efforts opposing illegal immigration in Hazleton, vowing to make the city "one of the toughest places in the United States" for illegal immigrants. Barletta introduced and the city council approved the Illegal Immigration Relief Act. The ordinance allowed the city to deny a business permit to employers who hired illegal immigrants and gave the city authority to fine landlords up to $1,000 for leasing to illegal immigrants. The act also made English the official language of Hazleton, prohibiting city employees from translating documents into any language without official authorization. The widespread publicity saw support for Barletta emerge from Republican politicians such as former New York City mayor Rudy Giuliani, and conservative figures such as Tucker Carlson and Neil Cavuto. In response to the law, the American Civil Liberties Union (ACLU) and the Puerto Rican Legal Defense and Education Fund sued in federal district court to block the ordinance.

In July 2007, Judge James Martin Munley ruled that the act was unconstitutional, claiming it interfered with federal immigration laws and violated the due process of individuals, employers, and landlords. The ruling was upheld on appeal to the U.S. Court of Appeals for the Third Circuit on September 9, 2010. In a public statement shortly after the decision, Barletta vowed to appeal once more. The Supreme Court declined to hear the case. In 2014, four years after Barletta had left office, the city of Hazleton received a court order to reimburse the ACLU $1.4 million in legal fees, and the city, which was already $6 million in debt due to tax anticipation notes it had secured in 2010 and 2011, had to take additional loans to pay the fees.

== U.S. House of Representatives ==
=== Elections ===
==== 2002 ====
In 2002, Barletta ran as the Republican candidate in the 11th congressional district against nine-term Democratic incumbent Paul Kanjorski. The 11th had long been considered the most Democratic district in Pennsylvania outside of Philadelphia and Pittsburgh. However, Barletta was viewed as a very strong candidate—the first credible Republican challenger Kanjorski had faced since his 1986 reelection bid—since he was a very popular Republican mayor from a heavily Democratic city. Barletta lost, taking 42 percent of the vote, losing the district's share of Lackawanna County, home to Scranton, by 32 points.

==== 2008 ====
Barletta faced Kanjorski again in 2008. He denounced the endorsement of David Duke in this race. Despite Kanjorski being easily reelected with 72 percent of the vote two years earlier, multiple polls had shown Barletta leading Kanjorski by as much as 5 percentage points, and the race was pegged as one of the nation's most competitive leading into the November elections. It was also one of very few nationwide where a Republican challenger had a credible chance at unseating a Democratic incumbent. Barletta lost to Kanjorski 48–52 percent, largely due to losing Lackawanna County by 12,800 votes and the down-ballot coattail advantage bestowed to Kanjorski thanks to the presence of Barack Obama on the mainline ticket. Barletta won the territory that had been in the district prior to the 2000s round of redistricting by almost 4,000 votes.

==== 2010 ====
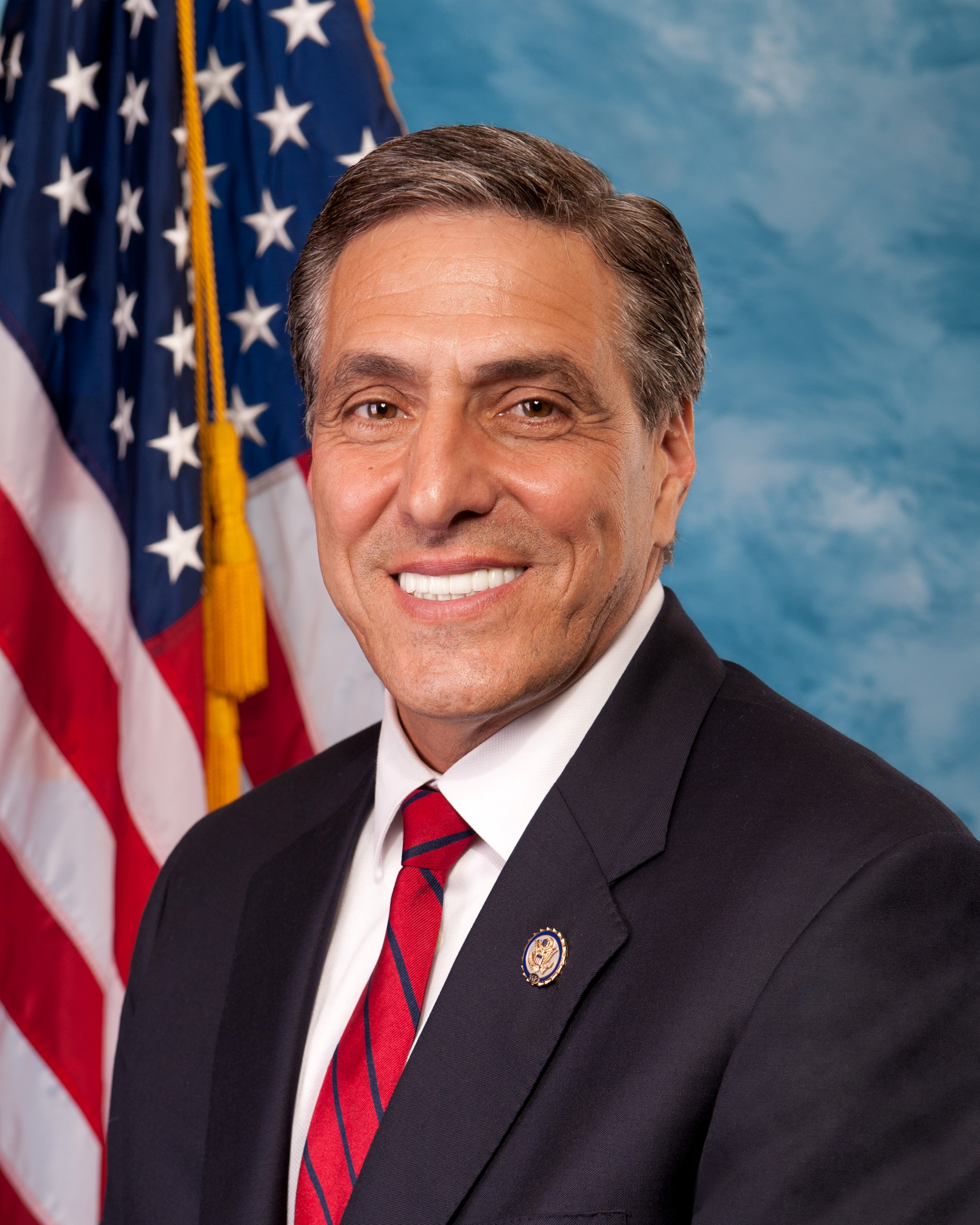
Official portrait of Barletta in the U.S. House of Representatives

Barletta announced on December 9, 2009, that he would once again challenge Kanjorski in 2010. He won his party's nomination on May 18, 2010. Kanjorski was again seen as one of the country's most vulnerable incumbents, with forecasters rating it a toss-up or a possible Republican pick-up. Barletta won the general election on November 2, 2010, beating Kanjorski by a 55–45 percentage margin. City Council President Joe Yannuzzi succeeded Barletta as mayor of Hazleton on December 15, 2010.

==== 2012 ====
In the 2008 presidential election, Barack Obama carried the 11th congressional district with 57 percent of the vote. However, after a gerrymander by a Republican-led legislature, the 11th was redrawn into a district in which Obama would have received only 47 percent of the vote.

Barletta won reelection with 58 percent of the vote.

==== 2014 ====
Barletta was easily reelected, winning with 66 percent of the vote.

==== 2016 ====
Michael Marsicano, a fellow former Hazleton mayor, ran against Barletta in the general election. Barletta was again reelected by a 63%–36% margin.

=== Tenure ===
Barletta introducing two immigration proposals to the House in July 2013

Barletta proposed five bills that later became law during his time in the House.

He proposed the Mobilizing Against Sanctuary Cities Act of 2011 that would have denied federal funding to cities or municipalities that limit cooperation with federal immigration enforcement, it was referred to some committees and subcommittees but was never voted on. He introduced the 1986 Amnesty Transparency Act and the Visa Overstay Enforcement Act of 2013, which sought to reexamine the Immigration Reform and Control Act of 1986 and prevent visa fraud by increasing prison terms and fines, respectively.

In 2014, Barletta introduced a bill to repeal a provision in the Affordable Care Act which required that volunteer emergency responders be offered healthcare by the organization they volunteer with. Barletta argued that the bill was necessary because it would be prohibitively expensive for some of organizations to provide insurance.

In 2016, Barletta joined 18 Republicans in co-sponsoring legislation that would block Deferred Action for Childhood Arrivals recipients from enlisting in the military. Barletta proposed the Disaster Recovery Reform Act in 2017, intended to amend the 1988 Stafford Disaster Relief and Emergency Assistance Act to use federal disaster assistance to directly administer both permanent and temporary housing for disaster victims, increase assistance to victims with disabilities and provide incentives for preventive preparedness of future natural disasters. It was merged into the FAA Reauthorization Act of 2018, which passed 398 to 23 in the House and 90 to 7 in the Senate. President Donald Trump would sign it into law on October 5, 2018.

Committee assignments

- Committee on Homeland Security
  - Subcommittee on Border and Maritime Security
  - Subcommittee on Transportation Security
- Committee on Transportation and Infrastructure
  - Subcommittee on Economic Development, Public Buildings, and Emergency Management (Chair)
  - Subcommittee on Highways and Transit
  - Subcommittee on Railroads, Pipelines, and Hazardous Materials
- Committee on Education and the Workforce
  - Subcommittee on Higher Education and Workforce Training
  - Subcommittee on Health, Employment, Labor, and Pensions

Caucus memberships

- Afterschool Caucuses

== 2018 Senate race ==
On July 31, 2017, the Associated Press reported that Barletta was preparing to run for the U.S. Senate, seeking the Republican nomination to challenge Democratic incumbent Bob Casey Jr. for his seat in the 2018 midterm elections. He officially announced on August 29. Barletta had been a staunch supporter of Donald Trump. Barletta endorsed Trump for president in March 2016. According to NBC News, "Barletta is a favorite of Trump. ... Trump asked Barletta to run for Senate." Barletta was reportedly considered for a position in the Trump administration. In his 2018 Senate campaign, Barletta pledged to "give President Trump the help he needs".

He later secured the Republican nomination, but ultimately lost to Casey in the general election on November 6, 2018. Barletta's campaign had been consistently outraised throughout the election, which he attributed to his loss, alongside Casey's recognizable name advantage.

== Post congressional career ==
=== Private consulting ===
Barletta declined to return to Congress following his U.S. Senate bid, instead focusing on his newly formed consulting firm, Pioneer Strategies. He joined the board of directors of World for Brexit, an organization seeking to see Brexit passed in the United Kingdom,

=== 2020 U.S. presidential election ===
Barletta was named chairman of the Pennsylvania delegation to the 2020 Republican National Convention.

Barletta participated in the 2020–2021 Trump fake electors plot, in which Pennsylvania's role involved twenty Republicans who met in Harrisburg and pretended to cast votes for President Donald Trump as though they were Pennsylvania's lawful delegates to the 2020 Electoral College, even though the lawful delegates voted for President-elect Joe Biden. According to the group, their vote was a "procedural vote to preserve any legal claims that may be presented going forward," even though multiple lawsuits had already failed, due to a lack of evidence of electoral fraud. Unlike in other states, where fake electors were charged with forgery or attempting to overturn the election, Barletta and his fellow Pennsylvania fake electors were spared from prosecution due to a clause in their fake elector document, which stated their actions were preparatory measures should any of Trump's legal challenges prove successful. Pennsylvania Attorney General Josh Shapiro declined to prosecute the fake electors because of the clause, but nonetheless stated that "their rhetoric and policy were intentionally misleading and purposefully damaging to our democracy."

=== 2022 gubernatorial primary run ===
Following an announcement that Senator Pat Toomey would not be seeking reelection in 2022, Barletta declined to launch a second bid in pursuit of replacing him, however he did express interest in succeeding term-limited Governor Tom Wolf in 2022.

On May 17, 2021, Barletta officially announced his candidacy for governor. He cited Wolf's lockdowns enacted in light of the COVID-19 pandemic and concern over expanded mail-in ballots as his reasons for running. On the campaign trail, Barletta touted his political record as both Mayor of Hazleton and a U.S. Representative, labeling himself as being a predictable potential governor. He also made special mention of how he had run and won races in primarily Democratic areas.

Barletta lost the Republican primary election to Pennsylvania State Senator Doug Mastriano garnering 20% percent of the vote compared to Mastriano's 44%. Following his loss, Barletta said that his run for governor will be his last campaign and that he wished to spend time with his family. He also said he would support Mastriano in the general election against Democrat Josh Shapiro. Barletta credited there being too many candidates in the primary election, lack of support for him in central and western Pennsylvania, and advertisements from Shapiro's campaign labeling Mastriano as the candidate of former president Donald Trump (Shapiro's ads were published before Trump endorsed Mastriano) for his defeat. The last reason for Barletta's self-described loss is disputed, as Mastriano was already leading in the primary when the ads were published.

== Political positions ==
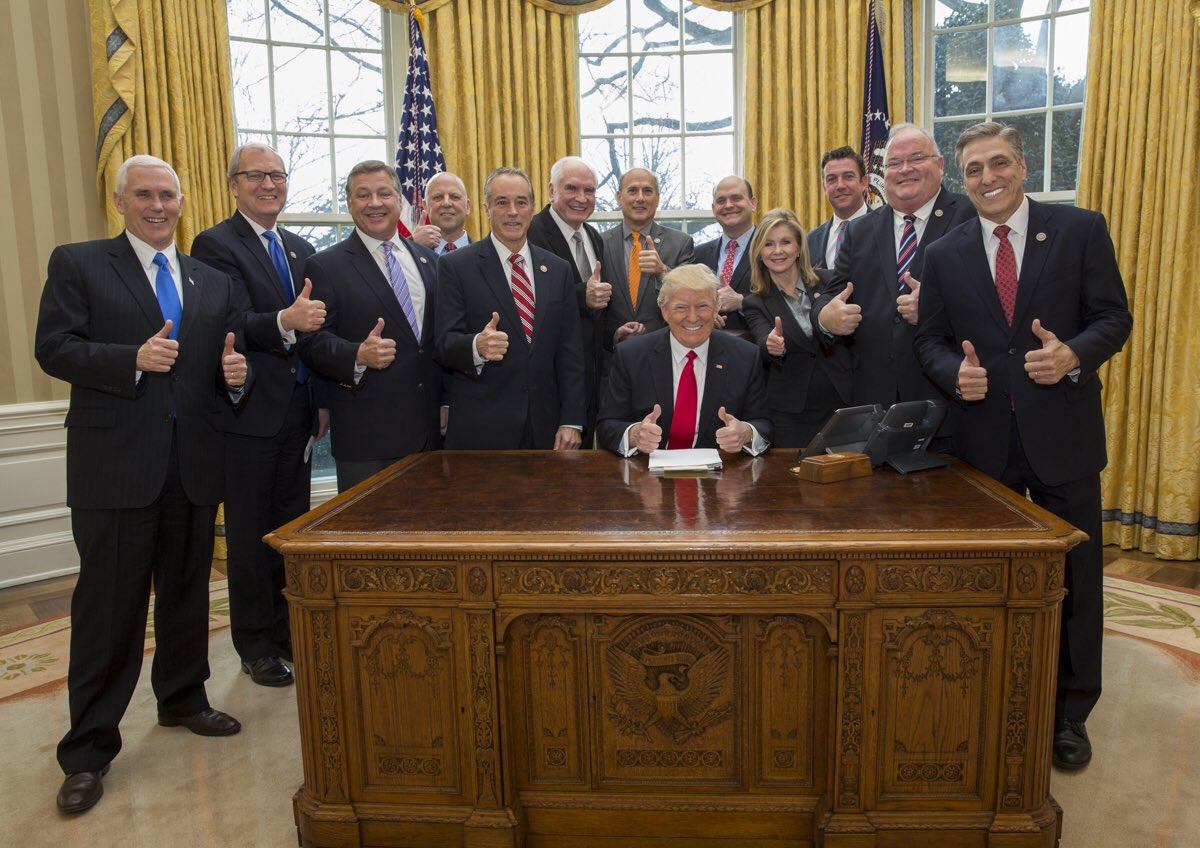
Barletta with fellow members of Congress meeting with President Donald Trump in February 2017

According to Vox in 2018, Barletta is "considered to be generally more moderate than other House Republicans, though he almost always toes the party line on major votes." While in Congress, Barletta was a loyal ally of President Donald Trump, but in late 2022, Barletta broke with Trump saying, "I was one of his most loyal supporters in Congress. But loyalty was only a one-way street." He also refused to support Trump's 2024 presidential campaign.

=== Abortion ===
Barletta voted for Micah's law, which prohibits abortion of fetuses starting with the twentieth week of pregnancy, when advocates of government regulation of abortion care contend that fetuses can be born prematurely with medical assistance and feel pain, with exceptions for victims of rape and incest who have undergone counseling and for cases of danger to the life of the mother.

Barletta has said he believes that life begins at conception.

=== Economy and budget ===
On April 15, 2011, Barletta voted with the Republican majority for Paul Ryan's budget. Barletta has characterized a balanced budget amendment as a gimmick and said he will not vote to raise the debt ceiling.

In 2017, Barletta voted for the Tax Cuts and Jobs Act, the Republican Party's tax reform legislation. In supporting the legislation, Barletta tweeted, "Our #TaxReform package doubles standard deduction, brings $$$ back home, and reduces rates for ALL taxpayers. We will #MAGA." According to PolitiFact, Barletta's claim is "mostly false", as the tax plan in 2018 cuts taxes for approximately 75 percent of Americans, while increasing them on 7 percent; by 2027, after the tax plan expires it will raise taxes for more than 25 percent of Americans.

In his run for Pennsylvania governor, Barletta said he does not see Pennsylvania as "business friendly" and said he would have used the office to promote business friendly policies.

=== Healthcare ===
Barletta opposed the Affordable Care Act (Obamacare) and voted to repeal it. Barletta had threatened not to support its attempted repeal because he wanted the repeal legislation to prohibit undocumented immigrants from applying for health insurance tax credits. After meeting with President Donald Trump and House Speaker Paul Ryan, Barletta said that they had promised to bring up separate legislation to prohibit undocumented immigrants from accessing health insurance tax credits. In 2018, Barletta said that the repeal of Obamacare would not have weakened protections for individuals with preexisting conditions; experts said that the repeal would have given states the option to seek waivers whereby insurers would be allowed to raise prices for individuals with preexisting conditions who did not have continuous coverage.

=== Immigration ===
Barletta supported President Donald Trump's 2017 executive order imposing a ban on entry to the U.S. to citizens of seven Muslim-majority countries, saying: "I commend President Trump for suspending the refugee program, and in particular for Syria and the six other countries, because they are unquestionably terrorist havens and hotspots." In 2007, Barletta opposed comprehensive immigration reform.

In January 2018, CNN reported that Barletta had frequently given interviews with a number of fringe anti-immigration groups and organizations. Barletta spokesperson Jon Anzur responded that Barletta had "always condemned 'hate, bigotry, and racial supremacy,'" adding, "'[o]f course Lou was not aware of these individuals’ background[s]... [a]s the mayor of a small city, Lou didn't have the resources or staff to screen everyone who asked him questions... Lou did 27 interviews [one day]."

=== Mail-in voting ===
In 2022, Barletta described Pennsylvania's no-excuse mail voting law as a mistake, and saw the law as preventing certainty in "free and fair elections." In 2023, Barletta advocated for Republicans to embrace mail-in voting or "continue to get clobbered in these elections."

== Personal life ==
Barletta is a Roman Catholic. He is married to Mary Grace Malloy Barletta and together they have four daughters. Mary works as an elementary school teacher, as do two of their daughters. Barletta enjoys baseball, having wanted to become a major league ballplayer during his youth, and would often participate in the annual Congressional Baseball Game during his time as a U.S. Representative. Barletta descends from Italian immigrants, and after his term in Congress, he helmed the American Italian Food Coalition and sought to protect Italian-produced food products from U.S. tariffs.

Barletta has a cousin, Allison Barletta, who serves on the Hazleton City Council as a Republican. She primaried incumbent Hazleton Mayor Jeff Cusat in May 2019, but was unsuccessful.

== Electoral history ==
1995 Hazleton City Council election
| Party | Candidate | Votes | % |
|---|---|---|---|
| Democratic | John Tarone | 3,269 | N/A |
| Democratic | Jacob Ripa III | 3,068 | N/A |
| Republican | Lou Barletta | 2,574 | N/A |
| Republican | Jean Gromley | 2,216 | N/A |
| Total votes | | 5,112 | 100 |

1997 Hazleton City Council election
| Party | Candidate | Votes | % |
|---|---|---|---|
| Democratic | James J. Ferry (incumbent) | 2,632 | N/A |
| Democratic | William Lockwood | 2,549 | N/A |
| Republican | Lou Barletta | 2,530 | N/A |
| Republican | Phil Andras (incumbent) | 2,512 | N/A |
| Republican | Charles O. Burkhardt | 2,136 | N/A |
| Democratic | Jean Gromley | 1,729 | N/A |
| Total votes | | N/A | 100 |

1999 Hazleton mayoral election
| Party | Candidate | Votes | % |
|---|---|---|---|
| Republican | Lou Barletta | 3,783 | 64.9 |
| Democratic | Jack Mundie | 2,048 | 35.1 |
| Total votes | | 5,831 | 100 |
| Republican gain from Democratic | | | |

2002 Pennsylvania's 11th congressional district election
| Party | Candidate | Votes | % |
|---|---|---|---|
| Democratic | Paul Kanjorski (incumbent) | 93,758 | 55.6 |
| Republican | Lou Barletta | 71,543 | 42.4 |
| Reform | Tom McLaughlin | 3,304 | 2.0 |
| Total votes | | 168,605 | 100 |
| Democratic hold | | | |

2003 Hazleton mayoral election
| Party | Candidate | Votes | % |
|---|---|---|---|
| Republican | Lou Barletta (incumbent) | 3,372 | 64.6 |
| Democratic | Jack Craig | 1,401 | 26.8 |
| Socialist Workers | Tim Mailhot | 450 | 8.6 |
| Total votes | | 5,223 | 100 |
| Republican hold | | | |

2007 Republican mayoral primary results
| Party | Candidate | Votes | % |
|---|---|---|---|
| Republican | Lou Barletta (incumbent) | 1,363 | 93.2 |
| Republican | Demetria "Dee" Deakos | 83 | 5.7 |
| Write-in | | 16 | 1.1 |
| Total votes | | 1,462 | 100 |

2007 Democratic mayoral primary results
| Party | Candidate | Votes | % |
|---|---|---|---|
| Write-In | Lou Barletta (incumbent) | 1,047 | 54.5 |
| Democratic | Michael Marsicano | 741 | 37.6 |
| Write-in | | 155 | 7.9 |
| Total votes | | 1,970 | 100 |

2007 Hazleton mayoral election
| Party | Candidate | Votes | % |
|---|---|---|---|
| Republican | Lou Barletta (incumbent) | 3,530 | 89.1 |
| Libertarian | John T. Medashefski | 406 | 10.2 |
| Write-In | Michael Marsicano | 28 | 0.7 |
| Total votes | | 3,964 | 100 |
| Republican hold | | | |

2008 Pennsylvania's 11th congressional district election
| Party | Candidate | Votes | % |
|---|---|---|---|
| Democratic | Paul Kanjorski (incumbent) | 146,379 | 51.6 |
| Republican | Lou Barletta | 137,151 | 48.4 |
| Total votes | | 283,530 | 100 |
| Democratic hold | | | |

2010 Pennsylvania's 11th congressional district election
| Party | Candidate | Votes | % |
|---|---|---|---|
| Republican | Lou Barletta | 102,179 | 54.7 |
| Democratic | Paul Kanjorski (incumbent) | 84,618 | 45.3 |
| Total votes | | 186,797 | 100 |
| Republican gain from Democratic | | | |

2012 Pennsylvania's 11th congressional district election
| Party | Candidate | Votes | % |
|---|---|---|---|
| Republican | Lou Barletta (incumbent) | 166,967 | 58.5 |
| Democratic | Gene Stilp | 118,231 | 41.5 |
| Total votes | | 285,198 | 100 |
| Republican hold | | | |

2014 Pennsylvania's 11th congressional district election
| Party | Candidate | Votes | % |
|---|---|---|---|
| Republican | Lou Barletta (incumbent) | 122,464 | 66.3 |
| Democratic | Andy Ostrowski | 62,228 | 33.7 |
| Total votes | | 184,692 | 100 |
| Republican hold | | | |

2016 Pennsylvania's 11th congressional district election
| Party | Candidate | Votes | % |
|---|---|---|---|
| Republican | Lou Barletta (incumbent) | 199,421 | 63.7 |
| Democratic | Michael Marsicano | 113,800 | 36.3 |
| Total votes | | 313,221 | 100 |
| Republican hold | | | |

2018 U.S Senate Republican primary results
| Party | Candidate | Votes | % |
|---|---|---|---|
| Republican | Lou Barletta | 433,312 | 63.0 |
| Republican | Jim Christiana | 254,118 | 37.0 |
| Total votes | | 687,430 | 100 |

2018 U.S. Senate election in Pennsylvania
| Party | Candidate | Votes | % |
|---|---|---|---|
| Democratic | Bob Casey Jr. (incumbent) | 2,792,437 | 55.7 |
| Republican | Lou Barletta | 2,134,848 | 42.6 |
| Libertarian | Dale Kerns | 50,907 | 1.0 |
| Green | Neal Gale | 31,208 | 0.6 |
| Total votes | | 5,009,400 | 100 |
| Democratic hold | | | |

2022 Pennsylvania gubernatorial election, Republican Primary
| Party | Candidate | Votes | % |
|---|---|---|---|
| Republican | Doug Mastriano | 590,703 | 43.8 |
| Republican | Lou Barletta | 272,884 | 20.2 |
| Republican | William McSwain | 212,536 | 15.8 |
| Republican | Dave White | 128,885 | 9.6 |
| Republican | Melissa Hart (withdrew) | 54,307 | 4.0 |
| Republican | Joe Gale | 27,756 | 2.1 |
| Republican | Jake Corman (withdrew) | 25,903 | 1.9 |
| Republican | Charlie Gerow | 17,829 | 1.3 |
| Republican | Nche Zama | 16,111 | 1.2 |
| Total votes | | 1,346,914 | 100.0 |

U.S. House of Representatives
| Preceded by Paul Kanjorski | Member of the U.S. House of Representatives from Pennsylvania's 11th congressional district 2011–2019 | Succeeded by Lloyd Smucker |
Party political offices
| Preceded by Tom Smith | Republican nominee for U.S. Senator from Pennsylvania (Class 1); 2018 | Succeeded by Dave McCormick |
U.S. order of precedence (ceremonial)
| Preceded by Don Sherwood as Former U.S. Representative | Order of precedence of the United States as Former U.S. Representative | Succeeded by Tom Marino as Former U.S. Representative |
