= United States House Homeland Security Subcommittee on Cybersecurity and Infrastructure Protection =

US House committee

Subcommittee of Committee on Homeland Security
- Active United States House of Representatives; 119th Congress

Leadership
- Chair: Andy Ogles (R)
- Ranking Member: Delia Ramirez (D)

Structure
- Seats: 9 (9 currently filled) 5/5 4/4
- Political parties: Majority (5): Republican (5); Minority (4): Democratic (4)

Meeting place
- 176, Ford House Office Building; Washington, D.C. 20515

Phone number
- (202)-226-8417

The Homeland Security Subcommittee on Cybersecurity, Infrastructure Protection and Innovation is a subcommittee within the House Homeland Security Committee. Established in 2007 as a new subcommittee, it handles many of the duties of the former Commerce Subcommittee on Economic Security, Infrastructure Protection, and Cybersecurity.

The Subcommittee focuses on: protecting federal networks; strengthening critical infrastructure security and resilience; and advancing cooperation between the federal government and non-federal owners and operators of the critical infrastructure that underpins our national security, economy, and way of life. The Subcommittee maintains oversight of the Cybersecurity and Infrastructure Security Agency (CISA) and the cybersecurity missions and operations of other DHS components.

== Members, 119th Congress ==
Majority	Minority
Andrew Garbarino, New York, Chair; Clay Higgins, Louisiana; Carlos A. Giménez, Florida; Morgan Luttrell, Texas; Andy Ogles, Tennessee	Vacant, Ranking Member; Seth Magaziner, Rhode Island; LaMonica McIver, New Jersey; Sylvester Turner, Texas (until March 5, 2025)
Ex officio
Mark Green, Tennessee	Bennie Thompson, Mississippi

== Historical membership rosters ==
=== 118th Congress ===
Majority	Minority
Andrew Garbarino, New York, Chair; Carlos Gimenez, Florida; Mike Ezell, Mississippi; Laurel Lee, Florida; Morgan Luttrell, Texas	Eric Swalwell, California, Ranking Member; Sheila Jackson Lee, Texas; Troy Carter, Louisiana; Rob Menendez, New Jersey
Ex officio
Mark Green, Tennessee	Bennie Thompson, Mississippi

=== 117th Congress ===
Majority	Minority
Yvette Clarke, New York, Chair; Sheila Jackson Lee, Texas; James Langevin, Rhode Island; Elissa Slotkin, Michigan; Kathleen Rice, New York; Ritchie Torres, New York	Andrew Garbarino, New York, Ranking Member; Ralph Norman, South Carolina; Diana Harshbarger, Tennessee; Andrew Clyde, Georgia; Jake LaTurner, Kansas
Ex officio
Bennie Thompson, Mississippi	John Katko, New York

=== 116th Congress ===
Majority	Minority
Lauren Underwood, Illinois, Chair; Sheila Jackson Lee, Texas; Jim Langevin, Rhode Island; Kathleen Rice, New York; Elissa Slotkin, Michigan	John Katko, New York, Ranking Member; Mark Walker, North Carolina; Mark Green, Tennessee; Van Taylor, Texas
Ex officio
Bennie Thompson, Mississippi	Mike Rogers, Alabama

=== 115th Congress ===
Majority	Minority
John Ratcliffe, Texas, Chairman; John Katko, New York; Dan Donovan, New York; Mike Gallagher, Wisconsin; Tom Garrett Jr., Virginia; Brian Fitzpatrick, Pennsylvania	Cedric Richmond, Louisiana, Ranking Member; Sheila Jackson Lee, Texas; Jim Langevin, Rhode Island; Val Demings, Florida
Ex officio
Michael McCaul, Texas	Bennie Thompson, Mississippi

== See also ==
- United States House Committee on Homeland Security
