= Sheri Biggs =

American politician (born 1970)

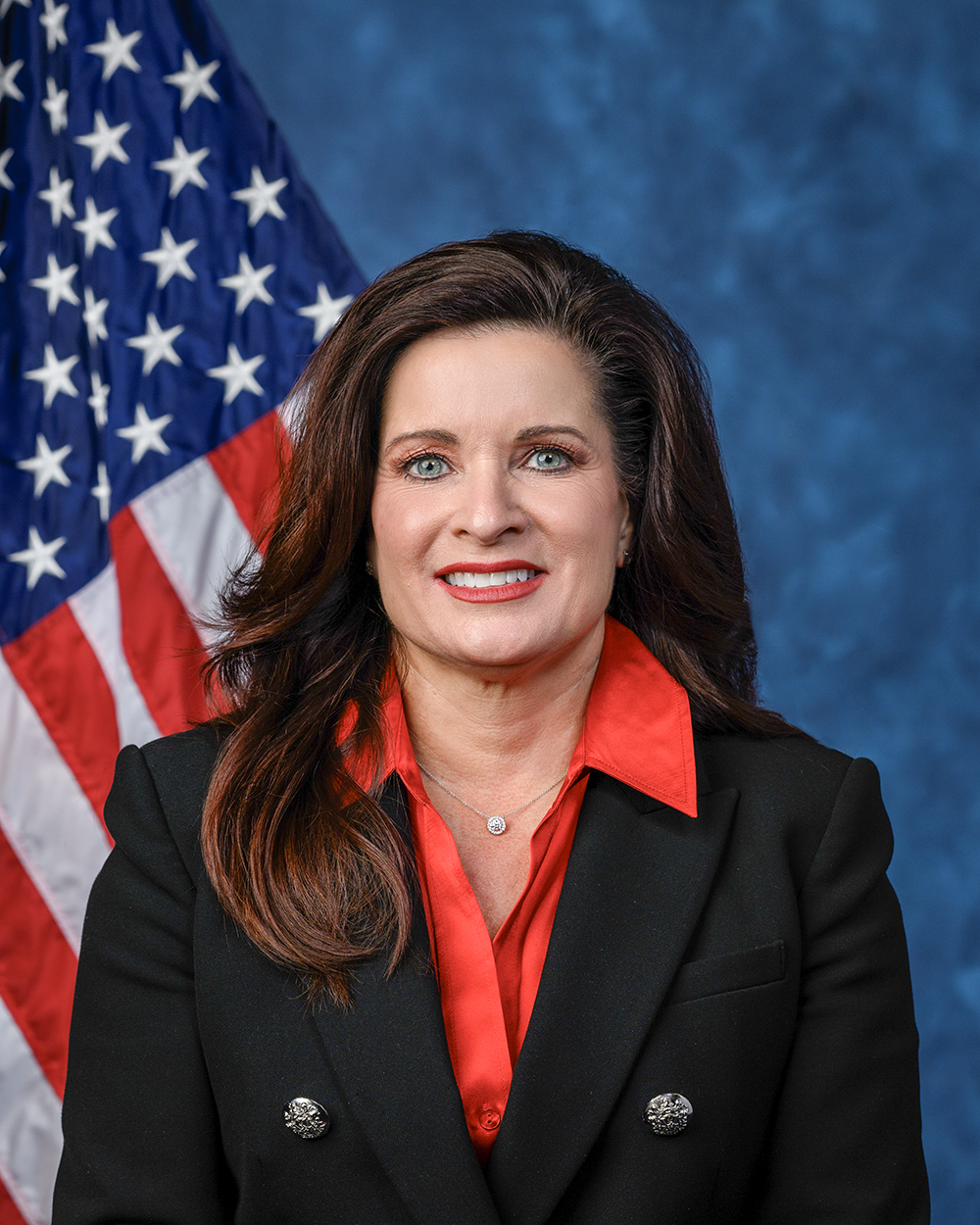
- Official portrait, 2025

Member of the U.S. House of Representatives from South Carolina's 3rd district
- Incumbent
- Assumed office January 3, 2025
- Preceded by: Jeff Duncan

Personal details
- Born: March 28, 1970 (age 56) Kosciusko, Mississippi, U.S.
- Party: Republican
- Spouse: Bill Biggs
- Children: 2
- Education: Carolina College of Biblical Studies (BS); Samford University (DNP)
- Website: House website Campaign website

Military service
- Branch/service: United States Air Force
- Rank: Lieutenant Colonel
- Unit: Mississippi Air National Guard

Sheryl Scott Biggs (born March 28, 1970) is an American politician from South Carolina. A Republican, she represents South Carolina's 3rd congressional district in the United States House of Representatives.

== Early life ==
Biggs is from Kosciusko, Mississippi. She graduated from Kosciusko High School in 1988, from Carolina Bible College with a bachelor's degree in Christian ministries, professional military education from USAF Air War College at Air University, and from Samford University with a Doctor of Nursing Practice. Biggs is a nurse practitioner and served in the Mississippi Air National Guard, reaching the rank of lieutenant colonel.

== U.S. House of Representatives ==
=== Tenure ===
Biggs was sworn in to the 119th United States Congress on January 3, 2025. Upon swearing in on January 3, 2025, she became the second Republican woman to represent South Carolina in the House of Representatives, after Nancy Mace.

Biggs represents Lindsey Graham's home district; after his death in July 2026, she spoke at his Rotunda ceremony (alongside JD Vance and John Thune) giving a prayer for his family and saying that the senator "spent his life standing for something larger than himself."

=== Elections ===
==== 2024 House of Representatives ====
In January 2024, Jeff Duncan announced that he would not seek reelection in the United States House of Representatives. In fourteen years, he never saw a single primary challenger. Just a day after his announcement, Biggs declared her candidacy for the seat, becoming one of seven people to seek his former seat in the 2024 elections.

William Biggs, her husband, is a donor and political confidant to Governor Henry McMaster. McMaster endorsed her from the start of her campaign, resulting in the sole Congressional race where Donald Trump and McMaster split endorsements, with Trump backing her opponent Mark Burns. The candidates split on the issue of a national abortion ban with Biggs being open to it whereas Burns echoed Trump's position of leaving abortion to the states. In the primary, Burns received 33% of the vote and Biggs received 29%; in the subsequent primary runoff, she would defeat Burns 51% to 49% with a margin of about a thousand votes. The primary and runoff were costly; Burns's campaign took out $750,000 in loans, and Biggs raised $220,000 and loaned her campaign an additional $345,000.

After backing Burns in the primary and runoff, Trump endorsed Biggs in the general election. Biggs was heavily favored to win the R+21 district in the general election, ultimately receiving 71.7% of the final vote. Biggs had raised $897,035 with $145,139 on hand as of September 30 following the primary. Super PACs also spent $394,271 in support of Biggs.

==== 2026 House of Representatives ====
No Republican party primary was held for District 3 in 2026. On November 3, 2026, Biggs will seek re-election against Democrat Eunice Lehmacher and Libertarian Brian Corriea.

=== Committee assignments ===
- Committee on Foreign Affairs
  - Subcommittee on East Asia and the Pacific
  - Subcommittee on Western Hemisphere
- Committee on Homeland Security
  - Subcommittee on Border Security and Enforcement
  - Subcommittee on Transportation and Maritime Security
- Committee on Science, Space, and Technology
  - Subcommittee on Energy
  - Subcommittee on Research and Technology

=== Caucus memberships ===
- Freedom Caucus

== Personal life ==
Biggs is married to William Biggs, a businessman and veteran. Her husband was CEO of Anderson-headquartered HMR Veterans Services (founded as Health Management Resources), servicing four of the six veterans nursing homes in South Carolina, from 1998 until May 2023; in 2025, she reported more than $4 million in income for 2024 from the sale of her husband’s minority stake in it. She and her husband supported Henry McMaster's political campaigns for governor of South Carolina and were members of the committee that organized the ceremonies for his inauguration in 2023.

A Mississippi-native, she moved to South Carolina in 2017 and resides in Salem, South Carolina. She is a member of Temple Baptist Church in Anderson, South Carolina where she provides counseling.

== Electoral history ==
2024 South Carolina's 3rd congressional district Republican primary results
Party	Candidate	Votes	%
Republican	Mark Burns	27,069	33.2
Republican	Sheri Biggs	23,523	28.8
Republican	Stewart Jones	15,260	18.7
Republican	Kevin Bishop	8,972	11.0
Republican	Franky Franco	3,494	4.3
Republican	Elspeth Murday	1,754	2.1
Republican	Philip Healy	1,552	1.9
Total votes		81,624	100.0

2024 South Carolina's 3rd congressional district Republican primary runoff
Party	Candidate	Votes	%
Republican	Sheri Biggs	28,156	51.0%
Republican	Mark Burns	27,064	49.0%
Total votes		55,220	100.0%

2024 South Carolina's 3rd congressional district election
Party	Candidate	Votes	%
Republican	Sheri Biggs	248,451	71.7
Democratic	Bryon Best	87,735	25.3
Alliance	Michael Bedenbaugh	9,918	2.9
Write-in		609	0.2
Total votes		346,713	100.0
Republican hold			

U.S. House of Representatives
Preceded by Jeff Duncan	Member of the U.S. House of Representatives from South Carolina's 3rd congressional district 2025–present	Incumbent
U.S. order of precedence (ceremonial)
Preceded by Wesley Bell	United States representatives by seniority 369th	Succeeded by Rob Bresnahan
