= United States House Committee on Homeland Security =

Standing committee of the United States House of Representatives

House Homeland Security Committee
Standing committee
- Active United States House of Representatives; 119th Congress

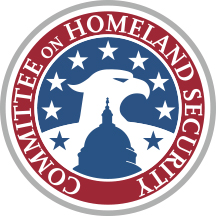
- Logo of the House Committee on Homeland Security Republicans

History
- Formed: June 19, 2002

Leadership
- Chair: Andrew Garbarino (R); Since July 21, 2025
- Ranking Member: Bennie Thompson (D); Since January 3, 2023

Structure
- Seats: 33 (33 currently filled) 18/18 15/15
- Political parties: Majority (18): Republican (18); Minority (15): Democratic (15)

Jurisdiction
- Oversight authority: Department of Homeland Security
- Senate counterpart: Senate Homeland Security and Governmental Affairs Committee

Subcommittees
- Counterterrorism and Intelligence; Transportation and Maritime Security; Cybersecurity and Infrastructure Protection; Oversight, Investigations, and Accountability; Border Security and Enforcement; Emergency Management and Technology

Meeting place
- 176, Ford House Office Building; Washington, D.C. 20515

Website
- homeland.house.gov (Republican) democrats-homeland.house.gov (Democratic)

Phone number
- (202)-226-8417

The U.S. House Committee on Homeland Security is a standing committee of the United States House of Representatives. Its responsibilities include U.S. security legislation and oversight of the Department of Homeland Security.

== Role of the committee ==
The committee conducts oversight and handles legislation (and resolutions) related to the security of the United States. The committee may amend, approve, or table homeland security related bills. It also has the power to hold hearings, conduct investigations, and subpoena witnesses. Additionally, the committee has authorization and policy oversight responsibilities over the Department of Homeland Security.

== Rules of the committee ==
The committee meets on the first Wednesday of each month while the House is in session. It is not permitted to conduct business unless a quorum is present, which the rules define as one third of its members. A majority of members are required for certain actions including: issuing a subpoena, entering executive session, and immunizing a witness. Committee members have access to classified information but must adhere to stringent access control procedures.

== History of the committee ==
In the 109th Congress, the House Select Committee on Homeland Security was established on June 19, 2002, pursuant to H. Res. 449 (adopted by voice vote). The committee was composed of nine members of the House: Rep. Armey, chair; Rep. DeLay; Rep. Watts of Oklahoma; Rep. Pryce of Ohio; Rep. Portman; Rep. Pelosi; Rep. Frost; Rep. Menendez; and Rep. DeLauro.

The mandate of the Select Committee in the 107th Congress was to “develop recommendations and report to the House on such matters that relate to the establishment of a department of homeland security.” The Select Committee accomplished its mandate on November 22, 2002, when the House concurred in the Senate amendment to H.R. 5005 by unanimous consent and cleared H.R. 5005 for the president. The bill was presented to the president on November 22, 2002, and was signed on November 25, 2002, becoming Public Law number 107-296, the "Homeland Security Act of 2002".

The termination date of the House Select Committee on Homeland Security was “after final disposition of a bill including the final disposition of any veto message on such bill,” which occurred on November 25, 2002.

The second select committee was formed in 2003 at the beginning of the 108th Congress as a select committee with Rep. Christopher Cox of California as its chair and Jim Turner of Texas as its ranking member. The creation of the committee was necessitated by the creation of the Department of Homeland Security. As an executive branch department, the newly formed Department of Homeland Security required congressional counterparts to facilitate legislative action and oversight.

The committee was made permanent when it was elevated to standing status by a vote of the House of Representatives on January 4, 2005, on the opening day of the 109th Congress, again with Rep. Chris Cox as its first permanent chair. Rep. Bennie Thompson of Mississippi was the committee's first permanent ranking member. After Cox resigned from Congress in July 2005 to become the Chair of the Securities and Exchange Commission, Rep. Peter King of New York served as chair for the remainder of the 109th Congress.

As Congress switched parties at the beginning of the 110th Congress, Rep. Thompson became the chair of the committee and Rep. King the ranking member. House control switched parties again at the beginning of the 112th Congress in 2011, and King again became the chair, and Thompson the ranking member. As the House switched parties at the beginning of the 116th Congress, Thompson again assumed the chair. The committee continues to operate in a bipartisan manner, passing almost all of its legislation out of the committee unanimously.

== Hearings ==
=== Airport computed tomography (CT) scanners ===
In November 2017, the full Homeland Security Committee held a hearing to understand how fast the U.S. government could install CT scanners into every airport in the country in order to fight threats to airlines. The hearing focused on the Transportation Security Administration's (TSA) role in keeping the country secure. The hearing was scheduled because a classified security briefing that was held earlier revealed vulnerabilities to the aviation system that concerned committee members. The latest threats, according to committee chair Michael McCaul, "were terrorists using electronic devices and laptops as bombs, and exploding the device on an airplane while the plane is in flight."

=== DHS Countering Weapons of Mass Destruction (CWMD) Office ===
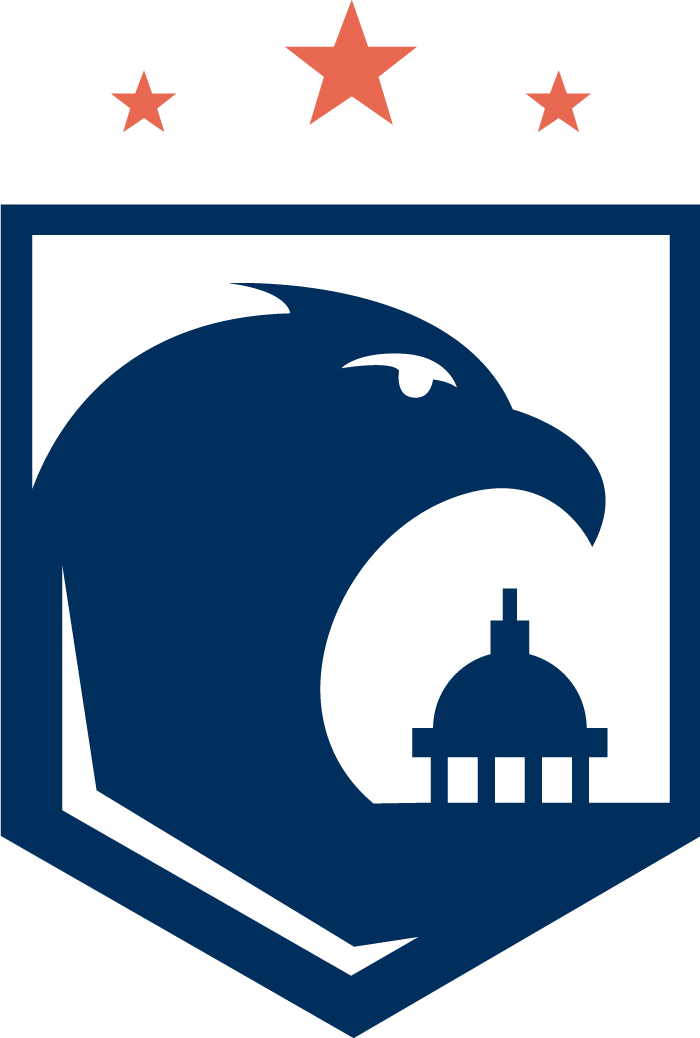
Logo used by Committee Democrats

On December 7, 2017, the Subcommittee on Emergency Preparedness, Response, and Communications held a hearing about the creation of a new office within the Department of Homeland Security (DHS) called the Countering Weapons of Mass Destruction (CWMD) Office. “The purpose of the CWMD is to work every day to prevent another catastrophic attack, one using weapons or materials that have the potential to kill our citizens in numbers that dwarf previous attacks,” said James McDonnell, assistant secretary for countering weapons of mass destruction and director of the Domestic Nuclear Detection Office for within DHS. In his remarks, the subcommittee chair Rep. Dan Donovan (R-NY) said that the threat of weapons of mass destruction "has changed and become more diverse." One witness discussed drone delivery of biological, chemical and nuclear weapons as one of the newest threats to homeland security.

== Fiscal year 2018 budget oversight ==
In June 2017, Homeland Security Secretary John Kelly testified before the committee regarding DHS's piece of President Trump's Fiscal Year 2018 Budget. During the hearing, members of the committee from both parties "expressed opposition to the Trump administration's proposed budget that would cut funding for training and deployment for local security programs by as much as 30 percent next year [2018]." The overall funding for the department, however, under Trump's budget would increase by almost seven percent. Congressman Peter King (R-NY) said the cuts would affect security programs for New York's first responders, and Congressman Donald Payne (D-NJ) questioned how the cuts would help keep safe the ports of Elizabeth and Newark.

The president's budget for 2018 would:

- Increase the DHS budget for fiscal 2018 by $2.8 billion, to $44.1 billion
- Include funding for 500 new border patrol agents
- Include funding for 1,000 new Immigration and Customs Enforcement agents
- Begin construction of the border wall that Trump promised during his presidential campaign
- Cut grants to local and state agencies by $667 million for pre-disaster mitigation and counterterrorism funding

In November 2017, in an annual oversight hearing called “World Wide Threats: Keeping America Secure in the New Age of Terror”, leaders of the U.S. government's national security agencies “offered troubling assessments of the growing threats from terrorism, both internationally and domestically.”

== Members, 119th Congress ==
Majority	Minority
Andrew Garbarino, New York, Chair (from July 22, 2025); Mark Green, Tennessee, Chair (until July 20, 2025); Michael McCaul, Texas, Chair Emeritus, Vice Chair; Clay Higgins, Louisiana; Michael Guest, Mississippi; Carlos A. Giménez, Florida; August Pfluger, Texas; Marjorie Taylor Greene, Georgia (until January 5, 2026); Tony Gonzales, Texas; Morgan Luttrell, Texas; Dale Strong, Alabama; Josh Brecheen, Oklahoma; Eli Crane, Arizona; Nick LaLota, New York (from March 25, 2026); Andy Ogles, Tennessee; Sheri Biggs, South Carolina; Gabe Evans, Colorado; Ryan Mackenzie, Pennsylvania; Brad Knott, North Carolina; Vince Fong, California (from November 18, 2025); Matt Van Epps, Tennessee (from December 11, 2025); David Joyce, Ohio (from April 21, 2026)	Bennie Thompson, Mississippi, Ranking Member; Eric Swalwell, California (until April 14, 2026); Lou Correa, California; Shri Thanedar, Michigan; Seth Magaziner, Rhode Island; Dan Goldman, New York; Delia Ramirez, Illinois; Tim Kennedy, New York; LaMonica McIver, New Jersey; Julie Johnson, Texas, Vice Ranking Member; Pablo Hernández Rivera, Puerto Rico; Nellie Pou, New Jersey; James Walkinshaw, Virginia (from November 18, 2025); Analilia Mejia, New Jersey (from April 21, 2026); Sylvester Turner, Texas (until March 5, 2025); Troy Carter, Louisiana (from March 11, 2025); Robert Garcia, California (March 11, 2025 – July 2, 2025); Al Green, Texas (from May 20, 2025)

Resolutions electing members: H.Res. 13 (Chair), H.Res. 14 (Ranking Member), H.Res. 38 (R), H.Res. 40 (D), H.Res. 214 (D), H.Res. 430 (A. Green), H.Res. 600 (Garbarino as Chair), H.Res. 886 (Fong), H.Res. 887 (Walkinshaw), H.Res. 940 (Van Epps), H.Res. 1135 (LaLota), H.Res. 1201 (Joyce), H.Res. 1202 (Mejia)

== Subcommittees ==
Subcommittee	Chair	Ranking Member
Border Security and Enforcement	Michael Guest (R-MS)	Lou Correa (D-CA)
Transportation and Maritime Security	Carlos A. Giménez (R-FL)	LaMonica McIver (D-NJ)
Counterterrorism and Intelligence	August Pfluger (R-TX)	Seth Magaziner (D-RI)
Cybersecurity and Infrastructure Protection	Andrew Garbarino (R-NY); Andy Ogles (R-TN) (from July 22, 2025)	Eric Swalwell (D-CA)
Emergency Management and Technology	Dale Strong (R-AL)	Tim Kennedy (D-NY)
Oversight, Investigations and Accountability	Josh Brecheen (R-OK)	Shri Thanedar (D-MI)

== Historical membership rosters ==
=== 115th Congress ===
Majority	Minority
Michael McCaul, Texas, Chair; Lamar Smith, Texas; Peter King, New York; Mike Rogers, Alabama; Jeff Duncan, South Carolina; Tom Marino, Pennsylvania; Lou Barletta, Pennsylvania; Scott Perry, Pennsylvania; John Katko, New York; Will Hurd, Texas; Martha McSally, Arizona; John Ratcliffe, Texas; Dan Donovan, New York; Mike Gallagher, Wisconsin; Clay Higgins, Louisiana; John Rutherford, Florida; Tom Garrett, Virginia; Brian Fitzpatrick, Pennsylvania; Don Bacon, Nebraska	Bennie Thompson, Mississippi, Ranking Member; Sheila Jackson Lee, Texas; James Langevin, Rhode Island; Cedric Richmond, Louisiana; Bill Keating, Massachusetts; Donald Payne Jr., New Jersey; Filemon Vela Jr., Texas; Bonnie Watson Coleman, New Jersey, Vice Ranking Member; Kathleen Rice, New York; Lou Correa, California; Val Demings, Florida; Nanette Barragán, California

Sources: H.Res. 6 (chair), H.Res. 7 (Ranking Member), H.Res. 45 (D) and H.Res. 51 (R)

=== 116th Congress ===
Majority	Minority
Bennie Thompson, Mississippi, Chair; Sheila Jackson Lee, Texas; James Langevin, Rhode Island; Cedric Richmond, Louisiana; Donald Payne Jr., New Jersey; Kathleen Rice, New York; Lou Correa, California; Lauren Underwood, Illinois, Vice Chair; Max Rose, New York; Xochitl Torres Small, New Mexico; Elissa Slotkin, Michigan; Emanuel Cleaver, Missouri; Al Green, Texas; Yvette Clarke, New York; Dina Titus, Nevada; Bonnie Watson Coleman, New Jersey; Nanette Barragán, California; Val Demings, Florida	Mike Rogers, Alabama, Ranking Member; Peter King, New York; Michael McCaul, Texas; John Katko, New York; Mark Walker, North Carolina; Clay Higgins, Louisiana; Debbie Lesko, Arizona; Mark Green, Tennessee; John Joyce, Pennsylvania; Dan Crenshaw, Texas; Michael Guest, Mississippi; Dan Bishop, North Carolina (since September 26, 2019); Jeff Van Drew, New Jersey (since January 16, 2020); Mike Garcia, California (since July 30, 2020)

Sources: H.Res. 24 (chair), H.Res. 25 (Ranking Member), H.Res. 67 (D), H.Res. 68 (R), H.Res. 596 (R), H.Res. 801 (R), H.Res. 1072 (R)

Subcommittees

Subcommittee	Chair	Ranking Member
Border Security, Facilitation, and Operations	Kathleen Rice (D-NY)	Clay Higgins (R-LA)
Cybersecurity, Infrastructure Protection, and Innovation	Lauren Underwood (D-IL)	John Katko (R-NY)
Emergency Preparedness, Response, and Recovery	Donald Payne Jr. (D-NJ)	Peter King (R-NY)
Intelligence and Counterterrorism	Max Rose (D-NY)	Mark Walker (R-NC)
Oversight, Management, and Accountability	Xochitl Torres Small (D-NM)	Dan Crenshaw (R-TX)
Transportation and Maritime Security	Lou Correa (D-CA)	Debbie Lesko (R-AZ)

=== 117th Congress ===
Majority	Minority
Bennie Thompson, Mississippi, Chair; Sheila Jackson Lee, Texas; James Langevin, Rhode Island; Donald Payne Jr., New Jersey; Lou Correa, California; Elissa Slotkin, Michigan; Emanuel Cleaver, Missouri; Al Green, Texas; Yvette Clarke, New York; Dina Titus, Nevada; Bonnie Watson Coleman, New Jersey; Kathleen Rice, New York; Val Demings, Florida; Nanette Barragán, California; Josh Gottheimer, New Jersey; Elaine Luria, Virginia; Tom Malinowski, New Jersey; Ritchie Torres, New York, Vice Chair	John Katko, New York, Ranking Member; Michael McCaul, Texas; Clay Higgins, Louisiana; Michael Guest, Mississippi; Dan Bishop, North Carolina; Jeff Van Drew, New Jersey; Ralph Norman, South Carolina; Mariannette Miller-Meeks, Iowa; Diana Harshbarger, Tennessee; Andrew Clyde, Georgia; Carlos A. Giménez, Florida; Jake LaTurner, Kansas; Peter Meijer, Michigan; Kat Cammack, Florida; August Pfluger, Texas; Andrew Garbarino, New York; Mayra Flores, Texas (since June 22, 2022)

Resolutions electing members: H.Res. 9 (chair), H.Res. 10 (Ranking Member), H.Res. 62 (D), H.Res. 63 (R), H.Res. 1197 (R)

Subcommittees

Subcommittee	Chair	Ranking Member
Border Security, Facilitation and Operations	Nanette Barragán (D-CA)	Clay Higgins (R-LA)
Cybersecurity, Infrastructure Protection and Innovation	Yvette Clarke (D-NY)	Andrew Garbarino (R-NY)
Emergency Preparedness, Response and Recovery	Val Demings (D-FL)	Kat Cammack (R-FL)
Intelligence and Counterterrorism	Elissa Slotkin (D-MI)	August Pfluger (R-TX)
Oversight, Management and Accountability	Lou Correa (D-NM)	Peter Meijer (R-MI)
Transportation and Maritime Security	Bonnie Watson Coleman (D-NJ)	Carlos A. Giménez (R-FL)

=== 118th Congress ===
Majority	Minority
Mark Green, Tennessee, Chair; Michael McCaul, Texas; Clay Higgins, Louisiana; Michael Guest, Mississippi, Vice Chair; Dan Bishop, North Carolina; Carlos A. Giménez, Florida; August Pfluger, Texas; Andrew Garbarino, New York; Marjorie Taylor Greene, Georgia; Tony Gonzales, Texas; Nick LaLota, New York; Mike Ezell, Mississippi; Anthony D'Esposito, New York; Laurel Lee, Florida; Morgan Luttrell, Texas; Dale Strong, Alabama; Josh Brecheen, Oklahoma; Eli Crane, Arizona	Bennie Thompson, Mississippi, Ranking Member; Sheila Jackson Lee, Texas (until July 19, 2024); Donald Payne Jr., New Jersey (until April 24, 2024); Eric Swalwell, California; Lou Correa, California; Troy Carter, Louisiana; Shri Thanedar, Michigan; Seth Magaziner, Rhode Island; Glenn Ivey, Maryland; Dan Goldman, New York; Robert Garcia, California; Delia Ramirez, Illinois, Vice Ranking Member; Rob Menendez, New Jersey; Tom Suozzi, New York (from February 29, 2024); Tim Kennedy, New York (from May 7, 2024); Yvette Clarke, New York; Dina Titus, Nevada

Resolutions electing members: H.Res. 14 (Chair), H.Res. 15 (Ranking Member), H.Res. 79 (D), H.Res. 80 (R), H.Res. 1034 (Suozzi), H.Res. 1204 (Kennedy)

Subcommittees

Subcommittee	Chair	Ranking Member
Border Security and Enforcement	Clay Higgins (R-LA)	Lou Correa (D-CA)
Counterterrorism, Law Enforcement and Intelligence	August Pfluger (R-TX)	Seth Magaziner (D-RI)
Cybersecurity and Infrastructure Protection	Andrew Garbarino (R-NY)	Eric Swalwell (D-CA)
Emergency Management and Technology	Anthony D'Esposito (R-NY)	Troy Carter (D-LA)
Oversight, Investigations and Accountability	Dan Bishop (R-NC)	Glenn Ivey (D-MD)
Transportation and Maritime Security	Carlos A. Giménez (R-FL)	Shri Thanedar (D-MI)

== Committee leadership ==
Chairs
Name	Party	State	Start	End
Dick Armey	Republican	Texas	2002	2003
Chris Cox	Republican	California	2003	2005
Pete King	Republican	New York	2005	2007
Bennie Thompson	Democratic	Mississippi	2007	2011
Pete King	Republican	New York	2011	2013
Mike McCaul	Republican	Texas	2013	2019
Bennie Thompson	Democratic	Mississippi	2019	2023
Mark Green	Republican	Tennessee	2023	2025
Andrew Garbarino	Republican	New York	2025	present

Ranking members
Name	Party	State	Start	End
Nancy Pelosi	Democratic	California	2002	2003
Jim Turner	Democratic	Texas	2003	2005
Bennie Thompson	Democratic	Mississippi	2005	2007
Pete King	Republican	New York	2007	2011
Bennie Thompson	Democratic	Mississippi	2011	2019
Mike Rogers	Republican	Alabama	2019	2021
John Katko	Republican	New York	2019	2023
Bennie Thompson	Democratic	Mississippi	2023	present

== See also ==
- List of United States House of Representatives committees
- Final Report of the Task Force on Combating Terrorist and Foreign Fighter Travel
