= Nathan Small =

American politician

Member of the New Mexico House of Representatives from the 36th district
- Incumbent
- Assumed office January 2017
- Preceded by: Andy Nuñez

Personal details
- Party: Democratic
- Spouse: Xochitl Torres Small
- Education: College of Wooster (BA)

Nathan P. Small is an American politician serving as a member of the New Mexico House of Representatives from the 36th district.

== Education ==
Small earned a Bachelor of Arts degree in English and philosophy from the College of Wooster.

== Career ==
Small was previously a member of the Las Cruces, New Mexico City Council. He was elected to the New Mexico House for District 36 in 2016. He filed for reelection in 2018, winning with 59.9% of the general election vote. In the 57th New Mexico Legislature, Small serves as chair of the House Appropriations and Finance Committee, and as a member of the House Energy, Environment & Natural Resources Committee.

== Personal life ==
His wife, Xochitl Torres Small, was formerly the United States representative for New Mexico's 2nd congressional district from 2019 to 2021 and was the United States Deputy Secretary of Agriculture from 2023 to 2025.
