= Xochitl Torres Small =

American attorney and politician (born 1984)

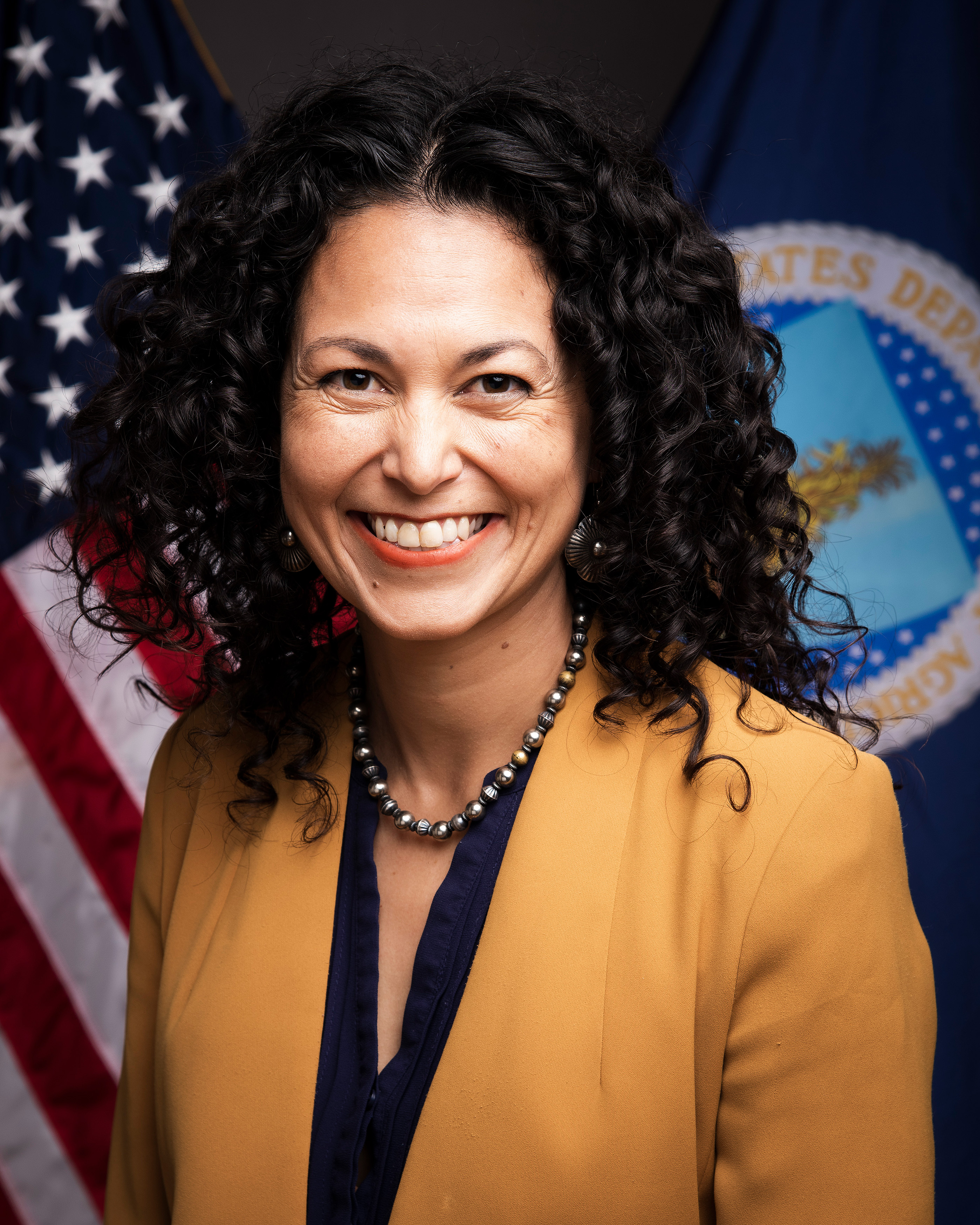
- Official portrait, 2023

15th United States Deputy Secretary of Agriculture
- In office July 17, 2023 – January 20, 2025
- President: Joe Biden
- Preceded by: Jewel H. Bronaugh
- Succeeded by: Stephen Vaden

Under Secretary of Agriculture for Rural Development
- In office October 13, 2021 – July 17, 2023
- President: Joe Biden
- Preceded by: Lisa Mensah (2017)
- Succeeded by: Basil Gooden

Member of the U.S. House of Representatives from New Mexico's 2nd district
- In office January 3, 2019 – January 3, 2021
- Preceded by: Steve Pearce
- Succeeded by: Yvette Herrell

Personal details
- Born: Xochitl Liana Torres; November 15, 1984 (age 42) Portland, Oregon, U.S.
- Party: Democratic
- Spouse: Nathan Small
- Education: Georgetown University (BS); University of New Mexico (JD)

Xochitl Liana Torres Small (first name pronounced /ˈsoʊtʃiːl/ SOH-cheel; born November 15, 1984) is an American attorney and politician who was the 15th United States deputy secretary of agriculture from 2023 to 2025, acting as "chief operating officer" for the department. She was nominated by President Joe Biden in February 2023, and was confirmed by the Senate on July 11.

She was the Under Secretary of Agriculture for Rural Development from 2021 to 2023 and had served as a U.S. representative for New Mexico's 2nd congressional district from 2019 to 2021.

== Early life and education ==
Xochitl Liana Torres was born on November 15, 1984, in Portland, Oregon, to Marcos and Cynthia "Cynta" Torres. Her parents were educators. Torres Small was raised in Las Cruces, New Mexico. She is a third-generation Mexican American.

Torres graduated from Mayfield High School in absentia while she earned her International Baccalaureate (IB) Diploma from Waterford Kamhlaba United World College of Southern Africa in Mbabane, Eswatini. She earned a Bachelor of Science in Foreign Service degree from Georgetown University, and a Juris Doctor degree from the University of New Mexico School of Law.

== Early career ==
Torres Small worked as a field representative for U.S. Senator Tom Udall from 2009 to 2012. She served as a federal law clerk in the New Mexico District from 2015 to 2016. She worked as a water attorney with the Kemp Smith law firm.

== U.S. House of Representatives ==
=== 2018 election ===
In the 2018 elections, Torres Small ran as a Democrat for the open United States House of Representatives seat in New Mexico's 2nd congressional district. The Republican incumbent, Steve Pearce, declined to run for reelection in order to run for governor of New Mexico. Torres Small defeated Madeline Hildebrandt in the Democratic Party primary election and Republican state Representative Yvette Herrell in the general election. She ran as a moderate Democrat.

The results were close on election night, with Herrell in the lead at the end of the night; some New Mexico media organizations projected that she would win. The next day, more ballots were counted, narrowing Herrell's lead, and media organizations rescinded their projections. On November 7, after all absentee ballots were counted, the New Mexico Secretary of State declared Torres Small the winner.

=== Tenure ===
In her first week in office, Torres Small and other members of the Congressional Hispanic Caucus (CHC) traveled to the United States Border Patrol station at Alamogordo, New Mexico, where Felipe Gómez Alonzo, an eight-year-old Guatemalan immigrant, died in custody.

In the 2020 presidential election, Torres Small said she would vote for Joe Biden despite disagreeing with some of his energy policy stances.

GovTrack reports that during her two years in Congress, Torres Small was the primary sponsor of three bills that became law, got her bills out of committee the tenth-most often of House freshmen and missed approximately 0.4% of House votes.

=== Committee assignments ===
- Committee on Armed Services
  - Subcommittee on Readiness
  - Subcommittee on Tactical Air and Land Forces
- Committee on Homeland Security
  - Subcommittee on Border Security, Facilitation and Operations
  - Subcommittee on Oversight, Management and Accountability (Chair)
- Committee on Agriculture
  - Subcommittee on Biotechnology, Horticulture, and Research
  - Subcommittee on General Farm Commodities and Risk Management

=== Caucus memberships ===
- Blue Dog Coalition
- Congressional Caucus for Women's Issues
- Congressional Hispanic Caucus
- New Democrat Coalition

=== 2020 election ===
Herrell ran again in 2020. During a debate in the campaign, she claimed to be "unashamedly pro-God, pro-life, pro-gun, pro-business and pro-family", while Torres Small touted her votes on oil and gas that bucked the Democratic Party's positions. OpenSecrets reports that Torres Small outspent Herrell by over $5 million.

Republicans targeted the seat as a pickup opportunity. Despite polling showing a dead heat, Herrell won 54% to 46%.

== U.S. Department of Agriculture ==
On June 18, 2021, it was announced that President Joe Biden would nominate Torres Small as Under Secretary for Rural Development at the United States Department of Agriculture. She was confirmed by voice vote on October 7, 2021.

On February 15, 2023, President Biden announced his intent to nominate Torres Small for United States deputy secretary of agriculture, and following a nomination hearing on May 10, she was confirmed on July 11 in a 84–8 vote. She was sworn into office on July 17, 2023.

== Electoral history ==
Democratic primary results
| Party | Candidate | Votes | % |
|---|---|---|---|
| Democratic | Xochitl Torres Small | 25,193 | 72.62 |
| Democratic | Madeline Hildebrandt | 9,500 | 27.38 |
| Total votes | | 34,693 | 100.00 |

New Mexico's 2nd congressional district, 2018
| Party | Candidate | Votes | % |
|---|---|---|---|
| Democratic | Xochitl Torres Small | 101,489 | 50.9 |
| Republican | Yvette Herrell | 97,767 | 49.1 |
| Total votes | | 199,256 | 100.0 |
| Democratic gain from Republican | | | |

New Mexico's 2nd congressional district election, 2020
| Party | Candidate | Votes | % |
|---|---|---|---|
| Republican | Yvette Herrell | 142,169 | 53.75 |
| Democratic | Xochitl Torres Small (incumbent) | 122,314 | 46.25 |
| Total votes | | 264,483 | 100.0 |
| Republican gain from Democratic | | | |

== Personal life ==
In 2016, Torres Small's husband, Nathan Small, was elected to the New Mexico House of Representatives, representing the 36th district. He ran for reelection in 2018, winning with 59.9% of the vote. She is a Lutheran.

== See also ==
- List of Hispanic and Latino Americans in the United States Congress
- Women in the United States House of Representatives

U.S. House of Representatives
| Preceded by Steve Pearce | Member of the U.S. House of Representatives from New Mexico's 2nd congressional district 2019–2021 | Succeeded by Yvette Herrell |
Political offices
| Preceded by Lisa Mensah | Under Secretary of Agriculture for Rural Development; 2021–2023 | Succeeded by Basil Gooden |
| Preceded by Jewel H. Bronaugh | United States Deputy Secretary of Agriculture; 2023–2025 | Succeeded by Stephen Vaden |
U.S. order of precedence (ceremonial)
| Preceded by Harry Teague as Former U.S. Representative | Order of precedence of the United States as Former U.S. Representative | Succeeded by Yvette Herrell as Former U.S. Representative |
