= Kathleen Rice =

American politician & lawyer (born 1965)

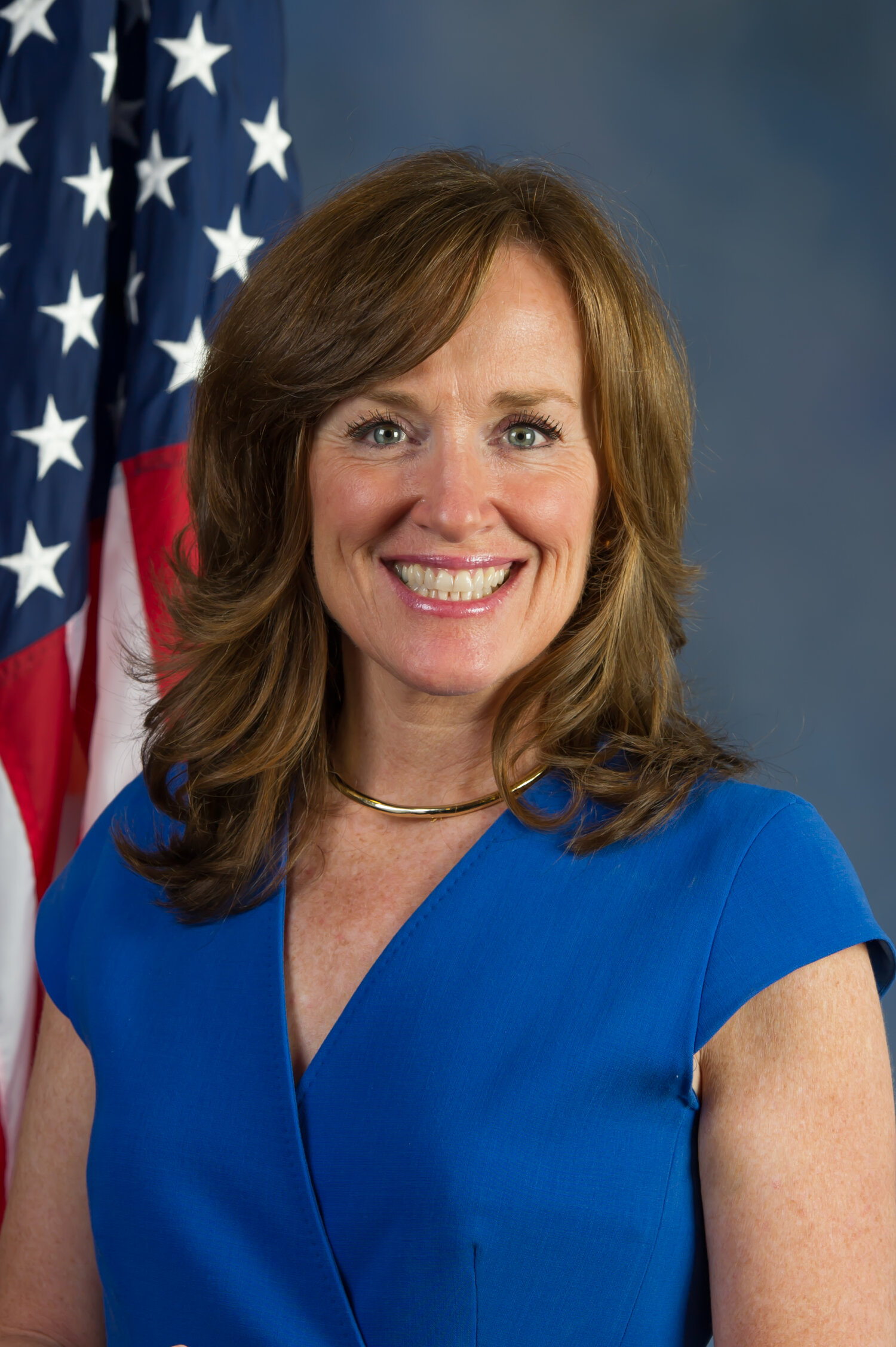
- Official portrait, 2016

Member of the U.S. House of Representatives from New York's 4th district
- In office January 3, 2015 – January 3, 2023
- Preceded by: Carolyn McCarthy
- Succeeded by: Anthony D'Esposito

District Attorney of Nassau County
- In office January 1, 2006 – January 3, 2015
- Preceded by: Denis E. Dillon
- Succeeded by: Madeline Singas

Personal details
- Born: Kathleen Maura Rice; February 15, 1965 (age 61) New York City, New York, U.S.
- Party: Republican (before 2005); Democratic (2005–present)
- Education: Catholic University (BA); Touro College (JD)

Kathleen Maura Rice (born February 15, 1965) is an American lawyer and politician who served as the United States representative for New York's 4th congressional district from 2015 to 2023. She is a member of the Democratic Party. Before serving in Congress, Rice served as the Nassau County district attorney, and, before that, she served as a federal prosecutor in the U.S. Attorney's Office in Philadelphia and as an assistant district attorney in the Kings County District Attorney's Office in New York City.

On January 29, 2014, Rice announced that she would run for Congress in New York's 4th congressional district to replace retiring Democratic incumbent Carolyn McCarthy. Rice defeated Republican nominee Bruce Blakeman on November 4, 2014, and took office in January 2015.

On February 15, 2022, Rice announced that she would retire at the end of her term.

== Early life, education, and career ==
Rice was born in Manhattan, New York, to Laurence and Christine Rice. She grew up in Garden City, on Long Island, as one of 10 siblings. Rice graduated from Garden City High School. She received a B.A. degree from the Catholic University in 1987 and a J.D. degree from the Touro Law Center in 1991.

In 1992 Rice began her career as an assistant district attorney in the Kings County District Attorney's Office, under District Attorney Charles J. Hynes. She prosecuted cases involving burglaries, robberies and sexual assaults and was the first member of her class to be promoted to the homicide bureau.

In 1999, Rice was appointed assistant United States Attorney in Philadelphia by then-Attorney General Janet Reno. As a federal prosecutor, she prosecuted white-collar crimes, corporate fraud, gun and drug cases, and public corruption.

== Nassau County District Attorney ==
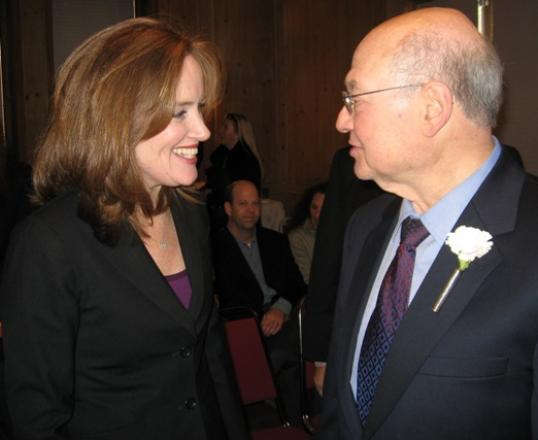
Rice with Gary Ackerman in 2010

Rice was elected Nassau County District Attorney in 2005, winning by 7,500 votes to become the first woman to hold the position. She defeated 30-year incumbent Denis E. Dillon, who had generally won reelection easily, even after switching his affiliation from Democratic to Republican in 1989. Rice was the first serious opponent Dillon had faced since his first run in 1974. Rice was reelected in 2009 and 2013.

=== Tenure and issues ===
==== Impaired driving ====
In 2006, Rice declared her first major policy initiative to be an "assault on the drunk driving epidemic". She lowered the blood-alcohol level at which plea bargains were offered, supported Leandra's Law, and charged a man with murder after a 2005 accident that killed a limo driver and a child.

==== Reform efforts ====
In September 2011, Rice's office arrested seven students after uncovering an SAT cheating ring on Long Island. When this case led to the discovery of a wider-spread cheating scandal, Rice worked with the College Board, which administers the test, to update security standards to halt cheating in the future. This effort sparked other test administrators, like that which gives the ACT, to update their standards as well.

Rice has also received credit for teen education programs geared toward cyberbullying, drug use, texting and dangerous driving.

In 2007, Rice's office, Nassau County and Hempstead police led a counter-assault on Terrace Avenue, a major drug haven and crime-ridden street in Long Island's Hempstead Village. Through a combination of zero-tolerance enforcement for repeat and violent offenders, and social-service based jail diversion for nonviolent and first time offenders, crime was reduced in the area.

In 2008, following the trampling death of a Walmart employee at one of its Black Friday sales events, Rice encouraged Walmart to upgrade its security protocols at its nearly 100 New York stores.

In 2012, Rice came out in favor of decriminalizing small amounts of "plain view" marijuana. She has also supported efforts to allow some citizens to seal prior low-level, non-violent convictions in the hopes of improving their chances of obtaining employment.

In the same year, then-Governor Andrew Cuomo chose Rice to be a member of the Moreland Commission on Utility Storm Preparation and Response, a panel tasked with investigating the failures of the Long Island Power Authority (LIPA) after Hurricane Sandy. The panel recommended that LIPA be replaced by a private, investor-owned company and that the Public Service Commission, which has regulation authority, be given more power to penalize and fine poor-performing utility companies.

Rice supports the "Raise the Age NY" initiative to treat nonviolent teen offenders as juveniles in the criminal justice system.

==== Guns, gangs, and violent crime ====
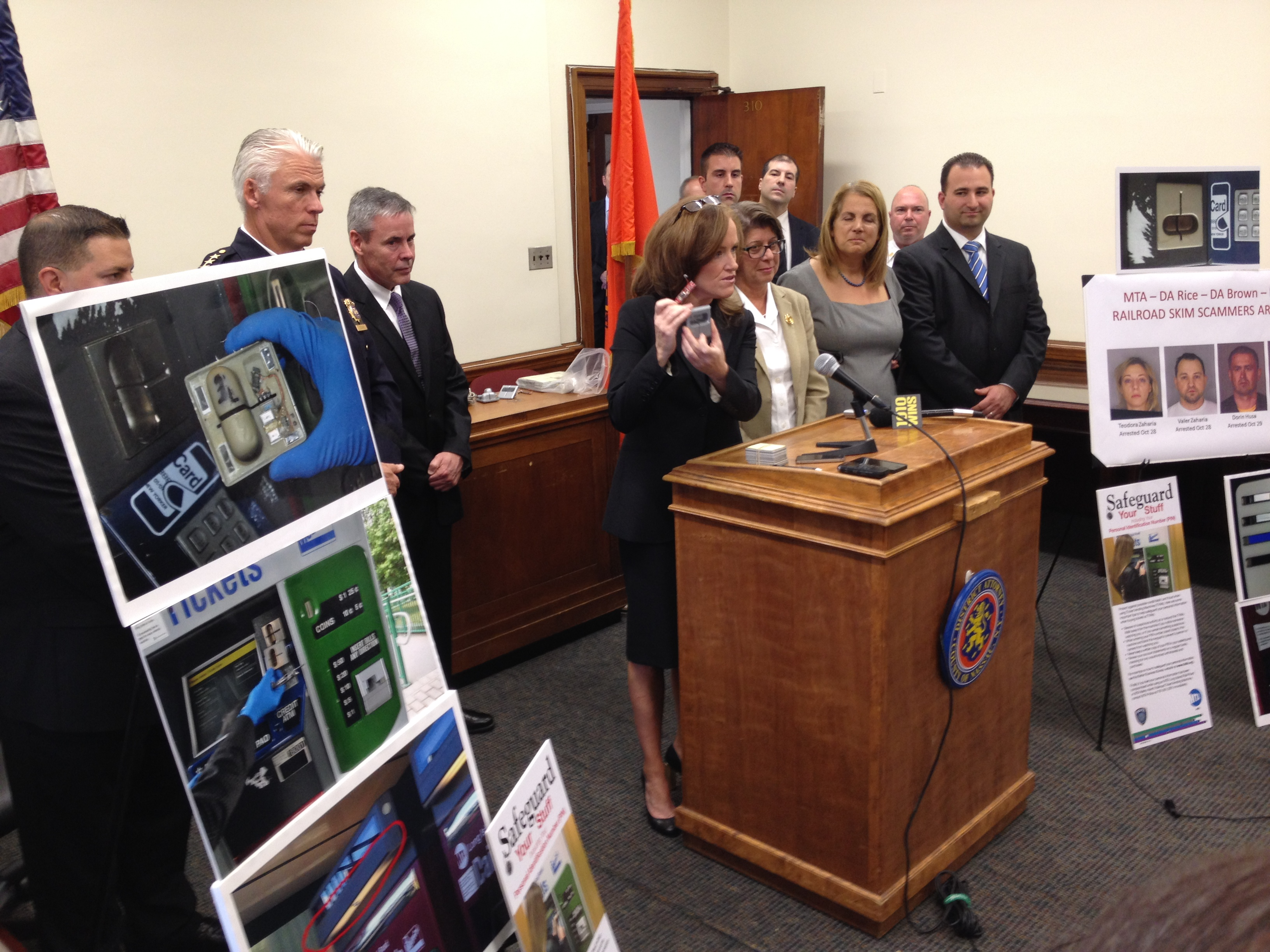
Kathleen Rice at a press conference, announcing the arrest of four ticket vending machine scammers (2013)

Rice implemented gun buyback programs in some of the county's most crime-plagued areas, which removed more than 2,000 guns from the streets. She also spoke out in favor of then-Governor Cuomo's gun control legislation and created the office's first ever gun prosecution unit.

In 2011 Rice announced a major prosecution of nine gun dealers and gun store employees police arrested in an undercover operation investigating alleged illegal assault weapons. This was the second arrest for Martin Tretola, one of the gun shop owners. He was previously arrested on firearms-related violations in 2007. In 2012, a federal jury delivered a verdict rejecting Nassau County's and Rice's charges for the 2007 arrest and awarded Tretola $3 million in compensatory damages and $2 million in punitive damages. This judgment was reduced to $1.3 million in total upon appeal.

==== Questions on Rice's early prosecution cases ====
The Kings County district attorney's prosecution of Antowine Butts for double homicide imploded and ended in an acquittal in 2000, but not before Butts spent two years in a Rikers Island jail cell. After the case unraveled, Butts alleged that he was a victim of prosecutorial misconduct in a civil rights lawsuit that was settled with New York City.

Rice was among those named in that suit, but has largely escaped attention for starting her career in an office in which prosecutors are alleged to have put some innocent people behind bars with coerced confessions, bogus witness statements, coached lineup identifications and other tactics.

In April 2013, Rice announced the arrest of 18 members of the "Rollin' 60's" gang, an "ultra-violent" subset of the Crips. Rice charged these defendants with crimes ranging from attempted murder of a police officer to assault and robbery to gun and drug sales.

==== Public corruption ====
Among those Rice has charged and convicted of corruption include a deputy police commissioner, a Long Beach City Council member, former Nassau County legislators, and several town building department employees.

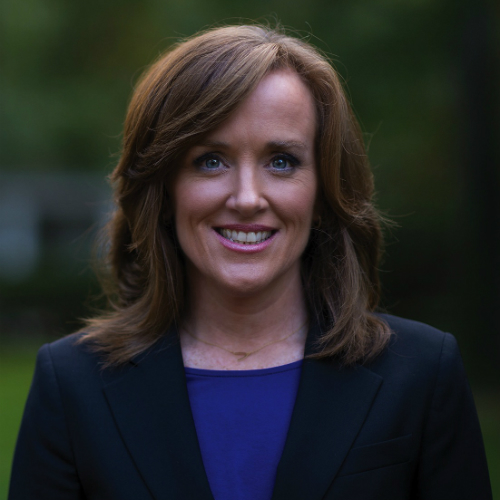
Rice in 2013

In July 2013, Cuomo appointed Rice to be one of three co-chairs of the Moreland Commission on Public Corruption. The commission's work is ongoing.

Rice formed Nassau's first-ever Medicaid and public assistance fraud unit, which has since secured millions of dollars in restitution for Nassau taxpayers.

==== Jesse Friedman case ====
In 2010, Rice ordered the review of a 1987 case in which Arnold Friedman and his son, Jesse, pleaded guilty to sexually abusing young boys in their Great Neck, Long Island home. Rice formed a panel of outside experts—including the Innocence Project's Barry Scheck (who spoke out against the review)—to examine whether Jesse Friedman had wrongfully confessed. In a 172-page report released in July 2013, investigators found that Friedman had not been wrongfully convicted.

=== President of DAASNY ===
In July 2013, Rice was inducted as president of the District Attorneys Association of the State of New York (DAASNY).

== U.S. House of Representatives ==
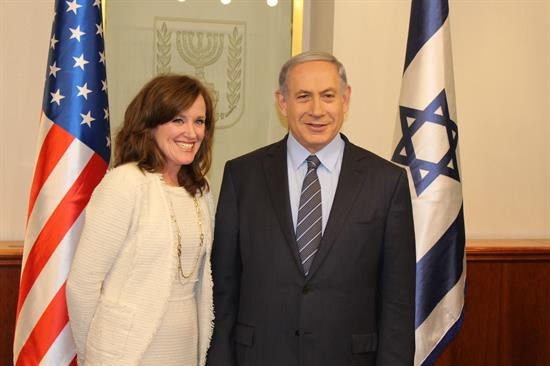
Rice with Israeli Prime Minister Benjamin Netanyahu in May 2015

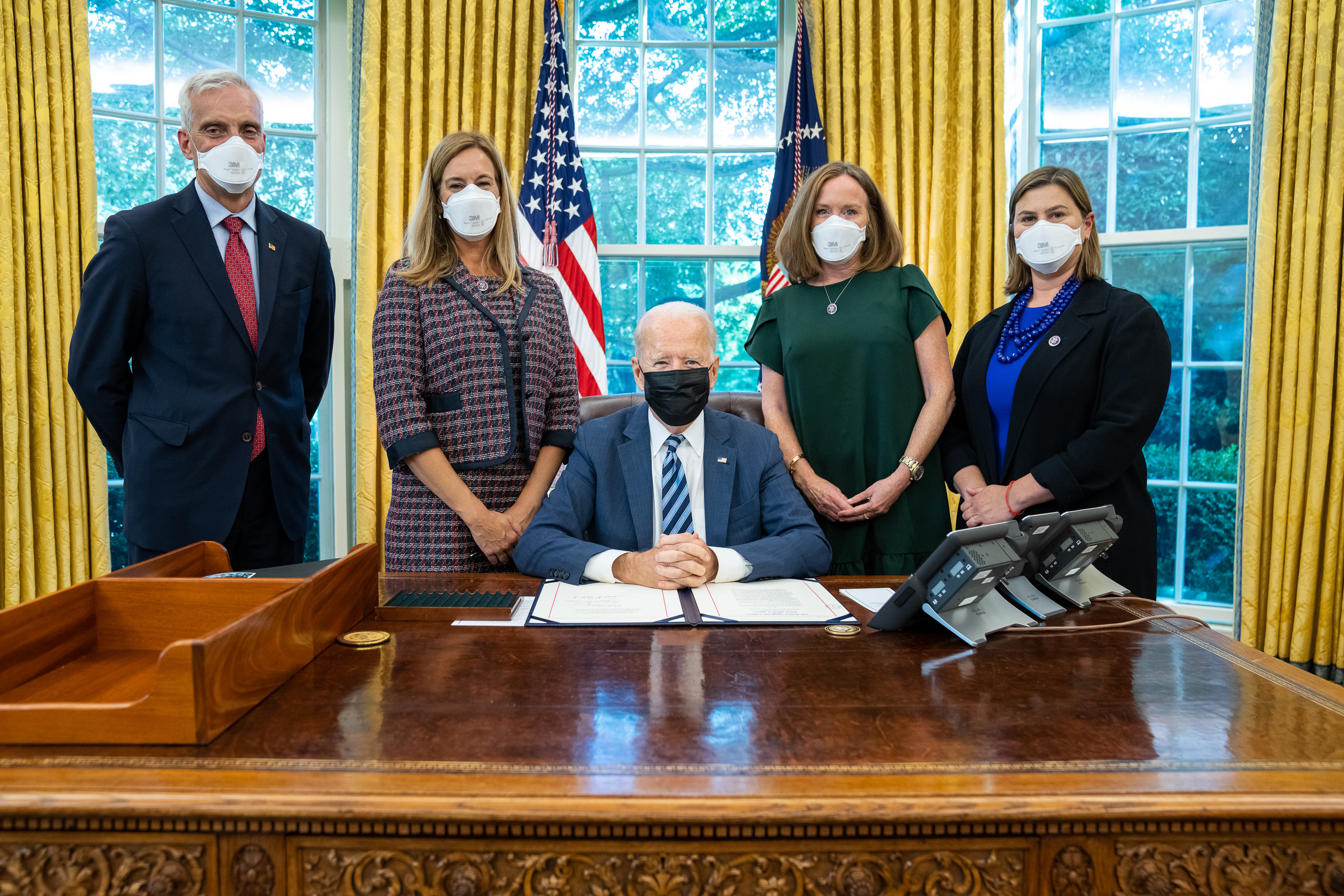
Rice with President Joe Biden, Denis McDonough, Mikie Sherrill, and Elissa Slotkin in 2021

=== Tenure ===
In an August 2017 tweet, Rice referred to both the National Rifle Association and its spokeswoman, conservative political commentator and author Dana Loesch, as national security threats under President Donald Trump. Loesch reacted to Rice's tweet by calling for her resignation.

As of September 2021, Rice had voted in line with Joe Biden's stated position 100% of the time.

Rice was one of three House Democrats on the Energy Committee to vote against a provision that would lower prescription drug prices.

In 2022, Rice criticized Democratic groups aiding far-right GOP primary candidates to make for easier opponents in November.

=== Committee assignments ===
- Committee on Homeland Security
  - Subcommittee on Cybersecurity, Infrastructure Protection, and Innovation
  - Subcommittee on Border Security, Facilitation, and Operations (Chair)
- Committee on Veterans' Affairs
  - Subcommittee on Economic Opportunity
  - Subcommittee on Oversight and Investigations

=== Caucus memberships ===
- New Democrat Coalition
- U.S.-Japan Caucus
- Congressional Taiwan Caucus

== Electoral history ==
=== 2005 Nassau County District Attorney election ===
In 2005, Rice returned to Nassau County and declared her candidacy for District Attorney on the Democratic line. She challenged 30-year incumbent Denis E. Dillon. Throughout the campaign, Rice provided an alternative to Dillon, pledging to cut plea bargaining and touting her would-be zero tolerance policy for drunk driving. She also committed herself to modernizing the office's approach to domestic violence and crimes of sexual abuse. Rice edged out Dillon, 51%–49%.

2005 Nassau County District Attorney General Election
Party	Candidate	Votes	%
Democratic	Kathleen Rice	151,819	51.35
Republican	Denis Dillon (inc.)	143,827	48.65
Total votes		295,646	100

=== 2009 Nassau County District Attorney election ===
In 2009, Rice was challenged by law clerk Joy Watson. She defeated Watson, 54%–46%.

2009 Nassau County District Attorney General Election
Party	Candidate	Votes	%
Democratic	Kathleen Rice (inc.)	129,508	54.2
Republican	Joy Watson	109,526	45.8
Total votes		239,034	100

=== 2010 New York State Attorney General Democratic primary ===
In May 2010, Rice announced that she would seek the Democratic nomination for New York State Attorney General. The race pitted Rice against four Democratic opponents: then-State Senator Eric Schneiderman, former prosecutor Sean Coffey, former State Assemblyman Richard Brodsky, and former insurance commissioner Eric Dinallo. Though originally considered a long shot, she lost the five-way primary to Schneiderman by just two points, 34% to 32%.

2010 New York State Attorney General Democratic Primary
Party	Candidate	Votes	%
Democratic	Eric T. Schneiderman	227,203	34.36
Democratic	Kathleen Rice	210,726	31.87
Democratic	Sean Coffey	108,185	16.36
Democratic	Richard L. Brodsky	65,683	9.93
Democratic	Eric R. Dinallo	49,499	7.49
Total votes		661,296	100

=== 2013 Nassau County District Attorney election ===
In 2013, Rice was challenged by Law Secretary Howard Sturim. Rice defeated Sturim, 59%–41%.

2013 Nassau County District Attorney General Election
Party	Candidate	Votes	%
Democratic	Kathleen Rice (inc.)	164,805	58.88
Republican	Howard Sturim	114,993	41.08
Total votes		279,888	100

=== 2014 U.S. House of Representatives New York's 4th District election ===
In June 2014, Rice won the Democratic primary election for the U.S. House of Representatives in New York's 4th congressional district, defeating Nassau County Legislator Kevan Abrahams, 56%–44%. In November, she was elected, defeating Republican nominee Bruce Blakeman, 53%–47%.

2014 U.S. House of Representatives (NY-04) General Election
Party	Candidate	Votes	%
Democratic	Kathleen Rice	85,294	52.66
Republican	Bruce Blakeman	76,515	47.24
Total votes		161,976	100

=== 2016 U.S. House of Representatives New York's 4th District election ===
Rice was reelected, defeating Republican nominee David Gurfein, 59.6%–40.4%, a margin of about 60,000 votes.

2016 U.S. House of Representatives (NY-04) General Election
Party	Candidate	Votes	%
Democratic	Kathleen Rice (inc.)	186,423	59.6
Republican	David Gurfein	126,438	40.4
Total votes		312,861	100

=== 2018 U.S. House of Representatives New York's 4th District election ===
Rice was reelected, defeating Republican nominee Ameer Benno, 61.3%–38.7%.

2018 U.S. House of Representatives (NY-04) General Election
Party	Candidate	Votes	%
Democratic	Kathleen Rice (inc.)	159,535	61.3
Republican	Ameer Benno	100,571	38.7
Total votes		260,106	100

=== 2020 U.S. House of Representatives New York's 4th District election ===
Rice was reelected, defeating Republican nominee Douglas L. Tuman and Green nominee Joseph R. Naham 56.1% to Tuman's 43.0% and Naham's 0.8%.

2020 U.S. House of Representatives (NY-04) General Election
Party	Candidate	Votes	%
Democratic	Kathleen Rice (inc.)	199,762	56.1
Republican	Douglas L. Tuman	153,007	43.0
Green	Joseph R. Naham	3,024	0.8
Total votes		355,912	100

== Personal life ==
Rice has never married and has no children. She is Roman Catholic.

== See also ==
- Women in the United States House of Representatives

U.S. House of Representatives
Preceded by Carolyn McCarthy	Member of the U.S. House of Representatives from New York's 4th congressional district 2015–2023	Succeeded by Anthony D'Esposito
U.S. order of precedence (ceremonial)
Preceded by John Katko as Former U.S. Representative	Order of precedence of the United States as Former U.S. Representative	Succeeded by Martin Lancaster as Former U.S. Representative
