= Eli Crane =

American politician (born 1980)

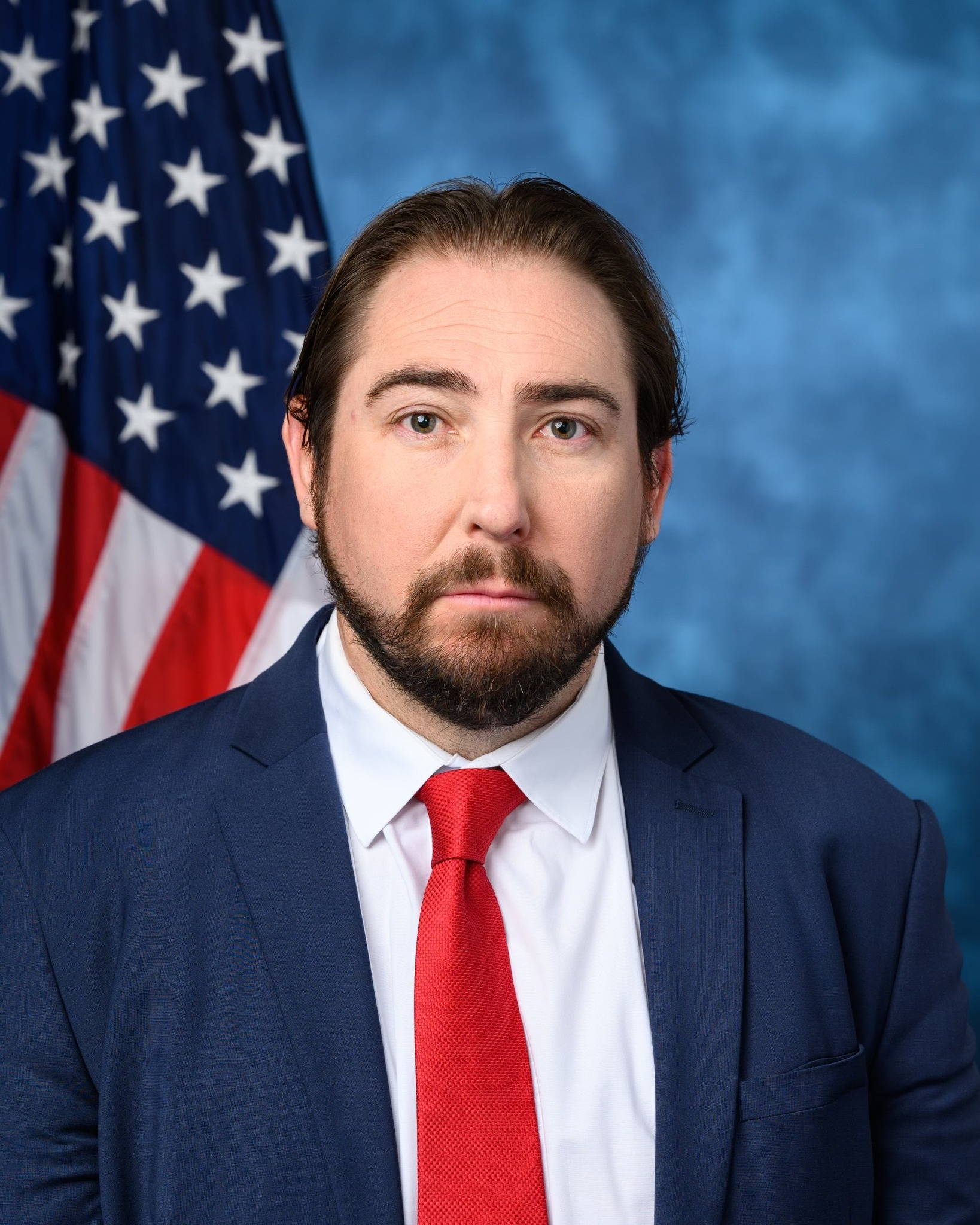
- Official portrait, 2023

Member of the U.S. House of Representatives from Arizona's 2nd district
- Incumbent
- Assumed office January 3, 2023
- Preceded by: Tom O'Halleran

Personal details
- Born: Elijah James Crane; January 3, 1980 (age 46) Tucson, Arizona, U.S.
- Party: Republican
- Spouse: Jen Crane
- Children: 2
- Education: Arizona Western College (attended); University of Arizona (attended)
- Website: House website Campaign website

Military service
- Allegiance: United States
- Branch/service: United States Navy
- Years of service: 2001–2014
- Unit: U.S. Navy SEALs; SEAL Team 3
- Battles/wars: Iraq War

Elijah James Crane (born January 3, 1980) is an American politician, businessman, and former United States Navy SEAL serving as the U.S. representative for Arizona's 2nd congressional district since 2023. He is a member of the Republican Party and the Freedom Caucus, the most conservative caucus.

Before entering politics, Crane served in the United States Navy and co-founded Bottle Breacher, which he sold in 2022. The company, which attracted financial support on a 2014 episode of Shark Tank, produced patriotic-themed bottle openers made from used bullets.

Crane was first elected to Congress in 2022, defeating Democratic incumbent Tom O'Halleran. He was re-elected in 2024 against Democratic nominee Jonathan Nez, the former Navajo Nation president.

== Early life and education ==
Crane was born in Tucson, Arizona, and raised in Yuma. His father worked as a pharmacist. Crane graduated from Cibola High School in 1998. He studied sociology at Arizona Western College and the University of Arizona, but did not graduate.

== Career ==
Crane stated that one week after the September 11 attacks, he dropped out of college and joined the United States Navy. He served in the Navy from 2001 to 2014. He was a member of the United States Navy SEALs and was deployed five times. Three of the five deployments were with the SEALS.

After leaving the military, Crane co-founded Bottle Breacher, a company that manufactures bottle openers made of bullet casings. He and his wife pitched the product on an episode of Shark Tank and received investments from Kevin O'Leary and Mark Cuban. Crane sold Bottle Breacher in 2022.

== U.S. House of Representatives ==
=== 2022 election ===
In 2022, Crane won the Republican nomination for Arizona's 2nd congressional district. The district had previously been the 1st, represented by three-term Democrat Tom O'Halleran. However, it had been made significantly more Republican in redistricting, with the addition of heavily Republican Prescott. Crane was endorsed by Donald Trump. Crane won the August Republican primary, defeating state representative Walter Blackman and others.

Crane promoted the conspiracy theory that there were "massive amounts of fraud" in the 2020 United States presidential election. Crane called upon the Arizona State Legislature to decertify Joe Biden's victory in the state, and for the attorney general of Arizona to launch a criminal investigation into alleged voter fraud. During the campaign, Crane eschewed the mainstream media, only granting interviews to conservative leaning publications and influencers. He also turned down an offer to debate O'Halloran.

In the general election, Crane unseated O'Halleran by a 54% to 46% margin.

=== Tenure ===
Crane did not support Kevin McCarthy for House speaker, and was one of six Republicans to vote against him on every ballot in the initial speaker election in 2023. In the 15th and final round of voting, Crane dropped his support for a different candidate and voted "present". He would later be one of eight Republicans to support the removal of Kevin McCarthy from the speakership.

==== Foreign policy ====
In 2023, Crane voted to cut off all military aid to Ukraine. In 2026, Crane introduced an amendment to the National Defense Authorization Act that would have blocked Department of Defense funding from going to Ukraine; the amendment failed by a 76-350 vote.

Crane voted to provide Israel with support following the 2023 Hamas attack on Israel.

In a 2025 House subcommittee hearing on U.S. national security featuring "a panel of mostly hawkish experts", Crane quoted John Quincy Adams, saying "The United States have no business in making conquests, nor in aspiring to any kind of empire." Crane added, "Does it concern you guys that we're $36 trillion in debt, (with an) annual deficit of $2 trillion as we sit here and talk about the United States' global involvement? Do any of you guys wonder when that tipping point is going to be?"

In March 2026, after the second Trump administration launched the 2026 Iran war, Crane said "I'm really, really hopeful this doesn't turn into a boots-on-the-ground situation. My biggest concern this whole time is that this would turn into another long Middle Eastern war. Though I don't want to try and take away any of the president's ability to carry out this operation, I know a lot of our supporters and a lot of members of Congress are very concerned." In June 2026, he voted against a war powers resolution that would have limited the war in Iran until congressional authorization for it was obtained.

==== Fiscal Responsibility Act of 2023 ====
Crane was among the 71 Republicans and 46 Democrats who voted against final passage of the Fiscal Responsibility Act of 2023 in the House.

==== Conspiracy theories on the Trump assassination attempts ====
On multiple occasions, Crane has promoted conspiracy theories about both of the 2024 assassination attempts against Donald Trump, in Pennsylvania in July and in Florida in September. For the first attempted assassination, Crane has promoted the conspiracy theory that the gunman did not act alone, and for the second attempted assassination, Crane has promoted the conspiracy theory that the gunman was an "asset" of a foreign adversary.

==== Attempted impeachment of federal judge Paul Engelmayer ====
In February 2025, Crane introduced articles of impeachment against U.S. District Judge Paul Engelmayer of the Southern District of New York, accusing him of judicial overreach for blocking the Trump administration's Department of Government Efficiency (DOGE) from accessing the individual financial records in the Treasury Department of Americans. The following month, Elon Musk, who leads DOGE, contributed the maximum allowable donation to Crane and other Republicans who supported the impeachment of federal judges who had ruled against the Trump administration.

==== Immigration and Islam ====
In January 2026, Crane was named a founding member of the Sharia-Free America Caucus in Congress, which seeks to ban Sharia law. He said, "this authoritarian ideology cannot coexist with Western values. It's imperative that we learn from Europe's failed policies and never surrender to this growing threat." The Council on American–Islamic Relations (CAIR), a civil rights organization, quoted Crane and other House members in a statement designating the Sharia-Free America Caucus an anti-Muslim hate group and saying the caucus's agenda "would effectively ban the practice of the world's second largest religion in the United States."

==== Affordable Care Act ====
In 2026, Crane voted against extending the Affordable Care Act enhanced tax credits.

=== Committee assignments ===
For the 119th Congress:

- Committee on Homeland Security
  - Subcommittee on Border Security and Enforcement
  - Subcommittee on Transportation and Maritime Security
- Committee on Oversight and Government Reform
  - Subcommittee on Cybersecurity, Information Technology, and Government Innovation
  - Subcommittee on Military and Foreign Affairs

=== Caucus memberships ===
- Freedom Caucus
- Congressional Western Caucus
- Sharia-Free America Caucus

== Personal life ==
Crane is Protestant. He lives in Oro Valley in Pima County, Arizona, which is part of the state's neighboring 6th congressional district. He is married to Jen Crane and has two daughters.

He has served as a brand ambassador for Sig Sauer firearms.

== Electoral history ==
=== 2022 ===
2022 Arizona's 2nd congressional district Republican primary
Party	Candidate	Votes	%
Republican	Eli Crane	38,681	35.8
Republican	Walter Blackman	26,399	24.4
Republican	Mark DeLuzio	18,515	17.1
Republican	Andy Yates	7,467	6.9
Republican	John W. Moore	7,327	6.8
Republican	Steve Krystofiak	5,905	5.5
Republican	Ron Watkins	3,810	3.5
Total votes		108,104	100

2022 Arizona's 2nd congressional district election
Party	Candidate	Votes	%
Republican	Eli Crane	174,169	53.9
Democratic	Tom O'Halleran (incumbent)	149,151	46.1
Independent	Chris Sarappo (write-in)	76	0.0
Total votes		323,396	100
Republican gain from Democratic			

=== 2024 ===
2024 Arizona's 2nd congressional district Republican primary
Party	Candidate	Votes	%
Republican	Eli Crane	56,354	79
Republican	Jack Smith	15,013	21.0
Total votes		71,367	100

2024 Arizona's 2nd congressional district election
Party	Candidate	Votes	%
Republican	Eli Crane (incumbent)	221,413	54.5%
Democratic	Jonathan Nez	184,963	45.5%
Write-in		55	0.01%
Total votes		406,431	100.00%

== See also ==
- List of United States Navy SEALs

U.S. House of Representatives
Preceded by Ann Kirkpatrick	Member of the U.S. House of Representatives from Arizona's 2nd congressional district 2023–present	Incumbent
U.S. order of precedence (ceremonial)
Preceded by Mike Collins	United States representatives by seniority 300th	Succeeded by Jasmine Crockett
