= John Katko =

American politician and attorney (born 1962)

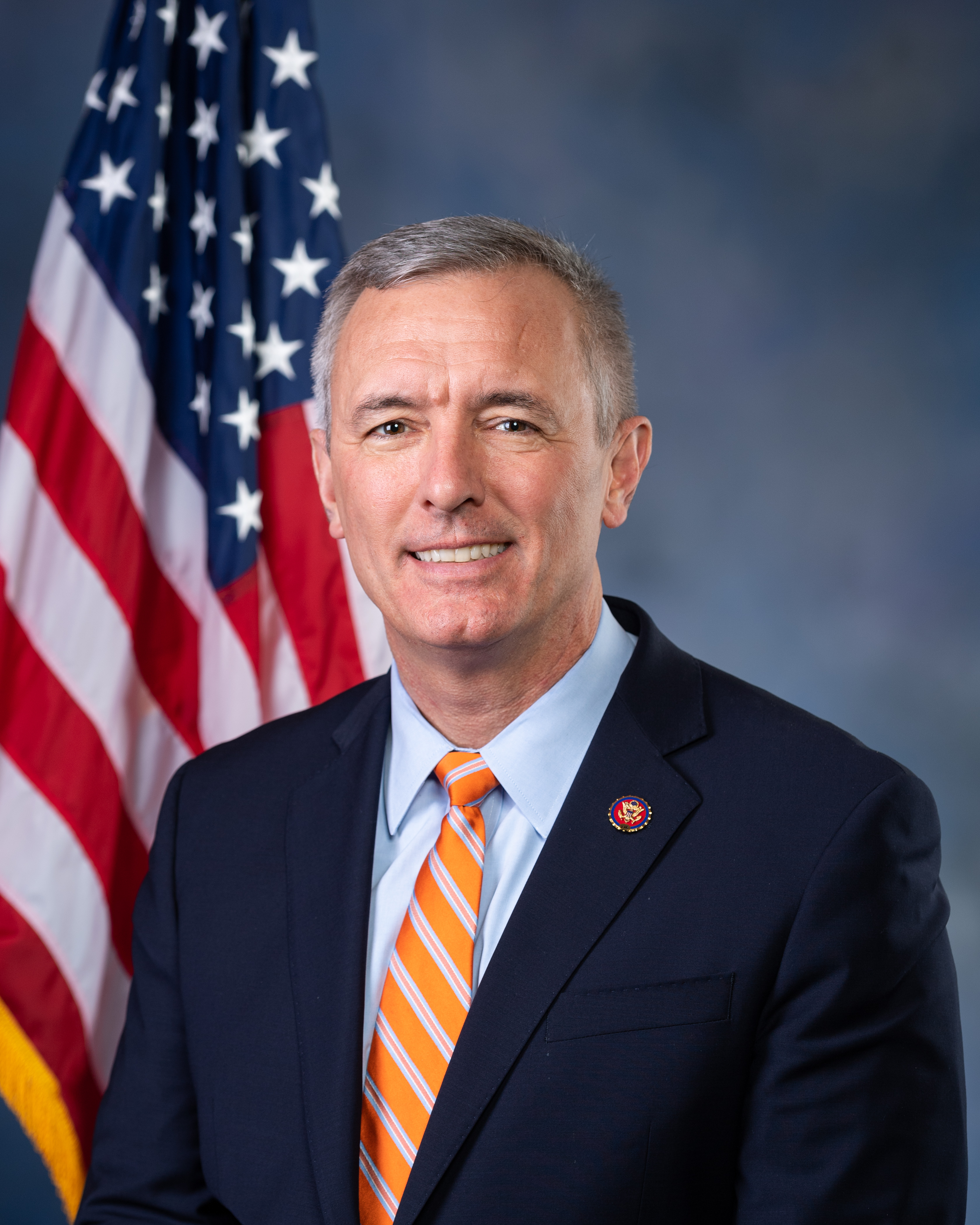
- Official portrait, 2019

Ranking Member of the House Homeland Security Committee
- In office January 3, 2021 – January 3, 2023
- Preceded by: Mike Rogers
- Succeeded by: Bennie Thompson

Member of the U.S. House of Representatives from New York's 24th district
- In office January 3, 2015 – January 3, 2023
- Preceded by: Dan Maffei
- Succeeded by: Brandon Williams (redistricted)

Personal details
- Born: John Michael Katko; November 9, 1962 (age 63) Syracuse, New York, U.S.
- Party: Republican
- Spouse: Robin Gibson (m. 1987)
- Children: 3
- Education: Niagara University (BA); Syracuse University (JD)
- Katko's voice Katko honoring James Tormey, a deceased state judge. Recorded June 26, 2019

John Michael Katko (/ˈkætkoʊ/; born November 9, 1962) is an American attorney and politician who served as the U.S. representative for New York's 24th congressional district, based in Syracuse, from 2015 to 2023. A member of the Republican Party, he previously was an Assistant United States Attorney who led the organized crime division at the U.S. Attorney's Office in Syracuse. In that role, he helped to prosecute gang members under the Racketeer Influenced and Corrupt Organizations Act.

In the 116th Congress, he was a co-chair of the House moderate Republican faction, the Tuesday Group. He was the sole chair of the renamed Republican Governance Group for the 117th Congress. Katko was one of ten House Republicans who voted to impeach then-President Donald Trump during Trump's second impeachment.

On January 14, 2022, Katko announced that he would not seek reelection in 2022. In January 2023, he was named a senior advisor for the Washington, DC–based lobbying and consulting firm Hill East Group.

== Early life and education ==
Katko was born in Syracuse in 1962 and is a 1980 graduate of Bishop Ludden High School. He is of Slovak descent on his father's side.

Katko attended Niagara University, where he earned a Bachelor of Arts degree in political science in 1984. He earned his Juris Doctor from Syracuse University College of Law in 1988.

== Legal career ==
Katko first entered private practice at a firm in Washington, D.C. Shortly thereafter he became a senior trial attorney in the Enforcement Division of the U.S. Securities and Exchange Commission. He then spent 20 years as an Assistant United States Attorney in the United States Department of Justice. He served as a senior trial attorney on the Mexico–United States border in El Paso, Texas, and he was later assigned to San Juan, Puerto Rico. In April 2000, a Department of Justice-issued handgun was stolen from Katko's vehicle and used in a robbery in which two people were killed. Katko had been issued the gun after receiving a threat against his life. The Syracuse Post-Standard later reported about the episode: "Katko broke no state or federal gun laws, and he was not disciplined by the Justice Department."

After leaving the Department of Justice, Katko moved to Camillus, New York, and spent 15 years working as a federal organized crime prosecutor in Syracuse, New York for the U.S. Attorney's Office in the Northern District of New York. In this role, he "led high-level narcotics prosecutions and was instrumental in formulating the Syracuse Gang Violence Task Force and successfully prosecuting the first-ever RICO gang case in the City of Syracuse, which led to a significant drop in the city's violent crime rate." He "also prosecuted political and police corruption cases." He retired from the Department of Justice in January 2013.

== U.S. House of Representatives ==
=== Elections ===
==== 2014 ====
Katko challenged incumbent Representative Dan Maffei in the 2014 United States House of Representatives elections and was declared the winner on November 4th 60% to 40%. This was the largest margin of defeat suffered by an incumbent in the 2014 election cycle.

==== 2016 ====
Katko ran for reelection in 2016. He ran unopposed in the Republican primary. He faced Democratic nominee Colleen Deacon, U.S. Senator Kirsten Gillibrand's former district director for Central New York, in the November general election. Katko was reelected with 61% of the vote, even as Donald Trump lost this district by four points in the concurrent presidential election.

==== 2018 ====
National Democrats thought that this was one of the seats that they should have a chance at winning because Democratic presidential candidate Hillary Clinton won this district by four points in the 2016 election. The 2018 election was also heavily favored for the Democrats. In May 2018, The New York Times reported that the Democratic primary contest had attracted interest around the country. On June 26, 2018, Dana Balter, with 63% of the vote, defeated Juanita Perez Williams, with 37%, in the Democratic primary. Katko defeated Balter with 52.6% of the vote in the November general election.

==== 2020 ====
Katko was reelected in 2020 with 53% of the vote, but on January 3, 2022, the New York Independent Redistricting Commission proposed combining Ithaca, Syracuse, and Utica into one congressional district (the 24th); under that plan, Katko would likely have to face Claudia Tenney, who currently represents the 22nd district, in a primary.

=== Tenure ===
In 2016, eight Katko-sponsored bills passed the House; one became law. Katko had more bills pass the House that year than any other member of the 61-member freshman class elected in 2014.

On December 18, 2019, Katko voted against both articles of impeachment against Trump. Of the 195 House Republicans who voted, all voted against both impeachment articles, as did one Democrat.

On January 12, 2021, Katko became the first House Republican to say he would vote to impeach Trump in the pending vote on a second impeachment. This came in the aftermath of allegations that Trump incited a mob to storm the U.S. Capitol building. In a statement, Katko faulted Trump for fostering the environment that led to the attack and failing to "promptly and forcefully call it off." He believed that if Trump were not held to account for this behavior, it would pose "a direct threat to the future of our democracy." Earlier, Katko had blamed Trump for the storming, saying the president's false claims of election fraud "incited and encouraged this unlawful and unpatriotic attack." As a result, Katko said, he could no longer support Trump. He joined nine other Republicans in supporting impeachment on January 13.

On February 4, 2021, Katko joined 10 other Republican House members voting with all voting Democrats to strip Marjorie Taylor Greene of her House Education and Labor Committee and House Budget Committee assignments in response to controversial political statements she had made.

In March 2021, Katko voted against the American Rescue Plan Act of 2021.

On November 5, 2021, Katko was one of 13 House Republicans to vote for the Infrastructure Investment and Jobs Act.

On January 14, 2022, Katko announced that he would not seek reelection in 2022, citing a desire to spend more time with his family. At the time, Katko was in line to chair the House Homeland Security Committee if Republicans were to win a majority in the 2022 elections. But CNN reported that perhaps also factoring into Katko's decision was that he had become a target on the right due to his support of Trump's second impeachment, the Infrastructure Investment and Jobs Act, and the creation of an independent and bipartisan commission to investigate the circumstances of the January 6 insurrection.

=== Record on bipartisanship ===
Katko had often been ranked among the most bipartisan members of the House. In 2018, he was ranked the seventh-most bipartisan member of the House during the 115th United States Congress. He had voted in support of Trump's position 75.6% of the time. In the 116th United States Congress, the Lugar Center ranked Katko the second most bipartisan member of the House. The Center for Effective Lawmaking, at Vanderbilt University and the University of Virginia, ranked him as the third-most effective House Republican in 2021. In the 117th United States Congress, Katko is the third most bipartisan member of the Republican caucus. As of November 27, 2021, he has supported President Joe Biden’s position 43% of the time.

=== Caucus memberships ===
- Republican Main Street Partnership
- Republican Governance Group (Chair)
- Problem Solvers Caucus

=== Committee assignments ===
- Committee on Transportation and Infrastructure
- Committee on Homeland Security
  - As Ranking Member of the committee as a whole, Katko serves as an ex officio member on all subcommittees.

== Political positions ==
=== Abortion ===
Katko opposes abortion. In 2014, he said he would reverse the Roe v. Wade 1973 Supreme Court decision if he could. He has voted multiple times to defund Planned Parenthood. Katko said that he favored funding for Planned Parenthood until the Planned Parenthood 2015 undercover videos controversy, during which anti-abortion activists claimed that the videos showed Planned Parenthood illegally selling fetal tissue, a claim found to be false. During his 2014 campaign, Katko said he would not defund the organization. At the time of the vote, he said he could not support additional funding of the organization while an investigation into its practices was ongoing.

Katko voted for H.R. 8373: The Right to Contraception Act. This bill was designed to protect access to contraceptives and health care providers' ability to provide contraceptives and information related to contraception. It would also fund Planned Parenthood.

=== Budget ===
In February 2018, Katko supported the Bipartisan Budget Act, saying that it would bring $1.4 million to Oswego Health in his district.

=== Civil rights ===
In 2019, Katko co-sponsored legislation to extend the protections of the Civil Rights Act of 1964 to people regardless of sexual orientation or gender identity.

=== Health insurance ===
In 2017, Katko was one of only 20 Republicans to vote against the GOP Healthcare Bill. The act passed the House by a margin of 217–213.

In 2019, Katko voted with seven other Republicans to pass a resolution condemning the Trump administration's efforts by Department of Justice to have the courts invalidate the Affordable Care Act.

=== January 6 commission ===
On May 14, 2021, Katko and Representative Bennie Thompson, the House Homeland Security Committee chair, announced that they had struck a deal to create the January 6 commission, a bipartisan, independent commission meant to investigate the storming of the U.S. Capitol. The specifics of the commission's scope had been a topic of strong debate between Democratic and Republican leaders in Congress. On May 19, Katko became one of 35 Republicans who joined all 217 Democrats present in voting to establish the commission.

=== Parental savings accounts ===
In 2016, with Representative Kyrsten Sinema of Arizona, Katko cosponsored the Working Parents Flexibility Act (H.R. 4699). This legislation would establish a tax-free "parental savings account" in which employers and parents could invest savings tax-free, with unused funds eligible to be "rolled into qualifying retirement, college savings or ABLE accounts for people with disabilities without tax penalties."

=== School safety ===
After the shooting in Parkland, Florida, in February 2018, Katko and Representative Henry Cuellar introduced the Securing Our Children Act of 2018, which would create a commission tasked with developing school safety and security policy.

=== Steve Bannon ===
On October 21, 2021, Katko was one of nine House Republicans who voted to hold Steve Bannon in contempt of Congress.

=== LGBT rights ===
In 2022, Katko was one of six Republicans to vote for the Global Respect Act, which imposes sanctions on foreign persons responsible for violations of the internationally recognized human rights of lesbian, gay, bisexual, transgender, queer, and intersex (LGBTQI) people, and for other purposes. In July 2022, he was one of 47 Republicans to vote for the Respect for Marriage Act, which would codify same-sex marriage into law and passed the House, 267–157.

== Post-congressional life ==
In January 2023, Katko joined the HillEast Group, a lobbying and communications firm in Washington, D.C., as a senior adviser.

== Personal life ==
Katko was raised in suburban Camillus, New York, where he resides with his wife, Robin, and their three sons.

Katko is Roman Catholic.

== See also ==
- Final Report of the Task Force on Combating Terrorist and Foreign Fighter Travel

U.S. House of Representatives
Preceded by Dan Maffei	Member of the U.S. House of Representatives from New York's 24th congressional district 2015–2023	Succeeded by Claudia Tenney
Party political offices
Preceded by Tom MacArthur	Chair of the Republican Governance Group; Tuesday Group: 2017–2020; 2017–2022; Served alongside: Charlie Dent (2017–2018), Elise Stefanik (2017–2019), Susan Brooks (2019–2021), Fred Upton (2019–2021)	Succeeded by Dave Joyce
U.S. order of precedence (ceremonial)
Preceded by John E. Sweeney as Former U.S. Representative	Order of precedence of the United States as Former U.S. Representative	Succeeded by Kathleen Rice as Former U.S. Representative
