= 2026 United States House of Representatives elections in Mississippi =

- November 3, 2026

All 4 Mississippi seats to the United States House of Representatives
	Majority party	Minority party
Party	Republican	Democratic
Last election	3	1
Seats won	3	1
Seat change	Steady	Steady
Popular vote	492,729	447,938
Percentage	51.33%	46.67%
Swing	▼18.55%	▲16.55%

Republican
40–50%
50–60%
60–70%
70–80%
80–90%
Democratic
40–50%
50–60%
60–70%
70–80%
80–90%

The 2026 United States House of Representatives elections in Mississippi were held on November 3, 2026 to elect the four U.S. representatives from the state of Mississippi, one from all four of the state's congressional districts. The elections coincided with other elections to the House of Representatives, elections to the United States Senate, and various state and local elections. The primary elections took place on March 10, 2026, and in races where no candidate received over 50% in a primary, runoff elections took place on April 7, 2026.

== Statewide polling ==
=== Statewide congressional polls ===
Poll source	Date(s) administered	Sample size (Note: Key: A – all adults RV – registered voters LV – likely voters V – unclear)	Margin of error	Republican	Democratic	Undecided
Data for Progress (D) (Note: Poll sponsored by Way to Lead PAC, which supports Democrats)	August 5–15, 2026	1,018 (LV)	± 3.0%	52%	42%	6%

== District 1 ==
2026 Mississippi's 1st congressional district
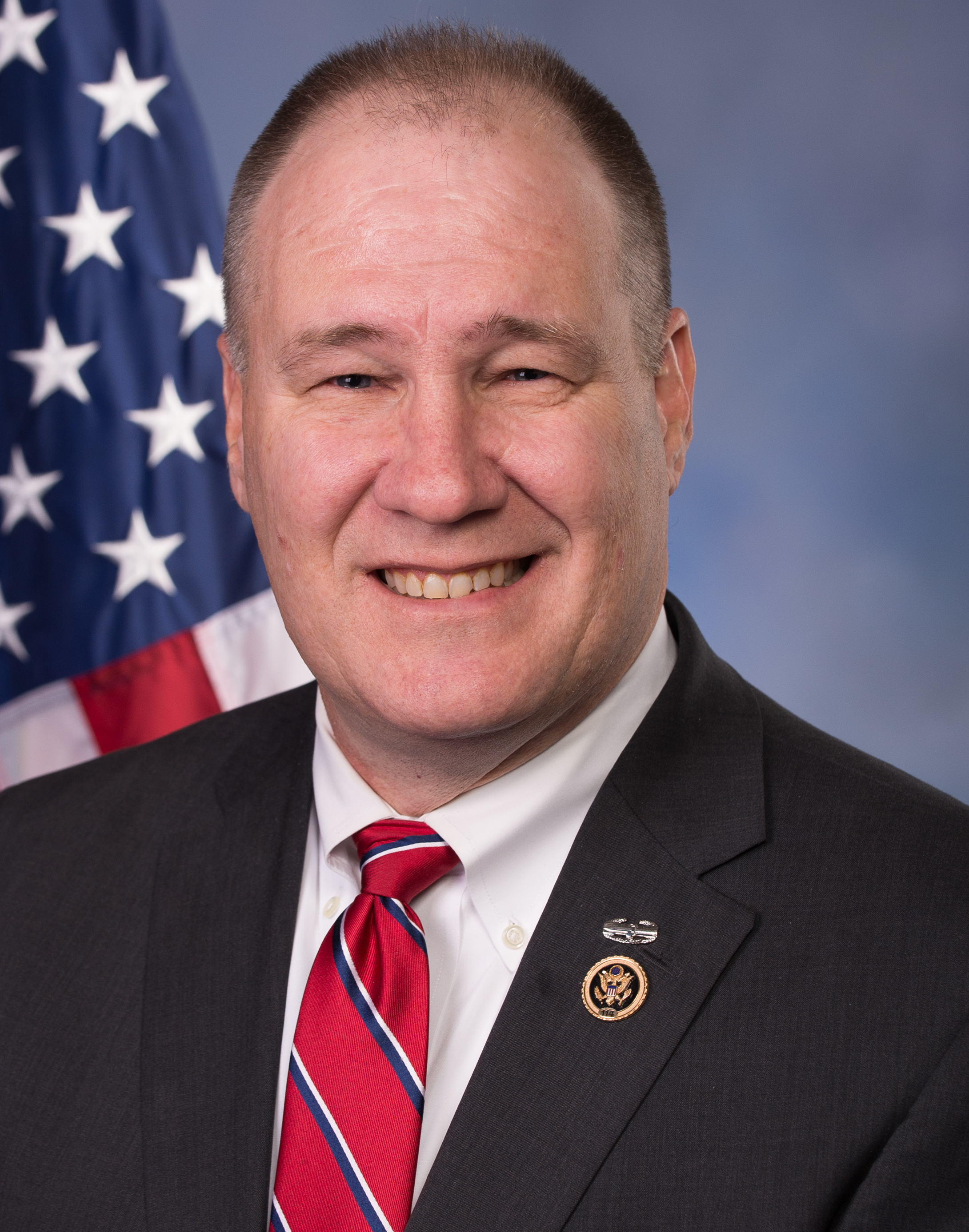

Nominee	Trent Kelly	Cliff Johnson
Party	Republican	Democratic
Popular vote	141,401	99,147
Percentage	58.0%	40.6%
- County results Kelly: 50–60% 60–70% 70–80% 80–90% Johnson: 50–60% 60–70%
U.S. representative before election
Trent Kelly
Republican
Elected U.S. representative
Trent Kelly
Republican

The 1st district takes in the northeastern area of the state, including Columbus, Oxford, Southaven, and Tupelo. The incumbent is Republican Trent Kelly, who was re-elected with 69.8% of the vote in 2024.

=== Republican primary ===
==== Nominee ====
- Trent Kelly, incumbent U.S. representative

==== Endorsements ====
Trent Kelly

Executive branch officials

- Donald Trump, president of the United States (2017–2021, 2025–present)

Organizations

- AIPAC

==== Fundraising ====
Campaign finance reports as of February 18, 2026
Candidate	Raised	Spent	Cash on hand
Trent Kelly (R)	$663,954	$534,837	$737,975
Source: Federal Election Commission

==== Results ====
Republican primary results
Party	Candidate	Votes	%
Republican	Trent Kelly (incumbent)	35,490	100.0
Total votes		35,490	100.0

=== Democratic primary ===
==== Nominee ====
- Cliff Johnson, director of the MacArthur Justice Center at the University of Mississippi School of Law

==== Eliminated in primary ====
- Kelvin Buck, former mayor of Holly Springs (2013–2021) and former state representative from the 5th district (2004–2013)

==== Endorsements ====
Cliff Johnson

U.S. representatives

- Bennie Thompson, MS-02 (1993–present)

State legislators

- Theresa Gillespie Isom, state senator from the 2nd district (2025–present)

Labor unions

- Mississippi AFL-CIO

Organizations

- Indivisible DeSoto

==== Fundraising ====
Campaign finance reports as of February 18, 2026
Candidate	Raised	Spent	Cash on hand
Kelvin Buck (D) (Note: As last reported on December 31, 2025)	$29,190	$15,675	$13,514
Cliff Johnson (D)	$304,590	$239,300	$65,290
Source: Federal Election Commission

==== Results ====
Results by county Johnson: 50–60%; 60–70%; 70–80%; Buck: 50–60%; 60–70%

Democratic primary results
Party	Candidate	Votes	%
Democratic	Cliff Johnson	18,051	63.4
Democratic	Kelvin Buck	10,426	36.6
Total votes		28,477	100.0

=== Libertarian primary ===
==== Declared ====
- Johnny Baucom, health and safety technician

=== General election ===
==== Predictions ====
Source	Ranking	As of
Decision Desk HQ	Safe R	July 14, 2026
The Cook Political Report	Solid R	March 13, 2025
Inside Elections	Solid R	March 7, 2025
Sabato's Crystal Ball	Safe R	July 15, 2025

==== Post-primary endorsements ====
Trent Kelly (R)

Organizations

- U.S. Chamber of Commerce

==== Fundraising ====
Campaign finance reports as of June 30, 2026
Candidate	Raised	Spent	Cash on hand
Trent Kelly (R)	$1,004,204	$749,398	$863,664
Cliff Johnson (D)	$551,243	$401,598	$149,644
Source: Federal Election Commission

==== Results ====
2026 Mississippi's 1st congressional district election
Party	Candidate	Votes	%	±%
Republican	Trent Kelly (incumbent)	141,401	58.0	–11.8
Democratic	Cliff Johnson	99,147	40.6	+10.4
Libertarian	Johnny Baucom	3,390	1.4	N/A
Total votes		243,938	100	

== District 2 ==
2026 Mississippi's 2nd congressional district
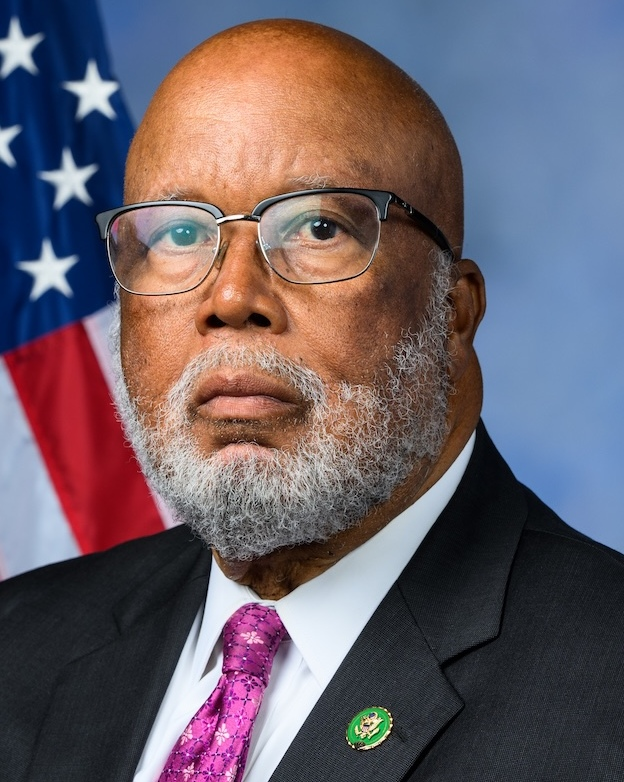

Nominee	Bennie Thompson	Ron Eller
Party	Democratic	Republican
Popular vote	169,048	73,941
Percentage	67.9%	29.7%
- County results Thompson: 40–50% 50–60% 60–70% 70–80% 80–90% Eller: 40–50% 50–60% 60–70%
U.S. Representative before election
Bennie Thompson
Democratic
Elected U.S. Representative
Bennie Thompson
Democratic

The 2nd district encompasses the Mississippi Delta, taking in most of Jackson, the riverfront cities of Greenville, Natchez and Vicksburg, and the interior market cities of Clarksdale, Greenwood and Clinton. The incumbent is Democrat Bennie Thompson, who was re-elected with 62.0% of the vote in 2024.

=== Democratic primary ===
==== Nominee ====
- Bennie Thompson, incumbent U.S. representative

==== Eliminated in primary ====
- Evan Turnage, antitrust lawyer
- Pertis Herman Williams III, logistics professional

==== Endorsements ====
Bennie Thompson

Local officials

- John Horhn, mayor of Jackson (2025–present) and former state senator from the 26th district (1993–2025)

Labor unions

- American Federation of Government Employees

Organizations

- Planned Parenthood Action Fund

==== Fundraising ====
Campaign finance reports as of February 18, 2026
Candidate	Raised	Spent	Cash on hand
Bennie Thompson (D)	$497,949	$579,555	$1,544,559
Evan Turnage (D)	$204,403	$164,697	$39,705
Source: Federal Election Commission

==== Results ====
Results by county Thompson: 70–80%; 80–90%; 90–100%

Democratic primary results
Party	Candidate	Votes	%
Democratic	Bennie Thompson (incumbent)	64,334	86.4
Democratic	Evan Turnage	9,249	12.4
Democratic	Pertis Herman Williams III	917	1.2
Total votes		74,500	100.0

=== Republican primary ===
==== Nominee ====
- Ron Eller, physician assistant and nominee for this district in 2024

==== Eliminated in primary ====
- Kevin Wilson, president of the Adams County Board of Supervisors

==== Fundraising ====
Campaign finance reports as of February 18, 2026
Candidate	Raised	Spent	Cash on hand
Ron Eller (R)	$21,612	$21,318	$37,023
Kevin Wilson (R) (Note: As last reported on December 31, 2025)	$55,676	$39,678	$15,997
Source: Federal Election Commission

==== Results ====
Results by county Eller: 50–60%; 60–70%; 70–80%; Wilson: 50–60%; 60–70%; 70–80%; 80–90%; 90–100%; Tie: 50%

Republican primary results
Party	Candidate	Votes	%
Republican	Ron Eller	12,881	51.1
Republican	Kevin Wilson	12,337	48.9
Total votes		25,218	100.0

=== Independents ===
==== Declared ====
- Bennie Foster, mentorship coach

=== General election ===
==== Predictions ====
Source	Ranking	As of
Decision Desk HQ	Safe D	July 14, 2026
The Cook Political Report	Solid D	March 13, 2025
Inside Elections	Solid D	March 7, 2025
Sabato's Crystal Ball	Safe D	July 15, 2025

==== Post-primary endorsements ====
Ron Eller (R)

Organizations

- Log Cabin Republicans
Bennie Thompson (D)

Labor unions

- United Auto Workers

Organizations

- Southern Poverty Law Center Action Fund

==== Fundraising ====
Campaign finance reports as of June 30, 2026
Candidate	Raised	Spent	Cash on hand
Bennie Thompson (D)	$770,970	$947,613	$1,449,521
Ron Eller (R)	$45,389	$46,245	$35,873
Source: Federal Election Commission

==== Results ====
2026 Mississippi's 2nd congressional district election
Party	Candidate	Votes	%	±%
Democratic	Bennie Thompson (incumbent)	169,048	67.89	+5.87
Republican	Ron Eller	73,941	29.70	–8.28
Libertarian	Johnny Baucom	6,004	2.41	N/A
Total votes		248,993	100	

== District 3 ==
2026 Mississippi's 3rd congressional district
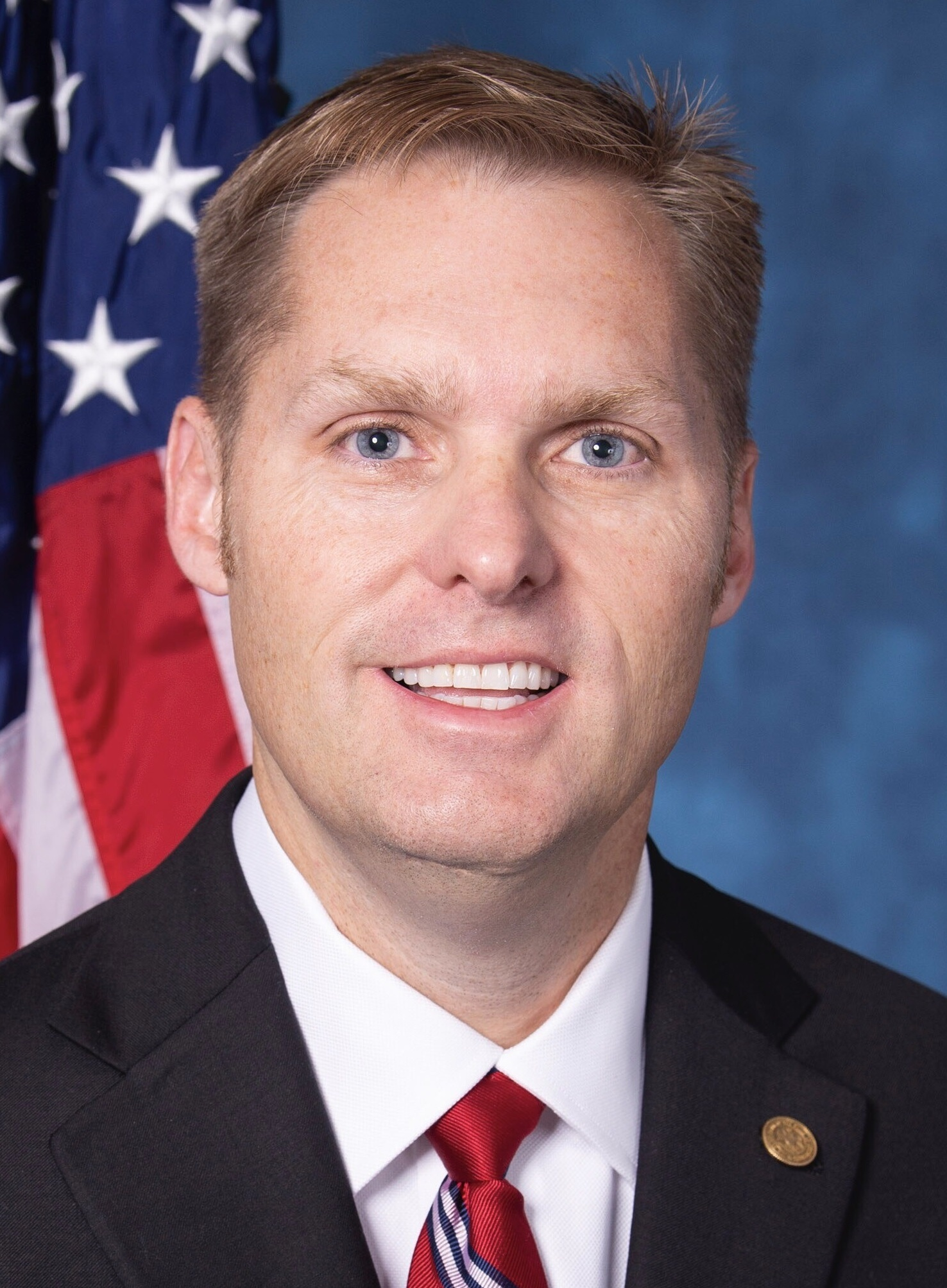

Nominee	Michael Guest	Michael Chiaradio
Party	Republican	Democratic
Popular vote	147,295	106,650
Percentage	57.3%	41.5%
- County results Guest: 50–60% 60–70% 70–80% Chiaradio: 50–60% 60–70% 70–80%
U.S. representative before election
Michael Guest
Republican
Elected U.S. representative
Michael Guest
Republican

The 3rd district is located in eastern and southwestern Mississippi, taking in Meridian, Starkville, Pearl, Brookhaven, and most of the wealthier portions of Jackson, including the portion of the city located in Rankin County. The incumbent is Republican Michael Guest, who was re-elected unopposed in 2024.

=== Republican primary ===
==== Nominee ====
- Michael Guest, incumbent U.S. representative

==== Endorsements ====
Michael Guest

Executive branch officials

- Donald Trump, president of the United States (2017–2021, 2025–present)

Organizations

- AIPAC

==== Fundraising ====
Campaign finance reports as of February 18, 2026
Candidate	Raised	Spent	Cash on hand
Michael Guest (R)	$624,846	$320,543	$815,649
Source: Federal Election Commission

==== Results ====
Republican primary results
Party	Candidate	Votes	%
Republican	Michael Guest (incumbent)	44,553	100.0
Total votes		44,553	100.0

=== Democratic primary ===
==== Nominee ====
- Michael Chiaradio, regenerative farmer

==== Fundraising ====
Campaign finance reports as of February 18, 2026
Candidate	Raised	Spent	Cash on hand
Michael Chiaradio (D)	$78,784	$68,463	$10,321
Source: Federal Election Commission

==== Results ====
Democratic primary results
Party	Candidate	Votes	%
Democratic	Michael Chiaradio	25,902	100.0
Total votes		25,902	100.0

=== Libertarian primary ===
==== Declared ====
- Erik Kiehle, property manager

=== General election ===
==== Predictions ====
Source	Ranking	As of
Decision Desk HQ	Safe R	July 14, 2026
The Cook Political Report	Solid R	March 13, 2025
Inside Elections	Solid R	March 7, 2025
Sabato's Crystal Ball	Safe R	July 15, 2025

==== Fundraising ====
Campaign finance reports as of June 30, 2026
Candidate	Raised	Spent	Cash on hand
Michael Guest (R)	$822,760	$371,591	$962,515
Michael Chiaradio (D)	$155,399	$132,190	$23,208
Erik Kiehle (L)	$0	$0	$0
Source: Federal Election Commission

==== Results ====
2026 Mississippi's 3rd congressional district election
Party	Candidate	Votes	%	±%
Republican	Michael Guest (incumbent)	147,295	57.3	+42.7
Democratic	Michael Chiaradio	106,650	41.5	N/A
Libertarian	Erik Kiehle	3,225	1.3	N/A
Total votes		257,170	100	

== District 4 ==
2026 Mississippi's 4th congressional district
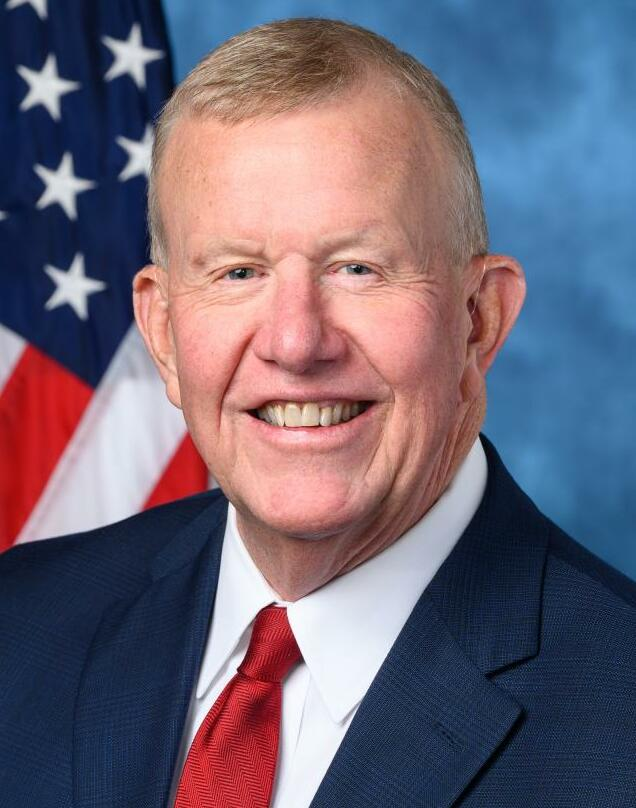

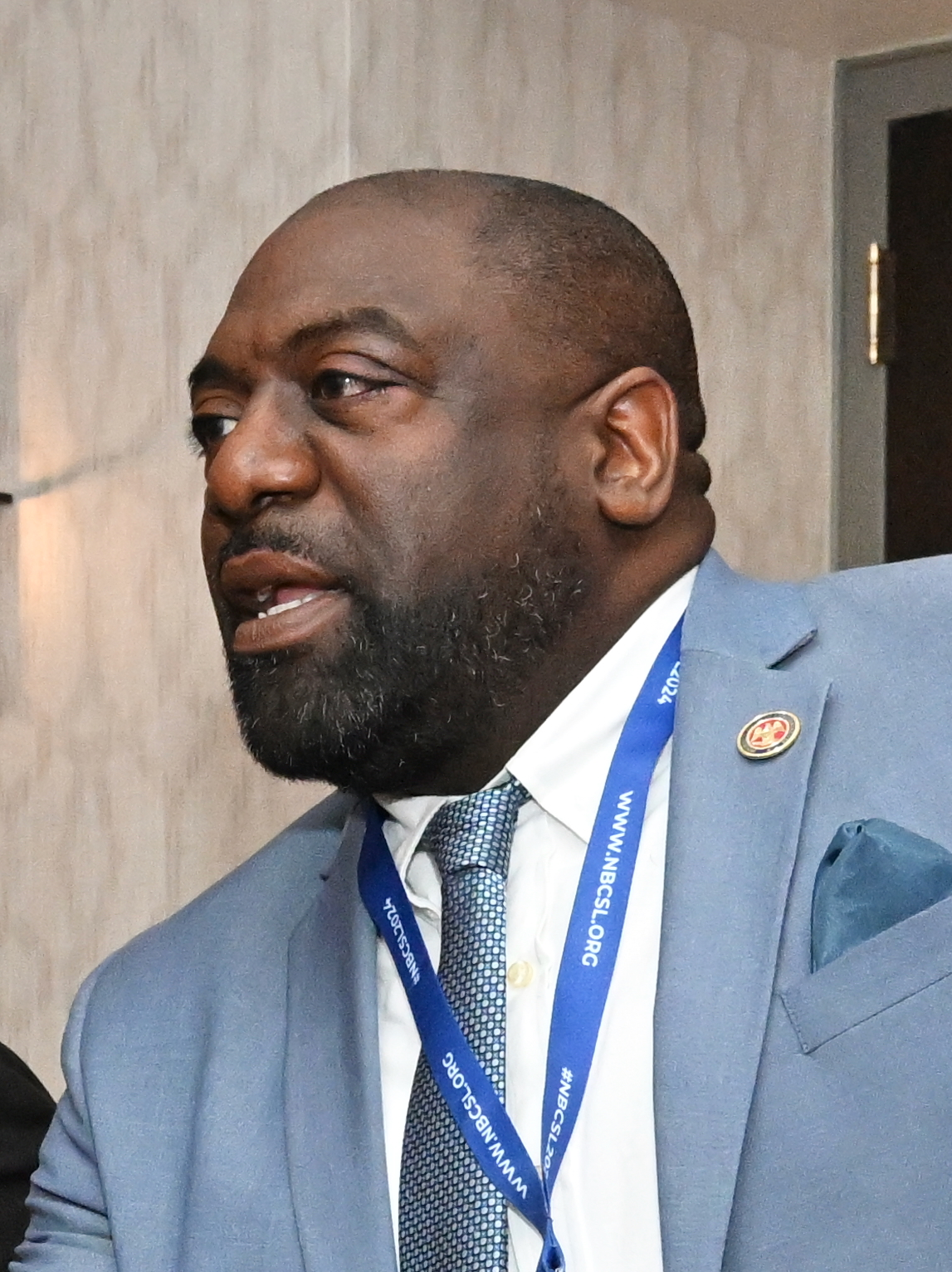
Nominee	Mike Ezell	Jeffrey Hulum III
Party	Republican	Democratic
Popular vote	133,614	79,367
Percentage	60.8%	36.1%
- County results Ezell: 50–60% 60–70% 70–80% 80–90% Hulum: 40–50%
U.S. Representative before election
Mike Ezell
Republican
Elected U.S. Representative
Mike Ezell
Republican

The 4th district encompasses the Mississippi Gulf Coast, including Gulfport, Biloxi, Hattiesburg, Bay St. Louis, Laurel, and Pascagoula. The incumbent is Republican Mike Ezell, who was elected with 73.9% of the vote in 2022.

=== Republican primary ===
==== Nominee ====
- Mike Ezell, incumbent U.S. representative

==== Eliminated in primary ====
- Sawyer Walters, former congressional staffer

==== Endorsements ====
Mike Ezell

Executive branch officials

- Donald Trump, 45th and 47th president of the United States (2017–2021, 2025–present)

Organizations

- AIPAC

==== Fundraising ====
Campaign finance reports as of February 18, 2026
Candidate	Raised	Spent	Cash on hand
Mike Ezell (R)	$711,271	$754,494	$108,241
Source: Federal Election Commission

==== Results ====
Results by county Ezell: 80–90%; 90–100%

Republican primary results
Party	Candidate	Votes	%
Republican	Mike Ezell (incumbent)	39,564	84.1
Republican	Sawyer Walters	7,484	15.9
Total votes		47,048	100.0

=== Democratic primary ===
==== Nominee ====
- Jeffrey Hulum III, state representative from the 119th district (2022–present)

==== Eliminated in primary ====
- Paul Blackman, U.S. Navy veteran
- Ryan Grover, marketing consultant, graphic designer, and nominee for lieutenant governor in 2023

==== Results ====
Results by county Hulum: 40–50%; 50–60%; 70–80%; Blackman: 30–40%; 40–50%; 50–60%

Democratic primary results
Party	Candidate	Votes	%
Democratic	Jeffrey Hulum III	11,046	57.7
Democratic	Paul Blackman	5,309	27.7
Democratic	Ryan Grover	2,799	14.6
Total votes		19,154	100.0

=== Third-party candidates ===
==== Declared ====
- Carl Boyanton, produce store owner and Republican candidate for this district in 2020, 2022 and 2024 (Independent)

=== General election ===
==== Predictions ====
Source	Ranking	As of
Decision Desk HQ	Safe R	July 14, 2026
The Cook Political Report	Solid R	March 13, 2025
Inside Elections	Solid R	March 7, 2025
Sabato's Crystal Ball	Safe R	July 15, 2025

==== Post-primary endorsements ====
Mike Ezell (R)

Organizations

- U.S. Chamber of Commerce

==== Fundraising ====
Campaign finance reports as of June 30, 2026
Candidate	Raised	Spent	Cash on hand
Mike Ezell (R)	$990,105	$1,018,211	$123,359
Jeffrey Hulum III (D)	$29,045	$22,863	$6,534
Carl Boyanton (I)	$43,526	$1,681	$41,844
Source: Federal Election Commission

==== Results ====
2026 Mississippi's 4th congressional district election
Party	Candidate	Votes	%	±%
Republican	Mike Ezell (incumbent)	133,614	60.8	–13.1
Democratic	Jeffrey Hulum III	79,367	36.1	+10.0
Independent	Carl Boyanton	6,726	3.1	N/A
Total votes		219,707	100	

== See also ==
- Elections in Mississippi
- Political party strength in Mississippi
- Mississippi Democratic Party
- Mississippi Republican Party
- Government of Mississippi
- 2026 United States Senate election in Mississippi
- 2026 United States House of Representatives elections
- 2026 United States elections

== Notes ==
Partisan clients
