= Isiah Fredericks =

American politician

Member of the Mississippi House of Representatives from the 119th district
- In office 1980–1990
- Succeeded by: Frances Fredericks

Personal details
- Born: November 6, 1930
- Died: April 30, 1990 (aged 59)
- Resting place: Biloxi National Cemetery
- Party: Democratic
- Spouse: Frances Fredericks
Military Service
- Branch: United States Air Force
- Rank: Senior Master Sergeant
- Conflicts: Korean War, Vietnam War

Isiah Fredericks (November 6, 1930 - April 30, 1990) was an American state legislator in Mississippi representing the 119th district in the Mississippi House of Representatives from 1980 until his death in 1990.

== Biography ==
Frederick was born on November 6, 1930. He was chief of the North Gulfport Fire Department.

Fredericks, a Democrat, was elected in 1979 to represent the 119th district in the Mississippi state House of Representatives, becoming the first Black person from South Mississippi to serve in the House.

== Death and legacy ==
Fredericks died on April 30, 1990, from cancer. He was laid to rest in the Biloxi National Cemetery in Biloxi, Mississippi.

Following his death, his wife, Frances Fredericks, ran for election to fill his vacant seat, winning with 59% of the vote. She was subsequently re-elected and served in the state house until retiring in 2012.

The Isiah Fredericks Community Center in Gulfport was named in his honor.

== See also ==
- Constitution of Mississippi
