= Congressional Gaming Caucus =

- Republican Co-Chair: Guy Reschenthaler (R-PA)
- Democratic Co-Chair: Dina Titus (D-NV)
- Political position: Bipartisan
- Colors: None Official (Gray Unofficial)
- Seats in the House: 32 / 435 (plus 1 non-voting)

The Congressional Gaming Caucus is a Congressional Member Organization within the United States House of Representatives, as approved by the Committee on House Administration.

== History of the Caucus ==
The Congressional Gaming Caucus was originally formed in the 20th century, as a means for Gambling and Casino Companies to have their voices heard on Congressional Issues. However, since many states at the time had imposed a ban on gambling, the Congressional Caucus went under the name of the Congressional Gaming Caucus. The Caucus was dissolved in the latter half of the 20th century, but continued to exist informally until it was officially reestablished in 2013 by Rep. Joe Heck (R-NV) and Bennie Thompson (D-MS). The Caucus was relaunched again in 2020 by Rep. Guy Reschenthaler (R) (PA-14) and Rep. Bennie Thompson (D) (MS-2), and is currently chaired by Reschenthaler and Rep. Dina Titus (D) (NV-01).

== Information and purpose ==
According to founding member and Co-Chair Joe Heck (R-NV), the purpose of the Congressional Gaming Caucus is to:

- Address employment and economic issues pertaining to the gaming industry, as well as working with the gaming industry to find solutions.
- To promote training and skills improvement which can make jobs available to constituents and economically empower gaming communities;
- Interacting with gaming companies and their representatives to hear their concerns and to share Member's concerns
- Holding Member and staff level meetings on a regular basis to assure the effectiveness, viability, and relevance of the Caucus.

== Membership ==
As of April 2, 2026, the Congressional Gaming Caucus has 28 members.

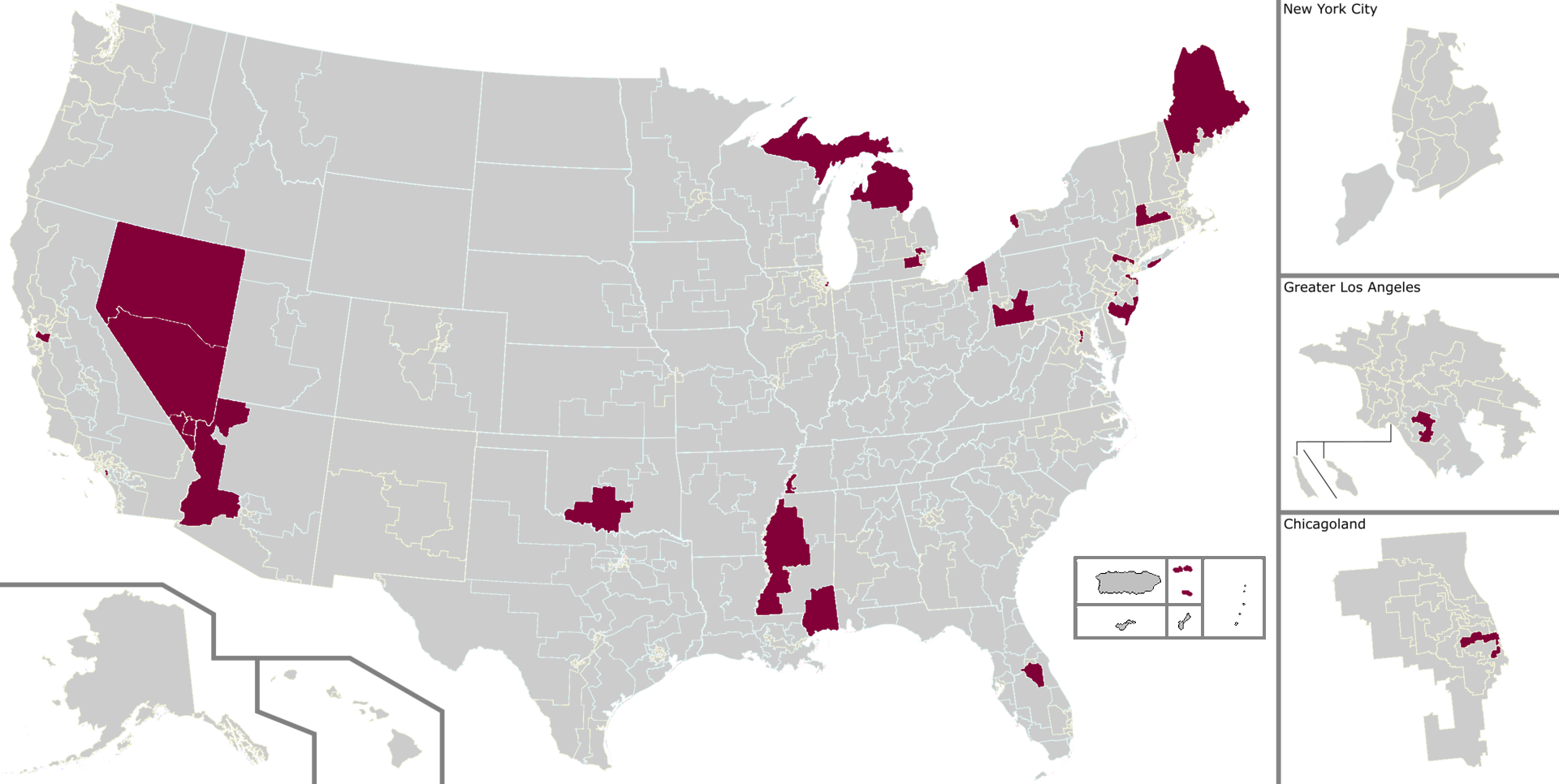
A district map of the Congressional Gaming Caucus as of April 2, 2026.

=== Current members ===
- Rep. Paul Gosar (R‑AZ‑9)
- Rep. Eric Swalwell (D‑CA‑14)
- Rep. Lou Correa (D‑CA‑46)
- Rep. Darren Soto (D‑FL‑9)
- Rep. Danny Davis (D‑IL‑7)
- Rep. Richard Neal (D‑MA‑1)
- Rep. Glenn Ivey (D‑MD‑4)
- Rep. Jared Golden (D‑ME‑2)
- Rep. Jack Bergman (R‑MI‑1)
- Rep. Debbie Dingell (D‑MI‑6)
- Rep. Haley Stevens (D‑MI‑11)
- Rep. Bennie Thompson (D‑MS‑2)
- Rep. Mike Ezell (R‑MS‑4)
- Rep. Jeff Van Drew (R‑NJ‑2)
- Rep. Josh Gottheimer (D‑NJ‑5)
- Rep. Frank Pallone (D‑NJ‑6)
- Co-Chair Rep. Dina Titus (D‑NV‑1)
- Rep. Mark Amodei (D‑NV‑2)
- Rep. Susie Lee (D‑NV‑3)
- Rep. Steven Horsford (D‑NV‑4)
- Rep. Andrew Garbarino (R‑NY‑2)
- Rep. Tim Kennedy (D‑NY‑26)
- Rep. David Joyce (R‑OH‑14)
- Rep. Tom Cole (R‑OK‑4)
- Rep. Brendan Boyle (D‑PA‑2)
- Co-Chair Rep. Guy Reschenthaler (R‑PA‑4)
- Rep. Steve Cohen (D‑TN‑9)
- Delegate Stacey Plaskett (D‑VI‑AL)

=== Former members ===
- Fmr. Rep. Michael Grimm (NY-15)-Was sentenced to prison.
- Fmr. Rep. Aaron Schock (IL-18)- Resigned due to an investigation around corruption charges.
- Fmr. Rep. Shelley Berkley (NV-1)- Unsuccessfully ran for Senate in 2012 instead of defending her seat.
- Fmr. Rep. Steven Horsford (D‑NV‑4)- Lost his 2014 reelection bid.
- Fmr. Rep. Jon Runyan Sr. (R‑NJ‑3)- Chose not to seek reelection in 2014.
- Fmr. Rep. Ann Kirkpatrick (AZ-1)- Unsuccessfully ran for Senate in 2016 instead of defending her seat.
- Fmr. Rep. Joe Heck (R‑NV‑3)- Unsuccessfully ran for Senate in 2016 instead of defending his seat.
- Fmr. Rep. Pat Tiberi (R‑OH‑12)- Resigned to lead the Ohio Business Roundtable in 2018.
- Fmr. Rep. Eliot Engel (D‑NY‑16)- Lost Democratic primary to Fmr. Rep. Jamaal Bowman in 2020.
- Fmr. Rep. Steve Stivers (R‑OH‑15)- Resigned to become president and CEO of the Ohio Chamber of Commerce in 2021.
- Fmr. Rep. Alcee Hastings (D‑FL‑20)- Died in office in 2021.
- Fmr. Rep. Marcia Fudge (D‑OH‑11)- Left congress to serve as United States Secretary of Housing and Urban Development in 2021.
- Fmr. Rep. Steven Palazzo (R‑MS‑4)- Lost Republican primary in 2022.
- Fmr. Rep. Adam Kinzinger (R‑IL‑16)- Chose not to seek reelection in 2022, became senior political commentator at CNN.
- Maryland Attorney General Anthony Brown (D‑MD‑4)- Ran instead for Attorney General of Maryland in 2022.
- Secretary Markwayne Mullin (R‑OK‑2)- Ran in a special election and become senator of Oklahoma in 2022.
- Fmr. Rep. Tom O'Halleran(D‑AZ‑1)- Appointed senior advisor to United States Department of Agriculture to the Biden administration in 2023.
- Fmr. Rep. Barbara Lee (D‑CA‑12)- Unsuccessfully ran for Senate in 2024 instead of defending her seat.
- Gov. Kelly Armstrong (D‑ND‑AL)- Did not seek reelection, became governor of North Dakota in 2024.
- Sen. Ruben Gallego (D‑AZ‑2)- Did not seek reelection, became senator of Arizona in 2024.
- Fmr. Rep. Doug LaMalfa (D‑CA‑1)- Died in office in 2026.

== Controversy ==
In recent years, the Caucus has received scrutiny from members of the press and public for its connections to the Gambling and Casino industry. Some examples include:

- In 2007, it was reported that Former Co-Chair of the Congressional Gaming Caucus, Rep. Shelley Berkley (NV-1), received over $161,000 for her 2006 reelection campaign from various gambling and Casino Special Interest Groups.
- In 2015, the Caucus lobbied the IRS to cancel its plans to lower the tax-reporting threshold for gambling earnings, a ruling intended to prevent tax fraud, despite the IRS receiving over 10,000 signatures requesting the measure to be enacted. In the letter to the Internal Revenue Service, the Caucus stated: "We strongly believe the IRS should not consider any reduction of this reporting threshold, as any lowering from $1,200 would have significantly negative impacts on casino operations and customers. Any reduction in this threshold would dramatically raise costs to comply, decrease gaming revenue due to more frequent slot machine 'lock-ups,' and would greatly increase the burden workload for IRS."
- From 2007 to 2017, Representative Bennie Thompson (MS-2) has received $97,672 from MGM Corporations, and $69,525 from Caesars Entertainment.
- From 2007 to 2017, Representative Dina Titus has received $130,050 from MGM Resorts International, and $38,850 from Caesars Entertainment.
- From 2007 to 2014, Representative Steven Horsford has received $95,150 from MGM Resorts International, and $24,000 from Boyd Gaming in campaign contributions.
