= Ira C. Welborn =

United States Army Medal of Honor recipient

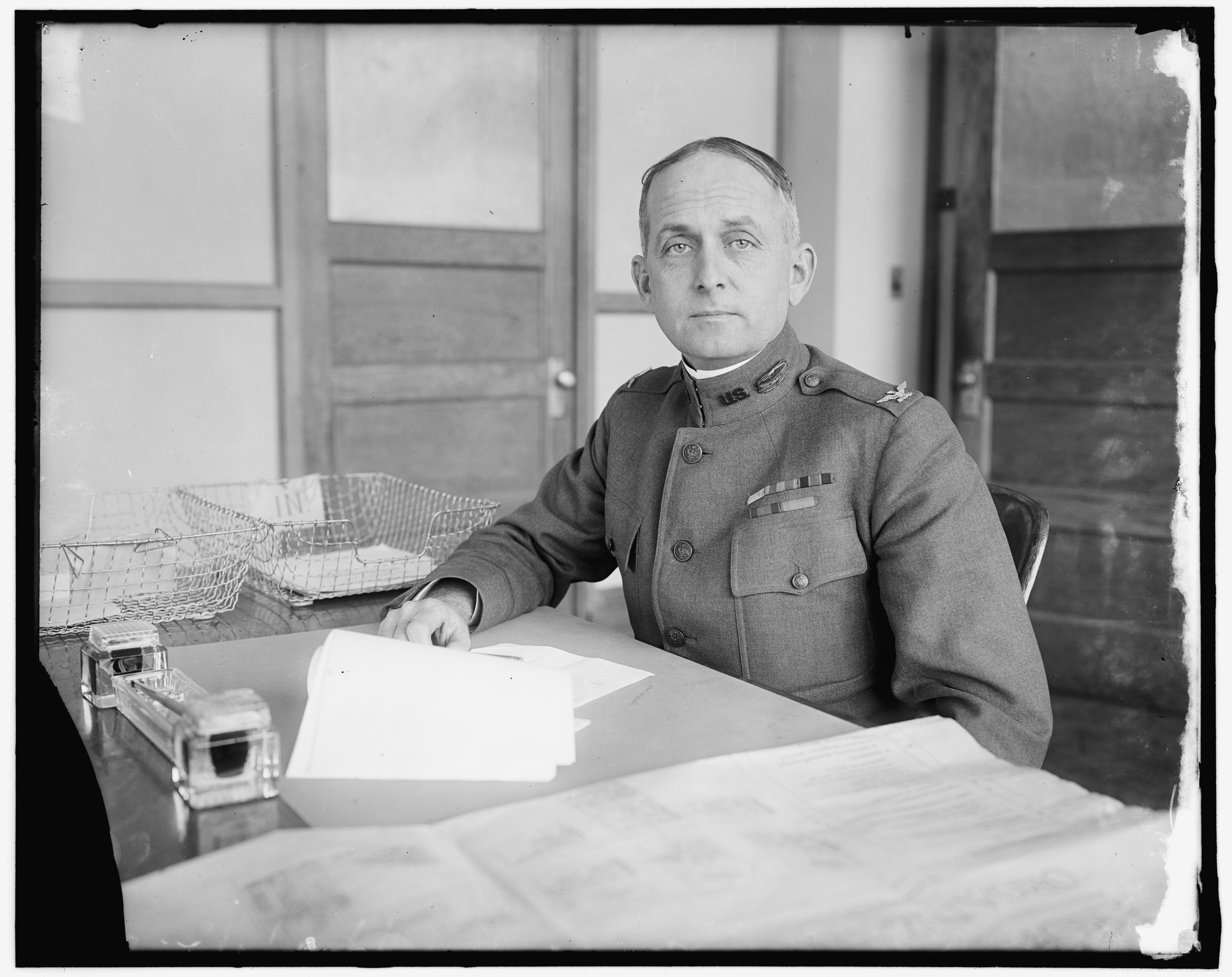
- Official portrait, c. 1918
- Born: Ira Clinton Welborn; February 13, 1874; Mico, Mississippi, U.S.
- Died: July 13, 1956 (aged 82); Gulfport, Mississippi, U.S.
- Burial place: Biloxi National Cemetery
- Military career
- Branch: United States Army
- Service years: 1898–1932
- Rank: Colonel
- Unit: Tank Corps
- Wars: Spanish–American War; Philippine–American War; Boxer Rebellion; World War I
- Awards: Medal of Honor; Distinguished Service Medal

Ira Clinton Welborn (February 13, 1874 – July 13, 1956) was a United States Army officer and recipient of the Medal of Honor for valor in action on July 2, 1898, at Santiago, Cuba.

== Early life and career ==
Welborn was born in Mico, Mississippi; graduating from the United States Military Academy at West Point as a member of the class of 1898. Just a few weeks after his graduation from the academy he was assigned as a 2nd lieutenant to the 9th Infantry Regiment, to serve in the Spanish–American War. He was awarded the Medal of Honor for his actions at the Battle of San Juan Hill, near Santiago, Cuba, on July 2, 1898, which he received on June 21, 1899.

== Later career ==
Welborn served in three other conflicts: the Philippine–American War, the Boxer Rebellion, and World War I, eventually rising to the rank of colonel. He served as a Tactical Officer at West Point, 1904–1906. After the tank was introduced to the battlefield in World War I, Welborn was detailed to be the first head of the fledgling United States Army Tank Service, for which he received the Distinguished Service Medal. He retired from service in 1932. He died in Gulfport, Mississippi, on July 13, 1956.

== Personal life ==
Wellborn was a member of the Society of the Army of Santiago de Cuba and the Military Order of the Dragon. His son, John C. Welborn, also attended West Point, rose to the rank of colonel, and commanded the 33rd Armored Regiment during World War II.

== Medal of Honor citation ==
Rank and organization: Second Lieutenant, 9th U.S. Infantry. Place and date: At Santiago, Cuba, 2 July 1898. Entered service at: Mico, Miss. Birth: Mico, Miss. Date of issue: 21 June 1899.

Citation:

Citation: Voluntarily left shelter and went, under fire, to the aid of a private of his company who was wounded.

== Bibliography ==
- Venzon, Anne Cipriano (2013). The United States in the First World War: an Encyclopedia. Hoboken, NJ: Taylor and Francis. ISBN 978-1-135-68453-2. OCLC 865332376.
