= Sonya Williams-Barnes =

American politician

Member of the Mississippi House of Representatives from the 119th district
- In office January 3, 2012 – May 8, 2022
- Preceded by: Frances Fredericks
- Succeeded by: Jeffrey Hulum III

Personal details
- Born: April 18, 1969 (age 57) Gulfport, Mississippi, U.S.
- Party: Democratic
- Education: Jackson State University

Sonya Williams-Barnes (born April 18, 1969) is an American politician who was most recently a member of the Mississippi House of Representatives representing the 119th district from 2012 to 2022.

Williams-Barnes currently works with the Southern Poverty Law Center.
