= Aviation Security Stakeholder Participation Act of 2013 =

- Long title: To amend title 49, United States Code, to direct the Assistant Secretary of Homeland Security (Transportation Security Administration) to establish an Aviation Security Advisory Committee, and for other purposes.
- Announced in: the 113th United States Congress
- Sponsored by: Rep. Bennie G. Thompson (D, MS-2)
- Number of co-sponsors: 3

Codification
- Acts affected: Federal Advisory Committee Act
- U.S.C. sections affected: 49 U.S.C. § 44946, 49 U.S.C. § 44901, Title 5
- Agencies affected: Transportation Security Administration

Legislative history
- Introduced in the House as H.R. 1204 by Rep. Bennie G. Thompson (D, MS-2) on March 14, 2013; Committee consideration by United States House Committee on Homeland Security, United States House Homeland Security Subcommittee on Transportation Security; Passed the House on December 3, 2013 (Roll Call Vote 617: 411-3)

The Aviation Security Stakeholder Participation Act of 2013 (H.R. 1204) is a bill that would force the Transportation Security Administration to consult with a new Aviation Security Advisory Committee about security policies. The bill passed in the United States House of Representatives during the 113th United States Congress.

== Background ==
During the 112th United States Congress, similar legislation passed in the House by voice vote, but did not become law.

== Provisions of the bill ==
The Aviation Security Stakeholder Participation Act of 2013 would direct the Assistant Secretary of Homeland Security (Transportation Security Administration [TSA]) to establish in the TSA an Aviation Security Advisory Committee. The Committee would include air cargo, general aviation, airport perimeter security, and risk-based subcommittees. The TSA must consult with the Committee on “aviation security matters, including on the development and implementation of policies, programs, rulemaking, and security directives pertaining to aviation security, while adhering to sensitive security guidelines.”

== Congressional Budget Office report ==
This summary is based largely on the summary provided by the Congressional Budget Office, as ordered reported by the House Committee on Homeland Security on October 29, 2013. This is a public domain source.

H.R. 1204 would establish, within the Transportation Security Administration (TSA), an advisory committee to make recommendations on issues related to aviation security. The bill would specify details related to the organizational structure and reporting requirements of the proposed advisory committee.

Under current law, TSA already operates an advisory committee related to aviation security. According to the TSA, the agency currently spends less than $100,000 annually to operate the existing committee, which has a mission and organizational structure that is similar to that of the committee envisioned under H.R. 1204. As a result, the Congressional Budget Office (CBO) estimates that implementing H.R. 1204 would have no significant additional cost. H.R. 1204 would not affect direct spending or receipts; therefore, pay-as-you-go procedures do not apply.

H.R. 1204 contains no intergovernmental or private-sector mandates as defined in the Unfunded Mandates Reform Act and would not affect the budgets of state, local, or tribal governments.

== Procedural history ==
The Aviation Security Stakeholder Participation Act of 2013 was introduced into the United States House of Representatives on March 14, 2013 by Rep. Bennie G. Thompson (D, MS-2). It was referred to the United States House Committee on Homeland Security and the United States House Homeland Security Subcommittee on Transportation Security. It was reported (amended) alongside House Report 113-278. On November 27, 2013, House Majority Leader Eric Cantor announced the H.R. 1095 would be considered on the House floor on December 3, 2013. The House voted on December 3, 2013 in Roll Call Vote 617 to pass the bill 411-3.

== Debate and discussion ==
The Aeronautical Repair Station Association (ARSA) successfully lobbied Rep. Richard Hudson (chairman of the Transportation Security Subcommittee) to have the bill amended at the committee level to add "aeronautical repair stations" to the list of requirement members on the Aviation Security Advisory Committee. According to the organization, the aviation maintenance industry is frequently overlooked "despite employing 306,000 workers and having a $47 billion per year impact on the U.S. economy." The ARSA's interest in this bill is due to an ongoing TSA rulemaking on repair station security.

Adam Dick, writing for the Ron Paul Institute for Peace and Prosperity, criticized the bill as a bill that "appears to advance the kind of bureaucracy-building exercise you typically see in growing government agencies." He criticizes the proposed Committee for being charged only to develop improvements in aviation security at the TSA's direction and with members entirely appointed by the TSA, rather than there being an independent Committee pursuing issues such as "respect for individual rights" or "reducing the activities of the TSA."

The House Republican Conference argue that codifying the Aviation Security Advisory Committee into law would "ensure that stakeholders continue to have a voice in TSA policy decisions, without the TSA allowing the Committee’s charter to expire," something that has happened previously.

== See also ==
- List of bills in the 113th United States Congress
