= Jeffrey Hulum III =

American politician

Jeffrey Hulum
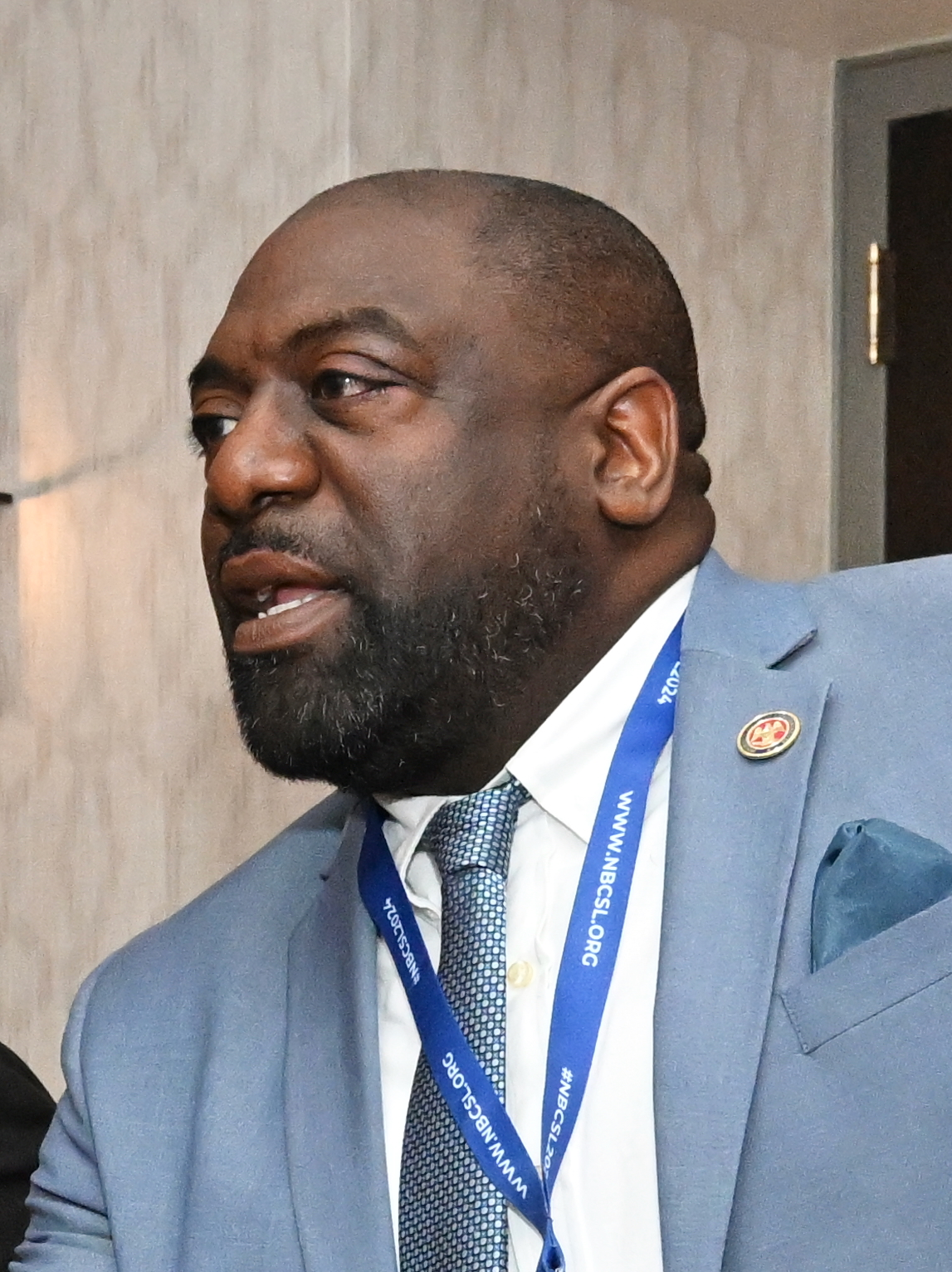
- Hulum in 2024

Member of the Mississippi House of Representatives from the 119th district
- Incumbent
- Assumed office August 5, 2022
- Preceded by: Sonya Williams-Barnes

Personal details
- Born: July 23, 1976 (age 50) Gulfport, Mississippi, U.S.
- Party: Democratic
- Education: Central Texas College (attended)

Jeffrey Hulum III (born July 23, 1976) is an American politician who is currently serving in the Mississippi House of Representatives from Mississippi's 119th House of Representatives district, a district based in the city of Gulfport in Harrison County. He was elected in a 2022 special election. He is a member of the Democratic Party. Hulum is the Democratic nominee for Mississippi's 4th congressional district in 2026.

== Biography ==
Hulum was born in Gulfport, Mississippi, on July 23, 1976. He graduated from Gulfport High School. He attended Central Texas College. He later joined the U.S. Army, serving for 22 years. Upon leaving the military, he founded several community organizations that focused on food drops.

== Mississippi legislature ==
In the 2019 Mississippi House of Representatives election, Hulum unsuccessfully challenged incumbent Democrat Sonya Williams-Barnes in Mississippi's 119th House of Representatives district, losing in the Democratic primary.

In May 2022, Williams-Barnes resigned from the district to join the Southern Poverty Law Center, triggering a special election. The election was held on July 19, 2022. Hulum won against fellow Democrat Gary Fredericks by a large margin.

As of 2025, he serves as Vice-Chair for Marine Resources, and sits on the Gaming; Military Affairs; Ports, Harbors and Airports; and Tourism committees.

== Personal life ==
He is of Baptist faith.

== Electoral history ==
2019 Mississippi's 119th House of Representatives district Democratic primary election
Party	Candidate	Votes	%
Democratic	Sonya Williams-Barnes (incumbent)	1,838	75.36%
Democratic	Jeffrey Hulum III	601	24.64%
Total votes		2,439	100%

2022 Mississippi's 119th House of Representatives district special election
Party	Candidate	Votes	%
Democratic	Jeffrey Hulum III	844	68.12%
Democratic	Gary Fredericks	395	31.88%
Total votes		1,239	100%
Democratic hold			
