= Frances Fredericks =

American politician (born 1935)

Member of the Mississippi House of Representatives from the 119th district
- In office 1990 – January 3, 2012
- Preceded by: Isiah Fredericks
- Succeeded by: Sonya Williams-Barnes

Personal details
- Born: September 23, 1935 (age 90) New Orleans, Louisiana
- Party: Democratic
- Spouse: Isiah Fredericks

Frances Fredericks (born September 23, 1935) is an American politician who served in the Mississippi House of Representatives from the 119th district from 1990 to 2012. She is a member of the Democratic Party.

== Biography ==
=== Early life, education, family ===
Frances Manning was born in New Orleans, Louisiana on September 23, 1935. She was the oldest of Percy and Alice Manning's eight children. She graduated from St. Mary's School of Nursing in Kansas City, Missouri. She worked at the Veterans Administration Hospital.

She married Isiah Fredericks, who became a Mississippi state representative. They had four children.

=== Political career ===
Upon the death of her husband, State Representative Isiah Frederick, in April 1990, Frances Fredericks ran for his seat representing the 119th district in a special election on June 5, 1990, winning with 59% of the vote against three other candidates. After redistricting, she again won the seat in 1992 with 81% of the vote. She stood unopposed in subsequent elections.

Fredericks served on the following committees in the House: Ways and Means, Judiciary B, Corrections, Public Health, Local and Private, Medicaid, the Select Committee on Poverty, and on the Marine Resources Committee.

She retired from the House in 2012.

=== Community involvement ===
Fredericks has held leadership and membership roles in multiple community organizations. She was president of the Harrison County Chapter of the National Council of Negro Women and is a life member of both that organization and the NAACP. She served as president of the American Federation of Government Employees from 1986 to 1990. Other affiliations have included the North Gulfport Civic Club, Harrison County Community Action Agency Board, Southern Mississippi Planning and Development District Board, Harrison/Hancock Foster Care Review Board, Harrison County Federation of Democratic Women, and Women in Government, where she was Mississippi State Director.
