= 2016 United States House of Representatives elections in Mississippi =

- November 8, 2016

All 4 Mississippi seats to the United States House of Representatives
	Majority party	Minority party
Party	Republican	Democratic
Last election	3	1
Seats won	3	1
Seat change	Steady	Steady
Popular vote	680,810	449,896
Percentage	57.58%	38.05%
Swing	▲5.02%	▲1.32%

Republican
40–50%
50–60%
60–70%
70–80%
80–90%
Democratic
40–50%
50–60%
60–70%
70–80%
80–90%

The 2016 United States House of Representatives elections in Mississippi were held on November 8, 2016, to elect the four U.S. representatives from the state of Mississippi, one from each of the state's four congressional districts. The elections coincided with the 2016 U.S. presidential election, as well as other elections to the House of Representatives, elections to the United States Senate and various state and local elections. The primaries were held on March 8.

== Overview ==
=== Statewide ===
2016 United States House of Representatives elections in Mississippi
Party	Votes	Percentage	Seats	+/–
Republican	680,810	57.58%	3	-
Democratic	449,896	38.05%	1	-
Libertarian	20,868	1.77%	0	-
Independents	15,614	1.32%	0	-
Reform	15,085	1.28%	0	-
Totals	1,182,273	100.00%	4	—

Popular vote
Republican	57.58%
Democratic	38.05%
Other	4.37%

House seats
Republican	75.0%
Democratic	25.0%

=== By district ===
Results of the 2016 United States House of Representatives elections in Mississippi by district:

District	Republican		Democratic		Others		Total		Result
District	Votes	%	Votes	%	Votes	%	Votes	%	Result
District 1	206,455	68.72%	83,947	27.94%	10,021	3.34%	300,423	100.0%	Republican hold
District 2	83,542	29.15%	192,343	67.11%	10,741	3.75%	286,626	100.0%	Democratic hold
District 3	209,490	66.20%	96,101	30.37%	10,854	3.43%	316,445	100.0%	Republican hold
District 4	181,323	65.04%	77,505	27.80%	19,951	7.16%	278,779	100.0%	Republican hold
Total	680,810	57.58%	449,896	38.05%	51,567	4.36%	1,182,273	100.0%	

== District 1 ==
2016 Mississippi's 1st congressional district election

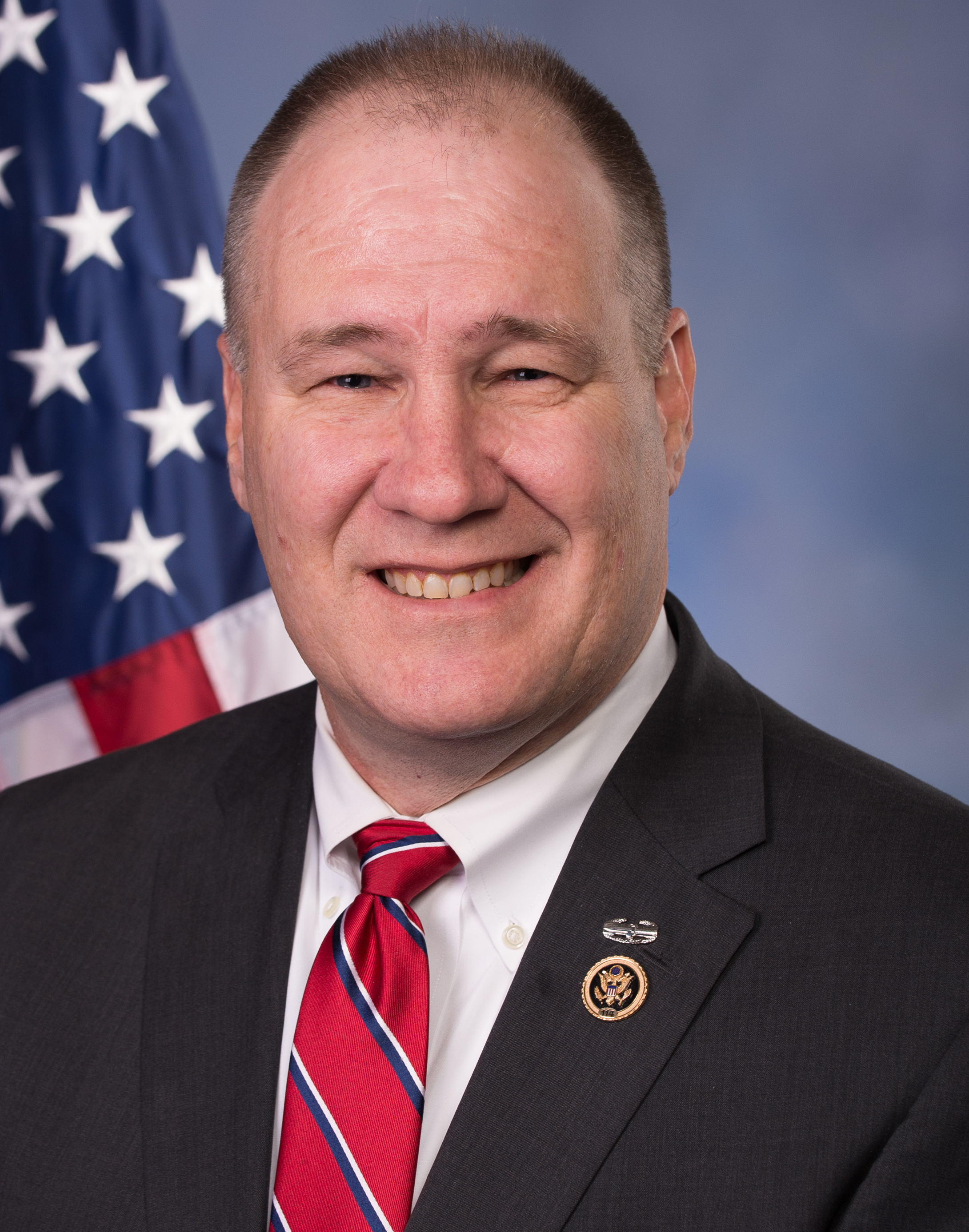

Nominee	Trent Kelly	Jacob Owens
Party	Republican	Democratic
Popular vote	206,455	83,947
Percentage	68.7%	27.9%
- County results Kelly: 40–50% 50–60% 60–70% 70–80% 80–90% Owens: 40–50%
U.S. Representative before election
Trent Kelly
Republican
Elected U.S. Representative
Trent Kelly
Republican

Incumbent Republican Trent Kelly, who had represented the district since 2015 ran for re-election. He won a special election to replace Alan Nunnelee (who died on February 6, 2015) with 70% of the vote in 2015 and the district had a PVI of R+16.

=== Republican primary ===
==== Candidates ====
===== Nominee =====
- Trent Kelly, incumbent U.S. Representative

===== Eliminated in primary =====
- Paul Clever

==== Results ====
Republican primary results
Party	Candidate	Votes	%
Republican	Trent Kelly (incumbent)	95,049	89.3
Republican	Paul Clever	11,397	10.7
Total votes		106,446	100.0

=== Democratic primary ===
==== Candidates ====
===== Nominee =====
- Jacob Owens

=== General election ===
==== Predictions ====
Source	Ranking	As of
The Cook Political Report	Safe R	November 7, 2016
Daily Kos Elections	Safe R	November 7, 2016
Rothenberg	Safe R	November 3, 2016
Sabato's Crystal Ball	Safe R	November 7, 2016
RCP	Safe R	October 31, 2016

==== Results ====
2016 Mississippi's 1st congressional district election
Party	Candidate	Votes	%
Republican	Trent Kelly (incumbent)	206,455	68.7
Democratic	Jacob Owens	83,947	27.9
Libertarian	Chase Wilson	6,181	2.1
Reform	Cathy Toole	3,840	1.3
Total votes		300,423	100.0
Republican hold			

==== By county ====
County	Trent Kelly Republican		Jacob Owens Democratic		Various candidates Other parties		Margin		Total
County	#	%	#	%	#	%	#	%	Total
Alcorn	11,262	80.25%	2,337	16.65%	434	3.09%	8,925	63.60%	14,033
Benton	2,168	57.66%	1,397	37.15%	195	5.19%	771	20.51%	3,760
Calhoun	4,616	73.42%	1,534	24.40%	137	2.18%	3,082	49.02%	6,287
Chickasaw	4,441	58.38%	2,950	38.78%	216	2.84%	1,491	19.60%	7,607
Choctaw	2,866	73.34%	930	23.80%	112	2.87%	1,936	49.54%	3,908
Clay	4,631	47.81%	4,777	49.31%	279	2.88%	-146	-1.51%	9,687
DeSoto	42,838	67.37%	17,972	28.26%	2,776	4.37%	24,866	39.11%	63,586
Itawamba	8,374	87.60%	903	9.45%	282	2.95%	7,471	78.16%	9,559
Lafayette	11,466	60.57%	6,676	35.27%	788	4.16%	4,790	25.30%	18,930
Lee	23,897	74.27%	7,562	23.50%	719	2.23%	16,335	50.76%	32,178
Lowndes	13,853	56.00%	10,037	40.58%	846	3.42%	3,816	15.43%	24,736
Marshall	6,697	48.43%	6,514	47.11%	617	4.46%	183	1.32%	13,828
Monroe	10,586	68.64%	4,465	28.95%	372	2.41%	6,121	39.69%	15,423
Oktibbeha (part)	950	59.12%	606	37.71%	51	3.17%	344	21.41%	1,607
Pontotoc	10,515	83.06%	1,790	14.14%	355	2.80%	8,725	68.92%	12,660
Prentiss	7,778	80.99%	1,633	17.00%	193	2.01%	6,145	63.98%	9,604
Tate	7,306	65.54%	3,404	30.53%	438	3.93%	3,902	35.00%	11,148
Tippah	6,973	78.34%	1,677	18.84%	251	2.82%	5,296	59.50%	8,901
Tishomingo	6,841	84.58%	960	11.87%	287	3.55%	5,881	72.71%	8,088
Union	9,295	82.89%	1,636	14.59%	283	2.52%	7,659	68.30%	11,214
Webster	3,995	80.54%	817	16.47%	148	2.98%	3,178	64.07%	4,960
Winston	5,107	58.57%	3,370	38.65%	242	2.78%	1,737	19.92%	8,719
Totals	206,455	68.72%	83,947	27.94%	10,021	3.34%	122,508	40.78%	300,423

== District 2 ==
2016 Mississippi's 2nd congressional district election

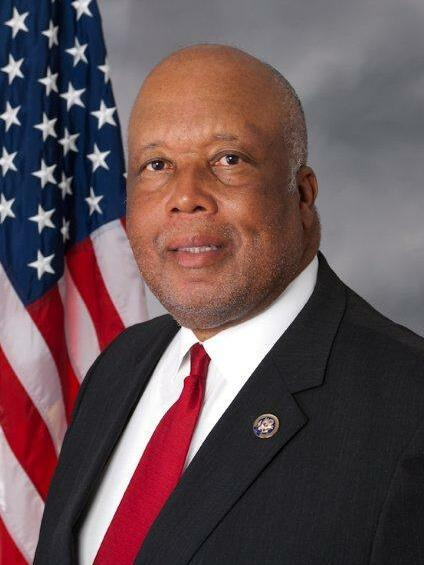

Nominee	Bennie Thompson	John Bouie II
Party	Democratic	Republican
Popular vote	192,343	83,542
Percentage	67.1%	29.1%
- County results Thompson: 40–50% 50–60% 60–70% 70–80% 80–90% Boule: 40–50% 50–60%
U.S. Representative before election
Bennie Thompson
Democratic
Elected U.S. Representative
Bennie Thompson
Democratic

Incumbent Democrat Bennie Thompson, who had represented the district since 1993, ran for re-election. He won re-election with 68% of the vote in 2014 and the district had a PVI of D+13.

=== Democratic primary ===
==== Candidates ====
===== Nominee =====
- Bennie Thompson, incumbent U.S. Representative

=== Republican primary ===
==== Candidates ====
===== Nominee =====
- John Bouie II

==== Results ====
Republican primary results
Party	Candidate	Votes	%
Republican	John Bouie II	35,871	100.0
Total votes		35,871	100.0

=== General election ===
==== Predictions ====
Source	Ranking	As of
The Cook Political Report	Safe D	November 7, 2016
Daily Kos Elections	Safe D	November 7, 2016
Rothenberg	Safe D	November 3, 2016
Sabato's Crystal Ball	Safe D	November 7, 2016
RCP	Safe D	October 31, 2016

==== Results ====
2016 Mississippi's 2nd congressional district election
Party	Candidate	Votes	%
Democratic	Bennie G. Thompson (incumbent)	192,343	67.1
Republican	John Bouie II	83,542	29.1
Independent	Troy Ray	6,918	2.4
Reform	Johnny McLeod	3,823	1.3
Total votes		286,626	100.0
Democratic hold			

==== By county ====
County	Bennie Thompson Democratic		John Bouie II Republican		Various candidates Other parties		Margin		Total
County	#	%	#	%	#	%	#	%	Total
Attala	3,642	45.24%	3,830	47.58%	578	7.18%	-188	-2.34%	8,050
Bolivar	9,492	70.34%	3,515	26.05%	488	3.62%	5,977	44.29%	13,495
Carroll	2,026	37.40%	2,949	54.44%	442	8.16%	-923	-17.04%	5,417
Claiborne	3,733	87.24%	455	10.63%	91	2.13%	3,278	76.61%	4,279
Coahoma	6,524	75.10%	1,882	21.66%	281	3.23%	4,642	53.44%	8,687
Copiah	7,279	57.18%	4,925	38.69%	526	4.13%	2,354	18.49%	12,730
Grenada	5,133	50.37%	4,614	45.28%	444	4.36%	519	5.09%	10,191
Hinds (part)	61,779	75.59%	17,773	21.75%	2,172	2.66%	44,006	53.85%	81,724
Holmes	6,725	84.20%	930	11.64%	332	4.16%	5,795	72.56%	7,987
Humphreys	2,900	76.46%	765	20.17%	128	3.37%	2,135	56.29%	3,793
Issaquena	421	62.09%	227	33.48%	30	4.42%	194	28.61%	678
Jefferson	3,346	87.52%	396	10.36%	81	2.12%	2,950	77.16%	3,823
Leake	4,041	49.24%	3,625	44.17%	540	6.58%	416	5.07%	8,206
Leflore	7,894	72.07%	2,688	24.54%	371	3.39%	5,206	47.53%	10,953
Madison (part)	9,415	80.32%	2,030	17.32%	277	2.36%	7,385	63.00%	11,722
Montgomery	2,426	49.99%	2,201	45.35%	226	4.66%	225	4.64%	4,853
Panola	7,974	54.55%	5,968	40.82%	677	4.63%	2,006	13.72%	14,619
Quitman	2,379	72.49%	770	23.46%	133	4.05%	1,609	49.02%	3,282
Sharkey	1,581	73.84%	500	23.35%	60	2.80%	1,081	50.49%	2,141
Sunflower	7,052	74.31%	2,084	21.96%	354	3.73%	4,968	52.35%	9,490
Tallahatchie	3,744	65.06%	1,732	30.10%	279	4.85%	2,012	34.96%	5,755
Tunica	2,611	75.77%	731	21.21%	104	3.02%	1,880	54.56%	3,446
Warren	9,780	51.34%	8,324	43.69%	947	4.97%	1,456	7.64%	19,051
Washington	11,781	71.34%	4,204	25.46%	529	3.20%	7,577	45.88%	16,514
Yalobusha	2,925	49.16%	2,791	46.91%	234	3.93%	134	2.25%	5,950
Yazoo	5,740	58.63%	3,633	37.11%	417	4.26%	2,107	21.52%	9,790
Totals	192,343	67.11%	83,542	29.15%	10,741	3.75%	108,801	37.96%	286,626

== District 3 ==
2016 Mississippi's 3rd congressional district election

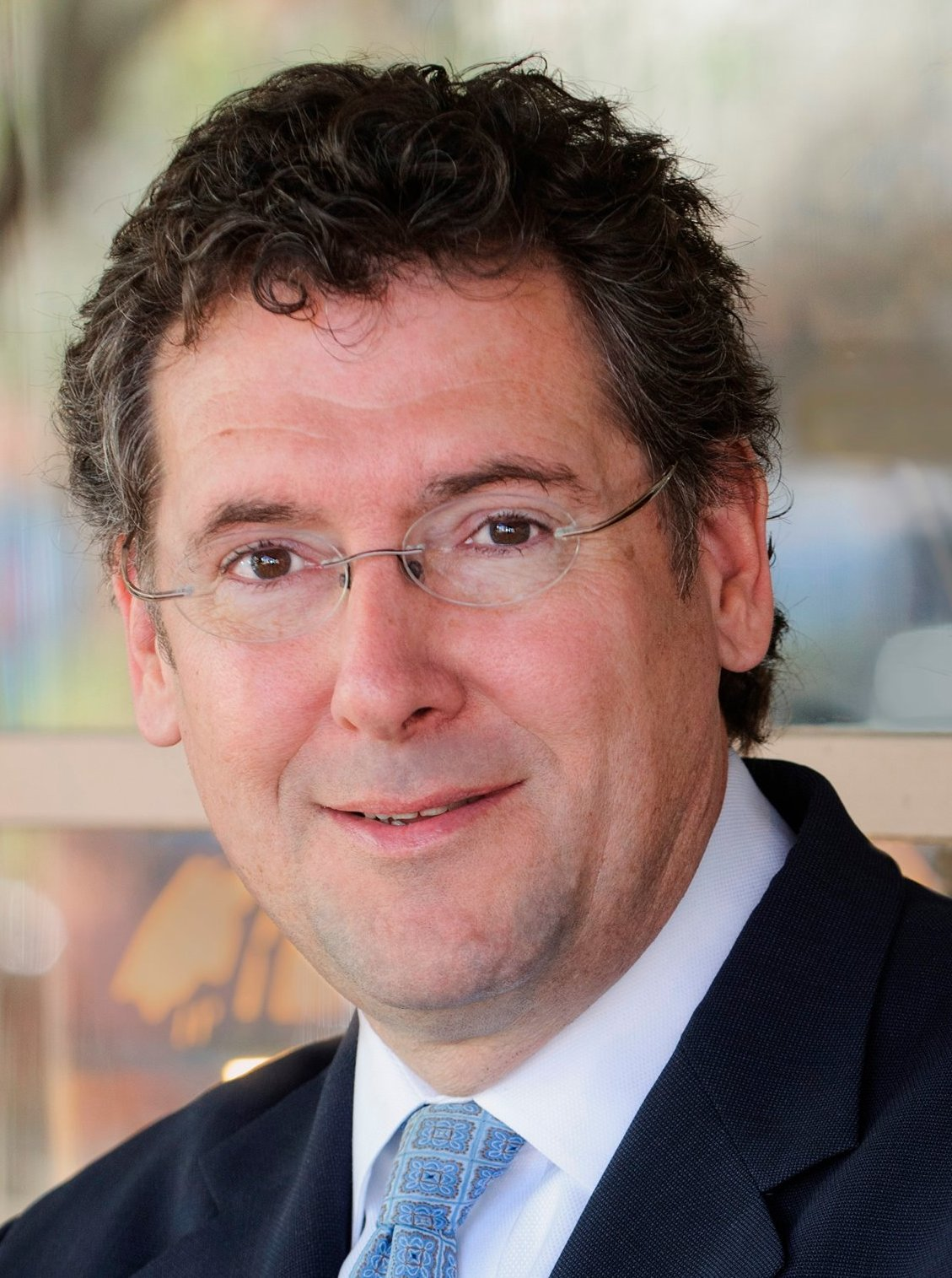

Nominee	Gregg Harper	Dennis Quinn
Party	Republican	Democratic
Popular vote	209,490	96,101
Percentage	66.2%	30.4%
- County results Harper: 40–50% 50–60% 60–70% 70–80% Quinn: 40–50% 50–60% 60–70%
U.S. Representative before election
Gregg Harper
Republican
Elected U.S. Representative
Gregg Harper
Republican

Incumbent Republican Gregg Harper, who had represented the district since 2009, ran for re-election. He won re-election with 69% of the vote in 2014 and the district had a PVI of R+14.

=== Republican primary ===
==== Candidates ====
===== Nominee =====
- Gregg Harper, incumbent U.S. Representative

===== Eliminated in primary =====
- Jimmy Giles

==== Results ====
Republican primary results
Party	Candidate	Votes	%
Republican	Gregg Harper (incumbent)	87,997	89.10
Republican	Jimmy Giles	10,760	10.9
Total votes		98,757	100.0

=== Democratic primary ===
==== Candidates ====
===== Nominee =====
- Dennis C. Quinn, candidate for this seat in 2014

===== Eliminated in primary =====
- Nathan Stewart

==== Results ====
Democratic primary results
Party	Candidate	Votes	%
Democratic	Dennis C. Quinn	29,149	65.5
Democratic	Nathan Stewart	15,384	34.5
Total votes		44,533	100.0

=== General election ===
==== Predictions ====
Source	Ranking	As of
The Cook Political Report	Safe R	November 7, 2016
Daily Kos Elections	Safe R	November 7, 2016
Rothenberg	Safe R	November 3, 2016
Sabato's Crystal Ball	Safe R	November 7, 2016
RCP	Safe R	October 31, 2016

==== Results ====
2016 Mississippi's 3rd congressional district election
Party	Candidate	Votes	%
Republican	Gregg Harper (incumbent)	209,490	66.2
Democratic	Dennis C. Quinn	96,101	30.4
Independent	Roger Gerrard	8,696	2.7
Reform	Lajena Sheets	2,158	0.7
Total votes		316,445	100.0
Republican hold			

==== By county ====
County	Gregg Harper Republican		Dennis C. Quinn Democratic		Various candidates Other parties		Margin		Total
County	#	%	#	%	#	%	#	%	Total
Adams	6,236	47.69%	6,366	48.68%	475	3.63%	-130	-0.99%	13,077
Amite	4,249	61.98%	2,352	34.31%	254	3.71%	1,897	27.67%	6,855
Clarke (part)	4,810	72.32%	1,649	24.79%	192	2.89%	3,161	47.53%	6,651
Covington	5,503	64.08%	2,740	31.90%	345	4.02%	2,763	32.17%	8,588
Franklin	2,744	66.41%	1,190	28.80%	198	4.79%	1,554	37.61%	4,132
Hinds (part)	7,478	58.21%	5,031	39.16%	337	2.62%	2,447	19.05%	12,846
Jasper	4,235	51.15%	3,782	45.68%	262	3.16%	453	5.47%	8,279
Jefferson Davis	2,802	46.37%	3,028	50.11%	213	3.52%	-226	-3.74%	6,043
Kemper	2,204	49.53%	2,113	47.48%	133	2.99%	91	2.04%	4,450
Lauderdale	19,196	66.86%	8,517	29.67%	997	3.47%	10,679	37.20%	28,710
Lawrence	4,212	67.40%	1,834	29.35%	203	3.25%	2,378	38.05%	6,249
Lincoln	10,762	71.50%	3,897	25.89%	393	2.61%	6,865	45.61%	15,052
Madison (part)	27,997	74.96%	8,272	22.15%	1,079	2.89%	19,725	52.81%	37,348
Neshoba	7,901	76.13%	2,149	20.71%	328	3.16%	5,752	55.42%	10,378
Newton	6,752	72.89%	2,199	23.74%	312	3.37%	4,553	49.15%	9,263
Noxubee	1,515	30.50%	3,292	66.28%	160	3.22%	-1,777	-35.78%	4,967
Oktibbeha (part)	8,794	54.44%	6,807	42.14%	553	3.42%	1,987	12.30%	16,154
Pike	8,311	51.89%	7,123	44.47%	582	3.63%	1,188	7.42%	16,016
Rankin	48,160	78.02%	11,015	17.84%	2,553	4.14%	37,145	60.18%	61,728
Scott	6,570	63.92%	3,420	33.27%	288	2.80%	3,150	30.65%	10,278
Simpson	7,575	67.69%	3,269	29.21%	347	3.10%	4,306	38.48%	11,191
Smith	5,836	77.75%	1,405	18.72%	265	3.53%	4,431	59.03%	7,506
Walthall	4,093	61.65%	2,317	34.90%	229	3.45%	1,776	26.75%	6,639
Wilkinson	1,555	38.44%	2,334	57.70%	156	3.86%	-779	-19.26%	4,045
Totals	209,490	66.20%	96,101	30.37%	10,854	3.43%	113,389	35.83%	316,445

== District 4 ==
2016 Mississippi's 4th congressional district election

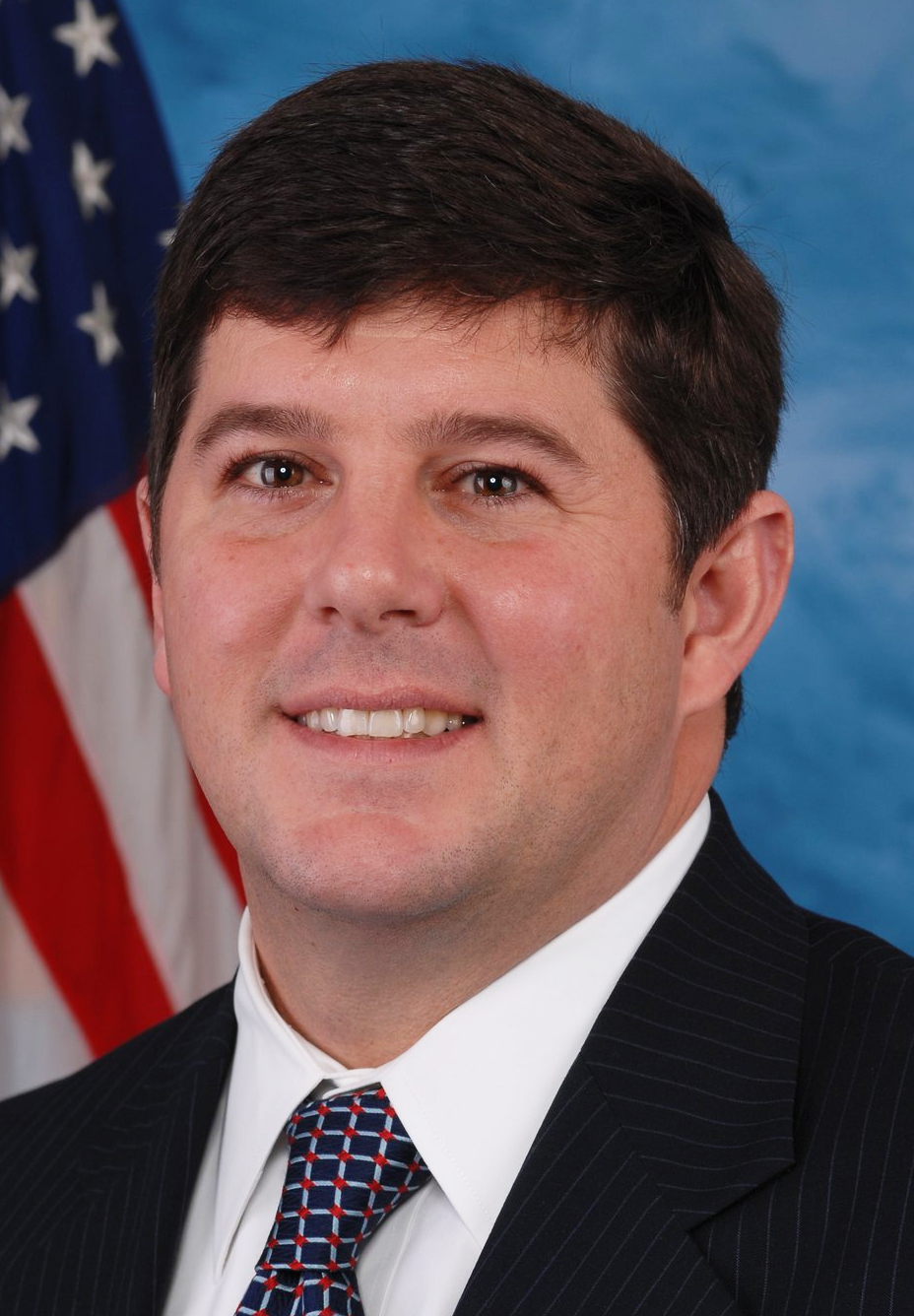

Nominee	Steven Palazzo	Mark Gladney	Richard McCluskey
Party	Republican	Democratic	Libertarian
Popular vote	181,323	77,505	14,687
Percentage	65.0%	27.8%	5.3%
- County results Palazzo: 50–60% 60–70% 70–80% 80–90% Gladney: 50–60%
U.S. Representative before election
Steven Palazzo
Republican
Elected U.S. Representative
Steven Palazzo
Republican

Incumbent Republican Steven Palazzo, who had represented the district since 2011, ran for re-election. He was re-elected with 70% of the vote in 2014 and the district had a PVI of R+21.

=== Republican primary ===
==== Candidates ====
===== Nominee =====
- Steven Palazzo, incumbent U.S. Representative

==== Results ====
Republican primary results
Party	Candidate	Votes	%
Republican	Steven Palazzo (incumbent)	103,558	100.0
Total votes		103,558	100.0

=== Democratic primary ===
==== Candidates ====
===== Nominee =====
- Mark Gladney, helicopter pilot

=== Libertarian primary ===
==== Candidates ====
===== Nominee =====
- Richard McCluskey

=== General election ===
==== Predictions ====
Source	Ranking	As of
The Cook Political Report	Safe R	November 7, 2016
Daily Kos Elections	Safe R	November 7, 2016
Rothenberg	Safe R	November 3, 2016
Sabato's Crystal Ball	Safe R	November 7, 2016
RCP	Safe R	October 31, 2016

==== Results ====
2016 Mississippi's 4th congressional district election
Party	Candidate	Votes	%
Republican	Steven Palazzo (incumbent)	181,323	65.0
Democratic	Mark Gladney	77,505	27.8
Libertarian	Richard Blake McCluskey	14,687	5.3
Reform	Shawn O'Hara	5,264	1.9
Total votes		278,779	100.0
Republican hold			

==== By county ====
County	Steven Palazzo Republican		Mark Gladney Democratic		Various candidates Other parties		Margin		Total
County	#	%	#	%	#	%	#	%	Total
Clarke (part)	458	45.80%	505	50.50%	37	3.70%	-47	-4.70%	1,000
Forrest	14,943	53.95%	10,402	37.56%	2,353	8.50%	4,541	16.39%	27,698
George	8,213	84.50%	996	10.25%	511	5.26%	7,217	74.25%	9,720
Greene	3,801	71.87%	829	15.67%	659	12.46%	2,972	56.19%	5,289
Hancock	11,932	69.39%	4,000	23.26%	1,264	7.35%	7,932	46.13%	17,196
Harrison	35,463	57.12%	21,796	35.11%	4,826	7.77%	13,667	22.01%	62,085
Jackson	30,831	63.25%	14,392	29.52%	3,523	7.23%	16,439	33.72%	48,746
Jones	19,108	68.19%	7,124	25.42%	1,791	6.39%	11,984	42.76%	28,023
Lamar	17,753	72.72%	4,910	20.11%	1,750	7.17%	12,843	52.61%	24,413
Marion	7,758	67.09%	3,326	28.76%	479	4.14%	4,432	38.33%	11,563
Pearl River	16,613	78.04%	3,426	16.09%	1,248	5.86%	13,187	61.95%	21,287
Perry	3,762	70.37%	1,102	20.61%	482	9.02%	2,660	49.76%	5,346
Stone	4,848	69.91%	1,559	22.48%	528	7.61%	3,289	47.43%	6,935
Wayne	5,840	61.62%	3,138	33.11%	500	5.28%	2,702	28.51%	9,478
Totals	181,323	65.04%	77,505	27.80%	19,951	7.16%	103,818	37.24%	278,779
