= Kelvin Buck =

American politician

Member of the Mississippi House of Representatives from the 5th district
- In office 2004–2013

Personal details
- Born: Kelvin Oneal Buck; July 23, 1961 (age 65) Tupelo, Mississippi, U.S.
- Party: Democratic
- Education: Rust College (BA); Jackson State University (MPPA)
- Profession: broadcasting executive
- Website: www.buckforcongress.com

Kelvin O. Buck (born July 23, 1961) is an American politician who served as a member of the Mississippi House of Representatives as a Democrat from 2004 to 2013. He was the mayor of Holly Springs from 2013 to 2021.

He was re-elected for a second term in 2017.

In September 2025, he filed to run for representative of Mississippi's 1st congressional district in the 2026 elections.
