= Biloxi National Cemetery =

Veterans cemetery in Harrison County, Mississippi

Coordinates: 30°24′38″N 88°56′40″W

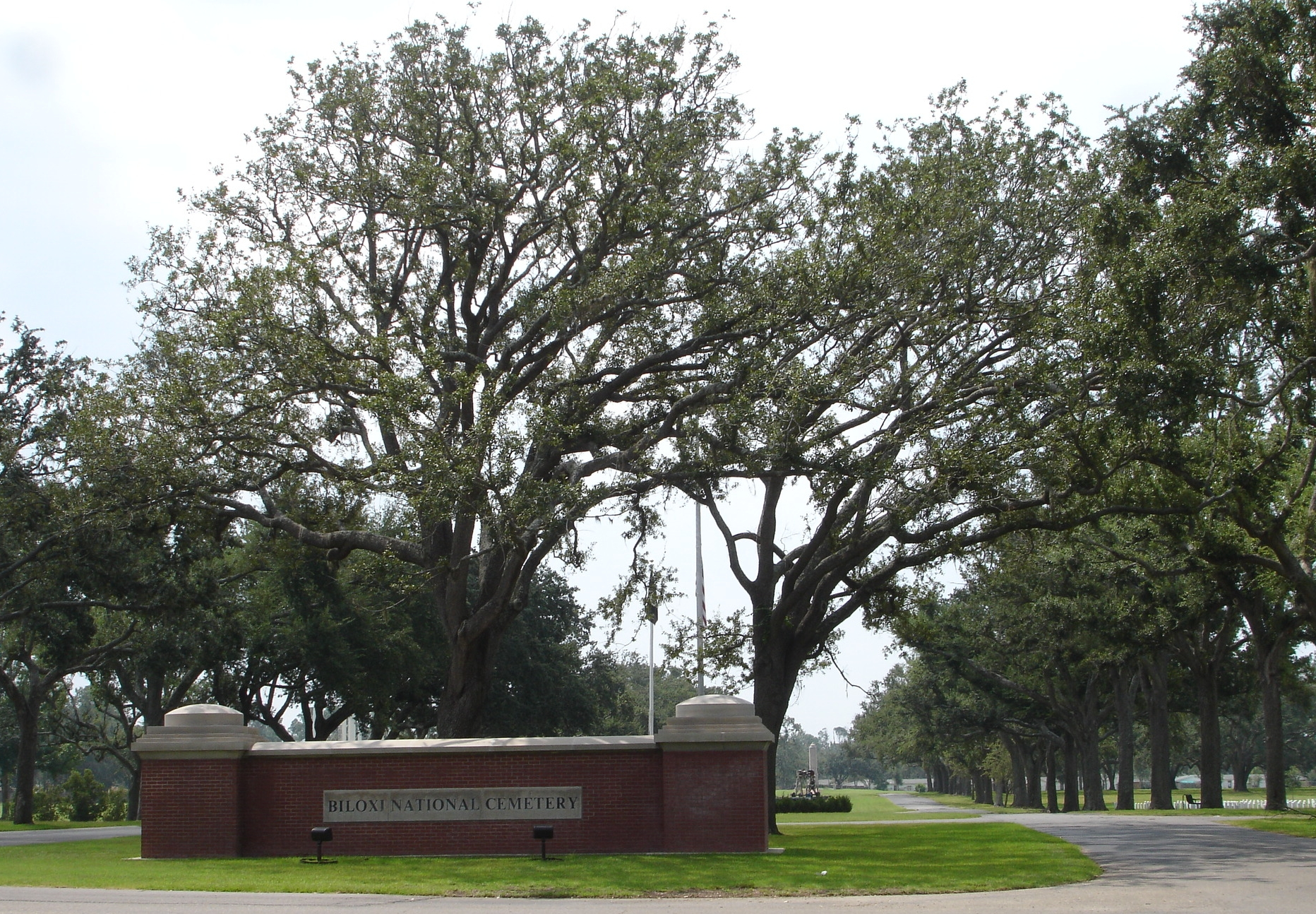
- Biloxi National Cemetery
- Interactive map of Biloxi National Cemetery

Details
- Established: 1934
- Location: Biloxi, Mississippi
- Country: United States
- Type: U.S. National Cemetery
- Size: 54 acres (22 ha)
- No. of interments: Over 27,000

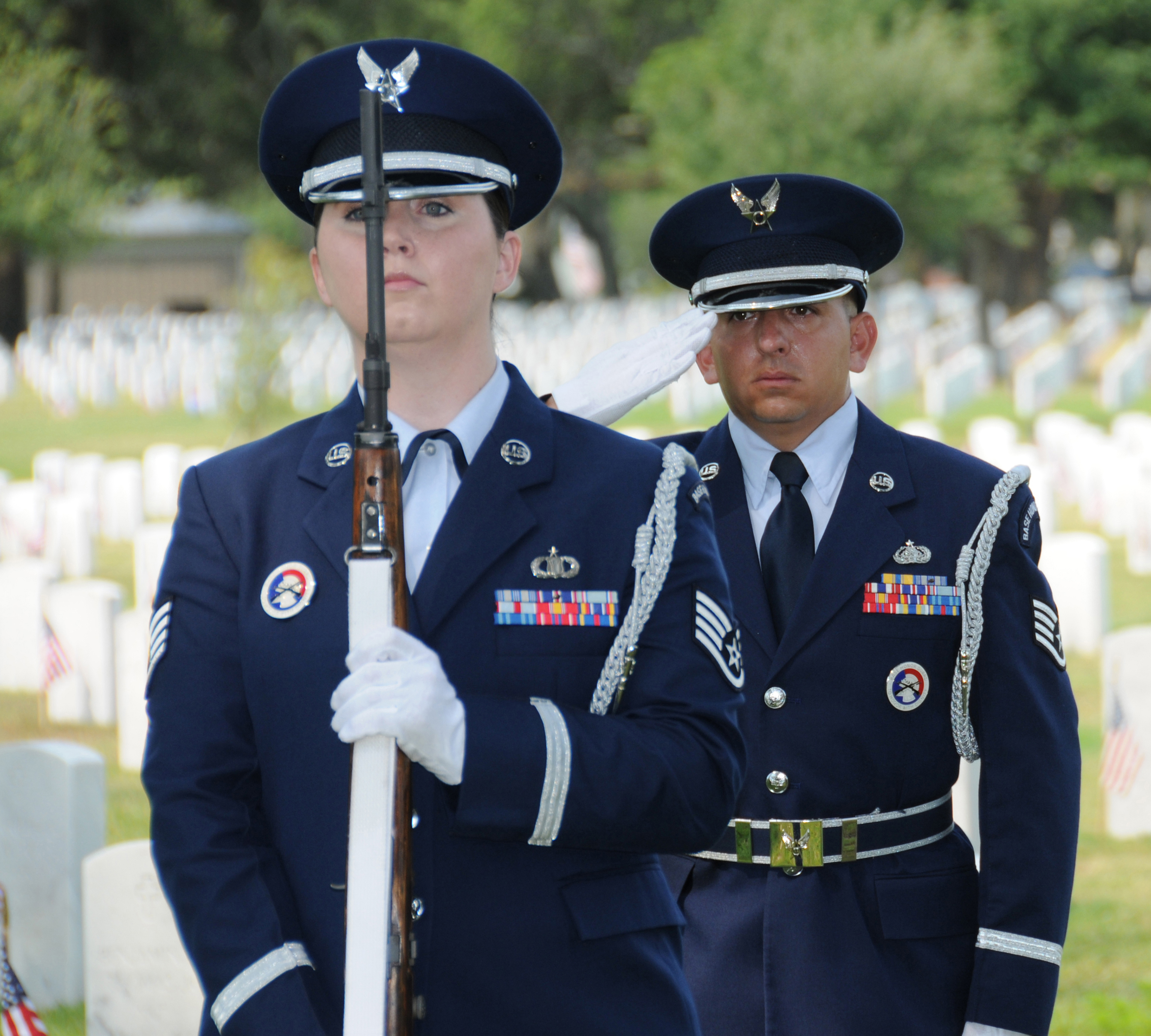
2011 Memorial Day ceremony at Biloxi National Cemetery

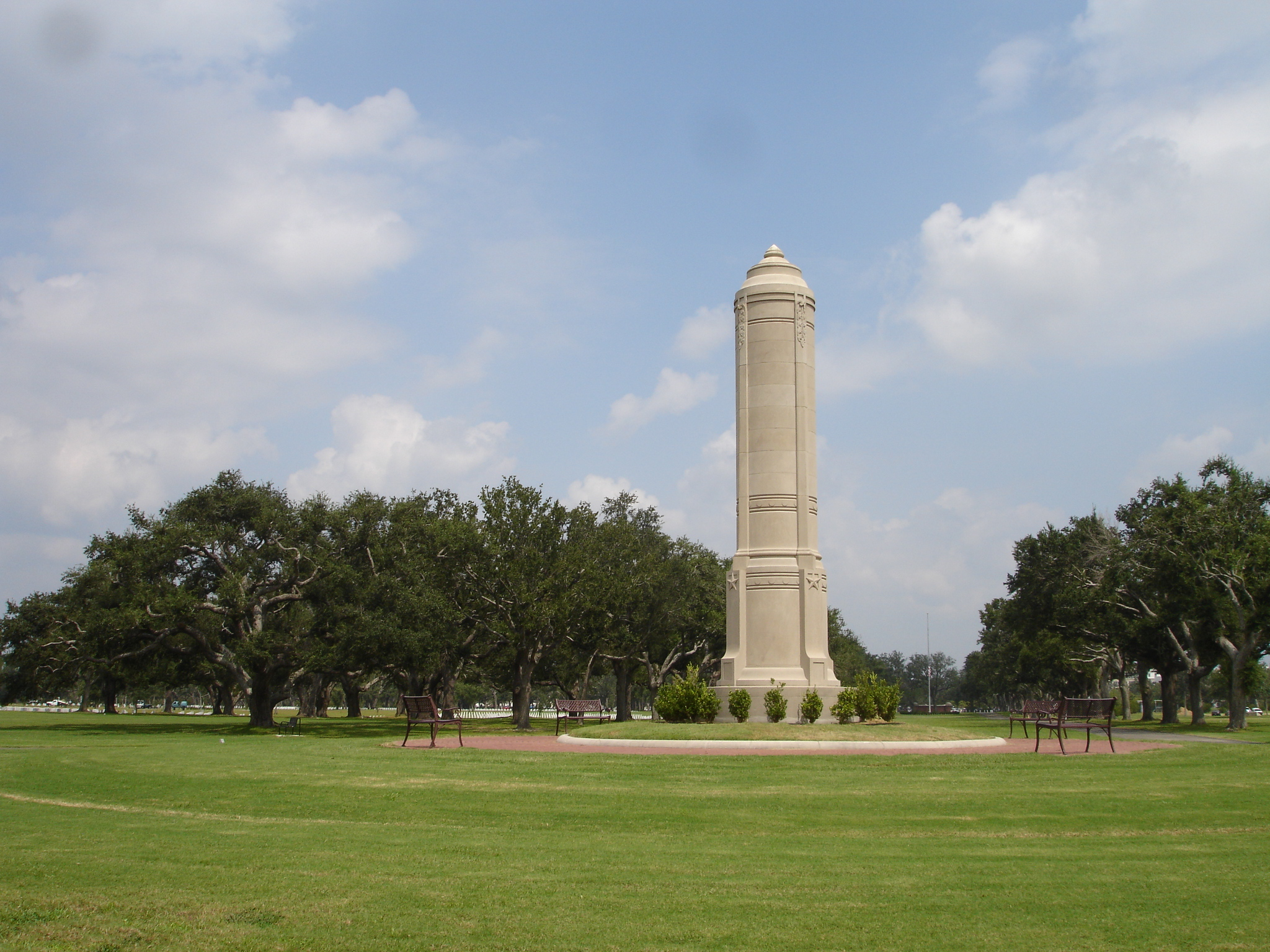
Veterans Monument

Biloxi National Cemetery is a U.S. National Cemetery that is located in Biloxi, Mississippi on the grounds of the Department of Veterans Affairs Medical Center (VAMC), near Keesler Air Force Base. It occupies approximately 54 acres (22 ha), and is site to over 27,000 interments as of 2021.

== History ==
Biloxi National Cemetery was established in 1934 and its first burial, of Edgar A. Ross of the Tennessee Infantry, was held on March 24, 1934.

From 1934 to 1973, the purpose of Biloxi National Cemetery was to provide a final resting place solely for veterans who died in the adjoining medical center. In 1973 with the passage of the National Cemetery Act, the burial ground was opened to all honorably discharged veterans, active duty personnel, and their dependents regardless of where they died. Since its establishment, the grounds have increased in size twice as the result of land transfers from the VAMC. Originally 25 acres (10 ha), in 1982, 17 acres (6.9 ha) were added and in 1996, 12 more were added for a total of 54 acres (22 ha).

== Notable markers ==
A granite marker located in front of the cemetery's administration building was donated by the National Association of Atomic Veterans on November 9, 1990, in memory of the veterans who participated in the U.S. nuclear weapons testing program.

== Notable burials ==
- Medal of Honor recipient
  - Colonel Ira C. Welborn (1874–1956), for actions in the Spanish–American War
- Others
  - Uncle Elmer (1937–1992), professional wrestler
  - June Gardner (1930–2010), R&B drummer and bandleader
  - Lamar Williams (1949–1983), popular music bassist
