= Bennie Thompson =

American politician and educator (born 1948)

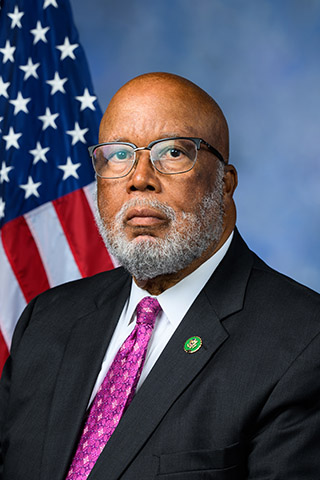
- Official portrait, 2023

Ranking Member of the House Homeland Security Committee
- Incumbent
- Assumed office January 3, 2023
- Preceded by: John Katko
- In office January 3, 2011 – January 3, 2019
- Preceded by: Peter King
- Succeeded by: Mike Rogers
- In office January 3, 2005 – January 3, 2007
- Preceded by: Jim Turner
- Succeeded by: Peter King

Chair of the House January 6th Committee
- In office July 1, 2021 – January 3, 2023
- Preceded by: Position established
- Succeeded by: Position abolished

Chair of the House Homeland Security Committee
- In office January 3, 2019 – January 3, 2023
- Preceded by: Michael McCaul
- Succeeded by: Mark Green
- In office January 3, 2007 – January 3, 2011
- Preceded by: Peter King
- Succeeded by: Peter King

Member of the U.S. House of Representatives from Mississippi's 2nd district
- Incumbent
- Assumed office April 13, 1993 (Note: Thompson's official service begins on the date of the special election, while he was not sworn in until April 20, 1993.)
- Preceded by: Mike Espy

Personal details
- Born: Bennie Gordon Thompson; January 28, 1948 (age 78) Bolton, Mississippi, U.S.
- Party: Democratic
- Spouse: London Johnson (m. 1968)
- Children: 1
- Education: Tougaloo College (BA); Jackson State University (MS)
- Website: House website Campaign website
- Thompson's voice Thompson supporting the HBCUs Homeland Security Partnerships Act. Recorded February 10, 2020

Bennie Gordon Thompson (born January 28, 1948) is an American politician and educator serving as the U.S. representative for Mississippi's 2nd congressional district since 1993. A member of the Democratic Party, Thompson served as the chair of the Committee on Homeland Security from 2007 to 2011 and from 2019 to 2023. He was both the first Democrat and the first African American to chair the committee. Since 2011, he has been the only Democrat in Mississippi's congressional delegation, and since 2018 he has been the dean of the delegation after Thad Cochran left Congress.

Thompson's district includes most of Jackson and is the only majority-black district in the state. It is about 275 miles (443 km) long, 180 miles (290 km) wide, and borders the Mississippi River. The Mississippi Delta comprises the vast majority of the district.

== Early life, education, and career ==
Thompson was born in Bolton, Mississippi, the son of Will Thompson and Annie (Lauris) Thompson. He attended Hinds County public schools and graduated from Hinds County Agricultural High School. He then attended Tougaloo College, from which he earned a Bachelor of Arts in political science in 1968. He earned a Master of Science in educational administration from Jackson State University in 1972.

Thompson was a schoolteacher in Madison, Mississippi. He served as an alderman (1969–1973) and then mayor of Bolton (1973–1980) before being elected to the Hinds County Board of Supervisors, on which he served from 1980 to 1993.

== U.S. House of Representatives ==
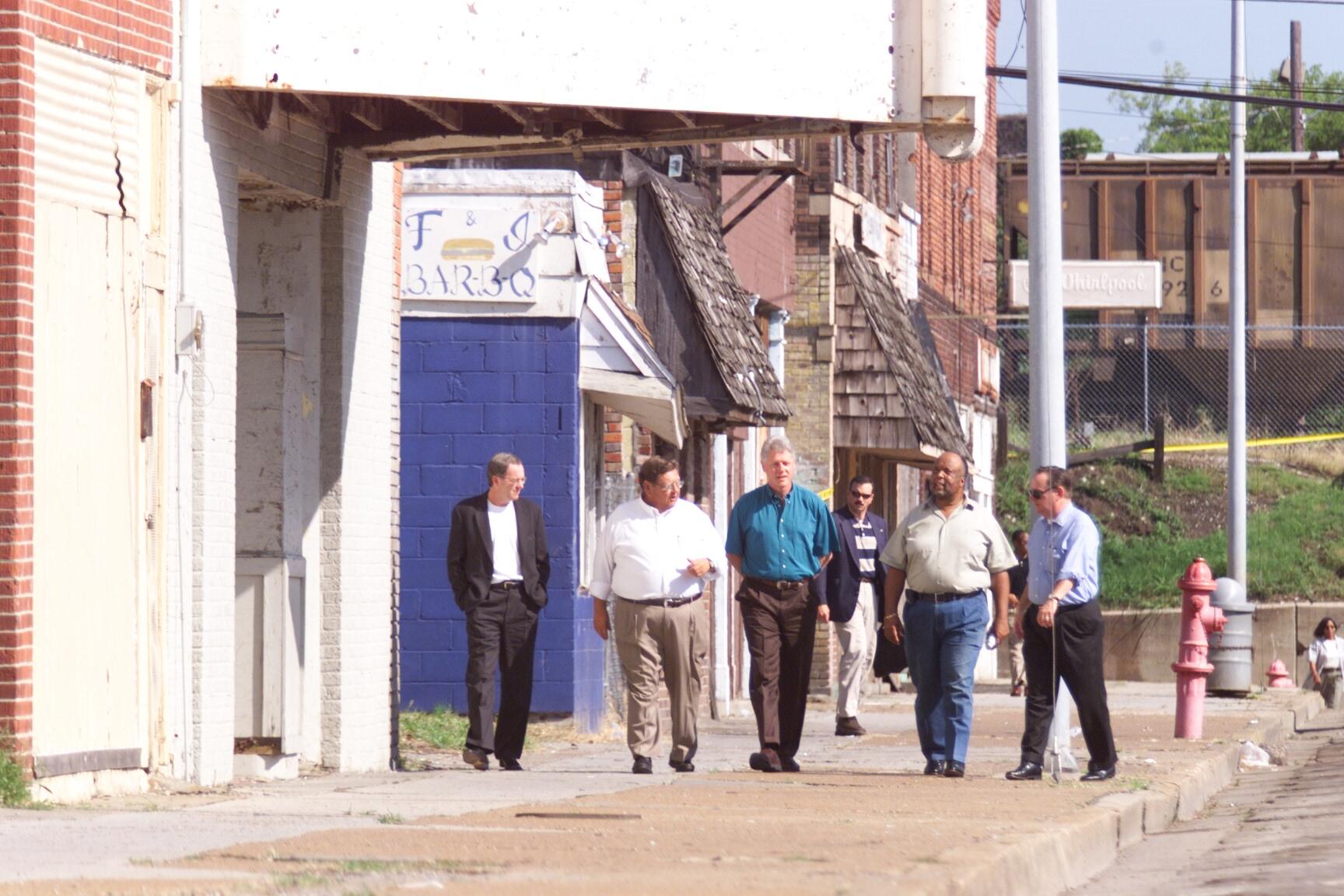
Thompson tours Clarksdale, Mississippi, with President Bill Clinton in 1999

=== Tenure ===
When Mike Espy resigned from the U.S. House of Representatives in Mississippi's 2nd congressional district to become Secretary of Agriculture in 1993, Thompson ran in the special election to succeed him. With five other Democrats splitting the vote, he finished second, behind Republican Hayes Dent with 28% of the vote in the March 30, 1993, primary election. He then defeated Dent in the April 13 runoff with 55% of the vote. He won the seat again in 1994 and has been reelected 12 times. He has faced serious opposition only twice, when journalist Clinton LeSueur held him to 55% in 2002 and 58% in 2004.

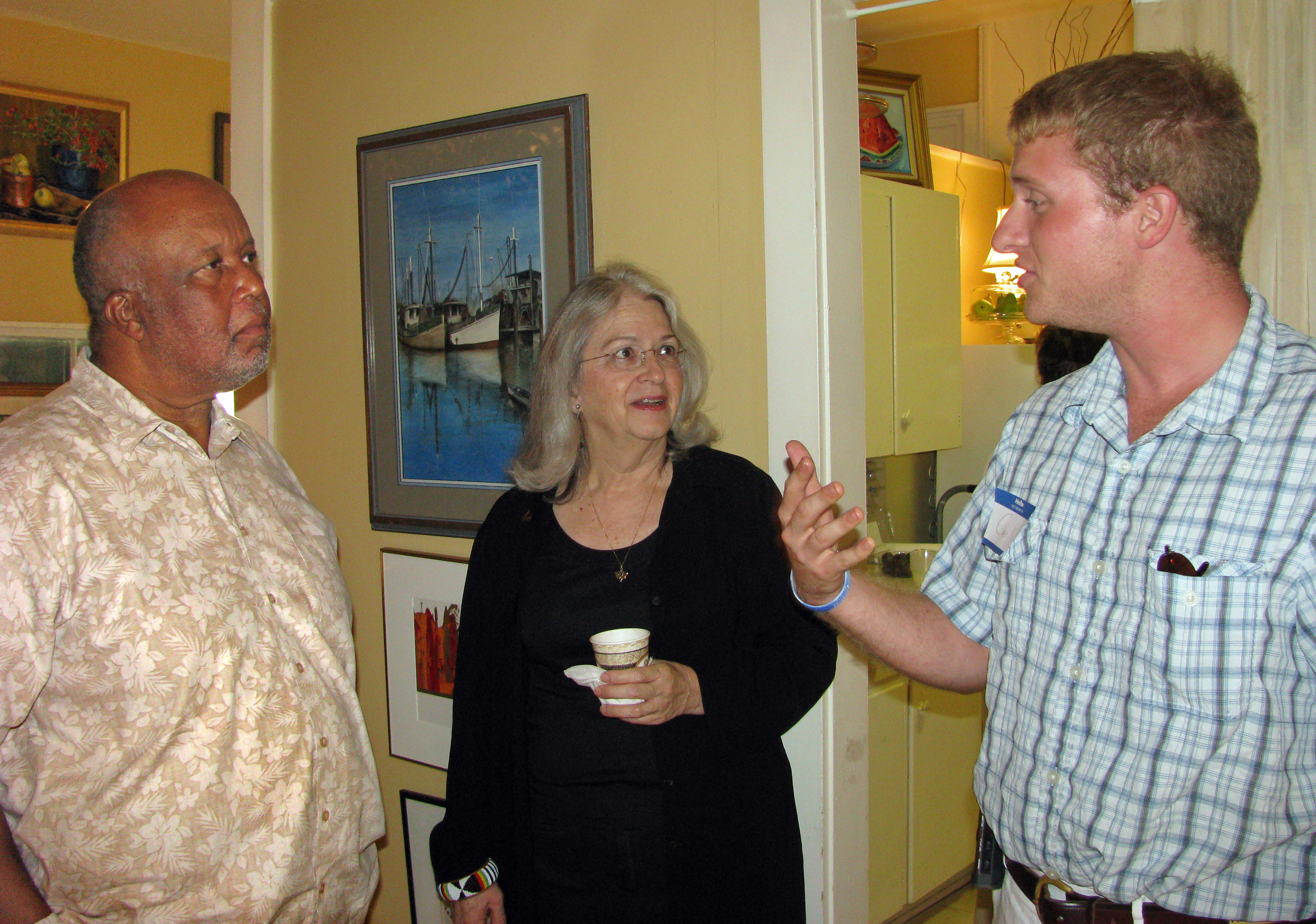
Thompson meeting with Mississippi Democrats

Thompson became an outspoken advocate for the Gulf Coast after Hurricanes Katrina and Rita hit in 2005. From his position on the Homeland Security Committee, he pushed for accountability at the Federal Emergency Management Agency (FEMA) and a careful review of the role of the Red Cross in the time of disaster. He also pursued waste, fraud, and abuse in hurricane contracting and called for preferences to be given to small and Gulf Coast businesses in the recovery and rebuilding of the affected states. Thompson is the founding member of the bipartisan Gulf Coast Recovery & Rebuilding Caucus in the House of Representatives.

Thompson's voting record has been decidedly liberal; he is by far the most liberal member of the Mississippi delegation and arguably one of the most liberal congressmen ever to represent the state. His legislative platform focuses mainly on homeland security, civil rights, agriculture and rural issues, equal education, and health care reform. In 1975, he became one of the original plaintiffs in the Ayers Case, which concerned the adequate funding of predominantly black educational institutes in Mississippi. In 2000, Thompson wrote legislation that created the National Center for Minority Health and Health Care Disparities.

During his tenure as chairman of the Homeland Security Committee, Thompson focused on assuring that state and local officials, as well as first responders (fire, police, EMTs), got the resources they needed to protect their communities. Thompson was particularly concerned about local officials getting adequate resources, having been a volunteer firefighter and a local elected official for 24 years.

Thompson was one of 31 House Democrats to object to the certification of the results of the 2004 presidential election in Ohio. President George W. Bush won Ohio, the state the representatives objected to counting, by 118,457 votes. Democrats claimed the results were tainted by irregularities or fraud. These claims were investigated and rejected by journalists, and Democratic nominee John Kerry, who did not contest the election result. As of 2021, Thompson stands by his vote, claiming it was "based on what the issues are at that time. But again, I didn't tear up the place because I cast a vote."

Along with John Conyers, in April 2006 Thompson brought an action against George W. Bush and others alleging violations of the Constitution in the passing of the Deficit Reduction Act of 2005. The case, Conyers v. Bush, was ultimately dismissed.

On January 5, 2007, Thompson introduced H.R.1, "Implementing the 9/11 Commission Recommendations Act of 2007", the first bill of the 110th Congress. The bill, cosponsored by more than 100 House Members, provided for the implementation of the 9/11 Commission's remaining recommendations. It included provisions requiring major improvements in aviation security, border security, and infrastructure security; providing first responders the equipment and training they need; beefing up efforts to prevent terrorists from acquiring weapons of mass destruction; and significantly expanding diplomatic, economic, educational, and other strategies designed to counter terrorism. The bill had bipartisan support and passed 299–128 on January 9, 2007. On July 27, 2007, the Conference Report on H.R. 1 passed the House overwhelmingly, 371–40. The previous day, it had passed the Senate 85–8. The President signed H.R. 1 into law on August 3, 2007.

With the passage of H.R. 1, Thompson is the first African-American Chairman of a House Committee to have a House–Senate Conference on the first bill introduced in either the House or the Senate in any given Congress.

On December 27, 2009, commenting on reports that Umar Farouk Abdulmutallab, who had allegedly tried to set off a suicide bomb on Northwest Airlines Flight 253 on December 25, 2009, had subsequently confessed to being trained and equipped in Yemen, Thompson called for a halt to all current plans with regard to Yemen in light of Abdulmutullab's ties there, including plans to repatriate approximately 80 Yemeni captives in Guantanamo.

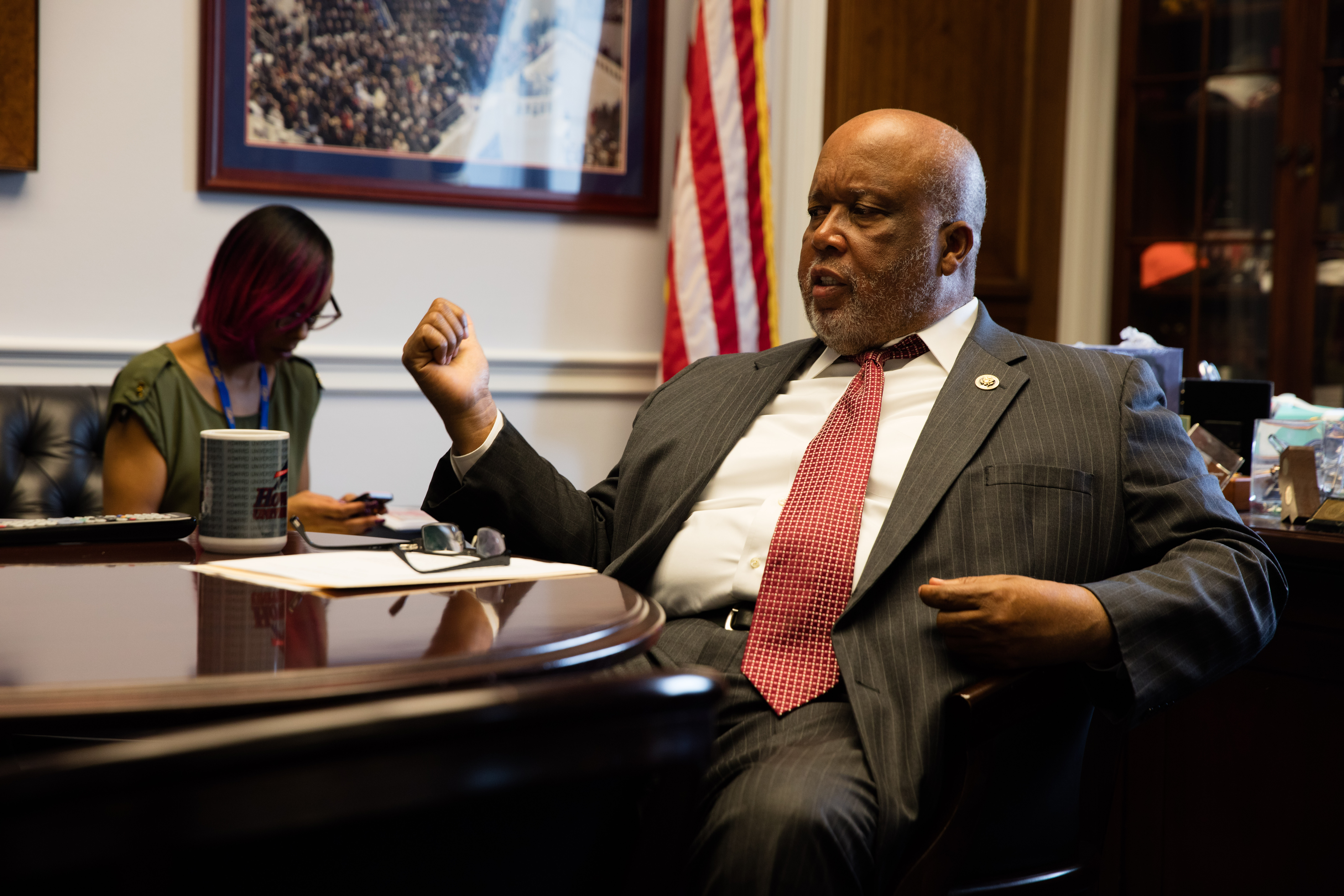
Thompson in his office in 2016

Thompson is a supporter, and one of the proposers of, a bill to prevent auto insurance companies from using credit scores to set their rates, which supporters claim would lower rates for Americans in financial struggle. The bill proposed that auto insurance rates be based solely on factors related to "skills and responsibility behind the wheel", excluding factors such as debt or poor credit elsewhere. The bill has not been enacted.

Thompson has also been a supporter of a measure to increase screening and background checks for pilot trainees to reduce chances of terrorist exploitation. The bill, H.R. 6159, would require all applicants to go through a waiting period while they are screened and cleared by the Department of Homeland Security. Currently, only foreign-born trainees are required to go through this screening. The bill has not been enacted.

In July 2014, Thompson joined Senator Ron Wyden in introducing a bill to limit the number of documents that are classified and to overhaul the security clearance system. The bill stalled and was not passed.

On April 1, 2020, Thompson and other Democratic lawmakers on the House Homeland Security Committee introduced legislation that would create a commission tasked with "producing a full and complete accounting of the nation's preparedness and response to the coronavirus". He compared this to the 9/11 Commission, saying, "while we don't yet know the full impact the coronavirus will have on the nation," already "more Americans have been killed by the virus than died in the September 11, 2001, attacks". A bipartisan group of House lawmakers would appoint 25 commission members, and 18 months after its initial meeting, a "public report detailing recommendations for the development of a national plan to address public health and the economic and social impacts of future pandemics" would be published.

For his tenure as the chairman of the House Homeland Security Committee in the 116th Congress, Thompson earned an "A" grade from the non-partisan Lugar Center's Congressional Oversight Hearing Index.

On March 3, 2021, Thompson was the only House Democrat to vote against the For the People Act, a top legislative priority of House Democrats that would reform campaign finance and election laws and expand voting rights. Despite initially cosponsoring the bill, Thompson said his vote "was no accident", explaining, "My constituents opposed the redistricting portion of the bill as well as the section on public finances. I always listen and vote in the interest of my constituents."

In April 2024, Thompson introduced (along with eight other Democrats) a bill to strip Secret Service protection from convicted felons (intended to include former President Donald Trump) after Trump was convicted in New York in May 2024.

=== Negotiating the January 6 Commission and chairing the Select Committee ===
On January 7, 2021, Thompson issued a statement about the January 6 United States Capitol attack. In the statement, he wrote, "There must be a thorough Congressional investigation into the clear and massive breakdowns in preparedness and response. My Committee has been examining the threat from domestic terrorism, right-wing extremism, and white nationalism for ten years and this will be at the top of our agenda for the new Congress."

On February 13, Speaker Nancy Pelosi announced plans for a bicameral commission to investigate the attack on the Capitol, modeled after the National Commission on Terrorist Attacks Upon the United States (9/11 Commission), an independent panel that investigated the attacks of September 11, 2001. The 9/11 Commission was created in 2002 by Congress and issued a detailed report on its findings 15 months later. Pelosi and Minority Leader Kevin McCarthy tasked Thompson and John Katko, the House Homeland Security Committee's highest-ranking members, with negotiating the commission's establishment resolution. Despite initial bipartisan support for a commission, by March, disputes between Democrats and Republicans over the proposed investigation's scope and whether the commission would have an equal number of members from each party stalled the commission's creation.

On May 14, 2021, Thompson and Katko announced H.R. 3233, The National Commission to Investigate the January 6 Attack on the United States Capitol Complex Act. The resolution introduced to the House on May 19 met all Republican objections; it contained an equal number of members from each party, required approval of both parties to issue subpoenas, and set a firm deadline of December 31, 2021, to complete the report. The bill to form the commission passed the House, 252–175, with 35 Republicans and every Democrat supporting it. On May 28, Senate Republicans used a filibuster to block taking up the bill. Thompson issued a statement denouncing Senate Republicans, calling it appalling that Mitch McConnell allowed the bill to be filibustered even after hearing from Officer Brian Sicknick's mother and her support for the bill.

On July 1, 2021, Speaker Nancy Pelosi chose Thompson to chair the United States House Select Committee on the January 6 Attack. According to Thompson's friends and advisors, his national security expertise qualified him to chair the committee. As chair, Thompson had the sole authority to sign and issue a subpoena. According to a Congressional Research Service survey, this was the only active House committee with this authorization in the 117th Congress, found under Section 5: Procedures in H.Res 503, as most House committees can issue and authorize subpoenas only with a majority vote of the committee/subcommittee or by consulting the ranking minority member. Most House committees can have a member designated by the committee to authorize subpoenas.

=== Committee assignments ===
For the 119th Congress:

- Committee on Homeland Security (Ranking Member)

=== Caucus memberships ===
- Congressional Black Caucus
- Congressional Gaming Caucus
- Congressional Rural Caucus
- Congressional Sunbelt Caucus
- Renewable Energy & Energy Efficiency Caucus
- Congressional Travel & Tourism Caucus
- Tennessee Valley Authority Caucus
- Congressional Children's Working Group
- National Guard & Reserve Components Congressional Members Organization
- Afterschool Caucuses
- United States–China Working Group
- Congressional Caucus on Turkey and Turkish Americans

=== Legislation sponsored ===
- Aviation Security Stakeholder Participation Act of 2013 (H.R. 1204; 113th Congress) – Thompson introduced this bill on March 14, 2013. If it became law, the bill would have directed the Transportation Security Administration (TSA) to establish in the TSA an Aviation Security Advisory Committee and consult with it about matters of aviation security.
- Thompson is also supporting a bill to prevent sleeping in United States Congress offices.

=== Electoral history ===
Mississippi's 2nd congressional district: Results 1993–2022
Year	Subject	Party	Votes	%	Opponent	Party	Votes	%	Opponent	Party	Votes	%	Opponent	Party	Votes	%
1993	Bennie Thompson	Democratic	72,561	55.2%	Hayes Dent	Republican	58,995	44.8%								
1994	Bennie Thompson	Democratic	68,014	53.7%	Bill Jordan	Republican	49,270	38.9%	Vincent Thornton	U.S. Taxpayers Party	9,408	7.4%				
1996	Bennie Thompson	Democratic	102,503	59.6%	Dana Covington	Republican	65,263	38.0%	William Chipman	Libertarian	4,167	2.4%				
1998	Bennie Thompson	Democratic	80,284	71.2%					William Chipman	Libertarian	32,533	28.8%				
2000	Bennie Thompson	Democratic	112,777	65.1%	Hardy Caraway	Republican	54,090	31.2%	William Chipman	Libertarian	4,305	2.5%	Lee Dilworth	Reform	4,167	2.4%
2002	Bennie Thompson	Democratic	89,913	55.1%	Clinton LeSueur	Republican	69,711	42.8%	Lee Dilworth	Reform	3,426	2.1%				
2004	Bennie Thompson	Democratic	154,626	58.4%	Clinton LeSueur	Republican	107,647	40.6%	Shawn O'Hara	Reform	2,596	1.0%				
2006	Bennie Thompson	Democratic	100,160	64.3%	Yvonne Brown	Republican	55,672	35.7%								
2008	Bennie Thompson	Democratic	201,606	69.1%	Richard Cook	Republican	90,364	30.9%								
2010	Bennie Thompson	Democratic	105,327	61.5%	Bill Marcy	Republican	64,499	37.6%	Ashley Norwood	Reform	1,530	.9%				
2012	Bennie Thompson	Democratic	214,978	67.1%	Bill Marcy	Republican	99,160	31.0%	Cobby Williams	Independent	4,605	1.4%	Lajena Williams	Reform	1,501	0.5%
2014	Bennie Thompson	Democratic	100,688	67.7%					Troy Ray	Independent	36,465	24.5%	Shelley Shoemake	Reform	11,493	7.7%
2016	Bennie Thompson	Democratic	192,343	67.1%	John Boule	Republican	83,542	29.1%	Troy Ray	Independent	6,918	2.4%	Johnny McLeod	Reform	3,823	1.3%
2018	Bennie Thompson	Democratic	158,921	71.8%					Troy Ray	Independent	48,104	21.7%	Irving Harris	Reform	14,354	6.5%
2020	Bennie Thompson	Democratic	196,331	66.2%	Brian Flowers	Republican	101,037	33.9%								
2022	Bennie Thompson	Democratic	108,285	60.1%	Brian Flowers	Republican	71,884	39.9%								
2024	Bennie Thompson	Democratic	177,885	62.0%	Ron Eller	Republican	108,956	38.0%								

== National politics ==
Thompson was the Permanent Chair of the 2020 Democratic National Convention.

=== Lawsuit against Trump ===
On February 16, 2021, on behalf of Thompson, the National Association for the Advancement of Colored People (NAACP) filed a federal lawsuit accusing Donald Trump of inciting violence on January 6 at the U.S. Capitol assault. The suit came three days after Trump was acquitted in the second Senate impeachment trial for inciting the riot. After the acquittal, Republican Senate Leader Mitch McConnell said in a speech he voted to acquit Trump because he believes the Senate cannot try a former president, but encouraged litigation against Trump, saying: "We have a criminal justice system in this country. We have civil litigation. And former presidents are not immune from being accountable by either one." Included in the lawsuit as defendants are Trump's personal lawyer Rudy Giuliani, and the two organizations the Proud Boys and Oath Keepers. The lawsuit alleges that, by preventing Congress "by the use of force, intimidation, and threat" from carrying out its constitutional duties (the 2021 United States Electoral College vote count) Trump, Giuliani and the two hate groups violated the 1871 Third Enforcement Act (also known as the Ku Klux Klan Act).

== Personal life ==
Thompson is married to London Johnson of Mound Bayou, Mississippi, and has a daughter, BendaLonne, a granddaughter, Jeanna, and a grandson, Thomas. He is a member of Kappa Alpha Psi fraternity (Gamma Rho – Tougaloo College) and a lifetime member of the Asbury United Methodist Church in Bolton.

== Recognition ==
In 1993, Thompson was inducted into the Tougaloo College Hall of Fame.

In January 2025, President Joe Biden named Thompson as a recipient of the Presidential Citizens Medal, along with nineteen others.

He was nominated for the 2025 Nobel Peace Prize for his "defense of freedom and democracy," along with the other members of the January 6th Committee.

== See also ==
- List of African-American United States representatives
- Final Report of the Task Force on Combating Terrorist and Foreign Fighter Travel

U.S. House of Representatives
Preceded by Mike Espy	Member of the U.S. House of Representatives from Mississippi's 2nd congressional district 1993–present	Incumbent
Preceded by Peter King	Chair of the House Homeland Security Committee; 2007–2011	Succeeded by Peter King
Preceded by Michael McCaul	Chair of the House Homeland Security Committee; 2019–2023	Succeeded by Mark Green
New office	Chair of the House January 6th Committee; 2021–2023	Position abolished
Party political offices
Preceded by Marcia Fudge	Permanent Chair of the Democratic National Convention; 2020	Succeeded by Minyon Moore
New office	Chair of the House Democratic Agriculture and Nutrition Task Force; 2023–2025	Position abolished
U.S. order of precedence (ceremonial)
Preceded by Nydia Velázquez	United States representatives by seniority 16th	Succeeded by Frank Lucas
Preceded by Ken Calvert	Order of precedence of the United States	Succeeded by Frank Lucas
