= Veterans Economic Opportunity Act of 2013 =

The Veterans Economic Opportunity Act of 2013
- Long title: To amend title 38, United States Code, to codify and improve the election requirements for the receipt of educational assistance under the Post-9/11 Educational Assistance program of the Department of Veterans Affairs.
- Nicknames: Veterans G.I. Bill Enrollment Clarification Act of 2013 (title as introduced)
- Announced in: the 113th United States Congress
- Sponsored by: Rep. Bill Flores (R, TX-17)
- Number of co-sponsors: 0

Codification
- Acts affected: Post-9/11 Veterans Educational Assistance Act of 2008
- U.S.C. sections affected: 38 U.S.C. § 3326, 38 U.S.C. ch. 30, 10 U.S.C. ch. 107, 10 U.S.C. ch. 1606, 10 U.S.C. ch. 1607, and others.
- Agencies affected: United States Department of Veterans Affairs

Legislative history
- Introduced in the House as H.R. 2481 by Rep. Bill Flores (R, TX-17) on June 25, 2013; Committee consideration by United States House Committee on Veterans' Affairs, United States House Veterans' Affairs Subcommittee on Economic Opportunity

The Veterans Economic Opportunity Act of 2013 (H.R. 2481), which was introduced as Veterans G.I. Bill Enrollment Clarification Act of 2013, is a bill that would make changes to several economic programs involving veterans. One provision would change how veterans' education benefits are processed. Another provision would increase funding on a program that helps homeless veterans. The bill was introduced into the United States House of Representatives during the 113th United States Congress.

== Background ==
The bill was introduced by Rep. Flores in response to a suggestion from the staff of the Department of Veterans' Affairs office in Atlanta. The staff found that many veterans were submitting the paperwork to take advantage of educational benefits, but were incorrectly applying for programs they weren't eligible for or that were outdated. Their solution was to allow the VA staff to correct these errors on the veterans' behalf instead of waiting for new paperwork. Veterans would be allowed to appeal these changes.

== Provisions of the bill ==
This summary is based largely on the summary provided by the Congressional Research Service, a public domain source.

The Veterans G.I. Bill Enrollment Clarification Act of 2013 would allow some individuals to elect to convert their educational assistance to the post-9/11 veterans' educational assistance program. Eligible individuals would be those who, as of August 1, 2009, met specified conditions with respect to their entitlements and elections under the all-volunteer force educational assistance program or certain other educational programs for professional military, selected reserve, or reserve component members. The bill would condition such post-9/11 program eligibility on the individual meeting the requirements for the post-9/11 program as of the date of election.

The bill would set forth transitional rules with respect to the transfer or revocation of entitlements from a previous assistance program after an election to convert to the post-9/11 program. The bill would require certain assistance to remain available to individuals under their previous program if it is not available under the post-9/11 program.

The bill would authorize the Secretary of Veterans Affairs (VA), if an individual submits an election that the Secretary determines is against the interests of the individual, to make an alternative election on the individual's behalf. It would allow such individual, during a specified period, to modify or revoke the Secretary's alternative selection.

== Congressional Budget Office report ==
This summary is based largely on the summary provided by the Congressional Budget Office, as ordered reported by the House Committee on Veterans’ Affairs on August 1, 2013. That is a public domain source.

H.R. 2481 would decrease direct spending by increasing the fees charged to certain veterans who obtain loans guaranteed by the Department of Veterans Affairs (VA). In addition, the bill would increase direct spending by enhancing certain protections for servicemembers and veterans with home mortgages, and by expanding eligibility for education scholarships. On net, the bill would decrease direct spending by $149 million over the 2014-2018 period and by $120 million over the 2014-2023 period, according to Congressional Budget Office (CBO) estimates. Pay-as-you-go procedures apply because enacting the legislation would affect direct spending and revenues. (The effect on revenues would be insignificant.)

H.R. 2481 also would increase spending subject to appropriation, primarily by extending the authorization of appropriations for a program that serves homeless veterans. The CBO estimated that implementing H.R. 2481 would have a discretionary cost of $218 million over the 2014-2018 period, subject to appropriation of the necessary amounts.

The bill would impose intergovernmental and private-sector mandates as defined in the Unfunded Mandates Reform Act (UMRA) by adding and expanding protections for servicemembers under the Servicemembers Civil Relief Act (SCRA). The CBO estimated that the costs to public and private entities of complying with the mandates would not exceed the thresholds established in UMRA for intergovernmental and private-sector mandates ($75 million and $150 million, respectively, in 2013, adjusted annually for inflation).

== Procedural history ==
=== House ===
The Veterans G.I. Bill Enrollment Clarification Act of 2013 was introduced into the House on June 25, 2013, by Rep. Bill Flores (R, TX-17). It was referred to the United States House Committee on Veterans' Affairs and the United States House Veterans' Affairs Subcommittee on Economic Opportunity. It was accompanied by House Report 113-207. On October 25, 2013, House Majority Leader Eric Cantor announced that H.R. 1742 would be on the House schedule for the week of October 28, 2013. It was scheduled for a vote on October 28, 2013, under a suspension of the rules. The House was expected to deal with six different bills related to Veterans all on the same day, including this bill.

== Debate and discussion ==
The organization Paralyzed Veterans of America supports the bill.

== See also ==
- List of bills in the 113th United States Congress
- G.I. Bill
- Post-9/11 Veterans Educational Assistance Act of 2008
