= United States House Veterans' Affairs Subcommittee on Oversight and Investigations =

Subcommittee of Committee on Veterans' Affairs
- Active United States House of Representatives; 119th Congress

Leadership
- Chair: Jen Kiggans (R)
- Ranking Member: Delia Ramirez (D)

Structure
- Seats: 7 (7 currently filled) 4/4 3/3
- Political parties: Majority (4): Republican (4); Minority (3): Democratic (3)

Meeting place
- 364, Cannon House Office Building; Washington, D.C. 20515

Phone number
- (202)-225-3527

The United States Veterans' Affairs Subcommittee on Oversight and Investigations is one of the four subcommittees within the House Veterans' Affairs Committee.

== Jurisdiction ==
The Subcommittee on Oversight and Investigations reviews the benefits and the health care services that the federal government provides to eligible veterans and family members. It also oversees the programs and operations of the Department of Veterans Affairs, as well as those of other federal agencies that pertain to veterans. In carrying out its responsibilities, the subcommittee conducts hearings, site visits and investigations nationwide. It also requests reports from the General Accounting Office, the Congressional Research Service and the VA's Office of the Inspector General. The subcommittee only has jurisdiction over such bills and resolutions as may be referred to it by the chairman of the full committee.

== Members, 119th Congress ==
Majority	Minority
Jen Kiggans, Virginia, Chair; Amata Coleman Radewagen, American Samoa; Juan Ciscomani, Arizona; Keith Self, Texas	Delia Ramirez, Illinois, Ranking Member; Tim Kennedy, New York; Herb Conaway, New Jersey
Ex officio
Mike Bost, Illinois	Mark Takano, California

== Historical membership rosters ==
=== 115th Congress ===
Majority	Minority
Jack Bergman, Michigan, Chairman; Mike Bost, Illinois; Bruce Poliquin, Maine; Neal Dunn, Florida; Jodey Arrington, Texas; Jenniffer Gonzalez, Puerto Rico	Ann McLane Kuster, New Hampshire, Ranking Member; Kathleen Rice, New York; Scott Peters, California; Gregorio Sablan, Northern Mariana Islands

=== 116th Congress ===
Majority	Minority
Chris Pappas, New Hampshire, Chair; Kathleen Rice, New York; Max Rose, New York; Gil Cisneros, California; Colin Peterson, Minnesota	Jack Bergman, Michigan, Ranking Member; Amata Coleman Radewagen, American Samoa; Mike Bost, Illinois; Chip Roy, Texas

=== 117th Congress ===
Majority	Minority
Chris Pappas, New Hampshire, Chair; Conor Lamb, Pennsylvania; Elaine Luria, Virginia; Lauren Underwood, Illinois; Gregorio Sablan, Northern Mariana Islands	Tracey Mann, Kansas, Ranking Member; Amata Coleman Radewagen, American Samoa; Jack Bergman, Michigan

=== 118th Congress ===
Majority	Minority
Jen Kiggans, Virginia, Chair; Amata Coleman Radewagen, American Samoa; Jack Bergman, Michigan; Matt Rosendale, Montana	Frank J. Mrvan, Indiana, Ranking Member; Chris Pappas, New Hampshire; Sheila Cherfilus-McCormick, Florida
Ex officio
Mike Bost, Illinois	Mark Takano, California
