= United States House Veterans' Affairs Subcommittee on Health =

Subcommittee of Committee on Veterans' Affairs
- Active United States House of Representatives; 119th Congress

Leadership
- Chair: Mariannette Miller-Meeks (R)
- Ranking Member: Julia Brownley (D)

Structure
- Seats: 12 (11 currently filled) 7/7 4/5
- Political parties: Majority (7): Republican (7); Minority (4): Democratic (4)

Meeting place
- 364, Cannon House Office Building; Washington, D.C. 20515

Phone number
- (202)-225-3527

The United States Veterans' Affairs Subcommittee on Health is one of the four subcommittees within the House Veterans' Affairs Committee. The Subcommittee on Health has legislative and oversight jurisdiction for the Department of Veterans Affairs’ health care system, programs and research apparatus.

== Jurisdiction ==
The Subcommittee on Health has legislative, oversight and investigative jurisdiction over the Veterans Health Administration including medical services, medical support and compliance, medical facilities, medical and prosthetic research, and major and minor construction.

== Members, 119th Congress ==
Majority	Minority
Mariannette Miller-Meeks, Iowa, Chair; Jack Bergman, Michigan; Greg Murphy, North Carolina; Derrick Van Orden, Wisconsin; Jen Kiggans, Virginia; Abraham Hamadeh, Arizona; Kimberlyn King-Hinds, Northern Mariana Islands	Julia Brownley, California, Ranking Member; Sheila Cherfilus-McCormick, Florida (until April 21, 2026); Maxine Dexter, Oregon; Herb Conaway, New Jersey; Kelly Morrison, Minnesota
Ex officio
Mike Bost, Illinois	Mark Takano, California

== Historical membership rosters ==
=== 115th Congress ===
Majority	Minority
Brad Wenstrup, Ohio, Chair; Gus Bilirakis, Florida; Amata Coleman Radewagen, American Samoa; Neal Dunn, Florida; John Rutherford, Florida; Clay Higgins, Louisiana; Jenniffer Gonzalez, Puerto Rico	Julia Brownley, California, Ranking Member; Mark Takano, California; Ann McLane Kuster, New Hampshire; Beto O'Rourke, Texas; Lou Correa, California

=== 116th Congress ===
Majority	Minority
Julia Brownley, California, Chair; Conor Lamb, Pennsylvania; Mike Levin, California; Anthony Brindisi, New York; Max Rose, New York; Gil Cisneros, California; Colin Peterson, Minnesota	Neal Dunn, Florida, Ranking Member; Amata Coleman Radewagen, American Samoa; Andy Barr, Kentucky; Dan Meuser, Pennsylvania; Greg Steube, Florida

=== 117th Congress ===
Majority	Minority
Julia Brownley, California, Chair; Frank J. Mrvan, Indiana; Conor Lamb, Pennsylvania; Mike Levin, California; Gregorio Sablan, Northern Mariana Islands; Lauren Underwood, Illinois; Colin Allred, Texas; Lois Frankel, Florida	Jack Bergman, Michigan, Ranking Member; Amata Coleman Radewagen, American Samoa; Chip Roy, Texas; Greg Murphy, North Carolina; Matt Rosendale, Montana; Mariannette Miller-Meeks, Iowa

=== 118th Congress ===
Majority	Minority
Mariannette Miller-Meeks, Iowa, Chair; Amata Coleman Radewagen, American Samoa; Jack Bergman, Michigan, Greg Murphy, North Carolina; Derrick Van Orden, Wisconsin; Morgan Luttrell, Texas; Jen Kiggans, Virginia	Julia Brownley, California, Ranking Member; Mike Levin, California; Chris Deluzio, Pennsylvania; Greg Landsman, Ohio; Nikki Budzinski, Illinois
Ex officio
Mike Bost, Illinois	Mark Takano, California
