= United States House Veterans' Affairs Subcommittee on Economic Opportunity =

Subcommittee of Committee on Veterans' Affairs
- Active United States House of Representatives; 119th Congress

Leadership
- Chair: Derrick Van Orden (R)
- Ranking Member: Chris Pappas (D)

Structure
- Seats: 9 (9 currently filled) 5/5 4/4
- Political parties: Majority (5): Republican (5); Minority (4): Democratic (4)

Meeting place
- 364, Cannon House Office Building; Washington, D.C. 20515

Phone number
- (202)-225-3527

The United States Veterans' Affairs Subcommittee on Economic Opportunity is one of the four subcommittees within the House Veterans' Affairs Committee.

== Jurisdiction ==
From the House Rules:

- Subcommittee on Economic Opportunity, which shall have legislative, oversight and investigative jurisdiction over education of veterans, employment and training of veterans, vocational rehabilitation, veterans’ housing programs, readjustment of servicemembers to civilian life, and servicemembers civil relief.

== Members, 119th Congress ==
Majority	Minority
Derrick Van Orden, Wisconsin, Chair; Juan Ciscomani, Arizona; Abraham Hamadeh, Arizona; Kimberlyn King-Hinds, Northern Mariana Islands; Tom Barrett, Michigan	Chris Pappas, New Hampshire, Ranking Member; Morgan McGarvey, Kentucky; Delia Ramirez, Illinois; Tim Kennedy, New York
Ex officio
Mike Bost, Illinois	Mark Takano, California

== Historical membership rosters ==
=== 115th Congress ===
Majority	Minority
Jodey Arrington, Texas, Chairman; Gus Bilirakis, Florida; Brad Wenstrup, Ohio; John Rutherford, Florida; Jim Banks, Indiana	Beto O'Rourke, Texas, Ranking Member; Mark Takano, California; Lou Correa, California; Kathleen Rice, New York

=== 116th Congress ===
Majority	Minority
Mike Levin, California, Chair; Kathleen Rice, New York; Anthony Brindisi, New York; Chris Pappas, New Hampshire; Elaine Luria, Virginia; Susie Lee, Nevada; Joe Cunningham, South Carolina	Gus Bilirakis, Florida, Ranking Member; Jack Bergman, Michigan; Jim Banks, Indiana; Andy Barr, Kentucky; Dan Meuser, Pennsylvania

=== 117th Congress ===
Majority	Minority
Mike Levin, California, Chair; Chris Pappas, New Hampshire; Anthony Brown, Maryland; David Trone, Maryland; Ruben Gallego, Arizona	Barry Moore, Alabama, Ranking Member; Tracey Mann, Kansas; Nancy Mace, South Carolina; Madison Cawthorn, North Carolina

=== 118th Congress ===
Majority	Minority
Derrick Van Orden, Wisconsin, Chair; Nancy Mace, South Carolina; Scott Franklin, Florida; Juan Ciscomani, Arizona; Eli Crane, Arizona	Mike Levin, California, Ranking Member; Frank J. Mrvan, Indiana; Morgan McGarvey, Kentucky; Delia Ramirez, Illinois
Ex officio
Mike Bost, Illinois	Mark Takano, California
