= Scott Franklin (politician) =

American politician (born 1964)

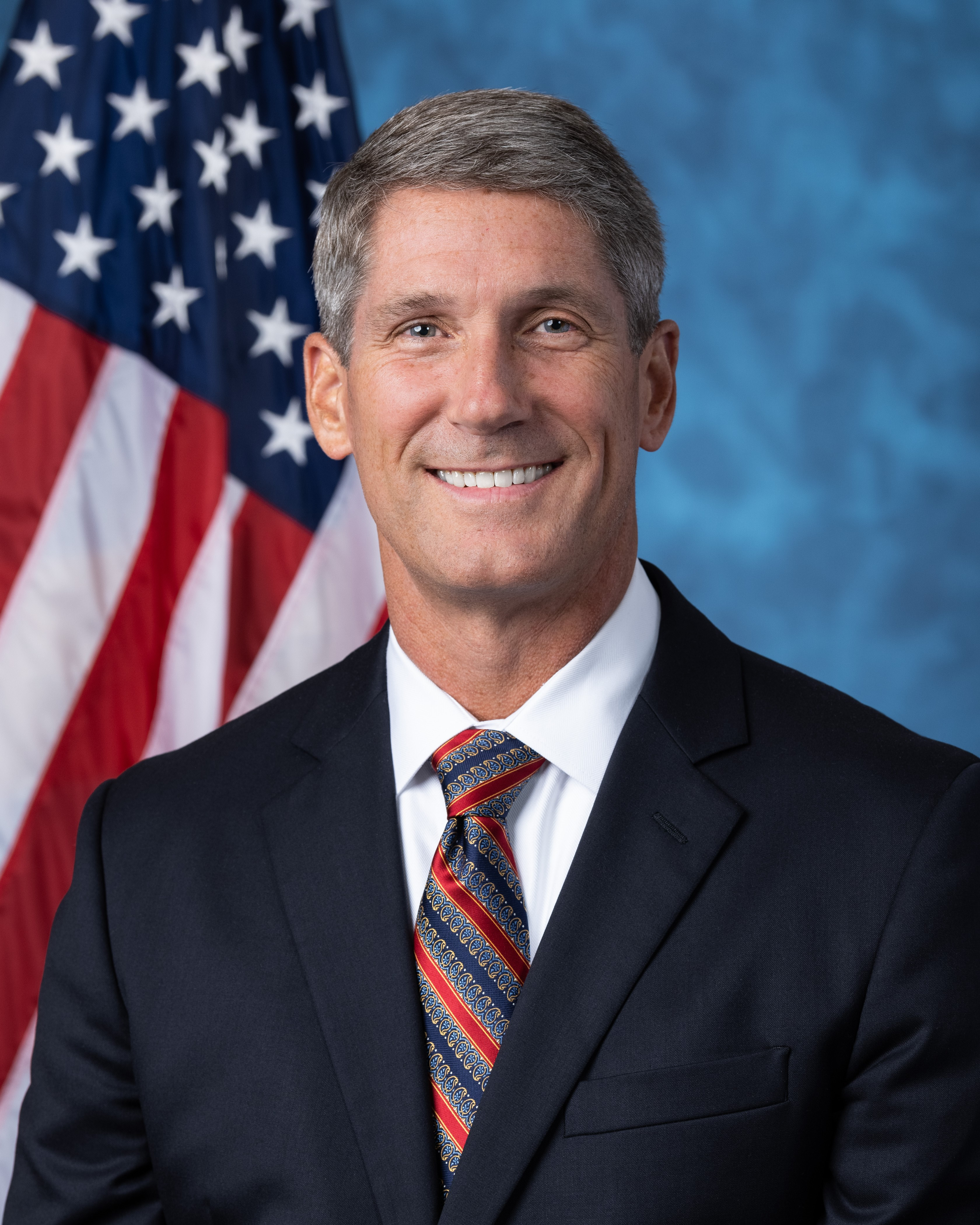
- Official portrait, 2020

Member of the U.S. House of Representatives from Florida
- Incumbent
- Assumed office January 3, 2021
- Preceded by: Ross Spano
- Constituency: 15th district (2021–2023); 18th district (2023–present)

Member of the Lakeland City Commission from the Southeast district
- In office January 1, 2018 – January 3, 2021
- Preceded by: Edie Yates
- Succeeded by: Don Selvage

Personal details
- Born: Clifford Scott Franklin; August 23, 1964 (age 61) Thomaston, Georgia, U.S.
- Party: Republican
- Spouse: Amy Wood
- Children: 3
- Education: United States Naval Academy (BS); Embry-Riddle Aeronautical University, Daytona Beach (MBA)
- Website: House website Campaign website

Military service
- Allegiance: United States
- Branch/service: United States Navy
- Years of service: 1986–2012
- Rank: Commander
- Unit: Naval Aviator

Clifford Scott Franklin (born August 23, 1964) is an American politician and businessman who has served in the United States House of Representatives since 2021. He represented Florida's 15th congressional district from 2021 to 2023, and has represented Florida's 18th district since 2023. He is a member of the Republican Party.

== Early life and career ==
Born in Thomaston, Georgia, Franklin was raised in Lakeland, Florida. He earned a Bachelor of Science degree from the United States Naval Academy in 1986 and served in the United States Navy as a Naval Aviator flying the S-3 Viking off of multiple aircraft carriers and routinely deploying overseas. Franklin later earned a Master of Business Administration from Embry–Riddle Aeronautical University and is a graduate of the Armed Forces Staff College.

== Career ==
Franklin spent 26 years in the Navy, 14 on active duty and 12 in the Naval Reserve, including being mobilized/recalled to active duty with U.S. Central Command after the September 11 attacks. He retired with the rank of Commander.

In 2000, Franklin joined Lanier Upshaw, an insurance agency, and became its chief executive officer. In 2017, he was elected as a city commissioner for the Southeast district of Lakeland, Florida, succeeding longtime incumbent Edie Yates. Because of his run for Congress, Franklin was required to resign his seat on the city commission; he chose to make his resignation effective on January 3, 2021, the day he was sworn into Congress. Franklin was succeeded on the city commission by Don Selvage, a former commissioner who held the seat as an interim appointee from January 4 until the April 6 special election to fill the vacancy.

== U.S. House of Representatives ==
=== Elections ===
==== 2020 ====
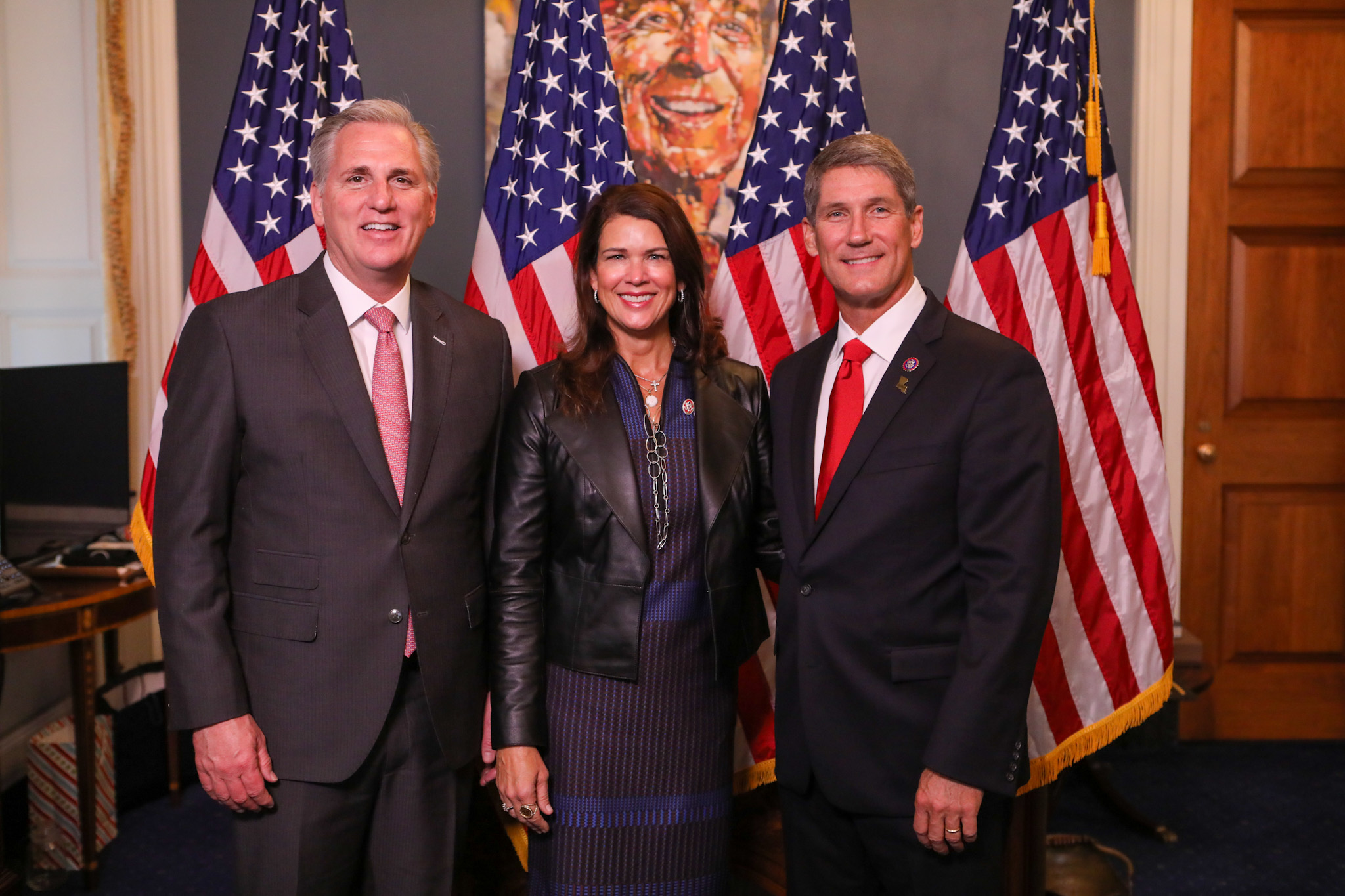
Scott and his wife Amy with House minority leader Kevin McCarthy

In March 2020, Franklin announced his primary bid against freshman congressman Ross Spano, who was facing investigation by federal investigators over financial irregularities. Franklin won the primary, receiving his party's nomination for the general election, in which he defeated Democratic nominee Alan Cohn.

=== Committee assignments ===
For the 118th Congress:

- Committee on Appropriations
  - Subcommittee on Agriculture, Rural Development, Food and Drug Administration, and Related Agencies
  - Subcommittee on the Legislative Branch
  - Subcommittee on Military Construction, Veterans Affairs, and Related Agencies
- Committee on Science, Space, and Technology
  - Subcommittee on Research and Technology
- Committee on Veterans' Affairs
  - Subcommittee on Disability Assistance and Memorial Affairs
  - Subcommittee on Economic Opportunity

=== Caucus memberships ===
- Republican Study Committee

== Political positions ==
Franklin voted to provide Israel with support following 2023 Hamas attack on Israel. Franklin voted against the Honoring our PACT Act of 2022 which expanded VA benefits to veterans exposed to toxic chemicals during their military service.

== Electoral history ==
Lakeland City Commissioner Southeast district election, 2017
Party	Candidate	Votes	%
Nonpartisan	Scott Franklin	8,394	64.6
Nonpartisan	Sandy Toledo	4,604	35.4
Total votes		12,998	100.0

Florida's 15th congressional district Republican primary, 2020
Party	Candidate	Votes	%
Republican	Scott Franklin	30,736	51.2
Republican	Ross Spano (incumbent)	29,265	48.8
Total votes		60,001	100.0

Florida's 15th congressional district election, 2020
Party	Candidate	Votes	%
Republican	Scott Franklin	216,374	55.4
Democratic	Alan Cohn	174,297	44.6
Total votes		390,671	100.0
Republican hold			

Florida's 18th congressional district election, 2022
Party	Candidate	Votes	%
Republican	Scott Franklin (incumbent)	167,429	74.7
Independent	Keith Hayden Jr	56,647	25.3
Independent	Leonard Serratore (write-in)	158	0.1
Total votes		224,234	100.0
Republican hold			

Florida's 18th congressional district, 2024
Party	Candidate	Votes	%
Republican	Scott Franklin (incumbent)	225,170	65.30
Democratic	Andrea Doria Kale	119,637	34.70
Total votes		344,807	100.00
Republican hold			

== Personal life ==
Franklin is a Presbyterian.

U.S. House of Representatives
Preceded by Ross Spano	Member of the U.S. House of Representatives from Florida's 15th congressional district 2021–2023	Succeeded by Laurel Lee
Preceded by Brian Mast	Member of the U.S. House of Representatives from Florida's 18th congressional district 2023–present	Incumbent
U.S. order of precedence (ceremonial)
Preceded by Scott L. Fitzgerald	United States representatives by seniority 251st	Succeeded by Andrew Garbarino
