= Morgan McGarvey =

American politician (born 1979)

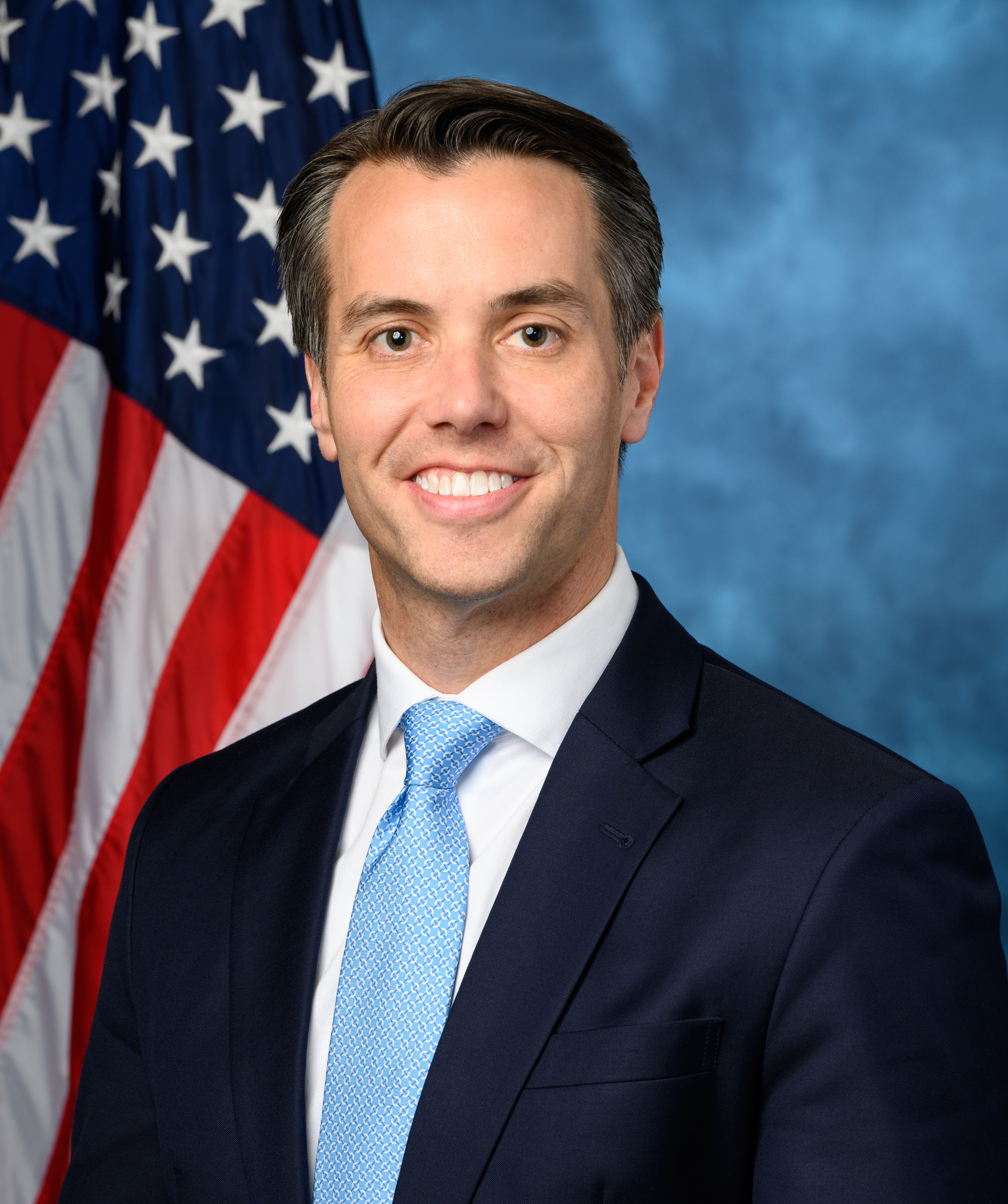
- Official portrait, 2022

Member of the U.S. House of Representatives from Kentucky's 3rd district
- Incumbent
- Assumed office January 3, 2023
- Preceded by: John Yarmuth

Minority Leader of the Kentucky Senate
- In office January 8, 2019 – January 2, 2023
- Preceded by: Ray Jones II
- Succeeded by: Gerald Neal

Member of the Kentucky Senate from the 19th district
- In office December 4, 2012 – January 2, 2023
- Preceded by: Tim Shaughnessy
- Succeeded by: Cassie Chambers Armstrong

Personal details
- Born: John Morgan McGarvey; December 23, 1979 (age 46) Louisville, Kentucky, U.S.
- Party: Democratic
- Spouse: Chris Danner
- Children: 3
- Education: University of Missouri (BA); University of Kentucky (JD)
- Website: House website Campaign website

John Morgan McGarvey (born December 23, 1979) is an American attorney and politician serving as the U.S. representative for Kentucky's 3rd congressional district since 2023. He is a member of the Democratic Party.

Previously, McGarvey represented the 19th district in the Kentucky Senate from 2012 to 2023. In 2018, he was elected minority leader, becoming one of the youngest members of a state legislature to serve in a leadership role.

McGarvey was first elected to Congress in 2022. He was the only Democrat in Kentucky's congressional delegation until 2026 when Zach Dembo won the 6th district.

== Early life and education ==
McGarvey was born in Louisville, Kentucky, and attended duPont Manual High School. He earned a bachelor's degree in journalism from the University of Missouri and a Juris Doctor from the University of Kentucky College of Law. He is the son of John McGarvey, a staff member for former Kentucky Governor Wendell Ford and the city attorney for Anchorage, Kentucky, since 1987.

== Early political career ==
Before his election to the Kentucky State Senate, McGarvey worked for Jack Conway as a Special Assistant Attorney General of Kentucky. He also worked for U.S. Representative Ben Chandler and the law firm Frost Brown Todd. McGarvey practices law at Morgan Pottinger McGarvey, a firm his grandfather founded.

=== Kentucky Senate ===
McGarvey was first elected in the 2012 election for Kentucky State Senate District 19. He defeated three other candidates in the Democratic primary on May 22, 2012, with 40.7% of the vote and was unopposed in the general election on November 6. In 2016, he was reelected to a second four-year term, defeating Republican nominee Larry West in the general election. In 2018, he became minority floor leader for the Kentucky State Senate. On November 3, 2020, McGarvey was elected to a third term unopposed.

In the Senate, his committee assignments included the Appropriations and Revenue Committee, Medicaid Oversight and Advisory Committee, the Banking and Insurance Committee, the State and Local Government Committee, and the Elections, Constitutional Amendments, and Intergovernmental Affairs Task Force.

Mothers Against Drunk Driving named McGarvey its 2015 Legislator of the Year. The Foundation for Advancing Alcohol Responsibility gave him a Leadership Award. McGarvey was named a Most Valuable Policymaker by Greater Louisville Inc. and 2016 Outstanding Young Professional by the University of Kentucky College of Law.

== U.S. House of Representatives ==
=== 2022 election ===
On October 12, 2021, McGarvey launched a campaign to represent Kentucky's 3rd congressional district after Kentucky's sole Democratic U.S. representative, John Yarmuth, announced his retirement from the seat. In the primary election, McGarvey defeated state Representative Attica Scott. McGarvey won the general election and joined Congress in January 2023.

McGarvey opposed President Trump's "One, Big Beautiful" Budget Reconciliation Bill in 2025 and said "To pay for it, kids in Kentucky will go hungry, nursing homes and hospitals will close, and millions of Americans will be kicked off their health insurance. It’s wrong."

=== Joe Biden ===
On July 19, 2024, McGarvey called for Joe Biden to withdraw from the 2024 United States presidential election.

=== Committee assignments ===
For the 119th Congress:

- Committee on the Budget
- Committee on Small Business
  - Subcommittee on Economic Growth, Tax, and Capital Access
  - Subcommittee on Innovation, Entrepreneurship, and Workforce Development
- Committee on Veterans' Affairs
  - Subcommittee on Disability Assistance and Memorial Affairs (Ranking Member)
  - Subcommittee on Economic Opportunity

=== Caucus memberships ===
- Black Maternal Health Caucus
- Congressional Progressive Caucus
- Future Forum
- New Democrat Coalition
- Congressional Equality Caucus
- Congressional Caucus for the Equal Rights Amendment
- Congressional Bus Caucus
- Rare Disease Caucus

== Personal life ==
McGarvey and his wife, Chris, live in the Strathmoor neighborhood, a part of the Highlands in Louisville, with their three children.

The life of McGarvey's family has been documented by photographer Pam Spaulding for over forty years beginning before McGarvey was born. Spaulding began the project while working at the Louisville Courier-Journal newspaper and published photos of the McGarveys in the 2009 book An American Family: Three Decades with the McGarveys, published by National Geographic. Spaulding continues to work documenting the McGarveys today.

== Electoral history ==
Kentucky State Senate, District 19 Democratic Primary, 2012
Party	Candidate	Votes	%
Democratic	Morgan McGarvey	5,030	40.7%
Democratic	Sarah Lynn Cunningham	4,261	34.5%
Democratic	Amy E. Shoemaker	1,812	14.7%
Democratic	Gary Demling	1,253	10.1%
Total votes		12,356	100.0%

Kentucky State Senate, District 19 General Election, 2012
Party	Candidate	Votes	%
Democratic	Morgan McGarvey	39,327	100%
Total votes		39,327	100.0%

Kentucky State Senate, District 19 General Election, 2016
Party	Candidate	Votes	%
Democratic	Morgan McGarvey (incumbent)	39,026	61.71%
Republican	Larry West	24,214	38.29%
Total votes		63,240	100.0%

Kentucky State Senate, District 19 General Election, 2020
Party	Candidate	Votes	%
Democratic	Morgan McGarvey	50,867	100.0%
Total votes		50,867	100.0%

Kentucky 3rd Congressional District Democratic Primary, 2022
Party	Candidate	Votes	%
Democratic	Morgan McGarvey	52,157	63.34%
Democratic	Attica Scott	30,183	36.66%
Total votes		82,340	100.0%

Kentucky 3rd Congressional District General Election, 2022
Party	Candidate	Votes	%
Democratic	Morgan McGarvey	160,920	61.99%
Republican	Stuart Ray	98,637	38.00%
Write-in		30	0.01%
Total votes		259,587	100.0%

Kentucky 3rd Congressional District Democratic Primary, 2024
Party	Candidate	Votes	%
Democratic	Morgan McGarvey (incumbent)	44,275	84.11%
Democratic	Geoffrey M. "Geoff" Young	5,875	11.16%
Democratic	Jared Randall	2,491	4.73%
Total votes		52,641	100.0%

Kentucky 3rd Congressional District General Election, 2024
Party	Candidate	Votes	%
Democratic	Morgan McGarvey (incumbent)	203,100	61.95%
Republican	Mike Craven	124,713	38.04%
Write-in		51	0.02%
Total votes		327,864	100.0%

Kentucky Senate
Preceded by Ray Jones II	Minority Leader of the Kentucky Senate; 2019–2023	Succeeded by Gerald Neal
U.S. House of Representatives
Preceded by John Yarmuth	Member of the U.S. House of Representatives from Kentucky's 3rd congressional district 2023–present	Incumbent
U.S. order of precedence (ceremonial)
Preceded by Rich McCormick	United States representatives by seniority 334th	Succeeded by Rob Menendez
