= United States House Veterans' Affairs Subcommittee on Technology Modernization =

Subcommittee of Committee on Veterans' Affairs
- Active United States House of Representatives; 119th Congress

Leadership
- Chair: Tom Barrett (R)
- Ranking Member: Nikki Budzinski (D)

Structure
- Seats: 5 (4 currently filled) 3/3 1/2
- Political parties: Majority (3): Republican (3); Minority (1): Democratic (1)

Meeting place
- 364, Cannon House Office Building; Washington, D.C. 20515

Phone number
- (202)-225-3527

The United States Veterans' Affairs Subcommittee on Technology Modernization is one of the five subcommittees within the House Veterans' Affairs Committee.

== Jurisdiction ==
The Subcommittee on Technology Modernization has oversight and investigative jurisdiction over the Department of Veterans Affairs’ enterprise technology modernization programs and projects, including the Electronic Health Record Modernization (EHRM) program.

== Members, 119th Congress ==
Majority	Minority
Tom Barrett, Michigan, Chair; Nancy Mace, South Carolina; Morgan Luttrell, Texas	Nikki Budzinski, Illinois, Ranking Member; Sheila Cherfilus-McCormick, Florida
Ex officio
Mike Bost, Illinois	Mark Takano, California

== Historical subcommittee rosters ==
=== 115th Congress ===
Majority	Minority
Jim Banks, Indiana, Chairman; Jack Bergman, Michigan; Mike Coffman, Colorado	Conor Lamb, Pennsylvania, Ranking Member; Scott Peters, California

=== 116th Congress ===
Majority	Minority
Susie Lee, Nevada, Chair; Julia Brownley, California; Conor Lamb, Pennsylvania; Joe Cunningham, South Carolina	Jim Banks, Indiana, Ranking Member; Steve Watkins, Kansas; Chip Roy, Texas

=== 117th Congress ===
Majority	Minority
Frank J. Mrvan, Indiana, Chair; Anthony Brown, Maryland; Mark Takano, California	Matt Rosendale, Montana, Ranking Member; Jim Banks, Indiana

=== 118th Congress ===
Majority	Minority
Matt Rosendale, Montana Chair; Nancy Mace, South Carolina; Keith Self, Texas	Sheila Cherfilus-McCormick, Florida, Ranking Member; Greg Landsman, Ohio
Ex officio
Mike Bost, Illinois	Mark Takano, California
