= Max Rose =

American politician (born 1986)

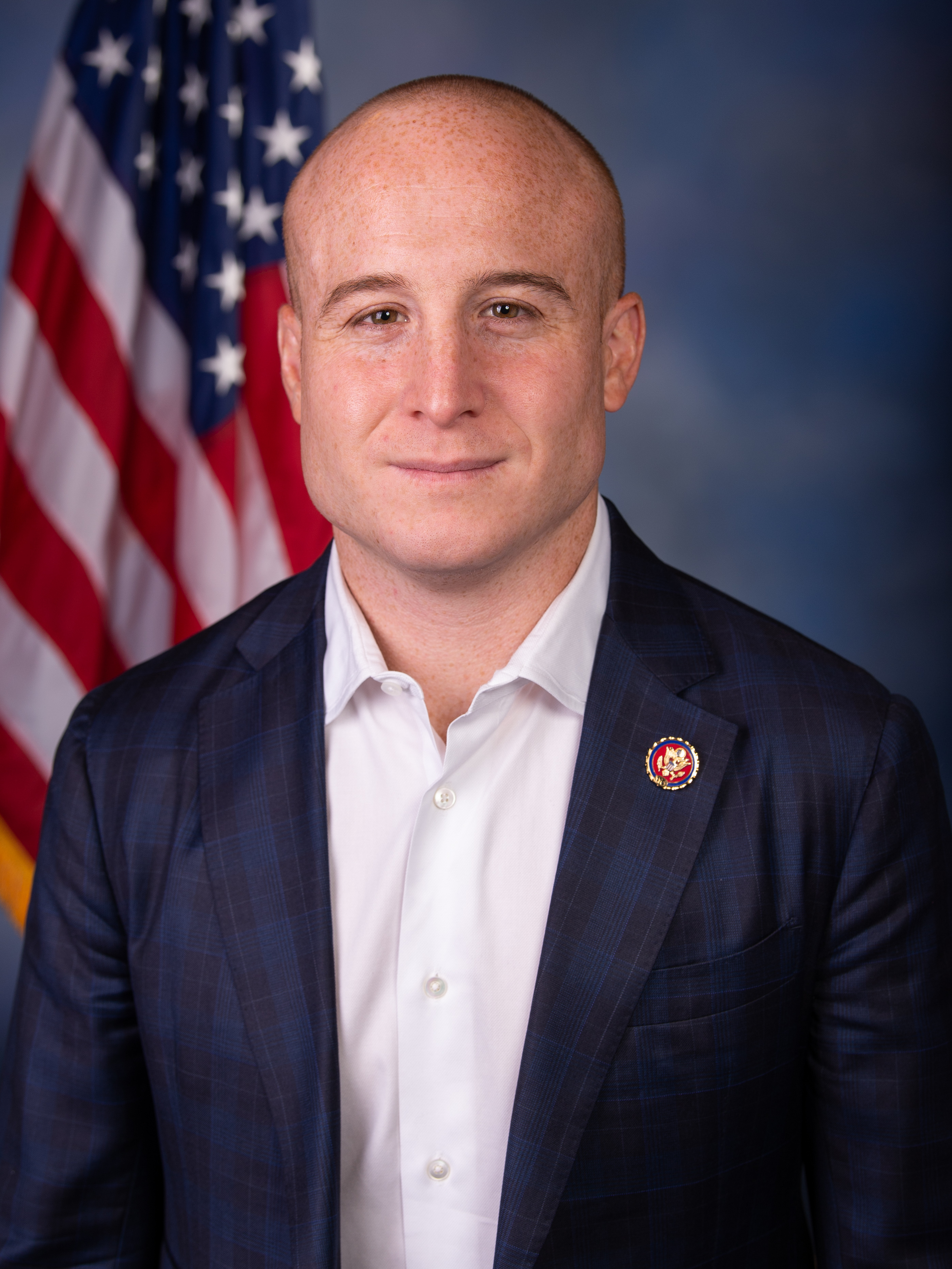
- Official portrait, 2019

Member of the U.S. House of Representatives from New York's 11th district
- In office January 3, 2019 – January 3, 2021
- Preceded by: Dan Donovan
- Succeeded by: Nicole Malliotakis

Personal details
- Born: November 28, 1986 (age 39) New York City, New York, U.S.
- Party: Democratic
- Spouse: Leigh Byrne (m. 2018)
- Children: 1
- Education: Wesleyan University (BA); London School of Economics (MSc); University of Oxford

Military service
- Allegiance: United States
- Branch/service: United States Army
- Years of service: 2010–2015 (active); 2015–present (Guard)
- Rank: Captain
- Unit: 1st Armored Division; 69th Infantry Regiment
- Battles/wars: War in Afghanistan
- Awards: Bronze Star; Purple Heart; Combat Infantryman Badge; Ranger tab; Secretary of Defense Medal for Outstanding Public Service

Max Rose (born November 28, 1986) is an American politician and military officer who served as the U.S. representative for New York's 11th congressional district from 2019 to 2021. A moderate Democrat, he served in the Biden administration as senior advisor to the United States secretary of defense for COVID-19 from January 2021 to July 2021.

From 2012 to 2013, Rose served in the U.S. Army as a platoon leader in combat in the War in Afghanistan. Wounded while on duty, he was awarded a Bronze Star and Purple Heart. In 2018, Rose defeated Republican incumbent Dan Donovan to represent New York's 11th congressional district, including Staten Island and parts of southern Brooklyn. In the 2020 election, Rose lost to the Republican nominee, Nicole Malliotakis. In December 2021, Rose announced his candidacy in the 2022 U.S. House of Representatives elections to regain his former seat; in a rematch of the 2020 race, he was defeated by Malliotakis, 62% to 38%.

== Early life and education ==
Rose was born in Brooklyn, New York. He is Jewish. His mother is a public school teacher and professor of social work and his father is a medical laboratory executive.

Rose grew up primarily in Park Slope, and attended elementary school there. He celebrated his bar mitzvah at Union Temple of Brooklyn in Prospect Heights.

=== Education ===
Rose attended high school at Poly Prep Country Day School in Dyker Heights, Brooklyn. He captained its wrestling team and graduated in 2004.

He subsequently received a bachelor's degree in history from Wesleyan University, graduating in 2008. Rose became involved in politics while a student at Wesleyan University; he worked as an intern for U.S. Senator Cory Booker while Booker was mayor of Newark, New Jersey.

He later earned a master's degree in philosophy and public policy from the London School of Economics, studying there in 2008 and 2009. He also attended the University of Oxford.

== Career ==
=== Military service ===
Rose commissioned in the United States Army in 2010. He served nearly five years of active duty with the U.S. Army 1st Armored Division. In 2012 and 2013, he was a first lieutenant platoon leader during the War in Afghanistan, where he led a combat outpost of 30 American soldiers and suffered wounds to his face and right knee in 2013 after his Stryker armored fighting vehicle hit an improvised explosive device in northern Kandahar Province. During his service, he earned the Ranger tab (in Fort Benning), as well as on deployment in Afghanistan the Combat Infantryman Badge, a Bronze Star and a Purple Heart.

He serves as a company commander in the New York Army National Guard with the 69th Infantry Battalion, the second-oldest unit in the United States. In March 2020, while serving as a member of Congress, Rose deployed with the National Guard to assist New York City's coronavirus pandemic response effort. He and his unit spent two weeks turning a Staten Island psychiatric center into an emergency hospital for patients with COVID-19.

=== Post-military career ===
After leaving full-time military service, Rose served as director of public engagement for Brooklyn district attorney Kenneth P. Thompson. Thompson was Brooklyn's first Black district attorney. Rose worked on an initiative known as "Begin Again," helping people with outstanding warrants for minor offenses address them and clean their records.

Later, he served as chief of staff at Brightpoint Health, a nonprofit operator of medical outpatient clinics in Staten Island and elsewhere in New York City with 800 employees.

== U.S. House of Representatives ==
=== Elections ===
==== 2018 ====
Rose ran in the 2018 Democratic Party primary for New York's 11th congressional district against five other candidates, winning with 65% of the vote. In the general election, he faced Republican incumbent Dan Donovan and received endorsements from former president Barack Obama and former vice president Joe Biden. Rose defeated Donovan, 53% to 47%, a win widely seen as an upset as most ratings of the race considered Donovan, who had won the 2016 election by 25 points, a slight favorite. He became the youngest male member of the House of Representatives.

The 11th has historically been the most conservative district in New York City, as Staten Island is the city's most conservative borough. For most of the time since the 1990s, it has been the only Republican-held district in the city, and for much of that time it has been the only area in the city in which Republicans usually do well. It has a Cook Partisan Voting Index of R+3; the other 11 districts in the city have PVIs of at least D+20. Rose was only the second Democrat to hold the seat since 1981, as well as the first since then to unseat an incumbent Republican. His victory made New York City's House delegation entirely Democratic for the second time since 1933.

==== 2020 ====
In 2020, Rose was defeated in his reelection bid by state assemblywoman Nicole Malliotakis, who represented much of the district's eastern portion. He conceded on November 11. Ultimately, Malliotakis took 53% of the vote to Rose's 47%. Rose was hampered by Donald Trump carrying Staten Island with 57% of the vote, the most of any borough and ahead of Queens. Rose's participation in a George Floyd protest was also blamed for hurting his reelection chances as the 11th district has historically been home to large numbers of New York City Police Department (NYPD) officers and their families.

==== 2022 ====
In December 2021, Rose announced he was running for Congress to reclaim his former seat in 2022. He won the Democratic primary on August 23, 2022, receiving 75% of the vote. He was defeated in a landslide in the November 8, 2022 general election by Malliotakis, 62% to 38%.

=== Committee assignments ===
- Committee on Homeland Security
  - Subcommittee on Emergency Preparedness, Response and Recovery
  - Subcommittee on Intelligence and Counterterrorism (chair)
- Committee on Veterans' Affairs
  - Subcommittee on Health
  - Subcommittee on Oversight and Investigations

=== Caucus memberships ===
- Blue Dog Coalition
- Congressional LGBT Equality Caucus
- Future Forum
- New Democrat Coalition
- Problem Solvers Caucus

== Post-House career ==
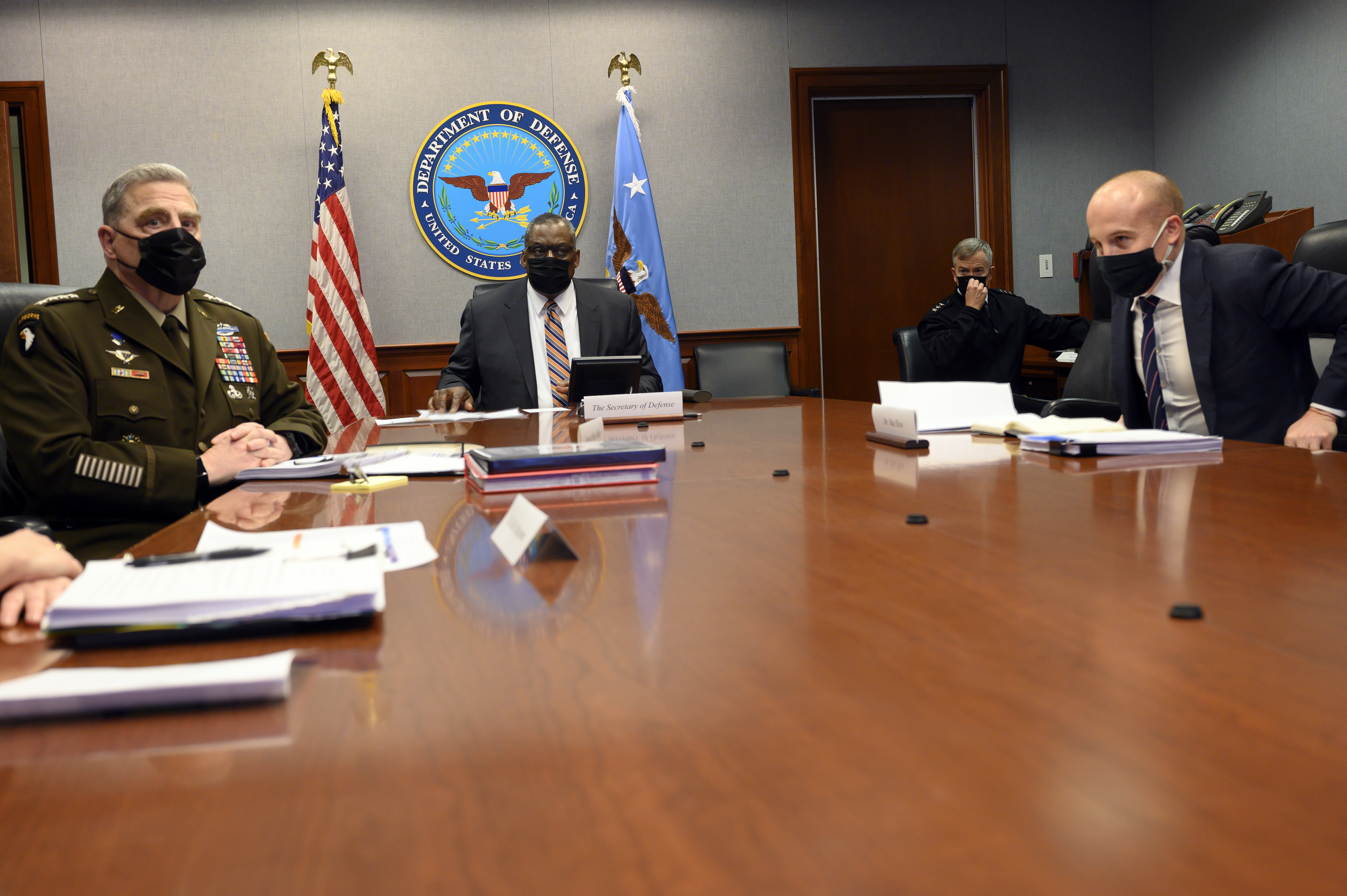
Rose attends a COVID-19 meeting with Defense Secretary Lloyd Austin and Chairman of the Joint Chiefs of Staff Mark Milley at the Pentagon, January 2021

On December 10, 2020, Rose opened a campaign account with the campaign finance board to raise money for the 2021 New York City mayoral election, but announced on January 3, 2021, that he would not run.

On January 20, 2021, Rose was sworn in as Special Assistant to the Secretary of Defense (Senior Advisor, COVID-19) to serve under Lloyd Austin, a position Rose held until July 21, 2021

Rose is an advisor for the VoteVets PAC and the pro-artificial intelligence lobbying group Leading the Future.

== Political positions ==
Rose has described himself as an "old-school Democrat". Rose was a member of the bipartisan Problem Solvers Caucus and the conservative Blue Dog Coalition.

=== Foreign policy ===
He believes that the United States should rejoin the United Nations Framework Convention on Climate Change's Paris Agreement as a way to lower carbon dioxide emissions.

In March 2019, in response to Alexandria Ocasio-Cortez's view that Congress "could have leaned more on the larger role of other agencies before Congress decided to invade a nation without a concrete end plan," Rose wrote to the New York Daily News: "I believe it's long past time we end the war in Afghanistan, but I strongly disagree with the idea that the invasion was wrong on moral or national security grounds ... After our city and country were attacked we were very clear with the Taliban—either they give up Osama bin Laden and al Qaeda, or we would come and get them ourselves ... They chose to protect Osama bin Laden, and they rightfully paid the price."

Rose urged the State Department to designate Ukraine's Azov Battalion (converted into a Ukrainian National Guard regiment) a Foreign Terrorist Organization.

=== Guns and policing ===
He supports criminal background checks for gun purchases, and an assault rifle ban. In 2019, the U.S. House of Representatives passed its first piece of gun-safety legislation since 1994, the Bipartisan Background Checks Act, co-sponsored by Rose, mandating federal criminal background checks for all gun transfers, including private transactions.

He called for higher salaries for police officers and more accountability for New York Police Department leadership.

=== Other ===
He supports expanding access to clinics for treating opioid addiction. Rose supports improving transportation infrastructure in Southern Brooklyn and Staten Island.

On October 2, 2019, Rose announced his support for an impeachment inquiry against Donald Trump for his attempt to pressure Ukraine into interfering in the 2020 presidential election.

He voted against Democrat Nancy Pelosi for Speaker of the United States House of Representatives.

== Electoral history ==
New York's 11th congressional district Democratic primary results, 2018
Party	Candidate	Votes	%
Democratic	Max Rose	11,539	63.3
Democratic	Michael DeVito Jr.	3,642	20.0
Democratic	Omar Vaid	1,589	8.7
Democratic	Radhakrishna Mohan	719	4.0
Democratic	Paul Sperling	486	2.7
Democratic	Zach Emig	249	1.4
Total votes		18,224	100.0

New York's 11th congressional district, 2018
Party	Candidate	Votes	%
Democratic	Max Rose	96,850	50.4
Working Families	Max Rose	3,894	2.0
Women's Equality	Max Rose	1,079	0.6
Total	Max Rose	101,823	53.0
Republican	Dan Donovan	80,440	41.9
Conservative	Dan Donovan	7,352	3.8
Independence	Dan Donovan	1,302	0.7
Reform	Dan Donovan	347	0.2
Total	Dan Donovan (incumbent)	89,441	46.6
Green	Henry Bardel	774	0.4
Total votes		192,038	100.0
Democratic gain from Republican			

New York's 11th congressional district, 2020
Party	Candidate	Votes	%
Democratic	Max Rose	134,625	46.0%
Independence	Max Rose	2,573	0.8%
Total	Max Rose (incumbent)	137,198	46.8%
Republican	Nicole Malliotakis	143,420	49.0%
Conservative	Nicole Malliotakis	12,188	4.2%
Total	Nicole Malliotakis	155,608	53.2%
Total votes		292,806	100.0

New York's 11th congressional district Democratic primary results, 2022
Party	Candidate	Votes	%
Democratic	Max Rose	15,871	75.0
Democratic	Brittany Ramos DeBarros	4,399	20.8
Democratic	Komi Agoda-Koussema	899	4.2
Total votes		21,169	100.0

New York's 11th congressional district, 2022
Party	Candidate	Votes	%
Republican	Nicole Malliotakis	107,989	56.5
Conservative	Nicole Malliotakis	8,003	4.1
Total	Nicole Malliotakis (incumbent)	115,992	60.7
Democratic	Max Rose	71,801	37.5
Total votes		191,083	100%

== Personal life ==
Rose moved to Bay Ridge, Brooklyn, in 2015. He and his wife Leigh Byrne, a fashion stylist, were married in March 2018. They reside in St. George, Staten Island. In 2020, the couple adopted a son.

== See also ==
- 2018 United States House of Representatives election in New York, District 11
- New York's 11th congressional district
- List of Jewish members of the United States Congress

U.S. House of Representatives
Preceded by Dan Donovan	Member of the U.S. House of Representatives from New York's 11th congressional district 2019–2021	Succeeded by Nicole Malliotakis
U.S. order of precedence (ceremonial)
Preceded by Antonio Delgado as Former U.S. Representative	Order of precedence of the United States as Former U.S. Representative	Succeeded by Chris Jacobs as Former U.S. Representative
