= United States House Veterans' Affairs Subcommittee on Disability Assistance and Memorial Affairs =

Subcommittee of Committee on Veterans' Affairs
- Active United States House of Representatives; 119th Congress

Leadership
- Chair: Morgan Luttrell (R)
- Ranking Member: Morgan McGarvey (D)

Structure
- Seats: 9 (9 currently filled) 5/5 4/4
- Political parties: Majority (5): Republican (5); Minority (4): Democratic (4)

Meeting place
- 364, Cannon House Office Building; Washington, D.C. 20515

Phone number
- (202)-225-3527

The United States Veterans' Affairs Subcommittee on Disability Assistance and Memorial Affairs is one of the four subcommittees within the House Veterans' Affairs Committee.

== Jurisdiction ==
From the House Rules:

- Subcommittee on Disability Assistance and Memorial Affairs, which shall have legislative, oversight and investigative jurisdiction over compensation; general and special pensions of all the wars of the United States; life insurance issued by the Government on account of service in the Armed Forces; cemeteries of the United States in which veterans of any war or conflict are or may be buried, whether in the United States or abroad, except cemeteries administered by the Secretary of the Interior; burial benefits; the Board of Veterans' Appeals; and the Court of Appeals for Veterans' Claims.

== Membership, 119th Congress ==
Majority	Minority
Morgan Luttrell, Texas, Chair; Amata Coleman Radewagen, American Samoa; Jack Bergman, Michigan; Nancy Mace, South Carolina; Keith Self, Texas	Morgan McGarvey, Kentucky, Ranking Member; Chris Pappas, New Hampshire; Maxine Dexter, Oregon; Kelly Morrison, Minnesota
Ex officio
Mike Bost, Illinois	Mark Takano, California

== Historical membership rosters ==
=== 115th Congress ===
Majority	Minority
Mike Bost, Illinois, Chair; Mike Coffman, Colorado; Amata Coleman Radewagen, American Samoa; Jack Bergman, Michigan; Jim Banks, Indiana	Elizabeth Esty, Connecticut, Ranking Member; Julia Brownley, California; Gregorio Sablan, Northern Mariana Islands

=== 116th Congress ===
Majority	Minority
Elaine Luria, Virginia, Chair; Gil Cisneros, California; Gregorio Sablan, Northern Mariana Islands; Colin Allred, Texas; Lauren Underwood, Illinois	Mike Bost, Illinois, Ranking Member; Gus Bilirakis, Florida; Steve Watkins, Kansas; Greg Steube, Florida

=== 117th Congress ===
Majority	Minority
Elaine Luria, Virginia, Chair; Elissa Slotkin, Michigan; Marcy Kaptur, Ohio; Raul Ruiz, California; David Trone, Maryland	Troy Nehls, Texas, Ranking Member; Barry Moore, Alabama; Mariannette Miller-Meeks, Iowa

=== 118th Congress ===
Majority	Minority
Morgan Luttrell, Texas, Chair; Scott Franklin, Florida; Juan Ciscomani, Arizona; Eli Crane, Arizona; Keith Self, Texas	Chris Pappas, New Hampshire Ranking Member; Chris Deluzio, Pennsylvania; Morgan McGarvey, Kentucky; Delia Ramirez, Illinois
Ex officio
Mike Bost, Illinois	Mark Takano, California
