= Nikki Budzinski =

American politician (born 1977)

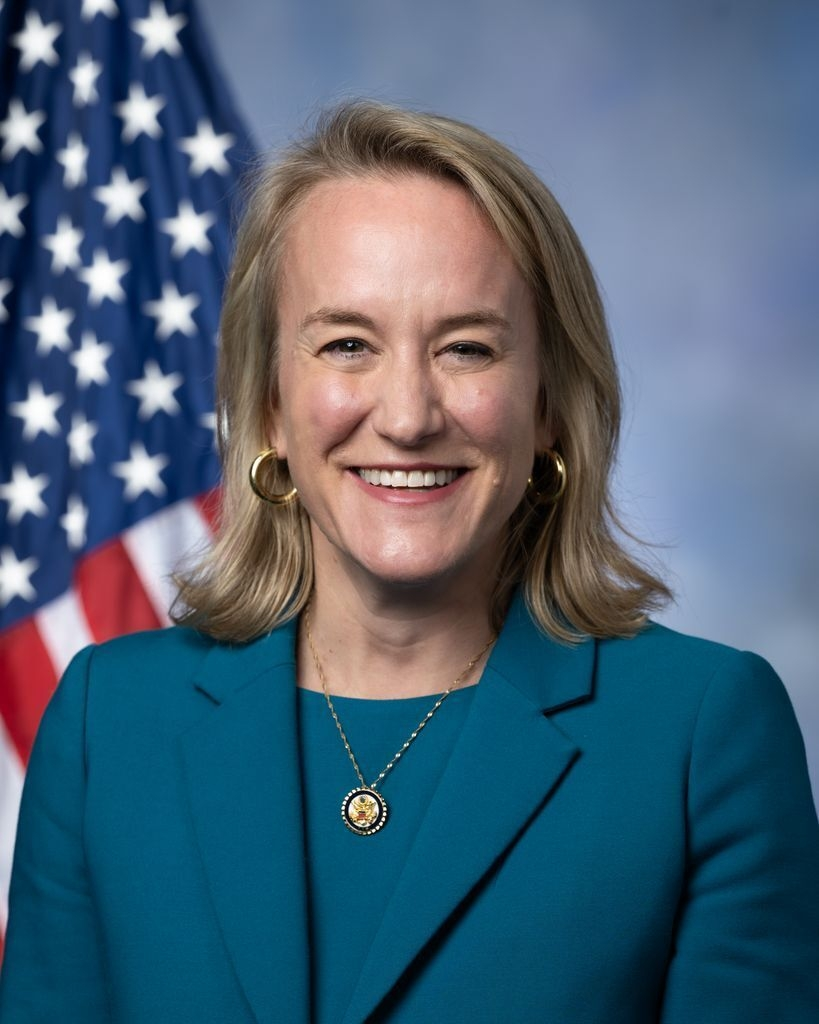
- Official portrait, 2025

Member of the U.S. House of Representatives from Illinois's 13th district
- Incumbent
- Assumed office January 3, 2023
- Preceded by: Rodney Davis (redistricted)

Personal details
- Born: Nicole Jai Budzinski; March 11, 1977 (age 49) Peoria, Illinois, U.S.
- Party: Democratic
- Education: University of Illinois, Urbana-Champaign (BA)
- Website: House website Campaign website

Nicole Jai Budzinski (/bədˈzɪnski/ bəd-ZIN-skee; pol. /bud͡ʑiɲski/) (born March 11, 1977) is an American trade unionist and politician. A member of the Democratic Party, she has served as the U.S. representative for Illinois's 13th congressional district since 2023.

Budzinski worked for most of her career for trade unions. Just before being elected, Budzinski served as chief of staff to the director of the Office of Management and Budget (OMB) in the Biden administration beginning in 2021.

== Early life and education ==
Budzinski was born in Peoria, Illinois. Her paternal grandparents were both union members: Leonard Budzinski, her grandfather, as a painter employed by the Peoria School District, and her grandmother as a teacher in the same district.

Budzinski graduated from the University of Illinois Urbana-Champaign and interned for U.S. Representative Dick Gephardt, U.S. Senator Paul Simon, and Planned Parenthood.

== Early career ==
Budzinski started her career at the Laborers' International Union of North America and the International Association of Fire Fighters before spending seven years with the United Food and Commercial Workers (UFCW) unions. She worked for the UFCW as national political director in Washington, D.C.

During the 2018 Illinois gubernatorial election, Budzinski led J. B. Pritzker's exploratory committee and was later a senior advisor to his campaign, focusing on political strategy, messaging and outreach. After Pritzker won, she was named transition director.

When Pritzker became governor on January 14, 2019, Budzinski was appointed senior advisor. She simultaneously chaired the Broadband Advisory Council (BAC), a state agency "charged with ... expand[ing] broadband access, adoption, and utilization" in Illinois. Budzinski resigned as senior advisor to the governor in March 2020. She worked with John Podesta to advise the National Climate Jobs Resource Center and was Executive Director for Climate Jobs Illinois.

In February 2021, Budzinski, recommended for the post by Podesta, was appointed chief of staff of the Office of Management and Budget (OMB). During her tenure as chief of staff, she helped set up the OMB's Made in America division. On July 16, 2021, Budzinski resigned to return to Illinois, saying she "felt it was a good time to come back [to Illinois] ... after getting things off the ground here".

== U.S. House of Representatives ==
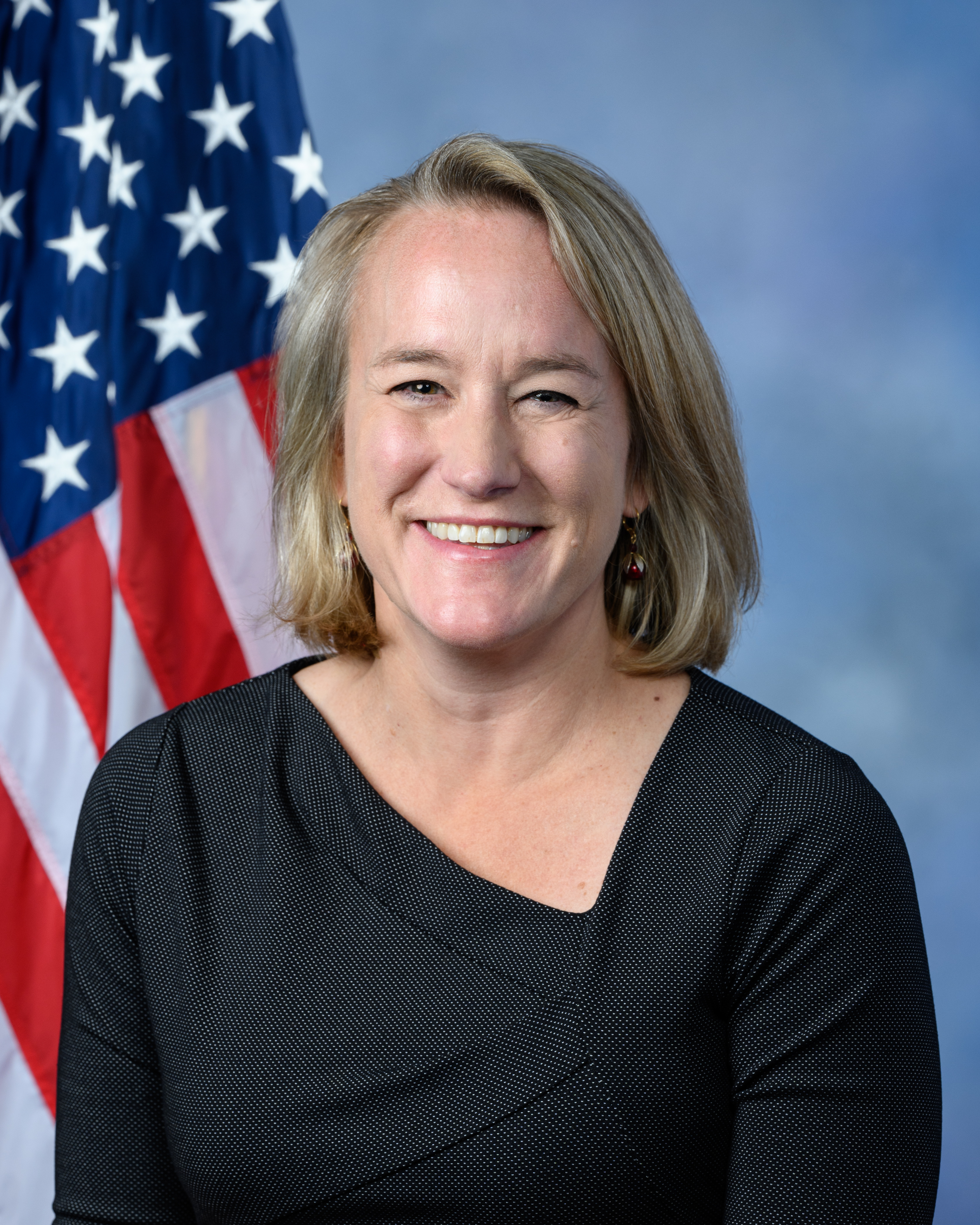
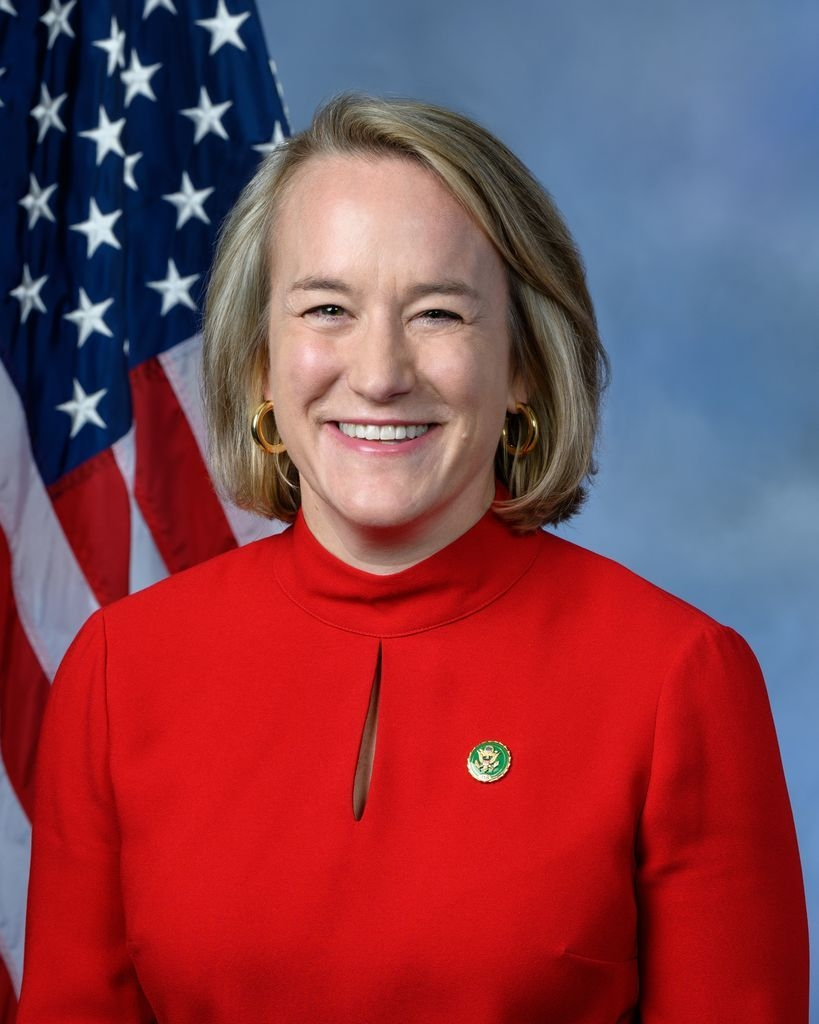
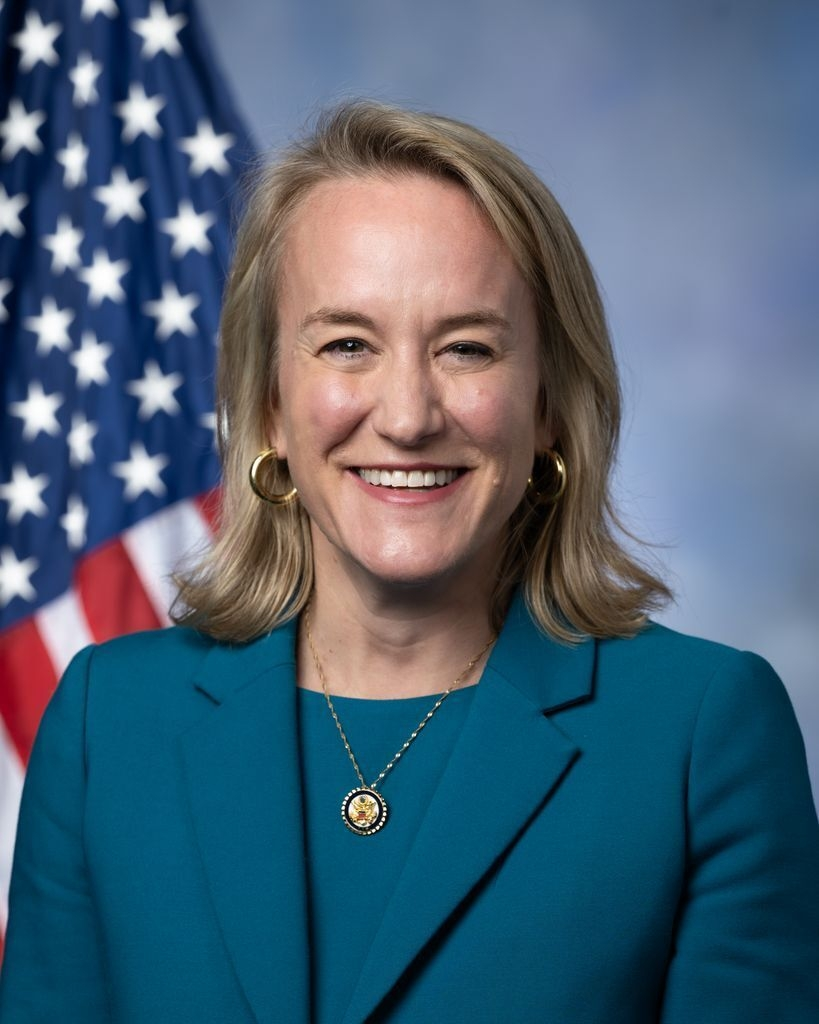
Budzinski's official House portraits over the years.

=== Elections ===
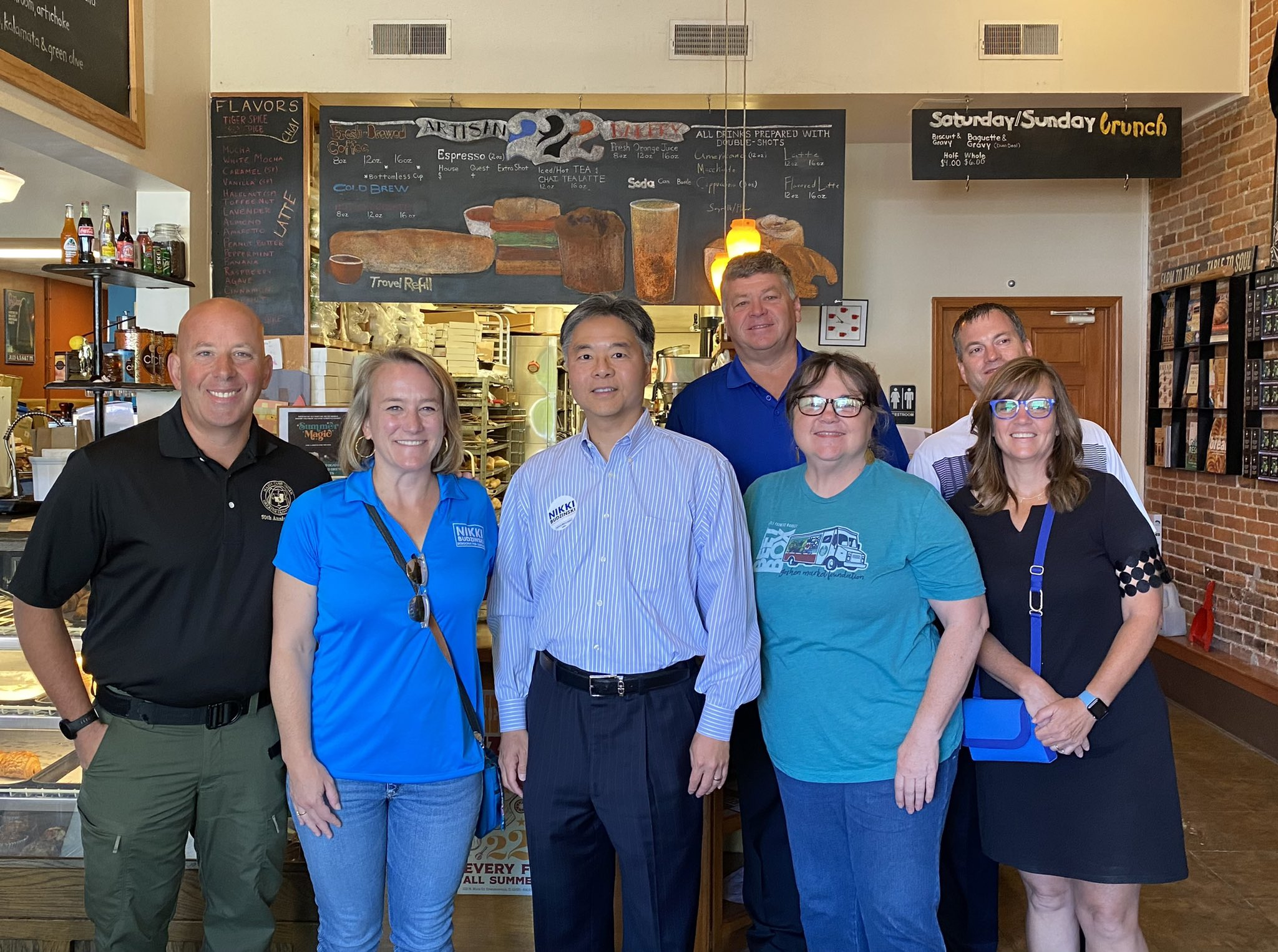
Budzinski (second from left) with U.S. Representative Ted Lieu (third from left) in June 2022.

==== 2022 ====
On August 24, 2021, Budzinski announced her bid for the Democratic nomination for Illinois's 13th congressional district. The district had been significantly redrawn to favor Democrats; it now included the core of the Metro East. She won the primary in June 2022 against David Palmer and the general election in November against the Republican nominee, Regan Deering.

==== 2024 ====
Budzinski was reelected in 2024, defeating Republican Joshua Loyd with 58.1% of the vote to Loyd's 41.9%. She ran ahead of the top of the Democratic ticket in the district.

=== 2026 ===
In the March 2026 Democratic primary, Budzinski defeated progressive challenger Dylan Blaha who tried to run to her left. She received 75.1% of the vote in the primary. Election forecasters have rated the race as a safe Democratic seat.

=== Tenure ===
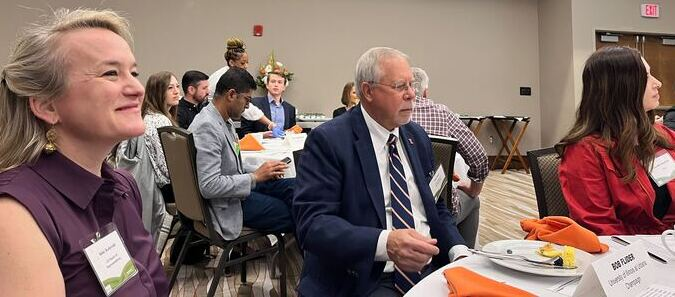
Budzinski with former Director of the Illinois Department of Agriculture Robert Flider in 2023

Budzinski is the Vice Chair for Policy for the moderate New Democrat Coalition. She helped roll out the coalition's "Affordability Agenda," a policy package aimed at the rising cost of health care, housing, energy, and groceries. Budzinski serves on the House Committees on Agriculture and Veterans' Affairs, where she is the ranking member of the Subcommittee on Technology Modernization. In that role, she has conducted oversight on the Department of Veterans Affairs' electronic health record modernization program and its contractor, Oracle, holding her first subcommittee hearing on the effort in February 2025.

=== Committee assignments ===
For the 119th Congress:

- Committee on Agriculture
  - Subcommittee on Commodity Markets, Digital Assets, and Rural Developments
  - Subcommittee on Conservation, Research, and Biotechnology
  - Subcommittee on General Farm Commodities, Risk Management, and Credit
- Committee on Veterans' Affairs
  - Subcommittee on Technology Modernization (Ranking Member)

=== Caucus memberships ===
- Black Maternal Health Caucus
- Congressional Caucus for the Equal Rights Amendment
- Congressional Equality Caucus
- Future Forum
- New Democrat Coalition

== Political positions ==
A member of the moderate New Democrat Coalition, Budzinski has been described as a centrist.

=== Abortion ===
Budzinski supports abortion rights. During her 2022 campaign she backed codifying Roe v. Wade into federal law and repealing the Hyde Amendment. She was an intern at Planned Parenthood and was endorsed by the organization's political arm.

=== Agriculture ===
As a member of the House Agriculture Committee representing a district with a significant farmland presence, Budzinski has called for a stronger crop insurance program and farm safety net. She has also opposed cuts to nutrition programs like SNAP in farm bill negotiations. She reintroduced bipartisan legislation to permit year-round nationwide sales of E15 gasoline, which includes ethanol in its mixture.

=== Health care ===
Budzinski is against Medicare for All and opposes a single-payer healthcare system. She has expressed her concerns about a single-payer system by saying that she fears a government-run program could be "held hostage to the political whims of any one White House." She also believes that "more competition in the healthcare system actually makes for a better healthcare system" and "will also bring down costs." She co-sponsored the Pharmacists Fight Back Act, introduced in December 2025, which would bar large pharmacy benefit managers from inflating drug prices and sterering patients to affiliated pharmacies. During the 2025 government shutdown, she called renewing the Affordable Care Act's marketplace tax credits "a red line" and opposed Republican cuts to Medicaid.

=== Immigration ===
In January 2025, Budzinski was one of 48 Democrats who voted for the Laken Riley Act, which mandated the detention, without bond, of undocumented immigrants who are accused of crimes. On the question of whether Immigration and Customs Enforcement (ICE) should be reformed or abolished, in August 2026 she said "The training — there is no training for these officers", and believes there should be "system-wide reform" of the agency, "but it doesn’t change, whatever you want to call it, we need immigration enforcement in this country."

=== Israel and Palestine ===
In 2023 Budzinski co-sponsored a resolution to reaffirm U.S. support for Israel following the October 7 attacks. She has voted in favor of military aid to Israel throughout the Gaza war, and although she has expressed concern about humanitarian conditions in Gaza and supported ceasefire efforts, she has vocally supported Israel's "right to self defense", saying "I do believe that Israel has a right to defend itself, and I do support that. They are the only democracy within the Middle East". She has received criticism for accepting money from the Israel lobby, including AIPAC. In July 2026, Budzinski was one of 98 Democrats who voted against an amendment introduced by Thomas Massie which would have eliminated $3.3 billion in aid to Israel.

=== Labor ===
Budzinski supports organized labor and is a former national political director for the UFCW. Budzinski received endorsements from "an array of labor unions" during her first campaign for Congress because of her background, and was the keynote speaker at an AFL-CIO Workers Memorial Day ceremony in Decatur in 2022. In 2025, she intervened in a HUD housing project in her district after being alerted to safety issues by the local SEIU chapter's membership.

She is an original cosponsor of the PRO Act and of the Faster Labor Contracts Act, which sets deadlines for negotiating first union contracts and passed the House in June 2026. She also reintroduced the Public Safety Employer-Employee Cooperation Act, which would guarantee collective-bargaining rights for first responders.

== Electoral history ==
2022 Democratic primary results
Party	Candidate	Votes	%
Democratic	Nikki Budzinski	31,593	75.6
Democratic	David Palmer	10,216	24.4
Total votes		41,809	100.0

2022 Illinois's 13th congressional district election
Party	Candidate	Votes	%
Democratic	Nikki Budzinski	141,788	56.6
Republican	Regan Deering	108,646	43.4
Write-in		16	0.0
Total votes		250,450	100.0
Democratic win (new seat)			

2024 Illinois's 13th congressional district election
Party	Candidate	Votes	%
Democratic	Nikki Budzinski (incumbent)	191,339	58.1
Republican	Joshua Loyd	137,917	41.9
Green	Chibuihe Asonye (write-in)	244	0.1
Total votes		329,500	100.0
Democratic hold			

2026 Democratic primary results
Party	Candidate	Votes	%
Democratic	Nikki Budzinski	44,763	75.09
Democratic	Dylan Blaha	14,850	24.91
Total votes		59,613	100.0

U.S. House of Representatives
Preceded by Rodney Davis	Member of the U.S. House of Representatives from Illinois's 13th congressional district 2023–present	Incumbent
U.S. order of precedence (ceremonial)
Preceded by Josh Brecheen	United States representatives by seniority 295th	Succeeded by Eric Burlison
