= United States House Committee on Veterans' Affairs =

Standing committee of the United States House of Representatives

House Veterans' Affairs Committee
Standing committee
- Active United States House of Representatives; 119th Congress

History
- Formed: January 3, 1947

Leadership
- Chair: Mike Bost (R); Since January 3, 2023
- Ranking Member: Mark Takano (D); Since January 3, 2023

Structure
- Seats: 25 (25 currently filled) 14/14 11/11
- Political parties: Majority (14): Republican (14); Minority (11): Democratic (11)

Jurisdiction
- Oversight authority: Department of Veterans Affairs
- Senate counterpart: Senate Veterans' Affairs Committee

Subcommittees
- Health; Oversight and Investigations; Disability Assistance and Memorial Affairs; Economic Opportunity; Technology Modernization

Meeting place
- 364, Cannon House Office Building; Washington, D.C. 20515

Website
- veterans.house.gov (Republican) democrats-veterans.house.gov (Democratic)

Phone number
- (202)-225-3527

The standing Committee on Veterans' Affairs in the United States House of Representatives oversees agencies, reviews current legislation, and recommends new bills or amendments concerning U.S. military veterans. Jurisdiction includes retiring and disability pensions, life insurance, education (including the G.I. Bill), vocational training, medical care, and home loan guarantees. The committee oversees the Department of Veterans Affairs (VA), veterans' hospitals, and veterans' cemeteries, except cemeteries under the Secretary of the Interior.

The Veterans' Affairs Committee does not have legislative jurisdiction over the following issues:

- Tax status of veterans benefits and contributions to Veterans Service Organizations (Committee on Ways and Means);
- Military retiree issues, including COLA's and disability pay (Committee on Armed Services);
- CHAMPUS and Tri-Care (Committee on Armed Services);
- Survivor Benefit Program (Committee on Armed Services);
- Veterans Preference in Federal civil service hiring practice (Committee on Government Reform and Oversight);
- Congressional charters for veterans service organizations (Committee on Judiciary);
- Immigration issues relating to veterans (Committee on Judiciary); and
- Issues dealing with Prisoners of War (POWs) and service members missing in action (MIAs) (Committee on Armed Services)

The committee was created by Section 121(a) of the Legislative Reorganization Act of 1946 (Public Law 79-601), which authorized a standing committee of 27 members.

== Members, 119th Congress ==
Majority	Minority
Mike Bost, Illinois, Chair; Amata Coleman Radewagen, American Samoa, Vice Chair; Jack Bergman, Michigan; Nancy Mace, South Carolina; Mariannette Miller-Meeks, Iowa; Greg Murphy, North Carolina; Derrick Van Orden, Wisconsin; Morgan Luttrell, Texas; Juan Ciscomani, Arizona; Keith Self, Texas; Jen Kiggans, Virginia; Abraham Hamadeh, Arizona; Kimberlyn King-Hinds, Northern Mariana Islands; Tom Barrett, Michigan	Mark Takano, California, Ranking Member; Julia Brownley, California; Chris Pappas, New Hampshire; Sheila Cherfilus-McCormick, Florida (until April 21, 2026); Morgan McGarvey, Kentucky; Delia Ramirez, Illinois; Nikki Budzinski, Illinois; Tim Kennedy, New York; Maxine Dexter, Oregon; Herb Conaway, New Jersey, Vice Ranking Member; Kelly Morrison, Minnesota; Maggie Goodlander, New Hampshire (from June 9, 2026)

Resolutions electing members: H.Res. 13 (Chair), H.Res. 14 (Ranking Member), H.Res. 31 (R), H.Res. 40 (D), H.Res. 1352 (Goodlander)

According to committee members' official online biographies, eleven (Barrett, Bergman, Bost, Conaway, Goodlander, Hamadeh, Kiggans, Luttrell, Miller-Meeks, Self, and Van Orden) of the twenty-seven members are veterans.

== Subcommittees ==
Subcommittee	Chair	Ranking Member
Disability Assistance and Memorial Affairs	Morgan Luttrell (R-TX)	Morgan McGarvey (D-KY)
Economic Opportunity	Derrick Van Orden (R-WI)	Chris Pappas (D-NH)
Health	Mariannette Miller-Meeks (R-IA)	Julia Brownley (D-CA)
Oversight and Investigations	Jen Kiggans (R-VA)	Delia Ramirez (D-IL)
Technology Modernization	Tom Barrett (R-MI)	Nikki Budzinski (D-IL)

== Leadership ==
Chairs of the House Veterans' Affairs Committee and its predecessors are listed below.

=== Committee on Claims (1794–1880) ===
- Uriah Tracy (F), CT 1794–1796
- Dwight Foster (F), MA 1796–1800
- Nathaniel Macon (D), NC 1800–1801
- John Smith (F), CT 1801–1806
- David Holmes (NP), VA 1806–1809
- Richard Johnson (D), KY 1809–1810
- Erastus Root (D), NY 1810–1811
- Burwell Bassett (D), VA 1811–1812
- Thomas Gholson (D), VA 1812–1813
- Stevenson Archer (D), MD 1813–1814
- Bartlett Yancey (NP), NC 1814–1816
- Lewis Williams (NP), NC 1816–1828
- William McCoy (D), VA 1828–1829
- Elisha Whittlesey (NP), OH 1829–1838
- John Chambers (W), KY 1838–1839
- David Russell (W), NY 1839–1840
- Joshua Giddings (ASW), OH 1840–1843
- Joseph Vance (W), OH 1843–1846
- John R. J. Daniel (D), NC 1846–1847
- John A. Rockwell (W), CT 1847–1849
- John R. J. Daniel (D), NC 1849–1853
- Alfred Edgerton (D), OH 1853–1855
- Joshua Giddings (ASW), OH 1855–1857
- Samuel S. Marshall (D), IL 1857–1859
- Mason Tappan (R), NH 1859–1861
- Reuben Fenton (R), NY 1861-1863
- James Hale (R), PA 1863–1864
- Columbus Delano (R), OH 1864–1867
- John Bingham (R), OH 1867–1869
- William B. Washburn (R), MA 1869–1871
- Austin Blair (R), MI 1871–1873
- John B. Hawley (R), IL 1873–1875
- John M. Bright (D), TN 1875–1880

=== Committee on Pensions and Revolutionary Claims (1813–1826) ===
- Samuel D. Ingham (Je. D), PA 1813–1814
- John Chappell (SRWD), SC 1814–1816
- John Rhea (D), TN 1816–1823
- Peter Little (D), MD 1823–1826

=== Committee on Revolutionary Pensions (1825) ===
Name	Party	State	Start	End
Joseph Hemphill	Jacksonian	Pennsylvania	1825	

=== Committee on Military Pensions (1825–1831) ===
Name	Party	State	Start	End
Tristam Burges	National Republican	Rhode Island	1825	1828
James Mitchell	Jacksonian	Tennessee	1828	1829
Isaac Bates	National Republican	Massachusetts	1829	1830
James Trezvant	Jacksonian	Virginia	1830	1831

=== Committee on Revolutionary Claims (1825–1974) ===
- Robert Allen (D), TN 1825–1827
- George Wolf (D), PA 1827–1829
- Henry Muhlenberg (JD), PA 1829–1838
- Robert Craig (D), VA 1838–1840
- Joseph Randolph (W), NJ 1840–1841
- Hiland Hall (W), VT 1841–1843
- Richard D. Davis (D), NY 1843–1845
- Joseph Johnson (D), VA 1845–1847
- Daniel P. King (W), MA 1847–1849
- Cullen Sawtelle (D), ME 1849–1851
- Moses Macdonald (D), ME 1851–1853
- Rufus Peckham (D), NY 1853–1855
- David Ritchie (R), PA 1855–1857
- Samuel S. Cox (D), OH 1857–1859
- George Briggs (AP), NY 1859–1861
- R. Holland Duell (R), NY 1861–1863
- Hiram Price (R), IA 1863–1865
- Kellian Whaley (R), WV 1865–1867
- Hamilton Ward (R), NY 1867–1869
- Sempronius H. Boyd (R), MO 1868–1871
- Alexander S. Wallace (R), SC 1871–1873

=== Committee on Invalid Pensions (1831–1946) ===
- Tristam Burges (NP), RI 1831–1835
- Jesse Miller (D), PA 1835–1836
- James M. H. Beale (D), VA 1836–1837
- William Taylor (D), NY 1837–1839
- Sherrod Williams (W), KY 1839–1841
- Calvary Morris (W), OH 1841–1843
- Jacob Brinkerhoff (D), OH 1843–1846
- Preston King (D), NY 1846–1847
- Henry Nes (I), PA 1848–1849
- Andrew S. Fulton (W), VA 1849–1850
- Shepherd Leffler (D), IA 1850–1852
- Isham G. Harris (D), TN 1852–1853
- Thomas A. Hendricks (D), IN 1853–1855
- Andrew Oliver (D), NY 1855–1857
- Joshua Jewett (D), KY 1857–1859
- Reuben Fenton (R), NY 1859–1861
- Alfred Ely (R), NY 1861–1863
- Kellian Whaley (R), WV 1863–1864
- Sidney Perham (R), ME 1864–1869
- John F. Benjamin (RR), MO 1869–1871
- Jesse H. Moore (R), IL 1871–1873
- Jeremiah M. Rusk (R), WI 1873–1875
- George A. Jenks (D), PA 1875–1877
- Americus V. Rice (D), OH 1877–1879
- Alexander H. Coffroth (D), PA 1879–1880
- Thomas M. Browne (R), IN 1880–1882
- Courtland C. Matson (D), IN 1883–1889
- Edmund N. Morrill (R), KS 1889–1891
- Augustus N. Martin (D) IN 1891–1895
- John Pickler (R), SD 1895–1896
- George W. Ray (R), NY 1896–1899
- Cyrus A. Sulloway (R), NH 1899–1911
- Isaac R. Sherwood (D), OH 1911–1919
- Charles Fuller (R), IL 1919–1925
- Richard N. Elliott (R), IN 1925–1926
- William I. Swoope (R), PA 1926–1927
- William T. Fitzgerald (R), OH 1927–1929
- John M. Nelson (R), WI 1929–1931
- Mell G. Underwood (D), OH 1931–1936
- John Lesinski (D), MI 1937–1945
- Augustine B. Kelley (D), PA 1946

=== Committee on Revolutionary Pensions (1831–1880) ===
- Henry Hubbard (D), NH 1831–1833
- Daniel Wardwell (R), NY 1833–1837
- William S. Morgan (D), VA 1837–1839
- John Taliaferro (W), VA 1839–1843
- George O. Rathbun (D), NY 1843–1844
- David L. Seymour (D), NY 1844–1845
- Richard Brodhead (D), PA 1845–1847
- William Cocke (D), TN 1847–1849
- Loren P. Waldo (D), CT 1849–1851
- John Millson (D), VA 1851–1853
- William M. Churchwell (D), TN 1853–1855
- Jacob Broom (AW), PA 1855–1856
- John Hickman (R), PA 1856–1860
- John F. Potter (R), WI 1860–1861
- Charles Van Wyck (R), NY 1861–1863
- DeWitt Littlejohn (R), NY 1863–1865
- Walter D. McIndoe (R), WI 1865–1867
- Benjamin F. Loan (Rad), MO 1867–1869
- John T. Deweese (D), NC 1969
- Charles W. Willard (R), VT 1869–1873
- Lazarus D. Shoemaker (R), PA 1873–1875
- Eppa Hunton (D), VA 1875–1877
- Levi A. Mackey (D), PA 1877–1879
- John Whiteaker (D), OR 1879–1880

=== Committee on War Claims (1873–1946) ===
- William Lawrence (R), OH 1873–1875
- John R. Eden (D), IL 1875–1879
- Edward S. Bragg (D), WI 1879–1881
- Leonidas C. Houk (R), TN 1881–1883
- George W. Geddes (D), OH 1883–1887
- William J. Stone (D), KY 1887–1889
- Ormsby B. Thomas (R), WI 1889–1891
- Frank E. Beltzhoover (D), PA 1891–1895
- Thaddeus M. Mahon (R), PA 1895–1907
- Kittredge Haskins (R), VT 1907–1909
- Charles B. Law (R), NY 1909–1911
- Thetus W. Sims (D), TN 1911–1913
- Alexander W. Gregg (D), TX 1913–1919
- Benjamin K. Focht (R), PA 1919–1921
- Bertrand Snell (R), NY 1921–1923
- James G. Strong (R), KS 1923–1930
- Miles C. Allgood (D), AL 1931–1934
- Wilburn Cartwright (D), OK 1935
- John H. Hoeppel (D), CA 1936
- Joseph A. Gavagan (D), NY 1937
- Alfred F. Beiter (D), NY 1938
- Reuben T. Wood (D), MO 1939–1941
- Joseph A. Gavagan (D), NY 1941–1944
- Edward J. Hart (D), NJ 1944
- Clair Engle (D), CA 1945–1946

=== Committee on Pensions (1880–1946) ===
Name	Party	State	Start	End
John Whiteaker	Democratic	Oregon	1880	1881
Benjamin Marsh	Republican	Illinois	1881	1883
Goldsmith Hewitt	Democratic	Alabama	1883	1885
Nathaniel Eldredge	Democratic	Michigan	1885	1887
Archibald Bliss	Democratic	New York	1887	1889
Milton De Lano	Republican	New York	1889	1891
Robert Wilson	Democratic	Missouri	1891	1894
Charles Moses	Democratic	Georgia	1894	1895
Henry Loudenslager	Republican	New Jersey	1895	1911
William Richardson	Democratic	Alabama	1911	1914
John Key	Democratic	Ohio	1914	1919
Sam Sells	Republican	Tennessee	1919	1921
Harold Knutson	Republican	Minnesota	1921	1930
William Kopp	Republican	Iowa	1930	
Allard Gasque	Democratic	South Carolina	1931	1938
Martin Smith	Democratic	Washington	1939	1942
Charles Buckley	Democratic	New York	1943	1946

=== Committee on World War Veterans Legislation (1924–1946) ===
Name	Party	State	Start	End
Royal Johnson	Republican	South Dakota	1924	1931
John Rankin	Democratic	Mississippi	1931	1946

=== Committee on Veterans' Affairs (1947–present) ===
Chairs
Name	Party	State	Start	End
Edith Rogers	Republican	Massachusetts	1947	1949
John Rankin	Democratic	Mississippi	1949	1953
Edith Rogers	Republican	Massachusetts	1953	1955
Olin Teague	Democratic	Texas	1955	1973
William Dorn	Democratic	South Carolina	1973	1975
Ray Roberts	Democratic	Texas	1975	1981
Gillespie Montgomery	Democratic	Mississippi	1981	1995
Bob Stump	Republican	Arizona	1995	2001
Chris Smith	Republican	New Jersey	2001	2005
Steve Buyer	Republican	Indiana	2005	2007
Bob Filner	Democratic	California	2007	2011
Jeff Miller	Republican	California	2011	2017
Phil Roe	Republican	Tennessee	2017	2019
Mark Takano	Democratic	California	2019	2023
Mike Bost	Republican	Illinois	2023	present

Ranking members
Name	Party	State	Start	End
John Rankin	Democratic	Mississippi	1947	1949
Edith Rogers	Republican	Massachusetts	1949	1953
Olin Teague	Democratic	Texas	1953	1955
Edith Rogers	Republican	Massachusetts	1955	1960
William Ayres	Republican	Ohio	1961	1965
Ross Adair	Republican	Indiana	1965	1969
Charles Teague	Republican	California	1969	1973
John Hammerschmidt	Republican	Arkansas	1973	1987
Gerald Solomon	Republican	New York	1987	1989
Bob Stump	Republican	Arizona	1989	1995
Sonny Montgomery	Democratic	Mississippi	1995	1997
Lane Evans	Democratic	Illinois	1997	2007
Steve Buyer	Republican	Indiana	2007	2011
Bob Filner	Democratic	California	2011	2012
Mike Michaud	Democratic	Maine	2012	2015
Corrine Brown	Democratic	Florida	2015	2016
Mark Takano; Acting	Democratic	California	2016	2017
Tim Walz	Democratic	Minnesota	2017	2019
Phil Roe	Republican	Tennessee	2019	2021
Mike Bost	Republican	Illinois	2021	2023
Mark Takano	Democratic	California	2023	present

== Past committee rosters ==
=== 118th Congress ===
Majority	Minority
Mike Bost, Illinois, Chair; Amata Coleman Radewagen, American Samoa; Jack Bergman, Michigan; Nancy Mace, South Carolina; Matt Rosendale, Montana; Mariannette Miller-Meeks, Iowa; Greg Murphy, North Carolina; Scott Franklin, Florida; Derrick Van Orden, Wisconsin; Morgan Luttrell, Texas; Juan Ciscomani, Arizona; Eli Crane, Arizona; Keith Self, Texas; Jen Kiggans, Virginia	Mark Takano, California, Ranking Member; Julia Brownley, California; Mike Levin, California; Chris Pappas, New Hampshire; Frank J. Mrvan, Indiana; Sheila Cherfilus-McCormick, Florida; Chris Deluzio, Pennsylvania, Vice Ranking Member; Morgan McGarvey, Kentucky; Delia Ramirez, Illinois; Greg Landsman, Ohio; Nikki Budzinski, Illinois

Resolutions electing members: H.Res. 14 (Chair), H.Res. 15 (Ranking Member), H.Res. 79 (D), H.Res. 80 (R)

According to committee members' official online biographies, seven (Bergman, Brown, Ellzey, Luria, Miller-Meeks, Nehls and Sablan) of the thirty-one members are veterans.

Subcommittees

Subcommittee	Chair	Ranking Member
Disability Assistance and Memorial Affairs	Morgan Luttrell (R-TX)	Chris Pappas (D-NH)
Economic Opportunity	Derrick Van Orden (R-WI)	Mike Levin (D-CA)
Health	Mariannette Miller-Meeks (R-IA)	Julia Brownley (D-CA)
Oversight and Investigations	Jen Kiggans (R-VA)	Frank J. Mrvan (D-IN)
Technology Modernization	Matt Rosendale (R-MT)	Sheila Cherfilus-McCormick (D-FL)

=== 117th Congress ===
Majority	Minority
Mark Takano, California, Chair; Julia Brownley, California; Conor Lamb, Pennsylvania; Mike Levin, California, Vice Chair; Chris Pappas, New Hampshire; Elaine Luria, Virginia; Frank J. Mrvan, Indiana; Sheila Cherfilus-McCormick, Florida (since February 2, 2022); Gregorio Sablan, Northern Mariana Islands; Lauren Underwood, Illinois; Colin Allred, Texas; Lois Frankel, Florida; Anthony Brown, Maryland; Elissa Slotkin, Michigan; David Trone, Maryland; Raul Ruiz, California; Ruben Gallego, Arizona	Mike Bost, Illinois, Ranking Member; Amata Coleman Radewagen, American Samoa; Jack Bergman, Michigan; Jim Banks, Indiana; Chip Roy, Texas; Greg Murphy, North Carolina; Tracey Mann, Kansas; Barry Moore, Alabama; Nancy Mace, South Carolina; Madison Cawthorn, North Carolina; Troy Nehls, Texas; Matt Rosendale, Montana; Mariannette Miller-Meeks, Iowa; Jake Ellzey, Texas (since August 24, 2021); Connie Conway, California

Resolutions electing members: H.Res. 9 (Chair), H.Res. 10 (Ranking Member), H.Res. 62 (D), H.Res. 63 (R), H.Res. 92 (D), H.Res. 111 (D), H.Res. 602 (R), H.Res. 902 (D), H.Res. 1197 (R)

According to committee members' official online biographies, ten (Banks, Bergman, Brown, Ellzey, Gallego, Lamb, Luria, Miller-Meeks, Nehls and Sablan) of the thirty-one members are veterans.

Subcommittees

Subcommittee	Chair	Ranking Member
Disability Assistance and Memorial Affairs	Elaine Luria (D-VA)	Troy Nehls (R-TX)
Economic Opportunity	Mike Levin (D-CA)	Barry Moore (R-AL)
Health	Julia Brownley (D-CA)	Jack Bergman (R-MI)
Oversight and Investigations	Chris Pappas (D-NH)	Tracey Mann (R-KS)
Technology Modernization	Frank J. Mrvan (D-IN)	Matt Rosendale (R-MT)

=== 116th Congress ===
Majority	Minority
Mark Takano, California, Chair; Julia Brownley, California; Kathleen Rice, New York; Conor Lamb, Pennsylvania, Vice Chair; Mike Levin, California; Max Rose, New York; Chris Pappas, New Hampshire; Elaine Luria, Virginia; Susie Lee, Nevada; Joe Cunningham, South Carolina; Gil Cisneros, California; Collin Peterson, Minnesota; Gregorio Sablan, Northern Mariana Islands; Colin Allred, Texas; Lauren Underwood, Illinois; Anthony Brindisi, New York (since November 19, 2019)	Phil Roe, Tennessee, Ranking Member; Gus Bilirakis, Florida; Amata Coleman Radewagen, American Samoa, Vice Ranking Member; Mike Bost, Illinois; Neal Dunn, Florida; Jack Bergman, Michigan; Jim Banks, Indiana; Andy Barr, Kentucky; Dan Meuser, Pennsylvania; Steve Watkins, Kansas; Chip Roy, Texas; Greg Steube, Florida

Sources: H.Res. 24 (Chair), H.Res. 25 (Ranking Member), H.Res. 57 (D), H.Res. 68 (R), H.Res. 148 (D), H.Res. 712 (D)

According to committee members' official online biographies, thirteen (Banks, Bergman, Bost, Cisneros, Dunn, Lamb, Luria, Peterson, Roe, Rose, Sablan, Steube, Watkins) of the twenty-eight members are veterans.

Subcommittees

Subcommittee	Chair	Ranking Member
Disability Assistance and Memorial Affairs	Elaine Luria (D-VA)	Mike Bost (R-IL)
Economic Opportunity	Mike Levin (D-CA)	Gus Bilirakis (R-FL)
Health	Julia Brownley (D-CA)	Neal Dunn (R-FL)
Oversight and Investigations	Chris Pappas (D-NH)	Jack Bergman (R-MI)
Technology Modernization	Susie Lee (D-NV)	Jim Banks (R-IN)

=== 115th Congress ===
Majority	Minority
Phil Roe, Tennessee, Chair; Gus Bilirakis, Florida, Vice Chair; Mike Coffman, Colorado; Brad Wenstrup, Ohio; Amata Coleman Radewagen, American Samoa; Mike Bost, Illinois; Bruce Poliquin, Maine; Neal Dunn, Florida; Jodey Arrington, Texas; John Rutherford, Florida; Clay Higgins, Louisiana; Jack Bergman, Michigan; Jim Banks, Indiana; Jenniffer González, Puerto Rico	Tim Walz, Minnesota, Ranking Member; Mark Takano, California, Vice Ranking Member; Julia Brownley, California; Ann McLane Kuster, New Hampshire; Beto O'Rourke, Texas; Kathleen Rice, New York; Lou Correa, California; Conor Lamb, Pennsylvania (from April 17, 2018); Gregorio Sablan, Northern Marianas Islands; Elizabeth Esty, Connecticut; Scott Peters, California

Sources: H.Res. 6 (Chair), H.Res. 45 (D), H.Res. 51 (R), H.Res. 52 (D), H.Res. 833 (D)

According to committee members' official online biographies, eleven (Banks, Bergman, Bost, Coffman, Dunn, Higgins, Lamb, Roe, Sablan, Walz, Wenstrup) of the twenty-five members are veterans.

=== 114th Congress ===
Majority	Minority
Jeff Miller, Florida, Chair; Doug Lamborn, Colorado; Gus Bilirakis, Florida, Vice Chair; Phil Roe, Tennessee; Dan Benishek, Michigan; Tim Huelskamp, Kansas; Mike Coffman, Colorado; Brad Wenstrup, Ohio; Jackie Walorski, Indiana; Ralph Abraham, Louisiana; Lee Zeldin, New York; Ryan Costello, Pennsylvania; Amata Coleman Radewagen, American Samoa; Mike Bost, Illinois	Mark Takano, California, Ranking Member; Corrine Brown, Florida; Julia Brownley, California; Dina Titus, Nevada; Raul Ruiz, California; Ann McLane Kuster, New Hampshire; Beto O'Rourke, Texas; Kathleen Rice, New York; Tim Walz, Minnesota; Jerry McNerney, California

Resolutions electing Republican members: H.Res. 6 (Chairs)
Resolutions electing Democratic members: H.Res. 7, H.Res. 30, H.Res. 40 and H.Res. 77

== See also ==
- United States Senate Committee on Veterans' Affairs
- United States Department of Veterans Affairs
- List of United States House of Representatives committees
