= Juan Ciscomani =

American politician (born 1982)

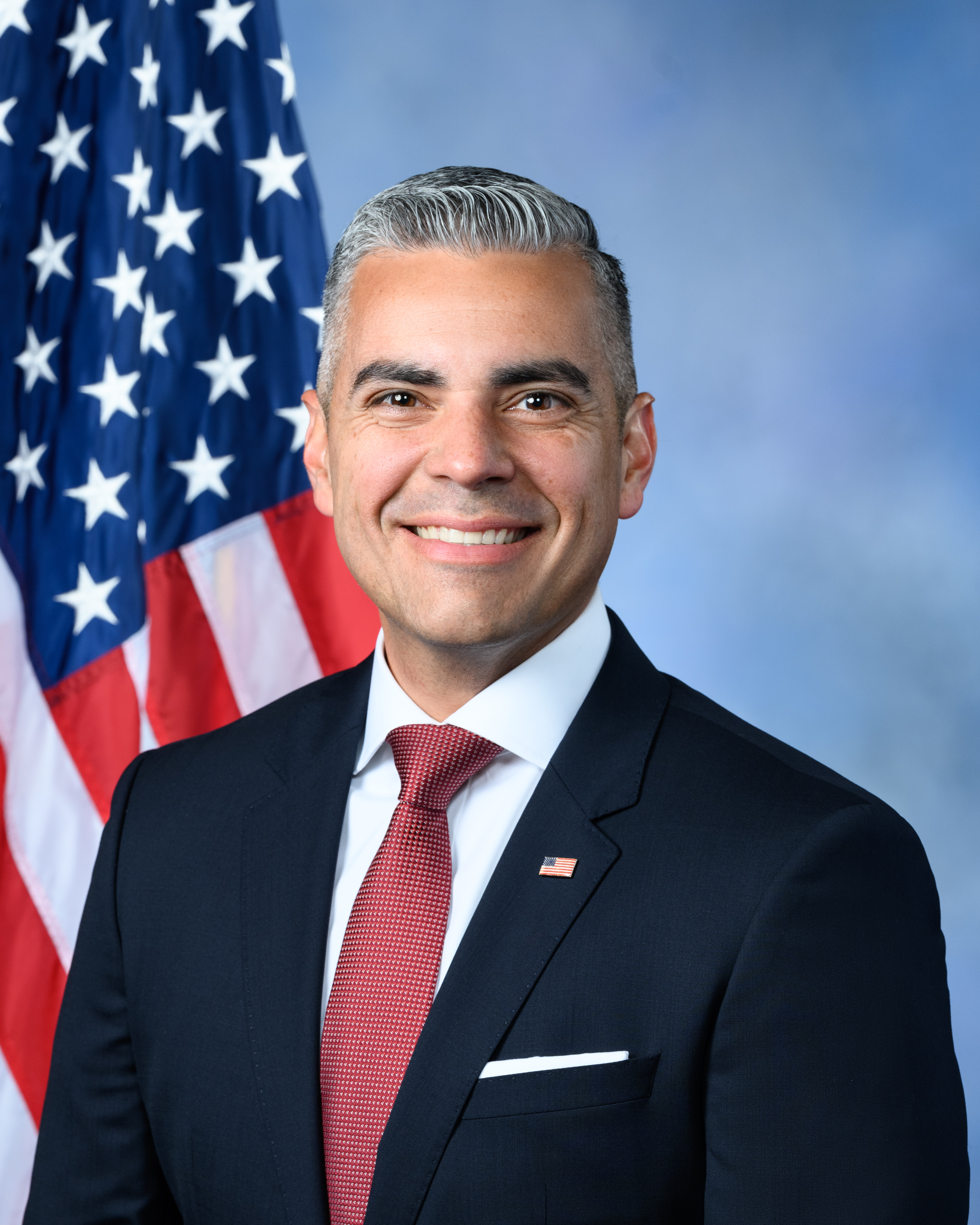
- Official portrait, 2022

Member of the U.S. House of Representatives from Arizona's 6th district
- Incumbent
- Assumed office January 3, 2023
- Preceded by: Ann Kirkpatrick (redistricted)

Personal details
- Born: August 31, 1982 (age 44) Hermosillo, Sonora, Mexico
- Party: Republican
- Spouse: Laura Ciscomani
- Children: 6
- Education: Pima Community College (attended); University of Arizona (BA)
- Website: House website Campaign website
- Ciscomani's voice Ciscomani commemorates National Hispanic Heritage Month and Citizenship Day. Recorded September 19, 2024

Juan Ciscomani III (/ˌsɪskoʊˈmɑːni/ SIS-koh-MAH-nee; born August 31, 1982) is an American politician serving as the U.S. representative for Arizona's 6th congressional district since 2023. A Republican, he was a senior adviser to former Governor Doug Ducey and vice chair of the Arizona-Mexico Commission. Ciscomani was chosen to deliver the Republican response to the 2023 State of the Union Address in Spanish. Ciscomani lost his seat in 2026 to former marine JoAnna Mendoza.

== Early life and education ==
Ciscomani was born in Hermosillo, Sonora, Mexico and was raised in Tucson, Arizona. He attended Pima Community College and the University of Arizona, becoming the first member of his family to graduate from college. After graduating, he worked at the University of Arizona as a program development specialist.

== Early political career ==
In 2003, Ciscomani interned for U.S. Representative Ed Pastor, a Democrat from Arizona. He then completed a fellowship with Loretta Sanchez, another Democratic member of the U.S. House. Ciscomani has said that working for Democrats "challenged my own thinking and then really solidified where I stood politically."

Ciscomani ran unsuccessfully for the Arizona Legislature in 2008. He is a member of the Tucson Hispanic Chamber of Commerce and has served as its vice president of outreach. He has also served on the Arizona Civil Rights Advisory Board and the Pima County Commission on Trial Court Appointments.

=== Gubernatorial advisor ===
In 2015, Ciscomani joined Governor Ducey's office as a senior advisor and vice chair of the Arizona-Mexico Commission, a post that he held until 2021.

== U.S. House of Representatives ==
=== Elections ===
==== 2022 ====
In the 2022 elections, Ciscomani ran for a seat in the U.S. House of Representatives as a Republican to represent Arizona's 6th congressional district. He narrowly defeated the Democratic nominee, state Senator Kirsten Engel, in the general election.

==== 2024 ====
Ciscomani ran for a second term in Congress. He faced Democratic nominee Kirsten Engel in a rematch that pundits expected to be one of the most competitive races in the country. Ciscomani defeated Engel in the November 2024 general election.

=== Tenure ===
During the 2023 Speaker of the House election, Ciscomani nominated Kevin McCarthy for Speaker. In February 2023, he delivered the Republican response to President Joe Biden's 2023 State of the Union Address in Spanish.

Ciscomani was floated as a potential candidate for United States Senate in 2024, with Politico reporting that "establishment Republicans" were encouraging him to enter the race. He ultimately declined to enter the race. There was some speculation that he may run in the 2026 Arizona gubernatorial election, but he decided to run for re-election to the U.S. House instead.

In February 2025, the U.S. House passed a bill co-sponsored by Ciscomani, the Agent Raul Gonzalez Officer Safety Act. The border security bill enhanced penalties for individuals fleeing law enforcement at high speeds within 100 miles of Mexico or Canada.

In May 2025, Ciscomani was among a group of House Republicans who wrote a letter "to sound the alarm over the Trump administration's plans to downsize the Social Security Administration." The letter said that proposed cuts could "further deteriorate customer service that has been subpar in recent years."

In May 2025, Ciscomani voted for the One Big Beautiful Bill Act.

In May 2026, Ciscomani was part of a bipartisan group of lawmakers who launched a new U.S.-Mexico Caucus aimed at strengthening "trade, security, and cultural cooperation" between the two nations.

=== Committee assignments ===
For the 118th Congress:

- Committee on Appropriations
  - Subcommittee on Financial Services and General Government
  - Subcommittee on Labor, Health and Human Services, Education, and Related Agencies
  - Subcommittee on Transportation, Housing and Urban Development, and Related Agencies
- Committee on Veterans' Affairs
  - Subcommittee on Disability Assistance and Memorial Affairs
  - Subcommittee on Economic Opportunity

=== Caucus memberships ===
Ciscomani's caucus memberships include:

- Republican Governance Group
- Problem Solvers Caucus
- Main Street Caucus
- Conservative Climate Caucus
- Climate Solutions Caucus
- Congressional YIMBY Caucus
- Congressional Western Caucus

== Political positions ==
=== Abortion rights ===
Ciscomani praised the 2022 Supreme Court decision that overturned Roe v. Wade. He has said that he opposes a nationwide ban on abortion but supports Arizona's preexisting ban on abortions after 15 weeks. He criticized a 2024 ruling by the Arizona Supreme Court that implemented a near-total abortion ban in the state by enforcing an 1864 law.

=== Healthcare ===
In 2026, Ciscomani voted to not extend the Affordable Care Act enhanced subsidies. He had previously warned of dire consequences if they expired. In 2024, he declined to say whether he supported the repeal of the Affordable Care Act. In 2025, he said he "cannot, and will not, support any legislation that reduces Medicaid benefits for vulnerable populations the program was intended to serve."

=== Immigration ===
Ciscomani has said that he supports passing border security legislation in the immediate term. According to The Wall Street Journal, he said "he would be open to immigration reform and legal protections for young immigrants who came to the U.S. as children."

=== Foreign policy ===
Ciscomani voted to provide Israel with support following the 2023 Hamas attack on Israel.

Ciscomani supported Trump's initial strikes in the 2026 Iran war, but later said he is opposed to a ground war. In June 2026, he voted against the Iran war powers resolution, that would have limited the war in Iran unless congressional authorization is obtained.

== Personal life ==
Ciscomani resides in Tucson. He and his wife, Laura, have six children. He is Protestant.

== Electoral history ==
Electoral history of Juan Ciscomani
Year	Office	Party	Primary			General			Result	Swing	Ref.
Year	Office	Party	Total	%	P.	Total	%	P.	Result	Swing	Ref.
2008	State representative (Note: In Arizona, each of the state's thirty legislative districts elects two state house representatives from among the top two candidates with the highest vote share.)	Republican	2,142	35.90%	2nd	11,960	15.36%	4th	Lost	Hold	
2022	U.S. representative	Republican	49,559	47.12%	1st	177,201	50.73%	1st	Won	Gain	
2024	U.S. representative	Republican	59,021	59.2%	1st	215,596	50.00%	1st	Won	Hold	

== See also ==
- List of Hispanic and Latino Americans in the United States Congress

U.S. House of Representatives
Preceded by David Schweikert	Member of the U.S. House of Representatives from Arizona's 6th congressional district 2023–present	Incumbent
U.S. order of precedence (ceremonial)
Preceded by Greg Casar	United States representatives by seniority 298th	Succeeded by Mike Collins
