= Keith Self =

American politician (born 1953)

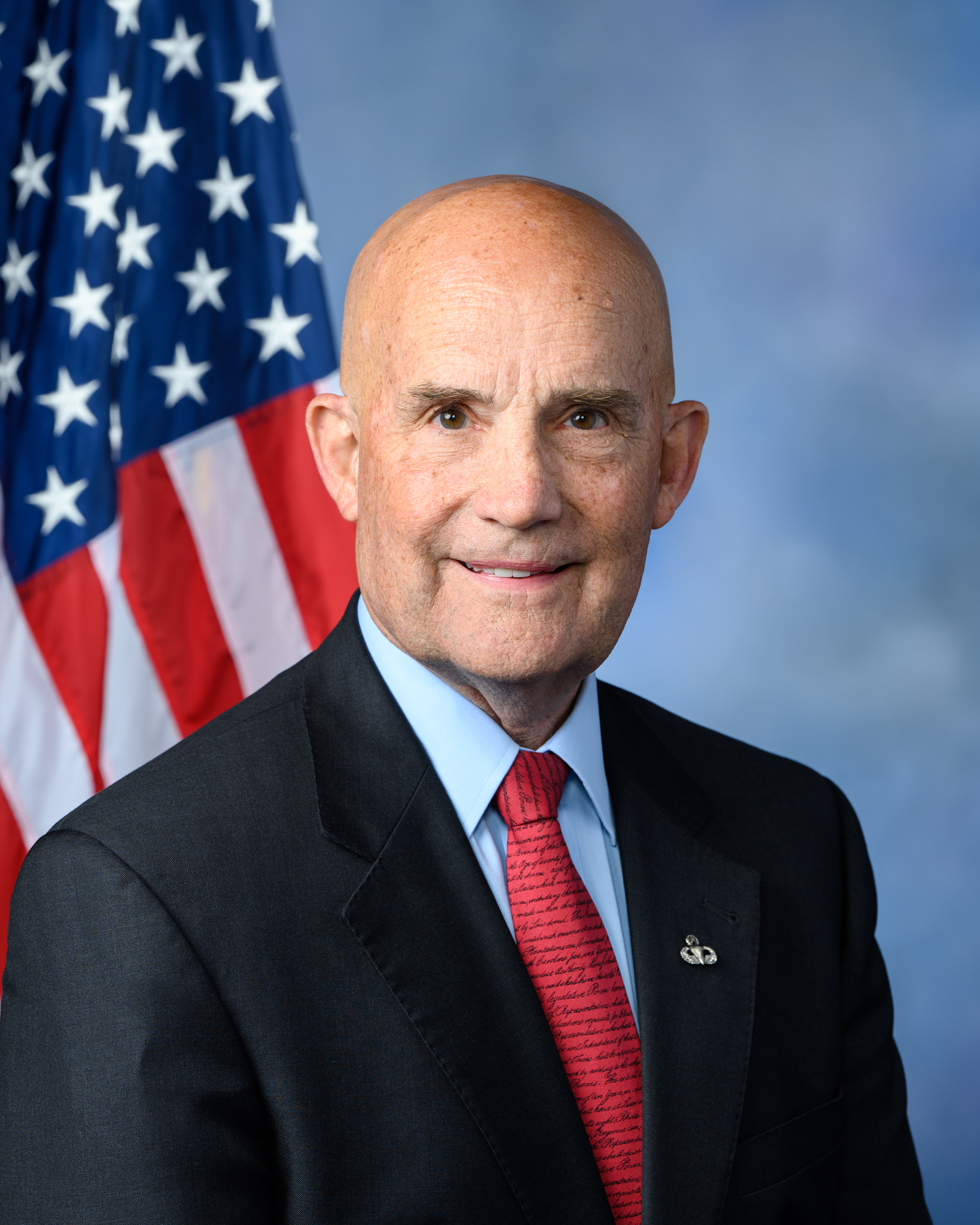
- Official portrait, 2023

Member of the U.S. House of Representatives from Texas's 3rd district
- Incumbent
- Assumed office January 3, 2023
- Preceded by: Van Taylor

Personal details
- Born: Keith Alan Self; March 20, 1953 (age 73) Philadelphia, Pennsylvania, U.S.
- Party: Republican
- Spouse: Tracy Groff (m. 1975)
- Education: United States Military Academy (BS); University of Southern California (MA)
- Website: House website Campaign website

Military service
- Allegiance: United States
- Branch/service: United States Army
- Years of service: 1975–1999
- Rank: Lieutenant Colonel
- Unit: United States Army Rangers

Keith Alan Self (born March 20, 1953) is an American politician, military veteran, and former judge who has been the United States representative for Texas's 3rd congressional district since 2023. He is a member of the Republican Party. From 2007 until 2018, he was the county judge for Collin County.

== Early life and education ==
Self was born in 1953 at a military hospital in Philadelphia and graduated from Tascosa High School in Amarillo, Texas. He earned a Bachelor of Science degree in engineering from the United States Military Academy in 1975. He is married to Tracy Groff.

== Affiliations and religion ==
Self is a life member of the National Rifle Association of America. Self is Protestant.

== Early career ==
Self served in the United States Army from 1975 to 1999. He was a member of the Army Special Forces and Army Rangers. He was deployed to Qatar, Egypt, Germany, Afghanistan, and Belgium. He was a candidate to replace retiring U.S. representative Dick Armey in 2002, narrowly missing the runoff by 93 votes to future representative Michael C. Burgess. He was recalled to active duty from 2002 to 2003, retiring as a lieutenant colonel.

Self was elected as the county judge (Note: A county judge in Texas is equivalent to a county executive in most U.S. states and is so titled because he or she oversees a commissioners' court, although in the less populated counties he or she also presides over the county court that decides matters of law. The judge does not have to be a lawyer.) for Collin County, Texas, serving three terms from 2007 to 2018. He was a candidate for Texas's 3rd congressional district in the March 2022 Republican primary, finishing second to incumbent Van Taylor and advancing to a May runoff. After the primary, Taylor announced that he would end his congressional campaign amid accusations of marital infidelity, giving Self the nomination. Self won the November general election.

== U.S. House of Representatives ==
=== Tenure ===
On January 3, 2023, at the beginning of the 118th Congress, Self voted for Jim Jordan and later for Byron Donalds to be the U.S. House speaker, in a rebuke of House minority leader Kevin McCarthy. "I love the new [U.S. House] rules. I’m looking for somebody that will enforce them", Self said. In the 12th round of voting, Self changed his vote to McCarthy, saying "we are making progress... This will change this House, let’s be very clear". Self was one of 15 Republicans to change their votes. McCarthy finally won the speakership on the 15th vote, held early in the morning on Saturday, January 7, with Self voting in favor.

As a consequence of the delay in selecting a new speaker, Self was formally sworn in as a member of the House of Representatives in the early morning of January 7, 2023, despite the 118th Congress convening on January 3.

=== Committee assignment ===
- Committee on Foreign Affairs
  - Subcommittee on Europe
  - Subcommittee on Western Hemisphere
- Committee on Veteran's Affairs
  - Subcommittee on Disability Assistance and Memorial Affairs
  - Subcommittee on Technology Modernization

=== Caucus membership ===
- Freedom Caucus
- Republican Study Committee
- Sharia-Free America Caucus (co-founder)

=== District priorities ===
During his 2022 midterm election campaign, Self listed his priorities for his district: "Growth challenges such as transportation, proliferation of drag queen shows that target children (I returned a PAC check to a business that sponsored one) and drugs flowing into our area across the border".

=== Goebbels quotes ===
Self has faced public scrutiny for invoking quotes made by the Nazi propagandist Joseph Goebbels. In 2010, while running for the Republican primary for his second term as judge, Self quoted Goebbels, saying "If you tell a lie big enough and keep repeating it, people will eventually come to believe it" while disparaging his opponent, John Muns. Self did not recant his statement, despite concern from his own party for invoking a Nazi, and posted the quote on his website. Some fellow party members, such as Dixie Clem and Jodie Anne Laubenberg dismissed the quote as "just a quote". During a March 2025 congressional hearing, Self, in an attempt to compare the answers of former executive director of the Disinformation Governance Board, Nina Jankowicz, to Goebbels, said "I'll leave you and I'll yield back a little bit of my time, a direct quote from Joseph Goebbels; It is the absolute right of the state to supervise the formation of public opinion and I think that may be what we're discussing here".

=== Misgendering incident ===
During a March 2025 hearing, Self misgendered Sarah McBride, the first openly transgender member of Congress, repeatedly identifying her as "Mr. McBride". McBride responded by misgendering Self saying, "Thank you, Madam Chair". Bill Keating, interrupting McBride, criticized Self, saying, "Have you no decency?" and told Self he would not continue the hearing unless he would refer to McBride by her preferred title. Self subsequently adjourned the hearing.

He later commented in an interview about the incident saying that while McBride "can live however he wants," official congressional proceedings must prioritize "the truth" over what Self described as a "fantasy."

=== 17th Amendment Repeal ===
In June 2026, Self introduced a resolution to repeal the Seventeenth Amendment to the United States Constitution, which provides for the direct election of U.S. senators. The proposed repeal would take away the power of voters to elect senators, instead letting the state legislatures appoint senators. Self, along with eight other co-sponsors, argued that abolishing direct election of senators would restore "constitutional balance and make the Senate more accountable to the people of Texas and every other state in the union."

== Political positions ==
=== 2020 election ===
The Washington Post listed Self as a 2020 presidential election denier.

=== Gun rights ===
On May 6, 2023, a gunman used an AR-15 style rifle in an outlet mall shooting that killed eight and wounded seven in Allen, Texas, within Self's district. In the aftermath of the attack, Self was criticized for characterizing people who say that prayer alone will not stop mass shootings as "people that don't believe in an almighty God, who is absolutely in control of our lives". He followed up by saying that he did not want to discuss politics so soon after a mass shooting; that Allen remains a "very safe area"; and that calls for additional regulation of AR-15 style rifles, including raising the allowable purchasing age, are “a knee-jerk reaction that does not stop criminals.” Self advocated for arming school staff members with guns and having an armed presence in the public, stating that prayer and full funding of mental health programs are a better remedy for mass shootings than gun control. Shannon Watts, the founder of the advocacy group Moms Demand Action, responded: "Faith without works is dead. Prayers without action are empty."

The shooter, Mauricio Martinez Garcia, had enlisted in the U.S. Army in June 2008, but never completed basic training: he was terminated after three months due to mental health concerns. Because this was an administrative separation, rather than a punitive discharge, Garcia's termination by the Army would not show up on the National Instant Criminal Background Check System. On May 11, commenting on Garcia's military service, Self characterized him as "exactly the kind of person we're trying to keep weapons out of the hands of" and said that Garcia's ability to buy guns legally was a loophole that he intends to fix; however, Self denied that he was discussing a red flag law.

=== Fiscal policy ===
Self has said that he considers the growth of U.S. national debt "the existential threat that our nation faces today". Self was among the 71 Republicans who voted against final passage of the Fiscal Responsibility Act of 2023 in the House. On July 3, 2025, Self voted for H.R. 1, One Big Beautiful Bill Act which the Congressional Budget Office estimates will increase deficits by $2.8 trillion over the 2025-2034 period.

=== Islam ===
Self is critical of Islam, posting on X “Islam is tearing the fabric of American values like faith, family, and freedom.” In September 2025, Self shared a post from Laura Loomer, a conservative activist and self-described "proud Islamophobe", accusing Michigan senatorial candidate Abdul El-Sayed of supporting the Muslim Brotherhood, and sharia, or Islamic law. Keith Self and Randy Fine have introduced a bill which would ban sharia from the United States. In November 2025, Self delivered an anti-Islam speech on the floor of the House of Representatives. Self condemned sharia as "a culture of violence and domination, totally anathema to the concept of individual freedom." Self further said “While Western civilization has evolved, Islam has not. Islam is stuck in the 8th century, and if they succeed at imposing their beliefs on us, we will be dragged back into the Dark Age.” In December 2025, Self and Chip Roy announced the "Sharia Free America Caucus". The caucus supports legislation banning "adherents of sharia" from the United States and designating the Muslim Brotherhood as a terrorist organization. Self has said that sharia has "taken over" France and the United Kingdom, and that anti-sharia legislation would protect the United States from this alleged threat. In February 2026, the Council on American–Islamic Relations, a civil rights organization, quoted Self multiple times in a statement designating the Sharia Free America Caucus a hate group. CAIR stated that the agenda of the caucus would "would effectively ban the practice of the world's second largest religion in the United States."

== Electoral history ==
=== 2002 ===
Texas's 26th congressional district Republican primary, 2002
Party	Candidate	Votes	%
Republican	Scott Armey	11,493	45.4
Republican	Michael C. Burgess	5,703	22.5
Republican	Keith Self	5,610	22.2
Republican	Roger Sessions	1,630	6.4
Republican	Dave Kovatch	675	2.7
Republican	David Gulling	204	0.8
Total votes		25,315	100.0

=== 2022 ===
Texas's 3rd congressional district Republican primary, 2022
Party	Candidate	Votes	%
Republican	Van Taylor (incumbent)	31,489	48.8
Republican	Keith Self	17,058	26.5
Republican	Suzanne Harp	13,375	20.8
Republican	Rickey Williams	1,731	2.7
Republican	Jeremy Ivanovskis	818	1.3
Total votes		64,471	100.0

Texas's 3rd congressional district general election, 2022
Party	Candidate	Votes	%
Republican	Keith Self	164,240	60.5
Democratic	Sandeep Srivastava	100,121	36.9
Libertarian	Christopher Claytor	6,895	2.5
Total votes		271,256	100.0
Republican hold			

=== 2024 ===
Texas's 3rd congressional district general election, 2024
Party	Candidate	Votes	%
Republican	Keith Self (incumbent)	237,794	62.5
Democratic	Sandeep Srivastava	142,953	37.6
Total votes		380,747	100.0
Republican hold			

== Notes ==
U.S. House of Representatives
Preceded by Van Taylor	Member of the U.S. House of Representatives from Texas's 3rd congressional district 2023–present	Incumbent
U.S. order of precedence (ceremonial)
Preceded by Hillary Scholten	United States representatives by seniority 347th	Succeeded by Eric Sorensen
