= Elaine Luria =

American politician (born 1975)

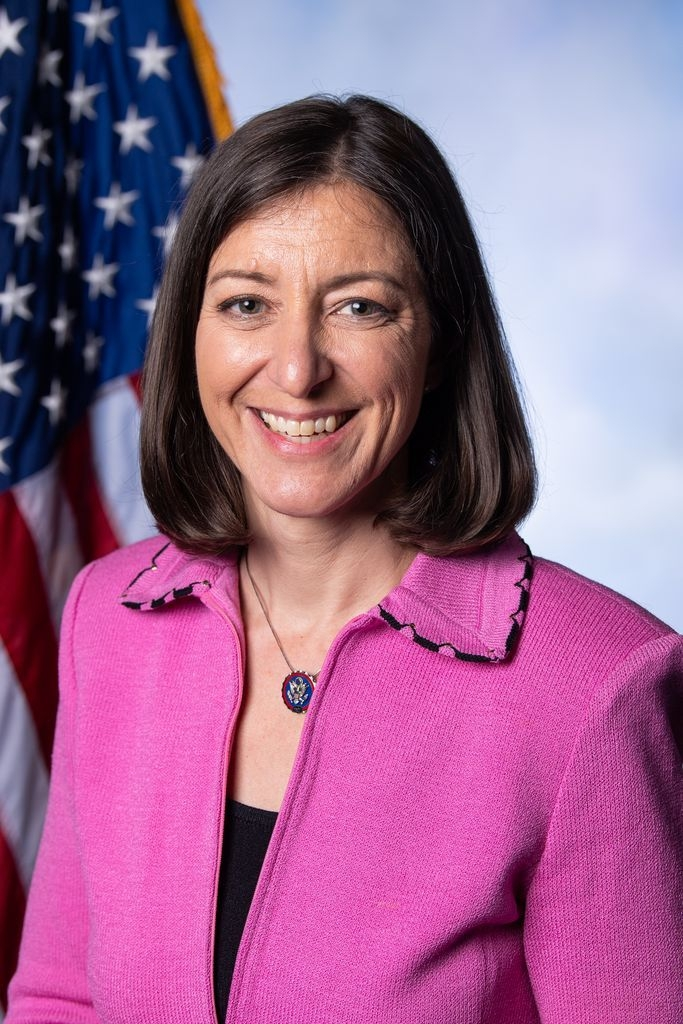
- Official portrait, 2022

Member-elect of the U.S. House of Representatives from Virginia's 2nd district
- Assuming office January 3, 2027
- Succeeding: Jen Kiggans
- In office January 3, 2019 – January 3, 2023
- Preceded by: Scott Taylor
- Succeeded by: Jen Kiggans

Personal details
- Born: Elaine Goodman Luria; August 15, 1975 (age 51) Birmingham, Alabama, U.S.
- Party: Democratic
- Spouse: Robert Blondin (m. 2005)
- Children: 1
- Education: United States Naval Academy (BS); Old Dominion University (MS)
- Website: Campaign website

Military service
- Allegiance: United States
- Branch/service: United States Navy
- Years of service: 1997–2017
- Rank: Commander
- Commands: Assault Craft Unit 2
- Luria's voice Luria supporting the PACT Act. Recorded July 13, 2022

Elaine Goodman Luria (/ˈlʊriə/; LUUR-ee-ə; born August 15, 1975) is an American politician and US Navy veteran who served as the U.S. representative from Virginia's 2nd congressional district from 2019 to 2023. A member of the Democratic Party, Luria is set to return to her old seat after winning the 2026 election in a rematch against Republican incumbent Jen Kiggans, who defeated her in 2022.

Luria served 20 years as a naval officer, mostly aboard ships, operating nuclear reactors as an engineer and rising to the rank of commander before her retirement in 2017. In 2018, she defeated Republican incumbent Scott Taylor in a Hampton Roads-centered district, and defeated him again in 2020.

In Congress, Luria was a member of the moderate New Democrat Coalition and the bipartisan Problem Solvers Caucus. She also served as vice chair of the House Armed Services Committee. She became one of Congress's most vocal advocates for expanded naval shipbuilding and a larger fleet, breaking with the Biden administration over its Navy budgets.

== Early life, education, and military service ==
Luria was born on August 15, 1975, in Birmingham, Alabama. Her mother Michelle's family, originally from Poland, immigrated to Jasper, Alabama, in 1906. The family sold goods to coal miners in Walker County, Alabama. In the early-1900s, Luria's great-grandfather helped establish a Reform Jewish congregation in Jasper, and her immediate family joined the Temple Emanu-El in Birmingham. Luria's mother and grandmother were active in the National Council of Jewish Women (of which her mother was president), Hadassah, the Temple Emanu-El Sisterhood, and the Birmingham Jewish Federation.

Luria graduated from Indian Springs School in 1993. She graduated from the United States Naval Academy in 1997 with a Bachelor of Science (BS), with a double major in physics and history and a minor in French. In 2000, Luria attended the United States Naval Nuclear Power School. While serving in the Navy and stationed aboard the flagship USS Blue Ridge, she earned a Master of Science (MS) degree in engineering management from Old Dominion University in 2004.

Luria served as a naval officer for 20 years, operating nuclear reactors as an engineer, where she rose to the rank of commander. Luria was among the first female American sailors to spend her entire career on combat ships. She commanded Assault Craft Unit TWO, a combat-ready unit of 400 sailors, from 2014 until her retirement in 2017. She held a Passover seder on an aircraft carrier after 9/11.

== U.S. House of Representatives ==
=== Elections ===
==== 2018 ====
Luria ran for the United States House of Representatives in Virginia's 2nd congressional district. In the June 10 Democratic primary, she garnered 62% of the vote, defeating Karen Mallard, who received 38%.

In the general election, Luria narrowly defeated Republican incumbent Scott Taylor with 51% of the vote to Taylor's 49%. She carried six of the district's nine county-level jurisdictions, including all but one of the district's five independent cities. She also carried Taylor's hometown of Virginia Beach.

==== 2020 ====
Luria ran for reelection. She defeated Taylor in a rematch, 52% to 46%. She was likely helped by Joe Biden carrying the district; notably, Biden carried Virginia Beach, the first Democrat to do so since Lyndon Johnson in 1964.

==== 2022 ====
Luria ran for reelection in 2022. Facing a difficult path to victory as a Democrat in a competitive district, she focused her campaign on defense policy and refrained from highlighting Biden's $1.5 trillion Build Back Better spending plan, for which she voted. Luria lost the election to state Senator Jen Kiggans.

==== 2026 ====
In November 2025, Luria said she will again seek the Democratic nomination in Virginia's 2nd congressional district. She framed the run as a comeback bid for the seat she lost in 2022, centered on the cost of living and opposition to the second Trump administration.

Luria won about 80 percent of the vote against three opponents in the August 2026 Democratic primary, setting up a general-election rematch with Republican incumbent Jen Kiggans. Election forecasters have rated the general election as a competitive toss-up race, and the Wall Street Journal called it the "high-stakes rematch that could decide the House."

On November 3, 2026, Luria won back her seat from Representative Kiggans who beat her four years ago.

=== Tenure ===
A member of the moderate New Democrat Coalition and the bipartisan Problem Solvers Caucus, Luria was frequently described as a national security-focused centrist during her first stint in the House. She chaired the House Veterans' Affairs Subcommittee on Disability Assistance and Memorial Affairs, where she worked on the disability-claims backlog and benefits for veterans exposed to toxic substances. Her Veterans' Compensation Cost-of-Living Adjustment Act was signed into law in 2019, and she strongly supported the Honoring our PACT Act of 2022.

Luria was one of 102 female members elected to the House in 2018, a record number, and was sworn in on January 3, 2019. During her time in office, Virginia's 2nd congressional district was centered on Hampton Roads. It included all of Poquoson, Virginia Beach, and Williamsburg cities and York County in Hampton Roads; parts of Norfolk and Hampton cities and James City County in Hampton Roads; and all of Accomack and Northampton counties on the Eastern Shore.

On Veterans Day 2019, Luria released a video announcing her support for an impeachment inquiry into President Donald Trump, which The Washington Post called "an unusual move for a moderate on the cusp of a tough reelection." During Trump's presidency, Luria voted in line with his stated position 11% of the time. As of June 2022 she had voted in line with Joe Biden's stated position 98.2% of the time.

==== Armed Services Committee ====
Luria joined the House Armed Services Committee as a freshman and, in her second term, was elected the committee's vice chair for the 117th Congress. Drawing on her 20-year Navy career, she became one of Congress's most vocal advocates for naval shipbuilding and a larger fleet. She repeatedly broke with the Biden administration over its shipbuilding budgets, opposing proposals to retire warships early and pressing to expand the fleet as a deterrent to China. In 2022, she co-sponsored a bipartisan amendment to the annual defense authorization act that added roughly $37 billion for additional ships and blocked the retirement of several vessels. It passed the committee 42-17 over the objection of Chairman Adam Smith, who nonetheless called her "incredibly effective."

==== Investigation into the January 6 U.S. Capitol attack ====
Luria was one of the original members appointed to the Select Committee to Investigate the January 6 Attack on the United States Capitol in 2021. Luria and Representative Adam Kinzinger, both veterans, co-led the eighth public hearing in July 2022, which examined Trump's inaction during the time between the end of his rally speech and his video telling rioters to go home.

On July 25, 2022, Luria posted on her Twitter account the original script of Trump's January 7 remarks and edits he made to it in which he had crossed out any references to DOJ action and condemnation was heavily toned down.

=== Political positions ===
==== LGBTQ+ rights ====
Luria voted against a procedural motion that Republicans sought to use to bring the Protection of Women and Girls in Sports Act, which would bar transgender women and girls from female school sports teams at federally funded institutions, to the House floor. She also co-sponsored the Equality Act, which adds sexual orientation and gender identity to federal anti-discrimination law, and voted for it when it passed the House in 2019 and again in 2021.

==== Defense ====
Luria was the lone Democrat to vote against repealing the Authorization for Use of Military Force Against Iraq Resolution of 2002 in 2021.

==== Domestic policy ====
While the federal government was in a partial shutdown, Luria said that she had asked for her salary to be withheld until federal workers were paid in January 2019. She participated in a bipartisan group of representatives seeking to broker a compromise to end the shutdown.

In February 2019, Luria introduced the Veterans' Compensation Cost-of-Living Adjustment Act of 2019, which increased the cost of living adjustments (COLAs) made to veterans. It earned bipartisan support and passed in September 2019.

==== Foreign policy ====
Luria is a self-described "unabashed supporter" of the U.S. relationship with Israel.

==== Immigration ====
Luria was listed as one of 60 House Democrats who expressed support for some kind of physical barrier on the border in January 2019.

==== Impeachment ====
In September 2019, Luria labeled herself a "security Democrat"—an idiom for freshman Democrats with national security experience—and called for an impeachment inquiry against Trump in a Washington Post op-ed. In an October 2019 town hall meeting in Virginia Beach, Luria charged that Trump had "Enlist[ed] the help of a foreign leader to influence and malign a potential political opponent to affect the outcome of our next election all under [the] guise of trying to fight corruption." Later in October 2019, Luria formally voted for an impeachment inquiry against Trump, and joined all but three House Democrats to vote for impeachment on both counts: abuse of power and obstruction of Congress in December 2019; all House Republicans voted no on both charges.

==== Environment ====
Luria accepts the scientific consensus on climate change and is concerned about the physical impacts of climate change on global instability and military readiness. She also believes the first Trump administration attempted to discredit military and scientific experts on the physical impacts of climate change, which she views as an aspersion to the national security and scientific apparatuses.

==== Stock trades ====
Luria opposes proposed legislation that would ban lawmakers from trading stocks.

==== Gun policy ====
Luria favors instituting red flag laws and universal background checks on all gun purchases.

=== Committee assignments ===
- Committee on Armed Services (vice chair)
  - Subcommittee on Seapower and Projection Forces
  - Subcommittee on Readiness
- Committee on Veterans' Affairs
  - Subcommittee on Disability Assistance and Memorial Affairs (chair)
  - Subcommittee on Oversight and Investigations
- Committee on Homeland Security
  - Subcommittee on Transportation and Maritime Security
- Select Committee on the January 6 Attack

=== Caucus memberships ===
- New Democrat Coalition
- Problem Solvers Caucus

== Electoral history ==
=== 2018 ===
2018 Virginia's 2nd congressional district election
Primary election
Party	Candidate	Votes	%
Democratic	Elaine Luria	17,552	62.30
Democratic	Karen Mallard	10,610	37.66
Write-in		10	0.04
Total votes		28,172	100.00
General election
Democratic	Elaine Luria	139,571	51.04
Republican	Scott Taylor (incumbent)	133,458	48.81
Write-in		399	0.15
Total votes		273,428	100.00

=== 2020 ===
2020 Virginia's 2nd congressional district election
Party	Candidate	Votes	%
Democratic	Elaine Luria (incumbent)	185,733	51.55
Republican	Scott Taylor	165,031	45.81
Independent	David Foster	9,170	2.55
Write-in		343	0.10
Total votes		360,277	100.00

=== 2022 ===
2022 Virginia's 2nd congressional district election
Party	Candidate	Votes	%
Republican	Jen Kiggans	153,328	51.63
Democratic	Elaine Luria (incumbent)	143,219	48.22
Write-in		442	0.15
Total votes		296,989	100.00

=== 2026 ===
2026 Virginia's 2nd congressional district election
Primary election
Party	Candidate	Votes	%
Democratic	Elaine Luria	33,658	80.26
Democratic	Nila Devanath	6,857	16.35
Democratic	Bill Fleming	855	2.04
Democratic	Patrick Mosolf	566	1.35
Total votes		41,936	100.00
General election
Republican	Jen Kiggans (incumbent)		
Democratic	Elaine Luria		
Independent	Matt Baker		
Independent	Bishop Staten		
Total votes			

== Post-congressional career ==
In February 2023, Luria launched the Defend Democracy PAC, a political action committee to support electing Democrats to the Virginia General Assembly.

== Personal life ==
Luria's husband, Robert Blondin, is also a retired naval commander and spent 27 years in the service. Luria has two stepchildren and a daughter born in 2009. As of 2018, the family resides in Norfolk, and she gave the commencement speech in May 2019 at Virginia Wesleyan University. Luria attends Ohef Sholom Temple, a Reform Jewish synagogue in Norfolk.

== See also ==
- Women in the United States House of Representatives
- List of Jewish members of the United States Congress

U.S. House of Representatives
Preceded by Scott Taylor	Member of the U.S. House of Representatives from Virginia's 2nd congressional district 2019–2023	Succeeded by Jen Kiggans
Preceded by Jen Kiggans	Member of the U.S. House of Representatives from Virginia's 2nd congressional district Taking office 2027	Elect
U.S. order of precedence (ceremonial)
Preceded by Barbara Comstock as Former U.S. Representative	Order of precedence of the United States as Former U.S. Representative	Succeeded by Bob Good as Former U.S. Representative
