= Rocking =

Rocking or Rockin may refer to:

== Music ==
=== Albums ===
- Rockin' (The Guess Who album)
- Rockin' (Frankie Laine album), 1957

=== Songs ===
- "Hajej, nynjej" Czech children's carol, recorded as "Rocking" by Julie Andrews on Christmas with Julie Andrews, 1982
- "The Rocking Carol", a Christmas carol by Percy Dearmer, 1928
- "Rockin'" (song), song by The Weeknd on Starboy, 2016
- "Rockin'", song by Kid Rock on Bad Reputation (Kid Rock album), 2022
- "Rockin'", song by Pat Travers, 1982
- "Rockin", a 2025 song by Shoreline Mafia

== Other uses ==
- Rocking chair
- Uprock, the street dance known as "Rocking"

== See also ==
- Rock and roll
- Rock music
- King of Rock and Roll (disambiguation) for the "Rock King"
- Rock and roll (disambiguation)
- Rock (disambiguation)
