= Fed Up =

Fed Up may refer to:

== Film, TV and media ==
- Fed Up (film), a 2014 American documentary film about obesity and sugar
- Fed Up! (2002 film), documentary about GM foods starring Vandana Shiva
- Fed-Up Party, puppet Ed the Sock's joke political party
- Fed Up! (book), a book by Texas Governor Rick Perry
- "Fed Up", a season 2 episode of The Loud House

== Music ==
- "Fed Up" (DJ Khaled song)
- "Fed Up", a song by Bounty Killer from the 1996 album My Xperience
- "Fed Up", a song by House of Pain from the album Truth Crushed to Earth Shall Rise Again
- "Fed Up", a 2007 song by Remi Nicole
- "Fed Up", a song by The Dogs, see Music of Detroit

== See also ==
- J'en ai marre! (I'm Fed Up)
