= King of Pop (disambiguation) =

King of Pop is a nickname usually associated with the American singer Michael Jackson (1958–2009).

King of Pop may also refer to:

- Several other musicians; see honorific nicknames in popular music
- King of Pop (album), a 2008 compilation album by Michael Jackson
- Kings of Pop, a 2002 album by Home Grown
- Kings of Pop (cover artist), who covered a song by will.i.am
- King of Pop Awards, an annual Australian pop music award from 1967 to 1978 and a compilation album King of Pop '74–'75

== See also ==
- King of Rock and Roll (disambiguation)
- Queen of Rock (disambiguation)
- Queen of Pop (disambiguation)
- Queen of Soul (disambiguation)
