= We Will Rock You (disambiguation) =

"We Will Rock You" is a 1977 song by Queen.

We Will Rock You may also refer to:

- We Will Rock You (musical), a musical based on the music of Queen
  - We Will Rock You (The Original London Cast Recording), a live album of the musical
  - We Will Rock You: 10th Anniversary Tour, a tour based on the musical's tenth anniversary
  - We Will Rock You: Australasian Edition, a cast recording
- We Will Rock You (video), a film of a Queen concert

== See also ==
- "Rock You", a 1984 hard rock song by the band Helix
- "Hajej, nynjej" (also known as "Rocking"), a Czech lullaby whose English-language version features the lyrics "We will rock you, rock you, rock you"
- "The Rocking Carol", a Christmas carol that has the chorus "We will rock you"
- "Rock You", a song by the Roots on their album Phrenology
