= Queen of Rock =

Queen of Rock, Queen of Rock and Roll, Rock Queen, Rock 'n' Roll Queen, or similar titles, may refer to:

== People ==
- Catherine Destivelle (born 1960; "Rock Queen"), French rock climber

=== Musicians ===
- Ella (Malaysian singer) (Nor Zila binti Aminuddin, born 1966), known in Malaysia as Ratu Rock ('Queen of Rock')
- Kenny Aviles of Kenny y los Eléctricos, Mexican singer, known in Mexico as Reina del Rock ('Queen of Rock')
- Lillian Briggs (1932–1998) American musician, known in the 1950s as the "Queen of Rock and Roll"
- Chi Coltrane (born 1948), American gospel and rock singer, known as "Queen of Rock"
- Alejandra Guzmán (Gabriela Alejandra Guzmán Pinal, born 1968), Mexican singer and actress, known in Mexico as la Reina del Rock, 'Queen of Rock'
- Wanda Jackson (born 1937), American singer-songwriter known as "Queen of Rockabilly"
- Joan Jett (Joan Marie Larkin, born 1958), American rock musician known as "Queen of Rock"
- Carole King (Carol Joan Klein, born 1942), American singer-songwriter known as "Queen of Rock"
- Rita Lee (Rita Lee Jones, 1947–2023), Brazilian singer-composer, known in Brazil as Rainha do Rock ('Queen of Rock')
- Madonna (Madonna Louise Ciccone, born 1958), American singer, usually known as the "Queen of Pop", also called "Queen of Rock"
- Stevie Nicks (Stephanie Lynn Nicks, born 1948), American singer-songwriter known as "Queen of Rock and Roll"
- Luo Qi (singer) (罗琦, born 1975), Chinese rock singer, known in China as 摇滚皇后, 'Queen of Rock'
- Elizabeth Ramsey (1931–2015), Filipina singer-comedienne-actress, known in the Philippines as the "Queen of Rock and Roll"
- Linda Ronstadt (born 1946), American singer known as "Queen of Rock"
- Ronnie Spector (1943–2022; "Rock Queen"), American singer
- Tina Turner (Anna Mae Bullock, 1939–2023), American-born singer known as "Queen of Rock and Roll"
- Karen Zoid (Karen Louise Greeff, born 1978), South African musician, known in South Africa as Koningin van Rock ('Queen of Rock')

== Music ==
- The Queen of Rock' a 'Billy, a 1997 album by Wanda Jackson
- "The Queen of Rock & Roll", a 1994 song by John Hartford from the album The Walls We Bounce Off Of
- "Queen of Rock 'n' Roll", a 1976 single by Jim Keays
- "Queen of Rock and Roll", a song from the 1980s American children's animated TV show Jem
- Rock and Roll Queen (album), a 1972 album by Mott the Hoople
  - "Rock and Roll Queen" (song), a 1972 song by Mott the Hoople, the title track of the eponymous album Rock and Roll Queen
- "Rock & Roll Queen" (single), a 2005 single by The Subways, off the album Young for Eternity
  - "Rock & Roll Queen" (song), a 2005 song by The Subways, released on the single "Rock & Roll Queen", off the album Young for Eternity
- Queen of Rock 'n' Roll (album), a 2023 compilation album by Tina Turner

== Other uses ==
- "Rock and Roll Queen" (Vinyl), a 2016 TV episode
- Rock Queen (film), a 1998 documentary film about Catherine Destivelle
- Rock Queen (book), a 2015 book by Catherine Destivelle

== See also ==
- King of Rock and Roll (disambiguation)
- Rock and roll (disambiguation)
- Queen (disambiguation)
- Rock (disambiguation)
- Queen of Pop (disambiguation)
- Queen of Soul (disambiguation)
- Honorific nicknames in popular music
- Rock and roll
- Rock music
