= Rock 'n' Roll High School (disambiguation) =

Rock 'n' Roll High School is a 1979 American musical comedy film

Rock 'n' Roll High School may also refer to:

- "Rock 'n' Roll High School" (song), a song by American punk rock group the Ramones
- Rock 'n' Roll High School Forever, a 1991 musical comedy film and sequel to the 1979 film
- Rock 'n' Roll Highschool, a studio album by the band Teddybears STHLM

== See also ==
- Rock and roll (disambiguation)
- High School (disambiguation)
