= Queen of Soul (disambiguation) =

Queen of Soul is a nickname most commonly associated with the American singer Aretha Franklin (1942–2018).

Queen of Soul may also refer to:

- Several other musicians, see honorific nicknames in popular music
- Queen of Soul (album), 1964 album by Etta James
- Queen of Soul: The Atlantic Recordings, 1992 Aretha Franklin 4-disc box set

== See also ==
- King of Rock and Roll (disambiguation)
- King of Pop (disambiguation)
- Queen of Pop (disambiguation)
- Queen of Rock (disambiguation)
