= King of Rock and Roll (disambiguation) =

The "King of Rock and Roll" is a nickname most commonly associated with American singer Elvis Presley (1935–1977).

King of Rock and Roll or similar may also refer to:

- Several other musicians, see honorific nicknames in popular music
- "King of Rock and Roll" (song), a song by Dio
- "The King of Rock 'n' Roll", a song by Prefab Sprout
- The King of Rock and Roll, a studio album by Little Richard
- The King of Rock 'n' Roll: The Complete 50's Masters, a compilation album by Elvis Presley

== See also ==
- Queen of Rock (disambiguation)
- King of Pop (disambiguation)
- Queen of Pop (disambiguation)
- Queen of Soul (disambiguation)
