= Rock and roll (disambiguation) =

Rock and roll is a genre of popular music that originated and evolved in the United States during the late 1940s and early 1950s.

Rock and roll or Rock n' roll may also refer to:

== Music ==
- Rock music or rock & roll, a broader musical genre that includes a range of styles that evolved from rock and roll
- Rock&Roll (band), a French indie rock band
- Rock 'n Roll Records, an American record label

=== Albums ===
- Rock and Roll (Beyond album)
- Rock'n Roll (Dread Zeppelin album)
- Rock 'n' Roll (Elvis Presley album), UK title of Elvis Presley
- Rock 'n' Roll (John Lennon album)
- Rock and Roll (The Mark of Cain album)
- Rock 'n' Roll (Motörhead album)
- Rock'n Roll (New York Dolls album)
- Rock 'n' Roll (Potshot album)
- Rock n Roll (Ryan Adams album)
- Rock & Roll (Vanilla Fudge album)
- Rock and Roll: An Introduction to The Velvet Underground
- Rock 'n' Roll Music (album), by The Beatles
- Foghat (1973 album), also known as Rock and Roll
- Rock & Roll (EP), an EP by Frank Turner
- Rock 'n' Roll (Buckcherry album)

=== Songs ===
- "Rock n Roll" (Avril Lavigne song), 2013
- "Rock and Roll" (Eric Hutchinson song), 2008
- "Rock and Roll" (Gary Glitter song), 1972
- "Rock and Roll" (Led Zeppelin song), 1972
- "Rock 'n' Roll" (Status Quo song), 1981
- "Rock & Roll" (The Velvet Underground song), 1973
- "Rock and Roll (I Gave You the Best Years of My Life)", by Kevin Johnson, 1973; covered by the Cats (1973), Mac Davis (1974), and Terry Jacks (1975)
- "Rock n' Roll (Will Take You to the Mountain)", a song by Skrillex from the EP Scary Monsters and Nice Sprites, 2010
- "Rock and Roll Music" (song), by Chuck Berry, 1957; covered by the Beatles (1964), and the Beach Boys (1975)
- "Rock and Roll", by the Boswell Sisters for the film Transatlantic Merry-Go-Round, 1934
- "Rock 'n' Roll", by the Cat Empire from Where the Angels Fall, 2023
- "Rock'n Roll", by Daft Punk from Homework, 1997
- "Rock & Roll", by Dio from Killing the Dragon, 2002
- "Rock and Roll", by Edan from Beauty and the Beat, 2005
- "Rock + Roll", by Eden from I Think You Think Too Much of Me, 2016
- "Rock & Roll", by Johnny Winter from Still Alive and Well, 1973
- "Rock N Roll", by Ken Carson from Project X, 2021
- "Rock 'n' Roll", by Krokus from One Vice at a Time, 1982
- "Rock and Roll", by Mac DeMarco from Guitar, 2025
- "Rock n Roll", by Pusha T from It's Almost Dry, 2022
- "Rock 'n' Roll", by Remi Nicole from My Conscience and I, 2007

== Film and television ==
- Rock'n'Roll (1959 film), a 1959 Australian documentary film
- Rock & Roll (2007 film), a 2007 Malayalam film directed by Renjith
- Rock'n Roll (2017 film), a 2017 French film
- Rock & Roll (TV series), a 1995 television documentary series (aka "Dancing in the Street") co-produced for PBS and the BBC

== Other uses ==
- Rock 'n' Roll (play), a play by Tom Stoppard
- Rock 'n' Roll (video game), a 1989 game for 8- and 16-bit systems
- Rock and Roll (dance), a competitive form of dance
- Rock 'n Roll (G.I. Joe), a fictional character in the G.I. Joe universe
- Rocking and rolling, a name for cueing techniques in sound and video recording
- Rock 'n Roll (pinball), a 1970 pinball machine by Williams
- 17058 Rocknroll, an asteroid in the Main Belt
- Rock 'n' Roll, a story of The Railway Series book "The Little Old Engine"

== See also ==
- "Mr Rock & Roll", a 2007 single by Amy MacDonald
- Mr. Rock 'n' Roll: The Alan Freed Story, a 1999 American television film
- Rock-A-Rolla, a music magazine
- Rocka Rolla, an album by Judas Priest
- RocknRolla, a 2008 British crime film directed by Guy Ritchie
- Rock 'n' Roll High School (disambiguation)
