= Chip Roy =

American politician (born 1972)

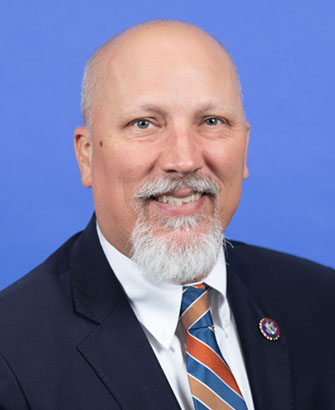
- Official portrait, 2022

Member of the U.S. House of Representatives from Texas's 21st district
- Incumbent
- Assumed office January 3, 2019
- Preceded by: Lamar Smith

Personal details
- Born: Charles Eugene Roy; August 7, 1972 (age 54) Bethesda, Maryland, U.S.
- Party: Republican
- Spouse: Carrah Key (m. 2004)
- Children: 2
- Education: University of Virginia (BS, MS); University of Texas, Austin (JD)
- Website: House website Campaign website
- Roy's voice Roy on the need to debate the withdrawal of troops from Syria. Recorded March 8, 2023

Charles Eugene "Chip" Roy (born August 7, 1972) is an American attorney and politician serving as the U.S. representative for Texas's 21st congressional district since 2019. Previously, he was Senator Ted Cruz's chief of staff and first assistant attorney general of Texas under Ken Paxton. He is a member of the Republican Party.

Roy was first elected to Congress in 2018, serving four terms from the 116th Congress in January 2019 through the 119th ending in January 2027. He is a member and policy chair of the House Freedom Caucus. In 2026, he ran for Texas Attorney General, losing the Republican nomination to state senator Mayes Middleton in a runoff.

== Early life and education ==
Roy was born in Bethesda, Maryland, and raised in Lovettsville, Virginia. His parents, Don and Rhonda Roy, were conservatives who supported Ronald Reagan and helped shape Roy's political views.

After graduating from Loudoun Valley High School, Roy attended the University of Virginia, receiving a Bachelor of Science in commerce in 1994 and a Master of Science in information systems in 1995. There, he worked as a dorm resident assistant for a year. After graduation Roy spent three years as an investment banking analyst, after which he decided to pursue a different career. He enrolled at the University of Texas School of Law, where he met his future wife, Carrah. He graduated in 2003 with a Juris Doctor.

== Early career ==
=== Cornyn staff ===
Though initially Roy saw politics "as an avocation, a sort of interest, but not something I would do anytime soon, if ever", his mind began to change when, while still in law school, he began working for then-Texas attorney general John Cornyn on his 2002 campaign for the United States Senate. After the September 11 attacks, Roy reflected on his goals. "I was in law school when September 11 happened. I will always remember that moment, crystallized in my head. That had a lot to do with my commitment to public service", he has said. When Cornyn was elected and made vice chairman of the Republican Committee and the Judiciary Committee, Roy served as his staff director and senior counsel. Roy provided counsel for Cornyn and his staff on legislative issues including nominations, intellectual property, crime, civil justice reform and advising him during the immigration reform debates under the George W. Bush administration. Roy worked for Cornyn until 2009.

Roy returned to Texas as a special assistant in the office of the United States attorney for the Eastern District of Texas. In 2006, Roy met Ted Cruz, then Texas solicitor general, during a strategy session discussing the case League of United Latin American Citizens v. Perry, a case about redistricting that Cruz argued before the United States Supreme Court.

=== Perry administration ===
Roy resigned from his job as a special assistant U.S. attorney after six months to be a ghostwriter on then-Governor of Texas Rick Perry's 2010 book Fed Up! and work for Perry's 2012 presidential campaign. The book served as a campaign agenda for Perry's campaign, and offered a range of Perry's positions, including criticism of the Social Security system as unconstitutional (calling it "a Ponzi scheme"), changing the election of U.S. senators back to state legislatures (they were made popularly elected by the Seventeenth Amendment), ending life tenure for federal judges, and repealing the 16th Amendment (which allows a federal income tax). The book also denounces as "overreach" federal efforts to regulate health care, labor conditions, energy policy, and pollution. In the book's acknowledgments section, Perry singled out Roy for "special recognition" for resigning his previous post "to devote himself full-time to the completion of the original manuscript" and his "amazing knowledge of the U.S. Constitution and other Founding documents, and a keen ability to frame federalist arguments in striking terms that make complicated law easier for non-lawyers like me to understand and discuss." In his review of the book, Gene Healy of the libertarian Cato Institute credited Roy as "the guy who did most of the heavy lifting in the book."

On April 1, 2011, Perry announced Roy as his choice for Texas's director of state-federal relations, an office whose duties include lobbying for federal funds for state institutions (such as grants to universities).

During the confirmation hearings for his position before the Texas Senate, Roy said he would oppose an "intrusive federal government that spends our money recklessly." He promised to help Texas legislators "push back on Washington where necessary" and stand up for "liberty, state sovereignty and an end to the crippling pile of debt and regulation coming from Washington that is destroying our nation and endangering the state." When asked about the recent Texas House vote to slash most of the office's funds, transferring them to a tuition reimbursement program for children of the military, he said it was "hardly surprising…I might have voted to cut it as well, based on what I understand of the office, but possibly without hiding behind the political gamesmanship of moving it from one account to another." He promised to consider eliminating the entire office if it didn't "stand for something." Roy's nomination was opposed by Texas state senator Kirk Watson, who pointed out that the office's mission was "to promote communication and build relationships between the state and federal governments" and asked Roy "when you or someone else" decided to redefine its purpose. The committee approved Roy's nomination, 6–1, with the full State Senate later confirming the nomination. Roy served in the office from April to October 2011.

The week of his 39th birthday in August 2011, Roy was diagnosed with Stage 3 Hodgkin lymphoma. He later said his experience battling cancer convinced him of the importance of "health-care freedom", and that examining his medical bills showed him "how truly convoluted our system is."

=== Cruz staff ===
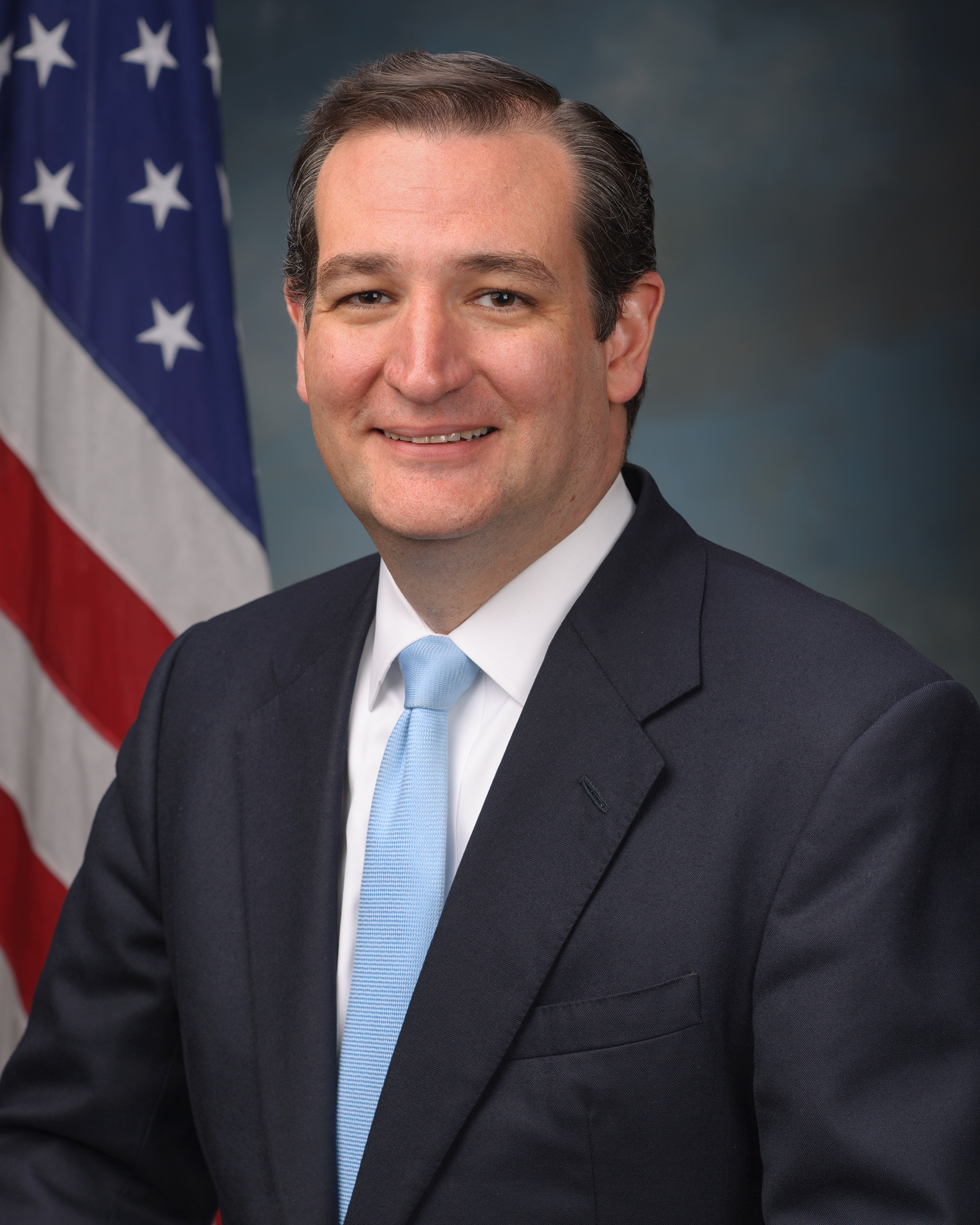
Roy served as Senator Ted Cruz's chief of staff and top political strategist

After Cruz's election to the Senate in 2012, Roy became his chief of staff. While working for Cruz, Roy gained attention for criticizing other Republicans who did not join Cruz in demanding Obamacare be defunded before voting to keep the government running past September 30, 2013. During the 2013 United States federal government shutdown, Roy's main tasks were behind the scenes, plotting a course through the media coverage and determining tactics when Republican allies deserted the cause and the party's leadership became increasingly hostile. Roy chastised defecting Republicans, and was quoted as saying Tom Coburn was serving in a "surrender caucus" and likening Mitch McConnell to Barack Obama. Cruz said Republicans who did not join him had fallen into "a powerful, defeatist approach…they're beaten down and they're convinced that we can't give a fight, and they're terrified." Their cause was joined by Marco Rubio, Rand Paul, Mark Meadows and Mike Lee.

The media picked up on Roy taking to Twitter to jab John McCain, sarcastically calling it "shocking" that "someone talking to [Democratic senator Chuck] Schumer 5x a day and the White House daily" did not support the hardball approach. Coburn complained about these tactics to the Washington Examiner, saying: "The worst thing is being dishonest about what you can accomplish, ginning everybody up and then creating disappointment." Roy's response on Twitter gained media attention: "Since when is a promise to fight disastrous policy 'dishonest?' No, the worst thing is giving up & leaving your base believing there is no need to be a Republican any longer." Coburn told a reporter that he had "no ill will" toward Roy: "He knows I'm not part of the surrender caucus." He added: "a good portion of it [Obamacare] is mandatory spending, and the only way to get rid of mandatory spending…is 67 votes because you got to override a presidential veto" and that Cruz's and Roy's tactics would result in the Democrats taking control of the House.

Roy told a reporter that his job was to advance Cruz's priorities, and he had not been told to stand down: "The Washington establishment uses every tool at its disposal to push its own narrative on the American public—and in this case, it's the narrative of 'we can't.' They plant stories, strong-arm members and try to create fake 'wins' for cover that simply do not change the status quo. It is important that we push back." In response to questions about Roy's behavior, McCain said, "He and Senator Cruz are entitled to their opinions, but I don't pay that much attention to that kind of thing because I believe my position. It wouldn't be the first person who has criticized me." Richard Burr, who supported defunding but not threatening to cause a shutdown, also was unmoved by Roy's quips: "It doesn't matter to me what he does. The only thing that's important is that I'm on Senator Cruz's bill to eliminate Obamacare."

On September 25, 2013, Cruz and Roy met with trusted staffers and Cruz read aloud from Psalm 40 (which includes the line "troubles without number surround me") and then took to the Senate floor for a 21-hour speech against Obamacare. Despite such efforts the shutdown did not result in the desired policy change: the Republican leadership brokered a deal with the Democrats, reopened the government, and Obamacare funding was only marginally affected. Politico called Roy an "architect" of Cruz's strategy, and he later told a reporter, "Was I intimately involved with it? Yes. Unapologetically. I think it was the right strategy. And but for the same hand-wringers in the Senate that continue to give us the status quo, we might have been successful."

In September 2014, as Cruz contemplated a 2016 presidential campaign, Roy's duties in his office moved from chief of staff to top political strategist. During the exploratory phase of Cruz's campaign, Roy and Cruz got into an argument about political tactics and strategy that became heated enough to cause Roy to leave Cruz's Senate staff. Despite the level of disagreement, they discussed working together in the future. Cruz later recalled, "We often agreed, but not always, and we would have vigorous debates. Chip never backs down, and we would have extended discussions about which battles should be the highest priority."

=== Texas assistant attorney general ===
In 2014, despite controversy over the Texas State Securities Board issuing a disciplinary order against him for soliciting investment clients without being registered in the state, Ken Paxton easily won election as Texas attorney general. He chose Roy as his first assistant attorney general, saying: "Chip is a longtime friend, and someone whose counsel I trust. I am pleased that he will bring his strong legal mind, devotion to liberty, and servant's heart to the Office of Attorney General as first assistant." Roy's continuing battle with cancer influenced his decision to return to Texas, as he wished to be close to his family rather than commute weekly to Washington, D.C. or travel extensively on a presidential campaign.

Stepping into his role in Texas's attorney general's office, Roy confronted over 28,000 active cases, including high-profile cases on voter ID and same-sex marriage. He also participated in the 2015 lawsuit United States v. Texas against President Obama's executive action on immigration. The case challenged the constitutionality of the Deferred Action for Parents of Americans (DAPA) program. Roy explained Texas's position to reporters: "the U.S. Senate and House aren't doing their job in standing up for and defending [the powers granted only to them by the Constitution's] Article 1, I think it is critical what Texas is doing in stepping up and defending when the president himself said repeatedly he didn't have the power to do this."

In July 2015, a Collin County grand jury indicted Paxton on two first-degree felony counts of securities fraud and a third-degree felony for failure to register as a securities dealer. Paxton maintained his innocence, but news stories continued to focus on the charges. Due to Paxton's decision to work from his home in McKinney rather than the capital in Austin, reporters covering the office's work highlighted the rolls of his solicitor general Scott Keller, his chief of staff Bernard McNamee, and especially Roy. With Paxton avoiding all but the friendliest audiences, speculation arose that Roy was the de facto attorney general.

In September 2015, while praising Roy at the Pflugerville First Baptist Church as one of the "visionaries on this religious liberties issue", Paxton said, "I get credit, sometimes not credit, for what happens in my office." MacNamee soon resigned in frustration over Paxton's behavior. Roy inadvertently drew unwanted attention to the situation in an interview about Texas's challenge to the DAPA program. When a reporter asked him how Paxton's legal problems affected the agency, Roy's response was seen as revealing Paxton's absence from running the office. He said, "We're in constant communication with the attorney general, and we're focused on doing our job every day to defend the state of Texas. ...The first assistant attorney general, the solicitor general, our head of civil litigation, all of us are charged to manage the daily affairs of this agency, and that's what we're doing."

When Paxton's name did not appear in a New York Times piece about a suit against Texas in the Supreme Court over abortion restrictions, his communications staff complained to Keller about it. Paxton traveled to Washington to hear the oral arguments, paying for his own ticket and submitting a copy of it to the state alongside the one his office had purchased for Roy to show how much money he had saved Texas. Eight days after the Supreme Court hearing, Paxton called his communications director, Allison Castle, who could not get any news organization to agree to interview him about the case. He demanded she resign or be fired. He then did the same to Roy, who resigned. Both were placed on emergency leave, which caused further controversy. Reporters also began to investigate whether Paxton had broken state law in the way he had hired staff: giving people the job before they filled out an application and without first advertising openings before filing them with people from outside the department. Paxton's choice to replace Roy was Jeff Mateer from First Liberty Institute, who had attracted notoriety by offering to represent, pro bono, any business that wished to sue the city of Plano over its anti-LGBT discrimination ordinance.

=== Cruz PAC ===
On March 10, 2016, the day after Paxton announced that Roy had "resigned to pursue other endeavors," he was named the executive director of the Trusted Leadership PAC, which was supporting Cruz's presidential campaign. The PAC was formed to bring the preexisting separate Cruz-supporting PACs into a single operating structure.

Controversy arose when it was discovered that Roy remained a state employee while working for the PAC. Roy responded that he had not received any pay from the PAC while he was on the state payroll, and only used his accrued vacation and compensatory time from the state after resigning to work for the PAC. This had left open the option for him to receive leave after his vacation and holiday time expired, which would have allowed him to continue receiving health benefits for his cancer treatment. After The Dallas Morning News reported on the matter, Roy fully resigned, maintaining that doing so was the result of a good report from his oncologist.

While working for the campaign, Roy called presidential candidate Donald Trump's conservative credentials into question, at one point tweeting, "@RealDonaldTrump Supports Planned Parenthood, which kills babies and puts them in a freezer, government funding of healthcare and Palestine."

At the time of Roy's hiring, pro-Cruz political consultant (and future Trump campaign manager) Kellyanne Conway had said, "This is a two-person race where Senator Cruz is building significant momentum and is the proven conservative, able to win the nomination and defeat Hillary Clinton," but Cruz dropped out of the race less than two months after Roy took over the PAC. Despite a scandal about the Cruz campaign's relationship with Cambridge Analytica, Roy and Trusted Leadership PAC had no interaction with the company.

=== Center for Tenth Amendment Action ===
By September 19, 2016, Roy had found employment as the director of the Center for Tenth Amendment Action for the Texas Public Policy Foundation (TPPF), a conservative think tank.

== U.S. House of Representatives ==
Roy was first elected to the 116th Congress beginning January 2019. He served four terms through the 119th Congress ending January 2027. He ran for a different office in the 2026 elections.

=== Elections ===
==== 2018 ====
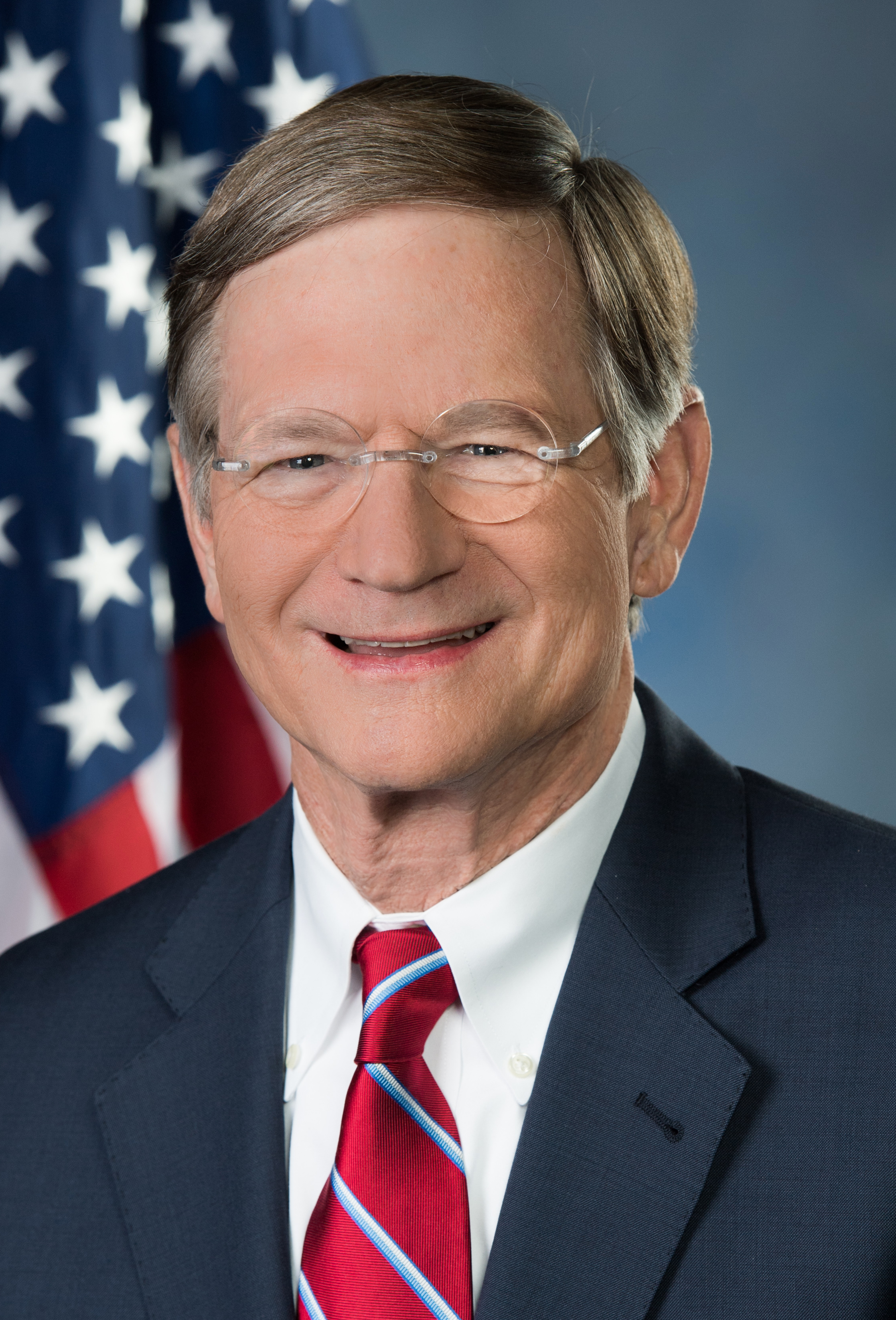
Roy ran to succeed Lamar Smith in the House of Representatives

In 2018, Roy ran for the United States House of Representatives in Texas's 21st congressional district to succeed Lamar Smith, who did not run for reelection. Covering his campaign, Politico likened him to Cruz. Roy finished first in an 18-candidate field and received Smith's endorsement in a runoff on May 22 against Matt McCall. Roy said he agreed with Smith in questioning the scientific consensus on climate change which clearly attributes it to human activity.

When he supported Cruz in the 2016 presidential primary, Roy's criticism of Trump caused some of his friends to describe him as committed to the "Never Trump" cause. By 2018, his position had changed. Roy praised Trump's job performance as president, citing his decision to pull the U.S. out of the Paris climate accords and his results in "regulatory relief, on tax relief, on judges, on the embassy in Jerusalem" and his attacks on "the swamp or the establishment or the status quo or whatever you want to call the inner workings of Washington, D.C." Roy also echoed Trump's position about a "deep state", which he defined as "entrenched bureaucrat[s] who hide something from the political decision-makers" causing "pushback from deep within the bowels of each of the agencies." He called for federal agencies "to be thinned out so that we don't have those issues."

Roy promised if elected to push back against the status quo and restrict the federal government's power, calling for Medicare to be delegated to the states, for Congress to pass a balanced budget, and for action to be taken to prevent judges from "legislating from the bench". He suggested that the House should attempt to pass no legislation the next term until it advanced a balanced budget amendment to the Constitution. He also held that there were threats from "porous borders, gangs and drug cartels" that he would address if elected. The Club for Growth supported his candidacy. The House Freedom Fund (aligned with the Freedom Caucus in the House) contributed $143,000 to Roy's campaign. By February, Cruz joined in campaigning for Roy, telling voters, "I know how he responds under pressure, under heat, and that he won't buckle."

Roy finished 10 points ahead of McCall in the Republican primary election. He beat McCall by 5% in the "top-two" runoff. McCall credited much of Roy's victory to Cruz's endorsement and efforts. McCall said that Cruz was able to convince others to endorse Roy, even Louie Gohmert, whom McCall hailed as his congressional role model. Roy defeated Democratic nominee Joseph Kopser, a businessman, aerospace engineer and veteran, in the general election, 50%–48%, a closer than expected margin. This was easily the closest race in the 21st since the GOP first took the seat in 1978; it was the first time since then that a Democrat won as much as 40 percent of the vote.

==== 2020 ====
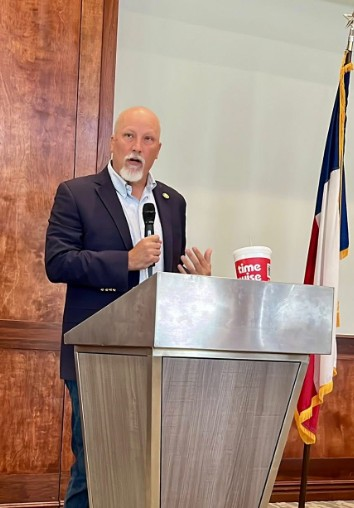
Congressman Chip Roy speaking to The Woodlands Republican Women, in The Woodlands, Texas, on October 21, 2025.

As the 2020 electoral season approached, Democrats sought to associate Roy with Cruz, whose popularity was seen as in decline.

Roy was reelected, defeating Democratic nominee Wendy Davis by seven points and winning eight of the district's 10 counties.

==== 2022 ====
The Wall Street Journal described Roy's Republican primary race of 2022 as "a case study in whether a conservative Republican usually aligned with Mr. Trump can survive politically after angering the former president—even a modest amount." Even before a challenger arose against Roy, Trump had called for him to be defeated in the Republican primary. By June 2021, physician Robert Lowry had filed with the Federal Election Commission to face Roy in the primary, with the possibility of more candidates entering the race by the December 13 deadline. Roy ended up winning the primary with 83.2% of the vote, receiving more than 10 times as many votes as Lowry, who was the closest challenger. Roy went on to win the general election as well with 63% of the vote after the district had been redrawn to be more Republican.

==== 2024 ====
In 2024, Roy was re-elected with 61.9% of the vote in the general election against Democratic candidate Kristin Hook.

=== Tenure ===
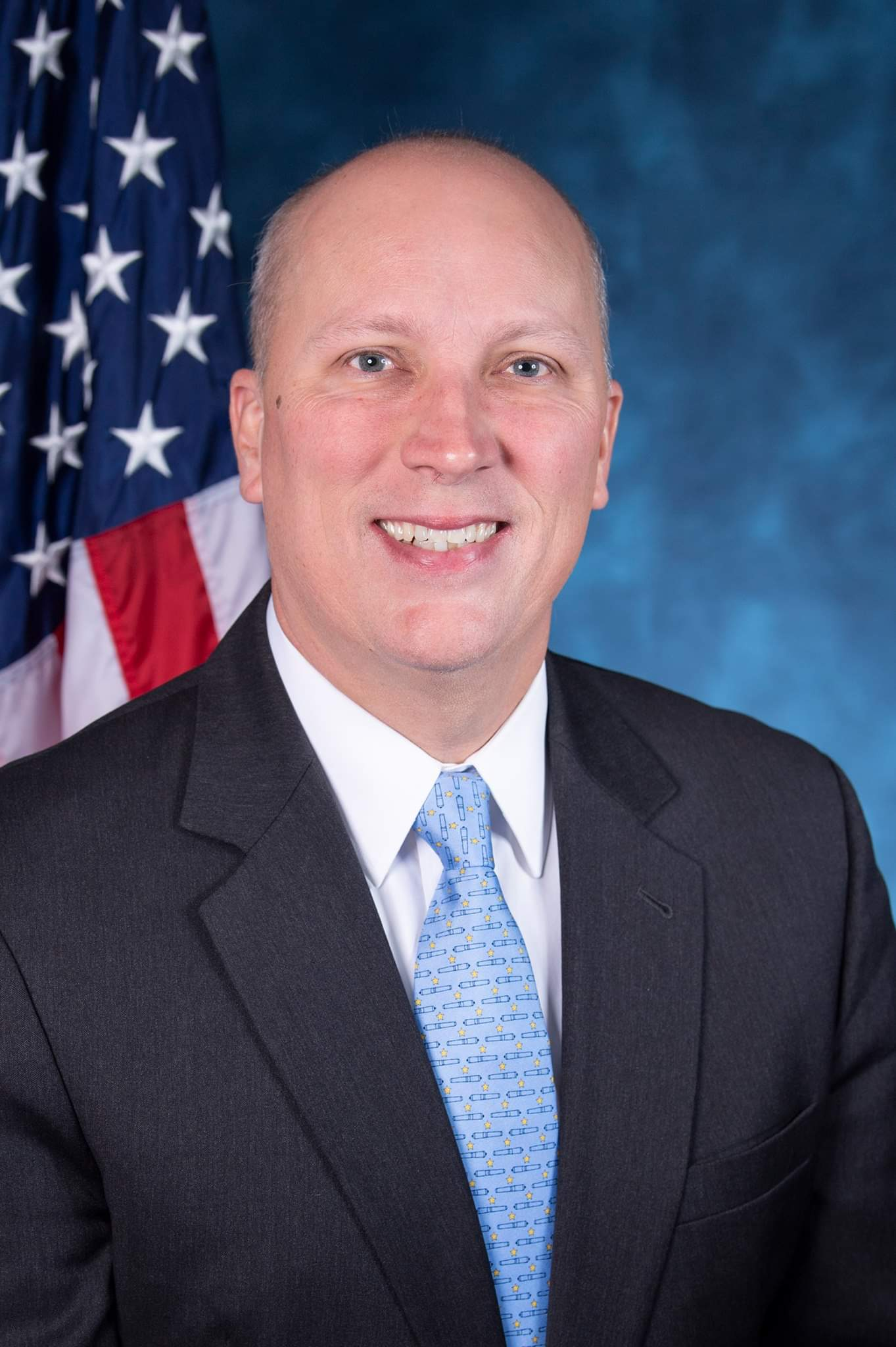
Roy during the 116th Congress

Coming into office, Roy cast himself as a conservative version of Alexandria Ocasio-Cortez: "I doubt she and I agree on many issues. But functionally, this place is broken." He was happy to be part of the Freedom Caucus: "they're serving as a check against the current broken system where the power brokers make decisions at the top and just say 'Here's what we're going to do'." He added that Republican power brokers in Congress lost control of the House because "You demonstrate rote incompetence when you are leaving us with a trillion dollars in deficits this year on top of $22 trillion in debt. You said you were going to do something to secure our border, and you didn't. And you said you were going to fight for—I use the term 'health care freedom'—and you didn't. It's hard to really take that to the people and say, 'Hey, send me back'."

Roy's first speech as a representative was on immigration and what he called "chaos and lawlessness on the southern border." He complained that "members of both sides of the aisle have buried their heads in the sand over the last several decades, talking instead of doing." Right-leaning news outlets hailed Roy's speech.

Soon after taking office, Roy opposed a bill in the House that tried to prevent Trump from withdrawing from NATO without Congress's consent. It passed, 357 to 22. When the House voted to give back pay to the 800,000 federal workers affected by the government shutdown, Roy opposed the measure. Roy was one of few Republicans to vote against the measure, which passed 411 to 7. Trump signed the bill into law.

In July 2021, Roy voted against the bipartisan ALLIES Act, which would increase by 8,000 the number of special immigrant visas for Afghan allies of the U.S. military during its invasion of Afghanistan, while also reducing some application requirements that caused long application backlogs; the bill passed in the House 407–16.

In 2021, a recording of Roy surfaced in which he said he wanted "18 more months of chaos and the inability to get stuff done" during a Democratic-controlled Congress and presidency. Roy's conservative positions have frequently put him in conflict with House GOP leadership.

==== Relief bill opposition ====
On May 24, 2019, Roy singlehandedly halted a House disaster relief funding bill that gave $19 billion in relief for communities hit by disasters, including $900 million for hurricane-damaged Puerto Rico, and fast-tracked $4 billion in grants to Texans suffering due to the effects of Hurricane Harvey. The money for Texas had been approved in 2018 but held up due to working out regulations with the Department of Housing and Urban Development and the Office of Management and Budget. Cornyn had championed the bill and Cruz voted for it. House leaders of both parties had agreed to advance the bill under a quick procedure rule that required unanimous consent of those in the chamber. Most members of Congress had already left Washington for the Memorial Day recess. The day before, the Senate had passed the bill 85–8, and the House had passed a similar version earlier in the month 257–150. Due to Roy's objection, the unanimous consent vote was derailed.

Roy blamed Nancy Pelosi for the previous delay in Texans receiving the funds and voiced his dislike of procedure being used.

During other pro forma sessions, Roy's tactic was adopted by Representatives Thomas Massie and John Rose, who returned to Washington during the recess week for two more similar unanimous consent request attempts. Ultimately Roy's action delayed the bill's passage for several days until lawmakers returned from recess.

Hurricane season began on June 1 and coastal communities soon began seeing flooding amid strong storms. The bill was stalled for 11 days before passing on June 3 by a margin of 354–58, with Roy voting against it. Roy received bipartisan criticism for his objection to the bill. He explained his vote against the measure, saying it added to the national debt and did not include additional spending for federal operations along the U.S.–Mexico border. Five other Texas representatives joined Roy in opposing the bill: Lance Gooden, John Ratcliffe, Van Taylor, Ron Wright, and Michael Cloud (whose district bore the direct brunt of Hurricane Harvey).

==== Procedural protest, 2019 ====
On June 12, 2019, Roy derailed the usually uneventful House procedural process for appropriation bills. During the first debate of a four-bill spending package of the upcoming 2020 fiscal year the chamber scheduled for working through amendments through most of the day, with roll call votes not expected until around 5:30 p.m., Roy rose in an effort to protest what he saw as Democratic inaction on Trump's $4.5 billion supplemental funding request for the Department of Homeland Security (to address what his administration held was urgently needed due to an increasing number of migrants at the southern border). From the floor he halted the normal process by making a motion to adjourn at 12:14 p.m. The motion was defeated, 146–244. Representative Andy Biggs then made another motion to adjourn, which was defeated, 140–254. Members of both parties voted against the motions and voiced complaints about the disruption. Members had been forced to leave committee hearings, markups, lunches, and other events for the unscheduled votes.

After the votes the House resumed normal business, beginning a debate on a rule governing proceedings on the fiscal package. While managing the debate on the rule for the Republican minority, Woodall yielded his time to several members of his conference. Each requested unanimous consent for immediate consideration of the border funding supplemental. The chair declined these, ruling the time may be yielded only for debate on the rule in question. When proceedings shifted to amendment debate and lawmakers proceeded to call for a voice vote on many of the amendments (most of them uncontroversial), Roy objected and asked for roll call votes on each one. This once again caused members to have to return to the chamber for unscheduled votes, and as Roy continued to use this tactic it became clear that the previous schedule, which anticipated finishing up no later than 11 p.m., would be extended until early in the morning.

Roy continued to call for roll-call votes for each of the dozens of amendments offered. This caused members of both parties to voice displeasure with him and cancel their evening plans. Roy himself canceled his plans for his 15-year wedding anniversary. The House finished voting at 4 a.m.

The Texas Tribune reported that by such tactics Roy within "a span of just three weeks…established a reputation as the leading obstructionist in the House."

==== Amending the ADA ====
On June 28, 2019, in response to the humanitarian crisis involving migrant children at the southern border, Roy proposed legislation to amend the Antideficiency Act (ADA) to allow the United States Border Patrol to accept donations from people who want to help migrant children directly. The bill was filed after Border Patrol officials turned away people attempting to donate supplies such as diapers, toys, and hygiene items, saying they could not accept donations due to the ADA, which prevents the government from accepting "any donations other than what Congress has allocated to it." (Note: According to a 2013 article in The Atlantic, the Antideficiency Act (ADA) was originally intended to prevent federal agencies, particularly the military, from overspending their annual budgets early in a fiscal year. Once their funds were depleted, prior to ADA, agencies would then request additional Congressional appropriations forcing Congress to pay so they would not breach their contracts. According to a 2018 CRS report, under the Antideficiency Act, an "agency must cease operations" if there is a "funding gap". In shutdowns, the criteria are complex. Since the early 1980s (CRS 2018:5) with a more stringent application of ADA, when there are government shutdowns in the United States, and an agency no longer has funds to operate, they must shut down. They cannot depend on voluntary work of their employees.)

==== Response to Paxton allegations ====
On October 5, 2020, while campaigning for reelection, Roy called for Paxton's resignation after seven senior leaders within his office (including Roy's replacement, Jeff Mateer) accused him of bribery, abuse of office, and other charges. Roy noted that rather than address the charges and demonstrate their falsity, Paxton had attacked the staffers' character. He took particular issue with Paxton's choice "to attack the very people entrusted, by him, to lead the office—some of whom I know well and whose character are beyond reproach."

Hours after Roy's call for him to step down, Paxton released a statement saying, "Despite the effort by rogue employees and their false allegations I will continue to seek justice in Texas and will not be resigning." The charges arose from Paxton's relationship with Nate Paul, an Austin real estate developer who donated $25,000 to Paxton's 2018 campaign. Paxton claimed that his office had been referred a case investigating an FBI raid in August 2019 of Paul's offices and home which had "allegations of crimes relating to the FBI, other government agencies and individuals". When it was brought to Roy's attention that Paul had donated $2,700 to him the same 2018 electoral cycle, Roy said he did "not recall meeting Mr. Paul and it shows as an online contribution."

==== Response to 2020 presidential election ====
Over 100 text messages gathered by the January 6th Commission revealed the coordination by Roy and Utah's U.S. Senator Mike Lee with Trump Chief of Staff Mark Meadows to overturn Trump's defeat in the 2020 election.

On November 7, 2020, before traveling to Georgia to help fight the election results there, Roy texted Meadows: "Dude, we need ammo. We need fraud examples. We need it this weekend": two days earlier, he had texted Meadows: "We have no tools / data / information to go out and fight RE: election / fraud. If you need / want it, we all need to know what's going on." On the same day, he also appealed to Meadows to have "The President tone down the rhetoric, and approach the legal challenge firmly, intelligently and effectively without resorting to throwing wild desperate haymakers, or whipping his base into a conspiracy frenzy." On November 19, 2020, he texted Meadows to express his concern for the lack of evidence, writing: "Hey brother - we need substance or people are going to break."

On December 10, 2020, Roy wrote in opposition to Paxton's lawsuit Texas v. Pennsylvania, demanding four other states' election results be overturned as part of Trump's false claims that Joe Biden's victory in the 2020 presidential election was the result of widespread voter fraud. Despite 106 of his fellow House Republicans filing an amicus brief in support of the lawsuit, Roy wrote, "I will not join because I believe the case itself represents a dangerous violation of federalism & sets a precedent to have one state asking federal courts to police the voting procedures of other states. I cannot support an effort that will almost certainly fail on grounds of standing and is inconsistent with my beliefs about protecting Texas sovereignty from the meddling of other states. Our remedy must be, from this day forward, to decline to allow the usurpation of our authority as people—through our states—to govern ourselves in all respects." Cornyn also questioned Paxton's lawsuit, telling reporters "I, frankly, struggle to understand the legal theory of it." After the Supreme Court declined to hear the case, Roy told a reporter, "It was clearly evident and obvious that it would have zero chance of success for anybody who understands the law and understands the Supreme Court and understands how these cases are going to go."

On December 31, 2020, in reference to attempts to challenge the results of the 2020 election, Roy texted Meadows: "The President should call everyone off. It's the only path. If we substitute the will of states through electors with a vote by Congress every 4 years, we have destroyed the electoral college"; the next day he texted Meadows that if Trump "allows this to occur, we're driving a stake in the heart of the federal republic." Roy joined fellow Republican Legislators Thomas Massie, Kelly Armstrong, Ken Buck, Mike Gallagher, Nancy Mace, and Tom McClintock in issuing a statement on January 3, 2021, against their colleagues' efforts to challenge the results of the 2020 election. They signed a letter that, while giving credence to the idea that "significant abuses in our election system resulting from the reckless adoption of mail-in ballots and the lack of safeguards maintained to guarantee that only legitimate votes are cast and counted," held that "only the states have authority to appoint electors, in accordance with state law. Congress has only a narrow role in the presidential election process. Its job is to count the electors submitted by the states, not to determine which electors the states should have sent." They pointed to the Twelfth Amendment in support of their position, and wrote, "As of this moment, not a single state has submitted multiple conflicting slates of electoral votes. …Unless that happens between now and January 6, 2021, Congress will have no authority to influence the outcome of the 2020 presidential election." Congressional action despite this "would amount to stealing power from the people and the states. It would, in effect, replace the electoral college with Congress, and in so doing strengthen the efforts of those on the left who are determined to eliminate it or render it irrelevant." The letter called on Republican legislators to remember their oath: "We must respect the states' authority here. Though doing so may frustrate our immediate political objectives, we have sworn an oath to promote the Constitution above our policy goals. We must count the electoral votes submitted by the states."

On the same day as the joint statement, Roy objected to the seating of 67 incoming representatives from states that Trump falsely claimed rigged their elections against him: Arizona, Georgia, Michigan, Nevada, Pennsylvania, and Wisconsin. If his Republican colleagues (including Gohmert and Cruz) were going to hold that ballots should be questioned about the presidential race (calling for an emergency 10-day audit), Roy maintained that no certainty could be granted for any race. He said "a number of my colleagues...have publicly stated that they plan to object to the acceptance of electors from those particular six states due to their deeply held belief that those states conducted elections plagued by statewide, systemic fraud and abuse that leaves them absolutely no way for this chamber or our constituents to trust the validity of their elections. Such allegations, if true, raise significant doubts about the elections of at least some of the members of the United States House of Representatives that, if not formally addressed, could cast a dark cloud of suspicion over the validity of this body for the duration of the 117th Congress." He added, "It would confound basic human reason if the presidential results were to face objection while the congressional results of the same process escaped without public scrutiny." Roy apologized to those who had come to the swearing-in ceremony and said that if a colleague objected to his own seating in response he would welcome a vote.

Due to Roy's actions, the House held a vote on the matter and the result was 371 to 2 in favor of moving ahead with the swearing in of all members. The Dallas Morning News wrote that Roy's actions were "a dramatic escalation in the GOP feud" over the counting of electoral votes, noting Roy was in the minority of his party but "a conservative firebrand...[who] has developed a reputation for a damn-the-consequences approach to doing what he thinks is right, even if it means irking his fellow Republicans."

Roy spent most of January 5, 2021, working on the remarks he planned on giving on the House floor the next day. He called constitutional scholars as well as other members to sharpen his writing. At the end of the day, when returning to his Virginia apartment, he stopped at a sports bar and was troubled by what he saw: "The place was filled with MAGA Trump supporters. Absolutely filled. I kept hearing people say, 'Liberals are going to be upset tomorrow when the vice president stops this steal and gives this election back to the president.' I heard that repeatedly from people in that bar. I had called the Sheriff of Hays County earlier that day to tell him to look after Carrah and the kids and I told friends here in town to look after Carrah and the kids because I could tell things were getting a little amped up. And that night I re-texted the sheriff and said 'Please be keeping an eye out for Carrah and the kids' because the temperature was so high."

The next day, when there was an objection to counting Arizona's electoral votes, Roy went with the other members of the House to debate their acceptance. He began seeing notifications on social media of an angry mob outside the Capitol and began texting his staff to try to ensure their safety in the Longworth office building. Legislators paused the debate when the Capitol police announced a breach in the building, but thinking it isolated, resumed debate. Roy was in the well of the lectern about fourth in line to the microphone, where he planned to object to those objecting to the electoral votes. After Capitol police instructed members to hunker in place and make use of their emergency gas masks, Roy tweeted, "To those storming the Capitol - I am on the House floor and I will not be deterred from upholding my oath, under God, to the Constitution by mob demand." Roy felt to stay in the chamber would be like a "sitting duck" and was able to get Capitol police to direct representatives to a secure exit. Upon receiving their instructions, Roy went to the indicated door and called for his fellow members to exit through it while he held it open.

During the January 6 Capitol attack, Roy was in the House chamber. He tweeted to Trump, "Mr. President - get to a microphone immediately and establish calm and order. Now. And work with Capitol Police to secure the Capitol. It's the last thing you'll do that matters as President." He later told a reporter, "We must enforce the law. People have breached the Capitol, they need to go to jail. It's dangerous. A lot of people there with a lot of emotions running high. Look, I wish the president had spun people to—as I said, on the floor of the House of Representatives [Wednesday] night—to believe things that were not going to happen, and that was unfortunate." As Congress prepared to return to the chambers, Roy tweeted, "We will reconvene. We will vote to accept the electors from the states, as instructed by the Constitution. That is our job."

Returning to the chamber once safety was restored, Roy addressed the House, "Many of my colleagues were poised this afternoon to vote to insert Congress into the constitutionally prescribed decision-making of the states by rejecting the sole official electors sent to us by each of the states of the union. I hope they will reconsider. I can tell you that I was not going to, and I will not be voting to reject the electors. And that vote may well sign my political death warrant. But so be it. I swore an oath to uphold the Constitution of the United States—and I will not bend its words into contortions for political expediency and then claim I am honoring that oath." In the two House votes that challenged the electors of Arizona and Pennsylvania, Roy voted to certify the electors appointed by those states.

Even as Roy's favorability dropped significantly in his district, he said he had no regrets: "I did not take an oath to the political expediency of either Donald Trump or any other member of a political party. I took an oath to the Constitution of the United States. My view is immovable in that regard. And for those raising questions about it, I want to know where they were—precisely where they were—when a Capitol Hill police officer was getting his head bashed in by a fire extinguisher by an angry mob spun up in no small part by the president's irresponsible actions." Roy told a reporter that Republicans were "being fed misinformation" and that one of his responsibilities was to counsel voters on just how they were misled.

==== Second impeachment of Donald Trump ====
During the second impeachment of Donald Trump, Roy held that Trump's behavior "was clearly, in my opinion, impeachable conduct, pressuring the vice president to violate his oath to the Constitution." Still, Roy opposed impeachment. He held that the Democratic leadership in the House "drafted articles that I believe are flawed… focusing on the legally specific terms of incitement and insurrection. Even noting impeachment does not require meeting a certain legal standard – the danger for open speech & debate in this body and for the Republic generally is high – if the House approves the articles as written." If accepted, he said, "The language of this impeachment will be used to target members of this body under section 3 of the 14th Amendment. It will be used to suggest that any statements we make are subject to review by our colleagues and send us down the perilous path of the cleansing political speech in the public square."

Roy joined all of Texas's House Republicans in voting against impeachment. When asked whether he or any of his fellow Republicans had been threatened with violence if they voted to impeach, Roy said, "I'm not aware of any specific threats against me or anybody else. Honestly, if somebody would have threatened me, I probably would have said FU and voted to impeach. I just don't react well to that sort of thing."

==== Defense of Ted Cruz ====
In events leading up to the insurrection at the Capitol, reporters observed an ideological split between Roy and Cruz. On January 5, Roy forced members of the House to go on record in a voice vote concerning the seating of 67 representatives-elect from the six states that Trump asserted had invalid elections, a move The Washington Post called a "gutsy step" that was "putting a spotlight on the hypocrisy of his fellow Republicans" for contesting the presidential results in those states but not the results for other races in those states, though the same methods were used to tabulate votes.

That same day the media learned that Cruz would join representatives Andy Biggs and Paul Gosar in objecting to the certification of Arizona's electoral votes, despite Attorney General William Barr's declaration that there was no evidence of fraud and despite every lawsuit put forward to challenge the outcome in Arizona having been dismissed or dropped by Trump's legal team. Cruz led a coalition of 11 Republican senators demanding an audit. Cruz's objections to Arizona were joined by Senator Josh Hawley challenging Pennsylvania's electoral votes and Senator Kelly Loeffler those of Georgia. In contrast, Roy called on his fellow legislators to recall that "we have sworn an oath to promote the Constitution above our policy goals" and that they had a duty to follow its text.

The Post contrasted Roy with Cruz, who it said "is stoking his 2024 presidential hopes by helping to lead a dishonest drive to question the electoral college results." James Tilove of Texas Monthly wrote of Cruz and Roy, "Their paths on January 6 could not have been more divergent, with Roy denouncing the president and the elector challenges, and Cruz continuing that night to press his objection to certifying the Biden electors from Arizona—the first of two states voted on—even after witnessing the terrible passions the doomed maneuver had stirred." Roy acknowledged that he and Cruz disagreed on how to honor their oaths to the Constitution, but said, "My friendship with Senator Ted Cruz is immovable. I think everybody needs to dial it down on both kinds of extremes. Those attacking [Cruz and some others] and calling them seditionists, it's absolutely absurd. We can agree to disagree on these things and we need to. I'll have more to say on that later but my friendship with Senator Ted Cruz is not up for negotiation."

On January 28, Representative Alexandria Ocasio-Cortez expressed a desire in a tweet to "know more" about the stock trading app Robinhood, which had blocked some retail investors' trading while hedge funds faced no such constraints. When Cruz tweeted his agreement, Ocasio-Cortez rebuffed him, holding that his calling the Electoral College votes into question had helped incite the January 6 insurrectionists, some of whom called for violence against her. She tweeted: "I am happy to work with Republicans on this issue where there's common ground, but you almost had me murdered 3 weeks ago so you can sit this one out. Happy to work w/ almost any other GOP that aren't trying to get me killed. In the meantime if you want to help, you can resign."

Roy objected to Ocasio-Cortez's assertions in a letter to Pelosi demanding that she be forced to apologize or face sanctions, saying "she accused Senator Ted Cruz, in essence, of attempted murder. it is completely unacceptable behavior for a Member of Congress to make this kind of scurrilous charge against another member in the House or Senate for simply engaging in speech and debate regarding electors as they interpreted the Constitution. …It is my sincere hope that we all stop this heightened rhetoric and move forward to actually do the work the American people sent us here to do."

On February 1, Ocasio-Cortez detailed her experience on January 6, which was compounded by the trauma of being a sexual assault survivor, saying, "Ted Cruz and Representatives Chip Roy, and, oh, by the way, some of the other representatives who actually encouraged people to threaten members of Congress, or tweeted out the location of the Speaker, are now telling me to apologize for saying and speak truth to what happened. These are the tactics that abusers use. The folks who are saying, 'We should move on,' 'We shouldn't have accountability,' etc., are saying, 'Can you just forget about this so we can do it again?'" Roy replied that he was saddened to learn she had been a victim of sexual assault, but "I will not be swayed from my beliefs about right and wrong—regarding this or anything else." He took issue with being accused of using abuser tactics: "Her comparison of my defense of colleagues to her circumstances were again inappropriate…It does not change the fact that her allegation against Sen. Cruz was completely unacceptable for a Member of Congress to make against another member for engaging in free speech and debate about what our Constitution says about electors. Nor does it change my position that she should apologize for and retract those remarks."

==== Procedural protest, 2021 ====
On March 8, 2021, 13 suspension bills—bills brought up under suspension of House rules—were scheduled to be put forward on the House floor, including a measure with overwhelming Republican support to present the U.S. Capitol Police with a Congressional Gold Medal. These plans were scrapped because Roy and Representative Marjorie Taylor Greene expressed their intent to demand recorded roll call votes for each bill. As this parliamentary maneuver would have forced voting to go into the early morning, the leadership rescheduled the voting.

Of the delay, Roy said, "We need to continue to have conversations about every bill that's moving through the floor." He held that instead of the suspension calendar being "done right", the Democratic leadership was "jamming through 10 Democrat bills [and] three Republican bills on a Monday we fly back, while we're jamming through a $2 trillion bill which we have no say in, while we've got fences around the Capitol, we've metal detectors, etc. …We need to have a conversation in this town about how to make the House work again. That's what we're doing." He said his motivation was to force conversations over how to make Congress "work better" as "This place is completely dysfunctional."

Roy also criticized the Democratic leadership for doing away with the "motion to recommit", which Republicans in the previous Congress had used to force last-minute changes to legislation on the House floor. House minority whip Steve Scalise made clear the House Republican leadership had not planned or approved Roy's remarks, but also said he too wanted "to see an open process."

Not all of the GOP Leadership opposed Roy; conference chair Liz Cheney said, "This process is not going to be able to continue smoothly as long as the Democrats continue to try to ram pieces of legislation through without adequate hearings, without adequate debate and discussion, without adequate ability to offer amendments, without a motion to recommit. …The majority needs to understand we are not interested in a situation where they have taken away so many rights of the minority and they expect things are going to operate smoothly. It shouldn't be a surprise to anyone that this is going on." Democrats characterized the moves as producing nothing but pointless delay and agitation. They singled out Greene as merely attention-seeking due to having been stripped of her committee assignments in February, and her repeated disruptions of the legislative process (such as discussion of the Equality Act) by use of "motions to adjourn debate", forcing members to hurry to the House floor to vote to remain in session.

The Republican caucus, increasingly annoyed by Greene's tactics, were more supportive of Roy's, as the timing allowed both the protest to gain attention, along with a rescheduling that prevented mass disruption. Hoyer and Minority Leader Kevin McCarthy held talks on how to address Roy's and Greene's maneuvers. In its coverage of the episode, Politico called Roy "a master of procedural delays on the floor." Due to changes in the rules on account of the COVID-19 pandemic, each roll-call vote took at least an additional 45 minutes longer than under normal circumstances, and a growing number of Republicans joined with Democrats in complaining about the delays.

===== Bills honoring Capitol Police =====
Among the bills that were rescheduled due to Roy's procedural protest was one giving Congressional Gold Medals to the Capitol Police and the assisting police forces who withstood the January 6 attack on the Capitol. When the measure received a roll call vote on March 17, it did not pass with unanimous support. Twelve Republicans voted against it, objecting to the use of the word "insurrectionists". Roy, who had earlier said, "These words all matter, right? …I have to study the language fully", supported the measure. The final vote tally was 413–12.

The bill moved to the Senate, which had passed its own version. A new bill was created to resolve the differences between the two versions. The largest change was the addition of having a medal displayed inside the Capitol itself, and lines that added those Capitol Police officers who suffered under the car ramming attack on a Senate security barricade on April 2, 2021. The revised bill returned to the House and was put up for a vote on June 15. Despite his vote in March, Roy joined 20 other Republicans in voting against this version, which passed, 406–21. Roy released a statement saying the original "legislation has since been amended to include events that have absolutely nothing to do with January 6th. Instead of honoring our men and women of law enforcement, Democrats are playing political games with the tragedy of April 2, 2021."

==== Leadership bid ====
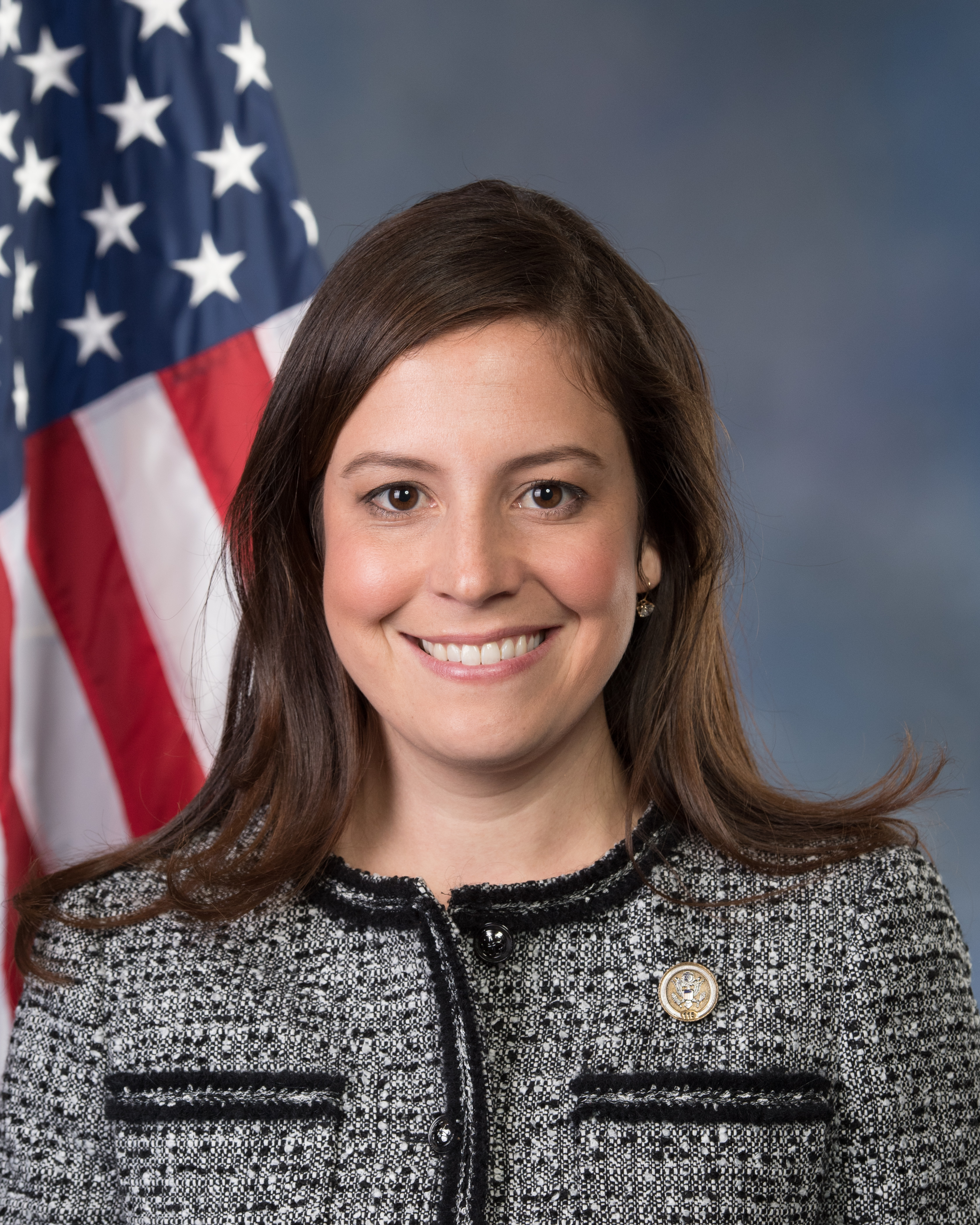
Elise Stefanik defeated Roy to become Chair of the House Republican Conference

Roy defended Representative Liz Cheney when the House voted to strip her of her position as chair of the House Republican Conference over her criticism of Trump. On January 13, 2021, he said: "It has come to my attention that a number of my colleagues are circulating calls for Liz Cheney to step down from, or to be removed as, chair of the Republican Conference for her position in support of impeachment of the president. I reject this call, and offer my support. …there can be little debate that, among other things, the president's pressure exerted on Vice President Pence to violate his oath, and the false hope it sent to emotionally charged supporters, was wrong, troubling, and impeachable. Liz should be commended, not condemned, for standing up in defense of the Constitution and standing true to her beliefs."

On May 11, Roy released a memo calling the conference to be clear that the controversy over Cheney was not about her position that the election "was not stolen", but rather that she had "forfeited her ability to be our spokesperson by pulling us into distraction. …looking backwards while repeatedly and unhelpfully engaging in personal attacks and finger-wagging towards President Trump rather than leading the conference forward with a unifying message." He said the conference should be "fighting to stop the radical Democrat agenda" rather than "falling prey to the high drama of swamp politics." After Representative Elise Stefanik announced that she would run to succeed Cheney, Roy and other conservative Republicans had discussed concerns over Stefanik's comparably moderate voting record, with Roy taking the lead in this group. His May 11 memo accused Stefanik of campaigning as a Republican but supporting the Democrats' agenda once sworn in.

Representative Lance Gooden told a reporter that with the amount of support Stefanik had gathered, her victory seemed virtually assured, so "One of the problems of those who had issues with Elise were that no one had really stepped forward to run against her, they were being critical, but no one really seemed to have the nerve to put their name down. So it seems as if Chip Roy is that candidate." Roy's fundraising campaign sent out donation requests that emphasized his opposition to Cheney.

Cheney was ultimately ousted from her position as chair by voice vote with no one objecting.

By May 13, shortly before a scheduled candidate forum, Roy officially announced his candidacy for the position. He cited what he saw as Stefanik's lack of conservative qualifications and the rapid pace of the process as his reasons for running. (After Cheney was ousted that Wednesday, McCarthy had scheduled the forum for Thursday evening and the vote for Friday morning.) After Trump released a statement opposing Roy, the conservative group FreedomWorks came out in support of Roy, saying they were pleased to hear of his nomination, and that "Rep. Roy has a lifetime 100% voting record on our scorecard. He has demonstrated that Republicans can legislate based on conservative principles and also get elected in competitive districts."

Around 60 House Republicans gathered for the candidate forum to hear pitches between Roy and Stefanik to take over the position. The forum was described as a friendly and formal back-and-forth, with Roy contending that he was the more conservative choice, and Stefanik emphasizing her work to elect GOP women along with her ability to fundraise. Both promised to set aside their personal views to better deliver party messaging. Some attendees told reporters that they felt many in the audience had previously decided who they would support before the forum was even held. Roy did not respond to any questions after the forum: "We are going to have a vote tomorrow in the Republican conference." When asked whether Trump's endorsement of Stefanik and bashing of him concerned him, Roy likened the reporters to "vultures" and said: "This is all D.C. swamp business."

In contrast, Stefanik called the forum a "great discussion", said she had cross-conference support and "we are in a strong position." On May 14, the day of the election, Representative Ken Buck of the Freedom Caucus formally nominated Roy, and his nomination was seconded by Boebert. Roy lost the election to Stefanik in a secret ballot, 134–46. Afterward he released a statement congratulating Stefanik, but taking pride in being able to "provide an alternative with a proven record of standing up not for politicians—but for freedom, the Constitution, and the conservative principles Americans hold dear."

==== Legal concerns around January 6 rioters ====
Roy did not support the House measure to create the January 6 commission. He held that forming a commission was not "a responsible and proper way" to investigate the issue, and that "The proposed commission does not have powers that existing law enforcement and existing congressional committees don't already have; however, it does have an unlimited budget and a vague mandate." The bill passed the House on May 19, 2021, by a vote of 252 to 175.

On May 13, Roy and Representative Thomas Massie sent Attorney General Merrick Garland a letter expressing concern that those facing federal charges for participation in the January 6 rioters would be subject to "overly aggressive tactics, overcharge, and abuse of power of the federal government in order to satisfy favored political groups." They claimed that they had heard reports that Assistant U.S. Attorneys were not allowed discretion to "enter into plea deals without permission from political appointees" at the Department of Justice. They also wrote, "there are disturbing reports of heavily armed teams of federal agents bursting into family homes to arrest individuals with no history or likelihood of violence", and demanded congressional oversight of the prosecutions. When Massie's office was asked their sources for the reports, they responded, "Mr. Roy's office has spoken with attorneys handling these cases and we can't comment any further than that."

==== Emmett Till Antilynching Act ====
Roy, Andrew Clyde and Thomas Massie were the only House members to vote against the Emmett Till Antilynching Act, which passed the 117th United States Congress.

==== 2023 Speaker of the United States House of Representatives elections ====
On January 3, 2023, at the beginning of the 118th Congress, during the election of the speaker of the U.S. House of Representatives, Roy nominated and voted for Byron Donalds for Speaker, in rebuke of House minority leader Kevin McCarthy. Roy became a leader in the negotiation process for the holdouts against McCarthy. Roy and his group of about 20 wanted: (1) to bring down the threshold for calling a vote of no confidence against the speaker to one member, (2) more enforcement to allow more time to read bills, (3) a greater role for the House Freedom Caucus in Republican leadership, requiring Republican leadership to refrain from being involved in primary elections, and (4) an end to U.S. aid to Ukraine. Roy switched his vote to McCarthy on the 12th, 13th, 14th, and 15th ballots.

During the October 2023 speaker election, as the House Republican Conference considered choosing Majority Leader Steve Scalise or Judiciary Committee chair Jim Jordan as their nominee for Speaker, Roy (who supported Jordan) made a proposal that would have required 217 of the 221 members to support the eventual nominee before a floor vote could be held; the idea was tabled 135-88. Jordan was ultimately nominated, and Roy voted for him on the first three floor ballots. On the fourth ballot, Roy, along with all other present Republicans, voted for the new nominee Mike Johnson, who was elected Speaker.

==== Debt ceiling ====
In December 2024, Roy opposed raising the United States debt ceiling. As a result, Donald Trump criticised him and encouraged Texas Republicans to consider a primary challenge.

==== Congressional stock trading ====
On September 3rd, 2025, Roy, along with a bipartisan group of 16 cosponsors introduced the Restore Trust in Congress Act (H.R. 5106) which would ban members of Congress, as well as their spouses and dependents, from owning or trading stocks. The bill had 119 cosponsors as of December 2025.

=== Committee assignments ===
==== Current ====
- Committee on Judiciary
- Committee on Veterans' Affairs

==== Previous ====
- Committee on Oversight and Reform
- Committee on the Budget

=== Caucus memberships ===
- Freedom Caucus
- Republican Study Committee
- Sharia-Free America Caucus (co-founder)

== 2026 Texas Attorney General campaign ==
In 2026, Roy ran for Texas Attorney General, losing the Republican nomination to state senator Mayes Middleton in a runoff.

== Political positions ==
During the 117th Congress, Roy voted with President Joe Biden's stated position 1.8% of the time according to a FiveThirtyEight analysis.

=== Voting rights ===
In January 2025, Rep. Chip Roy (TX-21) reintroduced the Safeguard American Voter Eligibility (SAVE) Act to prevent non-citizens from voting in U.S. elections. This bill was passed in the House of Representatives in 2024, but not in the Senate. Critics point out that provisions in the bill would prevent many married women from registering to vote, as one's name must match one's birth certificate to register. If a discrepancy exists, proof of name change or marriage license would not meet the identification requirements of the bill. Instead, other acceptable documentation, such as a U S. passport, may require a lengthy and/or expensive process to obtain. The net effect of this bill would likely not prevent non-U.S. citizens from voting, which is already illegal, but rather may prevent many women who are U.S. citizens from voting.

=== COVID-19 pandemic ===
On March 13, 2020, Trump declared the COVID-19 pandemic a national emergency, allowing access to billions in aid. The same day, Treasury Secretary Steven Mnuchin and Speaker Nancy Pelosi concluded negotiations for a COVID-19 relief bill. The $2.2 billion measure included funding for free testing for the uninsured, paid sick leave, $1 billion for food aid, and extended unemployment along with other measures to address Americans affected by the pandemic. The next morning, Roy was among the Republican representatives who voted against the bill, calling it "welfare". The bill passed 363–40.

As the pandemic began to spread, Maine governor Janet Mills released an executive order on April 3 calling on out-of-state visitors to self-quarantine for 14 days after entering Maine. This was seen as a response to Mainers, especially in coastal communities, who were complaining that non-residents were trying to escape more crowded urban areas and endangering the community. Mills made a point not to authorize investigating people solely due to out-of-state license plates, so that military or health care workers who had come to the state would not feel harassed. Maine's law enforcement held that the order would be difficult to enforce due to limited staffing and that it was mainly an effort to have neighbors encourage each other to comply with the rules. Cumberland County Sheriff Kevin Joyce told reporters, "If we receive a complaint we will send a deputy to educate the person about the quarantine but trying to build a case or enforce the order is unrealistic."

On April 6, Roy guested on The Mark Levin Show and criticized governors like Mills who had responded forcefully to the pandemic, saying that they were following projections about infections that were mere guesses "not even [based on statistical] models, they are fingers in the air. And they are throwing them out there and they are causing the American people to freak out and panic instead of going through this logically." Roy agreed with Mark Levin that governors in "states who barely have this virus" who were issuing stay-at-home orders were overreacting, saying, "Well, I am glad that there's a number of governors who haven't. …And there was a Maine sheriff today who basically told the Maine governor to pound sand. He is not going to go around and check people when they are driving around the state of Maine. And we need more of that. We need more rational human beings who are going to step back and say 'No, this isn't a police state. This isn't Nazi Germany. This isn't Russia. We are not going to do that. What we're going to do is have common sense discussions on what we can do to make things better.'"

Roy also said that state authorities defining which businesses were essential was a form of tyranny: "I always get entertained or really frankly ticked off at these local county judges and mayors and these little tinpot dictators that are making decisions about peoples' lives when they declare what is and is not an essential business. ..You know what? Any business is essential to its owner and the people who work there. Every single one of them... and all the central planners effectively are deciding how we live our lives."

In May 2020, Roy said, "We need immune systems that are strong. We need immunity systems that can fight this... We need herd immunity." Asked whether acquiring such immunity would entail unnecessary deaths, Roy said that the countrywide stay-at-home orders and attendant delays in accessing cancer screenings or entering into addiction treatment, as well as mental health problems precipitated by unemployment, had increased indirect deaths and suffering.

In July 2020, Roy blamed surging coronavirus cases in Southern Texas on "people coming across our border" from Mexico. At the time, the border with Mexico had been closed for all nonessential activity since March.

In a July 28 appearance with talk show host Steve Deace, Roy suggested that the stay-at-home orders imposed in response to the pandemic were a part of "a fraud being perpetrated on the American people of fear. We are literally, purposely allowing the government...we are purposely causing fear among the American people by virtue of the actions or inactions of our government leaders and then allowing the media to spin up that fear. That is unfortunate and it is costing lives and it's costing economic activity, it's costing jobs and it's costing mental health, and it's frankly undermining our national security and the health of our nation, and frankly I don't think that's accidental. I think that is all about design and all about reclaiming power in November and I think on November fourth there'll be a magic awakening of how we can suddenly beat the virus. …[We need to] start raising a fuss, say 'this is my country. I want my country back, and I want to live healthily and I don't want a bureaucrat government or insurance or otherwise standing between me and my doctor; me and my ability to stay healthy; me and my ability to live free.' And that's what's happening and we need to stop it."

Roy said that Texas was holding COVID-19 cases down; in fact, cases were surging in Texas at the time. Later that month, after Representative Louie Gohmert tested positive for COVID-19, Roy said he did not plan to isolate himself even though he had had a recent maskless interaction with Gohmert on the House floor.

Roy retweeted a comment by Deace on November 13 that said, "We are not going to honor any of these CDC Thanksgiving guidelines, and instead will intentionally violate them all. But thanks." Roy's tweet added, "I will do whatever I want to do on Thanksgiving. Period. #StandUpForAmerica". Two days later, Roy retweeted his earlier tweet and added, "I apologize to the folks who have raised concerns that I said 'I will do whatever I want to do on Thanksgiving. Period.' I should have been more clear, so here it goes: 'I will do whatever I want to do on Thanksgiving … or any other day … Period.'"

On December 23, 2020, Roy joined Trump's opposition to a recently passed $900 billion COVID-19 relief package, saying, "This bill is an irresponsible swamp bill. It is the merger of an omnibus bill that is bloated with typical wasteful spending, on top of a relief bill that has a whole lot of things in it that frankly aren't all that focused on relief. The president's right to call B.S. on this ridiculous bill. Both parties are at fault. …The American people don't just want another check, they want us to do our job like they have to do when they sit around their kitchen table and small businesses have to do when they are trying to make ends meet and America's leadership in Washington refuses to do what they have to do." After Republican leadership pushed back on Trump's claim that the bipartisan legislation was a "disgrace", Trump signed the bill, which was attached to a $1.4 trillion spending measure to keep the government running through September 2021.

On January 12, 2021, the House implemented a rule about wearing masks on the floor, with violators to receive a warning and then fines that would be deducted from their salary and could not be paid out of campaign funds or expense accounts. Roy joined about a dozen Republican House members, led by Marjorie Taylor Greene and including Thomas Massie, Lauren Boebert, Ralph Norman, Beth Van Duyne, Louis Gohmert, and Mary Miller, in a protest against mask wearing in the chamber on May 18, 2021. They positioned themselves in front of C-SPAN cameras, grouping together to take selfies and posting them on Twitter. Despite House Republicans' formal effort to set the rule aside on May 19, 2021, it was kept in place, with the Capitol physician reiterating, "Extra precautions are necessary given the substantial number of partially vaccinated, unvaccinated, and vaccine-indeterminate individuals."

Roy was among the Republican House members reprimanded for not wearing a mask on the House floor. He was warned that additional instances would result in $500 fine (with fines going up to $2,500 thereafter). He did not respond to reporters asking whether he had been vaccinated.

=== Foreign relations ===
Roy was one of three House Republicans to vote "present" on a resolution condemning Trump's action of withdrawing forces from Syria. Along with Matt Gaetz and a handful of Republicans, Roy broke with his party and voted to end Saudi assistance to the War in Yemen.

In March 2021, Roy was one of 14 House Republicans to vote against a measure condemning the Myanmar coup d'état (Paul Gosar voted "present"). After the vote, The Washington Post noted a pattern of a small group of House Republicans, including Roy, who on several occasions "objected to what would seem to most observers as an unobjectionable proposal." It described them as an "emerging far-right 'no' caucus …a consistent cohort of House Republicans who are uniting to constitute much of the minority on measures that otherwise pass overwhelmingly. …[united by] staunchly right-wing politics and, in many cases, a penchant for media attention."

In June 2021, Roy was one of 49 House Republicans to vote to repeal the Authorization for Use of Military Force Against Iraq Resolution of 2002.

In September 2021, Roy was among 75 House Republicans to vote against the National Defense Authorization Act of 2022, which contains a provision that would require women to be drafted.

Roy was among 19 House Republicans to vote against the final passage of the 2022 National Defense Authorization Act.

In July 2022, Roy was one of 18 Republicans to vote against ratifying Sweden's and Finland's applications for NATO membership.

In 2023, Roy was among 47 Republicans to vote in favor of H.Con.Res. 21 which directed President Joe Biden to remove U.S. troops from Syria within 180 days.

In December 2023, Roy introduced legislation to withdraw the United States from the United Nations, titled the "Disengaging Entirely from the United Nations Debacle (DEFUND) Act."

On March 19, 2024, Roy voted NAY to House Resolution 149 Condemning the illegal abduction and forcible transfer of children from Ukraine to the Russian Federation. He was one of nine Republicans to do so.

In August 2025, Roy wrote that he was "Deeply concerned about the incoming flights (...) allegedly filled with folks from Gaza"

=== Hate crimes against Asian Americans ===
During a congressional hearing held in the wake of a mass shooting in Atlanta that killed eight people, including six Asian-American women, Roy questioned whether the committee's attempts to prevent hate crimes and hate incidents against Asian Americans would hamper free speech. His opening statement also included a remark that appeared to advocate lynching: "There are old sayings in Texas about find all the rope in Texas and get a tall oak tree. We take justice very seriously. And we ought to do that. Round up the bad guys." His statements prompted criticism from Democrats, including Representative Grace Meng, who said, "This hearing was to address the hurt and pain of our community, to find solutions. And we will not let you take our voice from us."

After the hearing, Roy declined to apologize and complained about "Chinese Communists who seek to destroy us", while clarifying that he meant that the discussion should focus on "taking out bad guys" instead of addressing issues like hate speech. Texas GOP chair and former Florida congressman Allen West wrote that Roy's remarks "were inappropriate and unfortunate ... While his comments about hanging were dumb, they're not grounds for resignation ... My recommendation to Congressman Chip Roy would be to engage the brain before firing the mouth ... It would avoid embarrassing situations such as this."

On May 18, 2021, Roy was one of 62 Republicans to vote against a bill that ordered the Department of Justice to expedite the review of COVID-19-related hate crimes reported to law enforcement and help establish ways to report indictments online. The bill also directed the Department of Justice to perform public outreach on the issue, and instructed the Attorney General and the Department of Health and Human Services to issue best-practice guidance on how to mitigate racially discriminatory language for describing the pandemic.

Roy explained his opposition before the vote, saying, "We can't legislate away hate. The perspective of many of us is that we don't need new laws, we don't need more committees, and we don't need more bureaucracy. We need to give our police the resources they need to do their job. We need to make sure that we are rooting out crime wherever it may exist between whatever communities it may exist. We need more emphasis on family, more emphasis on community, more emphasis on the Lord Almighty, and less reliance on the federal government to make our communities better. …The concern of many on my side of the aisle is in this continued sordid business of divvying us up on race and focusing on race. We have spent the better part of the last year rightfully concerned, focused, and outraged on what we saw with respect to Mr. Floyd. But we have had a continued focus on race over the last year, and I think one can look at the impact on communities and the impact on Black communities throughout the United States' cities, businesses that have been closed down, and crime sprees that have occurred and wonder what this continued focus on race is doing to better our great nation."

=== Juneteenth ===
Roy was one of 14 Republicans to vote against the Juneteenth National Independence Day Act, which passed, 415–14. The bill recognized as a public holiday a commemoration of June 19, 1865, the day slaves in Galveston, Texas, learned that two and a half years earlier President Abraham Lincoln had issued the Emancipation Proclamation freeing any slave held in rebel states. Roy took issue with the bill's name, saying, "Juneteenth should be commemorated …[but] the holiday should not be called 'Juneteenth National Independence Day' but rather 'Juneteenth National Emancipation (or Freedom or otherwise) Day.' This name needlessly divides our nation on a matter that should instead bring us together by creating a separate Independence Day based on the color of one's skin."

=== Immigration and Islam ===
On June 28, 2019, Roy responded to stories of people being turned away after attempting to donate goods (such as diapers, soaps, sanitary wipes, and toys) to migrant children and families being held by U.S. Customs and Border Protection. The rejection was due to the Antideficiency Act, which mandates that government agencies cannot accept donations or spend any money other than that allocated by Congress. Roy put forward a bill called the Charitable Donations Freedom Act, which would amend the mandate to allow donations of goods. In response to worries that the wording may be too broad and limit Congressional oversight, Roy said he was willing to "work to make sure it's not either too narrow or too broad." On June 28, 2019, the bill was referred to the House Committee on Oversight and Reform.

In a July 2019 hearing on border detention conditions, in order to emphasize that she was telling the truth, Representative Alexandria Ocasio-Cortez asked to be sworn in, taking the role of a witness at a House panel before relating a story about a migrant woman who said she had to drink water from a toilet because her sink broke. In response, Roy accused her of political theatrics and playing to her Twitter followers.

On February 10, 2021, Roy coauthored a letter with 50 other members of Congress criticizing President Joe Biden for refocusing treatment of immigrants under Title 42 health regulations, rather than Title 8, which deals with asylum claims, primarily Homeland Security and Executive Office for Immigration Review matters.

Roy voted against the Fairness for High-Skilled Immigrants Act of 2019 which would amend the Immigration and Nationality Act to eliminate the per-country numerical limitation for employment-based immigrants, to increase the per-country numerical limitation for family-sponsored immigrants, and for other purposes.

Roy voted against the Further Consolidated Appropriations Act of 2020 which authorizes DHS to nearly double the available H-2B visas for the remainder of FY 2020.

Roy voted against Consolidated Appropriations Act (H.R. 1158), which effectively prohibits ICE from cooperating with Health and Human Services to detain or remove illegal alien sponsors of unaccompanied alien children (UACs).

He has received past endorsements from anti-immigration groups such as NumbersUSA and the Federation for American Immigration Reform. Roy has stated that the percentage of the population of the United States in 2024 that is foreign-born is the highest in history. Roy said that this high percentage is a threat to western values, and that the children of immigrants are not being raised to respect the U.S. Constitution and capitalism. In a congressional speech on May 8, 2024 in which Roy warned of the high foreign-born population in the United States, Roy also claimed that there has been a "massive Muslim takeover of the United Kingdom." Roy further said he had "pretty strong concerns about Sharia law and whether that will be forced upon the American people." In October 2025, Roy introduced the "Preserving A Sharia-Free America Act", which would deport foreign nationals who "observe sharia" from the United States. Roy said that sharia represented an "existential threat" to the United States and warned it could lead to "the erosion of the West." In December 2025, Roy co-founded, alongside Keith Self, the congressional Sharia-Free America Caucus, which seeks to ban sharia law. The caucus enrolled 24 members in its first month. In February 2026, the Council on American–Islamic Relations, a civil rights organization, quoted Roy multiple times in a statement designating the Sharia Free America Caucus an anti-Muslim hate group and saying the caucus's agenda "would effectively ban the practice of the world's second largest religion in the United States."

In 2024, Roy defended Trump's plan to "deport 20 million people" if elected president by writing on X that he wanted to "ethnic cleanse" white progressive Democrats by deporting them.

In 2025, Roy proposed legislation called the "PAUSE Act" which would halt all immigration into the United States until "certain objectives" are accomplished.

Following the 2026 Austin bar shooting, Roy again called for halting immigration to the United States, singling out the immigration of Muslims in particular, warning against the "mass migration of Islamists." In an appearance on Newsmax, Roy said "Twenty-five years have passed [since 9/11]. During that time, we have admitted into the United States 5 million people from majority-Muslim countries. Islam is on the march, all in concert with their memorandum from the Muslim Brotherhood." Roy further criticized the building of mosques in Texas, declaring that the "Islamic fight against the West" is a "real war." Roy called for removing Muslims from Texas, posting on X: "No more Muslims. No more criminals. No more Marxists. No more corporatists."

In April 2026, Roy introduced the "Mamdani Act", which would allow for immigrants who have advocated for or are affiliated with socialism, communism, Marxism or Islamic fundamentalism to be subject to deportation, denaturalization, and denial of citizenship or entry; and remove the ability for courts to review any determination made under its provisions. He cited the 2025 election of Zohran Mamdani as mayor of New York City in the bill, having called him an "Islamist Marxist".

=== Gun rights ===
Roy is an outspoken critic of gun control, having made several speeches in support of gun rights. The NRA Political Victory Fund has repeatedly given him an "A" rating and endorsement.

=== Earmarks ===
Roy voiced strong opposition to a March 2021 House Republican secret ballot of 102–84 to return earmarks to internal rules, saying, "It is the currency of corruption in Washington. We shouldn't do it. The Republican party should be ashamed of themselves. …I think we've got $30 trillion in debt and people are tired of the swamp and the GOP should be ashamed of itself, if it jumps headfirst right back into the swamp." He signed and circulated a letter along with 17 other members of his conference promising never to request earmarks for their districts.

=== Antitrust ===
In 2022, Roy was one of 39 Republicans to vote for the Merger Filing Fee Modernization Act of 2022, an antitrust package that would crack down on corporations for anti-competitive behavior.

=== Fiscal Responsibility Act of 2023 ===
Roy was among the 71 Republicans who voted against final passage of the Fiscal Responsibility Act of 2023 in the House.

== Electoral history ==
2018 Republican primary results
Party	Candidate	Votes	%
Republican	Chip Roy	19,319	27.1
Republican	Matt McCall	12,088	16.9
Republican	William Negley	11,088	15.5
Republican	Jason Isaac	7,165	10.0
Republican	Jenifer Sarver	4,001	5.6
Republican	Robert Stovall	3,396	4.7
Republican	Susan Narvaiz	2,710	3.8
Republican	Francisco "Quico" Canseco	2,484	3.5
Republican	Ryan Krause	2,289	3.2
Republican	Al M. Poteet	1,292	1.8
Republican	Peggy Wardlaw	1,281	1.8
Republican	Samuel Temple	1,017	1.4
Republican	Anthony J. White	949	1.3
Republican	Eric Burkhart	719	1.0
Republican	Mauro Garza	657	0.9
Republican	Autry J. Pruitt	454	0.6
Republican	Foster Hagen	392	0.5
Republican	Ivan A. Andarza	95	0.1
Total votes		71,396	100.0

2018 Republican primary runoff results
Party	Candidate	Votes	%
Republican	Chip Roy	17,856	52.6
Republican	Matt McCall	16,081	47.4
Total votes		33,937	100.0

Texas's 21st congressional district, 2018
Party	Candidate	Votes	%
Republican	Chip Roy	177,654	50.3
Democratic	Joseph Kopser	168,421	47.6
Libertarian	Lee Santos	7,542	2.1
Total votes		353,617	100.0
Republican hold			

Texas's 21st congressional district, 2020
Party	Candidate	Votes	%
Republican	Chip Roy	235,740	52.0
Democratic	Wendy Davis	205,780	45.4
Libertarian	Arthur DiBianca	8,666	1.9
Green	Thomas Wakely	3,564	0.8
Total votes		453,750	100.0
Republican hold			

Texas's 21st congressional district, 2022
Party	Candidate	Votes	%
Republican	Chip Roy	207,426	62.8
Democratic	Claudia Zapata	122,655	37.2
Total votes		330,081	100.0
Republican hold			

Texas's 21st congressional district, 2024
Party	Candidate	Votes	%
Republican	Chip Roy (incumbent)	263,744	61.85
Democratic	Kristin Hook	153,765	36.06
Libertarian	Bob King	8,914	2.09
Total votes		426,423	100.00
Republican hold			

== Personal life ==
Roy met his wife, Carrah, at the University of Texas. They have two children. Roy was diagnosed with Hodgkin's lymphoma in 2011.

Roy has said his religious faith informs his political positions, including his opposition to the Equality Act, which he has characterized as trying to prevent his family from being able to "carry out our beliefs without penalty". He has pointed to his generational connection to the Baptist faith, which includes his great-grandfather working as the janitor for the First Baptist Church. Roy is a member of Hyde Park Baptist Church in Austin; the church is part of the Southern Baptists of Texas Convention.

== Notes ==
U.S. House of Representatives
Preceded by Lamar Smith	Member of the U.S. House of Representatives from Texas's 21st congressional district 2019–present	Incumbent
U.S. order of precedence (ceremonial)
Preceded by John Rose	United States representatives by seniority 223rd	Succeeded by Kim Schrier
