= Cupid Shoot Me =

Studio album by Remi Nicole
- Released: (United Kingdom) 31 August 2009
- Recorded: 2007–2009
- Label: Island
- Producer: Cisco Adler

Remi Nicole chronology
My Conscience and I (2007)	Cupid Shoot Me (2009)

Cupid Shoot Me is the second album by Remi Nicole, released in the UK on 31 August. The album was produced by Grammy-winning producer Mark Taylor, who has worked with Rod Stewart, Tina Turner and Diana Ross, as well as Britney Spears, Kylie Minogue and Nelly Furtado.

The album is a mixture of styles ranging from doo wop to rockabilly, girl-group to soulful rock. Nicole describes it as an album about "not being in love", and says that "It’s like a fairy tale. There’s something quite enchanted about it.". She wrote all 11 songs on the album, and performed the vocals, guitar, keyboards, and drums for the record. The first single from the album will be Standing Tears Apart, released on 24 August.

== Track listing ==
1. Cupid Shoot Me
2. In My Dreams
3. Nice Boy
4. Loveless
5. Another Day
6. Broke Hearted People
7. Standing Tears Apart
8. Come Find Me
9. Going It Alone
10. I'll Be Waiting
11. Love Me So
12. I Don't Know How

The rear sleeve of the album features the song titles linked together to form a summary of the story of the album: "CUPID SHOOT ME because IN MY DREAMS there was a NICE BOY who was LOVELESS. He told me that on ANOTHER DAY there would be many BROKEN HEARTED PEOPLE all STANDING TEARS APART. He said COME FIND ME, I’m fed up of GOING IT ALONE so I’LL BE WAITING for you to come and LOVE ME SO."

== Singles ==
1. Standing Tears Apart – 24 August 2009 (Island)
