= Sharia-Free America Caucus =

Congressional caucus opposing sharia law

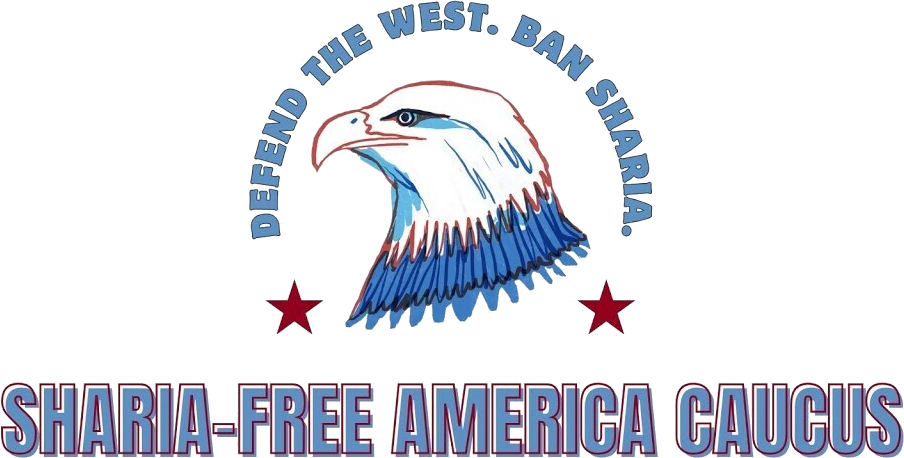
- Co-chairs: Chip Roy (TX–21); Keith Self (TX–3)
- Founded: December 18, 2025; 10 months ago
- Ideology: Anti-sharia law
- Seats in the House Republican Conference: 66 / 219
- Seats in the House: 66 / 435

The Sharia-Free America Caucus is a caucus in the United States House of Representatives that opposes sharia law. Founded in 2025 by U.S. representatives Chip Roy and Keith Self, the caucus has at least 66 members, all of whom are Republicans.

== History ==
The Sharia-Free America Caucus was founded on December 18, 2025, by U.S. representatives Chip Roy and Keith Self. As of 2026, the caucus has at least 66 members, all of whom are members of the Republican Party.

The caucus have introduced a number of bills, including one that would designate the Council on American–Islamic Relations (CAIR) as a terrorist organization. The group also introduced H.R. 6225, which would immediately halt all immigration to the United States pending further reforms to immigration law.

== Reception ==
In February 2026, the Council on American–Islamic Relations announced they were designating the caucus an "anti-Muslim hate group". CAIR suggested that the caucus were attempting to pass legislation to criminalize Islam. Both the American-Arab Anti-Discrimination Committee and the U.S. Council of Muslim Organizations have expressed opposition to the caucus.

On June 8, 2026, 119 congressional Democrats issued a letter condemning the caucus, which they labelled Islamophobic.

== See also ==
- Freedom Caucus
