= Rock&Roll (band) =

French indie rock band

- Origin: Paris, France
- Genres: Indie rock Post-punk revival
- Years active: 2005–2009
- Labels: Steady Go! Coming Soon Records
- Members: Gricha Berekachvili (vocals/guitar); Matthias Cadéac d'Arbaud (vocals/guitar); L.A.M.F. (bass guitar); Paul Louis Viguier2005-2008; Guillaume Rossel 2008-2009(drums)

Rock&Roll is an indie rock band from Paris, France, formed in June 2005. The band is made up of singer Gricha Berekachvili, drummer Paul Louis Viguier, bassist L.A.M.F, guitarist Matthias Cadeac d'Arbaud and tambourine man Vincent-John Soimaud.

== Background ==
In 2006, the band released their first EP, First Class Plane. The cover was shot by Chanel designer, Karl Lagerfeld. In 2006, Les Inrockuptibles, a French rock music publication equivalent to Rolling Stone, elected them Best New Band of 2006 from a pool of roughly 7000 contestants.

The band was signed in January 2007 to David Sonenberg's management company after gigs in New York City. Then the band toured twice the United States. In September 2007, they released their second EP album entitled Losers, Boozers, Jacuzzi Users. The music video for the title track of the EP was directed by SKINNY.

Roberto Cavalli hired them as models to be the face of his Spring 2008 line. Additionally, the band has just finished shooting an episode of The Hills, in which they will gueststar as themselves. This episode is slated to air in 2008.

Viguier was replaced by drummer Guillaume Rossel in March 2008. In July 2008, the band recorded with producer Stepehen Hague (New Order, Pet Shop Boys, Blur) the single "You're Not Worth My Song", which became the official music of French TV channel Orange Sports.

In March 2009, the band split up. Singer/guitarist Berekachvili and drummer Rossel are currently working on two new projects together: one folk-country band called Russian Roulettes and a rock project called One+One.
