= Remi Nicole =

Remi Nicole Wilson
- Also known as: Remi Nicole
- Born: 6 April 1983 (age 42)
- Genres: Indie pop
- Occupations: Musician, songwriter, actress
- Instruments: Vocals, guitar, drums
- Years active: 2006–present
- Labels: Island Records
- Website: Official Website

Remi Nicole Wilson (born 6 April 1983), better known as Remi Nicole, is a British singer-songwriter and actress who was born in North London, but now resides in Los Angeles. She is best known for her single "Go Mr Sunshine", which was released in 2007. Her debut album, My Conscience and I, was released later that year and her second, Cupid Shoot Me, on 31 August 2009. As an actress she is credited as Remi Wilson.

== Background ==
Nicole has a mixed background of Afro-Trinidadian, Austrian and Jewish heritage and has lived in Holloway, Islington, Highgate, Finsbury Park, Tufnell Park and Highbury.

She trained as an actress at Birmingham School of Speech and Drama, graduating in 2004.

== Acting career ==
Wilson's stage credits include Two Step, a play by Rashan Stone (2004); Playboy of the West Indies (2004); and Promises and Lies, the UB40 jukebox musical (2006).

She was also a regular cast member in the first series of Hyperdrive, playing the role of Cadet Piretti.

== Music career ==
Nicole started performing officially in October 2006, and gained recognition in the UK after her song "Go Mr Sunshine" was first played on BBC Radio 1 in August 2007.

She signed her first record deal in late 2006 with Island Records, and released her first single, "Fed Up", in May 2007. This was followed by the single "Go Mr Sunshine", which was released for download on 13 August 2007, and was officially released on 20 August. It reached number 57 in the UK Singles Chart. The album My Conscience and I was released on 3 December 2007. Also in December, her cover of the song "Teenage Kicks" was featured in the film St Trinian's and on the film's soundtrack.

Nicole's second album, Cupid Shoot Me, was released on 31 August 2009. Nicole has called the album her "real debut", saying of My Conscience and I, "I feel like that was an album of demos". She wrote all 11 tracks on the album, which she described as being an album about "not being in love". The first single to be released from the album was "Standing Tears Apart" on the 24 August.

In 2022, her single "Welcome to My World" (a Jim Reeves cover) was used in the Open Up advertising campaign for the DIY/home retailer Wickes, which was launched during the advert break in the Channel 4 programme Gogglebox on 25 March 2022.

== TV appearances ==
Nicole has appeared on TV many times mainly on E4 and Channel 4 on the show Freshly Squeezed, where she has assisted Nick Grimshaw in presenting the show.

She has performed her music at T4 on the Beach and at Glastonbury Festival. She recorded a performance of "Standing Tears Apart" for the Channel 4 show Intros.

== Discography ==
=== Albums ===
- 2007 My Conscience and I
- 2009 Cupid Shoot Me

=== Singles ===
- "Fed Up" (May 2007)
- "Go Mr Sunshine" (13 August 2007) UK #57
- "Rock 'n' Roll" (5 November 2007)
- "Lights Out" (March 2008)
- "Standing Tears Apart" (24 August 2009)
- "Welcome to My World" (March 2022)
