= My Conscience and I =

Studio album by Remi Nicole
- Released: December 3, 2007
- Recorded: 2006–2007
- Length: 51:18
- Label: Universal Motown
- Producer: Remi Nicole

Remi Nicole chronology
My Conscience and I (2007)	Cupid Shoot Me (2009)

Professional ratings
Aggregate scores
Source	Rating
Metacritic	46/100
Review scores
Source	Rating
Dotmusic	3/10
Drowned in Sound	2/10
God Is in the TV	0.5/5 stars
The Guardian	2/5 stars
The Irish Times	3/5 stars
musicOMH	3/5 stars
NME	3/10
The Observer	3/5 stars
Q	4/5 stars
Uncut	2/10

My Conscience and I is the debut album by Remi Nicole, released in the UK on December 3, 2007, on the Universal label.

== Track listing ==
1. Go With The Flow 4:03
2. Rock 'n' Roll 3:56
3. New Old Days 5:13
4. Fed Up (album version) 3:45
5. Na Nighty 3:08
6. Lights Out 5:57
7. Tabloid Queen 4:12
8. Right Side Of Me 5:09
9. Go Mr. Sunshine (album version) 4:23
10. Soulback 3:02
11. Dates From Hell 3:52
12. Inside Of Me 6:47

== Singles ==
1. "Fed Up" 14 May 2007 (Island)
2. "Go Mr Sunshine" 20 Aug 2007 (Island) UK Top 100 - #57
3. "Rock 'n' Roll" 26 Nov 2007 (Island)
4. “Lights Out” March 2008 (Island)
