= Fed Up! (book) =

2010 book by Rick Perry

Fed Up! Our Fight to Save America from Washington
- Author: Rick Perry
- Language: English
- Subject: States' rights
- Publisher: Little, Brown and Company
- Publication date: 2010
- Publication place: United States
- Media type: Print
- Pages: 220
- ISBN: 978-0-316-13295-4

Fed Up! Our Fight to Save America from Washington is a 2010 political non-fiction book authored by then Governor of Texas Rick Perry and his senior advisor Chip Roy, published by Little, Brown and Company. It was released shortly after Perry's re-election to a third term as governor. The book analyzes states' rights and the growing role of the federal government, demonstrating Perry's support for federalism. In the book, he argues that state sovereignty was dominant at the founding of the United States, but was lost through time as the federal government overreached through excessive spending, over-taxation and over-regulation. Perry feels that this has led to frustration among the populace, which gave rise to the Tea Party movement. The book charts a course to end the growth of the federal government.

While the book takes aim at the political culture in Washington, D.C., it also promotes the concept of American exceptionalism, particularly in the view that the American people are "fed up" with the nation not realizing its true potential.

== Background ==
Perry decided to write the book in 2009 after attending three Tea Party events in one day. He found "people who were really scared for the first time in their lives that their government was so out of touch with them". In May 2010, after Perry secured the Texas gubernatorial nomination of the Republican Party against Senator Kay Bailey Hutchison, Little, Brown and Company revealed that Perry had signed a deal to write a book in support of the Tenth Amendment to the United States Constitution, specifically in opposition to the role of the federal government at the expense of the states and the people. A press release from the publishing company stated that the book would focus on "how an increasing concentration of power in Washington will lead to further unsustainable debt, greater limits on opportunity and success, and a permanent dependency class—adding up to a potentially failed nation." The Dallas Morning News reported that the book would largely reflect the issues used by Perry to successfully defeat Hutchison, especially his criticism of her support for deficit spending and the stimulus packages. Spokesman Mark Miner commented that Perry was passionate about the issues raised in the book. The press release quoted Perry as saying the "future of the nation" is at risk, but that he's "convinced that the burgeoning grass-roots energy and widespread concern can restore balance to our system and invigorate our nation in the decades to come. It's the governors from both parties who must lead this fight."

After the news, the campaign for Democratic gubernatorial nominee Bill White attacked Perry for accepting stimulus funds and for writing a book to "raise his national profile" rather than dealing with the problems in the state. Miner disputed the claim and argued that the governor could "multitask". Jim Hornfischer, the literary agent for Perry, explained that the governor would receive help from one or two researchers and that the book would be short.

After Perry's re-election as governor, the book was released on November 15, 2010.

== Content ==
The book begins with a foreword by former House Speaker Newt Gingrich. He defends the governorship of Perry, and argues that the state of Texas is better off economically than others because of the lack of a state income tax. He also defends his own Contract with America, which he credits with helping to balance the federal budget in the late 1990s. In the preface, Perry describes his humble beginnings and explains his "vantage point" for writing the book as a governor of Texas for nearly a decade. He writes:

I wrote this book because I believe that America is great but also that America is in trouble—and heading for a cliff if we don't take immediate steps to change course. I wrote this book in the hopes that it will lead to a new conversation about the proper role of government in our lives

The first chapter, titled "America Is Great, Washington Is Broken" explains the logic of why state sovereignty, particularly in empowerment of the individual, is important and was part of the founders' vision. It also provides statistics to back the claim that the federal government expanded its role in the recent years, and defends the concept of American exceptionalism, arguing that America is "worth saving". The next chapter titled "Why States Matter" goes back into the early history of the United States, explaining how the American colonists were "fed up" with the faraway government in England. It also describes the American tradition of federalism from the standpoint of the Federalist Papers, and the reasoning behind the adoption of the Tenth Amendment. It then provides a contemporary account, explaining that the morals of individuals vary between different states, which allows individuals to vote with their feet. Perry says that while Massachusetts "passed state-run health care...[and] sanctioned gay marriage...[Texans] limit regulations, keep taxes low, leave marriage between a man and a woman, and let our citizens choose their own health care plan". He then explains that states can be laboratories to see which policies work and which do not.

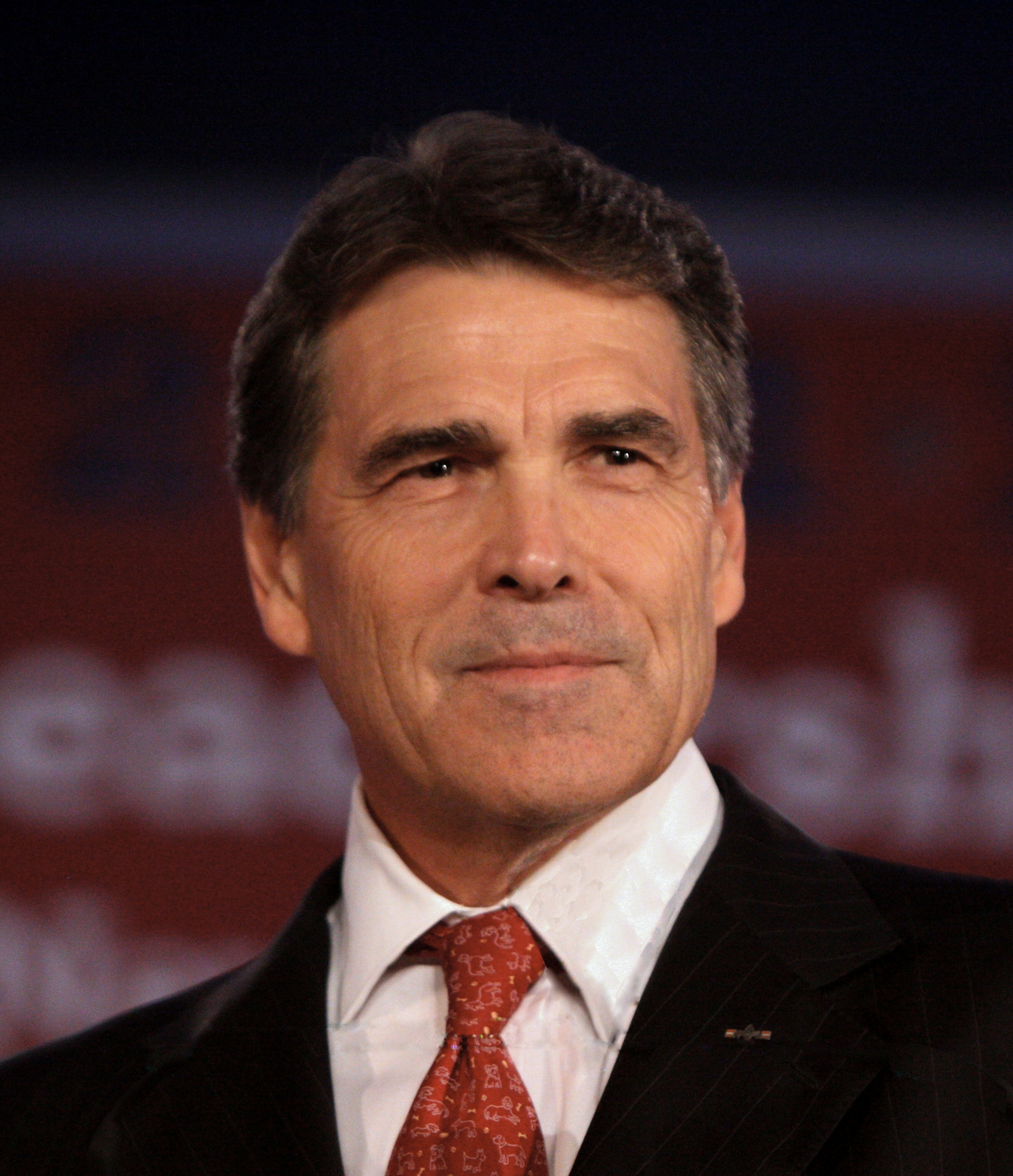
Perry in 2011

In the next section, Perry discusses slavery and argues that such legislation as the Fugitive Slave Act of 1850 and the Supreme Court decision in Dred Scott v. Sandford were assaults on the states' rights of the northern states. He comments that the American Civil War was inevitable and that the Thirteenth, Fourteenth and Fifteenth amendments along with the Civil Rights Act were all necessary for individual rights. However, in the next chapter titled "What Happened to the Founders' Vision", Perry argues that the federal government grew too powerful during the Progressive Era and cites the Sixteenth and Seventeenth amendments as an attack on states' rights. Further, he feels that the New Deal policies of President Franklin Roosevelt created a "massive federal government" and welfare state. He argues that it did not end the Great Depression, which instead was settled by World War II. Perry finds that later presidents such as Lyndon Johnson felt the New Deal worked and initiated their own spending programs like the Great Society. He argues that Presidents and Congress have overly been broad in their interpretation of the Commerce Clause.

The next chapter, titled "Washington Is Bankrupting America", Perry goes in-depth about the debt situation in the United States, railing against earmarks and entitlement spending, particularly Social Security. He explains that recent overspending, starting under President George W. Bush for temporary relief, became the primary policy of Barack Obama, and is actually preventing recession recovery and economic freedom. In the next chapter, "No American Left Alone", Perry details the growing bureaucracy in the federal government, which he feels is overreaching. He explicitly denounces "Obamacare", the Patient Protection and Affordable Care Act, as an unconstitutional intrusion, and derides the No Child Left Behind Act and the Environmental Protection Agency.

The sixth chapter, titled "Nine Unelected Judges Tell Us How to Live", examines the Supreme Court of the United States and how some of its decisions have taken away the right of states to legislate, particularly on criminal law, religious expression in public, gun law, abortion, marriage and race-based law. He argues that many of the justices are activists, making policy on their own rather than interpreting the Constitution. He finds this to be troubling since justices are unelected and appointed for life. He calls for two constitutional amendments to remedy this—one that would abolish lifetime appointments for judges, and another to give Congress the power to override Supreme Court decisions by a two-thirds majority from both the Senate and the House of Representatives. The next chapter, "The Federal Government Fiddles" argues that the federal government is too busy involving itself in the business of the states, causing it to abandon its Constitutionally-mandated responsibilities. He cites as evidence, the federal government's failure to secure the southern border with Mexico and the issue of illegal immigration. He defends the right of states such as Arizona to pass immigration laws in the absence of the federal government. Further, he criticizes the lack of innovation in the military, and identifies the scrapping of missile defense and the space program as a chance for other nations to catch up. He expresses that stagnation and excess in the intelligence and counterterrorism communities causes the nation to be less safe.

In the chapter, "Standing Athwart History", Perry makes the case that the Democratic Party is not the party of the people as it once was, and explains that he left the party in 1989 because it became the party of government. He argues that Democrats are increasing the size of the federal government as some Republicans help and others stand by and call for them to stop. He lists the 1980 election of Ronald Reagan, the 1994 Republican Revolution and the 2000 election of Bush as paramount moments for the conservative cause that were squandered, especially in the case of Bush. He compliments Bush for his leadership in the war on terror, but criticizes him for his economic policies. Perry sees promise for conservatives in the Tea Party movement to reverse the growth of the federal government. The next chapter, titled "The States do the Work of the People", Perry describes how the Federal Emergency Management Agency got in the way of states following Hurricane Katrina. He compares the tax burden of citizens to the federal government to that of the states, and finds that states use the revenue more efficiently. Moreover, he says that states have a right to "push back" against the federal government in court. He cites California's legalization of medicinal marijuana. He also defends his decision not to accept stimulus money in order to prevent the federal encroachment from the strings attached.

In final chapter, "Retaking the Reins of Government", Perry begins with a detailed account of an idyllic world in 2026, on the 250th anniversary of the signing of the Declaration of Independence. He describes it as a "world where people are free and government is minimalized, and as a result we live in prosperity according to our own hard work". In order to attain this world, Perry lists five goals:

1. "Repeal Obamacare"
2. "Stand Up and Lead"
3. "Sustain a National Dialogue About Limited, Constitutional Government"
4. "Elect Leaders Who Respect the Constitution and Hold Them Accountable"
5. "Adopt Certain Important Structural Reforms"

The book concludes with an author's note from Perry, who states that the Texas Public Policy Foundation will lead a national discussion on the issue of federalism and will receive the net proceeds of Perry from the sale of the book.

== Reception ==
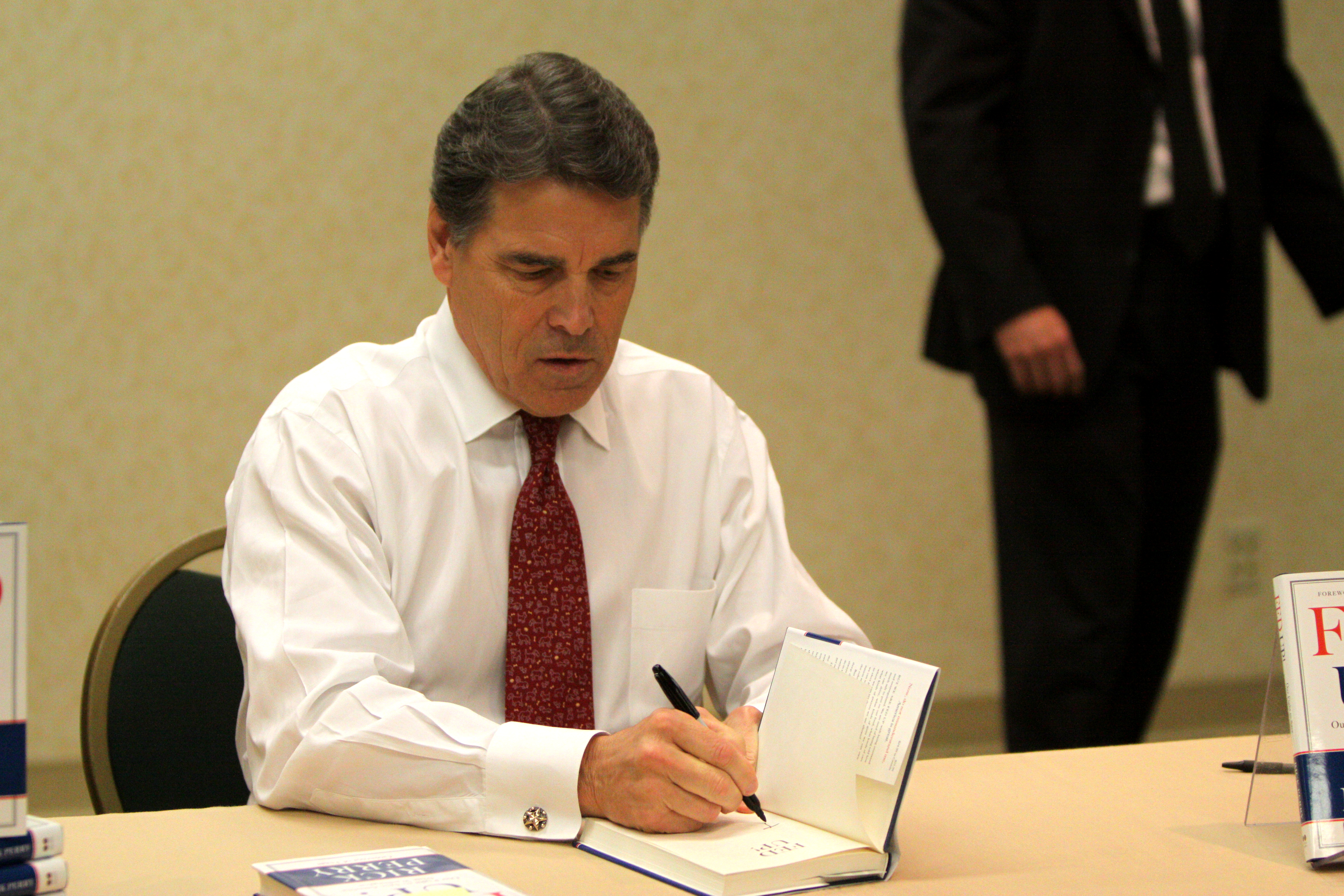
Perry at a book signing event

Before the book's release and ahead of the gubernatorial election, excerpts were placed on the website of Little, Brown and Company publishing. Democratic candidate Bill White used the excerpts to criticize Perry, particularly a passage where Perry compared Social Security to a Ponzi scheme. After the book's release and Perry's victory in the election, he embarked on a nationwide tour to promote the book, appearing on such shows as The Today Show, Fox and Friends, NPR, Glenn Beck's radio show and The Daily Show.

The New York Times described the book as "a Tea Party manifesto", and remarked that its content and Perry's promotional tour suggested that he had presidential ambitions for 2012. Perry stated in an interview with the Associated Press that the book's anti-Washington sentiment was evidence that he was not running for president; however, he later declared his candidacy for the 2012 Republican nomination.

Since declaring his candidacy for the 2012 Republican nomination, Perry has distanced himself from some of the claims made in Fed Up!. In particular, Perry attacked social security in the book, suggesting it was unconstitutional and should be privatized. However, since joining the Presidential race, the communications director for the Perry camp, Ray Sullivan, has claimed that the book "is not meant to reflect the governor's current views" on social security reform and that Sullivan has "never heard" Perry "suggest the program was unconstitutional".
