= The Rocking Carol =

Christmas carol

- by Percy Dearmer
- Genre: Christmas carol
- Language: English, based on Czech
- Based on: Traditional Czech carol
- Published: 1928

"The Rocking Carol", also known as "Little Jesus, Sweetly Sleep" and "Rocking", is an English Christmas carol by Percy Dearmer. It was translated from Czech ("Hajej, nynej, Ježíšku") in 1928 and is performed as a lullaby to the baby Jesus.

== History ==
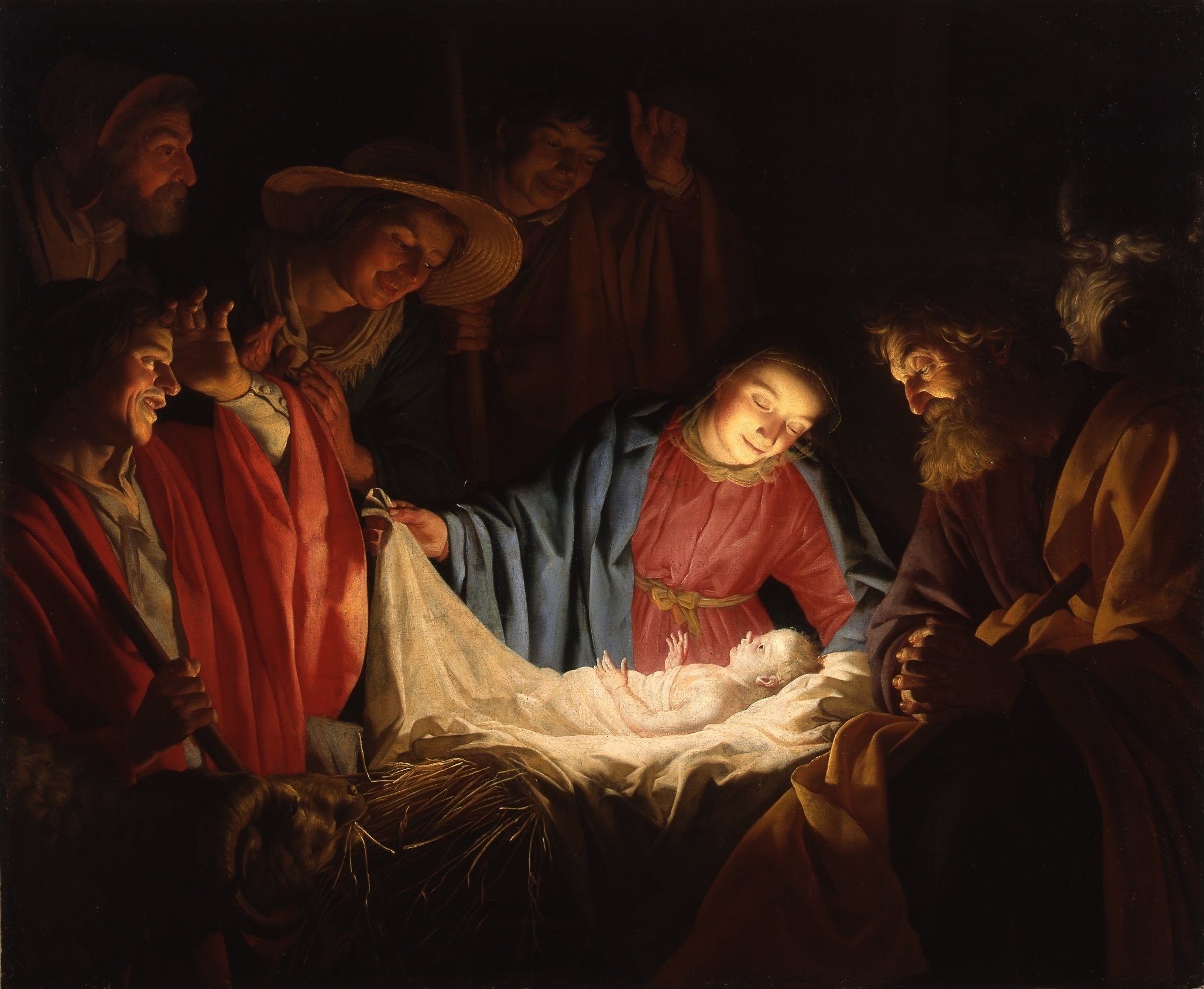
Adoration of the Shepherds by Gerard van Honthorst

The carol was first published in an anthology in 1920 in Czechoslovakia, where it was described as a traditional Czech carol. It was loosely translated into English by Percy Dearmer, as part of his effort of resurrecting hymns that had fallen into disuse and introducing European hymns into the Church of England. The carol is sung in the form of a lullaby to Jesus while rocking the manger as if it were a more modern cradle, as noted by the repetitive chorus of "We will rock you". It was first published in The Oxford Book of Carols, which Dearmer had edited alongside Martin Shaw and Ralph Vaughan Williams, in 1928.

After initial publication, the carol gradually decreased in popularity until the 1960s when the English actress Julie Andrews performed a commercially released version of it. Following this, it was published in Carols for Choirs by Reginald Jacques and David Willcocks.

== Description ==
"The Rocking Carol" consists of two verses of eight lines each. It is performed with a 10.7.8.8.7.7 metre. The hymn continues to be published within Church of England and Anglican hymnals. The hymn has been described as the quintessential lullaby carol and compared with similarly worded Christmas carols, "Silent Night" and "Away in a Manger"; hymnologists opine that the lyrics and melody both strongly suggest the rocking of a cradle.

== Melody and words ==
The original Czech lyrics are:

1. Hajej, nynej, Ježíšku,
Ježíšku, pučíme ti kožíšku.
Budeme té kolíbati,
Abys moh' libě pospati,
Hajej, nynej, Ježíšku,
Pučíme ti kožíšku.

2. Hajej, nynej, miláčku,
Miláčku, mariánský synáčku.
Budeme té kolíbati,
Abys moh' libě pospati,
Hajej, nynej, miláčku,
Mariánský synáčku.

The English words are a poetic translation.

== Criticism ==
After publication, the final line of the carol met with dissatisfaction, with a number of hymnal editors altering it from "Darling, darling little man" to "Son of God and Son of Man". Barry Cooper has argued that it has only minor biblical references and is written without theological content and "painting a wholly imaginary scene".
