= Queen of Pop (disambiguation) =

Queen of Pop is a nickname most commonly associated with American singer Madonna.

Queen of Pop may also refer to:

- Several other musicians, see honorific nicknames in popular music
- Queen of Pop (album), a 2000 album by Marcia Hines
- "Queen of Pop," an annual award given out at the Australian pop music awards

== See also ==
- Queen of Hip-Pop, a 2005 album by Namie Amuro
- Queen Of Pop, a 2015 album by Joanne Prada
- Queen of Soul (disambiguation)
- Queen of Rock (disambiguation)
