= Weather Forecasting Improvement Act of 2013 =

- Long title: To prioritize and redirect NOAA resources to a focused program of investment on near-term, affordable, and attainable advances in observational, computing, and modeling capabilities to deliver substantial improvement in weather forecasting and prediction of high impact weather events, such as tornadoes and hurricanes, and for other purposes.
- Announced in: the 113th United States Congress
- Sponsored by: Rep. Jim Bridenstine (R, OK-1)
- Number of co-sponsors: 3

Codification
- U.S.C. sections affected: 51 U.S.C. § 60161
- Agencies affected: National Science Foundation, National Oceanic and Atmospheric Administration, United States Congress
- Authorizations of appropriations: $569,500,000

Legislative history
- Introduced in the House as H.R. 2413 by Rep. Jim Bridenstine (R, OK-1) on June 18, 2013; Committee consideration by United States House Committee on Science, Space and Technology, United States House Science Subcommittee on Environment

The Weather Forecasting Improvement Act of 2013 (H.R. 2413) was a bill that intended to authorize appropriations over the 2014-2017 period for the National Oceanic and Atmospheric Administration (NOAA) to improve forecasting of severe weather events. The bill also sought to authorize NOAA to carry out various other activities related to weather forecasting and research.

The bill was introduced in the United States House of Representatives during the 113th United States Congress.

== Background ==
"Severe weather" refers to any dangerous meteorological phenomena with the potential to cause damage, serious social disruption, or loss of human life. Types of severe weather phenomena vary, depending on the latitude, altitude, topography, and atmospheric conditions. High winds, hail, excessive precipitation, and wildfires are forms and effects of severe weather, as are thunderstorms, downbursts, lightning, tornadoes, waterspouts, tropical cyclones, and extratropical cyclones. Regional and seasonal severe weather phenomena include blizzards, snowstorms, ice storms, and duststorms.

== Provisions of the bill ==
This summary is based largely on the summary provided by the Congressional Research Service, a public domain source.

The Weather Forecasting Improvement Act of 2013 meant to require the Under Secretary of Commerce for Oceans and Atmosphere (and also the Administrator of the National Oceanic and Atmosphere Administration [NOAA]) to make certain weather-related activities concerning public safety and the national economy the top priority in the planning and management of programs within all relevant NOAA line offices.

Had it been enacted, it would have directed the Assistant Administrator of the Office of Oceanic and Atmospheric Research (OAR) to: (1) undertake a program to develop an improved understanding of forecast capabilities for atmospheric events; (2) establish a tornado warning extension program; and (3) issue a plan for restoring U.S. leadership in weather modeling, prediction, and forecasting. The Under Secretary would have been required to: (1) develop a prioritized list of observation data requirements necessary to ensure weather forecasting capabilities to protect life and property; (2) undertake ongoing systematic evaluations of observing systems, data, and information needed to meet the requirements developed under such priority list; (3) identify current and potential future data gaps in observing capabilities related to such requirements; and (4) determine a range of options to address the gaps identified. The OAR Assistant Administrator would have been instructed to undertake Observing System Simulation Experiments (OSSEs) to assess the relative value and benefits of observing capabilities and systems. Allows technical and scientific OSSE evaluations to include assessments of the impact of observing capabilities on global weather prediction, hurricane track and intensity forecasting, tornado warning times and accuracy, and prediction of mid-latitude severe local storm outbreaks.

OSSEs would have been required to determine the potential impact of proposed space-based, sub-orbital, and in-situ observing systems on analyses and forecasts; to evaluate and compare observing system design options; and to assess the relative capabilities and costs of various and combinations of observing systems in providing data necessary for the protection of life and property. Conducting an OSSE would have been required before the acquisition of major government-owned or government-leased operational observing systems, before the purchase of new commercially provided data critical to forecast accuracy, and for any existing commercially provided observing system data contracts exceeding $15 million. Permits OSSEs to be conducted on existing observing systems where such data costs NOAA in excess of $20 million.

== Procedural history ==
The Weather Forecasting Improvement Act of 2013 was introduced into the United States House of Representatives on June 18, 2013 by Republican Jim Bridenstine of Oklahoma's 1st congressional district. It was referred to the United States House Committee on Science, Space and Technology and the United States House Science Subcommittee on Environment. On December 5, 2013, it was ordered to be reported in the nature of a substitute (amended) by a voice vote of the Science Committee. On March 21, 2014, it was reported (amended) alongside House Report 113-383.

== Debate and discussion ==
The bill's sponsor Rep. Bridenstine introduced the bill in response to several 2013 Oklahoma tornadoes. Bridenstine said that "my state has seen all too many times the destructive power of tornadoes and severe weather. In the wake of the latest outbreak in May that cost 48 lives, it is painfully clear that we must do more." Bridenstine noted that he believed more money should be spent on weather forecasting instead of climate change.

According to Republican Chairman of the Environment Subcommittee Chris Stewart, the bill "prioritizes protection of public safety and forward-looking weather research, improves procurement of observing system data from space, air, and land, and opens up NOAA's process to encourage private sector weather solutions."

When it was introduced, the bill only had Republican support, although at least seven Democrats later became co-sponsors, in part due to language changes from the committee stage.

According to liberal blog Think Progress, "both sides agree that increased funding for weather forecasting research is critical, but Democrats criticized Republican plans to take money away from climate change research, which already contributes to weather prediction capabilities."

== See also ==
- List of bills in the 113th United States Congress
- Weather forecasting
- Global Forecast System
- Climate change in the United States
- Climate change policy of the United States
