= United States House Science Subcommittee on Space and Aeronautics =

Subcommittee of Committee on Science, Space, and Technology
- Active United States House of Representatives; 119th Congress

Leadership
- Chair: Mike Haridopolos (R)
- Ranking Member: Valerie Foushee (D)

Structure
- Seats: 12 (12 currently filled) 7/7 5/5
- Political parties: Majority (7): Republican (7); Minority (5): Democratic (5)

Meeting place
- 2321, Rayburn House Office Building; Washington, D.C. 20515

Phone number
- (202)-225-6371

The Science Subcommittee on Space and Aeronautics is one of five subcommittees of the United States House Committee on Science and Technology.

== Jurisdiction ==
The subcommittee has legislative jurisdiction and general and special oversight and investigative authority on all matters relating to astronautical and aeronautical research and development including:

- national space policy, including access to space;
- sub-orbital access and applications;
- National Aeronautics and Space Administration and its contractor and government-operated laboratories;
- space commercialization, including the commercial space activities relating to the Department of Transportation and the Department of Commerce;
- exploration and use of outer space;
- international space cooperation;
- National Space Council;
- space applications, space communications and related matters;
- Earth remote sensing policy;
- civil aviation research, development, and demonstration;
- research, development, and demonstration programs of the Federal Aviation Administration; and
- space law.

== History ==
Chairs of the subcommittee:

- Dana Rohrabacher (R), California, 1997-2005
- Ken Calvert (R), California, 2005-2007
- Mark Udall (D), Colorado, 2007-2009
- Gabby Giffords (D), Arizona, 2009-2011
- Steven Palazzo (R), Mississippi, 2011–2015
- Brian Babin (R), Texas 2015-2019, 2023-present
- Kendra Horn (D), Oklahoma, 2019-2021
- Don Beyer (D), Virginia, 2021-2023
- Brian Babin (R), Texas, 2023–2025
- Mike Haridopolos (R), Florida, 2025–present

== Members, 119th Congress ==
Majority	Minority
Mike Haridopolos, Florida, Chair; Dan Webster, Florida; Rich McCormick, Georgia; Mike Collins, Georgia; Vince Fong, California; Keith Self, Texas; Mike Kennedy, Utah	Valerie Foushee, North Carolina, Ranking Member; Laura Gillen, New York; George T. Whitesides, California; Haley Stevens, Michigan; Andrea Salinas, Oregon
Ex officio
Brian Babin, Texas	Zoe Lofgren, California

== Historical membership rosters ==
=== 115th Congress ===
Majority	Minority
Brian Babin, Texas Chairman; Mo Brooks, Alabama Vice Chair; Dana Rohrabacher, California; Frank Lucas, Oklahoma; Bill Posey, Florida; Steve Knight, California; Barbara Comstock, Virginia; Ralph Abraham, Louisiana; Daniel Webster, Florida; Jim Banks, Indiana; Andy Biggs, Arizona; Neal Dunn, Florida; Clay Higgins, Louisiana	Ami Bera, California, Ranking Member; Zoe Lofgren, California; Don Beyer, Virginia; Marc Veasey, Texas; Daniel Lipinski, Illinois; Ed Perlmutter, Colorado; Charlie Crist, Florida; Bill Foster, Illinois; Conor Lamb, Pennsylvania
Ex officio
Lamar S. Smith, Texas	Eddie Bernice Johnson, Texas

=== 116th Congress ===
Majority	Minority
Kendra Horn, Oklahoma, Chair; Zoe Lofgren, California; Ami Bera, California; Ed Perlmutter, Colorado; Don Beyer, Virginia; Charlie Crist, Florida; Katie Hill, California; Jennifer Wexton, Virginia	Brian Babin, Texas, Ranking Member; Mo Brooks, Alabama; Bill Posey, Florida; Pete Olson, Texas; Mike Waltz, Florida
Ex officio
Eddie Bernice Johnson, Texas	Frank Lucas, Oklahoma

=== 117th Congress ===
Majority	Minority
Don Beyer, Virginia, Chair; Zoe Lofgren, California; Ami Bera, California; Brad Sherman, California; Ed Perlmutter, Colorado; Charlie Crist, Florida; Donald Norcross, New Jersey	Brian Babin, Texas, Ranking Member; Mo Brooks, Alabama; Bill Posey, Florida; Dan Webster, Florida; Young Kim, California
Ex officio
Eddie Bernice Johnson, Texas	Frank Lucas, Oklahoma

=== 118th Congress ===
Majority	Minority
Brian Babin, Texas, Chair; Bill Posey, Florida; Dan Webster, Florida; Mike Garcia, California; Darrell Issa, California; Dale Strong, Alabama; Rich McCormick, Georgia	Eric Sorensen, Illinois, Ranking Member; Jeff Jackson, North Carolina; Yadira Caraveo, Colorado; Jamaal Bowman, New York; Jennifer McClellan, Virginia
Ex officio
Frank Lucas, Oklahoma	Zoe Lofgren, California

== See also ==
- United States Senate Commerce Subcommittee on Science and Space
