= United States House Science Subcommittee on Environment =

Subcommittee of Committee on Science, Space, and Technology
- Active United States House of Representatives; 119th Congress

Leadership
- Chair: Scott Franklin (R)
- Ranking Member: Gabe Amo (D)

Structure
- Seats: 8 (8 currently filled) 5/5 3/3
- Political parties: Majority (5): Republican (5); Minority (3): Democratic (3)

Meeting place
- 2321, Rayburn House Office Building; Washington, D.C. 20515

Phone number
- (202)-225-6371

The Science Subcommittee on Environment is one of five subcommittees of the United States House Committee on Science, Space and Technology.

== History ==
Chairs of the subcommittee:

- Andy Harris (R), Maryland, 2013
- Chris Stewart (R), Utah, 2013-2015
- Jim Bridenstine (R), Oklahoma, 2015-2017
- Andy Biggs (R), Arizona, 2017-2019
- Lizzie Pannill Fletcher (D), Texas, 2019-2020
- Mikie Sherrill (D), New Jersey, 2020-2023
- Max Miller (R), Ohio, 2023–2025
- Scott Franklin (R), Florida, 2025–present

== Jurisdiction ==
The Subcommittee on Environment shall have jurisdiction over the following subject matters:

All matters relating to environmental research; Environmental Protection Agency research and development; environmental standards; climate change research and development; the National Oceanic and Atmospheric Administration, including all activities related to weather, weather services, climate, the atmosphere, marine fisheries, and oceanic research; risk assessment activities; scientific issues related to environmental policy, including climate change;; other appropriate matters as referred by the Chair; and relevant oversight.

== Members, 119th Congress ==
Majority	Minority
Scott Franklin, Florida, Chair; Max Miller, Ohio; David Rouzer, North Carolina; Jeff Hurd, Colorado; Nick Begich III, Alaska	Gabe Amo, Rhode Island, Ranking Member; Suzanne Bonamici, Oregon; Deborah Ross, North Carolina
Ex officio
Brian Babin, Texas	Zoe Lofgren, California

== Historical membership rosters ==
=== 115th Congress ===
Majority	Minority
Andy Biggs, Arizona, Chairman; Jim Banks, Indiana, Vice Chair; Dana Rohrabacher, California; Bill Posey, Florida; Mo Brooks, Alabama; Randy Weber, Texas; Brian Babin, Texas; Gary Palmer, Alabama; Barry Loudermilk, Georgia; Clay Higgins, Louisiana	Suzanne Bonamici, Oregon, Ranking Member; Colleen Hanabusa, Hawaii; Charlie Crist, Florida; Conor Lamb, Pennsylvania

Source: Committee on Science, Space, and Technology official Roster

=== 116th Congress ===
Majority	Minority
Mikie Sherrill, New Jersey, Chair; Suzanne Bonamici, Oregon; Conor Lamb, Pennsylvania; Paul Tonko, New York; Charlie Crist, Florida; Sean Casten, Illinois; Ben McAdams, Utah; Don Beyer, Virginia	Roger Marshall, Kansas, Ranking Member; Brian Babin, Texas; Anthony Gonzalez, Ohio; Jim Baird, Indiana; Jenniffer González, Puerto Rico
Ex officio
Eddie Bernice Johnson, Texas	Frank Lucas, Oklahoma

=== 117th Congress ===
Majority	Minority
Mikie Sherrill, New Jersey, Chair; Dan Kildee, Michigan; Lizzie Fletcher, Texas; Charlie Crist, Florida; Sean Casten, Illinois	Stephanie Bice, Oklahoma, Ranking Member; Anthony Gonzalez, Ohio; Randy Feenstra, Iowa; Carlos A. Giménez, Florida
Ex officio
Eddie Bernice Johnson, Texas	Frank Lucas, Oklahoma

=== 118th Congress ===
Majority	Minority
Max Miller, Ohio, Chair; Bill Posey, Florida; Rick Crawford, Arkansas; Ryan Zinke, Montana; Mike Collins, Georgia; Vince Fong, California (from June 3, 2024)	Deborah Ross, North Carolina, Ranking Member; Suzanne Bonamici, Oregon; Maxwell Frost, Florida
Ex officio
Frank Lucas, Oklahoma	Zoe Lofgren, California
