= United States House Science Subcommittee on Investigations and Oversight =

Subcommittee of Committee on Science, Space, and Technology
- Active United States House of Representatives; 119th Congress

Leadership
- Chair: Rich McCormick (R)
- Ranking Member: Emilia Sykes (D)

Structure
- Seats: 8 (8 currently filled) 5/5 3/3
- Political parties: Majority (5): Republican (5); Minority (3): Democratic (3)

Meeting place
- 2321, Rayburn House Office Building; Washington, D.C. 20515

Phone number
- (202)-225-6371

The Science Subcommittee on Investigations and Oversight is one of five subcommittees of the United States House Committee on Science and Technology. This subcommittee is responsible for general and special investigative and oversight authority on all matters within the jurisdiction of the Committee on Science and Technology, including those matters covered by the other subcommittees.

== Members, 119th Congress ==
Majority	Minority
Rich McCormick, Georgia, Chair; Daniel Webster, Florida; Darrell Issa, California; Pat Harrigan, North Carolina; Nick Begich III, Alaska	Emilia Sykes, Ohio, Ranking Member; Suzanne Bonamici, Oregon; Luz Rivas, California
Ex officio
Brian Babin, Texas	Zoe Lofgren, California

== Historical membership rosters ==
=== 115th Congress ===
Majority	Minority
Darin LaHood, Illinois, Chair; Roger Marshall, Kansas, Vice Chair; Bill Posey, Florida; Thomas Massie, Kentucky; Gary Palmer, Alabama; Barry Loudermilk, Georgia; Clay Higgins, Louisiana	Don Beyer, Virginia, Ranking Member; Jerry McNerney, California; Ed Perlmutter, Colorado
Ex officio
Lamar S. Smith, Texas	Eddie Bernice Johnson, Texas

=== 116th Congress ===
Majority	Minority
Bill Foster, Illinois, Chair; Suzanne Bonamici, Oregon; Steve Cohen, Tennessee; Don Beyer, Virginia; Jennifer Wexton, Virginia	Ralph Norman, South Carolina, Ranking Member; Andy Biggs, Arizona; Mike Waltz, Florida
Ex officio
Eddie Bernice Johnson, Texas	Frank Lucas, Oklahoma

=== 117th Congress ===
Majority	Minority
Bill Foster, Illinois, Chair; Ed Perlmutter, Colorado; Ami Bera, California; Gwen Moore, Wisconsin; Sean Casten, Illinois	Jay Obernolte, California, Ranking Member; Pete Sessions, Texas
Ex officio
Eddie Bernice Johnson, Texas	Frank Lucas, Oklahoma

=== 118th Congress ===
Majority	Minority
Jay Obernolte, California, Chair; Brian Babin, Texas; Max Miller, Ohio; Rich McCormick, Georgia; Vince Fong, California (from June 3, 2024)	Valerie Foushee, North Carolina, Ranking Member; Kevin Mullin, California; Jeff Jackson, North Carolina
Ex officio
Frank Lucas, Oklahoma	Zoe Lofgren, California
