= Michael Lamb (politician) =

American politician and attorney

City Controller of Pittsburgh
- In office January 7, 2008 – January 8, 2024
- Preceded by: Anthony Pokora
- Succeeded by: Rachael Heisler

Personal details
- Born: 1962 (age 62–63)
- Political party: Democratic
- Spouse: Jill Zilka
- Relatives: Thomas F. Lamb (father); Conor Lamb (nephew)
- Education: Pennsylvania State University, University Park (BA); Duquesne University (JD); Carnegie Mellon University (MPP)

Michael Lamb (born 1962) is an American politician and attorney who served as Controller of the City of Pittsburgh from 2008 to 2024. He was most recently a candidate for Allegheny County executive, but was defeated in the Democratic Primary by Sara Innamorato.

== Early life and education ==
In 1962, he was born to politician Thomas F. Lamb and Barbara Joyce. In high school, he was on the student council and was voted as most active. Lamb first attended Pennsylvania State University where during the 1984 presidential election he coordinated John Glenn's presidential campaign at the college level and eventually graduated with a bachelor's degree in 1984. Lamb earned a Juris Doctor from the Duquesne University School of Law and Master of Public Policy from Heinz College at Carnegie Mellon University.

== Career ==
In 1986, Lamb volunteered for Representative Doug Walgren. In 2005, he ran in the Democratic primary for the mayoralty of Pittsburgh, but placed third. In 2007, he defeated city council president Doug Shields, former state senator Michael Dawida, and incumbent city controller Anthony Pokora in the Democratic primary for Pittsburgh City Controller. In the general election his only opponent was Mark Rauterkus, a Libertarian, whom he defeated. This was the only time he faced an opponent for the office in a general election.

In 2012, Lamb, along with Jim Burn, chairman of the Pennsylvania Democratic Party, and Georgia Berner, criticized Mitt Romney for his statement that he will "take a lot of credit that the auto industry has come back". On January 16, 2013, he announced that he would challenge incumbent Mayor Luke Ravenstahl in the Democratic primary, becoming his second challenger, but after Ravenstahl dropped out he also dropped out and endorsed Auditor General Jack Wagner, who came in second place.

On November 19, 2019, he announced his candidacy for the Democratic nomination for Pennsylvania Auditor General and later received endorsements from Representative Mike Doyle, Representative Conor Lamb, state Senate Minority leader Jay Costa, and state House Minority Leader Frank Dermody. He was defeated in the primary by former Philadelphia deputy mayor Nina Ahmad.

== Personal life ==
In 1995, Lamb married Jill Zilka. Lamb's nephew, Conor Lamb, is an attorney and served as a member of the United States House of Representatives.
