= Rich McCormick =

American politician (born 1968)

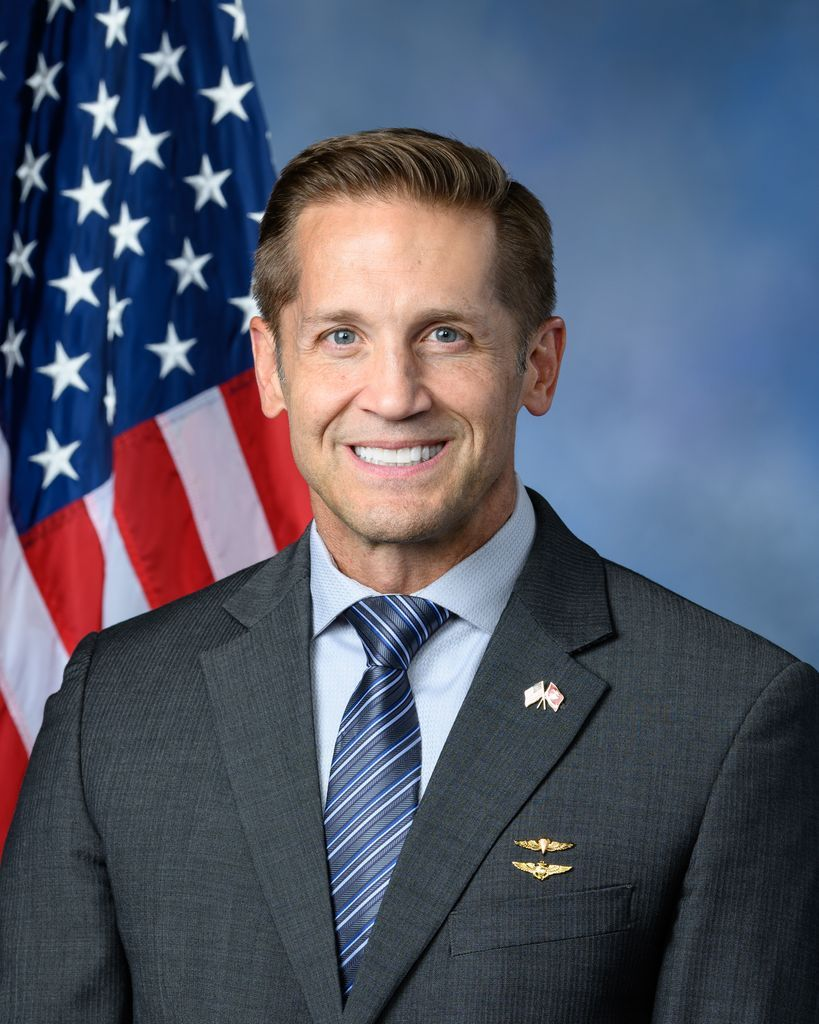
- Official portrait, 2023

Member of the U.S. House of Representatives from Georgia
- Incumbent
- Assumed office January 3, 2023
- Preceded by: Lucy McBath (redistricted)
- Constituency: 6th district (2023–2025); 7th district (2025–present)

Personal details
- Born: Richard Dean McCormick; October 7, 1968 (age 58) Las Vegas, Nevada, U.S.
- Party: Republican
- Spouse: Debra Miller (m. 2012; sep. 2024)
- Children: 3
- Education: Oregon State University (BS); National University (MBA); Morehouse School of Medicine (MD)
- Website: House website Campaign website

Military service
- Allegiance: United States
- Branch/service: United States Navy; United States Marine Corps
- Years of service: 1990–2017
- Rank: Commander
- McCormick's voice McCormick on Iranian protests. Recorded January 25, 2023

Richard Dean McCormick (born October 7, 1968) is an American physician and politician. A member of the Republican Party, he has represented Georgia in the United States House of Representatives since 2023. Until 2025, he represented the 6th congressional district. In 2024, he was elected to represent the 7th congressional district.

== Early life, education, and military service ==
McCormick in a USMC recruiting advertisement in 1990

McCormick was born in Las Vegas in 1968 and graduated from Central Catholic High School in Portland, Oregon, in 1986. He earned a Bachelor of Science from Oregon State University in 1990. He earned his Master of Business Administration from National University in 1999 and his Doctor of Medicine at Morehouse School of Medicine in 2010.

McCormick served in the United States Marine Corps and United States Navy for over 25 years, spending time in Africa, South Korea, Afghanistan, and the Persian Gulf. In the Marine Corps, he was a Naval Aviator and piloted the CH-53E Super Stallion helicopter; in the Navy, he was a Medical Corps officer and reached the rank of commander. During his Marine Corps service, McCormick was cast in the well known U.S Marine Corps recruiting commercial “Chess”. He is an emergency physician and works at Gwinnett Medical Center.

== U.S. House of Representatives ==
=== Elections ===
With Rob Woodall not running for reelection to the United States House of Representatives for Georgia's 7th congressional district in the 2020 elections, McCormick announced his candidacy. He won the primary election, receiving more than 50% of the vote, avoiding a runoff election. McCormick lost the general election to Democrat Carolyn Bourdeaux.

Following redistricting due to the 2020 U.S. census, McCormick announced his candidacy in the 2022 elections for the newly-redrawn Georgia's 6th congressional district, which became much more Republican-leaning. In a Republican primary with nine candidates, McCormick and Jake Evans advanced to a primary runoff. He defeated Evans in the runoff and won the November 8 general election against Democrat Bob Christian.

=== Tenure ===
McCormick was among 71 Republicans who voted against final passage of the Fiscal Responsibility Act of 2023 in the House.

On November 7, McCormick's H.Res. 845 censured Rashida Tlaib for "promoting false narratives regarding the October 7, 2023 Hamas attack on Israel and for calling for the destruction of the state of Israel".

In December 2023, fellow Georgia Republican Representative Marjorie Taylor Greene accused McCormick of grabbing her by the shoulders and shaking her, following a public spat between the two. She asked Speaker of the House Mike Johnson to investigate her claims. McCormick said he apologized for the interaction and despite an investigation by the Speaker of the House including a review of surveillance footage and dozens of witnesses, her allegations could not be corroborated.

Following the 2024 New Hampshire Republican primary in January, McCormick endorsed Donald Trump's 2024 presidential campaign, writing, "I am calling on my fellow conservatives to join me in uniting behind Donald Trump for president." McCormick had previously supported Ron DeSantis's presidential bid. During an October 2024 rally for Trump's campaign at McCamish Pavilion in Atlanta, McCormick said that Trump should be awarded the Nobel Peace Prize.

Speaking to Maria Bartiromo on Mornings with Maria in December 2024, McCormick said non-discretionary federal spending should be cut, explaining that:

We're going to have to have some hard decisions. We got to bring the Democrats in to talk about Social Security, Medicaid, Medicare. There's hundreds of billions of dollars to be saved, and we know how to do it, we just have to have the stomach to actually take those challenges on.

In January 2025, McCormick cosponsored fellow GOP House member Eric Burlison's bill recognizing personhood as starting at conception.

McCormick criticized having "a blanket rule that gives all kids lunches in high school", as the high schoolers "are capable of going out and actually getting a job and doing something that makes them have value", such as "going to work at Burger King, McDonald's, during the summer". When confronted with the fact that many children are not of working age, many 5 and under, he acknowledged that his guideline did not apply to everybody.

On February 20, 2025, Rich McCormick held a town hall meeting in Roswell, Georgia. The event was held at Roswell City Hall which did not have enough seating capacity for all the people who attempted to attend. Many people sat in various overflow rooms and some were turned away. This was one of the first instances of a trend where Republican members of congress received significant backlash from constituents regarding the beginning of Donald Trump's second term. Much of this backlash was in response to Elon Musk and DOGE, and eventually led to Republican Party leadership discouraging members from hosting in-person town halls.

=== Committee assignments ===
For the 119th Congress:

- Committee on Armed Services
  - Subcommittee on Cyber, Information Technologies, and Innovation
  - Subcommittee on Tactical Air and Land Forces
- Committee on Oversight and Government Reform
  - Subcommittee on Cybersecurity, Information Technology, and Government Innovation
- Committee on Science, Space, and Technology
  - Subcommittee on Investigations and Oversight (Chair)
  - Subcommittee on Space and Aeronautics

== Electoral history ==
=== 2024 ===
Georgia's 7th congressional district general election, 2024
Party	Candidate	Votes	%
Republican	Rich McCormick (incumbent)	275,907	64.85
Democratic	Bob Christian	178,208	35.15
Total votes		425,442	100

=== 2022 ===
Georgia 6th congressional district Republican primary, 2022
Party	Candidate	Votes	%
Republican	Rich McCormick	48,967	43.1
Republican	Jake Evans	26,160	23.0
Republican	Mary Mallory Staples	10,178	9.0
Republican	Meagan Hanson	9,539	8.4
Republican	Eugene Yu	7,411	6.5
Republican	Blake Harbin	4,171	3.7
Republican	Byron Gatewood	3,358	3.0
Republican	Suzi Voyles	2,646	2.3
Republican	Paulette Smith	1,123	1.0
Total votes		113,553	100.0

Georgia 6th congressional district Republican primary runoff, 2022
Party	Candidate	Votes	%
Republican	Rich McCormick	27,455	66.5
Republican	Jake Evans	13,808	33.5
Total votes		41,263	100.0

Georgia 6th congressional district general election, 2022
Party	Candidate	Votes	%
Republican	Rich McCormick	206,886	62.22
Democratic	Bob Christian	125,612	37.78

=== 2020 ===
Georgia 7th congressional district Republican primary, 2020
Party	Candidate	Votes	%
Republican	Rich McCormick	35,280	55.11
Republican	Renee Unterman	11,143	17.41
Republican	Mark Gonsalves	4,640	7.25
Republican	Lynne Homrich	4,567	7.13
Republican	Eugene Yu	3,856	6.02
Republican	Lisa Noel Babbage	3,336	5.21
Republican	Zachary H. Kennemore	1,195	1.87
Total votes		64,017	100.0

Georgia 7th congressional district general election, 2020
Party	Candidate	Votes	%
Democratic	Carolyn Bourdeaux	190,900	51.39
Republican	Rich McCormick	180,564	48.61
Total votes		371,464	100.0

== Personal life ==
McCormick has three sons from his first marriage. His second marriage was to Debra Miller, an oncologist from whom he filed for divorce in 2024 after 12 years of marriage. Since 2024, McCormick had been in relationship with Congresswoman Beth Van Duyne; however, McCormick and Van Duyne subsequently ended their relationship as reported by TMZ on October 7, 2026, although, as to the time the relationship ended, TMZ reported that "...it's unclear exactly when."

McCormick was the runner up of the seventh season of the initial run of American Gladiators, losing in the final to Pat Csizmazia.

U.S. House of Representatives
Preceded by Lucy McBath	Member of the U.S. House of Representatives from Georgia's 6th congressional district 2023–2025	Succeeded by Lucy McBath
Preceded by Lucy McBath	Member of the U.S. House of Representatives from Georgia's 7th congressional district 2025–present	Incumbent
U.S. order of precedence (ceremonial)
Preceded by Seth Magaziner	United States representatives by seniority 333rd	Succeeded by Morgan McGarvey
