= Anthony Gonzalez (politician) =

American football player and politician (born 1984)

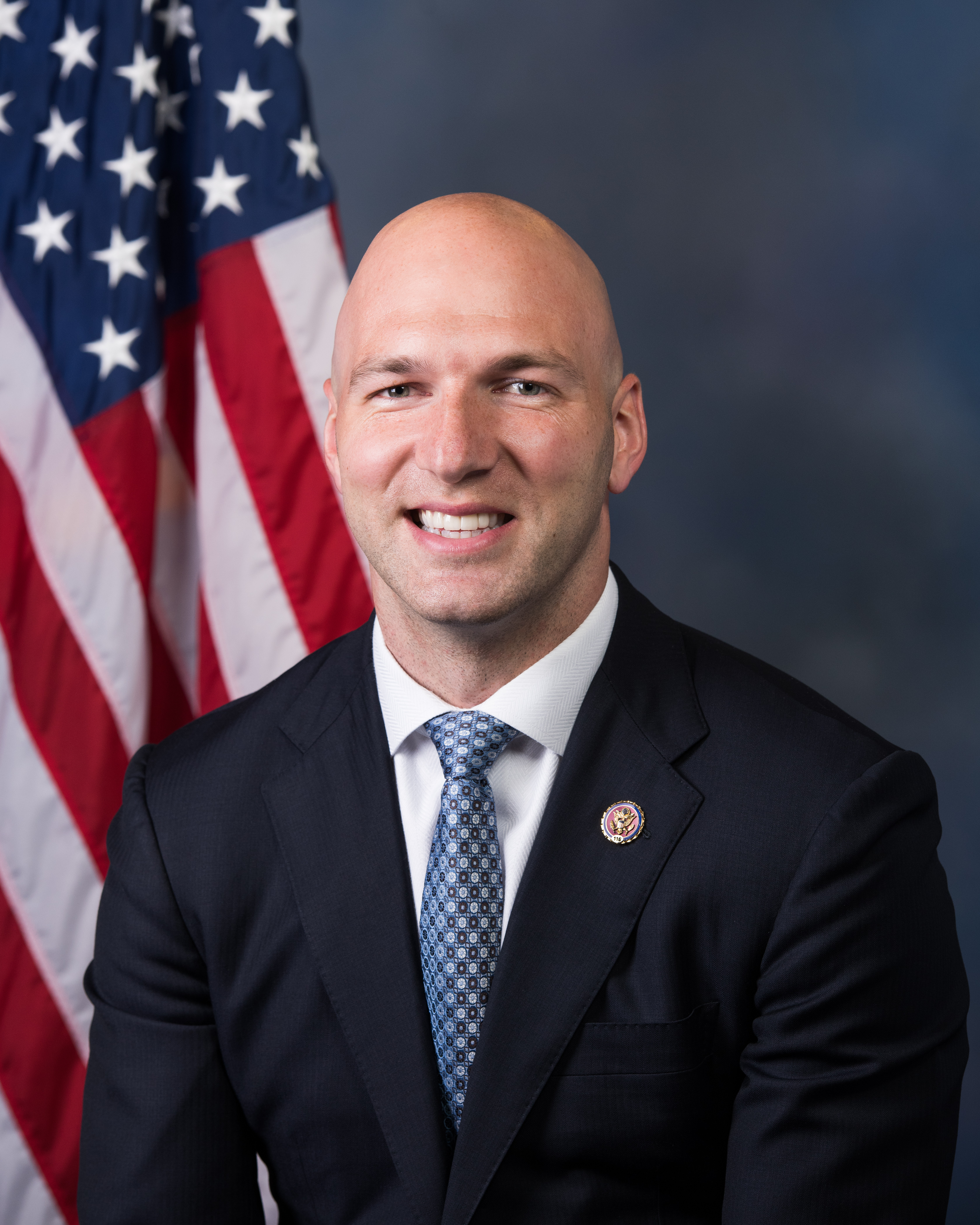
- Official portrait, 2019

Member of the U.S. House of Representatives from Ohio's 16th district
- In office January 3, 2019 – January 3, 2023
- Preceded by: Jim Renacci
- Succeeded by: Constituency abolished

Personal details
- Born: September 18, 1984 (age 42) Elyria, Ohio, U.S.
- Party: Republican
- Spouse: Elizabeth Gonzalez
- Children: 2
- Education: Ohio State University (BA); Stanford University (MBA)
- Football career

No. 11
- Position: Wide receiver

Personal information
- Listed height: 6 ft 0 in (1.83 m)
- Listed weight: 193 lb (88 kg)

Career information
- High school: St. Ignatius (Cleveland, Ohio)
- College: Ohio State (2003–2006)
- NFL draft: 2007: 1st round, 32nd overall pick

Career history
- Indianapolis Colts (2007–2011); New England Patriots (2012)*
- * Offseason or practice squad member only

Awards and highlights
- First-team All-Big Ten (2006)

Career NFL statistics
- Receptions: 99
- Receiving yards: 1,307
- Receiving touchdowns: 7
- Stats at Pro Football Reference
- Gonzalez's voice Gonzalez honoring a deceased Hinckley Township trustee. Recorded February 25, 2021

Anthony E. Gonzalez (born September 18, 1984) is an American politician and former professional football player. He served two terms as the U.S. representative for Ohio's 16th congressional district from 2019 to 2023.

He played college football for the Ohio State Buckeyes and was selected by the Indianapolis Colts with the final pick in the first round of the 2007 NFL draft. Following his sports career, which was cut short by injuries, he enrolled in graduate studies at Stanford University and earned a master's degree.

Gonzalez was elected to the U.S. House of Representatives on November 6, 2018, sworn in on January 3, 2019, and reelected in 2020. In September 2021, Gonzalez announced he would not seek another term.

== Early life ==
Gonzalez's maternal grandfather was a World War II veteran. His Cuban-American father immigrated to the U.S. from Cuba after Fidel Castro took power. His father is president of Ferragon Corporation, a steel company.

=== Athletics ===
Gonzalez attended St. Joseph grade school in Avon Lake, Ohio, and Saint Ignatius High School in Cleveland, Ohio, where he was a standout in both football and track. In football, he was a two-way player. As a senior, he was a first-team All-state honoree as well as the Associated Press and The Plain Dealer Co-defensive Player of the Year, catching 71 passes for 1,873 yards and scoring 21 touchdowns. His 26.4 yards per catch set a school record. In track, he lettered for four years and qualified for the state finals as a junior and senior. Gonzalez also played basketball as a freshman. He attended Ohio State University and was an Academic All-American majoring in philosophy, in which he earned a bachelor's degree.

== Football career ==
=== College ===
Gonzalez was a three-year letterman at Ohio State University, playing with fellow future NFL wide receivers Santonio Holmes, Ted Ginn Jr., and Roy Hall, as well as Heisman Trophy-winning quarterback Troy Smith. As a junior, Gonzalez was an All-Big Ten choice by league coaches. He finished his college career playing in the 2007 BCS National Championship Game, where the Buckeyes lost to the Florida Gators 41–14.

Year	Team	Games	Receiving			
Year	Team	Games	Rec	Yds	Avg	TD
2004	Ohio State	8	8	179	22.4	2
2005	Ohio State	12	28	373	13.3	3
2006	Ohio State	13	51	734	14.4	8
Total		33	87	1,286	14.8	13

=== Professional ===
Pre-draft measurables
Height	Weight	Arm length	Hand span	40-yard dash	10-yard split	20-yard split	20-yard shuttle	Three-cone drill	Vertical jump	Broad jump	Bench press
6 ft 0 in (1.83 m)	193 lb (88 kg)	31 in (0.79 m)	9 3/8 in (0.24 m)	4.44 s	1.57 s	2.59 s	4.08 s	6.54 s	38 in (0.97 m)	10 ft 3 in (3.12 m)	16 reps
All values from NFL Combine/Pro Day

==== Indianapolis Colts ====
Gonzalez was selected by the Indianapolis Colts with the 32nd selection in the 2007 NFL draft, and was taken to become the Colts' slot receiver. He was one of three Ohio State receivers selected in that draft.

In Gonzalez's first year, he caught 37 passes for 576 yards and three touchdowns. The next season he caught 57 passes for 664 yards and four touchdowns.

In 2009, Gonzalez earned the starting wide receiver position along with Reggie Wayne after Marvin Harrison was released from the team in the off-season. He injured his right knee during the season opener against Jacksonville Jaguars and was expected to miss up to eight weeks. He failed to return that season and was placed on injured reserve on December 24.

In 2010, Gonzalez lost the starting wide receiver position due to missing the 2009 season. He played in a total of two games as a slot receiver with five catches for 67 yards and no touchdowns. He injured his left leg in week eight against the Houston Texans and was placed on Injured Reserve for the rest of the year.

Gonzalez's role in the Colts offense diminished even further during the 2011 season. He played in only eight games and did not catch a pass. He became an unrestricted free agent in the following off-season.

During Gonzalez's time with Indianapolis, the Colts won three AFC South Division titles (2007, 2009, 2010), an AFC Championship (2009), and a trip to Super Bowl XLIV.

==== New England Patriots ====
On March 17, 2012, Gonzalez signed with the New England Patriots. The Patriots released him on May 29, 2012.

==== Career statistics ====
===== Regular season =====
Year	Team	Games		Receiving				
Year	Team	GP	GS	Rec	Yds	Avg	Lng	TD
2007	IND	13	9	37	576	15.6	57	3
2008	IND	16	2	57	664	11.6	58	4
2009	IND	1	1	0	0	0	0	0
2010	IND	2	0	5	67	13.4	34	0
2011	IND	8	0	0	0	0	0	0
Total		40	12	99	1,307	13.2	58	7

===== Playoffs =====
Year	Team	Games		Receiving				
Year	Team	GP	GS	Rec	Yds	Avg	Lng	TD
2007	IND	1	0	4	79	19.8	55	1
2008	IND	1	1	6	97	16.2	36	0
Total		2	1	10	176	17.6	55	1

=== Retirement ===
Gonzalez decided to retire from sports and enrolled in the Stanford Graduate School of Business in September 2012, from which he received a master of business administration degree.

== U.S. House of Representatives ==
=== Elections ===
==== 2018 ====
In 2018, Gonzalez filed to run as a Republican for the United States House of Representatives in Ohio's 16th congressional district. His predecessor, Jim Renacci, was retiring to mount an unsuccessful Senate campaign against incumbent Sherrod Brown. Gonzalez won the November 6 election with 57% of the vote, becoming the first Latino to represent Ohio in Congress. He raised more than $525,000 in less than a month after announcing his run, including donations from former NFL teammate Peyton Manning, Cleveland Browns owner Jimmy Haslam, and several other former NFL and college football players. Along with Texas Democrat Colin Allred, he was one of two former NFL players to be elected to Congress in 2018.

==== 2020 ====
Gonzalez defeated the Democratic nominee, physicist Aaron Paul Godfrey, 63.2% to 36.8%.

==== 2022 ====
Gonzalez originally ran for reelection in the 16th district, prompting a primary challenge from Republicans who supported former President Donald Trump due to Gonzalez's impeachment vote. Ohio's slow population growth in the 2020 United States census made the district obsolete as of 2023, leaving the campaigns' statuses unclear. On September 16, Gonzalez announced he would not run for Congress in 2022.

=== Tenure ===
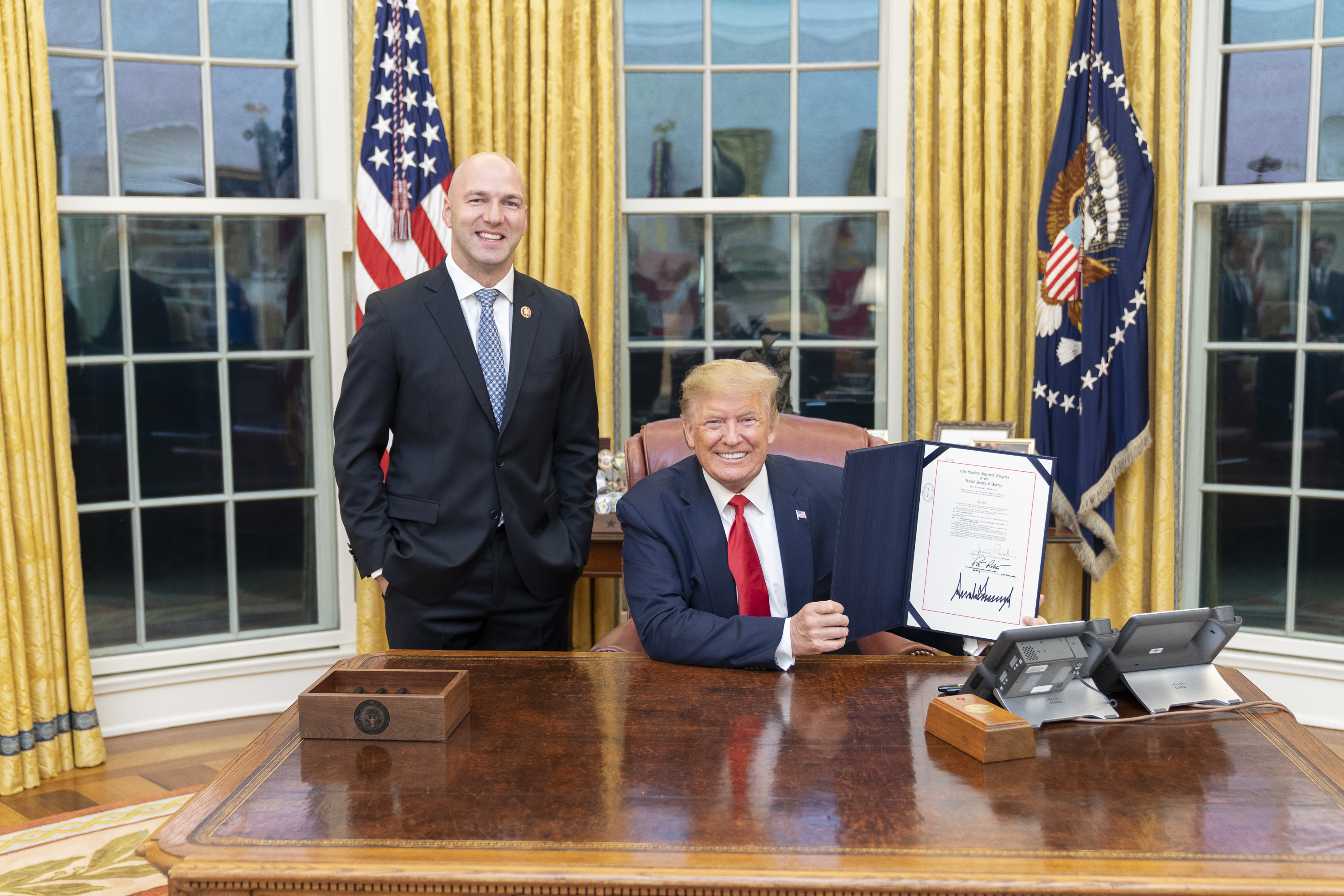
Gonzalez with President Donald Trump in January 2020

The House of Representatives impeached President Donald Trump on December 18, 2019, claiming Trump had abused the power of his office and obstructed the will of Congress by seeking foreign aid to influence the results of the 2020 election against challenger Joe Biden. Gonzalez voted not to impeach Trump, saying there was not enough evidence.

The Senate voted mostly on party lines to acquit Trump of the charges on February 5, 2020.

Just 12 days before the end of Trump's term, the House passed a second impeachment resolution with one article claiming "incitement of insurrection", before and during the U.S. Capitol attack. Gonzalez was one of ten Republicans who voted to impeach Trump for this offense. The Senate again acquitted Trump.

Ohio Republican Party chair Bob Paduchik said the second impeachment resolution addressed "an unconstitutional, politically motivated process that served no purpose." As a result of his vote to impeach Trump, the Ohio Republican Central Committee voted to censure Gonzalez, stating that Gonzalez had "betrayed his constituents" and "relied on emotions rather than the will of his constituents and any credible facts". Gonzalez and his family received continual threats following the impeachment vote, and he took additional security measures to protect his wife and family.

On May 19, 2021, Gonzalez was one of 35 Republicans who joined all Democrats in voting to approve legislation to establish the January 6 commission meant to investigate the storming of the U.S. Capitol. In retaliation, Trump endorsed former White House aide Max Miller in the 2022 primary for the seat.

On October 21, 2021, Gonzalez was one of nine House Republicans who voted to hold Steve Bannon in contempt of Congress. On November 5, 2021, he was among the 13 House Republicans to break with their party and vote with a majority of Democrats in favor of the Infrastructure Investment and Jobs Act.

==== Immigration ====
Gonzalez voted for the Consolidated Appropriations Act (H.R. 1158) which effectively prohibits ICE from cooperating with Health and Human Services to detain or remove illegal alien sponsors of unaccompanied alien children (UACs).

==== Same-sex marriage ====
On July 19, 2022, Gonzalez was one of 47 Republican Representatives to vote for the Respect for Marriage Act, which would codify the right to same-sex marriage in federal law.

==== Contraception ====
Gonzalez voted for H.R. 8373 ("The Right to Contraception Act"), a bill designed to protect access to contraceptives and health care providers' ability to provide contraceptives and information about contraception. It would also fund Planned Parenthood.

==== Big Tech ====
In 2022, Gonzalez was one of 39 Republicans to vote for the Merger Filing Fee Modernization Act of 2022, an antitrust package that would crack down on corporations for anti-competitive behavior.

=== Committee assignments ===
- Committee on Financial Services
  - Subcommittee on Housing, Community Development and Insurance
  - Subcommittee on National Security, International Development and Monetary Policy
  - Subcommittee on Diversity and Inclusion
- Committee on Science, Space and Technology
  - Subcommittee on Environment
  - Subcommittee on Research and Technology
- United States House Select Committee on the Climate Crisis

=== Caucus memberships ===
- Republican Main Street Partnership
- Problem Solvers Caucus

=== Electoral history ===
2018 OH-16 Republican Primary Results
Party	Candidate	Votes	%
Republican	Anthony Gonzalez	34,056	53.06
Republican	Christina Hagan	26,185	40.79
Republican	Michael Grusenmeyer	3,946	6.15
Total votes		64,187	100

Ohio's 16th congressional district, 2018
Party	Candidate	Votes	%
Republican	Anthony Gonzalez	170,029	56.7
Democratic	Susan Moran Palmer	129,681	43.3
Total votes		299,710	100.0
Republican hold			

Ohio 16th congressional district, 2020 Republican primary
Party	Candidate	Votes	%
Republican	Anthony Gonzalez (incumbent)	43,026	100.0
Total votes		43,026	100.0

Ohio's 16th congressional district, 2020
Party	Candidate	Votes	%
Republican	Anthony Gonzalez (incumbent)	247,335	63.2
Democratic	Aaron Paul Godfrey	144,071	36.8
Total votes		391,406	100.0
Republican hold			

== Personal life ==
Gonzalez, his wife, Elizabeth, and their two children live in Rocky River, Ohio.

== See also ==
- List of Hispanic and Latino Americans in the United States Congress

U.S. House of Representatives
Preceded by Jim Renacci	Member of the U.S. House of Representatives from Ohio's 16th congressional district 2019–2023	Constituency abolished
U.S. order of precedence (ceremonial)
Preceded by Steve Austria as Former U.S. Representative	Order of precedence of the United States as Former U.S. Representative	Succeeded by Ed Pease as Former U.S. Representative
