= Expand Social Security Caucus =

- Senate Co-Chairs: Bernie Sanders, Elizabeth Warren
- House Co-chairs: Debbie Dingell, Raul Grijalva, Conor Lamb, John Larson, Terri Sewell
- Founded: September 13, 2018; 8 years ago
- National affiliation: Democratic Party
- Colors: Blue
- Seats in the Senate Democratic Caucus: 19 / 48
- Seats in the Senate: 19 / 100
- Seats in the House Democratic Caucus: 115 / 214
- Seats in the House: 115 / 435

The Expand Social Security Caucus is a left-wing congressional caucus in the United States House of Representatives and United States Senate, consisting of members that advocate for the expansion of Social Security. It has 19 members in the Senate and 115 in the House, all deriving from the democratic caucus’ of both chambers.

According to Senate co-chair Bernie Sanders, the group was formed partly in response to President Donald Trump's recent claims that Democrats "want to destroy [your] Social Security".

== Electoral results ==
Election year	Senate				House of Representatives		
Election year	Overall seats	Democratic seats	Independent seats	±	Overall seats	Democratic seats	±
2018	19 / 100	18 / 45	1 / 2		150 / 435	150 / 233	+17
2020	19 / 100	18 / 46	1 / 2	—	115 / 435	115 / 222	-35

== Senate members ==
=== Current members ===
Arizona
- Ruben Gallego (D-AZ)

California

- Adam Schiff (D-CA)

Connecticut

- Richard Blumenthal (D-CT)
- Chris Murphy (D-CT)

Hawaii

- Mazie Hirono (D-HI)
- Brian Schatz (D-HI)

Illinois

- Tammy Duckworth (D-IL)

Maryland

- Chris Van Hollen (D-MD)

Massachusetts

- Elizabeth Warren (D-MA), co-chair
- Ed Markey (D-MA)

Minnesota

- Tina Smith (D-MN)

New Jersey

- Cory Booker (D-NJ)

New Mexico

- Ben Ray Luján (D-NM)

New York

- Kirsten Gillibrand (D-NY)

Oregon

- Ron Wyden (D-OR)
- Jeff Merkley (D-OR)

Rhode Island

- Sheldon Whitehouse (D-RI)

Vermont

- Bernie Sanders (I-VT), co-chair
- Peter Welch (D-VT)

Washington

- Patty Murray (D-WA)

== House members ==
=== Current members ===
Alabama
- Terri Sewell (D‑AL‑7, Birmingham), co-chair

California

- Mike Thompson (D‑CA‑4, St. Helena)
- John Garamendi (D‑CA‑8, Walnut Grove)
- Mark DeSaulnier (D‑CA‑10, Concord)
- Eric Swalwell (D‑CA‑14, Dublin)
- Kevin Mullin (D‑CA‑15, South San Francisco)
- Ro Khanna (D‑CA‑17, Fremont)
- Zoe Lofgren (D‑CA‑18, San Jose)
- Jimmy Panetta (D‑CA‑19, Carmel)
- Salud Carbajal (D‑CA‑24, Santa Barbara)
- Raul Ruiz (D‑CA‑25, Palm Dessert)
- Julia Brownley (D‑CA‑26, Oak Park)
- Judy Chu (D‑CA‑28, Monterey Park)
- Pete Aguilar (D‑CA‑33, Redlands)
- Jimmy Gomez (D‑CA‑34, Los Angeles)
- Ted Lieu (D‑CA‑36, Torrance)
- Linda Sánchez (D‑CA‑38, Whitter)
- Mark Takano (D‑CA‑39, Riverside)
- Nanette Barragán (D‑CA‑44, San Pedro)
- Juan Vargas (D‑CA‑52, San Diego)

Colorado

- Diana DeGette (D‑CO‑1, Denver)

Connecticut

- John Larson (D‑CT‑1, East Hartford), co-chair
- Joe Courtney (D‑CT‑2, Vernon)
- Rosa DeLauro (D‑CT‑3, New Haven)
- Jim Himes (D‑CT‑4, Cos Cob)

Florida

- Darren Soto (D‑FL‑9, Orlando)
- Kathy Castor (D‑FL‑14, Tampa)

Georgia

- Hank Johnson (D‑GA‑4, Lithonia)

Illinois

- Robin Kelly (D‑IL‑2, Matteson)
- Mike Quigley (D‑IL‑5, Chicago)
- Danny K. Davis (D‑IL‑7, Chicago)
- Jan Schakowsky (D‑IL‑9, Evanson)
- Bill Foster (D‑IL‑11, Naperville)

Indiana

- André Carson (D‑IN‑7, Indianapolis)

Maine

- Chellie Pingree (D‑ME‑1, North Haven)

Maryland

- Jamie Raskin (D‑MD‑8, Takoma Park)

Massachusetts

- Richard Neal (D‑MA‑1, Springfield)
- Jim McGovern (D‑MA‑2, Worcester)
- Katherine Clark (D‑MA‑5, Melrose)
- Seth Moulton (D‑MA‑6, Salem)
- Bill Keating (D‑MA‑9, Bourne)

Michigan

- Debbie Dingell (D‑MI‑6, Dearborn), co-chair

Minnesota

- Betty McCollum (D‑MN‑4, Saint Paul)

Mississippi

- Bennie Thompson (D‑MS‑2, Jackson)

Nevada

- Dina Titus (D‑NV‑1, Las Vegas)

New Jersey

- Josh Gottheimer (D‑NJ‑5, Wyckoff)
- Frank Pallone (D‑NJ‑6, Long Branch)
- Bonnie Watson Coleman (D‑NJ‑12, Ewing Township)

New York

- Gregory Meeks (D‑NY‑5, Queens)
- Grace Meng (D‑NY‑6, Queens)
- Nydia Velázquez (D‑NY‑7, Brooklyn)
- Hakeem Jeffries (D‑NY‑8, Brooklyn)
- Yvette Clarke (D‑NY‑9, Brooklyn)
- Adriano Espaillat (D‑NY‑13, Manhattan)
- Paul Tonko (D‑NY‑20, Amsterdam)

Ohio

- Greg Landsman (D‑OH‑1, Cincinnati)
- Marcy Kaptur (D‑OH‑9, Toledo)

Oregon

- Suzanne Bonamici (D‑OR‑1, Beaverton)

Pennsylvania

- Brendan Boyle (D‑PA‑2, Philadelphia)
- Dwight Evans (D‑PA‑3, Philadelphia)

Rhode Island

- Seth Magaziner (D‑RI‑2, Providence)

Tennessee

- Steve Cohen (D‑TN‑9, Memphis)

Texas

- Al Green (D‑TX‑9, Houston)
- Henry Cuellar (D‑TX‑28, Laredo)
- Marc Veasey (D‑TX‑33, Fort Worth)
- Lloyd Doggett (D‑TX‑37, Austin)

Virginia

- Bobby Scott (D‑VA‑3, Newport News)
- Don Beyer (D‑VA‑8, Alexandria)

Washington

- Suzan DelBene (D‑WA‑1, Medina)
- Rick Larsen (D‑WA‑2, Lake Stevens)
- Emily Randall (D‑WA‑6, Bremerton)
- Pramila Jayapal (D‑WA‑7, Seattle)
- Adam Smith (D‑WA‑9, Bellevue)

Wisconsin

- Mark Pocan (D‑WI‑2, Black Earth)

Washington, D.C.

- Eleanor Holmes Norton (D‑DC‑AL, Washington)

Virgin Islands

- Stacey Plaskett (D‑VI‑AL, St. Croix)

=== Former members ===
- Bob Brady (D-PA)
- Mike Capuano (D-MA)
- Lacy Clay (D-MO)
- Joe Crowley (D-NY)
- John Delaney (D-MD)
- Keith Ellison (D-MN)
- Eliot Engel (D-NY)
- Elizabeth Esty (D-CT)
- Tulsi Gabbard (D-HI)
- Gene Green (D-TX)
- Luis Gutiérrez (D-IL)
- Denny Heck (D-WA)
- Joe Kennedy III (D-MA)
- Ruben Kihuen (D-NV)
- Sandy Levin (D-MI)
- John Lewis (D-GA)
- Ben Ray Luján (D-NM)
- Michelle Lujan Grisham (D-NM)
- Rick Nolan (D-MN)
- Beto O'Rourke (D-TX)
- Collin Peterson (D-MN)
- Cedric Richmond (D-LA)
- José Serrano (D-NY)
- Carol Shea-Porter (D-NH)
- Filemon Vela Jr. (D-TX)
