= Thomas F. Lamb =

American politician and attorney

Member of the Pennsylvania Senate from the 42nd district
- In office January 7, 1969 – November 30, 1974
- Preceded by: Bernard B. McGinnis
- Succeeded by: Eugene Scanlon
- Constituency: Parts of Allegheny County

Member of the Pennsylvania House of Representatives from the Allegheny County district
- In office January 6, 1959 – November 30, 1966

Personal details
- Born: Thomas Francis Lamb; October 22, 1922 Pittsburgh, Pennsylvania, U.S.
- Died: May 7, 2015 (aged 92) Mount Lebanon, Pennsylvania, U.S.
- Party: Democratic
- Spouse: Barbara Joyce Lamb
- Relations: Conor Lamb (grandson)
- Children: 4, including Michael
- Education: Duquesne University (BA, LLB)

Military service
- Allegiance: United States
- Branch/service: United States Navy
- Years of service: World War II

Thomas Francis Lamb (October 22, 1922 – May 7, 2015) was an American politician and attorney who served as a member of both chambers of the Pennsylvania General Assembly.

== Early life and education ==
Lamb was born on October 22, 1922, in Pittsburgh, Pennsylvania, the son of James Lamb and Agnes Dunne Lamb. Following his education at St. James Elementary and High School, Lamb earned a Bachelor of Arts from Duquesne University and a Bachelor of Laws from Duquesne University Law School.

== Career ==
During World War II, he served as a lieutenant in the United States Armed Forces. Lamb gained membership to the Allegheny County bar association and Pennsylvania Bar Association, allowing him to practice law during his career.

In 1958, Lamb was elected to the Pennsylvania House of Representatives, where he served until 1966. During his time as a state representative, Lamb was instrumental in making the University of Pittsburgh a state-related institution to save it from bankruptcy.

Later, he was elected to the Pennsylvania State Senate, serving from 1969 to 1974. As the Democratic majority leader, Lamb led efforts concerning the environmental effects of mining, civil rights and entitlements, and the creation of the Port Authority Transit. In 1974, he did not run for re-election in order to have more time to spend with his family.

== Personal life ==
In 1957, he married Barbara Joyce, with whom he had four children, including Michael Lamb. Lamb is the grandfather of Conor Lamb (b. 1984), an attorney, former federal prosecutor, Captain in the United States Marine Corps, and the U.S. representative from Pennsylvania's 18th congressional district.

Lamb died in Mount Lebanon, Pennsylvania, on May 7, 2015. He was buried with a Catholic funeral.
