= Lanell Cofer =

American politician and lawyer

Lanell Cofer (12 March 1948 – 18 October 2018) was an American politician and lawyer.

Cofer was born on 12 March 1948 and graduated from East Texas State University in 1971 before attending the Texas Southern University School of Law. After earning her Juris Doctor in 1974, she became an attorney based in Dallas.

After Eddie Bernice Johnson resigned the District 33-0 seat in the Texas House of Representatives, Cofer, a fellow Democrat and African-American, won a November 1977 special election to succeed Johnson, and took office on 8 December 1977. During her legislative tenure, Cofer remained a Dallas resident. After completing Johnson's term, Cofer won two full terms in her own right before stepping down on 11 January 1983. She died on 18 October 2018.
