= United States House Science Subcommittee on Research and Technology =

Subcommittee of Committee on Science, Space, and Technology
- Active United States House of Representatives; 119th Congress

Leadership
- Chair: Jay Obernolte (R)
- Ranking Member: Haley Stevens (D)

Structure
- Seats: 12 (12 currently filled) 7/7 5/5
- Political parties: Majority (7): Republican (7); Minority (5): Democratic (5)

Meeting place
- 2321, Rayburn House Office Building; Washington, D.C. 20515

Phone number
- (202)-225-6371

The Science Subcommittee on Research and Technology is one of five subcommittees of the United States House Committee on Science, Space, and Technology.

== Jurisdiction ==
The subcommittee has legislative jurisdiction and general and special oversight and investigative authority on all matters relating to science policy including:

- Office of Science and Technology Policy;
- all scientific research, and scientific and engineering resources (including human resources), math, science and engineering education;
- intergovernmental mechanisms for research, development, and demonstration and cross-cutting programs;
- international scientific cooperation;
- National Science Foundation;
- university research policy, including infrastructure and overhead;
- university research partnerships, including those with industry;
- science scholarships;
- issues relating to computers, communications, and information technology;
- earthquake and fire research programs including those related to wildfire proliferation research and prevention;
- research and development relating to health, biomedical, and nutritional programs;
- to the extent appropriate, agricultural, geological, biological and life sciences research; and
- materials research, development, and demonstration and policy.

== History ==
Chairs of the subcommittee:

- Bob Inglis (R), South Carolina, 2005–2007
- Brian Baird (D), Washington, 2007–2009
- Dan Lipinski (D), Illinois, 2009–2011
- Mo Brooks (R), Alabama, 2011–2013
- Larry Bucshon (R), Indiana, 2013–2015
- Barbara Comstock (R), Virginia, 2015–2019
- Haley Stevens (D), Michigan, 2019–2023
- Mike Collins (R), Georgia, 2023–2025
- Jay Obernolte (R), California, 2025–present

== Members, 119th Congress ==
Majority	Minority
Jay Obernolte, California, Chair; Jim Baird, Indiana; Darrell Issa, California; Vince Fong, California; David Rouzer, North Carolina; Sheri Biggs, South Carolina; Mike Kennedy, Utah	Haley Stevens, Michigan, Ranking Member; Suhas Subramanyam, Virginia; Luz Rivas, California; Sarah McBride, Delaware; April McClain Delaney, Maryland
Ex officio
Brian Babin, Texas	Zoe Lofgren, California

== Historical membership rosters ==
=== 118th Congress ===
Majority	Minority
Mike Collins, Georgia, Chair; Jim Baird, Indiana; Darrell Issa, California; Rick Crawford, Arkansas; Scott Franklin, Florida; Brandon Williams, New York; Tom Kean, New Jersey	Haley Stevens, Michigan, Ranking Member; Andrea Salinas, Oregon; Kevin Mullin, California; Emilia Sykes, Ohio; Suzanne Bonamici, Oregon
Ex officio
Frank Lucas, Oklahoma	Zoe Lofgren, California

=== 117th Congress ===
Majority	Minority
Haley Stevens, Michigan, Chair; Paul Tonko, New York; Gwen Moore, Wisconsin; Susan Wild, Pennsylvania; Bill Foster, Illinois; Don Beyer, Virginia; Conor Lamb, Pennsylvania; Deborah K. Ross, North Carolina	Mike Waltz, Florida, Ranking Member; Anthony Gonzalez, Ohio; Jim Baird, Indiana; Pete Sessions, Texas; Jake LaTurner, Kansas; Peter Meijer, Michigan
Ex officio
Eddie Bernice Johnson, Texas	Frank Lucas, Oklahoma

=== 116th Congress ===
Majority	Minority
Haley Stevens, Michigan, Chair; Dan Lipinski, Illinois; Mikie Sherrill, New Jersey; Brad Sherman, California; Paul Tonko, New York; Ben McAdams, Utah; Steve Cohen, Tennessee; Bill Foster, Illinois	Jim Baird, Indiana, Ranking Member; Roger Marshall, Kansas; Neal Dunn, Florida; Troy Balderson, Ohio; Anthony Gonzalez, Ohio; Jaime Herrera Beutler, Washington
Ex officio
Eddie Bernice Johnson, Texas	Frank Lucas, Oklahoma

=== 115th Congress ===
Majority	Minority
Barbara Comstock, Virginia, Chairwoman; Ralph Abraham, Louisiana, Vice Chair; Frank Lucas, Oklahoma; Randy Hultgren, Illinois; Steve Knight, California; Darin LaHood, Illinois; Daniel Webster, Florida; Jim Banks, Indiana; Roger Marshall, Kansas; Gary Palmer, Alabama	Dan Lipinski, Illinois, Ranking Member; Elizabeth Esty, Connecticut; Jacky Rosen, Nevada; Suzanne Bonamici, Oregon; Ami Bera, California; Don Beyer, Virginia
Ex officio
Lamar S. Smith, Texas	Eddie Bernice Johnson, Texas
