= United States House Committee on Science, Space, and Technology =

Standing committee of the United States House of Representatives

House Science Committee
Standing committee
- Active United States House of Representatives; 119th Congress

History
- Formed: January 3, 1959

Leadership
- Chair: Brian Babin (R); Since January 13, 2025
- Ranking Member: Zoe Lofgren (D); Since January 3, 2023

Structure
- Seats: 40 (40 currently filled) 22/22 18/18
- Political parties: Majority (22): Republican (22); Minority (18): Democratic (18)

Jurisdiction
- Oversight authority: NASA, NSF, NIST, White House Office of Science and Technology Policy

Subcommittees
- Research and Technology; Space and Aeronautics; Environment; Energy; Investigations and Oversight

Meeting place
- 2321, Rayburn House Office Building; Washington, D.C. 20515

Website
- science.house.gov (Republican) democrats-science.house.gov (Democratic)

Phone number
- (202)-225-6371

The Committee on Science, Space, and Technology is a committee of the United States House of Representatives. It has jurisdiction over non-defense federal scientific research and development. More specifically, the committee has complete jurisdiction over the following federal agencies: NASA, NSF, NIST, and the OSTP. The committee also has authority over R&D activities at the Department of Energy, the EPA, FAA, NOAA, the DOT, the NWS, the DHS and the U.S. Fire Administration.

== History ==
In the wake of the Soviet Sputnik program in the late 1950s, Congress created the Select Committee on Astronautics and Space Exploration on 5 March 1958, chaired by majority leader John William McCormack, on the advice of National Defense Analyst Eilene Galloway. This select committee drafted the National Aeronautics and Space Act that created the National Aeronautics and Space Administration (NASA). A staff report of the committee, the Space Handbook: Astronautics and its Applications, provided non-technical information about spaceflight to U.S. policy makers.

The committee also chartered the permanent House Committee on Science and Astronautics, which officially began on January 3, 1959, and was the first new standing committee established in the House since 1946. The name was changed in 1974 to the House Committee on Science and Technology. The name was changed again in 1987 to the House Committee on Science, Space and Technology. After the Republican Party gained a majority in Congress in 1994, the name of the committee was changed to the House Committee on Science. With the return of control to the Democrats in 2007, the committee's name was changed back to the House Committee on Science and Technology.

During the 112th Congress, which was in session from 2011–2013, committee chair Ralph Hall added "Space" back into the committee's name: "The Committee on Science, Space, and Technology" – a nod to the committee's history, broad jurisdiction, and the importance of space exploration in maintaining American innovation and competitiveness.

== Members, 119th Congress ==
Majority	Minority
Brian Babin, Texas, Chair; Randy Weber, Texas; Jim Baird, Indiana; Daniel Webster, Florida; Jay Obernolte, California; Chuck Fleischmann, Tennessee; Darrell Issa, California; Claudia Tenney, New York; Scott Franklin, Florida; Max Miller, Ohio; Rich McCormick, Georgia; Vince Fong, California; David Rouzer, North Carolina; Keith Self, Texas; Pat Harrigan, North Carolina; Sheri Biggs, South Carolina; Jeff Hurd, Colorado; Mike Haridopolos, Florida; Mike Kennedy, Utah; Nick Begich III, Alaska; Matt Van Epps, Tennessee (from December 11, 2025); James Gallagher, California (from June 24, 2026)	Zoe Lofgren, California, Ranking Member; Suzanne Bonamici, Oregon; Haley Stevens, Michigan; Deborah Ross, North Carolina; Andrea Salinas, Oregon; Valerie Foushee, North Carolina; Emilia Sykes, Ohio; Maxwell Frost, Florida; Gabe Amo, Rhode Island; Suhas Subramanyam, Virginia; Luz Rivas, California; Sylvester Turner, Texas (until March 5, 2025); Sarah McBride, Delaware; Laura Gillen, New York; George T. Whitesides, California, Vice Ranking Member; Laura Friedman, California; April McClain Delaney, Maryland; Josh Riley, New York; Christian Menefee, Texas (from February 10, 2026); Bill Foster, Illinois (from May 20, 2025)

Resolutions electing members: H.Res. 13 (Chair), H.Res. 14 (Ranking Member), H.Res. 42 (R), H.Res. 44 (D), H.Res. 430 (Foster), H.Res. 940 (Van Epps), H.Res. 1048 (Menefee), H.Res. 1381 (Gallagher)

== Subcommittees ==
Subcommittee	Chair	Ranking Member
Energy	Randy Weber (R-TX)	Deborah Ross (D-NC)
Environment	Scott Franklin (R-FL)	Gabe Amo (D-RI)
Investigations and Oversight	Rich McCormick (R-GA)	Emilia Sykes (D-OH)
Research and Technology	Jay Obernolte (R-CA)	Haley Stevens (D-MI)
Space and Aeronautics	Mike Haridopolos (R-FL)	Valerie Foushee (D-NC)

== Committee leadership ==
Chairs and ranking members are listed below.

Chairs
Name	Party	State	Start	End
John McCormack	Democratic	MA	1958	1959
Overton Brooks	Democratic	LA	1959	1961
George Miller	Democratic	CA	1961	1973
Olin Teague	Democratic	TX	1973	1978
Don Fuqua	Democratic	FL	1979	1987
Robert Roe	Democratic	NJ	1987	1991
George Brown	Democratic	CA	1991	1995
Bob Walker	Republican	PA	1995	1997
Jim Sensenbrenner	Republican	WI	1997	2001
Sherwood Boehlert	Republican	NY	2001	2007
Bart Gordon	Democratic	TN	2007	2011
Ralph Hall	Republican	TX	2011	2013
Lamar Smith	Republican	TX	2013	2019
Eddie Bernice Johnson	Democratic	TX	2019	2023
Frank Lucas	Republican	OK	2023	2025
Brian Babin	Republican	TX	2025	present

Ranking members
Name	Party	State	Start	End
Joe Martin	Republican	MA	1958	1967
James Fulton	Republican	PA	1967	1973
Charles Mosher	Republican	OH	1973	1977
John Wydler	Republican	NY	1977	1981
Larry Winn	Republican	KY	1981	1985
Manuel Luján	Republican	NM	1985	1989
Bob Walker	Republican	PA	1989	1995
George Brown	Democratic	CA	1995	1999
Ralph Hall	Democratic	TX	1999	2003
Bart Gordon	Democratic	TN	2003	2007
Ralph Hall	Republican	TX	2007	2011
Eddie Bernice Johnson	Democratic	TX	2011	2019
Frank Lucas	Republican	OK	2019	2023
Zoe Lofgren	Democratic	CA	2023	present

== Historical membership rosters ==
=== 118th Congress ===
Majority	Minority
Frank Lucas, Oklahoma, Chair; Bill Posey, Florida; Randy Weber, Texas; Brian Babin, Texas; Jim Baird, Indiana; Daniel Webster, Florida; Mike Garcia, California; Stephanie Bice, Oklahoma; Jay Obernolte, California; Chuck Fleischmann, Tennessee; Darrell Issa, California; Rick Crawford, Arkansas; Claudia Tenney, New York; Ryan Zinke, Montana; Scott Franklin, Florida; Dale Strong, Alabama; Max Miller, Ohio; Rich McCormick, Georgia; Mike Collins, Georgia; Brandon Williams, New York; Thomas Kean Jr., New Jersey; Greg Lopez, Colorado (from July 8, 2024); Vince Fong, California (from June 3, 2024)	Zoe Lofgren, California, Ranking Member; Suzanne Bonamici, Oregon; Haley Stevens, Michigan; Jamaal Bowman, New York; Deborah Ross, North Carolina; Eric Sorensen, Illinois; Andrea Salinas, Oregon; Valerie Foushee, North Carolina; Kevin Mullin, California; Jeff Jackson, North Carolina; Emilia Sykes, Ohio; Maxwell Frost, Florida; Yadira Caraveo, Colorado; Summer Lee, Pennsylvania; Jennifer McClellan, Virginia; Gabe Amo, Rhode Island (from December 13, 2023); Ted Lieu, California; Sean Casten, Illinois; Paul Tonko, New York

Resolutions electing members: H.Res. 14 (Chair), H.Res. 15 (Ranking Member), H.Res. 80 (R), H.Res. 87 (D), H.Res. 164 (D), H.Res. 179 (R), H.Res. 205 (D), H.Res. 931 (D)

Subcommittees

Subcommittee	Chair	Ranking Member
Energy	Brandon Williams (R-NY)	Jamaal Bowman (D-NY)
Environment	Max Miller (R-OH)	Deborah Ross (D-NC)
Investigations and Oversight	Mike Collins (R-GA)	Valerie Foushee (D-NC)
Research and Technology	Jay Obernolte (R-CA)	Haley Stevens (D-MI)
Space and Aeronautics	Brian Babin (R-TX)	Eric Sorensen (D-IL)

=== 117th Congress ===
Majority	Minority
Eddie Bernice Johnson, Texas, Chair; Zoe Lofgren, California; Suzanne Bonamici, Oregon; Ami Bera, California; Haley Stevens, Michigan, Vice Chair; Mikie Sherrill, New Jersey; Jamaal Bowman, New York; Melanie Stansbury, New Mexico (since June 15, 2021); Brad Sherman, California; Ed Perlmutter, Colorado; Jerry McNerney, California; Paul Tonko, New York; Bill Foster, Illinois; Donald Norcross, New Jersey; Don Beyer, Virginia; Charlie Crist, Florida; Sean Casten, Illinois; Conor Lamb, Pennsylvania; Deborah K. Ross, North Carolina; Gwen Moore, Wisconsin; Dan Kildee, Michigan; Susan Wild, Pennsylvania; Lizzie Fletcher, Texas	Frank Lucas, Oklahoma, Ranking Member; Mo Brooks, Alabama; Bill Posey, Florida; Randy Weber, Texas; Brian Babin, Texas; Anthony Gonzalez, Ohio; Mike Waltz, Florida; Jim Baird, Indiana; Pete Sessions, Texas; Daniel Webster, Florida; Mike Garcia, California; Stephanie Bice, Oklahoma; Young Kim, California; Randy Feenstra, Iowa; Jake LaTurner, Kansas; Carlos Giménez, Florida; Jay Obernolte, California; Peter Meijer, Michigan; Jake Ellzey, Texas (since August 24, 2021); Mike Carey, Ohio (since December 1, 2021)

Resolutions electing members: H.Res. 9 (Chair), H.Res. 10 (Ranking Member), H.Res. 62 (D), H.Res. 63 (R), H.Res. 111 (D), H.Res. 475 (D), H.Res. 602 (R), H.Res. 826 (R)

Subcommittees

Subcommittee	Chair	Ranking Member
Energy	Jamaal Bowman (D-NY)	Randy Weber (R-TX)
Environment	Mikie Sherrill (D-NJ)	Stephanie Bice (R-OK)
Investigations and Oversight	Bill Foster (D-IL)	Jay Obernolte (R-CA)
Research and Technology	Haley Stevens (D-MI)	Mike Waltz (R-FL)
Space and Aeronautics	Don Beyer (D-VA)	Brian Babin (R-TX)

=== 116th Congress ===
Majority	Minority
Eddie Bernice Johnson, Texas, Chair; Zoe Lofgren, California; Dan Lipinski, Illinois; Suzanne Bonamici, Oregon; Ami Bera, California, Vice Chair; Lizzie Pannill Fletcher, Texas; Haley Stevens, Michigan; Kendra Horn, Oklahoma; Mikie Sherrill, New Jersey; Brad Sherman, California; Steve Cohen, Tennessee; Jerry McNerney, California; Ed Perlmutter, Colorado; Paul Tonko, New York; Bill Foster, Illinois; Don Beyer, Virginia; Charlie Crist, Florida; Sean Casten, Illinois; Katie Hill, California (until October 27, 2019); Ben McAdams, Utah; Jennifer Wexton, Virginia; Conor Lamb, Pennsylvania (since November 19, 2019)	Frank Lucas, Oklahoma, Ranking Member; Mo Brooks, Alabama; Bill Posey, Florida; Randy Weber, Texas; Brian Babin, Texas; Andy Biggs, Arizona; Roger Marshall, Kansas; Neal Dunn, Florida; Ralph Norman, South Carolina; Michael Cloud, Texas; Troy Balderson, Ohio; Pete Olson, Texas; Anthony Gonzalez, Ohio; Mike Waltz, Florida; Jim Baird, Indiana; Jaime Herrera Beutler, Washington; Jenniffer González, Puerto Rico; Francis Rooney, Florida (since July 24, 2019); Greg Murphy, North Carolina (since September 26, 2019); Mike Garcia, California (since July 1, 2020); Tom Tiffany, Wisconsin (since July 1, 2020)

Sources: H.Res. 24 (Chair), H.Res. 25 (Ranking Member), H.Res. 67 (D), H.Res. 68 (R), H.Res. 73 (D), H.Res. 264 (R), H.Res. 516 (R), H.Res. 596 (R), H.Res. 712 (D), H.Res. 1037 (R)

Subcommittees

There were five subcommittees in the 116th Congress.

Subcommittee	Chair	Ranking Member
Energy	Jamaal Bowman (D-NY)	Randy Weber (R-TX)
Environment	Mikie Sherrill (D-NJ)	Roger Marshall (R-KS)
Investigations and Oversight	Bill Foster (D-IL)	Ralph Norman (R-SC)
Research and Technology	Haley Stevens (D-MI)	Jim Baird (R-IN)
Space and Aeronautics	Don Beyer (D-VA)	Brian Babin (R-TX)

=== 115th Congress ===
Majority	Minority
Lamar Smith, Texas, Chair; Dana Rohrabacher, California; Frank Lucas, Oklahoma, Vice Chair; Mo Brooks, Alabama; Randy Hultgren, Illinois; Bill Posey, Florida; Thomas Massie, Kentucky; Jim Bridenstine, Oklahoma; Randy Weber, Texas; Steve Knight, California; Brian Babin, Texas; Barbara Comstock, Virginia; Gary Palmer, Alabama; Barry Loudermilk, Georgia; Ralph Abraham, Louisiana; Darin LaHood, Illinois; Daniel Webster, Florida; Jim Banks, Indiana; Andy Biggs, Arizona; Roger Marshall, Kansas; Neal Dunn, Florida; Clay Higgins, Louisiana; Ralph Norman, South Carolina	Eddie Bernice Johnson, Texas, Ranking Member; Zoe Lofgren, California; Dan Lipinski, Illinois; Suzanne Bonamici, Oregon; Ami Bera, California; Elizabeth Esty, Connecticut; Marc Veasey, Texas; Don Beyer, Virginia, Vice Ranking Member; Jacky Rosen, Nevada; Conor Lamb, Pennsylvania (from April 17, 2018); Jerry McNerney, California; Ed Perlmutter, Colorado; Paul Tonko, New York; Bill Foster, Illinois; Mark Takano, California; Colleen Hanabusa, Hawaii; Charlie Crist, Florida

== See also ==
- List of United States House of Representatives committees
