= Conor Lamb =

American politician and attorney (born 1984)

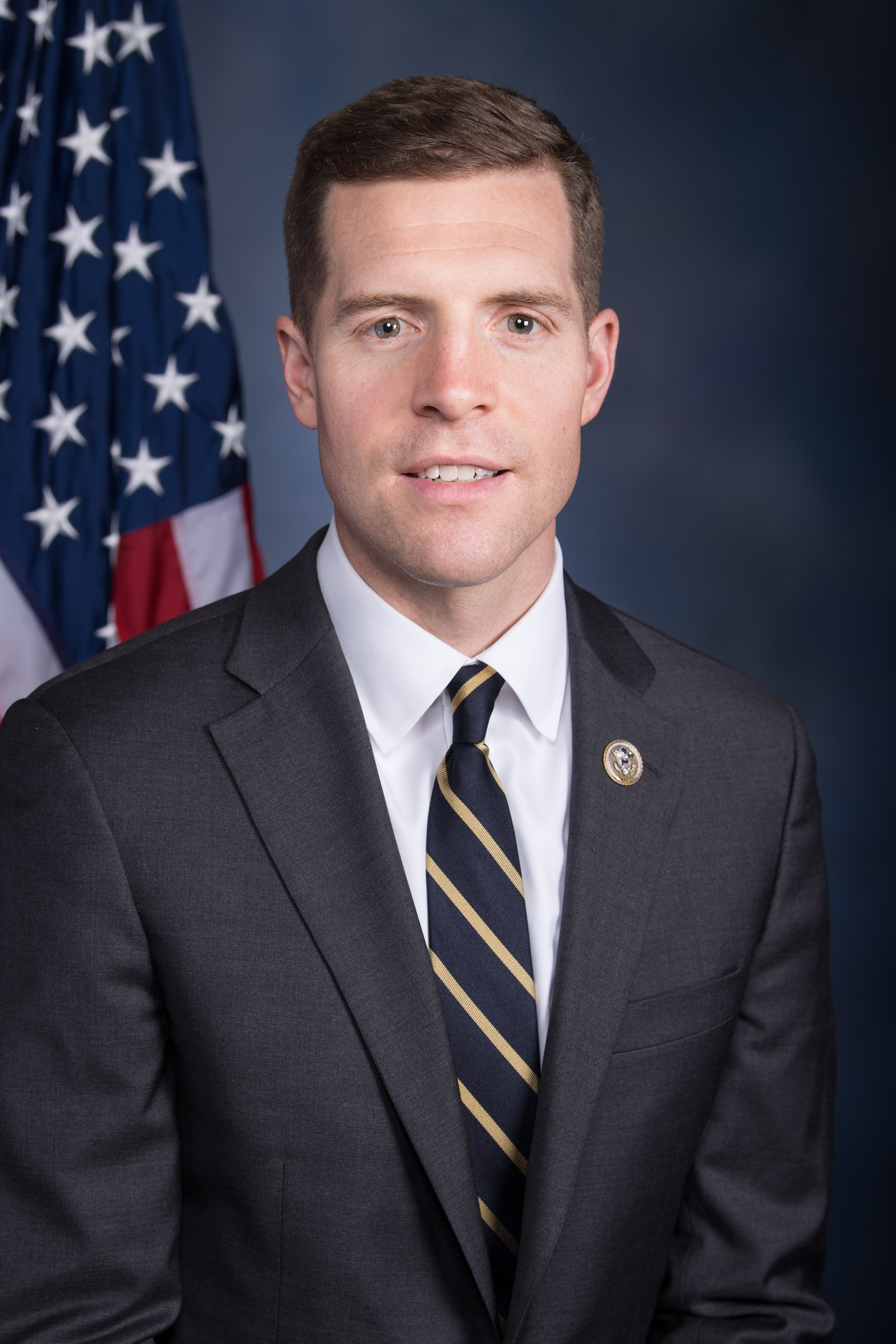
- Official portrait, 2018

Member of the U.S. House of Representatives from Pennsylvania
- In office April 12, 2018 – January 3, 2023
- Preceded by: Tim Murphy
- Succeeded by: Chris Deluzio
- Constituency: 18th district (2018–2019); 17th district (2019–2023)

Personal details
- Born: Conor James Lamb; June 27, 1984 (age 42) Washington, D.C., U.S.
- Party: Democratic
- Spouse: Hayley Haldeman (m. 2019)
- Children: 3
- Relatives: Thomas F. Lamb (grandfather); Michael Lamb (uncle)
- Education: University of Pennsylvania (BA, JD)

Military service
- Branch/service: United States Marine Corps
- Years of service: 2009–2013 (active); 2013–present (reserve)
- Rank: Major
- Unit: U.S. Marine Corps Reserve
- Awards: Navy and Marine Corps Commendation Medal (with two gold stars); Sea Service Ribbon; National Defense Service Medal; Global War on Terrorism Service Medal
- Lamb's voice Lamb supporting the Inflation Reduction Act. Recorded August 12, 2022

Conor James Lamb (born June 27, 1984) is an American attorney and politician who served as a U.S. representative from Pennsylvania from 2018 to 2023. A member of the Democratic Party, he briefly represented the Pennsylvania's 18th congressional district following a special election in 2018 and then won full terms to represent the 17th district in 2018 and 2020. He left the House to run for the U.S. Senate.

A longtime resident of Pittsburgh, Lamb earned his Juris Doctor degree from the University of Pennsylvania. He began his law career as a Judge Advocate for United States Marine Corps before serving as an assistant U.S. attorney in his home city from 2014 to 2017. Lamb ran for the 18th district's seat in a special election caused by Republican congressman Tim Murphy's resignation and defeated Republican Rick Saccone. After Pennsylvania's congressional map was redrawn by court order the same year, Lamb won his first full term to the 17th district in the general election. He did not seek re-election to his House seat in 2022 in order to run for the 2022 United States Senate election in Pennsylvania, finishing second in the Democratic primary to eventual winner John Fetterman. Following the end of his legislative tenure, he entered private practice.

== Early life and education ==
Lamb was born in Washington, D.C., on June 27, 1984, to Thomas F. Lamb Jr. and Katie Lamb. He grew up in Mt. Lebanon, a suburb in the South Hills of Pittsburgh, and for a brief period in Connecticut. The Lamb family has been active in Pittsburgh-area politics and business for many years. Lamb's father has served as a lobbyist for PNC Financial Services since 1995. Lamb's grandfather, Thomas F. Lamb, was the Democratic Majority Leader in the Pennsylvania State Senate and later Secretary of Legislative Affairs under Governor Robert P. Casey. Conor's uncle Michael Lamb was the Controller of the City of Pittsburgh, and was previously the Prothonotary of Allegheny County, Pennsylvania.

A Roman Catholic of Irish descent, Lamb attended St. Bernard School in Mt. Lebanon, and graduated from Central Catholic High School in 2002. He graduated from the University of Pennsylvania in 2006 with a B.A. degree in political science, and earned a J.D. degree from the University of Pennsylvania Law School in 2009. He is married to Hayley Haldeman.

== Military service ==
After law school, Lamb completed the Marine Corps' Officer Candidates School before being commissioned as a Judge Advocate. In 2017, he prosecuted a Marine officer who had lied to a Marine Corps board of inquiry about a sexual misconduct case.

Lamb has been awarded the Navy and Marine Corps Commendation Medal with two gold stars, the Sea Service Ribbon, the National Defense Service Medal, and the Global War on Terrorism Service Medal.

== Assistant U.S. Attorney ==
From 2013 to 2014, Lamb clerked for Joseph Frank Bianco, a federal judge in the United States District Court for the Eastern District of New York. Following his clerkship, Lamb was appointed an Assistant United States Attorney in the United States Department of Justice's Pittsburgh office, serving under then-U.S. Attorney for the Western District of Pennsylvania David J. Hickton.

In 2015, the U.S. Attorney's Office for the Western District of Pennsylvania gained convictions against three men who were among 34 members of a heroin gang indicted in 2013 after a wiretap investigation by the FBI, the ATF, the state attorney general's office and local police. Thomas Hopes, described as the "CEO" of the violent heroin-distribution operation, was sentenced to 24 years in federal prison, and brothers Keith and Gregory Harris were sentenced to 20 years and 121 months in prison, respectively.

In 2016, the U.S. Attorney's Office gained convictions against two Pittsburgh residents, Brandon Goode and Mychael Scott, who acted as "straw buyers", purchasing firearms for a gun trafficker to help funnel hundreds of illegal weapons into New York City. Goode and Scott were sentenced to 65 and 60 months in prison, respectively. The main gun trafficker, Michael Bassier, was sentenced to 10 years in federal prison.

In 2016, Lamb prosecuted the government's case against Andre Saunders, a drug dealer from Fayette County, Pennsylvania, who imported hundreds of kilograms of cocaine and heroin from the West Coast into the Uniontown area and West Virginia and supplied heroin and cocaine to multiple dealers in the Uniontown area. Saunders was convicted of conspiracy to distribute heroin and cocaine and sentenced to 10 years in prison, and was ordered to forfeit his BMW, five luxury watches and a necklace, $325,120 in cash, his Uniontown home, the proceeds of the sale of a second Uniontown home, a 9-mm pistol, and a money judgment of $100,000.

In 2016, the U.S. Attorney's Office prosecuted Dorian Cottrell, a heroin dealer who shot a man during a drug transaction at the Cambridge Square apartments in Monroeville, Pennsylvania. Cottrell was sentenced to 15 years in federal prison and was ordered to forfeit his BMW, $27,000 in cash, and 10 firearms.

== U.S. House of Representatives ==
=== Elections ===
==== 2018 special ====
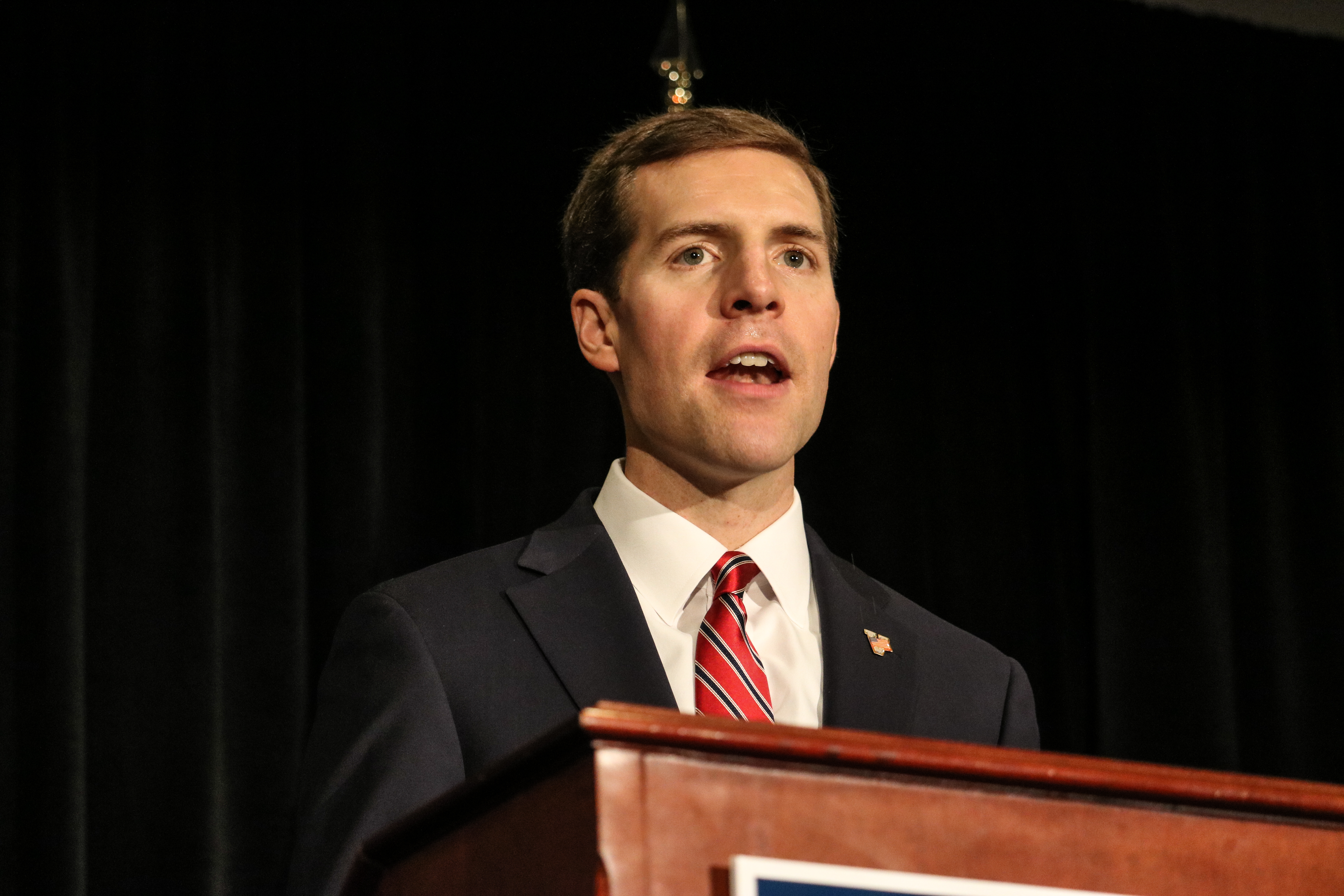
Lamb at a March 2018 rally

On October 5, 2017, the Pittsburgh Post-Gazette reported that Lamb was considering running for Congress in a special election for Pennsylvania's 18th congressional district. The district included parts of Allegheny, Greene, Washington and Westmoreland counties. The vacancy was created when incumbent Republican Representative Tim Murphy resigned amid revelations that he had had an extramarital affair and urged his mistress to terminate an unexpected pregnancy, despite his long record as a vocal opponent of abortion. Murphy had run for reelection unopposed in 2014 and 2016.

Lamb was selected as the Democratic nominee at a convention in November 2017. In the general election, he faced Republican state Representative Rick Saccone. Despite the district's Republican bent, the special election was considered highly competitive and attracted national attention. National Republican sources spent more than $8 million on television advertising, twice as much as the Democrats. Several prominent Republicans, including President Donald Trump, Vice President Mike Pence and Trump's children Donald Jr. and Ivanka, visited the district to campaign for Saccone.

During the campaign, Republicans accused Lamb of having a "weak record" as a prosecutor. FactCheck.org examined the Republicans' claims, calling them "flimsy and misleading".

On the topic of guns, Lamb called for "a stronger system of background checks but no new restrictions". On tariffs, Lamb supported President Trump's steel and aluminum tariffs. On health care, Lamb criticized the Republican attempt to repeal Obamacare and called for bipartisan efforts to stabilize its markets.

By the end of election night on March 13, 2018, Lamb led by 641 votes. When all absentee ballots were counted, Lamb led by 627 votes, with a few provisional and military ballots yet to be counted. Lamb claimed victory on Tuesday night. Early on Wednesday morning, citing the large net pickup of absentee votes for Lamb, NBC News called the race for Lamb. On Wednesday afternoon, The New York Times followed suit after concluding that Lamb's lead, while narrow, appeared "insurmountable". However, most news outlets did not declare a result, noting the closeness of the vote (just 0.2% separated the candidates) and the likelihood of a recount. However, when it became apparent that Saccone would not pick up enough votes to overtake Lamb, he called Lamb to concede the race on March 21.

Lamb's lead came primarily on the strength of winning the Allegheny County portion of the district by almost 15,400 votes. He lost the rest of the district by 14,700 votes.

After Lamb's apparent win in the special election, Republicans claimed that he won because "he ran as a conservative". This was a distinct shift from the campaign, during which Republicans said Lamb "Walks The Liberal Party Line" and chastised him for opposing the Republican 2017 tax reform bill. Lamb ran in opposition to the law, describing it as a "giveaway" to large corporations and a "betrayal" of middle-class Americans. Trump asserted that Lamb had said he "liked Trump", but there is no evidence of Lamb ever doing so. Lamb was certified as the winner on April 2, 2018, winning by 755 votes. He was sworn in by House Speaker Paul Ryan on April 12, 2018, and became the first Democrat to represent this district since 2003, when it was numbered as the 20th district.

==== 2018 general ====
After the Pennsylvania Supreme Court threw out the state's original congressional map and replaced it with a court-drawn map, the old 18th was reconfigured as the 14th district and made even more Republican on paper. Meanwhile, Lamb's home in Mt. Lebanon was drawn into the 17th district. That district had previously been the 12th, represented by three-term Republican Keith Rothfus. The district had lost much of its eastern portion, centered around Johnstown, becoming a more compact district northwest of Pittsburgh. In the process, the district lost its connection to longtime congressman John Murtha, who represented it from 1974 to 2010. While the old 12th was one of Trump's strongest districts in Pennsylvania in 2016, Trump would have only barely carried the new 17th. The new 17th also voted for Democrats in downballot races. This led to speculation that Lamb would run for a full term in the new 17th, regardless of the special election results.

On March 14, Beaver County Democratic Party chairman Stephen Dupree told ABC News that Lamb submitted a written request for county Democrats to endorse his bid for the 17th in the November 2018 general election; Beaver County is entirely within the new 17th. On March 16, Lamb announced on his Twitter account that he was in the process of gathering petitions for a run in the 17th. On March 20, he formally submitted petitions for a full term in the 17th. He was unopposed in the May 15 primary and defeated Rothfus in the general election.

==== 2020 ====
Lamb won re-election, narrowly defeating Republican Sean Parnell, an Army veteran and Trump supporter. At the same time, Joe Biden carried the district with 50.7 percent of the vote, winning by a slightly larger margin than Lamb. Biden supported Lamb as he had in 2018, and Lamb was an early endorser and surrogate for Biden's campaign in that year's presidential primary elections. Biden was the first Democrat to win the district since John Kerry won the old 12th in 2004.

=== Tenure ===
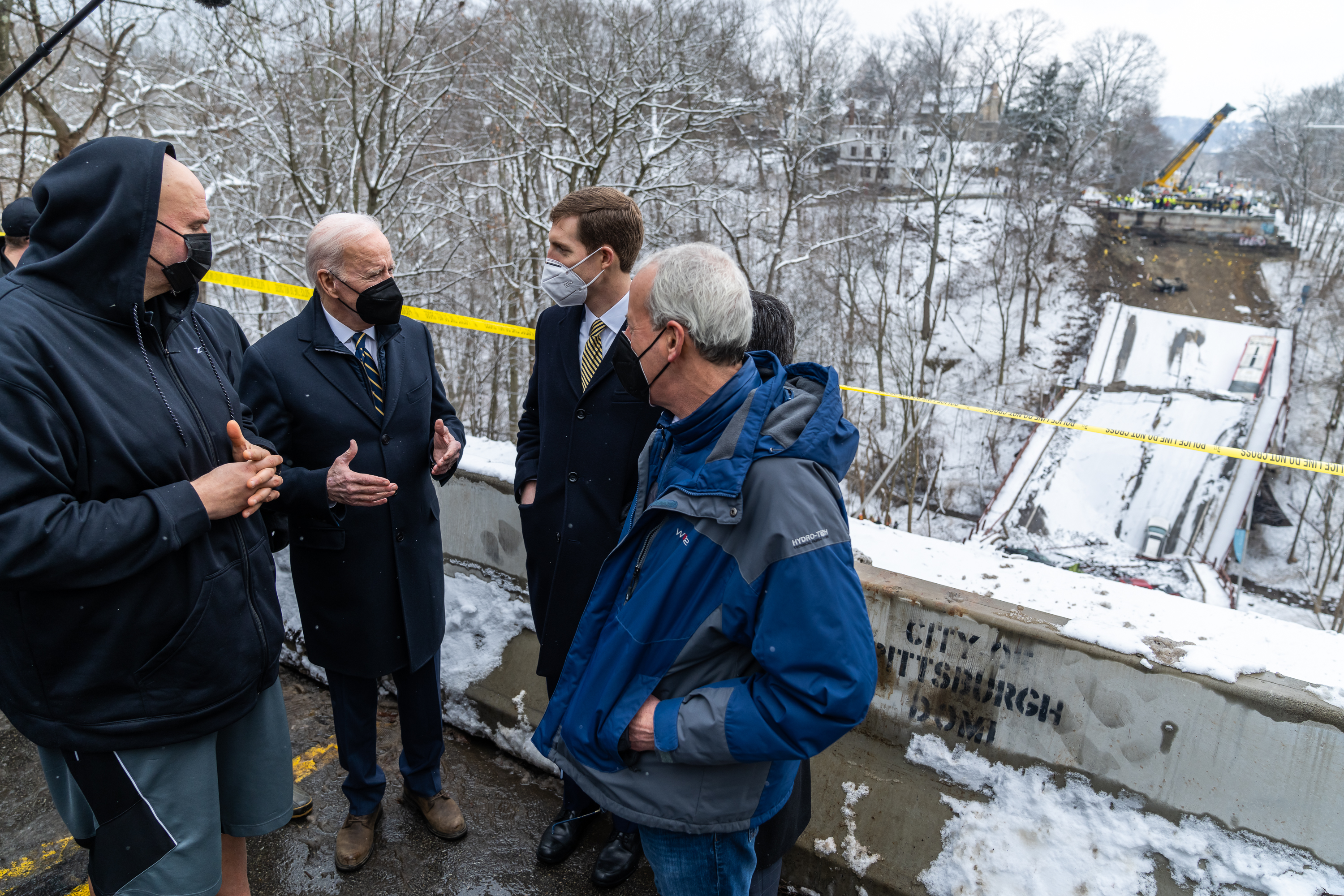
Lamb with John Fetterman and President Joe Biden in Pittsburgh

Lamb voted against Nancy Pelosi as Speaker of the House, voting instead for Joe Kennedy III, a fellow Democrat. In May 2020, Trump endorsed Lamb's 2020 election opponent while falsely claiming that Lamb had voted for Pelosi as Speaker.

On April 13, 2018, Lamb broke with most of his party and voted for the Volcker Rule Regulation Harmonization Act, which would exempt banks with less than $10 billion in assets from the Volcker Rule, which prohibits banks from making risky investments with customers' money.

On December 18, 2019, Lamb voted for both articles of impeachment against Trump.

In December 2020, Lamb broke with most of his party and voted against the MORE Act which would have removed cannabis from schedule I of the controlled substance act.

In 2020, Fortune magazine included Lamb in their '40 Under 40' listing under the "Government and Politics" category.

As of March 2022, Lamb had voted in line with Joe Biden's stated position 100% of the time.

=== Committee assignments ===
- Committee on Science, Space, and Technology
  - Subcommittee on Energy
  - Subcommittee on Research and Technology
- Committee on Veterans' Affairs
  - Subcommittee on Health
  - Subcommittee on Oversight and Investigations
- Committee on Transportation and Infrastructure
  - Subcommittee on Aviation
  - Subcommittee on Highways and Transit

=== Caucus memberships ===
- Congressional LGBT Equality Caucus
- Expand Social Security Caucus
- Congressional Steel Caucus (Chair)
- Problem Solvers Caucus

== U.S. Senate campaign ==
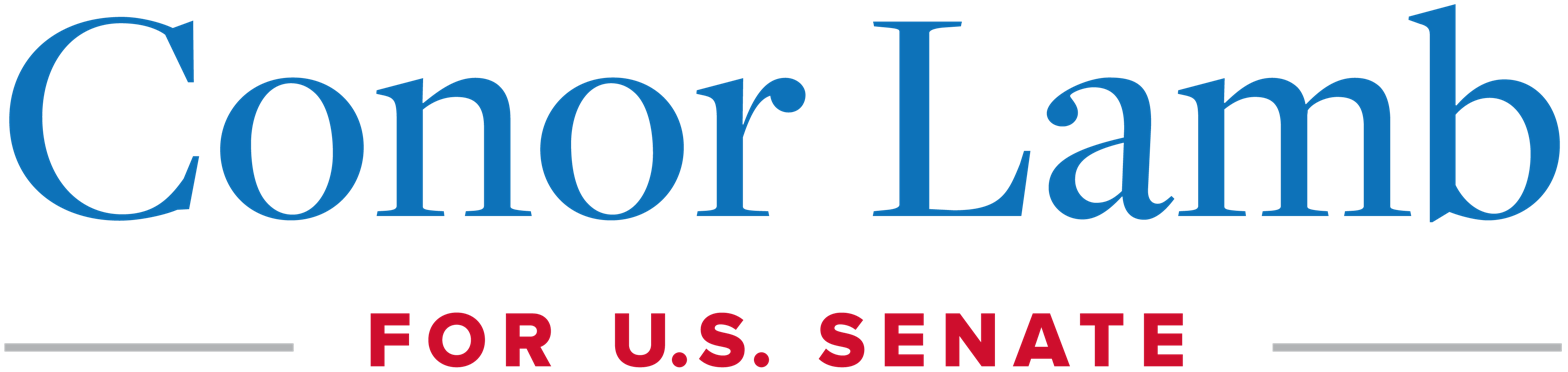
Lamb's logo for Senate campaign

On August 6, 2021, Lamb announced that he would run for the Democratic nomination for the U.S. Senate seat being vacated by retiring Senator Pat Toomey.

On May 17, 2022, Lamb lost the Democratic primary to Pennsylvania Lieutenant Governor John Fetterman, by over 30 points. Within hours after his loss, Lamb endorsed Fetterman for the general election.

== Private practice ==
In January 2023, Lamb joined the prolific law firm Kline and Specter. He soon became the lead attorney for the plaintiffs in the civil case regarding the death of Tim Piazza.

== Electoral history ==
Democratic nominating convention, 2017
Candidate	First ballot	Pct.	Second ballot	Pct.
Conor Lamb	225	40.6%	319	58.5%
Gina Cerilli	153	27.6%	152	27.9%
Pam Iovino	90	16.2%	74	13.6%
Mike Crossey	47	8.5%	Eliminated	
Rueben Brock	21	3.8%	Eliminated	
Bob Solomon	18	3.2%	Eliminated	
Keith Seewald	0	0.0%	Eliminated	

Pennsylvania's 18th congressional district special election, 2018
Party	Candidate	Votes	%	±%
Democratic	Conor Lamb	114,102	49.86%	+49.86%
Republican	Rick Saccone	113,347	49.53%	−50.47%
Libertarian	Drew Gray Miller	1,381	0.60%	+0.60%
Total votes		228,830	100.00%	
Plurality		755	0.33%	-99.67%
Democratic gain from Republican				

Pennsylvania's 17th congressional district Democratic primary, 2018
Party	Candidate	Votes	%
Democratic	Conor Lamb (incumbent)	Unopposed	
Total votes		52,508	100.0

Pennsylvania's 17th congressional district general election, 2018
Party	Candidate	Votes	%
Democratic	Conor Lamb (incumbent)	181,187	56.2
Republican	Keith Rothfus (incumbent)	141,145	43.8
Total votes		322,332	100.0
Democratic gain from Republican			

Pennsylvania's 17th congressional district Democratic primary, 2020
Party	Candidate	Votes	%
Democratic	Conor Lamb (incumbent)	Unopposed	
Total votes		111,828	100.0

Pennsylvania's 17th congressional district, 2020
Party	Candidate	Votes	%
Democratic	Conor Lamb (incumbent)	221,018	51.1%
Republican	Sean Parnell	211,115	48.9%
Total votes		432,133	100.0
Democratic hold			

United States Senate election, 2022 Democratic primary election
Party	Candidate	Votes	%
Democratic	John Fetterman	752,402	58.6
Democratic	Conor Lamb	336,933	26.3
Democratic	Malcolm Kenyatta	139,260	10.9
Democratic	Alexandria Khalil	54,351	4.2
Total votes		1,282,946	100.0

U.S. House of Representatives
Preceded by Tim Murphy	Member of the U.S. House of Representatives from Pennsylvania's 18th congressional district 2018–2019	Succeeded by Mike Doyle
Preceded by Matt Cartwright	Member of the U.S. House of Representatives from Pennsylvania's 17th congressional district 2019–2023	Succeeded by Chris Deluzio
Party political offices
Preceded by Elizabeth Warren	Keynote Speaker of the Democratic National Convention; 2020; Served alongside: Stacey Abrams, Raumesh Akbari, Colin Allred, Brendan Boyle, Yvanna Cancela, Kathleen Clyde, Nikki Fried, Robert Garcia, Malcolm Kenyatta, Marlon Kimpson, Mari Manoogian, Victoria Neave, Jonathan Nez, Sam Park, Denny Ruprecht, Randall Woodfin	Succeeded by Angela Alsobrooks
U.S. order of precedence (ceremonial)
Preceded by Ryan Costello as Former U.S. Representative	Order of precedence of the United States as Former U.S. Representative	Succeeded by Fred Keller as Former U.S. Representative
