= Eddie Bernice Johnson =

American politician (1934–2023)

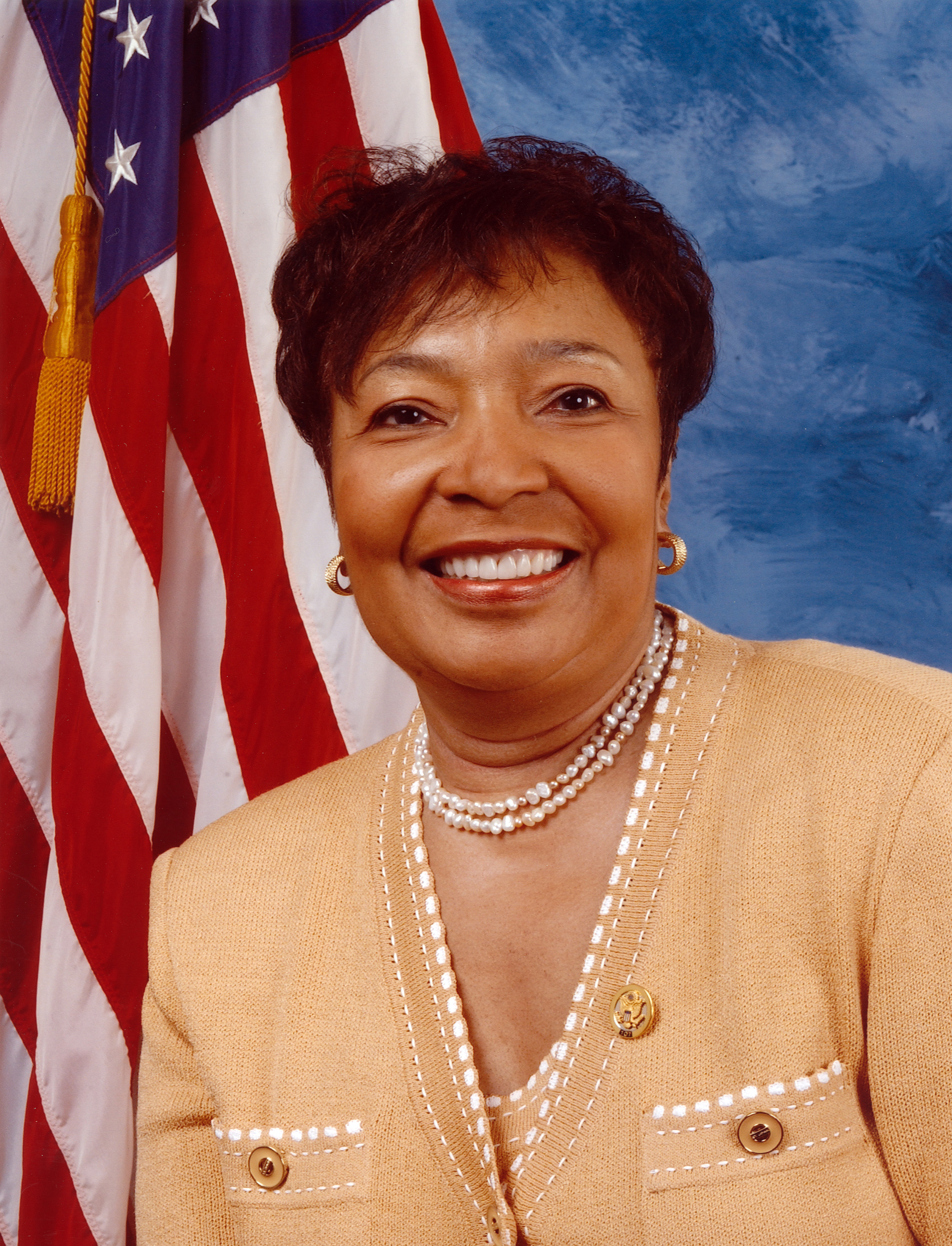
- Official portrait, 2005

Chair of the House Science Committee
- In office January 3, 2019 – January 3, 2023
- Preceded by: Lamar Smith
- Succeeded by: Frank Lucas

Member of the U.S. House of Representatives from Texas's 30th district
- In office January 3, 1993 – January 3, 2023
- Preceded by: Constituency established
- Succeeded by: Jasmine Crockett

Member of the Texas Senate from the 23rd district
- In office January 13, 1987 – January 3, 1993
- Preceded by: Oscar Mauzy
- Succeeded by: Royce West

Member of the Texas House of Representatives from the 33rd district
- In office January 9, 1973 – September 30, 1977
- Preceded by: Constituency established
- Succeeded by: Lanell Cofer

Personal details
- Born: December 3, 1934 Waco, Texas, U.S.
- Died: December 31, 2023 (aged 89) Dallas, Texas, U.S.
- Resting place: Texas State Cemetery
- Party: Democratic
- Spouse: Lacey Johnson (m. 1956; div. 1970)
- Children: 1
- Education: St Mary's College, Indiana (attended); Texas Christian University (BS); Southern Methodist University (MPA)
- Johnson's voice Johnson on World Refugee Day. Recorded June 20, 2002

Eddie Bernice Johnson (December 3, 1934 – December 31, 2023) was an American politician who represented Texas's 30th congressional district in the United States House of Representatives from 1993 to 2023. Johnson was a member of the Democratic Party.

Johnson was elected to the House in 1992, becoming the first registered nurse in Congress. At the swearing-in of the 116th United States Congress, she became dean of Texas's congressional delegation. Upon Representative Don Young's death in March 2022, Johnson became the oldest member of the House of Representatives. She retired at the end of the 117th United States Congress.

Johnson also served in the Texas House of Representatives, where she was elected in 1972 in a landslide, the first black woman to win electoral office from Dallas. She also served three terms in the Texas Senate.

== Early life, education, and medical career ==
Eddie Bernice Johnson was born in Waco, Texas, on December 3, 1934, to Edward Johnson, a tailor, and Lillie Mae White Johnson, a homemaker. She and her three siblings grew up attending Toliver Chapel Baptist Church, where her mother was an active member. Johnson had aspired to a career in medicine since childhood, and wished to become a doctor, but was told by a high school guidance counselor that this would not be possible because she was female. Johnson graduated from A.J. Moore High School at age 16, and moved to Indiana to attend Saint Mary's College of Notre Dame, where she graduated in 1955 with her nursing certificate. She transferred to Texas Christian University, from which she received a bachelor's degree in nursing. She later attended Southern Methodist University and earned a Master of Public Administration in 1976.

Johnson was the first African American to serve as Chief Psychiatric Nurse at the Dallas Veterans Administration Hospital. She entered politics after 16 years in that position.

== Early political career ==
After passage of civil-rights legislation and the Voting Rights Act of 1965, which enabled African Americans in the South to register and vote, more African Americans began to run for office and be elected. Johnson first became known in Dallas as a civil-rights activist in the 1960s.

In 1972, as an underdog candidate running for a seat in the Texas House, Johnson won a landslide victory. She was the first black woman ever elected to public office from Dallas. She soon became the first woman in Texas history to lead a major Texas House committee, the Labor Committee.

Johnson left the State House in 1977, when President Jimmy Carter appointed her as the regional director for the Department of Health, Education, and Welfare, the first African-American woman to hold this position.

Johnson entered electoral politics again in 1986, when she was elected as a Texas state senator. She was the first black state senator from Dallas since Reconstruction. Her concerns included health care, education, public housing, racial equity, economic development, and job expansion. Johnson served on the Finance Committee, for which she chaired the subcommittee on Health and Human Services, and the Education Committee. She wrote legislation to regulate diagnostic radiology centers, require drug testing in hospitals, prohibit discrimination against AIDS victims, improve access to health care for AIDS patients, and prohibit hospital kickbacks to doctors. A fair-housing advocate, she sponsored a bill to empower city governments to repair substandard housing at landlords' expense, and wrote a bill to enforce prohibitions against housing discrimination.

Johnson worked against racism while dealing with discrimination in the legislature. "Being a woman and being black is perhaps a double handicap," she told the Chicago Tribune. "When you see who's in the important huddles, who's making the important decisions, it's men." Johnson sponsored several bills aimed at equity, including a bill to establish goals for Texas to do business with "socially disadvantaged" businesses. In 1989, Johnson wrote Senate Bill 75, which created a process for investigating and settling complaints of discriminatory housing practices.

Johnson also held committee hearings and investigated complaints. In 1989, she testified in federal court about racism in Dallas's city government. In 1992, she formally asked the Justice Department to investigate harassment of local black students. That same year, she held hearings to examine discrimination charges about unfair contracting bids for the government's Superconducting Super Collider.

Johnson feared the legacy that discrimination leaves for youth. "I am frightened to see young people who believe that a racist power structure is responsible for every negative thing that happens to them," she told the New York Times. "After a point it does not matter whether these perceptions are true or false; it is the perceptions that matter."

== U.S. House of Representatives ==
=== Elections ===
Midway through her second term in the state senate, Johnson ran in the Democratic primary for the newly created 30th congressional district. She defeated Republican nominee Lucy Cain 72% to 25% in the 1992 general election, and became the first nurse elected to the United States Congress. In 1994, she defeated Cain again, 73% to 26%.

In 1996, after her district was significantly redrawn as a result of Bush v. Vera, she was reelected to a third term with 55% of the vote, the worst election performance of her congressional career. All the candidates in the race appeared on a single ballot regardless of party, and Johnson faced two other Democrats. Proving just how Democratic this district still was, the three Democrats tallied 73% of the vote.

Johnson never faced another contest nearly that close. She was reelected nine more times with at least 72% of the vote. In 2012, Johnson easily beat two opponents in the Democratic primary, State Representative Barbara Mallory Caraway and lawyer Taj Clayton, gaining 70% of the vote; she won the general election with almost 79% of the vote. She was reelected in 2014, 2016, 2018, and 2020. In October 2019, Johnson announced she would retire in 2022.

=== Tenure ===
The 17th chair of the Congressional Black Caucus, Johnson opposed the Iraq Resolution of 2002. During debate on the House floor, she stated:

I am not convinced that giving the President the authority to launch a unilateral, first-strike attack on Iraq is the appropriate course of action at this time. While I believe that under international law and under the authority of our Constitution, the United States must maintain the option to act in its own self-defense, I strongly believe that the administration has not provided evidence of an imminent threat of attack on the United States that would justify a unilateral strike. I also believe that actions alone, without exhausting peaceful options, could seriously harm global support for our war on terrorism and distract our own resources from this cause.

In 2007, House Transportation and Infrastructure Committee Chair Jim Oberstar appointed Johnson chair of its Subcommittee on Water Resources and Environment during the 110th and 111th Congresses. She was the first African American and first woman in Congress to chair this subcommittee. As Subcommittee Chair, Johnson sponsored the Water Resources Development Act of 2007. She led Congress in overriding President Bush's veto of it, the only veto override of his presidency.

During the 2008 Democratic presidential primary campaign, Johnson initially supported U.S. Senator John Edwards. After he withdrew from the race, she pledged her support as a superdelegate to Barack Obama. Her district backed Obama heavily in the election.

Johnson and Representative Donna Edwards proposed a publicly funded park on the moon to mark where the Apollo missions landed between 1969 and 1972. The Apollo Lunar Landing Legacy Act, H.R. 2617, calls for the park to be run jointly by the Department of the Interior and the National Aeronautics and Space Administration (NASA).

Johnson attended COP26 in 2021 and urged immediate climate action, warning, "Scientists have been sounding the alarm on climate for years" and "Inaction is not an option". "We are working to build a clean energy future while creating high quality jobs, and so much more", she said.

==== Armenian genocide denial ====
Johnson consistently opposed the historical consensus on the Armenian genocide. In 2009, when asked if she acknowledged the Armenian genocide, she responded "No, I don't." In 2017, when interviewed for a film and asked if she denied that the Armenian genocide occurred, Johnson replied "I do deny that." In 2019, Johnson was one of three House members to vote "present" on a resolution recognizing the Armenian genocide. The Armenian National Committee of America gave Johnson an F− rating for her voting record during the 117th congress.

==== Presidential election objections ====
In 2001, Johnson and other House members objected to counting Florida's electoral votes in the 2000 presidential election. Because no senator joined her objection, it was dismissed by Senate President Al Gore.

In 2005, Johnson was one of 31 House Democrats who voted not to count Ohio's electoral votes in the 2004 presidential election. Without Ohio's electoral votes, the election would have been decided by the U.S. House of Representatives, with each state having one vote, in accordance with the Twelfth Amendment to the United States Constitution.

Johnson voted to certify Joe Biden's win in the 2020 presidential election. Johnson called the 2021 United States Capitol attack "like a real war".

==== Scholarship violations ====
In August 2010, Amy Goldson, counsel for the Congressional Black Caucus Foundation, said that Johnson violated organizational rules by awarding at least 15 scholarships to relatives of her own or to children of her district director, Rod Givens. The awards violated an anti-nepotism rule and the recipients did not qualify for the scholarships because they were not residents of Johnson's district. Johnson said she "unknowingly" made a mistake in awarding the grants and would work with the foundation to rectify it.

Opponent Stephen Broden released letters bearing Johnson's signature in which she requested that the scholarship check be made out to and sent directly to her relatives, instead of to the destination university as would normally be done. The Dallas Morning News ran an editorial questioning her changing story on the matter, saying that it was overshadowing her service in the House.

=== Committees ===
In December 2010, Johnson became the first African American and the first female Ranking Member of the House Committee on Science, Space and Technology. From 2000 to 2002, she was the Ranking Member of the Subcommittee on Research and Science Education. Johnson has been a strong advocate of investing in science, technology, engineering and math (STEM) education. In 2012, she introduced the Broadening Participation in STEM Education Act, which would authorize the Director of the National Science Foundation (NSF) to award grants to increase the number of students from underrepresented minority groups receiving STEM degrees. The bill would also expand the number of faculty members from underrepresented minority groups at colleges and universities.

=== Committee assignments ===
- Committee on Science and Technology (chair)
- Committee on Transportation and Infrastructure
  - Subcommittee on Aviation
  - Subcommittee on Highways and Transit
  - Subcommittee on Water Resources and Environment

=== Caucus memberships ===
- Congressional Arts Caucus
- Congressional Black Caucus
- Congressional Tri Caucus (founder)
- Congressional Taiwan Caucus
- Congressional Progressive Caucus
- Rare Disease Congressional Caucus
- Congressional Cement Caucus
- Congressional NextGen 9-1-1 Caucus
- U.S.-Japan Caucus

== Personal life and death ==
Johnson was a member of Alpha Kappa Alpha sorority and The Links. In 1956, she married educator Lacey Kirk Johnson. They had one child, a son. The marriage ended in divorce in 1970.

Johnson died in Dallas on December 31, 2023, at the age of 89, shortly after being admitted into hospice care. She reportedly died of a spinal infection while recovering from spinal surgery. Three days later, her family announced plans to file a lawsuit against her health-care providers, claiming medical negligence was responsible for her death. In June 2024, the lawsuit was settled. She was buried in the Texas State Cemetery in Austin, Texas.

== Legacy ==
Dallas Independent School District opened an elementary school in Wilmer, Texas, named after Johnson, in 2020.

Dallas Union Station is officially known as "Eddie Bernice Johnson Union Station" after Johnson.

== See also ==
- List of African-American United States representatives
- Women in the United States House of Representatives

U.S. House of Representatives
New constituency	Member of the U.S. House of Representatives from Texas's 30th congressional district 1993–2023	Succeeded by Jasmine Crockett
Preceded by Jim Clyburn	Chair of the Congressional Black Caucus; 2001–2003	Succeeded by Elijah Cummings
Preceded by Ralph Hall	Ranking Member of the House Science Committee; 2011–2019	Succeeded by Frank Lucas
Preceded by Lamar Smith	Chair of the House Science Committee; 2019–2023	Succeeded by Frank Lucas
Honorary titles
Preceded by Don Young	Oldest member of the U.S. House of Representatives; 2022–2023	Succeeded by Grace Napolitano
