= GI Bill Tuition Fairness Act of 2013 =

Bill of the 113th U.S. Congress

- Long title: To amend title 38, United States Code, to require courses of education provided by public institutions of higher education that are approved for purposes of the educational assistance programs administered by the Secretary of Veterans Affairs to charge veterans tuition and fees at the in-State tuition rate.
- Announced in: the 113th United States Congress
- Sponsored by: Rep. Jeff Miller (R, FL-1)
- Number of co-sponsors: 1

Codification
- U.S.C. sections affected: 38 U.S.C. § 3679, 38 U.S.C. ch. 36
- Agencies affected: United States Department of Veterans Affairs

Legislative history
- Introduced in the House as H.R. 357 by Rep. Jeff Miller (R, FL-1) on January 23, 2013; Committee consideration by United States House Committee on Veterans' Affairs, United States Senate Committee on Veterans' Affairs; Passed the House on February 3, 2014 (Roll Call Vote 33: 390-0)

The G.I. Bill Tuition Fairness Act of 2013 (H.R. 357) is a bill that would require colleges to charge veterans the in-state tuition rates regardless of whether they meet the residency requirement. The bill also makes several other changes related to veterans benefits, such as extending the time period during which veterans are eligible for job training. The bill passed the House of Representatives on February 4, 2014 during the 113th United States Congress.

== Background ==
Since World War II, the United States has provided benefits for veterans explained in the G.I. Bill and its subsequent amendments. One of those benefits is college tuition. Education benefits for people who served in the military after 9/11 were expanded in the Post-9/11 Veterans Educational Assistance Act of 2008. 1.5 million veterans have used this law to pay for college since then. The bill covers the cost of in-state tuition, but not the cost of out-of-state tuition, forcing veterans to pay the difference or spend a lot of time (up to a year) waiting to meet the residency requirement of that state. Average in-state tuition in the United States is around $9,000, while average out-of-state tuition is close to $22,000.

In November 2013, there were 20 U.S. states that already had laws offering veterans in-state tuition regardless of their residency status, and 9 more states considering it.

== Provisions of the bill ==
This summary is based largely on the summary provided by the Congressional Research Service, a public domain source.

The GI Bill Tuition Fairness Act of 2013 would direct the Secretary of Veterans Affairs (VA), for purposes of the educational assistance programs administered by the Secretary, to disapprove courses of education provided by a public educational institution that does not charge tuition and fees for veterans at the same rate that is charged for in-state residents, regardless of the veteran's state of residence. It would provide for the treatment of veterans enrolled in courses at such institutions before July 1, 2015.

Section 4 would extend through FY2018 the authorization of appropriations for: (1) a monthly assistance allowance to disabled veterans training or competing for the Paralympic Team; and (2) grants to U.S. Paralympics, Inc.

Section 6 would make eligible under VA homeless veterans reintegration program those homeless veterans who are: (1) participating in the VA supported housing program for which rental assistance is provided under the United States Housing Act of 1937, and (2) veterans who are transitioning from being incarcerated.

Section 7 would extend from 12 to 17 years after discharge or release from active-duty service the authorized period for veterans with service-connected disabilities to enroll in certain VA vocational training and rehabilitation programs.

Section 8 would reauthorize through June 30, 2018 (under current law, the authorization expires as of June 30, 2013) certain qualifying work-study activities for individuals receiving educational assistance through the VA.

Section 9 would set forth the responsibilities of each Director and Assistant Director of Veterans' Employment and Training (assigned to each state by the Secretary from among personnel within the Veterans' Employment and Training Service), including: (1) monitoring the performance of veterans' training and employment programs, with special emphasis on services to disabled veterans; (2) addressing program performance deficiencies and establishing higher performance goals; and (3) reviewing program funding and assisting with funding requests.

Section 10 would amend provisions concerning the Transition Assistance Program of the United States Department of Defense (DOD) (employment and job training assistance and related services for members of the Armed Forces being separated from active duty and their spouses) to require such Program to include: (1) information about disability-related employment and education protections, (2) instruction in the use of educational assistance entitlements, (3) testing to determine academic readiness for post-secondary education and appropriate courses, (4) instruction on the financing of post-secondary education, and (5) information on benefits provided under laws administered by the Secretary of Veterans Affairs (VA) and in other subjects determined by the Secretary concerned.

It would also require the VA Secretary to submit to the congressional veterans committees the results of a study to determine the feasibility of providing veterans' benefits instruction at all overseas locations where such instruction is provided through a joint contract with the Secretary of Labor.

Section 11 would amend the VOW to Hire Heroes Act of 2011 to extend through June 30, 2014, the veterans retraining assistance program. Directs the Secretary to submit to Congress an interim report on the retraining assistance provided under such program.

Section 12 would amend the Secretary to increase, as of December 1, 2013, the rates of veterans' disability compensation, additional compensation for dependents, the clothing allowance for certain disabled veterans, and dependency and indemnity compensation for surviving spouses and children. Requires each such increase to be the same percentage as the increase in benefits provided under title II (Old Age, Survivors and Disability Insurance) of the Social Security Act, on the same effective date.

Section 13 would prohibit the Secretary from paying any performance award to a VA Senior Executive Service employee during FY2014-FY2018.

== Congressional Budget Office report ==
This summary is based largely on the summary provided by the Congressional Budget Office, as ordered reported by the House Committee on Veterans’ Affairs on May 8, 2013. This is a public domain source.

H.R. 357 would: modify the monthly rates payable to veterans, their dependents, and survivors for disability compensation and dependency and indemnity compensation; amend the approval criteria for educational institutions at which veterans may use their education benefits; and make other changes to programs administered by the Department of Veterans Affairs (VA), the Department of Defense (DoD), and the United States Department of Labor (DOL).

If enacted, the Congressional Budget Office (CBO) estimates that, on net, the bill would decrease direct spending by $139 million over the 2014-2018 period and by $347 million over the 2014-2023 period. Because the bill would affect direct spending, pay-as-you-go procedures apply. Enacting H.R. 357 would not affect revenues.

In addition, the CBO estimates that implementing H.R. 357 would have a discretionary cost of $132 million over the 2014-2018 period, assuming appropriation of the estimated amounts.

H.R. 357 contains no intergovernmental or private-sector mandates as defined in the Unfunded Mandates Reform Act (UMRA).

== Procedural history ==
The GI Bill Tuition Fairness Act of 2013 was introduced into the United States House of Representatives on January 23, 2013 by Rep. Jeff Miller (R, FL-1). It was referred to the United States House Committee on Veterans' Affairs. It was reported out of committee alongside House Report 113-94. On February 3, 2014, the House voted in Roll Call Vote 33 to pass the bill 390-0. It was received in the United States Senate and referred to the United States Senate Committee on Veterans' Affairs on February 4, 2014.

== Debate and discussion ==
Rep. Jeff Miller supported the bill, saying that GI education benefits should reflect the fact that "the men and women who served this nation did not just defend the citizens of their home states, but the citizens of all 50 states."

Supporters of allowing veterans to have in-state tuition argue that such a move will benefit the schools as well as the veterans. The schools would benefit by "having the kind of leadership and the kind of character in the classroom that a veteran will bring" according to Heather Fitzenhagen, a state representative in Florida working on a state level bill on this issue.

The group Student Veterans of America supports the bill, arguing that "having that across-the-board ease with all 50 states and the District of Columbia will make it easier for student veterans to figure out how much they will be paying for their college education." The Military Officers Association of America also supports the bill. MOAA President Vice Adm. Norbert R. Ryan Jr., USN (Ret) said that the bill is "a practical, cost-saving approach that allows our returning warriors more options to take advantage of the Post-9/11 GI Bill and other GI bill programs."

== See also ==
- List of bills in the 113th United States Congress
- G.I. Bill
- College tuition in the United States
- Veterans Paralympic Act of 2013 (H.R. 1402; 113th Congress)
