= H.R. 2189 (113th Congress) =

- Long title: To establish a commission or task force to evaluate the backlog of disability claims of the Department of Veterans Affairs.
- Announced in: the 113th United States Congress
- Sponsored by: Jeff Miller (R, FL-1)
- Number of co-sponsors: 1

Codification
- U.S.C. sections affected: 5 U.S.C. § 5316, 5 U.S.C. ch. 53, 5 U.S.C. ch. 51, 5 U.S.C. ch. 57, 5 U.S.C. § 3109, and others.
- Agencies affected: United States Congress, United States House of Representatives, U.S. Court of Appeals for the Federal Circuit, Executive Office of the President, United States Department of Veterans Affairs, Veterans Benefits Administration, United States Department of Defense

Legislative history
- Introduced in the House as H.R. 2189 by Rep. Jeff Miller (R, FL-1) on May 23, 2013; Committee consideration by United States House Committee on Veterans' Affairs, United States House Veterans' Affairs Subcommittee on Disability Assistance and Memorial Affairs

H.R. 2189 is a bill creating a task force in the United States Department of Veterans Affairs that would be responsible for evaluating the backlog of veterans' disability claims. The task force would look at the current method of processing them, the appeals process, and related laws and regulations, then make their own recommendations on how to improve the process. The Secretary of Veterans Affairs would be required to either implement all or some of their recommendations and justify any not implemented to Congress. The bill was introduced into the United States House of Representatives during the 113th United States Congress.

== Provisions of the bill ==
This summary is based largely on the summary provided by the Congressional Research Service, a public domain source.

H.R. 2189 would establish within the United States Department of Veterans Affairs (VA) a commission or task force. The task force would evaluate the backlog of veterans' disability claims, including the current process used by the Secretary of Veterans Affairs to evaluate claims and appeals, the applicable laws and regulations, and the appeals process. It would also analyze possible improvements to the claims process and submit to the Secretary remedies and solutions for such backlog. The bill would require the Secretary to implement such remedies and solutions as the Secretary determines appropriate and to submit to Congress a justification regarding those not implemented.

== Congressional Budget Office report ==
This summary is based largely on the summary provided by the Congressional Budget Office, as ordered reported by the House Committee on Veterans’ Affairs on August 1, 2013. It is a public domain source.

H.R. 2189 would modify several programs administered by the Department of Veterans Affairs (VA) including those providing disability compensation and pensions to veterans. Also, the bill would require the VA to establish a commission to review the backlog of claims for disability compensation and the process for appealing the denial of such claims, and would require the commission to submit a number of reports to the Congress.

The Congressional Budget Office (CBO) estimates that enacting H.R. 2189 would decrease net direct spending by $412 million over the 2014-2018 period and by $471 million over the 2014-2023 period. Because enacting the legislation would affect direct spending, pay-as-you-go procedures apply. The CBO also estimates that implementing H.R. 2189 would have a discretionary cost of $126 million over the 2014-2018 period, assuming appropriation of the necessary amounts.

H.R. 2189 would impose an intergovernmental mandate as defined in the Unfunded Mandates Reform Act (UMRA) by preempting state licensing laws governing health care professionals in some circumstances. The CBO estimates that the costs of the intergovernmental mandate would be small and would not exceed the threshold established in UMRA ($75 million in 2013, adjusted annually for inflation). The bill contains no private-sector mandates as defined in UMRA.

== Procedural history ==
=== House ===
The bill was introduced on May 23, 2013 by Rep. Jeff Miller (R, FL-1). It was referred to the United States House Committee on Veterans' Affairs and the United States House Veterans' Affairs Subcommittee on Disability Assistance and Memorial Affairs. The subcommittee held hearings about the bill on June 28, 2013 and markedup the bill on July 17, 2013. The full committee ordered the bill to be reported (amended) by voice vote on August 1, 2013. The bill was accompanied by House Report 113-236.

On October 25, 2013, House Majority Leader Eric Cantor announced that H.R. 1742 would be on the House schedule for the week of October 28, 2013. It was scheduled for a vote on October 28, 2013 under a suspension of the rules. The House was expected to deal with six different bills related to Veterans all on the same day, including this bill.

== Debate and discussion ==
The Association of the United States Navy included H.R. 2189 in a list of bills related to veterans that they were pleased about and supported.

In a newsletter from August 9, 2013, a local chapter of the Veterans of Foreign Wars expressed their concern with H.R. 2189, noting that they "believe that 6 months is too short a time period for commission members to adequately learn and understand the disability benefit programs administered by VA, let alone propose substantive recommendations that would improve claims processing without harming veterans."

== See also ==
- List of bills in the 113th United States Congress
- United States Department of Veterans Affairs
