= Chapter 33 =

Chapter 33 refers to a 33rd chapter in a book.

Chapter Thirty-Three, Chapter 33, or Chapter XXXIII may also refer to:

== Television ==
- "Chapter 33" (House of Cards)
- "Chapter Thirty-Three" (Boston Public)
- "Chapter Thirty-Three: Deus Ex Machina", an episode of Chilling Adventures of Sabrina
- "Chapter Thirty-Three: Shadow of a Doubt", an episode of Riverdale

== Other uses ==
- Chapter 33 (G.I. Bill of Rights)
