= Post-9/11 Veterans Educational Assistance Act of 2008 =

United States law

Post-9/11 GI Bill
- Other short titles: Post-9/11 Veterans Educational Assistance Act of 2008, Supplemental Appropriations Act of 2008
- Long title: An Act making appropriations for military construction, the Department of Veterans Affairs, and related agencies for the fiscal year ending September 30, 2008, and for other purposes
- Enacted by: the 110th United States Congress
- Effective: June 30, 2008

Citations
- Public law: 110-252
- Statutes at Large: 122 Stat. 2323 (2008)

Legislative history
- Introduced in the House of Representatives as H.R. 2642 by Chet Edwards (D–TX) on June 11, 2007; Committee consideration by United States House Committee on Appropriations; Passed the House on June 15, 2007 (Yeas: 409; Nays: 2); Passed the Senate on September 6, 2007 (Yeas: 92; Nays: 1); Signed into law by President George W. Bush on June 30, 2008

United States Supreme Court cases
- Rudisill v. McDonough, No. 22-888, 601 U.S. ___ (2024)

The Post-9/11 Veterans Educational Assistance Act of 2008 is Title V of the Supplemental Appropriations Act of 2008, Pub. L. 110–252 (text) (PDF), H.R. 2642, an Act of Congress which became law on June 30, 2008. The act amended Part III of Title 38, United States Code to include a new Chapter 33, which expands the educational benefits for military veterans who have served since September 11, 2001. At various times the new education benefits have been referred to as the Post-9/11 GI Bill, the 21st Century G.I. Bill of Rights, or the Webb G.I. Bill, with many current references calling it simply the new G.I. Bill. President George W. Bush signed H.R. 2642 into law on June 30, 2008.

The law is an effort to pay for veterans' college expenses to a similar extent that the original G.I. Bill did after World War II. The main provisions of the act include funding 100% of a public four-year undergraduate education to a veteran who has served three years on active duty since September 11, 2001. The act also provides the ability for the veteran to transfer benefits to a spouse or children after serving (or agreeing to serve) ten years.

This bill was written, introduced and guided to passage by Senator Jim Webb of Virginia, who introduced it on his first day in the Senate in January 2007. Webb's hope was that these benefits would help current veterans as much as the original G.I. Bill helped the Greatest Generation in shaping America.

The original Post-9/11 GI Bill's provisions went into effect on August 1, 2009.

In 2017, according to CBS News, approximately 40 percent of all GI Bill funds were distributed to for-profit colleges.

== Overview ==
The Post-9/11 Veterans Educational Assistance Act of 2008 improves educational benefits for certain individuals serving on active duty in the Armed Forces on or after September 11, 2001.

The main benefits include:

- Four academic years (36 months) of educational tuition benefits for an approved program up to the cost of the most expensive in-state undergraduate public tuition in the state the Veteran enrolls, currently, ranging from approximately $3,500 in Wyoming to over $450,000 in Utah Southern Utah University Professional Pilot Program helicopter side. The amount received depends on the number of months the veteran served on active-duty service on or after September 11, 2001. The minimum requirement is service of at least 90 days, which entitles the veteran to 40% of the educational benefit.
- Additional tuition at more expensive private schools under the "Yellow Ribbon" program allows participating institutions to share the cost (as of 2008, one to one) with the federal government up to 100% of the expense.
- A monthly living stipend based on housing costs of a service member of pay grade E-5 with dependents, based on zip code of learning institution. This rate varies greatly nationwide; the current rate for New York City is $2,744, while the same rate for El Paso, TX is $917. Veterans attending schools online or through correspondence will not receive this benefit if their entire enrollment is in distance or online learning. The veteran will be entitled to the stipend if at least one course is classified as "in-residence".
- For veterans who left active duty before January 1, 2013, benefits are available for up to 15 years following separation (in contrast to the 10-year limit under the Montgomery GI Bill). Veterans discharged on or after January 1, 2013, have no expiration date for using their benefits, due to the provisions of the Forever GI Bill.
- International education programs outside the US are eligible. (US national computation for institutions without a US Campus)
- Elimination of the $1,200 program enrollment fee paid by the veteran at the beginning of military service currently required by the Montgomery G.I. Bill. There is also a one-time payment of additional assistance, paid concurrently with the disbursement of the final month of benefits, which refunds either all or portions of the original $1,200 enrollment fee; the refund amount depends both on the amount contributed, up to $1,200, multiplied by the percentile balance of remaining benefits when electing to convert to Chapter 33.
- An annual stipend to cover other education costs (e.g., books, supplies, fees) of up to $1,000.
- Up to $2,000 towards one-time licensing or certification test, not charged against the 36-month entitlement.

=== GI Bill Comparison Tool, GI Bill Feedback System, and college choice ===
The Department of Veterans Affairs maintains a website for veterans to compare colleges that use the GI Bill, in order to use their educational benefits wisely. VA also has a GI Bill Feedback System for veterans to lodge their complaints about schools they are attending.

=== 2010 changes ===
In December 2010 Congress passed the Post-9/11 Veterans Education Assistance Improvements Act of 2010. The new law, often referred to as GI Bill 2.0, expands eligibility for members of the National Guard to include time served on Title 32 or in the full-time Active Guard and Reserve (AGR).

The new law also includes a new (reduced) housing stipend for online (distance) learners; enables active-duty servicemembers and their GI Bill eligible spouses to receive the annual $1,000 book stipend; adds several vocational, certification and OJT options and removes the state-by-state tuition caps for veterans enrolled at public (state-operated) colleges and universities.

In addition the so-called GI Bill 2.0 includes a new $17,500 a year cap on tuition and fees coverage for veterans attending private universities, prorates the housing stipend based on the student's rate of pursuit, and removes the "interval pay" which allowed veterans to continue to receive payments during scheduled school breaks (i.e. winter and spring breaks).

The bulk of these changes go into effect August and October 2011.

The eligibility requirements include:

- Completion of a secondary school diploma (or its equivalent) before applying for such assistance.
- Active duty service (Note: In the case of members of the reserve components of the Armed Forces, service on active duty under a call or order to active duty under section 688, 12301(a), 12301(d), 12301(g), 12302, or 12304 of title 10.) on or after September 11, 2001 of 36 months for full benefits, and 3 to 35 months for partial benefits.
- Active Duty soldiers who opted to enroll in the College Loan Repayment Program will receive the new GI Bill benefits. However, the amount of time of enlistment used to fulfill the College Loan Repayment Program requirement (typically the first three to four years of service) will not count toward the time of service required to qualify for the new benefits.

The transferability provisions may include, depending on final regulations currently being drafted by the DoD (in consultation with the VA and Coast Guard):

- Servicemembers with six years of active duty service, with a commitment to serve an additional four years, may transfer benefits to their spouse.
- Servicemembers with over ten years of service may transfer benefits to a child.

=== 2011 changes ===
Beginning in August 2011. the Department of Veterans affairs would only cover up to $17,500 a year at private schools, and would only pay "the actual net cost for in-State tuition and fees assessed" by public schools. Due to the differing residency rules from state to state, this has caused some veterans who utilize the Post 9/11 GI Bill, to pay the difference. Due to this discrepancy a bipartisan bill, the GI Bill Tuition Fairness Act, has been introduced in the 113th Congress.

Although the original Bill did not include National Guard state activation, effective October 1, 2011, the law was expanded to "include Active Service performed by National Guard members under title 32 U.S.C. for the purpose of organizing, administering, recruiting, instructing, or training the National Guard; or under section 502(f) for the purpose of responding to a national emergency."

=== Proposed 2014 changes ===
On February 3, 2014, the United States House of Representatives passed the GI Bill Tuition Fairness Act of 2013 (H.R. 357; 113th Congress). If enacted, the bill would require states to offer veterans the in-state tuition price instead of the out-of-state tuition price regardless of whether the veteran met the residency requirement. The bill would also make other changes to veterans' benefits.

== Federal Student Aid Application ==
Students, regardless of whether Post-9/11 GI Bill benefits pay all or some of college costs, may obtain additional financial aid for education by preparing a federal student aid application (FAFSA). The amount of military aid a student receives for a college education does not defer eligibility or reduce the amount of student aid that student could receive from the four federal grant programs - Pell, SMART, ACG, and TEACH - and many of the state student aid programs.

== Section breakdown ==
- Section 3311: Educational assistance for service in the Armed Forces after September 11, 2001 - Entitlement. This section prescribes multiple categories of veterans entitled to educational benefits under this Act. In general, to qualify, veterans must have served at least 90 days of active duty, with at least some period of active duty time served on or after September 11, 2001.
- Section 3312: Educational assistance - Duration. Veterans are entitled to receive educational assistance for a period of time that is linked to their entitlement, as measured by Section 3311 above. In general, veterans may not receive assistance for more than a total of 36 months, which equals 4 academic years.
- Section 3313: Educational assistance - Payment and amount. In general, veterans may receive monetary assistance to pursue an approved program of education as follows: (i) payments covering the established charges of the program, (ii) a housing stipend based on a servicemember of pay grade E-5 with dependants in the area of the educational institution (iii) an annual stipend of $1,000. This Section prescribes the timing of such payments and revised payment guidelines related to less-than-half-time education, apprenticeships, on-the-job-training, correspondence school, and flight training.
- Section 3314: Tutorial assistance. Veterans may receive additional payment for tutorial assistance, not to exceed $100/month, for a maximum of 12 months, or until a maximum of $1,200 is used.
- Section 3315: Licensure and certification tests. Veterans may receive payment for one licensing or certification test, not to exceed the lesser of $2,000 or the test fee.
- Section 3317: Public-private contributions for additional educational assistance. Establishes a system where private colleges and universities can voluntarily participate in the program. The government will pay up to 50% of the cost greater than the most expensive public program.
- Section 3319: Authority to transfer unused education benefits to family members. Allows transfer of a veteran's unused benefits to 1) a spouse after six years of service with an agreement to serve at least four more years and/or 2) a child after ten years of service.
- Section 3321: Time limitation for use of and eligibility for entitlement. Veterans have 15 years (as measured under the provisions of this Section) to use their educational entitlement.
- Section 3322: Bar to duplication of educational assistance benefits. Veterans who receive educational benefits under this Act may not receive concurrent assistance under another similar program; instead, veterans must elect one program over another.
- Section 3324: Allocation of administration and costs. Besides addressing administrative items, this section also prescribes ways for veterans to choose to elect into this Act's program from the existing Montgomery G.I. Bill program.

== Controversies ==
Although the bill is widely considered an important piece of legislation, some flaws in the new GI Bill have been noted.

Perhaps the largest controversy has been the distribution of GI Bill funds to for-profit colleges. In 2014, CBS News reported that eight of the top ten schools for GI Bill funding were for-profit colleges, including the collapsing Corinthian Colleges, which ceased operations the following year.

In 2019, NBC News reported that reduced oversight of for-profit colleges would lead to greater power for for-profit schools to prey on veterans. The report highlighted abuses by Ashford University, Full Sail University, University of Phoenix, and Colorado Technical University.

== Legislative history ==
Senator Jim Webb (D-VA), a decorated Vietnam veteran and former Secretary of the Navy, originally introduced the Senate bill the day after he was sworn in (on January 5, 2007) as S. 22. His principal co-sponsors included military veterans Chuck Hagel (R-NE), Frank Lautenberg (D-NJ), and John Warner (R-VA). A House companion bill was introduced by Representative Bobby Scott (D-VA). On September 12, 2007, the bill became a bipartisan initiative when Senator Olympia Snowe (R-ME) cosponsored the bill.

After earlier passing the House and Senate in different forms in May 2008 mainly with support from Democrats and a few Republicans, a bipartisan deal was brokered and the bill passed as an amendment to H.R. 2642, the FY08 Supplemental Appropriations Bill, commonly referred to as the War Funding Bill.

On June 19, 2008 the veteran education assistance benefits, along with 13-week unemployment benefit extension, passed as an amendment with a vote of 416-12. On June 26, the Senate voted 92-6 in favor of the final version of the bill. President George W. Bush signed H.R. 2642 into law on June 30, 2008.

== Bill supporters ==
Prior to passage, the bill received support from many Nationwide Organizations such as The American Legion, AMVETS, Veterans of Foreign Wars (VFW), Iraq and Afghanistan Veterans of America (IAVA), the Disabled American Veterans (DAV), the Paralyzed Veterans of America (PVA), and the Student Veterans of America (SVA).

== Bill opponents ==
A Congressional Budget Office report that had been cited by opponents states that retention will drop by 16%, while proponents counter that the same study predicts recruitment will be up by 16% due to the new incentives this bill would create. Senator Webb also pointed out that currently, "recent studies show that 70% of all enlisted members get out at or before their initial enlistment."

While President Bush had initially threatened to veto the bill, in early June 2008 the White House signaled he might be willing to sign it along with the National Defense Authorization Act for Fiscal Year 2009. He wanted to see transferability between spouses and dependents added onto the new G.I. Bill, making it more valuable to career military personnel that would like to pay for their spouse or child's education. On June 19, 2008 this provision was added to the war funding bill and President Bush indicated he would sign such a bill. This provision already existed with respect to the Montgomery GI Bill for regular servicemembers (the MGIB-AD).

== Presidential candidates' positions ==
Among the bill's initial opponents was Republican presidential hopeful, Senator John McCain of Arizona, who had introduced a competing bill. Sen. McCain's bill would have increased the basic education benefit by the current G.I. Bill by almost $3,000 a year and added another $4,200 a year for service members who stayed in the military for at least 12 years. With the added transferability provisions for continued military service, Sen. McCain came to support the bill because it was changed to encourage additional service beyond three years, mitigating his earlier concerns. Sen. McCain, who had not voted in the Senate since April 8, was campaigning in Ohio on June 26 and was not present for the final senate vote on the bill. The only other senator not voting was Sen. Ted Kennedy, who was recovering after surgery to remove a brain tumor.

Then-United States Senator from Illinois and Democratic presidential hopeful Barack Obama, who had expressed early support for the Webb version of the veteran education benefits, voted for the final bill on June 26.

=== 2008 U.S. Presidential campaign issue ===
In May 2008 the issue became a campaign issue with both candidates attacking the others' position.

During Senate debate on the bill, Senator Obama made the following comment:

I respect Senator John McCain's service to our country. ... but I can't understand why he would line up behind the president in opposition to this G.I. bill. I can't believe he believes it is too generous to our veterans. I could not disagree with him and the president more on this issue. There are many issues that lend themselves to partisan posturing but giving our veterans the chance to go to college should not be one of them.

Senator McCain responded in a written statement:

I will not accept from Senator Obama, who did not feel it was his responsibility to serve our country in uniform, any lectures on my regard for those who did. It would be easier politically for me to have joined Senator Webb in offering his legislation. More importantly, I feel just as he does, that we owe veterans the respect and generosity of a great nation because no matter how generously we show our gratitude it will never compensate them fully for all the sacrifices they have borne on our behalf. Perhaps, if Senator Obama would take the time and trouble to understand this issue he would learn to debate an honest disagreement respectfully. But, as he always does, he prefers impugning the motives of his opponent, and exploiting a thoughtful difference of opinion to advance his own ambitions. If that is how he would behave as president, the country would regret his election.

== Effectiveness of the GI Bill ==
A 2021 study published by the National Bureau of Economic Research (NBER) indicates that the post-911 GI Bill has had limited value, and in some cases may be less valuable for veterans than working after leaving military service. According to the authors "All veterans who were already enrolled in college at the time of bill passage increase their months of schooling, but only for those in public institutions did this translate into increases in bachelor’s degree attainment and longer-run earnings. For specific groups of students, large subsidies can modestly help degree completion but harm long run earnings due to lost labor market experience."

The study concluded that the decrease in earnings was likely driven by the fact that it pushed many underqualified and overqualified veterans to pursue higher education. At the lower end of the spectrum it notes that, "The Korea and Vietnam eras involved conscription, which likely included large groups of young men who were well-suited to college-going and further education. In contrast, the PGIB was implemented for an all-volunteer Army, and so is offered to a group of young women and men who chose the military over college after leaving high school." It also notes that many veterans leave the military with sufficient technical skills that they would be better served by using these skills than pursuing high education, "the largest negative effects of the program accrue to the least skilled veterans – measured by their military job experience and AFQT scores – and that these are the groups to see the largest overall enrollment increase, with much of that increase concentrated in for-profit institutions at the expense of enrollments in four-year public institutions. By pursuing schooling of marginal value, veterans may be missing out on opportunities to build occupation- or firm-specific human capital, or to immediately put their Army-refined skills to work in the labor force."
