= Loose Change (disambiguation) =

Loose Change is a series of films about the September 11, 2001, attacks.

Loose change may refer to:

== Music ==
- Loose Change (EP), an extended play of Ed Sheeran
- Loose Change, a 2006 album by The Gaskets
- "Loose Change", a 1998 song by Bruce Springsteen from Tracks
- "Loose Change", a 2003 song by Ja Rule
- "Loose Change", a 2014 song by Royal Blood from their self-titled album
- "Loose Change", a 2022 song by Brent Faiyaz from the album Wasteland

== Other uses ==
- Loose Change (book), a 1977 non-fiction book by Sara Davidson
- TSA Loose Change Act (2013 USA 113 H.R. 1095), a failed bill concerning money left at TSA checkpoints
- "Mr. Monopoly's Loose Change" / "Uncle Pennybags's Loose Change", a playing square in Monopoly Junior

== See also ==
- Loose (disambiguation)
- Change (disambiguation)
