= United States House Select Bipartisan Committee to Investigate the Preparation for and Response to Hurricane Katrina =

The Select Bipartisan Committee to Investigate the Preparation for and Response to Hurricane Katrina was the House of Representatives' congressional committee investigating the United States Government's failure to respond appropriately to Hurricane Katrina.

The committee was directed to cease 30 days after releasing its final report. That report was released February 15, 2006.

== Members ==
Despite the committee's name, it actually did not operate on a bipartisan basis. The committee was to have 20 members, with 11 members from the Republican majority and nine members from the Democratic minority. However, Democrats did not appoint any members to the committee.

Majority	Minority
Tom Davis, Chairman, Virginia; Hal Rogers, Kentucky; Chris Shays, Connecticut; Henry Bonilla, Texas; Steve Buyer, Indiana; Sue Myrick, North Carolina; Mac Thornberry, Texas; Kay Granger, Texas; Chip Pickering, Mississippi; Bill Shuster, Pennsylvania; Jeff Miller, Florida	Not appointed

== Final report ==
The final report, titled A Failure of Intitiave, found issues in the governmental response at all levels. It led to enactment of "Post-Katrina Emergency Reform Act", which was meant to rectify the mistakes made and lack of preparation in response to Katrina.

== See also ==
- Criticism of the government response to Hurricane Katrina
