= 1882 United States House of Representatives elections in Florida =

United States House of Representatives elections in Florida, 1882
- November 7, 1882

Both of Florida's seats to the United States House of Representatives
	First party	Second party
Party	Democratic	Republican
Last election	2	0
Seats won	1	1
Seat change	▼1	▲1
Popular vote	24,059	23,645
Percentage	50.4%	49.6%

The 1882 United States House of Representatives elections in Florida were held November 7 for the 48th Congress

== Background ==
In the previous election, two Democrats had been elected to represent Florida. In the 2nd district, Republican Horatio Bisbee, Jr. successfully contested the election of Jesse J. Finley (D) and was seated June 1, 1882, so that going in the 1882 elections, Florida was represented by 1 Republican and 1 Democrat.

The 2nd district had been a contentious district in previous elections, with the past 4 elections being contested successfully.

== Election results ==
Both incumbents ran successfully for re-election. In the 2nd district, both contestants had served for part of the 47th Congress.

1882 United States House election results
District	Democratic			Republican			Independent Republican		
1st	Robert H. M. Davidson (I)	11,246	51.5%	Emory F. Skinner	7,029	32.2%	Daniel L. McKinnon	3,547	16.3%
2nd	Jesse J. Finley	12,813	49.5%	Horatio Bisbee, Jr. (I)	13,069	50.5%			

This was the last Congressional election in Florida won by a Republican until 1954

== 1st District ==
United States House of Representatives election in Florida 1st congressional district, 1882
- November 7, 1882
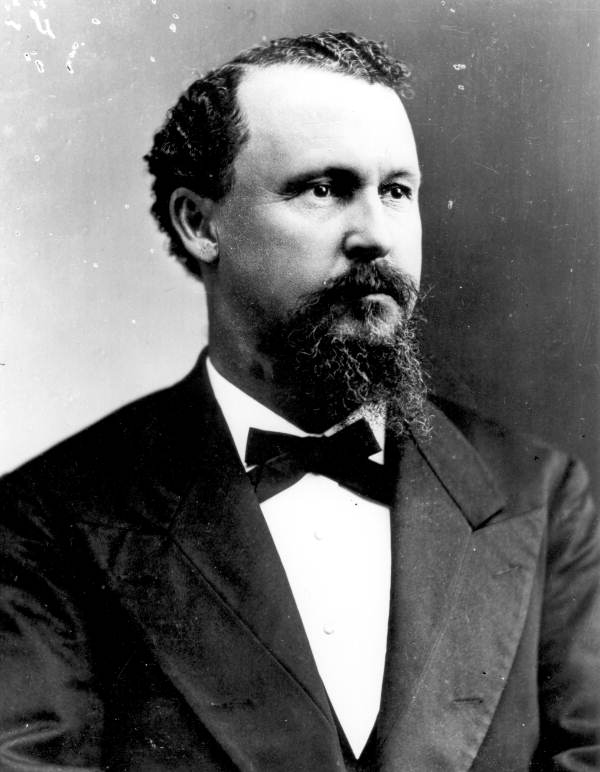

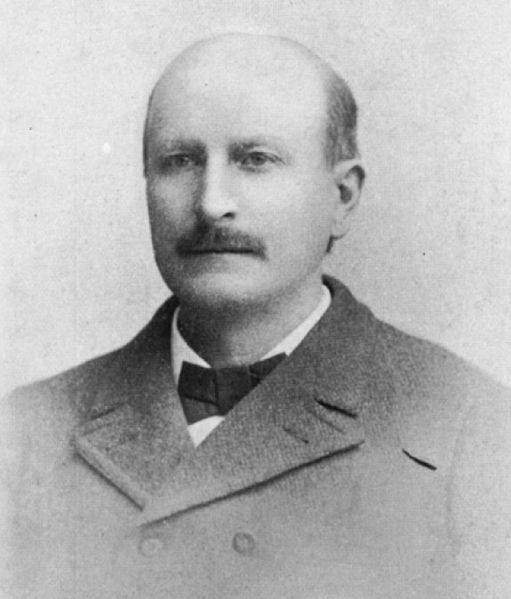

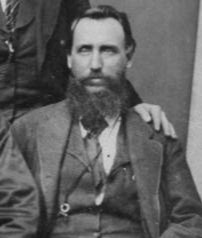
Nominee	Robert H. M. Davidson	Emory F. Skinner
Party	Democratic	Republican
Popular vote	11,246	7,029
Percentage	51.54%	32.21%
Nominee	Daniel L. McKinnon
Party	Independent Republican
Popular vote	3,547
Percentage	16.25%
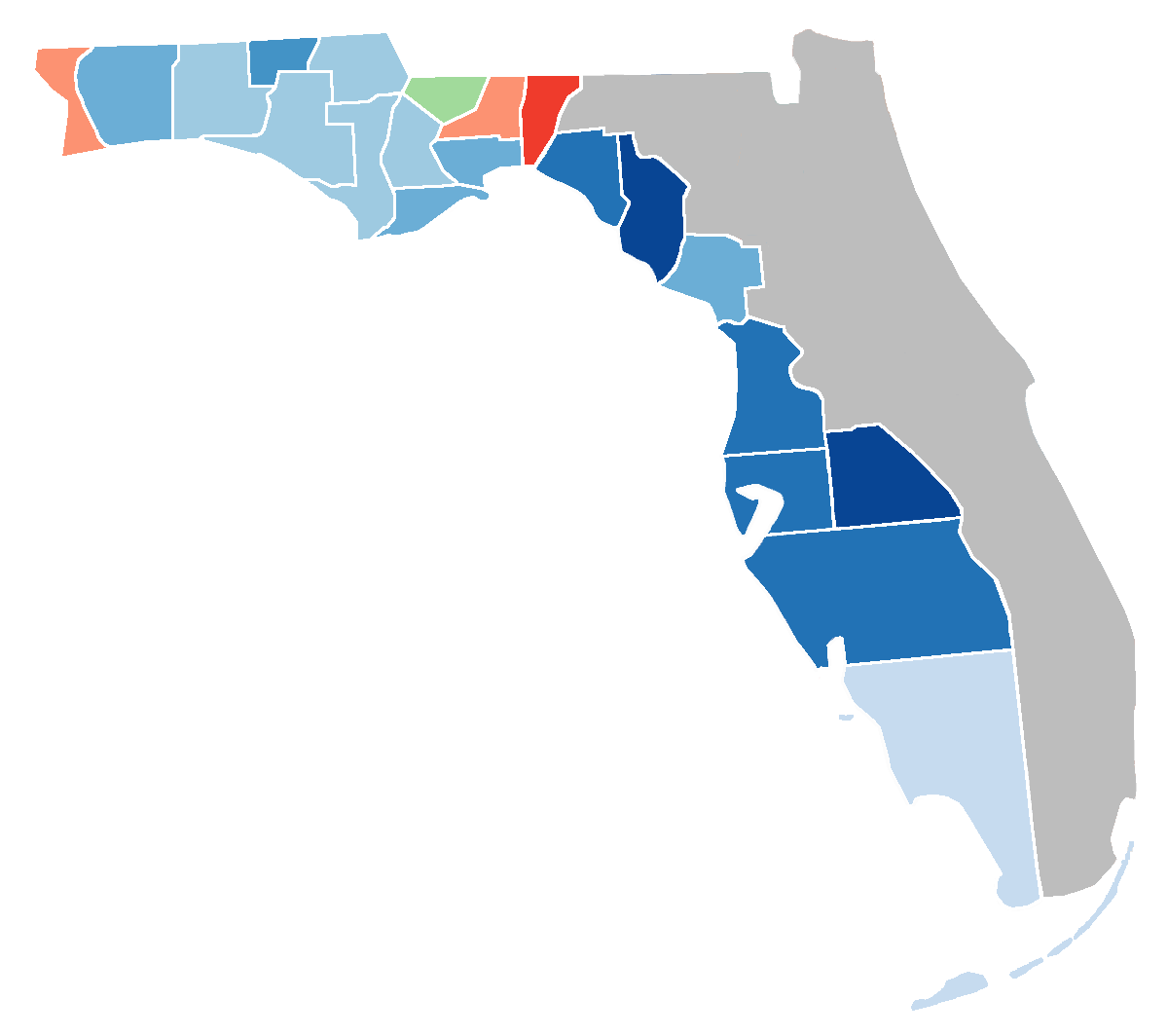
County Results
Davidson
40–49%
50–59%
60–69%
70–79%
80–89%
90–100%
Skinner
50–59%
70–79%
McKinnon
50–59%

1882 United States House election 1st District results
Democratic			Republican			Independent Republican		
Robert H. M. Davidson (I)	11,246	51.54%	Emory F. Skinner	7,029	32.21%	Daniel L. McKinnon	3,547	16.25%

=== Results ===
County	Robert H. M. Davidson Democratic		Emory F. Skinner Republican		Daniel L. McKinnon Independent Republican		Total votes
County	#	%	#	%	#	%	Total votes
Calhoun	132	50.97%	0	0.00%	127	49.03%	259
Escambia	865	37.92%	1,233	54.06%	183	8.02%	2,281
Franklin	287	66.13%	114	26.27%	33	7.60%	434
Gadsden	752	42.15%	7	0.39%	1,025	57.46%	1,784
Hernando	751	84.76%	135	15.24%	0	0.00%	886
Hillsborough	840	81.47%	189	18.33%	2	0.19%	1,031
Holmes	240	70.38%	0	0.00%	101	29.62%	341
Jackson	1,368	58.61%	604	25.88%	362	15.51%	2,334
Jefferson	573	25.94%	1,620	73.34%	16	0.72%	2,209
Lafayette	370	94.15%	23	5.85%	0	0.00%	393
Leon	630	23.24%	1,511	55.74%	570	21.03%	2,711
Levy	669	61.83%	260	24.03%	153	14.14%	1,082
Liberty	140	55.34%	0	0.00%	113	44.66%	253
Manatee	501	82.81%	103	17.02%	1	0.17%	605
Monroe	968	48.64%	548	27.54%	474	23.82%	1,990
Polk	481	100.00%	0	0.00%	0	0.00%	481
Santa Rosa	568	62.21%	329	36.04%	16	1.75%	913
Taylor	186	62.25%	38	16.74%	3	1.32%	227
Wakulla	249	62.25%	151	37.75%	0	0.00%	400
Walton	415	59.71%	63	9.06%	217	31.22%	695
Washington	261	50.88%	101	19.69%	151	29.43%	513
Totals	11,246	51.54%	7,029	32.21%	3,547	16.25%	21,822

== 2nd District ==
United States House of Representatives election in Florida 2nd congressional district, 1882
- November 7, 1882
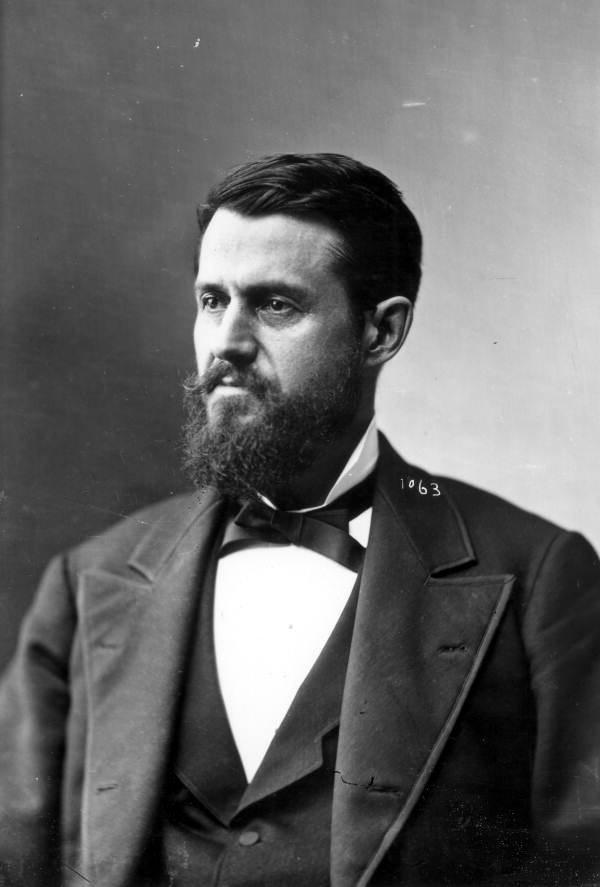

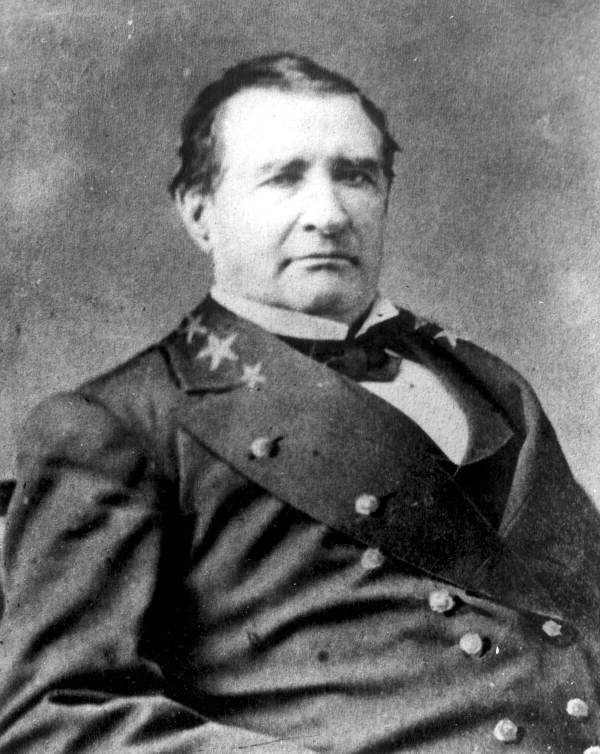
Nominee	Horatio Bisbee, Jr.	Jesse J. Finley
Party	Republican	Democratic
Popular vote	13,069	12,813
Percentage	50.49%	49.51%
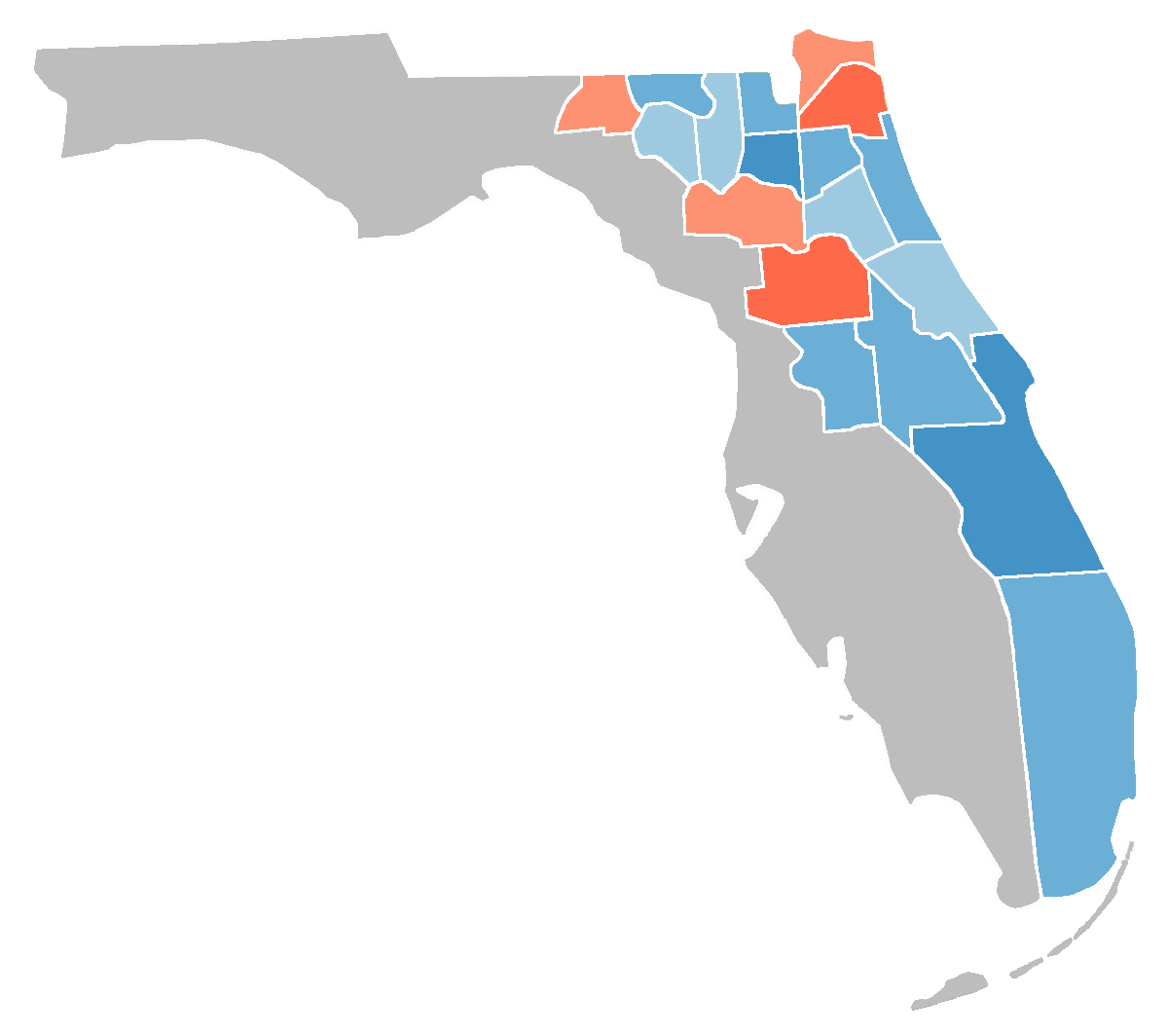
County Results
Finley
50–59%
60–69%
70–79%
Bisbee
50–59%
60–69%

1882 United States House election 2nd District results
Democratic			Republican		
Jesse J. Finley	12,813	49.51%	Horatio Bisbee, Jr.	13,069	50.49%

=== Results ===
County	Jesse J. Finley Democratic		Horatio Bisbee, Jr. Republican		Total votes
County	#	%	#	%	Total votes
Alachua	1,332	41.05%	1,913	58.95%	3,245
Baker	240	64.17%	134	35.83%	374
Bradford	824	75.80%	263	24.20%	1,087
Brevard	219	75.78%	70	24.22%	289
Clay	345	63.30%	200	36.70%	545
Columbia	931	53.48%	810	46.52%	1,741
Dade	44	67.69%	21	32.31%	65
Duval	1,244	34.77%	2,334	65.23%	3,578
Hamilton	648	60.96%	415	39.04%	1,063
Madison	998	40.37%	1,474	59.63%	2,472
Marion	973	36.76%	1,674	63.24%	2,647
Nassau	621	43.58%	804	56.42%	1,425
Orange	1,111	69.83%	480	30.17%	1,557
Putnam	784	50.35%	773	49.65%	1,557
St. Johns	526	62.25%	319	37.75%	845
Sumter	713	69.56%	312	30.44%	1,025
Suwannee	782	53.89%	669	46.11%	1,451
Volusia	484	54.50%	404	45.50%	888
Actual Totals	12,819	49.52%	13,069	50.48%	25,888
Official Total	12,813	49.51%	13,069	50.49%	25,882

== See also ==
- United States House of Representatives elections, 1882
