= Department of Veterans Affairs Management Accountability Act of 2014 =

- Long title: To amend title 38, United States Code, to provide for the removal of Senior Executive Service employees of the Department of Veterans Affairs for performance, and for other purposes.
- Announced in: the 113th United States Congress
- Sponsored by: Rep. Jeff Miller (R, FL-1)
- Number of co-sponsors: 9

Codification
- U.S.C. sections affected: 38 U.S.C. § 713, 38 U.S.C. ch. 7
- Agencies affected: United States Department of Veterans Affairs

Legislative history
- Introduced in the House as H.R. 4031 by Rep. Jeff Miller (R, FL-1) on February 11, 2014; Committee consideration by United States House Committee on Veterans' Affairs, United States House Committee on Oversight and Government Reform; Passed the House on May 21, 2014 (Rollc Call Vote 229: 390-33)

The Department of Veterans Affairs Management Accountability Act of 2014 (H.R. 4031) is a bill that would give the United States Secretary of Veterans Affairs the authority to remove or demote any individual from the Senior Executive Service upon determining that such individual's performance warrants removal or demotion. The bill was written in response to a scandal indicating that some VA hospitals were keeping secret waiting lists for care, the length of which may have led to the deaths of some veterans.

The bill was introduced into the United States House of Representatives during the 113th United States Congress. It passed the House on May 21, 2014.

== Background ==
In May 2014, questions involving substandard timely care and false records covering up related timelines came to light, involving treatment of veterans in a number of VA hospitals. Eric Shinseki, then Secretary of Veterans Affairs, resigned on May 30, 2014. Senior Veterans Affairs officials reportedly kept secret waiting lists in order to hide the high number of veterans that were forced to wait for months to receive important medical care. As many as 450 senior officials may have been involved, including VA hospital managers. Some veterans died while they were still awaiting treatment.

A VA department handbook on administrative policies indicates that employees have 30 days to appeal any disciplinary action before it can be taken and have all disciplinary actions or reprimands removed from their records after two years. The department has to meet high standards for doing things like separately proving an employee was absent each and every day if the employee quits showing up to work and proving that there is a direct relationship between the misconduct and their own efficiency.

Data provided by the Office of Personnel Management shows that only 7,349 federal employees were fired in 2013 out of a total of almost 2 million.

== Provisions of the bill ==
This summary is based largely on the summary provided by the Congressional Research Service, a public domain source.

The Department of Veterans Affairs Management Accountability Act of 2014 would authorize the United States Secretary of Veterans Affairs (VA) to: (1) remove any individual from the Senior Executive Service upon determining that such individual's performance warrants removal, and (2) remove such individual from federal service or transfer the individual to a General Schedule position at any grade that the Secretary deems appropriate.

The bill would require: (1) the Secretary to notify the United States House Committee on Veterans' Affairs and the United States Senate Committee on Veterans' Affairs within 30 days after removing such an individual, and (2) such removal to be done in the same manner as the removal of a professional staff member employed by a Member of Congress.

== Procedural history ==
The Department of Veterans Affairs Management Accountability Act of 2014 was introduced into the United States House of Representatives on February 11, 2014, by Rep. Jeff Miller (R, FL-1). The bill was referred to the United States House Committee on Veterans' Affairs, the United States House Veterans' Affairs Subcommittee on Economic Opportunity, and the United States House Committee on Oversight and Government Reform. The House voted in Roll Call Vote 229 on May 21, 2014, to pass the bill 390–33.

== Debate and discussion ==
The Department of Veterans' Affairs released a statement opposing the bill, arguing that the bill "would generate serious unintended consequences that would prove counterproductive." One alleged unintended consequence might be "any change that would single out VA employees for punishment or discharge could have a chilling effect on VA's ability to recruit and retain high-quality employees." Their statement also indicated that they feared anyone fired could sue, leading to "lengthy litigation."

The House members who sponsored the bill argue that, although federal workers can be fired, the process is extremely lengthy, sometimes taking years, and that the officials who are "under scrutiny for neglecting veterans actually received tens of thousands of dollars in bonuses and positive performance reviews." Rep. Jeff Miller, who sponsored the bill, said that "this bill would simply give the VA Secretary the authority to fire or demote VA Senior Executive Service employees based on performance, similar to the authority the Secretary of Defense already has to remove military general officers from command or how I am able to fire someone who works for me on my staff."

The organization AMVETS supported the legislation. National Commander John H. Miller Jr. said that "under the current, antiquated and morbidly dysfunctional civil service system, it's nearly impossible to dismiss or do more than slap the wrists of incompetent, ineffective and wasteful Senior Executive Service employees." John Miller argued that the Secretary of Veterans Affairs needed "the ability to remove deadweight executives."

== See also ==
- List of bills in the 113th United States Congress
