= TSA Loose Change Act =

- Long title: To amend title 49, United States Code, to direct the Assistant Secretary of Homeland Security (Transportation Security Administration) to transfer unclaimed money recovered at airport security checkpoints to nonprofit organizations that provide places of rest and recuperation at airports for members of the Armed Forces and their families, and for other purposes.
- Announced in: the 113th United States Congress
- Sponsored by: Rep. Jeff Miller (R, FL-1)
- Number of co-sponsors: 1

Codification
- Acts affected: Department of Homeland Security Appropriations Act, 2005
- U.S.C. sections affected: 49 U.S.C. § 44945
- Agencies affected: Transportation Security Administration

Legislative history
- Introduced in the House as H.R. 1095 by Rep. Jeff Miller (R, FL-1) on March 12, 2013; Committee consideration by United States House Committee on Homeland Security, United States House Homeland Security Subcommittee on Transportation Security; Passed the House on December 3, 2013 (voice vote)

The TSA Loose Change Act (H.R. 1095) was a bill intended to require the Transportation Security Administration to give the money left behind by passengers at TSA checkpoints to private charities that provide travel-related services to the members of the U.S. military and their families. The bill passed the United States House of Representatives during the 113th United States Congress, but it died in committee in the Senate.

== Background ==
The TSA collected over $531,000 at airport checkpoints in 2012, an increase from $487,000 in 2011. John F. Kennedy International Airport in New York was the airport to keep the most loose change in 2010, collecting $46,918.06. The money is currently retained by the TSA for civil aviation security.

The act would have directed the Assistant Secretary of Homeland Security (Transportation Security Administration) to transfer annually, without further appropriation, unclaimed money recovered at airport security checkpoints to nonprofit organizations that operate multiple airport centers throughout the United States to provide a place of rest and recuperation for Armed Forces members and their families. No specific charity was identified by name, but only the United Service Organizations met the requirements.

== Congressional Budget Office report ==
This summary is based largely on the summary provided by the Congressional Budget Office, as ordered reported by the House Committee on Homeland Security on October 29, 2013. This is a public domain source.

Under current law, the Transportation Security Administration (TSA) has authority to retain and spend, without annual appropriation, unclaimed money left at security checkpoints by air passengers for activities related to aviation security. According to TSA, airline passengers have left behind about $500,000 at airport security checkpoints in each of the past two fiscal years. Based on historical spending patterns, CBO expects that TSA will spend unclaimed checkpoint money gradually over the next several years.

H.R. 1095 would have amended current law to require TSA to transfer unclaimed funds to nonprofit organizations that provide certain travel-related assistance to military personnel and their families. Requiring the agency to transfer such amounts to a nonfederal entity would accelerate the pace of spending relative to current law. However, because of the modest amount of money involved, CBO did not expect this change to have a significant net impact on the budget in any given year. For purposes of its estimates, CBO assumed that the requirement to transfer funds would apply only to amounts collected after the bill's enactment and that existing balances would remain available to TSA for aviation security.

H.R. 1095 contained no intergovernmental or private-sector mandates as defined in the Unfunded Mandates Reform Act.

== Procedural history ==
The TSA Loose Change Act was introduced on March 12, 2013 by Rep. Jeff Miller (R, FL-1). It was referred to the United States House Committee on Homeland Security and the United States House Homeland Security Subcommittee on Transportation Security. It was reported alongside House Report 113-274. On November 27, 2013, House Majority Leader Eric Cantor announced the H.R. 1095 would be considered on the House floor on December 3, 2013. The House voted on December 3, 2013 to pass the bill by a voice vote. Upon reaching the Senate on the same day, it was referred to the Commerce Committee, but no action was ever taken on it.

== Debate and discussion ==
In the debate prior to passage in the House, the bill received the support of both Republicans and Democrats.

Jeff Miller, the bill's sponsor, said that "the TSA has been keeping the pennies, nickels, dimes, and quarters from your change purse to pay for their bloated bureaucracy" and raised the question of "If TSA representatives get to play 'finders keepers' with your hard-earned cash, what's the incentive to try to get the loose change to its rightful owners?"

== See also ==
- List of bills in the 113th United States Congress
- Transportation Security Administration
- United Service Organizations
