= Jeff Miller (Florida politician) =

American politician (born 1959)

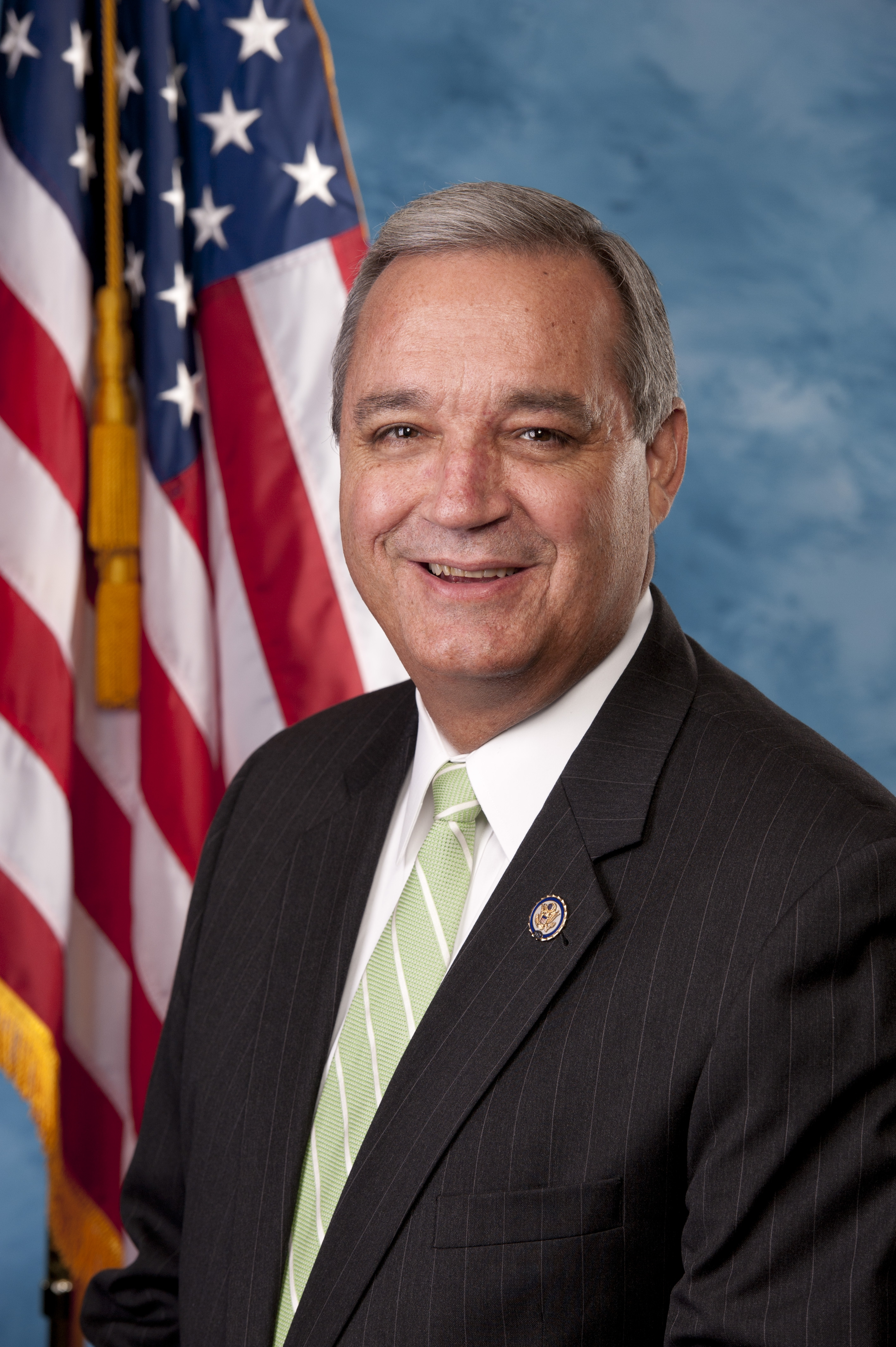
- Official portrait, 2011

Chair of the House Veterans' Affairs Committee
- In office January 3, 2011 – January 3, 2017
- Preceded by: Bob Filner
- Succeeded by: Phil Roe

Member of the U.S. House of Representatives from Florida's 1st district
- In office October 16, 2001 – January 3, 2017 (Note: Miller's official service begins on the date of the special election, while he was not sworn in until October 23, 2001.)
- Preceded by: Joe Scarborough
- Succeeded by: Matt Gaetz

Member of the Florida House of Representatives from the 1st district
- In office November 3, 1998 – October 16, 2001
- Preceded by: Jerry Burroughs
- Succeeded by: Greg Evers

Personal details
- Born: Jefferson Bingham Miller; June 27, 1959 (age 67) St. Petersburg, Florida, U.S.
- Party: Democratic (before 1997); Republican (1997–present)
- Spouse: Vicki Miller
- Education: University of Florida (BA)

Jefferson Bingham Miller (born June 27, 1959) is an American politician who served as the U.S. representative for Florida's 1st congressional district from 2001 to 2017. A member of the Republican Party, his district included all of Escambia County, Santa Rosa County, Okaloosa County, Walton County, Holmes County and Washington County.

== Early life and education ==
Miller was born in St. Petersburg, Florida. After graduating from Bronson High School in 1977, he served for one year under the National FFA Organization as Florida state secretary. Miller went on to receive a Bachelor of Arts in journalism from the University of Florida in 1984. He was a real estate broker and a deputy sheriff before taking public office.

== Career ==
=== Florida House of Representatives ===
Miller was an executive assistant to Democratic state Agriculture Commissioner Doyle Conner from 1984 to 1988. He was a Democrat until he switched parties in 1997.

Miller was a member of the Florida House of Representatives from November 3, 1998, to October 16, 2001. During his three years there, he was a member of the committees on Utilities & Telecommunications, Congressional Redistricting, Council for Ready Infrastructure, and Rules, Ethics & Elections. During his second term in the state house, Miller was chairman of the Utilities of Telecommunications Committee. He also oversaw a board in charge of community development in Escambia County.

=== U.S. House of Representatives ===
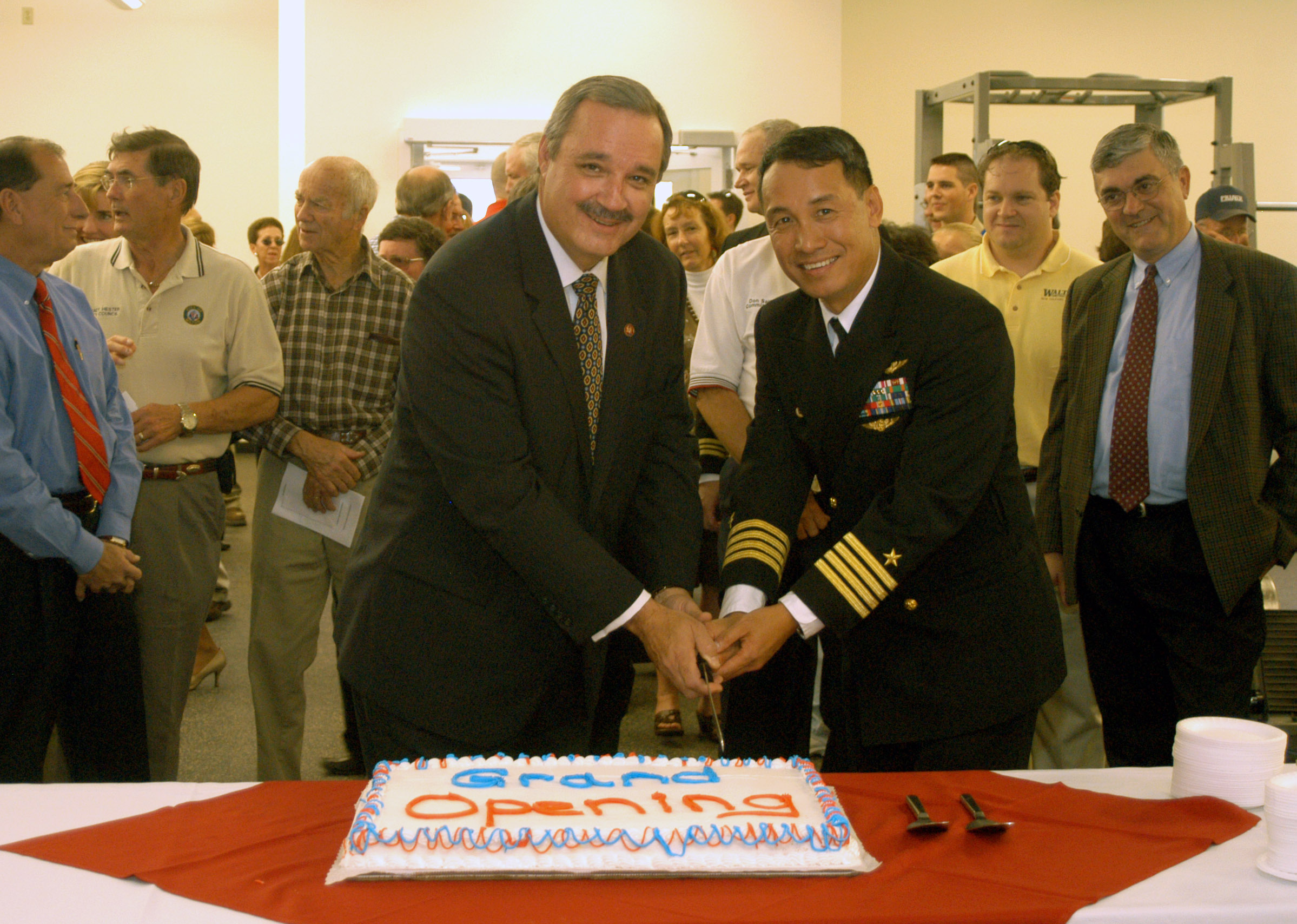
Congressman Jeff Miller and Captain Enrique Sadsad cut a cake at Naval Air Station Whiting Field

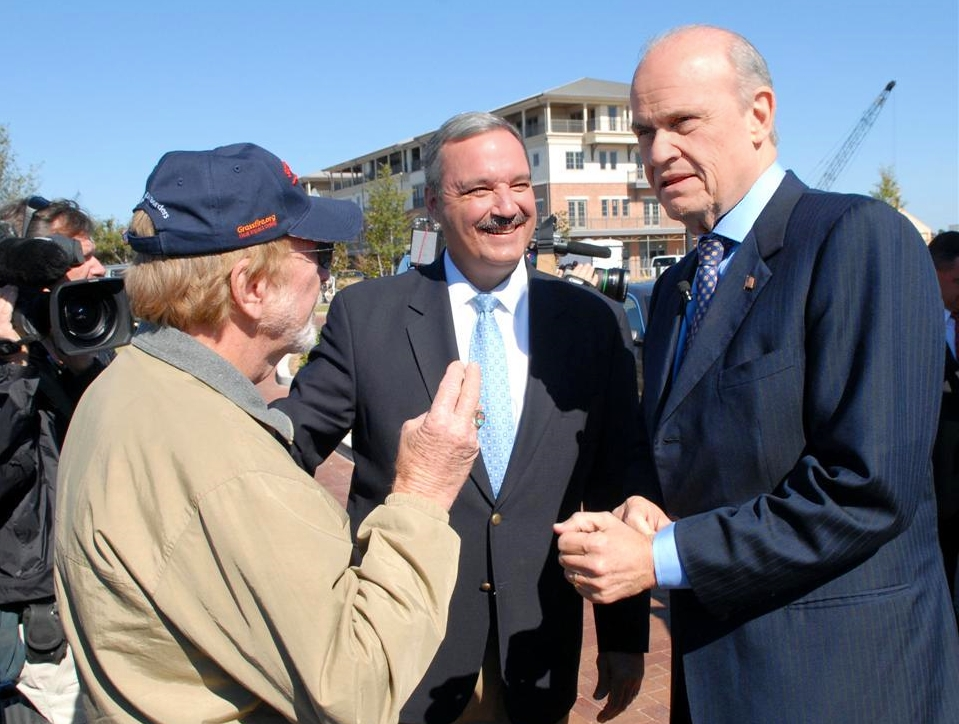
Congressman Jeff Miller introduces former Senator and Republican party presidential candidate Fred Thompson at a Florida rally in 2007

After Republican incumbent Joe Scarborough resigned five months into his fourth term, Miller won a crowded six-way special Republican primary with 54 percent of the vote. By this time, the 1st had become the most Republican district in Florida, and one of the most Republican districts in the South. Thus, for all intents and purposes, Miller assured himself of becoming the district's next congressman with his primary victory. He won the special election with 66 percent of the vote. He won a full term in 2002 with 75 percent of the vote, and was reelected six more times with only nominal opposition, never dropping below 69 percent of the vote. He didn't face a major-party challenger in 2006 or 2010.

Miller announced on March 10, 2016, that he would not seek reelection during the 2016 elections.

==== Committee assignments ====
- Committee on Armed Services
  - Subcommittee on Emerging Threats and Capabilities
- Committee on Veterans' Affairs (Chair)
- Permanent Select Committee on Intelligence

==== Caucus memberships ====
- International Conservation Caucus
- Israel Allies Caucus
- Liberty Caucus
- Sportsmen's Caucus
- Congressional Constitution Caucus
- Friends of Wales Caucus

During the 107th Congress, he served on the House Armed Services Committee (Subcommittee on Total Force and the Subcommittee on Military Research and Development) and the Committee on Veterans’ Affairs.

During the 108th Congress, he served on the House Armed Services Committee (Subcommittee on Readiness and the Subcommittee on Terrorism, Unconventional Threats and Capabilities) and the Committee on Veterans’ Affairs.

During the 109th Congress, he served on the House Armed Services Committee (Subcommittee on Readiness the Subcommittee on Terrorism, Unconventional Threats and Capabilities, and the Subcommittee on Projection Forces), the Committee on Veterans’ Affairs, and the United States Select Bipartisan Committee on Hurricane Katrina Preparation/Response Investigation.

== Legislation sponsored ==
This is a partial list of legislation sponsored by Miller.

- To establish a commission or task force to evaluate the backlog of disability claims of the Department of Veterans Affairs – a bill that would create a task force to address the issue of a large backlog of veterans disability claims.
- TSA Loose Change Act (H.R. 1095; 113th Congress) – a bill that would force the Transportation Security Administration to give the money left behind by passengers at TSA checkpoints to private charities that provide travel-related services to the members of the U.S. military and their families. Miller introduced the bill on March 12, 2013.
- GI Bill Tuition Fairness Act of 2013 (H.R. 357; 113th Congress) – a bill that would require states to offer veterans the in-state tuition price instead of the out-of-state tuition price regardless of whether the veteran met the residency requirement. The bill would also make other changes to veterans' benefits. The bill passed the House of Representatives on February 3, 2014.
- Department of Veterans Affairs Management Accountability Act of 2014 (H.R. 4031; 113th Congress) – a bill that would give the United States Secretary of Veterans Affairs the authority to remove or demote any individual from the Senior Executive Service upon determining that such individual's performance warrants removal or demotion. The bill was written in response to a scandal indicating that some VA hospitals were keeping secret waiting lists for care, the length of which may have led to the deaths of some veterans.
- Veteran Access to Care Act of 2014 (H.R. 4810; 113th Congress) – a bill that would allow United States veterans to receive their healthcare from non-VA facilities under certain conditions. The bill is a response to the Veterans Health Administration scandal of 2014, in which it was discovered that there was systematic lying about the wait times veterans experienced waiting to be seen by doctors. By June 5, 2014, Veterans Affairs internal investigations had identified a total of 35 veterans who had died while waiting for care in the Phoenix VHA system. Miller said that the wait times veterans were forced to face was "a national disgrace."

== Personal life ==
Miller lives in the small town of Chumuckla, Florida (Native American word for "Healing Waters"), which is located about 20 miles northeast of Pensacola, Florida. He and his wife Vicki have two children and four grandchildren and were members of Olive Baptist Church.

== Electoral history ==
=== 2001 ===
Florida's 1st congressional district special election, 2001
Party	Candidate	Votes	%
Republican	Jeff Miller	53,547	65.68
Democratic	Steve Briese	22,695	27.99
Independent	John G. Ralls, Jr.	5,115	6.31
	Write-in	14	0.02
Total votes		81,071	100.0
Republican hold			

=== 2002 ===
Florida's 1st congressional district election, 2002
Party	Candidate	Votes	%
Republican	Jeff Miller	41,990	64.4
Republican	Mike Francisco	23,164	35.6
Total votes		65,154	100.0

Florida's 1st congressional district election, 2002
Party	Candidate	Votes	%
Republican	Jeff Miller	152,635	74.6
Democratic	Steve Briese	51,972	25.4
Independent	Tom Wells	19	0.0
Total votes		204,626	100.0
Republican hold			

=== 2004 ===
Florida's 1st congressional district election, 2004
Party	Candidate	Votes	%
Republican	Jeff Miller (incumbent)	236,604	76.5
Democratic	Mark S. Coutu	72,506	23.5
Total votes		309,110	100.0
Republican hold			

=== 2006 ===
Florida's 1st congressional district election, 2006
Party	Candidate	Votes	%
Republican	Jeff Miller (incumbent)	135,786	68.54
Democratic	Joe Roberts	62,340	31.46
Total votes		198,126	100.0
Republican hold			

=== 2008 ===
Florida's 1st congressional district election, 2008
Party	Candidate	Votes	%
Republican	Jeff Miller (incumbent)	232,559	70.2
Democratic	Jim Bryan	98,797	29.8
Total votes		331,356	100.0
Republican hold			

=== 2010 ===
Florida's 1st congressional district election, 2010
Party	Candidate	Votes	%
Republican	Jeff Miller (incumbent)	168,899	81
Independent	Joe Cantrell	22,763	11
Independent	John Krause	17,869	9
Total votes		209,531	100

=== 2012 ===
Florida's 1st congressional district, 2012
Party	Candidate	Votes	%
Republican	Jeff Miller (incumbent)	238,440	69.6
Democratic	Jim Bryan	92,961	27.1
Libertarian	Calen Fretts	11,176	3.3
Independent	William Cleave (write-in)	17	0.0
Total votes		342,594	100.0
Republican hold			

=== 2014 ===
Republican primary results
Party	Candidate	Votes	%
Republican	Jeff Miller (incumbent)	44,784	75.3
Republican	John E Krause	14,660	24.7
Total votes		59,444	100.0

Florida's 1st congressional district, 2014
Party	Candidate	Votes	%
Republican	Jeff Miller (incumbent)	165,086	70.1
Democratic	Jim Bryan	54,976	23.4
Independent	Mark Wichern	15,281	6.5
Total votes		235,343	100.0
Republican hold			

U.S. House of Representatives
Preceded by Joe Scarborough	Member of the U.S. House of Representatives from Florida's 1st congressional district 2001–2017	Succeeded by Matt Gaetz
Preceded by Bob Filner	Chair of the House Veterans' Affairs Committee; 2011–2017	Succeeded by Phil Roe
U.S. order of precedence (ceremonial)
Preceded by Ander Crenshaw as Former U.S. Representative	Order of precedence of the United States as Former U.S. Representative	Succeeded by Jack Fields as Former U.S. Representative
