= 2001 Florida's 1st congressional district special election =

- October 16, 2001

Florida's 1st congressional district
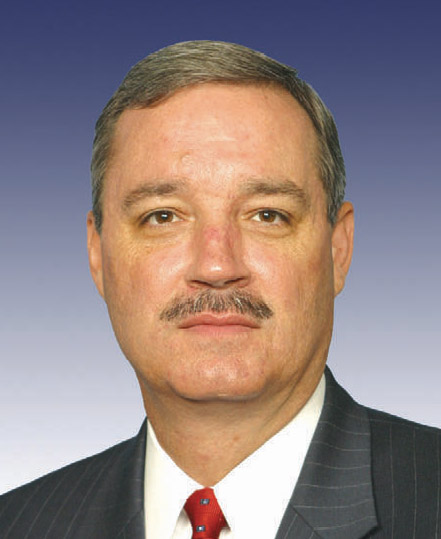

| Nominee | Jeff Miller | Steve Briese | John G. Ralls, Jr |
| Party | Republican | Democratic | Independent |
| Popular vote | 53,247 | 22,695 | 5,115 |
| Percentage | 65.68% | 27.99% | 6.31% |
U.S. Representative before election
Joe Scarborough
Republican
Elected U.S. Representative
Jeff Miller
Republican

The 2001 special election for Florida's 1st congressional district took place on October 16, 2001, to fill the vacancy caused by Representative Joe Scarborough's resignation. Florida's 1st congressional district was a staunchly conservative district stretching from Panama City Beach to Pensacola in the Florida Panhandle.

State Representative Jeff Miller, the Republican nominee, easily defeated Steve Briese, a financial writer and the Democratic nominee.

== Democratic primary ==
=== Candidates ===
- Steve Briese, financial writer, Army veteran
- Chuck Lynch

=== Results ===
Democratic primary results,
| Party | Candidate | Votes | % |
|---|---|---|---|
| Democratic | Steve Briese | 12,135 | 76.80% |
| Democratic | Chuck Lynch | 3,666 | 23.20% |
| Total votes | | 15,801 | 100.00% |

== Republican primary ==
=== Candidates ===
- Jeff Miller, Florida State Representative
- Michael C. Francisco, retired Air Force Colonel
- Randy Knepper, former congressional aide to Representative Earl Hutto
- Bob Condon, attorney, 2000 Republican candidate for Congress
- Robert "Bob" Pappas, retired Marines Colonel
- Ken Revell

=== Results ===
Republican primary results
| Party | Candidate | Votes | % |
|---|---|---|---|
| Republican | Jeff Miller | 24,217 | 54.13% |
| Republican | Michael C. Francisco | 7,078 | 15.82% |
| Republican | Randy Knepper | 6,536 | 14.61% |
| Republican | Bob Condon | 3,818 | 8.53% |
| Republican | Robert "Bob" Pappas | 2,805 | 6.27% |
| Republican | Ken Revell | 288 | 0.64% |
| Total votes | | 44,742 | 100.00% |

== General election ==
=== Campaign ===
Political commentators widely expected that Miller, who had previously represented parts of the 1st District in the state legislature, would easily triumph over Briese and John G. Ralls Jr., a podiatrist running as an independent candidate, given the district's strong conservative lean. Nevertheless, to promote his campaign, Briese walked 100 miles across the district. He campaigned on his service in the military, which he argued was particularly important in the aftermath of the September 11 terrorist attacks, which occurred a little more than a month before the election. Given the location of seven military installations in the district, including Pensacola Naval Air Station and Eglin Air Force Base, Briese emphasized both his experience in the military and his time working as a contractor on repair projects for some of the bases. Miller, meanwhile, emphasized his support for then-President George W. Bush, saying, "Our president needs a partner in the 1st Congressional District. I am ready to be that partner." However, all three candidates announced their support for then-President George W. Bush's leadership in the war on terror.

Ultimately, owing to the conservative nature of the district, Miller defeated Briese and Ralls in a landslide, and won his first term in Congress.

=== Results ===
Florida's 1st congressional district special election, 2001
| Party | Candidate | Votes | % |
|---|---|---|---|
| Republican | Jeff Miller | 53,547 | 65.68 |
| Democratic | Steve Briese | 22,695 | 27.99 |
| Independent | John G. Ralls, Jr. | 5,115 | 6.31 |
| | Write-in | 14 | 0.02 |
| Total votes | | 81,071 | 100.00 |
| Republican hold | | | |

==== By County ====
| County | Jeff Miller Republican | | Steve Briese Democratic | | John Ralls Independent | | All others | | Margin | | Total votes cast |
| County | # | % | # | % | # | % | # | % | # | % | Total votes cast |
|---|---|---|---|---|---|---|---|---|---|---|---|
| Bay (part) | 1,483 | 71.2% | 557 | 26.7% | 39 | 1.9% | 4 | 0.2% | 926 | 44.5% | 2,083 |
| Escambia | 18,851 | 62.3% | 9,616 | 31.8% | 1,769 | 5.8% | 6 | 0.1% | 9,235 | 30.5% | 30,242 |
| Holmes | 633 | 54.6% | 506 | 43.7% | 20 | 1.7% | 0 | 0.0% | 127 | 10.9% | 1,159 |
| Okaloosa | 18,239 | 65.4% | 7,341 | 26.3% | 2,316 | 8.3% | 0 | 0.0% | 10,898 | 39.1% | 27,896 |
| Santa Rosa | 11,601 | 75.7% | 3,012 | 19.7% | 703 | 4.6% | 4 | 0.1% | 8,569 | 56.0% | 15,320 |
| Walton | 2,440 | 55.8% | 1,663 | 38.0% | 268 | 6.1% | 0 | 0.0% | 777 | 17.8% | 4,371 |
| Totals | 53,247 | 65.68% | 22,695 | 27.99% | 5,115 | 6.31% | 14 | 0.02% | 30,552 | 37.69% | 81,071 |
