= Unfunded Mandates Reform Act of 1995 =

- Long title: An Act to curb the practice of imposing unfunded Federal mandates on States and local governments; to strengthen the partnership between the Federal Government and State, local and tribal governments; to end the imposition, in the absence of full consideration by Congress, of Federal mandates on State, local, and tribal governments without adequate funding, in a manner that may displace other essential governmental priorities; and to ensure that the Federal Government pays the costs incurred by those governments in complying with certain requirements under Federal statutes and regulations, and for other purposes.
- Enacted by: the 104th United States Congress
- Effective: January 1, 1996

Citations
- Public law: Pub. L. 104–4 (text) (PDF)
- Statutes at Large: 109 Stat. 48

Legislative history
- Introduced in the Senate by Dirk Kempthorne (R‑ID) on January 4, 1995; Committee consideration by United States Senate Committee on the Budget; United States Senate Committee on Homeland Security and Governmental Affairs; Passed the Senate on January 27, 1995 (86-10); Passed the House on February 1, 1995 (without objection); Reported by the joint conference committee on March 1, 1995; agreed to by the Senate on March 15, 1995 (91-9) and by the House on March 16, 1995 (394-28); Signed into law by President Bill Clinton on March 22, 1995

The Unfunded Mandates Reform Act of 1995 (UMRA) restricts the federal imposition of unfunded mandates on state, local and tribal governments in the United States.

== History ==
UMRA was introduced on January 4, 1995, in the Senate by Dirk Kempthorne of Idaho as S. 1 to the Committees on the Budget and Governmental Affairs. It passed the full Senate on the 27th by a vote of 86 to 10; an identical version passed the House on February 1. It was signed into law by president Bill Clinton on March 22.

== Provisions ==
The four titles of the Unfunded Mandates Reform Act are:

Title I: Legislative Accountability and Reform. Any bill passed by committee must be submitted to the director of the Congressional Budget Office so that any federal mandates may be identified. No bill which contains any such mandate imposing a direct cost of more than fifty million dollars on a state, local or tribal government or a cost of more than one hundred million dollars on the private sector may be sent to the full chamber without a corresponding appropriation.

Title II: Regulatory Accountability and Reform. Federal agencies must assess the cost of all new regulations to state, local and tribal governments and the private sector before issuing them. Where such costs exceed one hundred million dollars, the issuing agency must consult with the affected governments and make sure that no less burdensome alternative exists.

Title III: Review of Federal Mandates. The U.S. Advisory Commission on Intergovernmental Relations was directed to review the role of mandates in relations between the federal government and state, local and tribal governments and to recommend to Congress and to the president opportunities to simplify or eliminate federal mandates.

Title IV: Judicial Review. Federal courts may compel agencies to comply with their responsibilities under Title II.
