= Student Veterans of America =

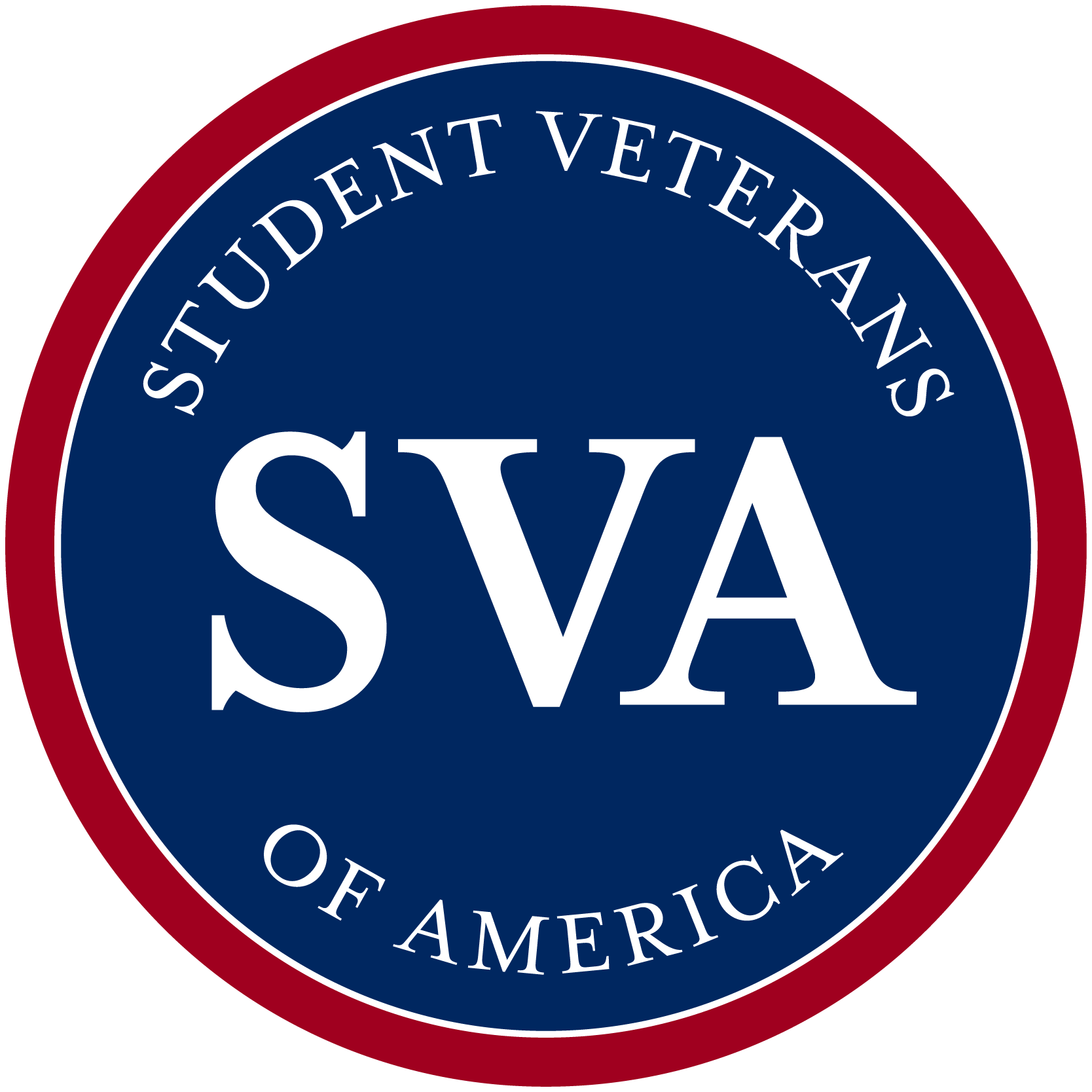
- Abbreviation: SVA
- Formation: 2008
- Type: 501(c)(3)
- Purpose: "Through a network of nearly 1,600 chapters, SVA has been inspiring tomorrow's leaders since 2008 to ensure they achieve their greatest potential."
- Headquarters: Washington, DC
- Website: studentveterans.org

Student Veterans of America (SVA), is a 501(c)(3) non-profit organization focused on addressing the needs and concerns of American military veterans in higher education. SVA is best known for being an umbrella organization for student veterans' groups that advocates for improvements in veterans educational benefits. Its efforts, combined with other veterans' service organizations, led to passage of the Post-9/11 Veterans Educational Assistance Act of 2008. Senator Jim Webb (D-VA), a lead sponsor of the legislation, has cited SVA's efforts as one of the primary reasons the new G.I. Bill was signed into law on June 30, 2008.

== Organization structure ==
SVA has two major components: the executive leadership staff at SVA National Headquarters, and the on-campus SVA chapters of student veterans. The local SVA chapters are student groups that have formed on college and university campuses to provide peer-to-peer networks for veterans who are attending those schools. The chapters are designed to be an advocate for student veterans, and to help bridge the campus-to-career transition. They coordinate on-campus and community outreach activities, facilitate pre-professional networking, and provide a touchstone for student veterans in higher education. These SVA chapters are an important part of ensuring that every veteran is successful after their service.

The executive leadership staff facilitates communication between the SVA chapters, connects them with external resources, and organizes these chapters to advocate at the state and national level for the common needs of student veterans.

=== Chapter Affiliates ===
The Bureau of Labor Statistics recently highlighted the inextricable link between education and employment in noting that over 60% of all new jobs created from now until 2018 will require a postsecondary degree or credential. Veterans, however, face significant barriers to degree attainment that range from feeling like an outsider on a campus of 18-year-old traditional students to coping with the visible and invisible wounds of war. SVA classifies these barriers into three categories: administrative, reintegration, and academic. Administrative challenges are linked to accessing benefits and navigating campus bureaucracies. Reintegration issues arise as transitioning veterans try to develop a new identity and sense of belonging. Academic struggles typically stem from long periods away from academia due to military service. Vincent Tinto, renowned education researcher, notes that without peer support these challenges can become insurmountable obstacles that lead to isolation and high dropout rates.

SVA chapters do not pay any dues to associate with the national organization and each group is encouraged to utilize national best-practices to address local issues. A recent RAND study noted that 61% of student veterans found the support they received from fellow veterans as “quite or extremely helpful to the pursuit of their educational goals.” SVA chapters are fulfilling a critical function on hundreds of campuses nationwide.

There are nearly 1,600 SVA chapters.

=== National Headquarters ===
Student Veterans of America's national office is located in Washington, DC and consists of a number of professional, paid staff members.

== History ==
=== SVA’s Predecessors ===
Before the end of World War II, President Franklin Roosevelt signed into law the Servicemen's Readjustment Act of 1944, otherwise known as the G.I. Bill of Rights. After demobilizing, returning veterans flooded colleges and universities around the country. Not only did these student veterans face basic challenges associated with reintegrating into civilian life, but schools were unprepared for this influx of students, which led to additional problems for veterans like severe housing shortages and lack of transitional assistance. Student veterans banded together, forming peer-to-peer support networks to overcome these challenges and earn their college degrees.

Through the '70s, '80s and '90s, veterans continued to transition to campus following their military service, albeit in smaller numbers. The revised Montgomery G.I. Bill was offered as a recruitment incentive for the all-volunteer force. Some of the local student veteran groups that formed on campuses after conflicts in Korea and Vietnam, like those at Northern Illinois University and the University of Wisconsin-Madison, still exist today.

=== SVA’s Genesis – The Post-9/11 G.I. Bill ===
Following the September 11, 2001 attacks, the U.S. launched Operation Enduring Freedom (OEF) (Afghanistan) and Operation Iraqi Freedom (OIF) (Iraq). As OEF and OIF veterans returned home to use G.I. Bill benefits, they found that their campuses did not provide adequate support services to assist student veterans as they worked towards their educational goals.

Lacking support, student veterans decided to organize on campuses across the country. These groups began to connect with one another through social media - spreading best practices, sharing success stories, and supporting fellow chapters to further strengthen the student veteran community. In 2008, members from roughly 20 schools convened in Chicago to formalize this grassroots movement and found Student Veterans of America.

SVA was officially incorporated between the 18th and 20 January 2008 to provide programs, resources, and support to the ever-evolving network of local student veteran organizations—today known as SVA chapters.

Concurrently, SVA and a number of Veteran Service Organizations were tirelessly advocating for an overhaul of the G.I. Bill to address the needs of the 21st Century student veteran. Six months after SVA's founding, President George W. Bush signed into law the Post 9/11 GI Bill.

SVA programs and initiatives fall under these categories:

=== Support Students ===
The heart of SVA is the student-led chapter. SVA supports a network of over 1,500 schools and over 750,000 student veterans. At the individual level, SVA empowers veterans to be informed consumers of higher education and make the most of the transition to civilian life.

=== Train Tomorrow's Leaders ===
SVA hosts Regional Summits and the Leadership Institute for students. The sessions include training in chapter management, budgeting, and strategic planning.

=== Protect the G.I. Bill ===
SVA is a guardian and steward of both the Post-9/11 G.I. Bill and Forever G.I. Bill, and SVA founders had an important part in the bill's genesis. SVA's Government Affairs team advises lawmakers and advocates in eight issue areas such as student debt and STEM fields.

=== Conduct Groundbreaking Research ===
The initial Million Records Project (MRP) offered facts to policymakers, service providers, colleges, and the public. SVA has launched two new research initiatives: The National Veteran Education Success Tracker (NVEST) adds education levels, majors and completion rates of Bill recipients and The SVA Spotlight survey provides annual demographic insights.

=== Plan the SVA Annual National Conference ===
The SVA National Conference is the nation's largest annual gathering of student veterans.

The 14th NatCon was held in Orlando, Florida on January 7–9, 2022. The Student Veteran of the Year was awarded to Katherine Martinez from Old Dominion University. The SVA Chapter of the Year was awarded to Georgetown University.

The 15th annual NatCon was held again in Orlando, Florida on January 5-7, 2023. The Student Veteran of the Year was awarded to Josh Jones from Loyola University. The SVA Chapter of the Year was awarded to the University of South Carolina.

The 19th annual NatCon will be held in Grapevine, Texas on January 4-6, 2027.

=== Develop Sustainable Support ===
SVA's development team builds corporate partnerships that fund student-veteran success.

== Board of directors ==
The SVA Board of Directors has ten members. The current board leadership is as follows.

Pamela Erickson, Board Chair. Pamela Erickson is vice president of Global Branding and Corporate Citizenship for Raytheon Technologies (NYSE: RTX). Raytheon Technologies, with 2017 sales of $25.3 billion and 64,000 employees worldwide, is a technology and innovation leader specializing in defense, civil government and cybersecurity solutions throughout the world.

Chris Cortez, Vice Chair. Chris Cortez is Vice President of Military Affairs at Microsoft, a position focused on providing IT career opportunities to transitioning U.S. military members and veterans. In this role he oversees the Microsoft Software and Systems Academy designed to prepare transitioning military personnel for jobs in the IT industry, works closely with Microsoft's military recruiting team, and is an advocate for Microsoft employees who have served in the military.

== Board of Advisors ==
The SVA Board of Advisors has twelve members. The current board leadership is as follows.

Geoffrey J. Deutsch, Chair. Geoff Deutsch has spent nearly 25 years helping transform large systems for delivering healthcare and human services. Geoff began his career as a "turnaround” executive with international hospital systems, managed care companies and health technology firms, where he established a record of rapid, breakthrough performance improvements. His introduction to the nonprofit sector came when Elizabeth Dole hired him in to help transform the American Red Cross. As a volunteer, Geoff has supported the Presidents and Boards of several national charities, with a focus on applying business principles to the nonprofit sector.
