= Chapter 33 (G.I. Bill of Rights) =

American federal legislation

In July 2008 the Post-9/11 GI Bill was signed into law, creating a new robust education benefits program rivaling the WWII-Era GI Bill of Rights. The new Post-9/11 GI Bill, which went into effect on August 1, 2009, provides education benefits for service members who served on active duty for 90 or more days since September 10, 2001. These benefits are tiered based on the number of days served on active duty, creating a benefit package that gives current and previously activated National Guard and Reserve members the same benefits as active duty servicemembers.

The Department of Veterans Affairs is currently accepting applications for the Post-9/11 GI Bill. Once the VA receives applications, applicants' eligibility for the Post-9/11 GI Bill is determined and applicants are issued a Certificate of Eligibility. Veterans must apply using the VA Form 22-1990, which includes the instructions needed to begin the application process. Post-9/11 benefits are not available to cover training or education programs completed before July 31, 2009.

== The New Post-9/11 GI Bill ==
The New Post-9/11 GI Bill offers a new set of benefits for service members and veterans attending education and training programs taken at an accredited college or university. The new benefits include up to 100% tuition and fees (paid directly to the school) for public in-state institutions and, for the 2012-2013 academic year, up to $18,077.50 for private/foreign institutions (paid directly to the school), a monthly living/housing stipend, up to $1,000 a year for books and supplies, and more.

These new Post-9/11 GI Bill benefit payments are tiered based on the amount creditable active-duty service a veteran has since Sept. 10, 2001.

=== Pending Changes to the Post-9/11 GI Bill ===
New for 2011 – In December 2010 Congress passed the Post-9/11 Veterans Education Assistance Improvements Act of 2010. The new law expands eligibility to include members of the National Guard who served on Title 32 or in the full-time Active Guard and Reserve (AGR).

The new law also includes a new (reduced) housing stipend for online (distance) learners enables active-duty servicemembers and their GI Bill eligible spouses to receive the annual $1,000 book stipend, adds several vocational, certification and OJT options, and removes the state-by-state tuition caps for veterans enrolled at public (state-operated) colleges and universities.

In addition, the new GI Bill 2.0 includes new tuition and fees coverage caps for veterans attending private universities – $17,500 a year, prorates the housing stipend based on the student's rate of pursuit, and eliminates the "interval pay" which allowed veterans to continue to receive payments during scheduled school breaks (i.e. winter and spring breaks).

The bulk of these changes go into effect August and October 2011.

== Tuition and Fees ==
If a veteran is eligible, VA will pay tuition & fees payment directly to their school. This payment is not to exceed the in-state tuition rate for the school, or $18,077 per academic year for private or foreign schools.

=== Yellow Ribbon Program ===
The new GI Bill also includes a provision to help students avoid some or all of the out-of-pocket tuition and fees associated with education programs that may exceed the Post-9/11 GI Bill tuition benefit. The YRP is not automatic, schools must enter into an agreement with the VA to share the expense.

To qualify to receive the Yellow Ribbon benefits a veteran must meet the following criteria:

- Served an aggregate period of active duty after September 10, 2001, of at least 36 months;
- Were honorably discharged from active duty for a service connected disability and have served a minimum of 30 continuous days after September 10, 2001;
- Are a dependent eligible for Transfer of Entitlement under the Post-9/11 GI Bill based on a veteran's service under the eligibility criteria listed above.

== Monthly Living Stipend ==
As an eligible veteran or member of the National Guard or Selected Reserve, a service member may receive a monthly housing allowance (living stipend) based on the ZIP code of the location of the school they are attending – not a veteran's home ZIP code. This stipend currently averages $1,200 a month, but can run as high as $3,200.

This stipend is based on the DoD's Basic Allowance for Housing (BAH) for an E-5 with dependents. This stipend does not require students to live on campus.

NOTE: Servicemembers currently on active duty and veterans (and eligible family members) taking courses on a half-time or less basis and/or taking 100% of their classes at a distance (online etc.)* do not qualify for the monthly housing stipend.

- Beginning October 1, 2011 Students attending 100% of their courses online will be eligible for a stipend equal to half of the stipend they would get for being enrolled in campus based courses.

== Book and Supply Stipend ==
A service member may receive an annual book stipend of up to $1,000 if they are a veteran or member of the Guard or Selected Reserve. This stipend will be paid at the beginning of each term. It is paid proportionately based on the number of credits taken by each student at $41.62 per credit hour.

NOTE: Veterans currently on active duty are not eligible for the Book Stipend. However, beginning October 1, 2011, Active-duty service members and their eligible spouses will be eligible for the annual book stipend

== Other Benefits ==
=== One-Time Relocation Allowance ===
A veteran may also receive a one-time rural relocation benefit payment of $500.00 to help cover the cost of relocating from a rural location to attend school. To qualify, a service member must:

- Be an otherwise eligible veteran.
- Reside in a county with 6 persons or less per square mile (as determined by the most recent decennial census) and:
- Either physically relocate at least 500 miles (800 km) to attend an educational institution

- or -

- Travel by air to physically attend an educational institution if no other land-based transportation exists.

=== Certification Exams, Work Study, and Tutorial Assistance ===
Eligible veterans also qualify for a one-time reimbursement of up to $2,000 for a certification or licensing exam, work-study programs, and $100 a month for tutorial assistance.

Benefit Update: Beginning August 1, 2011, VA will lift the single exam restriction, allowing eligible veterans and service members to take multiple exams.

Benefit Update: As of October 1, 2011, The Post-9/11 GI Bill will now pay for flight training. In order to qualify, a service member or veteran must have a private pilots license and a valid medical certification before the VA will pay for their training.

== Benefit Transferability ==
The Department of Defense (DoD) is authorized to allow individuals who, on or after August 1, 2009, have served at least 6 years in the Armed Forces, and who agree to serve at least another 4 years in the Armed Forces to transfer unused entitlement to their Spouse. Once the member has reached their 10-year anniversary they may choose to transfer the benefit to any dependent(s) (spouse, children). The Department of Defense may, by regulation, impose additional eligibility requirements and limit the number of months transferable to not less than 18 months.

== Eligibility Criteria for Post-9/11 GI Bill Benefits ==
A service member is eligible if they have served a minimum of 90 days on active duty after September 10, 2001. This covers active duty served as a member of the Armed Forces or as a result of a call or order to active duty from a reserve component (National Guard and Reserve) under certain sections of title 10.

However, some periods of active duty service are excluded. Periods of service under the following do not count toward qualification for the Post-9/11 GI Bill:

- Active Guard Reserve (AGR) (Title 32);
- ROTC under 10 U.S.C. 2107(b);
- Service academy contract period;
- Service terminated due to defective enlistment agreement;
- Service used for loan repayment; and
- Active service as a National Guard Member under title 32 U.S.C. for the purpose of organizing, administering, recruiting, instructing, or training and active service under section 502(f) of title 32 for the purpose of responding to a national emergency.

Selected reserve service used to establish eligibility under the Montgomery GI Bill (MGIB chapter 30), MGIB for Selected Reserve (MGIB-SR Chapter 1606), or the Reserve Education Assistance Program (REAP chapter 1607).

Further Details From the VA: At a minimum, a service member must have served at least 30 days of continuous active duty service after September 10, 2001 and be discharged due to a service-connected disability, or served an aggregate of 90 days of active duty service after September 10, 2001, and:

Be honorably discharged from Armed Forces; or

Be released from Armed Forces with service characterized as honorable and placed on the retired list, temporary disability retired list, or transferred to the Fleet Reserve or the Fleet Marine Corps Reserve; or

Be released from the Armed Forces with service characterized as honorable for further service in a reserve component; or

- Be discharged or released from Armed Forces for:
- EPTS (Existed Prior to Service)
- HDSP (Hardship) or
- CIWD (Condition Interfered with Duty); or
- Continue to be on active duty.

== Post-9/11 GI Bill Benefit Tiers ==
All Post 9/11 GI Bill benefit payments are based on the amount of creditable active-duty service each veteran has since Sept. 10, 2001. If a service member is an active-duty, National Guard, Selected Reserve member, or veterans who has served on active-duty for 90 or more days since Sept. 10, 2001 the following percentage of benefits apply based on their Post-9/11 Active-duty service:

- 100% – Requires at least 36 cumulative months (Includes Entry Level or Skills Training time)
- 100% – Requires at least 30 continuous days on active duty and discharged due to service-connected disability (Includes Entry Level or Skills Training time)
- 90% – Requires at least 30 cumulative months (Includes Entry Level or Skills Training time)
- 80% – Requires at least 24 cumulative months (Includes include Entry Level or Skills Training time)
- 70% – Requires at least 18 cumulative months (Cannot include Entry Level or Skills Training time)
- 60% – Requires at least 12 cumulative months (Cannot include Entry Level or Skills Training time)
- 50% – Requires at least 6 cumulative months (Cannot include Entry Level or Skills Training time)
- 40% – Requires 90 aggregate days (Cannot include Entry Level or Skills Training time)
