= Unfunded mandate =

Legal obligation without additional funding

An unfunded mandate is a statute or regulation that requires any entity to perform certain actions, with no money provided for fulfilling the requirements. This can be imposed on state or local government, as well as private individuals or organizations. The key distinction is that the statute or regulation is not accompanied by funding to fulfill the requirement.

An example in the United States, would be those federal mandates that induce "responsibility, action, procedure or anything else that is imposed by constitutional, administrative, executive, or judicial action" for state and local governments and/or the private sector.

As of 1992, 172 federal mandates obliged state or local governments to fund programs to some extent. Beginning with the Civil Rights Act of 1957 and the Civil Rights Act of 1964, as well as the Voting Rights Act of 1965, the United States federal government has designed laws that require state and local government spending to promote national goals. During the 1970s, the national government promoted education, mental health, and environmental programs by implementing grant projects at a state and local level; the grants were so common that the federal assistance for these programs made up over a quarter of state and local budgets. The rise in federal mandates led to more mandate regulation. During the Reagan Administration, Executive Order 12291 and the State and Local Cost Estimate Act of 1981 were passed, which implemented a careful examination of the true costs of federal unfunded mandates. More reform for federal mandates came in 1995 with the Unfunded Mandates Reform Act (UMRA), which promoted a Congressional focus on the costs imposed onto intergovernmental entities and the private sector because of federal mandates. Familiar examples of Federal Unfunded Mandates in the United States include the Americans with Disabilities Act and Medicaid.

== Background ==
An "intergovernmental mandate" generally refers to the responsibilities or activities that one level of government imposes on another by legislative, executive or judicial action. According to the Unfunded Mandates Reform Act of 1995 (UMRA), an intergovernmental mandate can take various forms:

- An enforceable duty – this refers to any type of legislation, statute or regulation that either requires or proscribes an action of state or local governments, excluding actions imposed as conditions of receiving federal aid.
- Certain changes in large entitlement programs – this refers to instances when new conditions or reductions in large entitlement programs, providing $5 billion or more annually to state or local governments, are imposed by the federal government.
- A reduction in federal funding for an existing mandate – this refers to a reduction or elimination of federal funding authorized to cover the costs of an existing mandate.

A 1993 study conducted by Price Waterhouse, sponsored by the National Association of Counties, determined that in fiscal year 1993 counties in the US spent $4.8 billion for twelve unfunded federal mandates. Medicaid was one of these twelve unfunded mandates, and comprised the second largest item in state budgets, accounting for almost 13 percent of state general revenues in 1993.

Mandates can be applied either vertically or horizontally. Vertically applied mandates are directed by a level of government at a single department or program. Conversely, horizontally applied, or "crosscutting", mandates refer to mandates that affect various departments or programs. For example, a mandate requiring county health departments to provide outpatient mental health programs would be considered a vertically applied mandate, whereas a requirement that all offices in a given jurisdiction to become handicap-accessible would be considered a horizontally applied mandate.

== History ==
Federal unfunded mandates can be traced back to the post-World War II years, when the federal government initiated national programs in education, mental health services, and environmental protection. The method for implementing these projects at the state and local level was to involve state and local governments. In the 1970s, the federal government utilized grants as a way to increase state and local participation, which resulted in federal assistance constituting over 25 percent of state and local budgets.

The first wave of major mandates occurred in the 1960s and 1970s, concerning civil rights, education, and the environment. The arrival of the Reagan administration ostensibly undermined various federal mandate efforts, as the executive branch promised to decrease federal regulatory efforts. For example, the passage of Executive Order 12291 required a cost-benefit analysis and an Office of Management and Budget clearance on proposed agency regulations, and the State and Local Cost Estimate Act of 1981 required the Congressional Budget Office to determine the state and local cost effects of proposed federal legislation moving through the Legislative Branch. However, the U.S. Advisory Commission on Intergovernmental Relations (ACIR) reported that, during the 1980s, more major intergovernmental regulatory programs were enacted than during the 1970s.

According to a 1995 Brookings Institution report, in 1980 there were 36 laws that qualified as unfunded mandates. Despite opposition from the Reagan administration and George H. W. Bush administration, an additional 27 laws that could be categorized as unfunded mandates went into effect between 1982 and 1991.

The U.S. Supreme Court has been involved in deciding the federal government's role in the U.S. governmental system based on constitutionality. During the period between the New Deal era and the mid-1980s the court generally utilized an expansive interpretation of the interstate commerce clause and the 14th Amendment to validate the growth of the federal government's involvement in domestic policymaking. For example, the 1985 Supreme Court case Garcia v. San Antonio Metropolitan Transit Authority affirmed the ability for the federal government to directly regulate state and local governmental affairs.

The increase of mandates in the 1980s and 1990s incited state and local protest. In October 1993, state and local interest groups sponsored a National Unfunded Mandates Day, which involved press conferences and appeals to congressional delegations about mandate relief. In early 1995, Congress passed unfunded mandate reform legislation.

In 1992 the court determined in various cases that the US Constitution provides state and locality protections concerning unfunded mandate enactments. For example, in the 1992 case New York v. United States, the Court struck down a federal law that regulated the disposal of low-level radioactive waste, which utilized the Tenth Amendment to the United States Constitution to require states to dispose of the radioactive material.

== Examples ==
Unfunded mandates are most commonly utilized in regulation of civil rights, anti-poverty programs and environmental protection programs.

=== Clean Air Act ===
The Clean Air Act was passed in 1963 to support the United States Environmental Protection Agency (EPA), established on December 2, 1970, in developing research programs looking into air pollution problems and solutions. The EPA received authority to research air quality. The 1970 Amendments to the Clean Air Act established the National Ambient Air Quality Standards, authorized requirements for control of motor vehicle emissions, increased the federal enforcement authority but required states to implement plans to adhere to these standards. The 1990 Amendments to the Clean Air Act of 1970 expanded and modified the National Ambient Air Quality Standards and expanded and modified enforcement authority. The amendments increased the mandates on states to comply with the federal standards for air quality. States have had to write up State Implementation Plans, have them approved by the EPA and must also fund the implementation.

=== The Americans with Disabilities Act of 1990 ===
The Americans with Disabilities Act of 1990 prohibits discrimination based on disability, requires existing public facilities to be made accessible, requires new facilities to comply with accessibility expectations, and requires that employers provide anything a disabled employee might need, such as a sign language interpreter. Tax incentives encourage employers to hire people with disabilities. State institutions and local employers are expected to pay for changes made to existing facilities and are responsible for making sure that new facilities are in compliance with the federal requirements under the ADA.

=== Medicaid ===
Medicaid is a health program for low-income families and people with certain medical needs in the United States. It is funded jointly by the federal and state governments, but implemented by states. Federal funding covers a variable portion of at least half of Medicaid costs, and states are expected to cover the remainder. This means that any federally mandated increase in Medicaid spending forces states to spend more. However, as state participation in Medicaid is voluntary, it is not technically an unfunded mandate.

=== EMTALA ===
The Emergency Medical Treatment and Active Labor Act (EMTALA) was passed by the United States Congress in 1986 to halt certain practices of patient dumping. The act requires hospitals accepting payment from Medicare to provide emergency treatment to any patient coming to their emergency department, regardless of their insurance coverage or ability to pay. Though hospitals could theoretically choose to not participate in Medicare placing them outside of EMTALA's scope, very few do not accept payments from Medicare causing EMTALA to apply to nearly all US hospitals. Though EMTALA infers an obligation to provide certain emergency care, the statute does not contain any provision regarding funding or financing of said emergency care. EMTALA could therefore be characterized as an unfunded mandate.

=== The No Child Left Behind Act of 2001 ===
The 2001 No Child Left Behind Act was passed in response to widespread concern about the quality of public education in America. The act was meant to decrease the gap between students who were performing very well and students who were performing poorly. The act required schools receiving federal funding to administer statewide standardized tests to students at the end of each year. If students did not show improvement from year to year on these tests, their schools were asked to work to improve the quality of the education by hiring highly qualified teachers and by tutoring struggling students. To continue receiving Federal grants, states had to develop plans that demonstrated their steps to improve the quality of education in their schools. The No Child Left Behind Act mandated that states fund the improvements in their schools and provide the appropriate training for less qualified teachers. Federally mandated K-12 education is also a (mostly) unfunded mandate.

== Criticism ==
Critics argue that unfunded mandates are inefficient and are an unfair imposition of the national government on the smaller governments. While many scholars do not object to the goals of the mandates, the way they are enforced and written are criticized for their ineffectiveness. State and local governments do not always disagree with the spirit of the mandate, but they sometimes object to the high costs they must bear to carry out the objectives.

The debate on unfunded federal mandates is visible in cases such as New York v. United States, mentioned above. In School District of Pontiac, Michigan v. Duncan, the plaintiffs alleged that the school district need not comply with the No Child Left Behind Act of 2001 because the federal government did not provide them sufficient funding; the court concluded that insufficient federal funds were not a valid reason to not comply with a federal mandate.

== Unfunded Mandates Reform Act ==
=== Purpose ===
The Unfunded Mandates Reform Act (UMRA) was approved by the 104th Congress on March 22, 1995, and became effective October 5, 1995, during the Clinton administration. It is public law 104-4. The official legislation summarizes the bill as being: "An Act: To curb the practice of imposing unfunded Federal mandates on States and local governments; [...] and to ensure that the Federal Government pays the costs incurred by those governments in complying with certain requirements under Federal statutes and regulations, and for other purposes."

UMRA was enacted to avoid imposing mandates, when said mandates did not include federal funding to help the SLTG (State, Local, and Tribal Governments) carry out the goals of the mandate. It also allowed the Congressional Budget Office to estimate the cost of mandates to SLTGs and to the private sector, and allows federal agencies issuing mandates to estimate the costs of mandates to the entities that said mandates regulate.

=== Application ===
Most of the act's provisions apply to proposed and final rules for which a notice of the proposed rule was published, and that include a Federal mandate that could result in the expenditure of funds by SLTGs or the private sector of or in excess of $100 million in any given year. If a mandate meets these conditions, a written statement must be provided that includes the legal authority for the rule, a cost-benefit assessment, a description of the macroeconomic effects that the mandate will likely have, and a summary of concerns from the SLTG and how they were addressed. An agency enforcing the mandate must also choose the least-costly option that still achieves the goals of the mandate, as well as consult with elected officials of the SLTG to allow for their input on the implementation of the mandate and its goals. Section 203 of UMRA is a bit more extensive in that it applies to all regulatory requirements that significantly affect small governments, and requires federal agencies to provide notice of the requirements to the government(s), enable the officials of the government(s) to provide their input on the mandate, and inform and educate the government(s) on the requirements for implementation of the mandate.

UMRA allows the United States Congress to decline unfunded federal mandates within legislation if such mandates are estimated to cost more than the threshold amounts estimated by the Congressional Budget Office. UMRA does not apply to "conditions of federal assistance; duties stemming from participation in voluntary federal programs; rules issued by independent regulatory agencies; rules issued without a general notice of proposed rulemaking; and rules and legislative provisions that cover individual constitutional rights, discrimination, emergency assistance, grant accounting and auditing procedures, national security, treaty obligations, and certain elements of Social Security".

=== Effectiveness ===
Ever since UMRA was proposed, it has remained unclear, how effective the legislation actually is at limiting the burdens imposed by unfunded mandates on SLTGs, and whether or not unfunded mandates need to be limited so strictly. Proponents of the Act argue that UMRA is needed to limit legislation that imposes obligations on SLTGs and that creates higher costs and less efficiency, while opponents argue that sometimes federal unfunded mandates are necessary to achieve a national goal that state and local governments don't fund voluntarily. Opponents also question the effectiveness of the bill due to the aforementioned restrictions.

== 2015 Unfunded Mandates and Information Transparency Act ==
The Act was written to amend UMRA by having the CBO compare the authorized level of funding in legislation to the costs of carrying out any changes. It was done by also amending the Congressional Budget Act of 1974. The bill was introduced by Republican North Carolina Representative Virginia Foxx and passed by the House on February 4, 2015.

Foxx had authored a previous version of this bill, which also passed the house, as H.R. 899 (113th Congress) in February 2014. The bill would allow private companies and trade associations to look at proposed rules before they are announced to the public. The concern is that private companies could weaken upgrades to public protections.

== See also ==
- Debt crisis
- Defined benefit pension plan#Unfunded pension plans
- Pensions crisis
