= 110th United States Congress =

2007–2009 U.S. legislative term

←	109th	111th	→
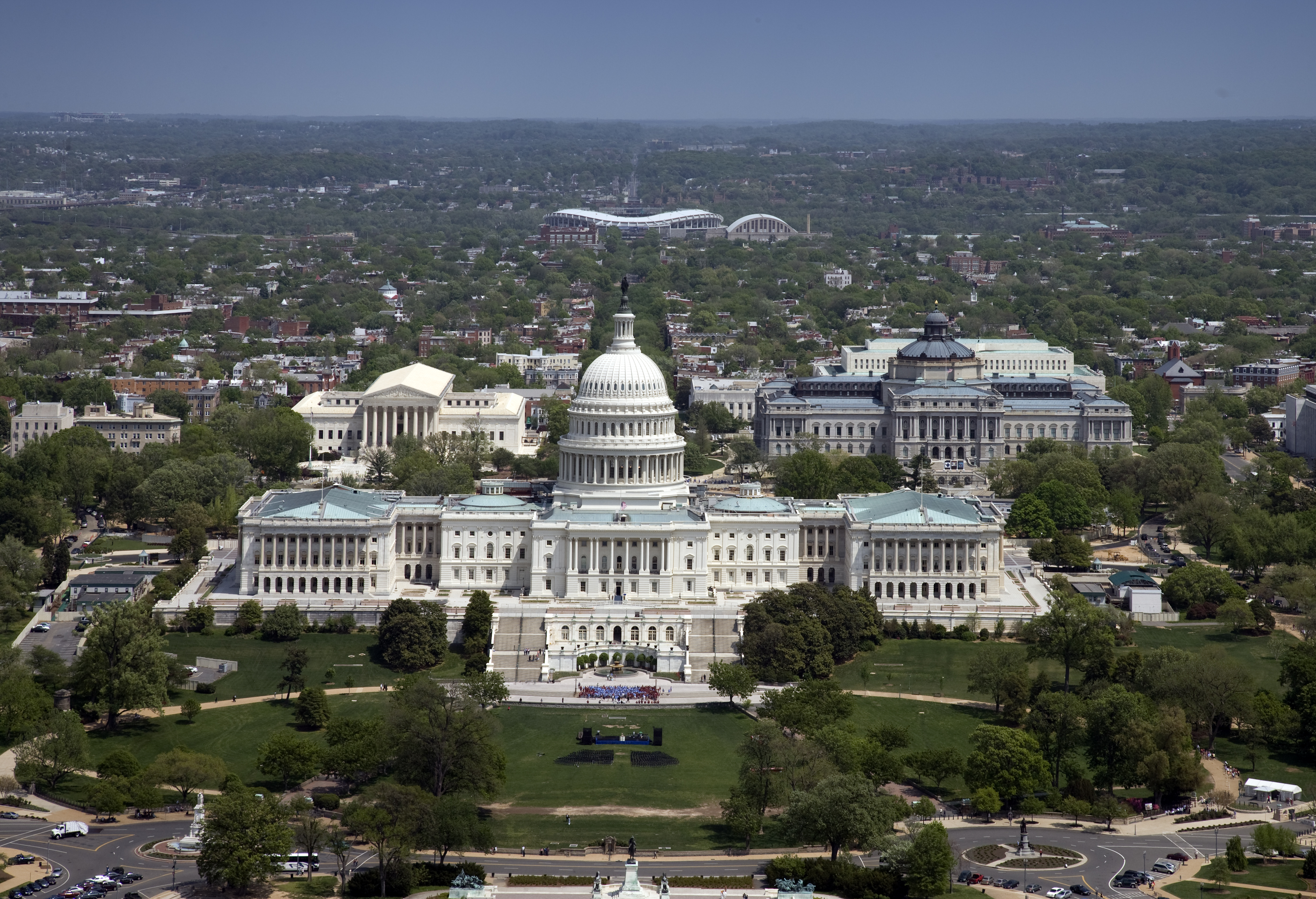
- United States Capitol (2007)

Overview
- Legislative body: United States Congress
- Jurisdiction: United States
- Term: January 3, 2007 – January 3, 2009

Senate
- Members: 100
- President: Dick Cheney (R)
- President pro tempore: Robert Byrd (D)
- Party control: Democratic (through caucus)

House of Representatives
- Members: 435 representatives 5 non-voting delegates
- Speaker: Nancy Pelosi (D)
- Party control: Democratic

Sessions
- 1st: January 4, 2007 – December 19, 2007
- 2nd: January 3, 2008 – January 3, 2009

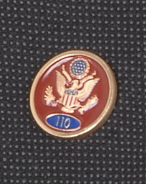
House of Representatives member pin for the 110th U.S. Congress

The 110th United States Congress was a meeting of the legislative branch of the United States federal government, between January 3, 2007, and January 3, 2009, during the last two years of the Presidency of George W. Bush. It was composed of the Senate and the House of Representatives. The apportionment of seats in the House was based on the 2000 U.S. census.

The Democratic Party won a majority in both chambers, giving them full control of Congress for the first time since the 103rd Congress in 1993, which was also the previous time they controlled the House.

Officially in the Senate, there were 49 Democrats, 49 Republicans, and two independents, but because both of the independents caucused with the Democrats, this gave the Democrats an operational majority. No Democratic-held seats had fallen to the Republican Party in the 2006 elections.

This is the most recent Congress to feature Republican senators from Minnesota (Norm Coleman), New Mexico (Pete Domenici) and Oregon (Gordon Smith), in which Domenici retired and the other two lost re-election at the end of the Congress.

Democrat Nancy Pelosi became the first female speaker of the House. The House also received the first Muslim (Keith Ellison) and Buddhist (Hank Johnson and Mazie Hirono) members of Congress.

== Major events ==
Members debated initiatives such as the Democrats' 100-Hour Plan and the Iraq War troop surge of 2007.

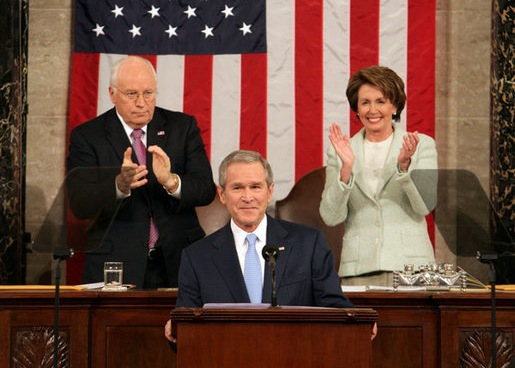
President Bush delivered the 2007 State of the Union Address on January 23, 2007

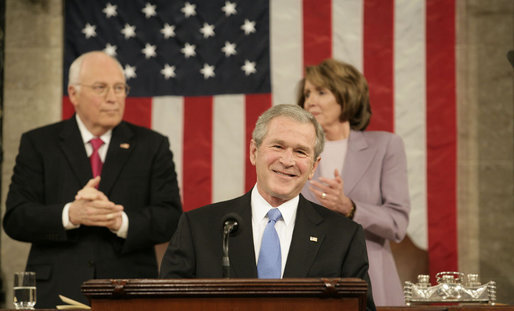
President Bush delivered the 2008 State of the Union Address on January 28, 2008

=== Support for the Iraq War ===
Following President Bush's 2007 State of the Union Address, Congress debated his proposal to create a troop surge to increase security in Iraq. The House of Representatives passed a non-binding measure opposing the surge and then a $124 billion emergency spending measure to fund the war, which included language that dictated troop levels and withdrawal schedules. President Bush, however, vetoed the bill as promised, making this his second veto while in office. Both houses of Congress subsequently passed a bill funding the war without timelines, but with benchmarks for the Iraqi government and money for other spending projects like disaster relief.

=== Other events ===
- January 23, 2007: President Bush delivered the 2007 State of the Union Address
- August 2, 2007: The Republican minority disputed the results of a vote to recommit. This led to an investigation by the House Select Committee on Voting Irregularities.
- December 18, 2007: The Senate set a record for the most cloture votes.
- January 2008: Start of the Great Recession
- January 28, 2008: President Bush delivered the 2008 State of the Union Address
- September 15, 2008: The 2008 financial crisis culminates in the Bankruptcy of Lehman Brothers.
- November 4, 2008: General elections - Democrats increased their congressional majorities and Senator Barack Obama was elected president.

== Major legislation ==
These are partial lists of prominent enacted legislation and pending bills. (Note: See also: 2008 Congressional Record, Vol. 154, Page D845 , Resume of Congressional Activity)

=== Enacted ===
- February 2, 2007– House Page Board Revision Act of 2007, Pub. L. 110–2 (text) (PDF), 121 Stat. 4
- May 25, 2007– U.S. Troop Readiness, Veterans' Care, Katrina Recovery, and Iraq Accountability Appropriations Act, 2007, Pub. L. 110–28 (text) (PDF), 121 Stat. 112, including Title VIII: Fair Minimum Wage Act of 2007, 121 Stat. 188
- June 14, 2007– Preserving United States Attorney Independence Act of 2007, Pub. L. 110–34 (text) (PDF), 121 Stat. 224
- July 26, 2007– Foreign Investment and National Security Act of 2007, Pub. L. 110–49 (text) (PDF), 121 Stat. 246
- August 3, 2007– Implementing Recommendations of the 9/11 Commission Act of 2007, Pub. L. 110–53 (text) (PDF), 121 Stat. 266
- August 5, 2007 — Protect America Act of 2007, Pub. L. 110–55 (text) (PDF), 121 Stat. 552
- August 9, 2007 --- America COMPETES Act, Pub.L. 110-69
- September 14, 2007– Honest Leadership and Open Government Act, Pub. L. 110–81 (text) (PDF), 121 Stat. 735
- September 20, 2007 --- Native American $1 Coin Act, Pub.L. 110-82
- September 27, 2007 --- Food and Drug Administration Amendments Act of 2007, Pub.L. 110-85
- November 8, 2007– Water Resources Development Act of 2007, Pub. L. 110–114 (text) (PDF), 121 Stat. 1041 (Veto overridden)
- December 19, 2007– Energy Independence and Security Act of 2007, Pub. L. 110–140 (text) (PDF), 121 Stat. 1492
- December 20, 2007 --- Mortgage Forgiveness Debt Relief Act of 2007, Pub.L. 110-142
- December 31, 2007 --- OPEN Government Act of 2007, Pub.L. 110-175
- January 28, 2008 --- National Defense Authorization Act for Fiscal Year 2008, Pub.L. 110-181
- February 13, 2008 — Economic Stimulus Act of 2008, Pub. L. 110–185 (text) (PDF), 122 Stat. 613
- April 9, 2008 --- Second Chance Act of 2007, Pub.L. 110-199
- April 24, 2008 --- Newborn Screening Saves Lives Act of 2007, Pub.L. 110-204
- May 8, 2008 --- Consolidated Natural Resources Act of 2008, Pub.L. 110-229
- May 21, 2008– Genetic Information Nondiscrimination Act, Pub. L. 110–233 (text) (PDF), 122 Stat. 881
- May 22, 2008– Food and Energy Security Act of 2007 (2007 Farm Bill), Pub. L. 110–234 (text) (PDF), 122 Stat. 923 (Veto overridden)
- June 18, 2008 --- Food, Conservation, and Energy Act of 2008, Pub.L. 110-246 (Veto overridden)
- June 20, 2008 --- Federal Food Donation Act of 2008, Pub.L. 110-247
- June 30, 2008– Supplemental Appropriations Act of 2008, Pub. L. 110–252 (text) (PDF), 122 Stat. 2323, including Title V: Post-9/11 Veterans Educational Assistance Act of 2008 ("G.I. Bill 2008")
- July 10, 2008 — FISA Amendments Act of 2008, Pub. L. 110–261 (text) (PDF), 122 Stat. 2436
- July 15, 2008 --- Medicare Improvements for Patients and Providers Act of 2008, Pub.L. 110-275 (Veto overridden)
- July 29, 2008– Tom Lantos Block Burmese JADE (Junta's Anti-Democratic Efforts) Act of 2008, Pub. L. 110–286 (text) (PDF), 122 Stat. 2632
- July 29, 2008 --- Clean Boating Act of 2008, Pub.L. 110-288
- July 30, 2008– Housing and Economic Recovery Act of 2008, Pub. L. 110–289 (text) (PDF), 122 Stat. 2654
- August 14, 2008 --- Consumer Product Safety Improvement Act, Pub.L. 110-314
- September 25, 2008 --- ADA Amendments Act of 2008, Pub.L. 110-325

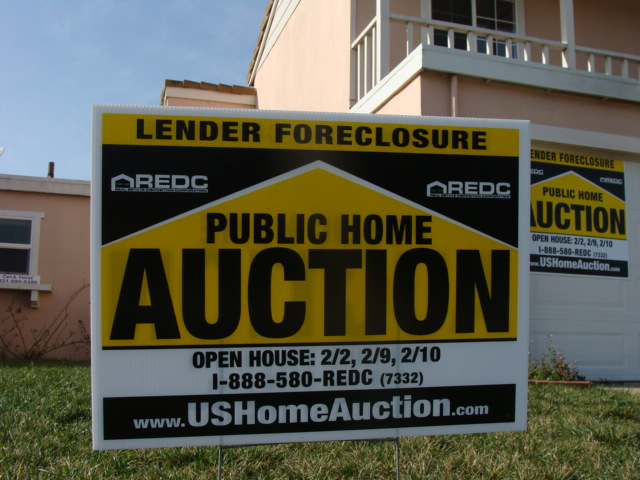
House in Salinas, California under foreclosure, following the bursting of the U.S. real estate bubble.

- October 3, 2008 — Public Law 110-343 (Pub. L. 110–343 (text) (PDF)), 122 Stat. 3765, including:
  - Div. A: Emergency Economic Stabilization Act of 2008, H.R. 1424;
  - Div. B: Energy Improvement and Extension Act of 2008; and
  - Div. C: Tax Extenders and Alternative Minimum Tax Relief Act of 2008
- October 7, 2008 --- Fostering Connections to Success and Increasing Adoptions Act of 2008, Pub.L. 110-351
- October 8. 2008 --- India-United States Civil Nuclear Agreement, Pub.L. 110-369
- October 13, 2008 --- PRO-IP Act, Pub.L. 110-403
- October 13, 2008 --- Drug Trafficking Vessel Interdiction Act of 2008, Pub.L. 110-407
- October 15, 2008 — Pub. L. 110–430 (text) (PDF): Setting the beginning of the first session of the 111th Congress and the date for counting Electoral College votes, 122 Stat. 4846
- October 16, 2008 --- Passenger Rail Investment and Improvement Act of 2008, Pub.L. 110-432
- December 2, 2008 --- Civil Rights Act of 1964 Commemorative Coin Act, Pub.L. 110-451
- December 19, 2008 — Pub. L. 110–455 (text) (PDF): A Saxbe fix, reducing the compensation and other emoluments attached to the office of Secretary of State to that which was in effect on January 1, 2007: allowing Hillary Clinton to serve as Secretary of State despite the Ineligibility Clause of the United States Constitution.
- December 23, 2008 --- America's Beautiful National Parks Quarter Dollar Coin Act of 2008, Pub.L. 110-456
- December 23, 2008 --- Short-term Analog Flash and Emergency Readiness Act, Pub.L. 110-459

More information: Public Laws for the 110th Congress and Complete index of Public and Private Laws for 110th Congress at GPO

=== Proposed, but not enacted ===
in (alphabetical order)

- America's Climate Security Act of 2007
- Auto Industry Financing and Restructuring Act
- Community Broadband Bill
- Community Choice Act
- Comprehensive Immigration Reform Act of 2007
- Deceptive Practices and Voter Intimidation Prevention Act
- District of Columbia House Voting Rights Act of 2007
- Employee Free Choice Act
- Employment Non-Discrimination Act
- Executive Branch Reform Act of 2007
- FAIR USE Act
- Family and Consumer Choice Act of 2007
- Global Warming Pollution Reduction Act of 2007
- Habeas Corpus Restoration Act of 2007
- Homeowner's Defense Act
- IDEA Fairness Restoration Act
- Internet Radio Equality Act
- Iran Sanctions Enhancement Act of 2007
- Iraq War De-Escalation Act of 2007
- Local Law Enforcement Hate Crimes Prevention Act of 2007
- Medicare Prescription Drug Price Negotiation Act of 2007
- New Energy Reform Act of 2008
- No Oil Producing and Exporting Cartels Act
- Patent Reform Act of 2007
- Personal Use of Marijuana by Responsible Adults Act of 2008
- Public Safety Employer-Employee Cooperation Act of 2007
- State Children's Health Insurance Program
- State Secrets Protection Act
- Violent Radicalization and Homegrown Terrorism Prevention Act of 2007

==== Vetoed ====
- Children's Health Insurance Program Reauthorization Act of 2007 (SCHIP, H.R. 976)
- Children's Health Insurance Program Reauthorization Act of 2007 (SCHIP, H.R. 3963)
- Departments of Labor, Health and Human Services, and Education, and Related Agencies Appropriations Act (H.R. 3043)
- Stem Cell Research Enhancement Act of 2007 (S. 5)
- Intelligence Authorization Act for Fiscal Year 2008 (S. 1943)
- H.R. 1585: an earlier version of National Defense Authorization Act for Fiscal Year 2008
- H.R. 1591: an earlier version of U.S. Troop Readiness, Veterans' Care, Katrina Recovery, and Iraq Accountability Appropriations Act, 2007

== Treaties ratified ==
- 110-1: Land-Based Sources Protocol to Cartagena Convention (September 25, 2008)
- 110-2: Singapore Treaty on the Law of Trademarks (December 7, 2007)
- 110-3: Tax Convention with Belgium (December 14, 2007)
- 110-4: International Convention for the Suppression of Acts of Nuclear Terrorism (September 25, 2008)
- 110-6: Amendment to Convention on Physical Protection of Nuclear Material (September 25, 2008)
- 110-8: Protocols of 2005 to the Convention concerning Safety of Maritime Navigation and to the Protocol concerning Safety of Fixed Platforms on the Continental Shelf (September 25, 2008)
- 110-9: Protocol of Amendments to Convention on International Hydrographic Organization (July 21, 2008)
- 110-11: Extradition Treaty with Romania and Protocol to the Treaty on Mutual Legal Assistance in Criminal Matters with Romania (September 23, 2008)
- 110-12: Extradition Treaty with Bulgaria and an Agreement on Certain Aspects of Mutual Legal Assistance in Criminal Matters with Bulgaria (September 23, 2008)
- 110-13: International Convention on Control of Harmful Anti-Fouling Systems on Ships, 2001 (September 26, 2008)
- 110-14: International Convention Against Doping in Sport (July 21, 2008)
- 110-15: Protocol Amending 1980 Tax Convention with Canada (September 23, 2008)
- 110-16: Amendments to the Constitution and Convention of the International Telecommunication Union (Geneva, 1992) (September 25, 2008)
- 110-17: Tax Convention with Iceland (September 23, 2008)
- 110-18: Tax Convention with Bulgaria with Proposed Protocol of Amendment (September 23, 2008)
- 110-20: Protocols to the North Atlantic Treaty of 1949 on Accession of Albania and Croatia (September 25, 2008)

== Select committees ==
- Joint Committee on Inaugural Ceremonies
- House Select Committee on Energy Independence and Global Warming
- House Select Committee on the Voting Irregularities of August 2, 2007

== Hearings ==
- Dismissal of U.S. attorneys controversy hearings - (House and Senate Judiciary Committees)

== Party summary ==
=== Senate ===
Democratic Party: 49 members. Republican Party: 49 members. Independents: 2 members.

Membership changed with one death and two resignations.

Affiliation	Party (Shading indicates majority caucus)			Total	
Affiliation	Democratic	Independent (caucusing with Democrats)	Republican	Total	Vacant
End of previous Congress	44	1	55	100	0
Begin	49	2	49	100	0
June 4, 2007	49	2	48	99	1
June 25, 2007	49	2	49	100	0
December 18, 2007	49	2	48	99	1
December 31, 2007	49	2	49	100	0
November 16, 2008	48	2	49	99	1
Final voting share	50.5%		49.5%		
Beginning of the next Congress	55	2	41	98	2

=== House of Representatives ===
Membership at the beginning of the 110th Congress: Democratic Party: 233 members. Republican Party: 202 members.

Membership fluctuated with seven deaths and eight resignations. Democrats achieved a net gain of three seats as a result of their victories in special elections. See Changes in membership, below.

Affiliation	Party (Shading indicates majority caucus)		Total	
Affiliation	Democratic	Republican	Total	Vacant
End of previous Congress	203 (Note: Including one Independent who caucused with the Democrats)	229	432	3
Begin	233	202	435	0
February 13, 2007	233	201	434	1
April 22, 2007	232	201	433	2
July 1, 2007	231	201	432	3
July 17, 2007	231	202	433	2
August 21, 2007	232	202	434	1
September 5, 2007	232	201	433	2
October 6, 2007	232	200	432	3
October 16, 2007	233	200	433	2
November 26, 2007	233	199	432	3
December 11, 2007	233	201	434	1
December 15, 2007	232	201	433	2
December 31, 2007	232	200	432	3
January 14, 2008	232	199	431	4
February 2, 2008	232	198	430	5
February 11, 2008	231	198	429	6
March 8, 2008	232	198	430	5
March 11, 2008	233	198	431	4
April 8, 2008	234	198	432	3
May 3, 2008	235	199	434	1
May 13, 2008	236	199	435	0
May 31, 2008	235	199	434	1
June 17, 2008	236	199	435	0
August 20, 2008	235	199	434	1
November 18, 2008	236	199	435	0
November 24, 2008	236	198	434	1
January 2, 2009	235	198	433	2
Final voting share	54.3%	45.7%		
Non-voting members	4	1	5	0
Beginning of next Congress	256	178	434	1

== Leadership ==
Section contents: Senate: Majority (D), Minority (R) • House: Majority (D), Minority (R)

=== Senate ===
Senate President

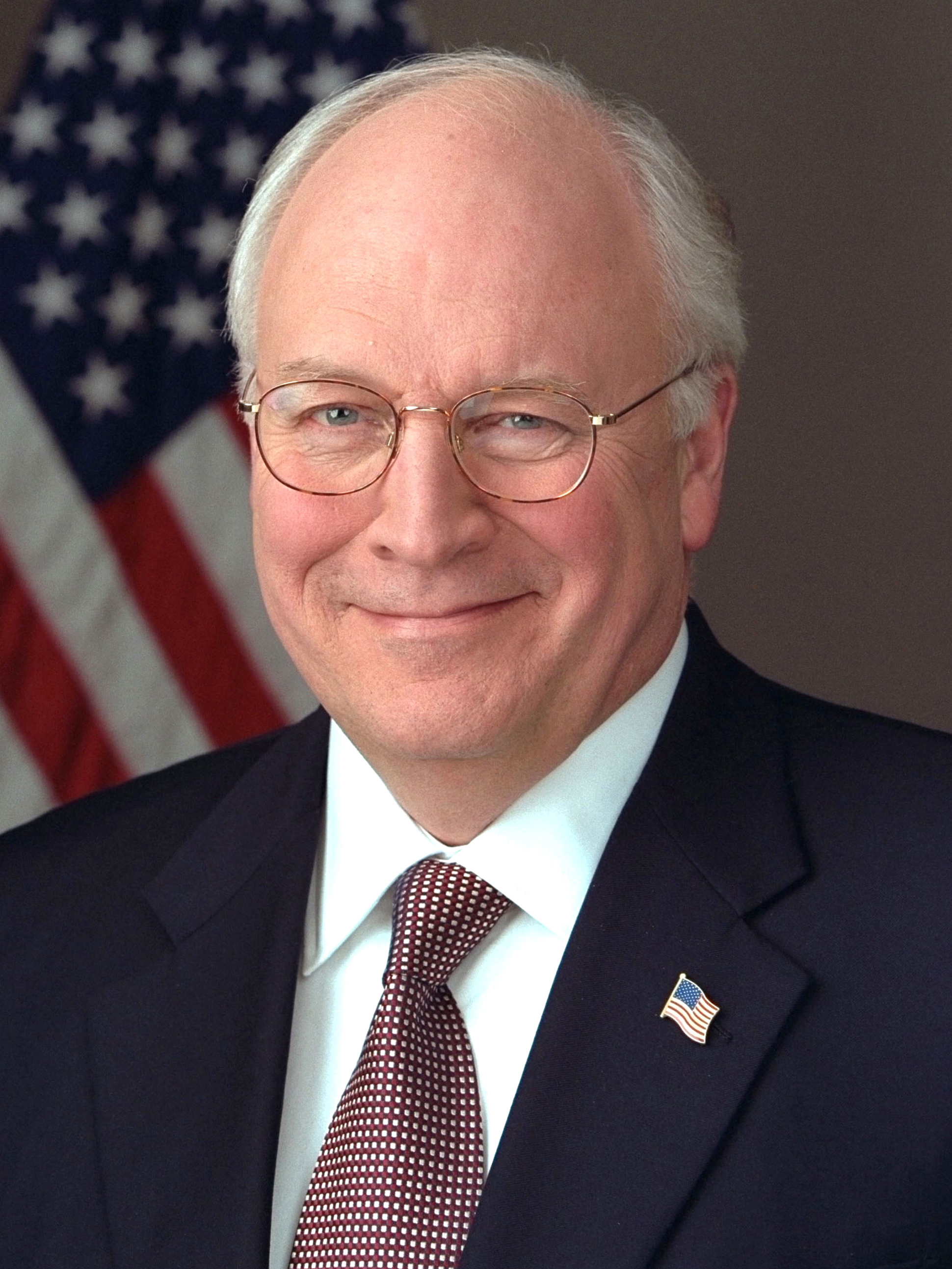
Dick Cheney (R)

Senate President pro tempore

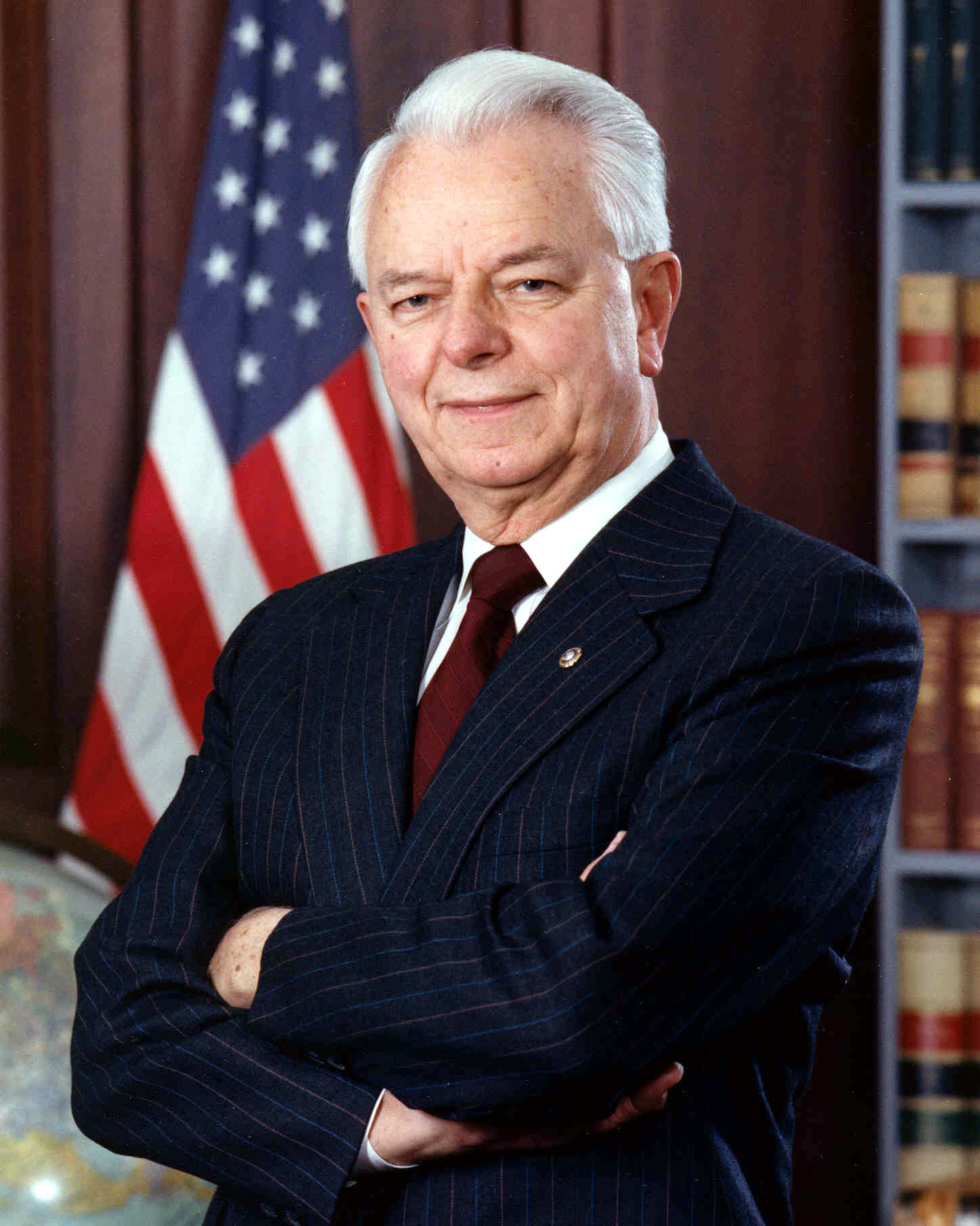
Robert Byrd (D)

- President: Dick Cheney (R)
- President pro tempore: Robert Byrd (D)

==== Majority (Democratic) leadership ====
- Majority Leader and Democratic Conference Chairman: (Note: The Democratic Senate Majority Leader also serves as the Chairman of the Democratic Conference.) Harry Reid
- Assistant Majority Leader (Majority Whip): Dick Durbin
- Democratic Conference Vice Chairman and Democratic Campaign Committee Chairman: Chuck Schumer
- Democratic Conference Secretary: Patty Murray
- Policy Committee Chairman: Byron Dorgan
- Steering and Outreach Committee Chairwoman: Debbie Stabenow
- Committee Outreach Chairman: Jeff Bingaman
- Committee Outreach Vice Chairwoman: Hillary Clinton
- Rural Outreach Chairwoman: Blanche Lincoln
- Chief Deputy Whip: Barbara Boxer
- Deputy Whips: Tom Carper, Bill Nelson, Russ Feingold

==== Minority (Republican) leadership ====
- Minority Leader: Mitch McConnell
- Assistant Minority Leader (Minority Whip): Trent Lott, until December 18, 2007
  - Jon Kyl, from December 18, 2007
- Counselor to the Minority Leader: Bob Bennett
- Republican Conference Chairman: Jon Kyl, until December 18, 2007
  - Lamar Alexander, from December 18, 2007
- Policy Committee Chairman: Kay Bailey Hutchison
- Republican Conference Vice Chairman: John Cornyn
- National Republican Senatorial Committee Chairman: John Ensign
- Chief Deputy Whip: John Thune

=== House of Representatives ===
Speaker of the House

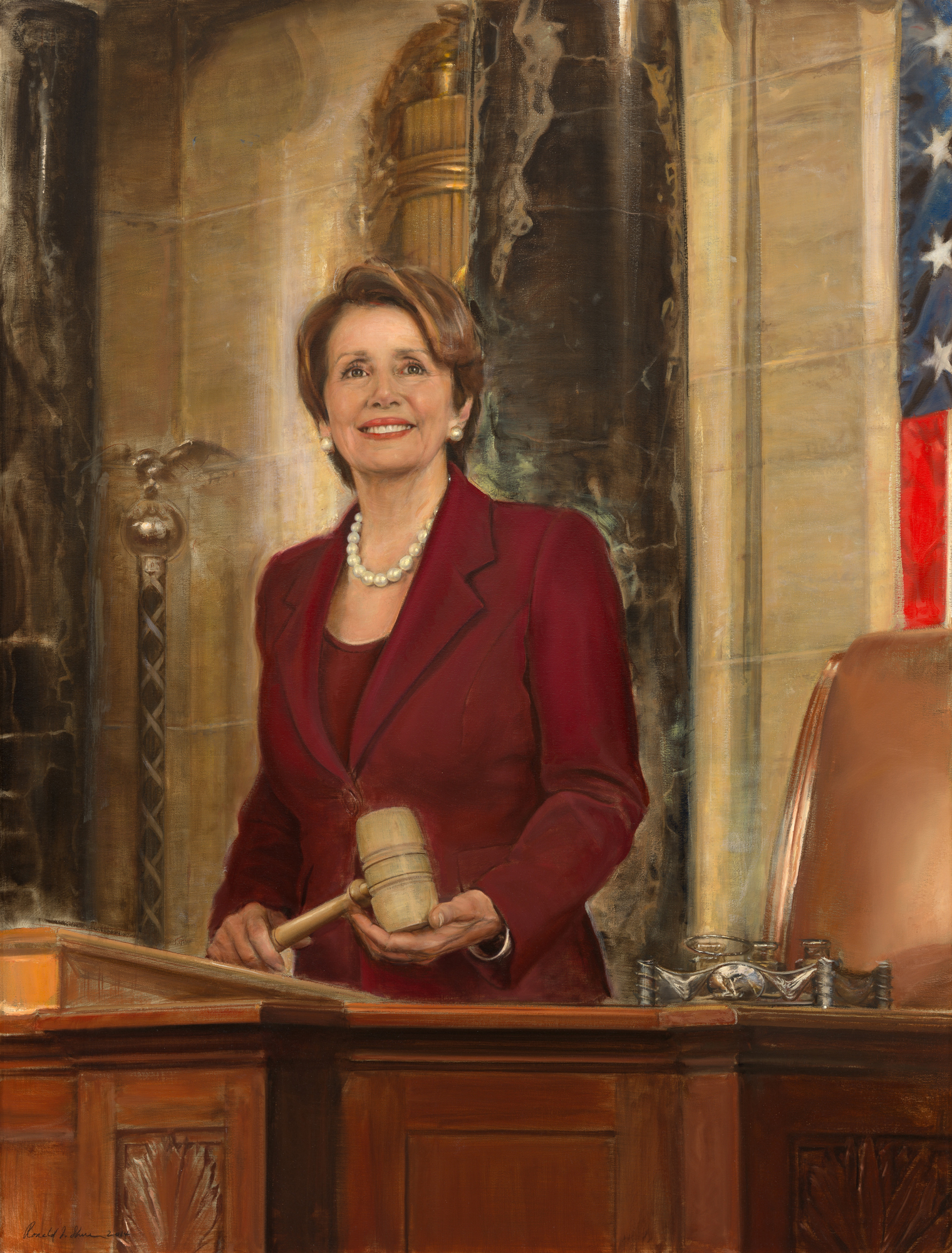
Nancy Pelosi (D)

- Speaker: Nancy Pelosi (D)

==== Majority (Democratic) leadership ====
- Majority Leader: Steny Hoyer
- Majority Whip: Jim Clyburn
- Senior Chief Deputy Majority Whip: John Lewis
- Chief Deputy Majority Whips: Debbie Wasserman Schultz, G. K. Butterfield, Joe Crowley, Diana DeGette, Ed Pastor, Jan Schakowsky, John Tanner, and Maxine Waters
- Democratic Caucus Chairman: Rahm Emanuel
- Democratic Caucus Vice-Chairman: John Larson
- Democratic Campaign Committee Chairman: Chris Van Hollen
- Democratic Steering/Policy Committee Co-Chairs: Rosa DeLauro for Steering and George Miller for Policy

==== Minority (Republican) leadership ====
- Minority Leader: John Boehner
- Minority Whip: Roy Blunt
- Chief Deputy Minority Whip: Eric Cantor
- Republican Conference Chairman: Adam Putnam
- Republican Policy Committee Chairman: Thaddeus McCotter
- Republican Conference Vice-Chair: Kay Granger
- Republican Conference Secretary: John Carter
- Republican Campaign Committee Chairman: Tom Cole
- Ranking Member of the House Rules Committee: David Dreier

== Members ==
Skip to House of Representatives, below

=== Senate ===
Senators are listed by state, then by class, In this Congress, Class 2 meant their term ended with this Congress, requiring reelection in 2008; Class 3 meant their term began in the last Congress, requiring reelection in 2010; and Class 1 meant their term began in this Congress, requiring reelection in 2012.

==== Alabama ====
▌2. Jeff Sessions (R)
▌3. Richard Shelby (R)

==== Alaska ====
▌2. Ted Stevens (R)
▌3. Lisa Murkowski (R)

==== Arizona ====
▌1. Jon Kyl (R)
▌3. John McCain (R)

==== Arkansas ====
▌2. Mark Pryor (D)
▌3. Blanche Lincoln (D)

==== California ====
▌1. Dianne Feinstein (D)
▌3. Barbara Boxer (D)

==== Colorado ====
▌2. Wayne Allard (R)
▌3. Ken Salazar (D)

==== Connecticut ====
▌1. Joe Lieberman (ID)
▌3. Chris Dodd (D)

==== Delaware ====
▌1. Tom Carper (D)
▌2. Joe Biden (D)

==== Florida ====
▌1. Bill Nelson (D)
▌3. Mel Martínez (R)

==== Georgia ====
▌2. Saxby Chambliss (R)
▌3. Johnny Isakson (R)

==== Hawaii ====
▌1. Daniel Akaka (D)
▌3. Daniel Inouye (D)

==== Idaho ====
▌2. Larry Craig (R)
▌3. Mike Crapo (R)

==== Illinois ====
▌2. Dick Durbin (D)
▌3. Barack Obama (D), until November 16, 2008, vacant thereafter

==== Indiana ====
▌1. Richard Lugar (R)
▌3. Evan Bayh (D)

==== Iowa ====
▌2. Tom Harkin (D)
▌3. Chuck Grassley (R)

==== Kansas ====
▌2. Pat Roberts (R)
▌3. Sam Brownback (R)

==== Kentucky ====
▌2. Mitch McConnell (R)
▌3. Jim Bunning (R)

==== Louisiana ====
▌2. Mary Landrieu (D)
▌3. David Vitter (R)

==== Maine ====
▌1. Olympia Snowe (R)
▌2. Susan Collins (R)

==== Maryland ====
▌1. Ben Cardin (D)
▌3. Barbara Mikulski (D)

==== Massachusetts ====
▌1. Ted Kennedy (D)
▌2. John Kerry (D)

==== Michigan ====
▌1. Debbie Stabenow (D)
▌2. Carl Levin (D)

==== Minnesota ====
▌1. Amy Klobuchar (DFL)
▌2. Norm Coleman (R)

==== Mississippi ====
▌1. Trent Lott (R), until December 18, 2007

▌Roger Wicker (R), from December 31, 2007

▌2. Thad Cochran (R)

==== Missouri ====
▌1. Claire McCaskill (D)
▌3. Kit Bond (R)

==== Montana ====
▌1. Jon Tester (D)
▌2. Max Baucus (D)

==== Nebraska ====
▌1. Ben Nelson (D)
▌2. Chuck Hagel (R)

==== Nevada ====
▌1. John Ensign (R)
▌3. Harry Reid (D)

==== New Hampshire ====
▌2. John E. Sununu (R)
▌3. Judd Gregg (R)

==== New Jersey ====
▌1. Bob Menendez (D)
▌2. Frank Lautenberg (D)

==== New Mexico ====
▌1. Jeff Bingaman (D)
▌2. Pete Domenici (R)

==== New York ====
▌1. Hillary Clinton (D)
▌3. Chuck Schumer (D)

==== North Carolina ====
▌2. Elizabeth Dole (R)
▌3. Richard Burr (R)

==== North Dakota ====
▌1. Kent Conrad (D-NPL)
▌3. Byron Dorgan (D-NPL)

==== Ohio ====
▌1. Sherrod Brown (D)
▌3. George Voinovich (R)

==== Oklahoma ====
▌2. Jim Inhofe (R)
▌3. Tom Coburn (R)

==== Oregon ====
▌2. Gordon H. Smith (R)
▌3. Ron Wyden (D)

==== Pennsylvania ====
▌1. Bob Casey Jr. (D)
▌3. Arlen Specter (R)

==== Rhode Island ====
▌1. Sheldon Whitehouse (D)
▌2. Jack Reed (D)

==== South Carolina ====
▌2. Lindsey Graham (R)
▌3. Jim DeMint (R)

==== South Dakota ====
▌2. Tim Johnson (D)
▌3. John Thune (R)

==== Tennessee ====
▌1. Bob Corker (R)
▌2. Lamar Alexander (R)

==== Texas ====
▌1. Kay Bailey Hutchison (R)
▌2. John Cornyn (R)

==== Utah ====
▌1. Orrin Hatch (R)
▌3. Bob Bennett (R)

==== Vermont ====
▌1. Bernie Sanders (I)
▌3. Patrick Leahy (D)

==== Virginia ====
▌1. Jim Webb (D)
▌2. John Warner (R)

==== Washington ====
▌1. Maria Cantwell (D)
▌3. Patty Murray (D)

==== West Virginia ====
▌1. Robert Byrd (D)
▌2. Jay Rockefeller (D)

==== Wisconsin ====
▌1. Herb Kohl (D)
▌3. Russ Feingold (D)

==== Wyoming ====
▌1. Craig Thomas (R), until June 4, 2007

▌John Barrasso (R), from June 22, 2007

▌2. Mike Enzi (R)

Senators' party membership by state at the opening of the 110th Congress in January 2007 2 Democrats 1 Democrat and 1 Republican 2 Republicans 1 Independent and 1 Democrat

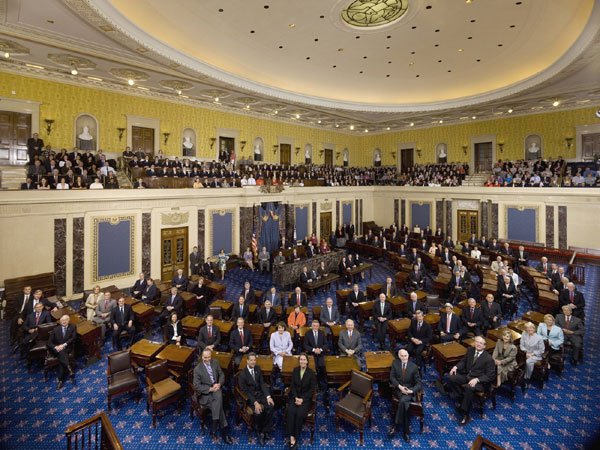
Senators in the 110th Congress

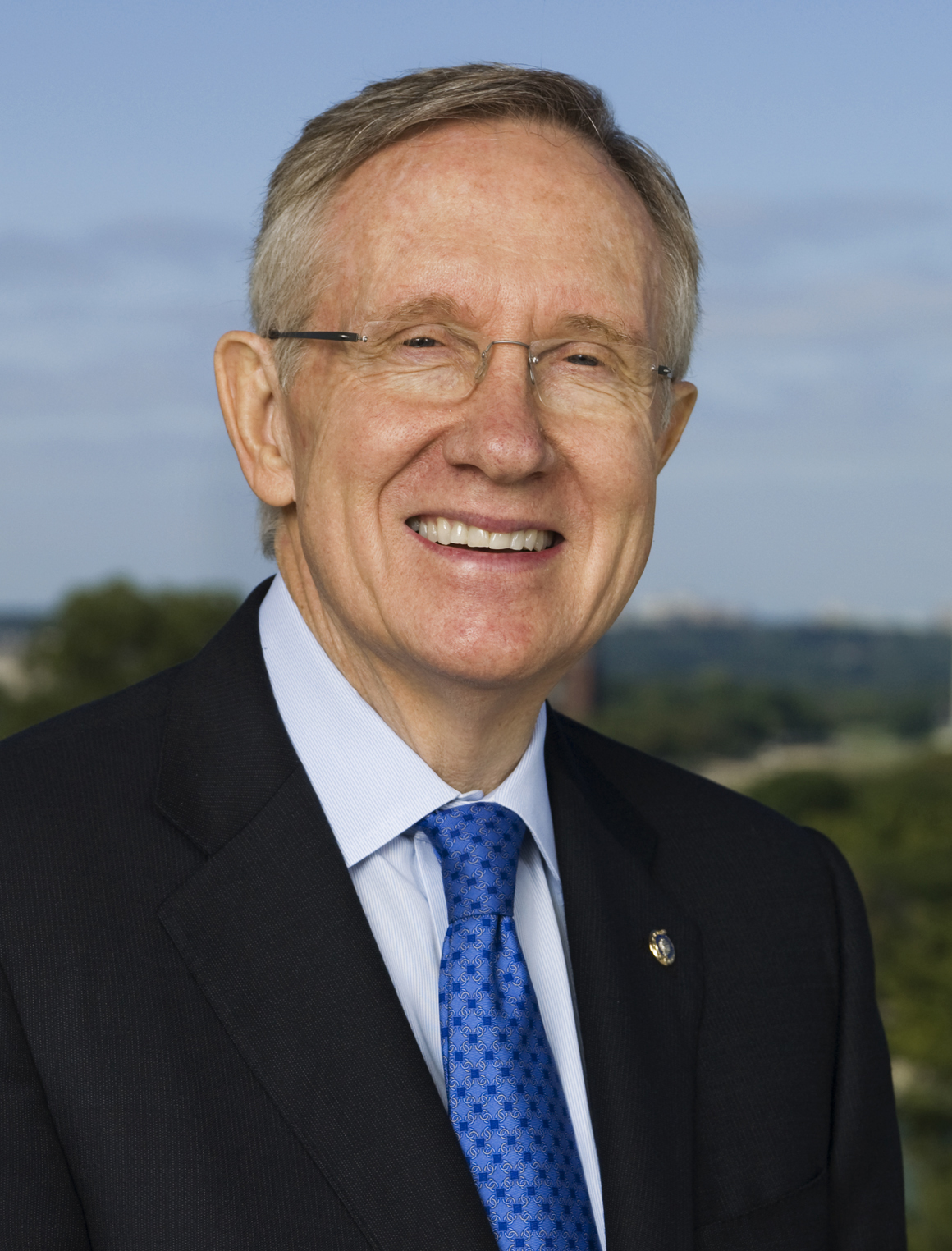
Senate Majority Leader Harry Reid (D)

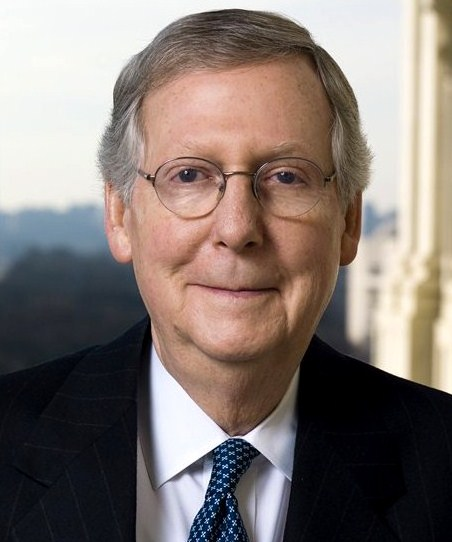
Senate Minority Leader Mitch McConnell (R)

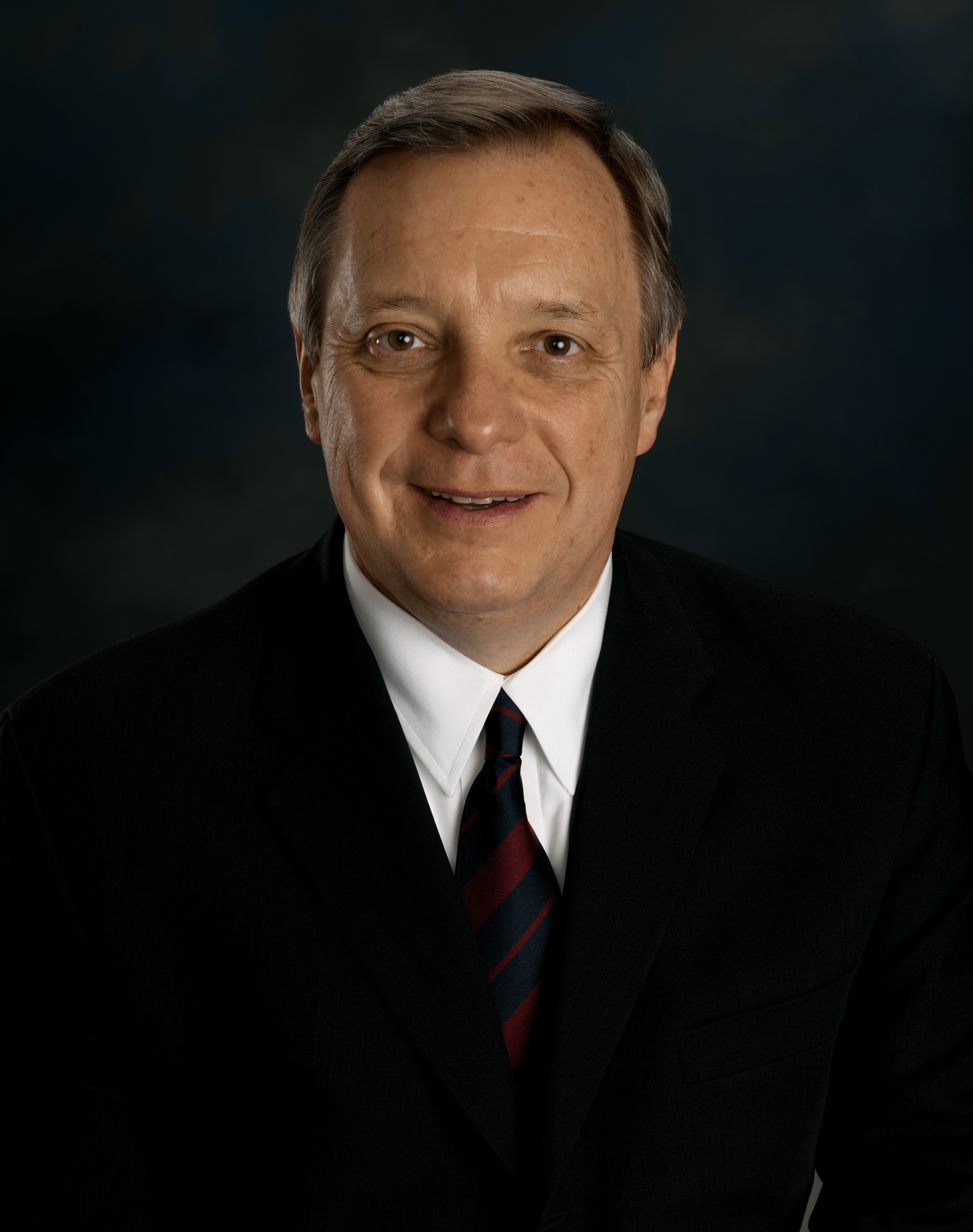
Senate Majority Whip Dick Durbin (D)

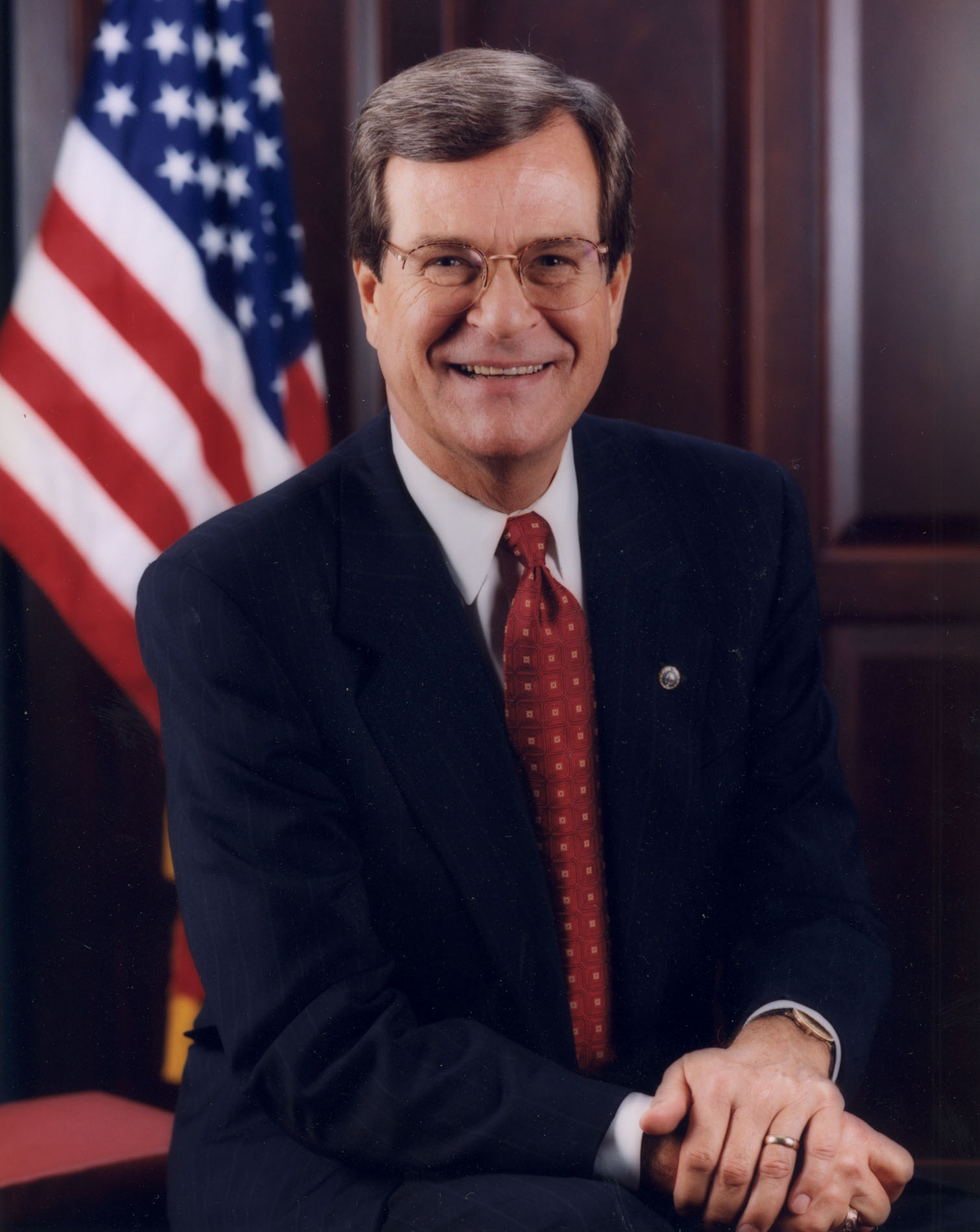
Senate Minority Whip, until December 18, 2007 Trent Lott (R)

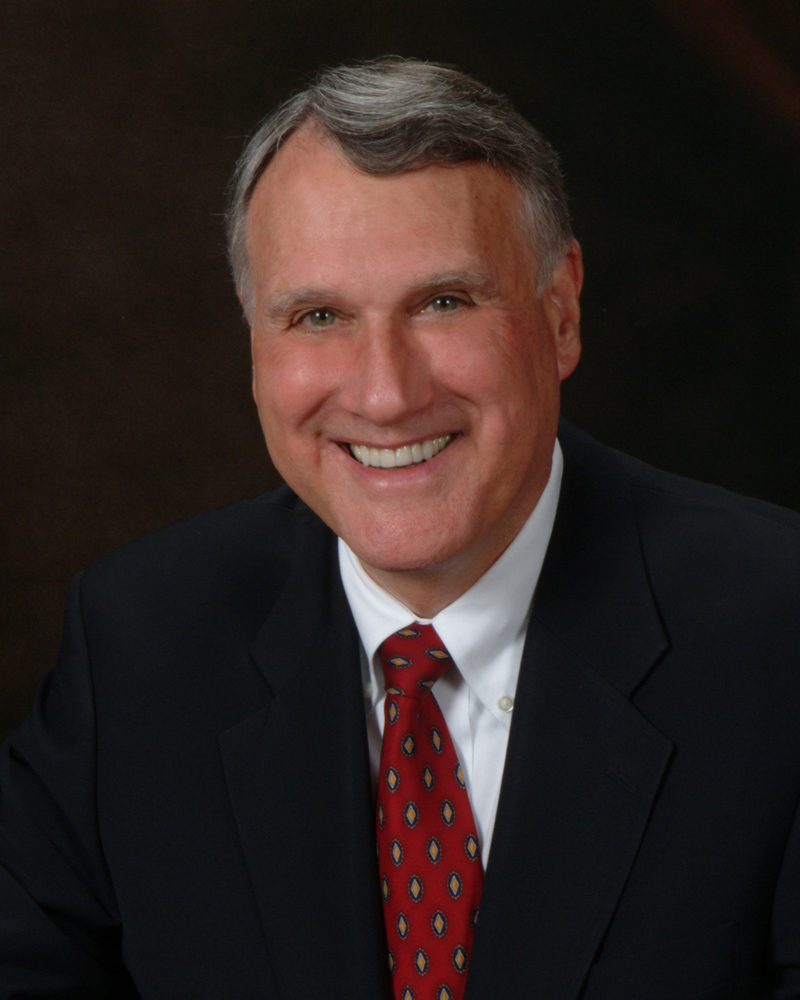
Senate Minority Whip, from December 18, 2007 Jon Kyl (R)

=== House of Representatives ===
==== Alabama ====
▌1. Jo Bonner (R)
▌2. Terry Everett (R)
▌3. Mike D. Rogers (R)
▌4. Robert Aderholt (R)
▌5. Bud Cramer (D)
▌6. Spencer Bachus (R)
▌7. Artur Davis (D)

==== Alaska ====
▌At-large. Don Young (R)

==== Arizona ====
▌1. Rick Renzi (R)
▌2. Trent Franks (R)
▌3. John Shadegg (R)
▌4. Ed Pastor (D)
▌5. Harry Mitchell (D)
▌6. Jeff Flake (R)
▌7. Raúl Grijalva (D)
▌8. Gabby Giffords (D)

==== Arkansas ====
▌1. Marion Berry (D)
▌2. Vic Snyder (D)
▌3. John Boozman (R)
▌4. Mike Ross (D)

==== California ====
▌1. Mike Thompson (D)
▌2. Wally Herger (R)
▌3. Dan Lungren (R)
▌4. John Doolittle (R)
▌5. Doris Matsui (D)
▌6. Lynn Woolsey (D)
▌7. George Miller (D)
▌8. Nancy Pelosi (D)
▌9. Barbara Lee (D)
▌10. Ellen Tauscher (D)
▌11. Jerry McNerney (D)
▌12. Tom Lantos (D), until February 11, 2008

▌Jackie Speier (D), from April 8, 2008

▌13. Pete Stark (D)
▌14. Anna Eshoo (D)
▌15. Mike Honda (D)
▌16. Zoe Lofgren (D)
▌17. Sam Farr (D)
▌18. Dennis Cardoza (D)
▌19. George Radanovich (R)
▌20. Jim Costa (D)
▌21. Devin Nunes (R)
▌22. Kevin McCarthy (R)
▌23. Lois Capps (D)
▌24. Elton Gallegly (R)
▌25. Buck McKeon (R)
▌26. David Dreier (R)
▌27. Brad Sherman (D)
▌28. Howard Berman (D)
▌29. Adam Schiff (D)
▌30. Henry Waxman (D)
▌31. Xavier Becerra (D)
▌32. Hilda Solis (D)
▌33. Diane Watson (D)
▌34. Lucille Roybal-Allard (D)
▌35. Maxine Waters (D)
▌36. Jane Harman (D)
▌37. Juanita Millender-McDonald (D), until April 22, 2007

▌Laura Richardson (D), from August 21, 2007

▌38. Grace Napolitano (D)
▌39. Linda Sánchez (D)
▌40. Ed Royce (R)
▌41. Jerry Lewis (R)
▌42. Gary Miller (R)
▌43. Joe Baca (D)
▌44. Ken Calvert (R)
▌45. Mary Bono Mack (R)
▌46. Dana Rohrabacher (R)
▌47. Loretta Sanchez (D)
▌48. John Campbell (R)
▌49. Darrell Issa (R)
▌50. Brian Bilbray (R)
▌51. Bob Filner (D)
▌52. Duncan L. Hunter (R)
▌53. Susan Davis (D)

==== Colorado ====
▌1. Diana DeGette (D)
▌2. Mark Udall (D)
▌3. John Salazar (D)
▌4. Marilyn Musgrave (R)
▌5. Doug Lamborn (R)
▌6. Tom Tancredo (R)
▌7. Ed Perlmutter (D)

==== Connecticut ====
▌1. John B. Larson (D)
▌2. Joe Courtney (D)
▌3. Rosa DeLauro (D)
▌4. Chris Shays (R)
▌5. Chris Murphy (D)

==== Delaware ====
▌At-large. Mike Castle (R)

==== Florida ====
▌1. Jeff Miller (R)
▌2. Allen Boyd (D)
▌3. Corrine Brown (D)
▌4. Ander Crenshaw (R)
▌5. Ginny Brown-Waite (R)
▌6. Cliff Stearns (R)
▌7. John Mica (R)
▌8. Ric Keller (R)
▌9. Gus Bilirakis (R)
▌10. Bill Young (R)
▌11. Kathy Castor (D)
▌12. Adam Putnam (R)
▌13. Vern Buchanan (R)
▌14. Connie Mack IV (R)
▌15. Dave Weldon (R)
▌16. Tim Mahoney (D)
▌17. Kendrick Meek (D)
▌18. Ileana Ros-Lehtinen (R)
▌19. Robert Wexler (D)
▌20. Debbie Wasserman Schultz (D)
▌21. Lincoln Díaz-Balart (R)
▌22. Ron Klein (D)
▌23. Alcee Hastings (D)
▌24. Tom Feeney (R)
▌25. Mario Díaz-Balart (R)

==== Georgia ====
▌1. Jack Kingston (R)
▌2. Sanford Bishop (D)
▌3. Lynn Westmoreland (R)
▌4. Hank Johnson (D)
▌5. John Lewis (D)
▌6. Tom Price (R)
▌7. John Linder (R)
▌8. Jim Marshall (D)
▌9. Nathan Deal (R)
▌10. Charlie Norwood (R), until February 13, 2007

▌Paul Broun (R), from July 17, 2007

▌11. Phil Gingrey (R)
▌12. John Barrow (D)
▌13. David Scott (D)

==== Hawaii ====
▌1. Neil Abercrombie (D)
▌2. Mazie Hirono (D)

==== Idaho ====
▌1. Bill Sali (R)
▌2. Mike Simpson (R)

==== Illinois ====
▌1. Bobby Rush (D)
▌2. Jesse Jackson Jr. (D)
▌3. Dan Lipinski (D)
▌4. Luis Gutiérrez (D)
▌5. Rahm Emanuel (D), until January 2, 2009, vacant thereafter
▌6. Peter Roskam (R)
▌7. Danny Davis (D)
▌8. Melissa Bean (D)
▌9. Jan Schakowsky (D)
▌10. Mark Kirk (R)
▌11. Jerry Weller (R)
▌12. Jerry Costello (D)
▌13. Judy Biggert (R)
▌14. Dennis Hastert (R), until November 26, 2007

▌Bill Foster (D), from March 8, 2008

▌15. Tim Johnson (R)
▌16. Don Manzullo (R)
▌17. Phil Hare (D)
▌18. Ray LaHood (R)
▌19. John Shimkus (R)

==== Indiana ====
▌1. Pete Visclosky (D)
▌2. Joe Donnelly (D)
▌3. Mark Souder (R)
▌4. Steve Buyer (R)
▌5. Dan Burton (R)
▌6. Mike Pence (R)
▌7. Julia Carson (D), until December 15, 2007

▌André Carson (D), from March 11, 2008

▌8. Brad Ellsworth (D)
▌9. Baron Hill (D)

==== Iowa ====
▌1. Bruce Braley (D)
▌2. Dave Loebsack (D)
▌3. Leonard Boswell (D)
▌4. Tom Latham (R)
▌5. Steve King (R)

==== Kansas ====
▌1. Jerry Moran (R)
▌2. Nancy Boyda (D)
▌3. Dennis Moore (D)
▌4. Todd Tiahrt (R)

==== Kentucky ====
▌1. Ed Whitfield (R)
▌2. Ron Lewis (R)
▌3. John Yarmuth (D)
▌4. Geoff Davis (R)
▌5. Hal Rogers (R)
▌6. Ben Chandler (D)

==== Louisiana ====
▌1. Bobby Jindal (R), until January 14, 2008

▌Steve Scalise (R), from May 3, 2008

▌2. William Jefferson (D)
▌3. Charlie Melançon (D)
▌4. Jim McCrery (R)
▌5. Rodney Alexander (R)
▌6. Richard Baker (R), until February 2, 2008

▌Don Cazayoux (D), from May 3, 2008

▌7. Charles Boustany (R)

==== Maine ====
▌1. Tom Allen (D)
▌2. Mike Michaud (D)

==== Maryland ====
▌1. Wayne Gilchrest (R)
▌2. Dutch Ruppersberger (D)
▌3. John Sarbanes (D)
▌4. Albert Wynn (D), until May 31, 2008

▌Donna Edwards (D), from June 17, 2008

▌5. Steny Hoyer (D)
▌6. Roscoe Bartlett (R)
▌7. Elijah Cummings (D)
▌8. Chris Van Hollen (D)

==== Massachusetts ====
▌1. John Olver (D)
▌2. Richard Neal (D)
▌3. Jim McGovern (D)
▌4. Barney Frank (D)
▌5. Marty Meehan (D), until July 1, 2007

▌Niki Tsongas (D), from October 16, 2007

▌6. John F. Tierney (D)
▌7. Ed Markey (D)
▌8. Mike Capuano (D)
▌9. Stephen Lynch (D)
▌10. Bill Delahunt (D)

==== Michigan ====
▌1. Bart Stupak (D)
▌2. Pete Hoekstra (R)
▌3. Vern Ehlers (R)
▌4. Dave Camp (R)
▌5. Dale Kildee (D)
▌6. Fred Upton (R)
▌7. Tim Walberg (R)
▌8. Mike Rogers (R)
▌9. Joe Knollenberg (R)
▌10. Candice Miller (R)
▌11. Thaddeus McCotter (R)
▌12. Sander Levin (D)
▌13. Carolyn Cheeks Kilpatrick (D)
▌14. John Conyers (D)
▌15. John Dingell (D)

==== Minnesota ====
▌1. Tim Walz (DFL)
▌2. John Kline (R)
▌3. Jim Ramstad (R)
▌4. Betty McCollum (DFL)
▌5. Keith Ellison (DFL)
▌6. Michele Bachmann (R)
▌7. Collin Peterson (DFL)
▌8. Jim Oberstar (DFL)

==== Mississippi ====
▌1. Roger Wicker (R), until December 31, 2007

▌Travis Childers (D), from May 13, 2008

▌2. Bennie Thompson (D)
▌3. Chip Pickering (R)
▌4. Gene Taylor (D)

==== Missouri ====
▌1. Lacy Clay (D)
▌2. Todd Akin (R)
▌3. Russ Carnahan (D)
▌4. Ike Skelton (D)
▌5. Emanuel Cleaver (D)
▌6. Sam Graves (R)
▌7. Roy Blunt (R)
▌8. Jo Ann Emerson (R)
▌9. Kenny Hulshof (R)

==== Montana ====
▌At-large. Denny Rehberg (R)

==== Nebraska ====
▌1. Jeff Fortenberry (R)
▌2. Lee Terry (R)
▌3. Adrian Smith (R)

==== Nevada ====
▌1. Shelley Berkley (D)
▌2. Dean Heller (R)
▌3. Jon Porter (R)

==== New Hampshire ====
▌1. Carol Shea-Porter (D)
▌2. Paul Hodes (D)

==== New Jersey ====
▌1. Rob Andrews (D)
▌2. Frank LoBiondo (R)
▌3. Jim Saxton (R)
▌4. Chris Smith (R)
▌5. Scott Garrett (R)
▌6. Frank Pallone (D)
▌7. Mike Ferguson (R)
▌8. Bill Pascrell (D)
▌9. Steve Rothman (D)
▌10. Donald M. Payne (D)
▌11. Rodney Frelinghuysen (R)
▌12. Rush Holt Jr. (D)
▌13. Albio Sires (D)

==== New Mexico ====
▌1. Heather Wilson (R)
▌2. Steve Pearce (R)
▌3. Tom Udall (D)

==== New York ====
▌1. Tim Bishop (D)
▌2. Steve Israel (D)
▌3. Peter King (R)
▌4. Carolyn McCarthy (D)
▌5. Gary Ackerman (D)
▌6. Gregory Meeks (D)
▌7. Joe Crowley (D)
▌8. Jerry Nadler (D)
▌9. Anthony Weiner (D)
▌10. Edolphus Towns (D)
▌11. Yvette Clarke (D)
▌12. Nydia Velázquez (D)
▌13. Vito Fossella (R)
▌14. Carolyn Maloney (D)
▌15. Charles Rangel (D)
▌16. José E. Serrano (D)
▌17. Eliot Engel (D)
▌18. Nita Lowey (D)
▌19. John Hall (D)
▌20. Kirsten Gillibrand (D)
▌21. Michael McNulty (D)
▌22. Maurice Hinchey (D)
▌23. John M. McHugh (R)
▌24. Mike Arcuri (D)
▌25. James T. Walsh (R)
▌26. Thomas M. Reynolds (R)
▌27. Brian Higgins (D)
▌28. Louise Slaughter (D)
▌29. Randy Kuhl (R)

==== North Carolina ====
▌1. G. K. Butterfield (D)
▌2. Bob Etheridge (D)
▌3. Walter B. Jones Jr. (R)
▌4. David Price (D)
▌5. Virginia Foxx (R)
▌6. Howard Coble (R)
▌7. Mike McIntyre (D)
▌8. Robin Hayes (R)
▌9. Sue Myrick (R)
▌10. Patrick McHenry (R)
▌11. Heath Shuler (D)
▌12. Mel Watt (D)
▌13. Brad Miller (D)

==== North Dakota ====
▌At-large. Earl Pomeroy (D-NPL)

==== Ohio ====
▌1. Steve Chabot (R)
▌2. Jean Schmidt (R)
▌3. Mike Turner (R)
▌4. Jim Jordan (R)
▌5. Paul Gillmor (R), until September 5, 2007

▌Bob Latta (R), from December 11, 2007

▌6. Charlie Wilson (D)
▌7. Dave Hobson (R)
▌8. John Boehner (R)
▌9. Marcy Kaptur (D)
▌10. Dennis Kucinich (D)
▌11. Stephanie Tubbs Jones (D), until August 20, 2008

▌Marcia Fudge (D), from November 18, 2008

▌12. Pat Tiberi (R)
▌13. Betty Sutton (D)
▌14. Steve LaTourette (R)
▌15. Deborah Pryce (R)
▌16. Ralph Regula (R)
▌17. Tim Ryan (D)
▌18. Zack Space (D)

==== Oklahoma ====
▌1. John Sullivan (R)
▌2. Dan Boren (D)
▌3. Frank Lucas (R)
▌4. Tom Cole (R)
▌5. Mary Fallin (R)

==== Oregon ====
▌1. David Wu (D)
▌2. Greg Walden (R)
▌3. Earl Blumenauer (D)
▌4. Peter DeFazio (D)
▌5. Darlene Hooley (D)

==== Pennsylvania ====
▌1. Bob Brady (D)
▌2. Chaka Fattah (D)
▌3. Phil English (R)
▌4. Jason Altmire (D)
▌5. John Peterson (R)
▌6. Jim Gerlach (R)
▌7. Joe Sestak (D)
▌8. Patrick Murphy (D)
▌9. Bill Shuster (R)
▌10. Chris Carney (D)
▌11. Paul Kanjorski (D)
▌12. John Murtha (D)
▌13. Allyson Schwartz (D)
▌14. Mike Doyle (D)
▌15. Charlie Dent (R)
▌16. Joe Pitts (R)
▌17. Tim Holden (D)
▌18. Tim Murphy (R)
▌19. Todd Platts (R)

==== Rhode Island ====
▌1. Patrick J. Kennedy (D)
▌2. James Langevin (D)

==== South Carolina ====
▌1. Henry Brown (R)
▌2. Joe Wilson (R)
▌3. Gresham Barrett (R)
▌4. Bob Inglis (R)
▌5. John Spratt (D)
▌6. Jim Clyburn (D)

==== South Dakota ====
▌At-large. Stephanie Herseth Sandlin (D)

==== Tennessee ====
▌1. David Davis (R)
▌2. Jimmy Duncan (R)
▌3. Zach Wamp (R)
▌4. Lincoln Davis (D)
▌5. Jim Cooper (D)
▌6. Bart Gordon (D)
▌7. Marsha Blackburn (R)
▌8. John Tanner (D)
▌9. Steve Cohen (D)

==== Texas ====
▌1. Louie Gohmert (R)
▌2. Ted Poe (R)
▌3. Sam Johnson (R)
▌4. Ralph Hall (R)
▌5. Jeb Hensarling (R)
▌6. Joe Barton (R)
▌7. John Culberson (R)
▌8. Kevin Brady (R)
▌9. Al Green (D)
▌10. Michael McCaul (R)
▌11. Mike Conaway (R)
▌12. Kay Granger (R)
▌13. Mac Thornberry (R)
▌14. Ron Paul (R)
▌15. Rubén Hinojosa (D)
▌16. Silvestre Reyes (D)
▌17. Chet Edwards (D)
▌18. Sheila Jackson Lee (D)
▌19. Randy Neugebauer (R)
▌20. Charlie Gonzalez (D)
▌21. Lamar Smith (R)
▌22. Nick Lampson (D)
▌23. Ciro Rodriguez (D)
▌24. Kenny Marchant (R)
▌25. Lloyd Doggett (D)
▌26. Michael C. Burgess (R)
▌27. Solomon Ortiz (D)
▌28. Henry Cuellar (D)
▌29. Gene Green (D)
▌30. Eddie Bernice Johnson (D)
▌31. John Carter (R)
▌32. Pete Sessions (R)

==== Utah ====
▌1. Rob Bishop (R)
▌2. Jim Matheson (D)
▌3. Chris Cannon (R)

==== Vermont ====
▌At-large. Peter Welch (D)

==== Virginia ====
▌1. Jo Ann Davis (R), until October 6, 2007

▌Rob Wittman (R), from December 11, 2007

▌2. Thelma Drake (R)
▌3. Bobby Scott (D)
▌4. Randy Forbes (R)
▌5. Virgil Goode (R)
▌6. Bob Goodlatte (R)
▌7. Eric Cantor (R)
▌8. Jim Moran (D)
▌9. Rick Boucher (D)
▌10. Frank Wolf (R)
▌11. Tom Davis (R), until November 24, 2008, vacant thereafter

==== Washington ====
▌1. Jay Inslee (D)
▌2. Rick Larsen (D)
▌3. Brian Baird (D)
▌4. Doc Hastings (R)
▌5. Cathy McMorris Rodgers (R)
▌6. Norm Dicks (D)
▌7. Jim McDermott (D)
▌8. Dave Reichert (R)
▌9. Adam Smith (D)

==== West Virginia ====
▌1. Alan Mollohan (D)
▌2. Shelley Moore Capito (R)
▌3. Nick Rahall (D)

==== Wisconsin ====
▌1. Paul Ryan (R)
▌2. Tammy Baldwin (D)
▌3. Ron Kind (D)
▌4. Gwen Moore (D)
▌5. Jim Sensenbrenner (R)
▌6. Tom Petri (R)
▌7. Dave Obey (D)
▌8. Steve Kagen (D)

==== Wyoming ====
▌At-large. Barbara Cubin (R)

==== Non-voting members ====
▌American Samoa. Eni Faleomavaega (D)
▌District of Columbia. Eleanor Holmes Norton (D)
▌Guam. Madeleine Bordallo (D)
▌Puerto Rico. Luis Fortuño (Resident Commissioner) (R/PNP), until January 2, 2009, vacant thereafter
▌Virgin Islands. Donna Christensen (D)

Initial percentage of members of the House of Representatives from each party by state at the opening of the 110th Congress in January 2007.

House majority leadership

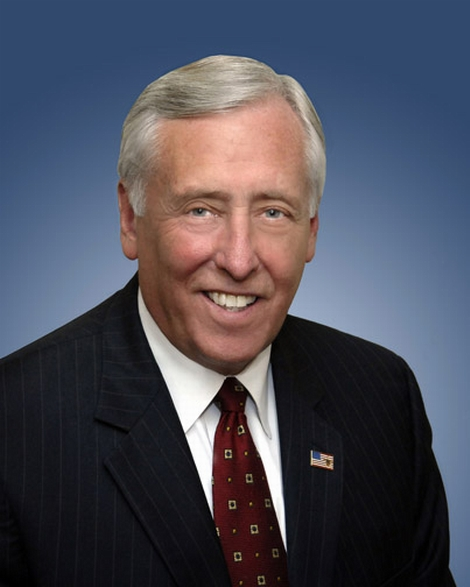
Democratic leader
Steny Hoyer

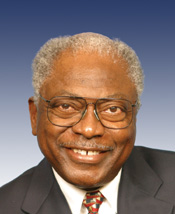
Democratic whip
Jim Clyburn

House minority leadership

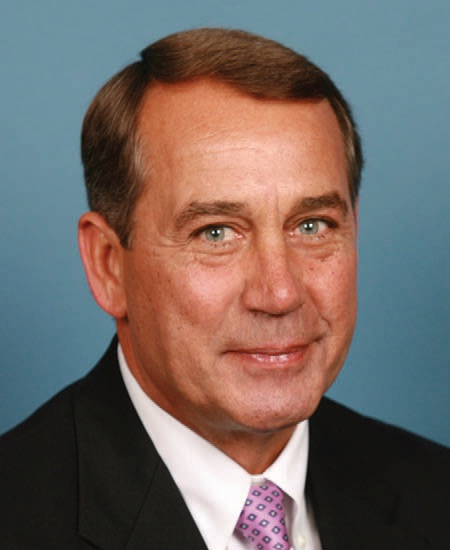
Republican leader
John Boehner

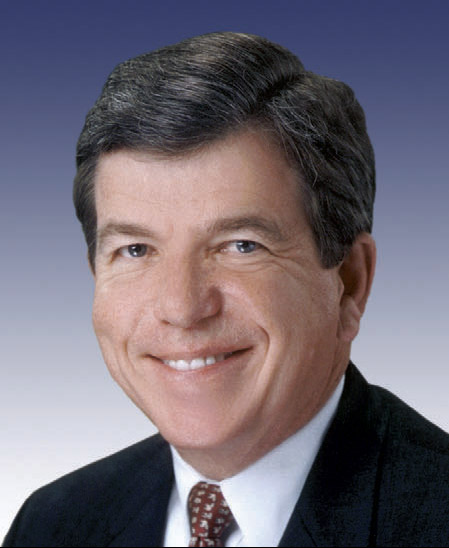
Republican whip
Roy Blunt

== Changes in membership ==
=== Senate ===
There were two resignations and one death.

Senate changes
State (class)	Vacated by	Reason for change	Successor	Date of successor's formal installation (Note: When seated or oath administered, not necessarily when service began.)
Wyoming (1)	Craig Thomas (R)	Died June 4, 2007. Successor appointed June 22, 2007, and then elected to finish the term ending January 3, 2013.	John Barrasso (R)	June 22, 2007
Mississippi (1)	Trent Lott (R)	Resigned December 18, 2007. Successor appointed December 31, 2007, and then elected to finish the term ending January 3, 2013.	Roger Wicker (R)	December 31, 2007
Illinois (3)	Barack Obama (D)	Resigned November 16, 2008, after being elected President of the United States, to focus on his presidential transition as President-elect of the United States.	Vacant until the next Congress.	

=== House of Representatives ===
House changes
District	Vacated by	Reason for change	Successor	Date of successor's formal installation
Georgia 10th	Charlie Norwood (R)	Died February 13, 2007. A special election was held June 19, 2007.	Paul Broun (R)	July 17, 2007
California 37th	Juanita Millender-McDonald (D)	Died April 22, 2007. A special election was held August 21, 2007.	Laura Richardson (D)	August 21, 2007
Massachusetts 5th	Marty Meehan (D)	Resigned July 1, 2007, to become Chancellor of University of Massachusetts Lowell. A special election was held October 16, 2007.	Niki Tsongas (D)	October 16, 2007
Ohio 5th	Paul Gillmor (R)	Died September 5, 2007. A special election was held November 6, 2007.	Bob Latta (R)	December 11, 2007
Virginia 1st	Jo Ann Davis (R)	Died October 6, 2007. A special election was held December 11, 2007.	Rob Wittman (R)	December 11, 2007
Illinois 14th	Dennis Hastert (R)	Resigned November 26, 2007. A special election was held March 8, 2008.	Bill Foster (D)	March 8, 2008
Indiana 7th	Julia Carson (D)	Died December 15, 2007. A special election was held March 11, 2008.	André Carson (D)	March 11, 2008
Mississippi 1st	Roger Wicker (R)	Resigned December 31, 2007, when appointed U.S. Senator. A special election was held May 13, 2008.	Travis Childers (D)	May 13, 2008
Louisiana 1st	Bobby Jindal (R)	Resigned January 14, 2008, to become Governor of Louisiana. A special election was held May 3, 2008.	Steve Scalise (R)	May 3, 2008
Louisiana 6th	Richard Baker (R)	Resigned February 2, 2008, to become President of the Managed Funds Association. A special election was held May 3, 2008.	Don Cazayoux (D)	May 3, 2008
California 12th	Tom Lantos (D)	Died February 11, 2008. A special election was held April 8, 2008.	Jackie Speier (D)	April 8, 2008
Maryland 4th	Albert Wynn (D)	Resigned May 31, 2008, having lost re-nomination. A special election was held June 17, 2008.	Donna Edwards (D)	June 17, 2008
Ohio 11th	Stephanie Tubbs Jones (D)	Died August 20, 2008. A special election was held November 18, 2008.	Marcia Fudge (D)	November 18, 2008
Virginia 11th	Thomas M. Davis (R)	Resigned November 24, 2008, in advance of his retirement. Seat remained vacant for the remainder of this Congress.	None.	
Illinois 5th	Rahm Emanuel (D)	Resigned January 2, 2009, to become White House Chief of Staff. Seat remained vacant for the remainder of this Congress.	None.	
Puerto Rico At-large	Luis Fortuño (R/PNP)	Resigned January 2, 2009, to become Governor of Puerto Rico. Seat remained vacant for the remainder of this Congress.	None.	

== Committees ==
Lists of committees and their party leaders for members of the House and Senate committees can be found through the Official Congressional Directory at the bottom of this article. The directory after the pages of terms of service lists committees of the Senate, House (Standing with Subcommittees, Select and Special) and Joint and, after that, House/Senate committee assignments. On the committees section of the House and Senate in the Official Congressional Directory, the committee's members on the first row on the left side shows the chairman of the committee and on the right side shows the ranking member of the committee.

=== Senate ===
Committee	Chairman	Ranking Member
Aging (special)	Herb Kohl (D-WI)	Gordon Smith (R-OR)
Agriculture, Nutrition and Forestry	Tom Harkin (D-IA)	Saxby Chambliss (R-GA)
Appropriations	Robert Byrd (D-WV)	Thad Cochran (R-MS)
Armed Services	Carl Levin (D-MI)	John McCain (R-AZ)
Banking, Housing and Urban Affairs	Chris Dodd (D-CT)	Richard Shelby (R-AL)
Budget	Kent Conrad (D-ND)	Judd Gregg (R-NH)
Commerce, Science and Transportation	Daniel Inouye (D-HI)	Ted Stevens (R-AK)
Energy and Natural Resources	Jeff Bingaman (D-NM)	Pete Domenici (R-NM)
Environment and Public Works	Barbara Boxer (D-CA)	Jim Inhofe (R-OK)
Ethics (select)	Barbara Boxer (D-CA)	John Cornyn (R-TX)
Finance	Max Baucus (D-MT)	Chuck Grassley (R-IA)
Foreign Relations	Joe Biden (D-DE)	Richard Lugar (R-IN)
Health, Education, Labor and Pensions	Ted Kennedy (D-MA)	Mike Enzi (R-WY)
Homeland Security and Governmental Affairs	Joe Lieberman (I-CT)	Susan Collins (R-ME)
Indian Affairs	Byron Dorgan (D-ND)	Lisa Murkowski (R-AK)
Intelligence (select)	Jay Rockefeller (D-WV)	Kit Bond (R-MO)
Judiciary	Patrick Leahy (D-VT)	Arlen Specter (R-PA)
Rules and Administration	Dianne Feinstein (D-CA)	Bob Bennett (R-UT)
Small Business and Entrepreneurship	John Kerry (D-MA)	Olympia Snowe (R-ME)
Veterans' Affairs	Daniel Akaka (D-HI)	Larry Craig (R-ID)

=== House of Representatives ===
- Agriculture (Collin Peterson, Chair; Bob Goodlatte, Ranking Member)
  - Conservation, Credit, Energy, and Research (Tim Holden, Chair; Frank D. Lucas, Ranking Member)
  - Department Operations, Oversight, Nutrition and Forestry (Joe Baca, Chair; Jo Bonner, Ranking Member)
  - General Farm Commodities and Risk Management (Bob Etheridge, Chair; Jerry Moran, Ranking Member)
  - Horticulture and Organic Agriculture (Dennis Cardoza, Chair; Randy Neugebauer, Ranking Member)
  - Livestock, Dairy, and Poultry (Leonard Boswell, Chair; Robin Hayes, Ranking Member)
  - Specialty Crops, Rural Development and Foreign Agriculture (Mike McIntyre, Chair; Marilyn Musgrave, Ranking Member)
- Appropriations (David R. Obey, Chair; Jerry Lewis, Ranking Member)
  - Agriculture, Rural Development, Food and Drug Administration, and Related Agencies (Rosa DeLauro, Chair; Jack Kingston, Ranking Member)
  - Commerce, Justice, Science, and Related Agencies (Alan Mollohan, Chair; Rodney P. Frelinghuysen, Ranking Member)
  - Defense (John P. Murtha, Chair; C.W. Bill Young, Ranking Member)
  - Energy and Water Development (Chet Edwards, Chair; David Hobson, Ranking Member)
  - Financial Services and General Government (Jose E. Serrano, Chair; Ralph Regula, Ranking Member)
  - Homeland Security (David Price, Chair; Hal Rogers, Ranking Member)
  - Interior, Environment, and Related Agencies (Norman Dicks, Chair; Todd Tiahrt, Ranking Member)
  - Labor, Health and Human Services, Education, and Related Agencies (David R. Obey, Chair; James T. Walsh, Ranking Member)
  - Legislative Branch (Debbie Wasserman Schultz, Chair; Zach Wamp, Ranking Member)
  - Military Construction, Veterans Affairs, and Related Agencies (Chet Edwards, Chair; Roger F. Wicker, Ranking Member)
  - State, Foreign Operations, and Related Programs (Nita Lowey, Chair; Frank Wolf, Ranking Member)
  - Transportation, Housing and Urban Development, and Related Agencies (John W. Olver, Chair; Joe Knollenberg, Ranking Member)
- Armed Services (Ike Skelton, Chair; Duncan L. Hunter, Ranking Member)
  - Readiness (Solomon P. Ortiz, Chair; Jo Ann Davis, Ranking Member)
  - Seapower and Expeditionary Forces (Gene Taylor, Chair; Roscoe G. Bartlett, Ranking Member)
  - Air and Land Forces (Neil Abercrombie, Chair; Jim Saxton, Ranking Member)
  - Oversight and Investigations (Vic Snyder, Chair; John M. McHugh, Ranking Member)
  - Military Personnel (Vic Snyder, Chair; W. Todd Akin, Ranking Member)
  - Terrorism, Unconventional Threats and Capabilities (Adam Smith, Chair; Mac Thornberry, Ranking Member)
  - Strategic Forces (Ellen O. Tauscher, Chair; Terry Everett, Ranking Member)
- Budget (John Spratt, Chair; Paul Ryan, Ranking Member)
- Education and Labor (George Miller, Chair; Buck McKeon, Ranking Member)
  - Early Childhood, Elementary and Secondary Education (Dale Kildee, Chair; Michael Castle, Ranking Member)
  - Healthy Families and Communities (Carolyn McCarthy, Chair; Todd Russell Platts, Ranking Member)
  - Health, Employment, Labor, and Pensions (Robert E. Andrews, Chair; John Kline, Ranking Member)
  - Higher Education, Lifelong Learning, and Competitiveness (Ruben Hinojosa, Chair; Ric Keller, Ranking Member)
  - Workforce Protections (Lynn C. Woolsey, Chair; Joe Wilson, Ranking Member)
- Energy and Commerce (John D. Dingell, Chair; Joe Barton, Ranking Member)
  - Health (Frank Pallone, Chair; Nathan Deal, Ranking Member)
  - Energy and Air Quality (Rick Boucher, Chair; Dennis Hastert, Ranking Member)
  - Commerce, Trade and Consumer Protection (Bobby Rush, Chair; Cliff Stearns, Ranking Member)
  - Telecommunications and the Internet (Edward Markey, Chair; Fred Upton, Ranking Member)
  - Oversight and Investigations (Bart Stupak, Chair; Ed Whitfield, Ranking Member)
- Energy Independence and Global Warming (Select) (Edward Markey, Chair; Jim Sensenbrenner, Ranking Member)
- Financial Services (Barney Frank, Chair; Spencer Bachus, Ranking Member)
  - Domestic and International Monetary Policy, Trade and Technology (Luis V. Gutierrez, Chair; Ron Paul, Ranking Member)
  - Oversight and Investigations (Melvin L. Watt, Chair; Gary G. Miller, Ranking Member)
  - Housing and Community Opportunity (Maxine Waters, Chair; Judy Biggert, Ranking Member)
  - Financial Institutions and Consumer Credit (Carolyn B. Maloney, Chair; Paul E. Gillmor, Ranking Member)
  - Capital Markets, Insurance, and Government-Sponsored Enterprises (Paul E. Kanjorski, Chair; Deborah Pryce, Ranking Member)
- Foreign Affairs (Tom Lantos, Chair until February 11, then Howard Berman; Ileana Ros-Lehtinen, Ranking Member)
  - Africa and Global Health (Donald M. Payne, Chair; Chris Smith, Ranking Member)
  - Asia, the Pacific, and the Global Environment (Eni Faleomavaega, Chair; Donald Manzullo, Ranking Member)
  - Europe (Robert Wexler, Chair; Elton Gallegly, Ranking Member)
  - International Organizations, Human Rights, and Oversight (William Delahunt, Chair; Dana Rohrabacher, Ranking Member)
  - Middle East and South Asia (Gary Ackerman, Chair; Mike Pence, Ranking Member)
  - Terrorism, Nonproliferation, and Trade (Brad Sherman, Chair; Edward Royce, Ranking Member)
  - Western Hemisphere (Eliot Engel, Chair; Dan Burton, Ranking Member)
- Homeland Security (Bennie G. Thompson, Chair; Peter King, Ranking Member)
  - Border, Maritime and Global Counterterrorism (Loretta Sanchez, Chair; Mark Souder, Ranking Member)
  - Emergency Communications, Preparedness, and Response (Henry Cuellar, Chair; Charles Dent, Ranking Member)
  - Emerging Threats, Cybersecurity, and Science and Technology (James R. Langevin, Chair; Michael McCaul, Ranking Member)
  - Intelligence, Information Sharing, and Terrorism Risk Assessment (Jane Harman, Chair; David Reichert, Ranking Member)
  - Management, Investigations, and Oversight (Christopher P. Carney, Chair; Mike D. Rogers, Ranking Member)
  - Transportation Security and Infrastructure Protection (Sheila Jackson-Lee, Chair; Daniel Lungren, Ranking Member)
- House Administration (Bob Brady, Chair; Vern Ehlers, Ranking Member)
  - Capitol Security (Bob Brady, Chair; Daniel Lungren, Ranking Member)
  - Elections (Zoe Lofgren, Chair; Kevin McCarthy, Ranking Member)
- Intelligence (Permanent Select) (Silvestre Reyes, Chair; Pete Hoekstra, Ranking Member)
- Judiciary (John Conyers, Chair; Lamar Smith, Ranking Member)
  - Commercial and Administrative Law (Linda Sanchez, Chair; Chris Cannon, Ranking Member)
  - Constitution, Civil Rights, and Civil Liberties (Jerrold Nadler, Chair; Trent Franks, Ranking Member)
  - Courts, the Internet, and Intellectual Property (Howard Berman, Chair; Howard Coble, Ranking Member)
  - Crime, Terrorism, and Homeland Security (Bobby Scott, Chair; J. Randy Forbes, Ranking Member)
  - Immigration, Citizenship, Refugees, Border Security, and International Law (Zoe Lofgren, Chair; Steve King, Ranking Member)
- Natural Resources (Nick Rahall, Chair; Don Young, Ranking Member)
  - Energy and Mineral Resources (Jim Costa, Chair; Steve Pearce, Ranking Member)
  - Fisheries, Wildlife and Oceans (Madeleine Bordallo, Chair; Henry E. Brown Jr., Ranking Member)
  - Insular Affairs (Donna Christensen, Chair; Luis Fortuno, Ranking Member)
  - National Parks, Forests and Public Lands (Raul Grijalva, Chair; Rob Bishop, Ranking Member)
  - Water and Power (Grace F. Napolitano, Chair; Cathy McMorris Rodgers, Ranking Member)
- Oversight and Government Reform (Henry A. Waxman, Chair; Thomas M. Davis, Ranking Member)
  - Domestic Policy (Dennis Kucinich, Chair; Darrell Issa, Ranking Member)
  - Federal Workforce, Post Office, and District of Columbia (Danny K. Davis, Chair; Kenny Marchant, Ranking Member)
  - Government Management, Organization, and Procurement (Edolphus Towns, Chair; Brian Bilbray, Ranking Member)
  - Information Policy, Census, and National Archives (Lacy Clay, Chair; Mike Turner, Ranking Member)
  - National Security and Foreign Affairs (John F. Tierney, Chair; Christopher Shays, Ranking Member)
- Rules (Louise Slaughter, Chair; David Dreier, Ranking Member)
  - Legislative and Budget Process (Alcee Hastings, Chair; Lincoln Diaz-Balart, Ranking Member)
  - Rules and the Organization of the House (Jim McGovern, Chair; Doc Hastings, Ranking Member)
- Science and Technology (Bart Gordon, Chair; Ralph M. Hall, Ranking Member)
  - Space and Aeronautics (Mark Udall, Chair; Ken Calvert Ranking Member)
  - Technology and Innovation (David Wu, Chair; Phil Gingrey, Ranking Member)
  - Research and Science Education (Brian Baird, Chair; Vernon Ehlers, Ranking Member)
  - Investigations and Oversight (Brad Miller, Chair; Jim Sensenbrenner, Ranking Member)
  - Energy and Environment (Nick Lampson, Chair; Bob Inglis, Ranking Member)
- Small Business (Nydia Velázquez, Chair; Steve Chabot, Ranking Member)
  - Finance and Tax (Melissa Bean, Chair; Dean Heller, Ranking Member)
  - Contracting and Technology (Bruce L. Braley, Chair; Roscoe G. Bartlett, Ranking Member)
  - Rural and Urban Entrepreneurship (Heath Shuler, Chair; Jeff Fortenberry, Ranking Member)
  - Regulations, Healthcare and Trade (Charles A. Gonzalez, Chair; Lynn Westmoreland, Ranking Member)
  - Investigations and Oversight (Jason Altmire, Chair; Louie Gohmert, Ranking Member)
- Standards of Official Conduct (Stephanie Tubbs Jones, Chair; Doc Hastings, Ranking Member)
- Transportation and Infrastructure (James L. Oberstar, Chair; John L. Mica, Ranking Member)
  - Aviation (Jerry F. Costello, Chair; Thomas E. Petri, Ranking Member)
  - Coast Guard and Maritime Transportation (Elijah E. Cummings, Chair; Steven C. LaTourette, Ranking Member)
  - Economic Development, Public Buildings and Emergency Management (Eleanor Holmes Norton, Chair; Sam Graves, Ranking Member)
  - Highways and Transit (Peter DeFazio, Chair; Jimmy Duncan, Ranking Member)
  - Railroads, Pipelines, and Hazardous Materials (Corrine Brown, Chair; Bill Shuster, Ranking Member)
  - Water Resources and Environment (Eddie Bernice Johnson, Chair; Richard Baker, Ranking Member)
- Veterans' Affairs (Bob Filner, Chair; Steve Buyer, Ranking Member)
  - Disability Assistance and Memorial Affairs (John Hall, Chair; Doug Lamborn, Ranking Member)
  - Economic Opportunity (Stephanie Herseth Sandlin, Chair; John Boozman, Ranking Member)
  - Health (Michael Michaud, Chair; Jeff Miller, Ranking Member)
  - Oversight and Investigations (Harry E. Mitchell, Chair; Ginny Brown-Waite, Ranking Member)
- Ways and Means (Charles B. Rangel, Chair; Jim McCrery, Ranking Member)
  - Health (Pete Stark, Chair; Dave Camp, Ranking Member)
  - Social Security (Michael McNulty, Chair; Sam Johnson, Ranking Member)
  - Income Security and Family Support (Jim McDermott, Chair; Jerry Weller, Ranking Member)
  - Trade (Sander M. Levin, Chair; Wally Herger, Ranking Member)
  - Oversight (John Lewis, Chair; Jim Ramstad, Ranking Member)
  - Select Revenue Measures (Richard E. Neal, Chair; Phil English, Ranking Member)
- Whole

=== Joint committees ===
- Economic (Sen. Chuck Schumer, Chair; Rep. Carolyn B. Maloney, Vice Chair)
- The Library (Rep. Dianne Feinstein, Chair; Rep. Bob Brady, Vice Chair)
- Printing (Rep. Bob Brady, Chair; Sen. Dianne Feinstein, Vice Chair)
- Joint Committee on Taxation (Rep. Charles Rangel, Chair; Sen. Max Baucus, Vice Chair)

== Employees ==
Other officers and officials include: (Note: See also: Rules of the House: "Other officers and officials")

=== Legislative branch agency directors ===
- Architect of the Capitol:Alan Hantman, until February 2, 2007
  - Stephen T. Ayers (acting), thereafter
- Attending Physician of the United States Congress: John Eisold
- Comptroller General of the United States: David M. Walker, until 2008
  - Gene Dodaro (acting), from March 13, 2008
- Director of the Congressional Budget Office: Donald B. Marron Jr., until January 18, 2007
  - Peter R. Orszag, January 25, 2007 – November 25, 2008
  - Robert Sunshine (acting), starting November 25, 2008
- Librarian of Congress: James H. Billington
- Public Printer of the United States: Robert Tapella

=== Senate ===
- Chaplain: Barry Black (Seventh-day Adventist)
- Curator: Diane Skvarla
- Historian: Richard A. Baker
- Parliamentarian: Alan Frumin
- Secretary: Nancy Erickson
- Librarian: Greg Harness, until 2008
  - Mary E. Cornaby, starting 2008
- Sergeant at Arms: Terrance Gainer
- Secretary for the Majority: Martin P. Paone, until January 23, 2008
  - Lula J. Davis, elected January 23, 2008
- Secretary for the Minority: David J. Schiappa

=== House of Representatives ===
- Chaplain: Daniel Coughlin (Roman Catholic)
- Chief Administrative Officer: James M. Eagen III (through February 15, 2007)
  - Daniel P. Beard (February 15, 2007 – end)
- Clerk: Karen L. Haas, until February 15, 2007
  - Lorraine Miller, elected February 15, 2007
- Historian: Robert V. Remini
- Parliamentarian: John V. Sullivan
- Reading Clerks: Mary Kevin Niland (D) (until July 2008)/Jaime Zapata (D) (from July 2008), Paul Hays (R) (until April 30, 2007)/Susan Cole (R) (from April 30, 2007)
- Sergeant at Arms: Wilson Livingood
- Inspector General: James J. Cornell

== See also ==
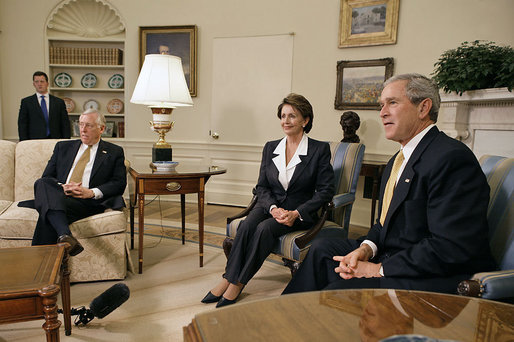
Prospective Speaker Nancy Pelosi and prospective House Majority Leader Steny Hoyer meet with President George W. Bush on November 9, 2006, after the election to this Congress

=== Elections ===
- 2006 United States elections (elections leading to this Congress)
  - 2006 United States Senate elections
  - 2006 United States House of Representatives elections
- 2008 United States elections (elections during this Congress, leading to the next Congress)
  - 2008 United States presidential election
  - 2008 United States Senate elections
  - 2008 United States House of Representatives elections

=== Membership lists ===
- Members of the 110th United States Congress
- List of new members of the 110th United States Congress
