= Community Broadband Bill =

The Community Broadband Act S. 1853 was a bill (proposed law) that was never enacted into legislation by the U.S. Senate, 110th Congress The act was intended to promote affordable broadband access by allowing municipal governments to provide telecommunications capability and services. Supporters of the bill believed it would have encouraged widespread broadband development in the United States by overturning existing state bans on public broadband deployments and eliminating existing barriers to broadband development.

Acquiring municipal broadband for some communities is problematic because the laws of certain states prohibit local municipalities from installing their own broadband networks and private sector companies are unable to provide the electric services needed for broadband. As a result, many rural and remote communities are left with without broadband services. Some municipalities may find broadband service, but it may be limited to already available commercial options, which may fall short of community need.

== Bill ==
Specific provisions of the bill:

- Prevent State governments from enforcing or adopting laws that would prohibit municipalities from providing broadband services
- Encourage the development of public-private partnerships to spread the use of broadband services
- Initiate notice requirements about broadband deployment to ensure the public has adequate information available to evaluate options
- Give private providers the opportunity to provide alternative broadband services
- Ensure public and private providers of broadband services are treated equally with respect to the laws, guidelines and policies that apply to all providers of broadband services

== Economic impact ==
The onset of free or low-cost municipal broadband access to citizens in competition with commercial broadband services would have economic implications.

The Senate Committee on Commerce, Science and Transportation on October 30, 2007 estimated enacting the community broadband bill would have no significant impact on the federal budget. Because the act would preempt laws in 15 states that presently ban the provision of broadband services by public entities, including municipalities, it would, however, impose mandates on some state and local governments. In accordance with the act, public providers would be required to publish notice of their intent to offer broadband services. Public providers would also be required to provide details about the types of broadband services they intend to offer in addition to allowing private bids for those services. Since the preemption laws and private bidding requirements would be considered intergovernmental mandates as defined by the UMRA, the Senate Committee on Commerce, Science and Transportation determined that the cost the mandates could not exceed the threshold established by UMRA and adjusted yearly for inflation. In 2007 the UMRA threshold was $66 million USD.

== Background ==
=== Bush Administration ===
Although broadband access is national problem, it must be addressed on the local level. Acknowledging the importance of broadband in the increasingly competitive global economy, President Bush in June 2004 initiated a goal for universal and affordable broadband access for every American by 2007. However the United States is still far behind in reaching this goal. The Organisation for Economic Co-operation and Development conducted a study ranking the U.S. in 12th place worldwide in the percentage of people with broadband connections. The majority of nations in the top ranks showed to have successfully combined private-public partnerships to provide broadband access for citizens and businesses alike.

=== Proposal ===
On July 27, 2007, Senator Frank Lautenberg introduced the legislation, noting the importance of broadband services and how they are essential to providing important educational and economic opportunities, especially for rural areas. By providing public-private broadband service partnerships, the bill would make it easier for municipalities, cities, and towns across the nation to offer broadband access to their residents.

=== Telecommunications Industry ===
Despite the advocacy for public-private broadband partnerships and service there are many telecommunication firms seeking to bar the enactment of a community broadband act. Citing government-backed networks would compete unfairly with private companies. Also requiring heavy taxpayer subsidization that would minimize net benefits to local residents. Douglas Boone, chief executive of Premier Communications when speaking with U.S. Telecom Association said “setting up a government-owned network is like having city hall opening a chain of grocery stores or gas stations." Government-backed broadband might also lead to stifled innovation inhibiting technological advancement.

There are also telecommunication companies supportive of universal community broadband placements such as Earthlink. Believing partnerships between governments and private companies can provide low-cost, high-speed citywide service that offers many advantages to residents, visitors and taxpayers. EarthLink Municipal Networks, a subsidiary created to design and implement wireless broadband services, with the country's biggest municipal ISP contracts, covering Philadelphia and Anaheim, Calif. The partnership with Earthlink is a prime example of how affordable broadband service is being provided to low-income neighborhoods that would otherwise be passed over by private companies.

== Community Broadband Coalition ==
On September 21, 2007 the Community Broadband Coalition formed by trade associations, public interest organizations, and private companies with an interest to enhance the availability of broadband services throughout the country submitted a congressional letter in support of the bill. The letter urged other senators to cosponsor the bipartisan S. 1853, pointing out the benefits of adopting community broadband networks.

- Increased economic development and jobs enhancing market competition
- Improved and accelerated delivery of e-government services
- Universal, affordable Internet access for all Americans.

Major organizations included in the Community Broadband Coalition letter in support of The Community Broadband Act:

- ACUTA
- American Association of Law Libraries
- American Library Association
- American Public Power Association
- Association of Research Libraries
- EDUCAUSE
- Free Press
- Google
- Intel
- Media Access Project
- National Association of Counties
- National Association of Telecommunications Officers and Advisors (NATOA)
- Tropos Networks
- Utah Telecommunication Open Infrastructure Agency (UTOPIA)
- XO Communications

== Cosponsors ==
United States senators who cosponsored the bill in the 110th United States Congress

- Gordon H. Smith
- John Kerry
- John McCain
- Claire McCaskill
- Olympia Snowe
- Ted Stevens
- Daniel Inouye
- Russell Feingold

== See also ==
- Telecommunications Act of 2005
- municipal broadband
