= Executive Branch Reform Act =

Executive Branch Reform Act may refer to:

- Executive Branch Reform Act of 1986, Oklahoma state law
- Executive Branch Reform Act of 2007, a proposed United States law
