= Community Choice Act =

The Community Choice Act is a proposed United States federal legislative initiative. The act has been advanced by people with disabilities and their allies, as well as Senate and House co-sponsors, to ensure that people eligible for care in a nursing home are also eligible to receive attendant care in their private homes, under a movement known as community-assisted living, or independent living, in which people with disabilities or the elderly live in their own homes with community "supports".

One can find a separate legislative effort in the healthcare reform bill of 2009 in the House commonly confused with the Community Choice Act. The CLASS Act would allow more people with disabilities to receive social security benefits if they paid into it for five years, shorter than a person without disabilities. Critics charge that the legislation does not address the need for personal care services, services which are often needed by people with disabilities. The lack of such services in the community forces many people with disabilities into nursing homes.

== Legislative history ==
Congress	Short title	Bill number(s)	Date introduced	Sponsor(s)	# of cosponsors	Latest status
110th Congress	Community Choice Act of 2007	H.R. 1621	March 21, 2007	Danny K. Davis (D-IL)	125	Died in committee
110th Congress	Community Choice Act of 2007	S. 799	March 7, 2007	Tom Harkin (D-IA)	21	Died in committee
111th Congress	Community Choice Act of 2009	H.R. 1670	March 23, 2009	Danny K. Davis (D-IL)	131	Died in committee
111th Congress	Community Choice Act of 2009	S. 683	March 24, 2009	Tom Harkin (D-IA)	26	Died in committee

== Sources and further reading ==
- S. 799 on THOMAS
- H.R. 1621 on THOMAS
- National Council for Independent Living (page on legislative status as of 2008, reports on cost-effectiveness, and statements by Obama and the AMA)
- ADAPT, another organization behind the legislative effort
