= Iraq War De-Escalation Act of 2007 =

Proposed United States legislation

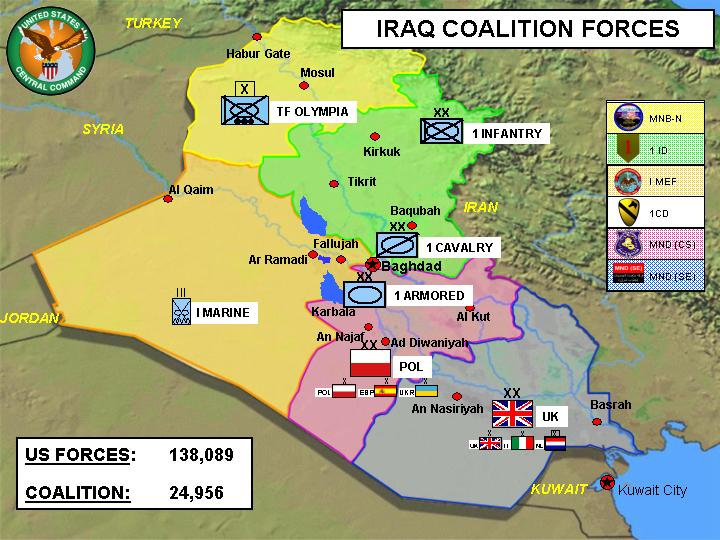
Dispositions of U.S. and allied units in the different occupation zones as of April 30, 2004

On January 30, 2007, then-U.S. Senator Barack Obama introduced the Iraq War De-Escalation Act of 2007 (S. 433). The plan would have stopped the 2007 U.S. Troop Surge of 21,500 in Iraq, and would also have begun a phased redeployment of troops from Iraq with the goal of removing all combat forces by March 31, 2008. The bill was referred to committee and failed to become law in the 110th Congress.

Obama announced the Iraq War De-Escalation Act after President Bush announced an increase in the number of troops fighting in Iraq, and after the State of the Union Address. Obama released a statement saying, "Our troops have performed brilliantly in Iraq, but no amount of American soldiers can solve the political differences at the heart of somebody else's civil war," Obama said, alluding to Michael Scott Doran's essay "Somebody Else's Civil War" published in the Foreign Affairs journal in 2002. "That's why I have introduced a plan to not only stop the escalation of this war, but begin a phased redeployment that can pressure the Iraqis to finally reach a political settlement and reduce the violence."

Barack Obama was critical of President Bush's handling of the war in Iraq, and was an outspoken critic before the war began in 2003. The legislation proposed by Obama is similar to the plan called for in the Iraq Study Group report issued in December 2006.

== Important aspects of the plan ==
- Binding legislation that would not be able to be bypassed without explicit Congressional approval.
- Caps the number of U.S. troops at the January 10, 2007 level.
- Does not affect the funding of the troops.
- Initiates a phased redeployment beginning on May 1, 2007 with a goal of total redeployment of combat forces on March 31, 2008, consistent with the bipartisan Iraq Study Group's Report.
- Enforces benchmarks for Iraq's government including Security, political reconciliation and economic reform. If the benchmarks are met, the redeployment could be temporarily suspended upon congressional approval.
- Maintains a military presence in the region for force protection, training of Iraqi forces, and pursuing international terrorists.
- Requires Congressional oversight with the President reporting a progress report on Iraq to Congress every 90 days.
- Intensifies training of Iraqi security forces to enable Iraqis to take over the security responsibilities for Iraq.
- Puts conditions on economic assistance to the Government of Iraq based on progress towards benchmarks.
- Attempts to create more regional diplomacy with key nations in the region to help achieve a political settlement among the Iraqi people, and prevent a humanitarian catastrophe and regional conflict.

== Criticism ==
Obama's support for the bill and general opposition of the surge pushed forth by David Petraeus garnered him criticism from Republicans and a few pro-war Democrats. Senator John McCain, his opponent in the 2008 Presidential Election, has said that Obama was wrong to oppose the surge, pointing to the decreased levels of the violence that Obama said the surge would raise. Obama's campaign removed the candidate's criticism of the surge from his website however he said that his position on Iraq was unchanged, and he still supported a timetable for withdrawal from Iraq.

== See also ==
- Withdrawal of U.S. troops from Iraq (2007–2011)#Congressional proposals and acts
- Strategic reset
