= Global Warming Pollution Reduction Act of 2007 =

Green industrial policy bill in the 110th Congress introduced by Bernie Sanders

110th United States Congress
- Considered by: 110th United States Congress

Legislative history
- Introduced by: Bernie Sanders (I-VT); Barbara Boxer (D-CA)
- First reading: January 16, 2007

Summary
- Would limit and reduce greenhouse gases emitted by electric generation and motor vehicles
- Status: Not passed

The Global Warming Pollution Reduction Act of 2007 (S. 309) was a bill proposed to amend the 1963 Clean Air Act, a bill that aimed to reduce emissions of carbon dioxide (CO_{2}). U.S. Senator, Bernie Sanders (I-VT), introduced the resolution in the 110th United States Congress on January 16, 2007. The bill was referred to the Senate Committee on Environment and Public Works but was not enacted into law.

The act was intended to increase performance standards for electricity generation and motor vehicles, and included provisions for an optional emissions cap and trade system. This system would have begun in 2010 with the goal of reducing greenhouse gas emissions by 15 percent before 2020 and 83 percent before 2050.

This bill would have provided funding for research and development of carbon sequestration initiatives as well as other projects. It would have also set emissions standards for new vehicles and a renewable fuels requirement for gasoline beginning in 2016, established energy efficiency and renewable portfolio standards beginning in 2008 and low-carbon electricity generation standards beginning in 2016 for electric utilities, and would have required periodic evaluations by the National Academy of Sciences to determine whether emissions targets were adequate.

== Background ==
Senate Bill 309 (S.309) proposed to amend the Clean Air Act of 1970 to include carbon dioxide emissions as a regulated pollutant in the U.S. It established a regulatory framework to nationally regulate carbon dioxide emissions through a set of programs, regulations, and market-based incentives. The Environmental Protection Agency (EPA) would have been directed to implement and enforce the provisions of the bill. Bernie Sanders (I-VT) and Barbara Boxer (D-CA) proposed S. 309 in January 2007, which aimed to incrementally reduce U.S. carbon dioxide emissions from the highest polluting sectors: transportation and electric generation. The bill's goal was to reduce emissions to 80 percent of 1990 levels by 2050.

== Act Overview ==
	Global Warming Pollution Reduction Act
Bill Number	S. 309
Cosponsors	Sens. Bernie Sanders (I-VT), Barbara Boxer (D-CA), Daniel Akaka (D-HI), Russell Feingold (D-WI), Daniel Inouye (D-HI), Edward Kennedy (D-MA), Frank Lautenberg (D-NJ), Patrick Leahy (D-VT), Robert Menendez (D-NJ), Jack Reed (D-RI), Sheldon Whitehouse (D-RI), Joe Biden (D-DE), Ben Cardin (D-MD), Bob Casey (D-PA), Hillary Rodham Clinton (D-NY), Dick Durbin (D-IL), Amy Klobuchar (D-MN), Barbara Mikulski (D-MD), and Barack Obama (D-IL)
Overview	This climate change bill would have been a new title to the Clean Air Act. It would have had the most sweeping effect of any piece of global warming legislation, with multiple programs designed to curb "dangerous interference" with the Earth's climate. It would have set a global goal to keep average temperatures from rising no more than 3.6 °F by stabilizing global concentrations of carbon dioxide at 450 parts per million.
Regulated Industries	Economy-wide, most major sectors of U.S. economy, including power plants and transportation.
Limits	The bill first established broad emission goals, with cuts of 2 percent each year between 2010 and 2020, a 27 percent cut below 1990 levels by 2030, and 53 percent below 1990 levels by 2040. It aimed to cut emissions 80 percent below 1990 levels by 2050. New power plants that would have begun operating after 2012 must have met strict emission limits, equivalent to a natural gas combined-cycle unit. It established a renewable portfolio standard of 5 percent by 2008, 10 percent by 2010, 15 percent by 2015, and 20 percent by 2020. It established a global warming regulation for new automobiles of all sizes equivalent to current standards in California. It also mandated a major increase in renewable content for fuels. Establishes energy efficiency targets.
Auction and allowance allocations	Allocations would have been decided by the U.S. Environmental Protection Agency (EPA), and would have included transition help for consumers and businesses. Cap-and-trade permitted, but there is no requirement.
Offsets	Silent.
Cost control and flexibility	Would have been decided by the U.S. EPA and president.
Extras	The bill would have established new carbon sequestration programs, including grants to demonstrate effectiveness in five regions of the country, and would have placed the U.S. back into international global warming negotiations. It required a report on trade, economic, and technological barriers if the U.S. did not adopt measures to cut its emissions. It also mandated climate change consideration in all federal environmental impact statements. The bill called for new Securities and Exchange Commission rules for reporting on financial exposure from global warming.

== Proposed solution of S. 309 ==
The bill proposes a list of requirements to reduce CO_{2} emission through the following programs:

- Vehicle emissions standards: Changes made by the bill set the emission standard on vehicles so that it cannot exceed more carbon dioxide than it required (205 g/m and 332 g/m for automobiles and 405 g/m for 3 vehicles over 8,501 pounds). This method was proven to be effective enough to reduce carbon dioxide emission even though the cost for the automobile industry can be high.
- Emissions standards for electric generation units: Approximately 52 percent of energy in the United States comes from coal, which is defined as the main source of carbon dioxide emissions. The bill may have also required the development of new technology.
- Low carbon generation requirement: Electricity generators would have been required to produce a specific amount of low carbon energy. These requirements could have been achieved by several techniques: by generating or purchasing low-carbon electric energy, or purchasing credits pursuant to the Low-Carbon Generation Credit Trading Program.
- Renewable portfolio standard: A key benefit of this approach would have been the development of renewable energy technology and a market force for clean energy generation. However, monitoring the standard may have proven difficult, and states that rely more heavily on traditional fossil fuel production could have distorted the market.
- Research and development: The program had three goals: develop an advanced system to monitor global warming pollution, create a baseline reference line for future global warming pollution, and start an international exchange of information to expand measurements. Research is a very important program of this bill, which would have increased the state of knowledge technology of clean energy productions.

== Global warming and Defenders of Wildlife ==
The main concern of scientists and Defenders of Wildlife were global warming issues. The world is threatened by rising sea levels, melting ice, droughts, and distractions of species. As a consequence, the reduction of global warming pollutants was proposed as a solution to the problem, and Senators Bernie Sanders and Barbara Boxer introduced the Global Warming Pollution Reduction Act of 2007. It was designed to implement an emissions reduction strategy that would avoid the most catastrophic consequences of global warming. In particular, the legislation would have mandated an increase in energy efficiency, which would be expected to reduce air pollution and oil consumption while increasing employment in the renewable energy sector. The bill also identified targets for pollution reduction. A focus on those targets was expected to be helpful in maintaining the worldwide average atmospheric temperature below a dangerous "tipping point", beyond which climate change would be unavoidable.

== Current emission standards ==
Emission standards are defined with specific limits to the amount of pollutants that can or cannot be released into the environment. In the U.S., the emission standards are managed by the EPA.

Standards of the average global warming pollution emissions of a vehicle, according to SEC 707 in S309:

- cannot exceed 205 g CO_{2}/mile for vehicles that have a gross weight of at most 8,500 pounds and a loaded weight of at most 3,750 pounds.
- cannot exceed 332 g CO_{2}/mile for vehicles that have a gross weight of at most 8,500 pounds, a loaded weight of at most 3,750 pounds, and medium-duty passenger vehicles.
- cannot exceed 405 g CO_{2}/mile for vehicles that have a gross weight between 8501 pounds and 10000 pounds, and does not also contain a medium duty passenger vehicle.
