= Departments of Labor, Health and Human Services, and Education, and Related Agencies Appropriations Act, 2008 =

The Department of Health and Human Services Appropriations Act of 2008 or the HHS-Labor-Education Appropriations Bill (H.R. 3043) is a bill introduced in the House of Representatives during the 110th United States Congress by Rep. David Obey.

President G.W. Bush vetoed the act because of the cost and because it would ban the use of childhood flu vaccines that contain thimerosal, a mercury-based preservative that has been falsely claimed to cause autism.

== Status ==
The bill passed the House of Representatives and the U. S. Senate. It was vetoed by President Bush on November 13, 2007. The House failed to achieve a two-thirds majority to override the president's veto by two votes on a 277–141 vote.
