= ACUTA =

ACUTA (originally the Association of College and University Telecommunications Administrators, later the Association for Information Communications Technology Professionals in Higher Education) was an international nonprofit association whose core purpose was to support higher education communications technology professionals in contributing to the achievement of the strategic mission of their institutions. It was founded in 1970 by telecommunications managers or directors and disbanded March 22, 2017. The association grew with the evolution of technology to include voice, data and video professionals. The group retained the acronym ACUTA to capitalize on its reputation and recognition that spanned 46 years.

Membership in ACUTA resided with the college and university, and these institutions were represented within the association by the men and women responsible for planning, implementing and maintaining voice and data networks throughout campus. A number of Canadian institutions give ACUTA a presence across North America. Companies that provide products and services relevant to the provision of voice, data and video were also invited to become corporate affiliates. Its membership included more than 700 college and university members, and about 150 corporate affiliates.

The group specialized in educational opportunities and professional networking, offering two seminars and one major conference each year in addition to numerous web seminars. Its website provided immediate access to numerous resources, an active listserv offers useful information as members interact with peers, and the publications program provides a monthly electronic newsletter and a quarterly journal as well as other materials that address issues of relevance and importance. ACUTA also worked closely with a Washington law firm to provide up-to-date information from the U.S. Federal Communications Commission and Congress.

The ACUTA board of directors voted to dissolve on March 22, 2017.
