= Family and Consumer Choice Act of 2007 =

The Family and Consumer Choice Act of 2007 (H.R. 2738 IH) is a proposed bill introduced by United States Representatives Daniel Lipinski (D-IL-3) and Jeff Fortenberry (R-NE-1) intending to allow families to choose and pay for only the cable TV television channels that they want to watch so that it will be easier to prevent their children from cable content they consider indecent. In addition, the bill would impose the same decency standards already in place on broadcast television onto cable channels, as between the hours of 6:00 a.m. and 10:00 p.m. in the Eastern and Pacific time zones (5:00 a.m. to 9:00 p.m. in the Central and Mountain time zones), any indecent type of program, including programs rated "TV-14" or "TV-MA" under the TV Parental Guidelines, may not be broadcast. Lipinski has stated that it will provide parents, who are "the first line of defense in protecting their kids... more help". Currently, all cable television operators in the United States provide their channels in packages without offering packages containing only educational, news, family, or sports channels.

This bill was introduced and referred to the House Committee on Energy and Commerce, which further referred it to the Subcommittee on Telecommunications and the Internet. No actions was taken since then, and the bill was never passed by the House.

== Premise ==
In 2004, following the controversial Super Bowl XXXVIII halftime show where performer Justin Timberlake caused the exposure of co-performer Janet Jackson's breast for two seconds, the conservative media watchdog group Parents Television Council launched campaigns against indecency on television – both broadcast and cable. The Council released in November 2004 a study stating that there was a significant increase sex, profanity, and violence on basic cable television channels, using that study as well as numerous future press releases and reports in their push for à la carte cable offerings. PTC President Tim Winter also wrote an article arguing that cable choice would not only benefit families, but also the general public because cable television subscribers who do not have children would also have the choice not to pay for channels for younger audiences. PTC president L. Brent Bozell III wrote a similar op-ed for USA Today in April 2005.

Some cable providers, including Comcast and Time Warner Cable, have issued "family tiers", cable packages exclusively with family-oriented channels, but the PTC criticized such packages as not catering to the interest of the PTC's constituency, as both "tiers" omitted news and sports channels (such as CNN and ESPN) yet – in the case of Comcast - included such channels that the PTC deemed not "family-friendly", such as TBS for showing reruns of Friends and Sex and the City and USA Network for its reruns of Law & Order: Criminal Intent and Law & Order: Special Victims Unit. Nevertheless, TBS does show programs the PTC has deemed family-friendly or inoffensive, including Major League Baseball coverage, Everybody Loves Raymond, Home Improvement, and The King of Queens, while also broadcasting the PTC-banned programs Dawson's Creek and The Drew Carey Show. In addition, USA Network currently shows PTC-approved programs JAG and Monk. The PTC also criticized Time Warner for many of the same reasons, also claiming that "[a]ccording to Time Warner, classic movies are not appropriate for families. And neither is religious programming", referring to the omission of channels such as Turner Classic Movies and The Word Network from the package. In January 2006, then-PTC president L. Brent Bozell III argued during a United States Senate hearing on indecency that Comcast and Time Warner "have designed these family tiers to fail, because they would like nothing better than for the family tier concept to fail so they could claim after the fact that no demand exists for a different way of doing business in the cable industry." He later went on to claim that "cable channel choice to America's families ... is the only option available that creates a real[ly] free market in the cable industry." In February of that year, the PTC praised a report by the Federal Communications Commission for supporting à la carte cable subscriptions. In July, the PTC met with Congressmen Dan Lipinski and Tom Osborne to support cable choice legislation.

Other supporting organizations for cable choice have included the American Decency Association, American Family Association, Concerned Women for America, Coral Ridge Ministries, Family Research Council, Focus on the Family, and Morality in Media. Additionally, Frederick S. Lane expressed support for cable choice in his 2006 book The Decency Wars: The Campaign to Cleanse American Culture, although expressing doubt that it would make a negative impact on channels that the PTC has deemed offensive, such as MTV and Comedy Central, claiming that those networks would continue to have plentiful viewership while religious channels would decline.

== Public reception ==
On June 14, 2007, United States Representatives Dan Lipinski and Jeff Fortenberry introduced the Family and Consumer Choice Act of 2007. The PTC praised their effort, citing several adult-oriented cable programs soon to be on the air such as the fourth season Rescue Me beginning on FX, The Sopranos airing on A&E Network, and Comedy Central's "Dirty Dozen" block of its hit animated comedy series South Park, where the network would air the most profane, vulgar episodes of the series, including "The Death Camp of Tolerance" and "It Hits the Fan".

PTC Director of Government Affairs Dan Isett, who lobbies the Federal Communications Commission (FCC) on the PTC's behalf, testified that cable choice can still benefit cable programs, citing the series finale of HBO's The Sopranos that was the most-watched show on cable television on the week of its initial broadcast even though HBO was a "premium" cable network available only to subscribers who ordered it in addition to their standard cable packages. Also present during the news conference to celebrate the introduction of the bill were representatives from Concerned Women for America and Consumers Union. Alabama Congressman Robert Aderholt supports this bill.

The part of the bill intending to apply the FCC's broadcast indecency standards to cable television - under the bill, no television station, regardless of broadcast or cable, may air indecent content during the day - has been questioned, given that parental controls including the V-Chip are readily available to most parents. Religious televangelists Jerry Falwell and Pat Robertson have also opposed the concept of cable choice from the very beginning because they felt that viewership for their cable programs would decline.
