= Tom Lantos Block Burmese JADE Act of 2008 =

US act of 2008

The Tom Lantos Block Burmese JADE (Junta's Anti-Democratic Efforts) Act of 2008 (Pub. L. 110–286 (text) (PDF), 122 Stat. 2632, enacted July 29, 2008) is a United States act of Congress, that bars gemstones -- specifically rubies and jadeite -- from Burma from entering the United States via third party countries.

== Provisions ==
As of 2008, gemstones are Burma's third largest source of income.

The bill also bars generals and their associates in Burma from acquiring visas to enter the United States and increases financial sanctions against the Burmese government. The ban does not apply to gems imported for personal use nor to exports of Burmese gems from the U.S or prevent U.S. sales of Burmese gems already in the United States.

== Name ==
The Act was named for Tom Lantos, former chairman of the House Foreign Affairs Committee.
