= Executive Branch Reform Act of 2007 =

The Executive Branch Reform Act (H.R. 984) was a bill proposed in the 110th United States Congress and would have required thousands of federal officials to report into a government database the names of persons who contact them attempting to "influence" government policies or actions.

The prime sponsor of the bill is Congressman Henry A. Waxman, Democrat of California. In the 110th Congress, the bill is designated H.R. 984. It was approved, without dissent, by the Committee on Oversight and Government Reform of the U.S. House of Representatives on February 14, 2007. The legislation has not yet been scheduled for action by the full House of Representatives. According to The Washington Post (March 6, 2007), "A spokesman for House Speaker Nancy Pelosi (D-Calif.) says that she backs the measure . . . and that she expects it to get a vote in the House."

== Requirements of the Bill ==
According as to a letter from the director of the Office of Government Ethics, the bill would require over 8,000 executive branch officials to report into a public database certain details on nearly any "significant contact" from any "private party." The coverage extends to essentially all executive branch appointees of any president of the United States, including any employee serving in a position in level I, II, III, IV, or V of the Executive Schedule; any employee serving in a position of a "policy-determining, policy-making, or policy-advocating character;" and all military officers of one-star rank and above.

The only senior federal officials exempted under the bill are the president, the vice president, and their respective chiefs of staff.

Regarding the requirement to report contacts from any "private party," the bill states, "The term 'private party' means any person or entity, but does not include a Federal, State, or local government official or a person representing such an official." Thus, the bill requires the reporting of contacts from citizens, but does not require the reporting of contacts made by one government official to another.

The bill defines "significant contact" to be any "oral or written communication (including electronic communication) . . . in which the private party seeks to influence official action by any officer or employee of the executive branch of the United States." This definition covers all forms of oral or written communication, one way or two way, whether solicited by the official or not, including letters, faxes, e-mails, phone messages, and petitions.

The covered officials would be required to file quarterly reports listing "the name of each private party who had a significant contact with that official," and "a summary of the nature of the contact, including -- (A) the date of the contact; (B) the subject matter of the contact and the specific executive branch action to which the contact relates; and (C) if the contact was made on behalf of a client, the name of the client." The final provision is apparently meant to cover contacts from persons who are representing the views of others, such as lawyers, representatives of advocacy groups, and paid lobbyists, but the other information must be provided for contacts from every other "private party."

The bill contains certain exceptions, including comments from the public in response to publication of proposed agency rules in the Federal Register, contacts which amount merely to requests for information from a government official or agency, and contacts made by journalists in the course of news gathering.

The bill provides penalties of "administrative sanctions, up to and including termination of employment," for any violation of its requirements. For any deliberate attempt "to conceal a significant contact," there would be an additional penalty of a civil fine of up to $50,000 per infraction.

H.R. 984 also contains unrelated provisions that would place new regulations on so-called "revolving door" practices—that is, government officials moving into private-sector jobs that relate to their previous government employment. These provisions have so far excited far less controversy than the provisions discussed above.

== Support ==
The "Executive Branch Reform Act" is supported by some advocacy organizations as an expansion of "transparency" or "government in the sunshine," but other groups oppose it as an infringing on the constitutionally protected right to petition by making it impermissible for citizens to communicate their views on controversial issues to government officials without those communications becoming a matter of public record.

Among the groups defending the thrust of the bill is Public Citizen, an organization founded by activist Ralph Nader. Craig Holman, legislative representative for Public Citizen's Congress Watch, told the Washington, D.C. newspaper The Hill "that his organization supports the goal of increasing transparency of federal officials' interactions with private interests. Federal officials should have no reason to be 'ashamed' of their contacts with advocates for the issues they work on, he said....Holman conceded, however, that the officials, private parties and communications that would be covered under the bill might be too broad."

== Opposition ==
The position of opponents was initially laid out in a widely circulated memorandum issued by the National Right to Life Committee in February, 2007, which presented a case that such reporting requirements would discourage citizens from communicating their viewpoints to the officials who govern them. The NRLC analysts wrote, "One predictable effect of imposing this isolation on government officials will be to impede countless Americans from exercising their right to petition government officials on policy matters – a right guaranteed by the First Amendment. It would no longer be possible for a private citizen or representative of a group of private citizens to enjoy any degree of privacy when they send a communication on a policy matter to a government official, because the official will be required to report the contact. Once this is generally understood, many citizens will become more reluctant to exercise their constitutional right to petition as freely as they did before. The chilling effect will be especially severe for those Americans who privately advocate for causes disfavored by their own professional peers, social peers, family members, employers, or customers."

The U.S. Department of Justice has raised numerous objections to the bill, both constitutional and practical. In a letter to Congressman Waxman, a senior Justice Department official wrote, "Virtually every person or entity's contact with a Government employee is meant to 'influence' that employee's decision in some way. . . [the] language is extremely broad, requiring covered officials to record and report such communications as questions from the audience at speeches and presentations, calls from listeners on radio and television shows in which covered officials participated, discussions with the public at meetings, receptions, and other public and private events. Hundreds of officials in a department or agency may be covered."

The bill would give the Office of Government Ethics the responsibility of collecting the required reports and enforcing the act. However, the director of that agency sent the bill's author a letter expressing strong reservations about the workability of the legislation.
