= United States House Select Committee on the Voting Irregularities of August 2, 2007 =

Defunct select committee

The House Select Committee on the Voting Irregularities of August 2, 2007 is a defunct select committee of the U.S. House of Representatives. It was established August 3, 2007 when the House adopted resolution H.Res. 611, introduced by House Republican leader John Boehner of Ohio. As a select committee, it operated only during the 110th Congress, and only for the purposes for which it was established.

== Jurisdiction ==
The committee was charged with investigating a vote during House consideration of the fiscal year 2008 appropriations bill for Agriculture, Rural Development, and the Food and Drug Administration. Republicans charged Democrats with improperly changing the result of a vote on the bill, which would have required a provision to explicitly deny federal benefits to illegal immigrants. Toward the end of the vote, several members sought to change their votes, and Democrats gaveled the vote to a close with a vote tally of 214–214, meaning the motion failed. However, because of three Republican vote changes, the final vote showed 215–213, meaning the motion was approved. Several Democratic lawmakers changed their votes, giving a final tally of 212 ayes and 216 noes, killing the motion. Since these vote changes were recorded after the vote had officially ended, the House Majority Leader asked to put the issue to a second vote, which the Republican boycotted stating they had won the first vote, which they charge was prematurely ended and changed after the fact. The motion failed on the second vote.

The six-member panel issued an interim report, as it was tasked to do before September 30, 2007. The committee issued its final report on September 25, 2008, with recommendations on voting rule changes.

== Incident in question ==
The controversy began on August 2, when Republicans were ultimately defeated over a procedural "motion to recommit with instructions" vote on the FY2008 agriculture appropriations bill (H.R. 3161). The motion would have sent the spending bill back to the House Appropriations Committee, requiring the legislation to include provisions barring food stamps for illegal immigrants, before returning to the House floor.

GOP members contested the vote when the presiding chair, Rep. Michael McNulty (D-N.Y.), called the vote in favor of the Democrats prematurely. During the voting, three different vote tallies came up, due to members changing their votes, two having defeated the measure, and one having passed. When McNulty initially gaveled the vote to a close, stating that the motion failed 214–214, the public voting board showed a vote of 215–213, a GOP victory. Democrats then reopened the vote, persuading several colleagues to switch their votes, resulting in a final tally of 212–216, successfully blocking the measure.

After calling for the 215–213 vote to stand, House Republicans eventually marched out of the chamber around 11:00 pm August 2, shouting "SHAME! SHAME! SHAME!" (video here)

House Majority Leader Steny Hoyer (D-Md.) and Minority Leader John Boehner (R-Ohio) attempted to work out an agreement over the proper way to deal with the contested vote, both agreeing to some sort of investigative action. Boehner, however, was apparently persuaded by more conservative members of his party and Minority Whip Roy Blunt (R-Mo.) to seek confrontation through various parliamentary procedures.

The following morning, August 3, Republicans attempted to protest the previous night's vote with the daily routine of verifying the previous day's congressional record, but John Murtha (D-Penn.), as presiding officer, permitted a Democrat request for a recorded vote on the approval procedure. Rep. James Sensenbrenner (R-Wis.) called on Murtha to explain his ruling, and Murtha responded by saying, "It is up to the chair. Let me tell you this, the vote will show that the approval would be approved by the House, as it has been."

Later on the 3rd, the House unanimously passed a Republican-sponsored privileged resolution (H.Res.611) creating a bipartisan Select Committee, with subpoena power, to investigate the August 2 contested vote. Three members would be appointed by the Speaker of the House, and three by the Minority Leader.

The controversy continued, however, when the House voting board, which displays the status and subject of an ongoing vote, blacked out during a vote, leading to continued suspicions and accusations, and delaying the work of the house by almost an hour. Republicans then tried to pass a second privileged resolution (H.Res. 612) which would have rebuked Murtha for not showing the proper degree of respect as Speaker pro tempore to Rep. Sesenbrenner and misusing his power as chair. However, Majority Leader Hoyer sought a motion to table that second resolution. Minority Leader Boehner expressed outrage that the motion to table was brought to a vote without an hour of debate, which should have begun when Hoyer stated "Enough is enough" in response to the GOP resolutions. (video here) Democrats were able to table the resolution, claiming that Hoyer's remarks were not official since the presiding Speaker, Rep. Ellen Tauscher (D-Calif.) had not recognized the Majority Leader. Republican members then shouted "Coverup! Coverup!" as a response to Hoyer's remarks being stricken from the record. The next day, on August 4, Democrats again tabled a resolution (H.Res. 623) offered by Republicans that would have expanded the newly created Select Committee's inquiry to include the August 3 omission of Hoyer's comment.

Eventually the House was able to pass a number of pieces of significant legislation before adjourning for the August recess, however not without much delay resulting from the vote contention and confrontation.

On August 16, 2007, during the August congressional recess, the chairman of the House Administration Committee, Rep. Robert Brady (D-Pa.) met with officials from the House Clerk's office to discuss the House voting board blackout on August 3. Democratic sources claimed that the failure occurred due to a disconnection of the board’s power plug. The newly created select committee to investigate the August 2 voting irregularities was scheduled to release an interim report of its findings to the House, after the recess, by September 30.

A final report was issued on September 25, 2008.

== Members ==
The panel was equally divided between three Democrats and three Republicans. Speaker of the House Nancy Pelosi announced her selections for the committee on September 4, 2007, and House Republican Leader John Boehner announced the Republican members of the committee on September 5, 2007. The select committee was chaired by Bill Delahunt (D) and the Ranking Member was Mike Pence (R).

Majority	Minority
Bill Delahunt, Massachusetts, Chairman; Artur Davis, Alabama; Stephanie Herseth Sandlin, South Dakota	Mike Pence, Indiana, Ranking Member; Steve LaTourette, Ohio; Kenny Hulshof, Missouri
