= Civil Rights Act of 1964 silver dollar =

$1
- United States
- Years of minting: 2014

Obverse

Reverse

The Civil Rights Act of 1964 silver dollar is a commemorative coin issued by the United States Mint in 2014. It was authorized by an act of congress, Pub. L. 110–451 (text) (PDF).
