= Strategic reset =

Policy framework

Strategic reset was a policy framework designed to stop counterproductive U.S. engagement in a fragmenting Iraq and to strengthen the United States' stance throughout the Middle East. In military terms, "reset" refers to "a series of actions to restore units to a desired level of combat capability commensurate with future mission requirements."

The proposal advocates harnessing U.S. military, economic, and diplomatic power to protect critical national security interests rather than expending this power in efforts to accommodate political progress amid multiple internal and external conflicts in Iraq. The plan for strategic reset entails four key measures:

- acknowledging Iraq's political and demographic fragmentation
- implementing prompt phased military redeployment
- establishing local and regional methods for improving security and diplomacy in the Middle East
- developing a functional strategy to resolve the Arab–Israeli conflict.

The framework was set forth in a 2007 report by the Center for American Progress, a progressive think tank based in Washington, D.C.

== Background ==
The Center for American Progress developed the framework for strategic reset on the premise that "with the Iraq War well into its fifth year, the Bush administration still lacks a realistic plan for the Middle East and Iraq." Senior Fellows Brian Katulis and Lawrence J. Korb, together with Peter Juul, laid out the plan in the form of a 64-page report released June 25, 2007.

In 2007, when retired U.S. Marine Corps Gen. John J. Sheehan published a newspaper editorial explaining his decision not to accept the position of "War Czar" or White House implementation manager for the conflicts in Iraq and Afghanistan, he wrote:

- "What I found in discussions with current and former members of this administration is that there is no agreed-upon strategic view of the Iraq problem or the region. ... [A]fter thoughtful discussions with people both in and outside of this administration, I concluded that the current Washington decision-making process lacks a linkage to a broader view of the region and how the parts fit together strategically."

Citing Gen. Sheehan, the report gives examples from what are described as seven years of relative progress in the Middle East (1994–2000) followed by seven years of setbacks (2001–2007), such as:

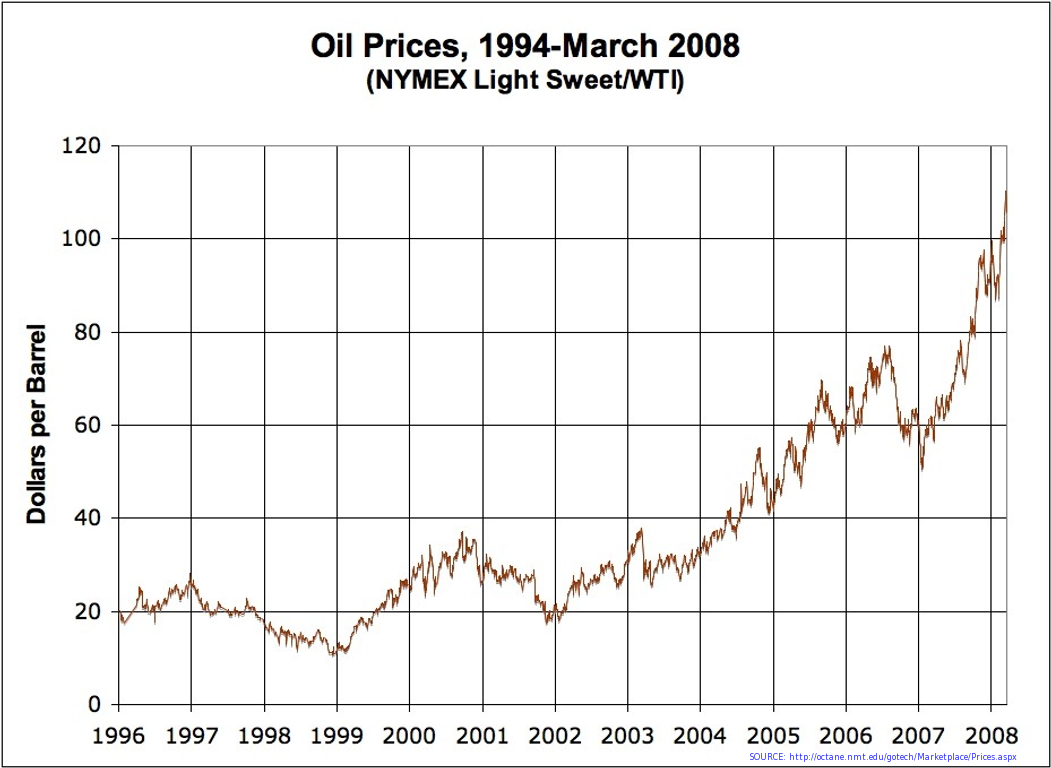

- decline and stall of the Arab–Israeli peace process followed by irruption of war between Israel and Hezbollah
- Late 1990s containment and sanction of Iraq replaced by refugee crises and war
- Iran's new global influence and increased progress on its nuclear program
- Hamas' movement from margin to center of its political stage and victory in the 2006 Palestinian legislative election.
- Direct relation of oil prices to rising levels of violence in the Middle East

U.S. strategy in Iraq in 2007 relied on Iraqi political progress, increased numbers of U.S. troops in the country, and diversification of tactics for political and economic support. While proponents of strategic reset supported diversification, particularly as it regards "situat[ing] the strategy in a regional approach," they strongly oppose sending more U.S. troops to Iraq, and they maintain that the "fundamental premise of Bush's surge strategy—that Iraq's leaders will make key decisions to advance their country's political transition and national reconciliation—is at best misguided and clearly unworkable."

In 2006, the bipartisan Iraq Study Group released a report stressing the need for troop withdrawal and for redoubled diplomatic efforts, including efforts to address the Arab–Israeli conflict. The report also said that the Iraqi government "should accelerate assuming responsibility for Iraqi security," and that the "primary mission of U.S. forces in Iraq should evolve to one of supporting the Iraqi army, which would take over primary responsibility for combat operations." Supporters of the strategic reset framework disagree with the latter terms, claiming that "the ISG was examining an Iraq that simply does not exist anymore," and that embedding U.S. forces to support Iraqi ones "would create unmanageable force protection problems for U.S. troops." Strategic reset emphasizes making counterterrorism the primary role of U.S. troops, rather than engaging them in sectarian conflict. It also emphasizes the necessity of recognizing Iraq's failed national reconciliation and adapting U.S. policy to the inevitable decentralization of Iraqi politics.

In 2007, The Washington Post described as "strategic reset" a proposal by U.S. Secretary of State Condoleezza Rice that took the form of "an unusually detailed public explanation of the new American effort to create a de facto alliance between Israel and moderate Arab states against Iranian extremism."

== Principles of the strategic reset framework ==
Advocates of strategic reset maintain that the current administration's misjudgments regarding Iraq policy have jeopardized the United States' national security interests and that it must act now in order to prevent further attrition of its military and to effectively confront a growing global terrorist threat. The strategy requires that U.S. troops rapidly be withdrawn from Iraq and enlisted in efforts to counter this threat, while available political resources are deployed throughout the Middle East in order to minimize conflict in Iraq and to ensure stability in the region at large. It also requires the U.S. to take action on several fronts, especially the Arab–Israeli conflict, in order to build international support and promote regional commitment to this stability. A further requirement is that the international community cooperate to promote rule of law and to encourage legitimate, non-aggressive governments in the Middle East, preventing the formation of "security vacuums" exploited by Al Qaeda.

=== Adapting to Iraq's fragmentation ===
Since 2005, Iraq's major sectarian conflicts have continued to generate violence at high levels, and Iraq has failed to engineer a political solution to the problems that fuel them. In northern Iraq, Turkmen, Kurds, and Arabs are fighting over the jurisdiction of the Kurdistan Regional Government, and Turkey is conducting raids on the Kurdistan Workers Party. In the south and west, respectively, there is intra-Shi'a violence and violence between Iraqi Sunnis and Sunnis linked to Al-Qaeda; Baghdad and surrounding areas host the deadliest violence in the form of civil war between Sunni and Shi'a. Proponents of strategic reset point out that no significant progress has been made on "benchmarks" established by U.S. Secretary of State Condoleezza Rice such as constitutional reform or laws regulating provincial elections, distribution of oil revenue, or treatment of citizens subject to de-Baathification; they argue that no realistic policy can predicate the resolution of Iraq's sectarian conflicts on the rule of a unified Iraqi governing authority. On June 26, 2007, for example, Iraqi commandos raided the house of Culture Minister Asad Kamal al-Hashimi, who is believed to have ordered an assassination attempt fatal to both sons of Mithal al-Alusi, a member of Iraq's parliament. According to the CAP, "Iraq's leaders fundamentally disagree on what kind of country Iraq is and should be, and Iraq's political transition has not succeeded in bridging these divides. This lack of political consensus among Iraq's leaders has resulted in a violent struggle for power."

==== Stopping unconditional arming of security forces ====
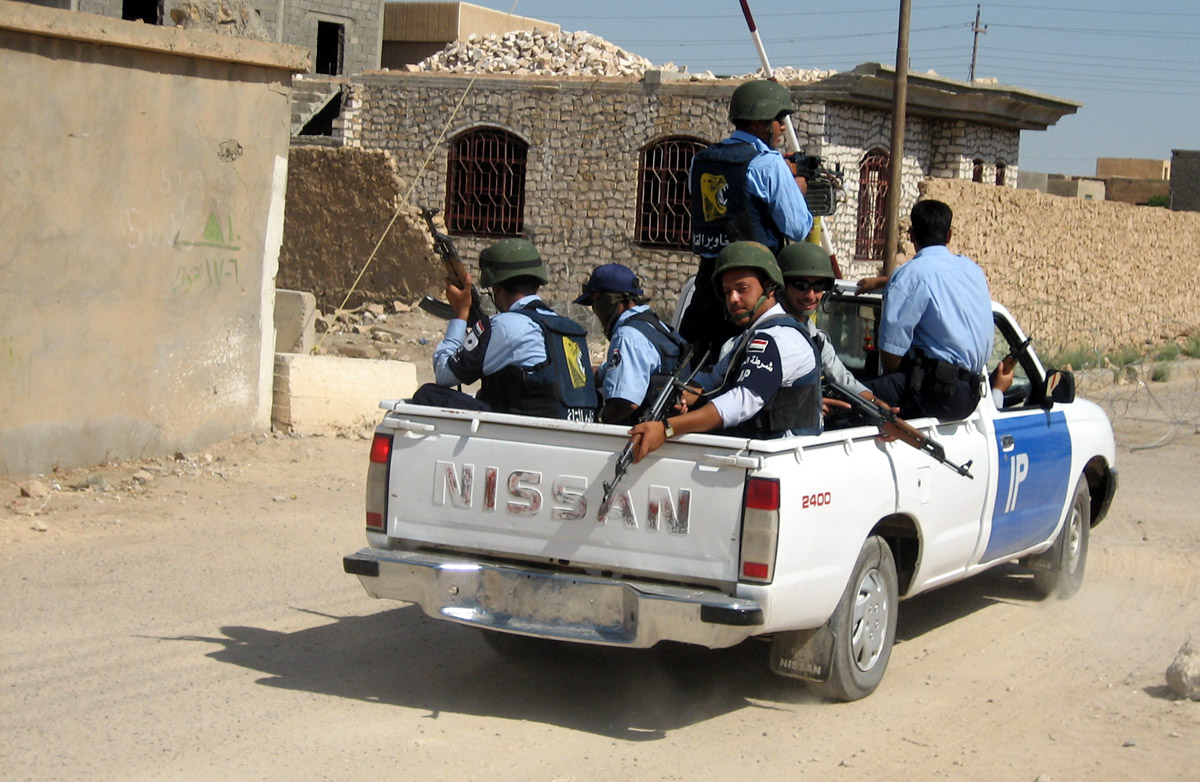
Iraqi police on patrol in Karabilah after an IED was found in a girls school

Under the strategic reset framework, one immediate response to the political stalemate is cessation of the ongoing provision of weapons to Iraqi security forces, whose number now exceeds 500,000. According to the CAP, these security forces—who continue to receive considerable U.S. support—exhibit divided loyalties that stem directly from divisions in the political structure; they have been implicated in corruption, militia membership, death squads, and killing American troops sent to train them. "The fundamental problem with Iraq's security forces is that they lack the allegiance and in many cases the motivation to defend their country. The United States has poured more than $20 billion into building a national army and police force that does not have the unity and support of its own leaders." Supporters of the strategic reset see two dangers in allowing the current policy of arming and training these security forces to continue: the first danger is that the U.S. is providing weaponry to opposing sides of a civil war. For example, Matthew Yglesias, writing for The Atlantic, has said,

- "[T]his business of arming and training Iraqi security forces in the absence of a political solution is not just a waste of time and money, but directly counterproductive. Our weapons and funding are fueling civil conflict in the face of deep political fragmentation and there are absolutely no guarantees as to who these arms will be turned against next year or the year after that."

The second danger arises from the fact that the majority of Iraq's security forces are Shi'a who constitute "some of the closest allies of America's greatest rival in the Middle East—Iran."

==== Decentralization ====
A second response to fragmentation in Iraqi politics is decentralization of U.S. policy and power structure in Iraq. The strategic reset framework calls for reassignment of personnel from the U.S. Embassy in Baghdad into "provincial outposts" established throughout Iraq. It also calls for the U.S. to forgo building a new Baghdad embassy, one projected to be the world's largest. According to the report, the adoption of this pragmatic, localized approach to placing diplomats and intelligence employees would represent progress on three fronts: It would provide bases for intelligence operations to counter terrorism, allow U.S. officials to give consular support to Iraq's estimated 2 million internally displaced persons, and bring U.S. personnel into closer working relationships with local Iraqi institutions.

=== Phased military redeployment ===
Phased redeployment is the strategic reset framework's second mainstay. The plan calls for the U.S. immediately to announce "that it does not intend to maintain permanent military bases or forces in Iraq" and to initiate a new deployment structure allowing forces currently serving in Iraq to rotate home, while incoming troops conduct counterterrorism missions from locations such as Turkey, Afghanistan, and Kuwait. A temporary force of 8,000–10,000 should remain in northern Iraq until 2009, but virtually all other troops are to leave Iraq by September 2008. Redeployment is crucial to the reset strategy chiefly because of its potential to undermine terrorism: proponents argue that U.S. military presence in Iraq gives Al-Qaeda a powerful recruiting tool, as well as ideological justification for continued violence. The most damaging blow the U.S. can deal to such organizations in Iraq, they argue, is to withdraw. Ayman al-Zawahri said on May 5, 2007, that a proposed U.S. redeployment would "deprive us of the opportunity to destroy the American forces which we have caught in a historic trap."

The reset would remove U.S. troops from Iraq while preserving the ability to strike terrorist targets there and elsewhere. The "post-redeployment U.S. force structure in the Middle East would include: an Army brigade and a tactical air squadron stationed in Kuwait; two light, mobile Army brigades stationed in the northern Kurdish areas [of Iraq]; a Marine Expeditionary unit afloat in the Persian Gulf; and four to five Army combat brigades stationed in Afghanistan to complete the unaccomplished mission of eradicating Al Qaeda there.

=== Security and diplomacy ===
The plan combines redeployment with initiatives to promote security and diplomacy in the Middle East. These include:

- Increased efforts to enlist Iraq's neighboring countries in regional progress toward stabilization. The strategy proposes to involve these neighbors by alerting them to the potential local costs of further destabilization; it also suggests that the presence of redeployed U.S. forces will act as a deterrent to those who might otherwise be tempted to exploit Iraq's current weakness.
- Specific measures to prevent escalation of conflict among Kurds, Turkmens, and Arabs near the northern city of Kirkuk. Kirkuk, rich in oil and populated by a Kurdish majority, is the subject of a scheduled referendum that is expected to result in the city becoming part of Iraqi Kurdistan—a prospect frightening to Kirkuk's minorities as well as to its neighbors Turkey and Syria.
- Security initiatives aimed at jihadists returning to find targets for violence in their home countries once the United States has left Iraq. The strategic reset capitalizes on connections forged between intelligence networks and local authorities by increased diplomatic efforts.
- Humanitarian aid to Iraq's refugees. Some 4 million Iraqis have been displaced by the conflict, fleeing either to Egypt, Syria, Jordan and countries in the Persian Gulf region; or to locations mostly within southern and central Iraq. The strategy aims to build international support for these displaced persons. It also suggests that, for moral as well as for political reasons, the U.S. should sharply increase the number of Iraqi refugees it annually accepts, from the current 7,000 up to 100,000.

=== Arab–Israeli conflict ===
Strategic reset requires that U.S. diplomatic efforts to resolve the Arab–Israeli conflict be significantly upgraded. The first major reason for this requirement is that the conflict is considered to have deep destabilizing effects on the entire region; the second is that, since the conflict is seen as a driving force behind anti-American sentiment, enhanced American participation in the peace process would leave the U.S. in a stronger political position regionally. The strategy calls for President Bush to appoint a Middle East envoy and two senior ambassadors as an initial step in this direction. Further key steps would include:

- Strategies to manage crises such as the Fatah–Hamas conflict
- Provision of a diplomatic framework to coordinate regional and international peace proposals
- Diplomatic outreach to Iran and Syria similar to U.S. Cold War diplomatic strategy with China and the Soviet Union
- "Smartly targeted" rule of law support to alleviate security vacuums caused by political instability

== Criticisms ==
David Gooden, writing for the Des Moines Register, has criticized the proposal as "imperial liberalism," claiming that "[F]oreign military occupations are the root cause of Islamic terrorism" and that "[t]he Center for American Progress' plan for a 'strategic reset' will not achieve a lasting or a just peace."

== See also ==
- Reset (military)
- Reverse Course – Shift in United States–Japan relations during the Allied occupation
