= Iraq Study Group Report =

2006 report

- Cover of the printed version of the report
- Author: Co-chair James Baker; Co-chair Lee H. Hamilton; Lawrence S. Eagleburger; Vernon E. Jordan, Jr. Edwin Meese III; Sandra Day O'Connor; Leon Panetta; William J. Perry; Charles S. Robb; Alan K. Simpson
- Language: English
- Subject: Iraq War
- Publisher: United States Institute of Peace
- Publication date: December 6, 2006
- Publication place: United States
- Media type: Paperback, Internet
- Pages: 160
- ISBN: 978-0-307-38656-4
- OCLC: 76937635
- Dewey Decimal: 956.7044/32 22
- LC Class: E902 .I73 2006

The Iraq Study Group Report: The Way Forward – A New Approach is the report of the Iraq Study Group, as mandated by the United States Congress. It is an assessment of the state of the war in Iraq as of December 6, 2006, when the ISG released the report to the public on the Internet and as a published book. The report was seen as crucial by Bush, who declared: "And truth of the matter is, a lot of reports in Washington are never read by anybody. To show you how important this one is, I read it, and [Tony Blair] read it."

According to the Executive Summary of the report, page 16, as quoted, "The Iraqi government should accelerate assuming responsibility for Iraqi security by increasing the number and quality of Iraqi Army brigades. While this process is under way, and to facilitate it, the United States should significantly increase the number of U.S. military personnel, including combat troops, imbedded in and supporting Iraqi Army units. As these actions proceed, U.S. combat forces could begin to move out of Iraq. ... The situation in Iraq is grave and deteriorating." The report recommends that the U.S. should eventually end combat operations in Iraq and help in training Iraqi troops. It does not, however, endorse a complete removal of troops from Iraq by a specific date.

A Portable Document Format version of the Iraq Study Group's final official report was made available on the website of the U. S. Institute of Peace. The Iraq Study Group Report sold 35,000 copies during the week ending 10 December 2006 (its first week of release), according to Nielsen BookScan.

== Scope and task ==
The U.S. government formed the Research Group under the auspices of bipartisanship due to growing concern from officials about hostilities in Iraq and possible civil war. Members of the Study Group and staff spoke with officials from various governments, seeking their views regarding the state of Iraq.

As a matter of political expediency, the group did not assign blame or causality for the state of Iraq's security, by focus on the 2003 invasion of Iraq, the Occupation of Iraq, or subsequent actions taken by the U.S. Military. It researched and outlined problems in Iraq, how such problems relate to each other, and what steps could be taken to fix the problems.

== Pre-release expectations ==
The public expected the ISG to present two overall, alternative policies in their report. The first option, "Redeploy and Contain," would call for the phased withdrawal of U.S. troops to bases near Iraq where they could be redeployed against new threats in the region. Stability First would call for maintaining a presence in Baghdad and encouraging insurgents to enter the political arena, while asking Iran and Syria, Iraq's neighbors, for help ending the fighting.

According to The New York Times, the report would call for a gradual pullback of American forces from Iraq beginning in 2007.

The now defunct New York Sun reported that an expert adviser to the Iraq Study Group expected the panel to recommend that the Bush administration pressure Israel to make concessions so as to entice Syria and Iran to a regional conference on Iraq.

== Contents ==
The final report has 79 separate policy recommendations in its 160 pages. Its central points had for the most part been reported on before its release. The report deals with domestic issues such as budget funding and economic processes, military issues including bringing U.S. troops out of Iraq and how to integrate more of them into Iraqi army units, the foreign political issues of nurturing an effective and unified Iraqi government, and diplomatic issues such as calling for direct talks with Iran and Syria.

The report begins by laying out the difficulties surrounding the Iraq war and the current U.S. position. It warns that its policy recommendations are not failsafe, but that the deteriorating situation in Iraq could lead to political and humanitarian consequences if not dealt with immediately.

=== Military concerns ===
The report contains many recommendations concerning the continued usage of military forces to achieve the goals of the United States. Only five pages of the report address U.S. troop levels, however: "More than 30 pages of the report consist of biographies of commission members and lists of people they interviewed; we counted just five pages devoted to the matter of U.S. troop levels in Iraq. ..." Increasing those levels was not considered in depth as it was not considered a viable option. Panel members say they were not given a mandate to consider increasing the number of American troops in Iraq because their military briefers dismissed out of hand the premise that it was possible to increase the number of American troops in Iraq, on grounds that not enough were available. The report recommends instead envisaging the removal of all U.S. troops from Iraq by 2008.

In the section in which the report assesses "the Current Situation in Iraq," in considering "Security" (Section A.1.), it states:

Attacks against U.S., Coalition, and Iraqi security forces are persistent and growing. October 2006 was the deadliest month for U.S. forces since January 2005, with 102 Americans killed. Total attacks in October 2006 averaged 180 per day, up from 70 per day in January 2006. Daily attacks against Iraqi security forces in October were more than double the level in January. Attacks against civilians in October were four times higher than in January. Some 3,000 Iraqi civilians are killed every month. (3)

In the same chapter, discussing "U.S., Coalition, and Iraqi Forces," the report suggests several causes for these consequences, chiefly the difficulties facing "the Multi-National Forces–Iraq under U.S. command, working in concert with Iraq's security forces," in "confronting this violence." In its subsection on the "Iraqi Forces," the report observes that while "The Iraqi Army is making fitful progress toward becoming a reliable and disciplined fighting force loyal to the national government," some "significant questions remain about the ethnic composition and loyalties of some Iraqi units—specifically, whether they will carry out missions on behalf of national goals instead of a sectarian agenda" (8), detailing these problems (8–9). The Report observes, for example, a significant gap in funding for the Iraq defense forces: "The entire appropriation for Iraqi defense forces for FY 2006 ($3 billion) is less than the United States currently spends in Iraq every two weeks" (9). It observes that the Iraqi Army "is also confronted by several other challenges": the "units" of the Iraqi Army lack adequate "leadership," "equipment," "personnel," "logistics and support," including "the ability to sustain their operations," "the capability to transport supplies and troops and the capacity to provide their own indirect fire support, technical intelligence, and medical evacuation." The Iraq Study Group predicts that the Iraqi Army "will depend on the United States for logistics and support through at least 2007."

=== Diplomatic concerns ===
The report also presents the "goals of the diplomatic offensive as it relates to the regional players":

Recommendation 2: The goals of the diplomatic offensive as it relates to regional players should be to:

1. Support the unity and territorial integrity of Iraq.
2. Stop destabilizing interventions and actions by Iraq's neighbors.
3. Secure Iraq's borders, including the use of joint patrols with neighboring countries.
4. Prevent the expansion of the instability and conflict beyond Iraq's borders.
5. Promote economic assistance, commerce, trade, political support, and, if possible, military assistance for the Iraqi government from non-neighboring Muslim nations.
6. Energize countries to support national political reconciliation in Iraq.
7. Validate Iraq's legitimacy by resuming diplomatic relations, where appropriate, and reestablishing embassies in Baghdad.
8. Assist Iraq in establishing active working embassies in key capitals in the region (for example, in Riyadh, Saudi Arabia).
9. Help Iraq reach a mutually acceptable agreement on Kirkuk.
10. Assist the Iraqi government in achieving certain security, political, and economic milestones, including better performance on issues such as national reconciliation, equitable distribution of oil revenues, and the dismantling of militias.

In this report, however, the goals of the United States take precedence over the interests of the population of Iraq:

Recommendation 41: The United States must make it clear to the Iraqi government that the United States could carry out its plans, including planned redeployments, even if Iraq does not implement its planned changes. America's other security needs and the future of our military cannot be made hostage to the actions or inactions of the Iraqi government.

=== Economic concerns ===
The report focuses heavily on the oil industry in Iraq.

For example, according to Recommendation 62 in part:

As soon as possible, the U.S. government should provided technical assistance to the Iraqi government to prepare a draft oil law that defines the rights of regional and local governments and creates a fiscal and legal framework for investment. help draft an oil law that creates a fiscal and legal framework for investment.

In conjunction with the International Monetary Fund, the U.S. government should press Iraq to continue reducing subsidies in the energy sector, instead of providing grant assistance. Until Iraqis pay market prices for oil products, drastic fuel shortages will remain.

Recommendation 63 says in part that

The United States should encourage investment in Iraq's oil sector by the international community and by international energy companies.

The United states should assist Iraqi leaders to reorganize the national oil industry as a commercial enterprise, in order to enhance efficiency, transparency, and accountability.

Their report also notes that corruption may be more responsible for breakdowns in the oil sector than the insurgency itself:

Corruption is also debilitating. Experts estimate that 150,000 to 200,000—and perhaps as many as 500,000—barrels of oil per day are being stolen.

=== Suggested flaws in some alternative courses ===
The report outlines three alternative courses that have been suggested and explains possible flaws in these courses:

Precipitate Withdrawal

Because of the importance of Iraq, the potential for catastrophe, and the role and commitments of the United States in initiating events that have led to the current situation, we believe it would be wrong for the United States to abandon the country through a precipitate withdrawal of troops and support. A premature American departure from Iraq would almost certainly produce greater sectarian violence and further deterioration of conditions, leading to a number of the adverse consequences outlined above. The near-term results would be a significant power vacuum, greater human suffering, regional destabilization, and a threat to the global economy. Al Qaeda would depict our withdrawal as a historic victory. If we leave and Iraq descends into chaos, the long-range consequences could eventually require the United States to return.

Staying the Course

Current U.S. policy is not working, as the level of violence in Iraq is rising and the government is not advancing national reconciliation. Making no changes in policy would simply delay the day of reckoning at a high cost. Nearly 100 Americans are dying every month. The United States is spending $2 billion a week. Our ability to respond to other international crises is constrained. A majority of the American people are soured on the war. This level of expense is not sustainable over an extended period, especially when progress is not being made. The longer the United States remains in Iraq without progress, the more resentment will grow among Iraqis who believe they are subjects of a repressive American occupation. As one U.S. official said to us, "Our leaving would make it worse. ... The current approach without modification will not make it better.

More Troops for Iraq

Sustained increases in U.S. troop levels would not solve the fundamental cause of violence in Iraq, which is the absence of national reconciliation. A senior American general told us that adding U.S. troops might temporarily help limit violence in a highly localized area. However, past experience indicates that the violence would simply rekindle as soon as U.S. forces are moved to another area. As another American general told us, if the Iraqi government does not make political progress, "all the troops in the world will not provide security." Meanwhile, America's military capacity is stretched thin: we do not have the troops or equipment to make a substantial, sustained increase in our troop presence. Increased deployments to Iraq would also necessarily hamper our ability to provide adequate resources for our efforts in Afghanistan or respond to crises around the world.

=== Some other concerns ===
==== Underreporting of violence in Iraq ====
The report also finds that the U.S. government intentionally misled the world by systematically distorting information about the violence in Iraq. As Associated Press Military Writer Robert Burns reports:

The panel pointed to one day last July when U.S. officials reported 93 attacks or significant acts of violence. Yet a careful review of the reports for that single day brought to light 1,100 acts of violence. The standard for recording attacks acts as a filter to keep events out of reports and databases ... Good policy is difficult to make when information is systematically collected in a way that minimizes its discrepancy with policy goals.

== Reactions to the report ==
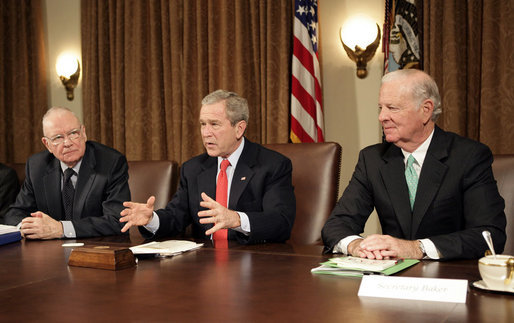
Lee H. Hamilton (left) and James Baker (right) presented the Iraq Study Group Report to George W. Bush on December 6, 2006.

The release of the report garnered swift and sometimes contentious reaction from across the political spectrum. In general, critics of the Bush administration's handling of the war, including liberal media outlets and think tanks, applauded the report's recommendations, particularly those related to troop withdrawal and increased diplomacy with Syria and Iran. Supporters of the war effort, including conservative media outlets and neoconservative think tanks, were highly critical of the report.

=== Praise ===
Leading Democrats praised the report as a vindication of their longstanding criticisms of the war's progress, especially their calls for troop withdrawal. Speaker of the House designate Nancy Pelosi said that "the bipartisan Iraq Study Group has concluded that the President's Iraq policy has failed and must be changed." Senator Evan Bayh (D-IN) echoed this sentiment, saying "Today's report offers the kind of changes we need to improve the current situation in Iraq."

Several Republicans, including Senators Chuck Hagel, Susan Collins and Olympia Snowe, also applauded the report's conclusions. Snowe said that "It gives impetus to both the Congress and hopefully the president" and that "The time has come to change our course and to support a plan ... that ultimately leads to a withdrawal of troops from Iraq." Even more forcefully, Senator Gordon Smith (R-OR), a longstanding supporter of the war, responded to the report by publicly breaking with the Bush administration's, calling Bush' Iraq Policy "absurd" and possibly "criminal".

International media outlets, long critical of the Iraq War and the Bush administration in general, also gave the report positive reviews. The BBC called the report "scathing," and The Guardian's Martin Kettle wrote that: "The ISG report is a repudiation of the Bush administration's foreign policy. But it also repudiates the way the Bush administration works internally." Claude Salhani, editor at UPI, wrote that the "ISG's report comes as a lifeline thrown to a sinking policy after more than three years of war and with no end in sight. It offers Bush an honorable exit strategy from the Iraq quagmire. The question is will the president grab it?"

=== Criticism ===
==== Criticism from U.S. conservatives ====
Longstanding supporters of the war and President Bush were harshly critical of the Iraq Study Group report. The cover of the December 7 New York Post depicts the heads of James Baker and Lee Hamilton superimposed onto the bodies of monkeys, with the headline "Surrender Monkeys: Iraq panel urges U.S. to give up." Neoconservative media pundit Bill Kristol called the report "an evasion" and "not a serious document". Rush Limbaugh asserted that the members of the "Iraq Surrender Group" are "doing everything they can to unite the American people" in "defeat" and "surrender"; and Glenn Beck called the report "Operation White Flag."

On January 5, 2007, the right-leaning American Enterprise Institute released a rival "hawkish" report written by Frederick Kagan and entitled Choosing Victory: A Plan for Success in Iraq, which is also the title of the 14 December 2006 AEI event. The event was titled "Iraq: A Turning Point" and was attended by Senators McCain and Lieberman. The AEI report advocated a troop surge in Iraq, in direct contrast to the Iraq Study Group's call for phased withdrawal. Salon's Mark Benjamin, along with many other commentators, called the AEI group the "Real Iraq Study Group," and noted that "these are the people President Bush listens to." Other AEI events followed this work throughout 2007, including "Sustaining the Surge" on April 25, "Assessing the Surge in Iraq" on July 9, and "No Middle Way – Two Reports on Iraq" on September 6.

==== Criticism from Iraqis ====
Many leading Kurdish politicians were highly critical of the report, particularly its recommendation that the Iraqi central government should maintain tight control over the nation's oil revenues.

Other Iraqis chastised the report for putting American interests over Iraqi interests and for linking issues in Iraq with the Arab–Israeli conflict. Sheik Mohammed Bashar al-Fayadh, a spokesman for the Association of Muslim Scholars, a Sunni Arab group said that the report "guarantees for an exit (from Iraq) but without paying heed to preventing a civil war from breaking out?" Abdul Aziz Hakim, a Shiite and leader of the largest bloc in Iraq's parliament, said that "the problem in Iraq (has) specifically nothing to do with the situation in the middle east today."

==== Criticism of proposal to privatize Iraqi oil ====
Critics of ties between Iraq Study Group members and oil companies were highly critical of the report's recommendations to privatize the Iraqi oil industry. Author Antonia Juhasz argued that this recommendation amounted to a call for "extending the war in Iraq to ensure that US oil companies get what the Bush administration went in there for: control and greater access to Iraq's oil." Similarly, activist Tom Hayden noted that the Iraq Study Group represents the interests of the US oil industry. James A. Baker, III's law firm has interests in debt repayment to Kuwait and other Gulf States. Lawrence S. Eagleburger has ties to Halliburton and Phillips Petroleum, and is a former head of Kissinger Associates, a corporate consulting firm. (Paul Bremer was managing partner of Kissinger Associates.) Vernon E. Jordan, Jr. is a lawyer at Akin Gump who is closely associated with the Bilderberg Group. The expert working groups for the ISG include leaders of Bechtel, two representatives of Citigroup, and PFC Energy, an energy consulting firm.

==== Opposing American Enterprise Institute (AEI) Report ====
The American Enterprise Institute surge study was posted December 14, and was called the "real Iraq Study Group report" by its author. The draft was presented on December 14 by Frederick Kagan, AEI, General Jack Keane, and Kenneth Pollack (Brookings Institution). AEI released its final report to the press on January 5, 2007, under the title "Iraq: A Turning Point (With Reports from Iraq from Senators John McCain and Joseph Lieberman)". The event description stated the following:

The study calls for a large and sustained surge of U.S. forces to secure and protect critical areas of Baghdad. Mr. Kagan directed the report in consultation with military and regional experts, including General Keane, former Afghanistan coalition commander Lieutenant General David Barno, and other officers involved with the successful operations of the 3rd Armored Cavalry Regiment in Tal Afar. An interim version of the report was released on December 14, 2006. At this event, Mr. Kagan and General Keane will present their final report, which outlines how the United States can win in Iraq and why victory is the only acceptable outcome.

The initial AEI report called for an additional surge of 38,000 troops. The ISG mentioned a possible 10,000-20,000 troop increase for training until early 2008 but is not formally part of any of the report's 79 recommendations.

Andrew Ross of the San Francisco Chronicle also connects Bush's strategy to this American Enterprise Institute report, saying "In addition to the changing of the military guard and moving ahead with the 'surge' option, President Bush's Iraq strategy involves more money for reconstruction, job creation, and for 'moderate Iraqi political parties as a means of building a centrist political coalition to support Prime Minister Nouri al-Maliki,' according to the Wall Street Journal. This more holistic approach—reportedly entitled 'The New Way Forward'—echoes in many ways a paper from the American Enterprise Institute, authored by Frederick Kagan, better known as the prime mover of the 'surge option.'"

== See also ==
- U.S. Institute of Peace (facilitator of the Iraq Study Group)
- Iraqi insurgency
