= Reset (military) =

Reset is an evolving military term currently used to describe the equipment refurbishment process. In current U.S. military terms, "reset" refers to "a series of actions to restore units to a desired level of combat capability commensurate with future mission requirements."

== Context specific terminology ==
The military term is somewhat like the financial term "reset", which is a generic concept in the financial world. Reset, which also known as fixing, is a generic concept in the financial markets which refers to the determination and recording of a reference rate, usually in order to calculate the settlement value of a periodic payment schedule between two parties.

The military term is somewhat like the computing term "reset", which means to clear any pending errors or events and bring a system to normal condition or initial state.

The military term "reset" is unlike its finance and computing counterparts in that the military usage anticipates three related components: repairing, replacing and recapitalizing. Military reset, in simplest terms, is intended to reverse the effects of stress on all equipment. Initial funding from Congress was used to reset brigade combat teams involving about 4,000 soldiers and about 40,000 pieces of equipment returning from duty in Afghanistan and Iraq.

=== Repair ===
Repair starts with an inspection followed by maintenance and possible replacement of some parts to bring equipment to original technical specifications.

=== Replacement ===
Replacement means to buy new or to replace equipment destroyed in battle or otherwise too damaged to fix. Also listed under replacement is reserve-component equipment which has been left overseas for other units to use.

=== Recapitalizing ===
Recapitalizing involves overhauling or restoring equipment to improve performance or make it like new from the factory.

Timely funding would be designed to allow military depots to order repair parts in advance of equipment arrival.”

== Strategic reset ==
- Strategic reset is a policy framework designed to strengthen the United States' stance throughout the Middle East. The plan for strategic reset entails four key measures:
- Acknowledging Iraq's political and demographic fragmentation.
- Implementing prompt phased military redeployment.
- Establishing local and regional methods for improving security and diplomacy in the Middle East.
- Developing a functional strategy to resolve the Arab–Israeli conflict.

In 2007, The Washington Post described as "strategic reset" a proposal by U.S. Secretary of State Condoleezza Rice that took the form of "an unusually detailed public explanation of the new American effort to create a de facto alliance between Israel and moderate Arab states against Iranian extremism."

== See also ==
- Logistics
- Military logistics
- Military supply chain management
