= Withdrawal of United States troops from Iraq (2007–2011) =

Withdrawal of American military forces from Iraq
- Part of the Iraq War and the war on terror
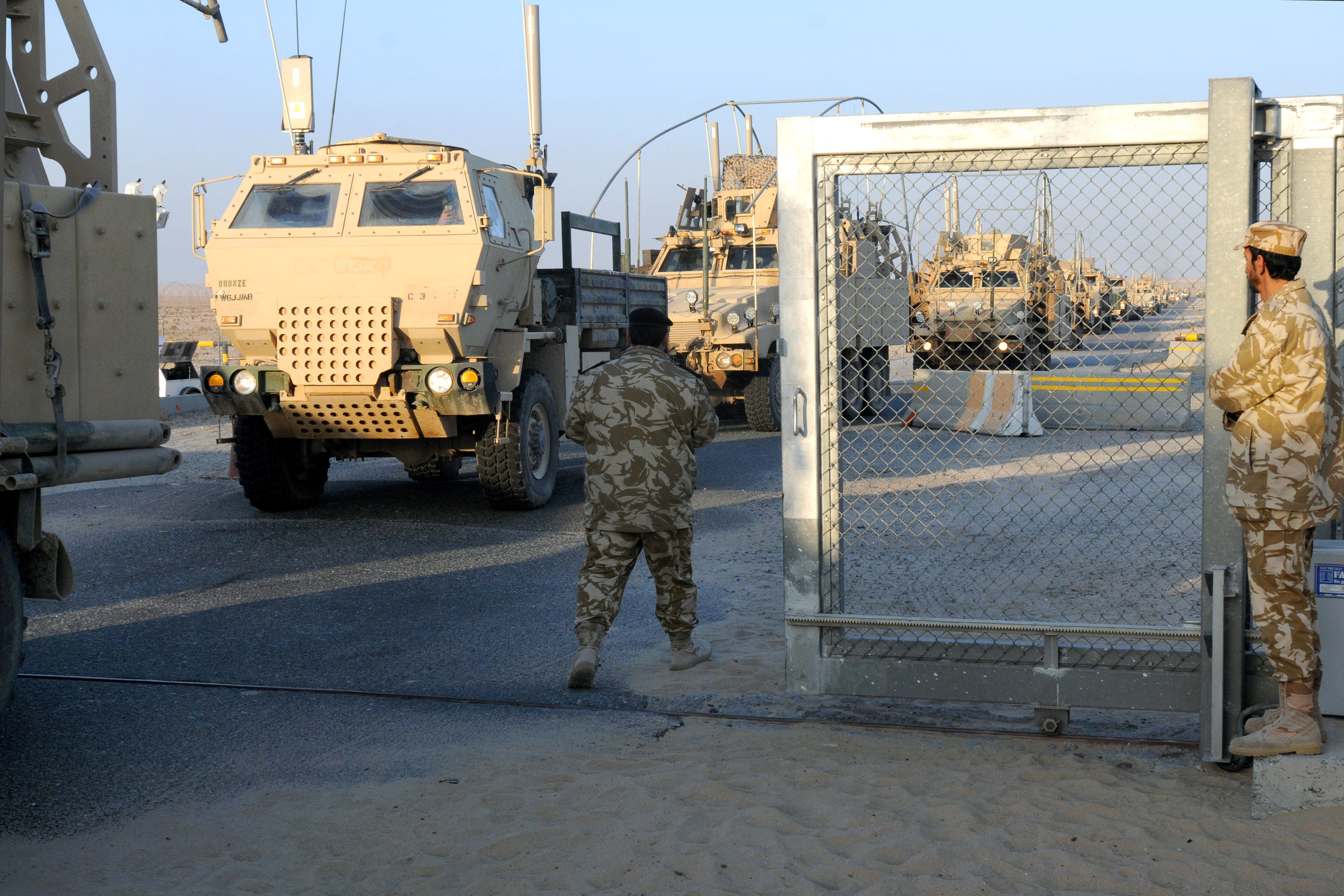
- Kuwaiti soldiers man a border crossing in December 2011, as the last of the U.S. military convoy crosses the border from Iraq into Kuwait, completing the withdrawal
Date	25 December 2007 – 18 December 2011
Location	Iraq–Kuwait border
Result	Withdrawal of U.S. military forces from Iraqi territory; End of the Iraq War; ISI resurgence as ISIL and spread of ISIL into numerous wars worldwide; Return of U.S. forces to Iraq in 2014 to assist Iraqi forces, as well as the rest of the global Operation Inherent Resolve by the U.S. to defeat ISIL

Belligerents
United States	Islamic State of Iraq; Army of the Men of the Naqshbandi Order; Supported by: Syria; Special Groups; Promised Day Brigade; Asa'ib Ahl al-Haq; Kata'ib Hezbollah

Commanders and leaders
(United States) Lloyd Austin	Various

The withdrawal of the United States troops from Iraq began in December 2007 with the end of the Iraq War troop surge of 2007 and was mostly completed by December 2011, bringing an end to the Iraq War. The number of U.S. military forces in Iraq peaked at 170,300 in November 2007.

The withdrawal of U.S. military forces from Iraq was a contentious issue in the United States for much of the 2000s. As the war progressed from its initial invasion phase in 2003 to a nearly decade-long occupation, American public opinion shifted towards favoring a troop withdrawal; in May 2007, 55% of Americans believed that the Iraq War was a mistake, and 51% of registered voters favored troop withdrawal. In late April 2007 Congress passed a supplementary spending bill for Iraq that set a deadline for troop withdrawal but President George W. Bush vetoed this bill, citing his concerns about setting a withdrawal deadline. The Bush administration later sought an agreement with the Iraqi government, and in 2008 Bush signed the U.S.–Iraq Status of Forces Agreement. It included a deadline of 31 December 2011, before which "all the United States Forces shall withdraw from all Iraqi territory". The last U.S. troops left Iraq on 18 December 2011, in accordance with this agreement.

In 2014, the advance of the Islamic State of Iraq and the Levant (ISIL) from Syria to Iraq's western provinces prompted the U.S. to intervene again, alongside other militaries, to combat ISIL. In January 2019, Secretary of State Michael Pompeo put the number of U.S. troops in Iraq at approximately 5,000. In early 2020, the Iraqi parliament voted to withdraw all remaining troops and the Iraqi Prime Minister told the U.S. to start working on troop withdrawal.

== Background ==
=== Polling ===
Immediately before and after the 2003 invasion, most polls within the United States showed a substantial majority supporting war, though since December 2004 polls consistently showed that a majority thought the invasion was a mistake. In the spring of 2007, surveys generally showed a majority in favor of setting a timetable for withdrawal. However, in this area responses can vary widely with the exact wording of the question. Surveys found that most preferred a gradual withdrawal over time to an immediate pullout.

=== 2004 U.S. presidential election ===
The issue was one on which John Kerry and George W. Bush differed in the 2004 U.S. presidential election. Kerry said in August 2004 that he would make the withdrawal of all U.S. forces from Iraq a goal of his first presidential term. However, he did not offer a deadline or a timetable, and proposed an increase in deployment size in the immediate future. In the debate, he said that he reiterated that withdrawal was a goal, if an initial troop increase works.

In the debate, Bush did not offer any timetable or estimate of troops, either increasing or decreasing, but said only that the commanders of the troops in Iraq had the ability to ask for whatever force they needed. In general, this is consistent with his earlier remarks. When questioned about troop strength, Bush and then-Secretary of Defense Donald Rumsfeld said that they were using the troops asked for by the general staff.

=== Congressional proposals and acts ===
On 17 November 2005, Representative John Murtha (D-PA) introduced H.J.Res. 73, a resolution calling for U.S. forces in Iraq to be "redeployed at the earliest practicable date" to stand as a quick-reaction force in U.S. bases in neighboring countries such as Kuwait. In response, Republicans proposed a resolution that "the deployment of United States forces in Iraq be terminated immediately," without any provision for redeployment, which was voted down 403–3.

On 16 June 2006, the House voted 256–153 in a non-binding resolution against establishing a deadline for the withdrawal of troops from Iraq. Republican then-House Majority Leader John Boehner, who argued against a deadline, stated "achieving victory is our only option", and "we must not shy away". On the other hand, Democratic then-House Minority Leader Nancy Pelosi argued that a deadline is necessary, and stated "'stay the course' is not a strategy, it's a slogan", and "it's time to face the facts."

On 27 March 2007, Congress passed H.R. 1591, which called for the withdrawal of U.S. troops in Iraq by March 2008. However, President Bush vetoed the bill and the House of Representatives failed to override the veto. Congress then passed H.R. 2206, which provided funding for the Iraq War through 30 September 2007 and was signed into law by President Bush on 25 May 2007. H.R. 2206 included eighteen benchmarks for the Iraqi government to meet.

On 9 May 2007, Representative Jim McGovern introduced H.R. 2237 to the House, "To provide for the redeployment of United States Armed Forces and defense contractors from Iraq." The bill failed with a vote of 255 to 171, 13 of the Nays coming from Democrats representing districts won by John Kerry in 2004.

On 12 July 2007, the House passed H.R. 2956 by a vote of 223–201, for redeployment (or withdrawal) of U.S. armed forces out of Iraq. The resolution requires most troops to withdraw from Iraq by 1 April 2008.

On 18 July 2007, after an all-night debate, the Senate blocked the passage of a bill that would have set a troop withdrawal timetable with a vote of 52–47. The withdrawal would have started within 120 days, and would have required that all troops (except an unspecified number could be left behind to conduct a very narrow set of missions) be out of the country by 30 April 2008.

=== McGovern-Polk proposal ===
George McGovern and William R. Polk published a detailed proposal for U.S. withdrawal from Iraq in their book Out of Iraq: A Practical Plan for Withdrawal Now. A sizable excerpt was published in the October 2006 edition of Harper's magazine. This plan was completely abandoned. Some of the basic features of their proposal included:

- The first soldiers to be sent home should be private security contractors.
- An international stabilization force of 15,000 soldiers to be established. Troops will be drawn from Morocco, Tunisia, and Egypt, funded by the U.S. This force would remain for two years after the departure of U.S. troops.
- Transport, communications, and light arms equipment currently used by U.S. forces should be donated to the new multinational force.
- In place of a new Iraqi army, a national reconstruction corps should be established, modeled on the U.S. Army Corps of Engineers.
- The immediate cessation of work on U.S. military bases.
- U.S. withdrawal from the Green Zone.
- Release of all prisoners of war.

=== ANSWER, NION, UFPJ positions ===
The three largest coalitions which organized demonstrations against the invasion of Iraq in 2003, United for Peace and Justice (UFPJ), Act Now to Stop War and End Racism (ANSWER), and Not in Our Name (NION), have all called for the immediate withdrawal of all U.S. troops, "out now." The anti-war movement has debated whether to support existing proposals in Congress.

The UFPJ legislative working group has endorsed Murtha's redeployment proposal "because it is a powerful vehicle to begin the debate on the war," though the organization as a whole has not taken a position. ANSWER, on the other hand, has stated that "Murtha has not adopted an antiwar position. He wants to redeploy militarily to strengthen the hand of U.S. imperialism in the Middle East."

=== Burner Plan ===
The Burner Plan, formally entitled A Responsible Plan to End the War in Iraq, was a 36-page policy paper presented 17 March 2008 by Darcy Burner and other 2008 Democratic congressional candidates, in cooperation with some retired national security officials. The plan outlined policy measures the candidates pledged to support in the 2008 United States presidential election.

== Formulation of Withdrawal Plans ==
=== Withdrawals under President Bush ===
On 13 September 2007, President Bush announced that the 168,000 American troops in Iraq at that time would be reduced by 5,700 by Christmas and that additional troops would be withdrawn bringing the total U.S. troop level down from 20 to 15 combat brigades by July 2008. By the end of 2008, U.S. troops in Iraq had been reduced to 146,000.

=== 2008 U.S.–Iraq Status of Forces Agreement ===
In 2008 the American and Iraqi governments signed the U.S.–Iraq Status of Forces Agreement. It included a specific date, 30 June 2009, by which American forces should withdraw from Iraqi cities, and a complete withdrawal date from Iraqi territory by 31 December 2011. On 14 December 2008 then-President George W. Bush signed the security agreement with Iraq. In his fourth and final trip to Iraq, President Bush appeared in a televised news conference with Iraq's prime minister Nouri al-Maliki to celebrate the agreement and applauded security gains in Iraq saying that just two years ago "such an agreement seemed impossible".

=== President Obama's speech on 27 February 2009 ===
On 27 February 2009, at Marine Corps Base Camp Lejeune in North Carolina, President Barack Obama announced his revision to the original date of withdrawal of combat troops from Iraq. The revision was to extend the original date of 30 June 2009 for an additional 10 months, to 31 August 2010. President Obama reaffirmed commitment to the original complete withdrawal date of 31 December 2011, set by the agreement between the Bush administration and the Iraqi government. President Obama defined the task of the transitional force as "training, equipping, and advising Iraqi Security Forces as long as they remain non-sectarian; conducting targeted counter-terrorism missions; and protecting our ongoing civilian and military efforts within Iraq".

== Withdrawal ==
=== August 2010 partial withdrawal ===
On 19 August 2010 the 4th Stryker Brigade, 2nd Infantry Division was the last American combat brigade to withdraw from Iraq.

In a speech at the Oval Office on 31 August 2010 Obama declared: "the American combat mission in Iraq has ended. Operation Iraqi Freedom is over, and the Iraqi people now have lead responsibility for the security of their country."

About 50,000 American troops remained in the country in an advisory capacity as part of "Operation New Dawn," which ran until the end of 2011. The U.S. military continued to train and advise the Iraqi Forces.

=== Full withdrawal (2011) ===
With the collapse of discussions about extending the stay of U.S. troops, President Obama announced the full withdrawal of troops from Iraq, as previously scheduled, on 21 October 2011. The U.S. retained an embassy in Baghdad with some 17,000 personnel, consulates in Basra, Mosul, and Kirkuk were allocated more than 1,000 staff each, and between 4,000 and 5,000 defense contractors also stayed in Iraq. President Obama and al-Maliki outlined a broad agenda for post-war cooperation without American troops in Iraq during a joint press conference on 12 December 2011 at the White House. This agenda included cooperation on energy, trade and education as well as cooperation in security, counter-terrorism, economic development and strengthening Iraq's institutions. Both leaders said their countries would maintain strong security, diplomatic and economic ties after the last U.S. combat forces withdraw.

President Barack Obama paid tribute to the troops who served in Iraq on 14 December 2011, at the Fort Bragg military base in North Carolina. As the last of the American troops prepared to exit Iraq, he said the United States was leaving behind a "sovereign, stable and self-reliant" Iraq. On 15 December, an American military ceremony was held in Baghdad putting a formal end to the U.S. mission in Iraq. The last 500 soldiers left Iraq on the morning of 18 December 2011. A small contingent of U.S. Marines responsible for protecting diplomats and approximately 160 weapons-sales personnel remained, which CBS News described as "standard functions at most American embassies around the world". At the time of withdrawal, the United States had one remaining soldier, Staff Sergeant Ahmed K. Altaie, still missing in Iraq since 23 October 2006, and had offered a $50,000 (equivalent to $79,850 in 2025) reward for his recovery. On 26 February 2012, his death was confirmed.

== See also ==
- Withdrawal of United States troops from Afghanistan (2011–2016) (comparable event)
- Vietnamization (comparable event)
- House Concurrent Resolution 63: Disapproval of troop surge
- Kerry–Feingold Amendment
- Opposition to the Iraq War
- Strategic reset
- Iraqi insurgency (2003–2011)
