= Timeline of the Iraq War troop surge of 2007 =

Timeline of the Iraq War troop surge of 2007

== January 2007 ==
U.S. troop levels in Iraq are at 132,000.

- January 5, 2007: Senate Majority Leader Harry Reid and House Speaker Nancy Pelosi sent a letter to Bush stating, "Surging forces is a strategy that you have already tried and that has already failed. Like many current and former military leaders, we believe that trying again would be a serious mistake."
- January 10, 2007: Bush officially announces the troop surge. "I've committed more than 20,000 additional American troops to Iraq." Also in his speech, Bush defines the objective of the surge as "to create a united, democratic. federal Iraq...", and the means, "Our troops will have a well-defined mission: to help Iraqis clear and secure neighborhoods, to help them protect the local population, and to help ensure that the Iraqi forces left behind are capable of providing the security that Baghdad needs."
- January 11, 2007: Senator Chuck Hagel (R-Neb) stated the surge was, "The most dangerous foreign policy blunder in this country since Vietnam."
- January 18:
  - Harry Reid issues excerpts from Senate testimonies under the title "The Iraq Accountability Project: A Wrap-Up of This Week's Senate Oversight on Iraq"
- January 19 --
  - During a news conference with Secretary of Defense Robert Gates, the top U.S. commander in Iraq Gen. George Casey estimated that the 21,500 additional U.S. troops sent to Iraq will only need to stay until around late summer.
  - Three four star generals testified to the Senate Foreign Relations Committee advising that the US pull out of Iraq
    - Gen. Jack Keane said he recommended sending far more troops than the 21,500 envisaged in the president's plan and he also said he opposed allowing Iraqi military forces to take the leading role in the envisaged Baghdad operations. Giving Iraqi forces the lead role "makes no sense to me. I don't understand that," Keane said in his testimony
    - Barry McCaffrey said "I personally think the surge of five U.S. Army brigades and a few Marine battalions dribbled out over five months is a fool's errand."
    - Marine Gen. Joseph Hoar, the former head of U.S. Central Command, or CENTCOM, which includes the Iraq theater of operations, urged a full pull-out of U.S. forces from Iraq, saying "In the Marines, we say, 'When you're in a hole, stop digging.'"
- January 22, 2007: Senator John Warner (R-VA) introduces resolution opposing Bush's Iraq plan.

== February, 2007 ==
- February 16, 2007: The House of Representatives passes a resolution opposing Bush's troop surge by a vote of 246-182, marking the first time in four years that Congress has voted decisively against Bush's Iraq policy.
- February 17, 2007: The government of Iraq and coalition forces announce operation Fardh Al Qanoon (Enforcing the Law), a major Baghdad security plan led by the Iraqi government. It is the first of numerous operations that peak during the summer of 2007.

== March, 2007 ==
- March 2, 2007: The Pentagon states that 7,000 more troops will be sent to Iraq. "President Bush's planned escalation of U.S. forces in Iraq will require as many as 28,500 troops, Pentagon officials told a Senate committee Thursday."
- March 20, 2007: U.S. Troop strength is 152,000
- March 27, 2007: McCain tells CNN's Wolf Blitzer, "General Petraeus goes out there almost every day in an unarmed humvee. I think you oughta catch up. You are giving the old line of three months ago. I understand it. We certainly don't get it through the filter of some of the media." He later acknowledges, "There is no unarmored humvees. Obviously, that's the case."

== April, 2007 ==
U.S. troop levels in Iraq are at 150,000.

- April 5, 2007: 12,000 more National Guard troops are to be sent to Iraq and Afghanistan. "Coming on the heels of a controversial 'surge' of 21,000 U.S. troops that has stretched the Army thin, the Defense Department is preparing to send an additional 12,000 National Guard combat forces to Iraq and Afghanistan."
- April 26, 2007: Senate approves Iraq withdrawal bill. "The Senate on Thursday narrowly passed legislation ordering U.S. troops to begin coming home from Iraq by Oct. 1. The vote was 51-46. The House on Wednesday passed the same war spending bill, and President Bush next week is expected to receive, and swiftly reject, the legislation. The veto could fall on the fourth anniversary of the president's Iraq 'victory' speech, which is Tuesday."
- April 26, 2007: Gen. Petraeus warns, the war in Iraq is, "'exceedingly complex and very tough' … and said the U.S. effort might become more difficult before it gets easier." He further states that, "We are just getting started with the new effort."

== May, 2007 ==
- May 25, 2007: Four months after the announcement of the troop surge, Congress passes H.R. 2206, and was signed into law by the President. Within the $120 billion war-spending bill are 18 benchmarks that grade Iraqi government progress toward stability.

The bill states that the purpose of these benchmarks is for congress to form the future strategy in regards to Iraq. "The United States strategy in Iraq, hereafter, shall be conditioned on the Iraqi government meeting benchmarks…" The bill contains no wording on the conditions for withdrawal or as the success criteria for the surge.

== June, 2007 ==
- June 3, 2007: "The intensity of combat and the greater lethality of attacks on U.S. troops is underscored by the lower ratio of wounded to killed for May, which fell to about 4.8 to 1 — compared with an average of 8 to 1 in the Iraq conflict, according to Pentagon data. 'The closer you get to a stand-up fight, the closer you're going to get to that 3-to-1 ratio' that typified 20th-century U.S. warfare, said John Pike, director of Globalsecurity.org, a defense information Web site."
- June 4, 2007: Former U.S. Commander In Iraq Lt. Gen. Ricardo Sanchez states, "I think if we do the right things politically and economically with the right Iraqi leadership we could still salvage at least a stalemate, if you will — not a stalemate but at least stave off defeat,"
- June 11, 2007: U.S. forces arming Sunni tribes. American commanders are turning to a strategy, "that they acknowledge is fraught with risk: arming Sunni Arab groups that have promised to fight militants linked with Al Qaeda who have been their allies in the past." Critics say the plan "could amount to the Americans' arming both sides in a future civil war."
- June 15, 2007: The troop surge operations begin. The U.S. military reports that 28,000 troops required for the surge have arrived in Iraq and that the surge operations can now commence. "All the forces initially identified as part of the surge have completed their strategic movements into theatre in Iraq,"

== July, 2007 ==
- July 15, 2007: A White House interim report assessed that 7 of the 18 Iraqi benchmarks have yet to be satisfactorily met, with one additional benchmark meeting with mixed success. The remaining ten benchmarks were assessed as being unsatisfactorily met.

A report by the GAO, a congressional research arm states that Iraq has not satisfied 11 of the 18 benchmarks, and an additional three have mixed results.

== August, 2007 ==
- August 13, 2007: Statements by British lawmakers indicate the United Kingdom's lack of confidence in the surge. The Labour-led foreign affairs committee said boosting American forces on the streets of Baghdad even further would not bring an end to the violence, and was unlikely to succeed.

== September, 2007 ==
U.S. troop surge hits its peak strength at 168,000. This number is maintained until November 2007 when troops begin drawdown.

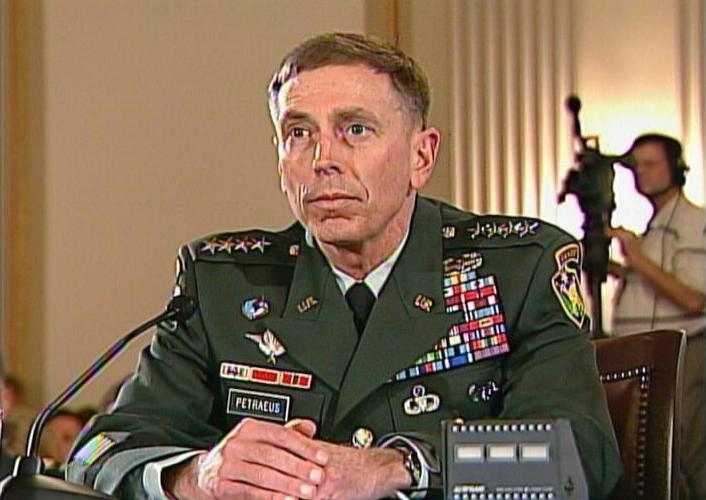
Gen. David Petraeus, the top U.S. military commander in Iraq, appears before Congress to testify on assessments of the progress in Iraq, shown here Sept. 10, 2007

- September 10–11, 2007: General David Petraeus and Ambassador to Iraq Ryan Crocker report to the United States Congress on the progress of the troop surge. In Petraeus' report, he states that the surge had largely met its military goals. During the testimony, Senator Hillary Clinton tells General Petraeus that his progress report required a 'willing suspension of disbelief'.

== November, 2007 ==
- November 1, 2007: The BBC reports that the downward trend appears to confirm the Pentagon claims that its "surge" strategy is working.
- November 1, 2007: The independent think-tank the Brookings Institution records a downward trend in US non-combat fatalities: 42 in September, 75 in August, 69 in July, 92 in June and 121 in May.
- November 24, 2007: The troop surge in Iraq was effectively declared over when officials announced that 5,000 soldiers from the 3rd Brigade, 1st Cavalry Division would be withdrawn from Iraq without replacement in response to declining violence. The brigade had been stationed in Diyala province.
- November 28, 2007: Presidential candidate Joe Biden (D-DE) states his view on the troop surge, "This whole notion that the surge is working is fantasy."
- November 30, 2007: U.S. Rep. John Murtha (D-PA), an outspoken congressional critic of the Iraq war, said he saw signs of significant military progress during a brief trip to the Middle East. "I think the 'surge' is working." Murtha clarified his statement later that day, stating that "The fact remains that the war in Iraq cannot be won militarily, and that we must begin an orderly redeployment of U.S. forces from Iraq as soon as practicable" and that the Iraqi government has "failed to capitalize on the political and diplomatic steps that the surge was designed to provide."

== February, 2008 ==
- February 16, 2008: Lieutenant General Carter Ham says that, when the surge ends in July 2008, the number of troops left in the country will be greater than the initial number. ""It's likely that the number will be a little bit larger than the 132,000 or so that was the number of personnel on the ground pre-surge".
