= Kerry–Feingold Amendment =

The Kerry and Feingold Amendment (June 2006) proposed the withdrawal of American armed forces from Iraq by July 2007 with the exception of a few to maintain security. The proposal was defeated in the United States Senate in an 86 to 13 vote.

== Vote Summary ==
- Question: On the Amendment (Kerry Amdt. No. 4442 )
- Vote Number: 181
- Vote Date: June 22, 2006, 11:07 AM
- Required For Majority: 1/2
- Vote Result: Amendment Rejected
- Amendment Number: S.Amdt. 4442 to S. 2766 (National Defense Authorization Act for Fiscal Year 2007 )

=== Statement of Purpose ===
To require the redeployment of United States Armed Forces from Iraq in order to further a political solution in Iraq, encourage the people of Iraq to provide for their own security, and achieve victory in the war on terror.

=== Vote Counts ===
- YEAs: 13
- NAYs: 86
- Not Voting: 1

== See also ==
- House Concurrent Resolution 63: Disapproval of troop surge
- Iraq Conflict
