= Iraq Study Group =

2006 bipartisan US Congressional panel

Cover of the report

The Iraq Study Group (ISG), also known as the Baker-Hamilton Commission, was a ten-person bipartisan panel appointed on March 15, 2006, by the United States Congress, that was charged with assessing the situation in Iraq and the US-led Iraq War and making policy recommendations. The panel was led by former Secretary of State James Baker and former Democratic congressman from Indiana Lee H. Hamilton and was first proposed by Virginia Republican Representative Frank Wolf.

The Iraq Study Group was facilitated by the United States Institute of Peace, which released the Iraq Study Group's final report on their website on December 6, 2006. The report described the situation in Iraq as "grave and deteriorating" and was the culmination of interviews with 170 people, a trip to Iraq, and seven months of research and policy analysis.

== Members ==
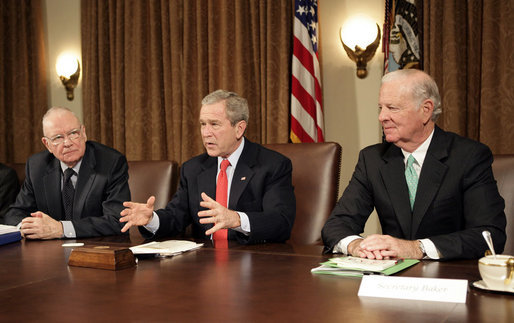
Lee H. Hamilton (left) and James Baker (right) presented the Iraq Study Group Report to George W. Bush on December 6, 2006.

The ISG was led by co-chairs James Baker, a former Secretary of State (Republican), and Lee H. Hamilton, a former U.S. Representative (Democrat).

=== Republicans ===
In addition to Baker, the panel's Republican members were:

- Sandra Day O'Connor, former Supreme Court Justice
- Lawrence Eagleburger, former Secretary of State
- Edwin Meese III, former US Attorney General
- Alan K. Simpson, former U.S. Senator from Wyoming

=== Democrats ===
In addition to Hamilton, the panel's Democratic members were:

- Vernon Jordan, Jr., business executive
- Leon Panetta, former White House Chief of Staff
- William J. Perry, former US Secretary of Defense
- Charles S. Robb, former Governor and U.S. Senator from Virginia

=== Former members ===
Two of the panel's original members (both Republicans) resigned before the group's final report was released:

- Rudy Giuliani, former Mayor of New York City, resigned on May 24. He had missed most of the group's meetings, and in his resignation letter, he cited "previous time commitments" as his reason for resigning. (During the first month of meetings of the panel, Giuliani had received $1.7 million for giving 20 speeches to various groups.) When the group's report came out in December 2006, Giuliani gave a different reason—that he did not think it was right for an active presidential candidate to take part in such an "apolitical" panel. He was replaced by Edwin Meese.
- Robert Gates, former U.S. Secretary of Defense and former Director of Central Intelligence, resigned from the panel after he was nominated for Secretary of Defense on November 8. He was replaced by Lawrence Eagleburger.

== Funding and support ==
The panel's work was facilitated by the U.S. Institute of Peace and supported by the Center for Strategic and International Studies (CSIS), the Center for the Study of the Presidency (CSP), and the James A. Baker III Institute for Public Policy. It was expected to receive a US$1.3 million appropriation from Congress.

== Activities ==
=== Domestic ===
The ISG met members of the U.S. national security team, along with President Bush, on November 13. Before this announcement it was reported that Baker was in regular contact with the White House, especially with National Security Advisor Stephen Hadley and President Bush.

=== International ===
On 11 November 2006, it was announced that UK Prime Minister Tony Blair, who has supported President Bush in the Iraq war, was to give evidence to the ISG. A Downing Street spokesman said that Blair would give his submissions via video link on 14 November. It was believed at the time that the UK Prime Minister would outline his ideas on Iraq in a major foreign policy speech on Monday, 13 November.

== Internal arguments ==
According to a report in late November 2006 in Newsday, internal strife, the assassination of a cabinet minister in Lebanon, and opposition from President Bush to the group recommending negotiations with Iran and Syria was challenging the commission's intent to issue a consensus report. An Iraq expert told the newspaper that there "has been a lot of fighting" among the expert advisers to the group, mainly between conservatives and liberals.

== Recommendations ==
Although the final report was not released until December 6, 2006, media reports ahead of that date described some possible recommendations by the panel. Among them were the beginning of a phased withdrawal of US combat forces from Iraq and direct US dialogue with Syria and Iran over Iraq and the Middle East. The Iraq Study Group also found that the Pentagon has underreported significantly the extent of the violence in Iraq and that officials have obtained little information regarding the source of these attacks. The group further described the situation in Afghanistan as so disastrous that they may need to divert troops from Iraq in order to help stabilize the country. After these reports began surfacing, co-chair James Baker warned that the group should not be expected to produce a "magic bullet" to resolve the Iraqi conflict.

According to a report in late November, the Iraq Study Group had "strongly urged" a large pull back of American troops in Iraq. The final report released on December 6, 2006 included 79 recommendations and was 160 pages in length.

By March 2007, the ISG report had been downloaded more than 1.5 million times, according to the US Institute for Peace website. The Report is readily available for direct reading. Some (of many) results include: assessing stability as 'elusive' and the situation as "deteriorating", that all of Iraq's neighbors (including Iran and Syria) must be included in an external diplomatic effort to stabilize Iraq, that worldwide commitments limit the U.S. from greatly increasing troop strength in Iraq, and that U.S attention on Iraq diverted resources from Afghanistan (an imbalance which the Report says the U.S. should restore to prevent Taliban and Al-Queada resurgence). There are many more recommendations.

Among these, one significant recommendation was the suggestion that there should be a substantially increased transfer of power to the 'new ruling elite' in Iraq. This, according to Toby Dodge, was recommended 'in the hope that they could succeed where the US government and military ha[d] so far failed', and with the notion that it would in turn enable a more imminent withdrawal of some US forces from Iraq (as mentioned), with one effect of decreasing the number of US soldiers being killed or injured.

== Views about the report ==
At a news conference with the British Prime Minister Tony Blair in Washington on December 6, 2006 President George W. Bush commented on the Iraq Study Group's report and admitted for the first time that a "new approach" is needed in Iraq, that the situation in Iraq is "bad" and that the task ahead was "daunting". President Bush said he would not accept every recommendation by the ISG panel but promised that he would take the report seriously. President Bush waited for three other studies from the Pentagon, the U.S. State Department and the National Security Council before charting the new course on Iraq. On US foreign policy, President Bush warned that he would only talk to Iran if it suspended uranium enrichment and bring Syria on board if it stops funding the opposition in Lebanon, extends support to the Lebanese government of Prime Minister Fouad Siniora and provides economic help to Iraq.

Frederick Kagan, scholar at the American Enterprise Institute (AEI) along with General Jack Keane, U.S. Army (retired) introduced the idea for a troop surge in Iraq at a 14 December 2006 event at AEI and again at a 5 January 2007 event attended by Senators John McCain and Joseph Lieberman. The report "Choosing Victory: A Plan for Success in Iraq" was released at the latter conference. While the ISG report was ostensibly the driving force for a policy change in Iraq, the AEI report outlined the actual policy adopted by the Bush Administration.

Antonia Juhasz noted the study's focus on Iraqi oil in the opening chapter and in Recommendation 63 and concluded that the Iraq Study Group would extend the Iraq War until American oil companies have guaranteed legal access to all of Iraq's oil fields.

Iraqi President Jalal Talabani called the group's conclusions "very dangerous" to Iraq's sovereignty and constitution. "As a whole, I reject this report," Talabani said.

The International Crisis Group, who produced their own report on the Iraq Study Group's findings and the situation in Iraq more broadly following the ISG report, argued that the study represented a belated and necessary shift in the American political elite's thinking on US policy in Iraq. As such, they suggested it should be welcomed. The report's apparent recognition of many of the failures of the US-led invasion, especially in security terms, and its recommendation of a changed approach to American foreign policy in the Middle East generally, also received support from significant sections of the academic community in the US who had increasingly grown more critical of the nature of American involvement in Iraq (albeit from varying perspectives) as the situation in the country appeared to be deteriorating further.

Support from the International Crisis Group (ICG) came, in particular, for most of the Iraq Study Group's major recommendations mentioned above, and also for its further conclusions that a re-engagement with the Israeli-Palestinian conflict, a 'reintegration' of former Baath Party members, and efforts to allow a more inclusive political process in Iraq, were all necessary steps towards addressing the country's - and the region's - problems. However, the praise from the ICG was qualified. Its report argued that the study failed to match its conclusions with sufficiently radical proposals for bringing about fundamental policy change. For example, the ICG criticised the Iraq Study Group for not having stressed the centrality of multi-lateralism in processes attempting to address the situation in Iraq. In terms of building regional co-operation, which it views as vital to the long-term resolution of the conflict, the ICG also advocated 'altered strategic goals' on the part of the US, 'renouncing in particular ambitions to forcibly remodel the Middle East'.

== See also ==
- Iraq oil law (2007)
