= Iraq War troop surge =

Increase in US soldiers stationed in Iraq

- Part of the Iraq War, the Iraqi insurgency, and the Iraqi civil war
- Development of troop strength
Date	January 10, 2007 – July 2008
Location	Iraq
Result	Escalating the Iraq War by increasing US military intervention to deal with Al Qaeda and Iraqi insurgencies.

Conflicts after 2003 invasion of Iraq
Post-invasion (2003–11); Iraq; United States; United Kingdom MNF–I (2003–09): United States (2003–09); United Kingdom (2003–09); Australia (2003–09); Romania (2003–09); Azerbaijan (2003–08); Jordan (2003–05); United Arab Emirates (2003); Kuwait (2003–08); Estonia (2003–09); El Salvador (2003–09); Bulgaria (2003–08); Moldova (2003–08); Albania (2003–08); Ukraine (2003–08); Denmark (2003–08); Czech Republic (2003–08); South Korea (2003–08); Singapore (2003–08); Bosnia and Herzegovina (2003–08); Republic of Macedonia (2003–08); Latvia (2003–08); Poland (2003–08); Kazakhstan (2003–08); Mongolia (2003–08); Georgia (2003–08); Tonga (2004–08); Japan (2004–08); Armenia (2005–08); Slovakia (2003–07); Lithuania (2003–07); Italy (2003–06); Norway (2003–06); Hungary (2003–05); Netherlands (2003–05); Portugal (2003–05); New Zealand (2003–04); Thailand (2003–04); Philippines (2003–04); Honduras (2003–04); Dominican Republic (2003–04); Spain (2003–04); Nicaragua (2003–04); Iceland (2003–04); Awakening Council Supported by: Iran: Artesh; Iraqi Kurdistan: Peshmerga	Post-invasion (2003–11); Ba'ath loyalists: SCJL; (Ba'athist Iraq) JRTN; Sunni insurgents: AQI (2004–06); ISI (from 2006); IAI; Ansar al-Sunnah (2003–07); Others	Shia insurgents: Mahdi Army; Special Groups; Asa'ib Ahl al-Haq; Others; Supported by: Iran: IRGC; Quds Force

In 2007, during the Iraq War, the George W. Bush administration increased the number of U.S. military combat troops in Iraq in order to provide security to Baghdad and Al Anbar Governorate. The event has been called the troop surge or simply the surge.

The force surge was developed under the working title "The New Way Forward" and was announced in January 2007 by Bush during a television speech. Bush ordered the deployment of more than 20,000 soldiers into Iraq (five additional brigades), and sent the majority of them into Baghdad. He also extended the tour of most of the Army troops in country and some of the Marines already in Anbar. The President described the overall objective as establishing a "unified, democratic federal Iraq that can govern itself, defend itself, and sustain itself, and is an ally in the war on terror." The major element of the strategy was a change in focus for the U.S. military "to help Iraqis clear and secure neighborhoods, to help them protect the local population, and to help ensure that the Iraqi forces left behind are capable of providing the security". The President stated that the surge would then provide the time and conditions conducive to reconciliation between communities.

Initiated against strong domestic opposition and after the Republican defeat in the 2006 midterm elections, the surge was considered to be extremely difficult politically. One White House staffer explained the political rationale succinctly: "If you're going to be a bear, be a grizzly." In retrospect, Hillary Clinton, Barack Obama and other critics of the surge have argued that it was successful.

== Terminology ==
The phrases "New Way Forward", "The New Way Forward" and "A new way forward in Iraq" were widely used by White House Press Secretary Tony Snow and the news media prior to the President's speech on January 10, 2007, announcing the policy change. The US press also refers to the increase as a "surge" or "Iraq troop surge". Following the speech, some Democrats began using the term "escalation" rather than "surge", though others in the party used the terms interchangeably.

== Background ==
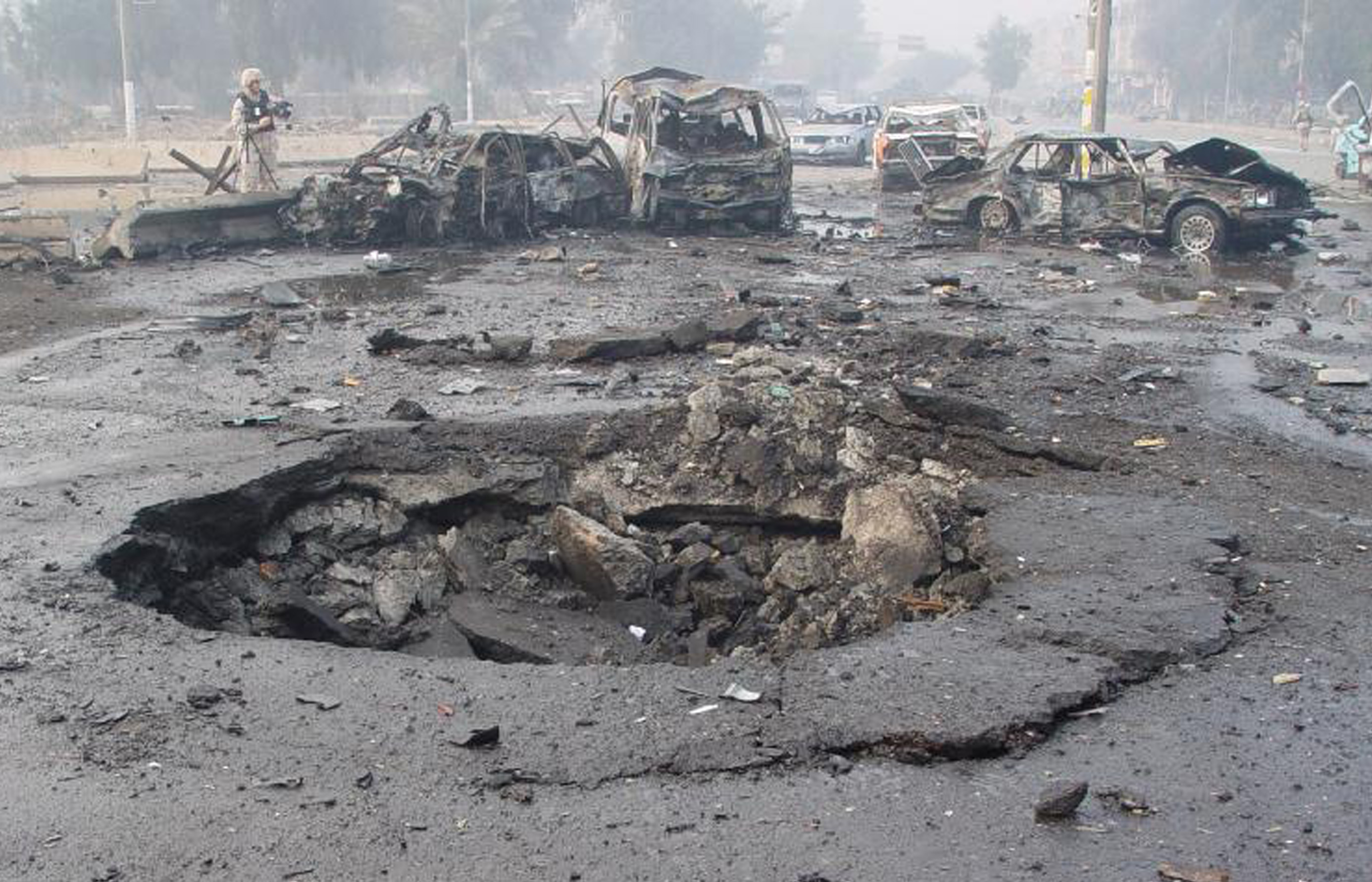
Car bombing in Baghdad

=== Demand ===
==== 2006 election ====
Polls showed that after the 2006 general election, "A substantial majority of Americans expect Democrats to reduce or end American military involvement in Iraq if they [won] control of Congress". This view of the election as a referendum on the war was endorsed by Democratic leader Nancy Pelosi who in the final days of the campaign said, "This election is about Iraq. If indeed it turns out the way that people expect it to turn out, the American people will have spoken, and they will have rejected the course of action the president is on." The news media viewed the Democratic victory in both houses of the US Congress as "punishing President George W. Bush and his Republicans over ethics scandals in Washington and a failing war in Iraq."

==== Democratic position ====
After her party's victory then House Speaker-elect Pelosi (who would a month later make clear her disdain for the "surge proposal") wrote an article entitled "Bringing the War to an End is my Highest Priority as Speaker". The article explained that after visiting wounded Iraq War veterans at the Bethesda Naval Medical Center, "I left there more committed than ever to bringing the war to an end. I told my colleagues yesterday that the biggest ethical issue facing our country for the past three and a half years is the war in Iraq. ... When the House reconvenes on January 4, 2007, Democrats will take power and I will take the gavel knowing the responsibility we have to you and to the country. The new Democratic Congress will live up to the highest ethical standard... [we] are prepared to lead and ready to govern. We will honor the trust of the American people; we will not disappoint."

==== Republican position ====
Following the 2006 United States midterm elections in which Republicans lost control of the House and Senate, The Heritage Foundation hosted a conference chaired by Republican whip Rep. Roy Blunt (R-MO), titled, "The New Way Forward: Refocusing the Conservative Agenda" on November 9, 2006, to analyze "setbacks" from the election results. Blunt bemoaned the fact Republicans had "become the defenders rather than the challengers of business as usual."

Blunt opened his speech listing the oft voiced explanations of his party's defeat which included that the results were in part "a referendum on the war in Iraq". He dismissed the notion that any one single reason explained the loss, saying "Different candidates lost for different reasons." He saw a bright side in events saying:

The good news is that even with these shortcomings, low presidential approval numbers, and uncertainty about Iraq, our candidates saw, even with all those things happening, their ideas taking hold in the final days of their campaigns. A shift of 78,000 votes in the entire country would have changed the outcome. Our ideas didn't get beat; in fact, we did.

He applauded the Constitutional system saying the defeat proves:

that no one party has a permanent claim to power. ... This means any viable political movement, such as ours, can never afford to become stagnant or complacent. We must constantly refresh our ideas, assess our performance, and make corrections when necessary. This is a great moment to do all three of those things. For a generation Reagan conservatives have consistently demonstrated an ability to do just that. Nowhere has this been more evident than in our response to the threats of Islamic totalitarianism and the fight with our terrorist enemies.

He said:

While the threats of Islamic totalitarianism at times require different tactics, we are approaching those challenges with the same resolve that allowed us to defeat communism. I am convinced that in this fight we will also prevail because the American people understand the need to win. We must continue to lead the fight against Islamic totalitarianism and sustain the will to win the war in Iraq and Afghanistan. ... [On the war and on domestic issues] Our plan must avoid the mistakes of the past several years. ... I am confident that we will successfully move forward.

=== Development of the strategy ===
==== Senturion forecasts ====
In January 2005, the National Defense University applied its "Senturion" predictive analysis software to the Iraqi elections in order to determine which factions would support the elections, which would oppose them, and which would remain neutral. Senturion's forecasts were largely borne out by the actual course of events. Among other things, Senturion predicted that "increased coalition military strength in Iraq would have improved the attitudes of Iraqi stake holders toward the election by making them feel more secure." The simulations indicated that a 50% increase in troop strength was optimal, though a 25% increase would have been sufficient to capture the support of "neutral Iraqis". It also determined that due to Iraqi perceptions, the use of United Nations peacekeepers in place of US or coalition forces could achieve the same results with a smaller troop increase. These analyses were "performed and briefed to senior government decisionmakers well in advance of events."

==== Iraq Study Group Report ====
On December 6, 2006, the Iraq Study Group presented their report, which recommended both external and internal approaches for achieving positive progress in Iraq. Among other approaches, the report suggested that the "United States should significantly increase the number of U.S. military personnel, including combat troops, imbedded in and supporting Iraqi Army units." However, this language is not specifically included in any of the report's 79 recommendations. The ISG report mentioned a possible 10,000-20,000 troop increase for training but only until early 2008. Co-chairman James Baker said that since "events in Iraq could overtake what we recommend...[members] believe that decisions should be made by our national leaders with some urgency." Upon receiving the report Bush told the group "we will take every proposal seriously, and we will act in a timely fashion."

Later in the day White House spokesman Tony Snow told CNN's Larry King that Bush was comparing recommendations "by the Iraq Study Group with pending studies by the Joint Chiefs of Staff and National Security Council." Once the review was finished, Snow believed that the President would be able to "announce a new way forward" in Iraq by the end of the year.

==== State Department ====
On December 11, 2006, Bush met with Senior State Department advisers (including Secretary of State Condoleezza Rice) "on how to shape U.S. policy in Iraq as part of Bush's mission to come up with a new strategy." He reiterated his intent to communicate that strategy to the nation before Christmas 2006, and said "There is no question we've got to make sure that the State Department and the Defense Department – the efforts and their recommendations are closely coordinated, so that when I do speak to the American people, they will know that I've listened to all aspects of government and that the way forward is the way forward to achieve our objective: to succeed in Iraq."

==== Experts ====
Later on December 11, 2006, Bush met "with a group of Iraqi experts, including historians and former generals, in the Oval Office." The Washington Post reported that among the panel of experts were retired four-star generals Barry McCaffrey, Wayne A. Downing, and John Keane; along with academics Stephen Biddle and Eliot Cohen, who panned the recommendations of the Iraq Study Group. The Post went on to say "The group disagreed on the key issue of whether to send more troops to Iraq, with retired Gen. John M. Keane arguing that several thousand additional soldiers could be used to improve security in Baghdad, and others expressing doubt about that proposal." The group also suggested Bush change personnel in his national security team. One panel member reported that "All of us said they have failed, that you need a new team." The President thanked the panel and told reporters "I appreciate the advice I got from those folks in the field. And that advice is ... an important component of putting together a new way forward in Iraq."

The CIA's top counterinsurgency experts conducted an assessment that found the presence of US forces was key to stability. Brett H. McGurk added that "when we have a presence we are able to help resolve local disputes before they get out of control, police illegal conduct by Iraqi forces, and ultimately help the Iraqis develop their own patterns of interaction."

==== Joint Chiefs ====
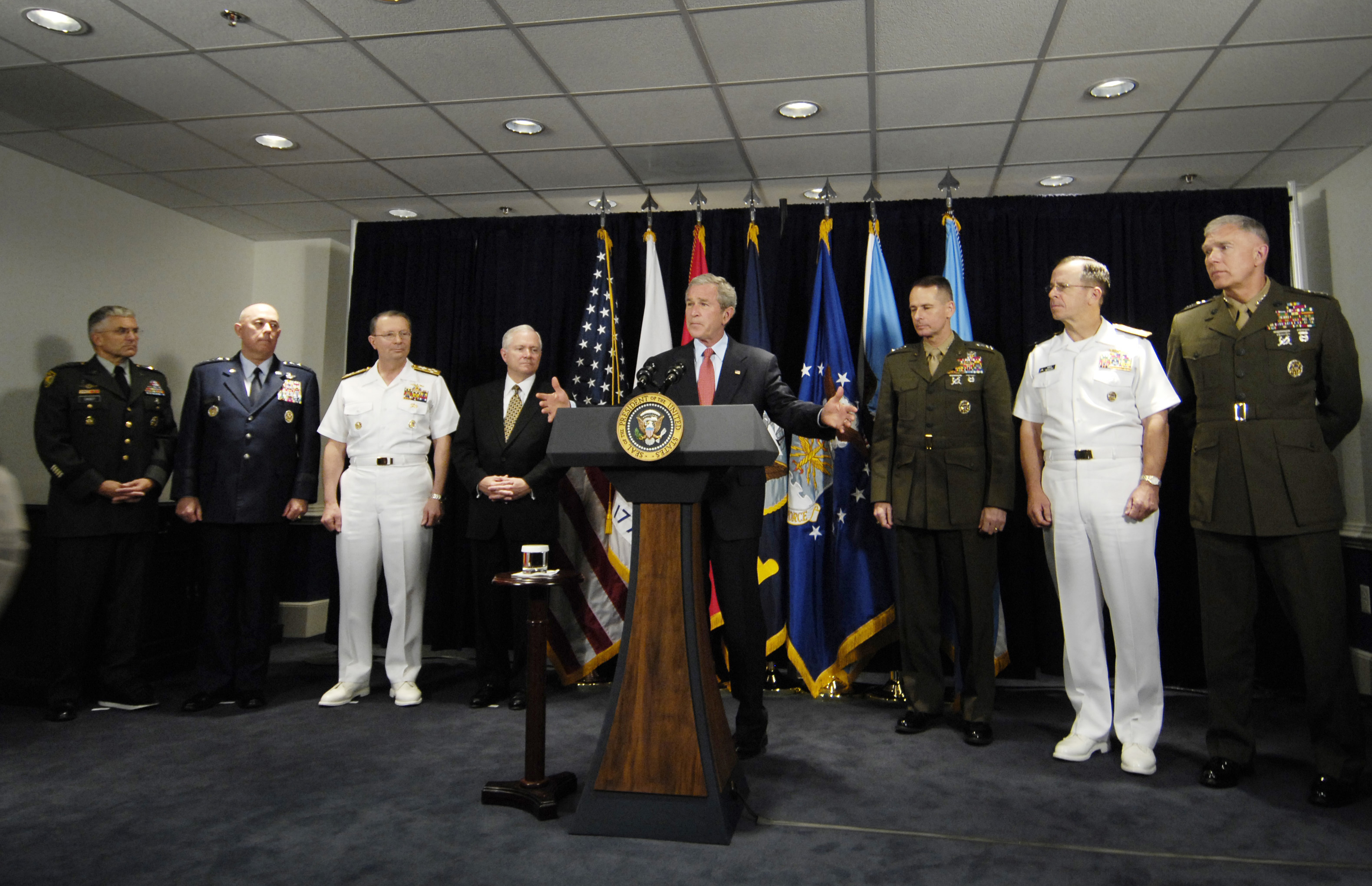
Bush makes a statement to reporters on the war in Iraq, following a meeting with senior US military leaders at the Pentagon, May 2007.

On December 13, 2006, Bush and Vice President Dick Cheney met with the members of the Joint Chiefs of Staff for "more than an hour," discussing different military options for Iraq. While "no dramatic proposals" were put forward, "a pragmatic assessment of what can and cannot be done by the military" was offered.

They did "not favor adding significant numbers of troops to Iraq" but saw "strengthening the Iraqi army as pivotal to achieving some degree of stability." They pressed for "greater U.S. effort on economic reconstruction and political reconciliation." They stressed the need for "employment programs, reconstruction and political reconciliation ... [as] key to pulling young men from the burgeoning militias." They said there was "no purely military solution for Iraq" and "without major progress on the political and economic fronts, the U.S. intervention is simply buying time." They also urged "that any new strategy be sensitive to regional context, particularly the impact of political or military decisions." They fear that throwing too much support to the Shiite majority may lead Sunni nations in the region to step up support of Sunni insurgents, and that a crackdown on Iraq's largest Shiite militia, the Mahdi army, may instigate more interference by Iran.

==== Chiarelli plan ====
General George William Casey Jr., the top US commander in Iraq, was reported to be "reviewing a plan to redefine the American military mission there: U.S. troops would be pulled out of Iraqi cities and consolidated at a handful of U.S. bases while day-to-day combat duty would be turned over to the Iraqi army." It was said that he was "still considering whether to request more troops, possibly as part of an expanded training mission to help strengthen the Iraqi army." These options were laid out by the outgoing US ground commander, Lt. Gen. Peter W. Chiarelli. Under the Chiarelli plan "the military would shift about half of its 15 combat brigades away from battling insurgents and sectarian violence and into training Iraqi security forces as soon as the spring of 2007. ... About 4,000 U.S. troops are now serving on 11-person military training teams embedded with Iraqi forces. The new plan would add 30 troops to each team, allowing them to provide supervision and mentoring down to the level of Iraqi army companies. ... the remaining seven to eight brigades of U.S. combat forces would focus on three core missions: striking al-Qaeda, strengthening security along Iraq's borders, and protecting major highways and other routes to ensure U.S. forces freedom of movement in Iraq. ... The plan would not allow for any major reduction in U.S. troops in Iraq over the next year – nor would it call for any surge in troops". Military spokesman Maj. Gen. William Caldwell said that "In northern and western Iraq, U.S. commanders are already moving troops out of combat missions to place them as advisers with lower-level Iraqi army units."

The Chiefs expressed "concern about the erosion of the U.S. military's ability to deal with other crises around the world because of the heavy commitment in Iraq and the stress on troops and equipment". They told Bush that there was "significantly increased risk to readiness in the event of a new emergency".

Speaking to reporters afterward Bush said "Our military cannot do this job alone. Our military needs a political strategy that is effective." He also stressed his ongoing commitment to securing Iraq, saying "If we lose our nerve, if we're not steadfast in our determination to help the Iraqi government succeed, we will be handing Iraq over to an enemy that would do us harm." When pressed for when he would announce his new way forward, he said he would not be "rushed" into a decision and was still reviewing his options.

==== December 14 comments ====
On December 14, 2006, when pressed by reporters for more information on his thinking on the matter Bush said "I am listening to a lot of advice to develop a strategy to help you succeed, a lot of consultations. I will be delivering my plans after a long deliberation, after steady deliberation. I'm not going to be rushed into making a decision." He stated that he had heard some "interesting" ideas. He also said he heard some "ideas that would lead to defeat ... [and] I reject those ideas. Ideas such as leaving before the job is done. Ideas such as not helping this (Iraqi) government take the necessary and hard steps to be able to do its job." He said he wanted the incoming Defense Secretary Robert Gates "to have time to evaluate the situation" and come up with his own suggestions. That same day Iraqi President Jalal Talabani issued a written statement saying that he had received Bush's assurances that "he would make no decisions on his new Iraq strategy that would be 'against your interests' ... [and his pledge] to work with Prime Minister Nuri al-Maliki on his efforts to implement a Baghdad security plan". CNN reported that "Administration officials say Bush is 'not satisfied' with some of the information he has been getting and 'is asking people to get him more' information on various options in Iraq."

Though originally scheduled for late 2006, the announcement on "the new way forward" was delayed to give the President "more time" to gather information. Press secretary Tony Snow said the administration was hoping for the president to deliver the speech before Christmas, although he said the timing was not nailed down.

==== American Enterprise Institute surge support ====
This American Enterprise Institute surge study referenced is listed as having been posted December 14, and was called the "real Iraq Study Group report" by its author. The draft was presented on December 14 by Frederick Kagan, AEI, General Jack Keane, and Kenneth Pollack. AEI released its final report to the press on January 5, 2007, under the title "Iraq: A Turning Point (With Reports from Iraq from Senators John McCain and Joseph Lieberman)". The event description stated the following:

The study calls for a large and sustained surge of U.S. forces to secure and protect critical areas of Baghdad. Mr. Kagan directed the report in consultation with military and regional experts, including General Keane, former Afghanistan coalition commander Lieutenant General David Barno, and other officers involved with the successful operations of the 3rd Armored Cavalry Regiment in Tal Afar. An interim version of the report was released on December 14, 2006. At this event, Mr. Kagan and General Keane will present their final report, which outlines how the United States can win in Iraq and why victory is the only acceptable outcome.

Andrew Ross of the San Francisco Chronicle also connected Bush's strategy to this AEI report, writing "In addition to the changing of the military guard and moving ahead with the 'surge' option, President Bush's Iraq strategy involves more money for reconstruction, job creation, and for 'moderate Iraqi political parties as a means of building a centrist political coalition to support Prime Minister Nouri al-Maliki,' according to The Wall Street Journal. This more holistic approach – reportedly entitled 'The New Way Forward' – echoes in many ways," an AEI paper.

== Presentation ==
=== Pre-speech expectations ===
Bush was expected to announce a "surge" in forces that some sources say could be up to 20,000 troops. According to Reuters, "While Bush is to announce a complete overhaul of his Iraq policy, including economic and political components, the possibility of a troop increase has gained the most attention. Despite a divide on the issue, Bush in recent days has hinted toward a preference for increasing troop strength by saying he wanted to help Iraqis gain control of the security situation there. "One thing is for certain, I will want to make sure that the mission is clear and specific and can be accomplished," Bush said on Thursday when asked about a troop increase." In fact, Bush's proposed increase was 21,000 US troops, 4000 of which would be Marine Corps focused on Al Anbar Governorate while the others would be embedded into Iraqi units to provide security to Baghdad.

==== Prebuttals ====
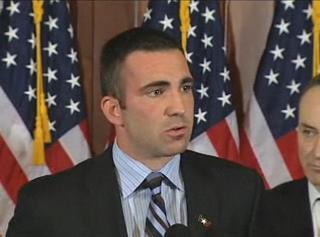
Jon Soltz speaking at the Democratic press conference.

Just before the 110th Congress convened on January 4 some Democrats said they planned to call Defense Secretary Robert Gates before the Senate Armed Services Committee "to explain, if not try to defend, the president's plan."

Prior to the speech, US Senator Jack Reed (D-RI), a member of the Armed Services Committee, held a press conference with former NATO Supreme Allied Commander General Wesley Clark and Jon Soltz, Senator Chuck Schumer (D-NY), Senator Patty Murray (D-WA) and together called on Bush "to listen to the advice of his generals and the American people and offer a new plan to change course in Iraq."

=== Plan announcement ===
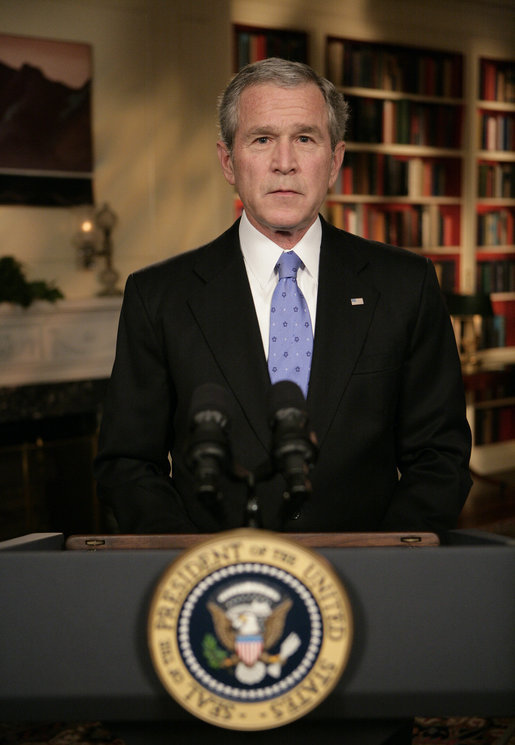
President George W. Bush announces the new strategy on Iraq from the White House Library, January 10, 2007.

In a nationally televised address on January 10, Bush stated "America will change our strategy to help the Iraqis carry out their campaign to put down sectarian violence and bring security to the people of Baghdad. This will require increasing American force levels. So I've committed more than 20,000 additional American troops to Iraq. The vast majority of them – five brigades – will be deployed to Baghdad".

On the same day of the speech, ABC News announced that ninety advance troops from the 82nd Airborne Division had already arrived in Baghdad.

=== 2007 State of the Union address ===
In advance of the State of the Union address, Bush gave several promotional speeches to Belo television and Sinclair television, suggesting that the surge "should be given a chance" and challenged critical lawmakers to offer an alternative.

On the night of Tuesday, January 23, the president had this to say on the troop increase in Iraq, outlining its purpose in supporting the Iraqi government's maintenance of control:

In order to make progress toward this goal, the Iraqi government must stop the sectarian violence in its capital. But the Iraqis are not yet ready to do this on their own. So we're deploying reinforcements of more than 20,000 additional soldiers and Marines to Iraq. The vast majority will go to Baghdad, where they will help Iraqi forces to clear and secure neighborhoods, and serve as advisers embedded in Iraqi Army units. With Iraqis in the lead, our forces will help secure the city by chasing down the terrorists, insurgents, and the roaming death squads. And in Anbar Province, where al Qaeda terrorists have gathered and local forces have begun showing a willingness to fight them, we're sending an additional 4,000 United States Marines, with orders to find the terrorists and clear them out. (Applause.) We didn't drive al Qaeda out of their safe haven in Afghanistan only to let them set up a new safe haven in a free Iraq.

== Response ==
The substance of the debate that followed the speech reflected "widespread disagreement with the Bush administration over its proposed solution, and growing skepticism that the United States made the right decision in going to war in the first place". Some issues of contention were divisions over the advisability of committing more troops versus complete withdrawal, the 'winnability' of the Iraq War regardless of a surge, and framing of the issue.

=== Supporters ===
The New York Times reported that former Massachusetts Governor Mitt Romney and former New York City Mayor Rudolph Giuliani backed Bush on the troop increase. McCain did the same, saying on January 12 that "The presence of additional coalition forces would allow the Iraqi government to do what it cannot accomplish today on its own: impose its rule throughout the country."

=== Opponents ===
Immediately following Bush's January 10 speech announcing the plan, Democratic politicians, including Ted Kennedy, Harry Reid and Dennis Kucinich, called on Congress to reject the surge. Senator Dick Durbin issued the Democratic response which called upon Iraqis to "disband the militias and death squads." On January 18, Xinhua News Agency reported that "whitehouse hopefuls" Sens. Hillary Clinton, D-N.Y., Barack Obama, D-Ill., Chris Dodd, D-Conn., Joe Biden, D-Del, and Sam Brownback, R-Kansas, all voiced their discontent January 13 with the course of events in Iraq.

On January 17, Moveon.org released an ad that identified the surge strategy as "McCain's idea". The New York Times reported that presidential candidate John Edwards had "taken to referring to the administration proposal as 'the McCain Doctrine.'"

On January 18, the Los Angeles Times released a Bloomberg poll that said 60 percent of those polled opposed the troop surge, 51 percent wanted Congress to try to block Bush from sending more soldiers, and 65 percent disapproved of the president's handling of the war. Meanwhile, a Fox News Poll reported that 59 percent to 36 percent, Americans opposed sending more US troops to Iraq.

==== Congress ====
On January 16, Nebraska Republican Chuck Hagel, Delaware Democrat Joe Biden (Senate Foreign Relations Committee chair), and Michigan Democrat Carl Levin (Armed Services Committee chair) co-sponsored a non-binding resolution that said it was "not in the national interest of the United States to deepen its military involvement in Iraq."

House Speaker Nancy Pelosi said Democrats in her chamber would back a non-binding resolution "declaring that President Bush's decision to send additional troops to Iraq is 'not in the national interest of the United States.'" The Washington Times reported Pelosi "has made clear her disdain for the 'surge' proposal" since before Bush unveiled it last week, but her latest remarks "were her first indication of the language that she will want the House to approve."

After three days of debate, on February 16, 2007, the House of Representatives passed House Concurrent Resolution (HCR) 63 on a vote of 246 to 182. The resolution stated:

1. Congress and the American people will continue to support and protect the members of the United States Armed Forces who are serving or who have served bravely and honorably in Iraq; and
2. Congress disapproves of the decision of President George W. Bush announced on January 10, 2007, to deploy more than 20,000 additional United States combat troops to Iraq.

Following passage in the House, Senate Majority Leader Harry Reid (D-NV) convened an unusual Saturday session of the Senate on February 17, 2007, to consider an identically worded resolution. However, the measure was tabled when a cloture motion failed on a 56–34 vote (four votes short of the 60 votes needed to end debate).

Pelosi announced that despite opposition to the surge, she would not push for blocking congressional funding for additional troops.

== Implementation ==
=== Personnel changes ===
In conjunction with the surge, the Bush administration implemented several personnel changes, as follows:

- CENTCOM commander – Navy Admiral William J. Fallon replaced General John Abizaid as CENTCOM commander
- Commander of Multinational Force Iraq – counter-insurgency expert General David Petraeus replaced General George Casey as Commander of Multinational Force Iraq.
- US Ambassador to Iraq and ambassador to the United Nations – Bush announced the appointment of US diplomat Ryan C. Crocker as the new ambassador to Iraq. Zalmay Khalilzad, then US ambassador to Iraq, was nominated to replace Alejandro Daniel Wolff as the US Ambassador to the United Nations. Khalilzad was confirmed by the Senate, he was the first Muslim to serve in the position, and he was the highest serving Muslim-American official in the US government.
- US National Intelligence Director – John Negroponte resigned and became Deputy Secretary of State. Retired Admiral John M. McConnell took his place.
- White House Counsel– Harriet Miers stepped down. She was replaced by Fred Fielding.

=== Units deployed ===
The six US Army brigades committed to Iraq as part of the surge were

1. 2nd Brigade, 82nd Airborne Division (Infantry): 3,447 troops. Deployed to Baghdad, January 2007
2. 4th Brigade, 1st Infantry Division (Infantry): 3,447 troops. Deployed to Baghdad, February 2007
3. 3rd Brigade, 3rd Infantry Division (Heavy): 3,784 troops. Deployed to southern Baghdad Belts, March 2007
4. 4th Brigade, 2nd Infantry Division (Stryker): 3,921 troops. Deployed to Diyala Governorate, April 2007
5. 2nd Brigade, 3rd Infantry Division (Heavy): 3,784 troops. Deployed to the southeast of Baghdad, May 2007
6. 1st Brigade, 10th Mountain Division (Light), September 2007 Deployed to Kirkuk

This brought the number of US brigades in Iraq from 15 to 20. Additionally, 4,000 Marines in Al Anbar had their 7-month tour extended. These included Marines from the 15th Marine Expeditionary Unit, 31st Marine Expeditionary Unit, the 2nd Battalion 4th Marines, the 1st Battalion 6th Marines and the 3rd Battalion, 4th Marines. Most of the 150,000 Army personnel had their 12-month tours extended as well. By July, 2007, the percentage of the mobilized Army deployed to Iraq and Afghanistan was almost 30%; the percentage of the mobilized Marine Corps deployed to Iraq and Afghanistan was 13.5%.

=== Operations ===
The plan began with a major operation to secure Baghdad, codenamed Operation Fardh al-Qanoon (Operation Imposing Law), which was launched in February 2007. However, only in mid-June 2007, with the full deployment of the 28,000 additional US troops, could major counter-insurgency efforts get fully under way. Operation Phantom Thunder was launched throughout Iraq on June 16, with a number of subordinate operations targeting insurgents in Diyala and Al Anbar Governorates and the southern Baghdad Belts. The additional surge troops also participated in Operation Phantom Strike and Operation Phantom Phoenix, named after the III "Phantom" Corps which was the major US unit in Iraq throughout 2007.

=== Counterinsurgency strategy ===
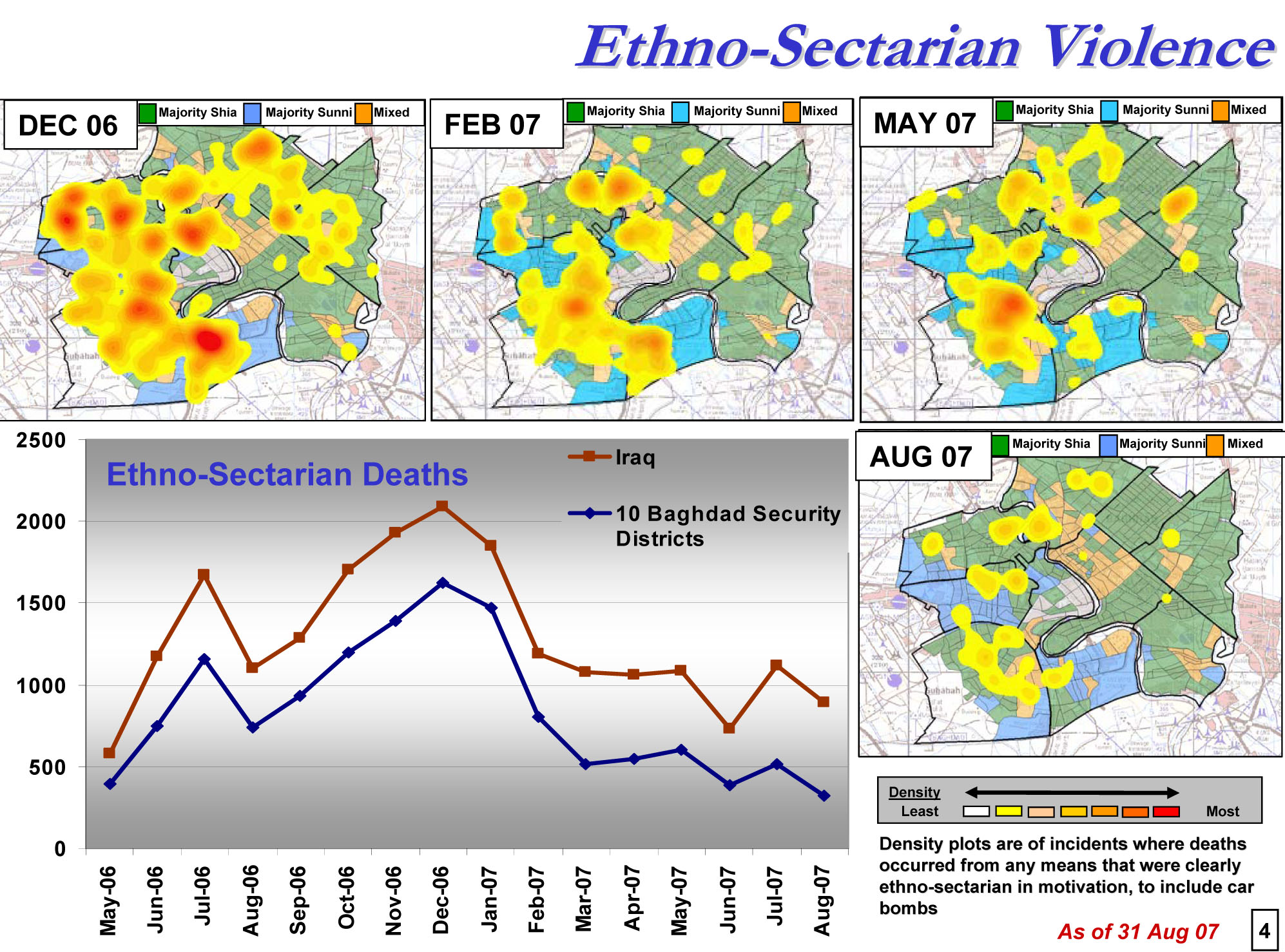
Success of the counterinsurgency strategy measured in decrease of ethno-sectarian violence.

Counterinsurgency strategy in Iraq changed significantly under the command of General Petraeus since the 2007 troop surge began. The newer approach attempted to win the hearts and minds of the Iraqi people through building relationships, preventing civilian casualties and compromising with and even hiring some former enemies. The new strategy was population-centric in that it focused in protecting the population rather than killing insurgents. In implementing this strategy, Petraeus used experience gained while commanding the 101st Airborne Division in Mosul in 2003. He also explained these ideas extensively in Field Manual 3-24: Counterinsurgency, which he assisted in the writing of while serving as the Commanding General of Fort Leavenworth, Kansas, and the US Army Combined Arms Center (CAC) located there.

Instead of seeing every Iraqi as a potential enemy, COIN strategy focused on building relationships and getting cooperation from the Iraqis against Al Qaeda and minimizing the number of enemies for US forces. The belief was that maintaining a long-term presence of troops in a community improves security and allows for relationships and trust to develop between the locals and the US military. Civilian casualties are minimized by carefully measured use of force. This means less bombing and overwhelming fire-power, and more soldiers using restraint and even sometimes taking more risk in the process.

Another method of gaining cooperation is by paying locals, including former insurgents, to work as local security forces. Former Sunni insurgents have been hired by the US military to stop cooperating with Al Qaeda and to start fighting against them. To implement this strategy, troops were concentrated in the Baghdad area (at the time, Baghdad accounted for 50% of all the violence in Iraq). Whereas in the past, Coalition forces isolated themselves from Iraqis by living in large forward operating bases far from population centers, troops during the surge lived among the Iraqis, operating from joint security stations (JSSs) located within Baghdad itself and shared with Iraqi security forces. Coalition units were permanently assigned to a given area so that they could build long-term relationships with the local Iraqi population and security forces.

However, opponents of the occupation of Iraq, such as retired U.S. Army officer David Hackworth, when asked whether he thought the British military was better at interacting with the Iraqi public than American forces, said "They were very good at lining up local folks to do the job like operating the sewers and turning on the electricity. Far better than us – we are heavy-handed, and in Iraq we don't understand the people and the culture. Thus we did not immediately employ locals in police and military activities to get them to build and stabilize their nation." CNN correspondent Michael Ware, who reported from Iraq since prior to the 2003 invasion, had a similarly dim view of the Coalition occupation, saying that "there will be very much mixed reaction in Iraq" to a long-term U.S. troop presence, adding that "what's the point and will it be worth it?" Ware contended that occupation could "ferment further resentment" towards the U.S.

== Results ==
=== Security situation ===
Hostile and Non-Hostile Deaths.

For the first few months of the surge, violence increased. However, by the fall of 2007, the security situation had improved significantly. U.S. military deaths fell from a peak of 126 in May 2007 to 23 in December, and during the period after the surge (June 2008 to June 2011), the monthly average was less than 11. In May 2007, over 1,700 Iraqi civilians were killed, compared to approximately 500 in December. The average from June 2008 to June 2011 was approximately 200.

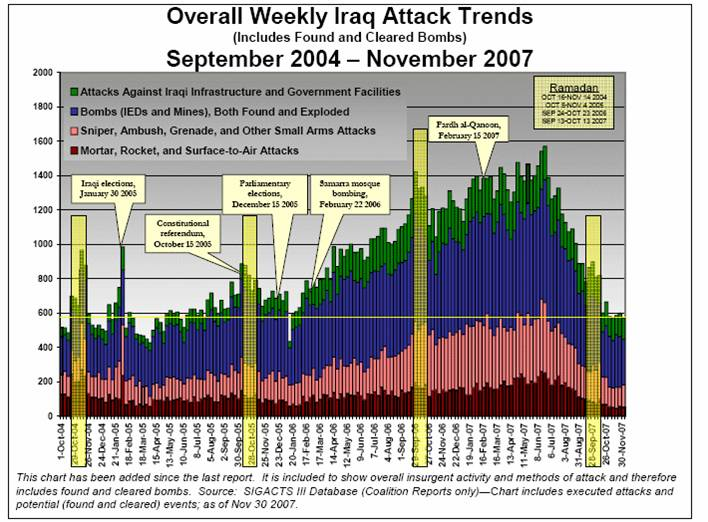
Significant attack trends.

On September 10, 2007, David Petraeus delivered his part of the Report to Congress on the Situation in Iraq. He concluded that "the military objectives of the surge are, in large measure, being met." He cited recent consistent declines in security incidents, which he attributed to recent blows dealt against Al-Qaeda in Iraq during the surge. He added that "we have also disrupted Shia militia extremists, capturing the head and numerous other leaders of the Iranian-supported Special Groups, along with a senior Lebanese Hezbollah operative supporting Iran's activities in Iraq." He argued that Coalition and Iraqi operations had drastically reduced ethno-sectarian violence in the country, though he stated that the gains were not entirely even. He recommended a gradual drawdown of US forces in Iraq with a goal of reaching pre-surge troop levels by July 2008 and stated that further withdraws would be "premature".

Sectarian violence.

While Petraeus credited the surge for the decrease in violence, the decrease also closely corresponded with a ceasefire order given by Iraqi political leader Muqtada al-Sadr on August 29, 2007. Al-Sadr's order, to stand down for six months, was distributed to his loyalists following the deaths of more than 50 Shia Muslim pilgrims during fighting in Karbala the day earlier.

Michael E. O'Hanlon and Jason H. Campbell of the Brookings Institution stated on December 22, 2007, that Iraq's security environment had reached its best levels since early 2004 and credited Petraeus' strategy for the improvement. CNN stated that month that the monthly death rate for US troops in Iraq had hit its second lowest point during the entire course of the war. Military representatives attributed the successful reduction of violence and casualties directly to the troop surge. At the same time, the Iraqi Ministry of Interior reported similar reductions for civilian deaths.

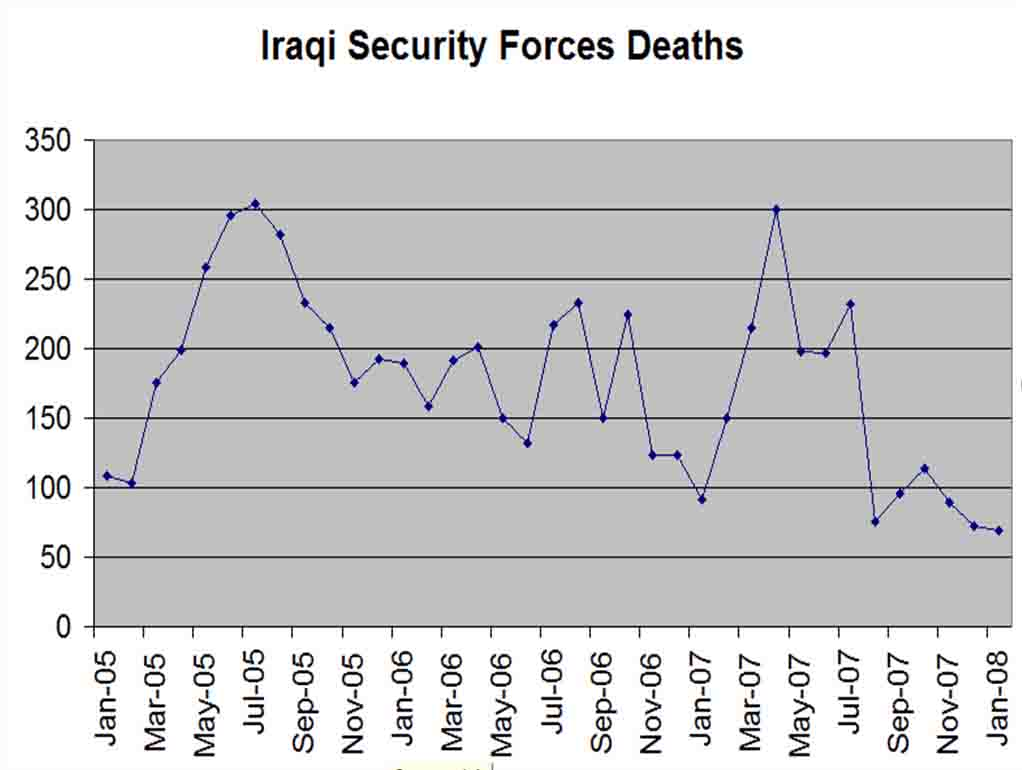
Iraqi Security Force deaths.

However, on September 6, 2007, a report by an independent military commission headed by General James Jones found that the decrease in violence may have been due to areas being overrun by either Shias or Sunnis. In addition, in August 2007, the International Organization for Migration and the Iraqi Red Crescent Organization indicated that more Iraqis had fled since the troop increase.

On February 16, 2008, Iraqi Defense Minister Abdel Qader Jassim Mohammed told reporters that the surge was "working very well" and that Iraq has a "pressing" need for troops to stay to secure Iraqi borders. He stated that "Results for 2007 prove that – Baghdad is good now".

In June 2008, the US Department of Defense reported that "the security, political and economic trends in Iraq continue to be positive; however, they remain fragile, reversible and uneven."

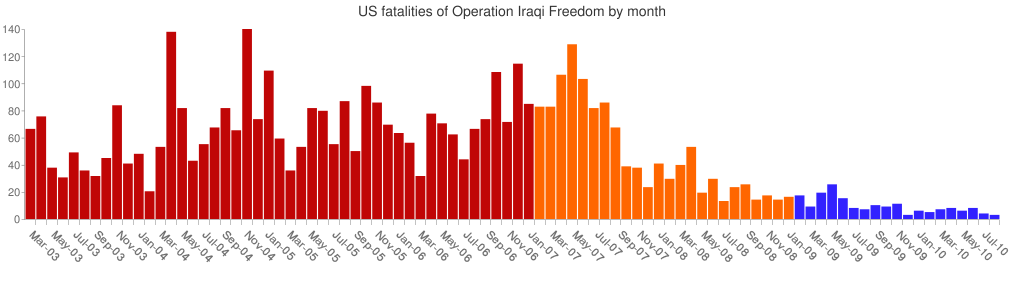
US troop fatalities in Iraq by month, the orange and blue months being post-troop surge.

In the month of July, 2008, US forces lost only 13 soldiers, the lowest number of casualties sustained by US troops in one month since the invasion of Iraq in 2003. Also, a report by the US embassy in Baghdad, given to Congress in May 2008, and published July 1, stated that the Iraqi government had met 15 of the 18 political benchmarks set out for them.

The Surge allowed troops to have more control over urban areas previously held by insurgents allowing for an overall slowdown of the fighting.

=== Political system and economy ===
The US Government Accountability Office (GAO) reported on September 2, 2007, that the Iraqi government had only met three of the eighteen benchmarks created by the US Congress in June 2006. Two other government reports measuring progress in Iraq, a National Intelligence Estimate and an independent commission assessment by retired general James L. Jones, were published for Congress in fall 2007. USA Today compared the findings. The New York Times also did so. Another GAO report stated that the Iraqi Government did not meet 11 of the 18 benchmark measures as of August 30, 2007. On September 14, a White House survey reported "satisfactory" progress on 9 of the 18 benchmarks.

Lionel Beehner of the nonpartisan Council of Foreign Relations has called the benchmarks "vague because the metrics to measure them are imprecise." The New York Times stated on May 13 that "Nobody in Washington seems to agree on what progress actually means – or how, precisely, it might be measured." General David Petraeus, commander of the Multinational force in Iraq, has stated that his recommendations on troop strength are not dependent on the Iraqi government's ability to meet the benchmarks.

On December 2, 2007, the Sunni Arab Iraqi Accord Front called for the end to their boycott of the Iraq Parliament. On January 20, 2008, Iraq's parliament passed a law to let members of the Ba'ath party return to public life, a major US congressional benchmark for the success of Iraqi government. That month, the International Monetary Fund (IMF) stated that Iraq's economy would expand significantly from the previous year's lows. Mohsin Khan, the IMF's director for the Middle East, said Iraqi oil production was forecast to climb by 200,000 barrels per day (32,000 m^{3}/d) to 2.2 million barrels per day (350,000 m^{3}/d) in 2008. Also reported by the IMF was that Iraq's gross domestic product growth is expected to jump significantly up to over 7 percent, in 2008 and 2009, from just 1.3 percent in 2007

On December 22, 2007, Michael E. O'Hanlon and Jason H. Campbell of the Brookings Institution called Iraq's economy and political system to be "only marginally better than a year ago". The envoy to Iraq reported on the dialogue between the Sunni and Shia communities and praised the government's work in late 2007. The envoy, Staffan de Mistura, said he would present a positive picture of progress in Iraq in a report to the UN Security Council despite earlier serious misgivings. He said, "At the beginning of [2007]... we were genuinely concerned by the lack of progress on national dialogue, today that has substantially changed. It has changed our mind from being worried or from being pessimistic." The UN report would, he said, "compliment" Iraq's government on its work at fostering reconciliation.

In January 2008, Council of Foreign Relations fellow Michael E. O'Hanlon stated that "Overall, Iraq's political system probably merits a grade of roughly C for its performance over the last 12 months." He also stated that "the pace of progress is finally picking up."

On February 13, 2008, the Iraqi parliament passed three pieces of legislation that were considered contentious. The three measures were an amnesty law, a law that defines the scope of provincial powers, and the budget for 2008. The amnesty law was one of the benchmarks set by Bush. The provincial powers law includes a provision for provincial elections, another key benchmark. And the budget should pave the way for the creation of up to 700,000 new jobs for Iraqis.

USA Today stated on February 17, 2008, that US Ambassador to Iraq Ryan Crocker "may be hard-pressed to argue that Iraqis have met political benchmarks Congress sought" and contrasted the political progress with the recent military progress.

=== Interpretation of results ===
Whether the surge led to the improvement in Iraqi security, or other factors caused it, is disputed by some. Council of Foreign Relations fellow Noah Feldman has remarked that:

These questions can be stated with some precision. They begin with the issue of how to interpret the comparative reduction in violence since the surge of United States troops began nearly a year ago. Does the decrease show that more troops on the ground were necessary to impose effective control over territory and persuade insurgents to back down? Or is the reduced violence a sign instead that the prospect of imminent United States withdrawal has made Iraqis more hesitant to foment a civil war from which the United States will not save them? Whatever the answer, the practical consequences are huge: either we keep troop levels relatively stable, drawing down slowly while we consolidate increasing stability, or we accelerate withdrawal to underscore our seriousness about leaving.

==== Support ====
Both critics of the surge and independent news services have stated that the conventional wisdom in the United States media is that the surge 'worked'. Many Democratic political leaders have acknowledged the same.

In June 2008, correspondents on Late Edition with Wolf Blitzer stated that "few would argue about the success of the so-called surge in Iraq". Time has stated that "the surge is a fragile and limited success, an operation that has helped stabilize the capital and its surroundings." The New York Times has stated that "The surge, clearly, has worked, at least for now. ... The result, now visible in the streets, is a calm unlike any the country has seen since the American invasion".

Peter Mansoor, General Petraeus's executive officer and author of the Baghdad at Sunrise: A Brigade Commander's War in Iraq, stated in an August 2008 The Washington Post op-ed that "The Iraq war is not over, but our war effort is on a firmer foundation... The surge has created the space and time for the competition for power and resources in Iraq to play out in the political realm, with words instead of bombs." Blogger and independent reporter Michael Yon, who has been embedded with the troops in Iraq for years, had suggested the surge strategy before it was formalized. In his book, Moment of Truth in Iraq, Yon argued that Petraeus had turned defeat into victory in Iraq and that the surge had succeeded. In July 2008, Yon stated in a New York Daily News editorial that "'The war in Iraq is over ... the Iraqi people won."

Historian Larry Schweikart argued in his book America's Victories: Why the U.S. Wins Wars, that the surge's success, in part, came from the incredible casualties the US military inflicted on al-Qaeda in Iraq and on the "insurgents" from 2003 to 2006---some 40,000 killed, about 200,000 wounded, 20,000 captured, and nearly 10,000 deserted. He has stated that those levels of attrition on an enemy the estimated size of al-Qaeda were substantial and deeply damaging, not only to the terrorists' efforts in Iraq, but had the effect of depleting them worldwide. Moreover, Schweikart argued, virtually all estimates of enemy casualties were severely under-counted (as are all numbers of guerilla casualties) given the inability to identify bodies which were completely annihilated by explosives or to count carcasses dragged away, as well as how many would die later after attempted medical treatment by other Al Queda sympathizers.

On September 11, 2014, Senator John McCain argued on CNN's At This Hour that the surge was a victory, that it had fulfilled the goal of providing substantial security and stability to the Iraqi government, and that the withdrawal of troops after the surge had resulted in growing terrorist operations and the emergence of ISIS in Iraq. McCain said, "We had it won, thanks to the surge. It was won. The victory was there. All we needed was a force behind to provide support, not to engage in combat, but to supply support, logistics, intelligence. And, by the way, the Korean War we left troops behind; Bosnia, we left troops behind, not to fight, but be for a stabilizing force."

==== Opposition ====
Journalist Patrick Cockburn has stated that the reduction in violence was a direct result of ethnic cleansing by the Shia-led Iraqi government and Shia militias against Sunnis. He has stated that "the battle for Baghdad in 2006-07 was won by the Shia, who now control three-quarters of the capital. These demographic changes appear permanent; Sunnis who try to get their houses back face assassination." UCLA professor of geography John Agnew released a study in mid-September 2008 stating that violence has declined in Baghdad "because of intercommunal violence that reached a climax as the surge was beginning," said that "By the launch of the surge, many of the targets of conflict had either been killed or fled the country, and they turned off the lights when they left."

Washington Post reporter Bob Woodward has interviewed US government sources according to whom the US "surge" was not the primary reason for the drop in violence in 2007–2008. Instead, according to his view, the reduction of violence was due to new covert techniques by US military and intelligence officials to find, target and kill insurgents.

Some, such as then Speaker of the House Nancy Pelosi, have credited the Iranian government for all or part of the reduction in violence. Pelosi stated in May 2008 that "some of the success of the surge is that the goodwill of the Iranians-they decided in Basra when the fighting would end, they negotiated that cessation of hostilities-the Iranians." Cockburn has also stated that the Iranians played the major role.

Other commentators have pointed to the Sunni Awakening (which started in 2005) as the most important reason for the decline in Iraqi violence. David Kilcullen, General Petraeus's counterinsurgency and troop surge adviser, believes that "the tribal revolt was arguably the most significant change in the Iraqi operating environment in several years."

One article mentions that "Currently, the dominant U.S presence in Iraq allows the rest of the world to avoid responsibility for stability in and around Iraq even as everyone realizes the stakes involved". In addition "A plan to draw down U.S forces would therefore contribute to the success of a larger diplomatic strategy, prompting Middle Eastern states, European governments, and the UN to be more constructive and proactive in working to salvage stability in the Persian Gulf"

On April 20, 2007, four months after the surge went into effect, Senator Harry Reid made a statement on the floor of the US Senate that the US had already lost the war in Iraq and that the surge would accomplish nothing, stating "I believe myself that the secretary of state, secretary of defense and – you have to make your own decisions as to what the president knows – (know) this war is lost and the surge is not accomplishing anything as indicated by the extreme violence in Iraq yesterday."

Congressional Democrats believed military progress has been made in Iraq but that the political progress that President Bush gave as the primary reason for the surge has not occurred. They continued to call for a withdrawal of American troops. In February 2008, Speaker of the House Nancy Pelosi told reporters that "God knows, anytime our military men and women go into a military exercise, we want them to succeed, and they did. The politics did not follow. So they can paint whatever picture they want on it; the goal has not been accomplished. The tragedies, the casualties continue. We are going in the wrong direction in Iraq." Presidential candidate Hillary Clinton, having already voted to support Petraeus, now stated on Fox News Sunday that month that "the so-called surge was designed to give the Iraqi government the space and time to make the tough decisions that only the Iraqis can make for themselves. ... And I think that putting forward a very clear objective of beginning to withdraw our troops is the best way to get the Iraqis to take responsibility."

==== Public opinion ====
An early February 2008 Gallup Poll found that 43% of Americans thought the troop increase was "making the situation there better". A CNN poll conducted during the same period found that 52% thought that US forces were "making progress in improving conditions in Iraq and bringing an end to the violence in that country" while 45% disagree. A poll released by the Pew Research Center on the same day found that 48% of those polled believed the war to be going well, up from 30% a year earlier, with a similar number supporting keeping troops in Iraq "until the situation has stabilized". A majority still believed the war to be a wrong decision in the first place. A commentary on the poll by National Public Radio called some of its results a "sign that the troop surge is being seen as successful." Nonetheless, an Opinion Research Corporation poll conducted in June 2008 found that 68% of Americans were opposed to the war in Iraq and that 64% of Americans wanted to see the next President remove most troops from Iraq within a few months of taking office. A summer 2008 CBS News poll found that 46% thought it improved the situation in Iraq while 11% thought it made it worse and 32% thought it had no impact.

A March 2008 poll of Iraq found that 42% of Iraqis called attacks on US forces acceptable and that only 4% of Iraqis believed that US forces were responsible for the drop in violence. The poll also found that 61% believed that the presence of US troops in Iraq was actually worsening the security situation. In July 2008, Iraqi Prime Minister Nuri Al-Maliki and Iraqi National security advisor Muwaffaq Al-Rubaie both sought a timetable for the withdrawal of foreign troops.

A CNN/Opinion Research Corporation Poll conducted September 1–2, 2010, revisited this question "As you may know, the US. sent 20,000 combat troops to Iraq in 2007 in what was called a surge. Based on what you have read or heard, do you think that surge of U.S. troops to Iraq was a success or a failure?" 60% responded as success, 33% failure and 7% depends or unsure.

== See also ==
- 110th United States Congress
- 2006 United States general elections
- 2007 in Iraq
- 2007 State of the Union address
- American Enterprise Institute
- Iraq insurgency
- Iraq Study Group
- Iraq withdrawal benchmarks
- July 12, 2007, Baghdad airstrike associated with WikiLeaks in 2010
- Kerry–Feingold Amendment
- Report to Congress on the Situation in Iraq
- Special Activities Division
- Strategic reset
- Timeline of the Iraq War troop surge of 2007
