= Political positions of Nancy Pelosi =

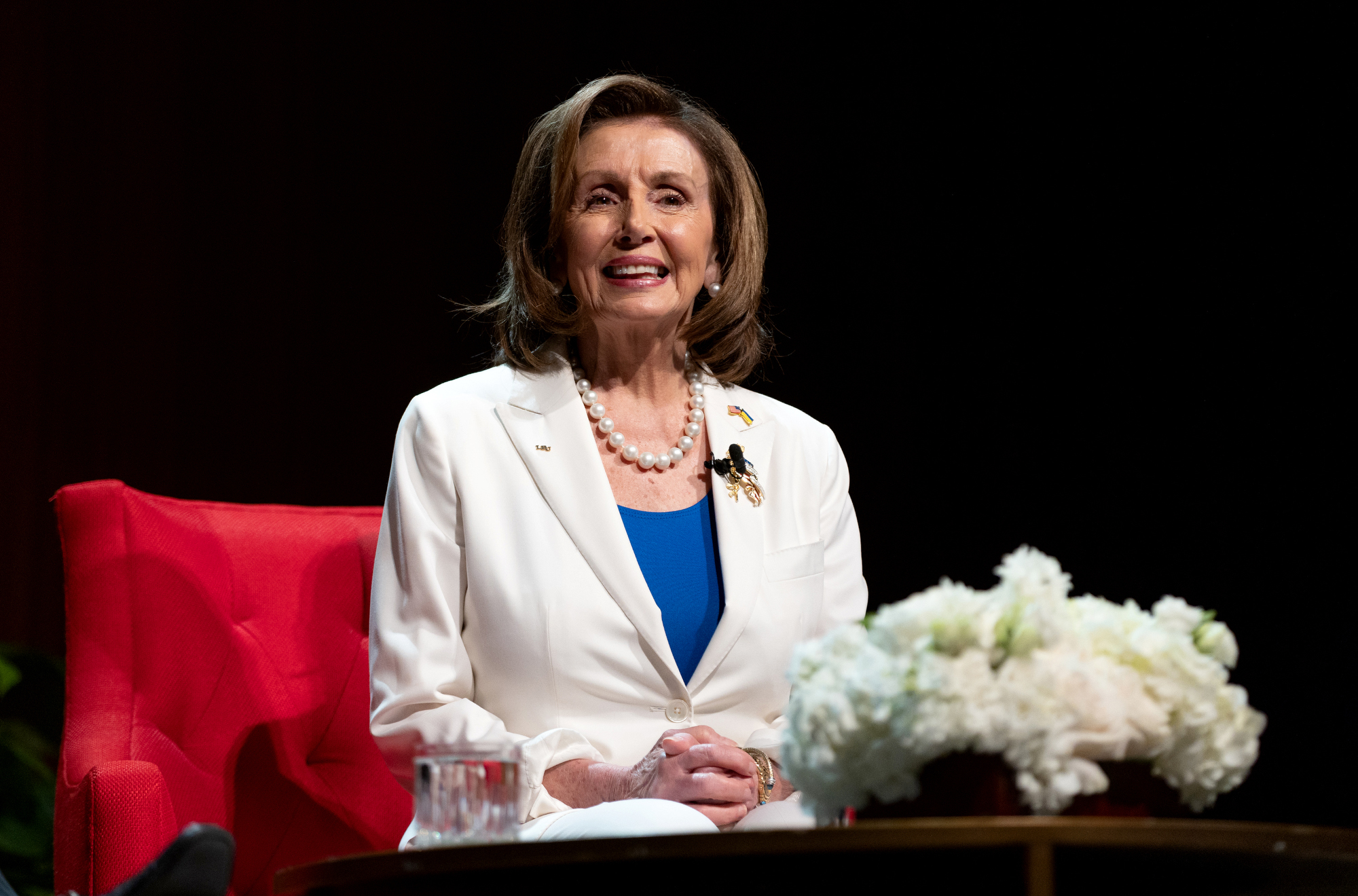
Speaker Pelosi delivering a speech at the LBJ Presidential Library in 2022

Nancy Pelosi is an American politician who served as the 52nd speaker of the House of Representatives. She led the House Democrats from 2003 to 2023. Pelosi was a founding member of the Congressional Progressive Caucus, which she left in 2003 after being elected House minority leader. She is still widely considered a liberal.

== Civil liberties and human rights ==
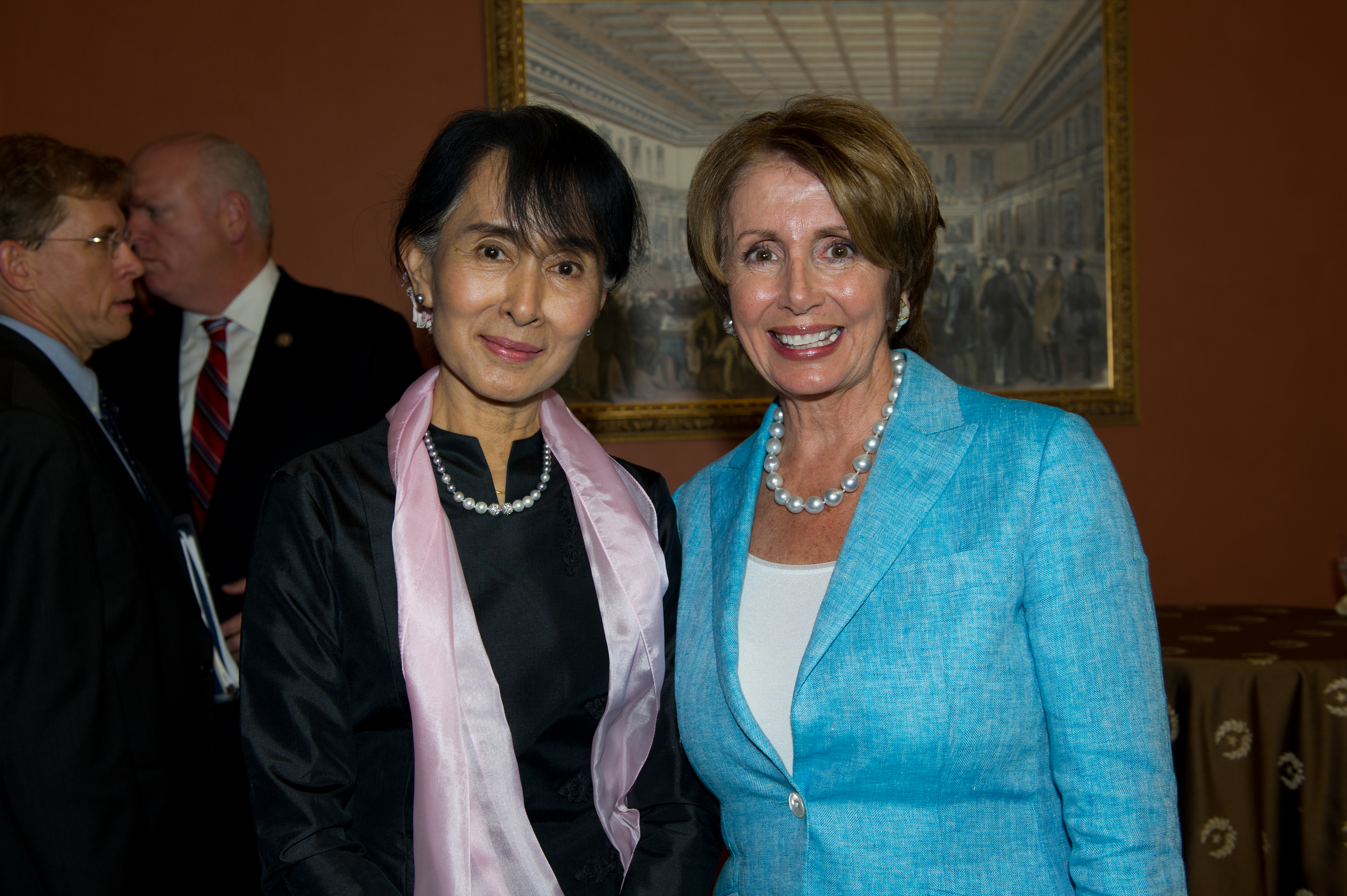
Pelosi with Aung San Suu Kyi, Myanmar's pro-democracy leader, at a Congressional Gold Medal ceremony in 2012

In 2001, she voted in favor of the USA Patriot Act, but voted against reauthorization of certain provisions in 2005. She voted against a Constitutional amendment banning flag-burning.

=== Immigration ===
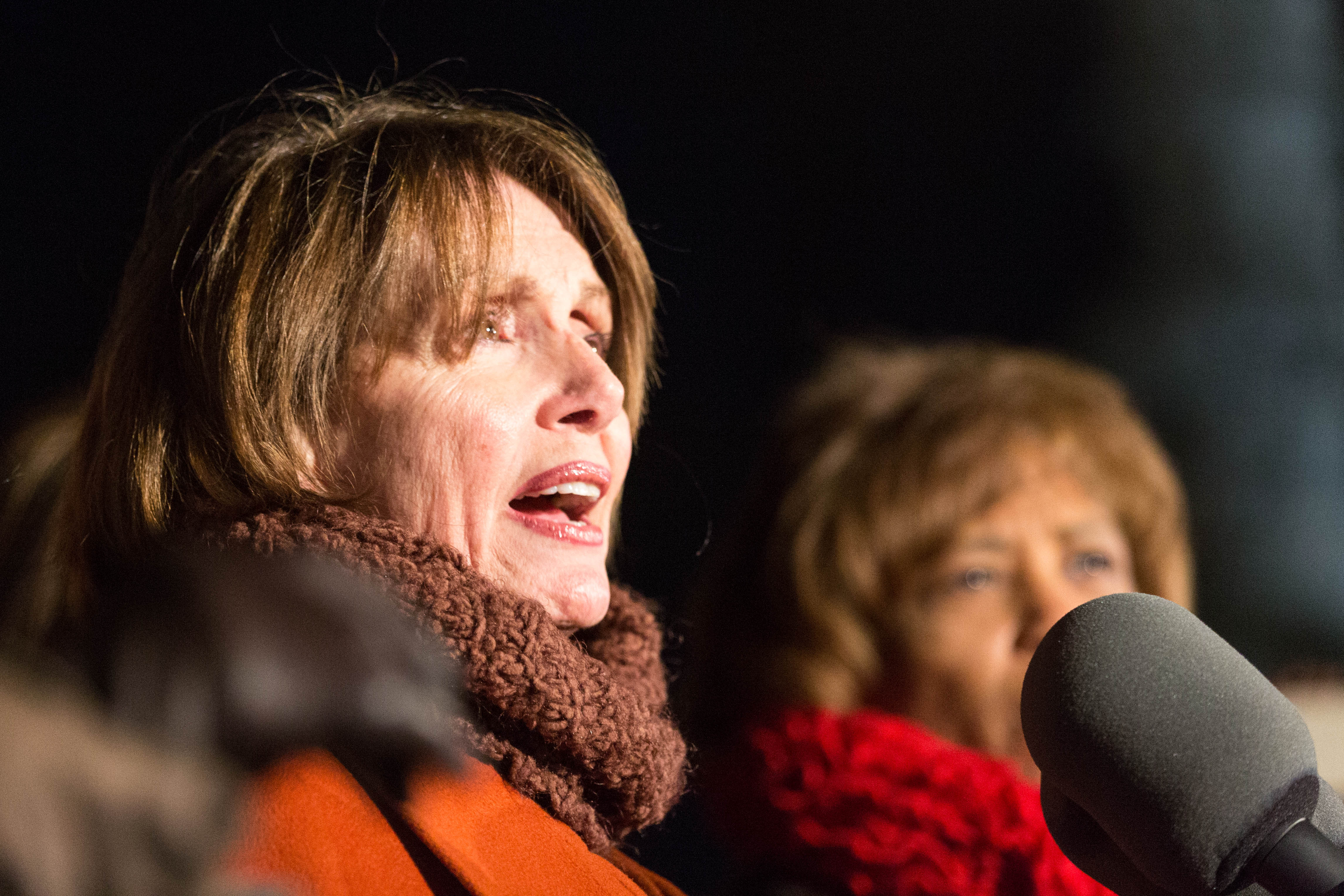
Pelosi speaking against President Trump's immigration ban

Pelosi voted against the Secure Fence Act of 2006.

In June 2018, Pelosi visited a federal facility used to detain migrant children separated from their parents and subsequently called for the resignation of Department of Homeland Security Secretary Kirstjen Nielsen. In July, Pelosi characterized the compromise immigration bill by the Republicans as a "deal with the devil" and said she had not had conversations with House Speaker Ryan about a legislative solution to the separation of families at the southern border.

In April 2021, after southern border crossings peaked, House Republicans criticized Pelosi for saying that immigration under the Biden administration was "on a good path". U.S. Customs and Border Protection reported that nearly 19,000 unaccompanied minors arrived in March.

=== LGBT rights ===
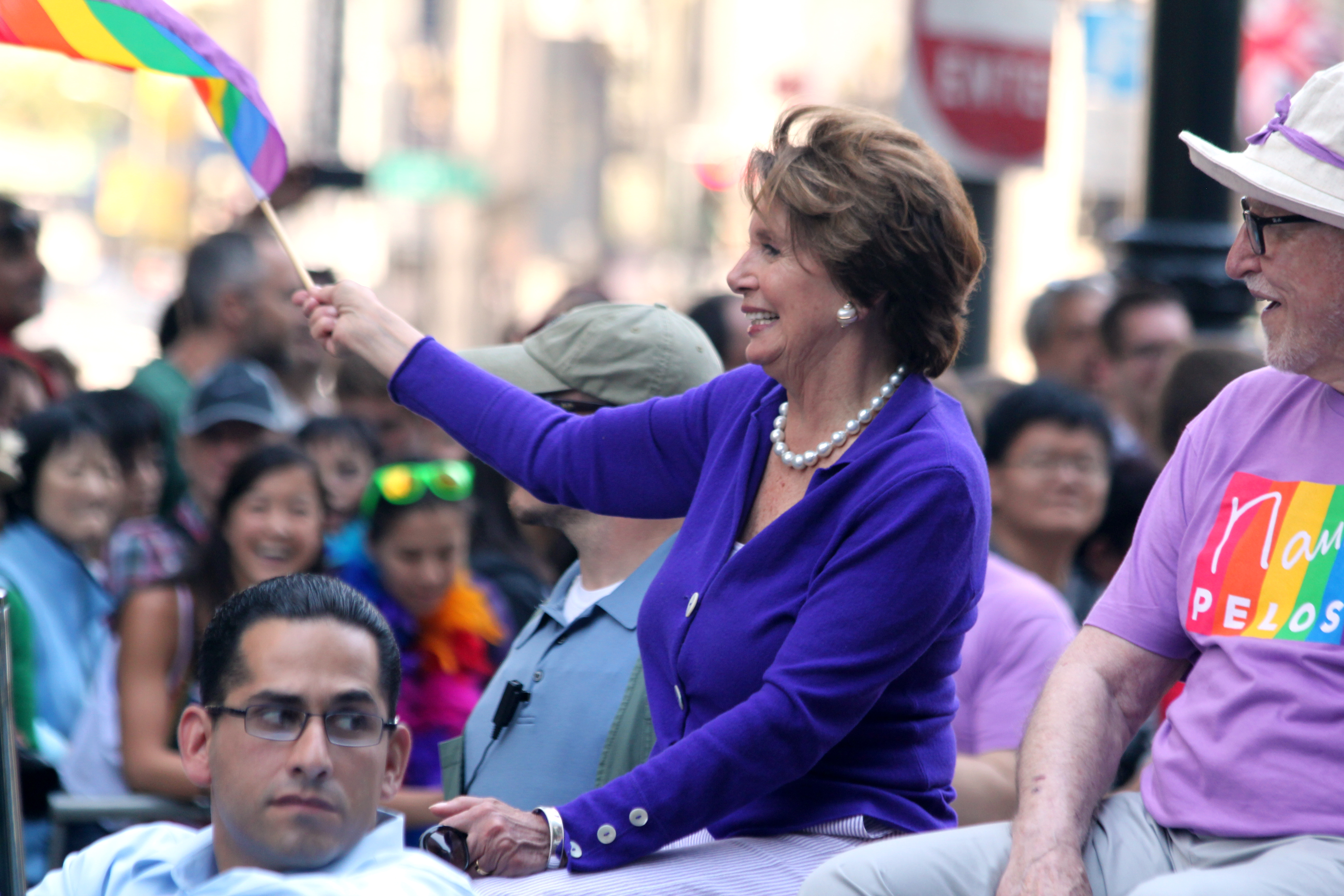
Pelosi at the 2013 San Francisco Pride Festival

Pelosi has long supported LGBT rights. In 1996, she voted against the Defense of Marriage Act, and in 2004 and 2006, she voted against the proposed Federal Marriage Amendment, which would amend the United States Constitution to define marriage federally as being between one man and one woman, thereby overriding states' individual rights to legalize same-sex marriage. When the Supreme Court of California overturned the state's ban on marriage between same-sex couples in 2008, Pelosi released a statement welcoming the "historic decision". She also indirectly voiced her opposition to California Proposition 8, a successful 2008 state ballot initiative which defined marriage in California as a union between one man and one woman.

In 2012, Pelosi said her position on LGBT rights such as same-sex marriage grows from and reflects her Catholic faith; it also places her at odds with Catholic doctrine, which defines marriage as a union between one man and one woman. She said: "My religion compels me—and I love it for it—to be against discrimination of any kind in our country, and I consider [the ban on gay marriage] a form of discrimination. I think it's unconstitutional on top of that."

Pelosi supports the Equality Act, a bill that would expand the federal Civil Rights Act of 1964 to ban discrimination based on sexual orientation and gender identity. In 2019, she spoke in Congress in favor of the bill and called for ending discrimination against LGBT people. Pelosi also opposed Trump's transgender military ban.

=== Marijuana ===
Pelosi supports reform in marijuana laws, although NORML's deputy director Paul Armentano said she and other members of Congress had not done anything to change the laws. She also supports use of medical marijuana.

=== PRISM ===
As of 2014, Pelosi supported the Bush/Obama NSA surveillance program PRISM.

=== Removal from the Capitol of art depicting Confederates ===
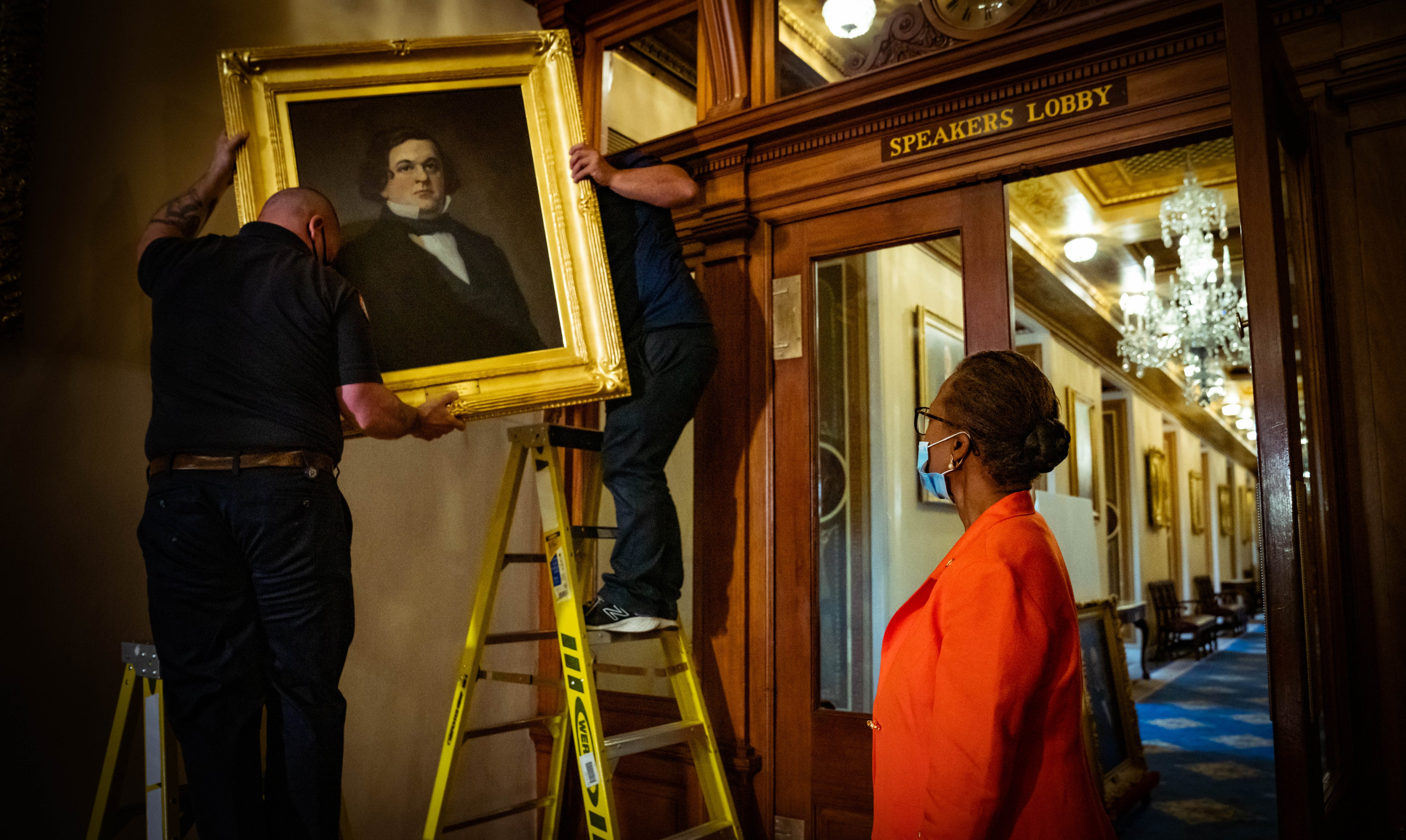
Capitol workers remove the portrait of former House Speaker Howell Cobb of Georgia from a wall in the Speakers Lobby of the U.S. Capitol.

Pelosi repeatedly criticized the fact that the United States Capitol exhibited artworks depicting people who in various capacities supported the Confederacy in the American Civil War. In 2017, this included at least 10 statues in the National Statuary Hall Collection, either in the National Statuary Hall itself or some less prominent Capitol rooms. Almost all the statues in that collection were selected and donated by the states (two from each state) and could only be exchanged for others by an ordered process involving the consent of the states' legislatures and governors, but the speaker of the House directly could influence their precise placement.

During her first tenure as speaker, Pelosi moved the statue of Robert E. Lee from the National Statuary Hall of the U.S. Capitol to the Capitol crypt. In August 2017, she supported an initiative by Senator Cory Booker to have Confederate monuments and memorials removed from the Capitol Building by means of legislation.

In June 2020, following the nationwide protests over the murder of George Floyd, Pelosi pushed for the removal of all statues of Confederates from the Capitol. On June 18, Pelosi also ordered that four paintings of former Confederates in the Capitol Speaker's Gallery be taken down. "We didn't know about this until we were taking inventory of the statues and the curator told us that there were four paintings of Speakers in the Capitol of the United States, four Speakers who had served in the Confederacy", Pelosi told reporters.

=== Waterboarding ===
In 2002, while Pelosi was the ranking member of the House Intelligence Committee, she was briefed on the ongoing use of "enhanced interrogation techniques", including waterboarding, authorized for a captured terrorist, Abu Zubaydah. After the briefing, Pelosi said she "was assured by lawyers with the CIA and the Department of Justice that the methods were legal". Two unnamed former Bush administration officials say the briefing was detailed and graphic, and at the time she did not raise substantial objections. One unnamed U.S. official present during the early briefings said, "In fairness, the environment was different then because we were closer to September 11 and people were still in a panic. But there was no objecting, no hand-wringing. The attitude was, 'We don't care what you do to those guys as long as you get the information you need to protect the American people.'"

These techniques later became controversial, and in 2007 Pelosi's office said she had protested their use at the time, and she concurred with objections raised by Democratic colleague Jane Harman in a letter to the CIA in early 2003. Subsequently, several leading Democratic lawmakers in the House signed a letter on June 26, 2009, alleging CIA Director Leon Panetta had asserted that the CIA misled Congress for a "number of years" spanning back to 2001, casting clouds on the controversy. The letter, lawmakers and the CIA all providing no details, and the circumstances surrounding the allegations, make it hard to assess the claims and counterclaims of both sides.

Officials in Congress say her ability to challenge the practices may have been hampered by strict rules of secrecy that prohibited her from taking notes or consulting legal experts or members of her own staffs. In an April 2009 press conference, Pelosi said: "In that or any other briefing ... we were not, and I repeat, were not told that waterboarding or any of these other enhanced interrogation techniques were used. What they did tell us is that they had some legislative counsel—the Office of Legislative Counsel opinions that they could be used, but not that they would. And they further [...] the point was that if and when they would be used, they would brief Congress at that time."

== Economy ==
=== Fiscal policy ===
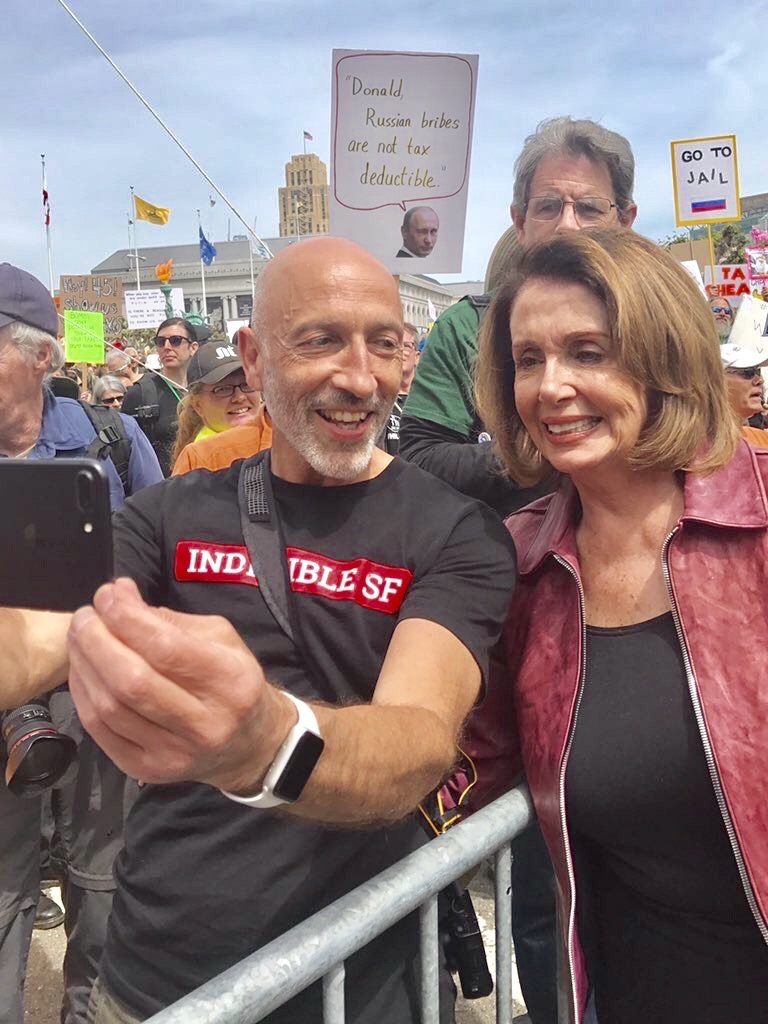
Pelosi at the Tax March in San Francisco, April 2017

Pelosi voted against the 1995 Balanced Budget Proposed Constitutional Amendment, which passed the House by a 300–132 vote, but fell two votes short of the 2/3 supermajority required in the Senate (with 65 senators voting in favor).

As Speaker of the House, she spearheaded the Fair Minimum Wage Act of 2007 as part of the 100-Hour Plan. The act raises the minimum wage in the United States and the territories of the Northern Marianas Islands and American Samoa. American Samoa was initially absent from the act, but it was included as part of HR 2206. One Republican congressman who voted against the initial bill accused Pelosi of unethically benefiting Del Monte Foods (headquartered in her district) by excluding the territory, where Del Monte's StarKist Tuna brand is a major employer. Pelosi co-sponsored legislation that omitted American Samoa from a raise in the minimum wage as early as 1999, before Del Monte's acquisition of StarKist Tuna in 2002.

Pelosi opposed the welfare reform President Bush proposed as well as reforms proposed and passed under President Clinton. She also opposed the tax reform signed by Trump in December 2017, calling it "probably one of the worst bills in the history of the United States of America ... It robs from the future [and] it rewards the rich ... and corporations at the expense of tens of millions of working middle-class families in our country." She said "this is Armageddon" and argued that the tax bill increased the debt in a way that would adversely impact social insurance spending. In January 2018, shortly after the tax bill passed, a reporter asked Pelosi to respond to statements by companies crediting the tax cuts with allowing them to raise wages and give bonuses. She said that, given the benefits corporations received from the tax bill, the benefits workers got were "crumbs". Most companies that awarded bonuses gave out payments of hundreds of dollars, while some gave bonuses significantly over $1,000.

=== Infrastructure ===
In November 2018, Pelosi said she had spoken with Trump about infrastructure development. Though he "really didn't come through with it in his first two years in office" while it was a topic during his campaign, the subject had not been a partisan matter in Congress. She mentioned potential bipartisan legislative initiatives that would "create good paying jobs and will also generate other economic growth in their regions". On May 1, 2019, Pelosi and Schumer met with Trump about infrastructure funding. In late May, a meeting to discuss an impending $2 trillion infrastructure plan was cut short when Trump abruptly left after only a few minutes.

=== Disaster relief ===
In August 2018, after Trump signed an emergency declaration for federal aid in combating the Carr Fire in Northern California, Pelosi called the move "an important first step" but requested that Trump accede to California Governor Jerry Brown's request for further aid to other hard-hit areas in California. She called on the Trump administration to take "real, urgent action to combat the threat of the climate crisis, which is making the wildfire season longer, more expensive and more destructive".

== Education ==
In 1999, Pelosi voted against displaying the Ten Commandments in public buildings, including schools. She voted for the No Child Left Behind Act, which instituted testing to track students' progress and authorized an increase in overall education spending.

== Environment ==
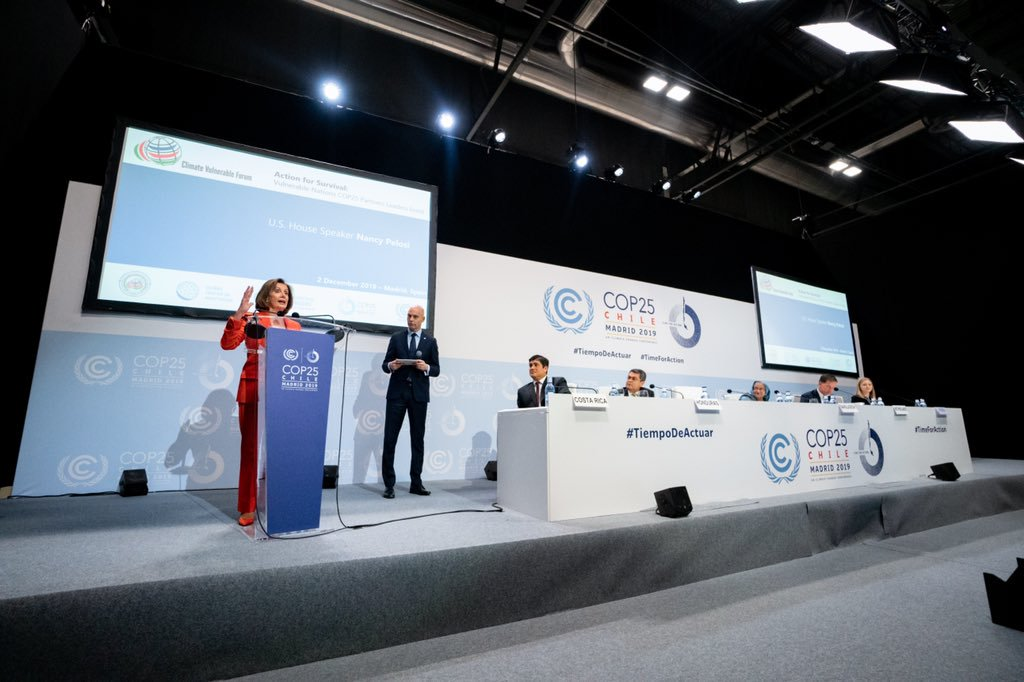
Nancy Pelosi at 2019 United Nations Climate Change Conference (COP25)

In 2019, Pelosi said climate change was "the existential threat of our time" and called for action to curb it. She has supported the development of new technologies to reduce U.S. dependence on foreign oil and remediate the adverse environmental effects of burning fossil fuels. Pelosi has widely supported conservation programs and energy research appropriations. She has also voted to remove an amendment that would allow for oil and gas exploration in the Arctic National Wildlife Refuge.

Pelosi has blocked efforts to revive offshore oil drilling in protected areas, reasoning that offshore drilling could lead to an increase in dependence on fossil fuels.

== Health care ==
=== Affordable Care Act ===
Pelosi was instrumental in passing the Affordable Care Act of 2010. She was a key figure in convincing Obama to continue pushing for health-care reform after the election of Massachusetts Senator Scott Brown in a January special election—a defeat seen as potentially fatal to Democratic reform efforts. After delivering 219 votes in the House for Obama's health-care package, Pelosi was both praised and heckled as she made her way to Capitol Hill.

Pelosi has voted to increase Medicare and Medicaid benefits. She does not endorse Senator Bernie Sanders's bill for single-payer healthcare.

On March 10, 2017, Pelosi said Democrats would continue battling Republican efforts to repeal the Affordable Care Act, but would also be willing to form a compromise measure if Republicans reached out for support. She indicated her support for the Republican plan to expand Health Savings Accounts and said the question of Republicans' accepting an expansion of Medicaid was important. In September, Pelosi sent a letter to Democrats praising Senator John McCain for announcing his opposition to the latest Republican effort to repeal and replace the Affordable Care Act and called on lawmakers and advocacy groups alike to pressure Republicans in the health-care discussion. She said Democrats would be unified in putting "a stake in the heart of this monstrous bill".

In July 2018, during a speech at Independence First, Pelosi said Democrats' goal "has always been to expand coverage and to do so in a way that improves benefits ... and we have to address the affordability issue that is so undermined by the Republicans." In November 2018, after Democrats gained a majority in the House in the midterm elections, she said, "I'm staying as Speaker to protect the Affordable Care Act. That's my main issue, because I think that's, again, about the health and financial health of the America's families, and if Hillary had won, I could go home." She added that Republicans had misrepresented their earlier position of opposition to covering people with preexisting conditions during the election cycle and called on them to join Democrats in "removing all doubt that the preexisting medical condition is the law—the benefit—is the law of the land".

=== Abortion ===
Pelosi voted against the Partial-Birth Abortion Ban Act of 2003 and earlier attempts at similar bans, and voted against the criminalization of certain situations where a minor is transported across state lines for an abortion (HR 748, passed).

She has voted in favor of lifting the ban on privately funded abortions at overseas U.S. military facilities (HA 209, rejected); in favor of an amendment that would repeal a provision forbidding servicewomen and dependents from getting an abortion in overseas military hospitals (HA 722, rejected); and in favor of stripping the prohibition of funding for organizations working overseas that use their own funds to provide abortion services, or engage in advocacy related to abortion services (HA 997, rejected). She also voted in favor of the 1998 Abortion Funding Amendment, which would have allowed the use of district funds to promote abortion-related activities, but would have prohibited the use of federal funds.

In 2008, she was rebuked by Archbishop Donald Wuerl of Washington, D.C., for being "incorrect" in comments she made to Tom Brokaw on Meet the Press concerning Church teaching on the subjects of abortion of when a human life begins. The archbishop's statement quoted Pelosi as saying the church has not been able to define when life begins. During the interview she said, "over the history of the church, this [what constitutes the moment of conception] is an issue of controversy." In February 2009, Pelosi met with her bishop, Archbishop George Hugh Niederauer of San Francisco, and with Pope Benedict XVI regarding the controversy.

Pelosi opposed the 2022 overturning of Roe v. Wade, calling it "cruel", "outrageous" and "heart-wrenching".

=== Contraception ===
In a January 25, 2009, interview with George Stephanopoulos for ABC News, Pelosi said that one of the reasons she supported family planning services was that they would "reduce costs to states and to the federal government."

== Security ==
=== Gun laws ===
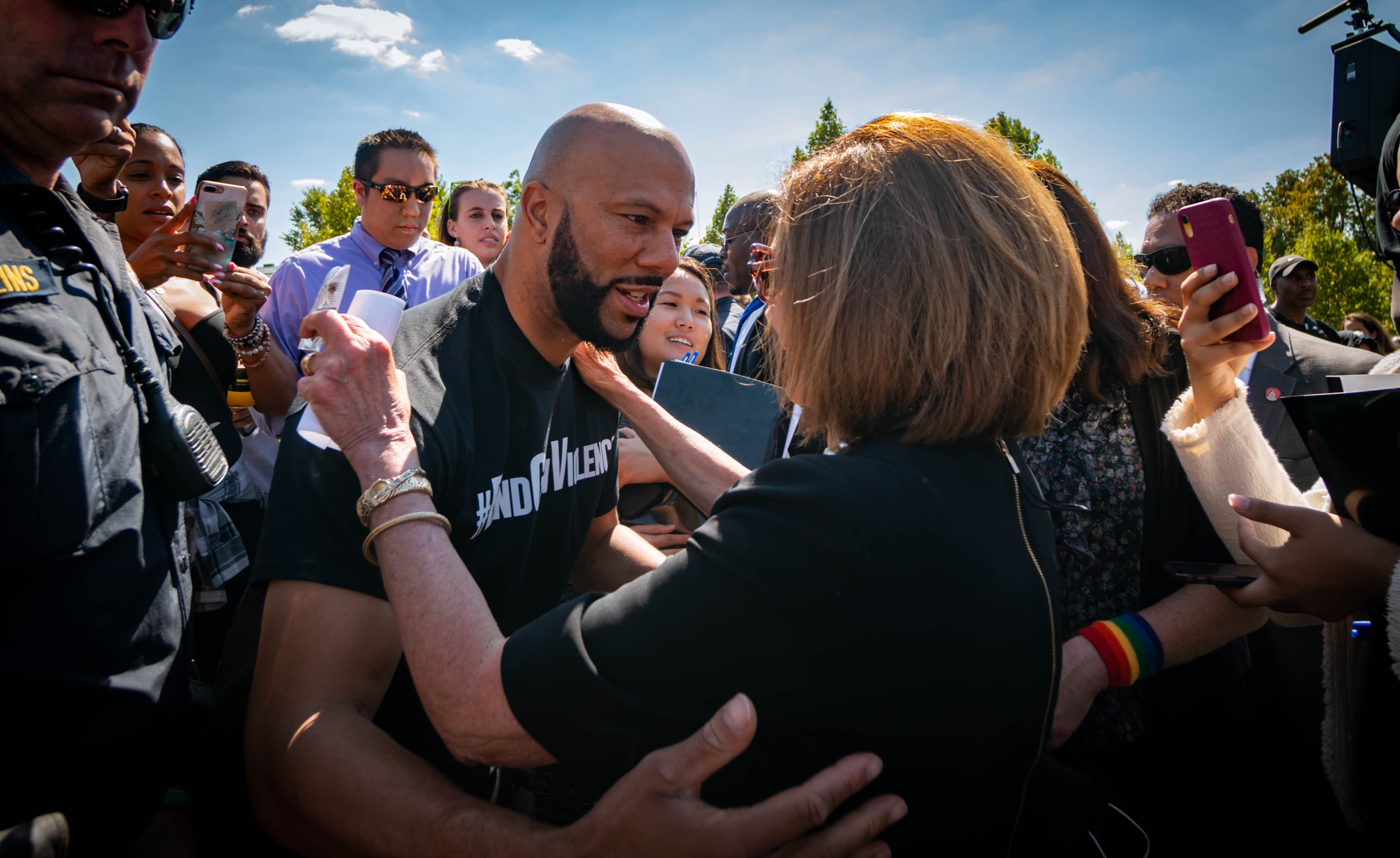
Nancy Pelosi embracing Common at 2019 End Gun Violence, September 27, 2019

Pelosi stands in favor of increased background checks for potential gun owners, as well as the banning of assault weapons. In February 2013, she called for the "Boldest possible move" on gun control, similar to a stance made just weeks earlier by former Representative, mass shooting victim, and fellow gun control advocate Gabby Giffords. In 2012, she was given a 0% rating by Gun Owners of America and a 7% rating from the National Rifle Association of America for her stances on gun control.

In February 2018, following the Stoneman Douglas High School shooting, Pelosi said Republicans' "cowering" to the gun lobby was "an assault on our whole country" and that the victims were "paying the price for our inaction". She requested House Speaker Ryan and Republicans take action via consideration of legislation expanding background checks or authorizing researchers to use federal dollars to examine public health as it relates to gun violence. Pelosi also advocated for the creation of a special committee on gun violence and said Republicans had previously created committees to investigate Planned Parenthood and the 2012 Benghazi attack.

In November 2018, after the Thousand Oaks shooting, Pelosi released a statement saying Americans "deserve real action to end the daily epidemic of gun violence that is stealing the lives of our children on campuses, in places of worship and on our streets" and pledged that gun control would be a priority for House Democrats in the 116th United States Congress.

=== Military draft ===
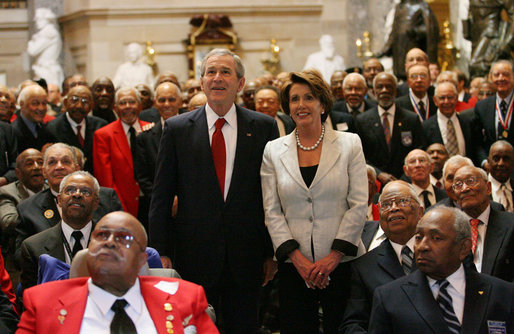
President George W. Bush and Pelosi honoring 300 Tuskegee Airmen at the Capitol, March 2007

With regard to Representative Charles Rangel's (D-NY) plan to introduce legislation that would reinstate the draft, Pelosi said she did not support it.

=== Use of government aircraft ===
In March 2009, conservative watchdog group Judicial Watch had obtained emails sent by Pelosi's staff requesting the United States Air Force (USAF) to provide specific aircraft—a Boeing 757—for Pelosi to use for taxpayer-funded travel. Pelosi responded that the policy was initiated by President Bush due to post-9/11 security concerns (Pelosi was third in line for presidential succession), and was initially provided for the previous Speaker Dennis Hastert. The Sergeant at Arms requested—for security reasons—that the plane provided be capable of non-stop flight, requiring a larger aircraft. The Pentagon said "no one has rendered judgment" that Pelosi's use of aircraft "is excessive".

== Foreign affairs ==
=== China, Hong Kong and Taiwan ===
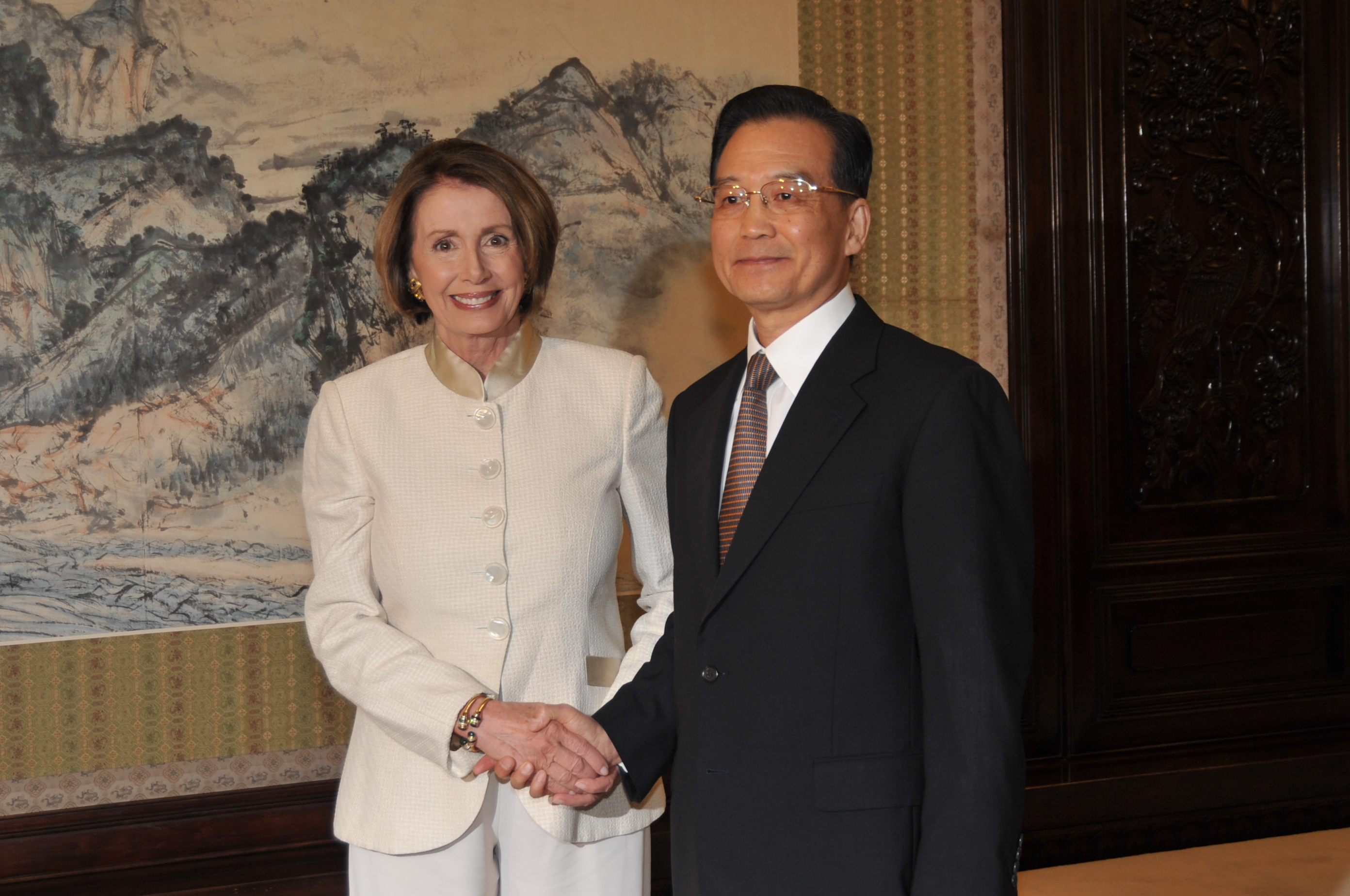
Pelosi with Chinese premier Wen Jiabao during a trip to China in 2009

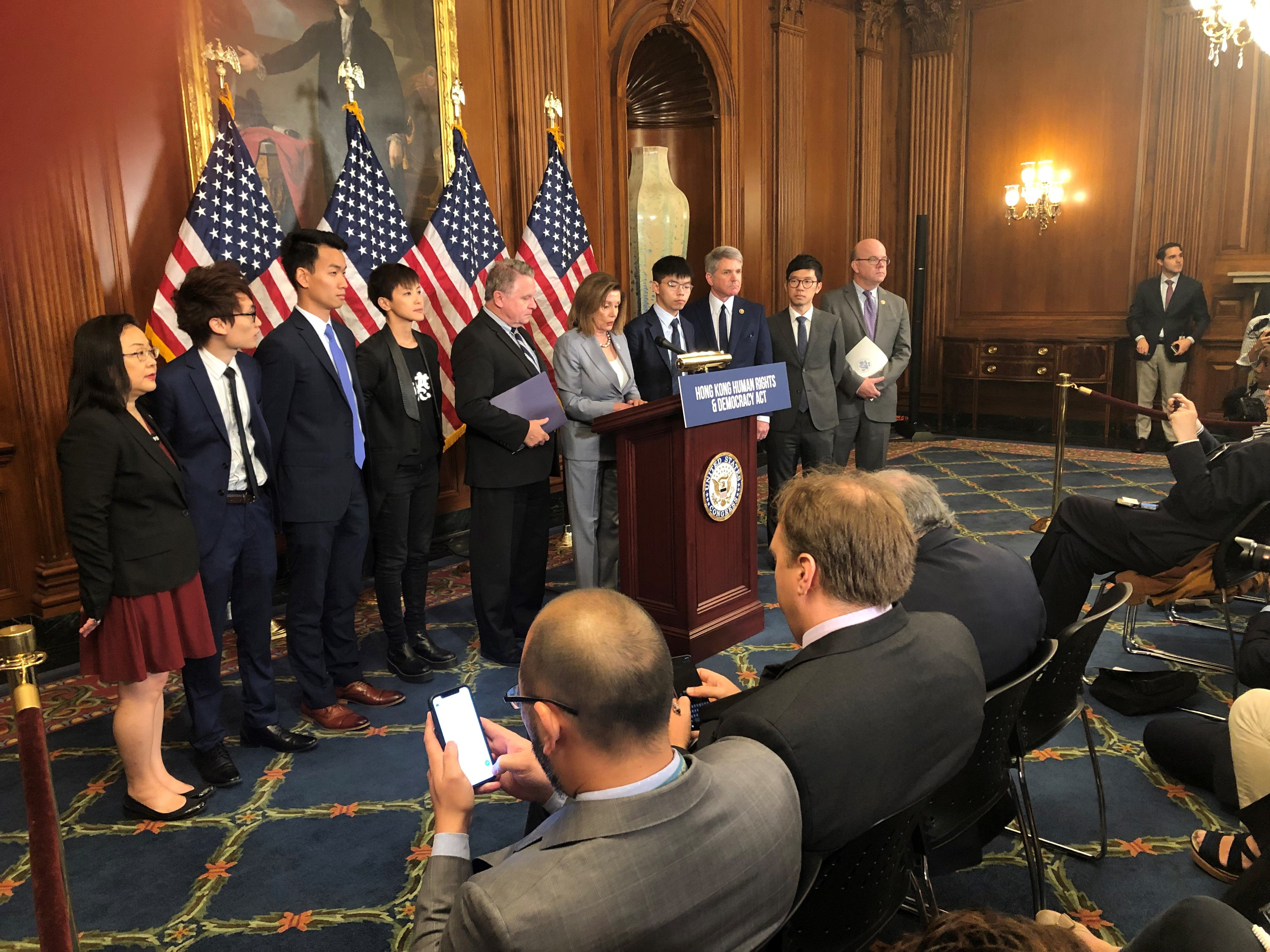
Pelosi with Hong Kong activists who have become prominent figures in the 2019–2020 Hong Kong protests

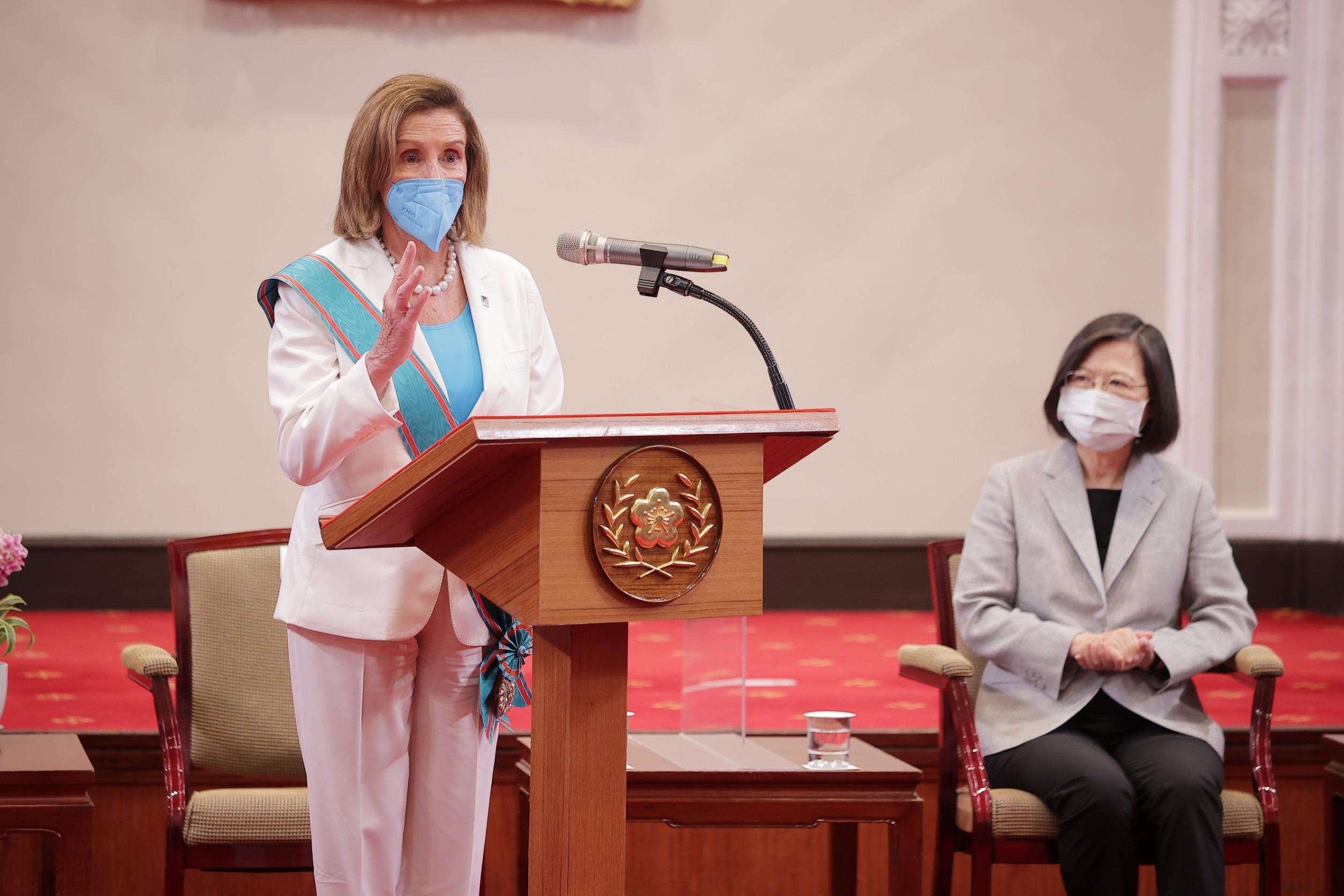
Pelosi with Taiwanese president Tsai Ing-wen during her trip to Taiwan in 2022

After the 1989 Tiananmen Square protests, Pelosi sought to take a harsher position toward China than President George H.W. Bush. With the support of Senate Majority Leader George Mitchell, she took a lead role for the Democrats in criticizing Bush's China policy. Pelosi's view was that Congress should oppose the annual presidential waiver for China under the Jackson-Vanik Amendment, an amendment to the Trade Act of 1974 that required the president to inform Congress if he intended to waive the Act to have a most favored nation trading relationship with a non-market economy. Pelosi said that if China's economy suffered, Chinese people would be unhappy with their government and this would serve to advance democracy in China.

As part of a Congressional delegation, Pelosi unfurled a banner in the square in 1991, provoking a confrontation with Chinese police. She advocated for Chinese political prisoners and dissidents to be able to come to the U.S. In 1999, ahead of Chinese Premier Zhu Rongji's visit to the U.S. for talks over World Trade Organization admission for China, Pelosi called on President Clinton and Vice President Gore to ask Zhu to recognize the 1989 protests as a pro-democracy effort.

In 2008, after a meeting with the Dalai Lama and officials in the Tibetan government-in-exile, Pelosi criticized the People's Republic of China for its handling of the unrest in Tibet; addressing a crowd of thousands of Tibetans in Dharamsala, India, Pelosi called on "freedom-loving people" worldwide to denounce China for its human rights abuses in Tibet. The same year, Pelosi commended the European Parliament for its "bold decision" to award the Sakharov Prize for Freedom of Thought to Chinese dissident and human rights activist Hu Jia, and called upon the Chinese government "to immediately and unconditionally release Hu Jia from prison and to respect the fundamental freedoms of all the people in China."

In 2010, Pelosi backed a bill naming China a currency manipulator, which would appease exporters.

Pelosi criticized the imprisonment of Hong Kong democracy activists in August 2017 for their roles in a protest at the Civic Square in front of the Central Government Complex in Hong Kong. She called the ruling an injustice that should "shock the conscience of the world".

Before the Trump administration took concrete measures against China in late March 2018, Pelosi and other Democratic leaders pressed Trump to focus more on China and impose real punishments, such as fulfilling his own campaign commitments to name China a currency manipulator and stop China from pressuring U.S. tech companies into giving up intellectual property rights. Pelosi urged Trump to take a strong stand against unfair market barriers in China.

In September 2019, Pelosi met with Hong Kong pro-democracy activist Joshua Wong on Capitol Hill; Chinese media responded by accusing Pelosi of "backing and encouraging radical activists".

On the eve of the 2022 Winter Olympics in Beijing, Pelosi advised American athletes competing: "I would say to our athletes, 'You're there to compete. Do not risk incurring the anger of the Chinese government, because they are ruthless'".

On August 2, 2022, Pelosi became the highest-ranking U.S. government official to visit Taiwan in 25 years. President Joe Biden discouraged but did not prevent Pelosi from traveling to Taiwan, and the White House later affirmed her right to visit. Senate Minority Leader Mitch McConnell and 25 Senate Republicans backed Pelosi's decision to visit, issuing a joint statement that also supported the trip. Her trip triggered a new round of hostilities in the already tense relationship between the U.S. and China. During and after her visit, China undertook a series of retaliatory measures against Taiwan and the United States. Pelosi said her visit was a sign of the U.S. Congress's commitment to Taiwan. During her visit, she met with Taiwanese President Tsai Ing-Wen and called Taiwan one of the "freest societies in the world". On August 5, 2022, the Chinese government sanctioned Pelosi for "seriously interfering in China's internal affairs, undermining China's sovereignty and territorial integrity, trampling on the one-China policy, and threatening the peace and stability of the Taiwan Strait".

=== Colombia ===
Pelosi publicly scolded Colombian president Álvaro Uribe during Uribe's May 2007 state visit to America. Pelosi met with Uribe and later released a statement that she and other members of Congress had "expressed growing concerns about the serious allegations" of links between paramilitary groups and Colombian government officials. Pelosi also came out against the Colombian free-trade agreement.

=== Cuba ===
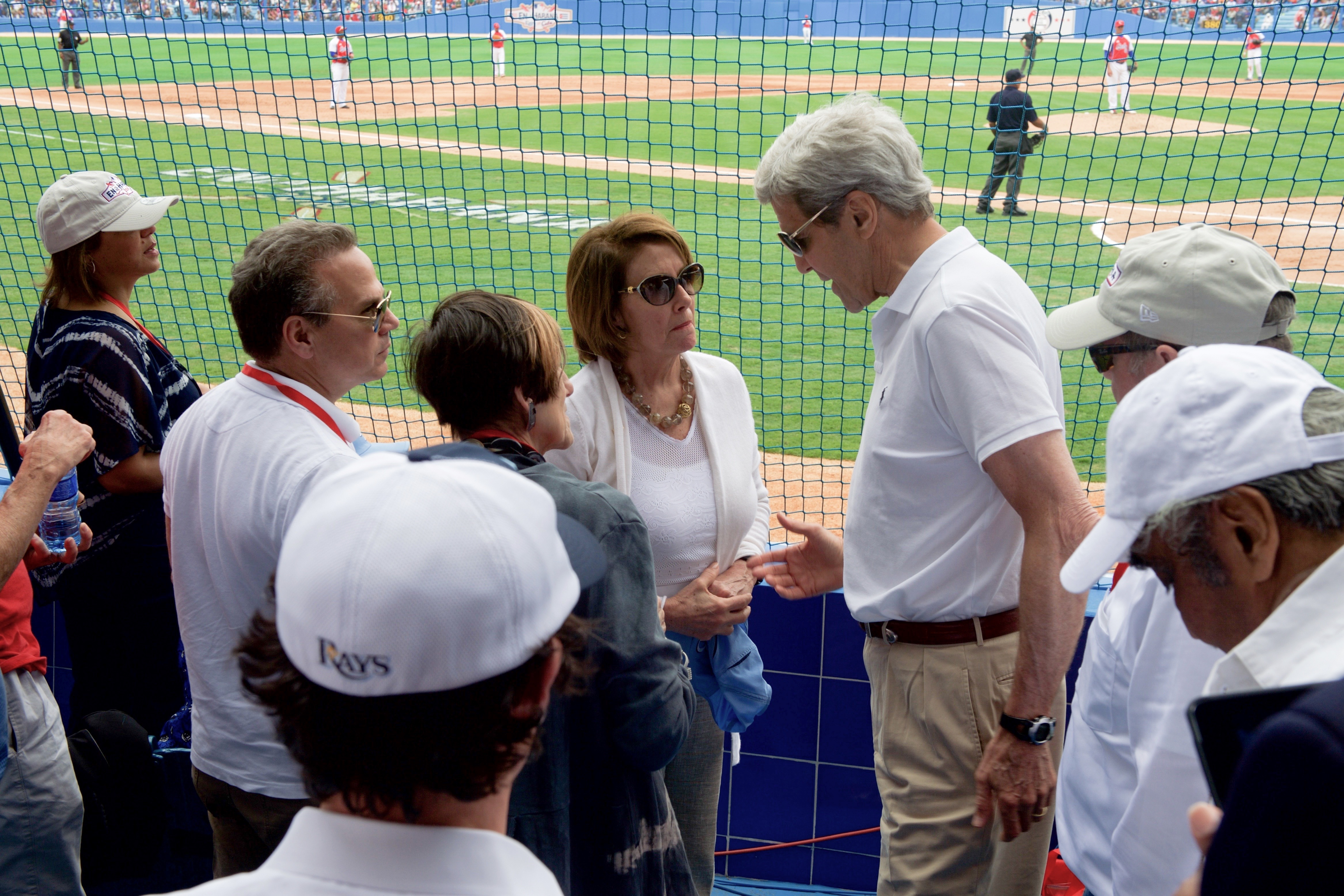
Pelosi and Secretary of State John Kerry at Estadio Latinoamericano in Havana, Cuba, March 2016

In 2008, Pelosi said: "For years, I have opposed the embargo on Cuba. I don't think it's been successful, and I think we have to remove the travel bans and have more exchanges—people to people exchanges with Cuba." In 2015, Pelosi supported President Obama's Cuban Thaw, a rapprochement between the U.S. and Castro's regime in Cuba, and visited Havana for meetings with high-level officials.

=== First Gulf War ===
Pelosi opposed U.S. intervention in the 1991 Gulf War.

=== Iran ===
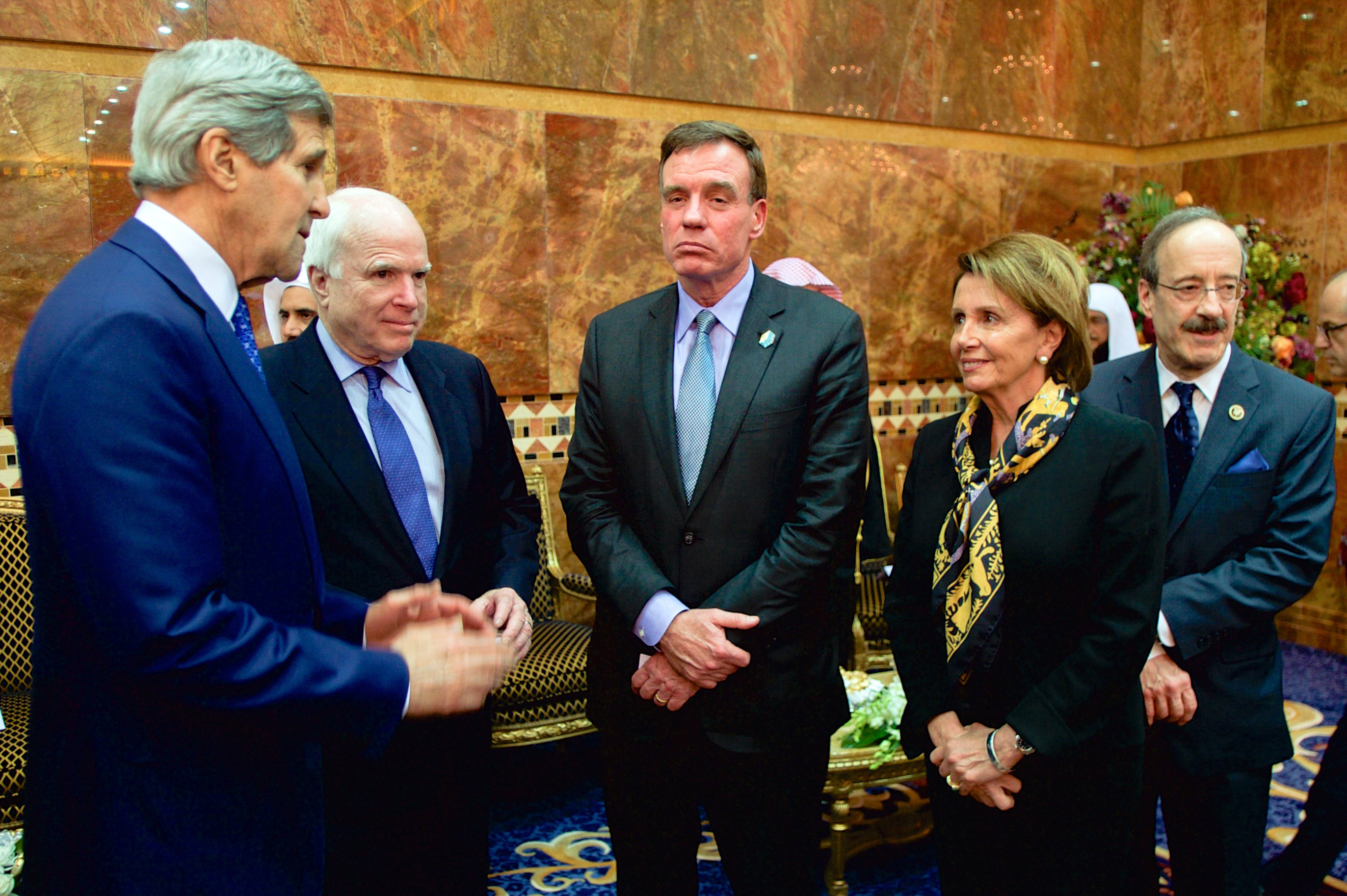
Pelosi with Secretary of State John Kerry and Senators John McCain and Mark Warner before greeting the new King Salman of Saudi Arabia in Riyadh, January 2015

In an interview on February 15, 2007, Pelosi said that Bush consistently said he supports a diplomatic resolution to differences with Iran "and I take him at his word". At the same time, she said, "I do believe that Congress should assert itself, though, and make it very clear that there is no previous authority for the president, any president, to go into Iran". On January 12, 2007, Congressman Walter B. Jones of North Carolina introduced a resolution requiring that—absent a national emergency created by an attack, or a demonstrably imminent attack, by Iran upon the United States or its armed forces—the president must consult with Congress and receive specific authorization prior to initiating any use of military force against Iran. This resolution was removed from a military spending bill for the war in Iraq by Pelosi on March 13, 2007.

In July 2015, Pelosi said she was convinced Obama would have enough votes to secure the Iran nuclear deal, crediting the president with having made a "very strong and forceful presentation of his case supporting the nuclear agreement with Iran" and called the deal "a diplomatic masterpiece".

In 2016, Pelosi argued against two bills that if enacted would block Iran's access to the dollar and impose sanctions for its ballistic missile program: "Regardless of whether you supported the Joint Comprehensive Plan of Action (JCPOA), we all agree that Iran must not possess a nuclear weapon. At this time, the JCPOA is the best way to achieve this critical goal."

In May 2018, after Trump announced his intention to withdraw from the Iran nuclear deal, Pelosi said the decision was an abdication of American leadership and "particularly senseless, disturbing & dangerous".

=== Iraq War ===
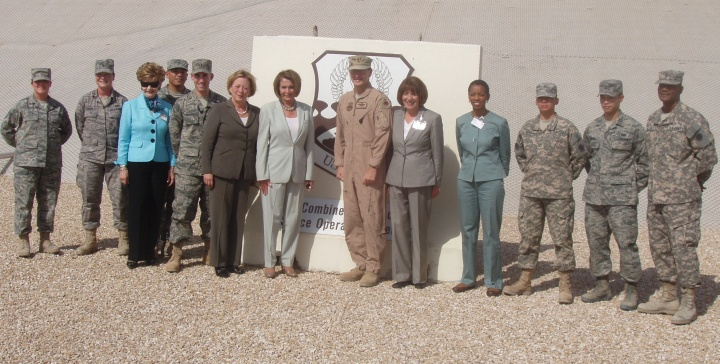
Pelosi with service members stationed at the Al Udeid Air Base in Qatar, 2010

In 2002, Pelosi opposed the Iraq Resolution authorizing President George W. Bush to use military force against Iraq, which passed the House on a 296–133 vote. Pelosi said that "unilateral use of force without first exhausting every diplomatic remedy and other remedies and making a case to the American people will be harmful to our war on terrorism." In explaining her opposition to the resolution, Pelosi said CIA Director George Tenet had told Congress the likelihood of Saddam Hussein's launching an attack on the U.S. using weapons of mass destruction was low, saying: "This is about the Constitution It is about this Congress asserting its right to declare war when we are fully aware what the challenges are to us. It is about respecting the United Nations and a multilateral approach, which is safer for our troops."

Although Pelosi voted against the Iraq War, anti-war activists in San Francisco protested against her voting to continue funding the war. UC Berkeley political scientist Bruce Cain said Pelosi had to balance the demands of her anti-war constituency against the moderate views of Democrats in tight races around the country in her role as minority leader. Pelosi has never faced a serious challenger to her left in her district.

=== Israel ===
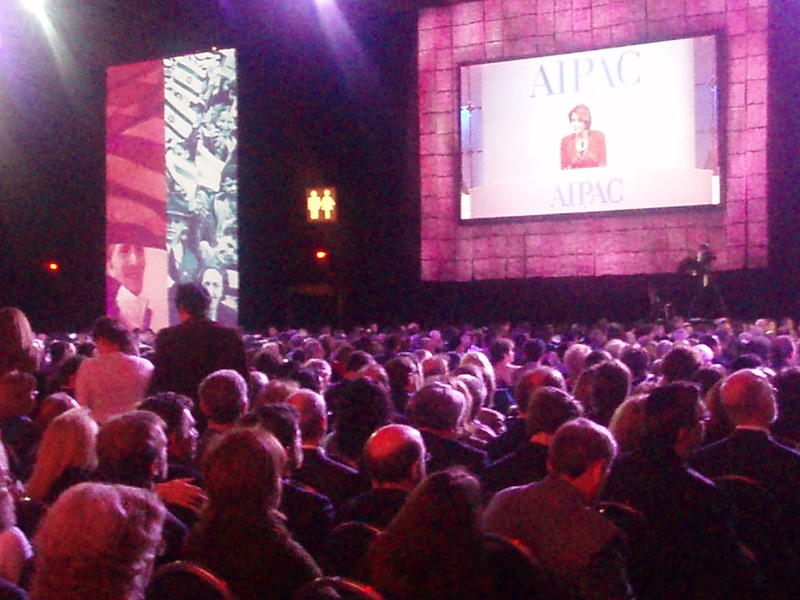
Pelosi at AIPAC's annual Policy Conference in Washington, D.C.

Pelosi has reaffirmed that "America and Israel share an unbreakable bond: in peace and war; and in prosperity and in hardship". She has emphasized that "a strong relationship between the United States and Israel has long been supported by both Democrats and Republicans. America's commitment to the safety and security of the State of Israel is unwavering ... [h]owever, the war in Iraq has made both America and Israel less safe." Pelosi's voting record shows consistent support for Israel. Pelosi voted in favor of the Jerusalem Embassy Act of 1995, which urged the federal government to relocate the American embassy in Israel to Jerusalem. Before the 2006 elections in the Palestinian Authority, she voted for a Congressional initiative that disapproved of participation in the elections by Hamas and other organizations the legislation defined as terrorist. She agrees with the current U.S. stance in support of land-for-peace. She has applauded Israeli "hopeful signs" of offering land while criticizing Palestinian "threats" of not demonstrating peace in turn. Pelosi has said, "If the Palestinians agree to coordinate with Israel on the evacuation, establish the rule of law, and demonstrate a capacity to govern, the world may be convinced that finally there is a real partner for peace".

During the 2006 Lebanon War, Pelosi voted in favor of Resolution 921: "... seizure of Israeli soldiers by Hezbollah terrorists was an unprovoked attack and Israel has the right, and indeed the obligation, to respond." She argues that organizations and political bodies in the Mideast like Hamas and Hezbollah "have a greater interest in maintaining a state of hostility with Israel than in improving the lives of the people they claim to represent". Pelosi asserts that civilians on both sides of the border "have been put at risk by the aggression of Hamas and Hezbollah" in part for their use of "civilians as shields by concealing weapons in civilian areas".

In September 2008, Pelosi hosted a reception in Washington with Israeli Speaker of the Knesset Dalia Itzik, along with 20 members of Congress, where they toasted the "strong friendship" between Israel and the United States. During the ceremony, Pelosi held up replica dog tags of the three Israeli soldiers captured by Hezbollah and Hamas in 2006 and said she keeps them as a "symbol of the sacrifices made, sacrifices far too great by the people of the state of Israel".

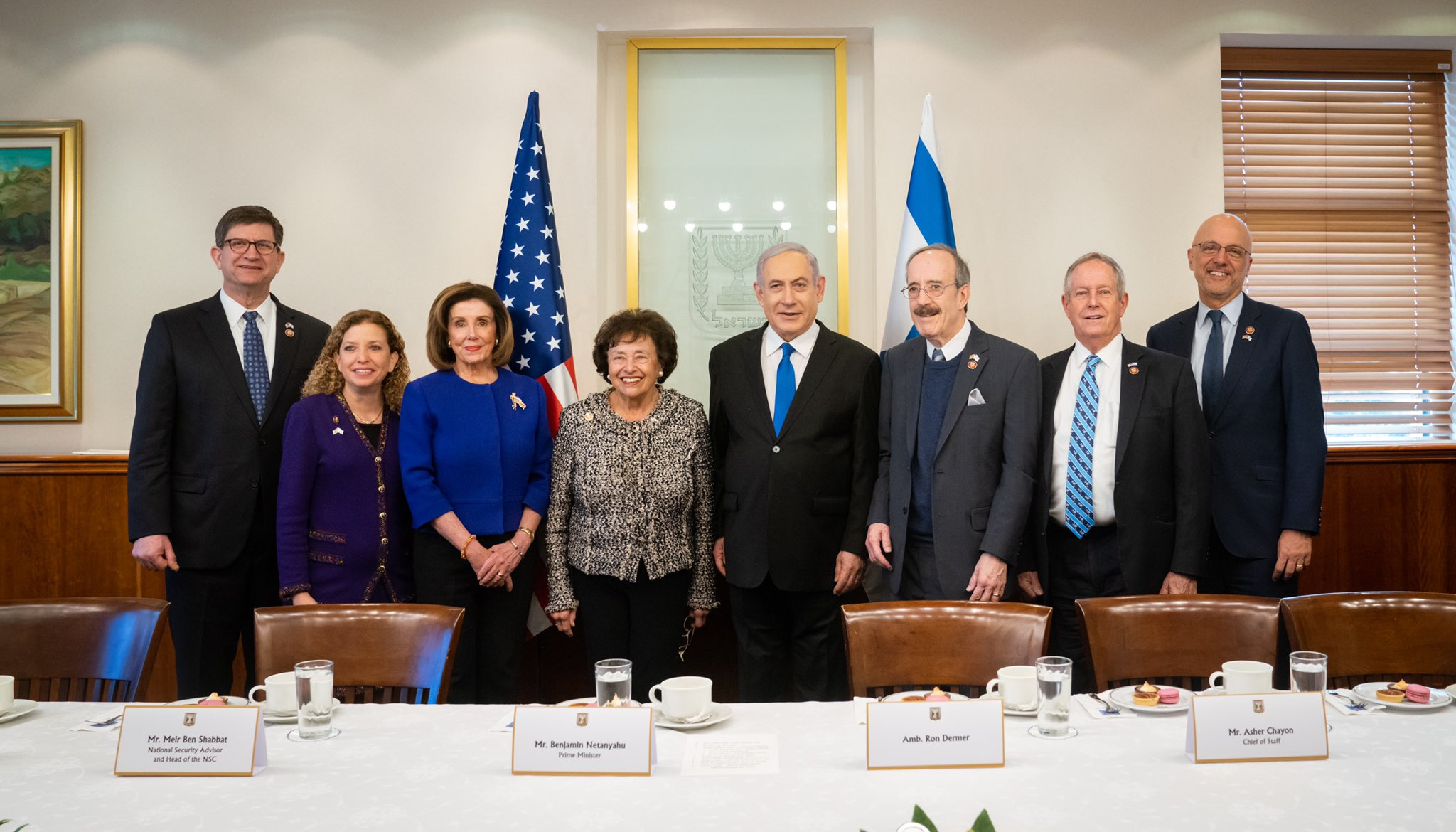
Pelosi and Israeli prime minister Benjamin Netanyahu in Jerusalem, January 2020

Pelosi supported Israel in the 2014 Israel–Gaza conflict. In March 2018 Pelosi said, "There is no greater political accomplishment in the 20th Century than the establishment of the State of Israel." Pelosi condemned Rep. Ilhan Omar of Minnesota for posting controversial tweets related to Jews and Israel. In March 2019, she said, "Israel and America are connected now and forever. We will never allow anyone to make Israel a wedge issue."

In January 2017, Pelosi voted against a House resolution that would condemn the UN Security Council Resolution 2334. This UN Security Council Resolution called Israeli settlement building in the occupied Palestinian territories in the West Bank a "flagrant violation" of international law and a major obstacle to peace. She condemned the Boycott, Divestment, and Sanctions (BDS) movement targeting Israel.

Pelosi has voiced heavy criticism over Israel's plan to annex parts of the West Bank and the Jordan Valley. She said Israeli annexation would undermine U.S. national security interests. Pelosi said that Democrats are taking "a great pride" in Barack Obama's Memorandum of Understanding (MOU) that Israel signed with the Obama administration in 2016, for a guarantee of $38 billion in defense assistance over a decade.

On January 28, 2024, Pelosi suggested that some pro-Palestinian protesters calling for a ceasefire in the Gaza war could be connected to Russia and called on the FBI to investigate the possible connection.

=== North Korea ===
Nancy Pelosi is one of the few members of Congress to have traveled to North Korea. She has expressed concern about the danger of nuclear proliferation from the North Korean regime, and the ongoing problems of hunger and oppression imposed by that country's leadership.

In August 2017, following Trump's warning that North Korea "will be met with fire and fury like the world has never seen" in the event of further threats to the United States, Pelosi said the comments were "recklessly belligerent and demonstrate a grave lack of appreciation for the severity of the North Korean nuclear situation. His saber-rattling and provocative, impulsive rhetoric erode our credibility."

In November 2017, after the Pentagon sent a letter to lawmakers stating a ground invasion was the only way to destroy all North Korea's nuclear weapons without concern for having missed any, Pelosi said she was concerned about Pyongyang's selling nuclear technology to third parties and called for the United States to "exhaust every other remedy".

In June 2018, after Trump praised North Korean leader Kim Jong-un, Pelosi said in a statement, "In his haste to reach an agreement, President Trump elevated North Korea to the level of the United States while preserving the regime's status quo."

=== Russia ===
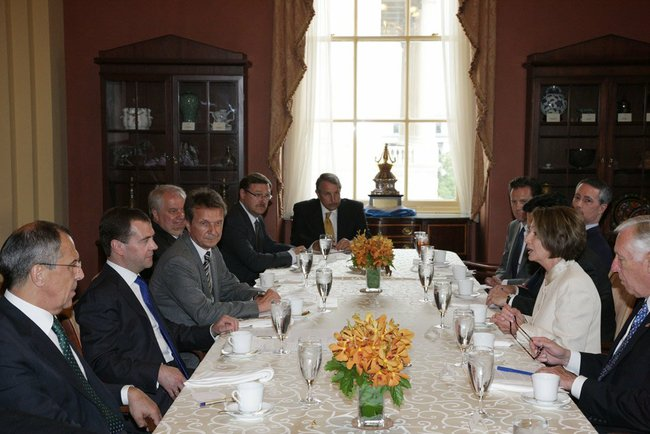
Pelosi meeting with Russian president Dmitry Medvedev, foreign minister Sergey Lavrov, and ambassador Sergey Kislyak, June 2010

In December 2017, Pelosi wrote a letter to Speaker Paul Ryan advocating for the continued House investigation into Russian interference in the 2016 election on the grounds that Americans deserved "a comprehensive and fair investigation into Russia's attack" and "America's democracy and national security" being at stake. Pelosi cited the need for Congress to "fully investigate Russia's assault on our election systems to prevent future foreign attacks".

In February 2018, after the release of a Republican report alleging surveillance abuses by the Justice Department, Pelosi accused Trump of siding with Russian president Vladimir Putin at the expense of preserving intelligence sources and methods. In July, Pelosi asserted that Trump was afraid to mention the 12 indictments against people connected to the intelligence community in Russia during his meeting with Putin and questioned what intelligence the Russians had on Trump to cause his behavior. She said Putin would not be welcomed by Congress even if he visited Washington as a result of his actions: "Putin's ongoing attacks on our elections and on Western democracies and his illegal actions in Crimea and the rest of Ukraine deserve the fierce, unanimous condemnation of the international community, not a VIP ticket to our nation's capital." She called for House Speaker Ryan to "make clear that there is not—and never will be—an invitation for a thug like Putin to address the United States Congress."

On multiple occasions, Pelosi said of Trump, "With him, all roads lead to Putin," including with regard to the Trump-Ukraine scandal, a lack of action against the alleged Russian bounty program, and Trump's incitement of the January 6 United States Capitol attack.

=== Syria, Libya, and Afghanistan ===
Pelosi supports the Syria Accountability Act and Iran Freedom and Support Act. In a speech at the AIPAC 2005 annual conference, Pelosi said that "for too long, leaders from both parties haven't done enough" to put pressure on Russia and China who are providing Iran with technological information on nuclear issues and missiles. "If evidence of participation by other nations in Iran's nuclear program is discovered, I will insist that the Administration use, rather than ignore, the evidence in determining how the U.S. deals with that nation or nations on other issues." In April 2007, Pelosi visited Syria, where she met Foreign Minister Walid Muallem, Vice President Farouk al-Sharaa and President Bashar al-Assad, despite President Bush efforts to isolate Syria, because of militants crossing from Syria into Iraq, and supporting Hezbollah and Hamas. During her visit, she conveyed Israeli Prime Minister Ehud Olmert message for peace, and toured in Al-Hamidiyah Souq, and the Umayyad Mosque.

Pelosi supported the NATO-led military intervention in Libya in 2011. She also favored arming Syria's rebel fighters.

In January 2019, Pelosi criticized President Trump's planned withdrawal of U.S. troops from Syria and Afghanistan. She called Trump's announcement a "Christmas gift to Vladimir Putin". In an October 2019 letter to Democratic caucus members, Pelosi wrote that both parties were condemning President Trump's deserting the US's "Kurdish allies in a foolish attempt to appease an authoritarian strongman" Recep Tayyip Erdoğan of Turkey and opined that the decision "poses a dire threat to regional security and stability, and sends a dangerous message to Iran and Russia, as well as our allies, that the United States is no longer a trusted partner". Later that month, she visited Jordan to discuss the Syrian situation with King Abdullah II. Afterwards, she went to Afghanistan, where she met President Ashraf Ghani and chief executive officer Abdullah Abdullah, and she was also briefed by U.S. diplomats on reconciliation efforts with the Taliban.

=== Turkey and Armenia ===
In mid-October 2007, after the House Foreign Affairs Committee passed a resolution to label the 1915 killing of Armenians by Ottoman Turks as genocide, Pelosi pledged to bring the measure to a vote. The draft resolution prompted warnings from President Bush and fierce criticism from Turkey, with Turkey's Prime Minister saying that approval of the resolution would endanger U.S.–Turkey relations. After House support eroded, the measure's sponsors dropped their call for a vote, and in late October Pelosi agreed to set the matter aside.

The resolution was passed during Pelosi's second term as Speaker. The House voted 405 to 11 in October 2019 to confirm the resolution.

On September 17, 2022, Pelosi visited Armenia during the second Nagorno-Karabakh conflict, becoming the highest-ranking U.S. government official to visit the country (before U.S. Vice President J.D. Vance). Her visit was to convey “the strong and ongoing support of the United States” for Armenia, with the intention to frame her visit in support of human rights. She also paid a visit to the Tsitsernakaberd Armenian genocide memorial in the country's capital, Yerevan.

On February 10, 2026, she reaffirmed her recognition of the Armenian genocide in response to J.D.'s Vance's visit to the Tsitsernakaberd genocide memorial in Yerevan, Armenia.

=== Ukraine ===
On April 30, 2022, Pelosi met with President Volodymyr Zelenskyy in Kyiv, to pledge U.S. support for Ukraine during the Russian invasion.

=== Gaza ===
After the drone strikes on aid workers from World Central Kitchen in April 2024, Pelosi, Mark Pocan, James P. McGovern, Jan Schakowsky, and 36 other Congressional Democrats urged President Biden in an open letter to reconsider planned arms shipments to the Israeli military.

=== Yugoslavia ===
Pelosi supported the NATO bombing of Yugoslavia, saying, "what is happening in Kosovo is a challenge to the conscience of our country, a challenge to the future of NATO.....this is a vital national interest for us, an interest in the fate of NATO."

== First Trump presidency ==
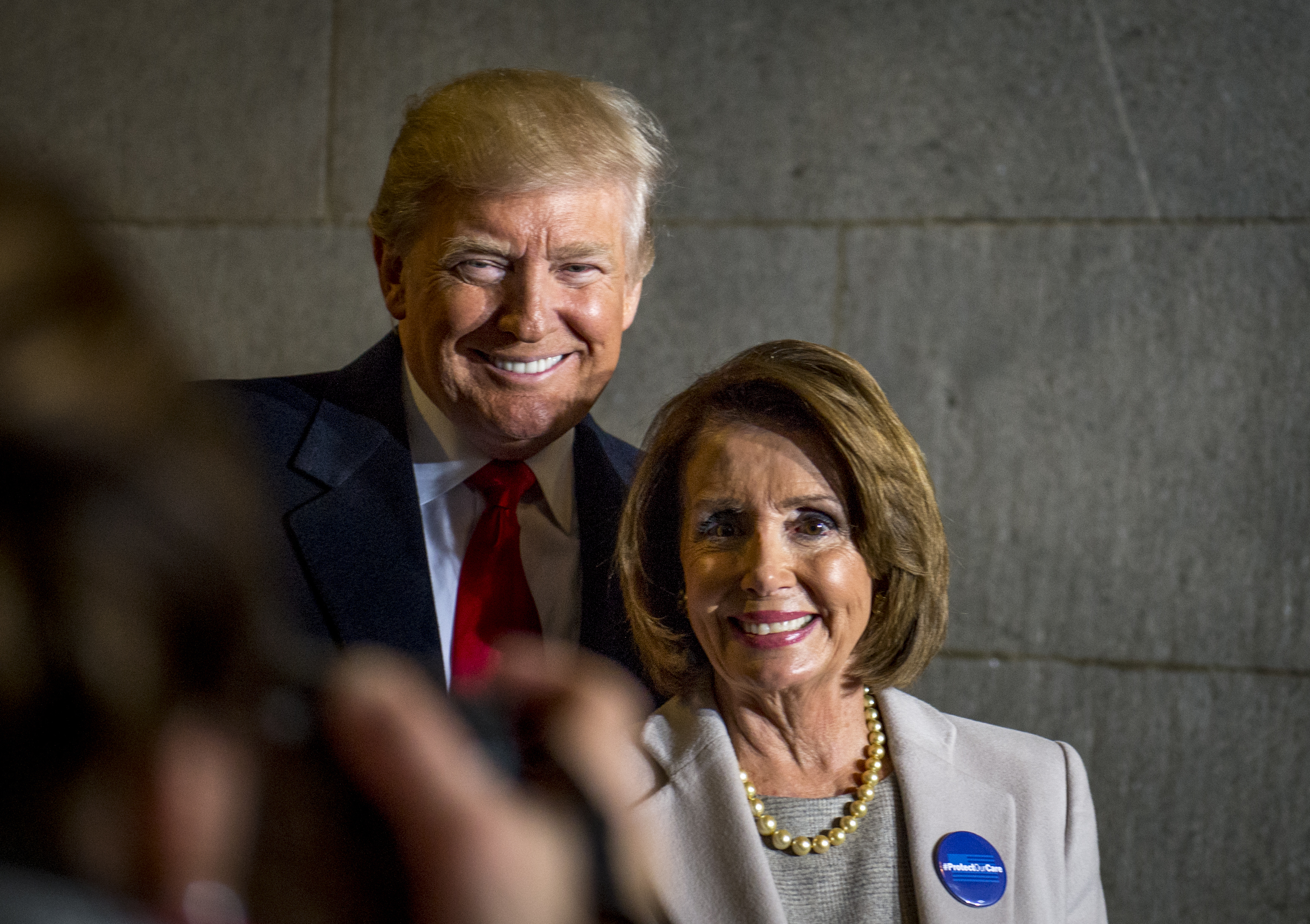
President-elect Donald Trump with Pelosi in January 2017

During the first Trump administration, Pelosi voted in line with the president's stated position 17.6% of the time.

During a news conference on June 9, 2017, after a reporter asked her about tweets by President Donald Trump lambasting former FBI director James Comey following Comey's testimony to the Senate Intelligence Committee, Pelosi said no one at the White House seemed courageous enough to tell Trump his tweets were beneath the dignity of the presidency and that she was worried about his fitness for office. In November, when asked about Democrats beginning the impeachment process against Trump in the event they won a majority of seats in the 2018 elections, Pelosi said it would not be one of their legislative priorities but that the option could be considered if credible evidence appeared during the ongoing investigations into Russian interference in the 2016 election.

In January 2018, Pelosi referred to Trump's 2018 State of the Union Address as a performance without serious policy ideas the parties could collaborate on. She questioned Trump's refusal to implement Russian sanctions after more than 500 members of Congress voted to approve them. In February, after Trump blocked the release of a Democratic memo by the Intelligence Committee, Pelosi said the act was "a stunningly brazen attempt to cover up the truth about the Trump-Russia scandal from the American people" and "part of a dangerous and desperate pattern of cover-up on the part of the president who has shown he had something to hide." In March, Pelosi said she was "more concerned about the president's policies which undermine the financial security of America's working families" than the Stormy Daniels–Donald Trump scandal. Pelosi did note the scandal as having highlighted a double standard of Republicans on issues of family values and expectations of presidential behavior, saying the party would be very involved if the event was happening to a Democrat. In April, following Scooter Libby being pardoned by Trump, Pelosi released a statement saying the pardon "sends a troubling signal to the president's allies that obstructing justice will be rewarded and that the idea of those who lie under oath being granted a pardon "poses a threat to the integrity of the special counsel investigation, and to our democracy". On August 15, after Trump revoked the security clearance of former CIA director John Brennan, Pelosi said the move was "a stunning abuse of power [and] a pathetic attempt to silence critics", and an attempt by Trump to distract attention from other issues of his administration. Pelosi and Charles E. Schumer met with Trump and Pence in December 2018 to discuss changes to be made when the new Democratic representatives takes office in 2019. In January 2019 she supported President Trump in his decision to back the leader of the opposition Juan Guaidó during Venezuelan protests and constitutional crisis.

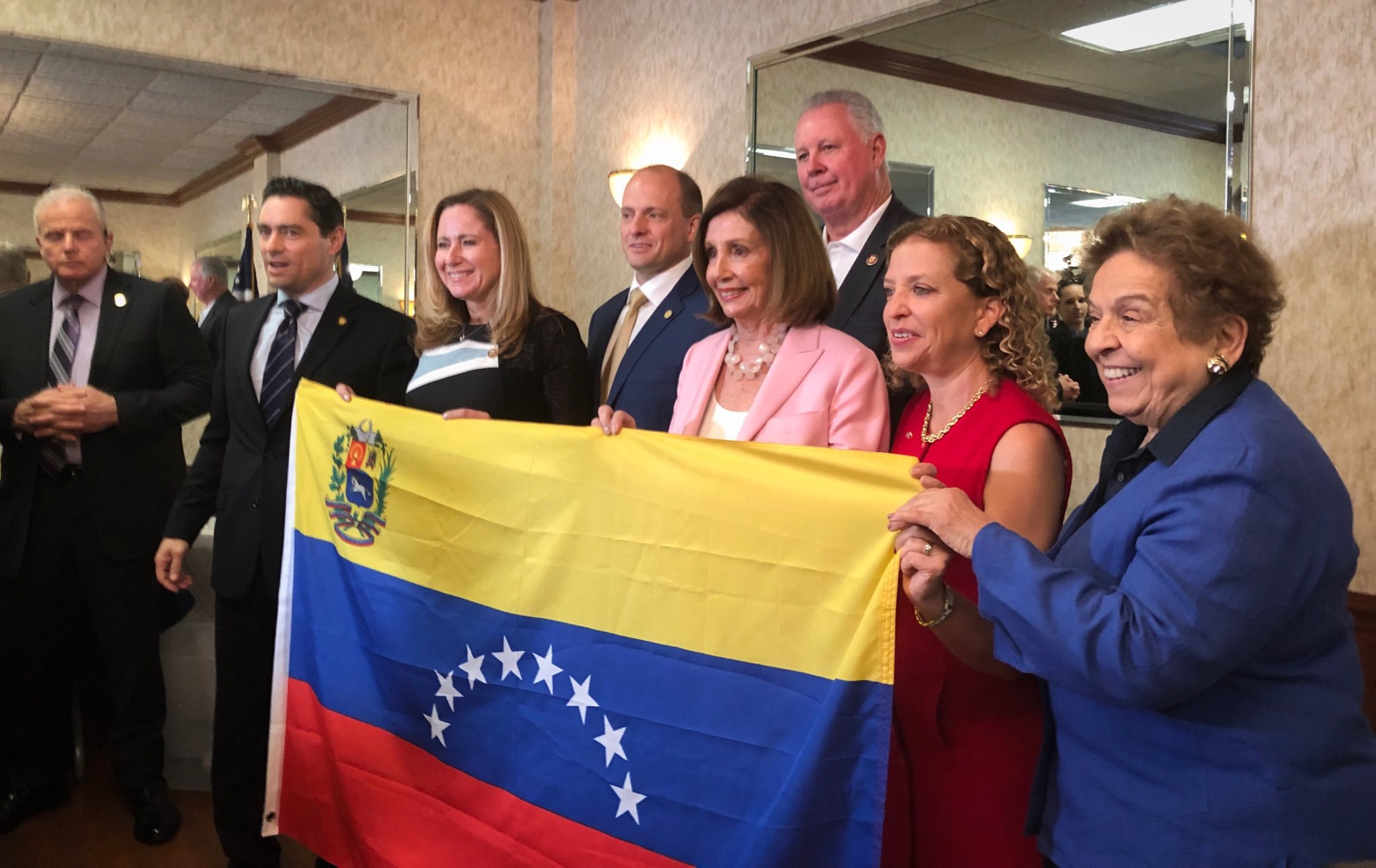
Pelosi and Rep. Debbie Wasserman Schultz have supported Venezuelan opposition leader Juan Guaidó.

=== Trump–Ukraine scandal and impeachment ===
The Democrats gained control of the House of Representatives in the November 2018 elections, and Pelosi took office as Speaker. Multiple House committees launched investigations into various actions by Trump and some of his cabinet members and requested or subpoenaed documents and information from the White House and the administration. In April 2019, Trump vowed to defy "all" subpoenas from the House and to refuse to allow current or former administration officials to testify before House committees.

Pelosi initially resisted efforts by some fellow House Democrats to pursue Trump's impeachment, but in September 2019, following revelations of the Trump–Ukraine scandal, announced the beginning of a formal House impeachment inquiry, saying "The actions taken to date by the president have seriously violated the Constitution" and that Trump "must be held accountable—no one is above the law." Privately, Pelosi expressed concern that focusing on impeachment would imperil the Democrats' House majority; she preferred to focus on other legislation.

In May 2019, the White House intervened to halt former White House Counsel Don McGahn from complying with a subpoena issued by the House Judiciary Committee, instructing the committee to redirect its records requests to the White House. Pelosi, who had previously urged "Democrats to focus on fact-finding rather than the prospect of any impeachment", described Trump's interference regarding McGahn's records as an obstruction of justice, saying that "Trump is goading us to impeach him." Later that month, as the Trump administration continued to ignore subpoenas, refuse to release documents, and encourage or order current and former officials not to testify in Congress, Pelosi declared: "we believe that the president of the United States is engaged in a cover-up." Later that day, after learning of Pelosi's comments, Trump walked away from a scheduled White House meeting with Pelosi and Schumer, in which a $2 trillion infrastructure plan was supposed to be discussed. Trump told Pelosi and Schumer he could not work with them until they stopped investigating him. Later in the day, Pelosi accused Trump of "obstructing justice" and again said he "is engaged in a cover-up". On June 5, 2019, during a meeting with senior Democrats about whether the House should launch impeachment proceeding against Trump, Pelosi said, "I don't want to see him impeached, I want to see him in prison." According to multiple sources, rather than impeachment, she wanted to see Trump lose to a Democrat in the 2020 election, following which he could be prosecuted. Eventually, under pressure from an alliance of left-wing Representatives led by Chair of the House Judiciary Committee Jerry Nadler, Pelosi backed an impeachment inquiry.

The House impeachment inquiry focused on efforts by Trump and Trump administration officials to pressure the government of Ukraine to smear former Vice President Joe Biden, a political rival of Trump's, while withholding $400 million in U.S. military aid, and a White House visit, from Ukraine; the inquiry also examined Trump's request in a July 2019 phone call to Ukrainian president Volodymyr Zelenskyy to "do us a favor" and investigate Biden. On December 18, 2019, the House voted nearly along party lines to impeach Trump for abuse of power (230–197) and obstruction of Congress (229–198), making him the third president in U.S. history to be impeached. Pelosi said, when opening debate on the articles of impeachment, "If we do not act now, we would be derelict in our duty. It is tragic that the president's reckless actions make impeachment necessary. He gave us no choice." Pelosi initially did not transmit the articles of impeachment to the Republican-controlled Senate for trial, seeking to negotiate an agreement with Senate Majority Mitch McConnell for the Senate to hear witness testimony and other additional evidence as part of a bid for a "full and fair" trial. McConnell rejected these efforts, and the House transmitted the articles to the Senate on January 15, 2020, with Pelosi naming seven Democratic Representatives, led by Representative Adam Schiff, as the House managers to argue the impeachment case against Trump in the Senate. As expected, the Senate ultimately acquitted Trump in a nearly-party line vote in which every Democrat voted for conviction and all but one Republican, Senator Mitt Romney, voting for acquittal. Ahead of the Senate vote Pelosi said that, irrespective of the outcome, the president "has been impeached forever", that the impeachment process had successfully "pulled back a veil of behavior totally unacceptable to our founders, and that the public will see this with a clearer eye, an unblurred eye." Following the Senate vote, Pelosi criticized Trump and Senate Republicans, saying their actions had "normalized lawlessness and rejected the system of checks and balances".

Following the Senate vote, Trump claimed vindication and criticized Democrats, the FBI, and Pelosi. In a speech at the National Prayer Breakfast, Trump referred to Pelosi as "a horrible person", and questioned her religious faith; Pelosi said these remarks were "particularly without class". Before Trump's February 4, 2020 State of the Union Address, the day before the Senate impeachment vote, Trump and Pelosi exchanged mutual snubs. Trump refused to shake Pelosi's outstretched hand, and Pelosi tore up her copy of Trump's speech. Her stated reason for doing so was "because it was a courteous thing to do considering the alternatives. It was a such a dirty speech." Pelosi also said Trump's speech "had no contact with reality whatsoever" and suggested the president appeared "a little sedated" during the address. Pelosi's action was criticized by Trump and others.

Days after the Senate impeachment vote, Trump fired two officials who had testified against him during the impeachment inquiry: U.S. Ambassador to the European Union Gordon Sondland and Lieutenant Colonel Alexander Vindman, a National Security Council official. Pelosi called the firing of Vindman a "shameful" and "clear and brazen act of retaliation that showcases the President's fear of the truth", saying that "History will remember Lieutenant Colonel Vindman as an American hero."

=== Commission to consider use of 25th Amendment ===
On October 8, 2020, Pelosi announced that legislation was being introduced in the House of Representatives to advance the creation of a commission to allow the use of the 25th Amendment to the Constitution to intervene and remove Trump from executive duties.

== Biden presidency ==
As of October 2022, Pelosi had voted in line with Joe Biden's stated position 100% of the time.
