= U.S. Troop Readiness, Veterans' Care, Katrina Recovery, and Iraq Accountability Appropriations Act, 2007 =

United States appropriations act

- Long title: An Act Making emergency supplemental appropriations and additional supplemental appropriations for agricultural and other emergency assistance for the fiscal year ending September 30, 2007, and for other purposes.
- Enacted by: the 110th United States Congress

Citations
- Public law: 110-028
- Statutes at Large: 121 Stat. 112

Legislative history
- Introduced in the House as H.R. 2206 by David Obey (D–WI) on May 8, 2007; Passed the House on May 10, 2007 (221–205); Passed the Senate on May 17, 2007 (Voice vote) with amendment; House agreed to Senate amendment on May 24, 2007 (No. 1 348–73, No. 2 280–142) with further amendment; Senate agreed to House amendment on May 24, 2007 (80–14); Signed into law by President George W. Bush on May 25, 2007

The U.S. Troop Readiness, Veterans' Care, Katrina Recovery, and Iraq Accountability Appropriations Act, 2007 (Pub. L. 110–28 (text) (PDF), 121 Stat. 112, enacted May 25, 2007) is an emergency appropriations act passed by the 110th United States Congress that provides funding for the Iraq War through September 30, 2007. A prior version of the act, H.R. 1591, included a timeline for withdrawal of U.S. troops from Iraq. H.R. 1591 was passed by Congress but vetoed by President George W. Bush. While the veto of H.R. 1591 could have caused delays for Iraq war expenditures, the availability of funds resulting from the passage of the Defense Appropriations Act on September 29, 2006, allowed the Department of Defense to continue Iraq War spending in the interim period between the veto of H.R. 1591 and the President's signature of approval for H.R. 2206. The Feed and Forage Act was not invoked by the U.S. government in the days prior to the passage of H.R. 2206.

Components of the U.S. Troop Readiness, Veterans' Care, Katrina Recovery, and Iraq Accountability Appropriations Act of 2007 include:

- Funding for wars in Afghanistan and Iraq (Title I)
- Disaster relief related to Hurricane Katrina (Title II)
- Elimination of the State Children's Health Insurance Program (SCHIP) shortfall and other health matters (Title VII)
- The Fair Minimum Wage Act of 2007 (Title VIII)

== Legislative history ==
The bill was passed by Congress on May 24, 2007 and signed by President Bush on May 25.

== Provisions ==
=== Formal title ===
The Act is formally entitled the "Making emergency supplemental appropriations and additional supplemental appropriations for agricultural and other emergency assistance for the fiscal year ending September 30, 2007, and for other purposes."

=== Withdrawal from Iraq ===
The Act included eighteen benchmarks for the Iraqi government to meet before the withdrawal of U.S. troops from Iraq could commence. By August 2007, Iraq had met three of the benchmarks and failed to meet the remaining fifteen according to the Government Accountability Office.

The three benchmarks met at that point were:

- Ensure the rights of minority political parties in the Iraqi legislature.
- Establish support for Baghdad Security Plan, with Iraqi troops providing security in Baghdad.
- Establish all of the 33 planned joint security stations in neighborhoods across Baghdad.

While the remaining fifteen had not been met:

- Reaching out to the Sunnis by reopening talks on the Iraqi Constitution.
- Passing a new oil law.
- Reversing the purge of former Baathists from Iraqi politics and government employment
- Dismantling sectarian Shia militias.
- Enact procedures to form semi-autonomous regions in Iraq.
- Establish an Independent High Electoral Commission, laws and a date, for provincial elections.
- Enact legislation allowing amnesty for insurgents who stop fighting.
- Ensure that Iraq's political authorities are not undermining the Iraqi Security Forces.
- Provide an additional three trained Iraqi brigades to support Baghdad operations.
- Provide Iraqi commanders with all authorities to make decisions in consultation with U.S. commanders without political intervention, to pursue all extremists including Sunni insurgents and Shiite militias.
- Ensure that Iraqi Security Forces are providing even-handed enforcement of the law.
- Ensure that the Baghdad Security Plan will not provide a safe haven for outlaws of any sectarian or political affiliation.
- Reduce the level of sectarian violence in Iraq and eliminate militia control of local security.
- Increase the number of Iraqi security forces units capable of operating independently.
- Enact legislation to ensure the equitable distribution of hydrocarbon energy resources to the people of Iraq.

=== Appropriations ===
The bill appropriated almost $95 billion to extend funding for the wars in Iraq and Afghanistan through September 30, 2007.

=== Minimum Wage ===
The Act contains additional provisions beyond the funding of the wars. It includes the Fair Minimum Wage Act of 2007 as a rider, which raises the minimum wage from $5.15 an hour to $7.25 an hour from 2007 to 2009, and contains some $4.84 billion in tax breaks for small businesses.

=== Domestic Spending for Disaster Relief ===
The bill also includes domestic spending, such as more than $6 billion for hurricane relief.

=== Tamper-resistant prescription pads ===
In addition, Title VII sets forth the first federal mandate of tamper-resistant prescription pads for Medicaid reimbursement. The requirement states that "Effective October 1, 2007; Medicaid outpatient drugs will be reimbursable only if non-electronic written prescriptions are executed on a tamper-resistant pad." The recommendation for this provision was previously enumerated by President Bush in his 2008 budget, which projected that the prevention of fraudulent prescriptions could reap $355 million in taxpayer savings. Although not objecting to the new requirement's rationale, the American Pharmacists Association (APhA) on July 17, 2007, asked the Centers for Medicare and Medicaid Services (CMS) to delay implementation because of the short timeline. In the request letter to CMS, APhA warned that the immediate implementation of the Act could potentially result in many Medicaid patients being turned away from pharmacies if not possessed of a valid prescription written on a tamper-resistant pad. The APhA's rationale for delay of tamper-resistant pads includes:

- Unrealistic to presume medical and pharmacy practice can implement the change in three months
- Delay could prevent the suffering of Medicaid patients by allowing time to prepare for the following
  - Define standards for what constitutes "tamper-resistant"
  - Educate providers, pharmacists, and patients
  - Clarify the applicability of telephone orders, electronic, and faxed prescriptions
  - Allow organizations time to appropriate resources, print, and distribute pads

Representatives Charles Wilson (D-Ohio), Marion Berry (D-Arkansas), and Mike Ross (D-Arkansas) joined APhA in representing concerns of Medicaid enrollees and pharmacies. The representatives are reported to be working on an amendment aimed at limiting the tamper-resistant pad to only controlled substances. Further, an individual with the American Medical Association was interviewed about the topic by the Associated Press. "The implementation timetable is too short to educate prescribing physicians about the new law and is also likely too short to produce and distribute the enormous quantity of new prescription pads that will be needed," said Dr. Edward Langston, chairman of the board for the American Medical Association (as reported to the Associated Press). Dr. Langston also warned that, in effect, such a rapid implementation of law threatens access to medicine. The AP article also reported that CMS spokesperson Steve Hahn indicated that there were no plans to push back the October 1 implementation date, but that the agency is talking with "health care providers" to help prepare.

== Earlier versions ==
H.R. 1591 was a bill for "Making emergency supplemental appropriations for the fiscal year ending September 30, 2007, and for other purposes". The bill was vetoed by president George W. Bush, his second veto while in office. The House of Representatives failed to override the veto, so that version of the bill died.
