= Public Law 113-34 =

Bill of the 113th U.S. Congress

- Long title: To amend Public Law 93–435 with respect to the Northern Mariana Islands, providing parity with Guam, the Virgin Islands, and American Samoa.
- Announced in: the 113th United States Congress
- Sponsored by: Senator Ron Wyden (D-OR)
- Number of co-sponsors: 1

Codification
- Acts affected: Fair Minimum Wage Act of 2007
- U.S.C. sections affected: 48 U.S.C. § 1705, 48 U.S.C. § 1706,

Legislative history
- Introduced in the Senate as S. 256 by Senator Ron Wyden (D-OR) on February 7, 2013; Committee consideration by United States Senate Committee on Energy and Natural Resources, United States Senate Energy Subcommittee on Public Lands, Forests and Mining, United States House Committee on Natural Resources, United States House Committee on Education and the Workforce; Passed the Senate on August 1, 2013 (Unanimous consent); Passed the House on September 10, 2013 (Roll Call Vote 454: 415-0)

The bill S. 256, long title "To amend Public Law 93–435 with respect to the Northern Mariana Islands, providing parity with Guam, the Virgin Islands, and American Samoa," is a bill that was introduced into the 113th United States Congress. S. 256 would convey to the government of the Commonwealth of the Northern Mariana Islands (CNMI) submerged lands surrounding such Islands and extending three geographical miles outward from their coastlines. It would also include the Commonwealth of the Northern Mariana Islands among the islands where the President may establish naval defensive sea areas and airspace reservations when necessary for national defense. Finally, it would amend the Fair Minimum Wage Act to provide for no Commonwealth of the Northern Mariana Islands minimum wage increases in 2013 and 2015.

== Provisions of the bill ==
This summary is based largely on the summary provided by the Congressional Research Service, a public domain source.

S. 256 would convey to the government of the Commonwealth of the Northern Mariana Islands (CNMI) submerged lands surrounding such Islands and extending three geographical miles outward from their coastlines. It would also include the Commonwealth of the Northern Mariana Islands among the islands where the President may establish naval defensive sea areas and airspace reservations when necessary for national defense. Finally, it would amend the Fair Minimum Wage Act to provide for no Commonwealth of the Northern Mariana Islands minimum wage increases in 2013 and 2015.

== Congressional Budget Office report ==
This summary is based largely on the summary provided by the Congressional Budget Office, a public domain source, as ordered reported by the Senate Committee on Energy and Natural Resources on May 16, 2013.

The Congressional Budget Office (CBO) estimates that enacting S. 256 would have no significant effect on the federal budget. The bill would convey ownership of submerged lands to the Commonwealth of the Northern Mariana Islands (CNMI) from the mean high tide seaward to the point that is three geographical miles from its coastline. The legislation also would include the CNMI among the islands where the United States may establish a naval defensive perimeter. Finally, S. 256 would amend the process for changing the minimum wage in American Samoa and the CNMI.

Based on information from the Department of the Interior, the CBO estimates that implementing S. 256 would have no significant cost to the federal government. Enacting the bill would not affect direct spending or revenues; therefore, pay-as-you-go procedures do not apply.

S. 256 contains no intergovernmental or private-sector mandates as defined in the Unfunded Mandates Reform Act.

On May 2, 2013, the CBO transmitted a cost estimate for H.R. 573, a bill to amend Public Law 93-435 with respect to the Northern Mariana Islands, providing parity with Guam, the Virgin Islands, and American Samoa, as ordered reported by the House Committee on Natural Resources on April 24, 2013. The two pieces of legislation are similar, and the CBO cost estimates are the same.

== Procedural history ==
=== Senate ===
S. 256 was introduced on February 7, 2013 by Senator Ron Wyden (D-OR). It was referred to the United States Senate Committee on Energy and Natural Resources and the United States Senate Energy Subcommittee on Public Lands, Forests and Mining. The Senate voted to pass the bill by unanimous consent on August 1, 2013.

=== House ===
S. 256 was received in the United States House of Representatives on August 2, 2013. It was referred to the United States House Committee on Natural Resources and the United States House Committee on Education and the Workforce. On September 10, 2013, the House voted in Roll Call Vote 454 to pass the bill 415-0.

=== President ===
S. 256 was presented to President Barack Obama on September 12, 2013.

== Debate and discussion ==
The fact that so many Democrats voted in favor of delaying a minimum wage increase in the CNMI was seen as counterintuitive by some people in light of their recent support for increasing the minimum wage to $10. The explanation given was that wages in the CNMI were rising too quickly and the economy was in too poor a state to handle another $0.50 increase.

== See also ==
- List of bills in the 113th United States Congress
- Northern Mariana Islands
- Fair Minimum Wage Act of 2007
