= 100-Hour Plan =

2006-2007 U.S. Democratic political strategy

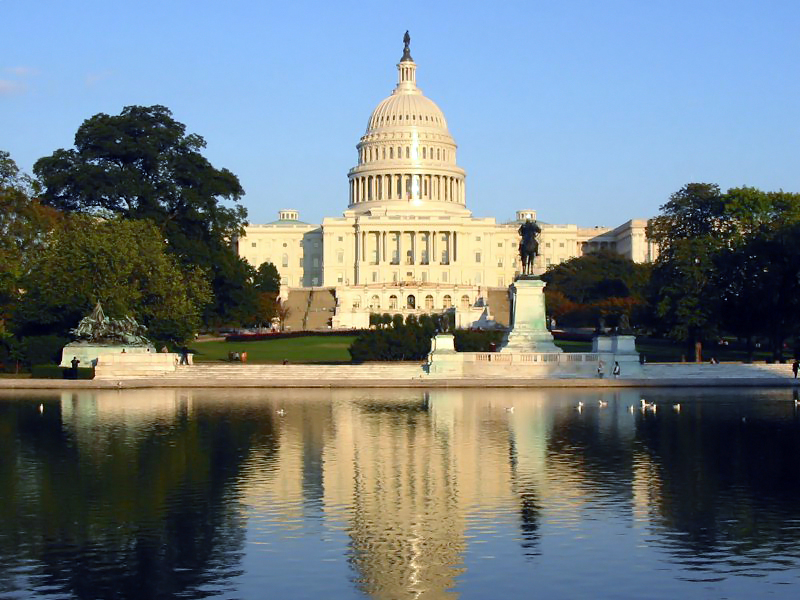
The United States Capitol in Washington, D.C.

The 100-Hour Plan was a United States Democratic Party political strategy detailing the actions the party pursued upon assuming leadership of the 110th Congress on January 4, 2007. The strategy was announced before the 2006 midterm elections. Speaker Nancy Pelosi pledged that her party would continue to pursue these goals upon her assumption of leadership. The 100-hour time period refers to business hours and not actual time, and has alternately been termed "100 legislative hours"; Pelosi's spokesman Brendan Daly defined the starting point this way: "It's when the House convenes, after the one-minutes and before the special orders."

This period began on the Tuesday (January 9, 2007) after the swearing-in ceremony on January 4. After it passes the House, most legislation still has to pass the Senate and receive the President's signature (or override his veto) to become law. The elements of the first day's proposals are House rules and therefore do not require any action from the Senate or President.

By January 18, 2007, 87 business hours after the swearing-in, the House of Representatives had passed every one of the plan's measures in the form that they had been submitted to Congress.

These measures included all of those promised, with the exception of part of one of the recommendations of the 9/11 Commission.

== Origin ==
The origin for the name of the plan is a play-on-words from former Democratic President Franklin Roosevelt who promised quick action on the part of government (to combat the Great Depression) during his "first hundred days" in office. One hundred hours was also the amount of legislative time available to Congress prior to the President's 2007 State of the Union address on Tuesday, January 23.

The plan was promised by Democrats in the days leading up to the 2006 midterm elections in the United States, in which the Democratic Party won control of both houses of Congress (in the House by a margin of 233–202 and in the Senate by a margin of 51–49—both independent senators caucus with the 49 Democrats) after twelve years of Republican control (January 1995 to January 2007). Twelve years earlier, in January 1995, the Republicans had articulated their own legislative plan which they called The Contract with America.

== Components ==
The plan as outlined by Speaker Pelosi is as follows:

Day one

- "Break the link between lobbyists and legislation" with new House rules

Further enumerated to: "Curb lobbyists' influence by banning meals and gifts to lawmakers and requiring more disclosure and oversight."
Resolution Adopting the Rules of the House of Representatives for the 110th Congress (H.Res. 6), passed 280-232 on January 4, 2007
Signed into law on December 19, 2007 by President Bush

- Institute a "pay-as-you-go" policy to reduce the deficit

Passed 430–1 as Title II of the Resolution Adopting the Rules of the House of Representatives for the 110th Congress (H.Res. 6), on January 4, 2007

Day two

- Enact all 9/11 Commission recommendations made in the 9/11 Commission Report

Further enumerated to: "Implement unfulfilled recommendations of the September 11th Commission and beef up port security."
Implementing Recommendations of the 9/11 Commission Act of 2007 (H.R. 1), passed 299–128 on January 9, 2007
Senate passed 60–38 as S. 4 on March 13, 2007.
Signed into law on August 3, 2007 by President Bush.

Day three

- Raise the federal minimum wage to $7.25 an hour ($10.89 in 2024 dollars).

Fair Minimum Wage Act of 2007 (H.R. 2), passed 315–116 on January 10, 2007
Senate passed 94–3 on February 1, 2007.
Signed into law on May 25, 2007 by President Bush.

Day four

- Grant federal funding to a wide variety of stem cell research projects

Further enumerated to: "Pass another bill that allows expanded federal funding for embryonic stem-cell research, betting on better prospects for an override if the president vetoes it again."
Stem Cell Research Enhancement Act of 2007 (H.R. 3), passed 253–174 on January 11, 2007
Died in Senate.

- Allow the government to negotiate directly with pharmaceutical companies, securing lower drug prices for Medicare patients.

Further enumerated to: "Reduce prescription-drug prices for seniors by requiring Medicare to negotiate rates with pharmaceutical companies."
Medicare Prescription Drug Price Negotiation Act of 2007, H.R. 4, passed 255–170 on January 12, 2007
Died in Senate committee.

Day five

- Cut interest rates on student loans in half

College Student Relief Act of 2007 (H.R. 5) passed 356–71 on January 17, 2007
Died in Senate committee.

Day six

- End large tax subsidies for large oil companies, for the reasons outlined above and also to help foster energy independence

Energy Independence and Security Act of 2007 (H.R. 6) passed 264–163 on January 18, 2007
Senate passed 65–27 on June 21, 2007.
Signed into law on December 19, 2007 by President Bush

== Divergence from 9/11 Commission's recommendations ==
House Democratic leaders included all but one of the recommendations of the bipartisan 9/11 Commission in H.R. 1. In particular, the reorganization of Congressional committees with responsibility for funding and oversight of the nation's intelligence agencies was rejected by Democratic leaders as early as November 2006, immediately after the election. The commission also suggested removing term limits in favor of expertise and continuity, but Pelosi explicitly rejected this proposal, invoking terms limits when blocking Jane Harman from serving as chair of the Intelligence Committee.

== Political responses ==
The plan drew both praise and criticism. One of the 100-Hour Plan's greatest opponents was the preceding Republican House Speaker Dennis Hastert, who said of Speaker Pelosi's intended changes that, "By repealing President Bush's tax relief, she would devastate economic prosperity for Americans and burden taxpayers at all levels."

The plan was also criticized as being unrealistic, "because the Senate's rules give the minority party more power than the House does to slow down legislation, it could be weeks or months before final action on some of the House's proposed measures takes place."
