= Fair Minimum Wage Act of 2007 =

United States wage law

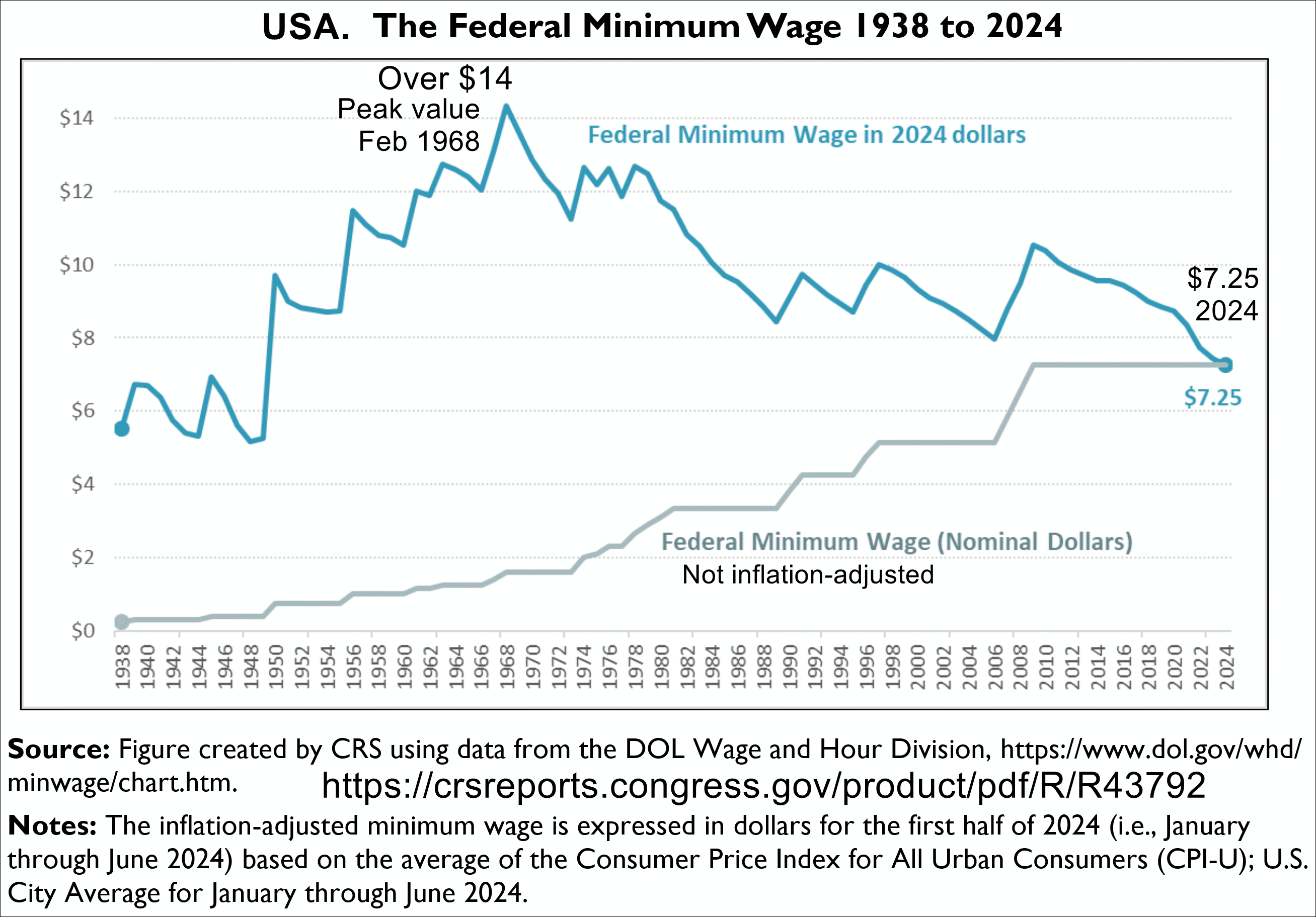
History of the US federal minimum wage. Lower line is nominal dollars. Top line is inflation-adjusted.

The Fair Minimum Wage Act of 2007 is an act of Congress that amended the Fair Labor Standards Act of 1938 to gradually raise the federal minimum wage from $5.15 per hour to $7.25 per hour. It was signed into law on May 25, 2007 as part of the U.S. Troop Readiness, Veterans' Care, Katrina Recovery, and Iraq Accountability Appropriations Act, 2007. The act raised the federal minimum wage in 3 increments: to $5.85 per hour 60 days after enactment (July 24, 2007), to $6.55 per hour a year later (July 24, 2008), and finally to $7.25 per hour two years later (July 24, 2009). In addition, the act provided for the Northern Mariana Islands and American Samoa to make the transition to the federal minimum wage on alternate timetables.

As of 2008, 13 states already had minimum wage rates at or above $7.25 per hour. These states were therefore unaffected by the increase.

== Legislative history ==
The act was a component of the new Democratic majority's 100-Hour Plan in the United States House of Representatives. It was introduced into the House on January 5, 2007, by George Miller (D-CA) and it was passed by the House on January 10. All 233 House Democrats voted "Aye," and 82 Republicans joined them. 116 Republican representatives voted "No," and 4 representatives did not vote. President Bush advised that the bill should include tax cuts for small businesses that could be harmed by the wage increase, and on January 24, 2007, a cloture motion in the Senate failed as 43 Republican Senators (all but 5) rejected the bill without the tax cuts, opposing all 47 Democrats who were present for the vote. Once tax cuts were added to the bill, the Senate passed the amended bill 94-3 (3 Republicans opposed and 1 did not vote; 2 Democrats did not vote) on February 1, 2007.

American Samoa Exemption

The act initially did not amend the Fair Labor Standards Act of 1938 in regards to American Samoa—its minimum wage would have continued to be set by a committee appointed by the U.S. Department of Labor, as it has been since 1938. This prompted accusations from Republican lawmakers who claimed that Speaker of the House Nancy Pelosi had personally requested the exemption as a favor for the company StarKist Tuna, which owned one of two tuna canneries in America Samoa and employed about 75% of the territory's workforce, and was headquartered in San Francisco, in Pelosi's home district.

In reality, the exemption had been requested by representative Eni Faleomavaega, the non-voting delegate from American Samoa, out of concern for the effects the bill would have on the Samoan economy. Addressing Congress, Faleomavagea noted that the territory had not been subject to the mainland minimum wage for 50 years and said, "the global tuna industry is so competitive that it is no longer possible for the federal government to demand mainland minimum wage rates for American Samoa without causing the collapse of our economy".

Following this, the bill was amended, and the final version covered all U.S. Territories, including American Somoa.

=== Final passage ===
The minimum wage was passed by the House and the Senate on May 24, 2007 as part of HR 2206, the supplemental aid to the Iraq War. As part of the deal, $257 million worth of tax breaks were given to small business over a 10-year period to offset the wage increase. The bill was thus ultimately enacted as a rider to the U.S. Troop Readiness, Veterans' Care, Katrina Recovery, and Iraq Accountability Appropriations Act, 2007. President George W. Bush signed the bill on the next day.

=== Proposed amendments ===
- The bill S. 256, To amend Public Law 93–435 with respect to the Northern Mariana Islands, providing parity with Guam, the Virgin Islands, and American Samoa (S. 256; 113th Congress), is a bill that was introduced into the 113th United States Congress. S. 256 would amend the Fair Minimum Wage Act to provide for no Commonwealth of the Northern Mariana Islands minimum wage increases in 2013 and 2015.

== Omissions ==
The minimum wage increase did not change the tip credit for tipped employees. Originally, it was automatically increased by being pegged to a percentage of the regular minimum wage. However, that changed during the 1990s. The federal tip credit, therefore, remains at $2.13. However, as even tipped employees are subject to the higher of State or Federal wage by law tipped staff effectively benefit from the minimum wage increase just the same.

== See also ==
- Minimum wage in the United States
