= Feed and Forage Act =

United States legislation

The Feed and Forage Act of 1861 is legislation passed by the United States Congress that allows the Military Departments to incur obligations in excess of available appropriations for clothing, subsistence, fuel, quarters, transportation and medical supplies. This provision is currently codified in 41 U.S.C. § 6301 (previously 41 U.S.C. § 11 and section 3732 of the Revised Statutes). It also authorizes incurring deficiencies for costs of additional members of the Armed Forces on active duty-beyond the number for which funds are currently provided in DoD appropriations (Title 10 U.S.C.).

This authority requires Congressional notification and does not permit actual expenditures until Congress provides an appropriation of the required funds.

== History ==
The act has been amended over time and now, as codified at 41 U.S.C. § 6301, reads:

(a) In General.—A contract or purchase on behalf of the Federal Government shall not be made unless the contract or purchase is authorized by law or is under an appropriation adequate to its fulfillment.

(b) Exception.—

(1) Definition.—In this subsection, the term “defined Secretary” means—

(A) the Secretary of Defense; or
(B) the Secretary of Homeland Security with respect to the Coast Guard when the Coast Guard is not operating as a service in the Navy.

(2) In general.—Subsection (a) does not apply to a contract or purchase made by a defined Secretary for clothing, subsistence, forage, fuel, quarters, transportation, or medical and hospital supplies.
(3) Current year limitation.—A contract or purchase made by a defined Secretary under this subsection may not exceed the necessities of the current year.
(4) Reports.—The defined Secretary shall immediately advise Congress when authority is exercised under this subsection. The defined Secretary shall report quarterly on the estimated obligations incurred pursuant to the authority granted in this subsection.

(c) Special Rule for Purchase of Land.—Land may not be purchased by the Federal Government unless the purchase is authorized by law.

It has been invoked on a number of occasions to deal with emergencies.

- It was cited on several occasions to support the Vietnam War.
- In 1990, $1.6 billion was obligated under the act during Operation Desert Shield.
- In 1994, the act was invoked to support of Operation Restore Democracy in Haiti.
- In 1996, the act was invoked after the Khobar Towers bombing although ultimately no funds were obligated under it.
- In 2001, act was invoked immediately after the September 11 terrorist attacks. Notably, Congress acted swiftly enough that an appropriations bill was enacted prior to DOD obligating any funding under the act.

== Controversy ==
There is a controversy over whether, and the extent to which, the Act lets a President fund military operations for which Congress has not appropriated funds.

In November 2006, member of Congress and presidential candidate Dennis Kucinich wrote that the President could cite the Act to continue the Iraq War even if Congress withheld funds. In May 2007, the National Journal published an article echoing this argument.

In response, OmbWatch.org published "Exploring the Scope of the Feed and Forage Act of 1861" suggesting a more limited interpretation:

... interpreting the Feed and Forage Act broadly probably gives great flexibility to Department of Defense officials to obtain anything they deem necessary, so long as it is for a short-term need that occurred in an emergency, could not be feasibly obtained through normal procedures, and was used in the fiscal year in which it was obtained. This interpretation would give Congress and the president much more, if not unlimited, time to negotiate a compromise...

Others have argued that the Act cannot allow the President to continue military operations where Congress has used its Power of the purse to end them. It is argued that the intent of the Framers was that "the whole power of raising armies was lodged in the LEGISLATURE, not in the EXECUTIVE" The Department of Defense's Financial Management Regulations notes that : "The Department shall limit its use of the authority in 41 U.S.C 11 to emergency circumstances."

== Name Confusion ==
Many sources refer to a "Food and Forage Act" but the name used by the U.S. Government is "Feed and Forage Act".
