= List of acts of the 110th United States Congress =

The 110th United States Congress enacted the following laws:

== Summary of actions ==
President George W. Bush vetoed the following acts of this Congress. (List of United States presidential vetoes#George W. Bush).

1. May 1, 2007: Vetoed H.R. 1591, U.S. Troop Readiness, Veterans' Care, Katrina Recovery, and Iraq Accountability Appropriations Act, 2007. Override attempt failed in House, 222–203. A later version of the bill that excluded certain aspects of the initial legislation that the president disapproved of H.R. 2206, was enacted as Pub.L. 110–28 with the president's approval.
2. June 20, 2007: Vetoed S. 5, Stem Cell Research Enhancement Act of 2007. No override attempt made.
3. October 3, 2007: Vetoed H.R. 976, Children's Health Insurance Program Reauthorization Act of 2007 ("SCHIP"). Override attempt failed in House, 273–156.
4. November 2, 2007: Vetoed H.R. 1495, Water Resources Development Act of 2007. Overridden by House, 361–54. Overridden by Senate, 79–14 (62 needed), and enacted as Pub.L. 110–114 over the president's veto.
5. November 13, 2007: Vetoed H.R. 3043, Departments of Labor, Health and Human Services, and Education, and Related Agencies Appropriations Act of 2008. Override attempt failed in House, 277–141.
6. December 12, 2007: Vetoed H.R. 3963, Children's Health Insurance Program Reauthorization Act of 2007. Override attempt failed in House, 260–152.
7. December 28, 2007: Vetoed H.R. 1585, National Defense Authorization Act for Fiscal Year 2008. No override attempt made. A later version of the bill that changed a minor provision of which the president disapproved was quickly passed by Congress (H.R. 4986) and was enacted with the president's approval as Pub.L. 110–181 on January 28, 2008.
8. March 8, 2008: Vetoed H.R. 2082, Intelligence Authorization Act for Fiscal Year 2008. Override attempt failed in House, 225–188.
9. May 21, 2008: Vetoed H.R. 2419, 2007 U.S. Farm Bill. re-passed by Congress to correct a clerical error in HR 2419. Overridden by House, 317–109. Overridden by Senate, 80–14. Enacted as Pub.L. 110–246 over the president's veto. Due to a clerical error, this act was repealed by Pub.L. 110-246.
10. June 18, 2008: Vetoed H.R. 6124, 2007 U.S. Farm Bill. re-passed by Congress to correct a clerical error in HR 2419. Overridden by House, 317–109. Overridden by Senate, 80–14. Enacted as Pub.L. 110–246 over the president's veto. Due to a clerical error, this act was repealed by Pub.L. 110-246.
11. July 15, 2008: Vetoed H.R. 6631, Medicare Improvements for Patients and Providers Act of 2008. Overridden by House, 383–41. Overridden by Senate, 70–26. Enacted as Pub.L. 110–275 over the president's veto.

== Public laws ==
PL#	Date enacted	Short title	Long title
Pub. L. 110–1 (text) (PDF)	January 17, 2007	(No short title)	To redesignate the White Rocks National Recreation Area in the State of Vermont as the "Robert T. Stafford White Rocks National Recreation Area".
Pub. L. 110–2 (text) (PDF)	February 2, 2007	House Page Board Revision Act of 2007	To revise the composition of the House of Representatives Page Board to equalize the number of members representing the majority and minority parties and to include a member representing the parents of pages and a member representing former pages, and for other purposes.
Pub. L. 110–3 (text) (PDF)	February 8, 2007	(No short title)	To provide a new effective date for the applicability of certain provisions of law to Public Law 105-331.
Pub. L. 110–4 (text) (PDF)	February 15, 2007	(No short title)	To provide for an additional temporary extension of programs under the Small Business Act and the Small Business Investment Act of 1958 through July 31, 2007.
Pub. L. 110–5 (text) (PDF)	February 15, 2007	Revised Continuing Appropriations Resolution, 2007	Making further continuing appropriations for the fiscal year 2007, and for other purposes.
Pub. L. 110–6 (text) (PDF)	February 26, 2007	Antitrust Modernization Commission Extension Act of 2007	To amend the Antitrust Modernization Commission Act of 2002, to extend the term of the Antitrust Modernization Commission and to make a technical correction.
Pub. L. 110–7 (text) (PDF)	March 7, 2007	(No short title)	To designate the facility of the United States Postal Service located at 1300 North Frontage Road West in Vail, Colorado, as the "Gerald R. Ford, Jr. Post Office Building".
Pub. L. 110–8 (text) (PDF)	March 7, 2007	(No short title)	To designate the facility of the United States Postal Service located at 152 North 5th Street in Laramie, Wyoming, as the "Gale W. McGee Post Office".
Pub. L. 110–9 (text) (PDF)	March 7, 2007	(No short title)	To designate the facility of the United States Postal Service located at 1700 Main Street in Little Rock, Arkansas, as the "Scipio A. Jones Post Office Building".
Pub. L. 110–10 (text) (PDF)	March 7, 2007	(No short title)	To designate the facility of the United States Postal Service located at 16150 Aviation Loop Drive in Brooksville, Florida, as the "Sergeant Lea Robert Mills Brooksville Aviation Branch Post Office".
Pub. L. 110–11 (text) (PDF)	March 7, 2007	(No short title)	To designate the facility of the United States Postal Service located at 3903 South Congress Avenue in Austin, Texas, as the "Sergeant Henry Ybarra III Post Office Building".
Pub. L. 110–12 (text) (PDF)	March 15, 2007	(No short title)	To designate the facility of the United States Postal Service located at 2633 11th Street in Rock Island, Illinois, as the "Lane Evans Post Office Building".
Pub. L. 110–13 (text) (PDF)	March 21, 2007	(No short title)	To designate the United States courthouse located at 555 Independence Street in Cape Girardeau, Missouri, as the 'Rush Hudson Limbaugh, Sr. United States Courthouse".
Pub. L. 110–14 (text) (PDF)	March 21, 2007	(No short title)	To designate the United States courthouse at South Federal Place in Santa Fe, New Mexico, as the "Santiago E. Campos United States Courthouse".
Pub. L. 110–15 (text) (PDF)	March 23, 2007	(No short title)	To designate the Federal building located at 400 Maryland Avenue Southwest in the District of Columbia as the "Lyndon Baines Johnson Department of Education Building".
Pub. L. 110–16 (text) (PDF)	March 28, 2007	(No short title)	To provide for the construction, operation, and maintenance of an arterial road in St. Louis County, Missouri.
Pub. L. 110–17 (text) (PDF)	April 9, 2007	NATO Freedom Consolidation Act of 2007	To endorse further enlargement of the North Atlantic Treaty Organization (NATO) and to facilitate the timely admission of new members to NATO, and for other purposes.
Pub. L. 110–18 (text) (PDF)	April 20, 2007	National Breast and Cervical Cancer Early Detection Program Reauthorization Act of 2007	To amend the Public Health Service Act to provide waivers relating to grants for preventive health measures with respect to breast and cervical cancers.
Pub. L. 110–19 (text) (PDF)	April 23, 2007	Older Americans Reauthorization Technical Corrections Act	To amend the Older Americans Act of 1965 to reinstate certain provisions relating to the nutrition services incentive program.
Pub. L. 110–20 (text) (PDF)	May 2, 2007	(No short title)	To redesignate the Federal building located at 167 North Main Street in Memphis, Tennessee, as the "Clifford Davis and Odell Horton Federal Building".
Pub. L. 110–21 (text) (PDF)	May 2, 2007	(No short title)	To amend the Foreign Affairs Reform and Restructuring Act of 1998 to reauthorize the United States Advisory Commission on Public Diplomacy.
Pub. L. 110–22 (text) (PDF)	May 3, 2007	Animal Fighting Prohibition Enforcement Act of 2007	To amend title 18, United States Code, to strengthen prohibitions against animal fighting, and for other purposes.
Pub. L. 110–23 (text) (PDF)	May 3, 2007	Trauma Care Systems Planning and Development Act of 2007	To amend the Public Health Service Act to add requirements regarding trauma care, and for other purposes.
Pub. L. 110–24 (text) (PDF)	May 3, 2007	Judicial Disclosure Responsibility Act	To amend the Ethics in Government Act of 1978 to extend the authority to withhold from public availability a financial disclosure report filed by an individual who is a judicial officer or judicial employee, to the extent necessary to protect the safety of that individual or a family member of that individual, and for other purposes.
Pub. L. 110–25 (text) (PDF)	May 8, 2007	(No short title)	To designate the Federal building and United States courthouse and customhouse located at 515 West First Street in Duluth, Minnesota as the "Gerald W. Heaney Federal Building and United States Courthouse and Customhouse".
Pub. L. 110–26 (text) (PDF)	May 11, 2007	American National Red Cross Governance Modernization Act of 2007	To amend the Congressional Charter of The American National Red Cross to modernize its governance structure, to enhance the ability of the board of governors of The American National Red Cross to support the critical mission of The American National Red Cross in the 21st century, and for other purposes.
Pub. L. 110–27 (text) (PDF)	May 25, 2007	(No short title)	To designate the Federal building and United States courthouse and customhouse located at 5757 Tilton Avenue in Riverside, California, as the "Lieutenant Todd Jason Bryant Post Office".
Pub. L. 110–28 (text) (PDF)	May 25, 2007	U.S. Troop Readiness, Veterans' Care, Katrina Recovery, and Iraq Accountability Appropriations Act, 2007	Making emergency supplemental appropriations and additional supplemental appropriations for agricultural and other emergency assistance for the fiscal year ending September 30, 2007, and for other purposes.
Pub. L. 110–29 (text) (PDF)	June 1, 2007	(No short title)	To designate the facility of the United States Postal Service located at 60 Calle McKinley, West in Mayaguez, Puerto Rico, as the "Miguel Angel Garcia Mendez Post Office Building".
Pub. L. 110–30 (text) (PDF)	June 1, 2007	(No short title)	To designate the facility of the United States Postal Service located at 500 West Eisenhower Street in Rio Grande City, Texas, as the "Lino Perez, Jr. Post Office".
Pub. L. 110–31 (text) (PDF)	June 1, 2007	(No short title)	To designate the facility of the United States Postal Service located at 4230 Maine Avenue in Baldwin Park, California, as the "Atanacio Haro-Marin Post Office".
Pub. L. 110–32 (text) (PDF)	June 1, 2007	(No short title)	To designate the facility of the United States Postal Service located at 320 South Lecanto Highway in Lecanto, Florida, as the "Sergeant Dennis J. Flanagan Lecanto Post Office Building".
Pub. L. 110–33 (text) (PDF)	June 1, 2007	(No short title)	To amend the District of Columbia Home Rule Act to conform the District charter to revisions made by the Council of the District of Columbia relating to public education.
Pub. L. 110–34 (text) (PDF)	June 14, 2007	Preserving United States Attorney Independence Act of 2007	To amend chapter 35 of title 28, United States Code, to preserve the independence of United States attorneys.
Pub. L. 110–35 (text) (PDF)	June 15, 2007	Preservation Approval Process Improvement Act of 2007	To suspend the requirements of the Department of Housing and Urban Development regarding electronic filing of previous participation certificates and regarding filing of such certificates with respect to certain low-income housing investors.
Pub. L. 110–36 (text) (PDF)	June 15, 2007	(No short title)	To increase the number of Iraqi and Afghani translators and interpreters who may be admitted to the United States as special immigrants, and for other purposes.
Pub. L. 110–37 (text) (PDF)	June 18, 2007	Native American Home Ownership Opportunity Act of 2007	To reauthorize the program of the Secretary of Housing and Urban Development for loan guarantees for Indian housing.
Pub. L. 110–38 (text) (PDF)	June 21, 2007	(No short title)	To provide that the executive director of the Inter-American Development Bank or the alternate executive director of the Inter-American Development Bank may serve on the board of directors of the Inter-American Foundation.
Pub. L. 110–39 (text) (PDF)	June 21, 2007	(No short title)	To authorize the transfer of certain funds from the Senate Gift Shop Revolving Fund to the Senate Employee Child Care Center.
Pub. L. 110–40 (text) (PDF)	June 29, 2007	(No short title)	To repeal certain sections of the Act of May 26, 1936, pertaining to the Virgin Islands.
Pub. L. 110–41 (text) (PDF)	June 29, 2007	Army Specialist Joseph P. Micks Federal Flag Code Amendment Act of 2007	To amend title 4, United States Code, to authorize the Governor of a State, territory, or possession of the United States to order that the National flag be flown at half-staff in that State, territory, or possession in the event of the death of a member of the Armed Forces from that State, territory, or possession who dies while serving on active duty.
Pub. L. 110–42 (text) (PDF)	June 30, 2007	(No short title)	To extend the authorities of the Andean Trade Preference Act until February 29, 2008
Pub. L. 110–43 (text) (PDF)	July 3, 2007	(No short title)	To designate the facility of the United States Postal Service located at 127 East Locust Street in Fairbury, Illinois, as the "Dr. Francis Townsend Post Office Building".
Pub. L. 110–44 (text) (PDF)	July 3, 2007	First Higher Education Extension Act of 2007	To temporarily extend the programs under the Higher Education Act of 1965, and for other purposes.
Pub. L. 110–45 (text) (PDF)	July 5, 2007	(No short title)	To redesignate a Federal building in Albuquerque, New Mexico, as the "Raymond G. Murphy Department of Veterans Affairs Medical Center".
Pub. L. 110–46 (text) (PDF)	July 5, 2007	(No short title)	To designate a United States courthouse located in Fresno, California, as the "Robert E. Coyle United States Courthouse".
Pub. L. 110–47 (text) (PDF)	July 13, 2007	Grand Teton National Park Extension Act of 2007	To modify the boundaries of Grand Teton National Park to include certain land within the GT Park Subdivision, and for other purposes.
Pub. L. 110–48 (text) (PDF)	July 18, 2007	(No short title)	To provide for the extension of transitional medical assistance (TMA) and the abstinence education program through the end of fiscal year 2007, and for other purposes
Pub. L. 110–49 (text) (PDF)	July 26, 2007	Foreign Investment and National Security Act of 2007	To ensure national security while promoting foreign investment and the creation and maintenance of jobs, to reform the process by which such investments are examined for any effect they may have on national security, to establish the Committee on Foreign Investment in the United States, and for other purposes.
Pub. L. 110–50 (text) (PDF)	July 30, 2007	Passport Backlog Reduction Act of 2007	To enable the Department of State to respond to a critical shortage of passport processing personnel, and for other purposes.
Pub. L. 110–51 (text) (PDF)	July 31, 2007	Second Higher Education Extension Act of 2007	To temporarily extend the programs under the Higher Education Act of 1965, and for other purposes.
Pub. L. 110–52 (text) (PDF)	August 1, 2007	(No short title)	Approving the renewal of import restrictions contained in the Burmese Freedom and Democracy Act of 2003, and for other purposes
Pub. L. 110–53 (text) (PDF)	August 3, 2007	Implementing Recommendations of the 9/11 Commission Act of 2007	To provide for the implementation of the recommendations of the 9/11 Commission.
Pub. L. 110–54 (text) (PDF)	August 3, 2007	(No short title)	To amend title XVIII of the Social Security Act to provide an exception to the 60-day limit on Medicare reciprocal billing arrangements between two physicians during the period in which one of the physicians is ordered to active duty as a member of a reserve component of the Armed Forces.
Pub. L. 110–55 (text) (PDF)	August 5, 2007	Protect America Act of 2007	To amend the Foreign Intelligence Surveillance Act of 1978 to provide additional procedures for authorizing certain acquisitions of foreign intelligence information and for other purposes.
Pub. L. 110–56 (text) (PDF)	August 6, 2007	(No short title)	To authorize additional funds for emergency repairs and reconstruction of the Interstate I-35 bridge located in Minneapolis, Minnesota, that collapsed on August 1, 2007, to waive the $100,000,000 limitation on emergency relief funds for those emergency repairs and reconstruction, and for other purposes
Pub. L. 110–57 (text) (PDF)	August 8, 2007	(No short title)	To provide for an additional temporary extension of programs under the Small Business Act and the Small Business Investment Act of 1958 through December 15, 2007, and for other purposes
Pub. L. 110–58 (text) (PDF)	August 9, 2007	(No short title)	To designate the facility of the United States Postal Service located at 6301 Highway 58 in Harrison, Tennessee, as the "Claude Ramsey Post Office".
Pub. L. 110–59 (text) (PDF)	August 9, 2007	(No short title)	To designate the facility of the United States Postal Service located at 508 East Main Street in Seneca, South Carolina, as the "S/Sgt Lewis G. Watkins Post Office Building".
Pub. L. 110–60 (text) (PDF)	August 9, 2007	(No short title)	To designate the facility of the United States Postal Service located at 118 Minner Avenue in Bakersfield, California, as the "Buck Owens Post Office".
Pub. L. 110–61 (text) (PDF)	August 9, 2007	(No short title)	To designate the facility of the United States Postal Service located at 4551 East 52nd Street in Odessa, Texas, as the "Staff Sergeant Marvin 'Rex' Young Post Office Building".
Pub. L. 110–62 (text) (PDF)	August 9, 2007	(No short title)	To designate the facility of the United States Postal Service located at 896 Pittsburgh Street in Springdale, Pennsylvania, as the "Rachel Carson Post Office Building".
Pub. L. 110–63 (text) (PDF)	August 9, 2007	(No short title)	To designate the facility of the United States Postal Service located at 561 Kingsland Avenue in University City, Missouri, as the "Harriett F. Woods Post Office Building".
Pub. L. 110–64 (text) (PDF)	August 9, 2007	(No short title)	To designate the facility of the United States Postal Service located at 601 Banyan Trail in Boca Raton, Florida, as the "Leonard W. Herman Post Office".
Pub. L. 110–65 (text) (PDF)	August 9, 2007	(No short title)	To designate the facility of the United States Postal Service located at 11033 South State Street in Chicago, Illinois, as the "Willye B. White Post Office Building".
Pub. L. 110–66 (text) (PDF)	August 9, 2007	(No short title)	To designate the facility of the United States Postal Service located at 20805 State Route 125 in Blue Creek, Ohio, as the "George B. Lewis Post Office Building".
Pub. L. 110–67 (text) (PDF)	August 9, 2007	(No short title)	To designate the facility of the United States Postal Service located at 14536 State Route 136 in Cherry Fork, Ohio, as the "Staff Sergeant Omer 'O.T.' Hawkins Post Office".
Pub. L. 110–68 (text) (PDF)	August 9, 2007	(No short title)	To designate the facility of the United States Postal Service located at 408 West 6th Street in Chelsea, Oklahoma, as the "Clem Rogers McSpadden Post Office Building".
Pub. L. 110–69 (text) (PDF)	August 9, 2007	America COMPETES Act or the America Creating Opportunities to Meaningfully Promote Excellence in Technology, Education, and Science Act.	To invest in innovation through research and development, and to improve the competitiveness of the United States.
Pub. L. 110–70 (text) (PDF)	August 9, 2007	(No short title)	To designate the facility of the United States Postal Service located at 3916 Milgen Road in Columbus, Georgia, as the "Frank G. Lumpkin, Jr. Post Office Building".
Pub. L. 110–71 (text) (PDF)	August 9, 2007	(No short title)	To designate the facility of the United States Postal Service located at 309 East Linn Street in Marshalltown, Iowa, as the "Major Scott Nisely Post Office".
Pub. L. 110–72 (text) (PDF)	August 9, 2007	(No short title)	To designate the facility of the United States Postal Service located at 301 Boardwalk Drive in Fort Collins, Colorado, as the "Dr. Karl E. Carson Post Office Building".
Pub. L. 110–73 (text) (PDF)	August 9, 2007	(No short title)	To designate the facility of the United States Postal Service located at 103 South Getty Street in Uvalde, Texas, as the "Dolph Briscoe, Jr. Post Office Building'.
Pub. L. 110–74 (text) (PDF)	August 9, 2007	(No short title)	To amend chapter 89 of title 5, United States Code, to make individuals employed by the Roosevelt Campobello International Park Commission eligible to obtain Federal health insurance.
Pub. L. 110–75 (text) (PDF)	August 13, 2007	(No short title)	To authorize the Coquille Indian Tribe of the State of Oregon to convey land and interests in land owned by the Tribe.
Pub. L. 110–76 (text) (PDF)	August 13, 2007	(No short title)	To authorize the Saginaw Chippewa Tribe of Indians of the State of Michigan to convey land and interests in land owned by the Tribe.
Pub. L. 110–77 (text) (PDF)	August 13, 2007	(No short title)	To improve the use of a grant of a parcel of land to the State of Idaho for use as an agricultural college, and for other purposes.
Pub. L. 110–78 (text) (PDF)	August 13, 2007	(No short title)	To waive application of the Indian Self-Determination and Education Assistance Act to a specific parcel of real property transferred by the United States to 2 Indian tribes in the State of Oregon, and for other purposes.
Pub. L. 110–79 (text) (PDF)	August 13, 2007	(No short title)	Granting the consent and approval of Congress to an interstate forest fire protection compact.
Pub. L. 110–80 (text) (PDF)	August 13, 2007	(No short title)	To amend the U.S. Troop Readiness, Veterans' Care, Katrina Recovery, and Iraq Accountability Appropriations Act, 2007, to strike a requirement relating to forage producers.
Pub. L. 110–81 (text) (PDF)	September 14, 2007	Honest Leadership and Open Government Act of 2007	To provide greater transparency in the legislative process.
Pub. L. 110–82 (text) (PDF)	September 20, 2007	Native American $1 Coin Act	To require the Secretary of the Treasury to mint and issue coins in commemoration of Native Americans and the important contributions made by Indian tribes and individual Native Americans to the development of the United States and the history of the United States, and for other purposes.
Pub. L. 110–83 (text) (PDF)	September 20, 2007	United States-Poland Parliamentary Youth Exchange Program Act of 2007	To establish a United States-Poland parliamentary youth exchange program, and for other purposes.
Pub. L. 110–84 (text) (PDF)	September 27, 2007	College Cost Reduction and Access Act	To provide for reconciliation pursuant to section 601 of the concurrent resolution on the budget for fiscal year 2008.
Pub. L. 110–85 (text) (PDF)	September 27, 2007	Food and Drug Administration Amendments Act of 2007	To amend the Federal Food, Drug, and Cosmetic Act to revise and extend the user-fee programs for prescription drugs and for medical devices, to enhance the postmarket authorities of the Food and Drug Administration with respect to the safety of drugs, and for other purposes.
Pub. L. 110–86 (text) (PDF)	September 27, 2007	(No short title)	Ro provide authority to the Peace Corps to provide separation pay for host country resident personal services contractors of the Peace Corps.
Pub. L. 110–87 (text) (PDF)	September 28, 2007	(No short title)	To designate the facility of the United States Postal Service located at 365 West 125th Street in New York, New York, as the "Percy Sutton Post Office Building".
Pub. L. 110–88 (text) (PDF)	September 28, 2007	(No short title)	To designate a portion of Interstate Route 395 located in Baltimore, Maryland, as "Cal Ripken Way".
Pub. L. 110–89 (text) (PDF)	September 28, 2007	(No short title)	To extend the trade adjustment assistance program under the Trade Act of 1974 for 3 months.
Pub. L. 110–90 (text) (PDF)	September 29, 2007	TMA, Abstinence Education, and QI Programs Extension Act of 2007	To provide for the extension of transitional medical assistance (TMA), the abstinence education program, and the qualifying individuals (QI) program, and for other purposes.
Pub. L. 110–91 (text) (PDF)	September 29, 2007	(No short title)	Increasing the statutory limit on the public debt.
Pub. L. 110–92 (text) (PDF)	September 29, 2007	(No short title)	Making continuing appropriations for the fiscal year 2008, and for other purposes.
Pub. L. 110–93 (text) (PDF)	September 30, 2007	(No short title)	To make permanent the waiver authority of the Secretary of Education with respect to student financial assistance during a war or other military operation or national emergency.
Pub. L. 110–94 (text) (PDF)	October 9, 2007	Pesticide Registration Improvement Renewal Act	To amend the Federal Insecticide, Fungicide, and Rodenticide Act to renew and amend the provisions for the enhanced review of covered pesticide products, to authorize fees for certain pesticide products, to extend and improve the collection of maintenance fees, and for other purposes.
Pub. L. 110–95 (text) (PDF)	October 16, 2007	(No short title)	To award a Congressional Gold Medal to Michael Ellis DeBakey, M.D.
Pub. L. 110–96 (text) (PDF)	October 16, 2007	International Emergency Economic Powers Enhancement Act	To amend the penalty provisions in the International Emergency Economic Powers Act, and for other purposes.
Pub. L. 110–97 (text) (PDF)	October 24, 2007	(No short title)	To extend the District of Columbia College Access Act of 1999.
Pub. L. 110–98 (text) (PDF)	October 24, 2007	(No short title)	To designate the facility of the United States Postal Service located at 69 Montgomery Street in Jersey City, New Jersey, as the "Frank J. Guarini Post Office Building".
Pub. L. 110–99 (text) (PDF)	October 24, 2007	(No short title)	To designate the facility of the United States Postal Service located at 555 South 3rd Street Lobby in Memphis, Tennessee, as the "Kenneth T. Whalum, Sr. Post Office Building".
Pub. L. 110–100 (text) (PDF)	October 24, 2007	(No short title)	To designate the facility of the United States Postal Service located at 202 South Dumont Avenue in Woonsocket, South Dakota, as the "Eleanor McGovern Post Office Building".
Pub. L. 110–101 (text) (PDF)	October 24, 2007	(No short title)	To designate the facility of the United States Postal Service located at 44 North Main Street in Hughesville, Pennsylvania, as the "Master Sergeant Sean Michael Thomas Post Office".
Pub. L. 110–102 (text) (PDF)	October 24, 2007	(No short title)	To designate the facility of the United States Postal Service located at 3 Quaker Ridge Road in New Rochelle, New York, as the "Robert Merrill Postal Station".
Pub. L. 110–103 (text) (PDF)	October 24, 2007	(No short title)	To designate the facility of the United States Postal Service located at 326 South Main Street in Princeton, Illinois, as the "Owen Lovejoy Princeton Post Office Building".
Pub. L. 110–104 (text) (PDF)	October 24, 2007	(No short title)	To designate the facility of the United States Postal Service located at 954 Wheeling Avenue in Cambridge, Ohio, as the "John Herschel Glenn, Jr. Post Office Building".
Pub. L. 110–105 (text) (PDF)	October 24, 2007	(No short title)	To designate the facility of the United States Postal Service located at 805 Main Street in Ferdinand, Indiana as the "Staff Sergeant David L. Nord Post Office".
Pub. L. 110–106 (text) (PDF)	October 25, 2007	(No short title)	To amend Public Law 106-348 to extend the authorization for establishing a memorial in the District of Columbia or its environs to honor veterans who became disabled while serving in the Armed Forces of the United States.
Pub. L. 110–107 (text) (PDF)	October 26, 2007	(No short title)	To designate the facility of the United States Postal Service located at Highway 49 South in Piney Woods, Mississippi, as the "Laurence C. and Grace M. Jones Post Office Building".
Pub. L. 110–108 (text) (PDF)	October 31, 2007	Internet Tax Freedom Act Amendments Act of 2007	To amend the Internet Tax Freedom Act to extend the moratorium on certain taxes relating to the Internet and to electronic commerce.
Pub. L. 110–109 (text) (PDF)	October 31, 2007	Third Higher Education Extension Act of 2007	To temporarily extend the programs under the Higher Education Act of 1965, to amend the definition of an eligible not-for-profit holder, and for other purposes.
Pub. L. 110–110 (text) (PDF)	November 5, 2007	Joshua Omvig Veterans Suicide Prevention Act	To amend title 38, United States Code, to direct the Secretary of Veterans Affairs to develop and implement a comprehensive program designed to reduce the incidence of suicide among veterans.
Pub. L. 110–111 (text) (PDF)	November 5, 2007	Veterans' Compensation Cost-of-Living Adjustment Act of 2007	To increase, effective as of December 1, 2007, the rates of compensation for veterans with service-connected disabilities and the rates of dependency and indemnity compensation for the survivors of certain disabled veterans.
Pub. L. 110–112 (text) (PDF)	November 8, 2007	(No short title)	To designate the Department of Veterans Affairs Medical Center in Augusta, Georgia, as the "Charlie Norwood Department of Veterans Affairs Medical Center".
Pub. L. 110–113 (text) (PDF)	November 8, 2007	Procedural Fairness for September 11 Victims Act of 2007	To provide nationwide subpoena authority for actions brought under the September 11 Victim Compensation Fund of 2001.
Pub. L. 110–114 (text) (PDF)	November 9, 2007	Water Resources Development Act of 2007	To provide for the conservation and development of water and related resources, to authorize the Secretary of the Army to construct various projects for improvements to rivers and harbors of the United States, and for other purposes.
Pub. L. 110–115 (text) (PDF)	November 13, 2007	(No short title)	To recognize the Navy UDT-SEAL Museum in Fort Pierce, Florida, as the official national museum of Navy SEALS and their predecessors.
Pub. L. 110–116 (text) (PDF)	November 13, 2007	(No short title)	Making appropriations for the Department of Defense for the fiscal year ending September 30, 3008.
Pub. L. 110–117 (text) (PDF)	November 15, 2007	(No short title)	To designate the Department of Veterans Affairs Medical Center in Asheville, North Carolina as the "Charles George Veterans Affairs Medical Center".
Pub. L. 110–118 (text) (PDF)	November 16, 2007	(No short title)	To name the Department of Veterans Affairs medical facility in Iron Mountain, Michigan, as the "Oscar G. Johnson Department of Veterans Affairs Medical Facility".
Pub. L. 110–119 (text) (PDF)	November 16, 2007	(No short title)	Providing for the reappointment of Roger W. Sant as a citizen regent of the Smithsonian Institution.
Pub. L. 110–120 (text) (PDF)	November 19, 2007	(No short title)	To provide technical corrections to Public Law 109-116 (2 U.S.C. § 2131a note) to extend the time period for the Joint Committee on the Library to enter into an agreement to obtain a statue of Rosa Parks, and for other purposes.
Pub. L. 110–121 (text) (PDF)	November 30, 2007	(No short title)	To designate the facility of the United States Postal Service located at 701 Loyola Avenue in New Orleans, Louisiana, as the "Louisiana Armed Services Veterans Post Office".
Pub. L. 110–122 (text) (PDF)	November 30, 2007	(No short title)	To designate the facility of the United States Postal Service located at 203 North Main Street in Vassar, Michigan, as the "Corporal Christopher E. Esckelson Post Office Building"
Pub. L. 110–123 (text) (PDF)	November 30, 2007	(No short title)	To designate the facility of the United States Postal Service located at 950 West Trenton Avenue in Morrisville, Pennsylvania, as the "Nate DeTample Post Office Building".
Pub. L. 110–124 (text) (PDF)	November 30, 2007	(No short title)	To designate the facility of the United States Postal Service located at 570 Broadway in Bayonne, New Jersey, as the "Dennis P. Collins Post Office Building".
Pub. L. 110–125 (text) (PDF)	November 30, 2007	(No short title)	To designate the facility of the United States Postal Service located at 216 East Main Street in Atwood, Indiana, as the "Lance Corporal David K. Fribley Post Office".
Pub. L. 110–126 (text) (PDF)	November 30, 2007	(No short title)	To designate the facility of the United States Postal Service located at 235 Mountain Road in Suffield, Connecticut, as the "Corporal Stephen R. Bixler Post Office".
Pub. L. 110–127 (text) (PDF)	November 30, 2007	(No short title)	To designate the facility of the United States Postal Service located at 200 North William Street in Goldsboro, North Carolina, as the "Philip A. Baddour, Sr. Post Office".
Pub. L. 110–128 (text) (PDF)	November 30, 2007	(No short title)	To designate the facility of the United States Postal Service located at 202 East Michigan Avenue in Marshall, Michigan, as the "Michael W. Schragg Post Office Building".
Pub. L. 110–129 (text) (PDF)	November 30, 2007	(No short title)	To designate the facility of the United States Postal Service located at 1430 South Highway 29 in Cantonment, Florida, as the "Charles H. Hendrix Post Office Building".
Pub. L. 110–130 (text) (PDF)	November 30, 2007	(No short title)	To designate the facility of the United States Postal Service located at 1400 Highway 41 North in Inverness, Florida as the "Chief Warrant Officer Aaron Weaver Post Office Building".
Pub. L. 110–131 (text) (PDF)	November 30, 2007	(No short title)	To designate the facility of the United States Postal Service located at 4320 Blue Parkway in Kansas City, Missouri, as the "Wallace S. Hartsfield Post Office Building".
Pub. L. 110–132 (text) (PDF)	December 6, 2007	Multinational Species Conservation Funds Reauthorization Act of 2007	To reauthorize the African Elephant Conservation Act and the Rhinoceros and Tiger Conservation Act of 1994.
Pub. L. 110–133 (text) (PDF)	December 6, 2007	Asian Elephant Conservation Reauthorization Act of 2007	To reauthorize the Asian Elephant Conservation Act of 1997
Pub. L. 110–134 (text) (PDF)	December 12, 2007	Improving Head Start for School Readiness Act of 2007	To reauthorize the Head Start Act, to improve program quality, to expand access, and for other purposes.
Pub. L. 110–135 (text) (PDF)	December 13, 2007	Fair Treatment for Experienced Pilots Act	To amend title 49, United States Code, to modify age standards for pilots engaged in commercial aviation operations.
Pub. L. 110–136 (text) (PDF)	December 14, 2007	(No short title)	To provide for an additional temporary extension of programs under the Small Business Act and the Small Business Investment Act of 1958 through May 23, 2008, and for other purposes.
Pub. L. 110–137 (text) (PDF)	December 14, 2007	(No short title)	Making further continuing appropriations for the fiscal year 2008, and for other purposes.
Pub. L. 110–138 (text) (PDF)	December 14, 2007	United States-Peru Trade Promotion Agreement Implementation Act	To implement the United States-Peru Trade Promotion Agreement.
Pub. L. 110–139 (text) (PDF)	December 18, 2007	(No short title)	To provide that the great hall of the Capitol Visitor Center shall be known as Emancipation Hall.
Pub. L. 110–140 (text) (PDF)	December 19, 2007	Energy Independence and Security Act of 2007	To move the United States toward greater energy independence and security, to increase the production of clean renewable fuels, to protect consumers, to increase the efficiency of products, buildings, and vehicles, to promote research on and deploy greenhouse gas capture and storage options, and to improve the energy performance of the Federal Government, and for other purposes
Pub. L. 110–141 (text) (PDF)	December 19, 2007	(No short title)	To exclude from gross income payments from the Hokie Spirit Memorial Fund to the victims of the tragic event at Virginia Polytechnic Institute & State University.
Pub. L. 110–142 (text) (PDF)	December 20, 2007	Mortgage Forgiveness Debt Relief Act of 2007	To amend the Internal Revenue Code of 1986 to exclude discharges of indebtedness on principal residences from gross income, and for other purposes.
Pub. L. 110–143 (text) (PDF)	December 21, 2007	Methamphetamine Remediation Research Act of 2007	To provide for a research program for remediation of closed methamphetamine production laboratories, and for other purposes.
Pub. L. 110–144 (text) (PDF)	December 21, 2007	Charlie W. Norwood Living Organ Donation Act	To amend the National Organ Transplant Act to provide that criminal penalties do not apply to human organ paired donation, and for other purposes.
Pub. L. 110–145 (text) (PDF)	December 21, 2007	(No short title)	To designate the Department of Veterans Affairs outpatient clinic in Green Bay, Wisconsin, as the "Milo C. Huempfner Department of Veterans Affairs Outpatient Clinic".
Pub. L. 110–146 (text) (PDF)	December 21, 2007	(No short title)	To designate the United States courthouse located at 301 North Miami Avenue, Miami, Florida, as the "C. Clyde Atkins United States Courthouse".
Pub. L. 110–147 (text) (PDF)	December 21, 2007	(No short title)	To amend section 5112(p)(1)(A) of title 31, United States Code, to allow an exception from the $1 coin dispensing capability requirement for certain vending machines.
Pub. L. 110–148 (text) (PDF)	December 21, 2007	(No short title)	To amend the Arizona Water Settlements Act to modify the requirements for the statement of findings.
Pub. L. 110–149 (text) (PDF)	December 21, 2007	(No short title)	Making further continuing appropriations for the fiscal year 2008, and for other purposes.
Pub. L. 110–150 (text) (PDF)	December 21, 2007	(No short title)	To amend title 39, United States Code, to extend the authority of the United States Postal Service to issue a semipostal to raise funds for breast cancer research.
Pub. L. 110–151 (text) (PDF)	December 21, 2007	Genocide Accountability Act of 2007	To amend section 1091 of title 18, United States Code, to allow the prosecution of genocide in appropriate circumstances.
Pub. L. 110–152 (text) (PDF)	December 21, 2007	(No short title)	To designate the facility of the United States Postal Service located at 175 South Monroe Street in Tiffin, Ohio, as the "Paul E. Gillmor Post Office Building".
Pub. L. 110–153 (text) (PDF)	December 21, 2007	(No short title)	To amend the Higher Education Act of 1965 to make technical corrections.
Pub. L. 110–154 (text) (PDF)	December 21, 2007	(No short title)	To rename the National Institute of Child Health and Human Development as the Eunice Kennedy Shriver National Institute of Child Health and Human Development.
Pub. L. 110–155 (text) (PDF)	December 21, 2007	(No short title)	Providing for the reappointment of Patricia Q. Stonesifer as a citizen regent of the Smithsonian Institution.
Pub. L. 110–156 (text) (PDF)	December 26, 2007	(No short title)	To designate the Department of Veterans Affairs Outpatient Clinic in Tulsa, Oklahoma, as the "Ernest Childers Department of Veterans Affairs Outpatient Clinic".
Pub. L. 110–157 (text) (PDF)	December 26, 2007	Dr. James Allen Veteran Vision Equity Act of 2007	To amend title 38, United States Code, to improve low-vision benefits matters, matters relating to burial and memorial affairs, and other matters under the laws administered by the Secretary of Veterans Affairs, and for other purposes.
Pub. L. 110–158 (text) (PDF)	December 26, 2007	(No short title)	To designate the Federal building located at 210 Walnut Street in Des Moines, Iowa, as the "Neal Smith Federal Building".
Pub. L. 110–159 (text) (PDF)	December 26, 2007	(No short title)	To designate the Federal building and United States courthouse located at 100 East 8th Avenue in Pine Bluff, Arkansas, as the "George Howard Jr. Federal Building and United States Courthouse"..
Pub. L. 110–160 (text) (PDF)	December 26, 2007	Terrorism Risk Insurance Program Reauthorization Act of 2007	To extend the Terrorism Insurance Program of the Department of the Treasury, and for other purposes.
Pub. L. 110–161 (text) (PDF)	December 26, 2007	Consolidated Appropriations Act, 2008	Making appropriations for the Department of State, foreign operations, and related programs for the fiscal year ending September 30, 2008, and for other purposes.
Pub. L. 110–162 (text) (PDF)	December 26, 2007	(No short title)	To designate the facility of the United States Postal Service located at 744 West Oglethorpe Highway in Hinesville, Georgia, as the "John Sidney 'Sid' Flowers Post Office Building".
Pub. L. 110–163 (text) (PDF)	December 26, 2007	(No short title)	To designate the facility of the United States Postal Service located at 16731 Santa Ana Avenue in Fontana, California, as the "Beatrice E. Watson Post Office Building".
Pub. L. 110–164 (text) (PDF)	December 26, 2007	(No short title)	To amend the Congressional Accountability Act of 1995 to permit individuals who have served as employees of the Office of Compliance to serve as executive director, deputy executive director, or general counsel of the office, and to permit individuals appointed to such positions to serve one additional term.
Pub. L. 110–165 (text) (PDF)	December 26, 2007	(No short title)	To designate the facility of the United States Postal Service located at 797 Sam Bass Road in Round Rock, Texas, as the "Marine Corps Corporal Steven P. Gill Post Office Building".
Pub. L. 110–166 (text) (PDF)	December 26, 2007	Tax Increase Prevention Act of 2007	To amend the Internal Revenue Code of 1986 to extend certain expiring provisions, and for other purposes.
Pub. L. 110–167 (text) (PDF)	December 26, 2007	(No short title)	To designate the facility of the United States Postal Service located at 567 West Nepessing Street in Lapeer, Michigan, as the "Turrill Post Office Building".
Pub. L. 110–168 (text) (PDF)	December 26, 2007	(No short title)	To authorize a major medical facility project to modernize inpatient wards at the Department of Veterans Affairs Medical Center in Atlanta, Georgia.
Pub. L. 110–169 (text) (PDF)	December 26, 2007	(No short title)	To designate the facility of the United States Postal Service located at 11 Central Street in Hillsborough, New Hampshire, as the "Officer Jeremy Todd Charron Post Office".
Pub. L. 110–170 (text) (PDF)	December 26, 2007	Chimp Haven is Home Act	To amend the Public Health Service Act to modify the program for the sanctuary system for surplus chimpanzees by terminating the authority for the removal of chimpanzees from the system for research purposes.
Pub. L. 110–171 (text) (PDF)	December 26, 2007	(No short title)	Joint resolution granting the consent of Congress to the International Emergency Management Assistance Memorandum of Understanding
Pub. L. 110–172 (text) (PDF)	December 29, 2007	Tax Technical Corrections Act of 2007	To amend the Internal Revenue Code of 1986 to make technical corrections, and for other purposes.
Pub. L. 110–173 (text) (PDF)	December 29, 2007	Medicare, Medicaid, and SCHIP Extension Act of 2007	To amend titles XVIII, XIX, and XXI of the Social Security Act to extend provisions under the Medicare, Medicaid, and SCHIP programs, and for other purposes.
Pub. L. 110–174 (text) (PDF)	December 31, 2007	Sudan Accountability and Divestment Act of 2007	To authorize State and local governments to divest assets in companies that conduct business operations in Sudan, to prohibit United States Government contracts with such companies, and for other purposes.
Pub. L. 110–175 (text) (PDF)	December 31, 2007	Openness Promotes Effectiveness in our National Government Act of 2007 or the OPEN Government Act of 2007	To promote accessibility, accountability, and openness in Government by strengthening section 552 of title 5, United States Code (commonly referred to as the Freedom of Information Act), and for other purposes.
Pub. L. 110–176 (text) (PDF)	January 4, 2008	(No short title)	To amend the Internal Revenue Code of 1986 to clarify the term of the Commissioner of Internal Revenue.
Pub. L. 110–177 (text) (PDF)	January 7, 2008	Court Security Improvement Act of 2007	To amend title 18, United States Code, to protect judges, prosecutors, witnesses, victims, and their family members, and for other purposes.
Pub. L. 110–178 (text) (PDF)	January 7, 2008	U.S. Capitol Police and Library of Congress Police Merger Implementation Act of 2007	To provide for the transfer of the Library of Congress police to the United States Capitol Police, and for other purposes.
Pub. L. 110–179 (text) (PDF)	January 7, 2008	Emergency and Disaster Assistance Fraud Penalty Enhancement Act of 2007	To amend title 18, United States Code, with respect to fraud in connection with major disaster or emergency funds.
Pub. L. 110–180 (text) (PDF)	January 8, 2008	NISC Improvement Act of 2007	To improve the National Instant Criminal Background Check System, and for other purposes.
Pub. L. 110–181 (text) (PDF)	January 28, 2008	National Defense Authorization Act for Fiscal Year 2008	To provide for the enactment of the National Defense Authorization Act for Fiscal Year 2008, as previously enrolled, with certain modifications to address the foreign sovereign immunities provisions of title 28, United States Code, with respect to the attachment of property in certain judgments against Iraq, the lapse of statutory authorities for the payment of bonuses, special pays, and similar benefits for members of the uniformed services, and for other purposes.
Pub. L. 110–182 (text) (PDF)	January 31, 2008	(No short title)	To extend the Protect America Act of 2007 for 15 days.
Pub. L. 110–183 (text) (PDF)	February 5, 2008	Commission on the Abolition of the Transatlantic Slave Trade Act	To establish the Commission on the Abolition of the Transatlantic Slave Trade.
Pub. L. 110–184 (text) (PDF)	February 6, 2008	(No short title)	To designate the facility of the United States Postal Service located at 427 North Street in Taft, California, as the "Larry S. Pierce Post Office".
Pub. L. 110–185 (text) (PDF)	February 13, 2008	Economic Stimulus Act of 2008	To provide economic stimulus through recovery rebates to individuals, incentives for business investment, and an increase in conforming and FHA loan limits.
Pub. L. 110–186 (text) (PDF)	February 14, 2008	Military Reservist and Veteran Small Business Reauthorization and Opportunity Act of 2008	To improve and expand small business assistance programs for veterans of the armed forces and military reservists, and for other purposes.
Pub. L. 110–187 (text) (PDF)	February 15, 2008	Do-Not-Call Improvement Act of 2007	To amend the Do-not-call Implementation Act to eliminate the automatic removal of telephone numbers registered on the Federal "do-not-call" registry.
Pub. L. 110–188 (text) (PDF)	February 15, 2008	Do-Not-Call Registry Fee Extension Act of 2007	To extend the authority of the Federal Trade Commission to collect Do-Not-Call Registry fees to fiscal years after fiscal year 2007.
Pub. L. 110–189 (text) (PDF)	February 28, 2008	Cameron Gulbransen Kids Transportation Safety Act of 2007 (or K.T. Safety Act of 2007)	To direct the Secretary of Transportation to issue regulations to reduce the incidence of child injury and death occurring inside or outside of light motor vehicles, and for other purposes.
Pub. L. 110–190 (text) (PDF)	February 28, 2008	Airport and Airway Extension Act of 2008	To amend the Internal Revenue Code of 1986 to extend the funding and expenditure authority of the Airport and Airway Trust Fund, and for other purposes.
Pub. L. 110–191 (text) (PDF)	February 29, 2008	Andean Trade Preference Extension Act of 2008	To extend the Andean Trade Preference Act, and for other purposes.
Pub. L. 110–192 (text) (PDF)	February 29, 2008	(No short title)	To provide for the continued minting and issuance of certain $1 coins in 2008.
Pub. L. 110–193 (text) (PDF)	March 6, 2008	(No short title)	To make technical corrections to the Federal Insecticide, Fungicide, and Rodenticide Act.
Pub. L. 110–194 (text) (PDF)	March 11, 2008	(No short title)	To designate the facility of the United States Postal Service located at 59 Colby Corner in East Hampstead, New Hampshire, as the "Captain Jonathan D. Grassbaugh Post Office"
Pub. L. 110–195 (text) (PDF)	March 12, 2008	(No short title)	To designate the facility of the United States Postal Service known as the Southpark Station in Alexandria, Louisiana, as the John "Marty" Thiels Southpark Station, in honor and memory of Thiels, a Louisiana postal worker who was killed in the line of duty on October 4, 2007.
Pub. L. 110–196 (text) (PDF)	March 14, 2008	(No short title)	To extend agricultural programs beyond March 15, 2008, to suspend permanent price support authorities beyond that date, and for other purposes.
Pub. L. 110–197 (text) (PDF)	March 14, 2008	(No short title)	Providing for the appointment of John W. McCarter as a citizen regent of the Board of Regents of the Smithsonian Institution.
Pub. L. 110–198 (text) (PDF)	March 24, 2008	Higher Education Extension Act of 2008	To temporarily extend the programs under the Higher Education Act of 1965.
Pub. L. 110–199 (text) (PDF)	April 9, 2008	Second Chance Act of 2007: Community Safety Through Recidivism Prevention (or the Second Chance Act of 2007)	To reauthorize the grant program for reentry of offenders into the community in the Omnibus Crime Control and Safe Streets Act of 1968, to improve reentry planning and implementation, and for other purposes.
Pub. L. 110–200 (text) (PDF)	April 18, 2008	(No short title)	To amend Public Law 110-196 to provide for a temporary extension of programs authorized by the Farm Security and Rural Investment Act of 2002 beyond April 18, 2008.
Pub. L. 110–201 (text) (PDF)	April 18, 2008	(No short title)	To preserve existing judgeships on the Superior Court of the District of Columbia.
Pub. L. 110–202 (text) (PDF)	April 23, 2008	Safety of Seniors Act of 2007	To direct the Secretary of Health and Human Services to expand and intensify programs with respect to research and related activities concerning elder falls.
Pub. L. 110–203 (text) (PDF)	April 23, 2008	(No short title)	Congratulating the Army Reserve on its centennial, which will be formally celebrated on April 23, 2008, and commemorating the historic contributions of its veterans and continuing contributions of its soldiers to the vital national security interests and homeland defense missions of the United States
Pub. L. 110–204 (text) (PDF)	April 24, 2008	Newborn Screening Saves Lives Act of 2007	To amend the Public Health Service Act to establish grant programs to provide for education and outreach on newborn screening and coordinated followup care once newborn screening has been conducted, to reauthorize programs under part A of title XI of such Act, and for other purposes.
Pub. L. 110–205 (text) (PDF)	April 25, 2008	(No short title)	To amend Public Law 110-196 to provide for a temporary extension of programs authorized by the Farm Security and Rural Investment Act of 2002 beyond April 25, 2008.
Pub. L. 110–206 (text) (PDF)	April 28, 2008	Traumatic Brain Injury Act of 2008	To provide for the expansion and improvement of traumatic brain injury programs.
Pub. L. 110–207 (text) (PDF)	April 30, 2008	Purple Heart Family Equity Act of 2007	To amend title 36, United States Code, to revise the congressional charter of the Military Order of the Purple Heart of the United States of America, Incorporated, to authorize associate membership in the corporation for the spouse and siblings of a recipient of the Purple Heart medal.
Pub. L. 110–208 (text) (PDF)	May 2, 2008	(No short title)	To amend Public Law 110-196 to provide for a temporary extension of programs authorized by the Farm Security and Rural Investment Act of 2002 beyond May 2, 2008.
Pub. L. 110–209 (text) (PDF)	May 6, 2008	(No short title)	To award a Congressional Gold Medal to Daw Aung San Suu Kyi in recognition of her courageous and unwavering commitment to peace, nonviolence, human rights, and democracy in Burma.
Pub. L. 110–210 (text) (PDF)	May 7, 2008	(No short title)	To designate the facility of the United States Postal Service located at 20 Sussex Street in Port Jervis, New York, as the "E. Arthur Gray Post Office Building".
Pub. L. 110–211 (text) (PDF)	May 7, 2008	(No short title)	To designate the facility of the United States Postal Service located at 1704 Weeksville Road in Elizabeth City, North Carolina, as the "Dr. Clifford Bell Jones, Sr. Post Office".
Pub. L. 110–212 (text) (PDF)	May 7, 2008	(No short title)	To designate the facility of the United States Postal Service located at 5815 McLeod Street in Lula, Georgia, as the "Private Johnathon Millican Lula Post Office".
Pub. L. 110–213 (text) (PDF)	May 7, 2008	(No short title)	To designate the facility of the United States Postal Service located at 424 Clay Avenue in Waco, Texas, as the "Army PFC Juan Alonso Covarrubias Post Office Building".
Pub. L. 110–214 (text) (PDF)	May 7, 2008	(No short title)	To designate the facility of the United States Postal Service located at 3100 Cashwell Drive in Goldsboro, North Carolina, as the "John Henry Wooten, Sr. Post Office Building".
Pub. L. 110–215 (text) (PDF)	May 7, 2008	(No short title)	To designate the facility of the United States Postal Service located at 116 Helen Highway in Cleveland, Georgia, as the "Sgt. Jason Harkins Post Office Building".
Pub. L. 110–216 (text) (PDF)	May 7, 2008	(No short title)	To designate the facility of the United States Postal Service located at 3701 Altamesa Boulevard in Fort Worth, Texas, as the "Master Sergeant Kenneth N. Mack Post Office Building".
Pub. L. 110–217 (text) (PDF)	May 7, 2008	(No short title)	To designate the facility of the United States Postal Service located at 701 East Copeland Drive in Lebanon, Missouri, as the "Steve W. Allee Carrier Annex".
Pub. L. 110–218 (text) (PDF)	May 7, 2008	(No short title)	To designate the facility of the United States Postal Service located at 3035 Stone Mountain Street in Lithonia, Georgia, as the "Specialist Jamaal RaShard Addison Post Office Building".
Pub. L. 110–219 (text) (PDF)	May 7, 2008	(No short title)	To designate the facility of the United States Postal Service located at 725 Roanoke Avenue in Roanoke Rapids, North Carolina, as the "Judge Richard B. Allsbrook Post Office".
Pub. L. 110–220 (text) (PDF)	May 7, 2008	(No short title)	To designate the facility of the United States Postal Service located at 10799 West Alameda Avenue in Lakewood, Colorado, as the "Felix Sparks Post Office Building".
Pub. L. 110–221 (text) (PDF)	May 7, 2008	(No short title)	To designate the facility of the United States Postal Service located at 3050 Hunsinger Lane in Louisville, Kentucky, as the "Iraq and Afghanistan Fallen Military Heroes of Louisville Memorial Post Office Building", in honor of the servicemen and women from Louisville, Kentucky, who died in service during Operation Enduring Freedom and Operation Iraqi Freedom.
Pub. L. 110–222 (text) (PDF)	May 7, 2008	(No short title)	To designate the facility of the United States Postal Service located at 201 West Greenway Street in Derby, Kansas, as the "Sergeant Jamie O. Maugans Post Office Building".
Pub. L. 110–223 (text) (PDF)	May 7, 2008	(No short title)	To designate the facility of the United States Postal Service located at 3800 SW. 185th Avenue in Beaverton, Oregon, as the "Major Arthur Chin Post Office Building"/
Pub. L. 110–224 (text) (PDF)	May 7, 2008	(No short title)	To designate the facility of the United States Postal Service located at 160 East Washington Street in Chagrin Falls, Ohio, as the "Sgt. Michael M. Kashkoush Post Office Building".
Pub. L. 110–225 (text) (PDF)	May 7, 2008	(No short title)	To designate the facility of the United States Postal Service located at 2650 Dr. Martin Luther King Jr. Street, Indianapolis, Indiana, as the "Julia M. Carson Post Office Building".
Pub. L. 110–226 (text) (PDF)	May 7, 2008	(No short title)	To designate the facility of the United States Postal Service located at 6892 Main Street in Gloucester, Virginia, as the "Congresswoman Jo Ann S. Davis Post Office".
Pub. L. 110–227 (text) (PDF)	May 7, 2008	Ensuring Continued Access to Student Loans Act of 2008	To ensure continued availability of access to the Federal student loan program for students and families.
Pub. L. 110–228 (text) (PDF)	May 8, 2008	(No short title)	To provide for extensions of leases of certain land by Mashantucket Pequot (Western) Tribe.
Pub. L. 110–229 (text) (PDF)	May 8, 2008	Consolidated Natural Resources Act of 2008	To authorize certain programs and activities in the Department of the Interior, the Forest Service, and the Department of Energy, to implement further the Act approving the Covenant to Establish a Commonwealth of the Northern Mariana Islands in Political Union with the United States of America, to amend the Compact of Free Association Amendments Act of 2003, and for other purposes.
Pub. L. 110–230 (text) (PDF)	May 13, 2008	(No short title)	To temporarily extend the programs under the Higher Education Act of 1965.
Pub. L. 110–231 (text) (PDF)	May 18, 2008	(No short title)	To amend Public Law 110-196 to provide for a temporary extension of programs authorized by the Farm Security and Rural Investment Act of 2002 beyond May 16, 2008.
Pub. L. 110–232 (text) (PDF)	May 19, 2008	Strategic Petroleum Reserve Fill Suspension and Consumer Protection Act of 2008	To suspend the acquisition of petroleum for the Strategic Petroleum Reserve, and for other purposes.
Pub. L. 110–233 (text) (PDF)	May 21, 2008	Genetic Information Nondiscrimination Act of 2008	To prohibit discrimination on the basis of genetic information with respect to health insurance and employment.
Pub. L. 110–234 (text) (PDF)	May 22, 2008	Food, Conservation, and Energy Act of 2008 (2008 Farm Bill) (NOTE: VETO-OVERRIDDEN)	To provide for the continuation of agricultural programs through fiscal year 2012, and for other purposes.
Pub. L. 110–235 (text) (PDF)	May 23, 2008	(No short title)	To provide for an additional temporary extension of programs under the Small Business Act and the Small Business Investment Act of 1958, and for other purposes.
Pub. L. 110–236 (text) (PDF)	May 27, 2008	(No short title)	To ratify a conveyance of a portion of the Jicarilla Apache Reservation to Rio Arriba County, State of New Mexico, pursuant to the settlement of litigation between the Jicarilla Apache Nation and Rio Arriba County, State of New Mexico, to authorize issuance of a patent for said lands, and to change the exterior boundary of the Jicarilla Apache Reservation accordingly, and for other purposes.
Pub. L. 110–237 (text) (PDF)	May 27, 2008	(No short title)	To make technical corrections regarding the Newborn Screening Saves Lives Act of 2007.
Pub. L. 110–238 (text) (PDF)	May 30, 2008	(No short title)	To temporarily extend the programs under the Higher Education Act of 1965.
Pub. L. 110–239 (text) (PDF)	June 3, 2008	(No short title)	To amend title 4, United States Code, to encourage the display of the flag of the United States on Father's Day.
Pub. L. 110–240 (text) (PDF)	June 3, 2008	Protecting Our Children Comes First Act of 2007	To amend the Missing Children's Assistance Act to authorize appropriations; and for other purposes.
Pub. L. 110–241 (text) (PDF)	June 3, 2008	Credit and Debit Card Receipt Clarification Act of 2007	To amend the Fair Credit Reporting Act to make technical corrections to the definition of willful noncompliance with respect to violations involving the printing of an expiration date on certain credit and debit card receipts before the date of the enactment of this Act.
Pub. L. 110–242 (text) (PDF)	June 3, 2008	(No short title)	To make technical corrections to section 1244 of the National Defense Authorization Act for Fiscal Year 2008, which provides special immigrant status for certain Iraqis, and for other purposes.
Pub. L. 110–243 (text) (PDF)	June 3, 2008	(No short title)	Directing the United States to initiate international discussions and take necessary steps with other Nations to negotiate an agreement for managing migratory and transboundary fish stocks in the Arctic Ocean.
Pub. L. 110–244 (text) (PDF)	June 6, 2008	SAFETEA-LU Technical Corrections Act of 2008	To amend the Safe, Accountable, Flexible, Efficient Transportation Equity Act: A Legacy for Users to make technical corrections, and for other purposes.
Pub. L. 110–245 (text) (PDF)	June 17, 2008	Heroes Earnings Assistance and Relief Tax Act of 2008	To amend the Internal Revenue Code of 1986 to provide benefits for military personnel, and for other purposes.
Pub. L. 110–246 (text) (PDF)	June 18, 2008	Food, Conservation, and Energy Act of 2008 (NOTE: VETO-OVERRIDDEN)	To provide for the continuation of agricultural and other programs of the Department of Agriculture through fiscal year 2012, and for other purposes.
Pub. L. 110–247 (text) (PDF)	June 20, 2008	Federal Food Donation Act of 2008	To encourage the donation of excess food to nonprofit organizations that provide assistance to food-insecure people in the United States in contracts entered into by executive agencies for the provision, service, or sale of food.
Pub. L. 110–248 (text) (PDF)	June 26, 2008	Local Preparedness Acquisition Act	To amend title 40, United States Code, to authorize the use of Federal supply schedules for the acquisition of law enforcement, security, and certain other related items by State and local governments.
Pub. L. 110–249 (text) (PDF)	June 26, 2008	(No short title)	To amend the International Center Act to authorize the lease or sublease of certain property described in such Act to an entity other than a foreign government or international organization if certain conditions are met.
Pub. L. 110–250 (text) (PDF)	June 26, 2008	(No short title)	To reform mutual aid agreements for the National Capital Region.
Pub. L. 110–251 (text) (PDF)	June 26, 2008	Kendell Frederick Citizenship Assistance Act	To assist members of the Armed Forces in obtaining United States citizenship, and for other purposes.
Pub. L. 110–252 (text) (PDF)	June 30, 2008	Supplemental Appropriations Act of 2008	Making appropriations for military construction, the Department of Veterans Affairs, and related agencies for the fiscal year ending September 30, 2008, and for other purposes.
Pub. L. 110–253 (text) (PDF)	June 30, 2008	Federal Aviation Administration Extension Act of 2008	To amend the Internal Revenue Code of 1986 to extend the funding and expenditure authority of the Airport and Airway Trust Fund, and for other purposes.
Pub. L. 110–254 (text) (PDF)	June 30, 2008	(No short title)	To grant a Federal charter to Korean War Veterans Association, Incorporated
Pub. L. 110–255 (text) (PDF)	June 30, 2008	(No short title)	To authorize the Administrator of the Environmental Protection Agency to accept, as part of a settlement, diesel emission reduction Supplemental Environmental Projects, and for other purposes.
Pub. L. 110–256 (text) (PDF)	June 30, 2008	(No short title)	To temporarily extend the programs under the Higher Education Act of 1965.
Pub. L. 110–257 (text) (PDF)	July 1, 2008	(No short title)	To remove the African National Congress from treatment as a terrorist organization for certain acts or events, provide relief for certain members of the African National Congress regarding admissibility, and for other purposes.
Pub. L. 110–258 (text) (PDF)	July 1, 2008	(No short title)	To revise the short title of the Fannie Lou Hamer, Rosa Parks, and Coretta Scott King Voting Rights Act Reauthorization and Amendments Act of 2006.
Pub. L. 110–259 (text) (PDF)	July 1, 2008	(No short title)	To award posthumously a Congressional Gold Medal to Constantino Brumidi.
Pub. L. 110–260 (text) (PDF)	July 1, 2008	Edward William Brooke III Congressional Gold Medal Act	To award a congressional gold medal to Edward William Brooke III in recognition of his unprecedented and enduring service to our Nation.
Pub. L. 110–261 (text) (PDF)	July 10, 2008	Foreign Intelligence Surveillance Act of 1978 Amendments Act of 2008 (or the FISA Amendments Act of 2008)	To amend the Foreign Intelligence Surveillance Act of 1978 to establish a procedure for authorizing certain acquisitions of foreign intelligence, and for other purposes.
Pub. L. 110–262 (text) (PDF)	July 15, 2008	(No short title)	To designate the United States bankruptcy courthouse located at 271 Cadman Plaza East in Brooklyn, New York, as the "Conrad B. Duberstein United States Bankruptcy Courthouse".
Pub. L. 110–263 (text) (PDF)	July 15, 2008	(No short title)	To redesignate Lock and Dam No. 5 of the McClellan-Kerr Arkansas River Navigation System near Redfield, Arkansas, authorized by the Rivers and Harbors Act approved July 24, 1946, as the "Colonel Charles D. Maynard Lock and Dam".
Pub. L. 110–264 (text) (PDF)	July 15, 2008	(No short title)	To designate the station of the United States Border Patrol located at 25762 Madison Avenue in Murrieta, California, as the "Theodore L. Newton, Jr. and George F. Azrak Border Patrol Station".
Pub. L. 110–265 (text) (PDF)	July 15, 2008	(No short title)	To designate the facility of the United States Postal Service located at 1190 Lorena Road in Lorena, Texas, as the "Marine Gunnery Sgt. John D. Fry Post Office Building".
Pub. L. 110–266 (text) (PDF)	July 15, 2008	(No short title)	To designate the Port Angeles Federal Building in Port Angeles, Washington, as the "Richard B. Anderson Federal Building".
Pub. L. 110–267 (text) (PDF)	July 15, 2008	(No short title)	To designate the facility of the United States Postal Service located at 11151 Valley Boulevard in El Monte, California, as the "Marisol Heredia Post Office Building".
Pub. L. 110–268 (text) (PDF)	July 15, 2008	(No short title)	To designate the facility of the United States Postal Service located at 19101 Cortez Boulevard in Brooksville, Florida, as the "Cody Grater Post Office Building".
Pub. L. 110–269 (text) (PDF)	July 15, 2008	(No short title)	To designate the facility of the United States Postal Service located at 11001 Dunklin Drive in St. Louis, Missouri, as the "William 'Bill' Clay Post Office Building".
Pub. L. 110–270 (text) (PDF)	July 15, 2008	(No short title)	To designate the facility of the United States Postal Service located at 117 North Kidd Street in Ionia, Michigan, as the "Alonzo Woodruff Post Office Building".
Pub. L. 110–271 (text) (PDF)	July 15, 2008	(No short title)	To designate the facility of the United States Postal Service located at 7231 FM 1960 in Humble, Texas, as the "Texas Military Veterans Post Office".
Pub. L. 110–272 (text) (PDF)	July 15, 2008	(No short title)	To designate the facility of the United States Postal Service located at 120 Commercial Street in Brockton, Massachusetts, as the "Rocky Marciano Post Office Building".
Pub. L. 110–273 (text) (PDF)	July 15, 2008	District of Columbia Water and Sewer Authority Independence Preservation Act	To preserve the independence of the District of Columbia Water and Sewer Authority.
Pub. L. 110–274 (text) (PDF)	July 15, 2008	(No short title)	To amend the Water Resources Development Act of 2007 to clarify the authority of the Secretary of the Army to provide reimbursement for travel expenses incurred by members of the Committee on Levee Safety.
Pub. L. 110–275 (text) (PDF)	July 15, 2008	Medicare Improvements for Patients and Providers Act of 2008 (NOTE: VETO-OVERRIDDEN)	To amend titles XVIII and XIX of the Social Security Act to extend expiring provisions under the Medicare Program, to improve beneficiary access to preventive and mental health services, to enhance low-income benefit programs, and to maintain access to care in rural areas, including pharmacy access, and for other purposes.
Pub. L. 110–276 (text) (PDF)	July 15, 2008	(No short title)	To designate the United States customhouse building located at 31 Gonzalez Clemente Avenue in Mayaguez, Puerto Rico, as the "Rafael Martinez Nadal United States Customhouse Building".
Pub. L. 110–277 (text) (PDF)	July 17, 2008	American Veterans Disabled for Life Commemorative Coin Act	To require the Secretary of the Treasury to mint coins in commemoration of veterans who became disabled for life while serving in the Armed Forces of the United States.
Pub. L. 110–278 (text) (PDF)	July 17, 2008	Children's Gasoline Burn Prevention Act	To require the Consumer Product Safety Commission to issue regulations mandating child-resistant closures on all portable gasoline containers.
Pub. L. 110–279 (text) (PDF)	July 17, 2008	(No short title)	To provide for certain Federal employee benefits to be continued for certain employees of the Senate Restaurants after operations of the Senate Restaurants are contracted to be performed by a private business concern, and for other purposes.
Pub. L. 110–280 (text) (PDF)	July 21, 2008	Maritime Pollution Prevention Act of 2008	To amend the Act to Prevent Pollution from Ships to implement MARPOL Annex VI.
Pub. L. 110–281 (text) (PDF)	July 21, 2008	National Fish and Wildlife Foundation Establishment Act Amendment of 2008	To amend the National Fish and Wildlife Foundation Establishment Act to increase the number of Directors on the Board of Directors of the National Fish and Wildlife Foundation.
Pub. L. 110–282 (text) (PDF)	July 23, 2008	(No short title)	To designate a portion of United States Route 20A, located in Orchard Park, New York, as the "Timothy J. Russert Highway".
Pub. L. 110–283 (text) (PDF)	July 23, 2008	New and Emerging Technologies 911 Improvement Act of 2008 (or the NET 911 Improvement Act of 2008).	To promote and enhance public safety by facilitating the rapid deployment of IP-enabled 911 and E–911 services, encourage the Nation’s transition to a national IP-enabled emergency network, and improve 911 and E–911 access to those with disabilities.
Pub. L. 110–284 (text) (PDF)	July 23, 2008	(No short title)	To designate the United States courthouse located at 1716 Spielbusch Avenue in Toledo, Ohio, as the "James M. Ashley and Thomas W.L. Ashley United States Courthouse".
Pub. L. 110–285 (text) (PDF)	July 29, 2008	Caroline Pryce Walker Conquer Childhood Cancer Act of 2008	To amend the Public Health Service Act to advance medical research and treatments into pediatric cancers, ensure patients and families have access to information regarding pediatric cancers and current treatments for such cancers, establish a national childhood cancer registry, and promote public awareness of pediatric cancer.
Pub. L. 110–286 (text) (PDF)	July 29, 2008	Tom Lantos Block Burmese JADE (Junta's Anti-Democratic Efforts) Act of 2008	To impose sanctions on officials of the State Peace and Development Council in Burma, to amend the Burmese Freedom and Democracy Act of 2003 to exempt humanitarian assistance from United States sanctions on Burma, to prohibit the importation of gemstones from Burma, or that originate in Burma, to promote a coordinated international effort to restore civilian democratic rule to Burma, and for other purposes.
Pub. L. 110–287 (text) (PDF)	July 29, 2008	(No short title)	Approving the renewal of import restrictions contained in the Burmese Freedom and Democracy Act of 2003
Pub. L. 110–288 (text) (PDF)	July 29, 2008	Clean Boating Act of 2008	To amend the Federal Water Pollution Control Act to address certain discharges incidental to the normal operation of a recreational vessel.
Pub. L. 110–289 (text) (PDF)	July 30, 2008	Housing and Economic Recovery Act of 2008	To provide needed housing reform and for other purposes.
Pub. L. 110–290 (text) (PDF)	July 30, 2008	Regulatory Improvement Act of 2007	To amend title 5, United States Code, to authorize appropriations for the Administrative Conference of the United States through fiscal year 2011, and for other purposes.
Pub. L. 110–291 (text) (PDF)	July 30, 2008	Over-the-Road Bus Transportation Accessibility Act of 2007	To amend title 49, United States Code, to direct the Secretary of Transportation to register a person providing transportation by an over-the-road bus as a motor carrier of passengers only if the person is willing and able to comply with certain accessibility requirements in addition to other existing requirements, and for other purposes.
Pub. L. 110–292 (text) (PDF)	July 30, 2008	(No short title)	To name the Department of Veterans Affairs outpatient clinic in Ponce, Puerto Rico, as the "Euripides Rubio Department of Veterans Affairs Outpatient Clinic".
Pub. L. 110–293 (text) (PDF)	July 30, 2008	Tom Lantos and Henry J. Hyde United States Global Leadership Against HIV/AIDS, Tuberculosis, and Malaria Reauthorization Act of 2008	To authorize appropriations for fiscal years 2009 through 2013 to provide assistance to foreign countries to combat HIV/AIDS, tuberculosis, and malaria, and for other purposes.
Pub. L. 110–294 (text) (PDF)	July 30, 2008	(No short title)	To authorize the Edward Byrne Memorial Justice Assistance Grant Program at fiscal year 2006 levels through 2012.
Pub. L. 110–295 (text) (PDF)	July 30, 2008	DTV Transition Assistance Act	To make a technical correction to section 3009 of the Deficit Reduction Act of 2005.
Pub. L. 110–296 (text) (PDF)	July 30, 2008	Criminal History Background Checks Pilot Extension Act of 2008	To extend the pilot program for volunteer groups to obtain criminal history background checks.
Pub. L. 110–297 (text) (PDF)	July 31, 2008	Soboba Band of Luiseno Indians Settlement Act	To approve, ratify, and confirm the settlement agreement entered into to resolve claims by the Soboba Band of Luiseno Indians relating to alleged interferences with the water resources of the Tribe, to authorize and direct the Secretary of the Interior to execute and perform the Settlement Agreement and related waivers, and for other purposes.
Pub. L. 110–298 (text) (PDF)	July 31, 2008	Law Enforcement Congressional Badge of Bravery Act of 2008	To establish an awards mechanism to honor exceptional acts of bravery in the line of duty by Federal, State, and local law enforcement officers.
Pub. L. 110–299 (text) (PDF)	July 31, 2008	(No short title)	To clarify the circumstances during which the Administrator of the Environmental Protection Agency and applicable States may require permits for discharges from certain vessels, and to require the Administrator to conduct a study of discharges incidental to the normal operation of vessels.
Pub. L. 110–300 (text) (PDF)	July 31, 2008	(No short title)	To temporarily extend the programs under the Higher Education Act of 1965.
Pub. L. 110–301 (text) (PDF)	August 4, 2008	(No short title)	To resolve pending claims against Libya by United States nationals, and for other purposes.
Pub. L. 110–302 (text) (PDF)	August 12, 2008	(No short title)	To designate the Department of Veterans Affairs outpatient clinic in Wenatchee, Washington, as the "Elwood 'Bud' Link Department of Veterans Affairs Outpatient Clinic".
Pub. L. 110–303 (text) (PDF)	August 12, 2008	(No short title)	To designate the facility of the United States Postal Service located at 401 Washington Avenue in Weldon, North Carolina, as the "Dock M. Brown Post Office Building".
Pub. L. 110–304 (text) (PDF)	August 12, 2008	(No short title)	To name the Department of Veterans Affairs medical center in Miami, Florida, as the "Bruce W. Carter Department of Veterans Affairs Medical Center".
Pub. L. 110–305 (text) (PDF)	August 12, 2008	(No short title)	To designate the facility of the United States Postal Service located at 120 South Del Mar Avenue in San Gabriel, California, as the "Chi Mui Post Office Building".
Pub. L. 110–306 (text) (PDF)	August 12, 2008	(No short title)	To designate the facility of the United States Postal Service located at 10449 White Granite Drive in Oakton, Virginia, as the "Private First Class David H. Sharrett II Post Office Building".
Pub. L. 110–307 (text) (PDF)	August 12, 2008	(No short title)	To designate the facility of the United States Postal Service located at 1155 Seminole Trail in Charlottesville, Virginia, as the "Corporal Bradley T. Arms Post Office Building".
Pub. L. 110–308 (text) (PDF)	August 12, 2008	(No short title)	To designate the facility of the United States Postal Service located at 219 East Main Street in West Frankfort, Illinois, as the "Kenneth James Gray Post Office Building".
Pub. L. 110–309 (text) (PDF)	August 12, 2008	(No short title)	To designate the facility of the United States Postal Service located at 42222 Rancho Las Palmas Drive in Rancho Mirage, California, as the "Gerald R. Ford Post Office Building".
Pub. L. 110–310 (text) (PDF)	August 12, 2008	(No short title)	To designate the facility of the United States Postal Service located at 14500 Lorain Avenue in Cleveland, Ohio, as the "John P. Gallagher Post Office Building".
Pub. L. 110–311 (text) (PDF)	August 12, 2008	(No short title)	To designate the Federal building and United States courthouse located at 300 Quarropas Street in White Plains, New York, as the "Charles L. Brieant, Jr., Federal Building and United States Courthouse".
Pub. L. 110–312 (text) (PDF)	August 12, 2008	(No short title)	To provide for the continued performance of the United States Parole Commission.
Pub. L. 110–313 (text) (PDF)	August 12, 2008	(No short title)	To amend title 35, United States Code, and the Trademark Act of 1946 to provide that the Secretary of Commerce, in consultation with the Director of the United States Patent and Trademark Office, shall appoint administrative patent judges and administrative trademark judges, and for other purposes.
Pub. L. 110–314 (text) (PDF)	August 14, 2008	Consumer Product Safety Improvement Act (CSPIA)	To establish consumer product safety standards and other safety requirements for children's products and to reauthorize and modernize the Consumer Product Safety Commission.
Pub. L. 110–315 (text) (PDF)	August 14, 2008	(No short title)	To amend and extend the Higher Education Act of 1965, and for other purposes.
Pub. L. 110–316 (text) (PDF)	August 14, 2008	(No short title)	To amend the Federal Food, Drug, and Cosmetic Act to revise and extend the animal drug user fee program, to establish a program of fees relating to generic new animal drugs, to make certain technical corrections to the Food and Drug Administration Amendments Act of 2007, and for other purposes.
Pub. L. 110–317 (text) (PDF)	August 29, 2008	Hubbard Act	To ensure the fair treatment of a member of the Armed Forces who is discharged from the Armed Forces, at the request of the member, pursuant to the Department of Defense policy permitting the early discharge of a member who is the only surviving child in a family in which the father or mother, or one or more siblings, served in the Armed Forces and, because of hazards incident to such service, was killed, died as a result of wounds, accident, or disease, is in a captured or missing in action status, or is permanently disabled, to amend the Internal Revenue Code of 1986 to repeal the dollar limitation on contributions to funeral trusts, and for other purposes.
Pub. L. 110–318 (text) (PDF)	September 15, 2008	(No short title)	To amend the Internal Revenue Code of 1986 to restore the Highway Trust Fund balance.
Pub. L. 110–319 (text) (PDF)	September 17, 2008	(No short title)	To designate the United States courthouse located at 225 Cadman Plaza East, Brooklyn, New York, as the "Theodore Roosevelt United States Courthouse".
Pub. L. 110–320 (text) (PDF)	September 18, 2008	(No short title)	To designate the United States courthouse located in the 700 block of East Broad Street, Richmond, Virginia, as the "Spottswood W. Robinson III and Robert R. Merhige, Jr., United States Courthouse".
Pub. L. 110–321 (text) (PDF)	September 19, 2008	(No short title)	To provide for extensions of certain authorities of the Department of State, and for other purposes.
Pub. L. 110–322 (text) (PDF)	September 19, 2008	(No short title)	To amend the Federal Rules of Evidence to address the waiver of the attorney-client privilege and the work product doctrine.
Pub. L. 110–323 (text) (PDF)	September 22, 2008	Government Accountability Office Act of 2008	To make certain reforms with respect to the Government Accountability Office, and for other purposes.
Pub. L. 110–324 (text) (PDF)	September 24, 2008	Veterans' Compensation Cost-of-Living Adjustment Act of 2008	To amend title 38, United States Code, to codify increases in the rates of compensation for veterans with service-connected disabilities and the rates of dependency and indemnity compensation for the survivors of certain disabled veterans that were effective as of December 1, 2007, to provide for an increase in the rates of such compensation effective December 1, 2008, and for other purposes.
Pub. L. 110–325 (text) (PDF)	September 25, 2008	ADA Amendments Act of 2008	To restore the intent and protections of the Americans with Disabilities Act of 1990.
Pub. L. 110–326 (text) (PDF)	September 26, 2008	Former Vice President Protection Act of 2008	To amend title 18, United States Code, to provide secret service protection to former Vice Presidents, and for other purposes
Pub. L. 110–327 (text) (PDF)	September 30, 2008	Need-Based Educational Aid Act of 2008	To amend the Improving America's Schools Act of 1994 to make permanent the favorable treatment of need-based educational aid under the antitrust laws.
Pub. L. 110–328 (text) (PDF)	September 30, 2008	SSI Extension for Elderly and Disabled Refugees Act	To amend section 402 of the Personal Responsibility and Work Opportunity Reconciliation Act of 1996 to provide, in fiscal years 2009 through 2011, extensions of supplemental security income for refugees, asylees, and certain other humanitarian immigrants, and to amend the Internal Revenue Code of 1986 to collect unemployment compensation debts resulting from fraud.
Pub. L. 110–329 (text) (PDF)	September 30, 2008	Consolidated Security, Disaster Assistance, and Continuing Appropriations Act, 2009	Making appropriations for the Department of Homeland Security for the fiscal year ending September 30, 2008, and for other purposes.
Pub. L. 110–330 (text) (PDF)	September 30, 2008	Federal Aviation Administration Extension Act of 2008, Part II	To amend title 49, United States Code, to extend authorizations for the airport improvement program, to amend the Internal Revenue Code of 1986 to extend the funding and expenditure authority of the Airport and Airway Trust Fund, and for other purposes.
Pub. L. 110–331 (text) (PDF)	September 30, 2008	(No short title)	To designate the facility of the United States Postal Service located at 301 Commerce Street in Commerce, Oklahoma, as the "Mickey Mantle Post Office Building".
Pub. L. 110–332 (text) (PDF)	September 30, 2008	(No short title)	To designate the Department of Veterans Affairs clinic in Alpena, Michigan, as the "Lieutenant Colonel Clement C. Van Wagoner Department of Veterans Affairs Clinic".
Pub. L. 110–333 (text) (PDF)	September 30, 2008	(No short title)	To designate the facility of the United States Postal Service located at 1717 Orange Avenue in Fort Pierce, Florida, as the "CeeCee Ross Lyles Post Office Building".
Pub. L. 110–334 (text) (PDF)	October 1, 2008	(No short title)	To designate the Federal Bureau of Investigation building under construction in Omaha, Nebraska, as the "J. James Exon Federal Bureau of Investigation Building".
Pub. L. 110–335 (text) (PDF)	October 2, 2008	(No short title)	To amend title 11, District of Columbia Official Code, to implement the increase provided under the District of Columbia Appropriations Act, 2008, in the amount of funds made available for the compensation of attorneys representing indigent defendants in the District of Columbia courts, and for other purposes.
Pub. L. 110–336 (text) (PDF)	October 2, 2008	Library of Congress Sound Recording and Film Preservation Programs Reauthorization Act of 2008	To reauthorize the sound recording and film preservation programs of the Library of Congress, and for other purposes.
Pub. L. 110–337 (text) (PDF)	October 2, 2008	(No short title)	To amend title 49, United States Code, to expand passenger facility fee eligibility for certain noise compatibility projects
Pub. L. 110–338 (text) (PDF)	October 3, 2008	John F. Kennedy Center Reauthorization Act of 2008	To amend the John F. Kennedy Center Act to authorize appropriations for the John F. Kennedy Center for the Performing Arts, and for other purposes.
Pub. L. 110–339 (text) (PDF)	October 3, 2008	Healthy Start Reauthorization Act of 2007	To amend the Public Health Service Act with respect to the Healthy Start Initiative.
Pub. L. 110–340 (text) (PDF)	October 3, 2008	Child Soldiers Accountability Act of 2008	To prohibit the recruitment or use of child soldiers, to designate persons who recruit or use child soldiers as inadmissible aliens, to allow the deportation of persons who recruit or use child soldiers, and for other purposes.
Pub. L. 110–341 (text) (PDF)	October 3, 2008	(No short title)	To amend Public Law 108-331 to provide for the construction and related activities in support of the Very Energetic Radiation Imaging Telescope Array System (VERITAS) project in Arizona.
Pub. L. 110–342 (text) (PDF)	October 3, 2008	(No short title)	Expressing the consent and approval of Congress to an interstate compact regarding water resources in the Great Lakes—St. Lawrence River Basin.
Pub. L. 110–343 (text) (PDF)	October 3, 2008	(No short title); Division A: Emergency Economic Stabilization Act of 2008, Division B: Energy Improvement and Extension Act of 2008, Division C: Tax Extenders and Alternative Minimum Tax Relief Act of 2008, Title V, Subtitle B: Paul Wellstone Mental Health and Addiction Equity Act of 2007; Title VII, Subtitle A: Heartland Disaster Tax Relief Act of 2008	To provide authority for the Federal Government to purchase and insure certain types of troubled assets for the purposes of providing stability to and preventing disruption in the economy and financial system and protecting taxpayers, to amend the Internal Revenue Code of 1986 to provide incentives for energy production and conservation, to extend certain expiring provisions, to provide individual income tax relief, and for other purposes.
Pub. L. 110–344 (text) (PDF)	October 7, 2008	Emmett Till Unsolved Civil Rights Crime Act	To provide for the investigation of certain unsolved civil rights crimes, and for other purposes.
Pub. L. 110–345 (text) (PDF)	October 7, 2008	Drug Endangered Children Act of 2007	To extend the grant program for drug-endangered children.
Pub. L. 110–346 (text) (PDF)	October 7, 2008	North Korean Human Rights Reauthorization Act of 2008	To amend the North Korean Human Rights Act of 2004 to promote respect for the fundamental human rights of the people of North Korea, and for other purposes.
Pub. L. 110–347 (text) (PDF)	October 7, 2008	(No short title)	To designate the facility of the United States Postal Service located at 101 West Main Street in Waterville, New York, as the "Cpl. John P. Sigsbee Post Office".
Pub. L. 110–348 (text) (PDF)	October 7, 2008	(No short title)	To designate the facility of the United States Postal Service located at 101 Tallapoosa Street in Bremen, Georgia, as the "Sergeant Paul Saylor Post Office Building".
Pub. L. 110–349 (text) (PDF)	October 7, 2008	(No short title)	To designate the facility of the United States Postal Service located at 200 North Texas Avenue in Odessa, Texas, as the "Corporal Alfred Mac Wilson Post Office".
Pub. L. 110–350 (text) (PDF)	October 7, 2008	(No short title)	To extend the authority of the Secretary of Education to purchase guaranteed student loans for an additional year, and for other purposes.
Pub. L. 110–351 (text) (PDF)	October 7, 2008	Fostering Connections to Success and Increasing Adoptions Act of 2008	To amend parts B and E of title IV of the Social Security Act to connect and support relative caregivers, improve outcomes for children in foster care, provide for tribal foster care and adoption access, improve incentives for adoption, and for other purposes.
Pub. L. 110–352 (text) (PDF)	October 7, 2008	(No short title)	To designate the facility of the United States Postal Service located at 18 S. G Street, Lakeview, Oregon, as the "Dr. Bernard Daly Post Office Building".
Pub. L. 110–353 (text) (PDF)	October 7, 2008	(No short title)	To designate the facility of the United States Postal Service located at 1700 Cleveland Avenue in Kansas City, Missouri, as the "Reverend Earl Abel Post Office Building".
Pub. L. 110–354 (text) (PDF)	October 8, 2008	Breast Cancer and Environmental Research Act of 2008	To amend the Public Health Service Act to authorize the Director of the National Institute of Environmental Health Sciences to make grants for the development and operation of research centers regarding environmental factors that may be related to the etiology of breast cancer.
Pub. L. 110–355 (text) (PDF)	October 8, 2008	Health Care Safety Net Act of 2008	To amend the Public Health Service Act to provide additional authorizations of appropriations for the health centers program under section 330 of such Act, and for other purposes.
Pub. L. 110–356 (text) (PDF)	October 8, 2008	Federal Protective Service Guard Contracting Reform Act of 2008	To prohibit the award of contracts to provide guard services under the contract security guard program of the Federal Protective Service to a business concern that is owned, controlled, or operated by an individual who has been convicted of a felony.
Pub. L. 110–357 (text) (PDF)	October 8, 2008	National Infantry Museum and Soldier Center Commemorative Coin Act	To require the Secretary of the Treasury to mint coins in commemoration of the legacy of the United States Army Infantry and the establishment of the National Infantry Museum and Soldier Center.
Pub. L. 110–358 (text) (PDF)	October 8, 2008	Effective Child Pornography Prosecution Act of 2007	To amend title 18, United States Code, to provide for more effective prosecution of cases involving child pornography, and for other purposes
Pub. L. 110–359 (text) (PDF)	October 8, 2008	Old Post Office Building Redevelopment Act of 2008	To authorize the Administrator of General Services to provide for the redevelopment of the Old Post Office Building located in the District of Columbia.
Pub. L. 110–360 (text) (PDF)	October 8, 2008	Debbie Smith Reauthorization Act of 2008	To reauthorize the Debbie Smith DNA Backlog Grant Program, and for other purposes.
Pub. L. 110–361 (text) (PDF)	October 8, 2008	Paul D. Wellstone Muscular Dystrophy Community Assistance, Research, and Education Amendments of 2008	To amend the Public Health Service Act to provide for research with respect to various forms of muscular dystrophy, including Becker, congenital, distal, Duchenne, Emery-Dreifuss facioscapulohumeral, limb-girdle, myotonic, and oculopharyngeal, muscular dystrophies.
Pub. L. 110–362 (text) (PDF)	October 8, 2008	(No short title)	To extend for 5 years the program relating to waiver of the foreign country residence requirement with respect to international medical graduates, and for other purposes
Pub. L. 110–363 (text) (PDF)	October 8, 2008	Boy Scouts of America Centennial Commemorative Coin Act	To require the Secretary of the Treasury to mint coins in commemoration of the centennial of the Boy Scouts of America, and for other purposes.
Pub. L. 110–364 (text) (PDF)	October 8, 2008	Oregon Surplus Federal Land Act of 2008	To transfer excess Federal property administered by the Coast Guard to the Confederated Tribes of the Coos, Lower Umpqua, and Siuslaw Indians.
Pub. L. 110–365 (text) (PDF)	October 8, 2008	Great Lakes Legacy Reauthorization Act of 2008	To amend the Federal Water Pollution Control Act to provide for the remediation of sediment contamination in areas of concern, and for other purposes.
Pub. L. 110–366 (text) (PDF)	October 8, 2008	(No short title)	To extend the waiver authority for the Secretary of Education under section 105 of subtitle A of title IV of division B of Public Law 109–148, relating to elementary and secondary education hurricane recovery relief, and for other purposes.
Pub. L. 110–367 (text) (PDF)	October 8, 2008	Defense Production Act Extension and Reauthorization of 2008	To extend and reauthorize the Defense Production Act of 1950, and for other purposes.
Pub. L. 110–368 (text) (PDF)	October 8, 2008	(No short title)	To make a technical correction in the NET 911 Improvement Act of 2008.
Pub. L. 110–369 (text) (PDF)	October 8, 2008	United States-India Nuclear Cooperation Approval and Non-proliferation Enhancement Act	To approve the United States-India Agreement for Cooperation on Peaceful Uses of Nuclear Energy, and for other purposes.
Pub. L. 110–370 (text) (PDF)	October 8, 2008	Native American Heritage Day Act of 2008	To honor the achievements and contributions of Native Americans to the United States, and for other purposes.
Pub. L. 110–371 (text) (PDF)	October 8, 2008	Appalachian Regional Development Act Amendments of 2008	To reauthorize and improve the program authorized by the Apalachian [sic] Regional Development Act of 1965
Pub. L. 110–372 (text) (PDF)	October 8, 2008	Senior Professional Performance Act of 2008	To modify pay provisions relating to certain senior-level positions in the Federal Government, and for other purposes.
Pub. L. 110–373 (text) (PDF)	October 8, 2008	ALS Registry Act	To amend the Public Health Service Act to provide for the establishment of an Amyotrophic Lateral Sclerosis Registry.
Pub. L. 110–374 (text) (PDF)	October 8, 2008	Prenatally and Postnatally Diagnosed Conditions Awareness Act	To amend the Public Health Service Act to increase the provision of scientifically sound information and support services to patients receiving a positive test diagnosis for Down syndrome or other prenatally and postnatally diagnosed conditions.
Pub. L. 110–375 (text) (PDF)	October 8, 2008	(No short title)	To repeal the provision of title 46, United States Code, requiring a license for employment in the business of salvaging on the coast of Florida.
Pub. L. 110–376 (text) (PDF)	October 8, 2008	United States Fire Administration Reauthorization Act of 2008	To reauthorize the United States Fire Administration, and for other purposes.
Pub. L. 110–377 (text) (PDF)	October 8, 2008	Poison Center Support, Enhancement, and Awareness Act of 2008	To amend the Public Health Service Act to reauthorize the poison center national toll-free number, national media campaign, and grant program to provide assistance for poison prevention, sustain the funding of poison centers, and enhance the public health of people of the United States.
Pub. L. 110–378 (text) (PDF)	October 8, 2008	Reconnecting Homeless Youth Act of 2008	To amend the Runaway and Homeless Youth Act to authorize appropriations, and for other purposes.
Pub. L. 110–379 (text) (PDF)	October 8, 2008	QI Program Supplemental Funding Act of 2008	To amend title XIX of the Social Security Act to provide additional funds for the qualifying individual (QI) program, and for other purposes.
Pub. L. 110–380 (text) (PDF)	October 8, 2008	(No short title)	To provide that funds allocated for community food projects for fiscal year 2008 shall remain available until September 30, 2009
Pub. L. 110–381 (text) (PDF)	October 9, 2008	Michelle's Law	To amend the Employee Retirement Income Security Act of 1974, the Public Health Service Act, and the Internal Revenue Code of 1986 to ensure that dependent students who take a medically necessary leave of absence do not lose health insurance coverage, and for other purposes.
Pub. L. 110–382 (text) (PDF)	October 9, 2008	Military Personnel Citizenship Processing Act	To establish a liaison with the Federal Bureau of Investigation in United States Citizenship and Immigration Services to expedite naturalization applications filed by members of the Armed Forces and to establish a deadline for processing such applications.
Pub. L. 110–383 (text) (PDF)	October 10, 2008	Pechanga Band of Luiseno Mission Indians Land Transfer Act of 2007	To transfer certain land in Riverside County, California, and San Diego County, California, from the Bureau of Land Management to the United States to be held in trust for the Pechanga Band of Luiseno Mission Indians, and for other purposes.
Pub. L. 110–384 (text) (PDF)	October 10, 2008	Let Our Veterans Rest in Peace Act of 2008	To direct the United States Sentencing Commission to assure appropriate punishment enhancements for those involved in receiving stolen property where that property consists of grave markers of veterans, and for other purposes.
Pub. L. 110–385 (text) (PDF)	October 10, 2008	Broadband Data Improvement Act	To improve the quality of Federal and State data regarding the availability and quality of broadband services and to promote the deployment of affordable broadband services to all parts of the Nation.
Pub. L. 110–386 (text) (PDF)	October 10, 2008	Hydrographic Services Improvement Act Amendments of 2008	To reauthorize and amend the Hydrographic Services Improvement Act, and for other purposes.
Pub. L. 110–387 (text) (PDF)	October 10, 2008	Veterans' Mental Health and Other Care Improvements Act of 2008	To improve the treatment and services provided by the Department of Veterans Affairs to veterans with post-traumatic stress disorder and substance use disorders, and for other purposes.
Pub. L. 110–388 (text) (PDF)	October 10, 2008	(No short title)	To provide for the appointment of the Chief Human Capital Officer of the Department of Homeland Security by the Secretary of Homeland Security.
Pub. L. 110–389 (text) (PDF)	October 10, 2008	Veterans' Benefits Improvement Act of 2008	To amend title 38, United States Code, to improve and enhance compensation and pension, housing, labor and education, and insurance benefits for veterans, and for other purposes.
Pub. L. 110–390 (text) (PDF)	October 10, 2008	White Mountain Apache Tribe Rural Water System Loan Authorization Act	To direct the Secretary of the Interior to provide a loan to the White Mountain Apache Tribe for use in planning, engineering, and designing a certain water system project.
Pub. L. 110–391 (text) (PDF)	October 10, 2008	Special Immigrant Nonminister Religious Worker Program Act	To extend the special immigrant nonminister religious worker program and for other purposes.
Pub. L. 110–392 (text) (PDF)	October 13, 2008	Comprehensive Tuberculosis Elimination Act of 2008	To amend the Public Health Service Act with respect to making progress toward the goal of eliminating tuberculosis, and for other purposes.
Pub. L. 110–393 (text) (PDF)	October 13, 2008	(No short title)	To authorize the Secretary of Commerce to sell or exchange certain National Oceanic and Atmospheric Administration property located in Norfolk, Virginia, and for other purposes.
Pub. L. 110–394 (text) (PDF)	October 13, 2008	National Sea Grant College Program Amendments Act of 2008	To reauthorize and amend the National Sea Grant College Program Act, and for other purposes.
Pub. L. 110–395 (text) (PDF)	October 13, 2008	(No short title)	To designate the facility of the United States Postal Service located at 245 North Main Street in New City, New York, as the "Kenneth Peter Zebrowski Post Office Building".
Pub. L. 110–396 (text) (PDF)	October 13, 2008	(No short title)	To designate the facility of the United States Postal Service located at 2523 7th Avenue East in North Saint Paul, Minnesota, as the "Mayor William 'Bill' Sandberg Post Office Building".
Pub. L. 110–397 (text) (PDF)	October 13, 2008	(No short title)	To designate the facility of the United States Postal Service located at 4233 West Hillsboro Boulevard in Coconut Creek, Florida, as the "Army SPC Daniel Agami Post Office Building".
Pub. L. 110–398 (text) (PDF)	October 13, 2008	(No short title)	To amend the commodity provisions of the Food, Conservation, and Energy Act of 2008 to permit producers to aggregate base acres and reconstitute farms to avoid the prohibition on receiving direct payments, counter-cyclical payments, or average crop revenue election payments when the sum of the base acres of a farm is 10 acres or less, and for other purposes.
Pub. L. 110–399 (text) (PDF)	October 13, 2008	(No short title)	To designate the facility of the United States Postal Service located at 156 Taunton Avenue in Seekonk, Massachusetts, as the "Lance Corporal Eric Paul Valdepenas Post Office Building".
Pub. L. 110–400 (text) (PDF)	October 13, 2008	Keeping the Internet Devoid of Sexual Predators Act of 2008 (or KIDS Act of 2008)	To require convicted sex offenders to register online identifiers, and for other purposes.
Pub. L. 110–401 (text) (PDF)	October 13, 2008	Providing Resources, Officers, and Technology To Eradicate Cyber Threats to Our Children Act of 2008 (or PROTECT Our Children Act of 2008)	To require the Department of Justice to develop and implement a National Strategy Child Exploitation Prevention and Interdiction, to improve the Internet Crimes Against Children Task Force, to increase resources for regional computer forensic labs, and to make other improvements to increase the ability of law enforcement agencies to investigate and prosecute child predators.
Pub. L. 110–402 (text) (PDF)	October 13, 2008	(No short title)	To extend the authority of the United States Supreme Court Police to protect court officials off the Supreme Court Grounds and change the title of the Administrative Assistant to the Chief Justice.
Pub. L. 110–403 (text) (PDF)	October 13, 2008	Prioritizing Resources and Organization for Intellectual Property Act of 2008 (or PRO-IP Act)	To enhance remedies for violations of intellectual property laws, and for other purposes.
Pub. L. 110–404 (text) (PDF)	October 13, 2008	Presidential Historical Records Preservation Act of 2008	To amend title 44, United States Code, to authorize grants for Presidential Centers of Historical Excellence.
Pub. L. 110–405 (text) (PDF)	October 13, 2008	Air Carriage of International Mail Act	To amend section 5402 of title 39, United States Code, to modify the authority relating to United States Postal Service air transportation contracts, and for other purposes.
Pub. L. 110–406 (text) (PDF)	October 13, 2008	Judicial Administration and Technical Amendments Act of 2008	To make improvements in the operation and administration of the Federal courts, and for other purposes.
Pub. L. 110–407 (text) (PDF)	October 13, 2008	Drug Trafficking Vessel Interdiction Act of 2008	To amend titles 46 and 18, United States Code, with respect to the operation of submersible vessels and semi-submersible vessels without nationality.
Pub. L. 110–408 (text) (PDF)	October 13, 2008	Criminal History Background Checks Pilot Extension Act of 2008	To extend the pilot program for volunteer groups to obtain criminal history background checks.
Pub. L. 110–409 (text) (PDF)	October 14, 2008	Inspector General Reform Act of 2008	To amend the Inspector General Act of 1978 to enhance the independence of the Inspectors General, to create a Council of the Inspectors General on Integrity and Efficiency, and for other purposes.
Pub. L. 110–410 (text) (PDF)	October 14, 2008	(No short title)	To designate the Department of Veterans Affairs Outpatient Clinic in Hermitage, Pennsylvania, as the "Michael A. Marzano Department of Veterans Affairs Outpatient Clinic".
Pub. L. 110–411 (text) (PDF)	October 14, 2008	Native American Housing Assistance and Self-Determination Reauthorization Act of 2008	To reauthorize the Native American Housing Assistance and Self-Determination Act of 1996, and for other purposes.
Pub. L. 110–412 (text) (PDF)	October 14, 2008	Personnel Reimbursement for Intelligence Cooperation and Enhancement of Homeland Security Act of 2008 (or PRICE of Homeland Security Act)	To amend the Homeland Security Act of 2002 to improve the financial assistance provided to State, local, and tribal governments for information sharing activities, and for other purposes.
Pub. L. 110–413 (text) (PDF)	October 14, 2008	Stephanie Tubbs Jones Gift of Life Medal Act of 2008	To establish the Stephanie Tubbs Jones Gift of Life Medal for organ donors and the family of organ donors.
Pub. L. 110–414 (text) (PDF)	October 14, 2008	Mercury Export Ban Act	To prohibit the sale, distribution, transfer, and export of elemental mercury, and for other purposes.
Pub. L. 110–415 (text) (PDF)	October 14, 2008	Methamphetamine Production Prevention Act of 2008	To facilitate the creation of methamphetamine precursor electronic logbook systems, and for other purposes.
Pub. L. 110–416 (text) (PDF)	October 14, 2008	Mentally Ill Offender Treatment and Crime Reduction Reauthorization and Improvement Act of 2008	To amend title I of the Omnibus Crime Control and Safe Streets Act of 1968 to provide grants for the improved mental health treatment and services provided to offenders with mental illnesses, and for other purposes.
Pub. L. 110–417 (text) (PDF)	October 14, 2008	Duncan Hunter National Defense Authorization Act for Fiscal Year 2009	To authorize appropriations for fiscal year 2009 for military activities of the Department of Defense, for military construction, and for defense activities of the Department of Energy, to prescribe military personnel strengths for such fiscal year, to amend the Servicemembers Civil Relief Act to provide for the protection of child custody arrangements for parents who are members of the Armed Forces deployed in support of a contingency operation, and for other purposes.
Pub. L. 110–418 (text) (PDF)	October 14, 2008	(No short title)	To designate a portion of the Rappahannock River in the Commonwealth of Virginia as the "John W. Warner Rapids".
Pub. L. 110–419 (text) (PDF)	October 15, 2008	(No short title)	To clarify the boundaries of Coastal Barrier Resources System Clam Pass Unit FL-64P.
Pub. L. 110–420 (text) (PDF)	October 15, 2008	Code Talkers Recognition Act of 2008	To require the issuance of medals to recognize the dedication and valor of Native American code talkers.
Pub. L. 110–421 (text) (PDF)	October 15, 2008	Bulletproof Vest Partnership Grant Act of 2008	To amend title I of the Omnibus Crime Control and Safe Streets Act of 1968 to extend the authorization of the Bulletproof Vest Partnership Grant Program through fiscal year 2012.
Pub. L. 110–422 (text) (PDF)	October 15, 2008	NASA Authorization Act of 2008	To authorize the programs of the National Aeronautics and Space Administration, and for other purposes.
Pub. L. 110–423 (text) (PDF)	October 15, 2008	(No short title)	To provide that Federal employees receiving their pay by electronic funds transfer shall be given the option of receiving their pay stubs electronically.
Pub. L. 110–424 (text) (PDF)	October 15, 2008	(No short title)	To authorize funding to conduct a national training program for State and local prosecutors.
Pub. L. 110–425 (text) (PDF)	October 15, 2008	Ryan Haight Online Pharmacy Consumer Protection Act of 2008	To amend the Controlled Substances Act to address online pharmacies.
Pub. L. 110–426 (text) (PDF)	October 15, 2008	Stephanie Tubbs Jones Organ Transplant Authorization Act of 2008	To amend the Public Health Service Act to authorize increased Federal funding for the Organ Procurement and Transplantation Network.
Pub. L. 110–427 (text) (PDF)	October 15, 2008	(No short title)	To authorize the Administrator of General Services to take certain actions with respect to parcels of real property located in Eastlake, Ohio, and Koochiching County, Minnesota, and for other purposes.
Pub. L. 110–428 (text) (PDF)	October 15, 2008	Inmate Tax Fraud Prevention Act of 2008	To amend the Internal Revenue Code of 1986 to permit the Secretary of the Treasury to disclose certain prisoner return information to the Federal Bureau of Prisons, and for other purposes.
Pub. L. 110–429 (text) (PDF)	October 15, 2008	Naval Vessel Transfer Act of 2008	To authorize the transfer of naval vessels to certain foreign recipients, and for other purposes.
Pub. L. 110–430 (text) (PDF)	October 15, 2008	(No short title)	Appointing the day for the convening of the first session of the One Hundred Eleventh Congress.
Pub. L. 110–431 (text) (PDF)	October 15, 2008	(No short title)	To authorize funding for the National Crime Victim Law Institute to provide support for victims of crime under Crime Victims Legal Assistance Programs as a part of the Victims of Crime Act of 1984.
Pub. L. 110–432 (text) (PDF)	October 16, 2008	Passenger Rail Investment and Improvement Act of 2008 (PRIIA), Including the Rail Safety Improvement Act of 2008 (Division 1 of the Act) and the Clean Railroads Act of 2008 (Title VI of the Act)	To reauthorize Amtrak, and for other purposes.
Pub. L. 110–433 (text) (PDF)	October 16, 2008	(No short title)	To extend through 2013 the authority of the Federal Election Commission to impose civil money penalties on the basis of a schedule of penalties established and published by the Commission.
Pub. L. 110–434 (text) (PDF)	October 16, 2008	Vessel Hull Design Protection Amendments of 2008	To amend chapter 13 of title 17, United States Code (relating to the vessel hull design protection), to clarify the definitions of a hull and a deck.
Pub. L. 110–435 (text) (PDF)	October 16, 2008	Webcaster Settlement Act of 2008	To amend section 114 of title 17, United States Code, to provide for agreements for the reproduction and performance of sound recordings by webcasters.
Pub. L. 110–436 (text) (PDF)	October 16, 2008	(No short title)	To extend the Andean Trade Preference Act, and for other purposes.
Pub. L. 110–437 (text) (PDF)	October 20, 2008	Capitol Visitor Center Act of 2008	To establish the Office of the Capitol Visitor Center within the Office of the Architect of the Capitol, headed by the Chief Executive Officer for Visitor Services, to provide for the effective management and administration of the Capitol Visitor Center, and for other purposes.
Pub. L. 110–438 (text) (PDF)	October 20, 2008	National Guard and Reservists Debt Relief Act of 2008	To amend title 11, United States Code, to exempt for a limited period, from the application of the means-test presumption of abuse under chapter 7, qualifying members of reserve components of the Armed Forces and members of the National Guard who, after September 11, 2001, are called to active duty or to perform a homeland defense activity for not less than 90 days.
Pub. L. 110–439 (text) (PDF)	October 21, 2008	(No short title)	To designate the facility of the United States Postal Service located at 2150 East Hardtner Drive in Urania, Louisiana, as the "Murphy A. Tannehill Post Office Building".
Pub. L. 110–440 (text) (PDF)	October 21, 2008	(No short title)	To designate the facility of the United States Postal Service located at 100 West Percy Street in Indianola, Mississippi, as the "Minnie Cox Post Office Building".
Pub. L. 110–441 (text) (PDF)	October 21, 2008	(No short title)	To designate a portion of California State Route 91 located in Los Angeles County, California, as the "Juanita Millender-McDonald Highway".
Pub. L. 110–442 (text) (PDF)	October 21, 2008	(No short title)	To designate the facility of the United States Postal Service located at 1750 Lundy Avenue in San Jose, California, as the "Gordon N. Chan Post Office Building".
Pub. L. 110–443 (text) (PDF)	October 21, 2008	(No short title)	To designate the facility of the United States Postal Service located at 300 Vine Street in New Lenox, Illinois, as the "Jacob M. Lowell Post Office Building".
Pub. L. 110–444 (text) (PDF)	October 21, 2008	(No short title)	To designate the facility of the United States Postal Service located at 4 South Main Street in Wallingford, Connecticut, as the "CWO Richard R. Lee Post Office Building".
Pub. L. 110–445 (text) (PDF)	October 21, 2008	(No short title)	To designate the facility of the United States Postal Service located at 801 Industrial Boulevard in Ellijay, Georgia, as the "First Lieutenant Noah Harris Ellijay Post Office Building".
Pub. L. 110–446 (text) (PDF)	October 21, 2008	(No short title)	To designate the facility of the United States Postal Service located at 513 6th Avenue in Dayton, Kentucky, as the "Staff Sergeant Nicholas Ray Carnes Post Office".
Pub. L. 110–447 (text) (PDF)	October 21, 2008	(No short title)	To designate the facility of the United States Postal Service located at 210 South Ellsworth Avenue in San Mateo, California, as the "Leo J. Ryan Post Office Building".
Pub. L. 110–448 (text) (PDF)	October 22, 2008	(No short title)	To designate the facility of the United States Postal Service located at 7095 Highway 57 in Counce, Tennessee, as the "Pickwick Post Office Building".
Pub. L. 110–449 (text) (PDF)	November 21, 2008	Unemployment Compensation Extension Act of 2008	To provide for additional emergency unemployment compensation.
Pub. L. 110–450 (text) (PDF)	December 1, 2008	United States Army Commemorative Coin Act of 2008	To require the Secretary of the Treasury to mint coins in recognition and celebration of the establishment of the United States Army in 1775, to honor the American soldier of both today and yesterday, in wartime and in peace, and to commemorate the traditions, history, and heritage of the United States Army and its role in American society, from the Colonial period to today.
Pub. L. 110–451 (text) (PDF)	December 2, 2008	Civil Rights Act of 1964 Commemorative Coin Act	To require the Secretary of the Treasury to mint coins in commemoration of the semicentennial of the enactment of the Civil Rights Act of 1964.
Pub. L. 110–452 (text) (PDF)	December 2, 2008	Child Safe Viewing Act of 2007	To develop the next generation of parental control technology.
Pub. L. 110–453 (text) (PDF)	December 2, 2008	Albuquerque Indian School Act	To direct the Secretary of the Interior to take into trust 2 parcels of Federal land for the benefit of certain Indian Pueblos in the State of New Mexico, and for other purposes.
Pub. L. 110–454 (text) (PDF)	December 19, 2008	(No short title)	To designate the facility of the United States Postal Service located at 1501 South Slappey Boulevard in Albany, Georgia, as the "Dr. Walter Carl Gordon, Jr. Post Office Building".
Pub. L. 110–455 (text) (PDF)	December 19, 2008	(No short title)	Ensuring that the compensation and other emoluments attached to the office of Secretary of State are those which were in effect on January 1, 2007.
Pub. L. 110–456 (text) (PDF)	December 23, 2008	America's Beautiful National Parks Quarter Dollar Coin Act of 2008	To provide for a program for circulating quarter dollar coins that are emblematic of a national park or other national site in each State, the District of Columbia, and each territory of the United States, and for other purposes.
Pub. L. 110–457 (text) (PDF)	December 23, 2008	William Wilberforce Trafficking Victims Protection Reauthorization Act of 2008	To authorize appropriations for fiscal years 2008 through 2011 for the Trafficking Victims Protection Act of 2000, to enhance measures to combat trafficking in persons, and for other purposes.
Pub. L. 110–458 (text) (PDF)	December 23, 2008	Worker, Retiree, and Employer Recovery Act of 2008	To make technical corrections related to the Pension Protection Act of 2006, and for other purposes.
Pub. L. 110–459 (text) (PDF)	December 23, 2008	Short-term Analog Flash and Emergency Readiness Act (SAFER Act)	To require the Federal Communications Commission to provide for a short-term extension of the analog television broadcasting authority so that essential public safety announcements and digital television transition information may be provided for a short time during the transition to digital television broadcasting.
Pub. L. 110–460 (text) (PDF)	December 23, 2008	(No short title)	To make a technical correction in the Paul Wellstone and Pete Domenici Mental Health Parity and Addiction Equity Act of 2008.

== Private laws ==
No private laws have been enacted during this Congress.

== Treaties ratified ==
The following treaties have been ratified in the 110th Congress:

Treaty document number	Date of ratification	Short title
Treaty 110-2	December 2, 2007	Singapore Treaty on the Law of Trademarks
Treaty 110-3	December 14, 2007	Tax Convention with Belgium
Treaty 110-9	July 21, 2008	Protocol of Amendments to Convention on International Hydrographic Organization
Treaty 110-14	July 21, 2008	International Convention Against Doping in Sport
Treaty 110-11	September 23, 2008	Extradition Treaty with Romania and Protocol to the Treaty on Mutual Legal Assistance in Criminal Matters with Romania
Treaty 110-12	September 23, 2008	Extradition Treaty with Bulgaria and an Agreement on Certain Aspects of Mutual Legal Assistance in Criminal Matters with Bulgaria
Treaty 110-15	September 23, 2008	Protocol Amending 1980 Tax Convention with Canada
Treaty 110-17	September 23, 2008	Tax Convention with Iceland
Treaty 110-18	September 23, 2008	Tax Convention with Bulgaria with Proposed Protocol of Amendment
Treaty 110-1	September 25, 2008	Land-Based Sources Protocol to Cartagena Convention
Treaty 110-4	September 25, 2008	International Convention for the Suppression of Acts of Nuclear Terrorism
Treaty 110-6	September 25, 2008	Amendment to Convention on Physical Protection of Nuclear Material
Treaty 110-8	September 25, 2008	Protocols of 2005 to the Convention concerning Safety of Maritime Navigation and to the Protocol concerning Safety of Fixed Platforms on the Continental Shelf
Treaty 110-16	September 25, 2008	Amendments to the Constitution and Convention of the International Telecommunication Union (Geneva, 1992)
Treaty 110-20	September 25, 2008	Protocols to the North Atlantic Treaty of 1949 on Accession of Albania and Croatia
Treaty 110-13	September 26, 2008	International Convention on Control of Harmful Anti-Fouling Systems on Ships, 2001

== See also ==
- List of United States federal legislation
- List of acts of the 109th United States Congress
- List of acts of the 111th United States Congress
