= Michelle Morse =

Michelle Morse (1982–2005) was an advocate for student health rights. A new federal law passed in 2008 is named for her to acknowledge her efforts to ensure that college students did not lose their access to health insurance when taking a leave of absence for a serious illness.

Ms. Morse was a student at Plymouth State University in New Hampshire when she was diagnosed with cancer on December 12, 2003. Her physician stated that she needed to quit school to undergo therapy. However, Ms. Morse found that the leave of absence would nullify her insurance. Instead, Ms. Morse chose to continue her studies while undergoing therapy. She maintained better than a 3.0 grade point average, taught classes, and took on the state and national legislatures to enact laws that would protect student health benefits. She graduated cum laude in May 2005. She died November 10, 2005.

Michelle's Law (H.R. 2851), as it is now known, passed vote in the House July 30, 2008, and Senate September 25, 2008. The bill was signed into law by President Bush October 9, 2008.

== Sources ==
- "Michelle Morse, Inspiration for 'Michelle’s Law,' Loses Her Battle with Cancer at Age 22". Michelleslaw.com, November 12, 2005.
- "An angel on my shoulder": Mother balances grief with legal reality. Noah Farr, The New Hampshire, November 18, 2005.
- "Senate Approves Bill That Would Allow College Students to Keep Their Health Coverage in the Event of Medical Leave". American Cancer Society Cancer Action Network, Sept. 25, 2008.
- "H.R. 2851 Michelle's Law". Govtrack.us, October 9, 2008.
