= Water Resources Development Act of 2007 =

- Long title: An act to provide for the conservation and development of water and related resources, to authorize the Secretary of the Army to construct various projects for improvements to rivers and harbors of the United States, and for other purposes.
- Enacted by: the 110th United States Congress

Citations
- Public law: Pub. L. 110–114 (text) (PDF)
- Statutes at Large: 121 Stat. 1041

Codification
- Titles amended: Title 33

Legislative history
- Introduced in the House as H.R.1495 by Jim Oberstar (D–MN) on March 13, 2007; Passed the House on April 19, 2007 (394-25); Passed the Senate on May 16, 2007 (91-4); Reported by the joint conference committee on July 31, 2007; agreed to by the House on August 1, 2007 (381-40) and by the Senate on 81-12 (September 24, 2007); Vetoed by President George W. Bush on November 2, 2007; Overridden by the House on November 6, 2007 (361-54); Overridden by the Senate and became law on November 8, 2007 (79-14)

The Water Resources Development Act of 2007 or WRDA 2007 (Pub. L. 110–114 (text) (PDF), formerly H.R. 1495) is a United States law that reauthorized the Water Resources Development Act (WRDA), and authorized flood control, navigation, and environmental projects and studies by the United States Army Corps of Engineers. However, the law does not appropriate funds for those projects and programs. It was passed by the 110th United States Congress on November 8, 2007 over President George W. Bush's veto.

== Congressional action ==
=== House ===
On April 19, 2007, the United States House of Representatives considered a bill (H.R.1495), sponsored by Rep. Jim Oberstar (D-Minn.), to authorize the Secretary of the Army to construct various projects for improvements to rivers and harbors of the United States.

Among its many projects, the bill authorized the following:

- Conduct navigation and ecosystem improvements involving the Illinois Waterway system. The effort would span 854 miles from the Ohio River and down the Mississippi River to the St. Anthony Falls lock in Minneapolis, Minn. About 327 miles of the Illinois Waterway would be improved. Mooring facilities would be installed at various locks and new locks would be authorized on the Mississippi and the Illinois Waterway. The overall cost would be $1.8 billion.
- Launch a task force comprising various federal Department Secretaries and State officials called the Coastal Louisiana Ecosystem Protection and Restoration Task Force. It would make recommendations and propose strategies to protect, repair, restore and maintain the ecosystem of the Louisiana coastal zone.
- Direct funds to help restore the Florida Everglades. Specifically, Florida Everglade restoration would move slightly forward with a section of the bill that authorizes three projects related to the restoration. The Indian River Lagoon ecosystem restoration would move forward with $1.4 billion (the Federal cost is estimated at $682.5 million and the non-Federal, state costs around $682.5 million). The related Picayune Strand element of the Florida project is estimated at $187.7 million federal and the same from the State of Florida. The third, site 1 impoundment projects would divide $80 million between the state and federal governments. Credit to reimburse non-federal participants in the restoration project would be granted, but future claims would need to be based on a written agreement that the non-federal entity would do the work. A three-mile section of the famed Tamiami Trail would be raised or replaced with bridges to allow better Everglade's water flow.

The bill passed, 394-25.

=== Senate ===
When the bill was introduced in the United States Senate, it was held up in the Senate Committee on Environment and Public Works because of the development of a substitute bill intended to fix several problems apparent in the original. One such problem was that the earmark disclosure table was printed in tiny type and was reproduced as a single image, making a computerized search impossible. Committee sources said the printing snafu was unintentional, having more to do with the way the Government Printing Office reproduced the legislation than the way the committee intended it to be presented. The Congressional Budget Office estimated that the Senate bill would cost $31.5 billion, more than twice the estimate of the House bill that was estimated at around $13.2 billion. The substitute bill would be introduced to bring the cost down to around the same estimate as the House version, fix the printing problem, and to rearrange some of the earmarks of the original version.

On May 9, the Senate invoked cloture on the $13.2 billion version of the bill (identical to the one passed by the House), 89-7.

The following week, the bill was amended. Specifically, the Senate agreed to spend more, at least $15 billion on Gulf Coast projects that would ensure more protection for New Orleans and the surrounding area from Category 5 hurricanes. Spending for the House version was "$6.7 billion over the 2008-2012 period and an additional $6.5 billion over the 10 years after 2012. The Senate version would spend about $5.5 billion over the 2008-2012 period and an additional $26 billion over the 10 years after 2012."

The Senate version would also limit the number of projects the Army Corps of Engineers would work on, reducing it from 50 to 40.

== Pros and cons ==
=== Support ===
The Water Resources Development Act (WRDA) bill, which authorizes funding for a variety of projects, including beach nourishment, clean water, and flood control programs, passed both chambers of Congress, was vetoed by President Bush, but Democratic Party leaders promised to quickly override this veto. "When we override this irresponsible veto, perhaps the president will finally recognize that Congress is an equal branch of government and reconsider his many other reckless veto threats," said Senate Majority Leader Harry Reid (D-Nev.). Howard Marlowe of Marlowe & Company said, "Water resources are critical to the nation's economy and international competitiveness. To say this is too expensive flies in the face of the fact that the administration has done nothing over the past seven years to build water resources infrastructure." "Without a Water Resources Development Act, which is seven years overdue, we are seeing our coastline disappear," said Rep. Charles Boustany (R-La).

=== Opposition ===
A watchdog group, Taxpayers for Common Sense (TCS) commented that the bill was just a continuation of the political practices that led to the Hurricane Katrina disaster in 2005. It stated, "In the starkest terms, Katrina showed us that the time is long passed to end the political spoils system that has driven water project investment for more than a century. We need a modern, accountable and prioritized system to develop and award projects. It's a message that Congress has failed to grasp." While the bill provided funding for water projects around the country, it also contained "more than 800 parochial pork barrel projects for virtually every Congressional district in the nation." TCS complained that instead of disbursing funds by need, the legislators distributed as much as they could to their own districts.

== Bush veto ==
President Bush vetoed the bill on November 2.

His reasoning is as follows:

This bill lacks fiscal discipline. I fully support funding for water resources projects that will yield high economic and environmental returns to the Nation and each year my budget has proposed reasonable and responsible funding, including $4.9 billion for 2008, to support the Army Corps of Engineers' (Corps) main missions. However, this authorization bill makes promises to local communities that the Congress does not have a track record of keeping. The House of Representatives took a $15 billion bill into negotiations with a $14 billion bill from the Senate and instead of splitting the difference, emerged with a Washington compromise that costs over $23 billion. This is not fiscally responsible, particularly when local communities have been waiting for funding for projects already in the pipeline. The bill's excessive authorization for over 900 projects and programs exacerbates the massive backlog of ongoing Corps construction projects, which will require an additional $38 billion in future appropriations to complete. This bill does not set priorities. The authorization and funding of Federal water resources projects should be focused on those projects with the greatest merit that are also a Federal responsibility. My Administration has repeatedly urged the Congress to authorize only those projects and programs that provide a high return on investment and are within the three main missions of the Corps' civil works program: facilitating commercial navigation, reducing the risk of damage from floods and storms, and restoring aquatic ecosystems. This bill does not achieve that goal. This bill promises hundreds of earmarks and hinders the Corps' ability to fulfill the Nation's critical water resources needs -- including hurricane protection for greater New Orleans, flood damage reduction for Sacramento, and restoration of the Everglades while diverting resources from the significant investments needed to maintain existing Federal water infrastructure. American taxpayers should not be asked to support a pork-barrel system of Federal authorization and funding where a project's merit is an afterthought.

== Veto override ==
The House voted 361 - 54 (290 required) to override President Bush's veto. House members from both parties representing those areas disagreed with Bush's attempt to kill the bill. The next day, the Senate also voted to override the veto 79 - 14 (67 required), making it the first veto override of Bush's term and the first veto override in ten years. The bill only authorizes projects like coastal restoration and river navigation; funding still needed to be secured via the appropriations committees.

== See also ==
- Flood Control Act
- Rivers and Harbors Act
