= Medicare Improvements for Patients and Providers Act of 2008 =

US law

- Long title: An Act to amend Titles XVIII and XIX of the Social Security Act to extend expiring provisions under the Medicare Program, to improve beneficiary access to preventive and mental health services, to enhance low-income benefit programs, and to maintain access to care in rural areas, including pharmacy access, and for other purposes.
- Acronyms (colloquial): MIPPA
- Enacted by: the 110th United States Congress
- Effective: July 15, 2008

Citations
- Public law: 110-275
- Statutes at Large: 122 Stat. 2494

Codification
- Acts amended: Social Security Act

The Medicare Improvements for Patients and Providers Act of 2008 ("MIPPA"), is a 2008 statute of United States Federal legislation which amends the Social Security Act.

On July 15, 2008, President George W. Bush vetoed the bill. On that same day the House of Representatives and the Senate voted to overturn the veto.

This law contained the first revision to policy covering Medicare Part D.
